= Aix-Marseille University =

Public university in Provence, France

- Aix-Marseille Université
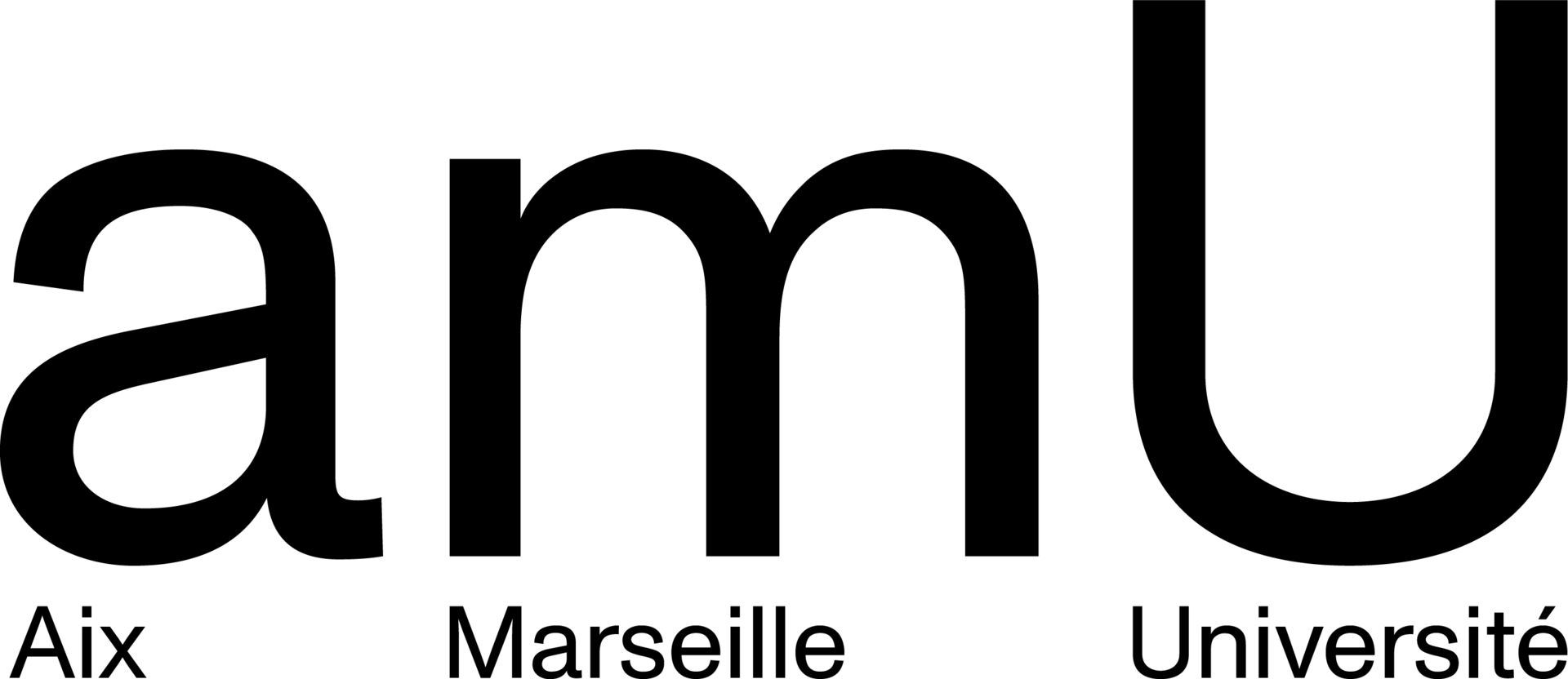
- Type: Public research university
- Established: 1409 – University of Provence; 1896 – University of Aix-Marseille; 1968 – University of Provence Aix-Marseille I 1968 – University of the Mediterranean Aix-Marseille II; 1973 – Paul Cézanne University Aix-Marseille III; 2012 – Aix-Marseille University
- Founder: Louis II of Anjou
- Affiliations: UNIMED; AMBA; EUA; EQUIS; Udice Group; CIVIS; Téthys; FGU
- Budget: €856 million
- President: Eric Berton
- Faculty: 4,273
- Administrative staff: 4,107
- Students: 84,000
- Doctoral students: 2,448
- Location: Aix-en-Provence and Marseille, Bouches-du-Rhône, Provence-Alpes-Côte d'Azur, France; 43°17′36.68″N 5°21′28.5″E
- Website: univ-amu.fr

Aix-Marseille University (AMU; French: Aix-Marseille Université; formally incorporated as Université d'Aix-Marseille) is a public research university located in the Provence region of southern France. It was founded in 1409 when Louis II of Anjou, Count of Provence, petitioned the Pisan Antipope Alexander V to establish the University of Provence, making it one of the oldest universities in the Francophone world. The institution came into its current form in 2012 following the reunification of the University of Provence, the University of the Mediterranean and Paul Cézanne University, resulting in the creation of the largest university in the French-speaking world in terms of its student body, its faculty and staff, and its budget that currently stands at €856 million.

The university is organized around five main campuses situated in Aix-en-Provence and Marseille. Apart from its major campuses, AMU owns and operates facilities in Arles, Aubagne, Avignon, Digne-les-Bains, Gap, La Ciotat, Lambesc and Salon-de-Provence. The university is headquartered in the 7th arrondissement of Marseille.

AMU has produced many notable alumni in the fields of law, politics, business, economics, and the arts. To date, there have been five Nobel Prize laureates amongst its alumni and faculty, as well as a two-time recipient of the Pulitzer Prize, six César Award winners, multiple heads of state or government, parliamentary speakers, government ministers, judges, ambassadors, and members of the constituent academies of the Institut de France.

AMU has hundreds of research and teaching partnerships, including close collaboration with the French National Centre for Scientific Research (CNRS), the French Alternative Energies and Atomic Energy Commission (CEA), and Électricité de France (EDF). AMU is a member of numerous academic organisations including the European University Association (EUA), the Mediterranean Universities Union (UNIMED), and the Udice Group.

== History ==
=== Early history (1409–1800) ===
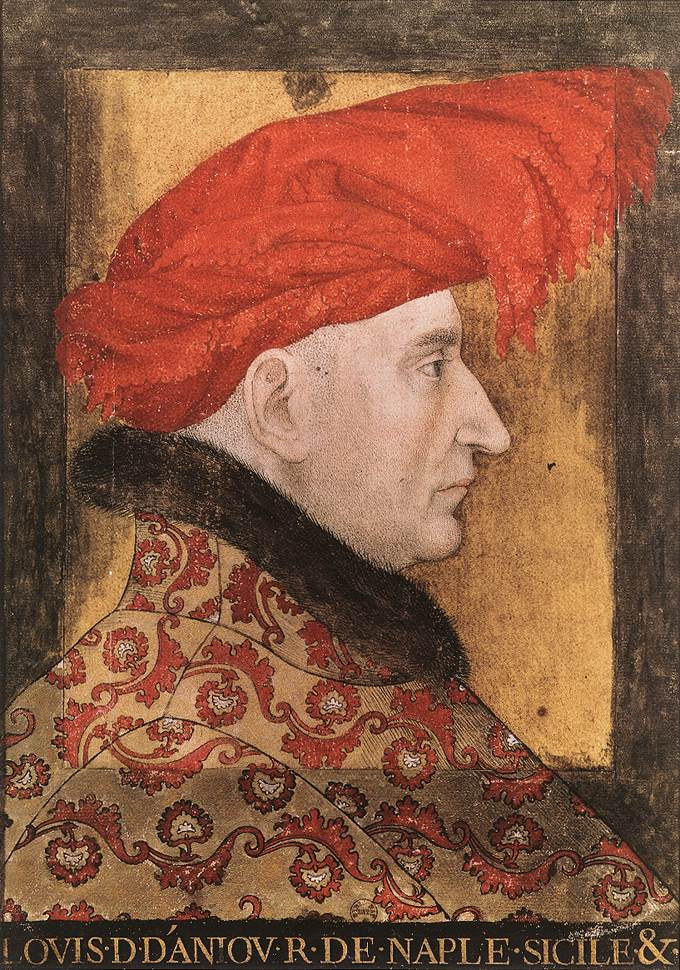
Louis II of Anjou, Count of Provence, the university's founder, as painted by Barthélemy d'Eyck in c. 1456-1465 and now on display at the National Library of France

The institution developed out of the original University of Provence, founded on 9 December 1409 as a studium generale by Louis II of Anjou, Count of Provence, and recognized by papal bull issued by the Pisan Antipope Alexander V. However, there is evidence that teaching in Aix existed in some form from the beginning of the 12th century, since there were a doctor of theology in 1100, a doctor of law in 1200 and a professor of law in 1320 on the books. The decision to establish the university was, in part, a response to the already-thriving University of Paris. As a result, in order to be sure of the viability of the new institution, Louis II compelled his Provençal students to study in Aix only. Thus, the letters patent for the university were granted, and the government of the university was created. The Archbishop of Aix-en-Provence, Thomas de Pupio, was appointed as the first chancellor of the university for the rest of his life. After his death in 1420, a new chancellor was elected by the rector, masters, and licentiates – an uncommon arrangement not repeated at any other French university. The rector was to be an "ordinary student", who had unrestricted civil and criminal jurisdiction in all cases where one party was a doctor or scholar of the university. Those displeased with the rector's decisions could appeal to a doctor legens. Eleven consiliarii provided assistance to the rector, being elected yearly by their predecessors. These individuals represented all faculties, but were elected from among the students. The constitution was of a student-university, and the instructors did not have great authority except in granting degrees. A resident doctor or student who married was required to pay charivari to the university, the amount varying with the degree or status of the man, and being increased if the bride was a widow. Refusal to submit to this statutable extortion was punished by the assemblage of students at the summons of the rector with frying-pans, bassoons, and horns at the house of the newly married couple. Continued recusancy was followed by the piling up of dirt in front of their door upon every Feast-day. These injunctions were justified on the ground that the money extorted was devoted to divine service.

In 1481, the County of Provence came under the dominion of the French rule, marking a significant shift in its political landscape. The university's continued existence was approved by Louis XII, and Aix-en-Provence remained a key provincial hub. It was, for instance, the seat of the Parlement of Aix-en-Provence from 1501 to 1789, no doubt aided by the presence of the law school.

In 1603, Henry IV established the Collège Royal de Bourbon in Aix-en-Provence for the study of belles-lettres and philosophy, supplementing the traditional faculties of the university, but not formally a part of it. This college de plain exercice became a significant seat of learning, under the control of the Jesuits. Throughout the 16th and 17th centuries, the college frequently served as a preparatory, but unaffiliated, school for the university. Only the university was entitled to award degrees in the theology, law, and medicine; but candidates for degrees had first to pass an examination in philosophy, which was only provided by the college. Universities basically accepted candidates who had studied in colleges formally affiliated with them, which in reality required both college and university to be situated in the same city. In 1762 the Jesuits were forced to leave France, and in 1763 the college was officially affiliated with the university as a faculty of arts. The addition of the Collège Royal de Bourbon essentially widened the scope of courses provided at the University of Provence. Formal instruction in French was initially provided at the college, with texts and a structured course of study. Physics later became a part of the curriculum at the college as a part of the philosophy course in the 18th century. In 1741, equipment for conducting experiments was acquired, and the first experimental physics course was offered at Aix-en-Provence. Classical mechanics, however, was only taught after 1755, when the physicist Aimé-Henri Paulian offered his first class and Isaac Newton's Principia and commentaries were obtained for the library.

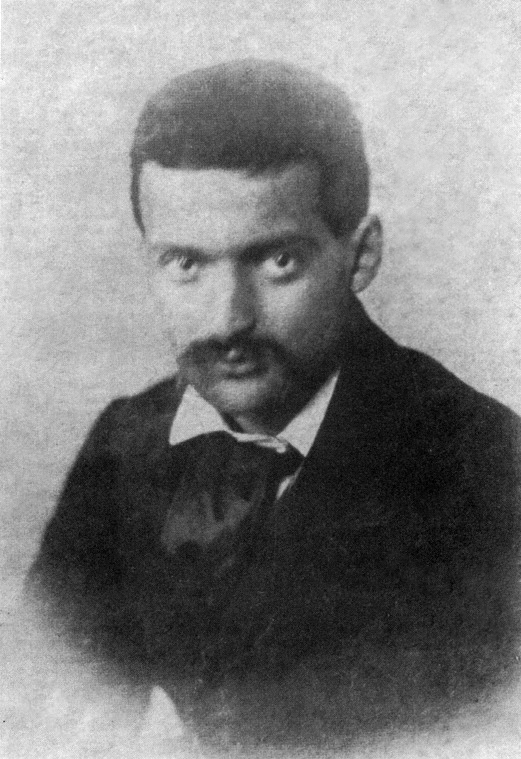
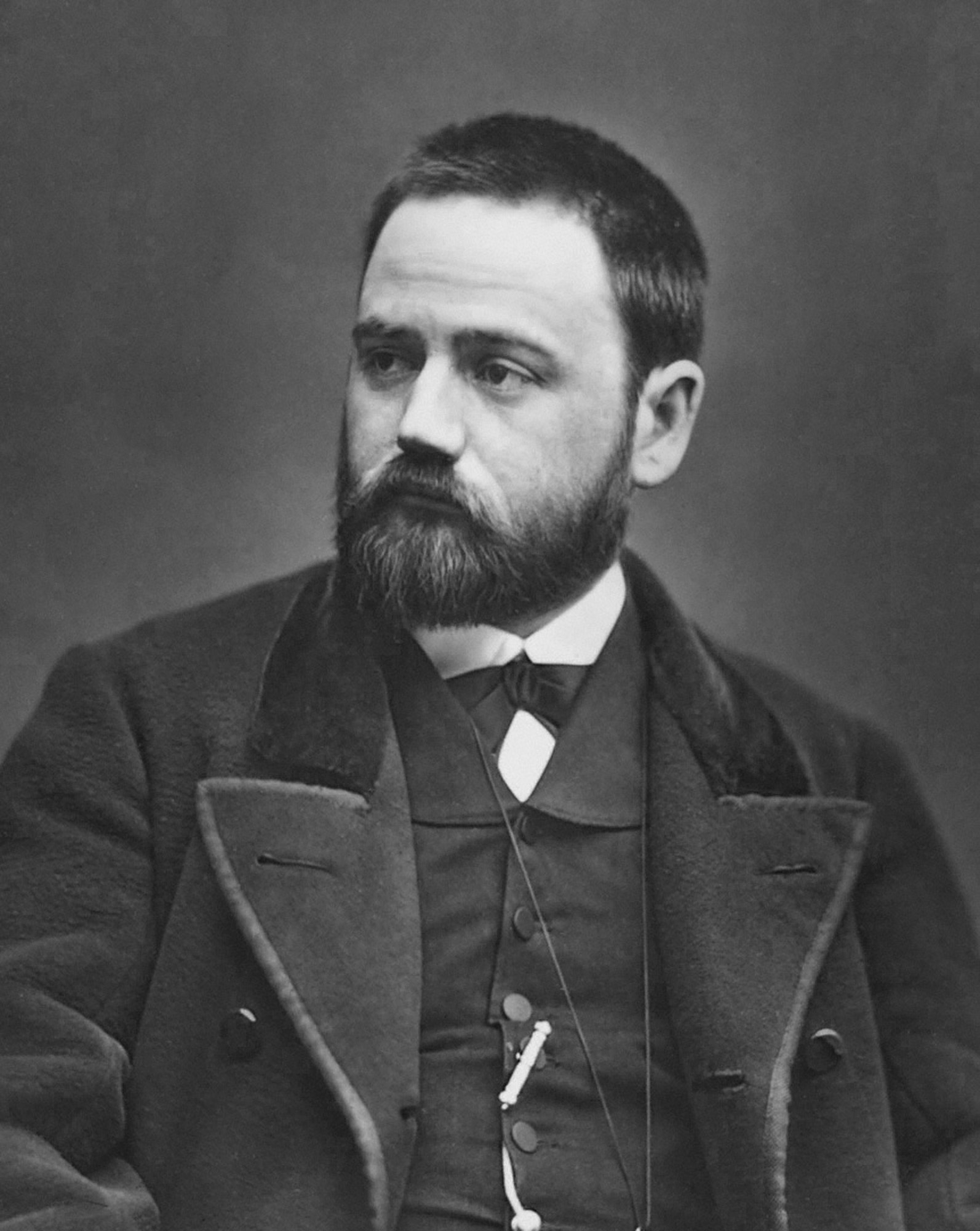
Paul Cézanne and Émile Zola's friendship began in 1852 when they met at the Collège Royal de Bourbon, which used to be part of the university. Subsequently, Cézanne enrolled in the university's law school.

Another point of significance is that decades later, in 1852, Paul Cézanne entered the Collège Royal de Bourbon where he met and befriended Émile Zola. This friendship was decisive for both men so they had successful careers – Cézanne as a painter and Zola as a writer. Among their closest friends at the college was Baptistin Baille, who went on to become a notable scientist and industrialist; together they were famously known as les trois inséparables (the three inseparables).

The French Revolution, with its focus on the individual and an end to inherited privilege, saw the suppression of the universities. To the revolutionaries, universities embodied bastions of corporatism and established interests. Moreover, lands owned by the universities and utilized for their support, represented a source of wealth to be tapped by the revolutionary government, just as property possessed by the French Catholic Church had been confiscated. In 1792, the University of Provence, along with twenty-one other universities, was dissolved. Specialized ecoles, with rigorous entrance examinations and open to anyone with talent, were eventually created in order to offer professional training in specialized areas. Nonetheless, the government found it necessary to allow the faculties of law and medicine to continue in Aix-en-Provence and Marseille in the early 19th century.

=== Modern era (1800–1968) ===
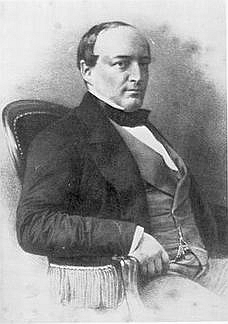
Hippolyte Fortoul, former Minister of Education of France, who served as the first Dean of the Faculty of French Literature

The founding of the Imperial University of France in 1806 marked a pivotal moment in the educational landscape at the dawn of the 19th century; it was one of the cornerstones of Napoleon's institutional reconstruction. Dedicated entirely to cultivating the managerial workforce that the country urgently needed, the Imperial University particularly focused on the fields of law and medicine. Consequently, in 1804, twelve law schools were reinstated by Napoleon, including that of Aix, which became part of the Imperial University in 1806. In 1818, École de Médecine was created in Marseille in order to train doctors in colonial medicine for France's expanding colonial empire. Subsequently, additional faculties were opened in Aix-en-Provence and Marseille to serve the changing needs of French society. For instance, Hippolyte Fortoul, who later served as Minister of the Navy and Colonies of France and then as Minister of Education and Public Worship of France, was the first dean and professor of a new faculty in French literature that was established with the approval of Louis Philippe I at Aix-en-Provence in 1846. Later, the departmental council of the Bouches-du-Rhône founded a chair in the faculty of letters at Aix-en-Provence in the language and literature of southern Europe; their aim was to assist the commercial exploitation of the region by French business. In 1854, a new science faculty was created in Marseille to support the growing industrialization of the region.

The most significant development for the university in the 19th century, nevertheless, was the recreation of French universities in 1896. The various faculties in Aix-en-Provence and Marseille were grouped into the new University of Aix-Marseille.

Through two world wars and an economic depression, the University of Aix-Marseille continued to develop. Increasing numbers of women and foreign students joined the student body, and an overwhelming majority of students majored in the science, medicine, and law. Individual faculties were almost autonomous from university administration and the Ministry of Education frequently intervened directly among the faculties.

=== Recent history (1968–present) ===
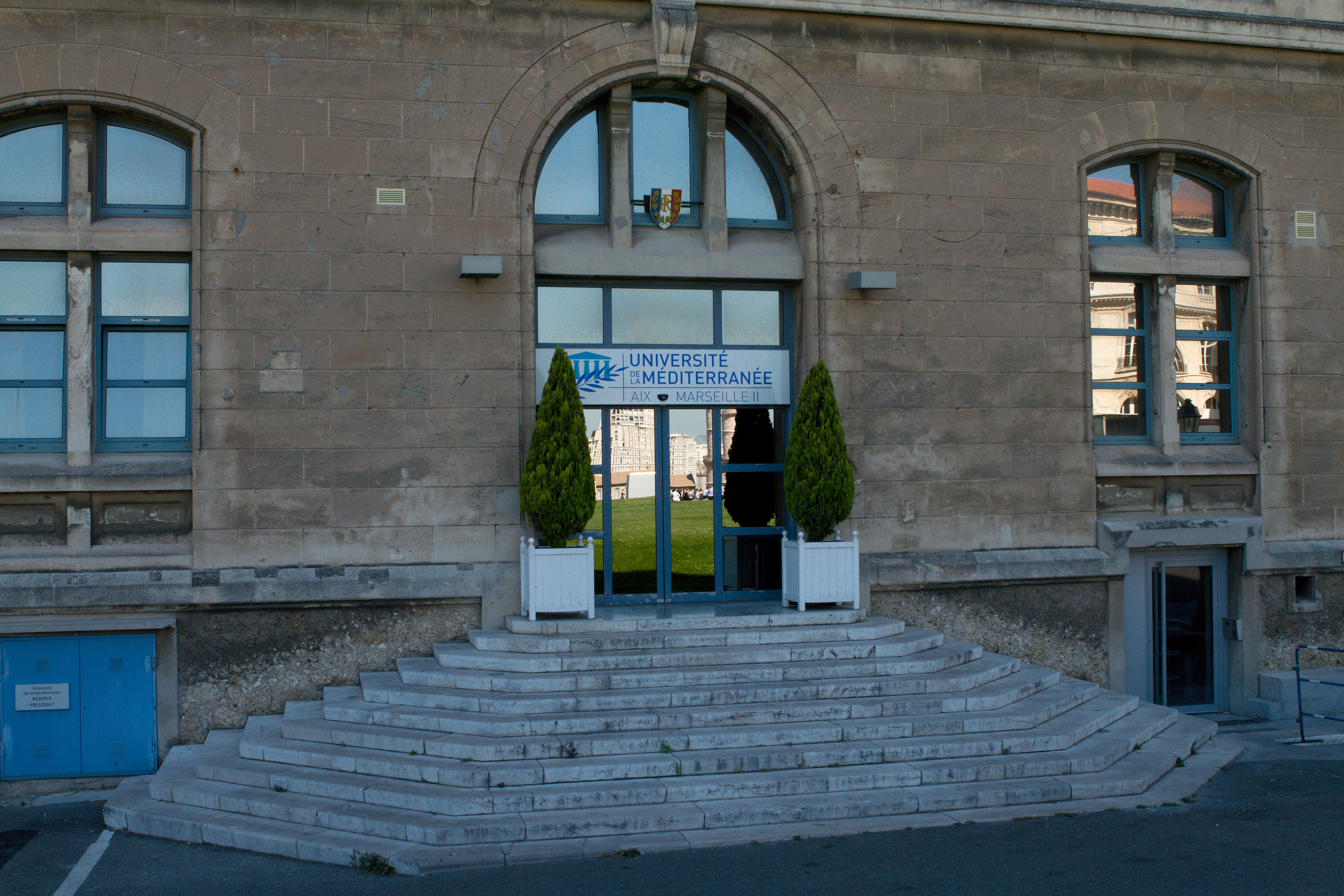
Former seat of the University of the Mediterranean Aix-Marseille II, built in 1896, that currently houses the university's headquarters

Following riots among university students in May 1968, a reform of French education occurred. The Orientation Act (Loi d'Orientation de l'Enseignement Superieur) of 1968 divided the old faculties into smaller subject departments, decreased the power of the Ministry of Education, and created smaller universities, with strengthened administrations. Subsequently, the University of Aix-Marseille was divided into two institutions. Each university had different areas of concentration of study and the faculties were divided as follows:

- University of Aix-Marseille I: law, political science, history, psychology, sociology, ethnology, philosophy, mathematics, physics, chemistry, natural sciences, languages, literature, and civilization
- University of Aix-Marseille II: economic science, geography, technology, medicine, pharmacy, dental surgery, topical medicine, physical education, and ocean science

In 1973, conservative faculty members led by Charles Debbasch, demanded and obtained the creation of the University of Aix-Marseille III, grouping law, political science, applied economics, earth science, ecology and technological studies.

Nearly 40 years later, in June 2007, the three universities of Aix-Marseille expressed their intention to reunite in order to form one university. The reunification was gradually prepared, respecting a schedule which allowed for long discussions at each stage, after which it was approved by vote of the Board of Directors of each university. Thus, Aix-Marseille University was re-established by decree No. 2011–1010 of 24 August 2011 and officially opened its doors on 1 January 2012.

== Organization ==
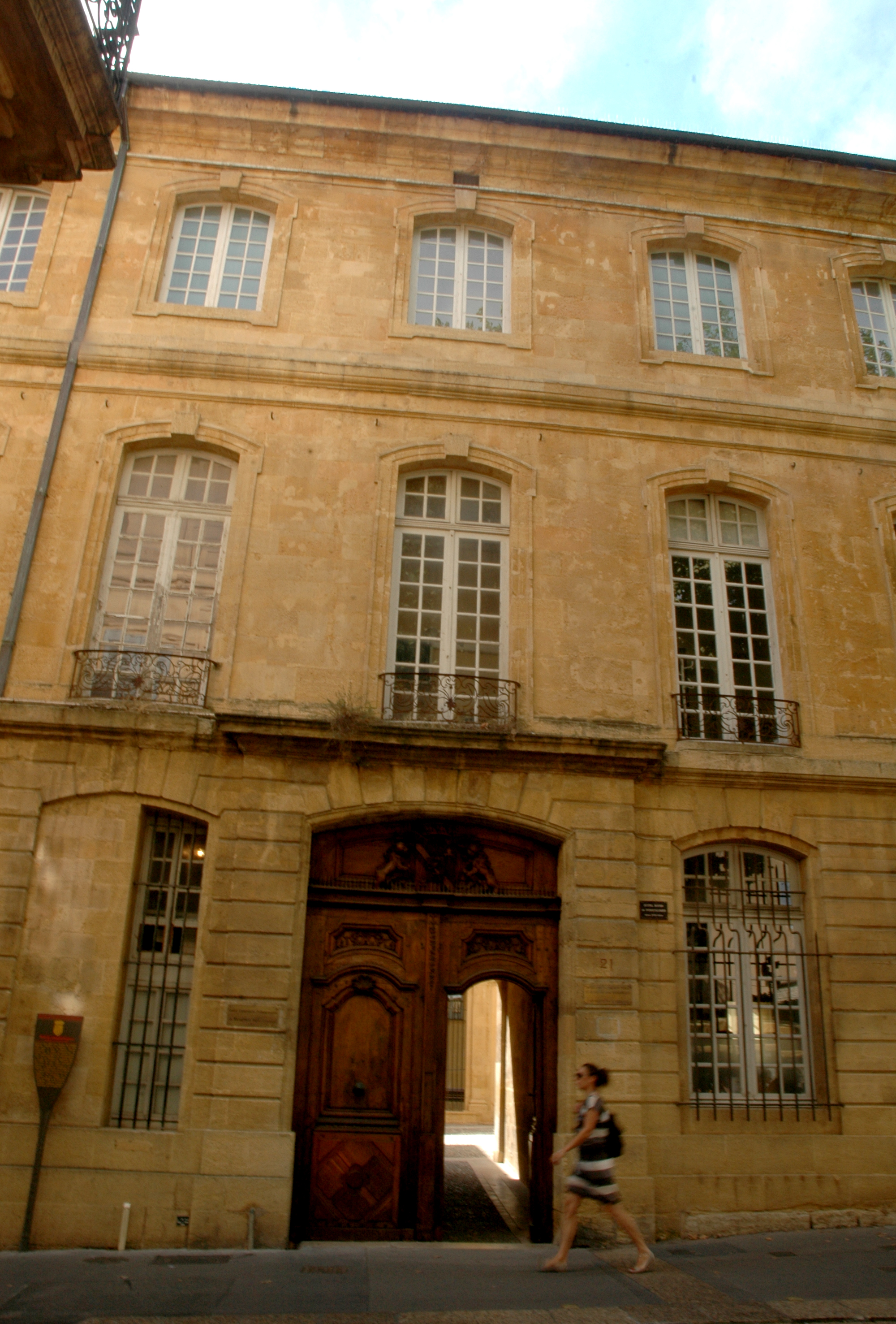
Hôtel Boyer de Fonscolombe, a monument historique built in c. 1642-1650, houses the Institute of Public Management and Territorial Governance

Aix-Marseille University's research and teaching is organised into five main sectors, each focusing on different areas of study:

- Law and Political Science
  - Faculty of Law and Political Science
  - Institute of Public Management and Territorial Governance
- Economics and Management
  - Faculty of Economics and Management
  - School of Journalism and Communication
  - Aix-Marseille Graduate School of Management
  - Regional Labour Institute
- Arts, Literature, Languages and Human Sciences
  - Faculty of Arts, Literature, Languages and Human Sciences
  - Training Center for Musicians
  - Mediterranean House of Human Sciences
  - Faculty of Medical and Paramedical Sciences
  - Faculty of Dentistry
  - Faculty of Pharmacy
- Sciences and Technology
  - Faculty of Sciences
  - Faculty of Sports
  - Pytheas Institute – Earth Sciences and Astronomy Observatory
  - Polytech Marseille
- Multidisciplinary Components
  - University Institute of Technology
  - Institute of Teaching and Education

There are also twenty-one thematic interdisciplinary institutes, which are funded and coordinated by Amidex fundation. Among those, four institutes have received funding as part of the France 2030 investment plan:

- Convergence Institutes
  - Centuri - Turing Centre for Living Systems
  - Institute of Language, Communication and the Brain (ILCB)
- University Research Schools
  - Aix-Marseille School of Economics (AMSE)
  - NeuroSchool (part of the NeuroMarseille Institute)

In addition, Sciences Po Aix (Institut d'Études Politiques d'Aix-en-Provence) operates as a separate and fully independent legal entity within the university and holds the status of grande école, which signifies its rigorous academic standards and highly selective admissions process.

== Governance ==
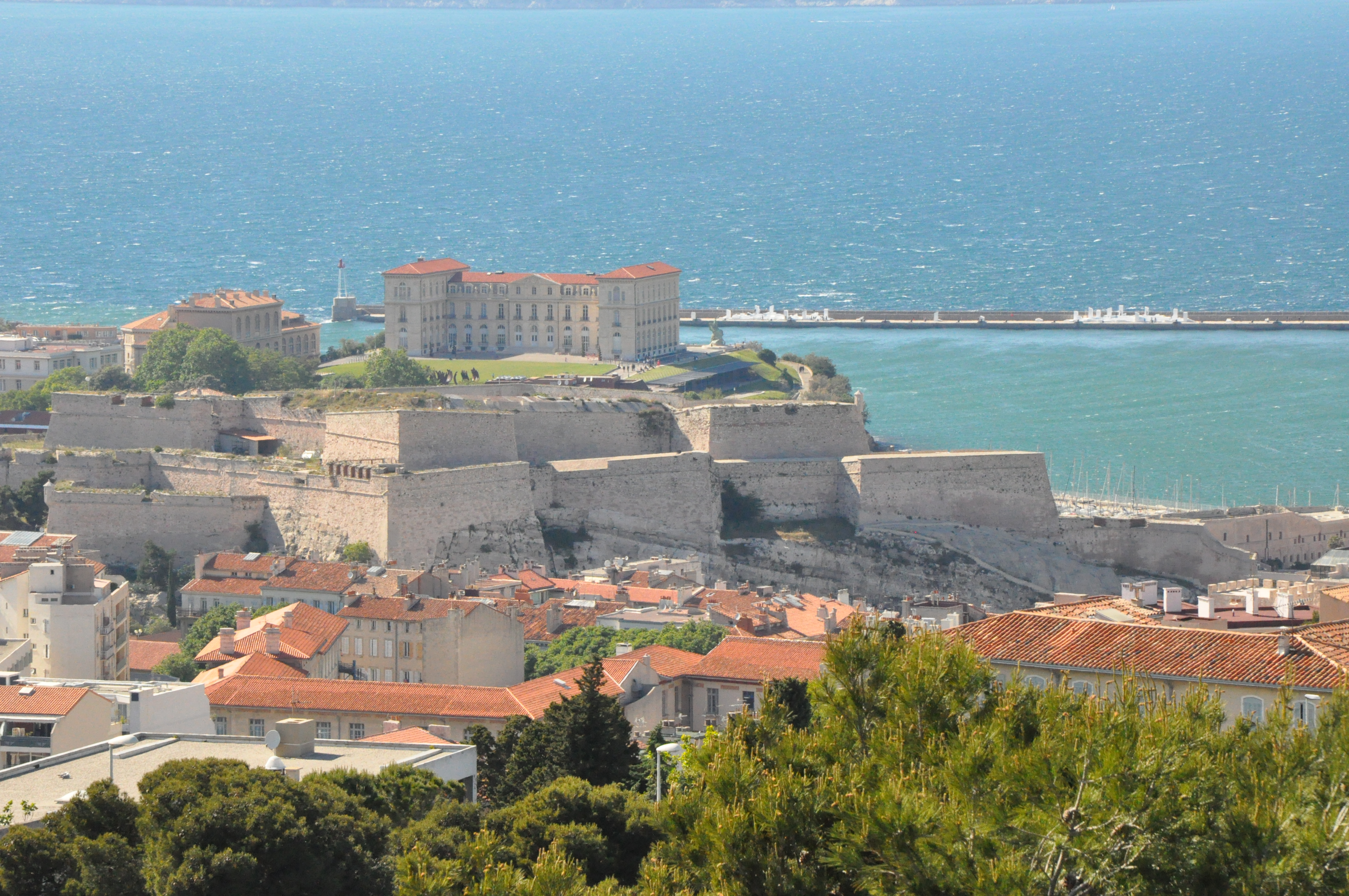
The headquarters for AMU is based in Le Pharo, the 7th arrondissement of Marseille

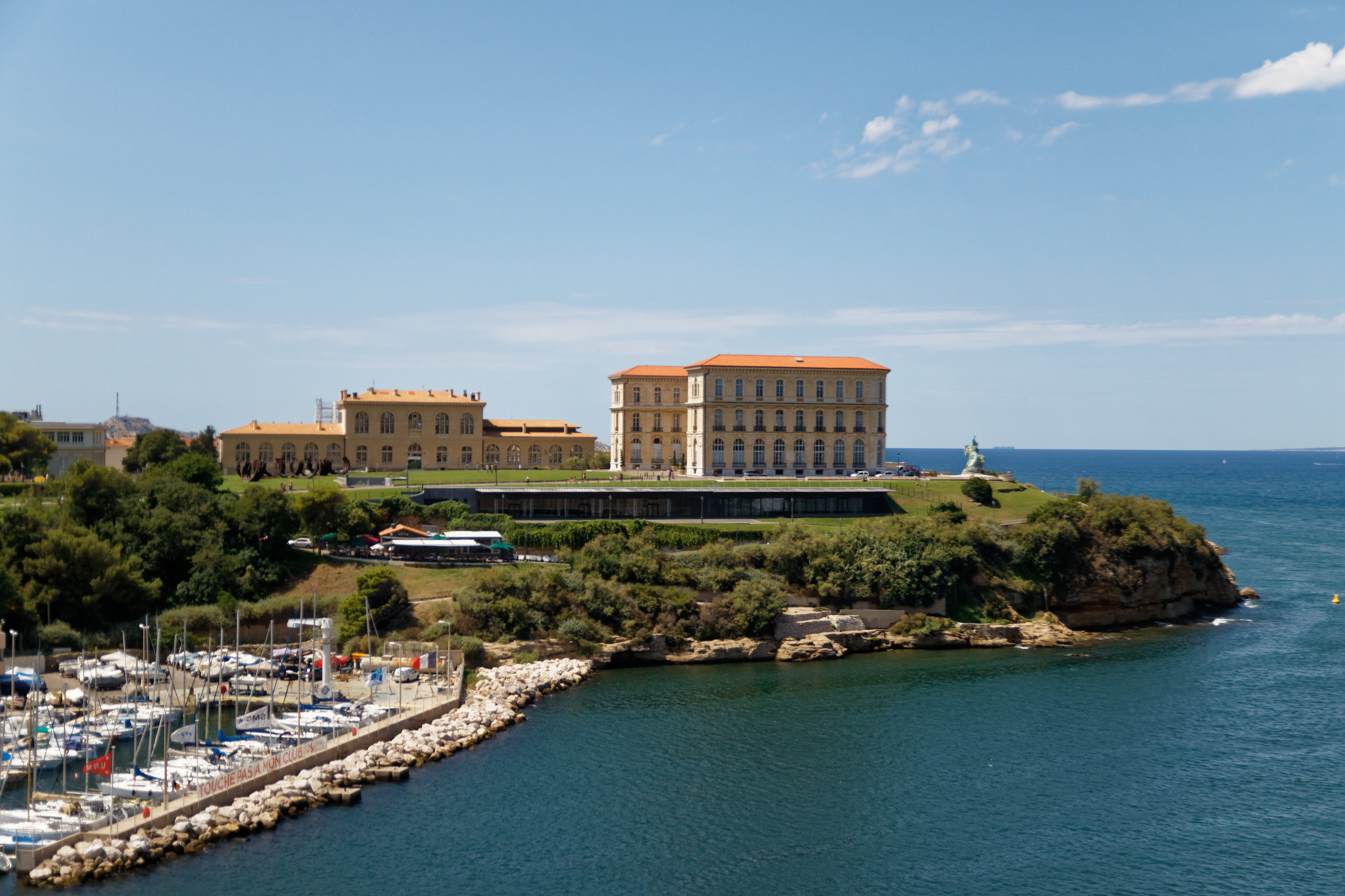
A view of the headquarters of the university from Fort Saint-Jean, Marseille

AMU is governed by the President, the Vice Presidents, the General Director of Services and Deputy Directors General of Services and the Accounting Officer. They meet on a weekly basis to discuss the main affairs of the university and to devise the strategic orientations which will be examined by the university councils. A second meeting with all the deans and directors takes place immediately afterwards to discuss more specific issues regarding internal activities of the various faculties and schools. The Administrative Council comprises 30 members: academics, teaching staff, administrative and technical personnel, students and external members. Its role is to determine the university general policy. The Academic Council consists of two bodies: The Research Committee, composed of 40 members, drafts policy proposals for research, scientific and technical documentation, and the allocation of research funding. The Education and Student Life Committee, composed of 40 members, drafts policy proposals on the curriculum, on requests for authorization and projects for new programs, and on the assessment of programs and teaching.

If the President of the university is the most important actor in defining the mission and the strategies of the university, he also has the necessary power to impulse or to sustain the projects that relate to these strategies. Before implementing these projects, they have to be accepted by the university council and if necessary they have to be included in the planning processes. There are two main planning processes in the definition of projects in the university that have to be followed in order to be financed or even authorised and accredited by the public (national and local) authorities. The first process takes place every six years and involves the central government, the region as well as the university. It is devoted to major investment projects, for instance building a new school, a new campus, a new library, etc. It is a catalogue of projects and for each of them it defines the financial burden accepted by each partner in the contract. The second process covers four years and has to be approved by the French Ministry of Education. In this process, the university sets its objectives at the pedagogical and research levels (new degrees, research projects). This planning process is very important because the university is free to define its own strategy, to be approved by the decision makers. Each process generates an important brainstorming period at all levels of the university in order to identify and build new ideas, new needs, and opportunities, to prioritise them, after an analysis of strengths and weaknesses. Other choices can be made after each process is closed, but they are more difficult to implement because other sources of funding and other ways of authorisation must be found.

== Academic profile ==
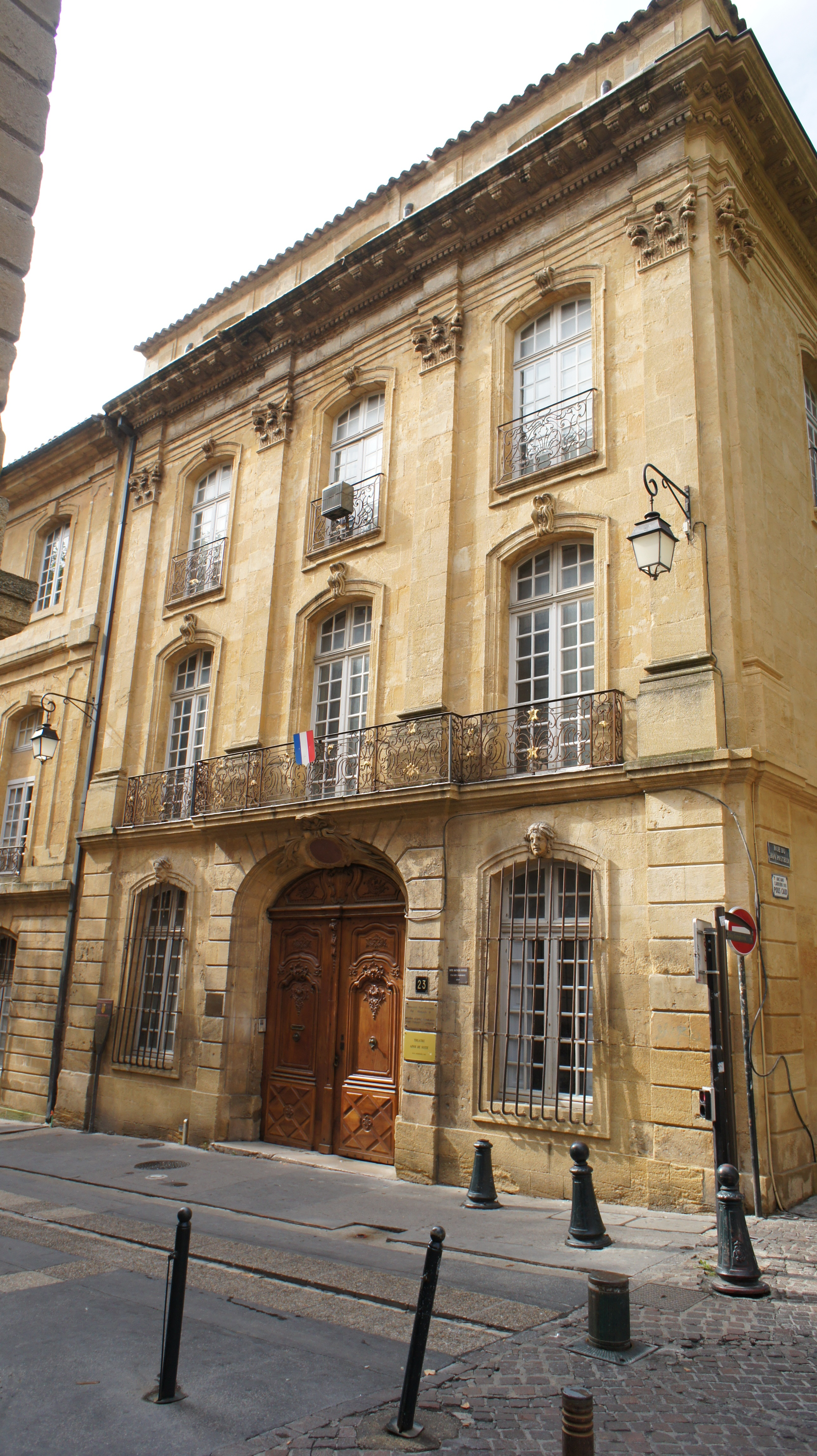
Hôtel Maynier d'Oppède, a monument historique built in 1757, former home of the IEFEE

Aix-Marseille University enrolls about 84,000 students, including more than 12,000 international students from 128 different countries. The university provides general and vocational courses, including 600 degree programs across various fields such as the Arts, Social Sciences, Health, Sport, Economics, Law, Political Sciences, Applied Economics, Management, and Exact Sciences like Mathematics, Data-processing, Physical Sciences, Astrophysical Sciences, Chemistry, and Biology. With 132 recognized research units and 21 faculties, it particularly concentrates on social and natural sciences. The university engages in the establishment of a European education and research area through over 500 international agreements and promotes mobility development. A policy targeted at Asian countries has resulted in an increase in enrolments of excellent international students. Programs in French and/or English have been arranged to enhance the welcome and integration of international students, particularly through the University Service of French as a Foreign Language (SUFLE). Its predecessor, the Institute of French Studies for Foreign Students (Institut d'Etudes Françaises Pour Etudiants Etrangers (IEFEE)) was founded in 1953 and was considered one of the premier French-language teaching centers in the country. About a thousand students from 65 countries attend the SUFLE throughout the academic year. It also serves as an important center for teachers of French for international learners, aimed at providing education and honing French linguistic capabilities as a tool for scientific and cultural communication. According to Harvard University's website, the university is "one of the most distinguished in France, second only to the University of Paris in the areas of French literature, history, and linguistics".

The university's library system comprises 59 libraries, with 662,000 volumes, 20,000 online periodical titles, and thousands of digital resources, making it one of the largest and most diverse academic library systems in France. The overall area occupied by the libraries is equal to 37,056 m^{2}, including 19,703 m^{2} public access space. The libraries offer 49.2 kilometers of open-stacks shelving and 4,219 seats for student study. In addition, there are 487 computer workstations, which are available to the public for research purposes.

=== Political Science ===
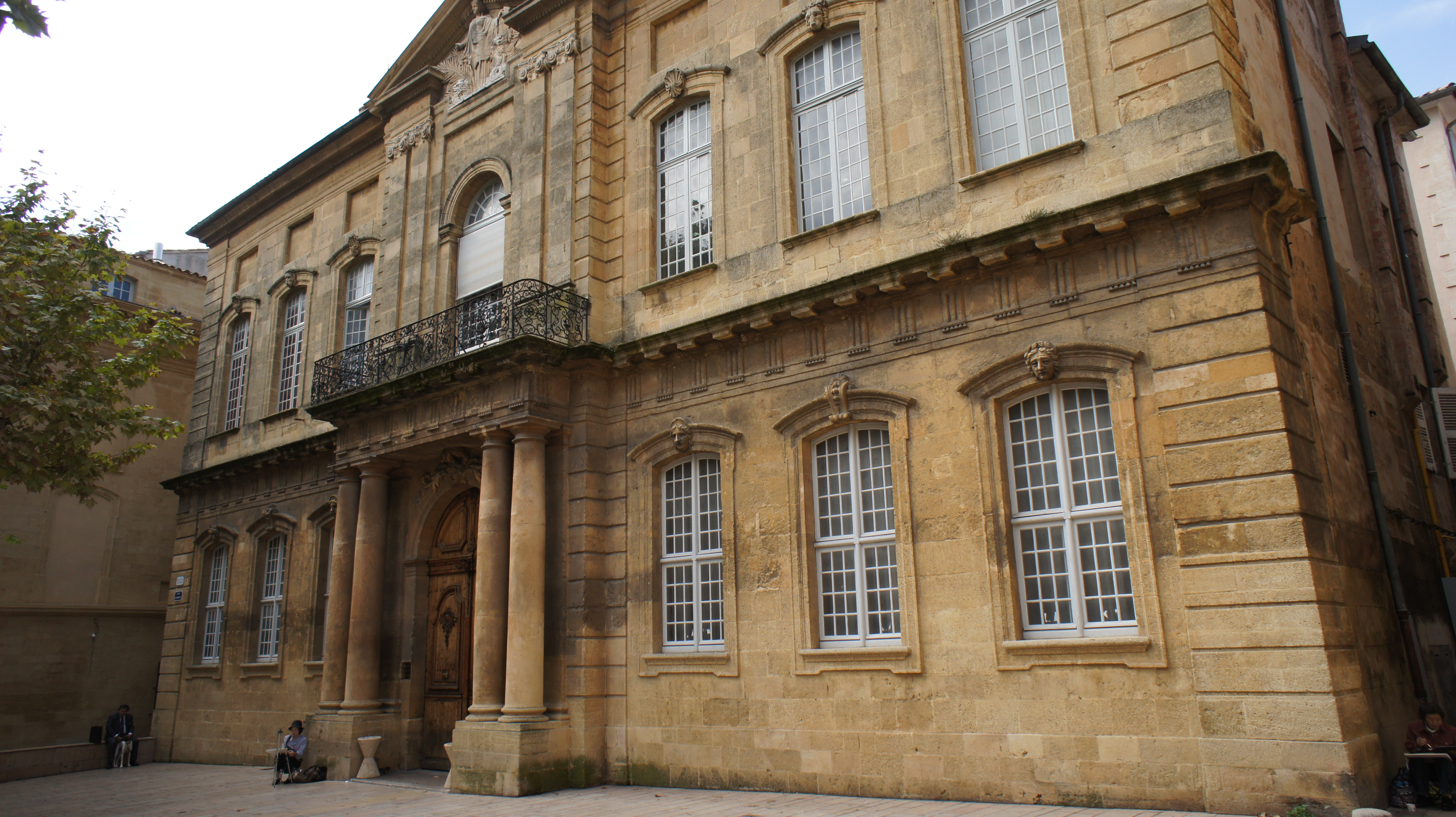
Sciences Po Aix is housed in the Place de l'Université, a monument historique built in 1734, designed by Georges Vallon

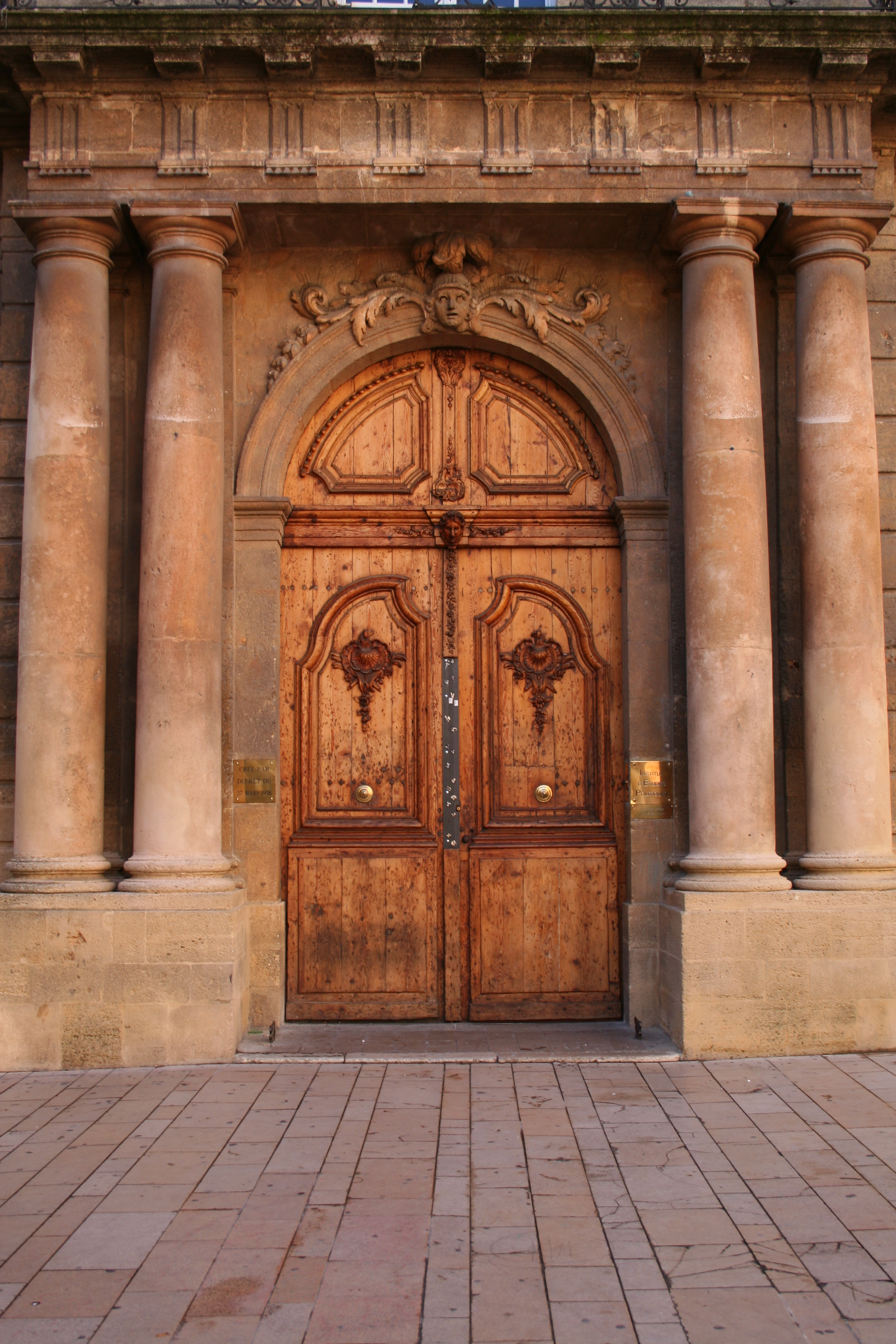
The main entrance of Sciences Po Aix

The university's Institute of Political Studies (Institut d'études politiques d'Aix-en-Provence), also known as Sciences Po Aix, was established in 1956. Sciences Po Aix is a distinct and fully autonomous legal entity within the university. It is one of a network of 10 world-famous IEPs (Instituts d'études politiques) in France, including those in Bordeaux, Grenoble, Lille, Lyon, Paris, Rennes, Saint-Germain-en-Laye, Strasbourg and Toulouse. Sciences Po Aix is a grande école in political science and its primary aim is to train senior executives for the public, semi-public, and private sectors. Although the institute offers a multitude of disciplines, its main focus is on politics, including related subjects such as history, law, economics, languages, international relations, and media studies. Its admissions process is among the toughest and most selective in the country. Sciences Po Aix has numerous exchange programs through partnerships with about 120 different universities in the world: the school therefore welcomes 200 foreign students a year. On top of these academic exchanges, students have the opportunity to do internships abroad in large international firms.

Many of the institute's graduates have gone on to high positions within both the French government and in foreign governments. Among the best-known people who studied at Sciences Po Aix are the current President of the European Central Bank (ECB), Christine Lagarde, former High Representative of the Union for Foreign Affairs and Security Policy and Vice-President of the European Commission, Federica Mogherini, the 5th President of Sri Lanka, Chandrika Kumaratunga, former Minister of Justice of France, Élisabeth Guigou, former Presidents of the National Assembly of France, Philippe Séguin and Patrick Ollier.

=== Law ===
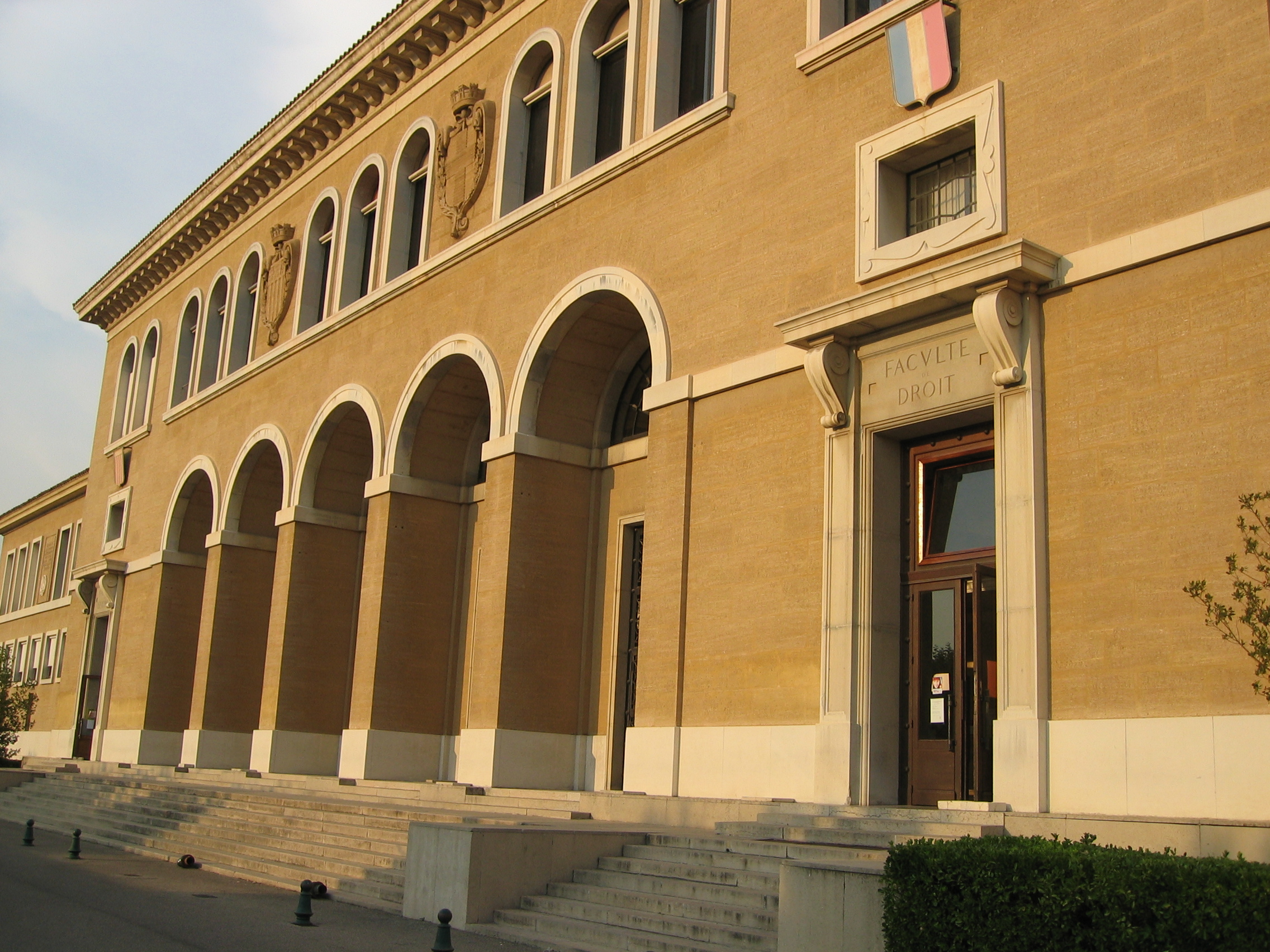
Faculty of Law and Political Science, designated as architecture contemporaine remarquable built in 1955, designed by Fernand Pouillon

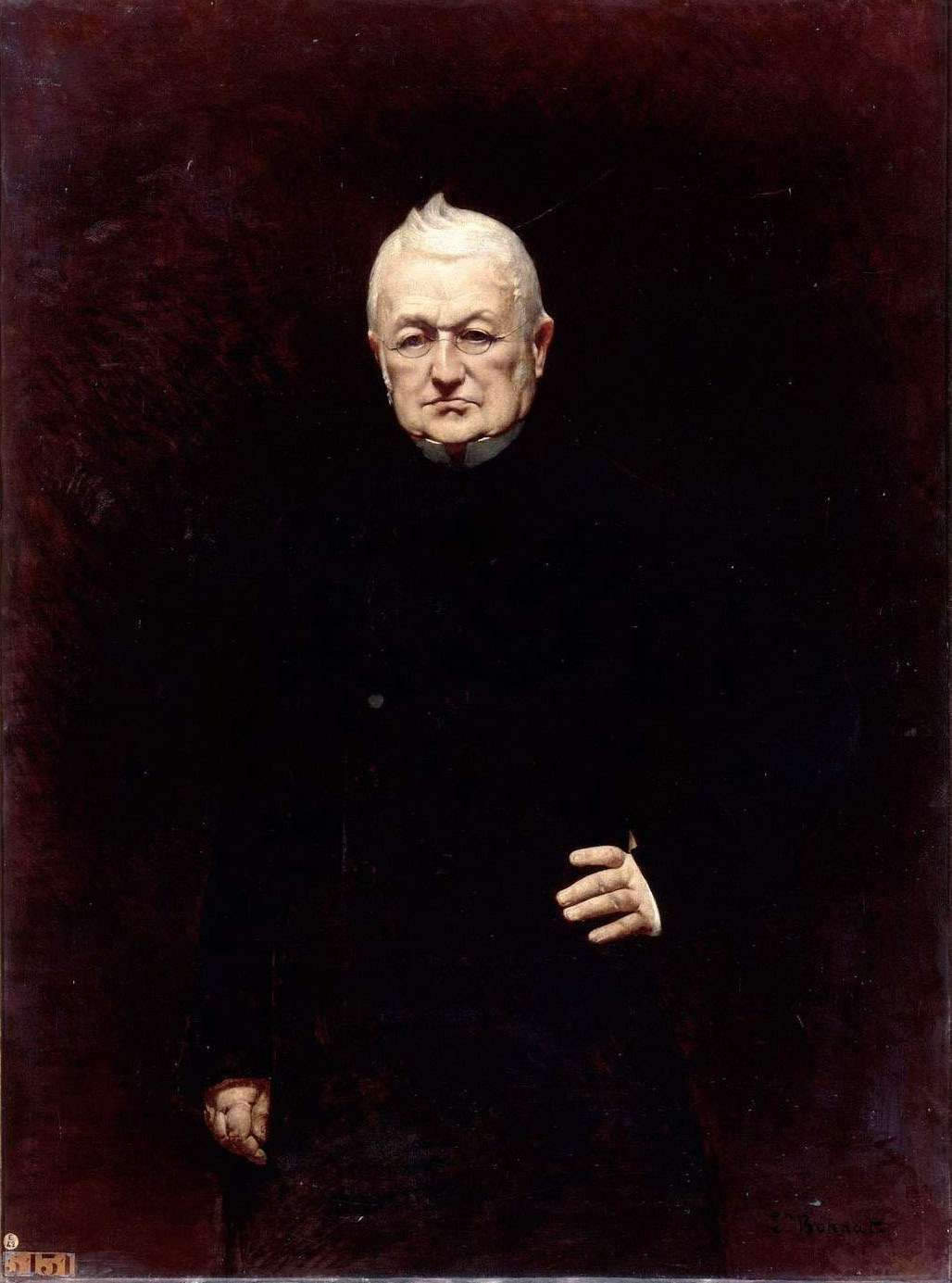
2nd President of France, Adolphe Thiers, graduated from the university's law school in 1818; a portrait painted by Léon Bonnat in 1876, currently kept at the Palace of Versailles

The establishment of the law school at AMU can be traced back to the university's foundation in 1409. The school had far-reaching influence, since written law, which in France originated in Aix-en-Provence, spread from there, eventually replacing the common law practiced throughout the rest of northern Gaul. The law school has a long tradition of self-management, with a strongly institutionalized culture and practices enrooted in the social and economic realities of the region. Today, it is one of the largest law schools in France, and is considered to be one of the nation's leading centers for legal research and teaching. The school is unique among French law schools for the breadth of courses offered and the extent of research undertaken in a wide range of fields. For 2024, the law school is ranked 4th in France for its undergraduate studies by THE, QS, and Le Figaro rankings, 5th by Parcoursup, and 7th by Eduniversal. According to the University of Connecticut's website, "other than the Sorbonne, Aix has attracted the most prestigious law faculty in France". The teaching faculty comprises 155 professors and 172 adjunct lecturers, the latter drawn from private practice, the civil service, the judiciary and other organizations. Much of the legal research at the university is done under the auspices of its many research institutes – there is one in almost every field of law. Research activity is buttressed by a network of libraries, which holds an impressive collection of monographs and periodicals, including an important collection of 16th-century manuscripts. Moreover, the libraries have several specialized rooms dedicated to specific fields of law, in particular in International and European Law and Legal Theory.

The school has produced a large number of French luminaries in law and politics including the 2nd President of France, Adolphe Thiers, the former President of the Provisional Government and Prime Minister of France, as well as the past President of the National Assembly of France, Félix Gouin, the former Prime Minister of France, Édouard Balladur, the former Minister of State and the Interior of France, Gaston Defferre, and the former Minister of Justice of France, Adolphe Crémieux. The school has also educated two Nobel laureates: René Cassin, winner of the 1968 Nobel Peace Prize, and Frédéric Mistral, winner of the 1904 Nobel Prize in Literature. Alumni also encompass notable international political figures, including the 3rd President of Lebanon, Émile Eddé, the former Prime Minister of Bulgaria, Vasil Kolarov, the former Prime Minister of Angola, Fernando José de França Dias Van-Dúnem, and the former Prime Minister of Cambodia, Norodom Ranariddh. In addition, from 1858 to 1861, a prominent French artist and Post-Impressionist painter Paul Cézanne attended the school, while also receiving drawing lessons.

=== Business and Management Studies ===
The Aix-Marseille Graduate School of Management, commonly known as IAE Aix-en-Provence, was the first Graduate School of Management in the French public university system. According to The Independent, IAE Aix is "a prestigious, double-accredited institution, with an international approach to business combining both classic and innovative teaching methods". It is the only French public university entity to receive dual international accreditation: the European standard of excellence EQUIS in 1999, and the AMBA accreditation in 2004 for its MBA Change & Innovation, in 2005 for its master's programs and in 2007 for its Executive Part-time MBA. The school is composed of 40 permanent faculty members, and invites more than 30 international professors and 150 business speakers each year to conduct lectures and courses within the various programs. IAE Aix offers graduate level programs in general management, international management, internal audit of organisations, service management, internal and external communications management, management and information technologies, international financial management and applied marketing. In 2011, the M.Sc. in General Management was ranked 2nd in France along with the M.Sc. in Services Management and Marketing being ranked 3rd and the M.Sc. in Audit and Corporate Governance also being ranked 3rd in the country by SMBG.

In 1990, IAE Aix and ESSEC Business School (École Supérieure des Sciences Economiques et Commerciales) signed an agreement to unite and offer a joint Doctorate Program, allowing ESSEC professors to teach in the Research Oriented Master program in Aix-en-Provence. Furthermore, after Research Oriented Master graduation, students can attend the ESSEC Doctorate seminars and have an ESSEC Research Advisor (Directeur de Recherche). In the same way, ESSEC students can enroll in the IAE Aix's Research Oriented Master and Doctorate programs. In both cases, the members of the thesis juries come from both IAE Aix and ESSEC. The Doctorate title is awarded by Aix-Marseille University.

=== Economics ===
Aix-Marseille School of Economics (AMSE) is a gathering of three big laboratories in economics, part of AMU: GREQAM (Groupement de Recherche en Economie Quantitative d'Aix Marseille), SESSTIM (Sciences Économiques & Sociales de la Santé & Traitement de l'Information Médicale), and IDEP (Institut D'Economie Publique). GREQAM is a research center which specializes in all areas of economics, with strong concentrations in macroeconomics, econometrics, game theory, economic philosophy and public economics. It counts two Fellows of the Econometric Society among its members, and is consistently ranked as one of the top 5 research centers in economics in France. SESSTIM consists of three teams in social and economic sciences, as well as social epidemiology, focusing on applications in the following fields: cancer, infectious and transmissible diseases, and aging. IDEP aims at federating competences in the field of Public Economics broadly defined as the part of economics that studies the causes and the consequences of public intervention in the economic sphere.

AMSE has a triple aim in terms of research development about "Globalization and public action", education regarding Master and PhD degrees and valorization toward local authorities, administrations and corporations, and of information aiming at all public. The AMSE Master is a two-year Master program in Economics jointly organized with the School for Advanced Studies in the Social Sciences (EHESS) and Centrale Méditerranée. It aims to provide high-level courses and training in the main fields of specialization of AMSE: Development Economics, Econometrics, Public Economics, Environmental Economics, Finance/Insurance, Macroeconomics, Economic Philosophy, and Health Economics. The doctoral program of AMSE brings together more than seventy PhD students. Ten to fifteen new PhD students join the program each year. These PhD students cover all the research topics available at AMSE. The PhD program is a member of the European Doctoral Group in Economics (EDGE) with the University of Cambridge, the University of Copenhagen, University College Dublin, Bocconi University, and LMU Munich.

=== Medicine ===
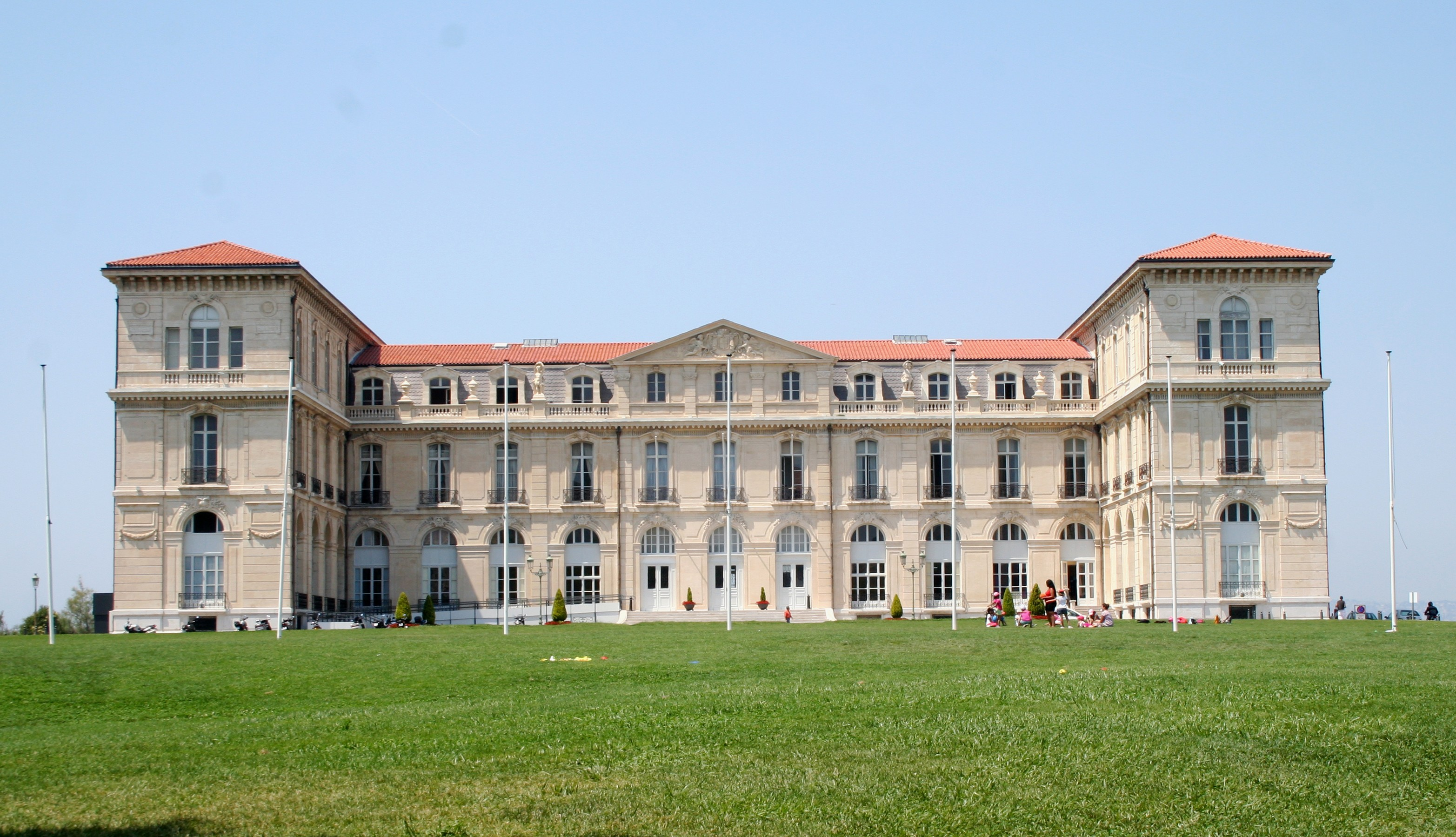
Palais du Pharo, a monument historique built in 1858, former home of the Faculty of Medicine

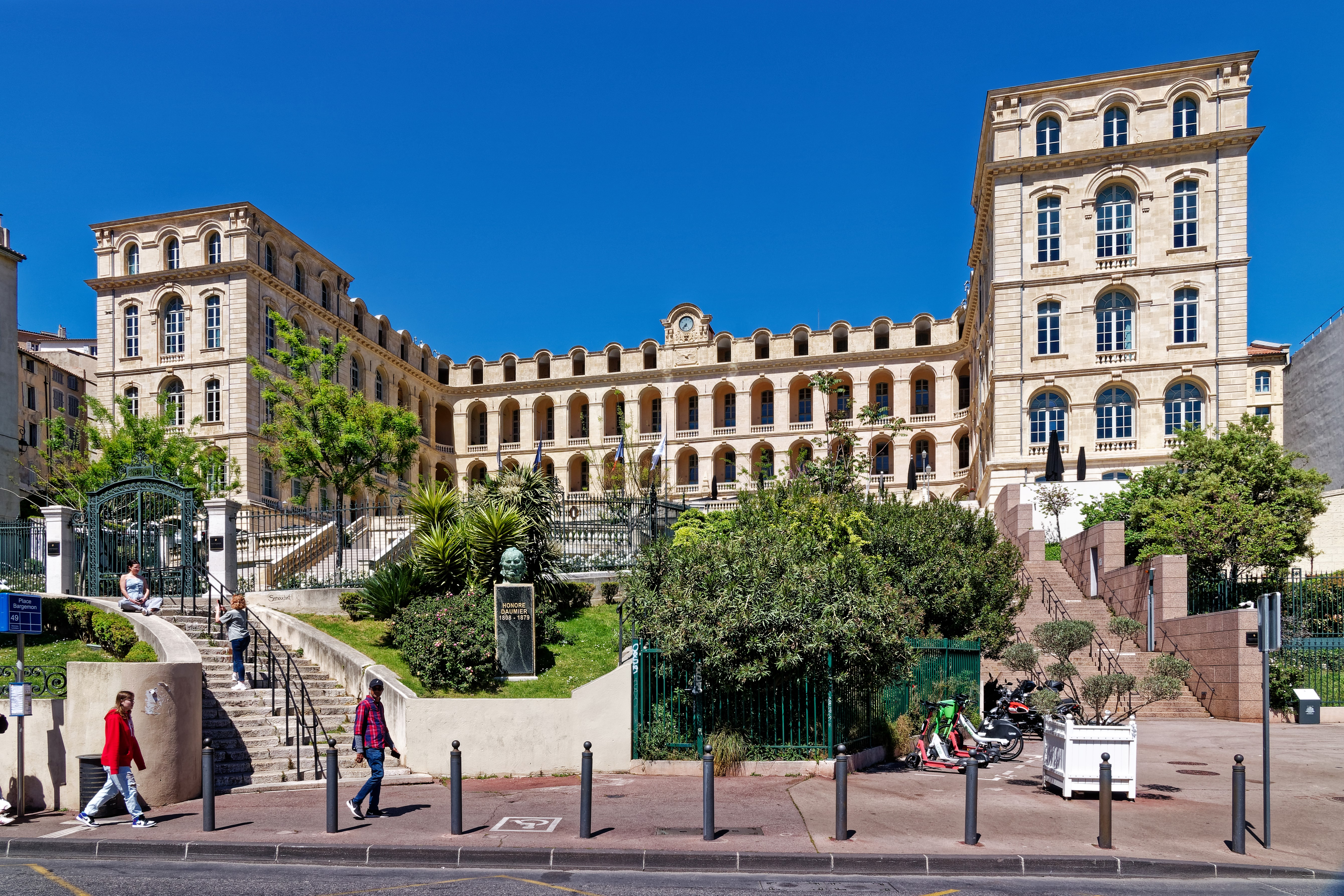
Hôtel-Dieu de Marseille, built in 1753, former home of the École de Médecine et de Pharmacie

The Faculty of Medicine at AMU can trace its origins to 1413 and was officially designated as a Faculty of Medical Arts in 1557. In 1645, it was transformed into a college of medicine and recognized by a decree issued by the Council of State in 1683. During the revolution, although a faculty of medicine was created in Montpellier, Marseille was left aside, probably because of its close proximity. In 1818, École de Médecine et de Pharmacie was founded at Hôtel-Dieu and this later became an École de Plein Exercice. This educational establishment experienced remarkable success and continued to expand, enrolling 37 students in the official program and 24 in the doctoral track in 1835. By 1893, the student body had grown to 360, with 153 pursuing a degree in medicine. As the number of students increased, the facilities became insufficient, leading to the relocation of the school to the Pavillon Daviel in 1875, and subsequently to the Palais du Pharo in 1893. However, it was not until 1930 that a faculty of medicine was formally organised in Marseille. The town's geographical position meant that it was able to exert a strong influence upon the Mediterranean. The most significant example of this was Antoine Clot, known as Clot Bey, who with the help of Muhammad Ali of Egypt, founded a school of medicine in Cairo in 1827. This enabled Egyptian students to travel to France and encouraged exchanges between western and eastern medicine. In Marseille, medical practices adapted to tropical diseases developed under the influence of the military department of medicine. Physiology at the faculty dates back to Charles-Marie Livon, who was named professeur suppléant (deputy professor) and then professeur agrégé (associate professor) of anatomy and physiology having presented his thesis in Paris. He conducted research on hypophysis and pneumogastric physiology, which earned him the Monthyon Prize at the French Academy of Sciences. Following his work with Louis Pasteur, he opened an anti-rabies clinic and became Mayor of Marseille in 1895. The first dean of the faculty was Leon Imbert, who arrived in Marseille in 1904 as a former interne des hôpitaux and professeur agrégé at the Montpellier faculty. Originally a surgeon, he established one of the first centers for maxillofacial prosthetics for the gueules cassées (broken faces) of the Great War. An anti-cancer center was developed by Lucien Cornill, who was originally from Vichy and studied in Paris. During the First World War, he worked at the neurological center in the 7th Military region of Besançon under the supervision of Gustave Roussy. After the war, he became a professeur agrégé of pathological anatomy. He became dean of the faculty in 1937 and held this position until 1952. His main work related to clinical neurology and medullary pathology.

The Faculty of Pharmacy began its independent operations after separating from the main faculty in 1970. Subsequently, the Faculty of Dentistry also became independent from the Faculty of Medicine, allowing for more specialized programs. Therefore, these three faculties constitute the Division of Health at the university.

=== Earth Sciences and Astronomy ===
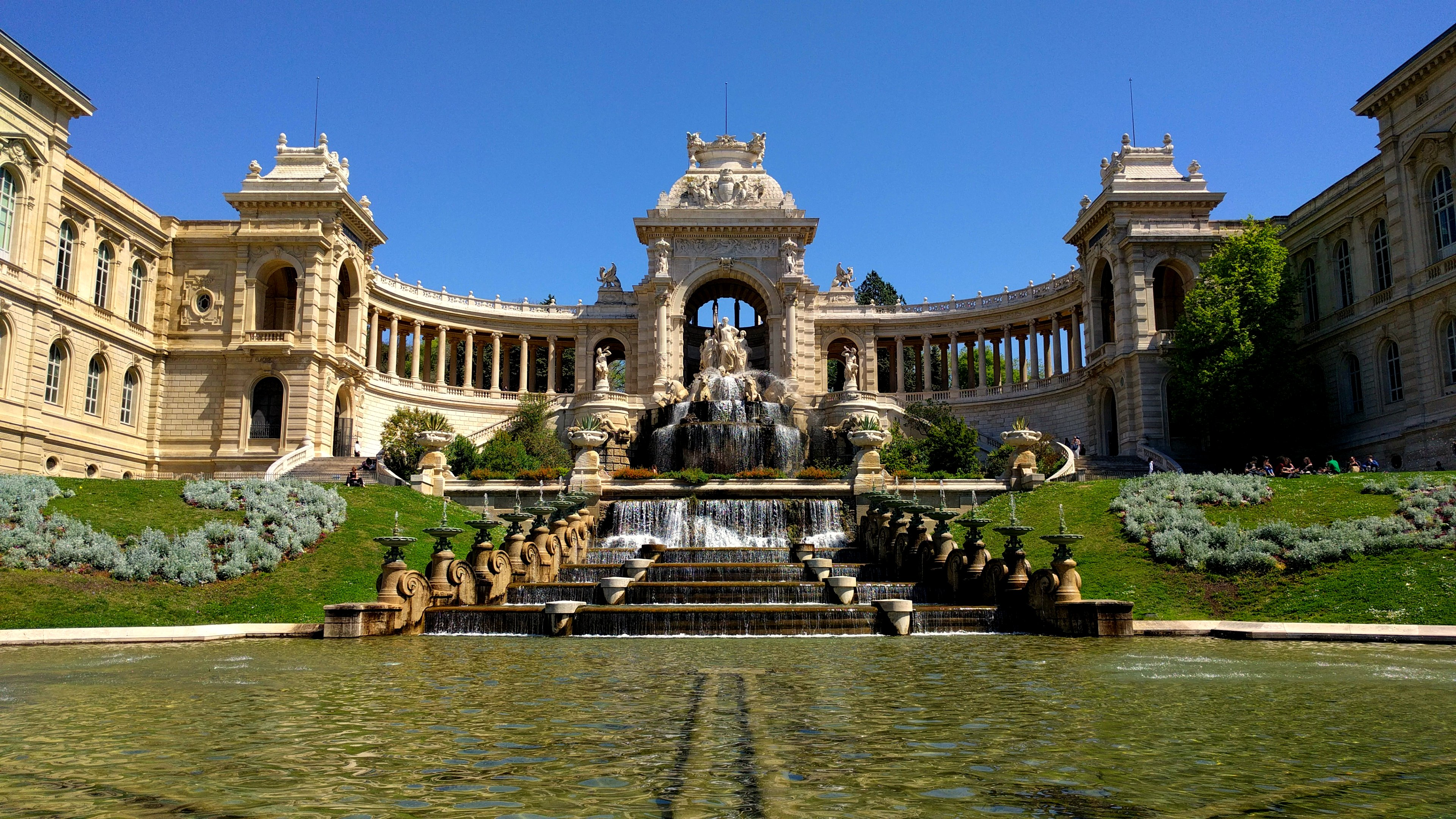
The old Marseille Observatory of the university is housed inside the Palais Longchamp facilities, a monument historique built in 1869

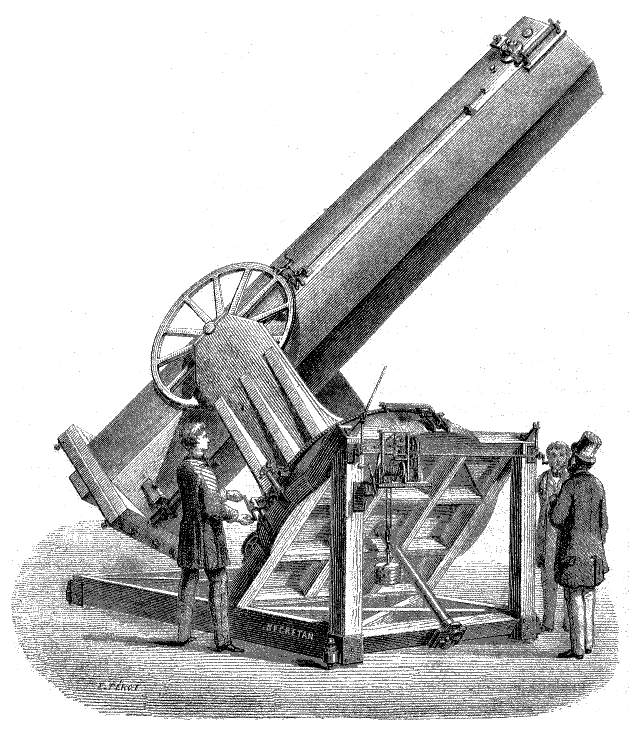
Drawing of the 80 cm telescope by Léon Foucault, Observatoire de Marseille, 1873

The university's Astronomy Observatory of Marseille-Provence (OAMP) was established in 1702. It is one of the French National Observatories under the auspices of the National Institute of Astronomy (INSU) of the National Centre for Scientific Research (CNRS), with a large financial participation by the National Centre for Space Studies (CNES). Basic research at the OAMP is organized around three priority themes: cosmology and research on dark matter and dark energy, galaxy formation and evolution, stellar and planetary system formation and exploration of the Solar System. The OAMP also contributes to the area of environmental sciences and especially the study of the climatic system. The OAMP is very active in technological research and development, mainly in optics and opto-mechanics, for the development of the main observational instruments that will be deployed on the ground and in space in the coming decades. For many years OAMP research teams have had close ties with the French and European space and optical industry. The OAMP takes part in university education in astrophysics, physics and mathematics, as well as in instrumentation and signal processing from the first year of university to the doctorate level. These programs lead to openings in the fields of research and high-tech industry. The OAMP organizes many astronomy outreach activities in order to share important discoveries with the public. The OAMP consists of two establishments: the Laboratory of Astrophysics of Marseille (LAM) and the Haute-Provence Observatory (OHP), along with the Département Gassendi, which is a common administrative and technical support unit. With over 50 researchers, 160 engineers, technical and administrative personnel, plus some 20 graduate students and post-docs, the OAMP is one of the most important research institutes in the region.

=== Engineering ===
Polytech Marseille is a Grande École d'Ingénieurs (Graduate School of Science and Engineering), part of AMU. The School offers 8 specialist courses in emerging technologies which lead to an engineering degree after 5 years of studies. Polytech Marseille is also a member of the Polytech Group which comprises 13 engineering schools of French leading universities. Polytech Marseille's advanced level courses have a strong professional focus. They include compulsory work placements in a professional organisation. These programs also benefit from a top rank scientific environment, with teaching staff drawn from laboratories attached to major French research organisations that are among the leaders in their field. Students are recruited on the basis of a selective admissions process which goes via one of two nationwide competitive admissions examinations (concours): either after the baccalauréat (national secondary school graduation examination) for admission to a five-year course or after two years of higher education for admission to a three-year course. The courses are approved by the Commission des Titres d'Ingénieur (CTI), the French authority that authorizes recognised engineering schools to deliver the Diplôme d'Ingénieur (a state-recognised title, recognised equivalent to a "Master in Engineering" by AACRAO) and thus guarantees the quality of the courses. The courses are also accredited by EUR-ACE.

== Rankings and reputation ==
University rankings
Rankings	World	Europe	National
ARWU	=151	=48	=6
CWTS	256	63	5
QS	=443	164	10
THE	=401	=187	=11
USNWR	=247	92	5

In the 2025 Academic Ranking of World Universities (ARWU), AMU was ranked joint 151st–200th in the world. In the subject tables it was ranked joint 51st–75th in the world for Physics and Oceanography, joint 76th–100th in the world for Public Health and Mathematics, joint 101st–150th in the world for Ecology, Mechanical Engineering, Human Biological Sciences, Clinical Medicine, Medical Technology, Dentistry and Oral Sciences, and joint 151st–200th in the world for Biology and Earth Sciences.

In the 2025 Times Higher Education World University Rankings (THE), AMU was ranked joint 401st–500th in the world. In the subject tables it was ranked joint 126th–150th in the world for Arts and Humanities, joint 201st–250th in the world for Medical and Health, and joint 251st–300th in the world for Education Studies, Law, Life Sciences, Psychology, and Physical Sciences.

In the 2026 QS World University Rankings (QS), AMU was ranked joint 428th in the world. In the subject tables it was ranked joint 34th in the world for Archaeology, joint 51st–150th in the world for Classics and Ancient History, joint 101st–170th in the world for Anthropology, Anatomy and Physiology, joint 147th in the world for Biological Sciences, joint 151st–200th in the world for Physics and Astronomy, Earth and Marine Sciences, Geology, Geophysics, and Environmental Sciences, joint 201st–250th in the world for English Language and Literature, Chemistry, History, Mathematics, and Medicine, and joint 251st–300th in the world for Chemical Engineering, Law, Linguistics, Modern Languages, and Psychology.

In the 2025/26 U.S. News & World Report Best Global Universities Ranking, AMU was ranked joint 226th in the world. In the subject tables it was ranked joint 51st in the world for Marine and Freshwater Biology, 53rd in the world for Oncology, joint 54th in the world for Infectious Diseases, joint 63rd in the world for Microbiology, 74th in the world for Space Science, 87th in the world for Immunology, 105th in the world for Physics, 118th in the world for Ecology, 122nd in the world for Biology and Biochemistry, 131st in the world for Pharmacology and Toxicology, 135th in the world for Cell Biology, 143rd in the world for Polymer Science and Surgery, joint 146th in the world for Neuroscience and Behaviour, and 150th in the world for Geosciences.

In the 2025 CWTS Leiden Ranking, AMU was ranked 226th in the world.

In the 2024/25 University Ranking by Academic Performance (URAP), AMU was ranked 143rd in the world.

In the 2025 Center for World University Rankings (CWUR), AMU was ranked 169th in the world.

In the 2019 Reuters - The World's Most Innovative Universities ranking, AMU was ranked 96th in the world.

== University presses ==
Aix-Marseille University is affiliated with two university presses: Presses Universitaires de Provence (PUP) and Presses Universitaires d'Aix-Marseille (PUAM); the former is dedicated to the publication of works in the humanities and hard sciences, whereas the latter is devoted to the publication of legal works.

== Notable alumni ==
AMU has produced many alumni that have distinguished themselves in their respective fields. Notable AMU alumni include four Nobel Prize laureates, a two-time recipient of the Pulitzer Prize, six César Award winners, four Olympic medalists and numerous members of the component academies of the Institut de France. AMU has a large number of alumni who have been active in politics, including multiple heads of state or government, parliamentary speakers, government ministers, over a hundred members of the National Assembly of France, at least fifty members of the Senate of France, and fourteen members of the European Parliament (EP).

== Notable faculty and staff ==
=== Nobel laureates ===
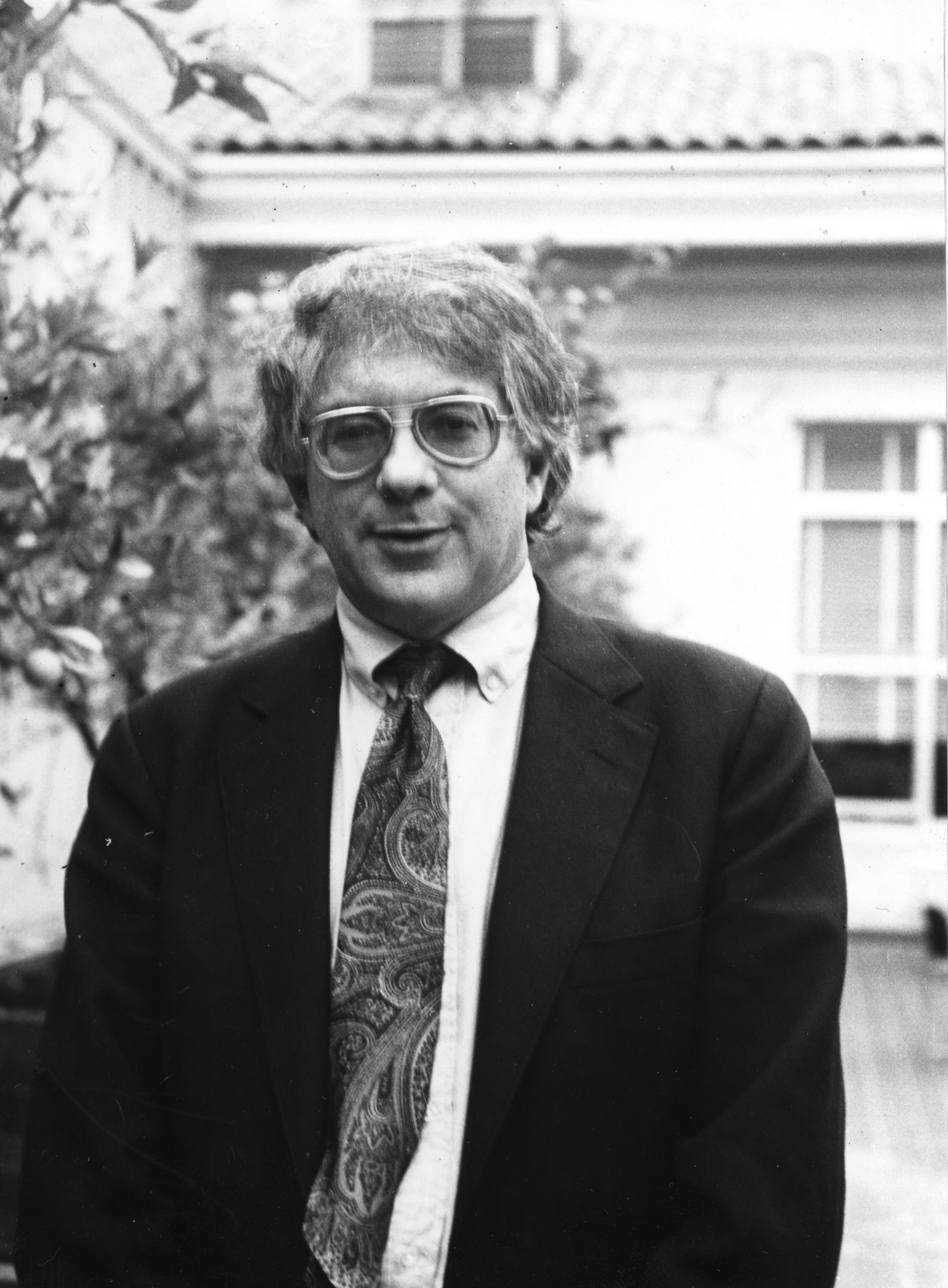
Sheldon Glashow, winner of the 1979 Nobel Prize in Physics

- Sheldon Glashow – winner of the 1979 Nobel Prize in Physics

=== Politics and government ===
==== Foreign politicians ====
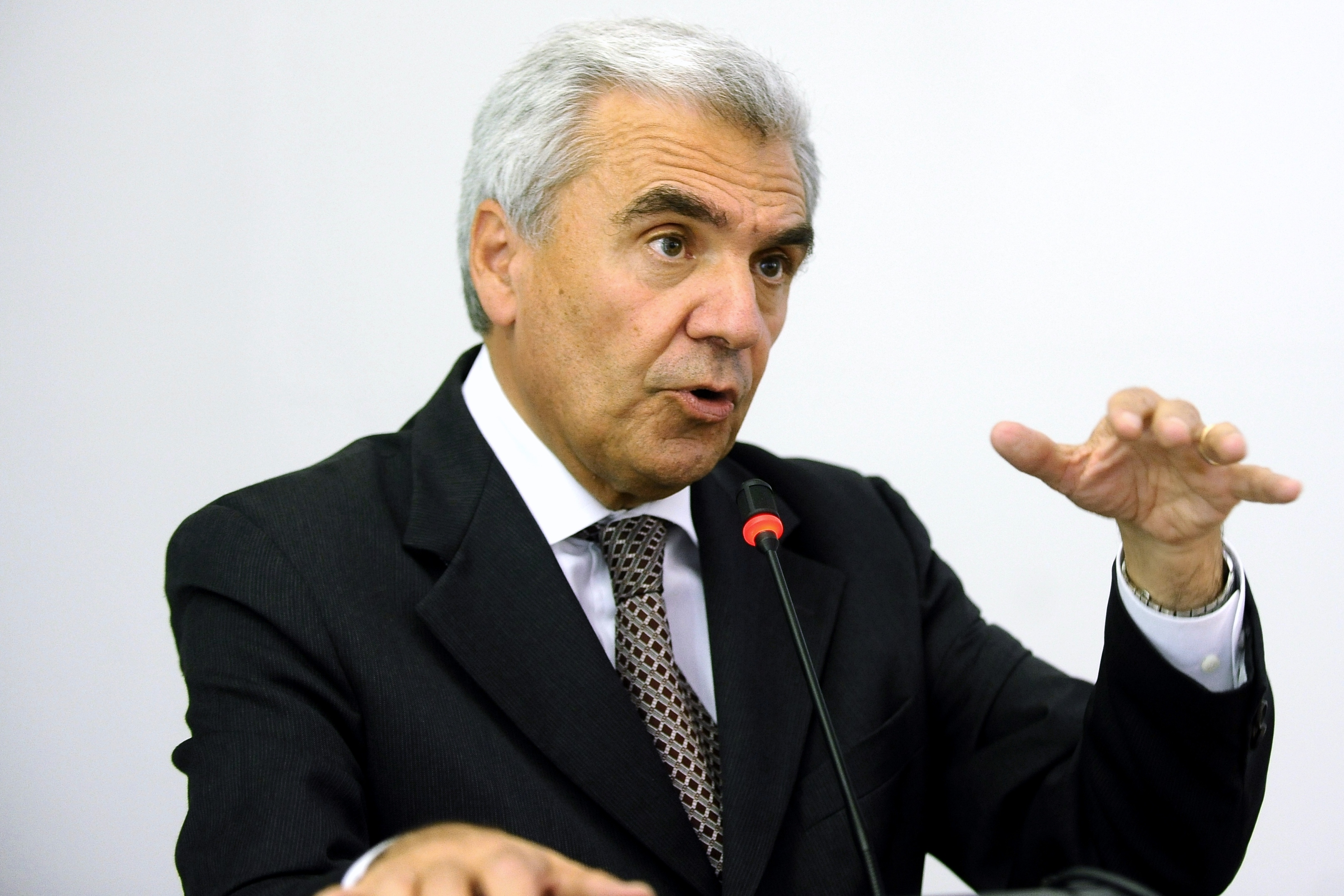
Renato Balduzzi, Minister of Health of Italy from 2011 to 2013

- Chedly Ayari – Minister of Equipment, Housing and Spatial Planning of Tunisia: 1969–1970/1974–1975; Minister of Youth and Sports of Tunisia: Jun–Nov 1970; Minister of Education of Tunisia: 1970–1971; Minister of Economy of Tunisia: 1972–1974; President of the Central Bank of Tunisia: 2012–2018
- Renato Balduzzi – Minister of Health of Italy: 2011–2013; Member of the Chamber of Deputies of Italy: 2013–2014; Member of the High Council of the Judiciary of Italy: 2014–2018
- Daniel Barbu – Minister of Culture of Romania: 2012–2013; Member of the Senate of Romania: 2012–2017
- Boudewijn Bouckaert – Member of the Flemish Parliament: 2009–2014
- Sadok Chaabane – Minister of Justice of Tunisia: 1992–1997; Minister of Higher Education and Scientific Research of Tunisia: 1999–2004
- Tullio De Mauro – Minister of Education of Italy: 2000–2001
- Francis Delpérée – Member of the Senate of Belgium: 2007–2014; Member of the Chamber of Representatives of Belgium: 2014–2019
- Sven Koopmans – Member of the House of Representatives of the Netherlands: 2017–2021; European Union Special Representative (EUSR) for the Middle East Peace Process: 2021–2025
- Nikolaos Politis – Minister of Foreign Affairs of Greece: 1917–1920
- Kenneth F. Simpson – Republican member of the United States House of Representatives: Jan 1941
- Michel van den Abeele – Director-General of Eurostat: 2003–2004; Ambassador of the EU to the OECD and UNESCO: 2004–2007

==== French politicians ====
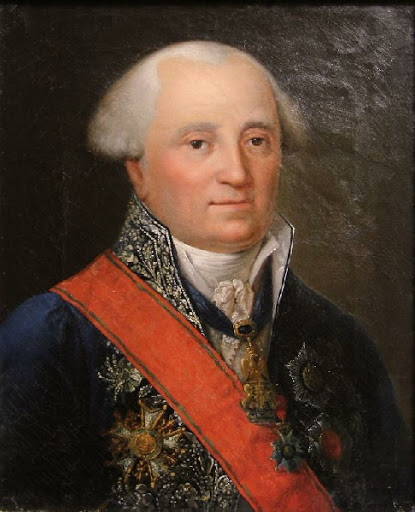
Joseph Jérôme Siméon, President of the National Assembly of France from Aug to Sep 1797 and Minister of the Interior of France from 1820 to 1821

- Joseph Barthélemy – Minister of Justice of France: 1941–1943
- Hippolyte Fortoul – Minister of the Navy and Colonies of France: Oct–Dec 1851; Minister of National Education of France/Minister of Public Worship of France: 1851–1856
- Gaspard Goyrand – Deputy Mayor of Aix-en-Provence: 1838–1848
- Hubert Haenel – French politician, member of the Constitutional Council of France: 2010–2015
- Didier Maus – Councillor of State of France: 2001–2011
- Jean-Paul Proust – Minister of State of Monaco: 2005–2010; Prefect of Police of Paris: 2001–2004
- Joseph Jérôme Siméon – President of the National Assembly of France: Aug–Sep 1797; Minister of National Education of France: Feb–Oct 1820; Minister of the Interior of France: 1820–1821; President of the Court of Financial Auditors of France: 1837–1839
- Michel Tonon – Mayor of Salon-de-Provence: 2002–2014
- Jean-Jacques Weiss – Councillor of State of France: 1873–1879

==== Members of the National Assembly of France ====
- Gilbert Baumet – Deputy: 1993–1997; Senator: 1980–1992
- René Brunet – Deputy: 1928–1942
- Joseph Comiti – Deputy: 1968–1981
- Paul de Fougères de Villandry – Deputy: 1837–1839
- Jean-Pierre Giran – Deputy: 1997–2002/2002–2007/2007–2012/2012–2017
- François-Michel Lambert – Deputy: 2012–2022
- Rémy Montagne – Deputy: 1958–1968/1973–1980
- Ambroise Mottet – Deputy: 1835–1842/1844–1848; Mayor of Aix-en-Provence: 1830–1831
- Paul Patriarche – Deputy: 1997–2002
- Camille Perreau – Deputy: 1898–1902
- Philippe Sanmarco – Deputy: 1981–1993
- Henri-Emmanuel Poulle – Deputy: 1831–1834/1834–1837/1837–1839/1839–1842/1842–1846/1846–1848
- Dominique Taddéi – Deputy: 1978–1981/1981–1985
- Maurice Toga – Deputy: 1986–1988

==== Members of the Senate of France ====
- Alain Delcamp – Secretary-General: 2005–2013
- Brigitte Devésa – Senator: 2021–present
- Claude Domeizel – Senator: 1998–2014
- Michèle Einaudi – Senator: Aug–Sep 2020
- Hélène Masson-Maret – Senator: 2013–2014

=== Diplomatic service ===
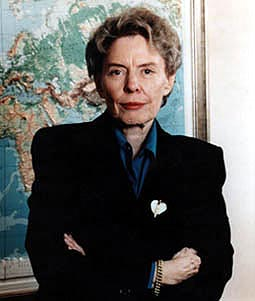
Jeane Kirkpatrick, United States Ambassador to the United Nations from 1981 to 1985

- Bajrakitiyabha, Princess Rajasarini Siribajra – Thai Ambassador to Austria, Slovakia and Slovenia, with residence in Vienna, Austria: 2012–2014
- Jeane Kirkpatrick – United States Ambassador to the United Nations: 1981–1985
- Lucien-Anatole Prévost-Paradol – French Ambassador to the United States: 1870

=== Lawyers, judges, and legal academics ===
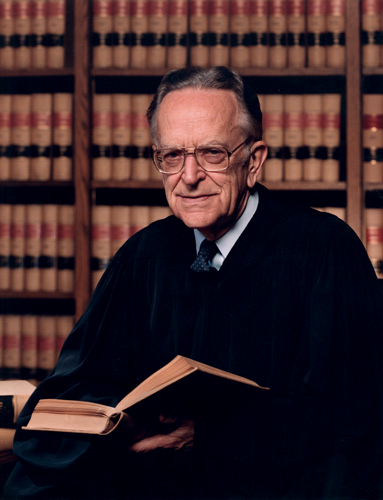
Harry Blackmun, Associate Justice of the Supreme Court of the United States from 1970 to 1994

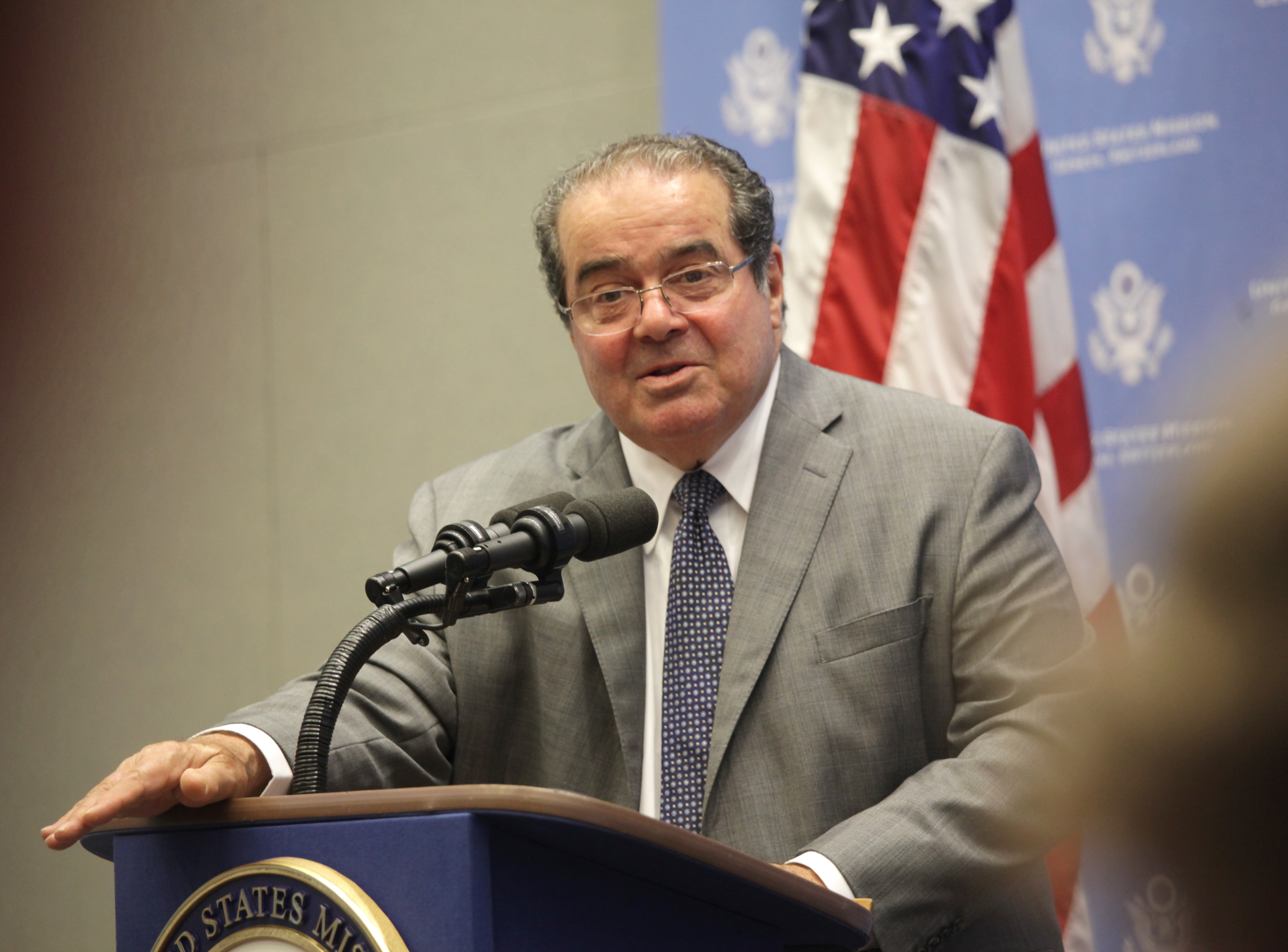
Antonin Scalia, Associate Justice of the Supreme Court of the United States from 1986 to 2016

- Sami A. Aldeeb – Head of the Arab and Islamic Law Department at the Swiss Institute of Comparative Law, and Director of the Center of Arab and Islamic Law
- Harry Blackmun – Associate Justice of the Supreme Court of the United States: 1970–1994
- Leonardo Nemer Caldeira Brant – Judge of the International Court of Justice (ICJ): 2022–present
- Jay Bybee – Senior Judge of the United States Court of Appeals for the Ninth Circuit: 2019–present
- Mirjan Damaška – Sterling Professor emeritus at Yale Law School
- René David – former Chair of Comparative Law at the University of Paris, Sorbonne
- Louis Favoreu – French academic and jurist
- Barry E. Friedman – American academic with an expertise in federal courts, working at the intersections of law, politics and history
- Giorgio Gaja – Judge of the International Court of Justice (ICJ): 2011–2021
- Alon Harel – Phillip P. Mizock & Estelle Mizock Chair in Administrative and Criminal Law at the Hebrew University of Jerusalem
- Geoffrey C. Hazard, Jr. – Trustee Professor of Law at the University of Pennsylvania Law School, the Thomas E. Miller Distinguished Professor of Law at the University of California, Hastings College of the Law, and Sterling Professor Emeritus of Law at Yale Law School
- Ayşe Işıl Karakaş – Turkish academic, judge of the European Court of Human Rights (ECtHR)
- Peter Lindseth – Olimpiad S. Ioffe Professor of International and Comparative Law and the Director of International Programs at the University of Connecticut School of Law
- Ejan Mackaay – Professor of Law at the Université de Montréal
- John F. Murphy – American lawyer and a professor at Villanova University
- John L. Murray – Chief Justice of Ireland: 2004–2011; Judge of the Supreme Court of Ireland: 1999–2015; Judge of the European Court of Justice (ECJ): 1992–1999; Attorney General of Ireland: 1982/1987–1991
- Theo Öhlinger – Member of the Constitutional Court of Austria: 1977–1989
- Francesco Parisi – Oppenheimer Wolff & Donnelly Professor of Law at the University of Minnesota Law School
- Raymond Ranjeva – Judge of the International Court of Justice (ICJ): 1991–2009; Vice-President of the International Court of Justice (ICJ): 2003–2006
- Hjalte Rasmussen – former professor of EU Law at the University of Copenhagen
- Michel Rosenfeld – Justice Sydney L. Robins Professor of Human Rights, Benjamin N. Cardozo School of Law, Yeshiva University
- Francisco Rubio Llorente – Judge of the Constitutional Court of Spain: 1980–1992; Vice President of the Constitutional Court of Spain: 1989–1992; President of the Spanish Council of State: 2004–2012
- Eli Salzberger – Law Professor at the University of Haifa Faculty of Law
- Antonin Scalia – Associate Justice of the United States Supreme Court: 1986–2016
- Bernhard Schlink – German jurist and writer
- Ronald Sokol – American lawyer and writer
- Alec Stone Sweet – Leitner Professor of Law, Politics and International Studies at Yale Law School
- Symeon C. Symeonides – Dean of the Willamette University College of Law
- Stefan Talmon – professor of international law at the University of Bonn, supernumerary fellow of St Anne's College, Oxford
- Michael Tigar – American criminal defense attorney
- Hélène Tigroudja – Member of the United Nations Human Rights Committee: 2019–present

=== Arts, literature, humanities, and entertainment ===
==== Historians ====
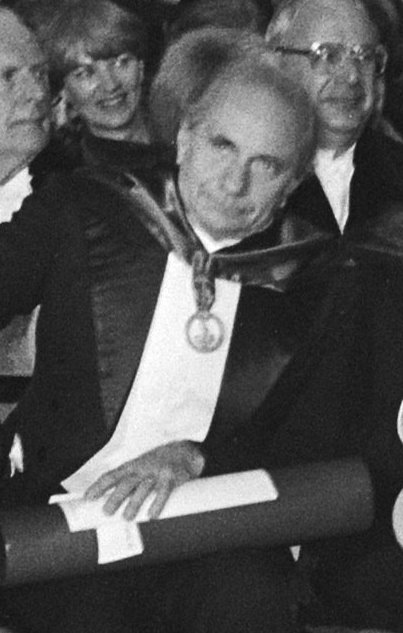
Georges Duby, French historian, member of the French Academy from 1987 to 1996 and the Academy of Inscriptions and Belles-Lettres from 1974 to 1996

- François Victor Alphonse Aulard – professor of the history of the French Revolution at the University of Paris, Sorbonne
- Gabriel Camps – French historian, former member of the Academy of Overseas Sciences and Academy of Inscriptions and Belles-Lettres
- Georges Duby – French historian, former member of the French Academy and Academy of Inscriptions and Belles-Lettres
- Georges Foucart – French historian and Egyptologist, former member of the Academy of Overseas Sciences
- Derek Hopwood – British historian and Arabist, former Emeritus Fellow of St Antony's College, Oxford, and former Director at the Middle East Centre at the University of Oxford
- Douglas Johnson – British historian, an advisor to the former British Prime Minister Margaret Thatcher on all matters concerning France, Professor of French History at University College London (UCL): 1968–1990
- Charles Joret – French literary historian, philologist and botanical author, former member of the Academy of Inscriptions and Belles-Lettres, the Société de l'histoire de France, and the Académie des sciences, belles-lettres et arts de Rouen
- Nora Lafi – French historian, co-founder and editor of H-Mediterranean, H-Net, Michigan State University (MSU)
- Paolo Malanima – Italian economic historian
- George E. Mowry – American historian focusing primarily on the Progressive Era, professor at UCLA and the University of North Carolina at Chapel Hill
- Jean-Rémy Palanque – professor of ancient history, member of the Académie des Inscriptions et Belles-Lettres
- Serge Ricard – professor of American Civilization at the Sorbonne Nouvelle University
- Théodore Eugène César Ruyssen – French historian, former President of the Peace Through Law Association
- Rafał Taubenschlag – Polish historian of law, specialist in Roman law and papyrology, former member of the Polish Academy of Arts and Sciences
- Paul Veyne – French historian and archaeologist, former member of the École française de Rome and honorary professor at the Collège de France
- Catherine Virlouvet – French historian, professor of economic and social history of ancient Rome, former Director of the École française de Rome, member of the Academy of Inscriptions and Belles-Lettres and the Academia Europaea
- Arundhati Virmani – Indian historian, lecturer at the School for Advanced Studies in the Social Sciences (EHESS)
- Jules Sylvain Zeller – French historian, lecturer at the University of Paris, Sorbonne, member of the Académie des Sciences Morales et Politiques

==== Literature ====
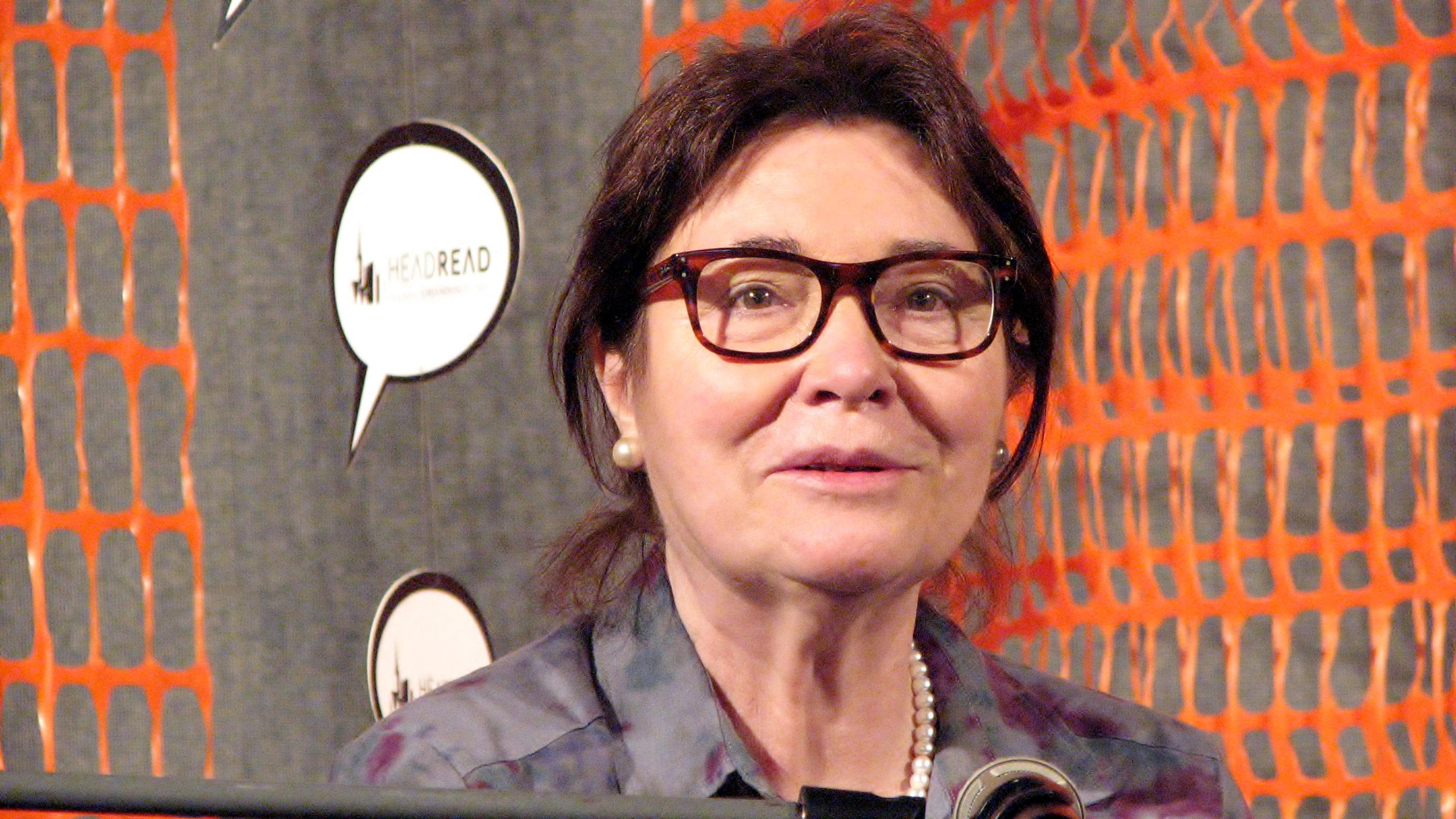
Paule Constant, French writer, winner of the 1998 Prix Goncourt

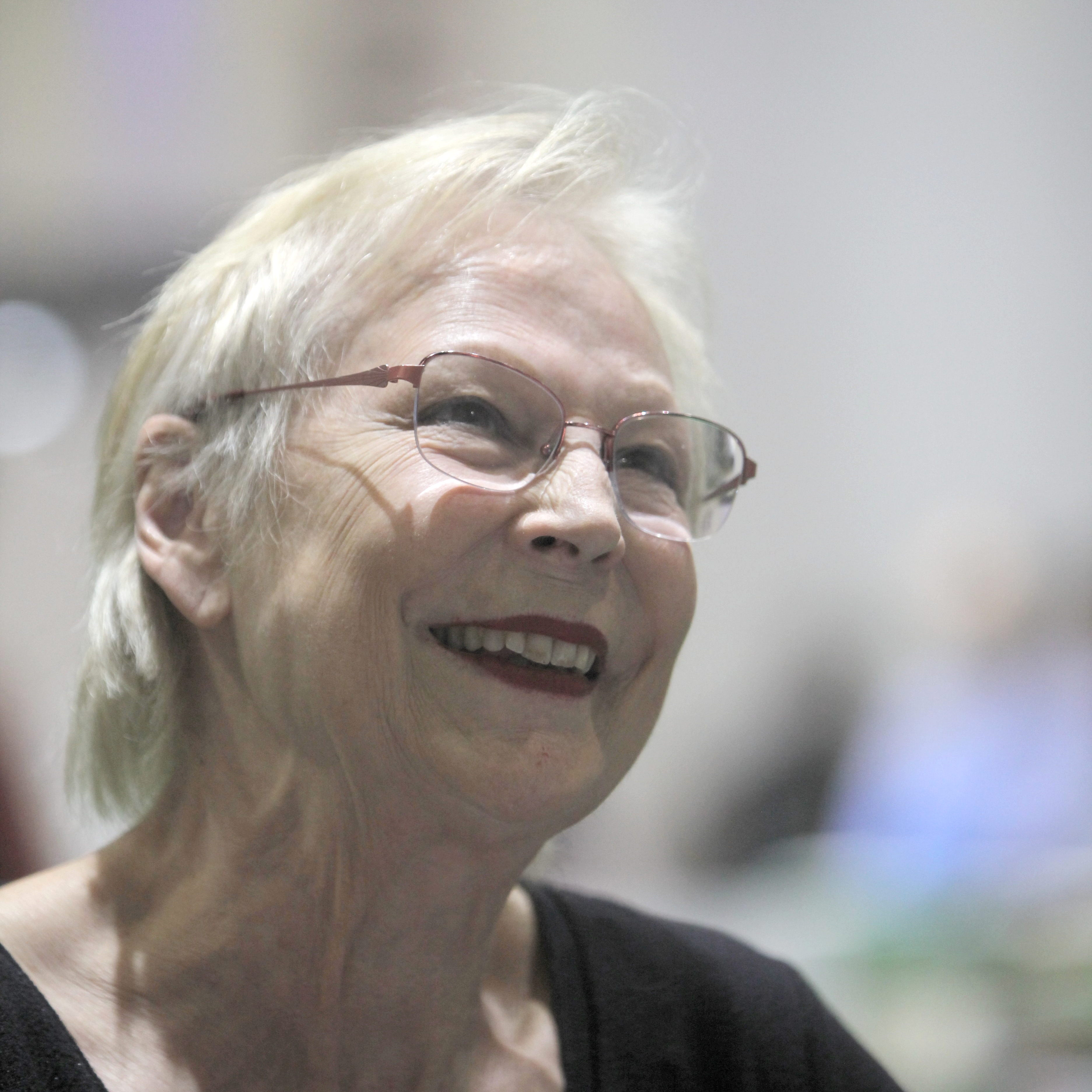
Lydie Salvayre, French writer, winner of the 2014 Prix Goncourt

- Yves Bonnefoy – French poet and essayist, former member of the American Academy of Arts and Sciences and the Bavarian Academy of Fine Arts
- Paule Constant – French novelist, winner of the 1998 Prix Goncourt
- Louis O. Coxe – American poet, playwright, essayist, and professor
- Frieda Ekotto – Francophone African novelist and literary critic, professor of Afro-American and African Studies and Comparative Literature at the University of Michigan
- Henri Fluchère – chairman of the Société Française Shakespeare and a literary critic
- Raymond Jean – French writer, winner of the 1983 Prix Goncourt de la Nouvelle
- Mazarine Pingeot – French writer, journalist and professor, the daughter of former President of France, François Mitterrand
- François Ricard – Canadian writer, professor of French literature at McGill University
- Émile Ripert – French academic, poet, novelist and playwright
- Urbano Tavares Rodrigues – Portuguese professor of literature, a literary critic and a fiction writer
- Lydie Salvayre – French writer, winner of the 2014 Prix Goncourt
- Affonso Romano de Sant'Anna – Brazilian poet, essayist, and professor
- Roselyne Sibille – French poet
- William E. Wilson – American writer

==== Music ====
- André Bon – French composer
- André Boucourechliev – French composer
- Barry Conyngham – Australian composer and academic
- Jean-Claude Risset – French composer

=== Scientists ===
==== Social Science ====
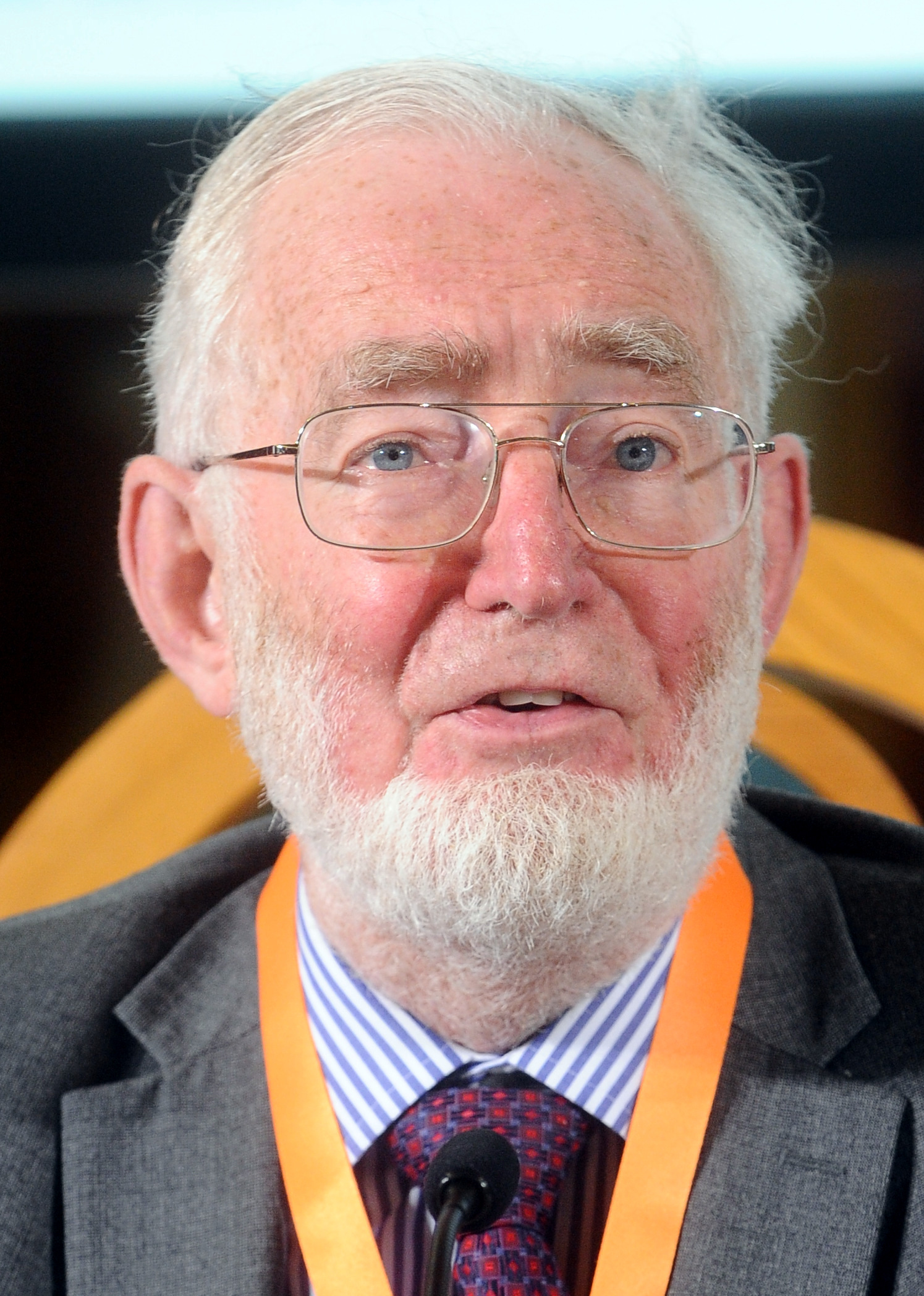
Tony Atkinson, Fellow of the British Academy from 1984 to 2017, Fellow of St John's College, Cambridge from 1967 to 1971, and Warden of Nuffield College, Oxford from 1994 to 2006

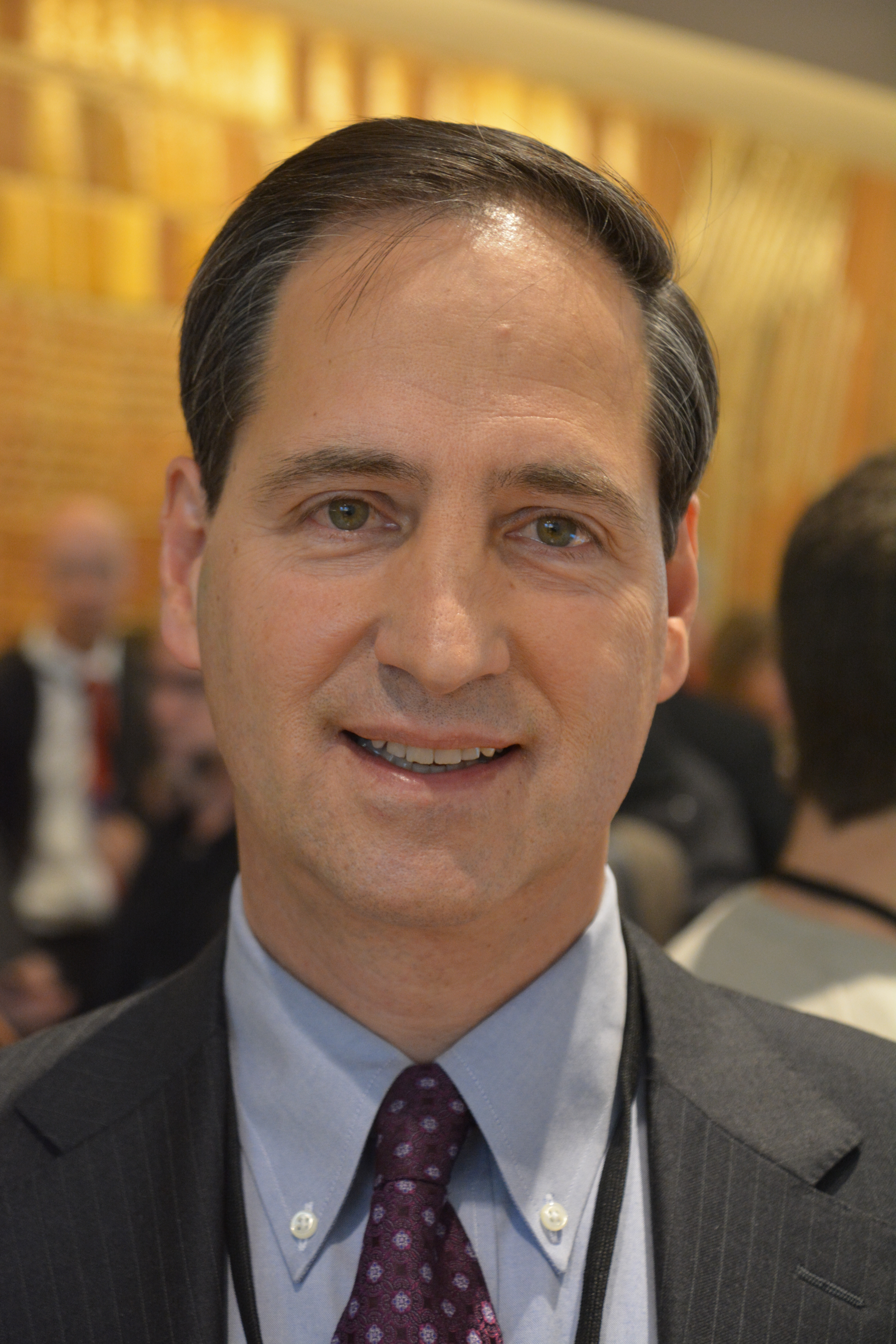
David E. Bloom, Chair of the Department of Global Health and Population at Harvard University from 2001 to 2011, and Chair of the Department of Economics at Columbia University from 1990 to 1993

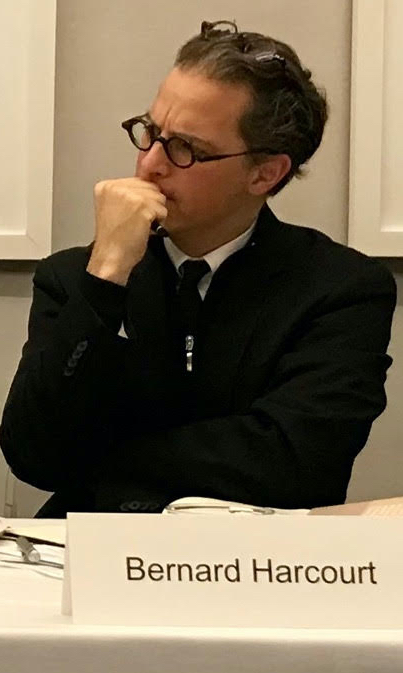
Bernard Harcourt, current Director of the Columbia Center for Contemporary Critical Thought at Columbia University, and Chairman of the Political Science Department at the University of Chicago from 2010 to 2014

- Jean-Claude Abric – professor in social psychology
- Giulio Angioni – Italian writer and anthropologist, professor at the University of Cagliari, fellow of St Antony's College of the University of Oxford
- Tony Atkinson – former Fellow of the British Academy, a senior research fellow of Nuffield College of the University of Oxford and Centennial Professor at the London School of Economics (LSE)
- Sydney Hervé Aufrère – French Egyptologist, archaeologist, and director of research at CNRS
- Patrick Baert – Belgian sociologist and social theorist, reader in Social Theory at the University of Cambridge and Fellow of Selwyn College, Cambridge
- Eugène Benoist – French classical philologist, member of the Académie des Inscriptions et Belles-Lettres
- Danielle Bleitrach – French sociologist
- Maurice Blondel – French philosopher
- David E. Bloom – former Chair of Harvard University's Department of Global Health and Population, professor of Economics and Demography at the Harvard School of Public Health, and Director of the Program on the Global Demography of Aging
- François Burgat – French political scientist and arabist, senior research fellow at the French National Centre for Scientific Research (CNRS), and the Head of the French Institute of the Near East (IFPO)
- Forrest Capie – professor emeritus of Economic History at the Cass Business School, City University London
- Brian Lee Crowley – Managing Director of the Macdonald-Laurier Institute, and the founding President of the Atlantic Institute for Market Studies (AIMS)
- Christie Davies – British sociologist, professor emeritus of sociology at the University of Reading
- Rajeev Dehejia – professor of public policy in the Robert F. Wagner Graduate School of Public Service at New York University
- Roger Establet – French scholar of the sociology of education
- Jean-Yves Girard – French logician
- Louis Godart – Chair of Philology at the University of Naples Federico II, Advisor on Artistic Heritage Conservation to the President of Italy
- Lucien Golvin – French university professor who specialized in the study of art from the peoples of the Maghreb
- Gérard Granel – French philosopher and translator
- Gilles-Gaston Granger – French analytic philosopher, former member of the Academia Europaea
- Pierre Gros – contemporary scholar of ancient Roman architecture and the Latin language
- Maurice Gross – French linguist and scholar of Romance languages, former professor at Paris 8 University and Paris Diderot University, and former member of the Academia Europaea
- Gene Grossman – Jacob Viner Professor of International Economics at Princeton University
- Bernard Harcourt – Director of the Columbia Center for Contemporary Critical Thought at Columbia University, Director of Studies at the École des Hautes Études en Sciences Sociales, and former Chair of the Political Science Department, professor of political science and the Julius Kreeger Professor of Law at the University of Chicago
- Józef Maria Hoene-Wroński – Polish philosopher
- Jean-Louis Le Moigne – French specialist on systems theory and constructivist epistemology
- Leigh Lisker – American linguist and phonetician
- Carlo Lottieri – Political Philosophy professor
- John Loughlin – Director of the Von Hügel Institute, and a senior fellow and affiliated lecturer in the Department of Politics and International Studies at the University of Cambridge
- Octave Merlier – expert on the Modern Greek language
- Georges Mounin – French linguist, translator and semiotician
- Gunasekaran Paramasamy – Vice-Chancellor of Thiruvalluvar University
- Jules Payot – French educationist
- Charles Rostaing – French linguist specialising in toponymy
- Mark Seidenberg – Hilldale and Donald O. Hebb Professor of Psychology at the University of Wisconsin–Madison and a senior scientist at Haskins Laboratories
- Samah Selim – Egyptian scholar and translator of Arabic literature
- Bernard Sellato – former Director of the Institute for Research on Southeast Asia
- Étienne Souriau – French philosopher, member of the Académie des Sciences Morales et Politiques
- Paul Souriau – French philosopher
- William H. Starbuck – organizational scientist who held professorships in social relations (Johns Hopkins University), sociology (Cornell University), business administration (University of Wisconsin–Milwaukee), and management (New York University)
- Nikola Stoyanov – Bulgarian scientist, economist and financier
- Eero Tarasti – Finnish musicologist and semiologist
- John Waterbury – American academic, professor of politics and international affairs at Princeton University's Woodrow Wilson School of Public and International Affairs
- Jean Varenne – French Indologist
- Andrey Zaliznyak – Russian linguist, former corresponding member of the Academy of Sciences of the Soviet Union, former full academician of the Russian Academy of Sciences, and former member of the Göttingen Academy of Sciences and Humanities
- Christoph Zürcher – professor at the graduate school of public and international affairs at the University of Ottawa, former professor of political science at the Free University of Berlin, and former Humboldt Fellow at the Center on Democracy, Development and the Rule of Law at Stanford University

==== Medical science ====
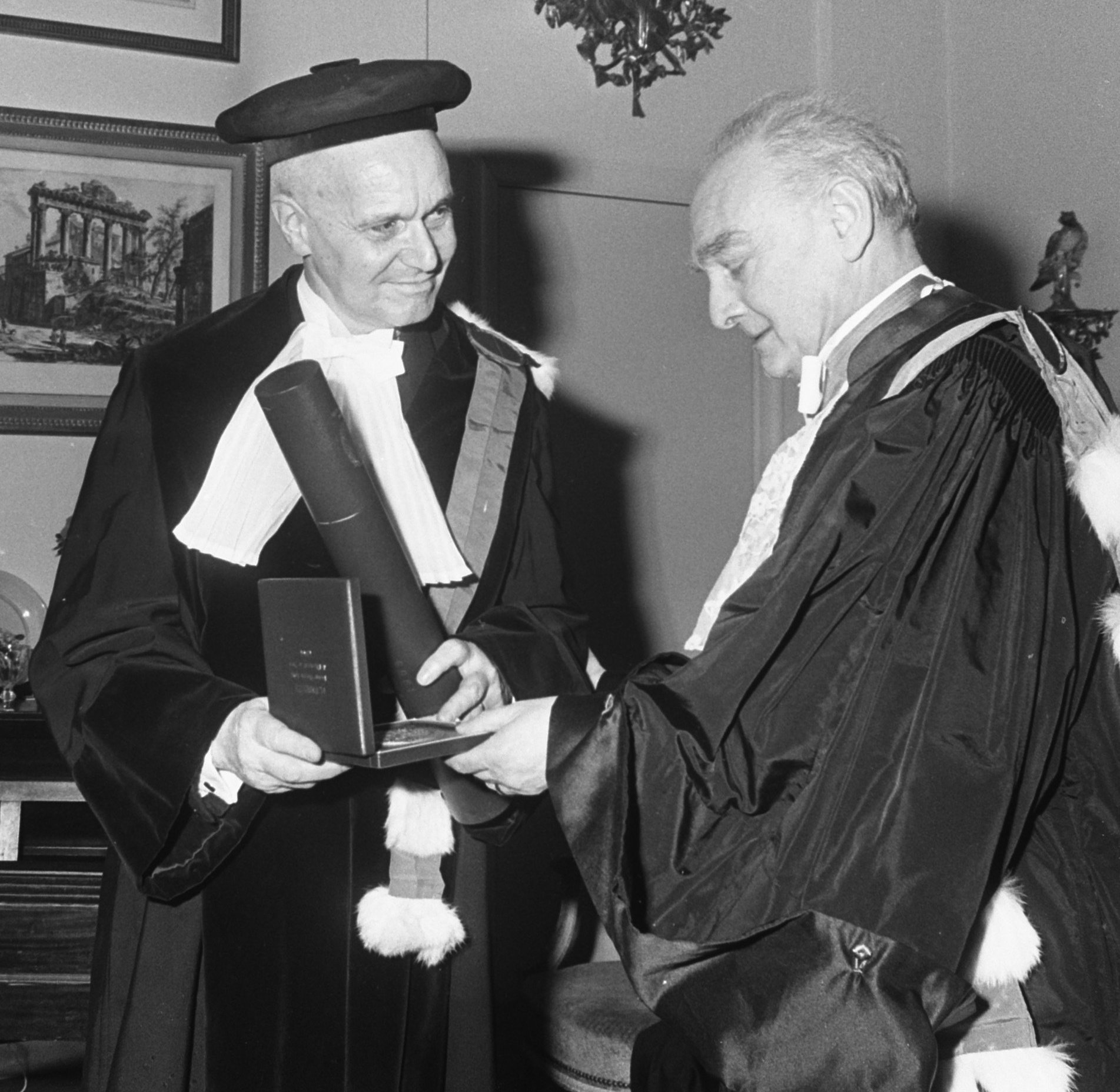
Jean Roche (right), Rector of the Sorbonne from 1961 to 1969, member of the French Academy of Medicine from 1954 to 1992 and the French Academy of Sciences from 1963 to 1992

- Nicolas Maurice Arthus – French immunologist and physiologist, former member of the Royal Academy of Medicine of Belgium, for whom the Arthus reaction is named
- Marius Audier – French physician, cardiologist, and polymath, founder of the Institut de Gérontologie Sociale
- Philip Augustine – Indian gastroenterologist, specialist in gastrointestinal endoscopy
- Svetlana Broz – Bosnian–Serbian author and physician, the granddaughter of the 1st President of Yugoslavia, Josip Broz Tito
- Boris Cyrulnik – French doctor, ethologist, neurologist and psychiatrist
- Jacques Daviel – French ophthalmologist, oculist to Louis XV, Fellow of the Royal Society, and a foreign member of the Royal Swedish Academy of Sciences
- Édouard Marie Heckel – French botanist and medical doctor, former director of the Jardin botanique E.M. Heckel, and founder of the Colonial Institute and Museum of Marseille
- Antoine Mérindol – French physician, doctor to Louis XIII
- Jean Roche – French physician, former member of the French Academy of Medicine and the French Academy of Sciences, and former Rector of the University of Paris, Sorbonne

==== Physical science ====
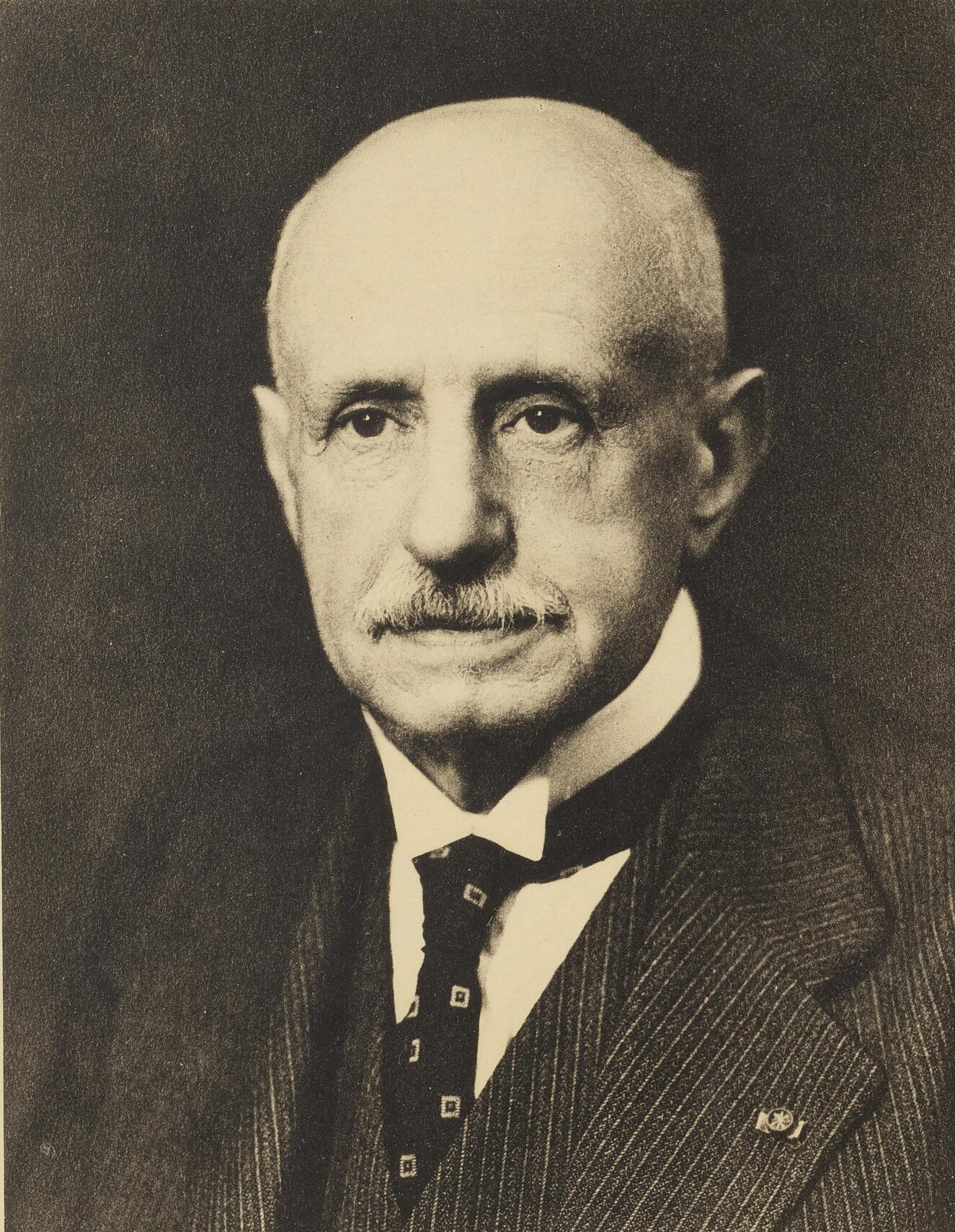
Maurice Caullery, French biologist, former President of the French Academy of Sciences, member of the British Royal Society and the American Academy of Arts and Sciences

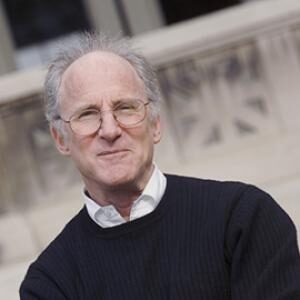
John F. Forester, Chair of the Department of City and Regional Planning at Cornell University from 1998 to 2001

Jose L. Torero, current Head of the Department of Civil, Environmental and Geomatic Engineering at University College London (UCL)

- Henri Bacry – visiting scholar at the Institute for Advanced Study and a researcher at CERN
- René Baillaud – French astronomer, former corresponding member of the French Academy of Sciences
- Ugo Bardi – professor in physical chemistry at the University of Florence
- Reinhold Bertlmann – Austrian physicist, professor of physics at the University of Vienna
- Eugenio Bianchi – Italian theoretical physicist
- Jean Bosler – French astronomer, member of the French Academy of Sciences
- Henri Buisson – French physicist, co-discoverer of the ozone layer, member of the French Academy of Sciences
- Jean Cabannes – French physicist, former member of the French Academy of Sciences, former President of the Société astronomique de France and the Bureau des Longitudes
- Christian Cambillau – French scientist at the CNRS in Structural Biology
- Carlo Carraro – President of the University of Venice, Director of the Sustainable Development Program of the Fondazione Eni Enrico Mattei, and Director of the Climate Impacts and Policy Division of the Euro-Mediterranean Center for Climate Change (CMCC)
- Maurice Caullery – President of the French Academy of Sciences: Jan–Dec 1945
- Jean Chacornac – French astronomer, the asteroid 1622 Chacornac and the lunar crater Chacornac are named in his honour
- Jérôme Eugène Coggia – French astronomer, two-time recipient of the Lalande Prize
- Alain Colmerauer – French computer scientist and creator of the logic programming language Prolog, former member of the French Academy of Sciences and the Institut Universitaire de France
- Henri Coquand – French geologist and paleontologist
- Pablo Cottenot – French astronomer
- Charles Depéret – French geologist and paleontologist, member of the French Academy of Sciences and the Société géologique de France
- August Alphonse Derbès – French naturalist, zoologist and botanist
- Jean Dufay – French astronomer, member of the French Academy of Sciences
- Jean-Yves Empereur – French archeologist and egyptologist, member of the Academy of Inscriptions and Belles-Lettres
- Honoré Fabri – French Jesuit theologian, mathematician, physicist and controversialist
- Charles Fehrenbach – French astronomer, member of the French Academy of Sciences, and Director of the Haute-Provence Observatory (OHP)
- John F. Forester – American planning theorist with a particular emphasis on participatory planning, former Chair of the Department of City and Regional Planning at Cornell University
- Jean-Félix Adolphe Gambart – French astronomer, former member of the French Academy of Sciences
- Alex Grossmann – Croatian-French physicist, former member of the Academia Europaea
- Rudolf Haag – German theoretical physicist, member of the German National Academy of Sciences Leopoldina, the Göttingen Academy of Sciences, and corresponding member of the Bavarian Academy of Sciences and the Austrian Academy of Sciences
- Isao Imai – Japanese theoretical physicist, former member of the Institute of Space and Astronautical Science (ISAS), the University of Tokyo
- Henri Lucien Jumelle – French botanist, former member of the Académie des sciences d'outre-mer
- Daniel Kastler – French theoretical physicist, former corresponding member of the Göttingen Academy of Sciences, the Austrian Academy of Sciences, and the German National Academy of Sciences Leopoldina
- Joseph J. Katz – American chemist at Argonne National Laboratory, member of the US National Academy of Sciences
- Antoine Émile Henry Labeyrie – French astronomer, former member of the Academia Europaea, the French Academy of Sciences, and the International Astronomical Union
- Deepak Lal – James S. Coleman Professor of International Development Studies at the University of California, Los Angeles (UCLA)
- Antonio Lanzavecchia – Italian immunologist
- Lucien Laubier – French oceanographer, former Director of the Institut océanographique de Paris, and former member of the French Academy of Sciences, the French Academy of Technologies, and the Académie de Marine
- Laurie Menviel - Australian climate scientist & oceanographer
- Henry de Lumley – French archeologist, geologist and prehistorian
- John L. Lumley – professor emeritus, Graduate Professor of Mechanical Engineering and Aerospace Engineering at Cornell University
- Roger Malina – physicist, astronomer, Executive Editor of Leonardo Publications at the MIT Press
- Antoine Fortuné Marion – French naturalist, former corresponding member of the Société de Géographie
- Marcin Odlanicki Poczobutt – Polish–Lithuanian Jesuit astronomer and mathematician, former Rector of Vilnius University
- Jean-Louis Pons – French astronomer
- Didier Raoult – French biology researcher
- Carlo Rovelli – Italian physicist, member of the Institut Universitaire de France
- Evry Schatzman – French astrophysicist, former member of the Academia Europaea, the French Academy of Sciences, and the Société Française d'Astronomie et d'Astrophysique
- Édouard Stephan – French astronomer, former member of the French Academy of Sciences
- Wilhelm Tempel – German astronomer, former member of the Royal Society and the Accademia dei Lincei
- Jose L. Torero – former BRE Trust/Royal Academy of Engineering Chair in Fire Safety Engineering, former Director of the BRE Centre for Fire Safety Engineering at University of Edinburgh, and current Head of the Department of Civil, Environmental and Geomatic Engineering at University College London (UCL)
- Nicolas Tournadre – professor specializing in morphosyntax and typology, member of the LACITO lab of the CNRS
- Benjamin Valz – French astronomer, former member of the French Academy of Sciences
- Albert Jean Baptiste Marie Vayssière – French scientist
- Margaret Weitz – American academic, former professor emeritus at Suffolk University
- Dan Werthimer – co-founder and chief scientist of the SETI@home project, Chief Scientist of the Berkeley SETI Research Center at the University of California, Berkeley
- Francisco José Ynduráin – Spanish theoretical physicist, former member of the Spanish Royal Physics Society, the Royal Academy of Exact, Physical and Natural Sciences, the American Physical Society, the Academia Europaea, and the European Physical Society

=== Business and economics ===
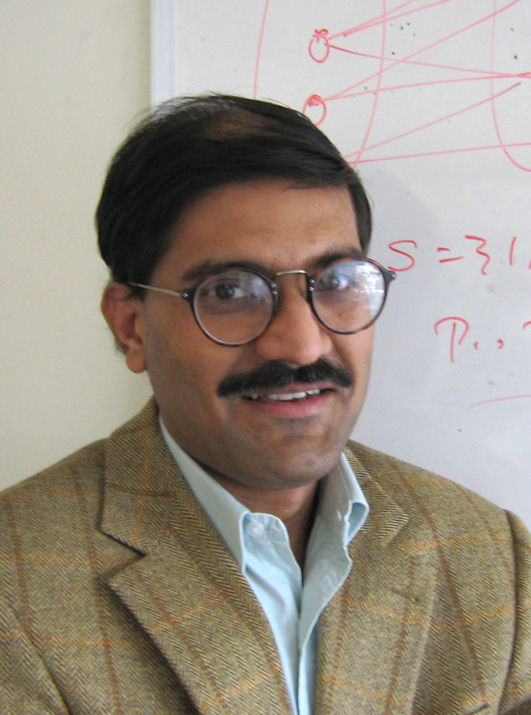
Sanjeev Goyal, Fellow of the British Academy and Chair of the Faculty of Economics at the University of Cambridge from 2014 to 2018

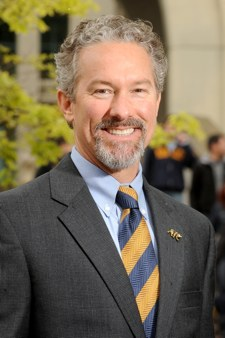
Rich Lyons, 12th and current Chancellor of UC Berkeley, and Dean of the Haas School of Business, UC Berkeley from 2008 to 2018

- Georges Anderla – French economist, former professor at the Paris Institute of Political Studies (Sciences Po) and the University of Paris, Sorbonne
- Bruce Caldwell – Research Professor of Economics at Duke University, and Director of the Center for the History of Political Economy
- Jean-Pierre Danthine – Swiss-Belgian economist, Vice President of the Swiss National Bank (SNB): 2012–2015
- Lars Feld – Director of the Walter Eucken Institut, professor for Economic Policy at the University of Freiburg, and member of the German Council of Economic Experts
- Garance Genicot – Belgian-American economist, associate professor of economics at Georgetown University
- Rick Gilmore – President/CEO of GIC Trade, Inc. (the GIC Group), Special external advisor to the White House/USAID for the private sector/global food security and managing director of the Global Food Safety Forum (GFSF) in Beijing
- Victor Ginsburgh – Belgian economist
- Sanjeev Goyal – Indian economist, professor of economics at the University of Cambridge and Fellow of Christ's College, Cambridge
- Nancy Hubbard – American professor of business, author, and Miriam Katowitz Chair of Management and Accounting at Goucher College
- Rich Lyons – Dean of the Haas School of Business, University of California, Berkeley: 2008–2018; Chancellor of the University of California, Berkeley: 2024–present
- Angus Maddison – British economist, former Fellow of Selwyn College, Cambridge, and former emeritus professor at the Faculty of Economics at the University of Groningen
- Gérard Mestrallet – Chairman and CEO of Engie: 2008–2016
- Henry Mintzberg – academic and author on business and management, the Cleghorn Professor of Management Studies at the Desautels Faculty of Management of McGill University
- Abhiroop Mukhopadhyay – Indian economist
- Nikolay Nenovsky – Bulgarian economist, member of the Governing Council of the Bulgarian National Bank
- Pierre Pestieau – Belgian economist, former lecturer at Cornell University, and former professor of economics at the University of Liège
- George Selgin – Director of the Cato Institute's Center for Monetary and Financial Alternatives, professor emeritus of economics at the Terry College of Business at the University of Georgia, and an associate editor of Econ Journal Watch
- Mark P. Taylor – Dean of Warwick Business School (WBS) at the University of Warwick and an academic in the fields of International Finance and Economics
- Paul Tiffany – Senior Lecturer at the Haas School of Business, University of California, Berkeley
- Lawrence H. White – American economics professor at George Mason University
- Myrna Wooders – Canadian economist, Fellow of the Econometric Society, professor of economics at Vanderbilt University and the University of Warwick

=== Mathematics ===
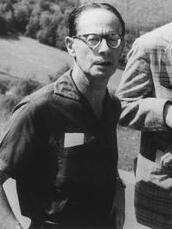
André Weil, French mathematician, former member of the French Academy of Sciences and the British Royal Society, and co-founder of the Bourbaki group

- Sergio Albeverio – Swiss mathematician working in the field of differential equations and mathematical physics
- Peter Balazs – Austrian mathematician working at the Acoustics Research Institute Vienna of the Austrian Academy of Sciences
- Yvonne Choquet-Bruhat – French mathematician and physicist, who was the first woman to be elected to the French Academy of Sciences
- Joachim Cuntz – German mathematician, fellow of the American Mathematical Society
- Roland Fraïssé – French mathematical logician
- John H. Hubbard – American mathematician, professor at Cornell University
- Henri Padé – French mathematician, known for his development of approximation techniques for functions using rational functions
- Étienne Pardoux – French mathematician working in the field of Stochastic analysis, in particular Stochastic partial differential equations
- Olivier Ramaré – French mathematician
- Nicolas Sarrabat – French mathematician and scientist, the son of the painter Daniel Sarrabat
- Jean-Marie Souriau – French mathematician, known for works in symplectic geometry
- Masamichi Takesaki – Japanese mathematician, professor at the University of California, Los Angeles (UCLA) and fellow of the American Mathematical Society
- David Trotman – British mathematician, leading expert in an area of singularity theory known as the theory of stratifications
- André Weil – French mathematician, member of the French Academy of Sciences and the British Royal Society, and co-founder of the Bourbaki group, known for his foundational work in number theory and algebraic geometry

=== Miscellaneous ===
- Robert Chaudenson – French linguist, a specialist in creole languages
- Jean-François Delmas – French librarian, chief curator of the Bibliothèque Inguimbertine and the Musées de Carpentras, member of the French Catholic Academy
- Michel Duc-Goninaz – member of the World Esperanto Youth Organization (TEJO), and co-editor of La Folieto
- Roger Duchêne – French biographer specializing in the letters of Madame de Sévigné, former member of the Société d'étude du XVIIe siècle
- Leonard Liggio – classical liberal author, research professor of law at George Mason University, and executive vice president of the Atlas Economic Research Foundation in Fairfax, Virginia
- Tuncer Őren – Turkish Canadian systems engineer, professor emeritus of Computer Science at the School of Electrical Engineering and Computer Science of the University of Ottawa
- Rascas de Bagarris – founder of the science of historical numismatics and one of the most notable antiquaries of his time
- Willy Ronis – French photographer, former member of Les 30 × 40 (Le Club photographique de Paris)

== See also ==
- List of early modern universities in Europe
- List of medieval universities
- List of oldest universities in continuous operation
