= List of named minor planets: D =

This is a partial list of named minor planets, containing all those starting with the letter D, as of 9 November 2026. It is ordered in a case-insensitive, alphabetical manner and contains a total of 1,240 entries. Grey minor planets have no article and redirect to the list of minor planets instead (see List of minor planets § Main index).

== D ==
- 5956 d'Alembert
- 33560 D'Alessandro
- 11574 d'Alviella
- 16049 D'Amore
- 8488 d'Argens
- 9133 d'Arrest
- 14238 d'Artagnan
- 14961 d'Auteroche
- 32387 D'Egidio
- 10523 D'Haveloose
- 11530 d'Indy
- 30272 D'Mello
- 27397 D'Souza
- 55720 Daandehoop
- 313921 Daassou
- 216023 DaBoll
- 16154 Dabramo
- 3611 Dabu
- 7217 Dacke
- 1864 Daedalus
- 11571 Daens
- 345959 Dafeng
- 18349 Dafydd
- 2297 Daghestan
- 1669 Dagmar
- 3256 Daguerre
- 13283 Dahart
- 16996 Dahir
- 6223 Dahl
- 6945 Dahlgren
- 16060 Dahliadry
- 13269 Dahlstrom
- 865364 Daianji
- 11161 Daibosatsu
- 52421 Daihoji
- 9225 Daiki
- 54288 Daikikawasaki
- 23888 Daikinoshita
- 23897 Daikuroda
- 227711 Dailyminorplanet
- 457303 Daina
- 308306 Dainere
- 34995 Dainihonshi
- 9758 Dainty
- 35370 Daisakyu
- 4839 Daisetsuzan
- 21014 Daishi
- 31152 Daishinsai
- 16826 Daisuke
- 19959 Daisy
- 8551 Daitarabochi
- 16560 Daitor
- 3405 Daiwensai
- 10423 Dajčić
- 20527 Dajowestrich
- 31400 Dakshdua
- 28936 Dalapati
- 148384 Dalcanton
- 333040 Dalehowell
- 20358 Dalem
- 1511 Daléra
- 128341 Dalestanbridge
- 6941 Dalgarno
- 2919 Dali
- 3187 Dalian
- 3384 Daliya
- 6156 Dall
- 6114 Dalla-Degregori
- 15950 Dallago
- 8084 Dallas
- 90288 Dalleave
- 151351 Dalleore
- 15385 Dallolmo
- 10421 Dalmatin
- 12292 Dalton
- 4226 Damiaan
- 134063 Damianhammond
- 26732 Damianpeach
- 10284 Damienlemay
- 5717 Damir
- 5335 Damocles
- 14876 Dampier
- 34659 Damyasouami
- 328870 Danabarbato
- 61 Danaë
- 20312 Danahy
- 135991 Danarmstrong
- 7195 Danboice
- 4395 Danbritt
- 3415 Danby
- 4021 Dancey
- 37530 Dancingangel
- 9812 Danco
- 22612 Dandibner
- 783129 Danescu
- 20039 Danfalk
- 17037 Danfleisch
- 129188 Dangallagher
- 16529 Dangoldin
- 30593 Dangovski
- 3120 Dangrania
- 2068 Dangreen
- 10482 Dangrieser
- 25589 Danicamckellar
- 20618 Daniebutler
- 2589 Daniel
- 107054 Daniela
- 52959 Danieladepaulis
- 13250 Danieladucato
- 113621 Danielafaggi
- 129187 Danielalfred
- 13305 Danielang
- 18708 Danielappel
- 80008 Danielarhodes
- 24619 Danielarsham
- 128345 Danielbamberger
- 37853 Danielbarbier
- 24236 Danielberger
- 11203 Danielbetten
- 30160 Danielbruce
- 439718 Danielcervantes
- 20266 Danielchoi
- 23197 Danielcook
- 133745 Danieldrinnon
- 112320 Danielegardiol
- 333172 Danielellis
- 407016 Danielerdag
- 27405 Danielfeeny
- 16080 Danielfeng
- 28957 Danielfulop
- 130069 Danielgaudreau
- 17907 Danielgude
- 161585 Danielhals
- 70712 Danieljoanna
- 34490 Danielkang
- 231841 Danielkatz
- 20299 Danielkelley
- 308753 Daniellezemp
- 21557 Daniellitt
- 119967 Daniellong
- 23756 Daniellozano
- 27615 Daniellu
- 13346 Danielmiller
- 836112 Danieloconnell
- 200000 Danielparrott
- 130319 Danielpelham
- 25775 Danielpeng
- 256374 Danielpequignot
- 12503 Danielpeterson
- 555816 Danielposey
- 31598 Danielrudin
- 315088 Daniels
- 6132 Danielson
- 18632 Danielsson
- 19660 Danielsteck
- 20600 Danieltse
- 77318 Danieltsui
- 128372 Danielwibben
- 8109 Danielwilliam
- 34208 Danielzhang
- 18563 Danigoldman
- 308856 Daniket
- 3964 Danilevskij
- 79641 Daniloceirani
- 59833 Danimatter
- 34469 Danishmahmood
- 1594 Danjon
- 203602 Danjoyce
- 182786 Dankobosanac
- 27503 Dankof
- 29562 Danmacdonald
- 2117 Danmark
- 11859 Danngarcia
- 13244 Dannymeyer
- 13168 Danoconnell
- 11507 Danpascu
- 10487 Danpeterson
- 22063 Dansealey
- 43935 Danshechtman
- 13788 Dansolander
- 100053 Danstinebring
- 10081 Dantaylor
- 2999 Dante
- 120214 Danteberdeguez
- 28563 Dantzler
- 1381 Danubia
- 653667 Dănuționescu
- 5463 Danwelcher
- 21813 Danwinegar
- 21488 Danyellelee
- 225711 Danyzy
- 1419 Danzig
- 10720 Danzl
- 383417 DAO
- 20308 Daohaili
- 41 Daphne
- 2645 Daphne Plane
- 18734 Darboux
- 7272 Darbydyar
- 23928 Darbywoodard
- 19466 Darcydiegel
- 22838 Darcyhampton
- 31787 Darcylawson
- 12508 Darcysloe
- 18268 Dardanos
- 4827 Dares
- 27005 Dariaguidetti
- 73551 Dariocastellano
- 37835 Darioconsigli
- 100553 Dariofo
- 126248 Dariooliviero
- 20624 Dariozanetti
- 7210 Darius
- 21073 Darksky
- 31861 Darleshimizu
- 241418 Darmstadt
- 13806 Darmstrong
- 24546 Darnell
- 10156 Darnley
- 152454 Darnyi
- 12083 Darone
- 24305 Darrellparnell
- 188502 Darrellstrobel
- 33488 Darrelrobertson
- 13903 Darrylwatanabe
- 31854 Darshanashah
- 58700 Darson
- 1991 Darwin
- 18019 Dascoli
- 3321 Dasha
- 4594 Dashkova
- 33503 Dasilvaborges
- 4495 Dassanowsky
- 28485 Dastidar
- 6859 Datemasamune
- 129314 Dathongolish
- 3146 Dato
- 1270 Datura
- 42609 Daubechies
- 11484 Daudet
- 592244 Daukantas
- 633225 Daukša
- 12612 Daumier
- 8665 Daun-Eifel
- 11378 Dauria
- 121865 Dauvergne
- 16424 Davaine
- 30935 Davasobel
- 22151 Davebracy
- 5748 Davebrin
- 524607 Davecarter
- 15887 Daveclark
- 123860 Davederrick
- 292160 Davefask
- 33748 Davegault
- 8456 Davegriep
- 129327 Davehamara
- 50250 Daveharrington
- 33750 Davehiggins
- 164536 Davehinson
- 39645 Davelharris
- 90537 Daveholland
- 21782 Davemcdonald
- 6111 Davemckay
- 5952 Davemonet
- 33195 Davenyadav
- 6953 Davepierce
- 90818 Daverichards
- 6435 Daveross
- 28436 Davesawyer
- 27530 Daveshuck
- 52316 Daveslater
- 406737 Davet
- 27810 Daveturner
- 13808 Davewilliams
- 34227 Daveyhuang
- 2725 David Bender
- 4205 David Hughes
- 511 Davida
- 747532 Davidabrown
- 10181 Davidacomba
- 5332 Davidaguilar
- 24153 Davidalex
- 4499 Davidallen
- 12589 Davidanand
- 73079 Davidbaltimore
- 21426 Davidbauer
- 5920 Davidbell
- 70401 Davidbishop
- 27276 Davidblack
- 8997 Davidblewett
- 342843 Davidbowie
- 5845 Davidbrewster
- 34543 Davidbriggs
- 51825 Davidbrown
- 28654 Davidcaine
- 28324 Davidcampeau
- 63162 Davidčapek
- 11751 Davidcarroll
- 134169 Davidcarte
- 103016 Davidčástek
- 10047 Davidchapman
- 22675 Davidcohn
- 25957 Davidconnell
- 316010 Daviddubey
- 6608 Davidecrespi
- 19574 Davidedwards
- 112340 Davidegaddi
- 256547 Davidesmith
- 50866 Davidesprizzi
- 31877 Davideverett
- 29988 Davidezilli
- 314703 Davidflynn
- 100600 Davidfossé
- 19969 Davidfreedman
- 111913 Davidgans
- 15911 Davidgauthier
- 7120 Davidgavine
- 741647 Davidge
- 208117 Davidgerdes
- 10035 Davidgheesling
- 11761 Davidgill
- 21578 Davidgillette
- 24278 Davidgreen
- 199763 Davidgregory
- 12991 Davidgriffiths
- 32443 Davidhaack
- 134008 Davidhammond
- 13329 Davidhardy
- 11943 Davidhartley
- 16064 Davidharvey
- 100051 Davidhernandez
- 14682 Davidhirsch
- 14234 Davidhoover
- 344040 Davidiactor
- 51741 Davidixon
- 12642 Davidjansen
- 84095 Davidjohn
- 8663 Davidjohnston
- 245943 Davidjoseph
- 21639 Davidkaufman
- 168635 Davidkaufmann
- 24201 Davidkeith
- 22531 Davidkelley
- 25516 Davidknight
- 20557 Davidkulka
- 117032 Davidlane
- 25517 Davidlau
- 7037 Davidlean
- 542762 Davidlee
- 27606 Davidli
- 31426 Davidlouapre
- 28792 Davidlowell
- 33600 Davidlu
- 262876 Davidlynch
- 73046 Davidmann
- 113388 Davidmartinez
- 172090 Davidmccomas
- 33942 Davidmiller
- 11470 Davidminton
- 8135 Davidmitchell
- 34320 Davidmonge
- 23048 Davidnelson
- 22603 Davidoconnor
- 46053 Davidpatterson
- 23751 Davidprice
- 62701 Davidrankin
- 33135 Davidrisoldi
- 48773 Davidrowe
- 91389 Davidsaewert
- 8628 Davidsaltzberg
- 9097 Davidschlag
- 15026 Davidscott
- 30060 Davidseong
- 26474 Davidsimon
- 70720 Davidskillman
- 11798 Davidsson
- 20047 Davidsuzuki
- 22819 Davidtao
- 19393 Davidthompson
- 154902 Davidtoth
- 70207 Davidunlap
- 27373 Davidvernon
- 20345 Davidvito
- 21653 Davidwang
- 1037 Davidweilla
- 15858 Davidwoods
- 34277 Davidxingwu
- 21357 Davidying
- 20623 Davidyoung
- 31719 Davidyue
- 33202 Davignon
- 330440 Davinadon
- 3638 Davis
- 30357 Davisdon
- 28446 Davlantes
- 3605 Davy
- 3126 Davydov
- 12071 Davykim
- 257425 Davykirkpatrick
- 4393 Dawe
- 37941 Dawidowicz
- 10461 Dawilliams
- 8331 Dawkins
- 1618 Dawn
- 25369 Dawndonovan
- 32106 Dawngraninger
- 1829 Dawson
- 771914 Dawsoncharles
- 23102 Dayanli
- 231446 Dayao
- 19917 Dazaifu
- 23949 Dazapata
- 29991 Dazimmerman
- 15330 de Almeida
- 6512 de Bergh
- 343412 de Boer
- 22996 De Boo
- 30883 de Broglie
- 273230 de Bruyn
- 20792 De Cicco
- 12526 de Coninck
- 65821 De Curtis
- 10674 de Elía
- 4279 De Gasparis
- 69434 de Gerlache
- 11243 de Graauw
- 10444 de Hevesy
- 3798 de Jager
- 76272 De Jong
- 20791 de Kleer
- 13641 de Lesseps
- 38667 de Lignie
- 33219 De Los Santos
- 14403 de Machault
- 190310 De Martin
- 5589 De Meis
- 26849 De Paepe
- 5522 De Rop
- 333487 De Rose
- 12150 De Ruyter
- 44039 de Sahagún
- 3268 De Sanctis
- 13580 de Saussure
- 154714 de Schepper
- 161315 de Shalit
- 1686 De Sitter
- 291325 de Tyard
- 12687 de Valory
- 20103 de Vico
- 15785 de Villegas
- 12650 de Vries
- 27565 de Wet
- 134244 De Young
- 10970 de Zeeuw
- 13408 Deadoklestic
- 123794 Deadwood
- 34312 Deahaupt
- 68114 Deákferenc
- 333089 Dean
- 134027 Deanbooher
- 5860 Deankoontz
- 27343 Deannashea
- 8815 Deanregas
- 470324 Debbanci
- 2359 Debehogne
- 23131 Debenedictis
- 17265 Debennett
- 3411 Debetencourt
- 30142 Debfrazier
- 32544 Debjaniroy
- 541 Deborah
- 27282 Deborahday
- 20897 Deborahdomingue
- 14174 Deborahsmall
- 152067 Deboy
- 27470 Debrabeckett
- 31774 Debralas
- 180855 Debrarose
- 133861 Debrawilmer
- 82071 Debrecen
- 20059 Debswoboda
- 4492 Debussy
- 390813 Debwatson
- 25406 Debwysocki
- 30852 Debye
- 2551 Decabrina
- 3610 Decampos
- 30146 Decandia
- 5329 Decaro
- 34351 Decatur
- 110298 Deceptionisland
- 10087 Dechesne
- 349499 Dechirico
- 15034 Décines
- 13554 Decleir
- 2852 Declercq
- 45261 Decoen
- 13395 Deconihout
- 19293 Dedekind
- 11898 Dedeyn
- 34153 Deeannguo
- 120308 Deebradel
- 32037 Deepikakurup
- 8897 Defelice
- 10332 Défi
- 1295 Deflotte
- 111818 Deforest
- 14309 Defoy
- 6673 Degas
- 117711 Degenfeld
- 5274 Degewij
- 21822 Degiorgi
- 10964 Degraaff
- 24495 Degroff
- 333139 Deguzman
- 11895 Dehant
- 48415 Dehio
- 165574 Deidre
- 40241 Deienno
- 5638 Deikoon
- 9514 Deineka
- 32496 Deïopites
- 1867 Deiphobus
- 4060 Deipylos
- 9790 Deipyrus
- 1244 Deira
- 183287 Deisenstein
- 10785 Dejaiffe
- 1555 Dejan
- 157 Dejanira
- 184 Dejopeja
- 91607 Delaboudinière
- 10310 Delacroix
- 3893 DeLaeter
- 15008 Delahodde
- 13962 Delambre
- 16975 Delamere
- 8745 Delaney
- 3002 Delasalle
- 8688 Delaunay
- 35222 Delbarrio
- 16250 Delbó
- 15264 Delbrück
- 3060 Delcano
- 19390 Deledda
- 38470 Deleflie
- 77755 Delémont
- 17934 Deleon
- 12716 Delft
- 30541 Delgadillo
- 23221 Delgado
- 12005 Delgiudice
- 196938 Delgordon
- 395 Delia
- 23937 Delibes
- 560 Delila
- 12742 Delisle
- 12910 Deliso
- 8059 Deliyannis
- 325455 Della Valle
- 133744 Dellagiustina
- 30363 Dellasantina
- 7704 Dellen
- 38966 Deller
- 78392 Dellinger
- 16055 Dellisanti
- 19528 Delloro
- 15631 Dellorusso
- 249823 Delmarbarker
- 3058 Delmary
- 11147 Delmas
- 1988 Delores
- 17793 Delorio
- 8282 Delp
- 73769 Delphi
- 3218 Delphine
- 14104 Delpino
- 1274 Delportia
- 31458 Delrosso
- 87142 Delsanti
- 2954 Delsemme
- 92525 Delucchi
- 84012 Deluise
- 336465 Deluna
- 1848 Delvaux
- 6219 Demalia
- 3390 Demanet
- 11968 Demariotte
- 9641 Demazière
- 177625 Dembicky
- 349 Dembowska
- 14141 Demeautis
- 8070 DeMeo
- 31491 Demessie
- 1108 Demeter
- 358894 Demetrescu
- 32053 Demetrimaxim
- 16372 Demichele
- 1926 Demiddelaer
- 5086 Demin
- 32569 Deming
- 279226 Demisroussos
- 240022 Demitra
- 546498 Demjénferenc
- 28390 Demjohopkins
- 11429 Demodokus
- 6129 Demokritos
- 18493 Demoleon
- 4057 Demophon
- 100133 Demosthenes
- 4218 Demottoni
- 1335 Demoulina
- 23879 Demura
- 25867 DeMuth
- 20243 Den Bosch
- 6194 Denali
- 4340 Dence
- 41502 Denchukun
- 19476 Denduluri
- 9026 Denevi
- 255989 Dengyushian
- 9140 Deni
- 184315 Denisbogan
- 667 Denise
- 33478 Deniselivon
- 212501 Deniserichards
- 378810 Deniserothrock
- 27576 Denisespirou
- 69839 Denishuber
- 597469 Denisleahy
- 79849 Denismourard
- 33160 Denismukwege
- 30304 Denisvida
- 5155 Denisyuk
- 19349 Denjoy
- 18162 Denlea
- 12267 Denneau
- 71885 Denning
- 27423 Dennisbowers
- 707242 Denniscrabtree
- 2134 Dennispalm
- 4706 Dennisreuter
- 294727 Dennisritchie
- 23257 Denny
- 4120 Denoyelle
- 25670 Densley
- 10850 Denso
- 25823 Dentrujillo
- 27504 Denune
- 18127 Denversmith
- 127664 Denza
- 11296 Denzen
- 5942 Denzilrobert
- 19999 Depardieu
- 31839 Depinto
- 30088 Deprá
- 9795 Deprez
- 72042 Dequeiroz
- 28660 Derbes
- 69273 Derbyastro
- 3685 Derdenye
- 42795 Derekmuller
- 128315 Dereknelson
- 129053 Derekshannon
- 33420 Derekwoo
- 2400 Derevskaya
- 8984 Derevyanko
- 1806 Derice
- 12566 Derichardson
- 9589 Deridder
- 27493 Derikesibill
- 143579 Dérimiksa
- 28784 Deringer
- 3647 Dermott
- 25520 Deronchang
- 201777 Deronda
- 4142 Dersu-Uzala
- 4314 Dervan
- 23409 Derzhavin
- 1339 Désagneauxa
- 24526 Desai
- 227151 Desargues
- 1588 Descamisada
- 17869 Descamps
- 3587 Descartes
- 9926 Desch
- 11230 Deschaffer
- 8729 Descour
- 666 Desdemona
- 10830 Desforges
- 51419 Deshapriya
- 25418 Deshmukh
- 22924 Deshpande
- 344 Desiderata
- 11763 Deslandres
- 348034 Deslorieux
- 5339 Desmars
- 12500 Desngai
- 7718 Desnoux
- 21530 Despiau
- 6583 Destinn
- 24103 Dethury
- 52294 Detlef
- 1538 Detre
- 53311 Deucalion
- 236987 Deustua
- 78386 Deuzelur
- 31977 Devalapurkar
- 21380 Devanssay
- 15818 DeVeny
- 399565 Dévényanna
- 39877 Deverchére
- 90279 Devětsil
- 21419 Devience
- 37223 Devillepoix
- 333018 Devin
- 3561 Devine
- 11858 Devinpoland
- 117581 Devinschrader
- 121328 Devlynrfennell
- 41184 Devogèle
- 8243 Devonburr
- 4262 DeVorkin
- 337 Devosa
- 1328 Devota
- 217510 Dewaldroode
- 9420 Dewar
- 15436 Dexius
- 3662 Dezhnev
- 3892 Dezsö
- 170927 Dgebessire
- 12178 Dhani
- 2109 Dhôtel
- 34822 Dhruvikparikh
- 28722 Dhruviyer
- 108201 Di Blasi
- 17435 di Giovanni
- 3247 Di Martino
- 25673 Di Mascio
- 767327 Diamandi
- 19774 Diamondback
- 78 Diana
- 743062 Dianabeșliu
- 33034 Dianadamrau
- 21520 Dianaeheart
- 50252 Dianahannikainen
- 27537 Dianaweintraub
- 155270 Dianawheeler
- 262825 Dianearbus
- 28331 Dianebérard
- 14153 Dianecaplain
- 18077 Dianeingrao
- 129167 Dianelambert
- 12676 Dianemerline
- 14275 Dianemurray
- 18184 Dianepark
- 33004 Dianesipiera
- 21943 Diannacowern
- 28171 Diannahu
- 28688 Diannerister
- 2389 Dibaj
- 14129 DiBucci
- 3841 Dicicco
- 17458 Dick
- 21362 Dickarmstrong
- 13003 Dickbeasley
- 4370 Dickens
- 71483 Dickgottfried
- 5272 Dickinson
- 59804 Dickjoyce
- 17269 Dicksmith
- 838404 Dickson
- 10717 Dickwalker
- 91214 Diclemente
- 5351 Diderot
- 21156 Didierlockwood
- 275215 Didiermarouani
- 145559 Didiermüller
- 278225 Didierpelat
- 4165 Didkovskij
- 209 Dido
- 65803 Didymos
- 15276 Diebel
- 1706 Dieckvoss
- 6059 Diefenbach
- 269300 Diego
- 31429 Diegoazzaro
- 90138 Diehl
- 591808 Dienesvaléria
- 5318 Dientzenhofer
- 10093 Diesel
- 103460 Dieterherrmann
- 211343 Dieterhusar
- 554766 Dieterkasan
- 24858 Diethelm
- 210432 Dietmarhopp
- 333600 Dietrich
- 429084 Dietrichrex
- 4666 Dietz
- 550666 Difrancesco
- 10102 Digerhuvud
- 10808 Digerrojr
- 33213 Diggs
- 10088 Digne
- 9379 Dijon
- 2922 Dikanʹka
- 99 Dike
- 270984 Dikschmidt
- 35734 Dilithium
- 22631 Dillard
- 50553 Dilles
- 78393 Dillon
- 10579 Diluca
- 3767 DiMaggio
- 25276 Dimai
- 78123 Dimare
- 4590 Dimashchegolev
- 27923 Dimitribartolini
- 2371 Dimitrov
- 19119 Dimpna
- 374715 Dimpourbaix
- 17472 Dinah
- 2765 Dinant
- 735177 Dinev
- 15882 Dingzhong
- 152830 Dinkinesh
- 26498 Dinotina
- 22632 DiNovis
- 1437 Diomedes
- 106 Dione
- 281105 Dionneross
- 3671 Dionysus
- 20461 Dioretsa
- 423 Diotima
- 27130 Dipaola
- 181241 Dipasquale
- 21887 Dipippo
- 58671 Diplodocus
- 5997 Dirac
- 11665 Dirichlet
- 1805 Dirikis
- 243094 Dirlewanger
- 1319 Disa
- 28948 Disalvo
- 15630 Disanti
- 9770 Discovery
- 4017 Disneya
- 21999 Disora
- 29696 Distasio
- 11037 Distler
- 27977 Distratis
- 3535 Ditte
- 19188 Dittebesard
- 283141 Dittsche
- 29196 Dius
- 4882 Divari
- 65487 Divinacommedia
- 375798 Divini
- 5103 Diviš
- 15954 Divjotbedi
- 7076 Divnýjanko
- 34011 Divyakranthi
- 25764 Divyanag
- 6776 Dix
- 11833 Dixon
- 32052 Diyamathur
- 5831 Dizzy
- 94291 Django
- 24421 Djorgovski
- 264077 Dluzhnevskaya
- 13489 Dmitrienko
- 549996 Dmitriiguliutin
- 34583 Dmitriivavilov
- 27658 Dmitrijbagalej
- 202778 Dmytria
- 55555 DNA
- 32853 Döbereiner
- 3022 Dobermann
- 21517 Dobi
- 27960 Dobiáš
- 30778 Döblin
- 35367 Dobrédílo
- 17600 Dobřichovice
- 3119 Dobronravin
- 3013 Dobrovoleva
- 1789 Dobrovolsky
- 40440 Dobrovský
- 4762 Dobrynya
- 39880 Dobšinský
- 18024 Dobson
- 27714 Dochu
- 5050 Doctorwatson
- 14313 Dodaira
- 148707 Dodelson
- 6336 Dodo
- 10068 Dodoens
- 382 Dodona
- 71669 Dodsonprince
- 10504 Doga
- 11064 Dogen
- 6363 Doggett
- 7484 Dogo Onsen
- 362316 Dogora
- 4975 Dohmoto
- 4746 Doi
- 10827 Doikazunori
- 121480 Dolanhighsmith
- 14223 Dolby
- 779957 Dolea
- 11126 Doleček
- 26247 Doleonardi
- 120103 Dolero
- 5884 Dolezal
- 7223 Dolgorukij
- 10989 Dolios
- 7449 Döllen
- 2451 Dollfus
- 10731 Dollyparton
- 3661 Dolmatovskij
- 58191 Dolomiten
- 7815 Dolon
- 264150 Dolops
- 1277 Dolores
- 164215 Doloreshill
- 6849 Doloreshuerta
- 29193 Dolphyn
- 27659 Dolsky
- 19769 Dolyniuk
- 441563 Domanski
- 19806 Domatthews
- 279397 Dombeck
- 18883 Domegge
- 2784 Domeyko
- 22685 Dominguez
- 33619 Dominickrowan
- 34571 Dominicyap
- 192293 Dominikbrunner
- 8217 Dominikhašek
- 30487 Dominikovacs
- 24899 Dominiona
- 4020 Dominique
- 3450 Dommanget
- 5187 Domon
- 142291 Dompfaff
- 3552 Don Quixote
- 12410 Donald Duck
- 9448 Donaldavies
- 18775 Donaldeng
- 20553 Donaldhowk
- 52246 Donaldjohanson
- 11267 Donaldkessler
- 757109 Donaldmoffatt
- 28793 Donaldpaul
- 35364 Donaldpray
- 249514 Donaldroyer
- 27082 Donaldson-Hanna
- 9295 Donaldyoung
- 90479 Donalek
- 5186 Donalu
- 2176 Donar
- 290074 Donasadock
- 18075 Donasharma
- 131763 Donátbánki
- 6056 Donatello
- 16682 Donati
- 20200 Donbacky
- 113950 Donbaldwin
- 19916 Donbass
- 4553 Doncampbell
- 127689 Doncapone
- 11876 Doncarpenter
- 13330 Dondavis
- 6628 Dondelia
- 305181 Donelaitis
- 21965 Dones
- 150520 Dong
- 20310 Donggooroh
- 3476 Dongguan
- 11812 Dongqiao
- 25858 Donherbert
- 11075 Dönhoff
- 9494 Donici
- 9912 Donizetti
- 168221 Donjennings
- 11419 Donjohnson
- 454326 Donlee
- 6688 Donmccarthy
- 4689 Donn
- 3085 Donna
- 22889 Donnablaney
- 15321 Donnadean
- 22855 Donnajones
- 23062 Donnamooney
- 30241 Donnamower
- 16222 Donnanderson
- 5649 Donnashirley
- 70781 Donnelly
- 1398 Donnera
- 10455 Donnison
- 77971 Donnolo
- 78578 Donpettit
- 9177 Donsaari
- 5613 Donskoj
- 16111 Donstrittmatter
- 20022 Dontown
- 6067 Donutil
- 25510 Donvincent
- 99891 Donwells
- 8791 Donyabradshaw
- 174363 Donyork
- 12622 Doppelmayr
- 3905 Doppler
- 668 Dora
- 10045 Dorarussell
- 3858 Dorchester
- 4888 Doreen
- 28656 Doreencurtin
- 7456 Doressoundiram
- 4076 Dörffel
- 173002 Dorfi
- 24380 Dorippe
- 48 Doris
- 13405 Dorisbillings
- 603380 Dorisbrougham
- 25413 Dorischen
- 22025 Dorisdaou
- 84884 Dorismcmillan
- 23128 Dorminy
- 3802 Dornburg
- 20029 Dorner
- 7271 Doroguntsov
- 19120 Doronina
- 339 Dorothea
- 34285 Dorothydady
- 149243 Dorothynorton
- 13761 Dorristaylor
- 3416 Dorrit
- 73693 Dorschner
- 3194 Dorsey
- 5199 Dortmund
- 16058 Doshi
- 7144 Dossobuono
- 15902 Dostál
- 3453 Dostoevsky
- 20315 Dotson
- 9721 Doty
- 280642 Doubs
- 6786 Doudantsutsuji
- 6060 Doudleby
- 8595 Dougallii
- 43282 Dougbock
- 12494 Doughamilton
- 701781 Dougjohnstone
- 2684 Douglas
- 25924 Douglasadams
- 400796 Douglass
- 170022 Douglastucker
- 128795 Douglaswalker
- 128389 Dougleland
- 25133 Douglin
- 235985 Dougrodgers
- 29980 Dougsimons
- 24270 Dougskinner
- 17925 Dougweinberg
- 28131 Dougwelch
- 3881 Doumergua
- 33537 Doungnga
- 12189 Dovgyj
- 4520 Dovzhenko
- 40328 Dow
- 16239 Dower
- 3529 Dowling
- 24027 Downs
- 45073 Doyanrose
- 90817 Doylehall
- 575108 Doyrantsi
- 24124 Dozier
- 17602 Dr. G.
- 22725 Drabble
- 4489 Dracius
- 179411 Draganroša
- 12498 Dragesco
- 25115 Drago
- 135695 Dragomirescu
- 181419 Dragonera
- 9022 Drake
- 620 Drakonia
- 572217 Dramba
- 545060 Drapáljános
- 13122 Drava
- 634559 Drayer
- 6488 Drebach
- 27974 Drejsl
- 263 Dresda
- 3053 Dresden
- 15359 Dressler
- 23452 Drew
- 28707 Drewbecker
- 6466 Drewesquivel
- 25551 Drewhall
- 33508 Drewnik
- 4536 Drewpinsky
- 31594 Drewprevost
- 22282 Dreyer
- 6317 Dreyfus
- 4009 Drobyshevskij
- 332733 Drolshagen
- 5442 Drossart
- 12240 Droste-Hülshoff
- 129312 Drouetdaubigny
- 18334 Drozdov
- 4671 Drtikol
- 11262 Drube
- 6263 Druckmüller
- 3273 Drukar
- 9705 Drummen
- 4693 Drummond
- 3804 Drunina
- 121637 Druscillaperry
- 289121 Druskininkai
- 4970 Druyan
- 1621 Druzhba
- 18278 Dymas
- 314082 Dryope
- 12059 du Châtelet
- 16271 Duanenichols
- 25689 Duannihuang
- 15214 Duart
- 232409 Dubes
- 1167 Dubiago
- 391042 Dubietis
- 6359 Dubinin
- 333544 Dubisher
- 9515 Dubner
- 206241 Dubois
- 2312 Duboshin
- 5678 DuBridge
- 11621 Duccio
- 6221 Ducentesima
- 400 Ducrosa
- 13059 Ducuroir
- 333233 Duda
- 9737 Dudarova
- 26119 Duden
- 8470 Dudinskaya
- 3270 Dudley
- 20469 Dudleymoore
- 8795 Dudorov
- 564 Dudu
- 30234 Dudziński
- 367943 Duende
- 9327 Duerbeck
- 15338 Dufault
- 3781 Dufek
- 8797 Duffard
- 5169 Duffell
- 1961 Dufour
- 110289 Dufu
- 2772 Dugan
- 19617 Duhamel
- 66000 Duilialoncao
- 20037 Duke
- 20218 Dukewriter
- 17749 Dulbecco
- 571 Dulcinea
- 10991 Dulov
- 9059 Dumas
- 43667 Dumlupınar
- 9554 Dumont
- 23617 Duna
- 4306 Dunaevskij
- 1962 Dunant
- 3718 Dunbar
- 2753 Duncan
- 28493 Duncan-Lewis
- 3368 Duncombe
- 101461 Dunedin
- 3123 Dunham
- 4273 Dunhuang
- 19694 Dunkelman
- 34650 Dunkenberger
- 6865 Dunkerley
- 3291 Dunlap
- 13849 Dunn
- 13376 Dunphy
- 34479 Dunschen
- 26298 Dunweathers
- 29825 Dunyazade
- 18579 Duongtuyenvu
- 1338 Duponta
- 214485 Dupouy
- 13031 Durance
- 11499 Duras
- 4389 Durbin
- 6141 Durda
- 21888 Ďurech
- 306019 Duren
- 3104 Dürer
- 157494 Durham
- 5567 Durisen
- 10330 Durkheim
- 26438 Durling
- 2231 Durrell
- 14041 Dürrenmatt
- 221673 Duschl
- 14054 Dušek
- 23944 Dusser
- 209148 Dustindeford
- 20482 Dustinshea
- 246842 Dutchstapelbroek
- 20272 Duyha
- 23322 Duyingsewa
- 2055 Dvořák
- 22249 Dvorets Pionerov
- 16241 Dvorsky
- 146442 Dwaynebrown
- 173395 Dweinberg
- 92579 Dwight
- 9497 Dwingeloo
- 2591 Dworetsky
- 27347 Dworkin
- 2048 Dwornik
- 4005 Dyagilev
- 30569 Dybczyński
- 20207 Dyckovsky
- 78434 Dyer
- 28581 Dyerlytle
- 33395 Dylanli
- 30549 Dylanshort
- 13130 Dylanthomas
- 13733 Dylanyoung
- 10271 Dymond
- 200 Dynamene
- 71489 Dynamocamp
- 1241 Dysona
- 7318 Dyukov
- 3082 Dzhalil
- 2756 Dzhangar
- 3170 Dzhanibekov
- 471143 Dziewanna
- 319636 Dziewulski
- 3687 Dzus
back to top

== See also ==
- List of minor planet discoverers
- List of observatory codes
- Meanings of minor planet names § Index
