= 1414 Jérôme =

Main-belt asteroid

Discovery
- Discovered by: L. Boyer
- Discovery site: Algiers Obs.
- Discovery date: 12 February 1937

Designations
- Named after: Jérôme Boyer (father of discoverer)
- Alternative designations: 1937 CE · 1951 EO_{1}
- Minor planet category: main-belt · (middle); Dora

Orbital characteristics
- Epoch 16 February 2017 (JD 2457800.5)
- Uncertainty parameter 0
- Observation arc: 79.34 yr (28,979 days)
- Aphelion: 3.2338 AU
- Perihelion: 2.3351 AU
- Semi-major axis: 2.7844 AU
- Eccentricity: 0.1614
- Orbital period (sidereal): 4.65 yr (1,697 days)
- Mean anomaly: 67.505°
- Mean motion: 0° 12^{m} 43.56^{s} / day
- Inclination: 8.8558°
- Longitude of ascending node: 143.76°
- Argument of perihelion: 2.7504°

Physical characteristics
- Dimensions: 15.105±0.453 km 17.24 km (IRAS:4)
- Geometric albedo: 0.054±0.014; 0.0652±0.011 (IRAS:4)
- Spectral type: SMASS = Ch
- Absolute magnitude (H): 13.1

1414 Jérôme, provisional designation 1937 CE, is a carbonaceous Dorian asteroid from the central region of the asteroid belt, approximately 16 kilometers in diameter. It was discovered on 12 February 1937 by, French astronomer Louis Boyer at Algiers Observatory, Algeria, in northern Africa, and named after his father Jérôme Boyer.

== Orbit and classification ==
Jérôme is a member of the Dora family (FIN: 512), a well-established central asteroid family of more than 1,200 carbonaceous asteroids. The family's namesake is 668 Dora. It is alternatively known as the "Zhongolovich family", named after its presumably largest member 1734 Zhongolovich. The Dora family may also contain a subfamily.

Jérôme orbits the Sun in the middle main-belt at a distance of 2.3–3.2 AU once every 4 years and 8 months (1,697 days). Its orbit has an eccentricity of 0.16 and an inclination of 9° with respect to the ecliptic. The body's observation arc starts with its official discovery observation, as no precoveries were taken and no prior identifications were made.

== Physical characteristics ==
Jérôme is a dark C-type asteroid, classified as a hydrated Ch-subtype in the SMASS classification scheme.

According to the surveys carried out by the Infrared Astronomical Satellite IRAS and NASA's Wide-field Infrared Survey Explorer with its subsequent NEOWISE mission, Jérôme measures 15.1 and 17.2 kilometers in diameter, and its surface has an albedo of 0.065 and 0.054, respectively. It has an absolute magnitude of 13.1.

=== Lightcurves ===
As of 2017, Jérôme's rotation period, spin axis and shape remains unknown.

== Naming ==
This minor planet was named by the discoverer in honour of his father, Jérôme Boyer. Naming citation was first mentioned in The Names of the Minor Planets by Paul Herget in 1955 (H 128).
