= List of named minor planets: Y =

This is a partial list of named minor planets, containing all those starting with the letter Y, as of 9 November 2026. It is ordered in a case-insensitive, alphabetical manner and contains a total of 419 entries. Grey minor planets have no article and redirect to the list of minor planets instead (see List of minor planets § Main index).

== Y ==
- 43794 Yabetakemoto
- 4631 Yabu
- 5192 Yabuki
- 9655 Yaburanger
- 2652 Yabuuti
- 21327 Yabuzuka
- 8493 Yachibozu
- 23241 Yada
- 117568 Yadame
- 9869 Yadoumaru
- 29632 Yaejikim
- 9788 Yagami
- 12908 Yagudina
- 22355 Yahabananshozan
- 4941 Yahagi
- 333639 Yaima
- 7956 Yaji
- 9719 Yakage
- 54510 Yakagehonjin
- 11140 Yakedake
- 146985 Yakelinromero
- 1653 Yakhontovia
- 8865 Yakiimo
- 5614 Yakovlev
- 14149 Yakowitz
- 5994 Yakubovich
- 20193 Yakushima
- 8940 Yakushimaru
- 2607 Yakutia
- 24986 Yalefan
- 23220 Yalemichaels
- 13915 Yalow
- 1475 Yalta
- 3786 Yamada
- 15202 Yamada-Houkoku
- 7039 Yamagata
- 10864 Yamagatashi
- 48607 Yamagatatemodai
- 15841 Yamaguchi
- 15351 Yamaguchimamoru
- 21294 Yamaguchiyuko
- 8923 Yamakawa
- 13380 Yamamohammed
- 2249 Yamamoto
- 5687 Yamamotoshinobu
- 18087 Yamanaka
- 5473 Yamanashi
- 10512 Yamandu
- 9396 Yamaneakisato
- 23644 Yamaneko
- 8097 Yamanishi
- 7193 Yamaoka
- 6497 Yamasaki
- 11087 Yamasakimakoto
- 21161 Yamashitaharuo
- 23465 Yamashitakouhei
- 22351 Yamashitatoshiki
- 4929 Yamatai
- 10888 Yamatano-orochi
- 85401 Yamatenclub
- 5282 Yamatotakeru
- 32184 Yamaura
- 16439 Yamehoshinokawa
- 83363 Yamwingwah
- 2693 Yan'an
- 73782 Yanagida
- 23591 Yanagisawa
- 4260 Yanai
- 9206 Yanaikeizo
- 22489 Yanaka
- 12866 Yanamadala
- 327421 Yanamandra
- 46643 Yanase
- 19664 Yancey
- 12225 Yanfernández
- 3421 Yangchenning
- 3039 Yangel
- 85728 Yangfujia
- 27910 Yangfuyu
- 10410 Yangguanghua
- 11637 Yangjiachi
- 17140 Yangkevin
- 16164 Yangli
- 23761 Yangliqing
- 21064 Yangliwei
- 118418 Yangmei
- 219983 Yangtongyu
- 12757 Yangtze
- 26720 Yangxinyan
- 330640 Yangxuejun
- 267017 Yangzhifa
- 3729 Yangzhou
- 11730 Yanhua
- 10611 Yanjici
- 24439 Yanney
- 59381 Yannickmellier
- 17070 Yanniksingh
- 20082 Yannlecun
- 8906 Yano
- 15856 Yanokoji
- 4576 Yanotoyohiko
- 19443 Yanzhong
- 175633 Yaoan
- 41981 Yaobeina
- 25612 Yaoskalucia
- 31291 Yaoyue
- 29550 Yaribartolini
- 11137 Yarigatake
- 2273 Yarilo
- 29655 Yarimlee
- 35334 Yarkovsky
- 3470 Yaronika
- 4437 Yaroshenko
- 15212 Yaroslavlʹ
- 13349 Yarotsky
- 3442 Yashin
- 29992 Yasminezubi
- 157894 Yasminwalter
- 17268 Yasonik
- 9230 Yasuda
- 23448 Yasudatakeshi
- 8101 Yasue
- 11974 Yasuhidefujita
- 18818 Yasuhiko
- 14036 Yasuhirotoyama
- 807579 Yasuhiroyasuko
- 31438 Yasuhitohayashi
- 26855 Yasukohasegawa
- 27955 Yasumasa
- 10822 Yasunori
- 10695 Yasunorifujiwara
- 7890 Yasuofukui
- 292343 Yasuosato
- 10188 Yasuoyoneda
- 6922 Yasushi
- 4863 Yasutani
- 9106 Yatagarasu
- 35076 Yataro
- 12447 Yatescup
- 34644 Yatinchandar
- 2728 Yatskiv
- 4033 Yatsugatake
- 7097 Yatsuka
- 64290 Yaushingtung
- 5887 Yauza
- 9238 Yavapai
- 4072 Yayoi
- 2270 Yazhi
- 166886 Ybl
- 3689 Yeates
- 4661 Yebes
- 27895 Yeduzheng
- 34162 Yegnesh
- 52344 Yehudimenuhin
- 30314 Yelenam
- 577883 Yelenametyolkina
- 110297 Yellowriver
- 48616 Yeminghan
- 9249 Yen
- 15804 Yenisei
- 28942 Yennydieguez
- 34580 Yenpohsun
- 20641 Yenuanchen
- 2956 Yeomans
- 456677 Yepeijian
- 12881 Yepeiyu
- 20134 Yeqisun
- 10280 Yequanzhi
- 990 Yerkes
- 7707 Yes
- 2576 Yesenin
- 34183 Yeshdoctor
- 3241 Yeshuhua
- 34713 Yeşiltaş
- 2843 Yeti
- 38960 Yeungchihung
- 19848 Yeungchuchiu
- 40776 Yeungkwongyu
- 17039 Yeuseyenka
- 5114 Yezo
- 1972 Yi Xing
- 16043 Yichenzhang
- 63156 Yicheon
- 7602 Yidaeam
- 7630 Yidumduma
- 25962 Yifanli
- 20765 Yifeijiao
- 616689 Yihangyiyang
- 23066 Yihedong
- 31969 Yihuachen
- 26620 Yihuali
- 175411 Yilan
- 18887 Yiliuchen
- 27374 Yim
- 23235 Yingfan
- 21817 Yingling
- 18770 Yingqiuqilei
- 11259 Yingtungchen
- 28415 Yingxiong
- 3340 Yinhai
- 729034 Yinqiang
- 21723 Yinyinwu
- 206185 Yip
- 10479 Yiqunchen
- 22553 Yisun
- 72021 Yisunji
- 80801 Yiwu
- 17245 Yixie
- 26618 Yixinli
- 20880 Yiyideng
- 10422 Yizhaohua
- 32107 Ylitalo
- 2846 Ylppö
- 15313 Ynnerman
- 24021 Yocum
- 6243 Yoder
- 20522 Yogeshwar
- 74421 Yogilang
- 27578 Yogisullivan
- 5176 Yoichi
- 52402 Yoichihasegawa
- 8072 Yojikondo
- 13529 Yokaboshi
- 5236 Yoko
- 7136 Yokohasuo
- 11794 Yokokebukawa
- 7287 Yokokurayama
- 6557 Yokonomura
- 35371 Yokonozaki
- 327695 Yokoono
- 7261 Yokootakeo
- 6155 Yokosugano
- 6656 Yokota
- 6649 Yokotatakao
- 18289 Yokoyamakoichi
- 11987 Yonematsu
- 5060 Yoneta
- 6228 Yonezawa
- 37625 Yonezawatatsuki
- 30438 Yongikbyun
- 15596 Yongshiangtham
- 5730 Yonosuke
- 20766 Yoonsoobach
- 3823 Yorii
- 5744 Yorimasa
- 3902 Yoritomo
- 28220 York
- 35976 Yorktown
- 5784 Yoron
- 54509 YORP
- 10547 Yosakoi
- 10405 Yoshiaki
- 34077 Yoshiakifuse
- 3950 Yoshida
- 7351 Yoshidamichi
- 350173 Yoshidanaoki
- 19304 Yoshidaseiko
- 5753 Yoshidatadahiko
- 9220 Yoshidayama
- 15791 Yoshiewatanabe
- 12056 Yoshigeru
- 8904 Yoshihara
- 48756 Yoshiharukuni
- 7408 Yoshihide
- 5915 Yoshihiro
- 7188 Yoshii
- 15906 Yoshikaneda
- 5237 Yoshikawa
- 8102 Yoshikazu
- 15252 Yoshiken
- 9123 Yoshiko
- 43931 Yoshimi
- 8946 Yoshimitsu
- 25088 Yoshimura
- 4574 Yoshinaka
- 5640 Yoshino
- 48408 Yoshinogari
- 4670 Yoshinogawa
- 46608 Yoshinokeiji
- 9073 Yoshinori
- 18840 Yoshioba
- 6199 Yoshiokayayoi
- 30448 Yoshiomoriyama
- 8735 Yoshiosakai
- 9898 Yoshiro
- 7300 Yoshisada
- 26837 Yoshitakaokazaki
- 10568 Yoshitanaka
- 12365 Yoshitoki
- 3733 Yoshitomo
- 3178 Yoshitsune
- 10167 Yoshiwatiso
- 7257 Yoshiya
- 5172 Yoshiyuki
- 2910 Yoshkar-Ola
- 9074 Yosukeyoshida
- 13565 Yotakanashi
- 9784 Yotsubashi
- 11443 Youdale
- 21826 Youjiazhong
- 2165 Young
- 13369 Youngblood
- 28884 Youngjunchoi
- 33685 Younglove
- 28969 Youngminjeongahn
- 32441 Youngrokkim
- 20767 Younkiljung
- 7020 Yourcenar
- 33903 Youssefmoulane
- 29808 Youssoliman
- 7105 Yousyozan
- 7992 Yozan
- 184280 Yperion
- 10120 Ypres
- 2804 Yrjö
- 15703 Yrjölä
- 351 Yrsa
- 15363 Ysaÿe
- 18751 Yualexandrov
- 6541 Yuan
- 263906 Yuanfengfang
- 8117 Yuanlongping
- 214883 Yuanxikun
- 22572 Yuanzhang
- 106817 Yubangtaek
- 10799 Yucatán
- 20769 Yücelkılıç
- 603200 Yuchichung
- 83600 Yuchunshun
- 215458 Yucun
- 7581 Yudovich
- 41740 Yuenkwokyung
- 32622 Yuewaichun
- 10016 Yugan
- 10396 Yugao
- 1554 Yugoslavia
- 9848 Yugra
- 23524 Yuichitsuda
- 56018 Yujawang
- 47077 Yuji
- 9415 Yujiokimura
- 8089 Yukar
- 6913 Yukawa
- 152657 Yukifumi
- 28340 Yukihiro
- 10559 Yukihisa
- 40248 Yukikajiura
- 37392 Yukiniall
- 5513 Yukio
- 5821 Yukiomaeda
- 26794 Yukioniimi
- 20019 Yukiotanaka
- 13627 Yukitamayo
- 55212 Yukitoayatsuji
- 30509 Yukitrippel
- 5855 Yukitsuna
- 10272 Yuko
- 9109 Yukomotizuki
- 19370 Yukyung
- 14960 Yule
- 589360 Yulialinde
- 34555 Yuliamaslova
- 15745 Yuliya
- 31196 Yulong
- 15584 Yumaokamoto
- 12746 Yumeginga
- 7596 Yumi
- 20073 Yumiko
- 15729 Yumikoitahana
- 20770 Yumoto
- 30405 Yunakwon
- 192391 Yunda
- 21447 Yungchieh
- 200578 Yungchuen
- 435728 Yunlin
- 2230 Yunnan
- 805998 Yunon
- 33472 Yunorperalta
- 20853 Yunxiangchu
- 364566 Yurga
- 44570 Yuribeletsky
- 173936 Yuribo
- 315276 Yurigradovsky
- 6942 Yurigulyaev
- 11826 Yurijgromov
- 375832 Yurijmedvedev
- 13146 Yuriko
- 4917 Yurilvovia
- 29547 Yurimazzanti
- 20771 Yurimoto
- 8635 Yuriosipov
- 212924 Yurishevchuk
- 8781 Yurka
- 21818 Yurkanin
- 7558 Yurlov
- 79333 Yusaku
- 185546 Yushan
- 30028 Yushihomma
- 27261 Yushiwang
- 34499 Yusukesakai
- 333033 Yutakahashi
- 158241 Yutonagatomo
- 20204 Yuudurunosato
- 5291 Yuuko
- 5563 Yuuri
- 16790 Yuuzou
- 25903 Yuvalcalev
- 10837 Yuyakekoyake
- 42175 Yuyang
- 20265 Yuyinchen
- 28966 Yuyingshih
- 6009 Yuzuruyoshii
- 1340 Yvette
- 25120 Yvetteleung
- 1301 Yvonne
- 28049 Yvonnealex
- 185312 Yvonnemarschall
- 15115 Yvonneroe
- 9501 Ywain
back to top

== See also ==
- List of minor planet discoverers
- List of observatory codes
- Meanings of minor planet names § Index
