= Devosa =

Devosa may refer to:

- 337 Devosa, a main-belt asteroid
- USS Devosa (AKA-27), an Artemis-class attack cargo ship of the United States Navy
