= 1412 Lagrula =

Asteroid from the inner regions of the asteroid belt

Discovery
- Discovered by: L. Boyer
- Discovery site: Algiers Obs.
- Discovery date: 19 January 1937

Designations
- Named after: Philippe Lagrula (astronomer)
- Alternative designations: 1937 BA · 1929 US; 1962 XM
- Minor planet category: main-belt · Flora

Orbital characteristics
- Epoch 16 February 2017 (JD 2457800.5)
- Uncertainty parameter 0
- Observation arc: 86.64 yr (31,644 days)
- Aphelion: 2.4645 AU
- Perihelion: 1.9648 AU
- Semi-major axis: 2.2147 AU
- Eccentricity: 0.1128
- Orbital period (sidereal): 3.30 yr (1,204 days)
- Mean anomaly: 145.58°
- Mean motion: 0° 17^{m} 56.4^{s} / day
- Inclination: 4.7178°
- Longitude of ascending node: 66.118°
- Argument of perihelion: 14.052°

Physical characteristics
- Dimensions: 7.78±1.36 km 7.806±0.075 km 9.068±0.047 km 23±3 km 23.98 km (calculated)
- Synodic rotation period: 5.882±0.001 h 5.9176±0.0001 h
- Geometric albedo: 0.058 (assumed); 0.06; 0.2378±0.0284; 0.318±0.044; 0.36±0.14
- Spectral type: S
- Absolute magnitude (H): 11.81±0.04 · 12.3 · 12.4 · 12.62 · 12.73±0.75

1412 Lagrula, provisional designation 1937 BA, is an asteroid from the inner regions of the asteroid belt, approximately 7 or 23 kilometers in diameter, depending on the body's divergent reflectivity measurements.

It was discovered on 19 January 1937, by French astronomer Louis Boyer at the North African Algiers Observatory in Algeria. It was later named after French astronomer Philippe Lagrula.

== Classification and orbit ==
Lagrula is a presumed member of the Flora family, a large group of stony S-type asteroids in the inner main-belt. It orbits the Sun at a distance of 2.0–2.5 AU once every 3 years and 4 months (1,204 days). Its orbit has an eccentricity of 0.11 and an inclination of 5° with respect to the ecliptic. First identified as 1929 US at Lowell Observatory in 1929, the body's observation arc was extended by 8 years prior to its official discovery observation at Algiers.

== Physical characteristics ==
=== Photometry ===
During March and April 2013, photometric observations of Lagrula were made over ten nights by Italian astronomer Giovanni Casalnuovo at Eurac Observatory (C62) in Bolzano, Italy. Lightcurve analysis gave a rotation period of 5.9176 hours and a brightness variation of 0.28 magnitude (U=2+). In January 2016, a more refined period of 5.882 hours with an amplitude of 0.44 magnitude was obtained from a bimodal lightcurve by Spanish astronomer group OBAS, Observadores de Asteroides (U=3).

=== Diameter and albedo ===
According to the survey carried out by NASA's Wide-field Infrared Survey Explorer with its subsequent NEOWISE mission, Lagrula measures 7.8 kilometers in diameter, and its surface has an albedo of 0.318 and 0.36, respectively (most recent results only). However, the Collaborative Asteroid Lightcurve Link assumes a carbonaceous albedo of 0.058 and calculates a diameter of 23.98 kilometers, which is in agreement with Giovanni Casalnuovo, who published a diameter of 23±3 and an albedo of 0.06 using an absolute magnitude of 11.81. Casalnuovo assumed a C-type, rather than an S-type, because he found an average V–R color index of 0.37±0.05 magnitude.

== Naming ==
This minor planet was named after French astronomer Joanny-Philippe Lagrula (1870–1941), discoverer of the minor planet 775 Lumière and director of the Quito Astronomical Observatory and Algiers Observatory. Naming citation was neither published in The Names of the Minor Planets nor in the Minor Planet Circulars, but researched and compiled by astronomer and author Lutz D. Schmadel, based on his private communications with his colleges (LDS).
