= 2807 Karl Marx =

Dorian asteroid

Discovery
- Discovered by: L. Chernykh
- Discovery site: Crimean Astrophysical Obs.
- Discovery date: 15 October 1969

Designations
- Named after: Karl Marx (revolutionary socialist)
- Alternative designations: 1969 TH_{6} · 1952 BD_{1} 1974 XF · 1976 GD_{3} A924 BE
- Minor planet category: main-belt · (middle); Dora

Orbital characteristics
- Epoch 4 September 2017 (JD 2458000.5)
- Uncertainty parameter 0
- Observation arc: 93.16 yr (34,025 days)
- Aphelion: 3.2969 AU
- Perihelion: 2.2938 AU
- Semi-major axis: 2.7953 AU
- Eccentricity: 0.1794
- Orbital period (sidereal): 4.67 yr (1,707 days)
- Mean anomaly: 13.095°
- Mean motion: 0° 12^{m} 39.24^{s} / day
- Inclination: 7.8785°
- Longitude of ascending node: 28.449°
- Argument of perihelion: 92.475°

Physical characteristics
- Dimensions: 16.866±0.144 km
- Geometric albedo: 0.057±0.012
- Spectral type: SMASS = C
- Absolute magnitude (H): 13.07

2807 Karl Marx, provisional designation 1969 TH_{6}, is a carbonaceous Dorian asteroid from the central region of the asteroid belt, approximately 17 kilometers in diameter. It was discovered on 15 October 1969, by Russian astronomer Lyudmila Chernykh at the Crimean Astrophysical Observatory in Nauchnyj on the Crimean peninsula. The asteroid was later named for the German philosopher Karl Marx.

== Orbit and classification ==
=== Dora family ===
Karl Marx is a member of the Dora family (512), a well-determined asteroid family of more than 1,200 known members with a carbonaceous composition. The family's namesake is 668 Dora. It is alternatively known as the "Zhongolovich family", named after its presumably largest member 1734 Zhongolovich. The Dora family may also contain a subfamily.

=== Orbit and observation arc ===
It orbits the Sun in the central main-belt at a distance of 2.3–3.3 AU once every 4 years and 8 months (1,707 days). Its orbit has an eccentricity of 0.18 and an inclination of 8° with respect to the ecliptic.

The asteroid was first identified as 1924 BE at Heidelberg Observatory in 1924. Its first used observation is a precovery taken at Palomar Observatory in 1954, extending the body's observation arc by 15 years prior to its official discovery observation at Nauchnyj.

== Physical characteristics ==
In the SMASS classification, Karl Marx is classified as a carbonaceous C-type asteroid. According to the survey carried out by NASA's Wide-field Infrared Survey Explorer with its subsequent NEOWISE mission, Karl Marx measures 16.9 kilometers in diameter and its surface has an albedo of 0.057.

=== Lightcurves ===
As of 2017, no rotational lightcurve of Karl Marx has been obtained. The body's rotation period and shape remains unknown.

== Naming ==
This minor planet was named after German philosopher, economist and revolutionary socialist Karl Marx (1818–1883), student of the theories about society, economics and politics, and author of Das Kapital, the foundational theoretical text of modern communist thought. The official naming citation was published by the Minor Planet Center on 24 July 1983 (M.P.C. 8065).
