= 2940 Bacon =

Carbonaceous main-belt asteroid

Discovery
- Discovered by: C. J. van Houten; I. van Houten-G. Tom Gehrels
- Discovery site: Palomar Obs.
- Discovery date: 24 September 1960

Designations
- Named after: Francis Bacon (English scholar)
- Alternative designations: 3042 P-L · 1981 ER_{3}
- Minor planet category: main-belt · (middle); Dora

Orbital characteristics
- Epoch 4 September 2017 (JD 2458000.5)
- Uncertainty parameter 0
- Observation arc: 56.46 yr (20,621 days)
- Aphelion: 3.4366 AU
- Perihelion: 2.1278 AU
- Semi-major axis: 2.7822 AU
- Eccentricity: 0.2352
- Orbital period (sidereal): 4.64 yr (1,695 days)
- Mean anomaly: 77.051°
- Inclination: 6.4417°
- Longitude of ascending node: 273.76°
- Argument of perihelion: 116.75°

Physical characteristics
- Dimensions: 8.953±0.240 km
- Geometric albedo: 0.055±0.005
- Absolute magnitude (H): 14.3

Bacon (minor planet designation: 2940 Bacon), provisional designation 3042 P-L, is a carbonaceous Dorian asteroid from the central region of the asteroid belt, approximately 9 kilometers in diameter. It was discovered on 24 September 1960, by Ingrid and Cornelis van Houten at Leiden, and Tom Gehrels at Palomar Observatory in California, United States. It was later named after English philosopher and statesman Francis Bacon.

== Orbit and classification ==
Bacon is a member of the Dora family (FIN: 512), a well-established central asteroid family of more than 1,200 carbonaceous asteroids. The family's namesake is 668 Dora. It is alternatively known as the "Zhongolovich family", named after its presumably largest member 1734 Zhongolovich. The Dora family may also contain a subfamily.

It orbits the Sun in the middle main-belt at a distance of 2.1–3.4 AU once every 4 years and 8 months (1,695 days). Its orbit has an eccentricity of 0.24 and an inclination of 6° with respect to the ecliptic. The body's observation arc begins with its official discovery observation at Palomar, as no precoveries were taken, and no prior identifications were made.

=== Palomar–Leiden survey ===
The survey designation "P-L" stands for Palomar–Leiden, named after Palomar Observatory and Leiden Observatory, which collaborated on the fruitful Palomar–Leiden survey in the 1960s. Gehrels used Palomar's Samuel Oschin telescope (also known as the 48-inch Schmidt Telescope), and shipped the photographic plates to Ingrid and Cornelis van Houten at Leiden Observatory where astrometry was carried out. The trio are credited with the discovery of several thousand asteroids.

== Physical characteristics ==
According to the surveys carried out by NASA's Wide-field Infrared Survey Explorer with its subsequent NEOWISE mission, Bacon measures 8.953 kilometers in diameter and its surface has an albedo of 0.055, which is typical for carbonaceous C-type asteroids. It has an absolute magnitude of 14.3.

As of 2017, Bacon's rotation period and shape, as well as its spectral type remains unknown.

== Naming ==
This minor planet was named in honour of English philosopher, statesman, scientist, jurist, orator, and author Sir Francis Bacon (1561–1626). He has been called the father of empiricism and his works established and popularized the scientific method. According to the Baconian theory, he wrote the plays attributed to William Shakespeare. The approved naming citation was published by the Minor Planet Center on 29 September 1985 (M.P.C. 10044).
