= 1851 Lacroute =

Main-belt asteroid

Discovery
- Discovered by: L. Boyer
- Discovery site: Algiers Obs.
- Discovery date: 9 November 1950

Designations
- Named after: Pierre Lacroute (French astronomer)
- Alternative designations: 1950 VA
- Minor planet category: main-belt · (inner)

Orbital characteristics
- Epoch 4 September 2017 (JD 2458000.5)
- Uncertainty parameter 0
- Observation arc: 66.35 yr (24,236 days)
- Aphelion: 3.7003 AU
- Perihelion: 2.5044 AU
- Semi-major axis: 3.1024 AU
- Eccentricity: 0.1927
- Orbital period (sidereal): 5.46 yr (1,996 days)
- Mean anomaly: 85.690°
- Mean motion: 0° 10^{m} 49.44^{s} / day
- Inclination: 1.6660°
- Longitude of ascending node: 24.766°
- Argument of perihelion: 343.20°

Physical characteristics
- Dimensions: 16.89 km (IRAS); 18.158±0.108 km
- Geometric albedo: 0.049±0.007; 0.0745±0.009 (IRAS)
- Absolute magnitude (H): 12.7

1851 Lacroute, provisional designation 1950 VA, is an asteroid from the outer region of the asteroid belt, approximately 17 kilometers in diameter.

It was discovered on 9 November 1950, by French astronomer Louis Boyer at the Algiers Observatory in the capital of Algeria, Northern Africa, and named after French astronomer Pierre Lacroute.

== Orbit and classification ==
Lacroute orbits the Sun in the outer main-belt at a distance of 2.5–3.7 AU once every 5 years and 6 months (1,996 days). Its orbit has an eccentricity of 0.19 and an inclination of 2° with respect to the ecliptic. As no precoveries were taken, and no prior identifications were made, the body's observation arc begins with its official discovery observation in 1950.

== Physical characteristics ==
According to the surveys carried out by the Infrared Astronomical Satellite (IRAS) and NASA's Wide-field Infrared Survey Explorer with its subsequent NEOWISE mission, Lacroute measures 16.9 and 18.2 kilometers in diameter, and its surface has an albedo of 0.049 and 0.074, respectively. As of 2016, the body's spectral type, as well as its rotation period and shape remain unknown.

== Naming ==
This minor planet was named in honor of French astronomer Pierre Lacroute (1906–1993), a known astrometrist, president of IAU's Commission 24 in the 1970s, and director of the Observatory of Strasbourg, instrumental in the establishment of the Stellar Data Center (also see SIMBAD).

Lacroute also made an independent reduction of the astrometric star catalogue AGK3, using a technique involving overlapping photographic plates. The official naming citation was published by the Minor Planet Center on 1 August 1978 (M.P.C. 4419).
