= 1400 Tirela =

Main-belt asteroid

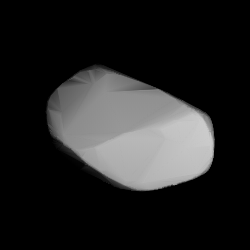
- Modelled shape of Tirela from its lightcurve

Discovery
- Discovered by: L. Boyer
- Discovery site: Algiers Obs.
- Discovery date: 17 November 1936

Designations
- Named after: Charles Tirel (discoverer's friend)
- Alternative designations: 1936 WA · 1930 UQ
- Minor planet category: main-belt · (outer); Tirela

Orbital characteristics
- Epoch 4 September 2017 (JD 2458000.5)
- Uncertainty parameter 0
- Observation arc: 86.96 yr (31,762 days)
- Aphelion: 3.8513 AU
- Perihelion: 2.4001 AU
- Semi-major axis: 3.1257 AU
- Eccentricity: 0.2322
- Orbital period (sidereal): 5.53 yr (2,018 days)
- Mean anomaly: 316.88°
- Mean motion: 0° 10^{m} 42.24^{s} / day
- Inclination: 15.631°
- Longitude of ascending node: 210.10°
- Argument of perihelion: 111.65°

Physical characteristics
- Mean diameter: 14.67±0.62 km; 15.697±0.285 km
- Synodic rotation period: 13.356 h
- Pole ecliptic latitude: (58.0°, −80.0°) (λ_{1}/β_{1}); (297.0°, −41.0°) (λ_{2}/β_{2})
- Geometric albedo: 0.216±0.031; 0.2165±0.0309; 0.227±0.022
- Spectral type: C (assumed)
- Absolute magnitude (H): 11.3 · 11.4 · 11.50

1400 Tirela (provisional designation 1936 WA) is an asteroid and the parent body of the Tirela family, located in the outer regions of the asteroid belt. It was discovered on 17 November 1936, by French astronomer Louis Boyer at the Algiers Observatory in North Africa. The asteroid has a rotation period of 13.4 hours and measures approximately 16 kilometers (9.9 miles) in diameter. It was named after Charles Tirel, a friend of the discoverer.

== Orbit and classification ==
Tirela is the parent body of the Tirela family, a fairly large asteroid family, also known as the Klumpkea family, after its largest member 1040 Klumpkea. It orbits the Sun in the outer main belt at a distance of 2.4–3.9 AU once every 5 years and 6 months (2,018 days). Its orbit has an eccentricity of 0.23 and an inclination of 16° with respect to the ecliptic. The asteroid was first identified as 1930 UQ at Lowell Observatory in October 1930. The body's observation arc also begins at Lowell Observatory, with a precovery taken the night before its first identification.

== Naming ==
This minor planet was named after Charles Tirel a friend of discoverer Louis Boyer- The official naming citation was mentioned in The Names of the Minor Planets by Paul Herget in 1955 (H 127).

== Physical characteristics ==
In both the Tholen- and SMASS-like taxonomy of the Small Solar System Objects Spectroscopic Survey (S3OS2), Tirela is a dark D-type asteroid. Conversely, the overall spectral type of the Tirela family is that of an S-type which agrees with the determined albedo (see below) by WISE and Akari.

=== Rotation period and poles ===
In the early 2000s, a rotational lightcurve of Tirela was obtained from photometric observations by a group of Hungarian astronomers. Lightcurve analysis gave a rotation period of 13.356 hours with a brightness amplitude of 0.55 magnitude (U=2), superseding the result from a previous observation that gave a period of 8 hours. (Note: Lightcurve (not published) on Behrend website from 2001-07-03: rotation period 8 hours with a brightness amplitude of 0.25 mag. Quality code of 2. Summary figures for (1400) Tirela at LCDB) A 2016-published lightcurve, using modeled photometric data from the Lowell Photometric Database, gave a concurring sidereal period of 13.35384±0.00001 hours, as well as two spin axis of (58.0°, −80.0°) and (297.0°, −41.0°) in ecliptic coordinates (λ, β).

=== Diameter and albedo ===
According to the surveys carried out by the Japanese Akari satellite and the NEOWISE mission of NASA's WISE telescope, Tirela measures between 14.67 and 15.697 kilometers in diameter and its surface has an albedo between 0.216 and 0.227. The Collaborative Asteroid Lightcurve Link assumes a standard albedo for carbonaceous asteroids of 0.057 and calculates a diameter of 29.21 kilometers based on an absolute magnitude of 11.4.
