= 1416 Renauxa =

Eon asteroid from the outer regions of the asteroid belt

Discovery
- Discovered by: L. Boyer
- Discovery site: Algiers Obs.
- Discovery date: 4 March 1937

Designations
- Named after: J. Renaux (astronomer at the discovering observatory)
- Alternative designations: 1937 EC · 1930 XE; A914 TB · A919 SC
- Minor planet category: main-belt · (outer); Eos

Orbital characteristics
- Epoch 4 September 2017 (JD 2458000.5)
- Uncertainty parameter 0
- Observation arc: 102.64 yr (37,489 days)
- Aphelion: 3.3394 AU
- Perihelion: 2.6961 AU
- Semi-major axis: 3.0178 AU
- Eccentricity: 0.1066
- Orbital period (sidereal): 5.24 yr (1,915 days)
- Mean anomaly: 194.18°
- Mean motion: 0° 11^{m} 16.8^{s} / day
- Inclination: 10.033°
- Longitude of ascending node: 352.60°
- Argument of perihelion: 66.106°

Physical characteristics
- Dimensions: 22.24±0.95 km 27.552±0.177 km 28.75 km (derived); 28.95±2.7 km 30.023±0.249 km 33.35±8.99 km 33.50±13.88 km 34.42±0.90 km
- Synodic rotation period: 4.2 h (poor) (Note: Iowa-(2011) web: rotation period 4.2 hours. Quality code of 1. Summary figures at the LCDB); 4.3 h (superseded); 8.700±0.004 h
- Geometric albedo: 0.09±0.06; 0.09±0.07; 0.112±0.006; 0.1122 (derived); 0.1357±0.0159; 0.1459±0.031; 0.205±0.028; 0.212±0.009
- Spectral type: Tholen = S · K B–V = 0.790; U–B = 0.410
- Absolute magnitude (H): 10.40 · 10.60 · 10.7 · 10.75

1416 Renauxa, provisional designation 1937 EC, is an Eon asteroid from the outer regions of the asteroid belt, approximately 29 kilometers in diameter. It was discovered on 4 March 1937, by French astronomer Louis Boyer at the Algiers Observatory in Algeria, North Africa. It was named after Joseph Renaux, an astronomer at the discovering observatory.

== Orbit and classification ==
Renauxa is a member the Eos family (606), the largest asteroid family in the outer main belt consisting of nearly 10,000 asteroids. It orbits the Sun at a distance of 2.7–3.3 AU once every 5 years and 3 months (1,915 days). Its orbit has an eccentricity of 0.11 and an inclination of 10° with respect to the ecliptic.

The asteroid was first identified as A914 TB at Heidelberg Observatory in October 1914, where its observation arc begins with its identification as 1919 SC in September 1919, more than 17 years prior to its official discovery observation at Algiers.

== Physical characteristics ==
Renauxa has been characterized as a K-type asteroid, one of the first of such type ever identified and in line with the overall spectral type for members of the Eos family. In the Tholen classification, it is classified as an S-type asteroid. This is a known misclassification as S- and K-types are identical in the visual part of the spectrum.

=== Rotation period ===
In December 2009, a rotational lightcurve of Renauxa was obtained from photometric observations by Richard Durkee at the S.O.S. Observatory (H39). Lightcurve analysis gave a well-defined rotation period of 8.700 hours with a low brightness variation of 0.11 magnitude (U=3), superseding previous observation that gave approximately half the period solution (U=1/2). A low brightness amplitude is typical for a spherical rather than elongated shape.

=== Diameter and albedo ===
According to the surveys carried out by the Infrared Astronomical Satellite IRAS, the Japanese Akari satellite and the NEOWISE mission of NASA's Wide-field Infrared Survey Explorer, Renauxa measures between 22.24 and 34.42 kilometers in diameter and its surface has an albedo between 0.09 and 0.212.

The Collaborative Asteroid Lightcurve Link derives an albedo of 0.1122 and a diameter of 28.75 kilometers based on an absolute magnitude of 10.7.

== Naming ==
This minor planet was named after P. Renaux, a French astronomer and assistant at the discovering Algiers Observatory. The official naming citation was mentioned in The Names of the Minor Planets by Paul Herget in 1955 (H 128).
