= Pierre Lacroute =

French astrophysicist (1906–1993)

- Born: Alphonse Marie Pierre Lacroute; January 12, 1906; Dijon
- Died: January 14, 1993 (aged 87); La Verrière
- Awards: Prix Jules Janssen (1975)
- Scientific career
- Fields: Astronomy and astrometry
- Institutions: Toulouse Observatory; Observatory of Strasbourg

Pierre Lacroute (1906–1993), was a French astrophysicist and pioneer of astrometry using satellite experiments. He is known as the first proposer of the Hipparcos space experiment.

== Education and career ==
After graduating in physics at École normale supérieure, Pierre Lacroute received a doctorate in physical sciences from the Faculty of Sciences of the University of Paris in 1934. His Ph.D. thesis entitled Effet Zeeman du brome et de l'iode (Zeeman effect of bromine and of iodine) was directed by Eugène Bloch.

From 1935 to 1946, Lacroute was an astronomer at the Toulouse Observatory where he set up an astrophysics department specializing in spectroscopic observation of stars. From 1946 until his retirement in 1976, he was a professor of astronomy at the Faculty of Sciences of Strasbourg and served as director of the Observatory of Strasbourg. He led the observatory's involvement in the AGK3R program. Since its creation in 1972 with the support of Jean Delhaye, then director of the National Institute of Astronomy and Geophysics, the observatory has housed the Centre de Données astronomiques de Strasbourg (Strasbourg Astronomical Data Center), world database of astronomical knowledge.

== Astrometry with artificial satellites ==
In the mid-1960s, Lacroute and Pierre Bacchus studied the problem of equipping a satellite with a telescope in order to overcome observational problems caused by planet Earth's atmosphere. In 1967, Pierre Lacroute proposed to the Centre national d'études spatiales (CNES, National Centre for Space Studies), to equip an artificial satellite with a telescope in order to obtain a star catalogue more accurate than could be established using terrestrial telescopes. The CNES agreed to develop the project but in view of its cost decided to move towards multinational financing. After a feasibility study carried out in 1977, the European Space Agency finally agreed in 1980 to finance the mission. He was thus the initiator of the Hipparcos satellite project launched by an Ariane IV rocket in 1989. The mission of this satellite was to measure the parallaxes of stars.

== Awards and honours ==
The asteroid 1851 Lacroute, discovered by Louis Boyer in 1950, is named in his honour. Lacroute was awarded in 1975 Prix Jules Janssen of the Société astronomique de France and in 1992 the Prix André Lallemand of the Académie des sciences. He was in 1986 the president of the Académie des Sciences, Arts et Belles-Lettres de Dijon. A street in Dijon, his native city, is named in his honour.

== Selected publications ==
- Lacroute, P. (1975). "Space astrometry projects". ESRO Space Astrometry: 5–30. Bibcode:1975spam.rept....5L.
- Lacroute, P. (1982). "The space astrometry project: history, technical evolution and future prospects". The Scientific Aspects of the Hipparcos Space Astrometry Mission. 177: 3–12. Bibcode:1982ESASP.177....3L.
