= 1296 Andrée =

Main-belt asteroid

Discovery
- Discovered by: L. Boyer
- Discovery site: Algiers Obs.
- Discovery date: 25 November 1933

Designations
- Named after: Andrée (discoverer's niece)
- Alternative designations: 1933 WE · 1925 TA; 1929 TH · 1931 HF
- Minor planet category: main-belt · Nysa–Polana complex

Orbital characteristics
- Epoch 16 February 2017 (JD 2457800.5)
- Uncertainty parameter 0
- Observation arc: 91.41 yr (33,386 days)
- Aphelion: 2.7613 AU
- Perihelion: 2.0737 AU
- Semi-major axis: 2.4175 AU
- Eccentricity: 0.1422
- Orbital period (sidereal): 3.76 yr (1,373 days)
- Mean anomaly: 21.785°
- Mean motion: 0° 15^{m} 43.92^{s} / day
- Inclination: 4.1067°
- Longitude of ascending node: 227.00°
- Argument of perihelion: 236.76°

Physical characteristics
- Dimensions: 20.66±4.94 km 22.20±5.74 km 25.07 km (derived); 25.25±1.6 km (IRAS:24); 25.52±0.36 km 26.298±0.082 km 28.045±0.370 km
- Synodic rotation period: 5.178±0.006 h 5.18366±0.00007 h
- Geometric albedo: 0.06±0.06; 0.0678±0.0044; 0.07±0.03; 0.072±0.004; 0.0849 (derived); 0.1209±0.017 (IRAS:24); 0.121±0.004
- Spectral type: S
- Absolute magnitude (H): 10.9 · 11.3 · 11.70 · 11.76 · 11.8 · 11.94±0.80

1296 Andrée, provisional designation 1933 WE, is a stony asteroid from the inner regions of the asteroid belt, approximately 25 kilometers in diameter. It was discovered on 25 November 1933, by French astronomer Louis Boyer at the North African Algiers Observatory, Algeria, and named after the discoverer's niece.

== Orbit and classification ==
Andrée is a member of the Nysa–Polana complex, a collection of overlapping asteroid families. It orbits the Sun at a distance of 2.1–2.8 AU once every 3 years and 9 months (1,373 days). Its orbit has an eccentricity of 0.14 and an inclination of 4° with respect to the ecliptic. It was first identified as 1925 TA at Heidelberg Observatory in 1925, extending the body's observation arc by 8 years prior to its official discovery observation.

== Lightcurves ==
In January 2002, a rotational lightcurve of Andrée was obtained from photometric observations by French amateur astronomer Laurent Bernasconi. Lightcurve analysis gave a well-defined rotation period of 5.178 hours with a brightness variation of 0.27 magnitude (U=3). In October 2004, a concurring lightcurve with a period of 5.18366 hours and an amplitude of 0.23 was obtained by French astronomers Cyril Cavadore and Pierre Antonini (U=3).

== Diameter and albedo ==
According to the surveys carried out by the Infrared Astronomical Satellite IRAS, the Japanese Akari satellite, and NASA's Wide-field Infrared Survey Explorer with its subsequent NEOWISE mission, Andrée measures between 20.66 and 28.045 kilometers in diameter, and its surface has an albedo of between 0.06 and 0.121. The Collaborative Asteroid Lightcurve Link derives an albedo of 0.0849 and a diameter of 25.07 kilometers with an absolute magnitude of 11.3.

== Naming ==
This minor planet was named by the discoverer in honor of his niece, Andrée. Naming citation was first published by Paul Herget in The Names of the Minor Planets in 1955 (H 118).
