= 1040 Klumpkea =

Main-belt asteroid

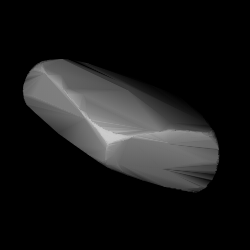
- Shape model of Klumpkea from its lightcurve

Discovery
- Discovered by: B. Jekhovsky
- Discovery site: Algiers Obs.
- Discovery date: 20 January 1925

Designations
- Named after: Dorothea Klumpke (American astronomer)
- Alternative designations: 1925 BD · 1930 DC_{1} 1936 BB
- Minor planet category: main-belt · (outer); Tirela

Orbital characteristics
- Epoch 23 March 2018 (JD 2458200.5)
- Uncertainty parameter 0
- Observation arc: 93.10 yr (34,005 d)
- Aphelion: 3.7117 AU
- Perihelion: 2.5142 AU
- Semi-major axis: 3.1129 AU
- Eccentricity: 0.1923
- Orbital period (sidereal): 5.49 yr (2,006 d)
- Mean anomaly: 4.1328°
- Mean motion: 0° 10^{m} 46.2^{s} / day
- Inclination: 16.688°
- Longitude of ascending node: 280.17°
- Argument of perihelion: 158.00°

Physical characteristics
- Mean diameter: 22.340±0.175 km 22.669±0.304 km 23.13±0.38 km 34.98±4.3 km
- Synodic rotation period: 59.2±0.1 h
- Geometric albedo: 0.0630; 0.237; 0.2387; 0.245
- Spectral type: C (assumed); S (possible)
- Absolute magnitude (H): 10.40; 10.5; 10.9

1040 Klumpkea, provisional designation 1925 BD, is a Tirela asteroid from the outer regions of the asteroid belt, approximately 23 kilometers (14 miles) in diameter. It was discovered on 20 January 1925, by Russian–French astronomer Benjamin Jekhowsky at the Algiers Observatory in North Africa. This highly elongated asteroid is the largest member of the stony Tirela family – also known as the Klumpkea family – and has a longer than average rotation period of 59.2 hours. It was named after American astronomer Dorothea Klumpke.

== Orbit and classification ==
Klumpkea is the largest member of the Tirela family (612), a large asteroid family of more than a thousand members which has been further divided into 8 different subclusters. The family is named after 1400 Tirela. Alternatively it is also known as the Klumpkea family by Milani and Knežević.

It orbits the Sun in the outer asteroid belt at a distance of 2.5–3.7 AU once every 5 years and 6 months (2,006 days; semi-major axis of 3.11 AU). Its orbit has an eccentricity of 0.19 and an inclination of 17° with respect to the ecliptic. The body's observation arc begins at Algiers on its official discovery observation in January 1925.

== Naming ==
This asteroid was named after American astronomer Dorothea Klumpke (1861–1943), spouse of Welsh astronomer Isaac Roberts (1829–1904). Dorothea Klumpke was the first woman to receive the degree of Doctor of Mathematical Sciences at the Sorbonne University in Paris, France. The official naming citation was mentioned in The Names of the Minor Planets by Paul Herget in 1955 (H99). The asteroid 339 Dorothea has also been named in her honor by its discoverer Max Wolf.

== Physical characteristics ==
Klumpkea's spectral type is uncertain. Although the overall spectral type of the Tirela/Klumpkea family is that of a stony S-type, which agrees with observations by the WISE/Akari surveys, the Collaborative Asteroid Lightcurve Link (CALL) assumes it to be a carbonaceous C-type asteroid, based on the low albedo measured by SIMPS (see below).

=== Rotation period and pole ===
In February 2002, a rotational lightcurve of Klumpkea was obtained from seven consecutive nights of photometric observations by Robert Stephens at his Santana Observatory (646) in California. Lightcurve analysis was difficult and only gave a provisional rotation period of 59.2±0.1 hours with a high brightness amplitude of 0.77 magnitude (U=2), indicative of an elongated shape.

In 2016, a modeled lightcurve gave a concurring sidereal period of 56.588±0.003 hours using data from the Uppsala Asteroid Photometric Catalogue, the Palomar Transient Factory survey, and individual observers (such as above), as well as sparse-in-time photometry from the NOFS, the Catalina Sky Survey, and the La Palma surveys (950). The study also determined a spin axis for Klumpkea of (172.0°, 48.0°) in ecliptic coordinates (λ, β).

=== Diameter and albedo ===
According to the surveys carried out by the Infrared Astronomical Satellite IRAS, the Japanese Akari satellite and the NEOWISE mission of NASA's Wide-field Infrared Survey Explorer, Klumpkea measures between 22.34 and 34.98 kilometers in diameter and its surface has an albedo between 0.063 and 0.245. CALL assumes a carbonaceous standard albedo of 0.057 and calculates a diameter of 44.22 kilometers based on an absolute magnitude of 10.5.
