= 1212 Francette =

Hildian asteroid

Discovery
- Discovered by: L. Boyer
- Discovery site: Algiers Obs.
- Discovery date: 3 December 1931

Designations
- Named after: Francette Boyer (discoverer's wife)
- Alternative designations: 1931 XC · 1949 HB_{1} 1949 HZ · 1965 JB; A918 KA
- Minor planet category: main-belt · (outer); Hilda

Orbital characteristics
- Epoch 4 September 2017 (JD 2458000.5)
- Uncertainty parameter 0
- Observation arc: 85.98 yr (31,406 days)
- Aphelion: 4.7109 AU
- Perihelion: 3.1972 AU
- Semi-major axis: 3.9541 AU
- Eccentricity: 0.1914
- Orbital period (sidereal): 7.86 yr (2,872 days)
- Mean anomaly: 282.89°
- Mean motion: 0° 7^{m} 31.44^{s} / day
- Inclination: 7.5898°
- Longitude of ascending node: 149.58°
- Argument of perihelion: 348.23°
- Jupiter MOID: 0.3433 AU

Physical characteristics
- Dimensions: 76.395±0.155 km 82.13±3.2 km 85.81±2.18 km
- Synodic rotation period: 16 h (poor); 22.433±0.007 h (Note: Lightcurve plot of (1212) Francette by Warner, Stephens and Coley at the CS3 from 5 July to 2 August 2016 rotation period 22.433±0.007 hours and an amplitude of 0.13 mag. Quality code of 3-. Summary figures at the LCDB)
- Geometric albedo: 0.037±0.002; 0.0400±0.003; 0.040±0.007; 0.046±0.007
- Spectral type: Tholen = P · P SMASS = X B–V = 0.693; U–B = 0.215
- Absolute magnitude (H): 9.54 · 9.62±0.23

1212 Francette (provisional designation 1931 XC) is a dark Hildian asteroid from the outermost regions of the asteroid belt, approximately 82 kilometers in diameter. It was discovered on 3 December 1931, by French astronomer Louis Boyer at the Algiers Observatory in Algeria, North Africa, who named it after his wife Francette Boyer.

== Orbit and classification ==
Francette is the second largest member of the small Hilda family (001), an asteroid family within the dynamical Hilda group, that stays in an orbital resonance with the gas giant Jupiter. It orbits the Sun in the outermost asteroid belt at a distance of 3.2–4.7 AU once every 7 years and 10 months (2,872 days; semi-major axis of 3.95 AU). Its orbit has an eccentricity of 0.19 and an inclination of 8° with respect to the ecliptic.

The asteroid was first observed as A918 KA at Simeiz Observatory in May 1918. The body's observation arc begins at Algiers with its official discovery observation.

== Physical characteristics ==
In the Tholen classification, Francette is a primitive P-type asteroid. In the SMASS classification it is an X-type asteroid. The Wide-field Infrared Survey Explorer (WISE) also characterizes Francette as a dark P-type, while the overall spectral type for members of the Hilda family is typically that of a carbonaceous C-type.

=== Rotation period ===
In July 2016, a rotational lightcurve of Francette was obtained from photometric observations by American astronomers Brian Warner, Robert Stephens and Dan Coley at the Center for Solar System Studies (U80–82) in California. Lightcurve analysis gave a rotation period of 22.433 hours with a brightness variation of 0.13 magnitude (U=2/3-), superseding a period of 16 hours, previously measured in the 1970s.

=== Diameter and albedo ===
According to the surveys carried out by the Infrared Astronomical Satellite IRAS, the Japanese Akari satellite and the NEOWISE mission of NASA's WISE telescope, Francette measures between 76.395 and 85.81 kilometers in diameter and its surface has an albedo between 0.037 and 0.046.

The Collaborative Asteroid Lightcurve Link adopts the results obtained by IRAS, that is, an albedo of 0.0400 and a diameter of 82.13 kilometers based on an absolute magnitude of 9.54.

== Naming ==
This minor planet was named by the discoverer after his wife, Francette Boyer. The official naming citation was mentioned in The Names of the Minor Planets by Paul Herget in 1955 (H 112).
