= 1597 Laugier =

Main-belt asteroid

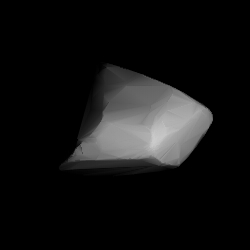
- Shape model of Laugier from its lightcurve

Discovery
- Discovered by: L. Boyer
- Discovery site: Algiers Obs.
- Discovery date: 7 March 1949

Designations
- Named after: Marguerite Laugier (French astronomer)
- Alternative designations: 1949 EB
- Minor planet category: main-belt · (outer)

Orbital characteristics
- Epoch 4 September 2017 (JD 2458000.5)
- Uncertainty parameter 0
- Observation arc: 68.01 yr (24,840 days)
- Aphelion: 3.1024 AU
- Perihelion: 2.5869 AU
- Semi-major axis: 2.8446 AU
- Eccentricity: 0.0906
- Orbital period (sidereal): 4.80 yr (1,752 days)
- Mean anomaly: 67.764°
- Mean motion: 0° 12^{m} 19.44^{s} / day
- Inclination: 11.812°
- Longitude of ascending node: 158.63°
- Argument of perihelion: 52.042°

Physical characteristics
- Dimensions: 12.885±0.169; 24.30 km (calculated)
- Synodic rotation period: 8.0199 h 8.02272 h
- Geometric albedo: 0.057 (assumed); 0.244±0.033
- Spectral type: C
- Absolute magnitude (H): 11.7 · 11.8

1597 Laugier, provisional designation 1949 EB, is an asteroid from the outer region of the asteroid belt, approximately 20 kilometers in diameter. It was discovered on 7 March 1949, by French astronomer Louis Boyer at the north African Algiers Observatory in Algeria. It was later named after French astronomer Marguerite Laugier.

== Orbit and classification ==
This asteroid orbits the Sun in the outer main-belt at a distance of 2.6–3.1 AU once every 4 years and 10 months (1,752 days). Its orbit has an eccentricity of 0.09 and an inclination of 12° with respect to the ecliptic. As no precoveries were taken and no prior identifications were made, Laugier's observation arc begins with its official discovery observation in 1949.

== Physical characteristics ==
Laugier is a presumed C-type asteroid

=== Lightcurves ===
A rotational lightcurve for this asteroid from an unpublished source at the Asteroid Light Curve Database gave a well-defined rotation period of 8.020 hours with a brightness amplitude between 0.68 and 0.71 in magnitude (U=3). A similar period of 8.023 hours was previously obtained from remodeled data of the Lowell photometric database in March 2016.

=== Diameter and albedo ===
According to the survey carried out by NASA's Wide-field Infrared Survey Explorer with its subsequent NEOWISE mission, Laugier measures 12.9 kilometers in diameter and its surface has an albedo of 0.244, while the Collaborative Asteroid Lightcurve Link assumes a standard albedo for carbonaceous asteroids of 0.057, and calculates a diameter of 24.3 kilometers based on an absolute magnitude of 11.8.

== Naming ==
This minor planet was named after French astronomer and asteroid discoverer Marguerite Laugier (1896–1976). The official naming citation was published by the Minor Planet Center on 1 August 1978 (M.P.C. 4418).
