= 1380 Volodia =

Main-belt asteroid

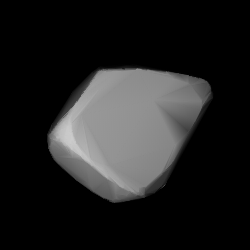
- Modelled shape of Volodia from its lightcurve

Discovery
- Discovered by: L. Boyer
- Discovery site: Algiers Obs.
- Discovery date: 16 March 1936

Designations
- Named after: Vladimir Vesselovsky (newborn on discovery)
- Alternative designations: 1936 FM
- Minor planet category: main-belt · (outer); background

Orbital characteristics
- Epoch 16 February 2017 (JD 2457800.5)
- Uncertainty parameter 0
- Observation arc: 80.65 yr (29,456 days)
- Aphelion: 3.4753 AU
- Perihelion: 2.8314 AU
- Semi-major axis: 3.1533 AU
- Eccentricity: 0.1021
- Orbital period (sidereal): 5.60 yr (2,045 days)
- Mean anomaly: 124.10°
- Mean motion: 0° 10^{m} 33.6^{s} / day
- Inclination: 10.408°
- Longitude of ascending node: 359.07°
- Argument of perihelion: 247.31°

Physical characteristics
- Mean diameter: 21.188±0.289 km 21.76±1.03 km 23.266±0.190 km
- Synodic rotation period: 8 h
- Geometric albedo: 0.0749±0.0148; 0.078±0.018; 0.090±0.017
- Spectral type: D (SDSS-MOC)
- Absolute magnitude (H): 11.6 · 11.70 · 11.8

1380 Volodia (prov. designation: 1936 FM) is a carbonaceous background asteroid from the outer region of the asteroid belt. It was discovered on 16 March 1936, by French astronomer Louis Boyer at the North African Algiers Observatory in Algeria. Five nights later, Volodia was independently discovered by Eugène Delporte at Uccle in Belgium. The dark D-type asteroid has a rotation period of 8 hours and measures approximately 22 kilometers (14 miles) in diameter.

== Orbit and classification ==
This C-type asteroid orbits the Sun at a distance of 2.8–3.5 AU once every 5 years and 7 months (2,045 days). Its orbit has an eccentricity of 0.10 and an inclination of 10° with respect to the ecliptic. Volodia's observation arc begins with its official discovery at Johannesburg, as no precoveries were taken, and no prior identifications were made.

== Naming ==
This minor planet is named for Russian Vladimir Vesselovsky (born 1936), who was born on the night of the asteroid's discovery. "Volodia" is the diminutive of "Vladimir". In 1955, its naming citation was first published by Paul Herget in The Names of the Minor Planets (H 125).

== Physical characteristics ==
In the SDSS-based taxonomy, Volodia is a dark D-type asteroid, which is common in the outer main-belt and among the Jupiter trojan population.

=== Rotation period ===
In April 2008, a fragmentary light-curve of Volodia was obtained from photometric observations by astronomer Eric Barbotin. Light-curve analysis gave a tentative rotation period of 8 hours with a change in brightness of 0.15 magnitude (U=1+).

=== Diameter and albedo ===
According to the survey carried out by NASA's Wide-field Infrared Survey Explorer with its subsequent NEOWISE mission, Volodia measures between 21.76 and 23.27 kilometers in diameter, and its surface has an albedo between 0.074 and 0.090. The Collaborative Asteroid Lightcurve Link assumes an albedo of 0.058 and calculates a diameter of 24.09 kilometers based on an absolute magnitude of 11.8.
