= 1574 Meyer =

Main-belt asteroid

Discovery
- Discovered by: L. Boyer
- Discovery site: Algiers Obs.
- Discovery date: 22 March 1949

Designations
- Named after: Georges Meyer (astronomer, director)
- Alternative designations: 1949 FD · 1930 KE; 1935 CW
- Minor planet category: main-belt · (outer)

Orbital characteristics
- Epoch 4 September 2017 (JD 2458000.5)
- Uncertainty parameter 0
- Observation arc: 87.03 yr (31,786 days)
- Aphelion: 3.6602 AU
- Perihelion: 3.4133 AU
- Semi-major axis: 3.5368 AU
- Eccentricity: 0.0349
- Orbital period (sidereal): 6.65 yr (2,429 days)
- Mean anomaly: 137.01°
- Mean motion: 0° 8^{m} 53.52^{s} / day
- Inclination: 14.479°
- Longitude of ascending node: 245.64°
- Argument of perihelion: 262.24°

Physical characteristics
- Dimensions: 57.785±0.435 km 58.88 km (derived); 60.82±1.30 km 69.966±3.256 km
- Synodic rotation period: 12.64±0.05 h
- Geometric albedo: 0.0274±0.0105; 0.036±0.002; 0.042±0.011; 0.0559 (derived)
- Spectral type: C
- Absolute magnitude (H): 9.87±0.16 · 9.9 · 10.3

1574 Meyer, provisional designation 1949 FD, is a carbonaceous asteroid from the outer region of the asteroid belt, approximately 59 kilometers in diameter. It was discovered on 22 March 1949, by French astronomer Louis Boyer at Algiers Observatory in Algeria, northern Africa. It was named after French astronomer M. Georges Meyer.

== Orbit and classification ==
The C-type asteroid orbits the Sun in the outer main-belt at a distance of 3.4–3.7 AU once every 6 years and 8 months (2,429 days). It is a member of the Cybele group, with an orbital eccentricity of 0.04 and an inclination of 14° with respect to the ecliptic. First identified as 1930 KE at Johannesburg Observatory, Meyer's observation arc was extended by 19 years prior to its official discovery observation at Algiers. On 10 September 1998, Meyer occulted PPM 172432.

== Lightcurve ==
In March 2009, a rotational lightcurve of Meyer was obtained from photometric observations by Landry Carbo at the Oakley Southern Sky Observatory in Australia. The lightcurve analysis gave a rotation period of 12.64 hours with a brightness variation of 0.12 magnitude (U=2).

== Diameter and albedo ==
According to the space-based surveys carried out by the Japanese Akari satellite and NASA's Wide-field Infrared Survey Explorer with its subsequent NEOWISE mission, Meyer measures between 57.78 and 69.97 kilometers in diameter, and its surface has an albedo between 0.027 and 0.042. The Collaborative Asteroid Lightcurve Link derives an albedo of 0.0559 and calculates a diameter of 58.88 kilometers with an absolute magnitude of 9.9.

== Naming ==
This minor planet was named for French astronomer M. Georges Meyer (born 1894), director of the discovering Algiers Observatory. The official naming citation was published by the Minor Planet Center in November 1952 (M.P.C. 837).
