= Safara =

Safara may refer to:

- 1364 Safara, a minor planet
- Safara Monastery or Sapara Monastery, a religious monastery in the Republic of Georgia
- Freguesia de Safara, civil parish in Portugal
