= 1392 Pierre =

Main-belt asteroid

Discovery
- Discovered by: L. Boyer
- Discovery site: Algiers Obs.
- Discovery date: 16 March 1936

Designations
- Named after: Pierre (discoverer's nephew)
- Alternative designations: 1936 FO · 1938 SZ; 1955 TZ · 1959 SH; A917 UB
- Minor planet category: main-belt · (middle); Eunomia · background

Orbital characteristics
- Epoch 4 September 2017 (JD 2458000.5)
- Uncertainty parameter 0
- Observation arc: 81.30 yr (29,695 days)
- Aphelion: 3.1355 AU
- Perihelion: 2.0788 AU
- Semi-major axis: 2.6071 AU
- Eccentricity: 0.2026
- Orbital period (sidereal): 4.21 yr (1,538 days)
- Mean anomaly: 244.35°
- Mean motion: 0° 14^{m} 2.76^{s} / day
- Inclination: 12.263°
- Longitude of ascending node: 358.24°
- Argument of perihelion: 44.290°

Physical characteristics
- Mean diameter: 26.16±0.34 km 26.44±1.6 km 27.02±5.29 km 28.94±8.81 km
- Synodic rotation period: 18 h
- Geometric albedo: 0.04±0.01; 0.04±0.02; 0.0519±0.007; 0.054±0.002
- Spectral type: Tholen = DX · C B–V = 0.757; U–B = 0.258
- Absolute magnitude (H): 11.72; 11.9

1392 Pierre, provisional designation 1936 FO, is a dark, dynamical Eunomian asteroid from the central regions of the asteroid belt, approximately 26 kilometers (16 mi) in diameter. It was discovered on 16 March 1936, by astronomer Louis Boyer at the Algiers Observatory in Algeria, North Africa. The asteroid was named after the discoverer's nephew, Pierre.

== Orbit and classification ==
Pierre is a dynamical member of the Eunomia family (502), a prominent family of stony asteroids and the largest one in the intermediate main belt with more than 5,000 members. Pierre's spectral type is different from that of the Eunomia family (see below) and possibly an interloper rather than a true family member. When applying the hierarchical clustering method to its proper orbital elements, Pierre is a non-family asteroid of the main belt's background population.

It orbits the Sun in the central main-belt at a distance of 2.1–3.1 AU once every 4 years and 3 months (1,538 days). Its orbit has an eccentricity of 0.20 and an inclination of 12° with respect to the ecliptic. The asteroid was first observed as A917 UB at Simeiz Observatory in October 1917. The body's observation arc begins with its official discovery observation at Algiers in March 1936.

== Naming ==
This minor planet was named after Pierre, a nephew of the discoverer Louis Boyer. The official naming citation was mentioned in The Names of the Minor Planets by Paul Herget in 1955 (H 126).

== Physical characteristics ==
Pierre has been characterized as a carbonaceous C-type asteroid by Pan-STARRS photometric survey. In the Tholen classification, the asteroid's spectral type is ambiguous, closest to a dark D-type and somewhat similar to a generic X-type asteroid. Conversely, the Eunomia family consists of S-type asteroids.

=== Rotation period ===
In August 1984, a first rotational lightcurve of Pierre was obtained from photometric observations with the ESO 1-metre telescope at the La Silla Observatory in Chile. Lightcurve analysis gave a rotation period of 18 hours with a brightness variation of 0.09 magnitude (U=2). A poorly rated lightcurve by Pierre Antonini in January 2007, gave a period of 24 hours with an amplitude of 0.05 magnitude.

=== Diameter and albedo ===
According to the surveys carried out by the Infrared Astronomical Satellite IRAS, the Japanese Akari satellite and the NEOWISE mission of NASA's Wide-field Infrared Survey Explorer, Pierre measures between 26.16 and 28.94 kilometers in diameter and its surface has an albedo between 0.04 and 0.054. The Collaborative Asteroid Lightcurve Link adopts the results obtained by IRAS, that is, an albedo of 0.0519 and a diameter of 26.44 kilometers based on an absolute magnitude of 11.72.
