= 1364 Safara =

Main-belt asteroid

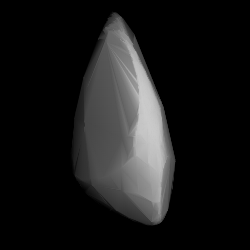
- Modelled shape of Safara from its lightcurve

Discovery
- Discovered by: L. Boyer
- Discovery site: Algiers Obs.
- Discovery date: 18 November 1935

Designations
- Named after: André Safar (discoverer's acquaintance)
- Alternative designations: 1935 VB · 1932 EK
- Minor planet category: main-belt · (outer) · Eos

Orbital characteristics
- Epoch 4 September 2017 (JD 2458000.5)
- Uncertainty parameter 0
- Observation arc: 85.64 yr (31,279 days)
- Aphelion: 3.2114 AU
- Perihelion: 2.8133 AU
- Semi-major axis: 3.0124 AU
- Eccentricity: 0.0661
- Orbital period (sidereal): 5.23 yr (1,910 days)
- Mean anomaly: 8.7502°
- Mean motion: 0° 11^{m} 18.6^{s} / day
- Inclination: 11.488°
- Longitude of ascending node: 63.986°
- Argument of perihelion: 220.38°

Physical characteristics
- Dimensions: 21.197±0.201 km 21.508±0.266 km 24.35±0.47 km 25.73 km (calculated); 32.63±0.46 km
- Synodic rotation period: 7.14908±0.0004 h 7.25±0.05 h (Note: Lightcurve plot of 1364 Safara, Palmer Divide Observatory, Brian D. Warner (2010) Summary figures at the LCDB)
- Geometric albedo: 0.087±0.012; 0.14 (assumed); 0.173±0.007; 0.2231±0.0149
- Spectral type: L · S (assumed)
- Absolute magnitude (H): 10.60 · 10.64±0.19 · 10.70

1364 Safara, incorrectly designated 1935 VB, is an Eoan asteroid from the outer regions of the asteroid belt, approximately 25 kilometers in diameter. It was discovered on 18 November 1935, by French astronomer Louis Boyer at the Algiers Observatory in Algeria, North Africa. The asteroid should have been designated 1935 WB, as the letter "V" only covers discoveries made during 1–15 November. It was named after André Safar, presumably an acquaintance of the discoverer from Algiers.

== Orbit and classification ==
Safara is a member the Eos family (606), the largest asteroid family of the outer main belt consisting of nearly 10,000 asteroids. It orbits the Sun at a distance of 2.8–3.2 AU once every 5 years and 3 months (1,910 days; semi-major axis of 3.01 AU). Its orbit has an eccentricity of 0.07 and an inclination of 11° with respect to the ecliptic.

The asteroid was first identified as 1932 EK at Heidelberg Observatory in March 1932. The body's observation arc begins at Algiers with its official discovery observation in November 1935.

== Physical characteristics ==
The Collaborative Asteroid Lightcurve Link (CALL) assumes Safara to be a stony S-type asteroid, while it has also characterized as a rare L-type asteroid by Pan-STARRS photometric survey. The overall spectral type of the Eos family is that of a K-type.

=== Rotation period and poles ===
In February 2002, a rotational lightcurve of Safara was obtained from photometric observations by American astronomer Brian Warner at his Palmer Divide Observatory (716) in Colorado. Lightcurve analysis gave a rotation period of 7.25 hours with a brightness amplitude of 0.36 magnitude (U=3-).

In 2018, the body's lightcurve has also been modeled in a focused study of Eoan asteroids. Modeling gave a period of 7.14908 hours and two spin axis in ecliptic coordinates (λ, β) of (197.0°, 32.0°) and (10.0°, 12.0°).

=== Diameter and albedo ===
According to the surveys carried out by the Japanese Akari satellite and the NEOWISE mission of NASA's Wide-field Infrared Survey Explorer, Safara measures between 21.197 and 32.63 kilometers in diameter and its surface has an albedo between 0.087 and 0.2231.

CALL assumes an albedo of 0.14 – derived from 221 Eos, the family's largest member and namesake – and calculates a diameter of 25.73 kilometers based on an absolute magnitude of 10.7.

== Naming ==
This minor planet was named after André Safar, presumably an acquaintance of the discoverer from Algiers. The official naming citation was mentioned in The Names of the Minor Planets by Paul Herget in 1955 (H 124).
