= USS Devosa =

Cargo ship of the United States Navy

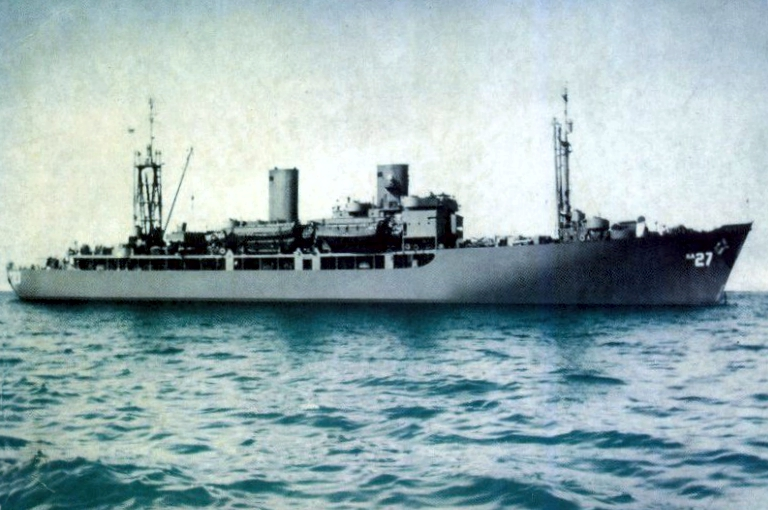

History

United States
- Name: USS Devosa
- Namesake: The asteroid Devosa
- Builder: Walsh-Kaiser Company, Providence, Rhode Island
- Launched: 12 October 1944
- Commissioned: 30 November 1944
- Decommissioned: 2 April 1946
- Honours and awards: 1 battle star (WWII)
- Fate: Scrapped, 1966

General characteristics
- Class & type: Artemis-class attack cargo ship
- Type: S4–SE2–BE1
- Displacement: 4,087 long tons (4,153 t) light; 7,080 long tons (7,194 t) full
- Length: 426 ft (130 m)
- Beam: 58 ft (18 m)
- Draft: 16 ft 6 in (5.03 m)
- Speed: 17 knots (31 km/h; 20 mph)
- Complement: 303 officers and enlisted
- Armament: 1 × 5"/38 caliber gun mount; 4 × twin 40 mm gun mounts; 10 × 20 mm gun mounts

USS Devosa (AKA-27) was an Artemis-class attack cargo ship in service with the United States Navy from 1944 to 1946. She was scrapped in 1966.

== History ==
Devosa (AKA-27) was named after the asteroid 337 Devosa. She was launched 12 October 1944 by Walsh-Kaiser Co., Inc., Providence, R.I., under a Maritime Commission contract; sponsored by Mrs. A. W. Radford, wife of Rear Admiral Radford; transferred to the Navy 30 November 1944; and commissioned the same day.

Devosa sailed from Norfolk 1 January 1945 carrying a cargo of oil drums to Pearl Harbor, arriving 21 January. On 3 February she got underway for Tulagi, Florida Islands, where she discharged 36 landing craft for the boat pool and took part in amphibious training, preparing for the invasion of Okinawa.

Carrying Marines, the Motor Torpedo Boat Squadron 11, a U.S. Military Government unit, and part of a Mobile Naval Hospital unit, Devosa sailed to Ulithi, staging point for the invasion of Okinawa, for which she sailed 27 March. Devosa landed troops and cargo in the initial assault on 1 April and remained off Okinawa until 10 April when she returned to the West Coast, arriving San Francisco 18 May.

Returning to the Pacific area Devosa carried naval construction battalion men and equipment from Pearl Harbor to Samar, then sailed to Manus to load antisubmarine net gear for transfer to Iwo Jima. Arriving at Saipan 13 August she carried recovered battle casualties who were returning to their units at Okinawa, arriving 3 September. A week later she got underway for Jinsen, landing troops for the occupation of Korea from 13 September to 15 September. Devosa carried occupation troops from Okinawa to Tientsin, China between 30 September and 9 October, then sailed by way of Manila, Philippine Islands, for Seattle, Wash., arriving 16 November. She carried cargo to Pearl Harbor, returning to San Pedro 25 December.

On 21 January 1946 Devosa put out for Norfolk where she arrived 6 February. She was decommissioned at New York 2 April 1946, and transferred to the Maritime Commission the same day. Devosa was transferred to the US Merchant Marine Academy at Kings Point, New York as a training vessel, and renamed Kings Pointer. Returned to the Maritime Commission in late 1946 for lay up in the National Defense Reserve Fleet. Finally scrapped in 1966.

== Awards ==
Devosa received one battle star for World War II service.
