= Joanny-Philippe Lagrula =

French astronomer

Asteroids discovered: 1
775 Lumière	January 6, 1914

Joanny-Philippe Lagrula (1870–1941) was a French astronomer. He was sometimes referred to as Philippe Lagrula.

In 1901, he wrote his thesis at the University of Lyon. At the time, occultations of the Pleiades by the Moon were important for measuring the correspondence of the Moon's actual position with that predicted by theory.

He worked at the Observatory of Lyon, France. On August 1, 1906, he became director of the Quito Astronomical Observatory for a few years. He then worked at Nice Observatory until 1924, when he joined the staff of Algiers Observatory. He was director of Algiers Observatory from 1931 to 1938, replacing François Gonnessiat who retired. His career path mirrored that of Gonnessiat, who had also worked at Lyon, and at the observatories in Quito and Algiers.

At Algiers, one of the staff members working with him was Jean-Louis Lagrula; this may have been his son.

He discovered one asteroid. The asteroid 1412 Lagrula is named after him.
