= 1339 Désagneauxa =

Stony Eoan asteroid

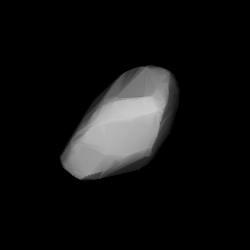
- Modelled shape of Désagneauxa

Discovery
- Discovered by: L. Boyer
- Discovery site: Algiers Obs.
- Discovery date: 4 December 1934

Designations
- Named after: discoverer's brother-in-law
- Alternative designations: 1934 XB · 1951 AF
- Minor planet category: main-belt · Eos

Orbital characteristics
- Epoch 4 September 2017 (JD 2458000.5)
- Uncertainty parameter 0
- Observation arc: 82.57 yr (30,160 days)
- Aphelion: 3.1936 AU
- Perihelion: 2.8467 AU
- Semi-major axis: 3.0202 AU
- Eccentricity: 0.0574
- Orbital period (sidereal): 5.25 yr (1,917 days)
- Mean anomaly: 260.48°
- Mean motion: 0° 11^{m} 16.08^{s} / day
- Inclination: 8.6903°
- Longitude of ascending node: 291.00°
- Argument of perihelion: 162.21°

Physical characteristics
- Dimensions: 22.96±1.7 km 23.04 km (derived); 24.20±0.65 km 24.450±0.209 km 25.733±0.200 km
- Synodic rotation period: 9.3209±0.0006 h 9.37510±0.00005 h 9.37514±0.00001 h 9.380±0.003 h
- Geometric albedo: 0.1274±0.0165; 0.144±0.024; 0.151±0.009; 0.1589±0.026; 0.1747 (derived)
- Spectral type: Tholen = S · S B–V = 0.790; U–B = 0.425
- Absolute magnitude (H): 10.30±0.23 · 10.7 · 10.81

1339 Désagneauxa, provisional designation 1934 XB, is a stony Eoan asteroid from the outer region of the asteroid belt, approximately 24 kilometers in diameter. It was discovered on 4 December 1934, by French astronomer Louis Boyer at the North African Algiers Observatory in Algeria. A few nights later, the asteroid was independently discovered by astronomers Grigory Neujmin and Eugène Delporte, at the Crimean Simeiz and Belgian Uccle Observatory, respectively. It was later named after discoverer's brother-in-law.

== Orbit and classification ==
Désagneauxa is a member of the Eos family, which is thought to have formed from a catastrophic collision, disrupting its parent body into thousands of fragments. It is the 4th largest asteroid family with nearly 10,000 known members. The asteroid orbits the Sun in the outer main-belt at a distance of 2.8–3.2 AU once every 5 years and 3 months (1,917 days). Its orbit has an eccentricity of 0.06 and an inclination of 9° with respect to the ecliptic. As no precovery were taken, and no prior identifications were made, the body's observation arc begins with its official discovery at Algiers in 1934.

== Naming ==
This minor planet was named by the discoverer in honour of his brother-in-law. The official naming citation was mentioned in The Names of the Minor Planets by Paul Herget in 1955 (H 122).

== Physical characteristics ==
In the Tholen taxonomy, Désagneauxa is a stony S-type asteroid.

=== Rotation period ===
In August 2008, a rotational lightcurve of this asteroid was obtained by French amateur astronomer René Roy. Lightcurve analysis gave it a rotation period of 9.3209 hours with a change in brightness of 0.48 magnitude (U=2+). In November 2007, photometric observations at the U.S. Ricky Observatory (H46), Missouri, gave a refined period of 9.380 hours with an amplitude of 0.45 magnitude (U=3).

=== Spin axis ===
In addition modeled lightcurves, using photometric data from the Lowell photometric database and other sources, gave a period of 9.37510 and 9.37514 hours, as well as a spin axis of (n.a., 65.0°) and (63.0°, 53.0°) in ecliptic coordinates, respectively (U=n.a.).

=== Diameter and albedo ===
According to the surveys carried out by the Infrared Astronomical Satellite IRAS, the Japanese Akari satellite, and NASA's Wide-field Infrared Survey Explorer with its subsequent NEOWISE mission, Désagneauxa measures between 22.96 and 25.73 kilometers in diameter, and its surface has an albedo between 0.127 and 0.159. The Collaborative Asteroid Lightcurve Link derives an albedo of 0.1747 and a diameter of 23.04 kilometers with an absolute magnitude of 10.7.
