= 1295 Deflotte =

Asteroid

Discovery
- Discovered by: L. Boyer
- Discovery site: Algiers Obs.
- Discovery date: 25 November 1933

Designations
- Named after: Deflotte (discoverer's nephew)
- Alternative designations: 1933 WD · 1932 RE; 1938 QF · 1939 VN; 1941 CE · 1947 CA; 1951 TV · 1963 TU
- Minor planet category: main-belt · (outer)

Orbital characteristics
- Epoch 4 September 2017 (JD 2458000.5)
- Uncertainty parameter 0
- Observation arc: 83.61 yr (30,538 days)
- Aphelion: 3.8043 AU
- Perihelion: 2.9788 AU
- Semi-major axis: 3.3916 AU
- Eccentricity: 0.1217
- Orbital period (sidereal): 6.25 yr (2,281 days)
- Mean anomaly: 131.90°
- Mean motion: 0° 9^{m} 28.08^{s} / day
- Inclination: 2.8858°
- Longitude of ascending node: 185.08°
- Argument of perihelion: 275.34°

Physical characteristics
- Dimensions: 45.67±1.36 km 47.407±0.221 km 47.99 km (derived); 48.03±1.8 km 48.68±16.05 km 49.07±18.00 km 51.048±0.525 km
- Synodic rotation period: 14.64±0.05 h
- Geometric albedo: 0.0390±0.0079; 0.04±0.02; 0.04±0.03; 0.0402 (derived); 0.0441±0.004; 0.046±0.014; 0.049±0.003
- Spectral type: C
- Absolute magnitude (H): 10.60 · 10.70 · 10.84±0.20 · 10.93

1295 Deflotte, provisional designation 1933 WD, is a carbonaceous asteroid from the outer regions of the asteroid belt, approximately 48 kilometers in diameter. It was discovered on 25 November 1933, by French astronomer Louis Boyer at the Algiers Observatory in Algeria, North Africa. The asteroid was named after the discoverer's nephew.

== Orbit and classification ==
Deflotte is a non-family asteroid from the main belt's background population. It orbits the Sun in the outer main-belt at a distance of 3.0–3.8 AU once every 6 years and 3 months (2,281 days). Its orbit has an eccentricity of 0.12 and an inclination of 3° with respect to the ecliptic.

The asteroid was first identified as 1932 RE at Heidelberg Observatory in September 1932. The body's observation arc begins with its official discovery observation at Algiers in November 1933.

== Physical characteristics ==
Deflotte is an assumed carbonaceous C-type asteroid.

=== Rotation period ===
In September 2007, a rotational lightcurve of Deflotte was obtained from photometric observations by French amateur astronomer René Roy. Lightcurve analysis gave a rotation period of 14.64 hours with a brightness amplitude of 0.16 magnitude (U=2).

=== Diameter and albedo ===
According to the surveys carried out by the Infrared Astronomical Satellite IRAS, the Japanese Akari satellite and the NEOWISE mission of NASA's Wide-field Infrared Survey Explorer, Deflotte measures between 45.67 and 51.048 kilometers in diameter and its surface has an albedo between 0.0390 and 0.049. The Collaborative Asteroid Lightcurve Link derives an albedo of 0.0402 and a diameter of 47.99 kilometers based on an absolute magnitude of 10.7.

== Naming ==
This minor planet was named after Louis Boyer's nephew. The official naming citation was mentioned in The Names of the Minor Planets by Paul Herget in 1955 (H 118).
