= 1340 Yvette =

Main-belt asteroid

Discovery
- Discovered by: L. Boyer
- Discovery site: Algiers Obs.
- Discovery date: 27 December 1934

Designations
- Named after: Yvette (discoverer's niece)
- Alternative designations: 1934 YA · 1930 DO; 1942 GW
- Minor planet category: main-belt · (outer); Themis

Orbital characteristics
- Epoch 4 September 2017 (JD 2458000.5)
- Uncertainty parameter 0
- Observation arc: 82.84 yr (30,256 days)
- Aphelion: 3.5930 AU
- Perihelion: 2.7754 AU
- Semi-major axis: 3.1842 AU
- Eccentricity: 0.1284
- Orbital period (sidereal): 5.68 yr (2,075 days)
- Mean anomaly: 123.54°
- Mean motion: 0° 10^{m} 24.6^{s} / day
- Inclination: 0.4161°
- Longitude of ascending node: 345.69°
- Argument of perihelion: 224.26°

Physical characteristics
- Dimensions: 25.87±2.6 km 28.40±1.70 km 28.63±0.55 km 29.451±0.278 km 30.3±3.0 km 32±3 km 33.061±0.632 km
- Synodic rotation period: 3.525 h
- Geometric albedo: 0.0587±0.0044; 0.06±0.01; 0.07±0.01; 0.078±0.018; 0.082±0.011; 0.095±0.015; 0.0958±0.023
- Spectral type: C
- Absolute magnitude (H): 11.10 · 11.12±0.29

1340 Yvette, provisional designation 1934 YA, is a carbonaceous Themistian asteroid from the outer regions of the asteroid belt, approximately 29 kilometers in diameter. It was discovered on 27 December 1934, by astronomer Louis Boyer at the Algiers Observatory, who named it after his niece, Yvette.

== Orbit and classification ==
Yvette is a Themistian asteroid that belongs to the Themis family (602), a very large family of nearly 5,000 member asteroids, named after 24 Themis. It orbits the Sun in the outer main belt at a distance of 2.8–3.6 AU once every 5 years and 8 months (2,075 days; semi-major axis of 3.18 AU). Its orbit has an eccentricity of 0.13 and an inclination of 0° with respect to the ecliptic.

The asteroid was first identified as 1930 DO at Heidelberg Observatory in February 1930. The body's observation arc begins with its official discovery observation at Algiers in 1934.

== Physical characteristics ==
Yvette has been characterized as a carbonaceous C-type asteroid by Pan-STARRS photometric survey, in line with the overall spectral type of the Themis family.

=== Rotation period ===
Published in 2004, a first rotational lightcurve of Yvette was obtained from photometric observations by Brazilian and Argentinian astronomers. Lightcurve analysis gave a relatively short rotation period of 3.525 hours with a brightness amplitude of 0.16 magnitude (U=2).

=== Diameter and albedo ===
According to the surveys carried out by the Infrared Astronomical Satellite IRAS, the Japanese Akari satellite and the NEOWISE mission of NASA's Wide-field Infrared Survey Explorer, Yvette measures between 25.87 and 33.061 kilometers in diameter and its surface has an albedo between 0.0587 and 0.0958.

The Collaborative Asteroid Lightcurve Link adopts the results obtained by IRAS, that is an albedo of 0.0958 and a diameter of 25.87 kilometers based on an absolute magnitude of 11.1.

== Naming ==
This minor planet was named by the discoverer in honor of his niece, Yvette. The official naming citation was mentioned in The Names of the Minor Planets by Paul Herget in 1955 (H 122).
