= 1511 Daléra =

Main-belt asteroid

Discovery
- Discovered by: L. Boyer
- Discovery site: Algiers Obs.
- Discovery date: 22 March 1939

Designations
- Named after: Paul Daléra (friend of discoverer)
- Alternative designations: 1939 FB · 1928 DB; 1954 LM
- Minor planet category: main-belt · (inner)

Orbital characteristics
- Epoch 21 November 2025 (JD 2461000.5)
- Uncertainty parameter 0
- Observation arc: 88.75 yr (32,415 days)
- Aphelion: 2.6132 AU
- Perihelion: 2.1023 AU
- Semi-major axis: 2.3577 AU
- Eccentricity: 0.1083
- Orbital period (sidereal): 3.62 yr (1,322 days)
- Mean anomaly: 332.98°
- Mean motion: 0° 16^{m} 19.92^{s} / day
- Inclination: 4.067°
- Longitude of ascending node: 81.704°
- Argument of perihelion: 96.833°
- Earth MOID: 1.1094 au
- Jupiter MOID: 2.354 au

Physical characteristics
- Dimensions: 7.15 km (calculated); 11.36±3.14 km 13.515±0.231 km 18.23±1.28 km
- Synodic rotation period: 3.880±0.001 h 3.881±0.001 h 4.2227±0.0011 h
- Geometric albedo: 0.08±0.011; 0.080±0.011; 0.10±0.05; 0.20 (assumed)
- Spectral type: S
- Absolute magnitude (H): 12.644±0.002 (R) · 12.70 · 12.8 · 12.99 · 13.09

1511 Daléra (provisional designation 1939 FB) is an asteroid from the inner regions of the asteroid belt, approximately 12 kilometers in diameter. It was discovered on 22 March 1939, by French astronomer Louis Boyer at the Algerian Algiers Observatory, North Africa, and named after Paul Daléra, a friend of the discoverer.

== Classification and orbit ==
Daléra orbits the Sun in the inner main-belt at a distance of 2.1–2.6 AU once every 3 years and 7 months (1,323 days). Its orbit has an eccentricity of 0.11 and an inclination of 4° with respect to the ecliptic. It was first identified as 1928 DB at Heidelberg Observatory in 1928, extending the body's observation arc by 11 years prior to its official discovery observation.

== Physical characteristics ==
=== Rotation period ===
In March 2015, three rotational lightcurves of Daléra were independently obtained by Italian astronomers Maurizio Scardella (D06), Fabio Salvaggio (K54, A81), and Giovanni Casalnuovo (C62) after being reported as a light-curve photometry opportunity at minorplanet.info (CALL). They gave a rotation period of 3.880 and 3.881 hours with a brightness variation of 0.18 and 0.14 magnitude, respectively (U=2/3-/2-). Previously, photometric observations at the Palomar Transient Factory in September 2013, gave a longer period of 4.2227 hours and an amplitude of 0.14 magnitude (U=2).

=== Diameter and albedo ===
According to the surveys carried out by NASA's Wide-field Infrared Survey Explorer with its subsequent NEOWISE mission, Daléra measures between 11.36 and 18.23 kilometers in diameter, and its surface has an albedo between 0.03 and 0.10.

The Collaborative Asteroid Lightcurve Link assumes a standard albedo for S-type asteroids of 0.20 and calculates a diameter of 7.15 kilometers based on an absolute magnitude of 13.09. However, based on the low albedos (0.03, 0.08, 0.10) determined by WISE/NEOWISE, Daléra is not a stony but rather a carbonaceous asteroid, which are uncommon in the inner main-belt.

== Naming ==
This minor planet was named after Paul Daléra, a friend of the discovering astronomer Louis Boyer. The official naming citation was first mentioned in The Names of the Minor Planets by Paul Herget in 1955 (H 135)
