= 1338 Duponta =

Stony Florian asteroid and synchronous binary system

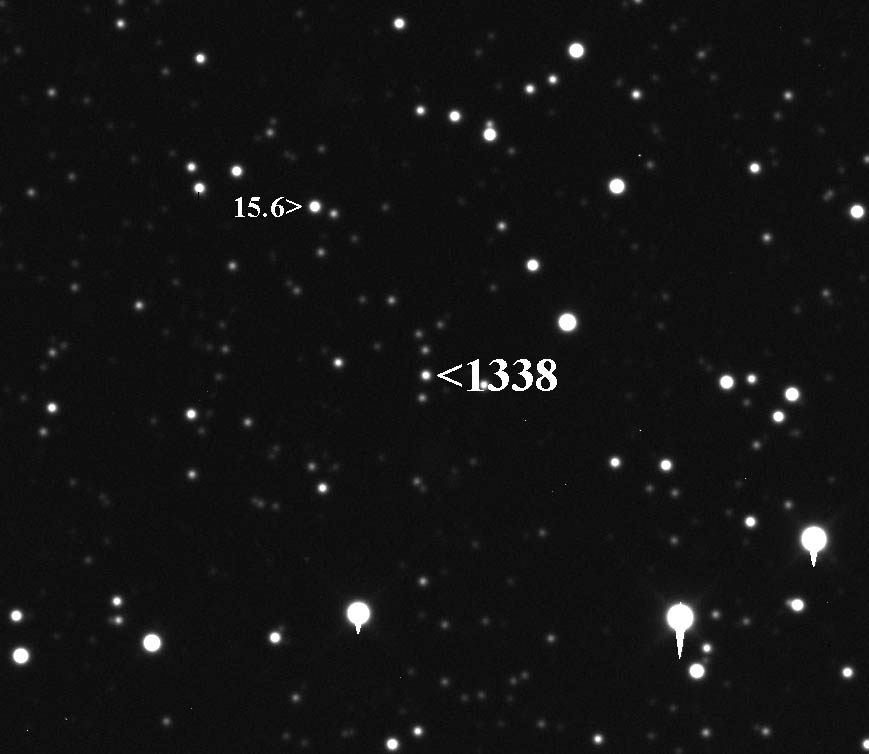
- Duponta seen at approx. 16 apmag in 2009

Discovery
- Discovered by: L. Boyer
- Discovery site: Algiers Obs.
- Discovery date: 4 December 1934

Designations
- Pronunciation: /djuːˈpɒntə/
- Named after: Marc Dupont (discoverer's nephew)
- Alternative designations: 1934 XA
- Minor planet category: main-belt · (inner); Flora

Orbital characteristics
- Epoch 4 September 2017 (JD 2458000.5)
- Uncertainty parameter 0
- Observation arc: 82.42 yr (30,104 days)
- Aphelion: 2.5179 AU
- Perihelion: 2.0108 AU
- Semi-major axis: 2.2644 AU
- Eccentricity: 0.1120
- Orbital period (sidereal): 3.41 yr (1,245 days)
- Mean anomaly: 102.88°
- Mean motion: 0° 17^{m} 21.48^{s} / day
- Inclination: 4.8170°
- Longitude of ascending node: 325.63°
- Argument of perihelion: 110.63°
- Known satellites: 1 (P: 17.57; D: 1.77 km)

Physical characteristics
- Dimensions: 7.470±0.114 km 7.68±0.06 (derived); 7.875±0.062 km 7.88 km (taken); 7.885 km
- Synodic rotation period: 3.85449±0.0003 h (Note: Pravec (2010) lightcurve plots – short and long period for (1338) Duponta, from online data published by the Ondrejov Asteroid Photometry Project. Summary figures at the LCDB); 3.85453±0.00009 h 3.85453±0.0003 h (Note: Pravec (2007) lightcurve plots – short and long period for (1338) Duponta, from online data published by the Ondrejov Asteroid Photometry Project. Summary figures at the LCDB)
- Geometric albedo: 0.2159; 0.2286±0.0274; 0.251±0.040
- Spectral type: S (assumed)
- Absolute magnitude (H): 12.30±0.03 (R) · 12.39±0.2 (R) · 12.6 · 12.7 · 12.75 · 12.798±0.064

1338 Duponta, provisional designation 1934 XA, is a stony Florian asteroid and synchronous binary system from the inner regions of the asteroid belt, approximately 7.8 kilometers in diameter.

It was discovered on 4 December 1934, by French astronomer Louis Boyer at the Algiers Observatory in Algeria, North Africa. It was named after the discoverer's nephew, Marc Dupont. The asteroid's unnamed minor-planet moon was discovered in March 2007. It measures approximately 1.77 kilometers in diameter and has an orbital period of 17.57 hours.

== Orbit and classification ==
Duponta is a member of the Flora family (402), a giant asteroid family and the largest family of stony asteroids in the main belt. It orbits the Sun in the inner main belt at a distance of 2.0–2.5 AU once every 3 years and 5 months (1,245 days). Its orbit has an eccentricity of 0.11 and an inclination of 5° with respect to the ecliptic. The body's observation arc begins with its official discovery observation at Algiers in 1934.

== Physical characteristics ==
Duponta is an assumed stony S-type asteroid, which agrees with the Flora family's overall spectral type.

=== Rotation period ===
In March 2007, a rotational lightcurve of Duponta was obtained from photometric observations by a collaboration of Czech (Ondřejov Observatory), Slovak (Modra Observatory), Australian and American astronomers. Lightcurve analysis gave a well-defined rotation period of 3.85453 hours with a brightness variation of 0.23 magnitude (U=3). Follow-up observations by Petr Pravec in 2007 and 2010, gave a concurring period of 3.85449 and 3.85453 hours with an amplitude of 0.26 and 0.23 magnitude, respectively (U=3/3).

=== Moon ===
During the photometric observations in 2007, it was also revealed that Duponta is a synchronous binary asteroid with a minor-planet moon orbiting it every 17.57(8) hours. Based on mutual eclipse and occultation events with a magnitude between 0.06 and 0.12, the binary system has a mean-diameter ratio of 0.23±0.02, which translates into a diameter of 1.77 kilometers for the satellite. It has an estimated semi-major axis of 14 kilometers.

=== Diameter and albedo ===
According to the survey carried out by the NEOWISE mission of NASA's Wide-field Infrared Survey Explorer, Duponta measures 7.470 and 7.875 kilometers in diameter and its surface has an albedo of 0.2286 and 0.251, respectively.

The Collaborative Asteroid Lightcurve Link adopts Petr Pravec's revised WISE data, that is, an albedo of 0.2159 and a diameter of 7.885 kilometers based on an absolute magnitude of 12.798.

== Naming ==
This minor planet was named by the discoverer after his nephew Marc Dupont. The official naming citation was mentioned in The Names of the Minor Planets by Paul Herget in 1955 (H 122).
