= 1301 Yvonne =

Main-belt asteroid

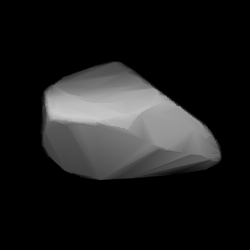
- Modelled shape of Yvonne from its lightcurve

Discovery
- Discovered by: L. Boyer
- Discovery site: Algiers Obs.
- Discovery date: 7 March 1934

Designations
- Named after: Yvonne Boyer (discoverer's sister)
- Alternative designations: 1934 EA
- Minor planet category: main-belt · (outer) background

Orbital characteristics
- Epoch 4 September 2017 (JD 2458000.5)
- Uncertainty parameter 0
- Observation arc: 83.32 yr (30,433 days)
- Aphelion: 3.5134 AU
- Perihelion: 2.0225 AU
- Semi-major axis: 2.7680 AU
- Eccentricity: 0.2693
- Orbital period (sidereal): 4.61 yr (1,682 days)
- Mean anomaly: 96.456°
- Mean motion: 0° 12^{m} 50.4^{s} / day
- Inclination: 34.030°
- Longitude of ascending node: 161.56°
- Argument of perihelion: 302.27°

Physical characteristics
- Mean diameter: 18.693±4.943 km 20.44±5.24 km 21.438±0.088 km 21.54±0.25 km 21.681±0.204 km 21.95±0.41 km 22.77±2.4 km
- Synodic rotation period: 7.2536±0.0002 h 7.3196±0.0001 h 7.3200±0.0001 h 7.320±0.005 h
- Pole ecliptic latitude: (39.0°, 41.0°) (λ_{1}/β_{1})
- Geometric albedo: 0.10±0.12; 0.111±0.020; 0.1167±0.0700; 0.1632±0.040; 0.1806±0.0479; 0.201±0.006
- Spectral type: SMASS = C · C
- Absolute magnitude (H): 10.80 · 11.30 · 11.32 · 11.40±0.22

1301 Yvonne (prov. designation: 1934 EA) is a carbonaceous background asteroid from the background population of the intermediate asteroid belt, approximately 21 kilometers (13 miles) in diameter. It was discovered on 7 March 1934, by French astronomer Louis Boyer at the Algiers Observatory in North Africa. The asteroid was named for the discoverer's sister, Yvonne Boyer

== Orbit and classification ==
Yvonne is a non-family of the main belt's background population. It orbits the Sun in the central asteroid belt at a distance of 2.0–3.5 AU once every 4 years and 7 months (1,682 days; semi-major axis of 2.77 AU). Its orbit has an eccentricity of 0.27 and an inclination of 34° with respect to the ecliptic. The body's observation arc begins with its official discovery observation at Algiers in March 1934.

== Naming ==
This minor planet was named after Yvonne Boyer, sister of discoverer. The official naming citation was mentioned in The Names of the Minor Planets by Paul Herget in 1955 (H 101).

== Physical characteristics ==
In the SMASS classification, Yvonne is a carbonaceous C-type asteroid. PanSTARRS photometric survey also characterized the asteroid as a C-type.

=== Rotation period and pole ===
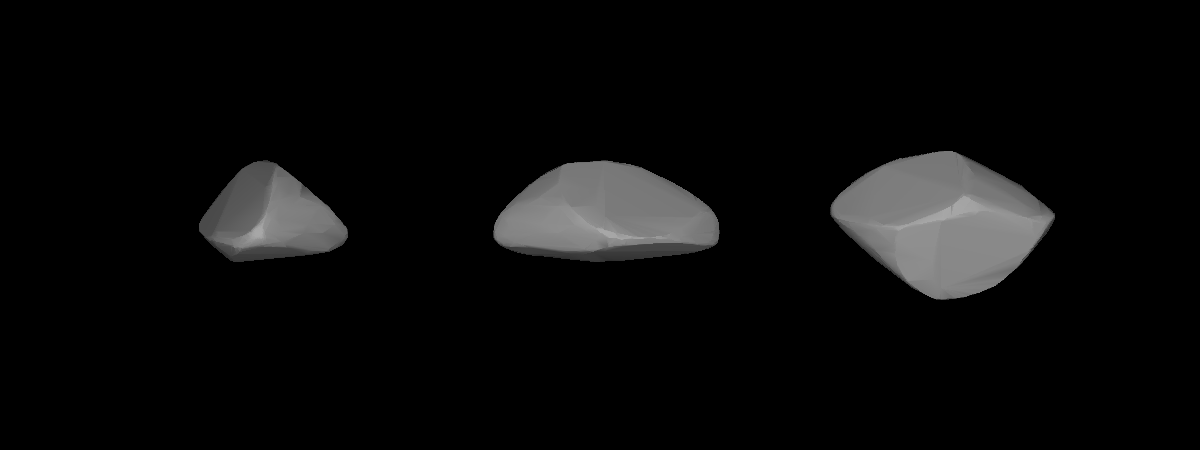
Lightcurve-based 3D-model of Yvonne

Between 2003 and 2017, four rotational lightcurves of Yvonne have been obtained from photometric observations. Analysis gave a consolidated rotation period of 7.320 hours with a brightness amplitude between 0.52 and 0.90 magnitude (U=3/3/3/3). In 2011, a modeled lightcurve using data from the Uppsala Asteroid Photometric Catalogue (UAPC) and other sources gave a concurring period 7.31968±0.00005 hours, as well as a spin axis of (39.0°, 41.0°) in ecliptic coordinates (λ, β).

=== Diameter and albedo ===
According to the surveys carried out by the Infrared Astronomical Satellite IRAS, the Japanese Akari satellite and the NEOWISE mission of NASA's Wide-field Infrared Survey Explorer, Yvonne measures between 18.693 and 22.77 kilometers in diameter and its surface has an albedo between 0.10 and 0.201.

The Collaborative Asteroid Lightcurve Link derives an albedo of 0.1054 (which is untypically high for a carbonaceous body) and a diameter of 22.50 kilometers based on an absolute magnitude of 11.3.
