= 775 Lumière =

Minor planet

Discovery
- Discovered by: J. Lagrula
- Discovery site: Nice Observatory
- Discovery date: 6 January 1914

Designations
- Alternative designations: 1914 TX

Orbital characteristics
- Epoch 31 July 2016 (JD 2457600.5)
- Uncertainty parameter 0
- Observation arc: 86.07 yr (31436 d)
- Aphelion: 3.2277 AU (482.86 Gm)
- Perihelion: 2.7971 AU (418.44 Gm)
- Semi-major axis: 3.0124 AU (450.65 Gm)
- Eccentricity: 0.071473
- Orbital period (sidereal): 5.23 yr (1909.7 d)
- Mean anomaly: 235.239°
- Mean motion: 0° 11^{m} 18.636^{s} / day
- Inclination: 9.2891°
- Longitude of ascending node: 297.761°
- Argument of perihelion: 167.229°

Physical characteristics
- Mean radius: 16.795±0.8 km
- Synodic rotation period: 6.103 h (0.2543 d)
- Geometric albedo: 0.1083±0.011
- Absolute magnitude (H): 10.2

775 Lumière is a minor planet orbiting the Sun. The apparent magnitude is 10.40. The diameter is 33.58 kilometers. Its rotational period is 6.103 hours, and the albedo is .108. The name honors Auguste and Louis Lumiere and the company making photographic film for astronomers in France.
