= Louis Boyer (astronomer) =

French astronomer (1901–1999)

Louis Boyer (1901–1999) was a French astronomer who worked at the Algiers Observatory, North Africa, where he discovered 40 asteroids between 1930 and 1952.

In the 1950s and 1960s. he worked on identifications of small Solar System bodies at Nice Observatory in southeastern France. The asteroid 1215 Boyer, discovered by his colleague Alfred Schmitt at Algiers in 1932, was named after him. In turn Boyer named the 1617 Alschmitt asteroid in honor of Schmitt.

Boyer also named 1713 Bancilhon after Odette Bancilhon his colleague and wife of astronomer Alfred Schmitt.

Discoveries by Louis Boyer (i)
1177 Gonnessia	November 24, 1930
1211 Bressole	December 2, 1931
1212 Francette	December 3, 1931
1295 Deflotte	November 25, 1933
1296 Andrée	November 25, 1933
1301 Yvonne	March 7, 1934
1338 Duponta	December 4, 1934
1339 Désagneauxa	December 4, 1934
1340 Yvette	December 27, 1934
1343 Nicole	March 29, 1935
1344 Caubeta	April 1, 1935
1364 Safara	November 18, 1935
1377 Roberbauxa	February 14, 1936
1380 Volodia	March 16, 1936

Discoveries by Louis Boyer (ii)
1392 Pierre	March 16, 1936
1400 Tirela	November 17, 1936
1412 Lagrula	January 19, 1937
1413 Roucarie	February 12, 1937
1414 Jérôme	February 12, 1937
1415 Malautra	March 4, 1937
1416 Renauxa	March 4, 1937
1511 Daléra	March 22, 1939
1574 Meyer	March 22, 1949
1577 Reiss	January 19, 1949
1594 Danjon	November 23, 1949
1597 Laugier	March 7, 1949
1598 Paloque	February 11, 1950
1599 Giomus	November 17, 1950

Discoveries by Louis Boyer (iii)
1601 Patry	May 18, 1942
1606 Jekhovsky	September 14, 1950
1616 Filipoff	March 15, 1950
1617 Alschmitt	March 20, 1952
1629 Pecker	February 28, 1952
1630 Milet	February 28, 1952
1649 Fabre	February 27, 1951
1713 Bancilhon	September 27, 1951
1714 Sy	July 25, 1951
1851 Lacroute	November 9, 1950
2021 Poincaré	June 26, 1936
4422 Jarre	October 17, 1942
