= 339 Dorothea =

Main-belt asteroid

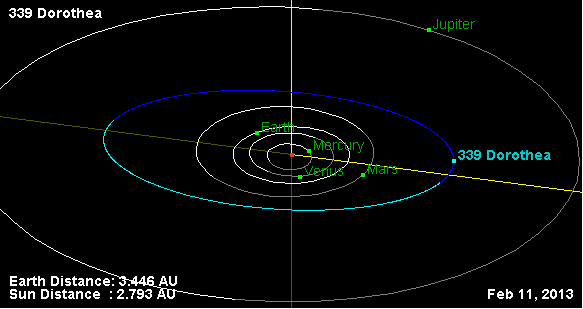
- Orbital diagram

Discovery
- Discovered by: Max Wolf
- Discovery date: 25 September 1892

Designations
- Pronunciation: /dɒəˈθiːə/
- Named after: Dorothea Klumpke
- Alternative designations: 1892 G
- Minor planet category: Main belt (Eos)

Orbital characteristics
- Epoch 31 July 2016 (JD 2457600.5)
- Uncertainty parameter 0
- Observation arc: 123.55 yr (45128 d)
- Aphelion: 3.3041 AU (494.29 Gm)
- Perihelion: 2.71937 AU (406.812 Gm)
- Semi-major axis: 3.01176 AU (450.553 Gm)
- Eccentricity: 0.097082
- Orbital period (sidereal): 5.23 yr (1909.1 d)
- Mean anomaly: 271.598°
- Mean motion: 0° 11^{m} 18.852^{s} / day
- Inclination: 9.9640°
- Longitude of ascending node: 173.512°
- Argument of perihelion: 164.360°

Physical characteristics
- Dimensions: 38.25±1.6 km
- Synodic rotation period: 5.974 h (0.2489 d)
- Geometric albedo: 0.2431±0.021
- Spectral type: S (Tholen); K (SMASSII)
- Absolute magnitude (H): 9.24

339 Dorothea is a large main belt asteroid that was discovered by German astronomer Max Wolf on 25 September 1892 in Heidelberg.

This is a member of the dynamic Eos family of asteroids that were probably formed as the result of a collisional breakup of a parent body.

This asteroid is named after astronomer Dorothea Klumpke, as is 1040 Klumpkea.
