= 1734 Zhongolovich =

Main-belt asteroid

Discovery
- Discovered by: G. Neujmin
- Discovery site: Simeiz Obs.
- Discovery date: 11 October 1928

Designations
- Named after: Ivan Danilovich Zhongolovich (Russian geodesist, ITA)
- Alternative designations: 1928 TJ · 1937 RO; 1942 XQ · 1951 RM_{1} 1965 UG
- Minor planet category: main-belt · (middle); Dora familyDora

Orbital characteristics
- Epoch 4 September 2017 (JD 2458000.5)
- Uncertainty parameter 0
- Observation arc: 88.43 yr (32,298 days)
- Aphelion: 3.4186 AU
- Perihelion: 2.1341 AU
- Semi-major axis: 2.7763 AU
- Eccentricity: 0.2313
- Orbital period (sidereal): 4.63 yr (1,690 days)
- Mean anomaly: 83.389°
- Mean motion: 0° 12^{m} 47.16^{s} / day
- Inclination: 8.3467°
- Longitude of ascending node: 182.16°
- Argument of perihelion: 186.45°

Physical characteristics
- Dimensions: 25.620±0.113 km 26.425±0.122; 28.47 (IRAS:16) km 28.67±10.07 km 33.04±0.71 km
- Synodic rotation period: 7.171±0.004 h
- Geometric albedo: 0.031±0.001; 0.035±0.002; 0.04±0.05; 0.0456 (IRAS:16); 0.0508±0.0008
- Spectral type: SMASS = Ch · C
- Absolute magnitude (H): 11.68±0.38 · 11.7 · 11.74

1734 Zhongolovich, provisional designation 1928 TJ, is a carbonaceous Dorian asteroid from the central region of the asteroid belt, approximately 28 kilometers in diameter.

It was discovered on 11 October 1928, by Russian astronomer Grigory Neujmin at Simeiz Observatory on the Crimean peninsula. It was later named after Russian astronomer and geodesist Ivan Zhongolovich.

== Orbit and classification ==
Zhongolovich is presumably the largest member of the Dora family (FIN: 512), a well-established central asteroid family of more than 1,200 carbonaceous asteroids, named after 668 Dora. The Dora family is alternatively known as the "Zhongolovich family".

Zhongolovich orbits the Sun in the central main-belt at a distance of 2.1–3.4 AU once every 4 years and 8 months (1,690 days). Its orbit has an eccentricity of 0.23 and an inclination of 8° with respect to the ecliptic. The body's observation arc begins 9 years after its official discovery observation at Simeiz, with its identification 1937 RO made at Johannesburg Observatory in September 1937.

== Physical characteristics ==
In the SMASS classification, Zhongolovich is characterized as a Ch-subtype, a carbonaceous C-type asteroid which shows evidence of hydrated minerals.

=== Rotation period ===
In August 2011, a rotational lightcurve of Zhongolovich was obtained from photometric observations by French amateur astronomer Pierre Antonini. Lightcurve analysis gave a well-defined rotation period of 7.171 hours with a brightness variation of 0.21 magnitude (U=3).

=== Diameter and albedo ===
According to the surveys carried out by the Infrared Astronomical Satellite IRAS, the Japanese Akari satellite, and NASA's Wide-field Infrared Survey Explorer with its subsequent NEOWISE mission, Zhongolovich measures between 25.62 and 33.04 kilometers in diameter and its surface has an albedo between and 0.031 and 0.051.

The Collaborative Asteroid Lightcurve Link agrees with the results obtained by IRAS, that is, an albedo of 0.0456 and a diameter of 28.47 kilometers with an absolute magnitude of 11.7.

== Naming ==
This minor planet is named in honor of Russian astronomer and geodesist Ivan Danilovich Zhongolovich, who was the head of the Special Ephemeris Department at the Institute of Theoretical Astronomy (ITA) in St Petersburg. The official naming citation was published by the Minor Planet Center on 20 February 1976 (M.P.C. 3933).
