= 337 Devosa =

Main-belt asteroid

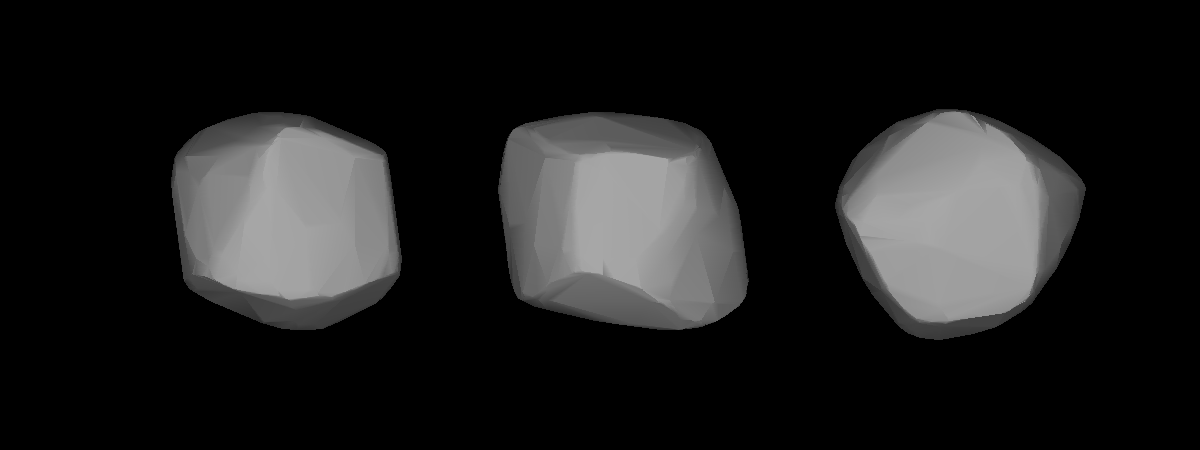
- Lightcurve-based 3D model of 337 Devosa

Discovery
- Discovered by: Auguste Charlois
- Discovery date: 22 September 1892

Designations
- Pronunciation: /dɪˈvoʊsə/
- Named after: (unknown)
- Alternative designations: 1892 E
- Minor planet category: Main belt

Orbital characteristics
- Epoch 31 July 2016 (JD 2457600.5)
- Uncertainty parameter 0
- Observation arc: 123.6 yr (45,130 d)
- Aphelion: 2.71030 AU (405.455 Gm)
- Perihelion: 2.05546 AU (307.492 Gm)
- Semi-major axis: 2.38288 AU (356.474 Gm)
- Eccentricity: 0.13741
- Orbital period (sidereal): 3.68 yr (1,343.4 d)
- Mean anomaly: 169.690°
- Mean motion: 0° 16^{m} 4.616^{s} / day
- Inclination: 7.85443°
- Longitude of ascending node: 355.479°
- Argument of perihelion: 98.6063°

Physical characteristics
- Dimensions: 64.549±1.303 km 66.63±0.98 km
- Mass: (5.34 ± 2.63/1.3)×10^{17} kg
- Mean density: 3.449 ± 1.700/0.839 g/cm^{3}
- Synodic rotation period: 4.653 h (0.1939 d)
- Geometric albedo: 0.135±0.017
- Spectral type: X
- Absolute magnitude (H): 8.99

337 Devosa is a large Main belt asteroid. It was discovered by Auguste Charlois on 22 September 1892 in Nice. The asteroid is orbiting the Sun at a distance of 2.38 AU with a period of 3.68 years and an eccentricity (ovalness) of 0.14. These orbital elements are similar to that of the large asteroid 4 Vesta. The orbital plane of 337 Devosa is tilted at an angle of 7.85° to the plane of the ecliptic.

This is classified as an X-type asteroid in the Tholen system and Xk type in the Bus-DeMeo taxonomy, with spectral properties similar to mesosiderites. It spans a girth of 59±2 km and has a rotation period of 4.65 h.
