= 668 Dora =

Asteroid

Discovery
- Discovered by: August Kopff
- Discovery site: Heidelberg
- Discovery date: 27 July 1908

Designations
- Pronunciation: /ˈdɔːrə/
- Alternative designations: 1908 DO
- Minor planet category: asteroid belt; Dora family

Orbital characteristics
- Epoch 31 July 2016 (JD 2457600.5)
- Uncertainty parameter 0
- Observation arc: 107.05 yr (39099 d)
- Aphelion: 3.4515 AU (516.34 Gm)
- Perihelion: 2.1369 AU (319.68 Gm)
- Semi-major axis: 2.7942 AU (418.01 Gm)
- Eccentricity: 0.23524
- Orbital period (sidereal): 4.67 yr (1706.0 d)
- Mean anomaly: 22.6953°
- Mean motion: 0° 12^{m} 39.672^{s} / day
- Inclination: 6.8428°
- Longitude of ascending node: 214.450°
- Argument of perihelion: 113.302°

Physical characteristics
- Mean radius: 13.42±0.35 km
- Synodic rotation period: 22.914 h (0.9548 d)
- Geometric albedo: 0.0467±0.003
- Absolute magnitude (H): 12.0

668 Dora is an asteroid orbiting in the asteroid belt located roughly between the orbits of the planets Mars and Jupiter. The name may have been inspired by the asteroid's provisional designation 1908 DO.
