= Center of Research in Astronomy, Astrophysics, and Geophysics =

Observatory in Algeria

Center of Research in Astronomy, Astrophysics and Geophysics
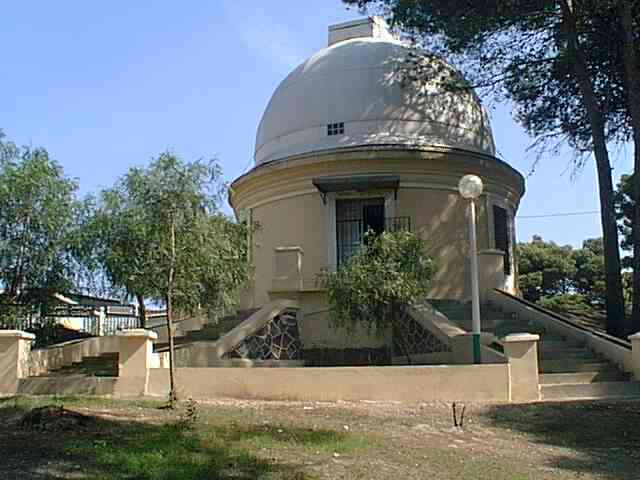
- Alternative names: CRAAG
- Observatory code: 008
- Location: Algiers, Algiers Province, Algeria
- Coordinates: 36°47′52″N 3°01′56″E
- Established: 1985
- Website: www.craag.dz
- Location of Center of Research in Astronomy, Astrophysics, and Geophysics

The Algiers Observatory was built in the late 19th century in the Algiers suburb of Bouzaréah, Algeria, North Africa. It participated in the Astrographic Catalogue project, taking the zone between -2 and +4 degrees to expose 1,260 plates between the years 1891 and 1911. At the tail end of that time, the director of the installation was François Gonnessiat.

It is now known as the Centre de Recherche en Astronomie Astrophysique et Géophysique (CRAAG), where it combines astronomy with work in astrophysics, and geophysical research, including the monitoring of earthquakes.

== Astronomers ==
Astronomers who worked at the observatory include:

- Alfred Schmitt
- Benjamin Jekhowsky
- Frédéric Sy
- Guy Reiss
- Joanny-Philippe Lagrula
- Louis Boyer
- Odette Bancilhon

== See also ==
- List of astronomical observatories
- List of astronomical societies
- Lists of telescopes
