= Crommelin =

Crommelin may refer to:

== People ==
- Andrew Claude de la Cherois Crommelin (1865–1939), British astronomer
- Bill Crommelin (1903–1998), Australian politician
- Charles Crommelin (1717–1788), British colonial administrator, Governor of Bombay
- Henriette Willemina Crommelin (1870-1957), Dutch labour leader and temperance reformer
- John G. Crommelin (1902–1996), U.S. Navy officer
- May Crommelin (1850–1930), British writer
- Minard Fannie Crommelin (1881–1972), Australian conservationist

== Other uses ==
- 27P/Crommelin, comet
- Crommelin (lunar crater), impact crater on the Moon
- Crommelin (Martian crater), impact crater on Mars
- USS Crommelin, U.S. Navy ship
