= 28P/Neujmin =

Jupiter-family comet

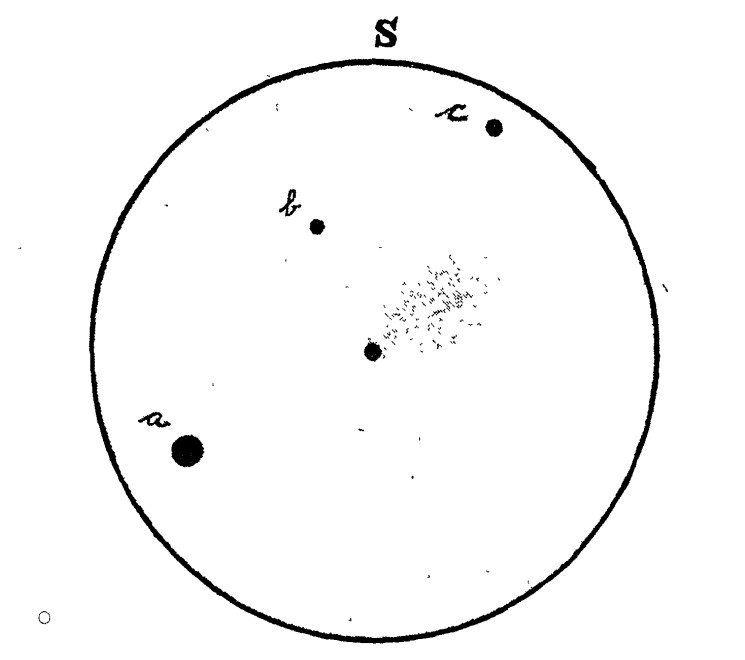
- Sketch of Comet Neujmin 1 as seen by Edward E. Barnard from the Yerkes Observatory on 9 September 1913.

Discovery
- Discovered by: Grigory Neujmin
- Discovery date: 3 September 1913

Designations
- MPC designation: P/1913 R2, P/1931 S1
- Alternative designations: Neujmin 1; 1913 III, 1931 I; 1948 XIII, 1966 VI; 1984 XIX

Orbital characteristics
- Epoch: 17 October 2024 (JD 2460600.5)
- Observation arc: 112.48 years
- Number of observations: 1,281
- Aphelion: 12.38 AU
- Perihelion: 1.585 AU
- Semi-major axis: 6.983 AU
- Eccentricity: 0.77297
- Orbital period: 18.45 years
- Inclination: 14.299°
- Longitude of ascending node: 346.39°
- Argument of periapsis: 347.47°
- Mean anomaly: 70.299°
- Last perihelion: 11 March 2021
- Next perihelion: 23 July 2039
- T_{Jupiter}: 2.168
- Earth MOID: 0.571 AU (85.4 million km)
- Jupiter MOID: 0.958 AU (143.3 million km)

Physical characteristics
- Dimensions: 19.4 km (12.1 mi)
- Synodic rotation period: 12.75±0.03 hours
- Geometric albedo: 0.025
- Spectral type: (V–R) = 0.454±0.05; (g−r) = 0.67±0.17; (r−y) = 0.41±0.19
- Comet total magnitude (M1): 13.2

28P/Neujmin, also known as Neujmin 1, is a large 21-km periodic comet that orbits the Sun once every 18 years. With a perihelion distance (closest approach to the Sun) of 1.6 AU (240 million km), this comet does not get closer than about 0.571 AU (85.4 million km) from Earth.

== Orbital and physical characteristics ==
Initial estimates of the size of its nucleus in 2001 is estimated to be 21.4 km (13.3 mi) in diameter with a low albedo of 0.025. A follow-up study in 2003 revised this figure to 19.4 km (12.1 mi). Since 28P has such a large nucleus, it became brighter than the 20th magnitude in early 2019, roughly 2 years before coming to perihelion. When it came to opposition in May 2020, when it was still 3.5 AU (520 million km) from the Sun, it had an apparent magnitude around 16.9. But during the 2021 perihelion passage the comet was on the opposite side of the Sun as the Earth. The comet is not known for bright outbursts of activity.

Archival data from the Subaru Telescope in 2021 revealed that while the measured colors of Neujmin 1's nucleus resembles those of D-type asteroids, its surface microstructure likely differs from them.

Numbered comets
Previous; 27P/Crommelin	28P/Neujmin	Next; 29P/Schwassmann–Wachmann
