= 273P/Pons–Gambart =

Periodic comet

273P/Pons-Gambart
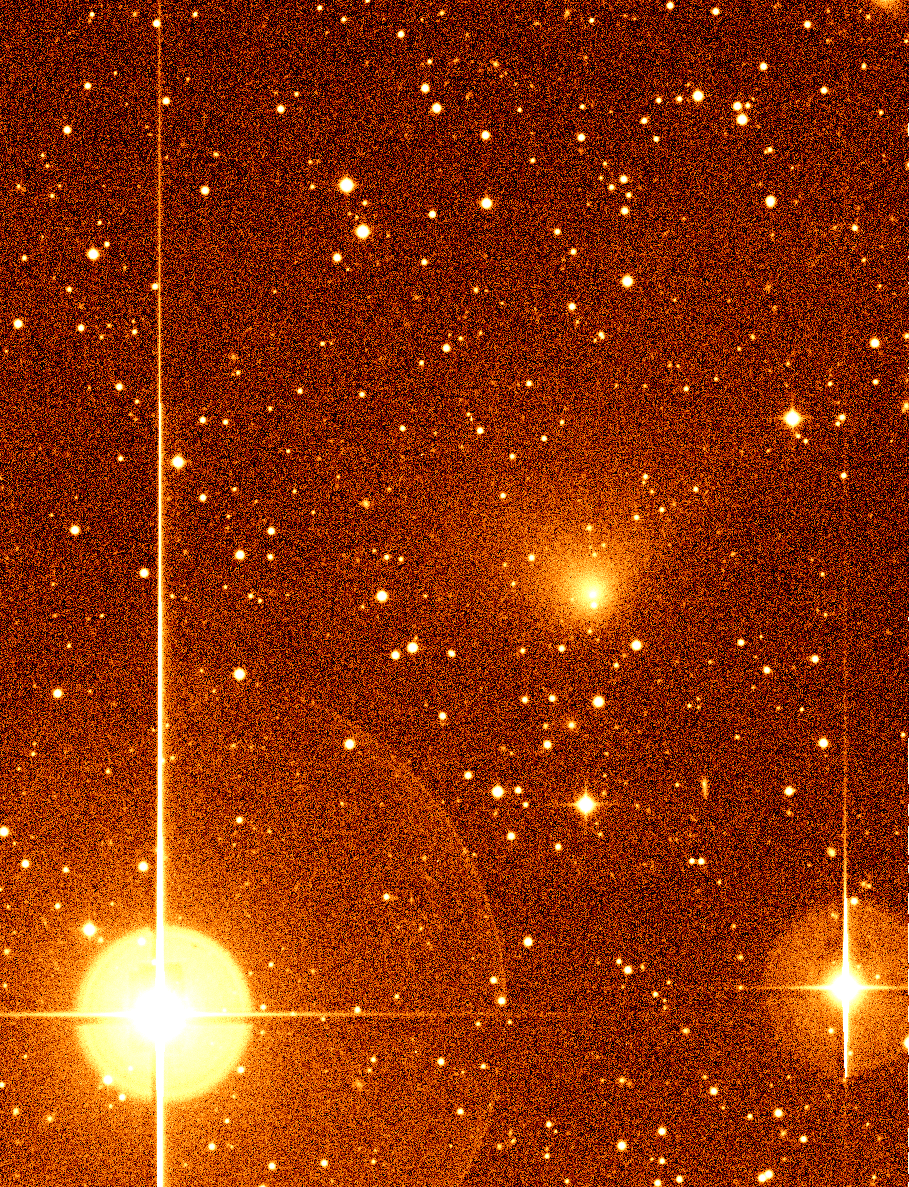
- Comet Pons–Gambart by the Palomar Transient Factory on 18 March 2013

Discovery
- Discovered by: Jean-Louis Pons; Jean-Félix Adolphe Gambart
- Discovery date: 21 June 1827

Designations
- MPC designation: C/1827 M1, P/2012 V4

Orbital characteristics
- Epoch: 25 February 2023 (JD 2460000.5)
- Observation arc: 187–904 years
- Earliest precovery date: May 1110?
- Number of observations: 1,185
- Aphelion: 63.147 AU
- Perihelion: 0.826 AU
- Semi-major axis: 31.986 AU
- Eccentricity: 0.97419
- Orbital period: 185.6 years
- Inclination: 136.75°
- Longitude of ascending node: 320.42°
- Argument of periapsis: 20.287°
- Mean anomaly: 20.259°
- Last perihelion: 19 December 2012
- Next perihelion: 9 August 2191
- T_{Jupiter}: -0.645
- Earth MOID: 0.172 AU
- Jupiter MOID: 1.389 AU
- Comet total magnitude (M1): 11.3
- Comet nuclear magnitude (M2): 14.9

273P/Pons–Gambart, also called Comet Pons-Gambart, is a periodic comet in a retrograde orbit first discovered on 21 June 1827 by Jean-Louis Pons and Jean-Félix Adolphe Gambart. It has a 186-year orbit and it fits the classical definition of a Halley-type comet (20 years < period < 200 years). Its last perihelion was in December 2012 and will next come to perihelion around August 2191.

== Orbit ==
The orbit was initially considered to be parabolic, but its orbit was recalculated in 1917 and it was found to be elliptical with an orbital period determined to be 64 years with 10 years uncertainly. The comet was considered lost until 7 November 2012, when amateur astronomer Rob Matson discovered a comet in images taken by SWAN instrument on board SOHO, and it was identified that the pre-recovery short-arc orbital calculations for Pons-Gambart were completely wrong because the comet only had a 1-month observation arc with poor data and that was the first perihelion after the 1827 apparition. It was last observed in April 2014 when it was 5.8 AU (870 million km) from the Sun.

The original name when first discovered was C/1827 M1. Before the 2012 return, when Comet Pons–Gambart was speculated to have a roughly 60 year orbit it was suspected of possibly being comet C/1110 K1.

Of all the numbered periodic comets, only 153P/Ikeya–Zhang has a longer orbital period.

== Possible meteor shower ==
Comet Pons–Gambart has been suggested as the parent body of the eta Eridaninds meteor shower, however comet C/1852 K1 (Chacornac) seems to be a better candidate.

== See also ==
- Marseilles Observatory
