= Jean-Louis Pons =

French astronomer (1761–1831)

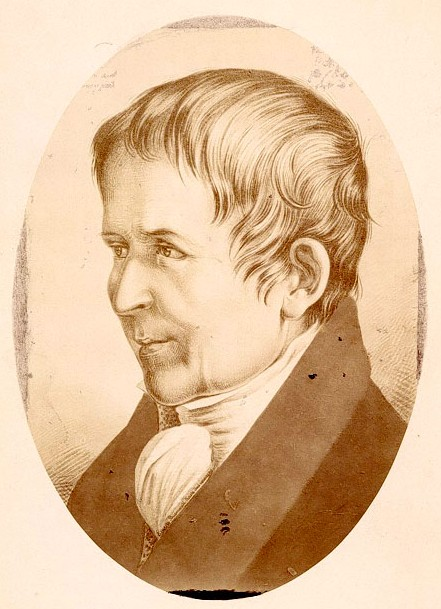
- Jean-Louis Pons
- Born: 24 December 1761; Peyre, France
- Died: 14 October 1831 (aged 69); Florence, Grand Duchy of Tuscany
- Awards: Lalande Prize (1818, 1820, 1827)
- Scientific career
- Fields: Astronomy

Jean-Louis Pons (24 December 1761 – 14 October 1831) was a French astronomer. Despite humble beginnings and being self-taught, he went on to become the greatest visual comet discoverer of all time: between 1801 and 1827 Pons discovered thirty-seven comets, more than any other person in history.

Pons worked at three observatories in his career, Marseille Observatory, where he was also trained, a short-lived observatory at Royal Park La Marlia in Tuscany, and finally at an observatory in Florence.

Pons's work supported some famous comet recoveries of the 19th century, including Encke's Comet and Crommelin's Comet. However, most of the comets he discovered had near-parabolic orbits and would not return for a time as long as several millennia.

== Early life ==
Pons was born in Peyre, Hautes-Alpes, to a poor family; he received little formal education. In 1789, he began working for the Marseille Observatory as a caretaker, and gradually gained some experience in assisting the astronomers with observations. He learned to make observations himself, showing a remarkable ability to remember star fields and note changes in them.

In his early astronomical career, the unassuming and trusting Pons was often the target of jokes perpetrated by more experienced astronomers. Franz Xaver von Zach once advised him to look for comets when sunspots were visible, though in doing so Zach may have inadvertently given Pons very good advice.

== Career as an astronomer ==
Pons made his first comet discovery, jointly attributed to Charles Messier, on 11 July 1801. He appears to have used telescopes and lenses of his own design; his "Grand Chercheur" ("Great Seeker") seems to have been an instrument with large aperture and short focal length, similar to a "comet seeker". However, he was not an especially diligent recorder of his observations, and his notes were often extremely vague. However, he found approximately 75% of all comets in this period.

In 1813 he gained the position of Assistant Astronomer at Marseille Observatory.

In 1819, Pons became the director of the new observatory at Marlia near Lucca, which he left in 1825 to teach astronomy at La Specola, in Florence. Around that time he accepted the opportunity to become Director of the Florence Observatory at the request of the Grand Duke of Tuscany.

He discovered five periodic comets, three of which, 7P/Pons–Winnecke, 12P/Pons–Brooks and 273P/Pons–Gambart, bear his name. One observed on 26 November 1818 was named Comet Encke (now 2P/Enke) after Johann Franz Encke, who calculated its orbit and its remarkably short (3.3 y) period (Encke, however, continued to refer to the comet as "Pons's Comet" or "Comet of Pons"). Pons also co-discovered the comet formerly known as "Pons–Coggia–Winnecke–Forbes" and today known as 27P/Crommelin after Andrew Crommelin, who calculated its orbit.

Pons received the French Academy of Sciences's Lalande Prize in 1818 for his discovery of three comets in that year. He won it again in 1820 (jointly with Joseph Nicollet) for further comet discoveries at Marlia and for an unmatched third time in 1827 (jointly with Jean-Félix Adolphe Gambart) for discovering another seven comets at the Florence observatory.

By 1827, Pons's eyesight had begun to fail, and he retired from observing altogether shortly before his death, on 14 October 1831. In his honour, a Moon crater was named after him.

== Record and legacy ==
Pons is noted for discovering 37 comets in the early 1800s. As of 1960 this was recognized as the greatest number of comets discovered by a single person.

Of the 37, 28 were determined to have parabolic orbits, and three did not have enough observation to determine an orbit. However, many of his discoveries fueled the discovery or recovery of what were later recognized as periodic comets, including Comet Pons–Brook and Comet Pons–Winnecke.

The comet 273P/Pons–Gambart, which Pons had observed in 1827, was rediscovered in 2012.
