= 27P/Crommelin =

Halley-type comet

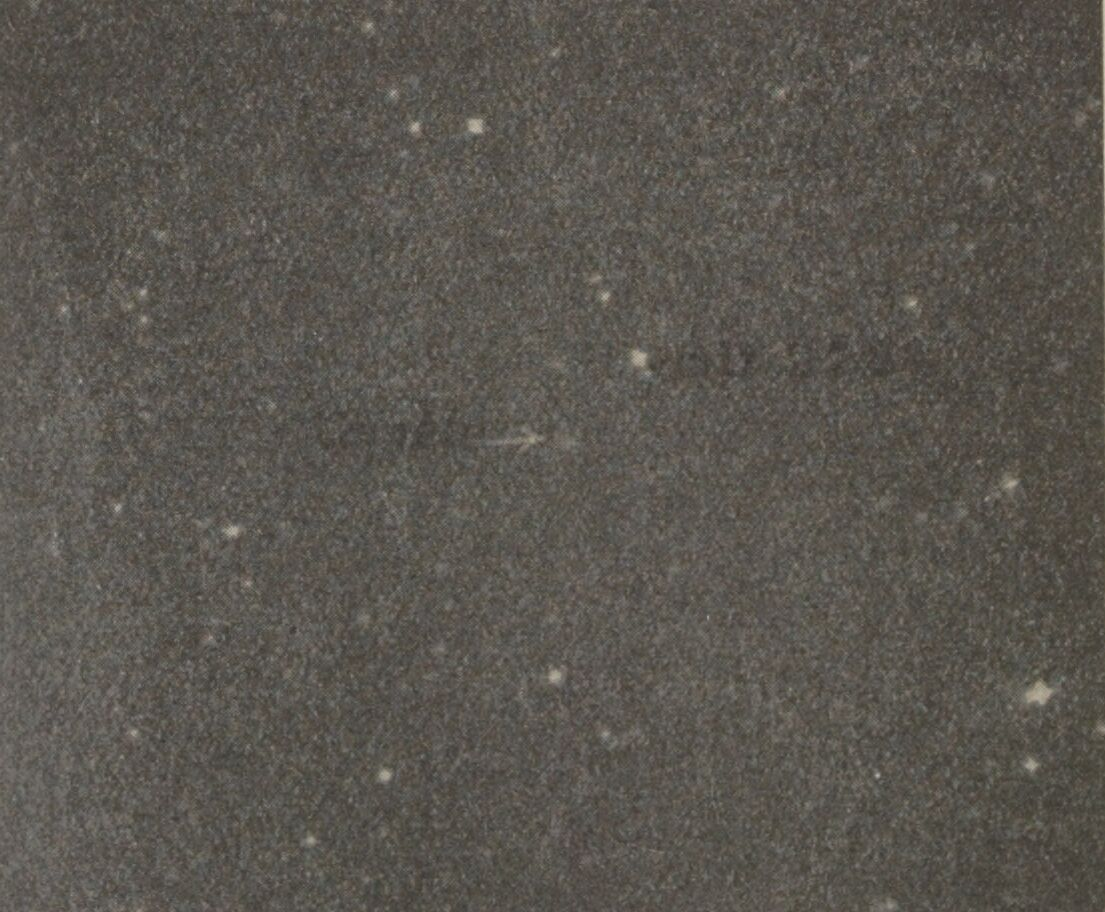
- Comet Crommelin photographed by Ferdinand Quénisset on 28 October 1928

Discovery
- Discovered by: Jean-Louis Pons; Andrew C. D. Crommelin; (recognition of periodicity)
- Discovery date: 23 February 1818

Designations
- MPC designation: P/1818 D1, P/1873 V1; P/1928 W1, P/1956 S1
- Alternative designations: 1818 I, 1873 VII, 1928 III; 1956 VI, 1984 IV; 1873g, 1928b, 1956g; 1983n

Orbital characteristics
- Epoch: 18 July 2011 (JD 2455760.5)
- Observation arc: 193.92 years
- Number of observations: 497
- Aphelion: 17.659 AU
- Perihelion: 0.748 AU
- Semi-major axis: 9.204 AU
- Eccentricity: 0.91874
- Orbital period: 27.922 years
- Inclination: 28.96°
- Longitude of ascending node: 250.64°
- Argument of periapsis: 195.98°
- Mean anomaly: 359.41°
- Last perihelion: 3 August 2011
- Next perihelion: 27 May 2039
- T_{Jupiter}: 1.481
- Earth MOID: 0.229 AU
- Jupiter MOID: 1.009 AU

Physical characteristics
- Mean diameter: < 12±3 km (Note: Upper limit value of the nucleus diameter derived from observations while the comet was 5.39 AU (806 million km) from the Sun.)
- Comet total magnitude (M1): 12.7
- Comet nuclear magnitude (M2): 16.3

Comet Crommelin, also known as Comet Pons-Coggia-Winnecke-Forbes, is a periodic comet with an orbital period of almost 28 years. It fits the classical definition of a Halley-type comet with (20 years < period < 200 years). It is named after the British astronomer Andrew C. D. Crommelin who calculated its orbit in 1930. It is one of only five known comets that are not named after their discoverer(s) (Note: The other four comets not named after their discoverers were: 1P/Halley, 2P/Encke, D/1770 L1 (Lexell) and X/1882 K1 (Tewfik).) It next comes to perihelion (closest approach to the Sun) around 27 May 2039 when it will be near a maximum near-perihelion distance from Earth.

== Observational history ==
The first observation was by Jean-Louis Pons (Marseille, France) on February 23, 1818, he followed the comet until February 27 but was prevented further by bad weather. Johann Franz Encke attempted to calculate the orbit but was left with very large errors.

In 1872, John R. Hind produced a rough orbital calculation and observed it was close to that of Comet Biela, based on these observations, Edmund Weiss later speculated it may have been part of Biela's comet.

The next observation was on November 10, 1873, by Jérôme E. Coggia (Marseille, France), and again on November 11 by Friedrich A. T. Winnecke (Strasbourg, France), but it was lost by November 16. Weiss and Hind took up the calculations and tried to match it again with the 1818 appearance.

A third discovery was by Alexander F. I. Forbes (Cape Town, South Africa) on 19 November 1928, and confirmed by Harry E. Wood (Union Observatory, South Africa) on November 21. It was Crommelin who eventually established the orbit and finally linked the 1818 (Pons) and 1873 (Coggia-Winnecke) comets to it (also see Lost comet).

On its latest return, 27P/Crommelin was recovered on May 12, 2011, at apparent magnitude 18.7 and peaked at magnitude 10.7 at perihelion on August 3. 27P/Crommelin was last observed in January 2012, and passed about 1.5 AU (220 million km) from Saturn on 11 July 2015.

The next perihelion will be on 27 May 2039. Near perihelion the comet will be 0.74 AU from the Sun and 1.73 AU from Earth. This is about as far from Earth as the comet can get during perihelion.

On 22 December 2120, it will pass 0.297 AU (44.4 million km) from Earth.

== Notes ==
Numbered comets
Previous; 26P/Grigg–Skjellerup	27P/Crommelin	Next; 28P/Neujmin
