= Henriette Willemina Crommelin =

Dutch social reformer (1870–1957)

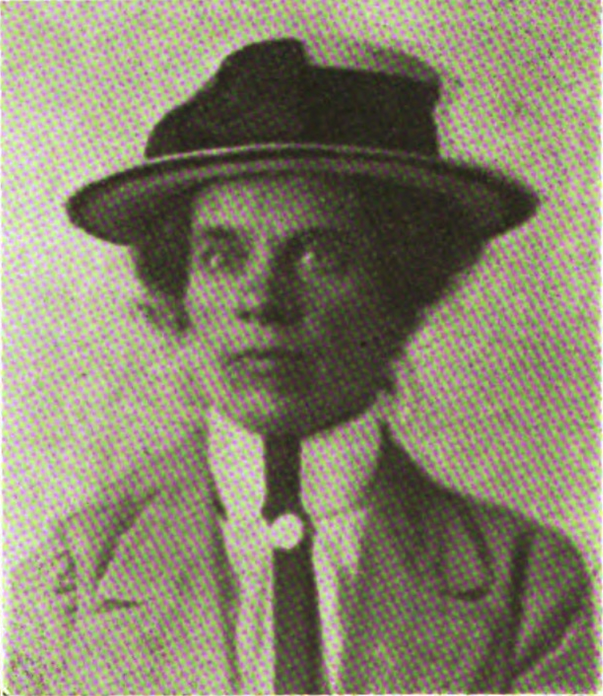
Henriette Willemina Crommelin

Henriette Willemina Crommelin (7 December 1870 – 19 August 1957) was a Dutch labor leader and temperance reformer. She was also a suffragist and a member of a suffrage society.

== Biography ==
Henriette Willemina Crommelin born in Dordrecht, on 7 December 1870, to Marinus Crommelin (1838-1907) and Sophia Agatha Wilhelmina Van Dielen Crommelin (1837-1919). Her older sister, Louise, died before her third birthday; she had a younger sister, Claude.

She was educated by private tutors. At the age of 18, she came for a year to Westfield College, London, where she took an abstinence pledge that was to direct her future.

She returned to the Netherlands and in 1891, helped found the Utrecht branch of the Nationale Christen Geheelonthouders Vereeniging ("Dutch National Christian Temperance Federation"). She was a secretary for the Utrecht district committee, and then became a member of the Federation's executive body. In 1896, Crommelin spoke for the first time in public, and her success encouraged her to continue and incited other women to follow her example.

Serving as treasurer, Crommelin was a member of the Executive Committee of the Thirteenth International Congress Against Alcoholism (The Hague, 1911). In September, 1920, she attended the Fifteenth International Congress Against Alcoholism, at Washington, D.C., as one of the Dutch delegates.

She translated several English books on sociological and religious subjects into Dutch.

Crommelin lived in Zeist, where she was an alderman. She died there on 19 August 1957.
