= Andrew Claude de la Cherois Crommelin =

Irish astronomer (1865–1939)

Andrew Claude de la Cherois Crommelin (6 February 1865 – 20 September 1939) was an astronomer of French and Huguenot descent who was born in Cushendun, County Antrim, Ireland. He was educated in England at Marlborough College and Trinity College, Cambridge. After a spell teaching at Lancing College he found permanent employment at the Royal Greenwich Observatory in 1891. He joined the Royal Astronomical Society in 1888 and was its president from 1929–1931. In 1895 he joined the British Astronomical Association and was president from 1904–1906, directing its comet section 1898–1901 and 1907–1938.

In 1910 for their studies of Halley’s Comet Crommelin and Philip Herbert Cowell jointly received the Prix Jules Janssen from the Société astronomique de France. For this work they also received the Lindemann prize of the Astronomische Gesellschaft in Germany.

In 1914 Crommelin published an introductory book on astronomy “The Star World”.

Crommelin had four children, of whom two died in a climbing accident on Pillar Rock, Ennerdale, in 1933. The de la Cherois line was succeeded through Crommelin's daughter Andrina. The author May Crommelin was one of Andrew’s cousins.

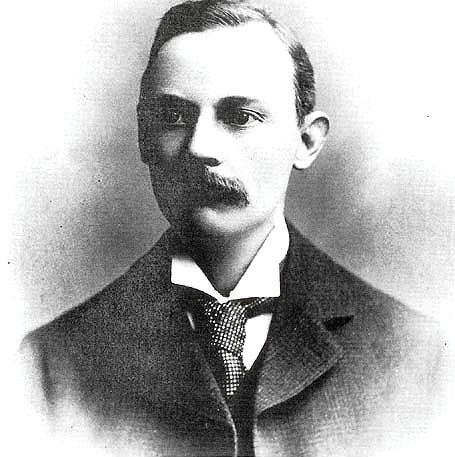
Andrew Claude de la Cherois Crommelin.

An expert on comets, his calculation of orbits of previously identified Comet Pons 1818 II, Comet Coggia-Winnecke 1873 VII, and Comet Forbes 1928 III in 1929, showed that these were one and the same periodic comet. It thus received the rather unwieldy name "Comet Pons-Coggia-Winnecke-Forbes". In 1948, he was posthumously honored when the comet was renamed after him alone (in modern nomenclature, it is designated 27P/Crommelin). This is similar to the case of Comet Encke, where the periodic comet is named after the person who determined the orbit rather than the possibly-multiple discoverers and re-discoverers at each apparition. In 1937 Crommelin and Mary Proctor jointly published a book entitled "Comets: Their Nature, Origin, and Place in the Science of Astronomy”.

Crommelin took part in several solar eclipse expeditions including those of 1896, 1900 and 1905. In 1919 he went to Sobral, in Brazil, and measured the deflection of light from a star caused by the gravitational field of the Sun during a solar eclipse. The results from these observations were crucial in providing confirmation of the General Theory of Relativity, which Albert Einstein had proposed in 1916.

== Named after Crommelin ==
- Comet 27P/Crommelin
- Crommelin (lunar crater)
- Crommelin (Martian crater)
- Asteroid 1899 Crommelin
