= May Crommelin =

Anglo-Irish novelist and travel writer

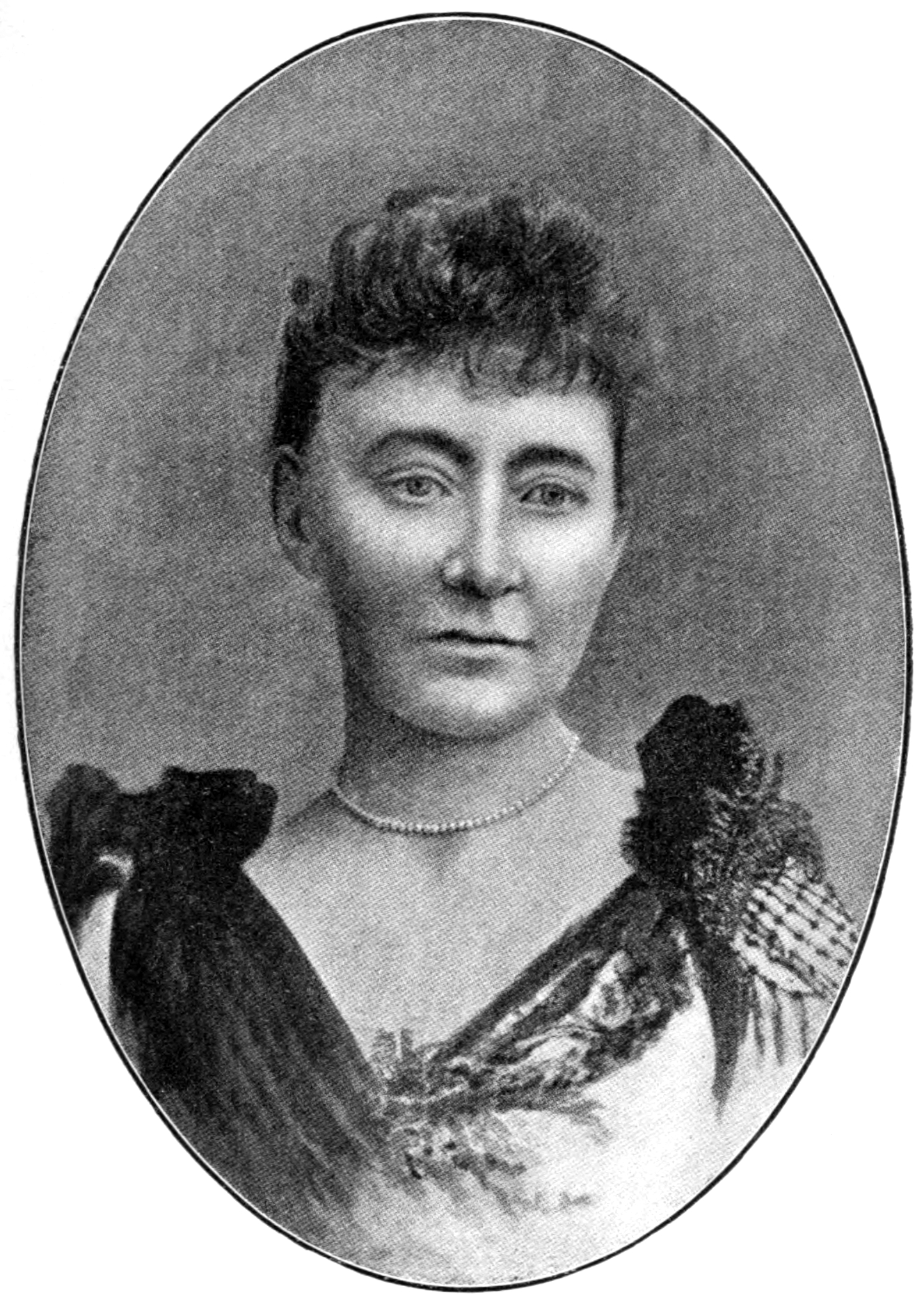
- Born: 1850
- Died: 10 August 1930
- Occupation: Novelist

1899 poster advertising Bay Ronald, a "thrilling domestic drama", with photograph of an oil portrait of May de la Cherois Crommelin.

Maria Henrietta de la Cherois Crommelin, known as May de la Cherois Crommelin, (1850–1930) was a novelist and travel writer born in Ulster, Ireland at Carrowdore Castle in County Down. On the death of her brother, Frederick Armand, who succeeded their father Samuel Arthur Hill de la Cherois Crommelin, J.P. D.L. as head of the family, May and her sisters Evelyn and Caroline (Mrs Robert Barton Shaw), were recognised jointly as heads of the family of de la Cherois Crommelin.

While growing up, she and her family often lived elsewhere because of the political situation at home, and Crommelin was educated by governesses. The family moved to England in the 1880s and after the death of her traditionalist father in 1885 she lived independently in her own flat in London. Though her family were "French gentry"- the Crommelins being in possession of considerable property at Armandcourt in Picardy and created Seigneurs de Camas- and descended from the Huguenot linen merchant Louis Crommelin, they were not at all wealthy, and Crommelin earned a living by writing. One of her cousins was the astronomer Andrew Claude de la Cherois Crommelin.

== Writing ==
She travelled widely, going to the Andes (which she described in her 1896 work Over the Andes From the Argentine to Chili and Peru), the West Indies, North Africa and elsewhere. She wrote 42 novels, which were often based upon her travels. Her first, Queenie, was published in 1874. Orange Lily of 1879 is set in Ulster, where she was born. In 1884 she published Joy, set on Dartmoor where she first lived after coming to England; and her Cross-Roads of 1890 relies on her knowledge of France and Italy. Her work met with mixed reviews: for instance Goblin Gold (1885) was disparaged at the time. She also contributed travel pieces and short stories to magazines like The Idler.
