= Crommelin (Martian crater) =

Crater on Mars

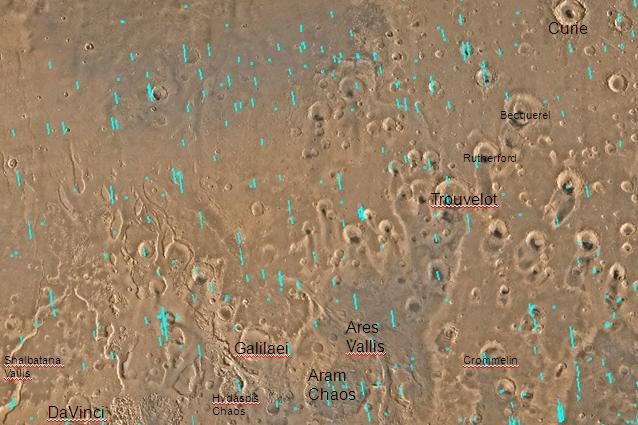
- Quadrangle map of Oxia Palus labeled with major features. This quadrangle contains many collapsed areas of Chaos and many outflow channels (old river valleys). Crommelin crater is found at the lower right. Crommelin contains a large mound that shows dozens of regularly spaced layers. These layers are similar to layers in other major craters such as Gale Crater and Henry Crater.
- Planet: Mars
- Coordinates: 5.1°N 10.2°W
- Quadrangle: Oxia Palus
- Eponym: Andrew C. Crommelin, a British astronomer (1865–1939)

Crommelin is an impact crater in the Oxia Palus quadrangle of Mars, located at 5.1°N latitude and 10.2°W longitude. It is 113.9 km in diameter. It was named after British astronomer Andrew Crommelin (1865–1939); the name was approved in 1973 by the International Astronomical Union (IAU) Working Group for Planetary System Nomenclature (WGPSN).

== Description ==
The crater shows many layers. Many places on Mars show rocks arranged in layers. Rock can form layers in a variety of ways. Volcanoes, wind, or water can produce layers. Groundwater may have been involved in the formation of layers in some places.

Parts of Crommelin crater display many thin layers. These may reflect different climates in the past—some of which were much wetter.

Many craters once were lakes. Because some crater floors show deltas, we know that water was present for some time. Dozens of deltas have been spotted on Mars. Deltas form when sediment is washed in from a stream entering a quiet body of water. It takes some time to form a delta, so the presence of a delta means that water was there for a time, maybe for many years. Primitive organisms may have developed in such lakes; hence, some craters may be prime targets for the search for evidence of life on the Red Planet.

The density of impact craters is used to determine the surface ages of Mars and other solar system bodies. The older the surface, the more craters present. Crater shapes can reveal the presence of ground ice.

The area around craters may be rich in minerals. On Mars, heat from the impact melts ice in the ground. Water from the melting ice dissolves minerals and then deposits them in cracks or faults that were produced with the impact. This process, called hydrothermal alteration, is a major way in which ore deposits are produced. The area around Martian craters may be rich in useful ores for the future colonization of Mars.

== Gallery ==
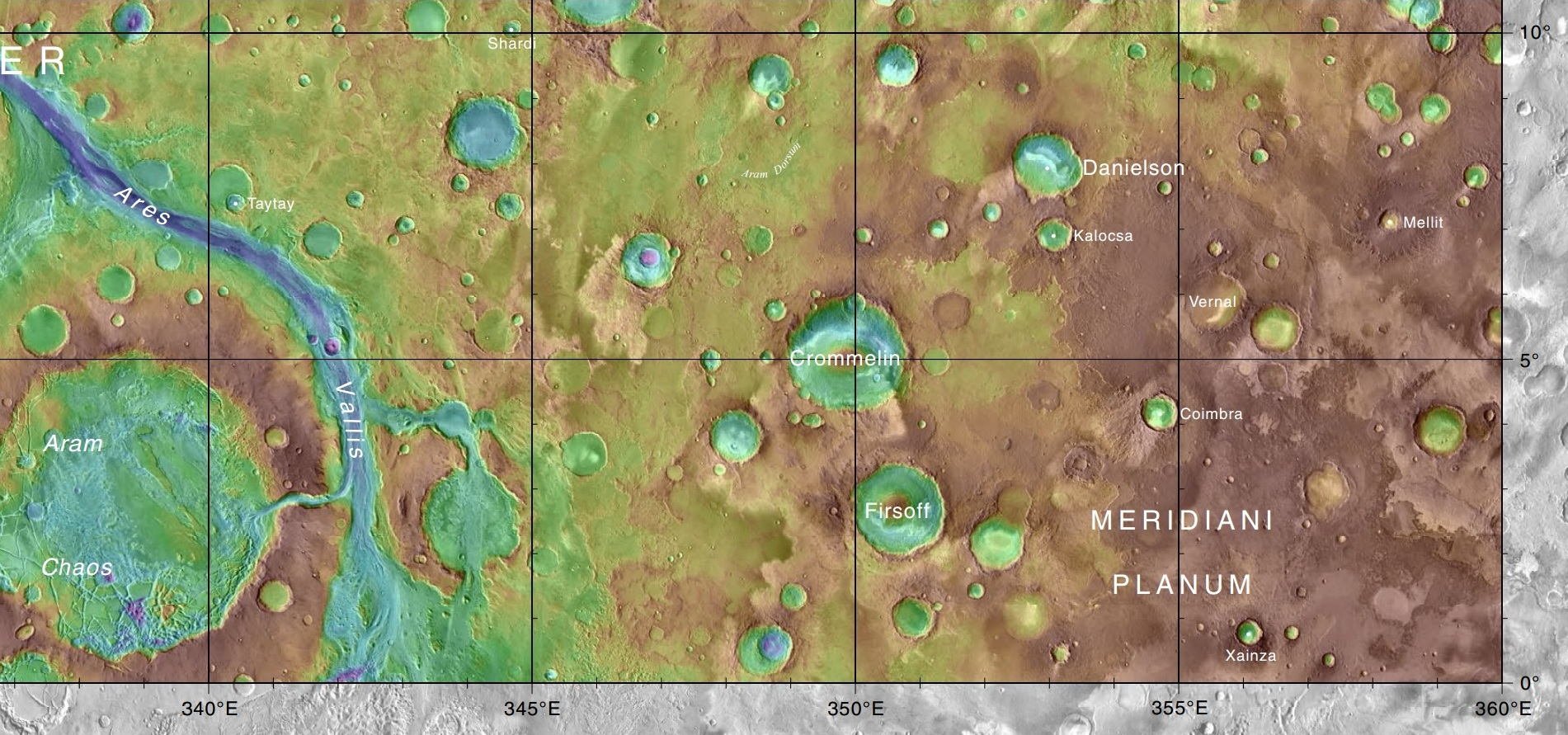
MOLA map showing Crommelin crater and other nearby craters. Colors indicate elevations.

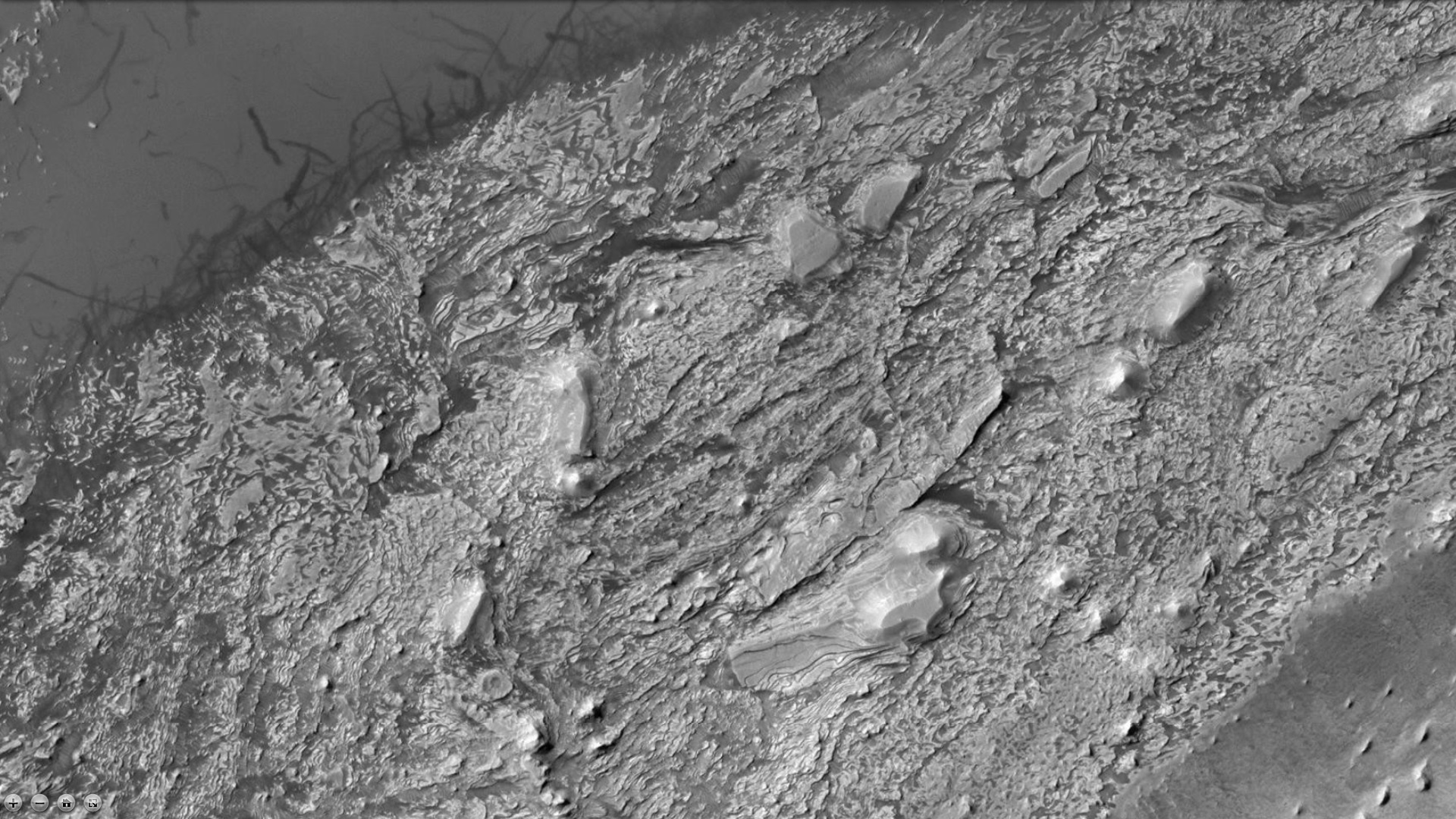
Crommelin crater showing layers and dust devil tracks, as seen by CTX camera (on Mars Reconnaissance Orbiter). Note: this is an enlargement of a previous image of Crommelin crater.

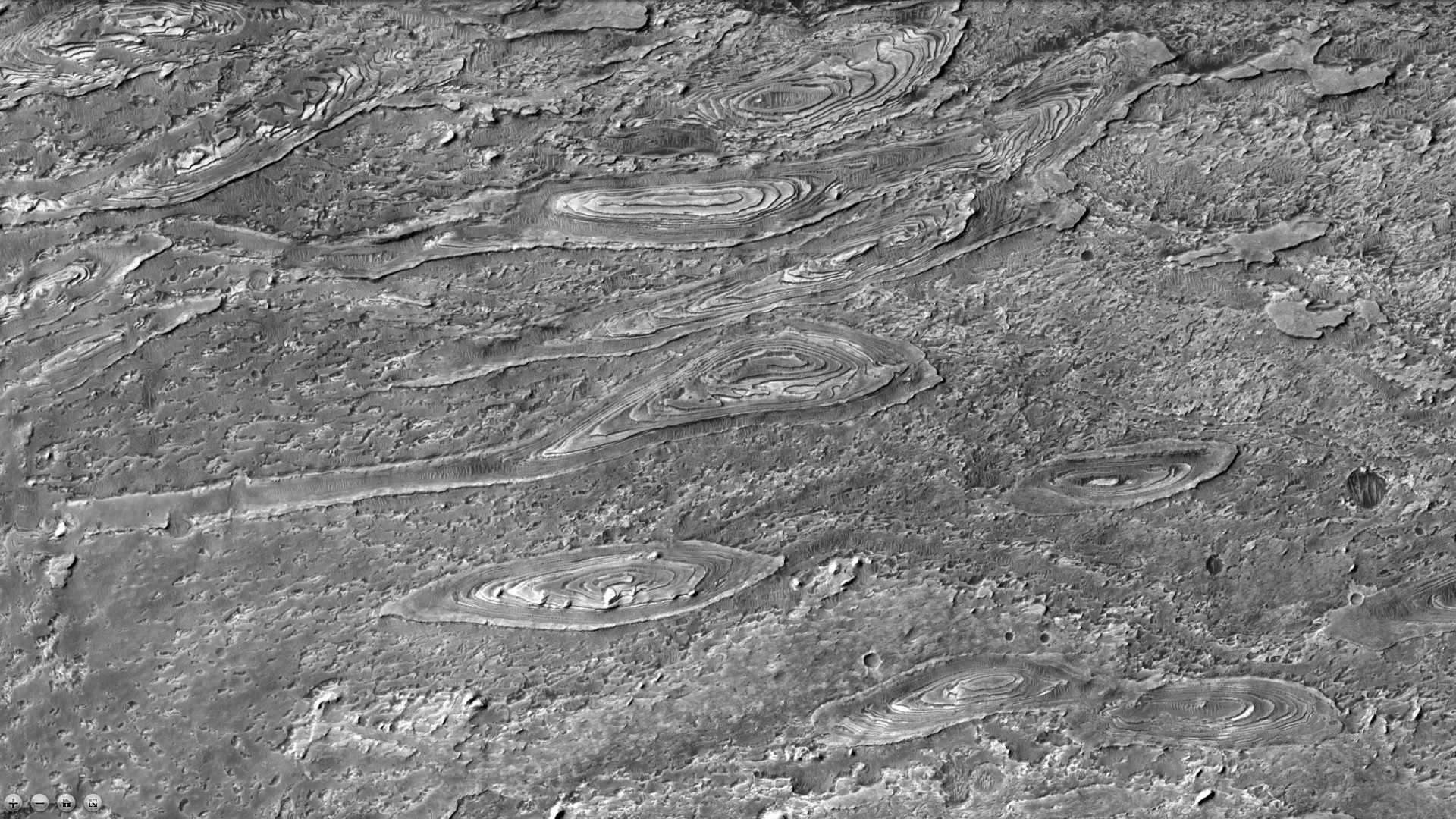
Crommelin crater showing layers arranged in the shape of ovals, as seen by CTX camera. Note: this is an enlargement of a previous image.

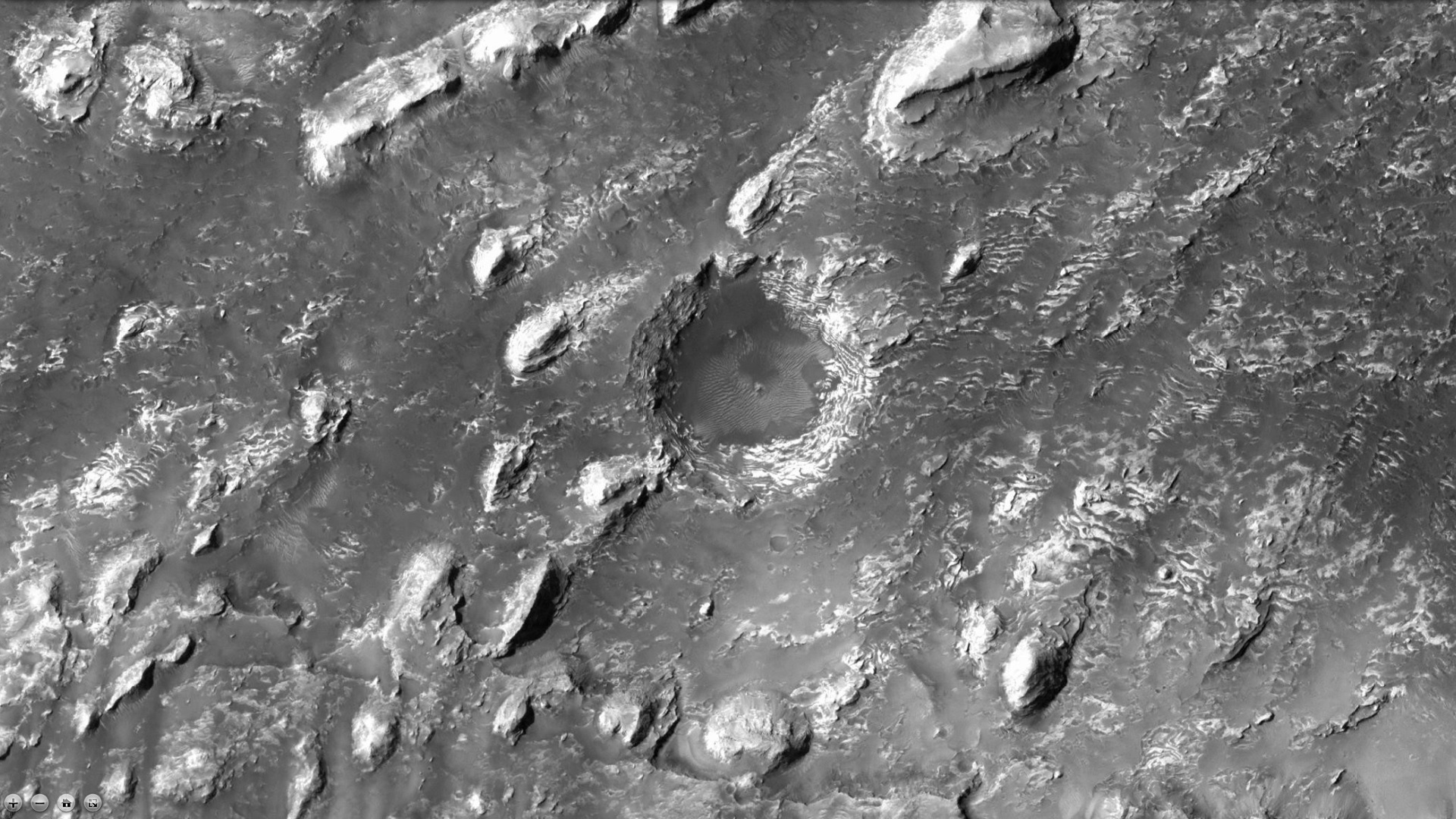
Crommelin crater showing layers in buttes and inside a small crater, as seen by CTX camera. Note: this is an enlargement of a previous image.

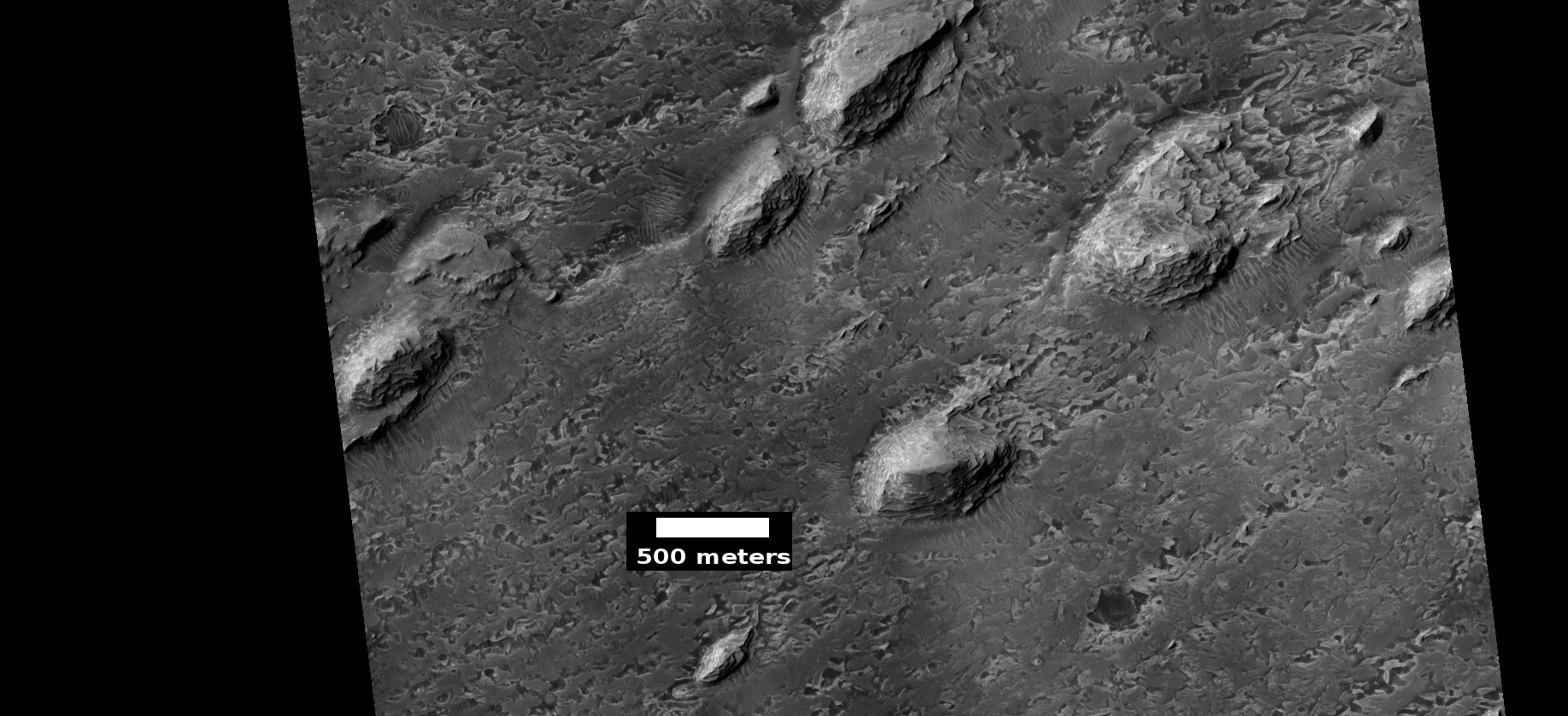
Crommelin crater, showing layers, as seen by HiRISE

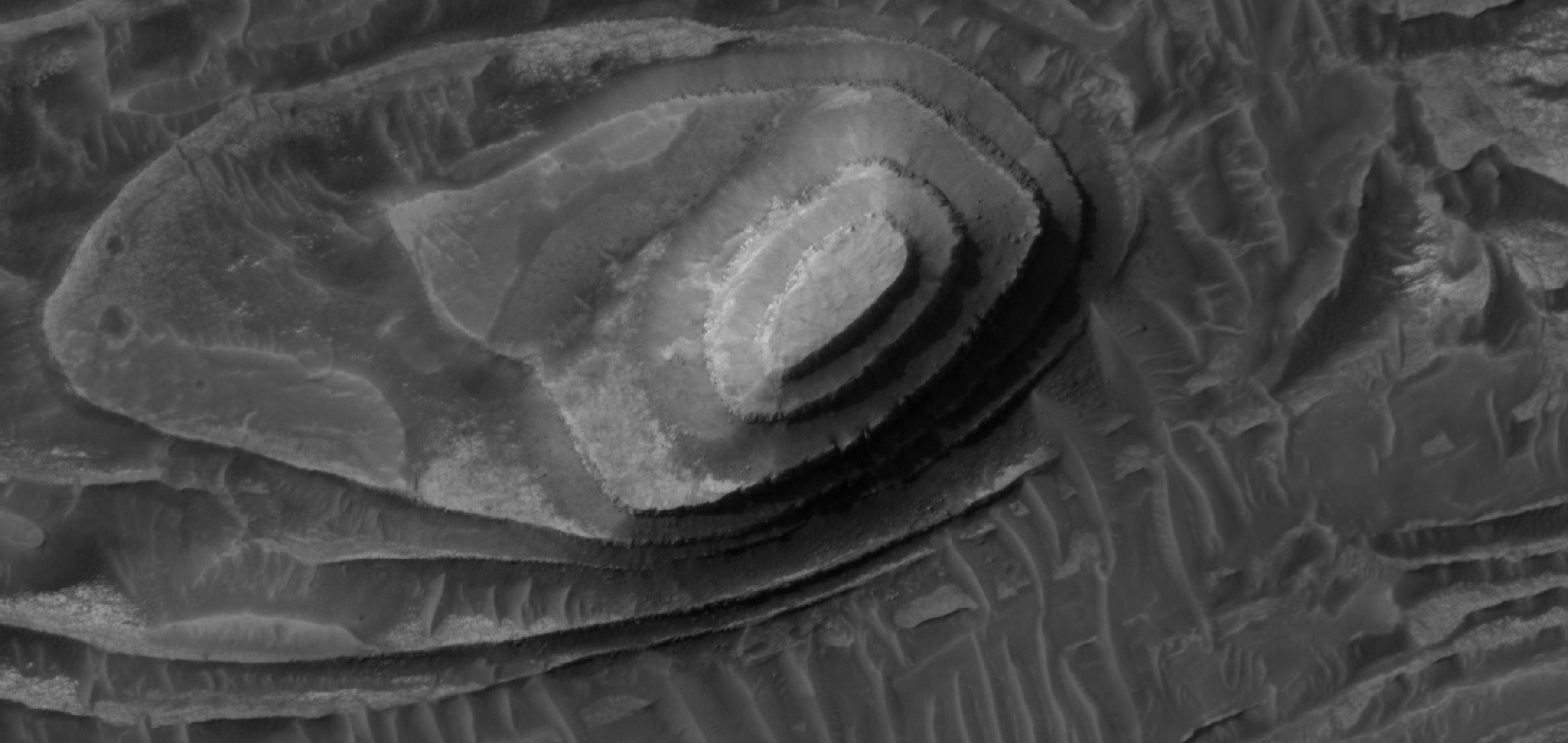
Butte in Crommelin crater, as seen by HiRISE under HiWish program.

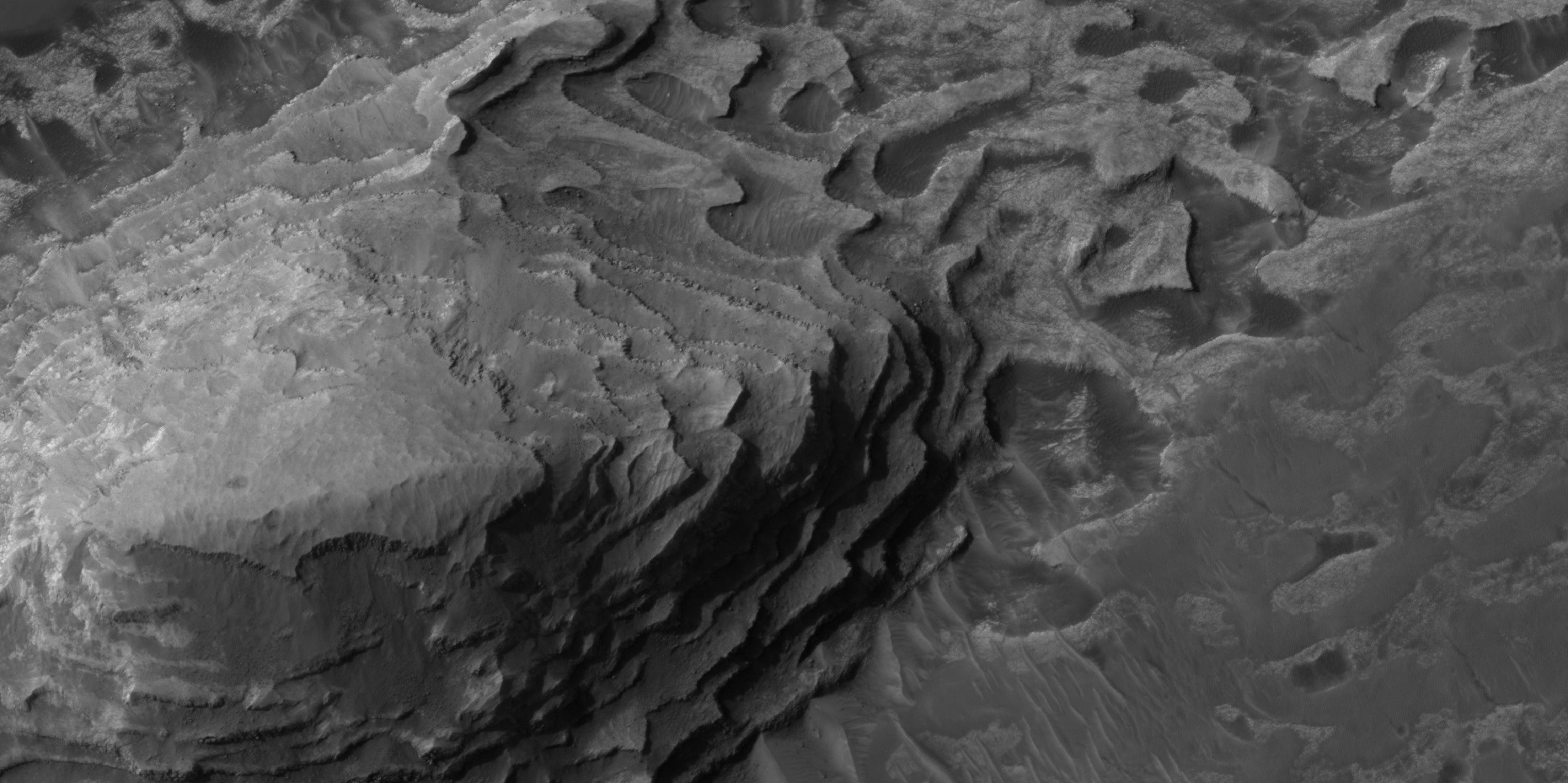
Layers in Crommelin crater, as seen by HiRISE.

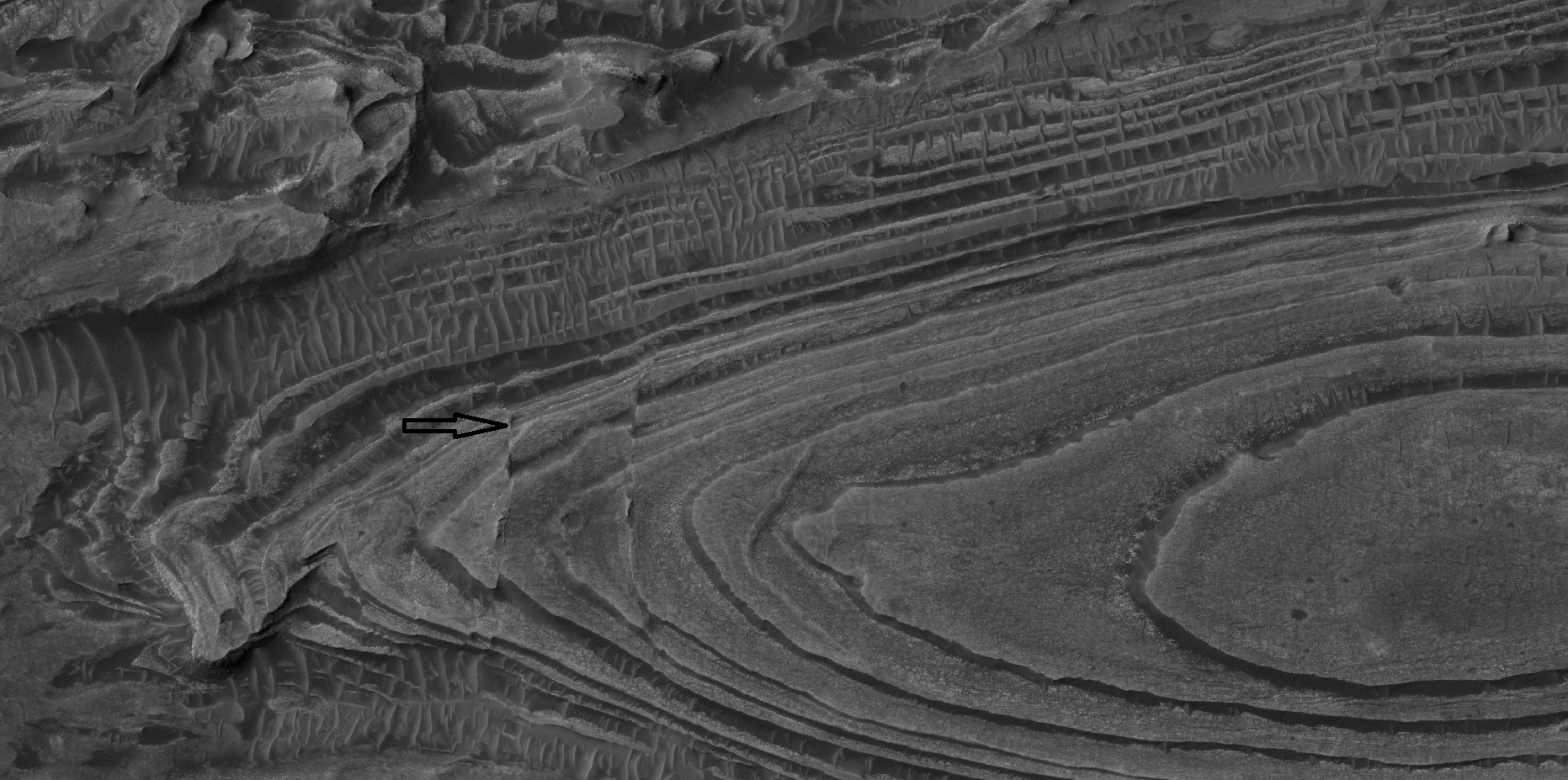
Layers in Crommelin crater, as seen by HiRISE. Arrow indicates fault.

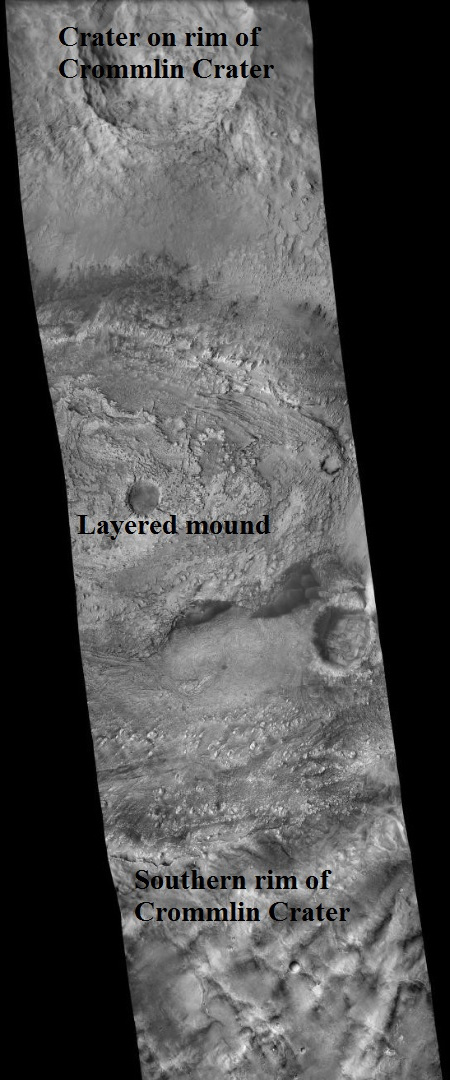
Crommelin crater with important parts labeled, as seen by CTX camera.

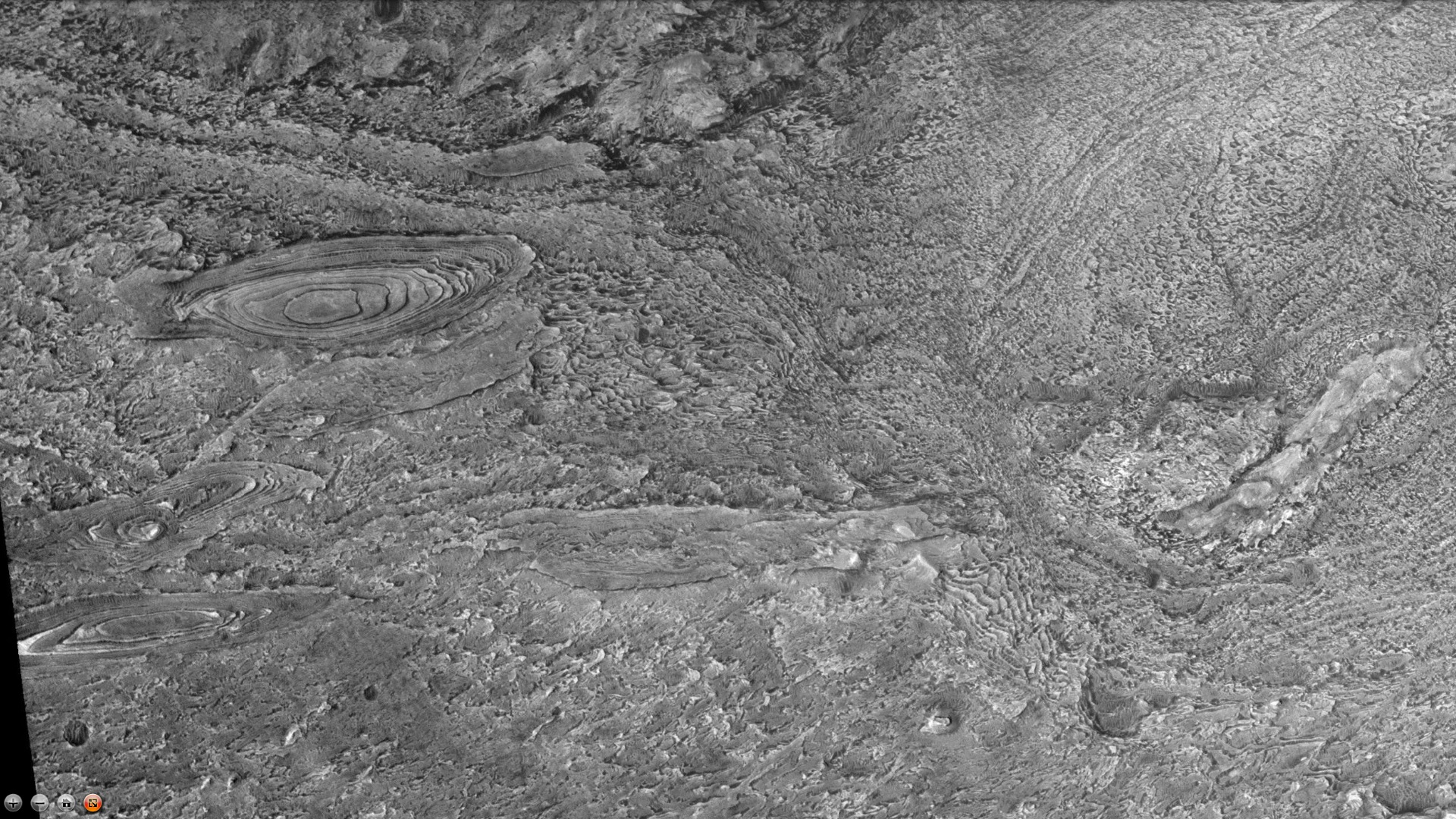
Layers in mound of Crommelin crater, as seen by CTX camera. Note: this is an enlargement of previous image.

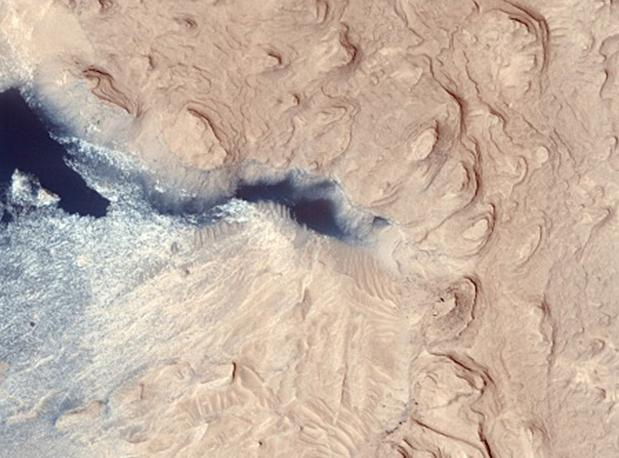
Crommelin crater layered deposit, as seen by HiRISE. The color blue in the photo is a false color.

Crommelin crater contains a layered mound that is higher than its rim. This drawing shows how it was formed when much of the material was eroded away.
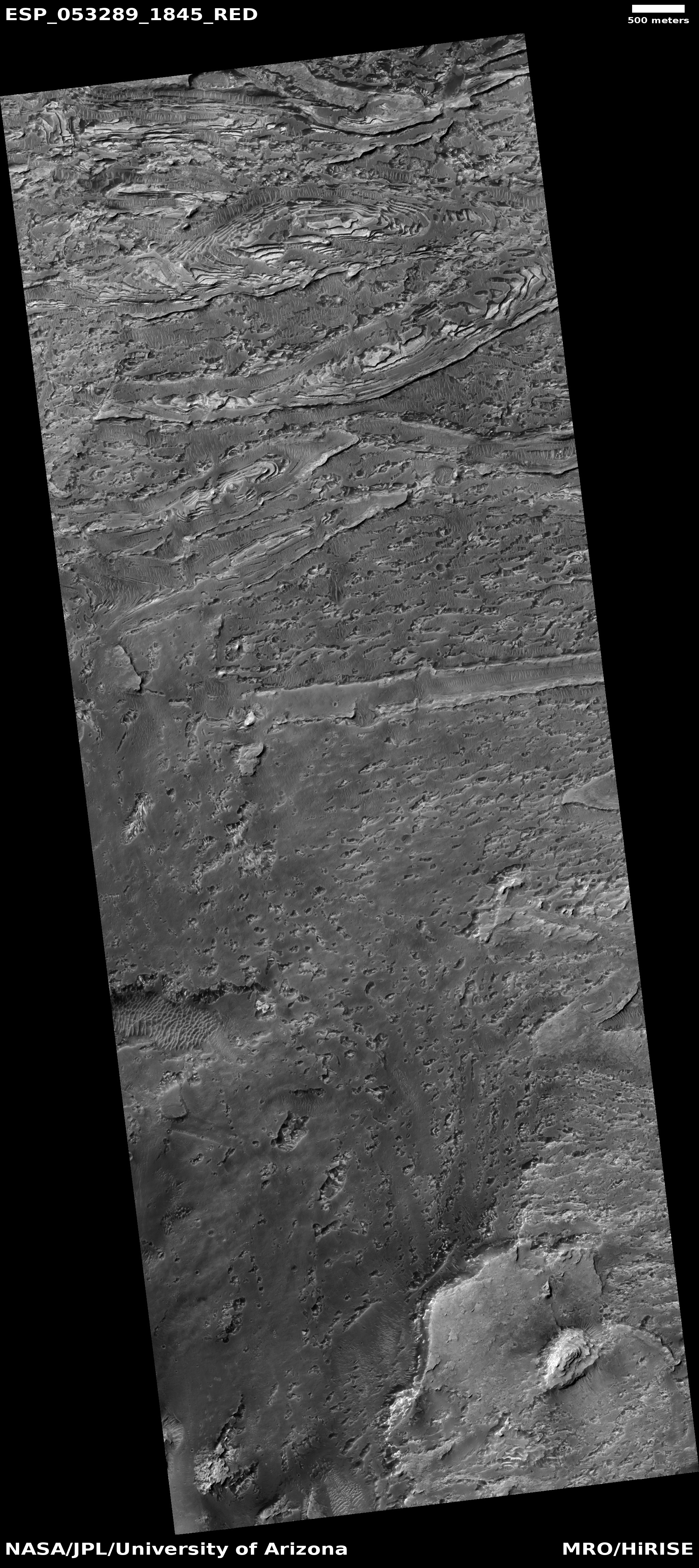
Wide view of layers in Crommelin crater, as seen by HiRISE. Parts of this photo are enlarged in following images.

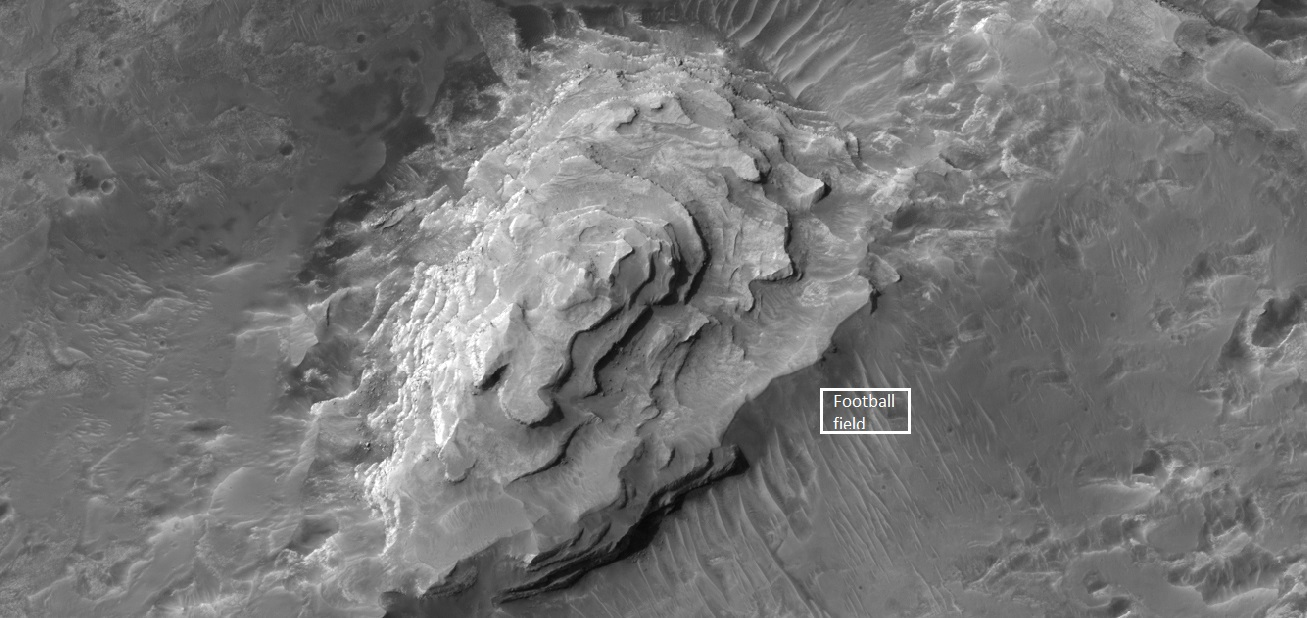
Close view of layered mound in Crommelin crater, as seen by HiRISE. Box indicates the size of a football field for scale.

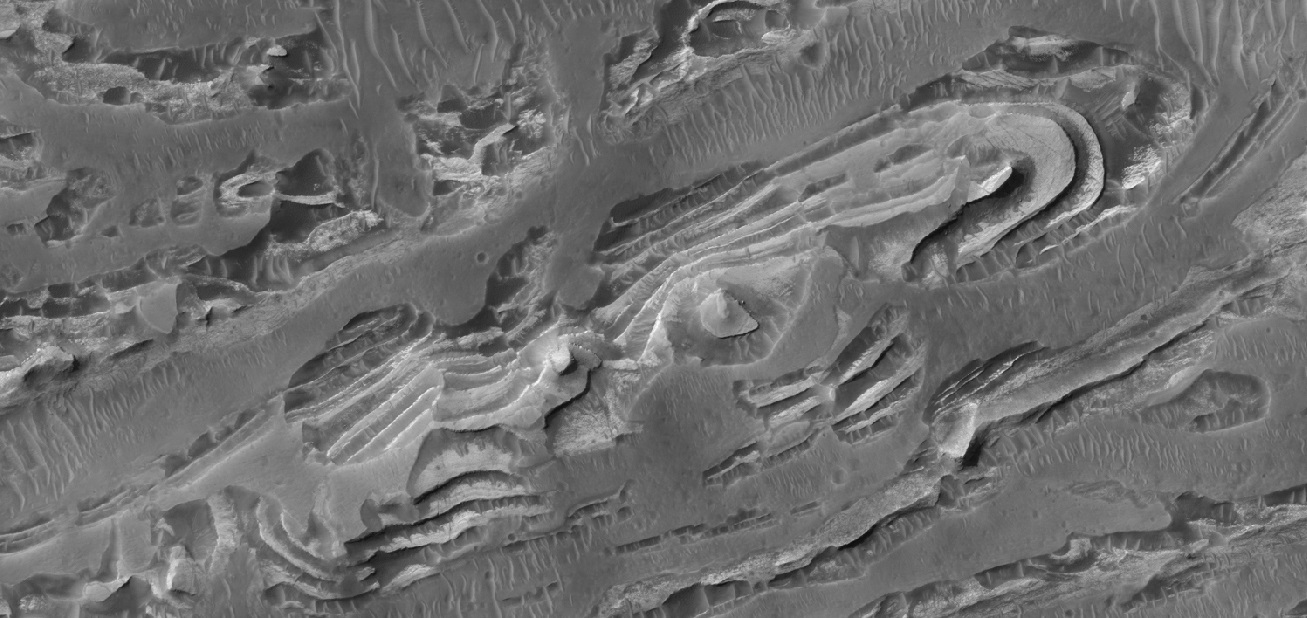
Close view of layers

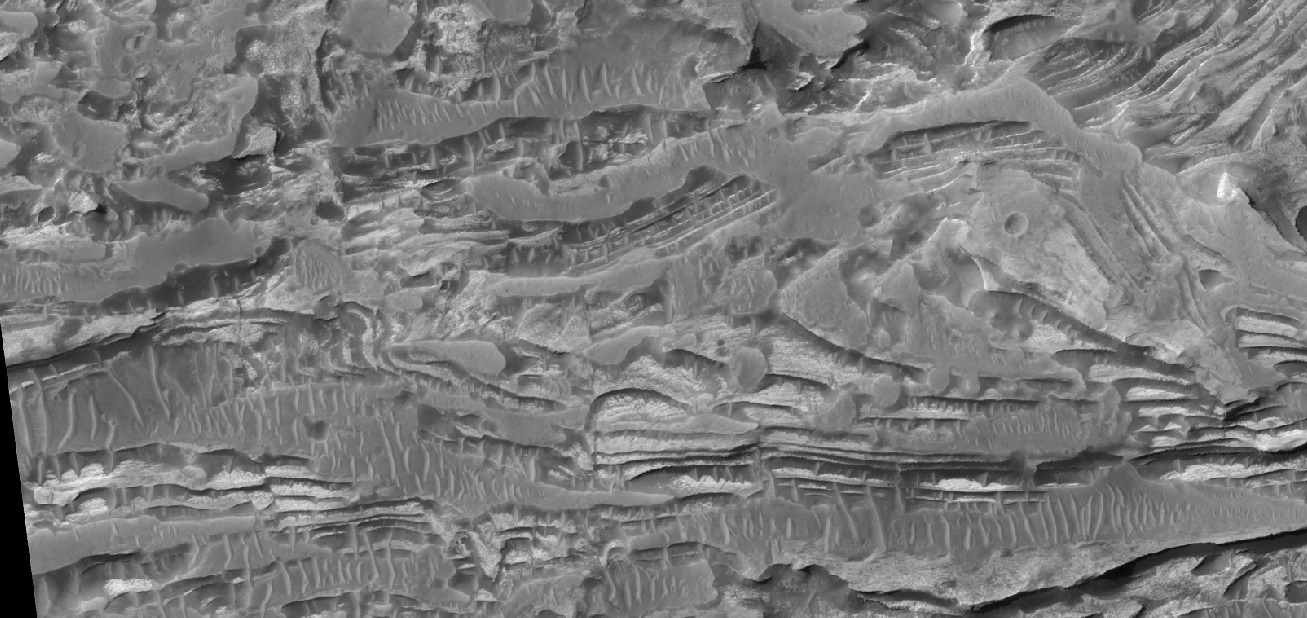
Close view of layers

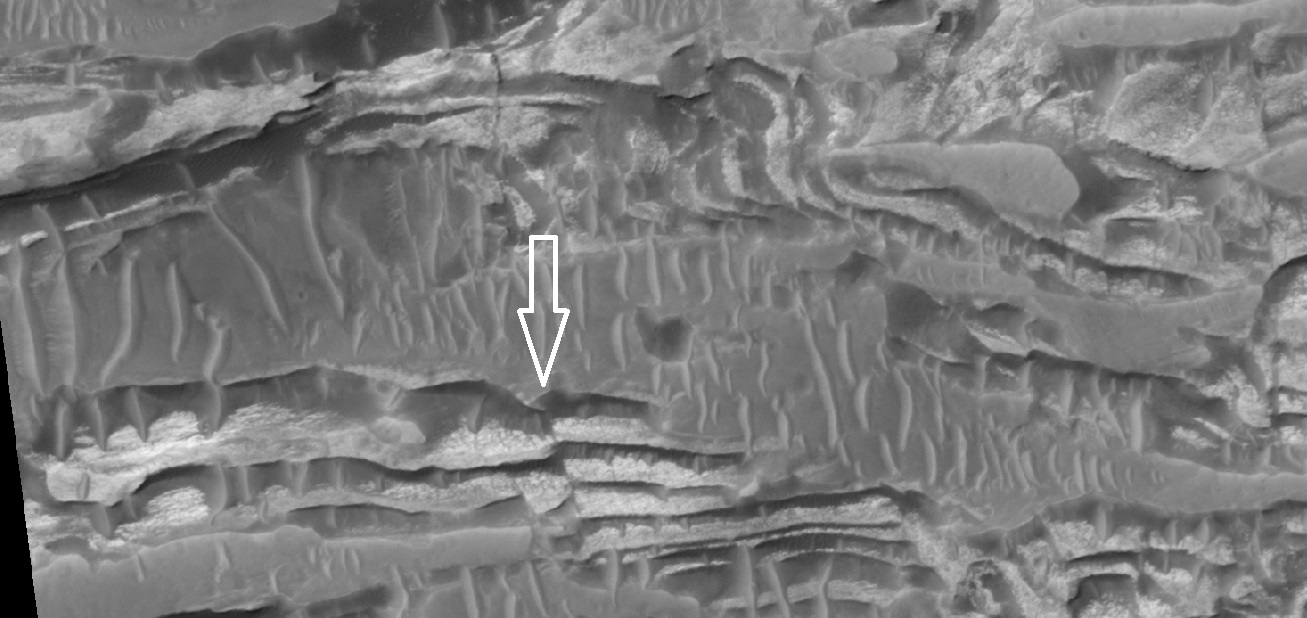
Close view of layers. Arrow points to a fault.

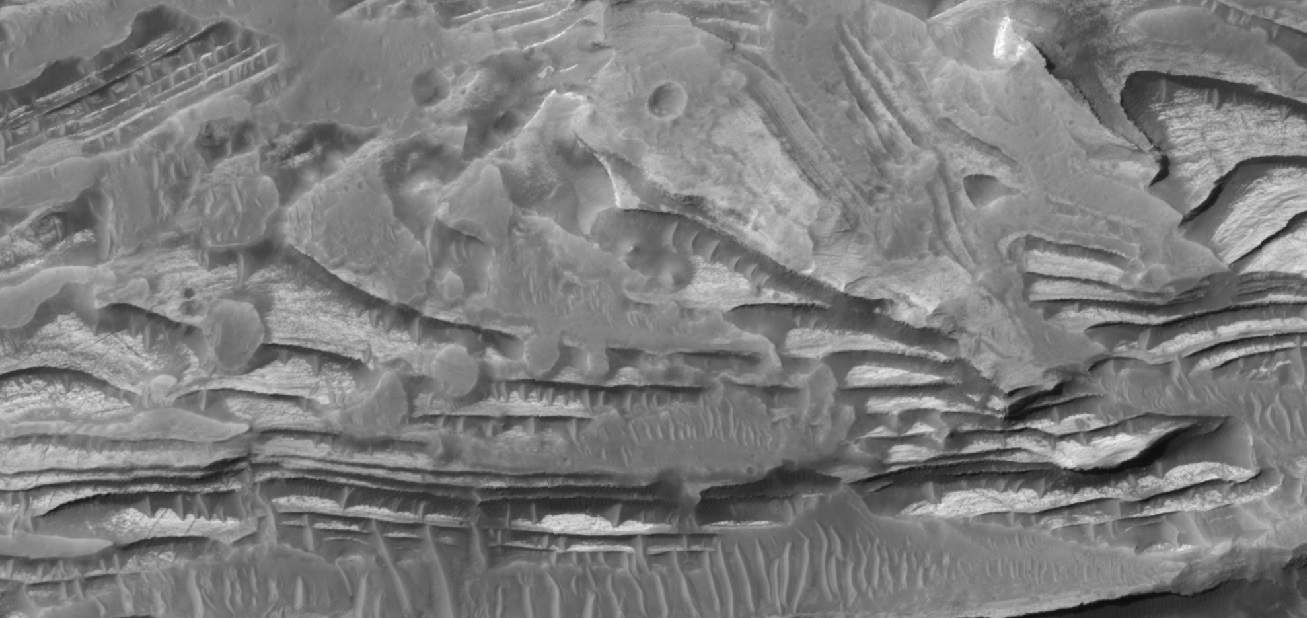
Close view of layers

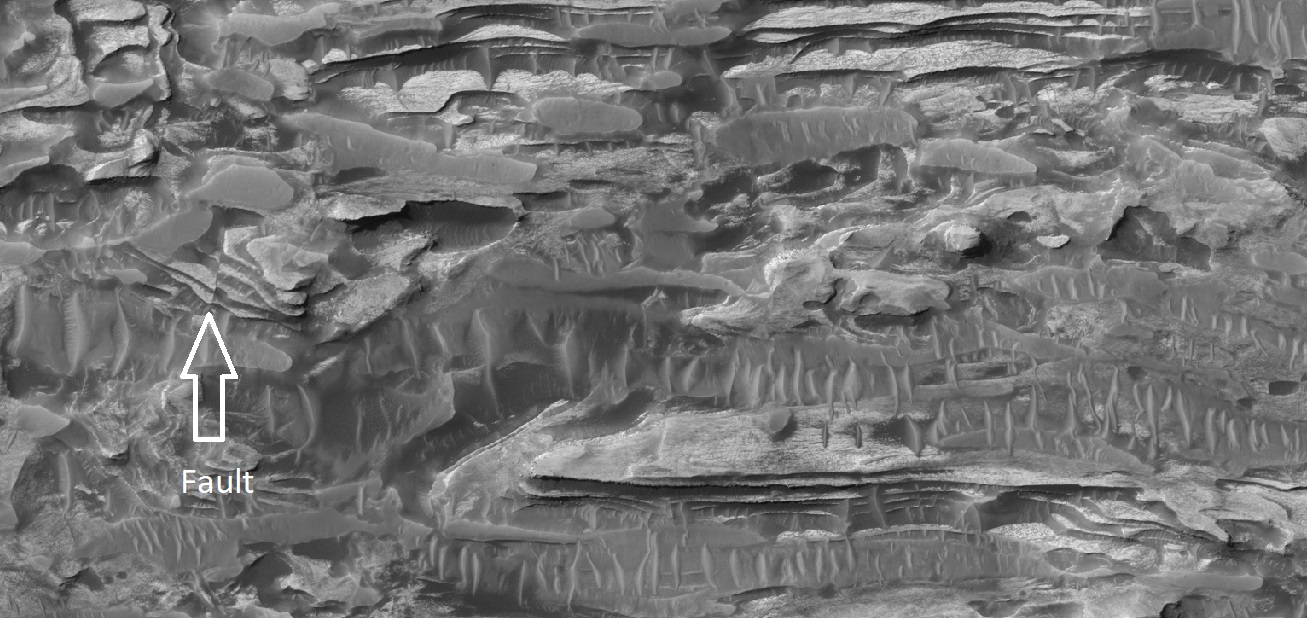
Close view of layers. Arrow points to a fault.

== See also ==
- List of craters on Mars
