= 1622 Chacornac =

Inner belt asteroid

Discovery
- Discovered by: A. Schmitt
- Discovery site: Uccle Obs.
- Discovery date: 15 March 1952

Designations
- Named after: Jean Chacornac (astronomer)
- Alternative designations: 1952 EA · 1932 DD; 1933 UX · 1939 KE; 1942 EB_{1} · 1949 KF; 1952 DP_{2} · 1953 TM_{1}
- Minor planet category: main-belt · Flora

Orbital characteristics
- Epoch 4 September 2017 (JD 2458000.5)
- Uncertainty parameter 0
- Observation arc: 85.94 yr (31,388 days)
- Aphelion: 2.5989 AU
- Perihelion: 1.8705 AU
- Semi-major axis: 2.2347 AU
- Eccentricity: 0.1630
- Orbital period (sidereal): 3.34 yr (1,220 days)
- Mean anomaly: 146.41°
- Mean motion: 0° 17^{m} 42^{s} / day
- Inclination: 6.4607°
- Longitude of ascending node: 4.3644°
- Argument of perihelion: 256.53°

Physical characteristics
- Dimensions: 8.43±0.32 km 9.85 km (calculated); 10.27±0.65 km
- Synodic rotation period: 11.485±0.006 h 12.2044±0.0041 h 12.206±0.002 h 12.2190±0.0116 h
- Geometric albedo: 0.224±0.030; 0.24 (assumed); 0.360±0.042
- Spectral type: S
- Absolute magnitude (H): 11.954±0.001 (R) · 12.040±0.001 (R) · 12.04±1.25 · 12.10 · 12.2

1622 Chacornac (provisional designation 1952 EA) is a stony Flora asteroid from the inner regions of the asteroid belt, approximately 9 kilometers in diameter. It was discovered on 15 March 1952, by French astronomer Alfred Schmitt at the Royal Observatory of Belgium in Uccle, and named after astronomer Jean Chacornac.

== Orbit and classification ==
The S-type asteroid is a member of the Flora family, one of the largest groups of stony asteroids. It orbits the Sun in the inner main-belt at a distance of 1.9–2.6 AU once every 3 years and 4 months (1,220 days). Its orbit has an eccentricity of 0.16 and an inclination of 6° with respect to the ecliptic. The first precovery was taken at Lowell Observatory in 1930, extending Chacornac's observation arc by 22 years prior to its official discovery observation.

== Lightcurves ==
Between 2009 and 2013, several rotational lightcurves for this asteroid were obtained from photometric observations at the Palomar Transient Factory and the Hunters Hill Observatory, as well as by astronomers Eric Barbotin and Raoul Behrend. Lightcurve analysis gave a rotation period between 11.48 and 12.20 hours with a brightness variation between 0.21 and 0.25 in magnitude (U=2/2/2).

== Diameter and albedo ==
According to the survey carried out by the Japanese Akari satellite, Chacornac measures 10.3 kilometers in diameter and its surface has an albedo of 0.224, while observations by NASA's Wide-field Infrared Survey Explorer with its subsequent NEOWISE mission gave a diameter of 8.4 kilometers and a high albedo of 0.36. The Collaborative Asteroid Lightcurve Link agrees with the results obtained by AKARI and assumes an albedo of 0.24 – derived from 8 Flora, the family's largest member and namesake – and calculates a diameter of 9.9 kilometers with an absolute magnitude of 12.2.

== Naming ==
This minor planet was named in memory of French astronomer Jean Chacornac (1823–1873), an early discoverer of minor planets himself, most notably 25 Phocaea. He also discovered the parabolic comet C/1852 K1 (Chacornac) in 1852 and independently discovered 20 Massalia. The lunar crater Chacornac also bears his name. The official naming citation was published by the Minor Planet Center on 1 August 1978 (M.P.C. 4418).
