= 1713 Bancilhon =

Main-belt asteroid

Discovery
- Discovered by: L. Boyer
- Discovery site: Algiers Obs.
- Discovery date: 27 September 1951

Designations
- Named after: Odette Bancilhon (French astronomer)
- Alternative designations: 1951 SC · 1931 RW; 1958 VR
- Minor planet category: main-belt · (inner)

Orbital characteristics
- Epoch 4 September 2017 (JD 2458000.5)
- Uncertainty parameter 0
- Observation arc: 85.66 yr (31,286 days)
- Aphelion: 2.6383 AU
- Perihelion: 1.8181 AU
- Semi-major axis: 2.2282 AU
- Eccentricity: 0.1840
- Orbital period (sidereal): 3.33 yr (1,215 days)
- Mean anomaly: 316.73°
- Mean motion: 0° 17^{m} 46.68^{s} / day
- Inclination: 3.7467°
- Longitude of ascending node: 61.135°
- Argument of perihelion: 256.38°

Physical characteristics
- Dimensions: 5.716±0.113 km
- Geometric albedo: 0.259±0.049
- Absolute magnitude (H): 13.3

1713 Bancilhon, provisional designation 1951 SC, is an asteroid from the inner regions of the asteroid belt, approximately 5.7 kilometers in diameter.

It was discovered on 27 September 1951, by French astronomer Louis Boyer at Algiers Observatory in Algeria, North Africa, and named after French astronomer Odette Bancilhon.

== Orbit and classification ==
Bancilhon orbits the Sun in the inner main-belt at a distance of 1.8–2.6 AU once every 3 years and 4 months (1,215 days). Its orbit has an eccentricity of 0.18 and an inclination of 4° with respect to the ecliptic. It was first identified as 1931 RW at Lowell Observatory in 1931, extending the body's observation arc by 20 years prior to its official discovery observation.

== Physical characteristics ==
According to the survey carried out by NASA's Wide-field Infrared Survey Explorer with its subsequent NEOWISE mission, Bancilhon measures 5.716 kilometers in diameter and its surface has an albedo of 0.259, which is rather typical for asteroids with stony composition. It has an absolute magnitude of 13.3. As of 2017, Bancilhon's spectral type, rotation period and shape remain unknown.

== Naming ==
This minor planet was named for French astronomer Odette Bancilhon, Boyer's colleague and wife of astronomer Alfred Schmitt. Odette Bancilhon herself discovered the minor planet 1333 Cevenola at Algiers Observatory in 1934. The official naming citation was published by the Minor Planet Center on 1 August 1978 (M.P.C. 4419).
