= 1192 Prisma =

Elongated main-belt asteroid

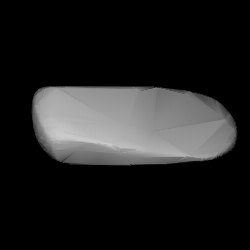
- Modelled shape of Prisma from its lightcurve

Discovery
- Discovered by: A. Schwassmann
- Discovery site: Bergedorf Obs.
- Discovery date: 17 March 1931

Designations
- Named after: Bergedorf Spectral Catalogue (astronomical catalog)
- Alternative designations: 1931 FE
- Minor planet category: main-belt · (inner); Phocaea

Orbital characteristics
- Epoch 4 September 2017 (JD 2458000.5)
- Uncertainty parameter 0
- Observation arc: 85.77 yr (31,328 days)
- Aphelion: 2.9762 AU
- Perihelion: 1.7561 AU
- Semi-major axis: 2.3661 AU
- Eccentricity: 0.2578
- Orbital period (sidereal): 3.64 yr (1,329 days)
- Mean anomaly: 297.62°
- Mean motion: 0° 16^{m} 14.88^{s} / day
- Inclination: 23.902°
- Longitude of ascending node: 1.3517°
- Argument of perihelion: 131.44°

Physical characteristics
- Dimensions: 7.22 km (calculated); 7.377±0.193 km 9.27±0.25 km
- Synodic rotation period: 6.546±0.0170 h 6.558 h 6.55836±0.00005 h
- Geometric albedo: 0.144±0.009; 0.220±0.022; 0.23 (assumed)
- Spectral type: S
- Absolute magnitude (H): 12.497±0.008 (R) · 12.87±0.47 · 12.92

1192 Prisma, provisional designation 1931 FE, is an elongated Phocaea asteroid from the inner regions of the asteroid belt, approximately 7 kilometers in diameter. It was discovered by German astronomer Friedrich Schwassmann at the Bergedorf Observatory in Hamburg on 17 March 1931. The asteroid was named after the Bergedorf Spectral Catalogue, an astronomical catalog.

== Classification and orbit ==
Prisma is a member of the Phocaea family (701), a prominent family of S-type asteroids with their largest members being 25 Phocaea and 587 Hypsipyle. There are many Mars-crossers among this family of relatively eccentric inner main-belt asteroids .

The asteroid orbits the Sun at a distance of 1.8–3.0 AU once every 3 years and 8 months (1,329 days). Its orbit has an eccentricity of 0.26 and an inclination of 24° with respect to the ecliptic. The body's observation arc begins at Bergedorf, one week after its official discovery observation.

== Physical characteristics ==
=== Rotation, shape and pole ===
Photometric observations of Prisma gave a well defined rotational lightcurve with a period between 6.546 and 6.558 hours and a high brightness variation of 0.85–1.16 magnitude, which strongly indicates that the body has an elongated, non-spheroidal shape (U=3/3).

A modeled lightcurve based on optical data from a large collaboration network also found a spin axis of (133.0°, −78.0°) in ecliptic coordinates (λ, β) (Q=n.a.).

=== Diameter and albedo ===
According to the surveys carried out by the Japanese Akari satellite, and NASA's Wide-field Infrared Survey Explorer with its subsequent NEOWISE mission, Prisma measures between 7.38 and 9.27 kilometers in diameter and its surface has an albedo between 0.144 and 0.220. The Collaborative Asteroid Lightcurve Link assumes a standard albedo of 0.23 and calculates a diameter of 7.22 kilometers based on an absolute magnitude of 12.92.

== Naming ==
This minor planet was named "Prisma" (prism) in honour of the Bergedorf Spectral Catalogue (German: Bergedorfer Spektralkatalog), as prisms are one method of obtaining spectra. The official naming citation was also published in Paul Herget's The Names of the Minor Planets in 1955 (H 111).
