= Benjamin Valz =

French astronomer

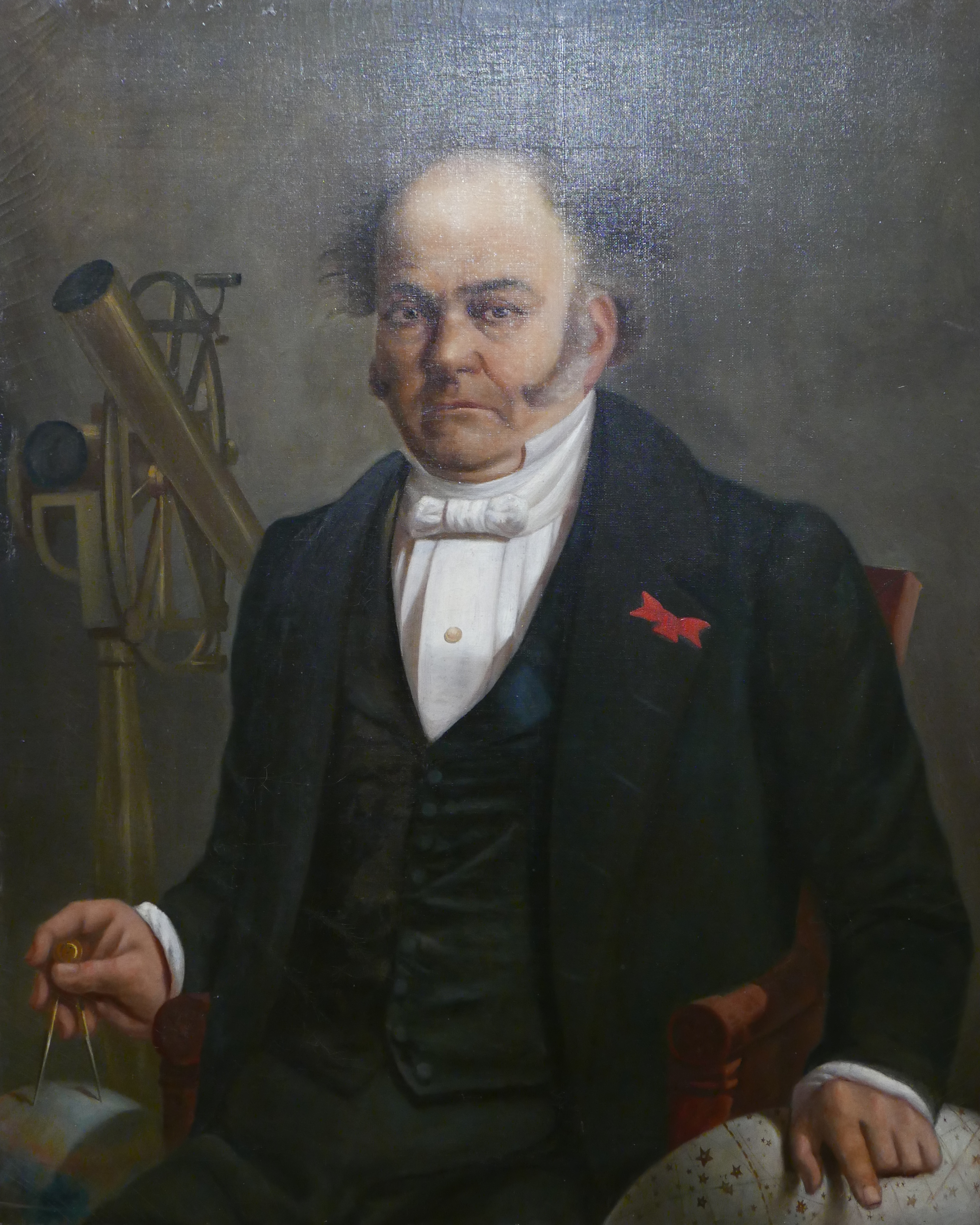
Benjamin Valz

Jean Elias Benjamin Valz (May 27, 1787 – April 22, 1867) was a French astronomer.

He was born in Nîmes and trained as an engineer. He was the son of politician Jean Valz and the grandson of the doctor, meteorologist and naturalist Pierre Baux (1708–1790). He became interested in astronomy and comets in particular, observing the return of what would later be named Comet Encke. He later made a very complete calculation of the orbital elements of another comet, for which he won recognition.

In 1835 he hypothesized that irregularities in Comet Halley's orbit could be explained by an unknown planet beyond Uranus — at the time, Neptune was not yet discovered.

He built a private observatory at his home and when he left in 1836 to take up a post as director of the Marseille Observatory, he left the use of his home to Joseph Jean Pierre Laurent, who used the observatory to discover the asteroid 51 Nemausa. The house, at 32 rue Nationale in Nîmes, has a plaque commemorating the discovery.

Valz himself was at one time said to be the discoverer of two asteroids, 20 Massalia and 25 Phocaea, but nowadays these are credited to the Italian astronomer Annibale de Gasparis and to Valz's colleague Jean Chacornac, respectively.

In 1874, Valz's widow donated 10,000 francs to the French Academy of Sciences to establish a prize in honor of her late husband. The Valz Prize (Prix Valz) was awarded for work of similar stature as that honored by the pre-existing Lalande Prize. The Valz Prize was given out from 1877 through 1970.
