= Joseph Jean Pierre Laurent =

French astronomer and chemist

Asteroids discovered: 1
51 Nemausa	22 January 1858

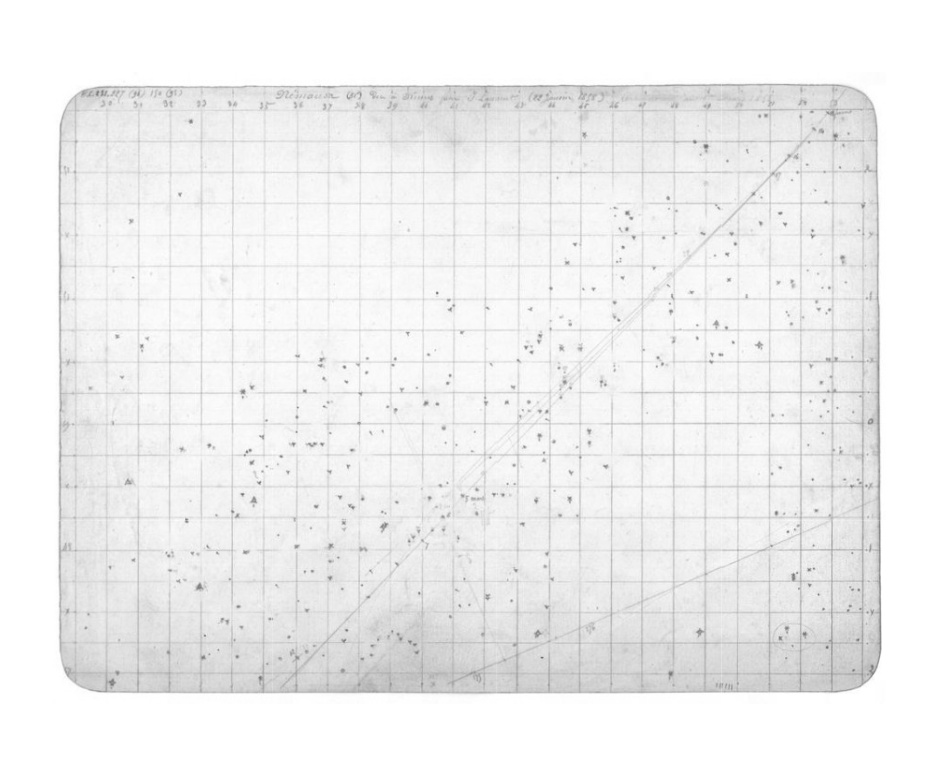
Hand-drawn star chart noting the discovery of 51 Nemausa, whose track of motion is depicted ()

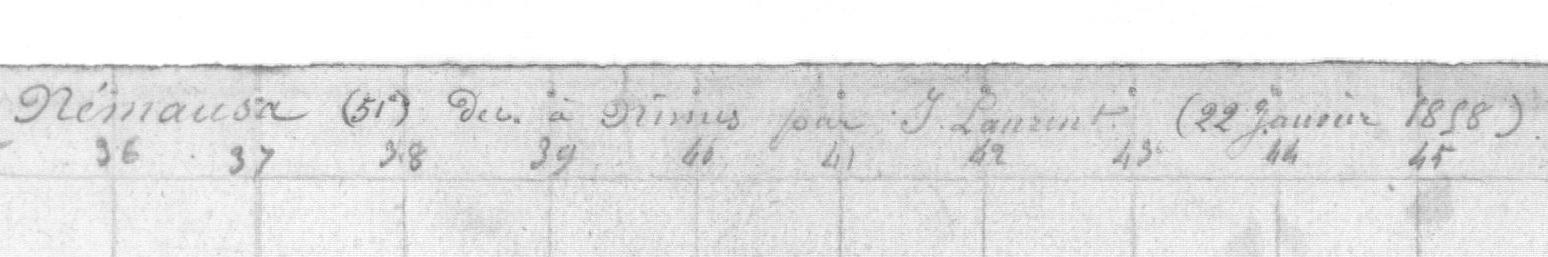
Hand-drawn star chart (detail) noting the discovery of 51 Nemausa, zoomed to show handwritten legend at top, which credits J. Laurent ()

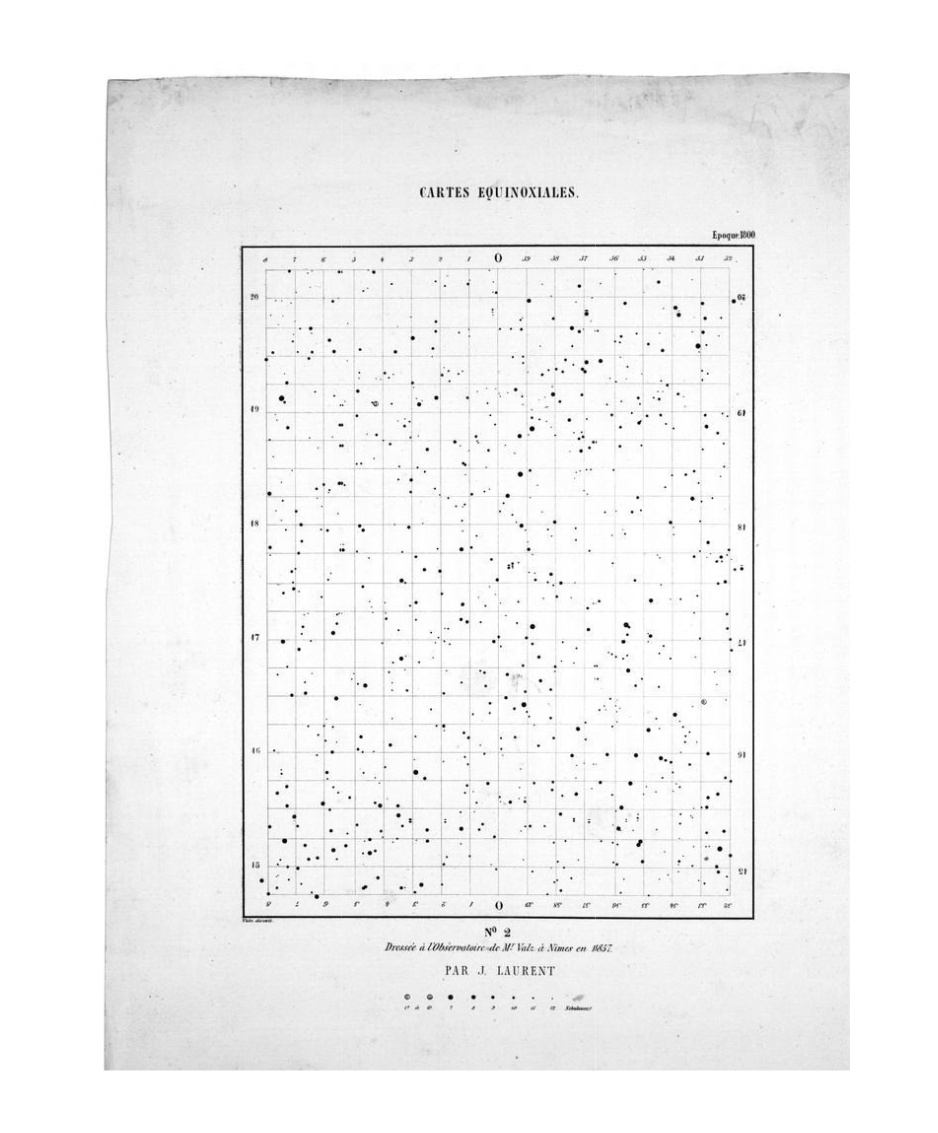
Equinoxial charts drawn up by Laurent ()

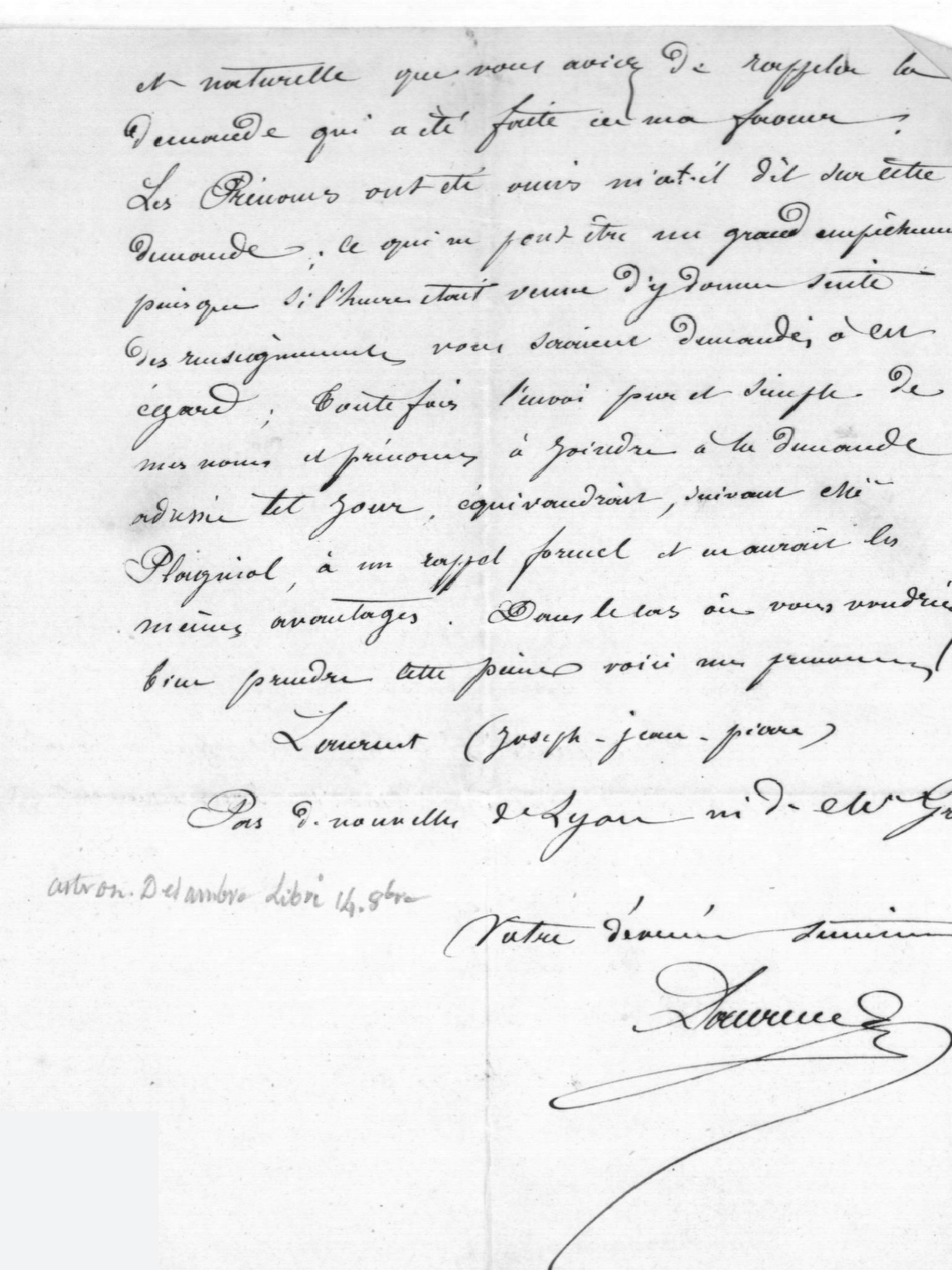
Extract of letter dated 5 September 1858 which gives his first name as Joseph-Jean-Pierre ()

Joseph Jean Pierre Laurent (or Joseph Laurent) (died 1900) was a French amateur astronomer and chemist who discovered the asteroid 51 Nemausa in 1858, for which he was a recipient of the Lalande Prize awarded by the French Academy of Sciences. It is also likely that he is the same person as the person of that name who provided chemistry assistance to photography pioneer André-Adolphe-Eugène Disdéri in 1853.

He never made any more asteroid discoveries and not much is known about him. He was described as a "very skillful young man" (un jeune homme très habile) by Édouard Stephan. He was described as a "distinguished pupil of the Marseille school", and as an amateur astronomer and an inspector of the assay office in Nîmes (contrôleur du bureau de garantie de Nîmes).

The asteroid was discovered using the private observatory at the house formerly occupied by Benjamin Valz, who left in 1836 to become the new director of the Marseille Observatory. He entrusted his former observatory to Laurent, who later found the asteroid. The house, at 32 rue Nationale in Nîmes (at that time known as rue de l'Agau), has a plaque commemorating the discovery.

Laurent was awarded the Lalande Prize of the French Academy of Sciences in 1858 for his discovery, jointly with five other asteroid and comet discoverers. In addition, asteroid 162 Laurentia was named in his honour.

Laurent was named assistant astronomer at the Marseille Observatory on 26 November 1858, however he resigned on 20 February 1859. He cited the disorder in the management of the observatory by Valz as the reason. Valz for his part blamed Laurent for neglecting his duties and disloyalty, in a 14 May 1863 letter to d'Abbadie.

Upon his resignation in February 1859, Laurent started a chemical analysis and testing laboratory in Marseille under the name J. Icard et J. Laurent.

== First name ==
Nineteenth-century sources do not mention his first name, referring to him only as "M. Laurent", the standard French abbreviation for Monsieur Laurent. At one time the Minor Planet Center, which lists asteroid discoverers using their initials and surname, gave his name as "A. Laurent", with the "A." (for "Anonymous") as a sort of placeholder for an unknown first name. However, in a letter dated 5 September 1858 to Benjamin Valz, Laurent wrote that his first name is Joseph-Jean-Pierre (see image), and the Minor Planet Center now uses "J. J. P. Laurent".

When using only an initial rather than his full first name, he sometimes used "J. Laurent". A small set of astronomical charts known to have been drawn up by Laurent himself, as well as a hand-drawn star chart portraying the discovery of 51 Nemausa, show his name as J. Laurent (see images). Philippe Véron in his unpublished Dictionnaire des astronomes français gives his name as "Joseph Laurent"

In 1857, it was reported that Valz had undertaken the publication of equinoxial charts, to be drawn up by Laurent. When Valz reported the discovery of Nemausa in a letter to the Comptes rendus hebdomadaires des séances de l'Académie des Sciences, he cited this as the "first success" of these equinoxial charts. The equinoxial charts in question indicate the author as "J. Laurent" (see image) and this is also indicated in a library catalog. A notation (see image) at the top of a hand-drawn star chart in the Observatoire de Marseille – Patrimoines archives notes the discovery of the asteroid as follows: Némausa (51) dec. [ = découverte ] à Nîmes par J. Laurent (22 janvier 1858), which means "51 Nemausa disc. [ = discovered ] at Nîmes by J. Laurent (22 January 1858)".

== Possible connection to photography pioneer Disdéri ==
André-Adolphe-Eugène Disdéri pioneered the carte de visite, an early form of mass-production portraiture photography. According to his biographer Elizabeth Anne McCauley, Disdéri developed this process during his stay in Nîmes in 1853, and then moved back to Paris to make his fortune. She cites Disdéri's own book which thanks a chemist and assay office inspector in Nîmes named Monsieur Laurent for his assistance with the chemistry. In her book McCauley identifies the full name of this Monsieur Laurent as Joseph Jean Pierre Laurent, citing an 1855 passport application.

The coincidence of name, profession, city and time period is suggestive, however a definitive link to the discoverer of the asteroid has not been established.
