= Massalia (disambiguation) =

Massalia was an ancient Greek colony on the Mediterranean coast, east of the Rhône.

Massalia may also refer to:

- Massalia family, a family of asteroids
  - 20 Massalia, an asteroid
- Massalia, ancient name of Marseille
- MS Massalia, the original name of a car and passenger ferry renamed MS Scandinavian Star
