= Valz =

Valz may refer to:

== People ==
- Benjamin Valz (1787–1867), French astronomer
- Ian Valz (1957-2010), Guyanese playwright
- Jean Valz (1746–1794), French politician

== Places ==
- Valz-sous-Châteauneuf, France

== Other ==
- Valz Prize, awarded by the French Academy of Sciences
