= 1617 Alschmitt =

Main-belt asteroid

Discovery
- Discovered by: L. Boyer
- Discovery site: Algiers Obs.
- Discovery date: 20 March 1952

Designations
- Named after: Alfred Schmitt (astronomer)
- Alternative designations: 1952 FB · 1929 CC_{1} 1935 ER · 1941 HH; 1947 LS · 1952 DK_{2} 1975 AJ · A906 DC
- Minor planet category: main-belt · (outer)

Orbital characteristics
- Epoch 4 September 2017 (JD 2458000.5)
- Uncertainty parameter 0
- Observation arc: 111.18 yr (40,607 days)
- Aphelion: 3.6085 AU
- Perihelion: 2.7913 AU
- Semi-major axis: 3.1999 AU
- Eccentricity: 0.1277
- Orbital period (sidereal): 5.72 yr (2,091 days)
- Mean anomaly: 167.85°
- Mean motion: 0° 10^{m} 19.92^{s} / day
- Inclination: 13.265°
- Longitude of ascending node: 154.96°
- Argument of perihelion: 24.216°

Physical characteristics
- Dimensions: 21.12±2.86 km 21.283±0.267 km 36.78 km (calculated)
- Synodic rotation period: 7.0602±0.0033 h 7.0613±0.0007 h 7.062±0.002 h
- Geometric albedo: 0.057 (assumed); 0.190±0.046; 0.270±0.020
- Spectral type: C
- Absolute magnitude (H): 10.4 · 10.80 · 10.807±0.002 (R) · 10.9

1617 Alschmitt, provisional designation 1952 FB, is an assumed carbonaceous asteroid from in the outer parts of the main belt, approximately 30 kilometers in diameter. It was discovered on 20 March 1952, by French astronomer Louis Boyer at Algiers Observatory in Algeria, Northern Africa, and named after French astronomer Alfred Schmitt.

== Orbit and classification ==
This asteroid orbits the Sun in the outer main-belt at a distance of 2.8–3.6 AU once every 5 years and 9 months (2,091 days). Its orbit has an eccentricity of 0.13 and an inclination of 13° with respect to the ecliptic. Alschmitt was first identified as A906 DC at Heidelberg in 1906, extending the body's observation arc by 46 years prior to its official discovery observation.

== Physical characteristics ==
Alschmitt is a presumed carbonaceous C-type asteroid.

=== Lightcurves ===
Two rotational lightcurve of Alschmitt obtained in 2003 and 2004, by René Roy and Laurent Bernasconi, gave a well-defined rotation period of 7.0613 and 7.062 hours with a brightness variation of 0.39 and 0.52 in magnitude, respectively (U=3/3). In October 2010, the Palomar Transient Factory derived a period of 7.0602 hours with an amplitude 0.49 magnitude (U=2).

=== Diameter and albedo ===
According to the survey carried out by NASA's Wide-field Infrared Survey Explorer with its subsequent NEOWISE mission, Alschmitt measures 21.12 and 21.28 kilometers in diameter, and its surface has an albedo of 0.190 and 0.270, respectively. The Collaborative Asteroid Lightcurve Link assumes a standard albedo for carbonaceous asteroids of 0.057 and calculates a diameter of 36.78 kilometers using an absolute magnitude of 10.9.

== Naming ==
Boyer named this minor planet for his colleague Alfred Schmitt (1907–1973), astronomer at Algiers, Strasbourg and Quito observatories, who, 20 years earlier, had named the asteroid 1215 Boyer in his honor. The official naming citation was published by the Minor Planet Center on 1 August 1978 (M.P.C. 4418).
