= Comet Pons =

Comet Pons may refer to any one of these comets:

- C/1801 N1
- C/1802 Q1
- C/1804 E1
- C/1806 V1 (a.k.a. 1806 II)
- C/1808 F1 (a.k.a. 1808 I)
- C/1808 M1 (a.k.a. 1808 II)
- C/1810 Q1
- C/1811 W1 (a.k.a. 1811 II)
- C/1813 C1 (a.k.a. 1813 I)
- C/1813 G1 (a.k.a. 1813 II)
- C/1816 B1
- C/1817 Y1 (a.k.a. 1818 II)
- C/1818 W2 (a.k.a. 1818 III)
- C/1822 K1 (a.k.a. 1822 III)
- C/1822 N1 (a.k.a. 1822 IV)
- C/1825 N1 (a.k.a. 1825 IV)
- C/1825 P1 (a.k.a. 1825 II)
- C/1825 V1 (a.k.a. 1826 II)
- C/1826 P1 (a.k.a. 1826 IV)
- C/1826 U1 (a.k.a. 1826 V)
- C/1826 Y1 (a.k.a. 1827 I)
- C/1827 P1 (a.k.a. 1827 III)

Comet Pons may also be a partial reference to:

- Comet Nicollet-Pons, C/1821 B1
- 12P/Pons-Brooks (a.k.a. 12P/1812 O1, 12P/1883 R1, 1884 I, 1883b, 12P/1953 M1, 1954 VII, 1953c)
- 273P/Pons-Gambart (a.k.a. 273P/1827 M1, 1827 II, 273P/2012 V4)
- 7P/Pons-Winnecke (a.k.a. 7P/1819 L1, 1819 III, 7P/1858 E1, 1858 II, 7P/1869 G1, 1869 I, 1869a, 1875 I, 1875b, 1886 VI, 1886d, 1892 IV, 1892c, 1898 II, 1898a, 1909 II, 1909d, 1915 III, 1915b, 1921 III, 1921b, 1927 VII, 1927c, 1933 II, 1933b, 1939 V, 1939c, 1945 IV, 1945a, 1951 VI, 1951c, 1964 I, 1964b, 1970 VIII, 1970b, 1976 XIV, 1976f, 1983 IV, 1983b, 1989 VIII, 1989g)

Note

The comets are named after the prolific early 19th-century astronomer Jean-Louis Pons, who worked at Marseilles Observatory, Lucca, and Florence observatories. Some comets were discovered by Pons gained other names, for example Encke's Comet was called by Encke, Pon's Comet.
