= 587 Hypsipyle =

Main-belt asteroid

Discovery
- Discovered by: M. F. Wolf
- Discovery site: Heidelberg Obs.
- Discovery date: 22 February 1906

Designations
- Pronunciation: /hɪpˈsɪpɪliː/
- Named after: Hypsipyle (Greek mythology)
- Alternative designations: 1906 TF · 1931 CH; 1956 EN_{1}
- Minor planet category: main-belt · (inner); Phocaea

Orbital characteristics
- Epoch 4 September 2017 (JD 2458000.5)
- Uncertainty parameter 0
- Observation arc: 111.10 yr (40,578 days)
- Aphelion: 2.7254 AU
- Perihelion: 1.9442 AU
- Semi-major axis: 2.3348 AU
- Eccentricity: 0.1673
- Orbital period (sidereal): 3.57 yr (1,303 days)
- Mean anomaly: 85.891°
- Mean motion: 0° 16^{m} 34.68^{s} / day
- Inclination: 24.993°
- Longitude of ascending node: 324.58°
- Argument of perihelion: 188.53°

Physical characteristics
- Dimensions: 11.022±0.086 km 11.51±0.50 km 12.944±0.103 km 12.991 km 12.99 km (taken); 13.54±0.28 km
- Synodic rotation period: 2.8881±0.0006 h 2.8899±0.0006 h 13.6816±0.0005 h
- Geometric albedo: 0.081±0.004; 0.1392; 0.1413±0.0237; 0.208±0.034; 0.474±0.340
- Spectral type: S
- Absolute magnitude (H): 11.12 · 11.73±0.39 · 11.9 · 12.70 · 12.19 · 12.19±0.11

587 Hypsipyle, provisional designation 1906 TF, is a stony Phocaea asteroid from the inner regions of the asteroid belt, approximately 12 kilometers in diameter. It was discovered on 22 February 1906, by Germany astronomer Max Wolf at Heidelberg Observatory in southwest Germany.

The asteroid was named after the Queen Hypsipyle from Greek mythology and is one of the principal members of the Phocaea family.
