= Elizabeth Anne McCauley =

American art historian

Academic background
- Education: Wellesley College, Yale University

Academic work
- Discipline: Art History
- Sub-discipline: History of Photography
- Institutions: Princeton University

Elizabeth Anne McCauley is an art historian. She serves as David Hunter McAlpin Professor of the History of Photography and Modern Art at Princeton University.

McCauley graduated from Yale University. Her work deals with 19th- and early-20th-century visual culture, particularly the history of photography.

== Works ==
- A. A. E. Disdéri and the Carte de Visite Portrait Photograph (Yale University Press, 1985) OCLC 228668690
- Industrial Madness: Commercial Photography in Paris, 1848-1871 (Yale University Press, 1994) ISBN 9780300038545, OCLC 28585299
- The Museum and the Photograph with Mark Haworth-Booth (Sterling and Francine Clark Art Institute, 1998) ISBN 9780931102400, OCLC 37935241
- Gondola Days: Isabella Stewart Gardner and the Palazzo Barbaro Circle with Alan Chong, Rosella Mamella Zorzi, and Richard Lingner (Isabella Stewart Gardner Museum, 2004) ISBN 9780914660217, OCLC 938200301
- The Steerage and Alfred Stieglitz with Jason Francisco (University of California Press, 2012) OCLC 755640723
