= Odette Bancilhon =

French astronomer

- Born: 22 September 1908
- Died: 1998 (aged 89–90)
- Occupation: Astronomer
- Known for: Discovered 1333 Cevenola asteroid
- Spouse: Alfred Schmitt

Odette Bancilhon (22 September 1908 – 1998) was a French astronomer. She is best known for her work during the 1930s and 1940s at the Algiers Observatory, in Algeria, North Africa, where she discovered 1333 Cevenola, a stony Eunomian asteroid from the main-belt.

== Life and work ==
Bancilhon was a graduate in science and she served as a meteorological assistant in Algiers for one year beginning 1 December 1932. On 7 December 1933, she was appointed as Alfred Schmitt's replacement while he performed his military service. In that capacity, in 1934, she discovered the asteroid (1333) Cevenola. (All of her publications at that time were signed O. Bancilhon, a practice of her profession.) She was named an assistant on 1 November 1937.

She married her colleague Alfred Schmitt in Algiers on 12 September 1942, and became known professionally as O. Schmitt-Bancilhon.

She and her husband were transferred to the Strasbourg Observatory in France on 1 January 1950, and she worked there as an assistant for several years. The couple then moved to the Quito Observatory in Ecuador from 2 October 1956 to 10 April 1958. She was an assistant there while her husband served as observatory director. She retired on 1 July 1964.

The main-belt asteroid 1713 Bancilhon (measuring 5.716 kilometers in diameter) was named in her honor. It was discovered on 27 September 1951 by Louis Boyer, her former colleague at the Algiers Observatory.

== Selected publications ==
- Schmitt, A., and O. Schmitt-Bancilhon. "Positions of Comets obtained visually at the Equatorial Coudé of the Algiers Observatory." Observer Journal 31 (1948): 164.
