= 59 Elpis =

Main-belt asteroid

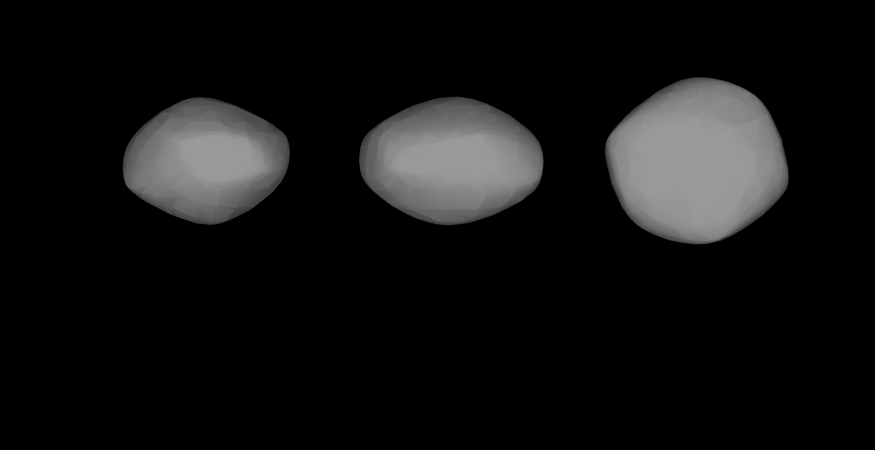
- A three-dimensional model of 59 Elpis based on its light curve

Discovery
- Discovered by: Jean Chacornac
- Discovery date: 12 September 1860

Designations
- Pronunciation: /ˈɛlpɪs/
- Named after: Elpis
- Minor planet category: Main belt
- Adjectives: Elpidian /ɛlˈpɪdiən/

Orbital characteristics
- Epoch 31 December 2006 (JD 2454100.5)
- Aphelion: 453.624 million km (3.032 AU)
- Perihelion: 358.808 million km (2.398 AU)
- Semi-major axis: 406.216 million km (2.715 AU)
- Eccentricity: 0.117
- Orbital period (sidereal): 1634.355 d (4.47 a)
- Mean anomaly: 246.848°
- Inclination: 8.631°
- Longitude of ascending node: 170.209°
- Argument of perihelion: 210.901°

Physical characteristics
- Dimensions: 163.61±6.50 km (composite estimate); 164.8±6.0 km
- Mass: (3.09±0.28)×10^{18} kg (Note: Calculated from its standard gravitational parameter GM = 0.206±0.019 km^{3}/s^{2}.)
- Mean density: 1.31 g/cm^{3} (Note: Assuming a diameter of 165 km.)
- Synodic rotation period: 13.69 h
- Geometric albedo: 0.044
- Spectral type: CP/B
- Absolute magnitude (H): 7.93

59 Elpis is a large main belt asteroid that orbits the Sun with a period of 4.47 years. It is a C-type asteroid, meaning that it is very dark and carbonaceous in composition. In the Tholen scheme it has a classification of CP, while Bus and Binzen class it as type B.

Elpis was discovered by Jean Chacornac from Paris, on 12 September 1860. It was Chacornac's sixth and final asteroid discovery.

A controversy arose over the naming of Elpis. Urbain Le Verrier, director of the Paris Observatory, at first refused to allow Chacornac to name the object, because Leverrier was promoting a plan to reorganize asteroid nomenclature by naming them after their discoverers, rather than mythological figures. A protest arose among astronomers. At the Vienna Observatory, Edmund Weiss, who had been studying the asteroid, asked the observatory's director, Karl L. Littrow, to name it. Littrow chose Elpis, a Greek personification of hope, in reference to the favorable political conditions in Europe at the time. In 1862, Leverrier permitted Chacornac to choose a name, and he selected "Olympia" at the suggestion of John Russell Hind. However, Elpis is the name that stuck.

Elpis has been studied by radar.
