= C/1852 K1 (Chacornac) =

Parabolic comet

Discovery
- Discovered by: Jean Chacornac
- Discovery site: Marseille, France
- Discovery date: 16 May 1852

Designations
- Alternative designations: 1852 II

Orbital characteristics
- Epoch: 20 April 1852 (JD 2397598.5873)
- Observation arc: 28 days
- Earliest precovery date: 7 May 1852
- Number of observations: 31
- Perihelion: 0.905 AU
- Eccentricity: ~1.000
- Inclination: 131.12°
- Longitude of ascending node: 319.27°
- Argument of periapsis: 37.206°
- Last perihelion: 20 April 1852
- Earth MOID: 0.012 AU

Physical characteristics
- Apparent magnitude: 9.8 (1852 apparition)

Chacornac's Comet, formally designated as C/1852 K1, is a faint parabolic comet that was observed through telescopes between May and June 1852. It is the only comet discovered by French astronomer Jean Chacornac, and is the parent body of the Eta Eridanid meteor shower. (Note: Alternatively, the periodic comet 273P/Pons–Gambart is also considered as the parent body of the Eta Eridanids. However, recent evidence suggests that C/1852 K1 (Charconac) is the much more likely candidate from where this meteor shower originated.)

== Discovery and observations ==
Jean Chacornac made his only comet discovery from the Marseille Observatory on 16 May 1852, where he spotted a "faint, diffuse object" without a discernible tail nor nucleus in the constellation Cepheus. (Note: Reported initial position upon discovery was: α = 22^{h} 34^{m} , δ = 66° 00′) He later confirmed his discovery the following day.
