= 34 Circe =

Main-belt asteroid

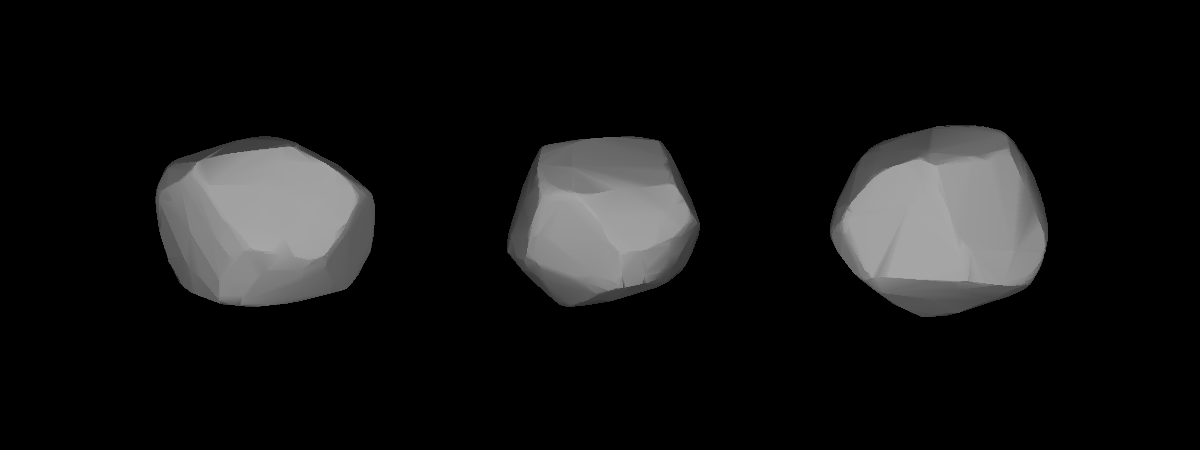
- A three-dimensional model of 34 Circe based on its light curve

Discovery
- Discovered by: J. Chacornac
- Discovery date: 6 April 1855

Designations
- Designation: (34) Circe
- Pronunciation: /ˈsɜːrsiː/
- Named after: Circe
- Alternative names: 1965 JL
- Minor planet category: Main belt
- Adjectives: Circean /sərˈsiːən/

Orbital characteristics
- Epoch 21 November 2025 (JD 2461000.5)
- Aphelion: 2.975 AU
- Perihelion: 2.401 AU
- Semi-major axis: 2.688 AU
- Eccentricity: 0.107
- Orbital period (sidereal): 4.407 yr (1609.636 d)
- Average orbital speed: 18.12 km/s
- Mean anomaly: 305.209°
- Inclination: 5.496°
- Longitude of ascending node: 184.294°
- Argument of perihelion: 329.414°
- Jupiter MOID: 2.023 AU
- T_{Jupiter}: 3.358

Physical characteristics
- Mean diameter: 117 ± 14 km/96 ± 10 km(pole solution 1); 116 ± 11 km/107 ± 10 km(pole solution 2)
- Mass: (8.5±1.6)×10^{17} kg (Note: Calculated from its standard gravitational parameter GM = 0.057±0.011 km^{3}/s^{2}.)
- Mean density: 1.02–1.84 g/cm^{3} (calculated)
- Surface gravity: 0.017–0.025 m/s^{2}
- Escape velocity: 44–49 m/s
- Synodic rotation period: 0.5063 d (12.15 h)
- Pole ecliptic longitude: 94° or 275°
- Pole ecliptic latitude: 35° or 51°
- Albedo: 0.023 ± 0.006
- Temperature: ~172 K
- Spectral type: Ch (Bus/DeMeo); C (Tholen)
- Absolute magnitude (H): 8.75

34 Circe is a large, very dark main-belt asteroid. It was discovered by French astronomer J. Chacornac on 6 April 1855, and named after Circe, the bewitching queen of Aeaea island in Greek mythology.

The spectrum of this object matches a C-type asteroid, suggesting a carbonaceous composition. It has a cross-section size of 113 km and is orbiting the Sun with a period of 4.40 years. Photometric observations of this asteroid made during 2007 at the Organ Mesa Observatory in Las Cruces, New Mexico gave an asymmetrical bimodal light curve with a period of 12.176 ± 0.002 hours and a brightness variation of 0.17 ± 0.02 in magnitude. The spectra of the asteroid displays evidence of aqueous alteration.
