= 162 Laurentia =

Main-belt asteroid

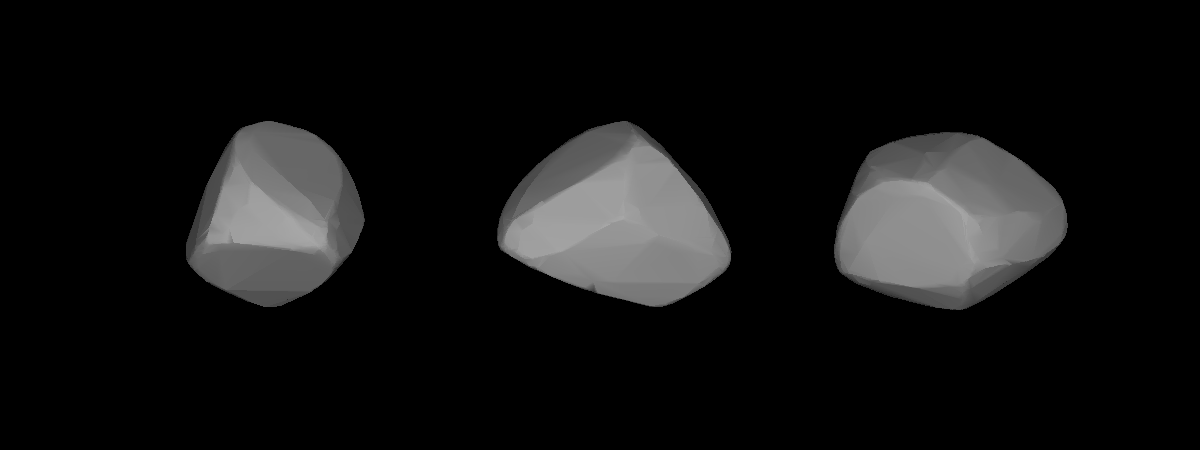
- A three-dimensional model of 162 Laurentia based on its lightcurve

Discovery
- Discovered by: Paul Henry and Prosper Henry
- Discovery site: Paris
- Discovery date: 21 April 1876

Designations
- Pronunciation: /lɒˈrɛnʃiə/
- Named after: Joseph Jean Pierre Laurent
- Alternative designations: A876 HB
- Minor planet category: main belt

Orbital characteristics
- Epoch 31 July 2016 (JD 2457600.5)
- Uncertainty parameter 0
- Observation arc: 113.88 yr (41596 d)
- Aphelion: 3.5574 AU (532.18 Gm)
- Perihelion: 2.4779 AU (370.69 Gm)
- Semi-major axis: 3.0177 AU (451.44 Gm)
- Eccentricity: 0.17887
- Orbital period (sidereal): 5.24 yr (1914.7 d)
- Mean anomaly: 300.020°
- Mean motion: 0° 11^{m} 16.872^{s} / day
- Inclination: 6.0977°
- Longitude of ascending node: 35.539°
- Argument of perihelion: 116.277°
- Earth MOID: 1.49465 AU (223.596 Gm)
- Jupiter MOID: 1.47116 AU (220.082 Gm)
- T_{Jupiter}: 3.214

Physical characteristics
- Mean diameter: 98.65±1.95 km (composite estimate); 97.021±0.493 km
- Mass: (1.452 ± 0.658/0.289)×10^{18} kg (6.7±2.7)×10^{17} kg (Note: Calculated from its standard gravitational parameter GM = 0.045±0.018 km^{3}/s^{2}.)
- Mean density: 3.037 ± 1.376/0.604 g/cm^{3} (Note: Assuming a diameter of 97 km.); 1.41 g/cm^{3}
- Synodic rotation period: 11.8686 h (0.49453 d)
- Geometric albedo: 0.051±0.006
- Spectral type: C
- Absolute magnitude (H): 9.16

162 Laurentia is a large and dark main-belt asteroid that was discovered by the French brothers Paul Henry and Prosper Henry on 21 April 1876, and named after Joseph Jean Pierre Laurent, an amateur astronomer who discovered asteroid 51 Nemausa.

An occultation by Laurentia was observed from Clive, Alberta on 21 November 1999.

Photometric observations of this asteroid from multiple observatories during 2007 gave a light curve with a period of 11.8686 ± 0.0004 hours and a brightness variation of 0.40 ± 0.05 in magnitude. This is in agreement with previous studies in 1994 and 2007.
