= 38 Leda =

Main-belt asteroid

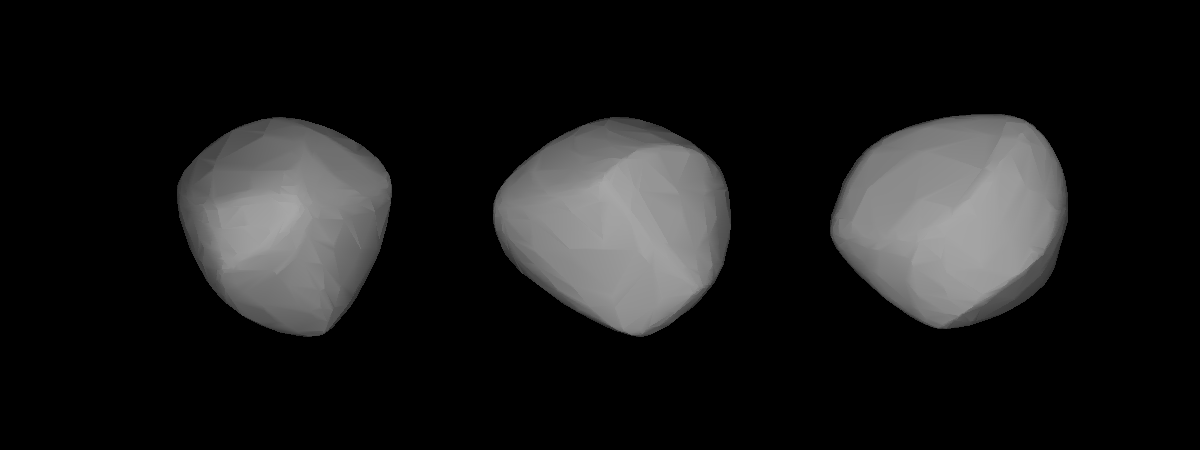
- A three-dimensional model of 38 Leda based on its lightcurve

Discovery
- Discovered by: J. Chacornac
- Discovery date: 12 January 1856

Designations
- Designation: (38) Leda
- Pronunciation: /ˈliːdə/
- Named after: Leda
- Alternative names: A904 SF; 1949 QO_{2}
- Minor planet category: Main belt
- Adjectives: Ledean /lɪˈdiːən/ (Latin Lēdæ-us)

Orbital characteristics
- Epoch 31 December 2006 (JD 2454100.5)
- Aphelion: 472.587 million km (3.159 AU)
- Perihelion: 348.232 million km (2.328 AU)
- Semi-major axis: 410.409 million km (2.743 AU)
- Eccentricity: 0.152
- Orbital period (sidereal): 1659.725 d (4.54 a)
- Average orbital speed: 17.88 km/s
- Mean anomaly: 107.567°
- Inclination: 6.955°
- Longitude of ascending node: 295.890°
- Argument of perihelion: 168.804°

Physical characteristics
- Mean diameter: 118.62±4.22 km (composite estimate); 92.255 ± 0.490 km
- Mass: (7.16 ± 3.38/2.24)×10^{17} kg (1.05±0.18)×10^{18} kg (Note: Calculated from its standard gravitational parameter GM = 0.070±0.012 km^{3}/s^{2}.)
- Mean density: 1.743 ± 0.822/0.544 g/cm^{3} (Note: Assuming a diameter of 92.3 km.); 2.55 g/cm^{3}
- Surface gravity: 0.0225 m/s²
- Escape velocity: 0.0455 km/s
- Synodic rotation period: 0.5350 d (12.84 h)
- Albedo: 0.055
- Temperature: ~170 K
- Spectral type: C
- Absolute magnitude (H): 8.32

38 Leda is a large, dark main-belt asteroid that was discovered by French astronomer J. Chacornac on 12 January 1856, and named after Leda, the mother of Helen of Troy in Greek mythology. In the Tholen classification system, it is categorized as a carbonaceous C-type asteroid, while the Bus asteroid taxonomy system lists it as a Cgh asteroid. The spectra of the asteroid displays evidence of aqueous alteration.

Leda has been studied by radar. During 2002, 38 Leda was observed by radar from the Arecibo Observatory. The return signal matched an effective diameter of 116 ± 13 km. This is consistent with some asteroid dimensions computed through other means. Based upon a light curve that was generated from photometric observations of this asteroid at Pulkovo Observatory, it has a rotation period of 12.834 ± 0.001 hours and varies in brightness by 0.15 ± 0.01 in magnitude.
