= 33 Polyhymnia =

Main-belt asteroid

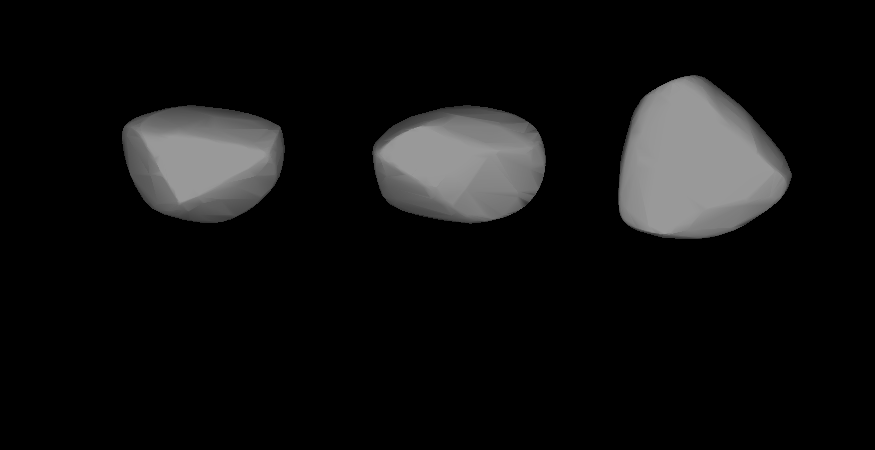
- A three-dimensional model of 33 Polyhymnia based on its lightcurve

Discovery
- Discovered by: J. Chacornac
- Discovery date: 28 October 1854

Designations
- Pronunciation: /pɒliˈhɪmniə/
- Named after: Polyhymnia
- Alternative designations: A887 HA; 1938 FE; 1953 AK; 1957 YL; 1963 DG; 1976 YT_{7}
- Minor planet category: Main belt

Orbital characteristics
- Epoch 21 November 2025 (JD 2461000.5)
- Aphelion: 3.832 AU
- Perihelion: 1.916 AU
- Semi-major axis: 2.874 AU
- Eccentricity: 0.333
- Orbital period (sidereal): 4.873 yr (1779.77 d)
- Mean anomaly: 107.070°
- Inclination: 1.852°
- Longitude of ascending node: 8.212°
- Argument of perihelion: 338.828°
- Jupiter MOID: 1.589 AU
- T_{Jupiter}: 3.211

Physical characteristics
- Dimensions: 54.39±11.84 km (infrared); 53.98±0.91 km 64±6 km (occultation)
- Synodic rotation period: 18.60888±0.00029 h
- Spectral type: S or Sq
- Absolute magnitude (H): 8.55

33 Polyhymnia is a main belt asteroid that was discovered by French astronomer Jean Chacornac on 28 October 1854 and named after Polyhymnia, the Greek Muse of sacred hymns.

== Rotation ==
Photometric observations of this asteroid at the Organ Mesa Observatory in Las Cruces, New Mexico during 2008 gave a light curve with a period of 18.609 ± 0.002 hours and a brightness variation of 0.15 ± 0.02 in magnitude. This result is in good agreement with a previous study performed during 1980. These results were re-examined with additional observations in 2011, yielding a refined estimate of 18.608 ± 0.001 hours and a brightness variation of 0.18 ± 0.02 magnitude. In 2020, an analysis of photometric data of Polyhymnia from 2008 to 2019 determined a more precise rotation period of 18.60888±0.00029 h. Two possible north pole orientations of Polyhymnia were also determined, with both solutions indicating an axial tilt of 151–155° (ecliptic latitudes –61° to –65°) with respect to the ecliptic.

== Orbit ==
On its highly eccentric (0.338) orbit around the Sun, Polyhymnia appears brightest (apparent magnitude 10) at its minimum distance from Earth of 0.91 AU. Its orbit puts it in a 22:9 mean-motion resonance with the planet Jupiter. The computed Lyapunov time for this asteroid is 10,000 years, indicating that it occupies a chaotic orbit that will change randomly over time because of gravitational perturbations of the planets. Measurements of the position for this asteroid from 1854 to 1969 were used to determine the gravitational influence of Jupiter upon Polyhymnia. This yields an inverse mass ratio of 1047.341±0.011 for Jupiter relative to the Sun.

== Mass and density ==
In 2012, a study by Benoît Carry gave a meta-estimate of a mass of (6.20±0.74)×10^{18} kg for Polyhymnia, based on a single study of its gravitational influence on other Solar System bodies. However, given Polyhymnia's diameter of 54 km (34 mi), this mass implies an extremely high density of 75.28±9.71 g/cm^{3}. Such a high density is unrealistic, so this mass and density estimate of Polyhymnia was considered unreliable by Carry. Several other asteroids with diameters similar to Polyhymnia were also measured to have extremely high densities in Carry's study, and were rejected for being unrealistic. Because of Polyhymnia's small size, its gravitational influence on other bodies is extremely difficult to detect and may lead to highly inaccurate mass and density estimates. For example, the 68 km (42 mi)-diameter asteroid 675 Ludmilla was originally measured to have a density of 73.99±15.05 g/cm^{3} in Carry's study, but improved orbit calculations in 2019 showed that it had a much lower density of 3.99±1.94 g/cm^{3}.

No other peer-reviewed study has attempted to determine a mass and density for Polyhymnia since Carry's study, though in 2023, researcher Fan Li performed a preliminary analysis of Polyhymnia's close approaches with other asteroids and determined a lower mass of (1.03±0.40)×10^{18} kg. Depending on the diameter used for Polyhymnia, this mass estimate suggests a density of 7.5±3.6 g/cm^{3} or 12.4 g/cm^{3}, for an occultation-derived diameter of 64 ± 6 km (39.8 ± 3.7 mi) and infrared-derived diameter of 54 km (34 mi), respectively.

== Composition ==
Visible light spectroscopy of Polyhymnia from 1995 and 2002 show that it is an S-type asteroid, meaning it is mainly composed of rocky silicates. In particular, Polyhymnia's spectrum exhibits an absorption band at 0.67 μm wavelengths, which indicates olivine and pyroxene on its surface, similar to Q-type asteroids. Since Polyhymnia shares both characteristics of S- and Q-type asteroids, it is further classified as an Sq-type asteroid according to the SMASS classification. Radio telescopes have studied Polyhymnia by radar in 1985.

In 2023, researchers Evan LaForge, Will Price, and Johann Rafelski speculated the possibility that Polyhymnia could be composed of high-density superheavy elements near atomic number 164, if Polyhymnia's extremely high density were correct and superheavy elements could be sufficiently stable. However, as noted above, Polyhymnia very likely does not have such a high density.
