= 51 Nemausa =

Main-belt asteroid

- VLT-SPHERE image of Nemausa

Discovery
- Discovered by: J. Laurent
- Discovery site: Nîmes
- Discovery date: 22 January 1858

Designations
- Pronunciation: /nɛˈmɔːsə/
- Named after: Nemausus
- Minor planet category: Main belt
- Adjectives: Nemausian /nɛˈmɔːsiən/

Orbital characteristics
- Epoch 31 December 2006 (JD 2454100.5)
- Aphelion: 2.523 AU (377.381 million km)
- Perihelion: 2.208 AU (330.360 million km)
- Semi-major axis: 2.365 AU (353.871 million km)
- Eccentricity: 0.066
- Orbital period (sidereal): 3.64 a (1328.853 d)
- Mean anomaly: 316.668°
- Inclination: 9.972°
- Longitude of ascending node: 176.168°
- Argument of perihelion: 2.820°

Physical characteristics
- Dimensions: 167 × 158 × 128 km (± 6 × 5 × 4 km)
- Mean diameter: 150±3 km
- Mass: (3.06±0.16)×10^{18} kg (Note: Calculated from its standard gravitational parameter GM = 0.204±0.011 km^{3}/s^{2}.)
- Mean density: 1.73±0.14 g/cm^{3}
- Synodic rotation period: 7.78484±0.000001 h
- Axial tilt: 153°
- Pole ecliptic longitude: 168° 170° ± 4°
- Pole ecliptic latitude: −60° −66° ± 4°
- Geometric albedo: 0.09 (calculated); 0.100 ± 0.025; 0.093
- Spectral type: G Cgh
- Absolute magnitude (H): 7.35; 7.72

51 Nemausa is a large main-belt asteroid that was discovered on 22 January 1858, by Joseph Jean Pierre Laurent. Laurent made the discovery from the private observatory of Benjamin Valz in Nîmes, France. The house, at 32 rue Nationale in Nîmes, has a plaque commemorating the discovery. With Laurent's permission, Valz named the asteroid after the Celtic god Nemausus, the patron god and namesake of Nîmes during Roman times.

Based upon its spectrum, this is listed as a C-type asteroid in the Tholen classification taxonomy, and as a Cgh by Bus and Binzel (2002). This indicates a composition similar to carbonaceous chondrite meteorites. Absorption features in the spectrum indicate the presence of phyllosilicates. It may have a water content of about 14%.

The first stellar occultation was observed on 17 August 1979, from the Gissar and Alma-Ata observatories produced two chords which were used to estimate a diameter of 150 km for the asteroid.

This is close to the present-day estimate of 147.9 km. Since then 51 Nemausa has been observed 20 times in stellar occultation.

Light curve inversion model DAMIT 1065 is a good match to a seven-chord occultation observed on 3 September 2016, from which an equivalent mean diameter of 146.4 km, and an equivalent Surface mean diameter of 150.3 km was obtained.

Lightcurve data suggests that it may have a small moon. Nemausa has been studied by radar.

Images related to 51 Nemausa
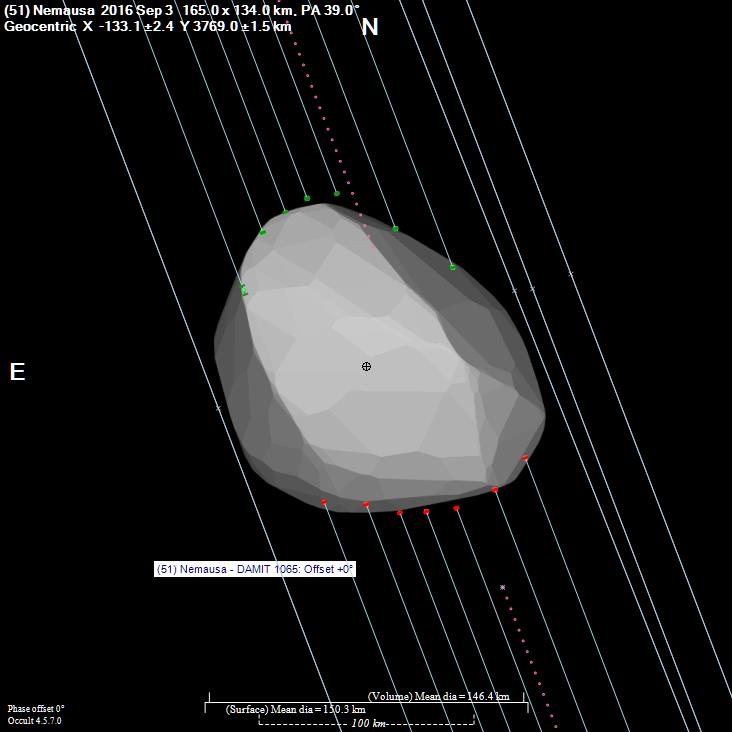
A light-curve Inversion model (DAMIT 1065) and a seven-chord occultation of 51 Nemausa

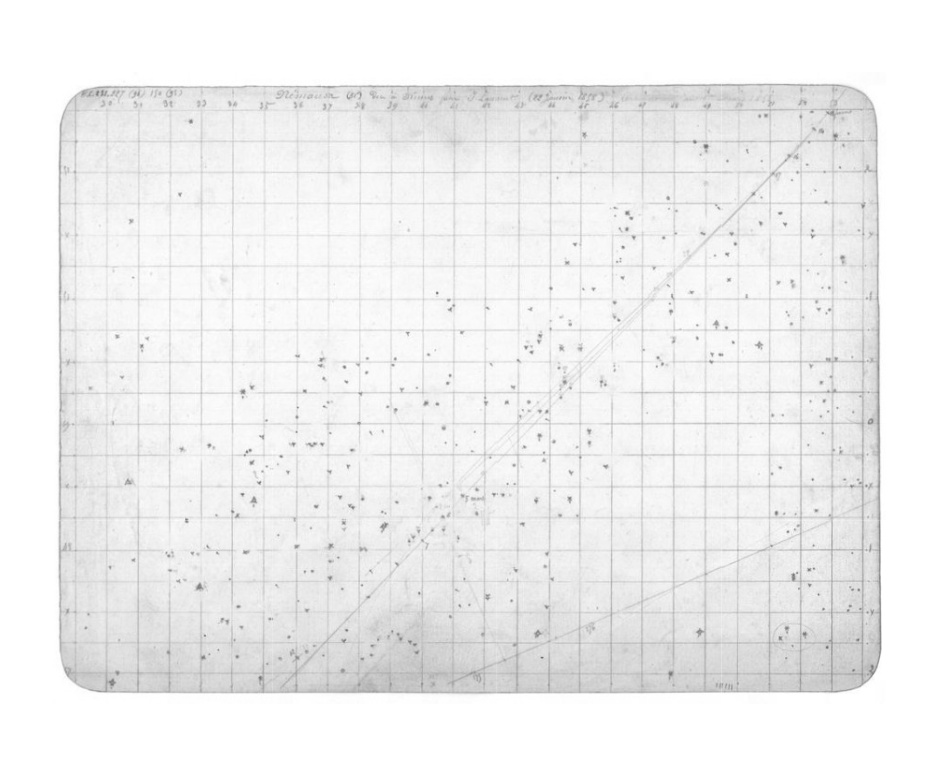
Chart dated 22 January 1858

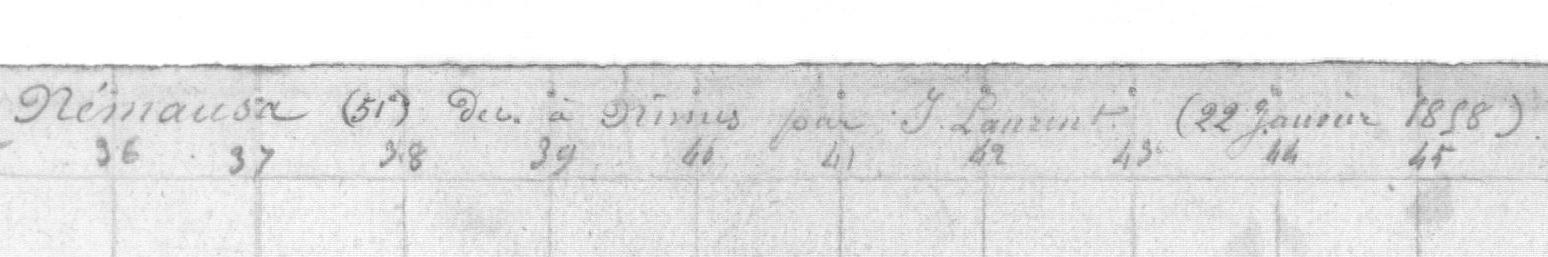
Detail of handwritten legend at top ("J. Laurent")

== See also ==
- 162 Laurentia
