= 1215 Boyer =

Stony Eunomian asteroid

Discovery
- Discovered by: A. Schmitt
- Discovery site: Algiers Obs.
- Discovery date: 19 January 1932

Designations
- Named after: Louis Boyer (French astronomer)
- Alternative designations: 1932 BA
- Minor planet category: main-belt · (middle); Eunomia · Maria

Orbital characteristics
- Epoch 4 September 2017 (JD 2458000.5)
- Uncertainty parameter 0
- Observation arc: 85.46 yr (31,214 days)
- Aphelion: 2.9213 AU
- Perihelion: 2.2352 AU
- Semi-major axis: 2.5783 AU
- Eccentricity: 0.1331
- Orbital period (sidereal): 4.14 yr (1,512 days)
- Mean anomaly: 324.91°
- Mean motion: 0° 14^{m} 17.16^{s} / day
- Inclination: 15.915°
- Longitude of ascending node: 123.74°
- Argument of perihelion: 266.02°

Physical characteristics
- Dimensions: 13.041±0.106 km 14.705±0.091 km 17.47 km (calculated); 20.68±0.79 km 23.06±4.95 km 24.65±0.36 km
- Synodic rotation period: 10.36±0.05 h
- Geometric albedo: 0.116±0.022; 0.147±0.013; 0.17±0.08; 0.21 (assumed); 0.3012±0.1397
- Spectral type: Tholen = S · S B–V = 0.900; U–B = 0.459
- Absolute magnitude (H): 11.00; 11.1; 11.14; 11.53±0.15

1215 Boyer, provisional designation 1932 BA, is a stony Eunomian asteroid from the central region of the asteroid belt, approximately 20 kilometers in diameter. It was discovered by astronomer Alfred Schmitt in 1932, who named it after French astronomer and college Louis Boyer.

== Discovery ==
Boyer was discovered on 19 January 1932, by French astronomer Alfred Schmitt at the Algiers Observatory in Algeria, North Africa. Eight days later, it was independently discovered by Karl Reinmuth at Heidelberg Observatory in Germany. The body's observation arc begins at Algiers with its official discovery observation.

== Classification and orbit ==
Boyer is a member of the Eunomia family (502), the most prominent family in the intermediate main-belt, which mostly consists of stony asteroids. Conversely, Boyer has also been grouped into the Maria family (506).

It orbits the Sun at a distance of 2.2–2.9 AU once every 4 years and 2 months (1,512 days). Its orbit has an eccentricity of 0.13 and an inclination of 16° with respect to the ecliptic.

== Physical characteristics ==
In the Tholen classification, Boyer is a common, stony S-type asteroid.

=== Lightcurves ===
In August 2008 and May 2012, two rotational lightcurves of Boyer were obtained from photometric observations by an international collaboration of astronomers studying the rotational properties of Maria asteroids, using the ground-based Wise Observatory in Israel. Lightcurve analysis gave a rotation period of 10.36 hours with a brightness variation of 0.31 and 050 magnitude, respectively (U=2-/2).

=== Diameter and albedo ===
According to the surveys carried out by the Japanese Akari satellite and NASA's Wide-field Infrared Survey Explorer with its subsequent NEOWISE mission, Boyer measures between 13.041 and 24.65 kilometers in diameter and its surface has an albedo between 0.116 and 0.3012.

The Collaborative Asteroid Lightcurve Link assumes an albedo of 0.21, derived from the Eunomia family's largest member and namesake, 15 Eunomia, and calculates a diameter of 17.47 kilometers with an absolute magnitude of 11.1.

== Naming ==
This minor planet was named by the discoverer after his colleague at Algiers Observatory, Louis Boyer (1901–1999), who worked extensively on asteroids and comets. Boyer himself was a discoverer of minor planets at Algiers. He later worked on identifications at Nice observatory. The official naming citation was published by the Minor Planet Center on 1 August 1978 (M.P.C. 4418).
