= 25 Phocaea =

Main-belt Phocaea asteroid

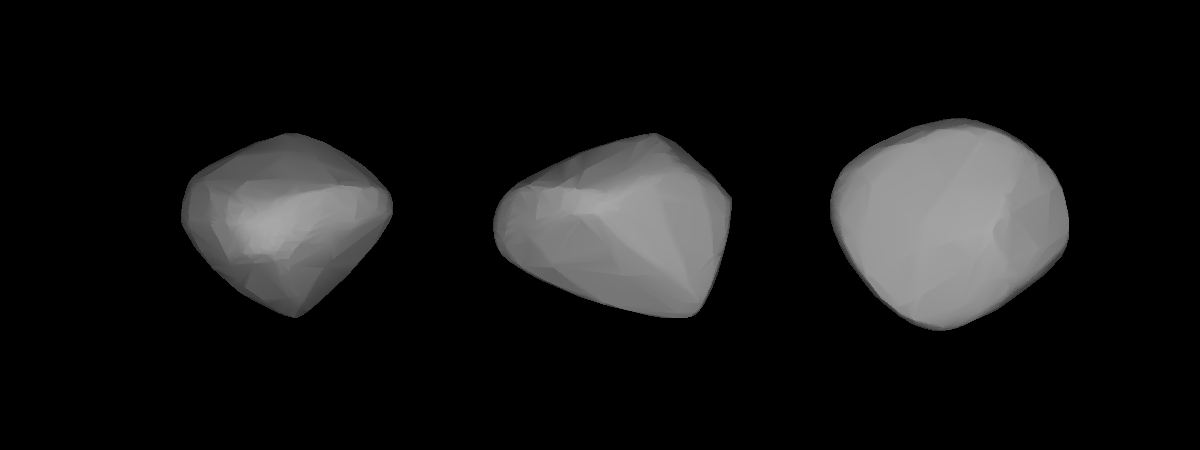
- Lightcurve-base 3D-model of Phocaea

Discovery
- Discovered by: J. Chacornac
- Discovery site: Marseille Obs.
- Discovery date: 6 April 1853

Designations
- Pronunciation: /foʊˈsiːə/
- Named after: Phōcæa (ancient Greek city)
- Alternative designations: 1956 GC
- Minor planet category: main-belt · (inner); Phocaea
- Adjectives: Phocaean /foʊˈsiːən/

Orbital characteristics
- Epoch 4 September 2017 (JD 2458000.5)
- Uncertainty parameter 0
- Observation arc: 157.44 yr (57,504 days)
- Aphelion: 3.0104 AU
- Perihelion: 1.7899 AU
- Semi-major axis: 2.4001 AU
- Eccentricity: 0.2543
- Orbital period (sidereal): 3.72 yr (1,358 days)
- Mean anomaly: 13.891°
- Mean motion: 0° 15^{m} 54.36^{s} / day
- Inclination: 21.606°
- Longitude of ascending node: 214.14°
- Argument of perihelion: 90.245°

Physical characteristics
- Dimensions: 80.19±4.66 km (composite estimate); 61.054±2.463 km
- Mass: (5.99 ± 0.60) × 10^{17} kg (4.2±1.5)×10^{17} kg (Note: Calculated from its standard gravitational parameter GM = 0.028±0.010 km^{3}/s^{2}.)
- Mean density: 2.21±0.44 g/cm^{3} 3.56 g/cm^{3} (Note: Assuming a diameter of 61.1 km.)
- Synodic rotation period: 9.9341±0.0002 h
- Geometric albedo: 0.189±0.005; 0.2310±0.024; 0.350±0.046
- Spectral type: Tholen = S SMASS = S · S B–V = 0.932; U–B = 0.513
- Absolute magnitude (H): 7.83 · 7.90±0.25

25 Phocaea (/foʊˈsiːə/) is a stony asteroid from the inner regions of the asteroid belt, approximately 75 kilometers in diameter. It is the parent body of the Phocaea family. Discovered by Jean Chacornac in 1853, it was named after the ancient Greek city of Phocaea.

== Discovery and naming ==
Phocaea was discovered on 6 April 1853, by French astronomer Jean Chacornac at Marseille Observatory in southern France. It was his first asteroid discovery out of a total of six. The asteroid was named after the ancient Ionian Greek city of Phocaea, modern-day Foça in Turkey, where the founders of Marseille came from. The naming was proposed by French astronomer Benjamin Valz.

== Classification and orbit ==
Phocaea is the parent body and namesake of the Phocaea family (701), a large asteroid family of stony asteroids in the inner main belt.

It orbits the Sun at a distance of 1.8–3.0 AU once every 3 years and 9 months (1,358 days). Its orbit has an eccentricity of 0.25 and an inclination of 22° with respect to the ecliptic. The body's observation arc begins at Vienna Observatory in March 1860, almost 7 years after its official discovery observation at Marseille.

== Physical characteristics ==
Phocaea is a stony S-type asteroid in both the Tholen and SMASS classification, and has also been characterized as such by others.

Photometric observations of this asteroid at the Organ Mesa Observatory in Las Cruces, New Mexico during 2010 gave a lightcurve with a period of 9.9341 ± 0.0002 hours. The brightness near the deepest minimum of the light curve showed changes with phase angle, which is the result of shadows extending across surface irregularities. Several other lightcurves have also been obtained.

Phocaea has also been studied by radar.

According to the surveys carried out by the Infrared Astronomical Satellite IRAS, the Japanese Akari satellite and the NEOWISE mission of NASA's Wide-field Infrared Survey Explorer, Phocaea measures between 61.05 and 83.21 kilometers in diameter and its surface has an albedo between 0.189 and 0.350.

The Collaborative Asteroid Lightcurve Link adopts the results obtained by IRAS, that is, an albedo of 0.2310 and a diameter of 75.13 kilometers based on an absolute magnitude of 7.83.

The asteroid has a mass of (5.99 ± 0.60) × 10^{17} kilograms and a mean density of 2.21±0.44 grams per cubic centimeters, which lies approximately in between the density of limestone and concrete/gravel.
