= André-Adolphe-Eugène Disdéri =

French photographer (1819–1889)

André Adolphe-Eugène Disdéri
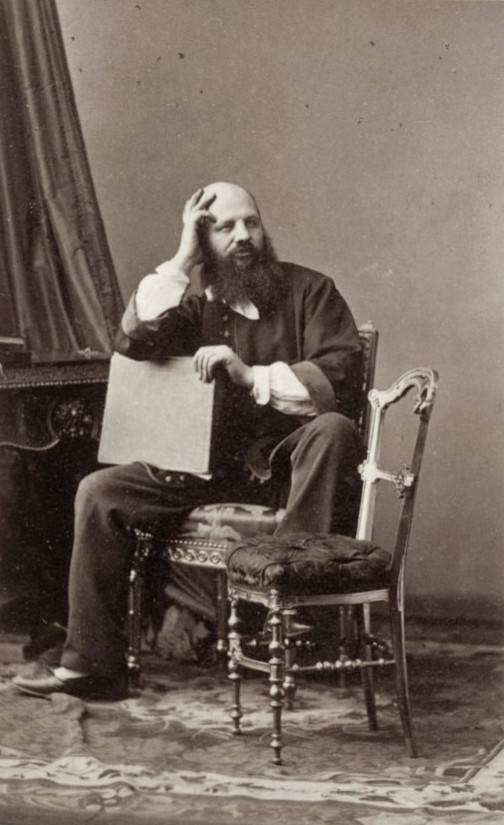
- Self-portrait, c. 1860 (Paris, Musée d'Orsay)
- Born: 28 March 1819; Paris, France
- Died: October 4, 1889 (aged 70); Paris, France
- Occupation: Photographer
- Years active: 1846–1870
- Known for: Photographic career as a daguerreotypist

Signature
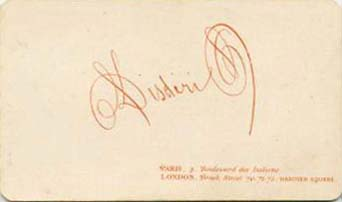

André Adolphe-Eugène Disdéri (French: [ɑ̃dʁe adɔlf(ə) øʒɛn(ə) dizdeʁi]; 28 March 1819 – 4 October 1889) was a French photographer who started his photographic career as a daguerreotypist but gained greater fame for patenting his version of the carte de visite, a small photographic image which was mounted on a card. Disdéri, a brilliant showman, made this system of mass-production portraiture world famous.

== Early life ==
Disdéri began his working life in a number of occupations, while also studying art. He started as a daguerreotypist in Brest in 1848 or 1849 but in December 1852 or January 1853 he moved to Nîmes. There he received assistance from Édouard Boyer and Joseph Jean Pierre Laurent with his photography-related chemistry experiments. After a year in Nîmes he moved to Paris, enabling easy access to people who would be the subjects of his cartes de visite.

== Disdéri and the carte de visite ==
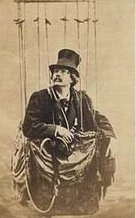
French carte de visite of Nadar

Photographs had previously served as calling cards, but Disdéri's invention of the paper carte de visite (i.e. "visiting card") photograph second enabled the mass production of photographs. On 27 November 1854 he patented the system of printing ten photographs on a single sheet (although there is no evidence that a system printing more than eight actually materialized). This was the first patent ever for a carte de visite. Disdéri's's cartes de visite were 6×9 cm, about the size of conventional (nonphotographic) visiting cards of the time, and were made by a camera with four lenses and a sliding plate holder; a design inspired by the stereoscopic cameras.

The novelty quickly spread throughout the world. According to a German visitor, Disdéri's studio became "really the Temple of Photography – a place unique in its luxury and elegance. Daily he sells three to four thousand francs worth of portraits".

The fact that these photos could be reproduced inexpensively and in great quantity brought about the decline of the daguerreotype and ushered in a carte de visite craze as they became enormously popular throughout Europe and the United States. Due to the large increase in publicity, the demand for the portraits increased.

The great French photographer Nadar, who was Disdéri's competitor, wrote about the new invention in his autobiographical "Quand j'étais photographe", "about the appearance of Disdéri and Carte de Visite. It spelled disaster. Either you had to succumb – that is to say, follow the trend – or resign."

=== Twin-lens reflex camera ===
Disdéri also invented the twin-lens reflex camera.

== Later years and death ==
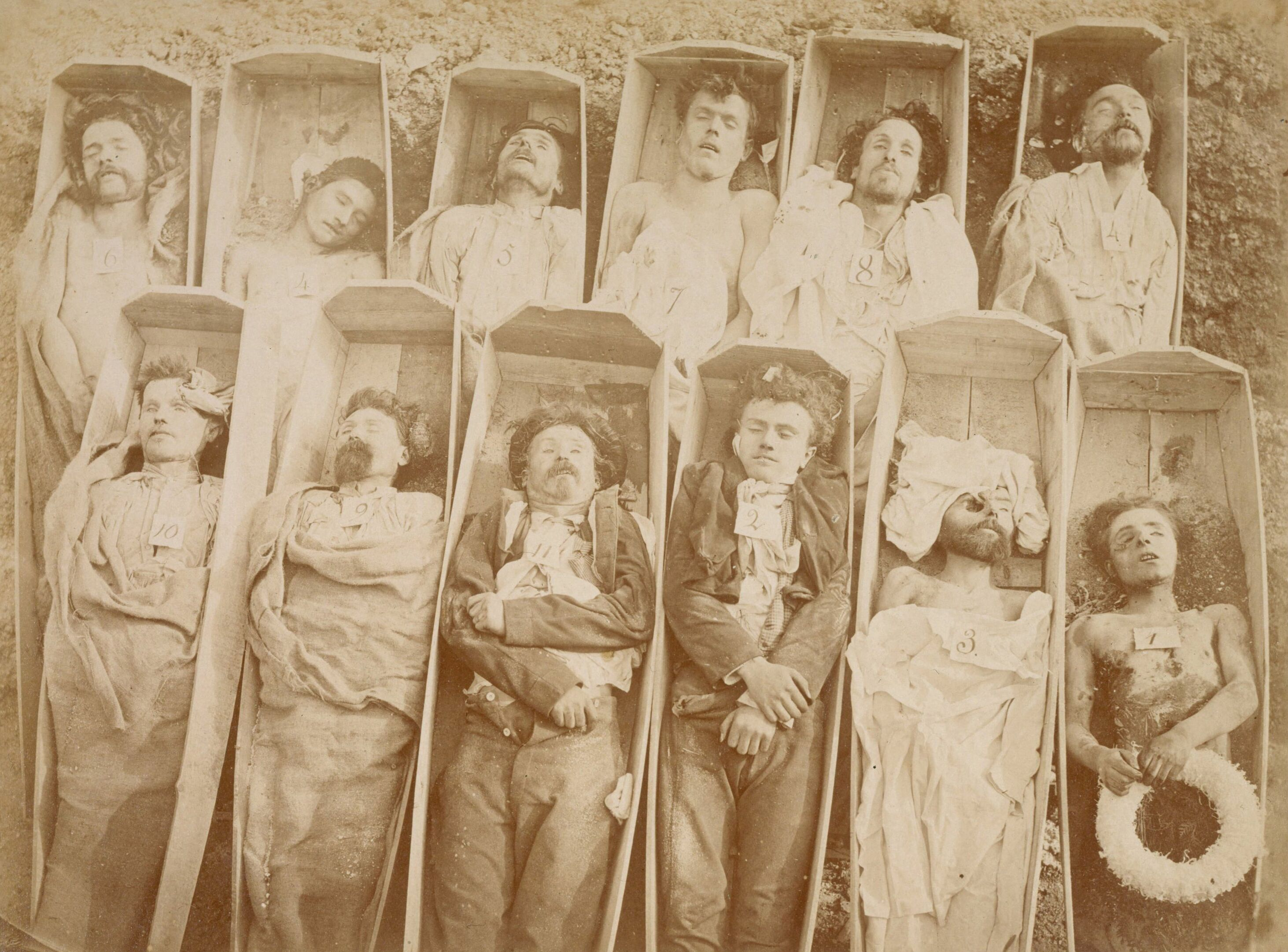
Dead Communards, 1871

In the aftermath of the Paris Commune of 1871, Disdéri recorded an image of dead Communards.

At the pinnacle of his career, Disdéri had been extremely wealthy and renowned; but like another photographer, Mathew Brady, he is reported to have ended his life penniless. He died on 4 October 1889 in the Hôpital Ste. Anne in Paris, "an institution for indigents, alcoholics, and the mentally ill". He was a victim of his own invention. The system which he invented and popularized was so easy to imitate that photographers all over the world took advantage of it.

== Gallery ==
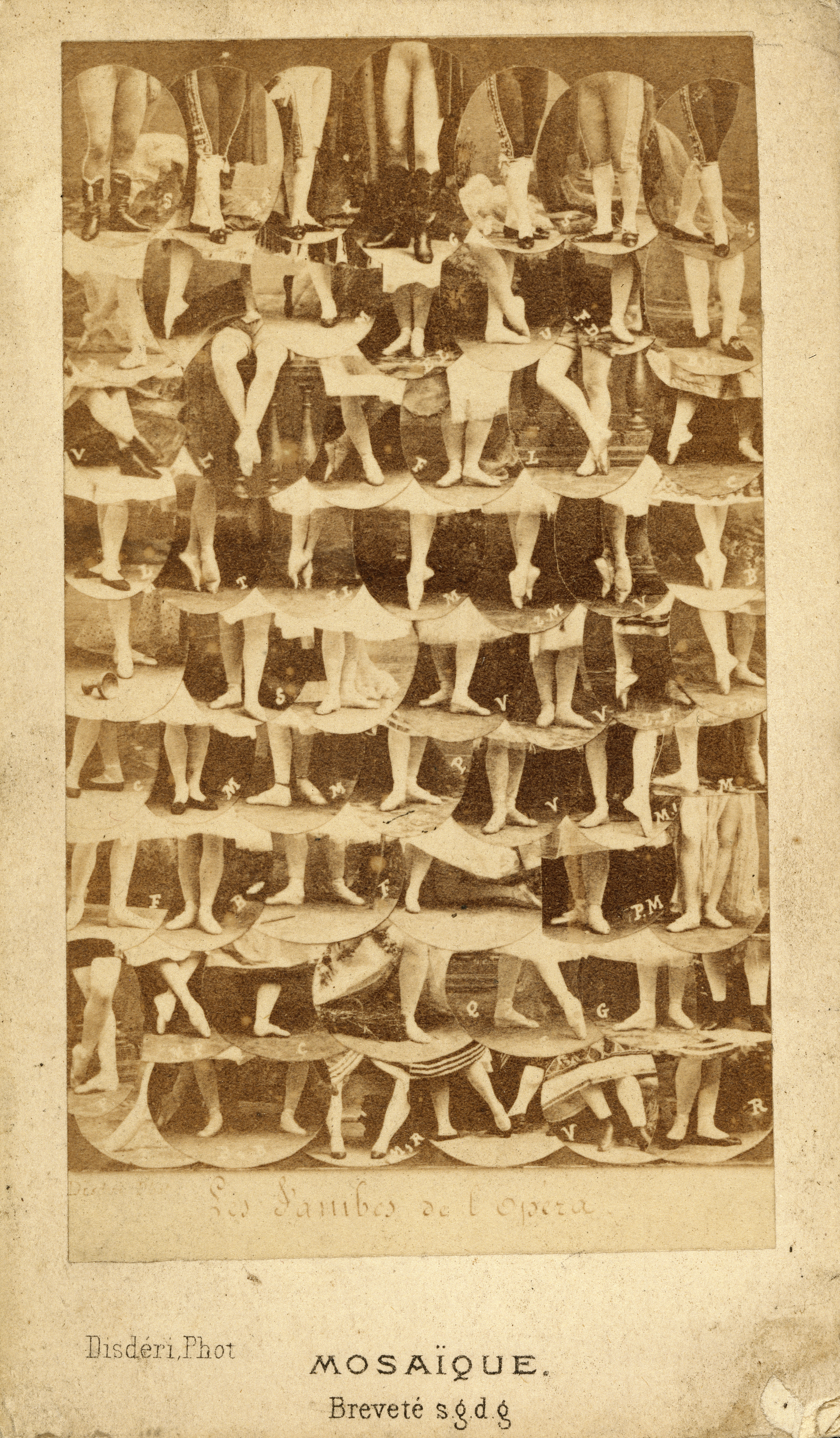
"Les Jambes de l'opera, Mosaïque Breveté s.d.g.d.", c. 1862. Los Angeles, Getty Center.

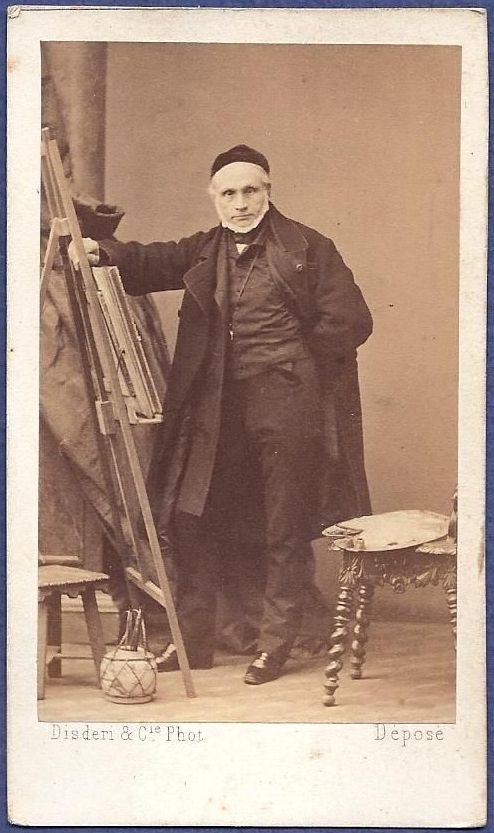
Le peintre Joseph-Nicolas Robert-Fleury, années 1860

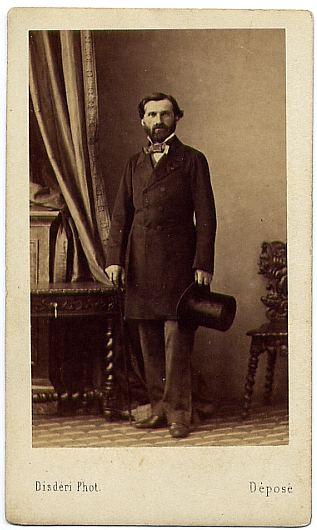
Portrait de Giuseppe Verdi, au format carte-de-visite. Paris, Musée d'Orsay.

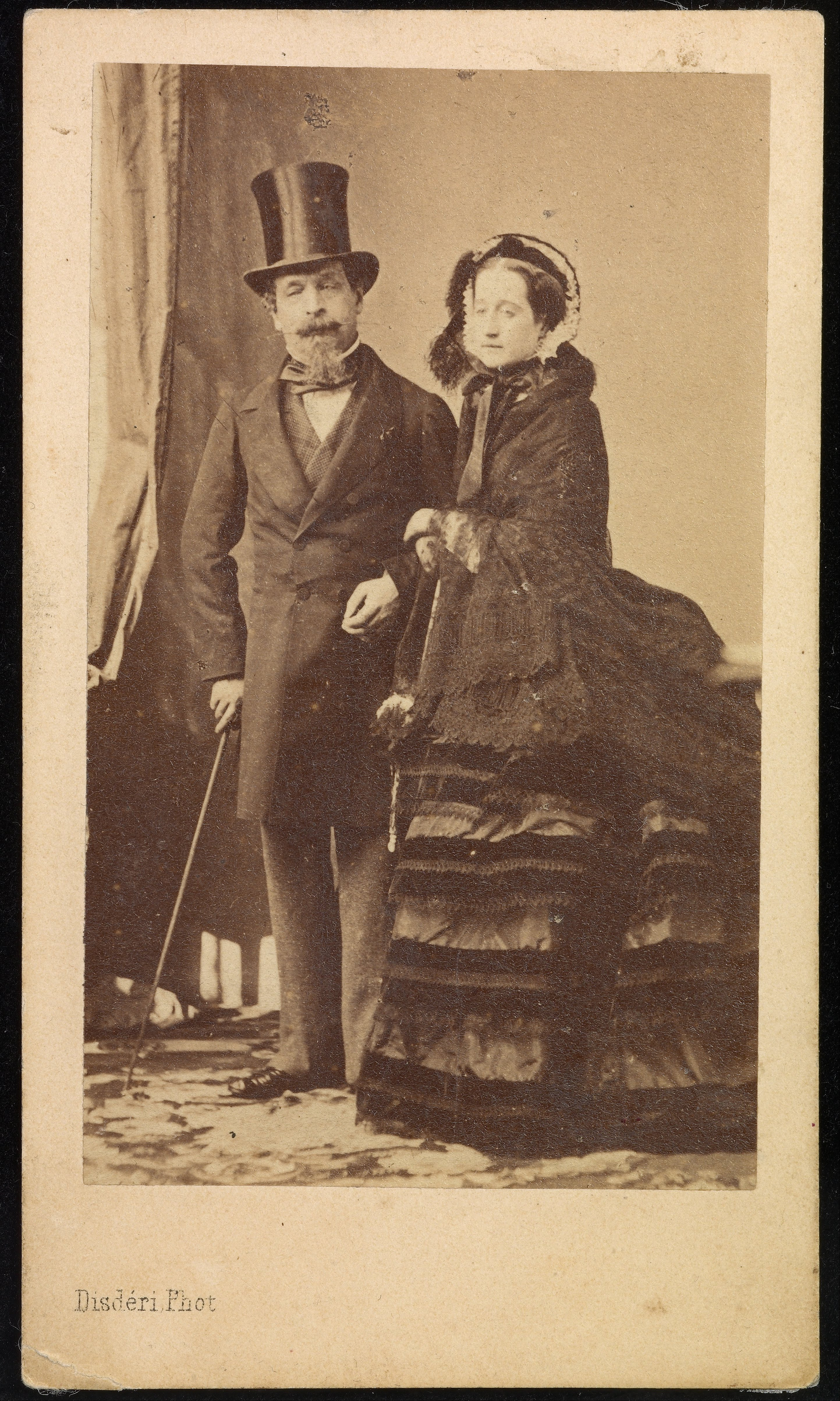
Emperor Napoleon III et Empress Eugénie (c. 1870), Los Angeles, Getty Center.

== Sources ==
- McCauley, Elizabeth Anne. "Carte de visite." Oxford Companion to the Photograph, ed. Robin Lenman. Oxford: Oxford University Press, 2005. ISBN 0-19-866271-8.
- Wilder, Kelley E. "Disdéri, André Adolphe-Eugène." Oxford Companion to the Photograph, ed. Robin Lenman. Oxford: Oxford University Press, 2005. ISBN 0-19-866271-8.

== Archives ==
- 19th Century Actors Carte de Visite Collection. 1860–1885. 605 photographic prints on carte de visite mounts; 4 x 2 1/2 in. At University of Washington Libraries, Special Collections.
