= Alfred Schmitt =

French astronomer (1907–1975)

Alfred Schmitt (30 November 1907 – 2 April 1975) was a French astronomer and discoverer of minor planets. He worked at the Algiers Observatory in the 1930s and 1940s, later at the Royal Observatory of Belgium in Uccle, Belgium, and from 1955 to 1958 served as technical director of the Quito Astronomical Observatory in Ecuador.

Schmitt worked mainly in astrometry, the positional measurement of celestial objects, and was active in the observation of minor planets and comets. The Minor Planet Center credits him with the discovery of four numbered minor planets.

== Career ==
Schmitt was associated with the Algiers Observatory during a period in which the observatory was active in photographic astrometry and the observation of minor planets. The UNESCO Portal to the Heritage of Astronomy lists him among the astronomers of the Algiers-Bouzareah Observatory, where he worked during the 1930s and 1940s.

During the 1950s, Schmitt worked at the Royal Observatory of Belgium in Uccle. Several of his minor-planet discoveries were made from Uccle during this period.

From November 1955 to April 1958, Schmitt served in Ecuador as technical director of the Quito Astronomical Observatory. According to the Quito Observatory, he arrived under UNESCO sponsorship, worked mainly in astrometry, made some astrophysical observations and attempted to modernize the observatory's meridian circle. An obituary published in L'Astronomie also notes his work in Quito during this period.

Schmitt's publications were generally signed A. Schmitt, following a common scientific convention of the period.

== Minor planet discoveries ==
Schmitt is credited by the Minor Planet Center with the discovery of four numbered minor planets:

- 1215 Boyer, discovered on 19 January 1932
- 1622 Chacornac, discovered on 15 March 1952
- 1614 Goldschmidt, discovered on 18 April 1952
- 3156 Ellington, discovered on 15 March 1953

== 1215 Boyer and 1617 Alschmitt ==
In 1932, while working at the Algiers Observatory, Schmitt discovered the asteroid later named 1215 Boyer. He named it in honour of his colleague Louis Boyer, a French astronomer and minor-planet discoverer who also worked at Algiers.

Boyer later named the asteroid 1617 Alschmitt in Schmitt's honour. The name combines the initial of Schmitt's first name with his surname.

== Personal life ==
Schmitt married the French astronomer Odette Bancilhon, who had also worked at the Algiers Observatory. After their marriage, she published under the name O. Schmitt-Bancilhon.

== See also ==
- List of minor planet discoverers
- Algiers Observatory
- Quito Astronomical Observatory
- Odette Bancilhon
- Louis Boyer (astronomer)
