= Phocaea family =

Family of asteroids

The Phocaea family (/foʊˈsiːə/ foh-SEE-ə; adj. Phocaean; FIN: 701) is a collisional family of asteroids located between 2.25 and 2.5 AU in the inner region of the asteroid belt. Phocaea asteroids are of stony S-type composition and have orbits with eccentricities greater than 0.1 and inclinations between 18 and 32°. The family has an estimated age of 2.2 billion years and derives its name from its most massive member, 25 Phocaea which is about 75 km in diameter. Several Phocaean asteroids are also Mars-crossers.

== Phocaea family region ==
The Phocaea family region contains other collisional families such as the recently identified carbonaceous, Tamara family, named after its potentially largest member 326 Tamara. The family has an estimated age of 264 million years. Several clumps around 290 Bruna (Bruna family), 1192 Prisma and 6246 Komurotoru, as well as (17628) 1996 FB_{5}, (19536) 1999 JM_{4} and (26142) 1994 PL1 have also been detected.

== Members ==
Name	a	e	i
25 Phocaea	2.400	0.255	21.584°
1090 Sumida	2.360	0.220	21.505°
4388 Jürgenstock	2.339	0.279	24.588°
