= 1333 Cevenola =

Main-belt asteroid binary

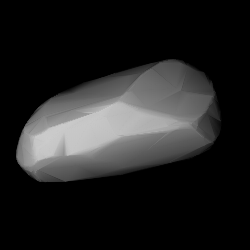
- Shape model of Cevenola from its lightcurve

Discovery
- Discovered by: O. Bancilhon
- Discovery site: Algiers Obs.
- Discovery date: 20 February 1934

Designations
- Pronunciation: Occitan: [seveˈnɔlɔ]
- Named after: Cévennes (mountains, France)
- Alternative designations: 1934 DA · 1951 EX
- Minor planet category: main-belt · Eunomia

Orbital characteristics
- Epoch 16 February 2017 (JD 2457800.5)
- Uncertainty parameter 0
- Observation arc: 82.31 yr (30,064 days)
- Aphelion: 2.9864 AU
- Perihelion: 2.2775 AU
- Semi-major axis: 2.6319 AU
- Eccentricity: 0.1347
- Orbital period (sidereal): 4.27 yr (1,560 days)
- Mean anomaly: 203.92°
- Mean motion: 0° 13^{m} 50.88^{s} / day
- Inclination: 14.641°
- Longitude of ascending node: 115.10°
- Argument of perihelion: 336.10°
- Known satellites: 1

Physical characteristics
- Dimensions: 11.2±1.4 km 11.31±0.99 km 14.54 km (calculated); 15.24±0.74 km 15.262±0.209 km 17.146±0.237 km
- Synodic rotation period: 4.877±0.001 h 4.8788±0.0004 h 4.87932±0.00005 h 4.880±0.003 h 4.88±0.02 h 4.88 h
- Geometric albedo: 0.1662±0.0378; 0.209±0.030; 0.21 (assumed); 0.214±0.081; 0.380±0.043
- Spectral type: Sq · S
- Absolute magnitude (H): 11.4 · 11.5 · 12.05±0.12

1333 Cevenola, provisional designation 1934 DA, is a binary Eunomian asteroid from the asteroid belt, approximately 15 kilometers in diameter. It was discovered on 20 February 1934, by French astronomer Odette Bancilhon at Algiers Observatory, Algeria in Northern Africa. It was named after the French mountain-range Cévennes, via the Occitan feminine adjective/demonym cevenòla (cévenole in French).

== Description ==
The S-type asteroid is a member of the Eunomia family. More specifically, it is estimated to have a Sq spectral type, which would also agree with its family classification. It orbits the Sun at a distance of 2.3–3.0 AU once every 4 years and 3 months (1,560 days). Its orbit has an eccentricity of 0.13 and an inclination of 15° with respect to the ecliptic. As no precoveries were taken, and no prior identifications were made, the body's observation arc begins with its official discovery observation.

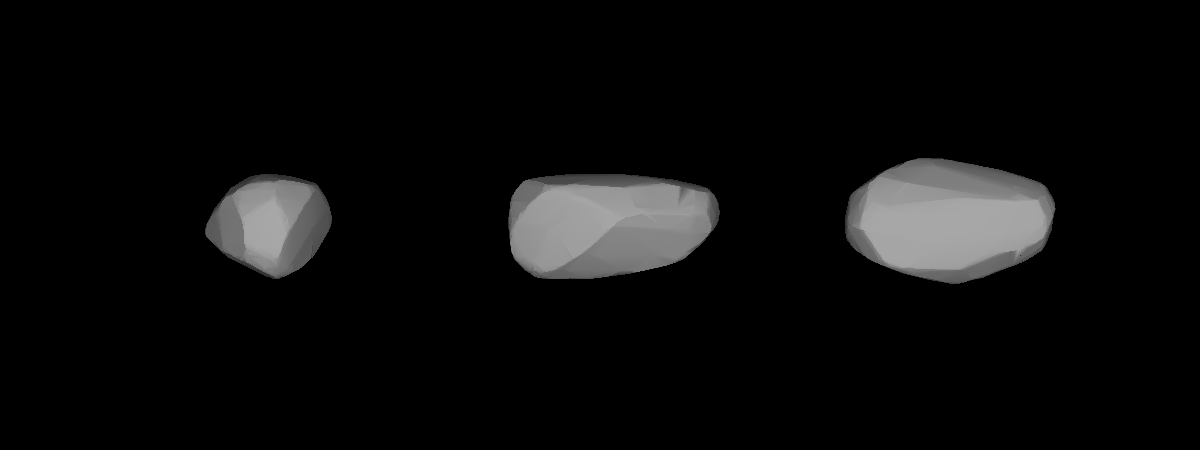
Lightcurve-based 3D-model of Cevenola

Photometric lightcurve observations gave a well determined rotation period of 4.88 hours with a brightness variation between 0.57 and 1.1 magnitude (U=3/3/3/3/3). The asteroid has a geometric albedo of 0.21, as measured by the Japanese Infrared Satellite, Akari, and by Spitzer's Infrared Spectrograph (IRS). Observations by the NEO-/Wide-field Infrared Survey Explorer missions gave a somewhat different result of 0.17 and 0.38, respectively. Determinations of the asteroid's diameter resulted in 11 kilometers for Spitzer and WISE/NEOWISE, 15 kilometer for AKARAI and the LCDB's best calculations, and 17 kilometers for the preliminary results of the NEOWISE mission.

In October 2008, the discovery of a satellite in orbit of Cevenola was announced. The moon measures approximately 6 kilometers in diameter.

The asteroid was named after the Cévennes, a mountain range in southern France at the eastern rim of the Massif Central. Naming citation was first mentioned in The Names of the Minor Planets by Paul Herget in 1955 (H 121).

Satellite
Discovery
- Discovery date: 12 October 2008 (announced)
- Detection method: Light curve

Orbital characteristics
- Satellite of: 1333 Cevenola

Physical characteristics
- Dimensions: 6.0±0.1 km
- Volume: 113 km^{3} (assumed)
