= Massalia family =

Family of asteroids in the inner asteroid belt

The Massalia family (adj. Massalian; FIN: 404) is a family of asteroids in the inner asteroid belt, named after its parent body, 20 Massalia. It consists of S-type asteroids with very low inclinations, straddling the 1:2 resonances with Mars. There are more than 6,000 known Massalian asteroids.

== Characteristics ==
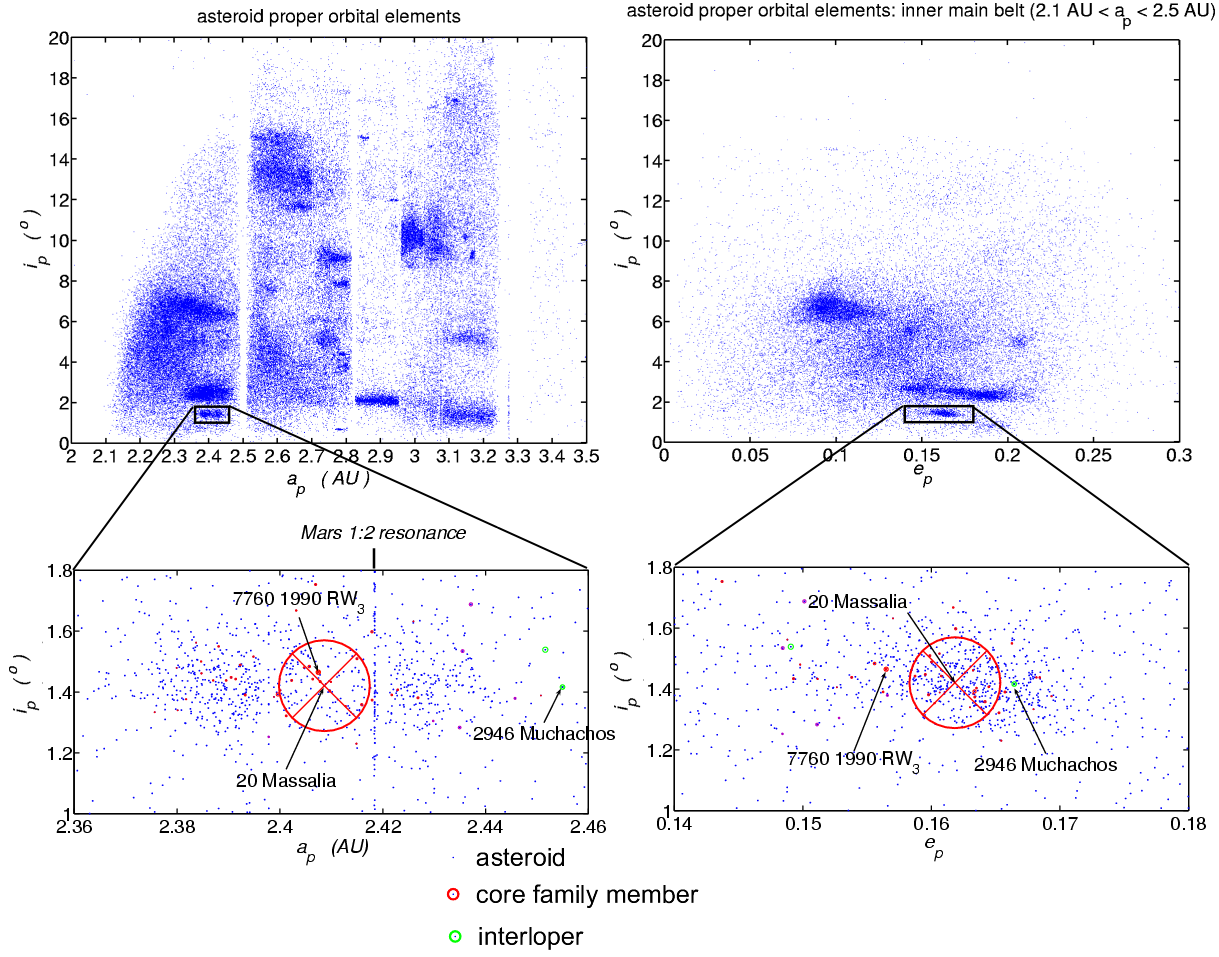
Location and structure of the Massalia family

This is a definite cratering family consisting of 20 Massalia and a mass of small fragments excavated from Massalia's surface by an impact. Massalia is by far the largest member with a diameter of about 150 km, while the next largest body, (7760) 1990 RW3 is only about 7 km in diameter. The mass of all the small members is negligible, less than about 1%, compared to Massalia.

The family is fairly young, estimated to have been created by an impact 100 to 200 million years ago. It has a distinctly two-lobed appearance in proper a--e space, with one lobe centered at semi-major axes of 2.38 AU, the other at about 2.43 AU, with the parent body Massalia itself located in between. The bodies in the lobes tend to be smaller on average than those in the central region. It has been shown that this structure is likely caused by slow drift of the semi-major axis caused by the Yarkovsky and YORP effects. Details of the lobes were used to calculate the age of the family.

A strong 1:2 orbital resonance with Mars crosses the family at 2.42 AU, and appears responsible for some "leakage" of family members away from the area into higher inclination orbits.

The Massalia family or a recent minor collision within it may be the source for the prominent α dust band, the other candidate being a recent collision within the Themis family.

== Location and size ==
The Massalian asteroids are located at very low inclinations, straddling the 1:2 resonances with Mars.

A HCM numerical analysis by Zappalà in 1995, determined a group of core family members, whose proper orbital elements lie in the approximate ranges

	a_{p}	e_{p}	i_{p}
min	2.37 AU	0.143	1.2°
max	2.45 AU	0.175^{*}	1.75°

^{*} The Zappalà core members only reach e=0.170 but inspection of more modern proper elements reveals that the family extends at least to e=0.175

At the present epoch, the range of osculating orbital elements of these core members is

	a	e	i
min	2.37 AU	0.124	0.4°
max	2.45 AU	0.211	2.35°

The analysis by Zappalà found 42 core members in 1995, while a HCM-analysis by Nesvorný in 2014 yielded 6,424 member asteroids based on the proper elements of a catalog of 398,000 bodies.

=== List ===
Name/designation	Number	Proper semimajor axis (AU)	Proper inclination (degrees)	Proper eccentricity	Diameter (km)	Group
Massalia	20	2.409	1.421	0.162	150 (measured)	Primary member
Muchachos	2946	2.455	1.417	0.166	9 (estimated)	Interloper
Puccini	4579	2.400	1.392	0.163	8 (estimated)	Core member
Rameau	4734	2.416	1.359	0.164	5 (estimated)	Core member
Švejcar	5031	2.436	1.535	0.148	7 (estimated)	Interloper
Hessen	5846	2.435	0.913	0.163	5 (estimated)	Interloper
1990 RW3	7760	2.407	1.465	0.156	9 (estimated)	Core member

== Interlopers ==
A number of Interlopers have been identified, which share the same orbital elements as the true family members, but cannot have come from the same cratering event because of spectral (hence, compositional) differences. 2946 Muchachos and some other bodies were noted as interlopers during a detailed study of the family, while 2316 Jo-Ann is seen to have the wrong spectrum by inspection of the PDS asteroid taxonomy data set. Muchachos is larger than any of the true family members apart from Massalia itself.
