= Jean Chacornac =

French astronomer (1823–1873)

Minor planets discovered: 6
25 Phocaea	6 April 1853	MPC
33 Polyhymnia	28 October 1854	MPC
34 Circe	6 April 1855	MPC
38 Leda	12 January 1856	MPC
39 Laetitia	8 February 1856	MPC
59 Elpis	12 September 1860	MPC

Jean Chacornac (21 June 1823 – 6 September 1873) was a French astronomer and discoverer of a comet and several asteroids.

He was born in Lyon and died in Saint-Jean-en-Royans, southeastern France. Working in Marseille and Paris, he discovered six asteroids in the asteroid belt (see table) and C/1852 K1 (Chacornac), a parabolic comet in 1852. This comet is thought to be the source of the current Eta Eridanids meteors. He also independently discovered 20 Massalia, which discovery is credited to the Italian astronomer Annibale de Gasparis, however.

Jean Chacornac was awarded the Lalande Prize in 1855, 1856 and in 1863. The asteroid 1622 Chacornac and the lunar crater Chacornac are named in his honour.
