= Chacornac (crater) =

Crater on the Moon

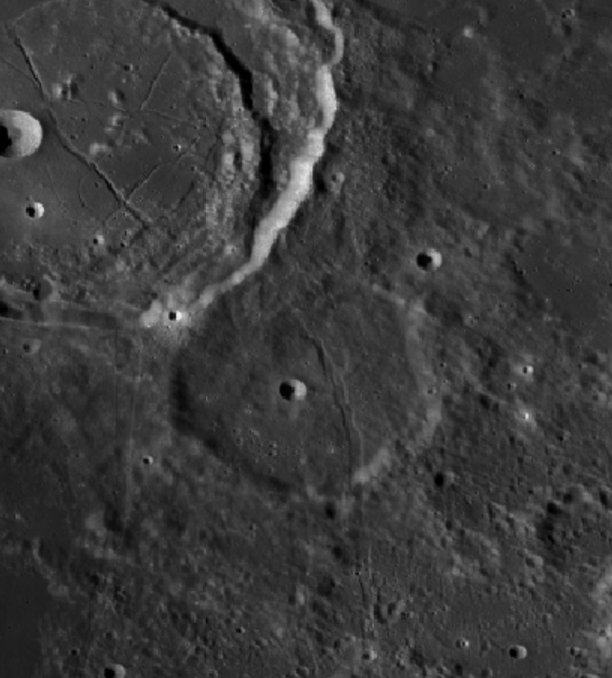
- LRO image
- Coordinates: 29.8°N 31.7°E
- Diameter: 50.44 km (31.34 mi)
- Depth: 1.45 km (0.90 mi)
- Colongitude: 329° at sunrise
- Eponym: Jean Chacornac

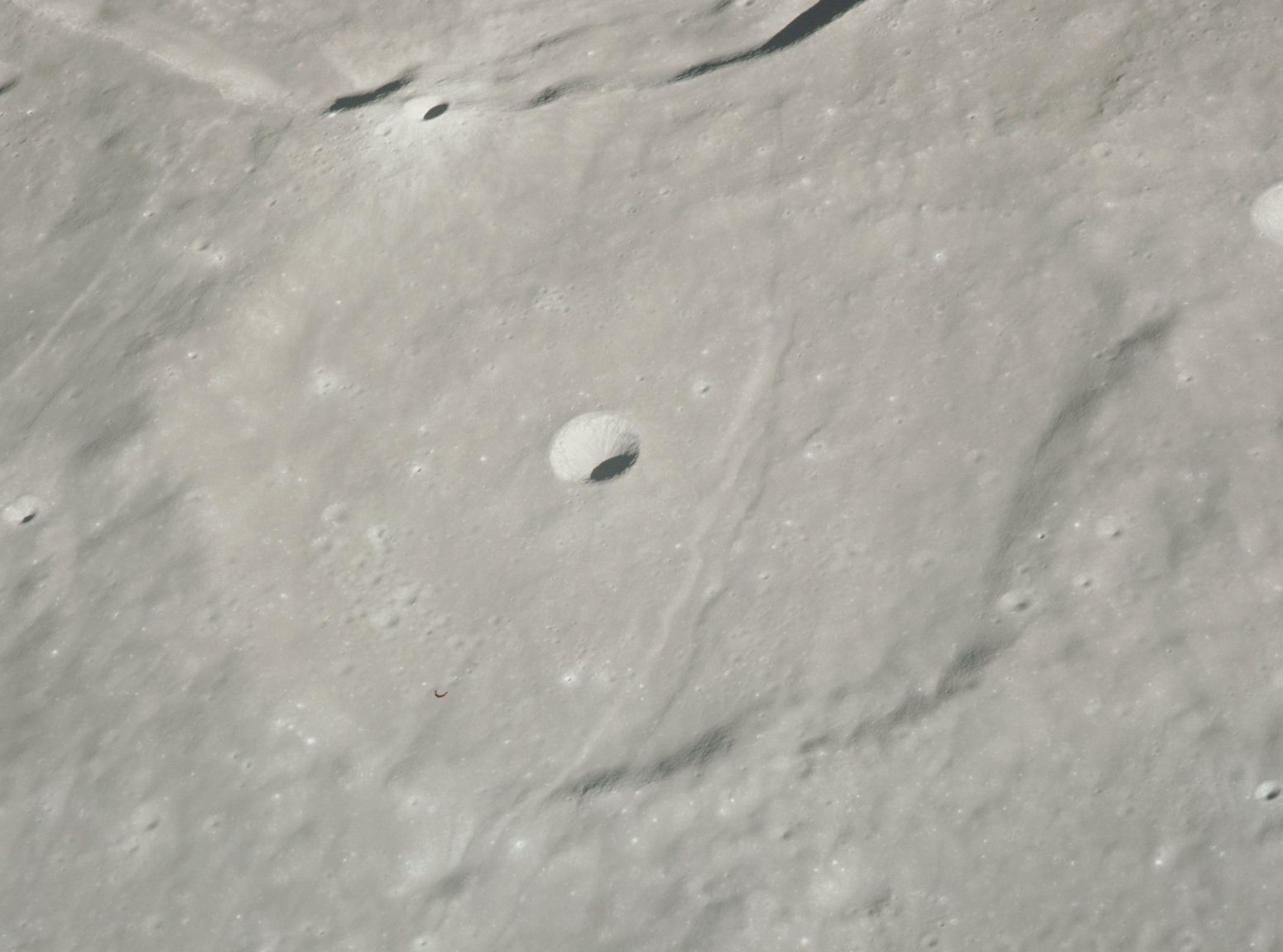
Apollo 15 image

Chacornac is an irregular lunar impact crater attached to the southeast rim of the crater Posidonius. It lies just to the east of the Mare Serenitatis, and north of the crater Le Monnier.

The Chacornac crater has a low depth to diameter ratio of 2.8%. Its worn rim forms a somewhat distorted, pentagonal outline, and appears uneven, especially in the northwest where it is attached to the rim of Posidonius. The flooded floor is irregular and uneven, and contains a system of faint rilles called the Rimae Chacornac, which cross the crater wall to the south. There is one distinct interior crater, Chacornac A, which is slightly offset from the midpoint. There is no central peak, and no trace of a ray system. The ground around the crater is rugged, with a hilly, sloping rampart to the west.

This crater is named after French astronomer Jean Chacornac (1823–1873). His name was added to lunar nomenclature during the 19th century by the British selenographers William R. Birt and John Lee. Its designation was officially adopted by the International Astronomical Union in 1935.

== Satellite craters ==
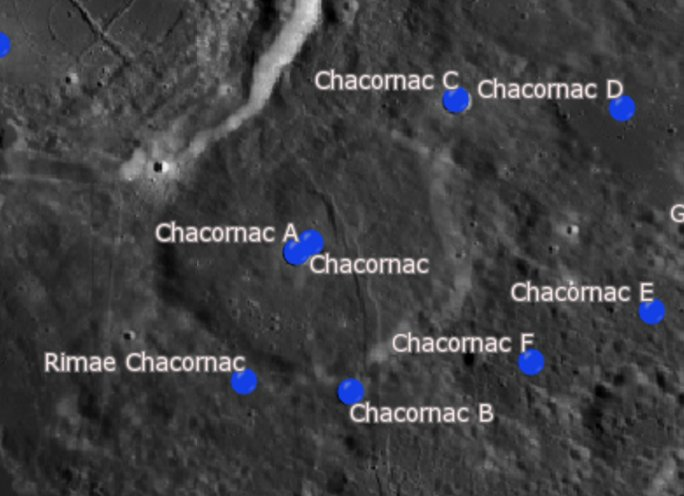
Satellite craters of Chacornac

By convention these features are identified on lunar maps by placing the letter on the side of the crater midpoint that is closest to Chacornac.

Chacornac	Latitude	Longitude	Diameter
A	29.8° N	31.5° E	5 km
B	29.8° N	31.9° E	6 km
C	30.8° N	32.6° E	4 km
D	30.6° N	33.6° E	26 km
E	29.4° N	33.7° E	22 km
F	29.2° N	32.9° E	26 km
