= Jean Valz =

French politician

Jean Valz (1746–1794) was a French politician.

== Biography ==
Valz was born in 1746 in Gard.

He was a member of the bourgeois class, and served as an administrator in the city of Nîmes, Gard.

He was guillotined in 1794 in Nîmes.
