= 20 Massalia =

Main-belt Massalian asteroid

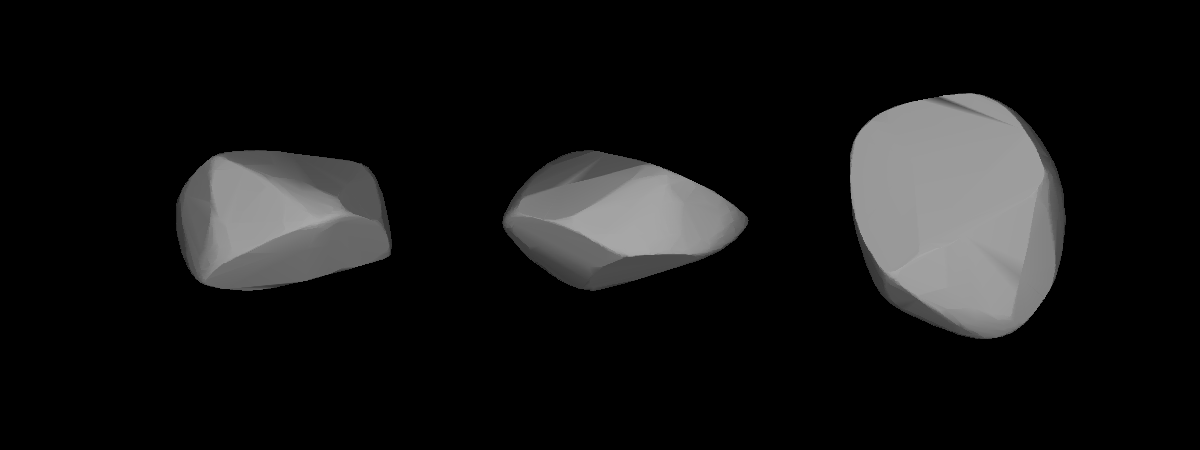
- Lightcurve-based 3D-model of Massalia

Discovery
- Discovered by: A. de Gasparis
- Discovery site: Naples Obs.
- Discovery date: 19 September 1852

Designations
- Pronunciation: /mæˈseɪliə/
- Named after: Marseille (French city)
- Alternative designations: Massilia /mæˈsɪliə/
- Minor planet category: main belt · Massalia
- Adjectives: Massalian /mæˈseɪliən/

Orbital characteristics
- Epoch 23 March 2018 (JD 2458200.5)
- Uncertainty parameter 0
- Observation arc: 164.08 yr (59,929 d)
- Aphelion: 2.7514 AU
- Perihelion: 2.0662 AU
- Semi-major axis: 2.4088 AU
- Eccentricity: 0.1422
- Orbital period (sidereal): 3.74 yr (1,366 d)
- Mean anomaly: 12.443°
- Mean motion: 0° 15^{m} 48.96^{s} / day
- Inclination: 0.7087°
- Longitude of ascending node: 206.11°
- Time of perihelion: 30 July 2025
- Argument of perihelion: 256.58°

Physical characteristics
- Dimensions: 160×145×132 km 160×145×130 km
- Mean diameter: 106.5+4.8 −2.8 km/113.5+6.2 −9.9 km (LCI + occ); 145±2 km (thermophysical)
- Mass: (4.33±0.12)×10^{18} kg (Note: Calculated from its standard gravitational parameter GM = 0.289±0.008 km^{3}/s^{2}.)
- Mean density: 2.71–6.85 g/cm^{3} (calculated)
- Synodic rotation period: 8.097587+0.000003 −0.000001 h
- Pole ecliptic longitude: 111°+16° −15° or 293°±17°
- Pole ecliptic latitude: 77°+17° −7° or 76°+20° −10°
- Geometric albedo: 0.210
- Spectral type: Tholen = S SMASS = S
- Apparent magnitude: 8.3 to 12.0
- Absolute magnitude (H): 6.50
- Angular diameter: 0.186" to 0.058"

20 Massalia is a stony asteroid and the parent body of the Massalia family located in the inner region of the asteroid belt, approximately 145 kilometers (90 miles) in diameter. Discovered by Italian astronomer Annibale de Gasparis on 19 September 1852, it was named for the Latin name of the French city of Marseille, from which the independent discover Jean Chacornac sighted it the following night. It was the first asteroid that was not assigned an iconic symbol by its discoverer.

It comes to opposition 179 degrees from the Sun on 12 July 2027.

== Discovery ==
Massalia was discovered on 19 September 1852, by Annibale de Gasparis at Naples Observatory in Italy, and also found independently the next night by Jean Chacornac at Marseilles Observatory, France. It was Chacornac's discovery that was announced first. In the nineteenth century the variant spelling Massilia was often used. Asteroids discovered prior to Massalia were assigned iconic symbols, like the ones traditionally used to designate the planets.

However, astronomers had begun to phase out this practice with the discovery of 16 Psyche in March 1852, and 20 Massalia (being the first object in the Solar System with a non-mythological name) was the first asteroid that was not assigned an iconic symbol: indeed the circled number 20 was explicitly proposed as the symbol instead.

== Orbit and classification ==
Massalia is the namesake and the parent body of the Massalia family (404), a very large inner belt asteroid family consisting of stony asteroids with very low inclinations. It is by far the largest body in this family. The remaining family members are fragments ejected by a cratering event on Massalia.

It orbits the Sun in the inner main-belt at a distance of 2.1–2.8 AU once every 3 years and 9 months (1,366 days; semi-major axis of 2.41 AU). Its orbit has an eccentricity of 0.14 and an inclination of 1° with respect to the ecliptic.

== Physical characteristics ==
Massalia has an above-average density for S-type asteroids, similar to the density of silicate rocks. As such, it appears to be a solid unfractured body, a rarity among asteroids of its size. Apart from the few largest bodies over 400 km in diameter, such as 1 Ceres and 4 Vesta, most asteroids appear to have been significantly fractured, or are even rubble piles. In 1998, Bange estimated Massalia to have a mass of 5.2×10^{18} kg assuming that 4 Vesta has 1.35×10^{−10} solar mass. The calculation of the mass of Massalia is dependent on the mass of 4 Vesta and perturbation of 44 Nysa.

Light curve analysis indicates that Massalia's pole points towards ecliptic coordinates either (β, λ) = (45°, 10°) or (β, λ) = (45°, 190°) with a 10° uncertainty. This gives an axial tilt of 45° in both cases. The shape reconstruction from light curves has been described as quite spherical with large planar, nonconvex parts of the surface.

In 1988 there was a search for satellites or dust orbiting this asteroid using the UH88 telescope at the Mauna Kea Observatories, but none were found.

In February 2024, water molecules were discovered on 20 Massalia, alongside 7 Iris, marking the first time water molecules were detected on asteroids.
