= Marseille Observatory =

Astronomical observatory located in Marseille, France

- Alternative names: Observatoire de Marseille
- Organization: Observatoire des Science de l'Univers Institut Pythéas
- Observatory code: 014
- Location: Marseille, France
- Coordinates: 43°18′20″N 5°23′41″E
- Altitude: 40 m (130 ft)
- Established: 1702
- Website: www.lam.fr

Telescopes
- 80-cm Foucault (1862): Glass-mirror
- Marseille 0.36-metre (1989): Spectrographic
- Location within France Location within Provence-Alpes-Côte d'Azur
- Related media on Commons

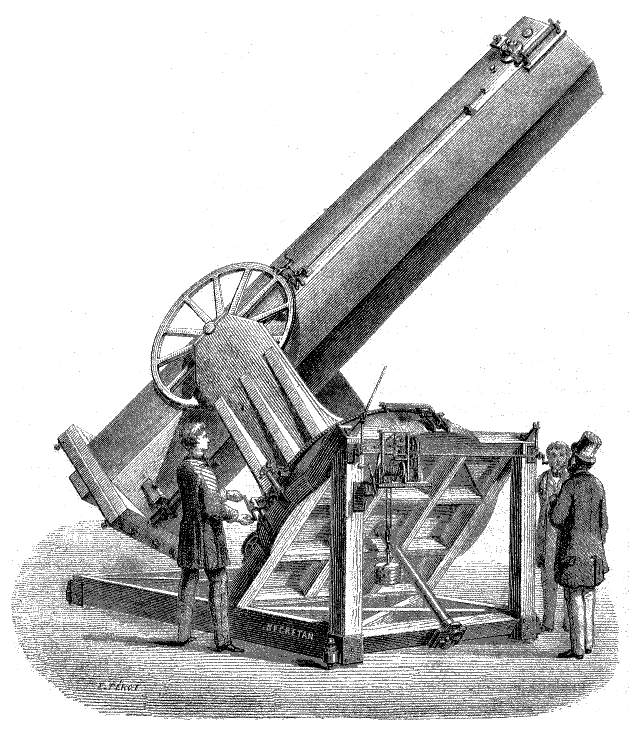
Drawing of the 80 cm Foucault telescope of Marseille

Marseille Observatory (French: Observatoire de Marseille) is an astronomical observatory located in Marseille, France, with a history that goes back to the early 18th century. In its 1877 incarnation, it was the discovery site of a group of galaxies known as Stephan's Quintet, discovered by its director Édouard Stephan. Marseille Observatory is now run as a joint research unit by Aix-Marseille University and the French National Center for Scientific Research (CNRS).

The old Palais Longchamp facilities are a noted tourist attraction in Marseille, and a planetarium was also added in 2001. One of the noted exhibits is the Foucault glass-mirror telescope, and various items from centuries of astronomical activities.

Foucault's telescope is a noted historical example because it was the forerunner of the modern style of big reflecting telescopes which use a minute layer of metal on a figured piece of glass. Before this, the main technology was to make the whole mirror of metal, and it would really be another half-century before silvered glass mirrors really caught on for astronomy. A major change in the 20th century was to shift from using solution to coat the glass with silver to using a vapor deposition process.

== 18th century ==
The observatory was founded in 1701 in Montee des Accoules (a location near Vieux Port, Marseille, France). Antoine Laval was the first director.

The 1761 Transit of Venus was observed from the Marseilles Observatory. A telescope 6 feet long made by James Short was used for this observation. These observations were conducted by the astronomer Louis Lagrange.

In 1789 Jean-Louis Pons began work at Marseille Observatory as a doorkeeper, but he also received lessons in astronomy; by 1801 he had discovered his first comet. Pons would become one of the most prolific comet discovers, finding 37 in all, a significant portion of all comet discoveries for a quarter of a century.

== 19th century ==
Astronomer Jean-Félix Adolphe Gambart discovered 16 comets from the old observatory. Another astronomer of Marseilles Observatory was Benjamin Valz.

Jean-Louis Pons (1761-1831) discovered his first comet in 1801, and went on to find 37 more in his career many of them at Marseilles Observatory.

The Comet Pons-Brook was discovered by Pons in July 1812, however it was not seen again until June 1883. (The next time it was recovered was in 1953.) Some other famous comets discovered by Pons include 7P/Pons–Winnecke, 12P/Pons–Brooks, and 273P/Pons–Gambart, among many others. (see also Comet Pons)

Pons also discovered comets that came to be known by other names including Encke's Comet, Comet Crommelin, and Biela's Comet. This is not unusual as comet discoveries are sometimes later determined to be re-discoveries of previously observed comets or co-discoveries (discovered at the same time by others). Similarly, some comets were named for the first person to compute the comet's orbit, as in the case of Halley's Comet.

In 1863 Marseilles Observatory became a branch of the Paris Observatory. This led to a new building inaugurated by 1864, designed by the architect of Notre Dame de la Garde, also the 80 cm reflector built by Foucault was installed by that year (at the Palais Longchamp site).

Foucault operated his 80 cm silver-on-glass reflector at Marseille Observatory, a telescope with aperture 80 cm (31.5 inches) from about 1862 to its retirement in 1965. The telescope was noted for being a pioneering design, that used silver-coated glass in a reflecting telescope.

Work continued on improvements and by 1866 a Comet Seeker telescope of 18 cm aperture by Martin had been installed, and a 25.8 cm (10.25") aperture refractor by Merz by 1872. The Merz refractor was on equatorial mounting with governor done by Foucault.

There was also instruments and facilities for magnetic studies.

1872 Marseilles reported several new nebula discovered using the Eichens searcher.

In 1873 Marseilles Observatory announced the discovery of 300 new nebula. Of these 75 had their positions accurately cataloged, which was done by comparing the location of the nebula with previously cataloged stars of known position.

In 1873 Marseilles Observatory detached from the Paris Observatory.

In 1874 the Comet C/1874 H1 was discovered from the observatory.

== 20th century ==
In 1914, the Orion nebula was observed with the Perot-Fabry interferometer.

In 1965 the Foucault 80 cm reflecting telescope was retired.

In 1989 the Marseille telescope was completed at the observatory, and then sent to the southern hemisphere later that year. The telescope is a reflecting telescope with 36 cm (~14.2") diameter mirror with a low-expansion glass-ceramic of the Richey-Chrétien type.

Starting in 1990 Marseille Observatory had a study of H alpha (H-alpha (Hα)) in the southern galactic plane. This included observations of the Magellanic Clouds also. This study used the 36 cm Marseille telescope at La Silla observatory in the southern hemisphere for data. The telescope was equipped with both a photon counter and a Fabry-Perot interferometer for this study.

In 1999 Marseilles Observatory published a study on simulating the formation of proto-planets and planetesimals with a large planetary body. This simulation used the GRAPE-4 system.

== 2000s ==
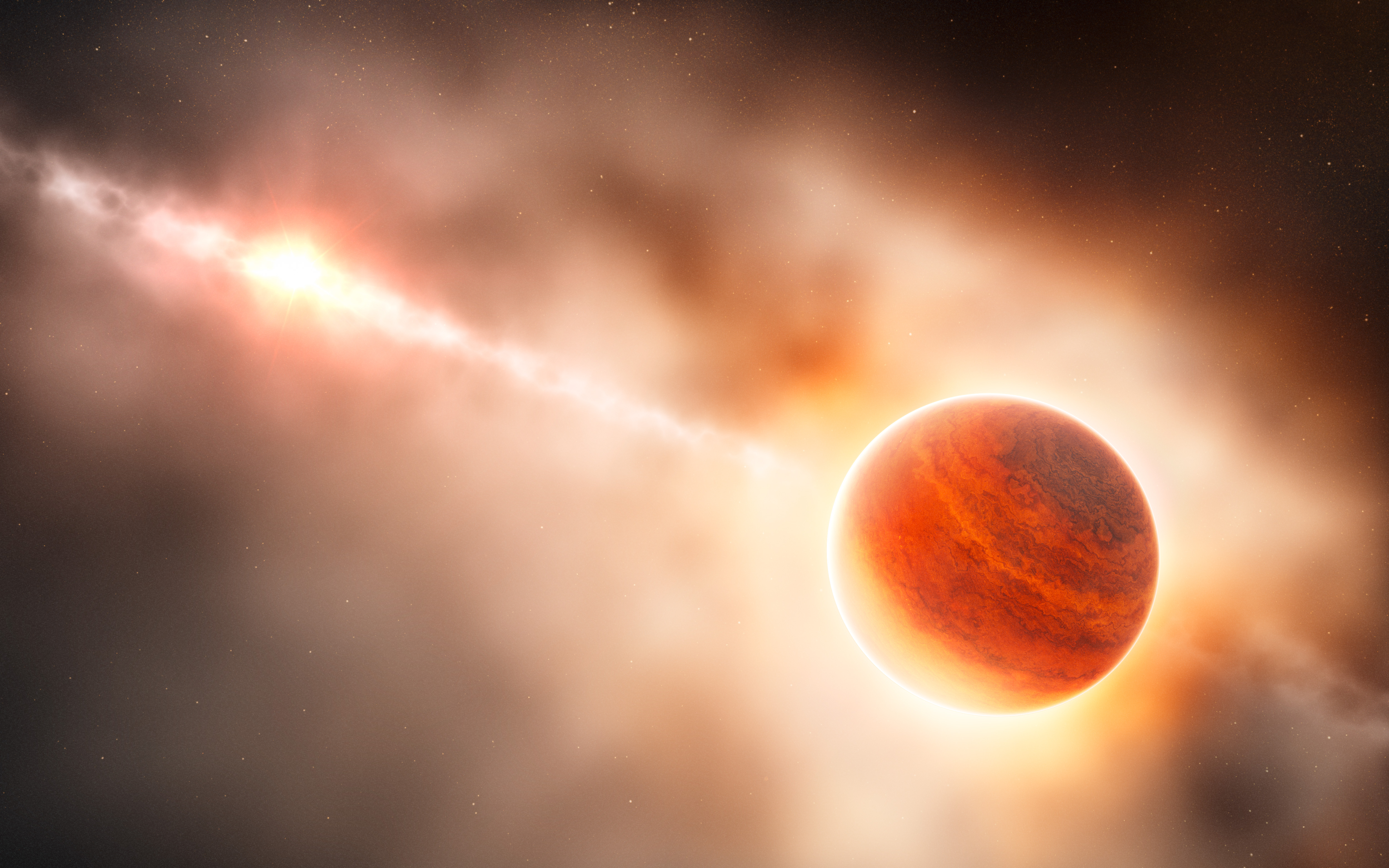
Marseille Observatory use the GRAPE, a gravity simulation software to simulate planetary formation

In 2000, Marseille Observatory merged with the Laboratoire d'Astrophysique Spatiale to become the Laboratoire d'Astrophysique de Marseille (LAM) within the broader Observatoire Astronomique Marseille Provence which also included the Haute-Provence Observatory.

In 2008, LAM was relocated to a new 10,000 square meter facility in the Technopôle Chateau-Gombert in Marseille. The facility includes two major technology platforms for qualification of space instruments and for fabrication and metrology of optical mirrors. LAM astronomers specialize in cosmology and galaxy evolution, exoplanets and Solar System, and R&D in optics and instrumentation.

In 2012, the Observatoire Astronomique Marseille Provence merged with other earth-sciences research institutes from Aix-Marseille University and became a new entity called the Observatoire des Science de l'Univers Institut Pythéas (OSU-IP) which now includes 6 major labs for earth and universe sciences: CEREGE, IMBE, MIO, LAM. LPED, MIO as well as the Haute-Provence Observatory.

== Marseille Observatory Palais Longchamp facilities ==
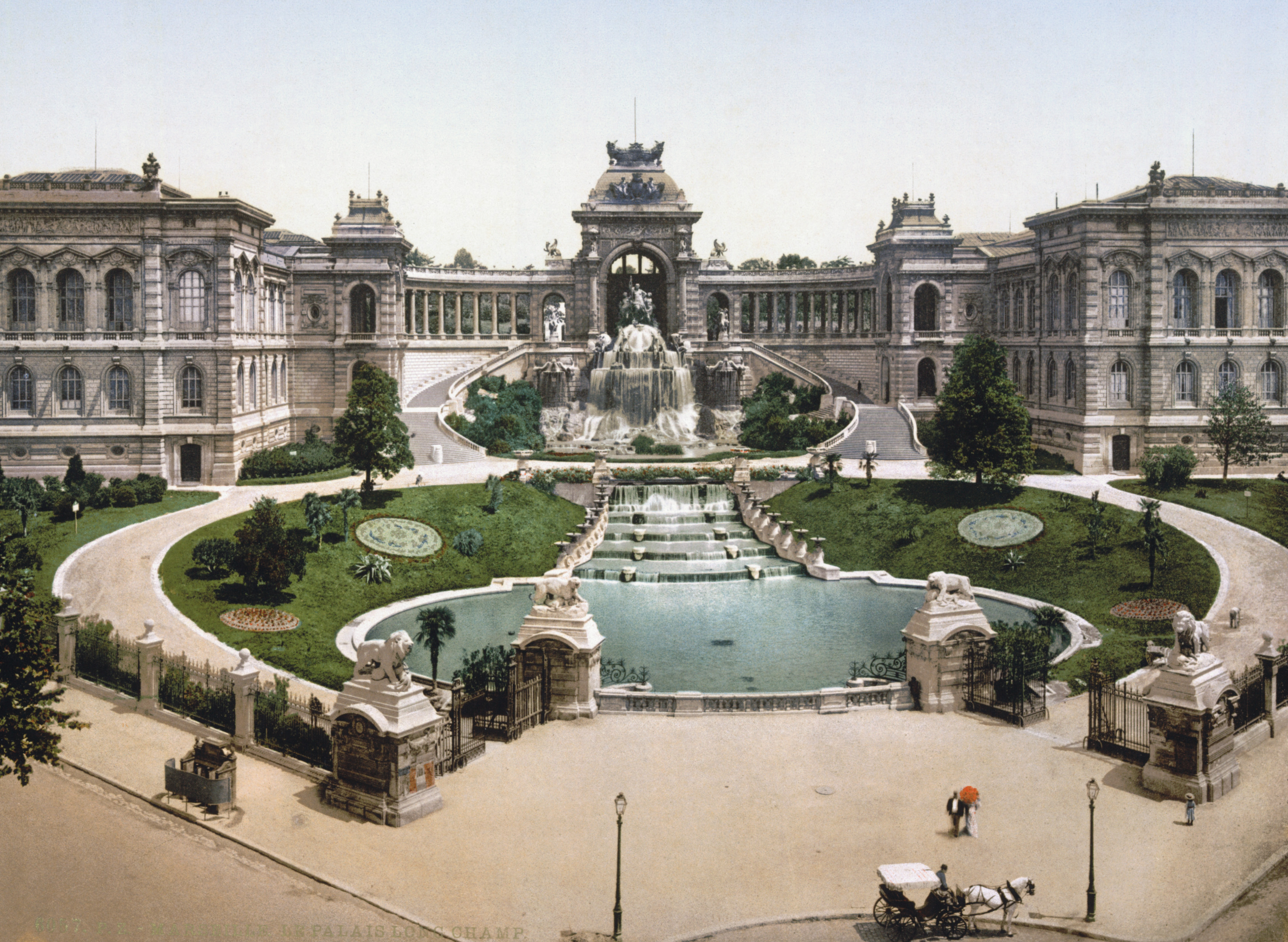
Palais Longchamp in c. 1890-1900

The old Marseille Observatory site is a noted tourist attraction in the Palais Longchamp area. Exhibits include the Foucault telescope, and there is also a planetarium. The planetarium has 30-seats and opened in 2001.

The facilities at Plateau Longchamp date from the 1860s, the older site was at Vieux Port.

== Directors ==
- Antoine Laval, 1702-1728
- Esprit Pézenas, 1729-1763
- Saint-Jacques de Silvabelle, 1763-1801
- Jacques-Joseph Thulis, 1801-1810
- Jean-Jacques Blanpain, 1810-1821
- Jean-Félix Adolphe Gambart, 1821-1836
- Benjamin Valz, 1836-1860
- Charles Simon, known as Darembert, 1861-1863
- Auguste Voigt, 1863-1865
- Édouard Stephan, 1866-1907
- Henry Bourget, 1907-1921
- Henri Buisson, (directeur intérimaire) 1921-1923
- Jean Bosler, 1923-1948
- Charles Fehrenbach, 1948-1971
- James Lequeux, 1983-1988;
- Roger Malina, 2008-

== See also ==
- List of astronomical observatories
- List of largest optical telescopes of the 19th century
