= Antoine Mérindol =

French doctor

- Born: 20 October 1570; Aix-en-Provence
- Died: 26 December 1624 (aged 54)
- Occupation: Doctor
- Children: Jean Mérindol

Antoine Mérindol (1570-1624) was a French doctor.

== Biography ==
He was born on 20 October 1570 in Aix-en-Provence.

In 1616, he became doctor to Louis XIII, who served as King of France from 1610 to 1643. He also taught at Aix-Marseille University. He wrote articles about the medical benefits of taking baths with hot springs from Aix.

He had a son, Jean Mérindol. He died on 26 December 1624.

== Legacy ==
The Rue Mérindol in Aix-en-Provence was named in his honor in 1894, having formerly been named Rue des Baux for Gilles des Baux.

== Bibliography ==
- Apologie pour les Bains d'Aix (Aix-en-Provence: Jean Courraud, 1600).
