= Meanings of minor-planet names: 1–1000 =

As minor planet discoveries are confirmed, they are given a permanent number by the IAU's Minor Planet Center (MPC), and the discoverers can then submit names for them, following the IAU's naming conventions. The list below concerns those minor planets in the specified number-range that have received names, and explains the meanings of those names.

Official naming citations of newly named small Solar System bodies are approved and published in a bulletin by IAU's Working Group for Small Bodies Nomenclature (WGSBN). Before May 2021, citations were published in MPC's Minor Planet Circulars for many decades. Recent citations can also be found on the JPL Small-Body Database (SBDB). Until his death in 2016, German astronomer Lutz D. Schmadel compiled these citations into the Dictionary of Minor Planet Names (DMP) and regularly updated the collection.

Based on Paul Herget's The Names of the Minor Planets, Schmadel also researched the unclear origin of numerous asteroids, most of which had been named prior to World War II. This article incorporates text from this source, which is in the public domain: SBDB New namings may only be added to this list below after official publication as the preannouncement of names is condemned. The WGSBN publishes a comprehensive guideline for the naming rules of non-cometary small Solar System bodies.

== 1–100 ==
Named minor planet	Provisional	This minor planet was named for...	Ref · Catalog
1 Ceres	–	Ceres, Roman goddess of agriculture, grain crops, fertility and motherly relationships	DMP · 1
2 Pallas	–	Athena (Pallas), Greek goddess of wisdom, handicraft, and warfare	DMP · 2
3 Juno	–	Juno, Roman goddess of marriage and childbirth	DMP · 3
4 Vesta	–	Vesta, Roman goddess of the hearth, home, and family	DMP · 4
5 Astraea	–	Astraea, Greek virgin goddess of justice, innocence, purity and precision	DMP · 5
6 Hebe	–	Hebe, Greek goddess of eternal youth, prime of life, and forgiveness. Cupbearer to the gods.	DMP · 6
7 Iris	–	Iris, Greek goddess of the rainbow and messenger of the gods	DMP · 7
8 Flora	–	Flora, Roman goddess of flowers, gardens and spring	DMP · 8
9 Metis	–	Metis, an Oceanid from Greek mythology, one of the many daughters of the Titans Oceanus and Tethys.	DMP · 9
10 Hygiea	–	Hygieia, Greek goddess of health, one of the daughters of Asclepius, god of medicine	DMP · 10
11 Parthenope	–	Parthenope, one of the Sirens in Greek mythology	DMP · 11
12 Victoria	–	Victoria, Roman goddess of victory, daughter of Pallas and Styx	DMP · 12
13 Egeria	–	Egeria, minor Roman goddess and nymph, wife of Numa Pompilius, second king of Rome	DMP · 13
14 Irene	–	Eirene, Greek goddess of peace, daughter of Zeus and Themis	DMP · 14
15 Eunomia	–	Eunomia, minor Greek goddess of law and legislation, daughter of Zeus and Themis	DMP · 15
16 Psyche	–	Psyche, Greek nymph and wife of Cupid, god of erotic love and affection	DMP · 16
17 Thetis	–	Thetis, a Nereid (sea nymph) from Greek mythology, one of the 50 daughters of Nereus and Doris. She is the mother of Achilles.	DMP · 17
18 Melpomene	–	Melpomene, the Muse of tragedy in Greek mythology. The nine Muses are the inspirational goddesses of literature, science, and the arts. They are the daughters of Zeus and Mnemosyne.	DMP · 18
19 Fortuna	–	Fortuna, Roman goddess of chance, luck and fate	DMP · 19
20 Massalia	–	The city of Marseilles (by its Latin name) in south-western France	DMP · 20
21 Lutetia	–	The city of Paris, capital of France, named by its Latin name, Lutetia.	DMP · 21
22 Kalliope	–	Calliope, the Muse of epic, heroic poetry in Greek mythology. The nine Muses are the inspirational goddesses of literature, science, and the arts. They are the daughters of Zeus and Mnemosyne.	DMP · 22
23 Thalia	–	Thalia, the Muse of comedy in Greek mythology. The nine Muses are the inspirational goddesses of literature, science, and the arts. They are the daughters of Zeus and Mnemosyne.	DMP · 23
24 Themis	–	Themis, goddess of law in Greek mythology. She is one of the 12 first-generation Titans, the children of Uranus (Father Sky) and Gaea (Mother Earth).	DMP · 24
25 Phocaea	–	The ancient city of Phocaea, located on the western coast of Anatolia (Asia minor). The Greek settlers from Phocaea founded the colony of modern-day Marseille, France, where this asteroid was discovered at the Marseilles Observatory.	DMP · 25
26 Proserpina	–	Proserpina, Roman goddess of fertility, wine, agriculture. She is the daughter of Ceres and Jupiter, and was abducted by Pluto into the underworld.	DMP · 26
27 Euterpe	–	Euterpe, the Muse of music and lyric poetry in Greek mythology. The nine Muses are the inspirational goddesses of literature, science, and the arts. They are the daughters of Zeus and Mnemosyne.	DMP · 27
28 Bellona	–	Bellona, Roman goddess of war. The daughter of Jupiter and Juno is the consort and sister of Mars.	DMP · 28
29 Amphitrite	–	Amphitrite, sea goddess and wife of Poseidon in Greek mythology. The queen of the sea is either an Oceanid, one of the many daughters of the Titans Oceanus and Tethys or a Nereid (a daughters of the Nereus and Doris).	DMP · 29
30 Urania	–	Urania, the Muse of astronomy in Greek mythology. The nine Muses are the inspirational goddesses of literature, science, and the arts. They are the daughters of Zeus and Mnemosyne.	DMP · 30
31 Euphrosyne	–	Euphrosyne, one of the three Charites (Graces) in Greek mythology. Charites are the daughters of Zeus and Eurynome, an Oceanid (sea nymph). Her other two sisters are Thalia and Aglaea (Aglaja).	DMP · 31
32 Pomona	–	Pomona, Roman goddess of fruit trees, gardens, and orchards. She is the wife of Vertumnus god of seasons, change and plant growth.	DMP · 32
33 Polyhymnia	–	Polyhymnia, the Muse of singing of hymns and rhetoric in Greek mythology. The nine Muses are the inspirational goddesses of literature, science, and the arts. They are the daughters of Zeus and Mnemosyne.	DMP · 33
34 Circe	–	Circe, goddess of magic in Greek mythology. The enchantress tried to influence Odysseus and changed his companions into pigs.	DMP · 34
35 Leukothea	–	Leukothea, daughter of king Cadmus and Harmonia, the goddess of harmony and concord in Greek mythology. Leukothea later became the goddess of the sea and is also known as Ino.	DMP · 35
36 Atalante	–	Atalanta, mythological Greek heroine, who would only marry the man defeating her in a footrace, while those who lost were killed. Hippomenes won the race against her with the help of three sacred apples he received from Aphrodite.	DMP · 36
37 Fides	–	Fides, the Roman goddess of faith, oaths and honesty	DMP · 37
38 Leda	–	Leda, queen of Sparta and mother of Helen of Troy in Greek mythology. She was seduced by Zeus in the guise of a swan (also see Leda and the Swan).	DMP · 38
39 Laetitia	–	Laetitia, Roman goddess of gaiety	DMP · 39
40 Harmonia	–	Harmonia, Greek goddess of harmony and concord. She is the daughter of Ares (god of war) and Aphrodite (goddess of love).	DMP · 40
41 Daphne	–	Daphne, a fresh water nymph (Naiad) in Greek mythology	DMP · 41
42 Isis	–	Isis, the Egyptian goddess who help the dead enter the afterlife. The name also alludes to Isis Pogson (1852–1945), British astronomer and meteorologist and daughter of the discoverer, Norman Pogson.	DMP · 42
43 Ariadne	–	Ariadne, Cretan princess and daughter of king Minos from Greek mythology, who sent every seven years 14 young noble citizens to the labyrinth, to be eaten by the Minotaur. Ariadne fell in love with Theseus and helped him to find his way out of the Minotaur's labyrinth.	DMP · 43
44 Nysa	–	Nysa, nymph and daughter of Aristaeus who raised the infant god Dionysus (also known as Bacchus).	· 44
45 Eugenia	–	Eugénie de Montijo (1826–1920), Empress of France and mother of Napoleon Eugene, Prince Imperial, after whom Antoine de Saint-Exupéry's character The Little Prince is based. (The asteroid's companion is named Petit-Prince)	DMP · 45
46 Hestia	–	Hestia, Greek goddess of the hearth, home, and family. She is the daughter of the Titans Cronus and Rhea. Alternatively, she is one of the seven Hesperides, nymph daughters of the Titans Atlas and Hesperis.	DMP · 46
47 Aglaja	–	Aglaea (Aglaja), one of the three Charites (Graces) in Greek mythology. Charites are the daughters of Zeus and Eurynome, an Oceanid (sea nymph). Her other two sisters are Thalia and Euphrosyne.	DMP · 47
48 Doris	–	Doris, an Oceanid from Greek mythology, one of the many daughters of the Titans Oceanus and Tethys. Doris and her brother Nereus are the parents of Nerites and 50 Nereids (also sea nymphs).	DMP · 48
49 Pales	–	Pales, Roman goddess of shepherds, flocks and livestock	DMP · 49
50 Virginia	–	The ancient Roman story of Verginia (Virginia), a girl stabbed by her father in order to save her from Appius Claudius Crassus in 448 B.C. It is also an allusion to U.S. state of Virginia.	DMP · 50
51 Nemausa	–	The city of Nîmes in southern France (by its Latin name "Nemausa")	DMP · 51
52 Europa	–	Europa, mythological Greek princess, abducted by Zeus in the form of a bull and gave birth to Minos, the first king of Crete.	DMP · 52
53 Kalypso	–	Calypso, an Oceanid from Greek mythology, one of the many daughters of the Titans Oceanus and Tethys. Calypso kept Odysseus prisoner at Ogygia for seven years.	DMP · 53
54 Alexandra	–	Alexander von Humboldt (1769–1859), German explorer	DMP · 54
55 Pandora	–	Pandora, the first human woman in Greek mythology. She was created from clay by Hephaestus at the request of Zeus.	DMP · 55
56 Melete	–	Melete, one of the three original muses before the Nine Olympian Muses were founded. Her sisters were Aoide and Mneme.	DMP · 56
57 Mnemosyne	–	Mnemosyne, the goddess of memory in Greek mythology. She is the mother of the nine Muses with Zeus, and one of the 12 first-generation Titans, the children of Uranus (Father Sky) and Gaea (Mother Earth).	DMP · 57
58 Concordia	–	Concordia, the Roman goddess of peace and concord. She is the daughter of Jupiter and Themis.	DMP · 58
59 Elpis	–	Elpis, the personification and spirit of hope in Greek mythology. In the 1860s, there was a dispute about a new nomenclature proposed by Urbain Le Verrier who wanted to name this asteroid after its discoverer, Jean Chacornac (1823–1873). This was rejected by the community of astronomers. The asteroid was then named by Karl L. Littrow on a request by Edmund Weiss since Chacornac refused to submit a name (other than his own). The given name is an allusion to the "hope" that this dispute could be settled.	DMP · 59
60 Echo	–	Echo, an Oread (mountain nymph) in Greek mythology, who, as a punishment, was only able to speak the last words spoken to her. When she fell in love with Narcissus, she was unable to tell him how she felt; and was forced to watch him as he fell in love with himself.	DMP · 60
61 Danaë	–	Danaë, daughter of king Acrisius and mother of hero Perseus by Zeus in Greek mythology. Danaë was confined in a brass tower by her father to keep her a virgin. Zeus however, desired her, and came to her in the form of golden rain which streamed in through the roof of her confinement and down into her womb.	DMP · 61
62 Erato	–	Erato, the Muse of love poetry in Greek mythology. The nine Muses are the inspirational goddesses of literature, science, and the arts. They are the daughters of Zeus and Mnemosyne.	DMP · 62
63 Ausonia	–	The country of Italy, by its ancient Greek name for lower Italy, derived from king Auson, a son of Odysseus and Kallisto. The term "Ausones" was also applied by Greek writers to describe various Italic peoples.	DMP · 63
64 Angelina	–	Astronomical station of Hungarian astronomer Franz Xaver von Zach (1754–1832), near Marseilles in France	DMP · 64
65 Cybele	–	Cybele, mother goddess worshiped as "Mountain Mother" by the Phrygias, and adopted as "Great Mother" by the Greeks and Romans. This asteroid was originally named "Maximiliana", after Maximilian II, king of Bavaria. This non-classical name, however, was rejected by several astronomers, also see (59).	DMP · 65
66 Maja	–	Maia, one of the Pleiades, the seven daughters of Titan Atlas and Oceanid nymph Pleione. Maia is the mother of the Olympian messenger god Hermes.	DMP · 66
67 Asia	–	Asia, an Oceanid from Greek mythology, one of the many daughters of the Titans Oceanus and Tethys. This was the first asteroid discovered in Asia. English astronomer N. R. Pogson discovered it at Madras Observatory, India, in April 1861.	DMP · 67
68 Leto	–	Leto, goddess of motherhood in Greek mythology. She is the daughter of the Titans Coeus and Phoebe and the mother of Olympian god Apollo and goddess Artemis.	DMP · 68
69 Hesperia	–	The country of Italy (by its Greek name Hesperia; "setting Sun" or "evening"). This asteroid was discovered one month after the Italian unification was proclaimed on 17 March 1861.	DMP · 69
70 Panopaea	–	Panopaea, a Nereid (sea nymph) from Greek mythology, one of the 50 daughters of Nereus and Doris. She was invoked by sailors during storms.	DMP · 70
71 Niobe	–	Niobe, daughter of king Tantalus in Greek mythology. The gods punished her by killing her seven sons and seven daughters and changing her into a rock.	DMP · 71
72 Feronia	–	Feronia, Roman goddess of groves, wildlife and freedmen.	DMP · 72
73 Klytia	–	Clytie, an Oceanid from Greek mythology, one of the many daughters of the Titans Oceanus and Tethys	DMP · 73
74 Galatea	–	Galatea, a Nereid (sea nymph) from Greek mythology, one of the 50 daughters of Nereus and Doris, who loved the shepherd Acis. Alternatively, the name may refer to the statue of a woman created by sculptor Pygmalion.	DMP · 74
75 Eurydike	–	Eurydice, an oak nymph and daughter of Apollo in Greek mythology. She was the wife of Orpheus, who failed to bring her back from the dead. With his enchanting music he softened the hearts of the gods who let him descend into the underworld under the condition that he must not look at her until both had reached the upper world.	DMP · 75
76 Freia	–	Freyja, the goddess of love and beauty in Norse mythology.	DMP · 76
77 Frigga	–	Frigg, wife of Odin and queen of all the gods in Norse mythology.	DMP · 77
78 Diana	–	Diana, goddess of the hunt in Roman mythology. She is the daughter of Jupiter and Latona. Her Greek counterpart is Artemis.	DMP · 78
79 Eurynome	–	Eurynome, an Oceanid from Greek mythology, one of the many daughters of the Titans Oceanus and Tethys.	DMP · 79
80 Sappho	–	Sappho (c. 630 – c. 570 BC), Greek poet who, according to mythology, killed herself by jumping off the cliffs for love of the ferryman Phaon.	DMP · 80
81 Terpsichore	–	Terpsichore, the Muse of dance and chorus in Greek mythology. The nine Muses are the inspirational goddesses of literature, science, and the arts. They are the daughters of Zeus and Mnemosyne.	DMP · 81
82 Alkmene	–	Alcmene, mother of the divine hero Heracles in Greek mythology. Zeus slept with Alcmene disguised as her husband Amphitryon.	DMP · 82
83 Beatrix	–	Beatrice Portinari (1265–1290), beloved of Italian poet Dante Alighieri.	DMP · 83
84 Klio	–	Clio, the Muse of history in Greek mythology. The nine Muses are the inspirational goddesses of literature, science, and the arts. They are the daughters of Zeus and Mnemosyne.	DMP · 84
85 Io	–	Io, daughter of Inachus, king of Argos, and one of the mortal lovers of Zeus in Greek mythology.	DMP · 85
86 Semele	–	Semele, the youngest daughter of king Cadmus and the mother of Dionysus by Zeus in Greek mythology.	DMP · 86
87 Sylvia	–	Rhea Sylvia, the mythical mother of the twins Romulus and Remus from Roman mythology (Src). Alternatively, it was named after Sylvie Petiaux-Hugo Flammarion, first wife of French astronomer Camille Flammarion (1842–1925)	DMP · 87
88 Thisbe	–	Thisbe, lover of Pyramus in Classical mythology. The two Babylonian lovers are also prominent in the comedy A Midsummer Night's Dream by Shakespeare.	DMP · 88
89 Julia	–	Julia of Corsica (c. died 439), a virgin martyr who is venerated as a Christian saint.	DMP · 89
90 Antiope	–	Antiope, an Amazon and daughter of Ares in Greek mythology. Alternatively, she was the daughter of Nycteus, king of Thebes, and the lover of Zeus. This minor planet is likely the first double asteroid ever discovered.	DMP · 90
91 Aegina	–	Aegina, daughter of the river-god Asopus and the river-nymph Metope. She was changed into the island of Aegina by Zeus.	DMP · 91
92 Undina	–	Heroine of the fairy-tale novella Undine by German writer Friedrich de la Motte Fouqué (1777–1843)	DMP · 92
93 Minerva	–	Minerva, goddess of wisdom and strategic warfare and daughter of Jupiter and Metis in Roman mythology. Her Greek equivalent is Athena.	DMP · 93
94 Aurora	–	Aurora, goddess of the dawn in Roman mythology. Her Greek counterpart is Eos, who is the daughter of the Titans Hyperion and Theia.	DMP · 94
95 Arethusa	–	Arethusa, one of the seven Hesperides, nymph daughters of the Titans Atlas and Hesperis	DMP · 95
96 Aegle	–	Aegle, one of the seven Hesperides, nymph daughters of the Titans Atlas and Hesperis	DMP · 96
97 Klotho	–	Clotho (Klotho), one of the Three Fates or Moirai who spin (Clotho), draw out (Lachesis) and cut (Atropos) the thread of Life in ancient Greek mythology.	DMP · 97
98 Ianthe	–	Ianthe, a girl who married Iphis after Isis turned Iphis from a woman into a man. Alternatively, she was an Oceanid from Greek mythology, one of the many daughters of the Titans Oceanus and Tethys.	DMP · 98
99 Dike	–	Dike, minor Greek goddess of human justice and the spirit of moral order, daughter of Zeus and Themis.	DMP · 99
100 Hekate	–	Hecate, Greek goddess of magic and transitions. The name "Hecate" also sounds like Greek hekaton meaning "one hundred".	DMP · 100

== 101–200 ==
back to top

Named minor planet	Provisional	This minor planet was named for...	Ref · Catalog
101 Helena	–	Helen of Troy, the most beautiful woman in the world in Greek mythology. The wife of king Menelaus of Sparta was abducted by Paris which led to the Trojan War.	DMP · 101
102 Miriam	–	Miriam, Biblical prophetess.	DMP · 102
103 Hera	–	Hera, Greek goddess of marriage, childbirth, and family. She is the daughter of the Titans Cronus and Rhea, and sister and wife of Zeus.	DMP · 103
104 Klymene	–	One of various Greek figures named Clymene.	DMP · 104
105 Artemis	–	Artemis, Greek goddess of the hunt, forests, and the Moon. She was the daughter of Zeus by Leto and twin sister of Apollo. Her Roman equivalent is Diana.	DMP · 105
106 Dione	–	Dione, an Oceanid from Greek mythology, one of the many daughters of the Titans Oceanus and Tethys. She was one of the wives of Zeus and mother of Aphrodite, the goddess of love, beauty and sexuality.	DMP · 106
107 Camilla	–	Camilla, queen of the Volsci from Roman mythology. Less likely, the name refers to French astronomer Camille Flammarion (1842–1925).	DMP · 107
108 Hecuba	–	Hecuba, wife of King Priam during the Trojan War in Greek mythology	DMP · 108
109 Felicitas	–	Felicitas, goddess of happiness in Roman mythology. She is often portrayed holding a caduceus (staff) and a cornucopia (horn of plenty).	DMP · 109
110 Lydia	–	Lydia, ancient region of Asia Minor	DMP · 110
111 Ate	–	Atë, goddess of mischief, delusion, ruin, and folly in Greek mythology. She is the daughter of Zeus or of Eris.	DMP · 111
112 Iphigenia	–	Iphigenia, mythological Greek princess	DMP · 112
113 Amalthea	–	Amalthea, mythological Greek nursemaid	DMP · 113
114 Kassandra	–	Cassandra, mythological Trojan prophetess	DMP · 114
115 Thyra	–	Thyra, wife of King Gorm of Denmark	DMP · 115
116 Sirona	–	Sirona, Celtic goddess	DMP · 116
117 Lomia	–	Misspelling of Lamia queen of Libya, lover of Zeus	DMP · 117
118 Peitho	–	Peitho, Greek goddess	DMP · 118
119 Althaea	–	Althaea, Greek mother of Meleager	DMP · 119
120 Lachesis	–	Lachesis, one of the Three Fates or Moirai who spin (Clotho), draw out (Lachesis) and cut (Atropos) the thread of Life in ancient Greek mythology.	DMP · 120
121 Hermione	–	Hermione, mythological Greek princess	DMP · 121
122 Gerda	–	Gerðr, Norse goddess	DMP · 122
123 Brunhild	–	Brünnehilde, Norse Valkyrie	DMP · 123
124 Alkeste	–	Alcestis, mythological Greek woman	DMP · 124
125 Liberatrix	–	Possibly Adolphe Thiers (1797–1877), French president during the Franco-Prussian War. Also possibly Joan of Arc.	DMP · 125
126 Velleda	–	Veleda, Germanic priestess, leader of Batavian uprising against the Romans	DMP · 126
127 Johanna	–	Joan of Arc (1412–1431), saint and heroine of France	DMP · 127
128 Nemesis	–	Nemesis, Greek goddess	DMP · 128
129 Antigone	–	Antigone, mythological Greek princess	DMP · 129
130 Elektra	–	Electra, mythological Greek princess	DMP · 130
131 Vala	–	Völva, mythological Norse prophetess	DMP · 131
132 Aethra	–	Aethra, Greek mother of Theseus	DMP · 132
133 Cyrene	–	Cyrene, Greek lover of Apollo	DMP · 133
134 Sophrosyne	–	Sophrosyne, Plato's concept of moderation	DMP · 134
135 Hertha	–	Nerthus (Hertha), Norse goddess, also see (601) Nerthus	DMP · 135
136 Austria	–	Austria, country	DMP · 136
137 Meliboea	–	Meliboea, various Greek figures	DMP · 137
138 Tolosa	–	Latin for Toulouse, France	DMP · 138
139 Juewa	–	Chinese for 'Star of China's Fortune'	DMP · 139
140 Siwa	–	Siwa, Slavic goddess	DMP · 140
141 Lumen	–	Lumen : Récits de l'infini, book by Camille Flammarion (1842–1925)	DMP · 141
142 Polana	–	Pula, city now in Croatia	DMP · 142
143 Adria	–	Adriatic Sea	DMP · 143
144 Vibilia	–	Vibilia, Roman goddess and patroness of journeyings	DMP · 144
145 Adeona	–	Adeona, Roman goddess and patroness of homecomings	DMP · 145
146 Lucina	–	Lucina, Roman goddess	DMP · 146
147 Protogeneia	–	Protogeneia, mythological Greek princess	DMP · 147
148 Gallia	–	Gaul, Roman province	DMP · 148
149 Medusa	–	Medusa, mythological Greek monster	DMP · 149
150 Nuwa	–	Nüwa, Chinese mythological figure	DMP · 150
151 Abundantia	–	Abundantia, Roman goddess	DMP · 151
152 Atala	–	Atala, eponymous hero of novel by François-René de Chateaubriand	DMP · 152
153 Hilda	–	Daughter of Austrian astronomer Theodor von Oppolzer (1841–1886)	DMP · 153
154 Bertha	–	Berthe Martin-Flammarion, sister of French astronomer Camille Flammarion (1842–1925)	DMP · 154
155 Scylla	–	Scylla, Greek mythological monster	DMP · 155
156 Xanthippe	–	Xanthippe, wife of Socrates	DMP · 156
157 Dejanira	–	Deianira, mythological Greek princess	DMP · 157
158 Koronis	–	Coronis, various Greek figures	DMP · 158
159 Aemilia	–	Via Aemilia, Roman road	DMP · 159
160 Una	–	Una, character in Edmund Spenser's The Faerie Queene	DMP · 160
161 Athor	–	Hathor, Egyptian goddess	DMP · 161
162 Laurentia	–	Joseph Jean Pierre Laurent (died 1900), French amateur astronomer	DMP · 162
163 Erigone	–	Erigone, various Greek figures	DMP · 163
164 Eva	–	unknown origin of name; it may refer to Eve.	DMP · 164
165 Loreley	–	The Lorelei, character in German folklore	DMP · 165
166 Rhodope	–	Queen Rhodope, Greek mythology	DMP · 166
167 Urda	–	Urd, Norse Norn	DMP · 167
168 Sibylla	–	The Sibyls, Greek prophetesses	DMP · 168
169 Zelia	–	Niece of French astronomer Camille Flammarion (1842–1925)	DMP · 169
170 Maria	–	Maria, sister of Italian astronomer Antonio Abetti (1846–1928)	DMP · 170
171 Ophelia	–	Ophelia, character in Shakespeare's Hamlet	DMP · 171
172 Baucis	–	Baucis, Greek mythological woman	DMP · 172
173 Ino	–	Ino, mythological Greek woman	DMP · 173
174 Phaedra	–	Phaedra, Greek mythological woman	DMP · 174
175 Andromache	–	Andromache, Trojan wife of Hector	DMP · 175
176 Iduna	–	Ydun, a club that hosted an astronomical conference in Stockholm, Sweden (the club was probably named after Iduna, a Norse goddess)	DMP · 176
177 Irma	–	unknown origin of name	DMP · 177
178 Belisana	–	Belisana, Celtic goddess	DMP · 178
179 Klytaemnestra	–	Clytemnestra, Greek mythological queen	DMP · 179
180 Garumna	–	Ancient name for river Garonne, France	DMP · 180
181 Eucharis	–	Eucharis, Greek nymph	DMP · 181
182 Elsa	–	Elsbeth – the Austrian variant of "Elisabeth" a common female first name – and only later changed into a more lyrical "Elsa" with the consent of the discoverer, Johann Palisa. It may also refer to the Empress Elisabeth of Austria (1854–1898), or other person or characters.	DMP · 182
183 Istria	–	Istria, peninsula in Croatia and Slovenia	DMP · 183
184 Dejopeja	–	Deiopaea, Roman nymph	DMP · 184
185 Eunike	–	Eunice (Eunike), a Nereid (sea nymph) from Greek mythology, one of the 50 daughters of Nereus and Doris, whose name means "happy victory". It was chosen to commemorate the Treaty of San Stefano, which was signed two days after the discovery of this asteroid by C. H. F. Peters in March 1878.	DMP · 185
186 Celuta	–	Celuta, the main character in the short novella René by French author François-René de Chateaubriand (1768–1848)	DMP · 186
187 Lamberta	–	Johann Heinrich Lambert (1728–1777), Swiss polymath	DMP · 187
188 Menippe	–	Menippe, Greek daughter of Orion	DMP · 188
189 Phthia	–	Phthia, various Greek figures and places	DMP · 189
190 Ismene	–	Ismene, Greek daughter of Oedipus	DMP · 190
191 Kolga	–	Kólga, daughter of Ægir in Norse mythology	DMP · 191
192 Nausikaa	–	Nausicaa, mythological Greek princess	DMP · 192
193 Ambrosia	–	Ambrosia, Greek food of the gods	DMP · 193
194 Prokne	–	Procne, sister of Philomela in Greek mythology	DMP · 194
195 Eurykleia	–	Eurycleia, Greek nurse of Odysseus	DMP · 195
196 Philomela	–	Philomela, sister of Procne in Greek mythology	DMP · 196
197 Arete	–	Arete, Greek mother of Nausicaa	DMP · 197
198 Ampella	–	Ampelos, Greek friend of Dionysus	DMP · 198
199 Byblis	–	Byblis, Greek mythological woman	DMP · 199
200 Dynamene	–	Dynamene, a Nereid (sea nymph) from Greek mythology, one of the 50 daughters of Nereus and Doris.	DMP · 200

== 201–300 ==
back to top

Named minor planet	Provisional	This minor planet was named for...	Ref · Catalog
201 Penelope	–	Penelope, Greek wife of Odysseus	DMP · 201
202 Chryseïs	–	Chryseis, mythological Trojan woman	DMP · 202
203 Pompeja	–	Pompeii, ruined Roman town	DMP · 203
204 Kallisto	–	Callisto, Greek nymph	DMP · 204
205 Martha	–	Martha, woman in the New Testament	DMP · 205
206 Hersilia	–	Hersilia, Roman wife of Romulus	DMP · 206
207 Hedda	–	Hedwig, wife of German astronomer Friedrich August Theodor Winnecke (1835–1897)	DMP · 207
208 Lacrimosa	–	Our Lady of Sorrows, a title referring to Mary, the mother of Jesus	DMP · 208
209 Dido	–	Dido, mythological Carthaginian queen	DMP · 209
210 Isabella	–	Unknown origin of name	DMP · 210
211 Isolda	–	Isolde, heroine of the legend of Tristan and Iseult	DMP · 211
212 Medea	–	Medea, Greek mythological witch	DMP · 212
213 Lilaea	–	Lilaea, Greek Naiad	DMP · 213
214 Aschera	–	Astarte (Aschera, Astoreth), Sidonian and Phoenician goddess of love and fertility, also see (672)	DMP · 214
215 Oenone	–	Oenone, Greek nymph	DMP · 215
216 Kleopatra	–	Cleopatra (69–30 BC), Queen of Egypt	DMP · 216
217 Eudora	–	Eudora, Greek Hyad	DMP · 217
218 Bianca	–	Bianca Bianchi, stage name of the German opera singer Bertha Schwarz (1855–1947)	DMP · 218
219 Thusnelda	–	Thusnelda, wife of Germanic warrior Arminius	DMP · 219
220 Stephania	–	Princess Stéphanie of Belgium (1864–1945)	DMP · 220
221 Eos	–	Eos, Greek goddess	DMP · 221
222 Lucia	–	Lucia, daughter of Austrian explorer Count Johann Nepomuk Wilczek (1837–1922)	DMP · 222
223 Rosa	–	Unknown origin of name	DMP · 223
224 Oceana	–	The Pacific Ocean	DMP · 224
225 Henrietta	–	Henrietta, wife of French astronomer Pierre Janssen (1824–1907)	DMP · 225
226 Weringia	–	Währing, part of Vienna	DMP · 226
227 Philosophia	–	Philosophy	DMP · 227
228 Agathe	–	Agathe, daughter of Austrian astronomer Theodor von Oppolzer (1841–1886)	DMP · 228
229 Adelinda	–	Adelinde Weiss (née Fenzel), wife of Austrian astronomer Edmund Weiss (1837–1917), director of the Vienna Observatory where this asteroid was discovered by Johann Palisa; also see (265), (266), and (583).	DMP · 229
230 Athamantis	–	Athamantis, Greek daughter of Athamas	DMP · 230
231 Vindobona	–	Latin name for Vienna, Austria	DMP · 231
232 Russia	–	Russia, country	DMP · 232
233 Asterope	–	Sterope, Greek Pleiad	DMP · 233
234 Barbara	–	Saint Barbara	DMP · 234
235 Carolina	–	Caroline Island, now part of Kiribati	DMP · 235
236 Honoria	–	Honoria, Roman goddess	DMP · 236
237 Coelestina	–	Coelestine, wife of Austrian astronomer Theodor von Oppolzer (1841–1886)	DMP · 237
238 Hypatia	–	Hypatia (c. 350–415), Greek philosopher	DMP · 238
239 Adrastea	–	Adrasteia, Greek goddess	DMP · 239
240 Vanadis	–	Vanadis, Norse goddess	DMP · 240
241 Germania	–	Latin name for Germany	DMP · 241
242 Kriemhild	–	Kriemhild, mythological Germanic princess	DMP · 242
243 Ida	–	Ida, Cretan nymph, after whom Mount Ida is named, where the mythical dactyls lived ((243) Ida I Dactyl)	DMP · 243
244 Sita	–	Sita, Hindu wife of Rama	DMP · 244
245 Vera	–	Unknown origin of name. The asteroid's name was suggested by the wife of the discoverer, N. R. Pogson (1829–1891)	DMP · 245
246 Asporina	–	Asporina, goddess worshipped in Asia Minor	DMP · 246
247 Eukrate	–	Eukrate, a Nereid (sea nymph) from Greek mythology, one of the 50 daughters of Nereus and Doris.	DMP · 247
248 Lameia	–	Lamia, lover of Zeus	DMP · 248
249 Ilse	–	Ilse, legendary German princess	DMP · 249
250 Bettina	–	Bettina Caroline de Rothschild (1858–1892), Austrian Baroness and wife of Albert Salomon Anselm von Rothschild, who named the asteroid after her. The discoverer, Johann Palisa, reportedly sold the naming rights for 50 pounds in order to help fund his expedition to observe the total solar eclipse of August 29, 1886.	DMP · 250
251 Sophia	–	Sophia, wife of German astronomer Hugo von Seeliger (1849–1924)	DMP · 251
252 Clementina	–	Unknown origin of name. The asteroid was named by its discoverer, Henri Joseph Anastase Perrotin (1845–1904)	DMP · 252
253 Mathilde	–	Mathilde, wife of French astronomer Maurice Loewy (1833–1907)	DMP · 253
254 Augusta	–	Auguste von Littrow (1819–1890), author, and champion of women's rights; wife of Austrian astronomer Carl Ludwig von Littrow	DMP · 254
255 Oppavia	–	Opava, now Czech Republic	DMP · 255
256 Walpurga	–	Saint Walpurga	DMP · 256
257 Silesia	–	Silesia, region of central Europe	DMP · 257
258 Tyche	–	Tyche, Greek goddess	DMP · 258
259 Aletheia	–	Veritas (Aletheia), Greek goddess	DMP · 259
260 Huberta	–	Saint Hubertus	DMP · 260
261 Prymno	–	Prymno, one of the Oceanids, daughters of the Titans Oceanus and Tethys in Greek mythology	DMP · 261
262 Valda	–	Unknown origin of name. The asteroid's name was proposed by the Baroness Bettina Caroline de Rothschild, see (250)	DMP · 262
263 Dresda	–	The city of Dresden in Germany	DMP · 263
264 Libussa	–	Libussa, legendary founder of Prague	DMP · 264
265 Anna	–	Anny Weiss (née Kretschmar), daughter-in-law of Austrian astronomer Edmund Weiss (1837–1917), director of the Vienna Observatory where this asteroid was discovered by Johann Palisa; also see (229) and (266)	DMP · 265
266 Aline	–	Linda von Schuster (née Weiss), daughter of Austrian astronomer Edmund Weiss (1837–1917), director of the Vienna Observatory where this asteroid was discovered by Johann Palisa; also see (229) and (265)	DMP · 266
267 Tirza	–	Tirzah, Biblical figure	DMP · 267
268 Adorea	–	Adorea, Roman cake	DMP · 268
269 Justitia	–	Justitia or Themis, Greek goddess	DMP · 269
270 Anahita	–	Anahita, Persian goddess	DMP · 270
271 Penthesilea	–	Penthesilea, mythological Amazon queen	DMP · 271
272 Antonia	–	Unknown origin of name	DMP · 272
273 Atropos	–	Atropos, one of the Three Fates or Moirai who spin (Clotho), draw out (Lachesis) and cut (Atropos) the thread of Life in ancient Greek mythology.	DMP · 273
274 Philagoria	–	Philagoria, recreation club in Olomouc	DMP · 274
275 Sapientia	–	Latin for wisdom	DMP · 275
276 Adelheid	–	Unknown origin of name	DMP · 276
277 Elvira	–	Character in books by Alphonse de Lamartine (1790–1869)	DMP · 277
278 Paulina	–	Unknown origin of name	DMP · 278
279 Thule	–	Thule, mythical northern land (usually identified with Scandinavia)	DMP · 279
280 Philia	–	Philia, Greek nymph	DMP · 280
281 Lucretia	–	Caroline Herschel (1750–1848), German astronomer	DMP · 281
282 Clorinde	–	Clorinda, heroine of Torquato Tasso's poem Jerusalem Delivered	DMP · 282
283 Emma	–	Unknown origin of name	DMP · 283
284 Amalia	–	Unknown origin of name	DMP · 284
285 Regina	–	Unknown origin of name	DMP · 285
286 Iclea	–	Icléa, heroine of French astronomer Camille Flammarion's novel Uranie	DMP · 286
287 Nephthys	–	Nephthys, Egyptian goddess	DMP · 287
288 Glauke	–	Glauke, Greek daughter of Creon	DMP · 288
289 Nenetta	–	French slang for a frivolous woman	DMP · 289
290 Bruna	–	Brno, now Czech Republic	DMP · 290
291 Alice	–	Unknown origin of name. The asteroid was named by the French Astronomical Society (French: Société astronomique de France).	DMP · 291
292 Ludovica	–	Unknown origin of name. The asteroid was named by the French Astronomical Society (French: Société astronomique de France).	DMP · 292
293 Brasilia	–	Brazil, country	DMP · 293
294 Felicia	–	Unknown origin of name	DMP · 294
295 Theresia	–	Unknown origin of name. Previously, the name was erroneously attributed to Maria Theresa (1717–1780), Holy Roman Empress and queen of Hungary and Bohemia.	DMP · 295
296 Phaëtusa	–	Phaethusa, Greek goddess	DMP · 296
297 Caecilia	–	Unknown origin of name	DMP · 297
298 Baptistina	–	Unknown origin of name	DMP · 298
299 Thora	–	Thor, god of thunder, weather and storms in Norse mythology	DMP · 299
300 Geraldina	–	Unknown origin of name	DMP · 300

== 301–400 ==
back to top

Named minor planet	Provisional	This minor planet was named for...	Ref · Catalog
301 Bavaria	–	Bavaria, region of Germany	DMP · 301
302 Clarissa	–	Unknown origin of name	DMP · 302
303 Josephina	–	Discoverer Elia Millosevich simply stated "in homage to a person dear to me"	DMP · 303
304 Olga	–	Olga, niece of German astronomer Friedrich Wilhelm Argelander (1799–1875)	DMP · 304
305 Gordonia	–	James Gordon Bennett Jr. (1841–1918), editor of the New York Herald, founded by his father	DMP · 305
306 Unitas	–	Book by Italian astronomer Angelo Secchi (1818–1878); also named for the unity of Italy	DMP · 306
307 Nike	–	Nike, Greek goddess	DMP · 307
308 Polyxo	–	Polyxo, Greek Hyad	DMP · 308
309 Fraternitas	–	Latin for fraternity	DMP · 309
310 Margarita	–	Unknown origin of name	DMP · 310
311 Claudia	–	Unknown origin of name	DMP · 311
312 Pierretta	–	Unknown origin of name	DMP · 312
313 Chaldaea	–	Chaldea, Babylonian nation	DMP · 313
314 Rosalia	–	Unknown origin of name	DMP · 314
315 Constantia	–	Constancy	DMP · 315
316 Goberta	–	Unknown origin of name	DMP · 316
317 Roxane	–	Roxana (c. 340–310 BC), wife of Alexander the Great	DMP · 317
318 Magdalena	–	Unknown origin of name	DMP · 318
319 Leona	–	Unknown origin of name	DMP · 319
320 Katharina	–	Mother of discoverer Johann Palisa (1848–1925)	DMP · 320
321 Florentina	–	Florentine, daughter of the discoverer, Austrian astronomer Johann Palisa	DMP · 321
322 Phaeo	–	Phaeo, Greek Hyad	DMP · 322
323 Brucia	–	Catherine Wolfe Bruce (1816–1900), American patron of astronomy	DMP · 323
324 Bamberga	–	Bamberg, Germany	DMP · 324
325 Heidelberga	–	Heidelberg, Germany	DMP · 325
326 Tamara	–	Tamar of Georgia (c. 1160–1213), queen of Georgia	DMP · 326
327 Columbia	–	Christopher Columbus (1451–1506), an Italian explorer, navigator, who initiated the permanent European colonization of the Americas	DMP · 327
328 Gudrun	–	Gudrun, Norse wife of Sigurd	DMP · 328
329 Svea	–	Sweden	DMP · 329
330 Adalberta	A910 CB	Adalbert Merx (1838–1909), German Protestant theologian and orientalist; father-in-law of the discoverer, Max Wolf	DMP · 330
331 Etheridgea	–	Unknown origin of name	DMP · 331
332 Siri	–	Unknown origin of name	DMP · 332
333 Badenia	1892 A	Baden, region of Germany	DMP · 333
334 Chicago	1892 L	Chicago, United States	DMP · 334
335 Roberta	1892 C	Carl Robert Osten-Sacken (1828–1906), Baltic-German diplomat and entomologist	DMP · 335
336 Lacadiera	1892 D	La Cadière-d'Azur, village in Var, France	DMP · 336
337 Devosa	1892 E	Unknown origin of name	DMP · 337
338 Budrosa	1892 F	Unknown origin of name	DMP · 338
339 Dorothea	1892 G	Dorothea Klumpke (1861–1942), American astronomer	DMP · 339
340 Eduarda	1892 H	Heinrich Eduard von Lade (1817–1904), German banker and amateur astronomer	DMP · 340
341 California	1892 J	California, US state	DMP · 341
342 Endymion	1892 K	Endymion, Greek mythology	DMP · 342
343 Ostara	1892 N	Ostara, Old High German name for Eostre, the Anglo-Saxon goddess of spring, reconstructed by Jacob Grimm in his Deutsche Mythologie	DMP · 343
344 Desiderata	1892 M	Désirée Clary (1777–1860), Queen of Sweden and Norway	DMP · 344
345 Tercidina	1892 O	Unknown origin of name	DMP · 345
346 Hermentaria	1892 P	Herment, village in Puy-de-Dôme, France	DMP · 346
347 Pariana	1892 Q	Unknown origin of name	DMP · 347
348 May	1892 R	Karl May (1842–1912), German author	DMP · 348
349 Dembowska	1892 T	Ercole Dembowski (1812–1881), Italian astronomer	DMP · 349
350 Ornamenta	1892 U	Antoinette Horneman from Scheveningen, daughter of a Dutch mariner. She was a very zealous member of the Société astronomique de France	DMP · 350
351 Yrsa	1892 V	Unknown origin of name; it may refer to Yrsa, queen in Norse mythology	DMP · 351
352 Gisela	1893 B	Gisela Wolf, wife of the discoverer, Max Wolf (1863–1932)	DMP · 352
353 Ruperto-Carola	1893 F	Ruprecht Karls University of Heidelberg	DMP · 353
354 Eleonora	1893 A	Unknown origin of name	DMP · 354
355 Gabriella	1893 E	Gabrielle Flammarion (1877–1962), French astronomer	DMP · 355
356 Liguria	1893 G	Liguria, region of Italy	DMP · 356
357 Ninina	1893 J	Unknown origin of name	DMP · 357
358 Apollonia	1893 K	Apollonia, Ancient Greek colony in Illyria	DMP · 358
359 Georgia	1893 M	King George II of Great Britain (1683–1760)	DMP · 359
360 Carlova	1893 N	Unknown origin of name; cf. discoverer Charlois	DMP · 360
361 Bononia	1893 P	Latin name for Bologna, Italy, and for Boulogne-sur-Mer, France	DMP · 361
362 Havnia	1893 R	Latin name for Copenhagen, Denmark	DMP · 362
363 Padua	1893 S	Padua, Italy	DMP · 363
364 Isara	1893 T	River Isère, France	DMP · 364
365 Corduba	1893 V	Latin name for Córdoba, Spain	DMP · 365
366 Vincentina	1893 W	Vincenzo Cerulli (1859–1927), Italian astronomer	DMP · 366
367 Amicitia	1893 AA	Latin for friendship	DMP · 367
368 Haidea	1893 AB	Unknown origin of name	DMP · 368
369 Aëria	1893 AE	Air, one of the four classical elements	DMP · 369
370 Modestia	1893 AC	Modesty	DMP · 370
371 Bohemia	1893 AD	Bohemia, region of Czech Republic	DMP · 371
372 Palma	1893 AH	Palma de Mallorca, Spain	DMP · 372
373 Melusina	1893 AJ	Probably Melusine, mythological French mermaid, associated with the origins of the Lusignan dynasty	DMP · 373
374 Burgundia	1893 AK	Burgundy, region of France	DMP · 374
375 Ursula	1893 AL	Unknown origin of name	DMP · 375
376 Geometria	1893 AM	Geometry	DMP · 376
377 Campania	1893 AN	Campania, region of Italy	DMP · 377
378 Holmia	1893 AP	Latin name for Stockholm, Sweden	DMP · 378
379 Huenna	1894 AQ	Latin name for Ven, Swedish island	DMP · 379
380 Fiducia	1894 AR	Latin for confidence	DMP · 380
381 Myrrha	1894 AS	Myrrha, Greek mythological princess	DMP · 381
382 Dodona	1894 AT	Dodona (now Dodoni), Greece	DMP · 382
383 Janina	1894 AU	Unknown origin of name	DMP · 383
384 Burdigala	1894 AV	Latin name for Bordeaux, France	DMP · 384
385 Ilmatar	1894 AX	Ilmatar, Finnish goddess	DMP · 385
386 Siegena	1894 AY	Siegen, Germany	DMP · 386
387 Aquitania	1894 AZ	Aquitaine, region of France	DMP · 387
388 Charybdis	1894 BA	Charybdis, mythological Greek monster	DMP · 388
389 Industria	1894 BB	Latin for diligence	DMP · 389
390 Alma	1894 BC	Alma River on the Crimean peninsula	DMP · 390
391 Ingeborg	1894 BE	Unknown origin of name; it may refer to Ingeborg from Norse mythology	DMP · 391
392 Wilhelmina	1894 BF	Queen Wilhelmina of the Netherlands (1880–1962)	DMP · 392
393 Lampetia	1894 BG	Lampetia, various Greek figures	DMP · 393
394 Arduina	1894 BH	Arduinna, Gaulish goddess	DMP · 394
395 Delia	1894 BK	Alternative name for the Greek goddess Artemis	DMP · 395
396 Aeolia	1894 BL	Aeolis or Aeolia, an ancient region of Asia Minor; or, the Aeolian Islands, Italy	DMP · 396
397 Vienna	1894 BM	Vienna, Austria	DMP · 397
398 Admete	1894 BN	Admete, Greek mythological woman	DMP · 398
399 Persephone	1895 BP	Persephone, Greek goddess	DMP · 399
400 Ducrosa	1895 BU	J. Ducros, French mechanician at Nice Observatory	DMP · 400

== 401–500 ==
back to top

Named minor planet	Provisional	This minor planet was named for...	Ref · Catalog
401 Ottilia	1895 BT	Ottilia, character in German folklore	DMP · 401
402 Chloë	1895 BW	Chloe, shepherdess from Greek mythology	DMP · 402
403 Cyane	1895 BX	Cyane, a nymph from Greek mythology	DMP · 403
404 Arsinoë	1895 BY	Arsinoe, mother of Orestes from Greek mythology	DMP · 404
405 Thia	1895 BZ	Theia, one of the twelve Titans from Greek mythology	DMP · 405
406 Erna	1895 CB	Erna Bidschof, granddaughter of Austrian astronomer Johann Palisa (1848–1925)	DMP · 406
407 Arachne	1895 CC	Arachne, Greek mythological woman	DMP · 407
408 Fama	1895 CD	Pheme (Fama), Roman goddess	DMP · 408
409 Aspasia	1895 CE	Aspasia (c. 470–400 BC), mistress of Pericles, Greek statesman and general of Athens during its golden age	DMP · 409
410 Chloris	1896 CH	Chloris, Greek goddess	DMP · 410
411 Xanthe	1896 CJ	Xanthe, an Oceanid (sea nymph) from Greek mythology. The numerous Oceanids are the daughters of Oceanus and Tethys (Titans).	DMP · 411
412 Elisabetha	1896 CK	Elise Wolf (1840–1924), mother of the discoverer Max Wolf	DMP · 412
413 Edburga	1896 CL	unknown origin of name	DMP · 413
414 Liriope	1896 CN	Liriope, mother of Narcissus from Greek mythology	DMP · 414
415 Palatia	1896 CO	The Electorate of the Palatinate, region of Germany	DMP · 415
416 Vaticana	1896 CS	Vatican Hill, Rome	DMP · 416
417 Suevia	1896 CT	Suevia, a fraternity of Heidelberg University	DMP · 417
418 Alemannia	1896 CV	Alemannia, a fraternity of Heidelberg University	DMP · 418
419 Aurelia	1896 CW	unknown origin of name	DMP · 419
420 Bertholda	1896 CY	Berthold I of Zähringen (c. 1000–1078), Margrave of Baden	DMP · 420
421 Zähringia	1896 CZ	The Zähringen family of Baden	DMP · 421
422 Berolina	1896 DA	Berolina, Latin name for the city of Berlin, Germany	DMP · 422
423 Diotima	1896 DB	Diotima of Mantinea, Greek teacher of Socrates	DMP · 423
424 Gratia	1896 DF	The Graces, Roman mythology	DMP · 424
425 Cornelia	1896 DC	Cornelia Africana, daughter of Scipio Africanus	DMP · 425
426 Hippo	1897 DH	Hippo Regius, now Annaba, ancient town in Algeria	DMP · 426
427 Galene	1897 DJ	Galene, a Nereid (sea nymph) from Greek mythology, one of the 50 daughters of Nereus and Doris.	DMP · 427
428 Monachia	1897 DK	Monachia, Latin name for the German city of Munich	DMP · 428
429 Lotis	1897 DL	Lotis, a nymph in Greek mythology	DMP · 429
430 Hybris	1897 DM	Hubris, Greek goddess	DMP · 430
431 Nephele	1897 DN	Nephele, a nymph in Greek mythology	DMP · 431
432 Pythia	1897 DO	The Pythia, Greek prophetess	DMP · 432
433 Eros	1898 DQ	Eros, Greek god	DMP · 433
434 Hungaria	1898 DR	Latin for Hungary, a country in Central Europe	DMP · 434
435 Ella	1898 DS	unknown origin of name	DMP · 435
436 Patricia	1898 DT	unknown origin of name	DMP · 436
437 Rhodia	1898 DP	Rhodia, an Oceanid (sea nymph) from Greek mythology	DMP · 437
438 Zeuxo	1898 DU	Zeuxo, an Oceanid in Greek mythology	DMP · 438
439 Ohio	1898 EB	Ohio, U.S. state and river	DMP · 439
440 Theodora	1898 EC	Theodora, daughter of Julius F. Stone, benefactor and time trustee of the Ohio State University	DMP · 440
441 Bathilde	1898 ED	unknown origin of name	DMP · 441
442 Eichsfeldia	1899 EE	The region of Eichsfeld, located in Lower Saxony, Germany	DMP · 442
443 Photographica	1899 EF	Photography, the method first used by Max Wolf (1863–1932) to discover asteroids	DMP · 443
444 Gyptis	1899 EL	Gyptis, wife of Protis, founder of Marseille, France	DMP · 444
445 Edna	1899 EX	Edna, wife of Julius F. Stone, benefactor and time trustee of the Ohio State University	DMP · 445
446 Aeternitas	1899 ER	Aeternitas, Roman god	DMP · 446
447 Valentine	1899 ES	Valentine, daughter of Baron Albert von Rothschild (1844–1911), benefactor	DMP · 447
448 Natalie	1899 ET	unknown origin of name	DMP · 448
449 Hamburga	1899 EU	The city of Hamburg, Germany	DMP · 449
450 Brigitta	1899 EV	unknown origin of name	DMP · 450
451 Patientia	1899 EY	Patientia, Latin for patience	DMP · 451
452 Hamiltonia	1899 FD	Mount Hamilton, California	DMP · 452
453 Tea	1900 FA	unknown origin of name	DMP · 453
454 Mathesis	1900 FC	Greek for (the act of) learning, chosen to mark the 300th anniversary of the Mathematische Gesellschaft in Hamburg founded in 1690	DMP · 454
455 Bruchsalia	1900 FG	Bruchsal, Germany	DMP · 455
456 Abnoba	1900 FH	Abnoba, Celtic goddess	DMP · 456
457 Alleghenia	1900 FJ	Allegheny Observatory, Pennsylvania, United States	DMP · 457
458 Hercynia	1900 FK	Latin name for a forested region of Germany	DMP · 458
459 Signe	1900 FM	Signy, sister of Sigmund in Norse mythology	DMP · 459
460 Scania	1900 FN	Skåne (Scania), region of Sweden	DMP · 460
461 Saskia	1900 FP	Saskia van Uylenburgh (1612–1642), wife of Rembrandt	DMP · 461
462 Eriphyla	1900 FQ	Eriphyle, mythological Greek woman	DMP · 462
463 Lola	1900 FS	Lola, character in Cavalleria Rusticana, opera by Italian composer Pietro Mascagni (1863–1945)	DMP · 463
464 Megaira	1901 FV	Megaira, one of the Greek Erinyes (Furies)	DMP · 464
465 Alekto	1901 FW	Alecto, one of the Greek Erinyes (Furies)	DMP · 465
466 Tisiphone	1901 FX	Tisiphone, one of the Greek Erinyes (Furies)	DMP · 466
467 Laura	1901 FY	Laura, character in La Gioconda, opera by Italian composer Amilcare Ponchielli (1834–1886). Alternatively, it may have been named after the character in Sonnets to Laura by Petrarch (1304–1374)	DMP · 467
468 Lina	1901 FZ	Lina, a maidservant of the discoverer Max Wolf (1863–1932)	DMP · 468
469 Argentina	1901 GE	Argentina, country in South America	DMP · 469
470 Kilia	1901 GJ	Latin for Kiel, Germany	DMP · 470
471 Papagena	1901 GN	Papagena, a character in Mozart's opera The Magic Flute	DMP · 471
472 Roma	1901 GP	The city of Rome, Italy	DMP · 472
473 Nolli	1901 GC	Nolli is a nickname for a small child used in Max Wolf's family (discoverer)	DMP · 473
474 Prudentia	1901 GD	Prudentia, Roman allegorical figure	DMP · 474
475 Ocllo	1901 HN	Ocllo, Inca queen, named after the wife of one of the four sons of Pirua Wiracocha, creator god of civilization in Inca mythology	DMP · 475
476 Hedwig	1901 GQ	Hedwig, wife of Swedish–Danish astronomer Elis Strömgren (1870–1947)	DMP · 476
477 Italia	1901 GR	Italy, country	DMP · 477
478 Tergeste	1901 GU	Latin name for Trieste, Italy	DMP · 478
479 Caprera	1901 HJ	Caprera, island in Sardinia, Italy	DMP · 479
480 Hansa	1901 GL	The Hanseatic League, a medieval confederation of merchant guilds and market towns in Northwestern and Central Europe	DMP · 480
481 Emita	1902 HP	unknown origin of name	DMP · 481
482 Petrina	1902 HT	Feminine form of Petrus, Latin for Peter, one of the discoverer's dogs (Max Wolf)	DMP · 482
483 Seppina	1902 HU	Sepp, name of one of the discoverer's dogs (Max Wolf)	DMP · 483
484 Pittsburghia	1902 HX	Pittsburgh, Pennsylvania, United States	DMP · 484
485 Genua	1902 HZ	Latin name for the city of Genoa, in Liguria, Italy	DMP · 485
486 Cremona	1902 JB	The city of Cremona in Lombardy, Italy	DMP · 486
487 Venetia	1902 JL	The Italian Veneto region with its capital Venice	DMP · 487
488 Kreusa	1902 JG	Creusa, various Greek figures	DMP · 488
489 Comacina	1902 JM	Comacina, island in Lake Como, Italy	DMP · 489
490 Veritas	1902 JP	Veritas, Roman goddess	DMP · 490
491 Carina	1902 JQ	unknown origin of name	DMP · 491
492 Gismonda	1902 JR	Gismonda, a figure in The Decameron, a collection of novellas by Italian Giovanni Boccaccio (1313–1375). She is the daughter of Tancred, prince of Salerno.	DMP · 492
493 Griseldis	1902 JS	Griselda, folk tale heroine	DMP · 493
494 Virtus	1902 JV	Virtus, Roman deity	DMP · 494
495 Eulalia	1902 KG	The grandmother of the discoverer's wife (Max Wolf)	DMP · 495
496 Gryphia	1902 KH	Andreas Gryphius, German poet	DMP · 496
497 Iva	1902 KJ	Iva Shores, daughter of the discoverer's landlord (Raymond Smith Dugan)	DMP · 497
498 Tokio	1902 KU	The city of Tokyo, Japan	DMP · 498
499 Venusia	1902 KX	Venusia, an alternative name for the Swedish island of Ven	DMP · 499
500 Selinur	1903 LA	Selinur, a character in the novel Auch Einer by German Friedrich Theodor Vischer (1807–1887)	DMP · 500

== 501–600 ==
back to top

Named minor planet	Provisional	This minor planet was named for...	Ref · Catalog
501 Urhixidur	1903 LB	Urhixidur, character in the novel Auch Einer by German Friedrich Theodor Vischer (1807–1887)	DMP · 501
502 Sigune	1903 LC	Sigune, character in the novel Auch Einer by German Friedrich Theodor Vischer (1807–1887). The name may originate from Arthurian legend, where Sigune is the cousin of Parzival.	DMP · 502
503 Evelyn	1903 LF	Evelyn Smith Dugan, the discoverer's (Raymond Smith Dugan) mother	DMP · 503
504 Cora	1902 LK	Cora, from Inca mythology. She is the wife of one of the four sons of Pirua Wiracocha, creator god of Inca civilization. Also see (5056).	DMP · 504
505 Cava	1902 LL	Mama Cava, Inca queen	DMP · 505
506 Marion	1903 LN	Marion Orcutt, cousin of American discoverer Raymond Smith Dugan (1878–1940)	DMP · 506
507 Laodica	1903 LO	Laodice from Greek mythology. She is the daughter of Hecuba and Trojan king Priam.	DMP · 507
508 Princetonia	1903 LQ	Princeton University, New Jersey, United States	DMP · 508
509 Iolanda	1903 LR	Unknown origin of name	DMP · 509
510 Mabella	1903 LT	Mabel Loomis Todd (1856–1932), American editor and writer. She is the daughter of the mathematician Elias Loomis, and the wife of astronomer David Peck Todd (see next entry).	DMP · 510
511 Davida	1903 LU	David Peck Todd (1855–1939), American astronomer and husband to Mabel Loomis Todd (see previous entry).	DMP · 511
512 Taurinensis	1903 LV	The city of Turin in northern Italy. Its Latin name is Taurinum.	DMP · 512
513 Centesima	1903 LY	Centesima, for the 100th discovery of an asteroid made by Max Wolf (1863–1932)	DMP · 513
514 Armida	1903 MB	Armida, fictional character in the epic poem Jerusalem Delivered by Italian baroque poet Torquato Tasso (1544–1595). The story of Armida and Rinaldo has also been the basis of several the operas including Armide by German bohemian Christoph Willibald Gluck (1714–1787), also see (579).	DMP · 514
515 Athalia	1903 ME	Athalia, Biblical queen of Judah (2 Kings ix)	DMP · 515
516 Amherstia	1903 MG	Amherst College in Massachusetts, United States, the alma mater of the discoverer Raymond Smith Dugan (1878–1940)	DMP · 516
517 Edith	1903 MH	Edith Dugan Eveleth, sister of American discoverer Raymond Smith Dugan	DMP · 517
518 Halawe	1903 MO	Halva (Halawe), a type of Arabic sweetmeat, a favourite of the discoverer Raymond Smith Dugan	DMP · 518
519 Sylvania	1903 MP	From "sylvan" (forest, wood), for the discoverer's (Raymond Smith Dugan) passion of tramping through the forests since he was a small boy	DMP · 519
520 Franziska	1903 MV	Unknown origin of name	DMP · 520
521 Brixia	1904 NB	The Italian city of Brescia (Brixia in Latin), birthplace of astronomer Emilio Bianchi, who computed the asteroid's orbit.	DMP · 521
522 Helga	1904 NC	([H] only says "Named by Lt. Th. Lassen, orbit computer"; see AN 169, 363. Note that computer does not refer to a personal computer, i.e. a machine, but rather to a person actually doing the necessary calculations)	DMP · 522
523 Ada	1904 ND	Ada Helme, school friend and neighbour of the discoverer	DMP · 523
524 Fidelio	1904 NN	Leonora's pseudonym in Beethoven's only opera Fidelio	DMP · 524
525 Adelaide	1908 EKa	Queen Adelaide, consort to King William IV ([H] says nothing) This name was first borne by a Max Wolf discovery until it was identified as 1171 Rusthawelia; the name was then reassigned to this J. H. Metcalf discovery	DMP · 525
526 Jena	1904 NQ	Jena, Germany, on the occasion of a meeting of the Astronomische Gesellschaft there in 1905 (see AN 172, 287)	DMP · 526
527 Euryanthe	1904 NR	The main character in the opera Euryanthe by German composer Carl Maria von Weber (1786–1826)	DMP · 527
528 Rezia	1904 NS	Rezia, a character in the opera Oberon by Carl Maria von Weber (1786–1826)	DMP · 528
529 Preziosa	1904 NT	Character in the short story La Gitanilla by Miguel de Cervantes (1547–1616)	DMP · 529
530 Turandot	1904 NV	Turandot, character in the opera Turandot by Giacomo Puccini (1858–1924)	DMP · 530
531 Zerlina	1904 NW	Zerlina, character in the opera Don Giovanni by Mozart (1756–1791)	DMP · 531
532 Herculina	1904 NY	Feminine form of Hercules, Roman demigod ([H] simply says "named by Prof. Elia Millosevich, Observatory of the Collegio Romano" AN 167, 45)	DMP · 532
533 Sara	1904 NZ	Sara, a friend of the discoverer Raymond Smith Dugan (1878–1940)	DMP · 533
534 Nassovia	1904 OA	The Nassau Hall is the oldest building at Princeton University in New Jersey, United States.	DMP · 534
535 Montague	1904 OC	The town of Montague, Massachusetts, the birthplace of the American discoverer Raymond Smith Dugan (1878–1940)	DMP · 535
536 Merapi	1904 OF	Mount Merapi on the island of Sumatra, Indonesia, site of several expeditions to observe the solar eclipse of 17 May 1901	DMP · 536
537 Pauly	1904 OG	Max Pauly, German businessman (manager of a sugar factory) and amateur optician whom Ernst Abbe appointed as head of the newly established Astronomy Division of Zeiss to design and produce telescope lenses; he ground the 10-inch lens of the Bruce double-astrograph, the "jewel" of the Heidelberg Observatory	DMP · 537
538 Friederike	1904 OK	Friederike, a friend of the discoverer Paul Götz (1883–1962) from Heidelberg, Germany	DMP · 538
539 Pamina	1904 OL	Pamina, a character in the opera The Magic Flute by Mozart (1756–1791)	DMP · 539
540 Rosamunde	1904 ON	The main character in the play Rosamunde by Helmina von Chézy, best remembered for its incidental music composed by Schubert (1797–1828)	DMP · 540
541 Deborah	1904 OO	Deborah, Biblical prophetess who helped to free the Israelites. She is mentioned in the Book of Judges.	DMP · 541
542 Susanna	1904 OQ	Susanna, a friend of the co-discoverer Paul Götz (1883–1962) from Heidelberg, Germany	DMP · 542
543 Charlotte	1904 OT	Charlotte, a friend of the discoverer Paul Götz (1883–1962) from Heidelberg, Germany	DMP · 543
544 Jetta	1904 OU	Jetta, a legendary German soothsayer. "Jettenbühl" is the site where Jetta was said to have lived and on which the medieval Heidelberg Castle was later built.	DMP · 544
545 Messalina	1904 OY	Messalina (c. 17/20–48), the third wife of Roman Emperor Claudius	DMP · 545
546 Herodias	1904 PA	Herodias (c. 15 BC – 39 AD), princess of the Herodian dynasty of Judaea during the time of the Roman Empire. She was a consort of Herod Antipas, the 1st-century ruler of Galilee and Perea. In the Gospels, Herodias plays a major role in the execution of John the Baptist.	DMP · 546
547 Praxedis	1904 PB	Praxedis, a character in the novel Ekkehard by German Joseph Victor von Scheffel (1826–1886)	DMP · 547
548 Kressida	1904 PC	Cressida, Trojan princess, character of Shakespeare's play Troilus and Cressida (based on the medieval legend of Troy, as opposed to the classical)	DMP · 548
549 Jessonda	1904 PK	Jessonda, a character in the opera Jessonda by German composer Louis Spohr (1784–1859)	DMP · 549
550 Senta	1904 PL	Senta, a character in the opera The Flying Dutchman by German composer Richard Wagner (1813–1883)	DMP · 550
551 Ortrud	1904 PM	Ortrud, a character in the opera Lohengrin by Richard Wagner, where she is the wife of Ferederick of Telramund.	DMP · 551
552 Sigelinde	1904 PO	Sigelinde, a character in the opera Die Walküre by Richard Wagner (1813–1883)	DMP · 552
553 Kundry	1904 PP	Kundry, a character in the opera Parsifal by Richard Wagner, who is both sorceress and mortal woman. The opera is based on the epic by Wolfram von Eschenbach.	DMP · 553
554 Peraga	1905 PS	The village of Vigonza (Peraga) in northern Italy, where the family of astronomer G. Abetti, who computed the asteroid's orbit, owned country villa.	DMP · 554
555 Norma	1905 PT	The main character in the opera Norma by Italian composer Vincenzo Bellini (1801–1835)	DMP · 555
556 Phyllis	1905 PW	Phyllis, from Greek mythology. The Thracian princess commits suicide when she realizes that her husband, king Demophon of Athens, will not return to her.	DMP · 556
557 Violetta	1905 PY	Violetta, the frivolous woman and leading character in the opera La traviata by Giuseppe Verdi. The opera is based on the novel La Dame aux Camélias by Alexandre Dumas fils (1824–1895)	DMP · 557
558 Carmen	1905 QB	The main character in the opera Carmen by French composer Georges Bizet (1838–1875). The opera is based on the novella Carmen by Prosper Mérimée (1803–1870).	DMP · 558
559 Nanon	1905 QD	The operetta Nanon, die Wirtin vom Goldenen Lamm by German-Austrian composer Richard Genée (1823–1895)	DMP · 559
560 Delila	1905 QF	Delilah, Biblical character, set to music by Saint-Saëns in his Samson et Dalila	DMP · 560
561 Ingwelde	1905 QG	Ingwelde, opera by Max von Schillings (?) ([H] simply says « German feminine first name »)	DMP · 561
562 Salome	1905 QH	Salomé, Biblical daughter of Herod the Great, character of Richard Strauss' opera Salome, in turn based on Oscar Wilde's Salomé play	DMP · 562
563 Suleika	1905 QK	Suleika, character in the philosophical novel Thus Spoke Zarathustra by Friedrich Nietzsche (1844–1900). Suleika and Dudu (see entry below) are mentioned in chapter "Among the Daughters of the Wilderness" (German: Unter Töchtern der Wüste, link) and are the novel's only feminine names.	DMP · 563
564 Dudu	1905 QM	Dudu, character in the philosophical novel Thus Spoke Zarathustra by Friedrich Nietzsche (1844–1900). Dudu and Suleika (see entry above) are mentioned in chapter "Among the Daughters of the Wilderness" (German: Unter Töchtern der Wüste, link) and are the novel's only feminine names.	DMP · 564
565 Marbachia	1905 QN	The town of Marbach in Hesse, Germany	DMP · 565
566 Stereoskopia	1905 QO	The Blink comparator, formerly known as "stereo-comparator", is an apparatus used to find differences between two photographs of the night sky by rapidly "blinking" back and forth between the two. In 1902, this asteroid was the first to be discovered by this method using photographic plates taken in 1899. The asteroid was named by the inventor of the Blink comparator, Carl Pulfrich (1858–1927).	DMP · 566
567 Eleutheria	1905 QP	Eleutheria, the goddess of liberty in Greek mythology. The counterpart of Eleutheria among the Roman gods is Libertas.	DMP · 567
568 Cheruskia	1905 QS	Cheruskia, student fraternity at Heidelberg University, named in turn after the Cherusci, an early German tribe	DMP · 568
569 Misa	1905 QT	Misa, from Greek mythology. She is the mother of Dionysus (Bacchus) and a divinity in Orphism, a mystic religion from the ancient Greek and Hellenistic world.	DMP · 569
570 Kythera	1905 QX	Kythira, Greek island (First name in a long list published in 1914)	DMP · 570
571 Dulcinea	1905 QZ	Dulcinea, a character in the novel Don Quixote by Miguel de Cervantes (1547–1616)	DMP · 571
572 Rebekka	1905 RB	Rebekka, a "bourgeois daughter" from Heidelberg, Germany. The name was given by the discoverer Paul Götz and may be inspired by the asteroid's provisional designation which contains the letters "RB".	DMP · 572
573 Recha	1905 RC	Recha, a character in the play Nathan der Weise by Gotthold Ephraim Lessing (1729–1781). The name may be inspired by the asteroid's provisional designation which contains the letters "RC".	DMP · 573
574 Reginhild	1905 RD	Unknown origin of name. The choice for the German feminine first name may have been inspired by the asteroid's provisional designation, containing the letters "RD".	DMP · 574
575 Renate	1905 RE	Unknown origin of name; the name may be inspired by the asteroid's provisional designation, containing the letters "RE".	DMP · 575
576 Emanuela	1905 RF	Emanuela, a friend of the discoverer Paul Götz (1883–1962)	DMP · 576
577 Rhea	1905 RH	Rhea, from Greek mythology. She is a Titan of the first generation and known as "the mother of gods". The name may be inspired by the asteroid's provisional designation, containing the letters "RH".	DMP · 577
578 Happelia	1905 RZ	Carl Happel (1820–1914), a German painter and benefactor of the Heidelberg Observatory, where the Happel Laboratory is named after him.	DMP · 578
579 Sidonia	1905 SD	Sidonia, character in the epic poem Jerusalem Delivered by Italian baroque poet Torquato Tasso (1544–1595). The character has also been adopted in the opera Armide by German bohemian Christoph Willibald Gluck (1714–1787), which is based on the poem. Also see (514). The name Sidonia may be inspired by the asteroid's provisional designation, containing the letters "SD".	DMP · 579
580 Selene	1905 SE	Selene, lunar goddess from Greek mythology	DMP · 580
581 Tauntonia	1905 SH	The city of Taunton, Massachusetts, in the United States, where this asteroid was discovered by Joel Hastings Metcalf	DMP · 581
582 Olympia	1906 SO	Olympia, Greece	DMP · 582
583 Klotilde	1905 SP	Klotilde, daughter of Austrian astronomer Edmund Weiss (1837–1917), director of the Vienna Observatory where this asteroid was discovered by Johann Palisa. It was named by Klotilde's mother, Adelinde Weiss (née Fenzel); also see (229).	DMP · 583
584 Semiramis	1906 SY	Semiramis, Assyrian queen	DMP · 584
585 Bilkis	1906 TA	The Biblical Queen of Sheba who visited King Solomon. In the Quran, she is known as "Bilqis", "Balqis" or "Balkis".	DMP · 585
586 Thekla	1906 TC	Thecla (born 30 AD), a saint of the early Christian Church	DMP · 586
587 Hypsipyle	1906 TF	Hypsipyle, mythological Greek queen of Lemnos, mother of twins by Jason	DMP · 587
588 Achilles	1906 TG	Achilles, the greatest warrior in Greek mythology	DMP · 588
589 Croatia	1906 TM	The country of Croatia in southeastern Europe	DMP · 589
590 Tomyris	1906 TO	Tomyris, Scythian Queen of the Massagetae	DMP · 590
591 Irmgard	1906 TP	Unknown origin of name. Irmgard is a common feminine first name in German.	DMP · 591
592 Bathseba	1906 TS	Bathsheba, wife of Urias, mother of Solomon	DMP · 592
593 Titania	1906 TT	Titania, folkloric queen of the fairies (name inspired by the provisional designation letters TT)	DMP · 593
594 Mireille	1906 TW	Mirèio, a narrative poem by French poet Frédéric Mistral (1830–1914), the source of inspiration for the opera Mireille by the French composer Charles Gounod	DMP · 594
595 Polyxena	1906 TZ	Polyxena, from Greek mythology. The Trojan princess is the daughter of Priam and Hecuba.	DMP · 595
596 Scheila	1906 UA	An English student at the University of Heidelberg, a friend of the discoverer	DMP · 596
597 Bandusia	1906 UB	Spring of Bandusia, a fountain near Polezzo in Italy	DMP · 597
598 Octavia	1906 UC	Octavia the Younger (c. 66 BC–11 BC), sister of Augustus	DMP · 598
599 Luisa	1906 UJ	Unknown origin of name	DMP · 599
600 Musa	1906 UM	The Muses, the nine inspirational goddesses of poetry, science, and the arts in Greek mythology	DMP · 600

== 601–700 ==
back to top

Named minor planet	Provisional	This minor planet was named for...	Ref · Catalog
601 Nerthus	1906 UN	Nerthus, Germanic/Scandinavian Earth Mother goddess	DMP · 601
602 Marianna	1906 TE	Unknown origin of name	DMP · 602
603 Timandra	1906 TJ	Timandra, mythological Greek woman, sister of Helen of Troy, mother of Evander	DMP · 603
604 Tekmessa	1906 TK	Tecmessa of Phrygia, mythological Greek woman, daughter of the Phrygian prince Teubrantes, captive of Ajax, by whom she had a son, Eurysaces	DMP · 604
605 Juvisia	1906 UU	The city of Juvisy-sur-Orge, France, location of the Camille Flammarion Observatory	DMP · 605
606 Brangäne	1906 VB	Brangäne, character in the opera Tristan und Isolde by Richard Wagner. She is a maid servant of Isolda.	DMP · 606
607 Jenny	1906 VC	Jenny Adolfine Kessler, friend of the discoverer August Kopff, on the occasion of her engagement	DMP · 607
608 Adolfine	1906 VD	Jenny Adolfine Kessler, friend of the discoverer August Kopff, on the occasion of her engagement	DMP · 608
609 Fulvia	1906 VF	Fulvia (c. 83 BC – 40 BC), aristocratic Roman woman and wife of Mark Antony	DMP · 609
610 Valeska	1906 VK	Unknown origin of name. The choice for this name may have been inspired by the asteroid's provisional designation, containing the letters "VK".	DMP · 610
611 Valeria	1906 VL	Unknown origin of name. The choice for this name may have been inspired by the asteroid's provisional designation, containing the letters "VL"	DMP · 611
612 Veronika	1906 VN	Unknown origin of name. The choice for this name may have been inspired by the asteroid's provisional designation, containing the letters "VN"	DMP · 612
613 Ginevra	1906 VP	Guinevere, wife of King Arthur from Arthurian legend (possibly)	DMP · 613
614 Pia	1906 VQ	Pia Observatory (German: Pia-Sternwarte), in Trieste, Italy, the private observatory of Johann Nepomuk Krieger (1865–1902), German amateur astronomer and selenographer	DMP · 614
615 Roswitha	1906 VR	Hrotsvitha of Gandersheim (c. 935–973), German poet	DMP · 615
616 Elly	1906 VT	Elly Böhm, wife of German mathematician Karl Böhm (1873–1958; bio-de)	DMP · 616
617 Patroclus	1906 VY	Patroclus, warrior from Greek mythology, close friend of Achilles and killed by Hector. The satellite of this Jupiter trojan, (617) Patroclus I Menoetius, was named after Menoetius, father of Patroclus.	DMP · 617
618 Elfriede	1906 VZ	Unknown origin of name	DMP · 618
619 Triberga	1906 WC	The town of Triberg im Schwarzwald, southern Germany	DMP · 619
620 Drakonia	1906 WE	Drake University, Iowa, US, where the orbit computers worked	DMP · 620
621 Werdandi	1906 WJ	Verdandi, one of the Norns in Norse mythology	DMP · 621
622 Esther	1906 WP	Esther, Biblical heroine described in the Book of Esther as a Jewish queen of the Persian king Ahasuerus	DMP · 622
623 Chimaera	1907 XJ	Mount Chimaera of Lycia, inspiration for the Chimera, mythological Greek monster	DMP · 623
624 Hektor	1907 XM	Hector, Trojan hero from Greek mythology	DMP · 624
625 Xenia	1907 XN	Unknown origin of name. The choice for this name may have been inspired by the asteroid's provisional designation, containing the letters "XN"	DMP · 625
626 Notburga	1907 XO	Saint Notburga (c. 1265–1313), holy character of the Neckar valley, the discovery site	DMP · 626
627 Charis	1907 XS	Charis, one of the Charites (Graces), the goddesses of charm, beauty, creativity, and fertility in Greek mythology. They are the daughters of Zeus and Eurynome and include Euphrosyne, Thalia and Aglaea (Aglaja).	DMP · 627
628 Christine	1907 XT	Unknown origin of name	DMP · 628
629 Bernardina	1907 XU	Unknown origin of name	DMP · 629
630 Euphemia	1907 XW	Saint Euphemia (died 303 AD), whose feast day is September 16. The name also means a good omen.	DMP · 630
631 Philippina	1907 YJ	Philipp Kessler, friend of the discoverer, on the occasion of his engagement. He is a friend of the astronomer August Kopff who discovered this asteroid (see also 634).	DMP · 631
632 Pyrrha	1907 YX	Pyrrha, wife of Deukalion, Greek mythological woman	DMP · 632
633 Zelima	1907 ZM	Unknown origin of name. The choice for this name may have been inspired by the asteroid's provisional designation, containing the letters "ZM"	DMP · 633
634 Ute	1907 ZN	Ute Kessler, on the occasion of her engagement. She is a friend of the astronomer August Kopff who discovered this asteroid (see also 631).	DMP · 634
635 Vundtia	1907 ZS	Wilhelm Wundt (1832–1920), German psychologist	DMP · 635
636 Erika	1907 XP	Unknown origin of name	DMP · 636
637 Chrysothemis	1907 YE	Chrysothemis, mythological daughter of Agamemnon, character in Sophocles' Electra	DMP · 637
638 Moira	1907 ZQ	Moirai (Moira), Greek goddess of fate	DMP · 638
639 Latona	1907 ZT	Roman goddess Latona, daughter of Ceo Titan, loved by Jupiter, and mother of Apollo and Diana	DMP · 639
640 Brambilla	1907 ZW	Prinzessin Brambilla, novel written by E. T. A. Hoffmann (1776–1822), and set to music by Walter Braunfels (1882–1954)	DMP · 640
641 Agnes	1907 ZX	Unknown origin of name	DMP · 641
642 Clara	1907 ZY	Clara, one of the discoverer's housekeepers (Max Wolf)	DMP · 642
643 Scheherezade	1907 ZZ	Scheherazade, legendary Arabic storyteller in 1001 Nights	DMP · 643
644 Cosima	1907 AA	Cosima Wagner (1837–1930), daughter of Hungarian pianist and composer Franz Liszt, and second wife of German composer Richard Wagner	DMP · 644
645 Agrippina	1907 AG	Agrippina the Elder (14 BC–33) and her daughter Agrippina the Younger (15–59), two Roman noblewomen. Former was the wife of general Germanicus and mother of Emperor Caligula, while the latter was the mother of Emperor Nero.	DMP · 645
646 Kastalia	1907 AC	Castalia, Greek nymph whom Apollo transformed into a fountain at Delphi, at the base of Mount Parnassos	DMP · 646
647 Adelgunde	1907 AD	Unknown origin of name	DMP · 647
648 Pippa	1907 AE	Pippa, main character in the novel And Pippa Dances (German: Und Pippa Tanzt!) by German writer Gerhardt Hauptmann (1862–1946)	DMP · 648
649 Josefa	1907 AF	Unknown origin of name. A feminine first name in German.	DMP · 649
650 Amalasuntha	1907 AM	Amalasuntha, Ostrogoth queen, daughter of Theoderich	DMP · 650
651 Antikleia	1907 AN	Anticlea, from Greek mythology. She is the wife of Laertes and mother of Odysseus.	DMP · 651
652 Jubilatrix	1907 AU	The 60-year jubilee of Emperor Franz Joseph of Austria, during which this minor planet was discovered	DMP · 652
653 Berenike	1907 BK	Berenice II of Egypt (c. 267–221 BC), queen of Cyrene and Egypt	DMP · 653
654 Zelinda	1908 BM	Zelinda Dini, sister of Italian mathematician Ulisse Dini (1845–1918). The name was proposed by astronomer Elia Millosevich, a good friend of Dini.	DMP · 654
655 Briseïs	1907 BF	Briseis, mythological Trojan slave	DMP · 655
656 Beagle	1908 BU	HMS Beagle, Darwin's ship	DMP · 656
657 Gunlöd	1908 BV	Gunnlod, mythological Norse giantess	DMP · 657
658 Asteria	1908 BW	Asteria, various Greek figures	DMP · 658
659 Nestor	1908 CS	Nestor, mythological Greek king	DMP · 659
660 Crescentia	1908 CC	Heroine of a German legend, a variant of the Genevieve of Brabant medieval story, found in the Historie von der geduldigen Konigin Crescentia, itself based on a 12th-century poem in the Kaiserchronik	DMP · 660
661 Cloelia	1908 CL	Cloelia, legendary Roman woman	DMP · 661
662 Newtonia	1908 CW	previously believed to refer to Isaac Newton, British physicist; but later correctly identified as being named after Newton, Massachusetts (Isaac Newton is now honored by asteroid 8000 Isaac Newton)	DMP · 662
663 Gerlinde	1908 DG	Unknown origin of name	DMP · 663
664 Judith	1908 DH	Biblical heroine dramatised in Friedrich Hebbel's play Judith	DMP · 664
665 Sabine	1908 DK	Unknown origin of name.	DMP · 665
666 Desdemona	1908 DM	Desdemona, character in Shakespeare's Othello. The name may have been inspired by the asteroid's provisional designation, containing the letters "DM".	DMP · 666
667 Denise	1908 DN	Unknown origin of name. The choice for this name may have been inspired by the asteroid's provisional designation, containing the letters "DN".	DMP · 667
668 Dora	1908 DO	Dora, a friend of the wife of astronomer August Kopff, who discovered this asteroid. The name may have been inspired by the asteroid's provisional designation, containing the letters "DO".	DMP · 668
669 Kypria	1908 DQ	Kypria, poem sometimes attributed to Homer, which serves as an introduction to the Iliad	DMP · 669
670 Ottegebe	1908 DR	Character in Gerhardt Hauptmann's play Der arme Heinrich	DMP · 670
671 Carnegia	1908 DV	The Carnegie Institution of Washington, DC, founded by Andrew Carnegie, Scottish-born American businessman and philanthropist	DMP · 671
672 Astarte	1908 DY	'Ashtart, Phoenician goddess of love and fertility	DMP · 672
673 Edda	1908 EA	The Norse Edda, a collection of myths	DMP · 673
674 Rachele	1908 EP	Wife of Italian astronomer Emilio Bianchi, the orbit computer	DMP · 674
675 Ludmilla	1908 DU	Character in the opera Ruslan and Lyudmila by Russian composer Mikhail Glinka (1804–1857)	DMP · 675
676 Melitta	1909 FN	Attic form of the Greek name Melissa, nymph changed into a bee (and also an allusion to the discoverer's name, Melotte)	DMP · 676
677 Aaltje	1909 FR	Aaltje Noordewier–Reddingius (1868–1949), a Dutch classical soprano	DMP · 677
678 Fredegundis	1909 FS	Fredegundis, an opera based on the life of Fredegund (a.k.a. Fredegunda, Fredegundis, Fredigundis, Frédégonde, Queen consort of Chilperic I, the Merovingian Frankish king of Soissons), begun by the French composer Ernest Guirand and completed by Saint-Saëns	DMP · 678
679 Pax	1909 FY	Pax, Roman goddess of peace. Her Greek equivalent is Eirene.	DMP · 679
680 Genoveva	1909 GW	Main character in Friedrich Hebbel's play Genoveva	DMP · 680
681 Gorgo	1909 GZ	Gorgon (German: Gorgo) one of the three sisters – Euryale, Stheno, and Medusa – who had hair made of living, venomous snakes and a gaze that could turn one to stone. Paul Herget reports that Ingrid van Houten-Groeneveld and Antonio Paluzie-Borrell thought the name refers to Gorgo (a.k.a. Gorgos, Gorgus), King of Salamine (Salamis, Cyprus) in the 5th century B.C., who accompanied Xerxes in Greece.	DMP · 681
682 Hagar	1909 HA	Hagar, Biblical woman in the Book of Genesis	DMP · 682
683 Lanzia	1909 HC	Karl Lanz (1873–1921; bio-de), a German mechanical engineer and industrialist who provided the funds for the re-establishment of the Heidelberg Academy of Sciences and Humanities	DMP · 683
684 Hildburg	1909 HD	Unknown origin of name. The choice for this German feminine first name may have been inspired by the asteroid's provisional designation, containing the letters "HD".	DMP · 684
685 Hermia	1909 HE	Unknown origin of name	DMP · 685
686 Gersuind	1909 HF	Main character in the play Gersuind by Gerhart Hauptmann	DMP · 686
687 Tinette	1909 HG	Unknown origin of name	DMP · 687
688 Melanie	1909 HH	Unknown origin of name	DMP · 688
689 Zita	1909 HJ	Princess Zita of Bourbon-Parma, wife of Emperor Charles I of Austria	DMP · 689
690 Wratislavia	1909 HZ	Latin for Breslau (Wrocław), now in Poland	DMP · 690
691 Lehigh	1909 JG	Lehigh University, US, where the computer (J. B. Reynolds) was	DMP · 691
692 Hippodamia	1901 HD	Hippodamia, queen of Pisa from Greek mythology. She is the wife of Pelops and ancestor to king Agamemnon. The choice for this name may have been inspired by the asteroid's provisional designation, containing the letters "HD".	DMP · 692
693 Zerbinetta	1909 HN	Character in Richard Strauss' opera Ariadne auf Naxos	DMP · 693
694 Ekard	1909 JA	Drake University, US ('Drake' backwards), where the orbit computers (S. B. Nicholson and his wife) were	DMP · 694
695 Bella	1909 JB	Unknown origin of name	DMP · 695
696 Leonora	1910 JJ	Mary Leonora Snow, wife of the orbit computer, Arthur Snow	DMP · 696
697 Galilea	1910 JO	Galileo Galilei (1564–1642), on the occasion of the 300th anniversary of his discovery of the Galilean moons	DMP · 697
698 Ernestina	1910 JX	Ernst Wolf, son of the discoverer Max Wolf (1863–1932)	DMP · 698
699 Hela	1910 KD	Hel, Norse goddess of the dead	DMP · 699
700 Auravictrix	1910 KE	Latin for 'victory against the wind' (named for the first Schütte-Lanz Zeppelin flights in 1911)	DMP · 700

== 701–800 ==
back to top

Named minor planet	Provisional	This minor planet was named for...	Ref · Catalog
701 Oriola	1910 KN	The Old World golden oriole, Oriolus oriolus	DMP · 701
702 Alauda	1910 KQ	The bird genus Alauda (larks)	DMP · 702
703 Noëmi	1910 KT	Valentine Noëmi von Rothschild, wife of Baron Sigismund von Springer (presumed). Alternatively, Noemi is a Biblical heroine from the Book of Ruth (unsourced)	DMP · 703
704 Interamnia	1910 KU	Latin for city of Terni (Teramo) in Italy, birthplace of the discoverer Vincenzo Cerulli. Several Roman towns were called Interamnia, meaning "in between two rivers".	DMP · 704
705 Erminia	1910 KV	The comic operetta Erminie, by Edward Jacobowsky	DMP · 705
706 Hirundo	1910 KX	The bird genus Hirundo (swallows)	DMP · 706
707 Steina	1910 LD	Mr. Stein, a benefactor of the Breslau Observatory (547) in former German Empire, now Poland	DMP · 707
708 Raphaela	1911 LJ	Raphaël Bischoffsheim (1823–1906), French banker and philanthropist, founder of the Nice Observatory	DMP · 708
709 Fringilla	1911 LK	The bird genus Fringilla (finches)	DMP · 709
710 Gertrud	1911 LM	Gertrud Rheden, daughter of Austrian astronomer Joseph Rheden and granddaughter of the discoverer Johann Palisa	DMP · 710
711 Marmulla	1911 LN	Marble, the small spherical toy. The name is possibly derived from the German medieval word "Marmul", according to astronomer Paul Wild. The asteroid's name was originally spelt "Marmula".	DMP · 711
712 Boliviana	1911 LO	Simón Bolívar (1783–1830), South American revolutionary	DMP · 712
713 Luscinia	1911 LS	The bird genus Luscinia (nightingales)	DMP · 713
714 Ulula	1911 LW	The bird genus Ulula (owls)	DMP · 714
715 Transvaalia	1911 LX	The province of Transvaal in South Africa. This is the first numbered minor planet discovered in Africa.	DMP · 715
716 Berkeley	1911 MD	University of California, Berkeley	DMP · 716
717 Wisibada	1911 MJ	The German city of Wiesbaden, birthplace of the discoverer Franz Kaiser (1891–1962)	DMP · 717
718 Erida	1911 MS	Erida, daughter of American astronomer Armin Otto Leuschner (1868–1953)	DMP · 718
719 Albert	1911 MT	Baron Albert Salomon von Rothschild (1844–1911), benefactor of the Vienna Observatory	DMP · 719
720 Bohlinia	1911 MW	Karl Petrus Theodor Bohlin (1860–1939), Swedish astronomer, who studied Jupiter's perturbations. The name was given on the occasion of his 65th birthday.	DMP · 720
721 Tabora	1911 MZ	The Tabora, an ocean liner visited during an astronomical conference	DMP · 721
722 Frieda	1911 NA	Frieda, the daughter of Austrian astronomer Karl Hillebrand (1861–1939; bio-de)	DMP · 722
723 Hammonia	1911 NB	Hamburg, Germany	DMP · 723
724 Hapag	1911 NC	The Hamburg America Line (HAPAG), after the shipping line	DMP · 724
725 Amanda	1911 ND	Amanda Schorr, wife of German astronomer Richard Schorr, see (1235)	DMP · 725
726 Joëlla	1911 NM	Feminine form of Joël, for Joel Hastings Metcalf, American Unitarian minister and astronomer	DMP · 726
727 Nipponia	1912 NT	Japan, where the minor planet was accidentally discovered twice (1900 FE; 1908 CV) by Shin Hirayama	DMP · 727
728 Leonisis	1912 NU	Leo Gans (1843–1935; bio-de), German chemist and president of the Physical Society at Frankfurt (German: Physikalischer Verein), named on the occasion of his 70th birthday. The Society's emblem shows the goddess Isis, and contributed to the ending of the asteroid's name.	DMP · 728
729 Watsonia	1912 OD	James Craig Watson (1838–1880), Canadian-American astronomer	DMP · 729
730 Athanasia	1912 OK	Greek for immortality	DMP · 730
731 Sorga	1912 OQ	Surga, Indonesian for "heavens"	DMP · 731
732 Tjilaki	1912 OR	Tjilaki (Cilaki) river and village near Malabar, Indonesia	DMP · 732
733 Mocia	1912 PF	Werner "Mok" Wolf, son of the German discoverer Max Wolf	DMP · 733
734 Benda	1912 PH	Anna Benda, wife of Austrian discoverer Johann Palisa. (In some publications the name has been erroneously attributed to Czech composer Karel Bendl, 1838–1897)	DMP · 734
735 Marghanna	1912 PY	Margarete Vogt, mother of German discoverer Heinrich Vogt; and Hanna, a relative of his	DMP · 735
736 Harvard	1912 PZ	Harvard University, US	DMP · 736
737 Arequipa	1912 QB	Arequipa, Peru, where Harvard University had an observing station	DMP · 737
738 Alagasta	1913 QO	Original name of the German city Gau-Algesheim (Gaualgesheim), native city of discoverer's family (Franz Kaiser)	DMP · 738
739 Mandeville	1913 QR	Mandeville, Jamaica	DMP · 739
740 Cantabia	1913 QS	Contraction of Cantabrigia, Latin for Cambridge, named in honour of Cambridge, Massachusetts and its Harvard University	DMP · 740
741 Botolphia	1913 QT	Saint Botolph, 7th-century founder of the monastery that would become Boston, Lincolnshire, England	DMP · 741
742 Edisona	1913 QU	Thomas Edison, American inventor	DMP · 742
743 Eugenisis	1913 QV	Eugenisis, for "good creation" (composed Greek word: "eu" for good, well and "genesis" for creation). It was named by the discoverer Franz Kaiser for the birth of his daughter.	DMP · 743
744 Aguntina	1913 QW	Aguntum, the ancient Roman settlement in the province of Noricum, near the Austrian town of Lienz, Tyrol, the birthplace of the discoverer Adam Massinger (1888–1914)	DMP · 744
745 Mauritia	1913 QX	Saint Maurice (Saint Mauritius), patron saint of a church in Wiesbaden, Germany	DMP · 745
746 Marlu	1913 QY	Marie-Louise Kaiser, a German medical doctor and daughter of the discoverer Franz Kaiser	DMP · 746
747 Winchester	1913 QZ	Winchester, Massachusetts, United States, location of the Taunton Observatory (803) where this asteroid was discovered by Joel Hastings Metcalf	DMP · 747
748 Simeïsa	1913 RD	Simeïs Observatory, Crimea, Ukraine, the discovery site	DMP · 748
749 Malzovia	1913 RF	Nikolai Sergeevich Maltsov (S. I. Maltsov), Russian amateur astronomer, founder of Simeïs Observatory	DMP · 749
750 Oskar	1913 RG	Oskar Ruben von Rothschild (1888–1909), the youngest son of Albert Salomon Anselm von Rothschild	DMP · 750
751 Faïna	1913 RK	Faina Mikhajlovna Neujmina, colleague and first wife of the discoverer Grigory Neujmin (1886–1946)	DMP · 751
752 Sulamitis	1913 RL	Sulamith, Biblical woman identified with the Queen of Sheba	DMP · 752
753 Tiflis	1913 RM	The city of Tbilisi in Georgia, birthplace of the discoverer Grigory Neujmin (1886–1946)	DMP · 753
754 Malabar	1906 UT	Malabar, Java, Indonesia, commemorating the Dutch-German solar eclipse expedition of 1922 to Christmas Island	DMP · 754
755 Quintilla	1908 CZ	Quintilla, feminine Italian first name, chosen because no other planet had a name beginning with Q so far.	DMP · 755
756 Lilliana	1908 DC	Lillian, sister of American astronomer Harlow Shapley (1885–1972)	DMP · 756
757 Portlandia	1908 EJ	The city of Portland in Maine, United States, where the discoverer, Joel Hastings Metcalf (1866–1925), was a church minister at the time of his death	DMP · 757
758 Mancunia	1912 PE	The city of Manchester, United Kingdom (by its Latin name "Mancunia"), native city of the discoverer, Harry Edwin Wood (1881–1946)	DMP · 758
759 Vinifera	1913 SJ	Vitis vinifera, the wine grape, former means of livelihood of the discoverer's ancestors	DMP · 759
760 Massinga	1913 SL	Adam Massinger (1888–1914), a German astronomer and discoverer of minor planets at Heidelberg Observatory who was killed in World War I (Src)	DMP · 760
761 Brendelia	1913 SO	Martin Brendel (1862–1939), German astronomer, director of the International Planet Institute, who chose this minor planet amongst Kaiser's unnamed discoveries for its small orbital inclination	DMP · 761
762 Pulcova	1913 SQ	Pulkovo Heights, hills near St. Petersburg, site of the oldest Russian observatory, Pulkovo Observatory	DMP · 762
763 Cupido	1913 ST	Cupid, Roman god, because of the minor planet's relative closeness to the Sun	DMP · 763
764 Gedania	1913 SU	The city of Gdańsk, Poland (formerly Free City of Danzig) where the discoverer, Franz Kaiser (1891–1962), was an assistant at the observatory during the early 1920s.	DMP · 764
765 Mattiaca	1913 SV	The city of Wiesbaden in Germany (by its Latin name "Mattiacum"), home town of discoverer Franz Kaiser (1891–1962)	DMP · 765
766 Moguntia	1913 SW	The city of Mainz in Germany (by its Latin name "Moguntia"), where the discoverer, Franz Kaiser, taught at city's Johannes Gutenberg University	DMP · 766
767 Bondia	1913 SX	William Cranch Bond (1789–1859) and his son George Phillips Bond (1825–1865), both American astronomers and directors of the Harvard College Observatory in Cambridge, Massachusetts.	DMP · 767
768 Struveana	1913 SZ	Friedrich Georg Wilhelm Struve (1793–1864), Otto Wilhelm Struve (1819–1905) and Hermann Struve (1854–1920), Russo-German astronomers, known for their double star studies and directors of the Pulkovo and Berlin Observatory observatories, respectively.	DMP · 768
769 Tatjana	1913 TA	Tatjana, a colleague of the discover Grigory Neujmin at Pulkovo Observatory in Saint Petersburg, Russia. Alternatively, "Tatjana" may refer to the heroine in the novel Eugene Onegin by Aleksandr Pushkin.	DMP · 769
770 Bali	1913 TE	Mahabali (Bali), King of the Daityas in the Hindu Puranas	DMP · 770
771 Libera	1913 TO	A friend of the discoverer (the minor planet was named by his widow)	DMP · 771
772 Tanete	1913 TR	The city of Tanete on the island of Sulawesi in Indonesia	DMP · 772
773 Irmintraud	1913 TV	Feminine German first name, common in old myths and legends	DMP · 773
774 Armor	1913 TW	Armorica, Celtic name for Northwest France (Brittany and Normandy)	DMP · 774
775 Lumière	1914 TX	The brothers Auguste and Louis Lumière (1862–1954; 1864–1948), French physicists and pioneers of photography and cinematography	DMP · 775
776 Berbericia	1914 TY	Adolf Berberich (1861–1920), German astronomer	DMP · 776
777 Gutemberga	1914 TZ	Johannes Gutenberg (c. 1400–1468), printing pioneer	DMP · 777
778 Theobalda	1914 UA	Theobald Kaiser, father of German discoverer Franz Kaiser (1891–1962)	DMP · 778
779 Nina	1914 UB	Nina Nikolaevna Neujmina (1877–1956), mathematician and sister of Russian discoverer Grigory Neujmin	DMP · 779
780 Armenia	1914 UC	The country of Armenia in the South Caucasus	DMP · 780
781 Kartvelia	1914 UF	Kartveli, Georgian name for the Georgian people	DMP · 781
782 Montefiore	1914 UK	Clarice Sebag-Montefiore, wife of Alphonse Mayer Rothschild (1878–1942), the second son of Baron Albert von Rothschild	DMP · 782
783 Nora	1914 UL	Nora, heroine in the play A Doll's House by Norwegian writer Henrik Ibsen (1828–1906)	DMP · 783
784 Pickeringia	1914 UM	Edward Charles Pickering (1846–1919) and his brother William Henry Pickering (1858–1938), both American astronomers	DMP · 784
785 Zwetana	1914 UN	Tsvetana Popova, daughter of professor Kyrille Popoff (also Popoff or Pophoff) of Sofia, Bulgaria	DMP · 785
786 Bredichina	1914 UO	Fyodor Bredikhin (1831–1904), Russian astronomer	DMP · 786
787 Moskva	1914 UQ	The city of Moscow in Russia	DMP · 787
788 Hohensteina	1914 UR	Hohnstein Castle near Bad Schwalbach in Hesse, Germany, hometown of the wife of the discoverer, Franz Kaiser (1891–1962). Her ancestors derive from the castle's Order of Knighthood, "Breder von Hohenstein".	DMP · 788
789 Lena	1914 UU	Elena Petrovna Neujmina (1860–1942), mother of the discoverer Grigory Neujmin.	DMP · 789
790 Pretoria	1912 NW	The city of Pretoria in South Africa	DMP · 790
791 Ani	1914 UV	Ani, ruined city in Armenia	DMP · 791
792 Metcalfia	1907 ZC	Joel Hastings Metcalf (1866–1925), American Unitarian minister and astronomer	DMP · 792
793 Arizona	1907 ZD	The U.S. state of Arizona, where the Lowell Observatory is located in Flagstaff	DMP · 793
794 Irenaea	1914 VB	Irene Hillebrand, née Weiss, daughter of Austrian astronomer Edmund Weiss (1837–1917), director of the Vienna Observatory. The name's aea-suffix was needed to avoid conflict with asteroid 14 Irene.	DMP · 794
795 Fini	1914 VE	Unknown origin of name. Fini is an Austrian diminutive of Josephine.	DMP · 795
796 Sarita	1914 VH	Unknown origin of name	DMP · 796
797 Montana	1914 VR	From mons, the Latin for mountain, in honour of Hamburg Observatory, located at Bergedorf, in Germany. It was the observatory's first minor-planet discovery	DMP · 797
798 Ruth	1914 VT	Ruth, Biblical heroine in the Old Testament	DMP · 798
799 Gudula	1915 WO	Gudula, German feminine first name, from the calendar Lahrer Hinkender Bote	DMP · 799
800 Kressmannia	1915 WP	Major A. Kressmann (or Kreßmann), benefactor who donated the 318-mm Kressmann Refractor to the Heidelberg Observatory, Germany. The telescope was used for Double Star measurements and was hosted in the dome of Heidelberg's Ostinstitut until 1978, when it was replaced by the 50-centimeter telescope (Src).	DMP · 800

== 801–900 ==
back to top

Named minor planet	Provisional	This minor planet was named for...	Ref · Catalog
801 Helwerthia	1915 WQ	Elise Helwerth–Wolf (1840–1924), mother of the discoverer Max Wolf; also see (412)	DMP · 801
802 Epyaxa	1915 WR	Epyaxa, queen of Syennesis, wife to King of Cilicia in South Asia Minor in the 5th century BCE	DMP · 802
803 Picka	1915 WS	Friedrich Pick (1867–1921), a Czech medical doctor who first introduced endoscopy in medicine	DMP · 803
804 Hispania	1915 WT	The country of Spain, named by its Latin name, Hispania. It was the first discovery of an asteroid ever made in Spain.	DMP · 804
805 Hormuthia	1915 WW	Hormuth Kopff, wife of German astronomer August Kopff, assistant to the discoverer, Max Wolf.	DMP · 805
806 Gyldénia	1915 WX	Hugo Gyldén (1841–1896), Swedish astronomer at Stockholm Observatory	DMP · 806
807 Ceraskia	1915 WY	Vitold Tserasky (1849–1925), also known as Vitold Cerasky or Vitol'd Karlovic Tseraskiy, a Russian astronomer and director at the Moscow Observatory (105). The lunar crater Tseraskiy is named after him. His wife, Lidiya Tseraskaya was also an astronomer.	DMP · 807
808 Merxia	1901 GY	Adalbert Merx, the father-in-law of Max Wolf. The discovery was made by his assistant Luigi Carnera at Heidelberg.	DMP · 808
809 Lundia	1915 XP	Lund Observatory, located in Lund, southern Sweden	DMP · 809
810 Atossa	1915 XQ	Atossa (550–475 BC), ancient Persian queen, daughter of Cyrus, wife of Darius	DMP · 810
811 Nauheima	1915 XR	The town of Bad Nauheim in Hesse, Germany	DMP · 811
812 Adele	1915 XV	Adele, character in the operetta Die Fledermaus by Johann Strauss (1825–1899)	DMP · 812
813 Baumeia	1915 YR	"H. Baum", a German student of astronomy at Heidelberg University who died in World War I	DMP · 813
814 Tauris	1916 YT	Tauris, ancient name of the Crimean peninsula (Schmadel says "Tauric Mount", but there is no such mountain)	DMP · 814
815 Coppelia	1916 YU	The comic ballet Coppélia by composer Léo Delibes (1836–1891) based upon a story by E. T. A. Hoffmann (1776–1822)	DMP · 815
816 Juliana	1916 YV	Queen Juliana of the Netherlands (1909–2004)	DMP · 816
817 Annika	1916 YW	Unknown origin of name	DMP · 817
818 Kapteynia	1916 YZ	Jacobus Kapteyn (1851–1922), Dutch astronomer	DMP · 818
819 Barnardiana	1916 ZA	Edward Emerson Barnard (1857–1923), American astronomer	DMP · 819
820 Adriana	1916 ZB	Unknown origin of name	DMP · 820
821 Fanny	1916 ZC	Unknown origin of name	DMP · 821
822 Lalage	1916 ZD	Unknown origin of name	DMP · 822
823 Sisigambis	1916 ZG	Sisygambis (died 323 BC), mother of Darius III of Persia	DMP · 823
824 Anastasia	1916 ZH	Anastasia Semenoff, an acquaintance of Russian discoverer Grigory Neujmin (1886–1946)	DMP · 824
825 Tanina	1916 ZL	Unknown origin of name	DMP · 825
826 Henrika	1916 ZO	Unknown origin of name	DMP · 826
827 Wolfiana	1916 ZW	Max Wolf (1863–1932), German astronomer	DMP · 827
828 Lindemannia	1916 ZX	Adolph Friedrich Lindemann (1846 – 25 August 1931), German-born British amateur astronomer, inventor of the Lindemann electrometer, a quadrant electrometer	DMP · 828
829 Academia	1916 ZY	The Russian Academy of Sciences, St. Petersburg, on the occasion of its 200th anniversary	DMP · 829
830 Petropolitana	1916 ZZ	The city of Saint Petersburg, Russia, by its Latin name "Petropolis"	DMP · 830
831 Stateira	1916 AA	Stateira (died c. 400 BC), wife of Artaxerxes II of Persia	DMP · 831
832 Karin	1916 AB	Karin Månsdotter (1550–1612), Swedish queen and wife of Eric XIV of Sweden	DMP · 832
833 Monica	1916 AC	Unknown origin of name	DMP · 833
834 Burnhamia	1916 AD	Sherburne Wesley Burnham (1838–1921), American astronomer who discovered many visual binary stars. He observed from the Chicago (1877), Lick (1888) and Yerkes (1897) observatories.	DMP · 834
835 Olivia	1916 AE	Unknown origin of name	DMP · 835
836 Jole	1916 AF	Iole, wife of divine hero Heracles in Greek mythology	DMP · 836
837 Schwarzschilda	1916 AG	Karl Schwarzschild (1873–1916), German physicist and astronomer, best known for his solution of Einstein's field equations, leading to the Schwarzschild radius. He was the director of the Göttingen and Potsdam-Babelsberg observatories.	DMP · 837
838 Seraphina	1916 AH	Unknown origin of name	DMP · 838
839 Valborg	1916 AJ	Valborg, heroine in the play Axel and Valborg by Danish poet and playwright Adam Oehlenschläger (1779–1850)	DMP · 839
840 Zenobia	1916 AK	Zenobia (died c. 290 AD), a Christian martyr. Alternatively, it may refer to Zenobia (c. 240 – c. 274 AD), the queen of the Palmyrene Empire in Syria, who was defeated by Aurelian in 272 AD.	DMP · 840
841 Arabella	1916 AL	The opera Arabella by German composer Richard Strauss (1864–1949)	DMP · 841
842 Kerstin	1916 AM	Unknown origin of name. It is a German feminine first name.	DMP · 842
843 Nicolaia	1916 AN	Thorvald N. Thiele (1838–1910), Danish astronomer, actuary and mathematician. He is the father of the discoverer Holger Thiele.	DMP · 843
844 Leontina	1916 AP	The town of Lienz, Austria, birthplace of the asteroid's discoverer, Joseph Rheden (1873–1946)	DMP · 844
845 Naëma	1916 AS	Unknown origin of name	DMP · 845
846 Lipperta	1916 AT	Eduard Lippert (1844–1925; bio-de), a German businessman and benefactor of the Hamburg Observatory, who to donated the "Lippert Astrograph".	DMP · 846
847 Agnia	1915 XX	Agnia Ivanovna Bad'ina (1877–1956), a Russian medical doctor from Simeiz, on the Crimean peninsula	DMP · 847
848 Inna	1915 XS	Nikolaevna Leman-Balanovskaya (1881–1945), a Russian astronomer at the Pulkovo Observatory near St Petersburg	DMP · 848
849 Ara	1912 NY	American Relief Administration (ARA), in appreciation of the help it gave during the Russian famine of 1922–1923	DMP · 849
850 Altona	1916 S24	Altona, Germany, location of the Altona Observatory at which H. C. Schumacher began publication of the astronomical journal Astronomische Nachrichten in 1821	DMP · 850
851 Zeissia	1916 S26	Zeiss Optical Works	DMP · 851
852 Wladilena	1916 S27	Vladimir Lenin (1870–1924), Russian communist revolutionary, politician and Soviet leader	DMP · 852
853 Nansenia	1916 S28	Fridtjof Nansen (1861–1930), Norwegian polar explorer	DMP · 853
854 Frostia	1916 S29	Edwin Brant Frost (1866–1935), an American astronomer	DMP · 854
855 Newcombia	1916 ZP	Simon Newcomb (1835–1909), a Canadian–American professor of astronomy and director of the U.S. Nautical Almanac Office at United States Naval Observatory	DMP · 855
856 Backlunda	1916 S30	Oskar Backlund (1846–1916), Swedish-Russian astronomer	DMP · 856
857 Glasenappia	1916 S33	Sergey Glazenap (1848–1937), a Soviet astronomer, director of both St. Petersburg and Pulkovo Observatory and founder of the Russian Astronomical Society	DMP · 857
858 El Djezaïr	1916 a	The city of Algiers, Algeria by its Arabian name meaning "the islands".	DMP · 858
859 Bouzaréah	1916 c	The borough of Bouzaréah, in the city of Algiers, Algeria. It is the site of Algiers Observatory.	DMP · 859
860 Ursina	1917 BD	Unknown origin of name	DMP · 860
861 Aïda	1917 BE	Aïda, opera by the Italian composer Giuseppe Verdi (1813–1901)	DMP · 861
862 Franzia	1917 BF	Franz Wolf, son of the discoverer Max Wolf	DMP · 862
863 Benkoela	1917 BH	The city of Benkoelen on the island of Sumatra, Indonesia (possibly)	DMP · 863
864 Aase	A921 SB	Ase (also spelled "Aase") the mother of the title character in the play Peer Gynt by Norwegian poet Henrik Ibsen (1828–1906)	DMP · 864
865 Zubaida	1917 BO	Zubaida, a character in the opera Abu Hassan by Carl Maria von Weber (1786–1826)	DMP · 865
866 Fatme	1917 BQ	Fatme, a character in the opera Abu Hassan by Carl Maria von Weber (1786–1826)	DMP · 866
867 Kovacia	1917 BS	Friedrich Kovacs (1861–1931), Austrian medical doctor, who treated the wife of discoverer Johann Palisa (Src, Src)	DMP · 867
868 Lova	1917 BU	Unknown origin of name	DMP · 868
869 Mellena	1917 BV	Werner von Melle (1853–1937), mayor of Hamburg, Germany, who promoted the establishment of the University of Hamburg and founded the Hamburg Observatory	DMP · 869
870 Manto	1917 BX	Manto, mythological Greek soothsayer, erector of Apollo's oracle in Claros	DMP · 870
871 Amneris	1917 BY	Amneris, character in Verdi's opera Aida	DMP · 871
872 Holda	1917 BZ	Edward S. Holden (1846–1914), American astronomer at Lick Observatory and fifth president of the University of California	DMP · 872
873 Mechthild	1917 CA	Unknown origin of name. (Mechthild of Magdeburg?) A feminine first name in German.	DMP · 873
874 Rotraut	1917 CC	Likely named after the poem Schön Rotraut (Pretty Rotraut) by German poet Eduard Mörike (1804–1875)	DMP · 874
875 Nymphe	1917 CF	The Nymphs, Greek mythological figures	DMP · 875
876 Scott	1917 CH	Miss E. Scott, of the Society of Friends in Vienna, Austria, a friend of discoverer Johann Palisa. This minor planet has also been erroneously attributed to the English polar explorer Robert Falcon Scott	DMP · 876
877 Walküre	1915 S7	Valkyrie (German: Walküre), a female spirit in Norse mythology. Also, Die Walküre is part of Wagner's opera cycle Der Ring des Nibelungen.	DMP · 877
878 Mildred	1916 f	Mildred (1915–2016), daughter of American astronomer Harlow Shapley	DMP · 878
879 Ricarda	1917 CJ	Ricarda Huch (1864–1947), German poet	DMP · 879
880 Herba	1917 CK	Herba, Greek god of misery and poverty	DMP · 880
881 Athene	1917 CL	Athena, Greek goddess, also known as Minerva	DMP · 881
882 Swetlana	1917 CM	Unknown origin of name. A feminine first name in Russian.	DMP · 882
883 Matterania	1917 CP	August Matter, German maker of photographic plates (Matterplatten) for the Heidelberg Observatory, which allowed Max Wolf and others to make numerous discoveries. This asteroid was one of them. Matter's factory was later destroyed in World War II.	DMP · 883
884 Priamus	1917 CQ	Priam, from Greek mythology. He is the king of Troy during the Trojan War and father of Hector and Paris in Homer's Iliad.	DMP · 884
885 Ulrike	1917 CX	Ulrike von Levetzow (1804–1899), a friend and the last love of Johann Wolfgang von Goethe; alternatively: Ulrica, a character in Verdi's opera Un ballo in maschera	DMP · 885
886 Washingtonia	1917 b	George Washington (1732–1799), American general and first president of the United States of America.	DMP · 886
887 Alinda	1918 DB	The ancient city of Alinda in Caria, Asia Minor. Alternatively, Alinda is the Man in the Moon in Australian aboriginal mythology.	DMP · 887
888 Parysatis	1918 DC	Parysatis, wife of Darius II of Persia	DMP · 888
889 Erynia	1918 DG	The Erinyes, or Furies, Greek mythological creatures	DMP · 889
890 Waltraut	1918 DK	Waltraut, character in the opera Götterdämmerung in the Der Ring des Nibelungen by Richard Wagner	DMP · 890
891 Gunhild	1918 DQ	Unknown origin of name. It is a feminine German first name.	DMP · 891
892 Seeligeria	1918 DR	Hugo von Seeliger (1849–1924), Austrian-German astronomer	DMP · 892
893 Leopoldina	1918 DS	The German Academy of Sciences Leopoldina	DMP · 893
894 Erda	1918 DT	Erda, a character in Wagner's opera cycle Der Ring des Nibelungen, who is the goddess of wisdom, fate and Earth. She is based on Urðr (wisdom and fate) and Jörð (the personification of Earth) in Norse mythology.	DMP · 894
895 Helio	1918 DU	Helium, whose spectrum Paschen and Runge investigated together (Paschen named it at Wolf's request)	DMP · 895
896 Sphinx	1918 DV	The Sphinx. The female monster in Greek and Egyption mythology has the head of a woman, the haunches of a lion, and the wings of a bird. It has the habit of killing anyone who cannot answer her riddle.	DMP · 896
897 Lysistrata	1918 DZ	The anti-war comedy Lysistrata by Aristophanes	DMP · 897
898 Hildegard	1918 EA	Saint Hildegard of Bingen (1098–1179). The Benedictine abbess is considered to be the founder of scientific natural history in Germany.	DMP · 898
899 Jokaste	1918 EB	Jocasta, mother and wife of Oedipus, the mythical Greek king of Thebes	DMP · 899
900 Rosalinde	1918 EC	Rosalinde, character in the opera Die Fledermaus by Johann Strauss II (1825–1899)	DMP · 900

== 901–1000 ==
back to top

Named minor planet	Provisional	This minor planet was named for...	Ref · Catalog
901 Brunsia	1918 EE	Heinrich Bruns (1848–1919), German astronomer and director of the Leipzig Observatory (534)	DMP · 901
902 Probitas	1918 EJ	Probity, a quality attributed to the late discoverer	DMP · 902
903 Nealley	1918 EM	Nealley, amateur astronomer from New York, who contributed to the photographic star charts edition by Max Wolf and Johann Palisa (discoverer)	DMP · 903
904 Rockefellia	1918 EO	John D. Rockefeller (1839–1937), American business man, philanthropist and one of the wealthiest persons in modern history	DMP · 904
905 Universitas	1918 ES	University of Hamburg, Germany	DMP · 905
906 Repsolda	1918 ET	Johann Georg Repsold (1770–1830), German astronomer, optician and manufacturer of astrometric instruments	DMP · 906
907 Rhoda	1918 EU	Wife of American astronomer Edward Emerson Barnard (1857–1923)	DMP · 907
908 Buda	1918 EX	Buda, historic part of the city of part of Budapest, Hungary	DMP · 908
909 Ulla	1919 FA	Ulla Ahrens, member of the Ahrens family, who helped financially at the Heidelberg Observatory. Ulla's father was also a friend of the discoverer, Karl Wilhelm Reinmuth (1892–1979).	DMP · 909
910 Anneliese	1919 FB	Anneliese, a friend of German astronomer Julius Dick at Babelsberg Observatory, Germany	DMP · 910
911 Agamemnon	1919 FD	Agamemnon, from Greek mythology. The king of Mycenae commanded the Greek forces in the Trojan War.	DMP · 911
912 Maritima	1919 FJ	Maritima, annual end-of-term excursions on the North Sea organised by the University of Hamburg; also see (947).	DMP · 912
913 Otila	1919 FL	Otila, female name chosen by discoverer Karl Reinmuth from the calendar Der Lahrer hinkende Bote	DMP · 913
914 Palisana	1919 FN	Johann Palisa (1848–1925), Austrian astronomer, discoverer of minor planets, and friend of the discoverer Max Wolf	DMP · 914
915 Cosette	1918 b	Cosette, youngest daughter of French astronomer François Gonnessiat (1856–1934), who discovered this asteroid	DMP · 915
916 America	1915 S1	America, it was named after the Americas, which is why it was stated that it was named for the American continent	DMP · 916
917 Lyka	1915 S4	Lyka, a friend of the sister of the discoverer, Grigory Neujmin	DMP · 917
918 Itha	1919 FR	Itha, female name chosen by discoverer Karl Reinmuth from the calendar Der Lahrer hinkende Bote	DMP · 918
919 Ilsebill	1918 EQ	Ilsebill, a character in the fairy tale The Fisherman and his Wife by the Brothers Grimm	DMP · 919
920 Rogeria	1919 FT	Female names chosen by discoverer Karl Reinmuth from the calendar Der Lahrer hinkende Bote	DMP · 920
921 Jovita	1919 FV	Female names chosen by discoverer Karl Reinmuth from the calendar Der Lahrer hinkende Bote	DMP · 921
922 Schlutia	1919 FW	Edgar Schlubach, a German businessman from Hamburg, and Henry Frederic Tiarks, FRAS, British banker and amateur astronomer from London, who together financed the expedition to the Christmas Island to observe the solar eclipse of September 21, 1922 (Src).	DMP · 922
923 Herluga	1919 GB	Female names chosen by discoverer Karl Reinmuth from the calendar Der Lahrer hinkende Bote	DMP · 923
924 Toni	1919 GC	Female names chosen by discoverer Karl Reinmuth from the calendar Der Lahrer hinkende Bote	DMP · 924
925 Alphonsina	1920 GM	Alfonso X of Castile (1221–1284) and Alfonso XIII of Spain (1886–1941)	DMP · 925
926 Imhilde	1920 GN	Imhilde, female name chosen by discoverer Karl Reinmuth from the calendar Der Lahrer hinkende Bote	DMP · 926
927 Ratisbona	1920 GO	Latin name of the city of Regensburg in south-east Germany	DMP · 927
928 Hildrun	1920 GP	Female names chosen by discoverer Karl Reinmuth from the calendar Der Lahrer hinkende Bote	DMP · 928
929 Algunde	1920 GR	Female names chosen by discoverer Karl Reinmuth from the calendar Der Lahrer hinkende Bote	DMP · 929
930 Westphalia	1920 GS	The historic region of Westphalia in Germany, birthplace of the discoverer Walter Baade (1893–1960)	DMP · 930
931 Whittemora	1920 GU	Thomas Whittemore (1871–1950), American professor at both Harvard and Columbia Universities	DMP · 931
932 Hooveria	1920 GV	Herbert Hoover (1874–1964), American president, then secretary of state, in recognition of his help to Austria after World War I	DMP · 932
933 Susi	1927 CH	Susi, wife of Kasimir Graff (1878–1950), German astronomer at Hamburg Observatory and later director of the Vienna Observatory	DMP · 933
934 Thüringia	1920 HK	The Thüringia, an Atlantic liner of the Hamburg America Line, on which German astronomer Walter Baade travelled on his visits to New York. the captain was an amateur astronomer, and was invited to name one of Baade's asteroids.	DMP · 934
935 Clivia	1920 HM	Clivia, genus of flowering plant	DMP · 935
936 Kunigunde	1920 HN	Kunigunde, female name chosen by discoverer Karl Reinmuth from the calendar Der Lahrer hinkende Bote	DMP · 936
937 Bethgea	1920 HO	Hans Bethge (1876–1946), German poet	DMP · 937
938 Chlosinde	1920 HQ	Female names chosen by discoverer Karl Reinmuth from the calendar Der Lahrer hinkende Bote	DMP · 938
939 Isberga	1920 HR	Female names chosen by discoverer Karl Reinmuth from the calendar Der Lahrer hinkende Bote	DMP · 939
940 Kordula	1920 HT	Female names chosen by discoverer Karl Reinmuth from the calendar Der Lahrer hinkende Bote	DMP · 940
941 Murray	1920 HV	Gilbert Murray (1866–1957), British classical scholar and diplomat who helped Austria in 1920 through the League of Nations	DMP · 941
942 Romilda	1920 HW	Romilda, female name chosen by discoverer Karl Reinmuth from the calendar Der Lahrer hinkende Bote	DMP · 942
943 Begonia	1920 HX	Begonia, genus of herbs and flowers	DMP · 943
944 Hidalgo	1920 HZ	Miguel Hidalgo (1753–1811), father of the independence of Mexico, where German astronomers went to observe the solar eclipse of September 10, 1923	DMP · 944
945 Barcelona	1921 JB	Barcelona, Spain, where the discoverer was born and the asteroid discovered	DMP · 945
946 Poësia	1921 JC	Poësia, goddess of poetry	DMP · 946
947 Monterosa	1921 JD	The MV Monte Rosa, a ship (of the German Monte Klasse) used by the University of Hamburg on their outings on the North Sea; also see (912).	DMP · 947
948 Jucunda	1921 JE	Jucunda, female name chosen by discoverer Karl Reinmuth from the calendar Der Lahrer hinkende Bote	DMP · 948
949 Hel	1921 JK	Hel, Norse goddess	DMP · 949
950 Ahrensa	1921 JP	The Ahrens family, friends of the discoverer, Karl Reinmuth	DMP · 950
951 Gaspra	1916 S45	The spa town of Gaspra on the Crimean peninsula	DMP · 951
952 Caia	1916 S61	Caia, a character in the novel Quo Vadis by Henryk Sienkiewicz	DMP · 952
953 Painleva	1921 JT	Paul Painlevé (1863–1933), French mathematician and politician	DMP · 953
954 Li	1921 JU	Lina Alstede Reinmuth, wife of discoverer Karl Reinmuth	DMP · 954
955 Alstede	1921 JV	Lina Alstede Reinmuth, wife of discoverer Karl Reinmuth	DMP · 955
956 Elisa	1921 JW	Elisa Reinmuth, mother of discoverer Karl Reinmuth	DMP · 956
957 Camelia	1921 JX	Camellia, genus of flowering plants	DMP · 957
958 Asplinda	1921 KC	Bror Ansgar Asplind (1890–1954), Swedish astronomer	DMP · 958
959 Arne	1921 KF	Arne Asplind, son of Swedish astronomer Bror Asplind, also see (958)	DMP · 959
960 Birgit	1921 KH	Birgit Asplind, daughter of Swedish astronomer Bror Asplind, also see (958)	DMP · 960
961 Gunnie	1921 KM	Gunnie Asplind, daughter of Swedish astronomer Bror Asplind, also see (958)	DMP · 961
962 Aslög	1921 KP	Aslög, mythological Norse woman	DMP · 962
963 Iduberga	1921 KR	Iduberga, female name chosen by discoverer Karl Reinmuth from the calendar Der Lahrer hinkende Bote	DMP · 963
964 Subamara	1921 KS	Latin for 'very bitter' (referring to the observing conditions at the Vienna Observatory)	DMP · 964
965 Angelica	1921 KT	Angelica Hartmann, wife of the discoverer, Johannes Franz Hartmann (1865–1936)	DMP · 965
966 Muschi	1921 KU	German: Muschi (meaning "Kitty"), nickname of Walter Baade's wife, who discovered this asteroid	DMP · 966
967 Helionape	1921 KV	Adolf von Sonnenthal (1834–1909), an Austrian actor. Helionape is the direct Greek translation of his name (Sonne and Tal, to helio and nape).	DMP · 967
968 Petunia	1921 KW	Petunia, a genus of flowering plants	DMP · 968
969 Leocadia	1921 KZ	Unknown origin of name. Feminine Russian first name.	DMP · 969
970 Primula	1921 LB	The flower genus Primula (primroses)	DMP · 970
971 Alsatia	1921 LF	Alsace, region in eastern France. Originally named "Alsace" by French discoverer Alexandre Schaumasse (1882–1958), in 1920, the name was later changed to "Alsatia" by the German ARI.	DMP · 971
972 Cohnia	1922 LK	Fritz Cohn (1866–1922), German astronomer and director of the Astronomisches Rechen-Institut in Berlin	DMP · 972
973 Aralia	1922 LR	Aralia, genus of ivy-like plant	DMP · 973
974 Lioba	1922 LS	Saint Leoba (or Lioba; c. 710–782), abbess in Tauberbischofsheim, Germany, who helped Saint Boniface spreading Christianity throughout Germany.	DMP · 974
975 Perseverantia	1922 LT	Perseverance	DMP · 975
976 Benjamina	1922 LU	Benjamin, son of discoverer Benjamin Jekhowsky	DMP · 976
977 Philippa	1922 LV	Baron Philippe de Rothschild (1902–1988), French financier	DMP · 977
978 Aidamina	1922 LY	Aida Minaievna, a friend of the family of Soviet discoverer Sergey Belyavsky	DMP · 978
979 Ilsewa	1922 MC	Ilse Waldorf, an acquaintance of German discoverer Karl Reinmuth	DMP · 979
980 Anacostia	1921 W19	The historic district of Anacostia in Washington, D.C., United States, as well as for the nearby Anacostia River	DMP · 980
981 Martina	1917 S92	Henri Martin (1810–1883), French historian and politician	DMP · 981
982 Franklina	1922 MD	John Franklin-Adams (1843–1912), British amateur astronomer and stellar cartographer	DMP · 982
983 Gunila	1922 ME	Gunila, female name chosen by discoverer Karl Reinmuth from the calendar Der Lahrer hinkende Bote	DMP · 983
984 Gretia	1922 MH	Gretia, sister-in-law of German astronomer Albrecht Kahrstedt (1897–1971), also see (1587)	DMP · 984
985 Rosina	1922 MO	Rosina, female name chosen by discoverer Karl Reinmuth from the calendar Der Lahrer hinkende Bote	DMP · 985
986 Amelia	1922 MQ	Amelia, wife of discoverer Josep Comas i Solà	DMP · 986
987 Wallia	1922 MR	Wallia, female name chosen by discoverer Karl Reinmuth from the calendar Der Lahrer hinkende Bote	DMP · 987
988 Appella	1922 MT	Paul Émile Appell (1855–1930), French astronomer	DMP · 988
989 Schwassmannia	1922 MW	Arnold Schwassmann (1870–1964), German astronomer, discoverer of minor planets and comets at Potsdam-Babelsberg and Hamburg-Bergedorf observatories	DMP · 989
990 Yerkes	1922 MZ	Yerkes Observatory, in Williams Bay, Wisconsin, United States, where this asteroid was discovered	DMP · 990
991 McDonalda	1922 NB	McDonald Observatory, Texas, United States, originally endowed by the Texas banker William Johnson McDonald	DMP · 991
992 Swasey	1922 ND	Ambrose Swasey (1846–1937), American benefactor and mechanical engineer, co-founder, with Worcester Reed Warner of the Warner & Swasey Company which manufactured astronomical telescopes and precision instruments, including the 82-inch Otto Struve Telescope for the McDonald Observatory, one of the largest telescopes at the time. They gave their own observatory to Case Western University and it took the name Warner and Swasey Observatory.	DMP · 992
993 Moultona	1923 NJ	Forest Ray Moulton (1872–1952), American astronomer and mathematician	DMP · 993
994 Otthild	1923 NL	Otthild, female name chosen by discoverer Karl Reinmuth from the calendar Der Lahrer hinkende Bote	DMP · 994
995 Sternberga	1923 NP	Pavel Shternberg (1865–1920), Russian astronomer	DMP · 995
996 Hilaritas	1923 NM	Contentedness	DMP · 996
997 Priska	1923 NR	Priska, female name chosen by discoverer Karl Reinmuth from the calendar Der Lahrer hinkende Bote	DMP · 997
998 Bodea	1923 NU	Johann Elert Bode (1747–1826), German astronomer, author of the Berliner Astronomisches Jahrbuch, known for the empirical Titius–Bode law about the sequence of planetary distances	DMP · 998
999 Zachia	1923 NW	Franz Xaver von Zach (1754–1832), Hungarian astronomer and director of the Seeberg Observatory (279) in Germany	DMP · 999
1000 Piazzia	1923 NZ	Giuseppe Piazzi (1746–1826), Italian astronomer and discoverer of Ceres in 1801	DMP · 1000

back to top

Preceded by —	Meanings of minor-planet names List of minor planets: 1–1,000	Succeeded by 1,001–2,000
