= 733 Mocia =

Main-belt asteroid

Discovery
- Discovered by: Max Wolf
- Discovery site: Heidelberg
- Discovery date: 16 September 1912

Designations
- Alternative designations: 1912 PF

Orbital characteristics
- Epoch 31 July 2016 (JD 2457600.5)
- Uncertainty parameter 0
- Observation arc: 107.15 yr (39135 d)
- Aphelion: 3.5997 AU (538.51 Gm)
- Perihelion: 3.1941 AU (477.83 Gm)
- Semi-major axis: 3.3969 AU (508.17 Gm)
- Eccentricity: 0.059701
- Orbital period (sidereal): 6.26 yr (2286.8 d)
- Mean anomaly: 58.5163°
- Mean motion: 0° 9^{m} 26.712^{s} / day
- Inclination: 20.294°
- Longitude of ascending node: 341.005°
- Argument of perihelion: 189.934°

Physical characteristics
- Mean radius: 44.355±3.45 km
- Synodic rotation period: 11.374 h (0.4739 d)
- Geometric albedo: 0.0539±0.009
- Absolute magnitude (H): 9.05

733 Mocia is a minor planet orbiting the Sun. A possible occultation was observed by Oscar Canales Moreno on October 1, 2001.

== See also ==
- List of minor planets/701–800
- Meanings of minor planet names: 501–1000
