= 862 Franzia =

Stony background asteroid

Discovery
- Discovered by: M. F. Wolf
- Discovery site: Heidelberg Obs.
- Discovery date: 28 January 1917

Designations
- Named after: Franz Wolf (son of the discoverer)
- Alternative designations: A917 BG · 1948 TT_{1} 1949 YT · A903 BA; 1917 BF
- Minor planet category: main-belt · (middle) background

Orbital characteristics
- Epoch 31 May 2020 (JD 2459000.5)
- Uncertainty parameter 0
- Observation arc: 117.04 yr (42,749 d)
- Aphelion: 3.0345 AU
- Perihelion: 2.5732 AU
- Semi-major axis: 2.8038 AU
- Eccentricity: 0.0823
- Orbital period (sidereal): 4.70 yr (1,715 d)
- Mean anomaly: 53.871°
- Mean motion: 0° 12^{m} 35.64^{s} / day
- Inclination: 13.887°
- Longitude of ascending node: 300.01°
- Argument of perihelion: 120.97°

Physical characteristics
- Mean diameter: 27.033±0.847 km; 27.26±1.4 km; 28.59±0.91 km
- Synodic rotation period: 7.5236±0.0006 h
- Geometric albedo: 0.125±0.009; 0.1368±0.015; 0.291±0.033
- Spectral type: SMASS = S
- Absolute magnitude (H): 9.80

862 Franzia (prov. designation: A917 BG or 1917 BF) is a stony background asteroid from the central regions of the asteroid belt. It was discovered by German astronomer Max Wolf at the Heidelberg-Königstuhl State Observatory on 28 January 1917. The common S-type asteroid has a rotation period of 7.5 hours and measures approximately 28 kilometers (17 miles) in diameter. It was named after the discoverer's son, Franz Wolf.

== Orbit and classification ==
Franzia is a non-family asteroid of the main belt's background population when applying the hierarchical clustering method to its proper orbital elements. It orbits the Sun in the central asteroid belt at a distance of 2.6–3.0 AU once every 4 years and 8 months (1,715 days; semi-major axis of 2.8 AU). Its orbit has an eccentricity of 0.08 and an inclination of 14° with respect to the ecliptic. The body's observation arc begins with one of its first observations as A903 BA at Heidelberg Observatory on 22 January 1903, or 14 years prior to its official discovery observation.

== Naming ==
This minor planet was named in honor of Franz Wolf, son of the discoverer Max Wolf. The naming was also mentioned in The Names of the Minor Planets by Paul Herget in 1955 (H 84). It also honors the discoverer's father, Franz Wolf, a physician and amateur astronomer who fostered his son's interest in astronomy by setting up a small observatory in the backyard when Max was sixteen.

== Physical characteristics ==
In the Bus–Binzel SMASS classification, Franzia is a common, stony S-type asteroid.

=== Rotation period ===
Over the last two decades, numerous photometric observations of Franzia have been proven challenging to determine a well defined rotation period. In August 2018, a rotational lightcurve was obtained from observations by Christophe Demeautis and Raoul Behrend. Lightcurve analysis gave a period of 7.5236±0.0006 hours with a brightness variation of 0.12±0.01 magnitude (U=3−). This result supersedes previous observations.

Based on observations taken in September 2004, Brian Warner at his Palmer Divide Observatory (716), Colorado, published an ambiguous period of 7.65±0.01 and 15.05±0.02 hours with an amplitude of 0.10 and 0.12 magnitude, respectively, depending on whether the period solution is derived from a monomodal or from a bimodal lightcurve (U=2/2). Alternatively, Warner also gave a revised period of 7.52±0.01 hours and an amplitude of 0.13±0.01 magnitude for his other observation taken in December 2000. (Note: Lightcurve plot of (862) Franzia , Palmer Divide Observatory, B. D. Warner (2004). Rotation period shown on plot: 7.65±0.01 hours with a brightness amplitude of 0.10±0.01 mag. Quality code is 2. Summary figures the LCDB.)

In February 2011, James W. Brinsfield at the Via Capote Observatory (G69) in California measured a period of 5.014±0.001 hours with an amplitude of 0.10±0.03 magnitude (U=2). Observations by Nicolas Esseiva and Raoul Behrend in December 2014 gave a tentative period of 7.52±0.05 hours and a weak amplitude of 0.07±00.01 magnitude (U=2). A basically identical period of 7.52±0.05 hours with a brightness variation of 0.08±0.01 magnitude was determined by French amateur astronomer René Roy in February 2011 (U=2−). In March 2016, the Spanish group of asteroid observers, OBAS, measures a period of 16.299±0.013 hours with an amplitude of 0.10±0.01 magnitude (U=2).

=== Diameter and albedo ===
According to the surveys carried out by the NEOWISE mission of NASA's Wide-field Infrared Survey Explorer, the Infrared Astronomical Satellite IRAS, and the Japanese Akari satellite, Franzia measures (27.033±0.847), (27.26±1.4) and (28.59±0.91) kilometers in diameter and its surface has an albedo of (0.291±0.033), (0.1368±0.015) and (0.125±0.009), respectively. The Collaborative Asteroid Lightcurve Link derives an albedo of 0.2700 and a diameter of 28.05 kilometers based on an absolute magnitude of 9.8.
