= 462 Eriphyla =

Main-belt asteroid

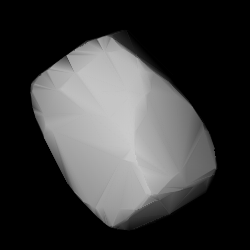
- Modelled shape of Eriphyla from its lightcurve

Discovery
- Discovered by: M. F. Wolf
- Discovery site: Heidelberg Obs.
- Discovery date: 22 October 1900

Designations
- Pronunciation: /ɛrɪˈfaɪlə/
- Named after: Eriphyle (Greek mythology)
- Alternative designations: A900 UJ · 1927 CP; 1946 DB · 1948 OG; 1951 EA_{3} · 1957 KB; 1958 RR · 1959 WB; A896 YA · A907 BB; 1900 FQ
- Minor planet category: main-belt · (outer); Koronis

Orbital characteristics
- Epoch 31 May 2020 (JD 2459000.5)
- Uncertainty parameter 0
- Observation arc: 119.28 yr (43,567 d)
- Aphelion: 3.1252 AU
- Perihelion: 2.6181 AU
- Semi-major axis: 2.8717 AU
- Eccentricity: 0.0883
- Orbital period (sidereal): 4.87 yr (1,777 d)
- Mean anomaly: 224.51°
- Mean motion: 0° 12^{m} 9^{s} / day
- Inclination: 3.1927°
- Longitude of ascending node: 105.28°
- Argument of perihelion: 251.08°

Physical characteristics
- Mean diameter: 34.274±0.221 km; 35.63±1.4 km; 39.22±0.49 km
- Synodic rotation period: 8.659±0.001 h
- Pole ecliptic latitude: (119.0°, 7.0°) (λ_{1}/β_{1}); (301.0°, 5.0°) (λ_{2}/β_{2})
- Geometric albedo: 0.239±0.007; 0.259±0.063; 0.2829±0.023
- Spectral type: Tholen = S; SMASS = S; B–V = 0.834±0.041; U–B = 0.421±0.030
- Absolute magnitude (H): 9.4

462 Eriphyla /ɛrɪˈfaɪlə/ (prov. designation: A900 UJ or 1900 FQ) is a Koronian asteroid from the outer regions of the asteroid belt. It was discovered by German astronomer Max Wolf at the Heidelberg-Königstuhl State Observatory on 22 October 1900. The stony S-type asteroid has a rotation period of 8.7 hours and measures approximately 35 kilometers (22 miles) in diameter. It was named after Eriphyle, from Greek mythology.

== Orbit and classification ==
Eriphyla is a core member of the Koronis family (605), a very large outer asteroid family with nearly co-planar ecliptical orbits. It orbits the Sun in the outer asteroid belt at a distance of 2.6–3.1 AU once every 4 years and 10 months (1,777 days; semi-major axis of 2.87 AU). Its orbit has an eccentricity of 0.09 and an inclination of 3° with respect to the ecliptic. The asteroid was first observed as A896 YA at Nice Observatory on 31 December 1896. The body's observation arc begins at Heidelberg on 11 November 1900, three weeks after its official discovery observation.

== Naming ==
This minor planet was named from Greek mythology after Eriphyle, wife of Amphiaraus whom she persuaded to take part in a raiding venture which lead to the tragic war of the Seven against Thebes. The naming was also mentioned in The Names of the Minor Planets by Paul Herget in 1955 (H 50).

== Physical characteristics ==
In both the Tholen and SMASS classification, Eriphyla is a common stony S-type asteroid.

=== Rotation period ===
In October 2002, a rotational lightcurve of Eriphyla was obtained from photometric observations by Stephen M. Slivan. Lightcurve analysis gave a well-defined rotation period of 8.659±0.001 hours with a brightness variation of 0.222±0.022 magnitude (U=3). Several more lightcurves were published since 1987.

A modeled lightcurve using photometric data from the Lowell Photometric Database and from the Wide-field Infrared Survey Explorer (WISE) was published in 2018. It gave a concurring sidereal period of 8.65890±0.00002 hours and includes two spin axes at (119.0°, 7.0°) and (301.0°, 5.0°) in ecliptic coordinates (λ, β).

=== Diameter and albedo ===
According to the surveys carried out by the Infrared Astronomical Satellite IRAS, the Japanese Akari satellite and the NEOWISE mission of NASA's WISE telescope, Eriphyla measures between 34.274 and 41.882 kilometers in diameter and its surface has an albedo between 0.1746 and 0.2829. The Collaborative Asteroid Lightcurve Link assumes an albedo of 0.2438 and derives a diameter of 35.32 kilometers based on an absolute magnitude of 9.41.
