= 896 Sphinx =

Main-belt asteroid

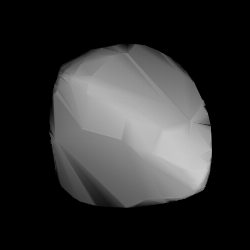
- Modelled shape of Sphinx from its lightcurve

Discovery
- Discovered by: M. F. Wolf
- Discovery site: Heidelberg Obs.
- Discovery date: 1 August 1918

Designations
- Pronunciation: /ˈsfɪŋks/
- Named after: Sphinx; (Greek/Egyptian mythology)
- Alternative designations: A918 PE · 1918 DV
- Minor planet category: main-belt · (inner); background
- Adjectives: Sphinxian /ˈsfɪŋksiən/

Orbital characteristics
- Epoch 31 May 2020 (JD 2459000.5)
- Uncertainty parameter 0
- Observation arc: 101.50 yr (37,074 d)
- Aphelion: 2.6588 AU
- Perihelion: 1.9128 AU
- Semi-major axis: 2.2858 AU
- Eccentricity: 0.1632
- Orbital period (sidereal): 3.46 yr (1,262 d)
- Mean anomaly: 211.73°
- Mean motion: 0° 17^{m} 6.72^{s} / day
- Inclination: 8.1903°
- Longitude of ascending node: 254.18°
- Argument of perihelion: 1.9628°

Physical characteristics
- Mean diameter: 11.974±0.071 km; 13.07±0.5 km; 14.45±0.35 km
- Synodic rotation period: 21.038±0.008 h
- Pole ecliptic latitude: (172.0°, 20.0°) (λ_{1}/β_{1}); (352.0°, 42.0°) (λ_{2}/β_{2})
- Geometric albedo: 0.163±0.009; 0.1971±0.017; 0.242±0.045
- Spectral type: n.a.
- Absolute magnitude (H): 11.6

896 Sphinx /ˈsfɪŋks/ is a background asteroid from the inner regions of the asteroid belt, that measures approximately 13 kilometers (8 miles) in diameter. It was discovered on 1 August 1918, by astronomer Max Wolf at the Heidelberg-Königstuhl State Observatory in southwest Germany. The asteroid has a rotation period of 21.0 hours and is one of few low-numbered objects for which no spectral type has been determined. It was named after the Sphinx, a creature from Greek and Egyptian mythology.

== Orbit and classification ==
Sphinx is a non-family asteroid of the main belt's background population when applying the hierarchical clustering method to its proper orbital elements. It orbits the Sun in the inner asteroid belt at a distance of 1.9–2.7 AU once every 3 years and 6 months (1,262 days; semi-major axis of 2.29 AU). Its orbit has an eccentricity of 0.16 and an inclination of 8° with respect to the ecliptic. The body's observation arc begins at Heidelberg Observatory on 9 October 1918, two months after its official discovery observation.

== Naming ==
This minor planet was named after the Sphinx, a legendary creature from Greek and Egyptian mythology. The female monster has the head of a woman, the haunches of a lion, and the wings of a bird. It has the habit of killing anyone who cannot answer her riddle. The naming citation was mentioned in The Names of the Minor Planets by Paul Herget in 1955 (H 87).

== Physical characteristics ==
Contrary to most other low-numbered asteroids, no spectral type has been determined. Based on its relatively high albedo (see below) and its location within the inner parts of the main-belt, Sphinx may possibly be a common, stony S-type asteroid.

=== Rotation period ===
In June 2018, a rotational lightcurve of Sphinx was obtained from photometric observations by Tom Polakis at the Command Module Observatory (V02) in Arizona. Lightcurve analysis gave a rotation period of 21.038±0.008 hours with a brightness variation of 0.16±0.02 magnitude (U=2+). However, an alternative period solution of 10.541±0.003 hours with an amplitude of 0.17±0.02 magnitude is also possible. Both results supersede a tentative period determination by Laurent Bernasconi from September 2001 (U=1).

A modeled lightcurve using photometric data from the Lowell Photometric Database and from the Wide-field Infrared Survey Explorer (WISE) was published in 2018. It gave a divergent sidereal period of 12.95209±0.00002 hours and includes two spin axes at (172.0°, 20.0°) and (352.0°, 42.0°) in ecliptic coordinates (λ, β).

=== Diameter and albedo ===
According to the surveys carried out by the NEOWISE mission of NASA's WISE telescope, the Infrared Astronomical Satellite IRAS, and the Japanese Akari satellite, Sphinx measures (11.974±0.071), (13.07±0.5) and (14.45±0.35) kilometers in diameter and its surface has an albedo of (0.242±0.045), (0.1971±0.017) and (0.163±0.009), respectively. The Collaborative Asteroid Lightcurve Link derives an albedo of 0.2332 and a diameter of 13.17 kilometers based on an absolute magnitude of 11.6. Alternative mean diameter measurements published by the WISE team include (12.59±2.11 km), (13.320±0.122 km) and (13.658±3.101 km) with corresponding albedos of (0.25±0.11), (0.1924±0.0127) and (0.241±0.080).
