= 561 Ingwelde =

Main-belt asteroid

Discovery
- Discovered by: M. F. Wolf
- Discovery site: Heidelberg
- Discovery date: 26 March 1905

Designations
- Pronunciation: German: [ˈɪŋvɛldə]
- Alternative designations: 1905 QG

Orbital characteristics
- Epoch 31 July 2016 (JD 2457600.5)
- Uncertainty parameter 0
- Observation arc: 110.90 yr (40505 d)
- Aphelion: 3.5428 AU (530.00 Gm)
- Perihelion: 2.8069 AU (419.91 Gm)
- Semi-major axis: 3.1748 AU (474.94 Gm)
- Eccentricity: 0.11589
- Orbital period (sidereal): 5.66 yr (2066.2 d)
- Mean anomaly: 326.466°
- Mean motion: 0° 10^{m} 27.228^{s} / day
- Inclination: 1.5440°
- Longitude of ascending node: 159.502°
- Argument of perihelion: 315.780°

Physical characteristics
- Mean radius: 12.25±0.8 km
- Synodic rotation period: 12.012 h (0.5005 d)
- Geometric albedo: 0.0966±0.014
- Absolute magnitude (H): 11.21

561 Ingwelde is a Themistian asteroid. In light of Max Wolf's practice ca. 1905 of naming his discoveries after operatic heroines, it is most likely named after the title character of Ingwelde, an opera by Max von Schillings premiered in Karlsruhe in 1894.
