= 678 Fredegundis =

Asteroid orbiting the Sun

Discovery
- Discovered by: W. Lorenz
- Discovery site: Heidelberg
- Discovery date: 22 January 1909

Designations
- Alternative designations: 1909 FS

Orbital characteristics
- Epoch 31 July 2016 (JD 2457600.5)
- Uncertainty parameter 0
- Observation arc: 103.26 yr (37,715 d)
- Aphelion: 3.1352 AU (469.02 Gm)
- Perihelion: 2.0122 AU (301.02 Gm)
- Semi-major axis: 2.5737 AU (385.02 Gm)
- Eccentricity: 0.21817
- Orbital period (sidereal): 4.13 yr (1,508.1 d)
- Mean anomaly: 73.755°
- Mean motion: 0° 14^{m} 19.356^{s} / day
- Inclination: 6.0824°
- Longitude of ascending node: 281.416°
- Argument of perihelion: 120.267°

Physical characteristics
- Mean diameter: 42 ± 3 km (composite estimate)
- Mass: (2.55±0.90)×10^{17} kg (Note: Calculated from its standard gravitational parameter GM = 0.017±0.006 km^{3}/s^{2}.)
- Mean density: 7.76 g/cm^{3} (Note: Assuming a diameter of 39.6 km.)
- Synodic rotation period: 11.61624 h (0.484010 d)
- Geometric albedo: 0.25 ± 0.02 (composite estimate)
- Absolute magnitude (H): 9.02

678 Fredegundis is a minor planet orbiting the Sun. It was discovered 22 January 1909 from Heidelberg by German astronomer K. Wilhelm Lorenz, and was named after the French opera Frédégonde. This object is orbiting at a distance of 2.57 AU with a period of 4.13 years and an eccentricity (ovalness) of 0.22. The orbital plane is inclined at an angle of 6.1° to the plane of the ecliptic

This appears to be an M-type asteroid in the Tholen classification and X-type in the Bus and Binzel system. It spans a girth of approximately 42 km and is spinning with a rotation period of 11.6201 hours. Radar observations suggest a bifurcated structure consistent with a contact binary.
