= 274 Philagoria =

Main-belt asteroid

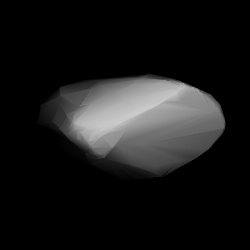
- Shape of Philagoria from modeled lightcurve

Discovery
- Discovered by: Johann Palisa
- Discovery date: 3 April 1888

Designations
- Pronunciation: /fɪləˈɡɔːriə/
- Named after: Philagoria, a club in Olomouc
- Alternative designations: A888 GA
- Minor planet category: Main belt

Orbital characteristics
- Epoch 31 July 2016 (JD 2457600.5)
- Uncertainty parameter 0
- Observation arc: 123.04 yr (44940 d)
- Aphelion: 3.40817 AU (509.855 Gm)
- Perihelion: 2.67875 AU (400.735 Gm)
- Semi-major axis: 3.04346 AU (455.295 Gm)
- Eccentricity: 0.11983
- Orbital period (sidereal): 5.31 yr (1939.3 d)
- Mean anomaly: 45.5293°
- Mean motion: 0° 11^{m} 8.275^{s} / day
- Inclination: 3.67769°
- Longitude of ascending node: 92.8085°
- Argument of perihelion: 119.376°

Physical characteristics
- Dimensions: 26.57±2.4 km
- Synodic rotation period: 17.938 h (0.7474 d)
- Geometric albedo: 0.2282±0.047
- Absolute magnitude (H): 10.0

274 Philagoria is a typical Main belt asteroid. It was discovered by Johann Palisa on 3 April 1888 in Vienna. He named it for Philagoria, a club in Olomouc.
