= 686 Gersuind =

Main-belt asteroid

Discovery
- Discovered by: August Kopff
- Discovery site: Heidelberg
- Discovery date: 15 August 1909

Designations
- Alternative designations: 1909 HF
- Minor planet category: main-belt · (middle); Gersuind

Orbital characteristics
- Epoch 31 July 2016 (JD 2457600.5)
- Uncertainty parameter 0
- Observation arc: 106.67 yr (38960 d)
- Aphelion: 3.2844 AU (491.34 Gm)
- Perihelion: 1.8987 AU (284.04 Gm)
- Semi-major axis: 2.5915 AU (387.68 Gm)
- Eccentricity: 0.26736
- Orbital period (sidereal): 4.17 yr (1523.8 d)
- Mean anomaly: 236.17°
- Mean motion: 0° 14^{m} 10.5^{s} / day
- Inclination: 15.672°
- Longitude of ascending node: 243.103°
- Argument of perihelion: 88.883°

Physical characteristics
- Mean radius: 20.565±2.25 km
- Synodic rotation period: 6.3127 h (0.26303 d)
- Geometric albedo: 0.1416±0.037
- Absolute magnitude (H): 9.67

686 Gersuind is a minor planet orbiting the Sun that was discovered by German astronomer August Kopff on 15 August 1909 from Heidelberg. It was named after a character in Gerhart Hauptmann's play Gersuind.

This object is the namesake of a family of 40–207 asteroids that share similar spectral properties and orbital elements; hence they may have arisen from the same collisional event. All members have a relatively high orbital inclination.
