= 568 Cheruskia =

Minor planet (asteroid) orbiting in the asteroid belt

Discovery
- Discovered by: Paul Götz
- Discovery site: Heidelberg
- Discovery date: 26 July 1905

Designations
- Pronunciation: /kɛˈrʌskiə/, German: [çeːˈʁʊskiaː]
- Alternative designations: 1905 QS

Orbital characteristics
- Epoch 31 July 2016 (JD 2457600.5)
- Uncertainty parameter 0
- Observation arc: 109.28 yr (39913 d)
- Aphelion: 3.3652 AU (503.43 Gm)
- Perihelion: 2.3978 AU (358.71 Gm)
- Semi-major axis: 2.8815 AU (431.07 Gm)
- Eccentricity: 0.16787
- Orbital period (sidereal): 4.89 yr (1786.6 d)
- Mean anomaly: 164.09°
- Mean motion: 0° 12^{m} 5.4^{s} / day
- Inclination: 18.392°
- Longitude of ascending node: 249.791°
- Argument of perihelion: 174.386°

Physical characteristics
- Mean radius: 43.495±0.9 km
- Mass: (6.0±6.0)×10^{17} kg (Note: Calculated from its standard gravitational parameter GM = 0.04±0.04 km^{3}/s^{2}.) (SB441)
- Mean density: 1.7±1.7 g/cm^{3} (calculated)
- Synodic rotation period: 13.209 h (0.5504 d)
- Geometric albedo: 0.0535±0.002
- Absolute magnitude (H): 9.5

568 Cheruskia is a minor planet, specifically an asteroid orbiting in the asteroid belt that was discovered by German astronomer Paul Götz on 26 July 1905 from Heidelberg.

Photometric observations of this asteroid at the Palmer Divide Observatory in Colorado Springs, Colorado, during 2008 gave a light curve with a period of 13.209 ± 0.001 hours and a brightness variation of 0.10 ± 0.01 in magnitude. This is in disagreement with a previous study reported in 2000 that gave a period estimate of 14.654 hours.
