= 3787 Aivazovskij =

Main-belt asteroid

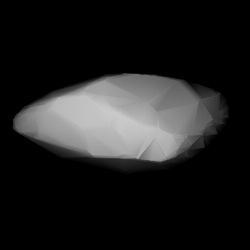
- Shape model of Aivazovskij from its lightcurve

Discovery
- Discovered by: N. Chernykh
- Discovery site: Crimean Astrophysical Obs.
- Discovery date: 11 September 1977

Designations
- Named after: Ivan Aivazovsky (painter)
- Alternative designations: 1977 RG_{7} · 1931 DM; 1967 RO · 1987 UA_{3}
- Minor planet category: main-belt · (outer); Itha

Orbital characteristics
- Epoch 4 September 2017 (JD 2458000.5)
- Uncertainty parameter 0
- Observation arc: 86.11 yr (31,452 days)
- Aphelion: 3.2220 AU
- Perihelion: 2.4819 AU
- Semi-major axis: 2.8519 AU
- Eccentricity: 0.1298
- Orbital period (sidereal): 4.82 yr (1,759 days)
- Mean anomaly: 6.3381°
- Mean motion: 0° 12^{m} 16.56^{s} / day
- Inclination: 12.055°
- Longitude of ascending node: 185.88°
- Argument of perihelion: 305.66°

Physical characteristics
- Mean diameter: 12.089±0.121 km 14.89 km (calculated)
- Synodic rotation period: 2.97
- Geometric albedo: 0.20 (assumed); 0.333±0.070
- Spectral type: S
- Absolute magnitude (H): 11.4 · 11.488±0.002 (R) · 11.5 · 11.55±0.51

3787 Aivazovskij (prov. designation: 1977 RG_{7}) is a stony asteroid of the Itha family, located in the outer region of the asteroid belt. It was discovered by Soviet–Russian astronomer Nikolai Chernykh at the Crimean Astrophysical Observatory in Nauchnyj, on the Crimean peninsula, on 11 September 1977. The stony S-type asteroid has a rotation period of 3.0 hours and measures approximately 13 kilometers (8.1 miles) in diameter. It was named after painter Ivan Aivazovsky (1817–1900).

== Orbit and classification ==
When applying the hierarchical clustering method to its proper orbital elements, Aivazovskij is a member of the Itha family, a very small family of asteroids, named after its parent body 918 Itha. It orbits the Sun in the outer main belt at a distance of 2.5–3.2 AU once every 4 years and 10 months (1,759 days; semi-major axis of 2.85 AU). Its orbit has an eccentricity of 0.13 and an inclination of 12° with respect to the ecliptic. The first precovery was taken at Lowell Observatory in 1931, extending the asteroid's observation arc by 46 years prior to its discovery.

== Naming ==
This minor planet was named after the Armenian-Russian painter of seascapes, Ivan Aivazovsky (1817–1900), who lived and worked in the Crimean city of Feodosia. The minor planet 1048 Feodosia is named after this place. The official naming citation was published by the Minor Planet Center on 1 September 1993 (M.P.C. 22499).

== Physical characteristics ==
The asteroid has been characterized as a stony S-type asteroid by PanSTARRS' photometric survey. This concurs with the overall spectral type for the Itha family.

=== Rotation period ===
A rotational lightcurve of Aivazovskij was obtained from photometric observations made in March 2008, at the Universidad de Monterry Observatory, Mexico. It showed a well-defined rotation period of 2.97 hours with a brightness amplitude of 0.18 in magnitude (U=3). Two additional observations gave a period of 2.9532±0.0005 and 2.980807±0.000005 hours, respectively (U=2/n.a.).

=== Diameter and albedo ===
Based on the survey carried out by the NEOWISE mission of NASA's space-based Wide-field Infrared Survey Explorer, the asteroid measure 12.1 kilometers in diameter and its surface has a high albedo of 0.33, while the Collaborative Asteroid Lightcurve Link assumes a standard albedo for stony asteroids of 0.20, and calculates a diameter 14.9 kilometers with an absolute magnitude of 11.5.
