= 968 Petunia =

Main-belt asteroid

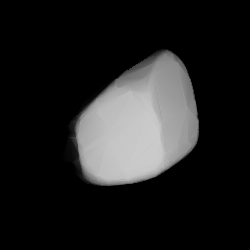
- Modelled shape of Petunia from its lightcurve

Discovery
- Discovered by: K. Reinmuth
- Discovery site: Heidelberg Obs.
- Discovery date: 24 November 1921

Designations
- Pronunciation: /pɪˈtjuːniə/
- Named after: Petunia (genus of flowers)
- Alternative designations: A921 WJ · 1935 QK_{1} 1948 KC · 1921 KW
- Minor planet category: main-belt · (outer); Itha

Orbital characteristics
- Epoch 31 May 2020 (JD 2459000.5)
- Uncertainty parameter 0
- Observation arc: 98.19 yr (35,865 d)
- Aphelion: 3.2572 AU
- Perihelion: 2.4741 AU
- Semi-major axis: 2.8657 AU
- Eccentricity: 0.1366
- Orbital period (sidereal): 4.85 yr (1,772 d)
- Mean anomaly: 15.803°
- Mean motion: 0° 12^{m} 11.52^{s} / day
- Inclination: 11.598°
- Longitude of ascending node: 208.84°
- Argument of perihelion: 297.54°

Physical characteristics
- Mean diameter: 24.422±0.232 km; 27.77±2.9 km; 29.51±0.49 km
- Synodic rotation period: 61.280±0.005 h
- Pole ecliptic latitude: (355.0°, −78.0°) (λ_{1}/β_{1})
- Geometric albedo: 0.233±0.021; 0.1803±0.045; 0.204±0.008
- Spectral type: Tholen = S; S (SDSS-MOC); S (S3OS2-TH); Sl (S3OS2-BB); B–V = 0.869±0.020; U–B = 0.372±0.082
- Absolute magnitude (H): 10.2

968 Petunia (prov. designation: A921 WJ or 1921 KW), is a stony asteroid of the Itha family, approximately 28 kilometers (17 miles) in diameter, located in the outer region of the asteroid belt. It was discovered on 24 November 1921, by astronomer Karl Reinmuth at the Heidelberg Observatory in southern Germany. The bright S-type asteroid has a long rotation period of 61.3 hours. It was named after the genus of flowering plants, Petunia.

== Orbit and classification ==
When applying the synthetic hierarchical clustering method (HCM) by Nesvorný, Petunia is a member of the Itha family (633), a small family of stony asteroids in the outer main belt, named after 918 Itha. However, it is a background asteroid according to another HCM-analysis by Milani and Knežević (AstDys). Petunia orbits the Sun at a distance of 2.5–3.3 AU once every 4 years and 10 months (1,772 days; semi-major axis of 2.87 AU). Its orbit has an eccentricity of 0.14 and an inclination of 12° with respect to the ecliptic. The asteroid was first observed at Heidelberg Observatory on 25 October 1921, where the body's observation arc begins with its official discovery observation one month later on 24 November 1921.

== Naming ==
This minor planet was named after a genus of tropical American herbs, Petunia. This genus of flowering plants belongs to the family of Solanaceae (nightshades) and shows funnel-shaped corollas. The naming was mentioned in The Names of the Minor Planets by Paul Herget in 1955 (H 93). Only a minority of minor planets are after animals and plants.

== Physical characteristics ==
Petunia is a common stony S-type asteroid in the Tholen classification, in the SDSS-based taxonomy, as well as in the Tholen-like taxonomy of the Small Solar System Objects Spectroscopic Survey (S3OS2), while in the SMASS-like taxonomic variant of the S3OS2 survey, it is an Sl subtype, which transitions from the S-type to the L-type asteroids.

=== Rotation period and pole ===
In December 2009, a rotational lightcurve of Petunia was obtained from photometric observations by Robert Stephens at Santana Observatory (646) and Goat Mountain Astronomical Research Station (G79) in California. Lightcurve analysis gave a long rotation period of 61.280±0.005 hours with a brightness variation of 0.38±0.03 magnitude (U=3).

Astronomers at the Palomar Transient Factory in California measured a period of 61.207±0.1286 hours and an amplitude of 0.30 magnitude in August 2013 (U=2), while observations by Italian amateur astronomers Roberto Crippa and Federico Manzini at the Sozzago Astronomical Station (A12) in April 2006 were of poor quality (U=1).

A modeled lightcurve using photometric data from the Lowell Photometric Database was published in 2016. It gave a concurring sidereal period of 61.160±0.001 hours and a spin axis at (355.0°, −78.0°) in ecliptic coordinates (λ, β).

=== Diameter and albedo ===
According to the surveys carried out by the NEOWISE mission of NASA's Wide-field Infrared Survey Explorer (WISE), the Infrared Astronomical Satellite IRAS, and the Japanese Akari satellite, Petunia measures 24.422±0.232, 27.77±2.9 and 29.51±0.49 kilometers in diameter, and its surface has an albedo of 0.233±0.021, 0.1803±0.045 and 0.204±0.008, respectively. An additional measurement published by the WISE team gives an alternative mean-diameter of 28.983±0.263 km. The Collaborative Asteroid Lightcurve Link adopts the WISE results revised by Pravec, that is an albedo of 0.1654 and a diameter of 29.12 km based on an absolute magnitude of 10.25. An asteroid occultation on 30 September 2014, gave a best-fit ellipse dimension of (29.0 km × 29.0 km). These timed observations are taken when the asteroid passes in front of a distant star. However the quality of the measurements are poorly rated.
