= 3330 =

3330 may refer to:

- A.D. 3330, a year in the 4th millennium CE
- 3330 BC, a year in the 4th millennium BCE
- 3330, a number in the 3000 (number) range

== Products ==
- IBM 3330, a hard disk drive
- Nokia 3330, a cellphone
- ALFA-PROJ Model 3330, a handgun

== Other uses ==
- 3330 Gantrisch, an asteroid in the Asteroid Belt, the 3330th asteroid registered
- Texas Farm to Market Road 3330, a state highway
