= 60 Echo =

Main-belt asteroid

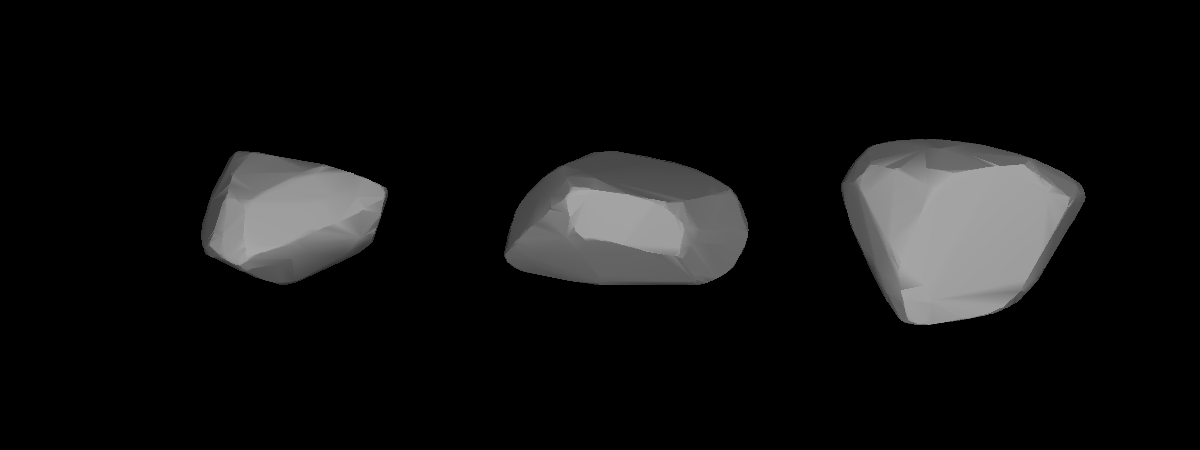
- Three-dimensional model of 60 Echo created based on its lightcurve

Discovery
- Discovered by: James Ferguson
- Discovery date: 14 September 1860

Designations
- Pronunciation: /ˈɛkoʊ/
- Named after: Echo
- Minor planet category: Main belt
- Adjectives: Echoian /ɛˈkoʊ.iən/

Orbital characteristics
- Epoch 31 December 2006 (JD 2454100.5)
- Aphelion: 2.830 AU (423.4 Gm)
- Perihelion: 1.958 AU (292.9 Gm)
- Semi-major axis: 2.394 AU (358.1 Gm)
- Eccentricity: 0.182
- Orbital period (sidereal): 1,353.002 d (3.70 yr)
- Mean anomaly: 91.065°
- Inclination: 3.602°
- Longitude of ascending node: 191.803°
- Argument of perihelion: 270.477°

Physical characteristics
- Dimensions: 60.2 km
- Mass: (3.15 ± 0.32) × 10^{17} kg
- Mean density: 2.78 ± 0.33 g/cm^{3}
- Synodic rotation period: 25.2 hr
- Geometric albedo: 0.254
- Spectral type: S
- Absolute magnitude (H): 8.21

60 Echo is a quite large main-belt asteroid. It was discovered by James Ferguson of the United States Naval Observatory in Washington D.C., on 14 September 1860. It was his third and final asteroid discovery. It is named after Echo, a nymph in Greek mythology. James Ferguson had initially named it "Titania", not realizing that name was already used for a satellite of Uranus.

This object is orbiting the Sun with a period of 3.70 years, a semimajor axis of 2.394 AU, and an eccentricity of 0.18. Its orbital plane is at an inclination of 3.6° to the plane of the ecliptic. This is a stony S-type asteroid with a cross-sectional size of 60.2 km that is spinning with a rotation period of 25.2 hr. Echo has been studied by radar. It is not known to be a member of any asteroid family.

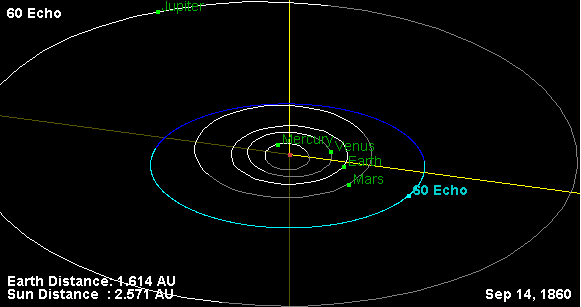
Orbit
