= 581 Tauntonia =

Outer main-belt asteroid

Discovery
- Discovered by: J. H. Metcalf
- Discovery site: Taunton, Massachusetts
- Discovery date: 24 December 1905

Designations
- Pronunciation: /tɔːnˈtoʊniə/
- Alternative designations: 1905 SH
- Minor planet category: main-belt · (outer); Alauda

Orbital characteristics
- Epoch 31 July 2016 (JD 2457600.5)
- Uncertainty parameter 0
- Observation arc: 110.15 yr (40233 d)
- Aphelion: 3.3180 AU (496.37 Gm)
- Perihelion: 3.1101 AU (465.26 Gm)
- Semi-major axis: 3.2140 AU (480.81 Gm)
- Eccentricity: 0.032339
- Orbital period (sidereal): 5.76 yr (2104.6 d)
- Mean anomaly: 24.277°
- Mean motion: 0° 10^{m} 15.78^{s} / day
- Inclination: 21.878°
- Longitude of ascending node: 102.603°
- Argument of perihelion: 28.971°

Physical characteristics
- Dimensions: 61.481±0.265 km
- Synodic rotation period: 24.987±0.007 h
- Geometric albedo: 0.031±0.005
- Spectral type: Xk (SMASSII)
- Absolute magnitude (H): 9.8

581 Tauntonia is a dark Alauda asteroid from the outer region of the asteroid belt, approximately 61 kilometers in diameter.

The asteroid is a member of the Alauda family (902), a large family of typically bright carbonaceous asteroids and named after its parent body, 702 Alauda.
