= 1067 Lunaria =

Itha asteroid

Discovery
- Discovered by: K. Reinmuth
- Discovery site: Heidelberg Obs.
- Discovery date: 9 September 1926

Designations
- Pronunciation: /luːˈnɛəriə/
- Named after: Lunaria (flowering plant)
- Alternative designations: 1926 RG · 1974 PJ; 1974 QC_{3}
- Minor planet category: main-belt · (outer); Itha

Orbital characteristics
- Epoch 4 September 2017 (JD 2458000.5)
- Uncertainty parameter 0
- Observation arc: 90.74 yr (33,142 days)
- Aphelion: 3.4206 AU
- Perihelion: 2.3207 AU
- Semi-major axis: 2.8706 AU
- Eccentricity: 0.1916
- Orbital period (sidereal): 4.86 yr (1,777 days)
- Mean anomaly: 222.90°
- Mean motion: 0° 12^{m} 9.36^{s} / day
- Inclination: 10.547°
- Longitude of ascending node: 289.59°
- Argument of perihelion: 115.03°

Physical characteristics
- Dimensions: 15.43±0.73 km 18.02±1.33 km 18.07 km (derived); 20.011±0.100 km 22.968±0.243 km
- Synodic rotation period: 6.057±0.001 h 7.74 h
- Geometric albedo: 0.1240±0.0225; 0.185±0.012; 0.20 (assumed); 0.221±0.034; 0.298±0.057
- Spectral type: L/S · S
- Absolute magnitude (H): 10.85±0.31 · 10.99 · 11.08

1067 Lunaria, provisional designation 1926 RG, is a stony Itha asteroid from the outer regions of the asteroid belt, approximately 18 kilometers in diameter. It was discovered on 9 September 1926, by astronomer Karl Reinmuth at the Heidelberg-Königstuhl State Observatory in southwest Germany. The asteroid was named after the flowering plant Lunaria (honesty).

== Orbit and classification ==
Lunaria is a member of the Itha family, a very small family of asteroids, named after its parent body 918 Itha.

It orbits the Sun in the outer asteroid belt at a distance of 2.3–3.4 AU once every 4 years and 10 months (1,777 days; semi-major axis of 2.87 AU). Its orbit has an eccentricity of 0.19 and an inclination of 11° with respect to the ecliptic. The body's observation arc begins at Heidelberg in October 1926, one month after its official discovery observation.

== Physical characteristics ==
Lunaria has been characterized as both L- and S-type asteroid by Pan-STARRS photometric survey. The overall spectral type for the Itha family is that of a stony S-type.

=== Rotation period ===
In July 1984, a first rotational lightcurve of Lunaria was obtained by American astronomer Richard Binzel. Lightcurve analysis gave a rotation period of 7.74 hours with a brightness variation of 0.13 magnitude (U=2). In September 2004, Donald Pray at the Carbuncle Hill Observatory (I00) derived a refined period of 6.057 hours with an amplitude of 0.27 magnitude from photometric observations (U=3).

=== Diameter and albedo ===
According to the surveys carried out by the Japanese Akari satellite and the NEOWISE mission of NASA's Wide-field Infrared Survey Explorer, Lunaria measures between 15.43 and 22.968 kilometers in diameter and its surface has an albedo between 0.1240 and 0.298.

The Collaborative Asteroid Lightcurve Link assumes a standard albedo for stony asteroids of 0.20 and derives a diameter of 18.07 kilometers based on an absolute magnitude of 11.08.

== Naming ==
This minor planet was named after Lunaria (commonly known as "honesty"), a flowering plant in the mustard family. The official naming citation was mentioned in The Names of the Minor Planets by Paul Herget in 1955 (H 101).

=== Reinmuth's flowers ===
Due to his many discoveries, Karl Reinmuth submitted a large list of 66 newly named asteroids in the early 1930s. The list covered his discoveries with numbers between (1009) and (1200). This list also contained a sequence of 28 asteroids, starting with 1054 Forsytia, that were exclusively named after plants, in particular flowering plants (also see list of minor planets named after animals and plants).
