= (36256) 1999 XT17 =

Main belt asteroid

(36256) 1999 XT_{17}
Discovery
- Discovered by: LINEAR
- Discovery site: Socorro, New Mexico, United States
- Discovery date: 3 December 1999

Designations
- Alternative designations: 1979 UU_{3} · 1979 VH · 1989 TF_{2}
- Minor planet category: Main belt

Orbital characteristics
- Epoch 21 November 2025 (JD 2461000.5)
- Uncertainty parameter 0
- Aphelion: 3.3049 AU
- Perihelion: 2.5722 AU
- Semi-major axis: 2.9386 A2
- Eccentricity: 0.1247
- Orbital period (sidereal): 5.0374 yr (1839.9 d)
- Mean anomaly: 356.163°
- Mean motion: 0.1957° / d
- Inclination: 10.9816°
- Longitude of ascending node: 31.122°
- Argument of perihelion: 59.833°
- Jupiter MOID: 2.0141 AU
- T_{Jupiter}: 3.235

Physical characteristics
- Mean diameter: 10.21±0.32 km
- Sidereal rotation period: 4.108048 h
- Geometric albedo: 0.186±0.033
- Spectral type: A-type
- Absolute magnitude (H): 12.54

(36256) 1999 XT_{17} is an unnamed asteroid located in the main asteroid belt. Discovered on 3 December 1999 by the Lincoln Near-Earth Asteroid Research (LINEAR) program, it was initially observed as a lost asteroid in 1979. Around 10 kilometres (6.2 mi) in size, it is the parent body of a small and unusual asteroid family. Many members of this asteroid family, including 1999 XT_{17}, are olivine-rich asteroids, suggesting that they may have originated from the mantle of a destroyed planetesimal.

== Discovery ==
1999 XT_{17} was first observed by the Crimean Astrophysical Observatory on 16 October 1979 and was assigned the provisional designation 1979 UU_{3} by the Minor Planet Center (MPC). It was observed by the Crimean Astrophysical Observatory again on 11 November of that year; believed to be a different object, it was assigned a second provisional designation, 1979 VH. It subsequently became a lost asteroid. It was briefly observed by Klet Observatory in October 1989, but was not identified as the object observed at the Crimean Astrophysical Observatory a decade earlier. The asteroid was observed again in late 1999 by the Lincoln Near-Earth Asteroid Research (LINEAR) program, located at the Experimental Test Site (ETS) in Socorro, New Mexico, United States. 3 December 1999 is marked as the official discovery date of the asteroid, and it was given its primary provisional designation 1999 XT_{17}.

Once 1999 XT_{17}'s orbit was sufficiently determined, it was assigned the number (36256) by the MPC on 27 February 2002. The MPC also linked the 1979 and 1989 observations to the asteroid that same day. As of 2025, it is unnamed.

== Orbit ==
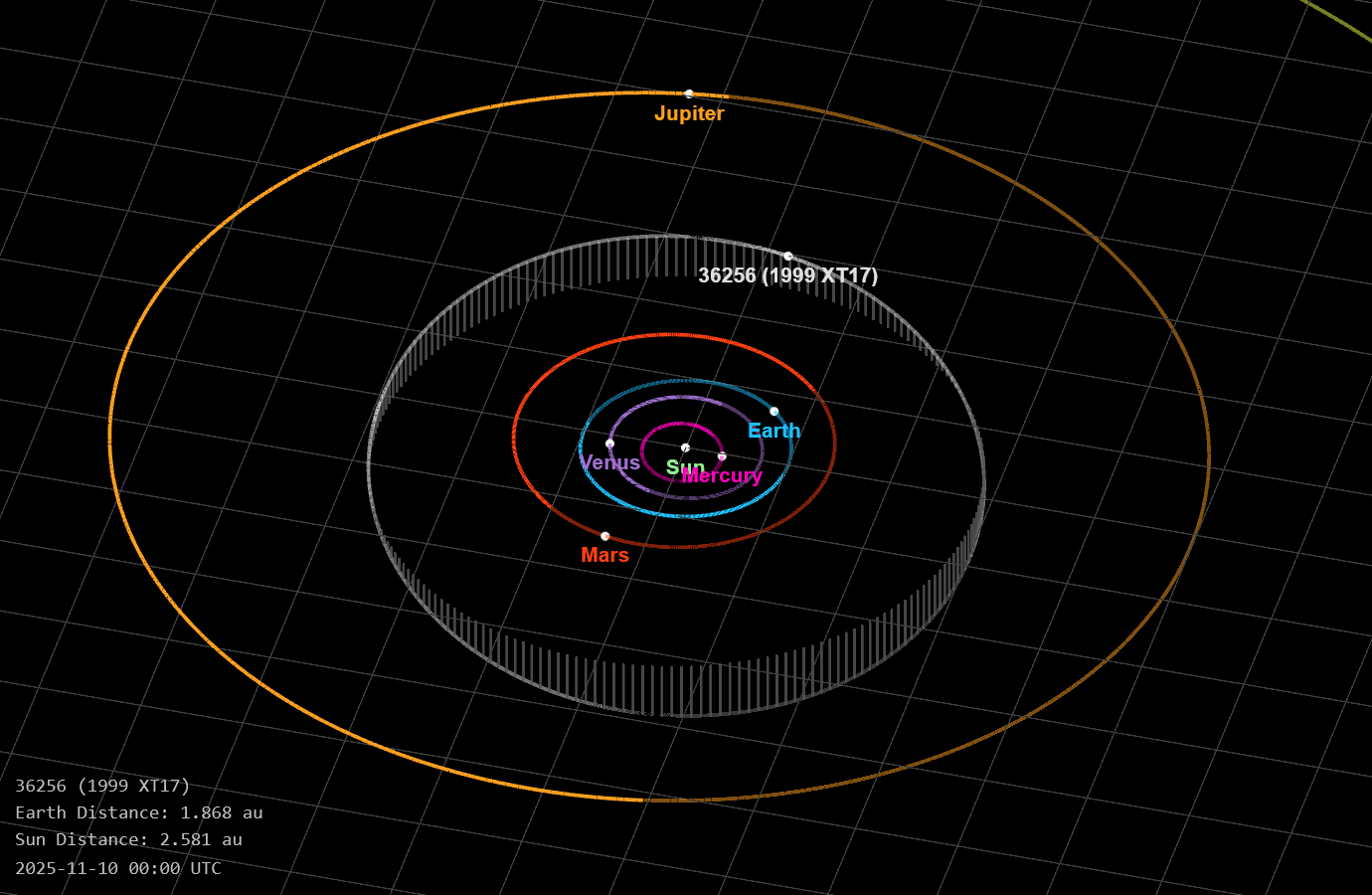
Diagram of 1999 XT_{17}'s orbit between Mars and Jupiter

1999 XT_{17} orbits the Sun at an average distance—its semi-major axis—of 2.94 astronomical units (AU), placing it in the main asteroid belt. Along its 5.04 year long orbit, its distance from the Sun varies from 2.57 AU at perihelion to 3.31 AU at aphelion due to its orbital eccentricity of 0.12. The asteroid's orbit is inclined by 10.98° with respect to the ecliptic plane.

== Asteroid family ==
1999 XT_{17} is the parent body of an asteroid family (FIN: 3029) with 661 identified members. The family lies near the outer edge of the "pristine zone", a region of the outer main belt bounded by the 5:2 and 7:3 mean motion resonances (MMRs) with Jupiter at 2.825 AU and 2.955 AU, respectively. This zone, whose name was coined in a 2013 study led by Miroslav Brož, is deficient in smaller asteroids. The bounding resonances prevent the migration of asteroids from outside the zone, and it may represent the primordial main belt population before the creation of large asteroid families.

The 1999 XT_{17} family is unusually rich in olivine-bearing A-type asteroids. Of the 36 members that have a spectral classification, 44.4% are A-types—an abundance seven times higher than the main belt average. The second-most abundant spectral type found within the family is the S-complex, comprising 30.5% of the classified population. However, S-complex members of the family may have originated from other asteroid families, becoming interlopers of the 1999 XT_{17} family. None of the five S-complex families residing within the pristine zone are close enough to the 1999 XT_{17} family to contaminate it. (Note: The S-complex families in the pristine zone are associated with 158 Koronis, 832 Karin, 918 Itha, 10811 Lau, and (15477) 1999 CG_{1}.) Instead, the Eos family is the likeliest source of contamination. The Eos family resides outside of the pristine zone, but some of its members migrated across the 7:3 Jovian MMR fast enough to avoid destabilization and now contaminate the pristine zone. A 2024 study led by M. Galinier noted that all of the 1999 XT_{17} family's S-complex members have orbits similar to known Eos family migrants, suggesting that only the A-type members are truly related to each other. If the 1999 XT_{17} family only consists of A-type asteroids, then it likely originated from the mantle of a partially or fully differentiated planetesimal.

== Physical properties ==
1999 XT_{17} is estimated to be around 10.2 kilometres (6.3 mi) in diameter, with a geometric albedo of 0.19. Photometric observations from the Asteroid Terrestrial-impact Last Alert System (ATLAS) suggests that it has a rotation period of 4.11 hours. Spectroscopic observations of 1999 XT_{17} in the near-infrared show that it is an A-type asteroid in the Bus–DeMeo and Mahlke classification schemes. Comparison of 1999 XT_{17}'s visible and near-infrared spectrum to meteorites with similar spectra suggests that it is mostly composed of pure olivine.
