= 5771 Somerville =

Main-belt asteroid

Discovery
- Discovered by: E. Bowell
- Discovery site: Anderson Mesa Stn.
- Discovery date: 21 September 1987

Designations
- Named after: Mary Somerville (Scottish polymath)
- Alternative designations: 1987 ST_{1} · 1982 YY_{1} 1989 BG_{1}
- Minor planet category: main-belt · (outer); Lixiaohua

Orbital characteristics
- Epoch 4 September 2017 (JD 2458000.5)
- Uncertainty parameter 0
- Observation arc: 34.36 yr (12,549 days)
- Aphelion: 3.8347 AU
- Perihelion: 2.4381 AU
- Semi-major axis: 3.1364 AU
- Eccentricity: 0.2226
- Orbital period (sidereal): 5.55 yr (2,029 days)
- Mean anomaly: 135.29°
- Mean motion: 0° 10^{m} 38.64^{s} / day
- Inclination: 8.2191°
- Longitude of ascending node: 288.45°
- Argument of perihelion: 101.58°

Physical characteristics
- Dimensions: 22.84 km (derived); 24.90±6.97 km 26.43±5.87 km 28.306±0.264 km 33.60±2.18 km
- Synodic rotation period: 9.20±0.05 h (Note: Lightcurve plot of (5771) Somerville, Palmer Divide Observatory, Brian D. Warner (2012), with a period of 9.20±0.05 hours and an amplitude (mag) of 0.80±0.03.)
- Geometric albedo: 0.017±0.002; 0.029±0.001; 0.03±0.03; 0.04±0.08; 0.0407 (derived)
- Spectral type: C
- Absolute magnitude (H): 12.20 · 12.30 · 12.40 · 12.50 · 12.94±0.26

5771 Somerville, provisional designation 1987 ST_{1}, is a carbonaceous Lixiaohua asteroid from the outer regions of the asteroid belt, approximately 26 kilometers in diameter. It was discovered on 21 September 1987, by American astronomer Edward Bowell at the Anderson Mesa Station of the Lowell Observatory in Flagstaff, Arizona. The asteroid was named for Scottish polymath Mary Somerville.

== Orbit and classification ==
Somerville is a member of the Lixiaohua family, an outer-belt asteroid family with more than 700 known members, consisting of C-type and X-type asteroids. The family's namesake is 3556 Lixiaohua.

The asteroid orbits the Sun in the outer main-belt at a distance of 2.4–3.8 AU once every 5 years and 7 months (2,029 days). Its orbit has an eccentricity of 0.22 and an inclination of 8° with respect to the ecliptic. Somerville was first identified as 1982 YY_{1} at Purple Mountain Observatory in December 1982. The body's observation arc begins with its official discovery observation at Flagstaff.

== Physical characteristics ==
Somerville is an assumed C-type asteroid.

=== Rotation period ===
In March 2012, a rotational lightcurve of Somerville was obtained from photometric observations by American astronomer Brian Warner at his Palmer Divide Observatory (716) in Colorado. Lightcurve analysis gave a rotation period of 9.20 hours with a brightness amplitude of 0.80 magnitude (U=2+).

=== Diameter and albedo ===
According to the surveys carried out by the Japanese Akari satellite and the NEOWISE mission of NASA's Wide-field Infrared Survey Explorer, Somerville measures between 24.90 and 33.60 kilometers in diameter and its surface has an albedo between 0.017 and 0.04.

The Collaborative Asteroid Lightcurve Link derives an albedo of 0.0407 and a diameter of 22.84 kilometers based on an absolute magnitude of 12.3.

== Naming ==
This minor planet was named after Mary Somerville (1780–1872; née Fairfax), a Scottish polymath and science writer who studied mathematics and astronomy. She is considered to be one of Europe's most distinguished women scientists of her time. The official naming citation was published by the Minor Planet Center on 12 July (M.P.C. 25444).
