= 329 Svea =

Main-belt asteroid

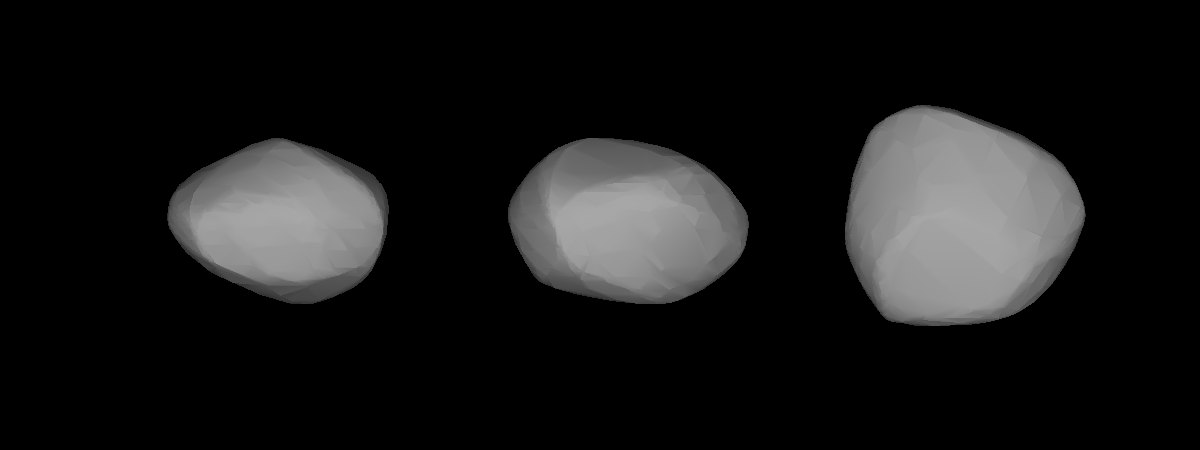
- Lightcurve-based 3D model of 329 Svea

Discovery
- Discovered by: Max Wolf
- Discovery date: 21 March 1892

Designations
- Pronunciation: /ˈsveɪə/
- Named after: Sweden
- Minor planet category: Main belt

Orbital characteristics
- Epoch 31 July 2016 (JD 2457600.5)
- Uncertainty parameter 0
- Observation arc: 124.07 yr (45316 d)
- Aphelion: 2.54003 AU (379.983 Gm)
- Perihelion: 2.41427 AU (361.170 Gm)
- Semi-major axis: 2.47715 AU (370.576 Gm)
- Eccentricity: 0.025383
- Orbital period (sidereal): 3.90 yr (1424.1 d)
- Mean anomaly: 283.525°
- Mean motion: 0° 15^{m} 10.076^{s} / day
- Inclination: 15.8826°
- Longitude of ascending node: 178.489°
- Argument of perihelion: 54.9542°

Physical characteristics
- Mean diameter: 70 ± 4 km/72 ± 3 km (LCI + occ); 78 ± 4 km (thermophysical)
- Synodic rotation period: 22.777±0.005 h
- Pole ecliptic longitude: 21° ± 7°
- Pole ecliptic latitude: 47° ± 5°
- Geometric albedo: 0.055±0.015
- Spectral type: C
- Absolute magnitude (H): 9.6

329 Svea is an asteroid from the asteroid belt and the namesake of the small Svea family, approximately 81 kilometers (50 miles) in diameter. The C-type asteroid and is probably composed of carbonaceous material.

It was discovered by Max Wolf on 21 March 1892 in Heidelberg.

The light curve of 329 Svea shows a periodicity of 22.6 ± 0.01 hours, during which time the brightness of the object varies by 0.10 ± 0.03 in magnitude.
