= 702 Alauda =

Main-belt asteroid binary

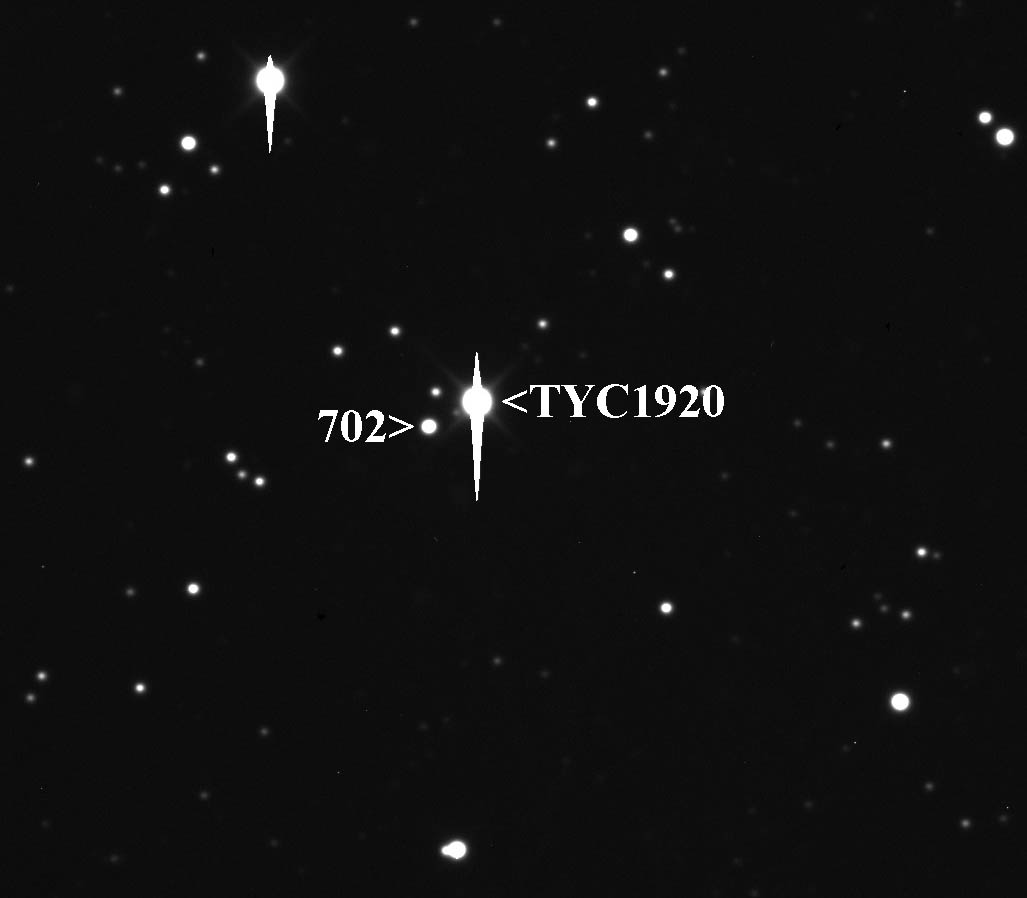
- 702 Alauda as seen an hour after occulting TYC 1920-00620-1

Discovery
- Discovered by: J. Helffrich
- Discovery site: Heidelberg Obs.
- Discovery date: 16 July 1910

Designations
- Pronunciation: /əˈlɔːdə/
- Named after: Alauda (genus of Birds)
- Alternative designations: 1910 KQ
- Minor planet category: main-belt · (outer); Alauda
- Adjectives: Alaudian

Orbital characteristics
- Epoch 4 September 2017 (JD 2458000.5)
- Uncertainty parameter 0
- Observation arc: 106.89 yr (39,040 days)
- Aphelion: 3.2533 AU
- Perihelion: 3.1372 AU
- Semi-major axis: 3.1953 AU
- Eccentricity: 0.0182
- Orbital period (sidereal): 5.71 yr (2,086 days)
- Mean anomaly: 311.58°
- Mean motion: 0° 10^{m} 21.36^{s} / day
- Inclination: 20.589°
- Longitude of ascending node: 289.77°
- Time of perihelion: 2029-Dec-23
- Argument of perihelion: 349.49°
- Known satellites: 1 (Pichi üñëm)

Physical characteristics
- Dimensions: 163.98±57.99 km 172.29±55.38 km 175 km 190.58±2.65 km 190.980±1.973 km 194.73±3.2 km 201.961±4.642 km 202±20 km
- Mass: (6.057±0.36)×10^{18} kg
- Mean density: 1.57±0.5 g/cm^{3}
- Synodic rotation period: 8.3531 h (0.34805 d)
- Geometric albedo: 0.0587±0.002
- Spectral type: C (Tholen); B (SMASSII)
- Apparent magnitude: 11.42 to 13.57
- Absolute magnitude (H): 7.25

702 Alauda /əˈlɔːdə/, provisional designation 1910 KQ, is a carbonaceous asteroid and binary system from the outer asteroid belt, approximately 190 kilometers in diameter. It is the parent body of the Alauda family. Discovered on 16 July 1910 by German astronomer Joseph Helffrich at Heidelberg Observatory, it was named after the lark (alauda). Its small moon, named Pichi üñëm, was discovered in 2007. Alauda reaches opposition on 1 January 2027.

== Satellite ==
Alauda's satellite Pichi üñëm, provisionally known as S/2007 (702) 1, was discovered on 26 July 2007 from observations using adaptive-optics imaging with the European Southern Observatory (ESO) 8-m Very Large Telescope (VLT) on Cerro Paranal, Chile. It is about 3.5 km in diameter (assuming it has the same albedo as the primary) and orbits Alauda in a nearly circular orbit at a distance of 1226.5±24 km. Pichi üñëm takes 4.91 days to complete one orbit. It was named Pichi üñëm (Mapudungun: [ˈpɪtʃi ɨˈɲɘm], approximately /ˈpɪtʃi əˈnjʌm/), meaning "little bird" in the Mapuche language of Chile, the country from which the moon was discovered.

== Orbital characteristics ==
Alauda has been identified as the largest member of the Alauda family, a dynamical family of bright carbonaceous asteroids with more than a thousand known members. Other members of this family include: 581 Tauntonia, 1101 Clematis, 1838 Ursa, 3139 Shantou, 3325 TARDIS, 4368 Pillmore, 5360 Rozhdestvenskij, 5815 Shinsengumi, and many others. Alauda's moon may be a result of the collision that created the asteroid family.

== Physical characteristics ==
The discovery and tracking of Alauda's moon enabled Alauda's mass to be determined. The discoverers of the moon, Patricio Rojo and Jean-Luc Margot, estimated Alauda's mass to be (6.057±0.36)×10^{18} kg and its density to be 1.57±0.5 g/cm^{3}.

=== Occultations ===
Alauda has been observed to occult stars on several occasions, providing important information on its size and shape. It produced occultations on 2001-07-12 and 2004-04-21. It may have occulted an apparent magnitude 9.5 star in the constellation of Gemini on 2009-10-17 at 08:18 UT. This event should have been visible from Uruguay, Argentina, and Chile.
