= 816 Juliana =

Main-belt asteroid

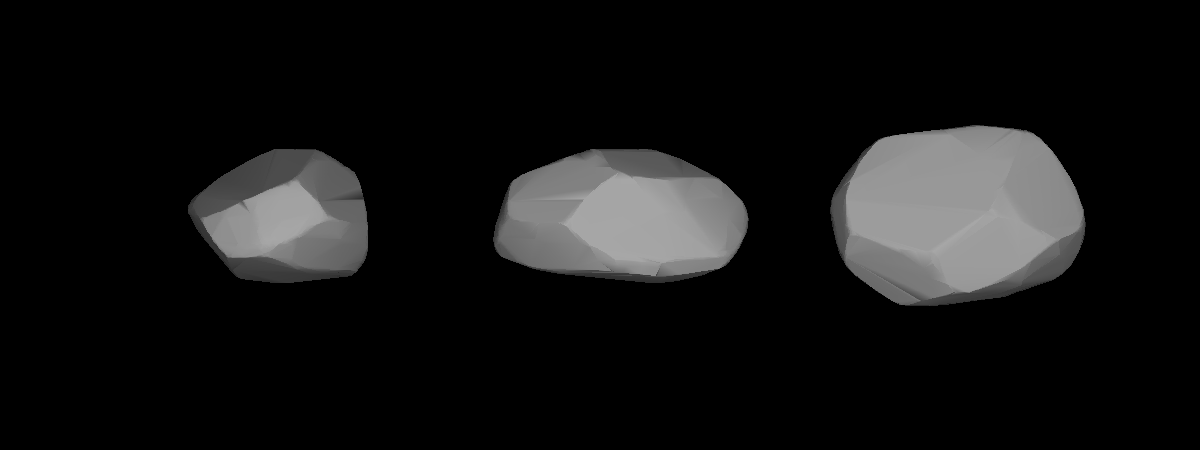
- A three-dimensional model of 816 Juliana based on its light curve

Discovery
- Discovered by: Max Wolf
- Discovery site: Heidelberg Observatory
- Discovery date: 8 February 1916

Designations
- Alternative designations: 1916 YV

Orbital characteristics
- Epoch 31 July 2016 (JD 2457600.5)
- Uncertainty parameter 0
- Observation arc: 100.18 yr (36592 d)
- Aphelion: 3.3307 AU (498.27 Gm)
- Perihelion: 2.6721 AU (399.74 Gm)
- Semi-major axis: 3.0014 AU (449.00 Gm)
- Eccentricity: 0.10971
- Orbital period (sidereal): 5.20 yr (1899.2 d)
- Mean anomaly: 104.02°
- Mean motion: 0° 11^{m} 22.38^{s} / day
- Inclination: 14.330°
- Longitude of ascending node: 127.863°
- Argument of perihelion: 21.017°

Physical characteristics
- Mean radius: 29.925±0.6 km
- Synodic rotation period: 10.58 h (0.441 d)
- Geometric albedo: 0.0311±0.001
- Absolute magnitude (H): 10.4

816 Juliana is a minor planet orbiting the Sun. It measures 59.85k in diameter. It was discovered on 8 February 1916 by Max Wolf at the Landessternwarte Heidelberg-Königstuhl Observatory in Heidelberg, Germany.

Wolf probably chose the name to honour Princess Juliana (later Queen Juliana of the Netherlands); he had previously named 392 Wilhelmina after her mother.
