= 31 Euphrosyne =

Large asteroid in the asteroid belt

- VLT-SPHERE image of Euphrosyne, deconvolved with the MISTRAL algorithm.

Discovery
- Discovered by: J. Ferguson
- Discovery date: 1 September 1854

Designations
- Pronunciation: /juːˈfrɒsɪniː/
- Named after: Εὐφροσύνη Eyphrosynē
- Alternative designations: A907 GP; A918 GB
- Minor planet category: Main belt
- Adjectives: Euphrosynean /juːfrɒsɪˈniːən/

Orbital characteristics
- Epoch 27 April 2019 (JD 2458600.5)
- Aphelion: 3.8523 AU (576.296 million km)
- Perihelion: 2.4585 AU (367.786 million km)
- Semi-major axis: 3.1554 AU (472.041 million km)
- Eccentricity: 0.2209
- Orbital period (sidereal): 5.61 yr (2041.585 d)
- Mean anomaly: 87.1671°
- Inclination: 26.3033°
- Longitude of ascending node: 31.1186°
- Time of perihelion: 15 March 2029
- Argument of perihelion: 61.4704°
- Known satellites: 1

Physical characteristics
- Dimensions: (286±16) × (274±14) × (247±15) km (294±6) × (280±10) × (248±6) km
- Mean diameter: 268±4 km 268±6 km
- Mass: (1.648±0.264)×10^{19} kg
- Mean density: 1.64±0.27 g/cm^{3} 1.665±0.242 g/cm^{3}
- Synodic rotation period: 0.230400 d (5.529595 h)
- Axial tilt: 48°
- Pole ecliptic longitude: 94° ± 5°
- Pole ecliptic latitude: 67° ± 3°
- Geometric albedo: 0.05; 0.045±0.008; 0.053±0.006
- Spectral type: C
- Apparent magnitude: 10.16 to 13.61
- Absolute magnitude (H): 6.74; 6.83

31 Euphrosyne is one of the largest asteroids (approximately tied for 7th place, to within measurement uncertainties). It was discovered by James Ferguson on 1 September 1854, the first asteroid found from North America. It is named after Euphrosyne, one of the Charites in Greek mythology. In 2019 a small companion was discovered. It is the third-roundest known asteroid (after 1 Ceres and 10 Hygiea); this is thought to be due to having re-accreted after being disrupted by a collision, and it is not close to hydrostatic equilibrium.

== Observations ==
Euphrosyne is a fairly dark body near the belt's outer edge. Consequently, it is never visible with binoculars, having a maximum apparent magnitude at the best possible opposition of around +10.2 (as in November 2011), which is fainter than any of the thirty asteroids previously discovered.

Euphrosyne has a high orbital inclination and eccentricity having nodes near perihelion and aphelion, Euphrosyne's perihelion lies at the northernmost point of its orbit. During perihelic oppositions, Euphrosyne is very high in the sky from northern latitudes and invisible from southern countries such as New Zealand and Chile.

== Surface ==
Euphrosyne is a C-type asteroid with a primitive surface possibly covered by thick ejecta blanket from the collision that created its moon and collisional family. There are no deep basins. Any craters larger than 40 km in diameter must have flat floors to not be visible in the VLT images, consistent with an icy C-type composition. The lack of craters could also be due to the young age of the surface.

== Mass and density ==
The discovery of its satellite enabled the first accurate measure of Euphrosyne's mass in 2020, at (1.7±0.3)×10^{19} kg, and thus a density of 1.7±0.2 g/cm^{3}. The low density suggests that Euphrosyne is half water ice if internal porosity is 20%.

== Family ==
Euphrosyne is the namesake of a complex family of about two thousand asteroids that share similar spectral properties and orbital elements. They are thought to have arisen from a recent collision approximately 280 million years ago. All members have relatively high orbital inclinations. The second largest body in this group, 895 Helio, is most likely an interloper.

== Satellite ==
Satellite
Discovery
- Discovery date: 2019 March 15

Orbital characteristics
- Epoch EQJ2000
- Semi-major axis: 672±12 km
- Eccentricity: 0.043+0.041 −0.014
- Orbital period (sidereal): 1.209±0.001 days
- Inclination: 1.4°±0.5°
- Longitude of ascending node: 80.1°±9.3°
- Argument of perihelion: 135.2°±13.5°

Physical characteristics
- Mean radius: 4.0±1.0 km

In 2019 a small satellite was discovered, likely resulting from the same collisional event that created the family. Preliminary orbit computations indicated an orbital period of approximately 1.2 days and a semi-major axis of 670 km. VLT images indicate that the moon is 4 km in diameter, assuming it has the same albedo as Euphrosyne.

== Gallery ==
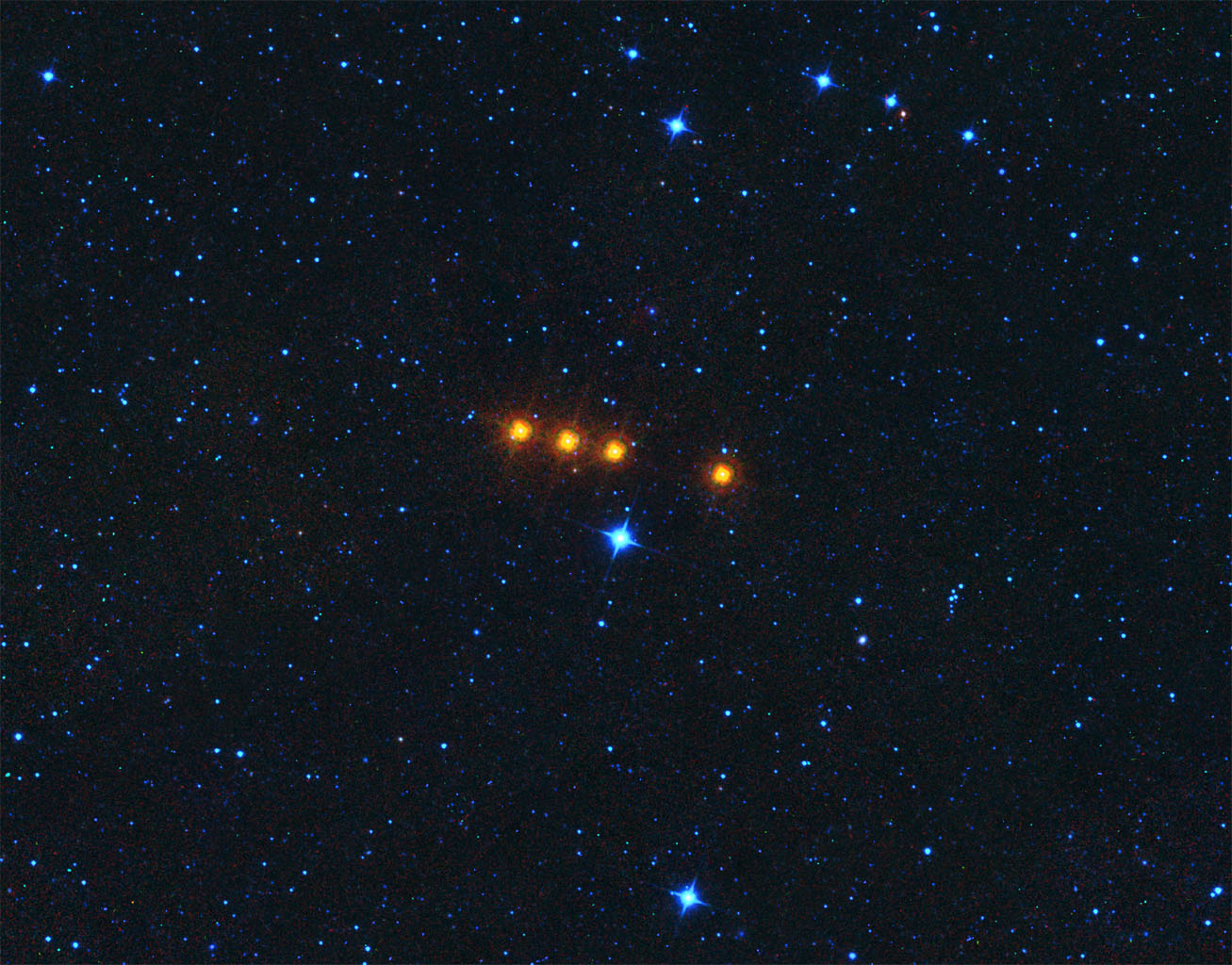
Asteroid Euphrosyne—time-lapse view by WISE (17 May 2010)
