= 50 Virginia =

Main-belt asteroid

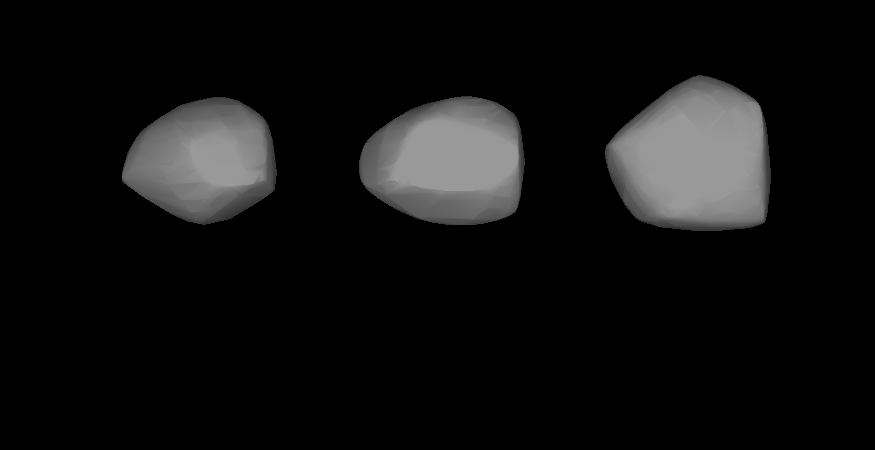
- A three-dimensional model of 50 Virginia based on its lightcurve

Discovery
- Discovered by: Karl Theodor Robert Luther, James Ferguson
- Discovery date: 4 October 1857

Designations
- Pronunciation: /vərˈdʒɪniə/
- Named after: Verginia or Virginia
- Minor planet category: Main belt

Orbital characteristics
- Epoch 31 December 2006 (JD 2454100.5)
- Aphelion: 509.817 million km (3.408 AU)
- Perihelion: 283.389 million km (1.894 AU)
- Semi-major axis: 396.603 million km (2.651 AU)
- Eccentricity: 0.285
- Orbital period (sidereal): 1,576.682 d (4.32 a)
- Mean anomaly: 210.994°
- Inclination: 2.834°
- Longitude of ascending node: 173.773°
- Argument of perihelion: 199.961°

Physical characteristics
- Dimensions: 88.51±4.65 km (composite estimate); 99.8 km
- Mass: (4.6±1.3)×10^{17} kg (Note: Calculated from its standard gravitational parameter GM = 0.031±0.009 km^{3}/s^{2}.)
- Mean density: 1.50 g/cm^{3} (Note: Assuming a diameter of 84.1 km.)
- Synodic rotation period: 14.31 h
- Geometric albedo: 0.036
- Spectral type: Ch
- Absolute magnitude (H): 9.24

50 Virginia is a large, very dark main belt asteroid. It was discovered by American astronomer James Ferguson on 4 October 1857, from the United States Naval Observatory in Washington, D.C. German astronomer Robert Luther discovered it independently on 19 October from Düsseldorf, and his discovery was announced first.

The reason for Virginia's name is not known; it may be named after Verginia, the Roman noblewoman slain by her father, but it may alternatively have been named after the American state of Virginia.

Photometric observations of this asteroid at the Organ Mesa Observatory in Las Cruces, New Mexico, during 2008 gave a light curve with a period of 14.315 ± 0.001 hours and a brightness variation of 0.19 ± 0.02 in magnitude. The shape of the light curve at the maximum was found to change with phase angle.

The orbit of 50 Virginia places it in an 11:4 mean motion resonance with the planet Jupiter. The computed Lyapunov time for this asteroid is only 10,000 years, indicating that it occupies a chaotic orbit that will change randomly over time because of gravitational perturbations of the planets.

Virginia has been studied by radar.
