= 871 Amneris =

Main-belt asteroid

Discovery
- Discovered by: Max Wolf
- Discovery site: Heidelberg
- Discovery date: 14 May 1917

Designations
- Pronunciation: /æmˈnɛrɪs/
- Alternative designations: 1917 BY
- Minor planet category: Main belt Amneris family

Orbital characteristics
- Epoch 31 July 2016 (JD 2457600.5)
- Uncertainty parameter 0
- Observation arc: 108.93 yr (39786 days)
- Aphelion: 2.4891 AU (372.36 Gm)
- Perihelion: 1.9555 AU (292.54 Gm)
- Semi-major axis: 2.2223 AU (332.45 Gm)
- Eccentricity: 0.12006
- Orbital period (sidereal): 3.31 yr (1210.0 d)
- Mean anomaly: 340.333°
- Mean motion: 0° 17^{m} 51.036^{s} / day
- Inclination: 4.2509°
- Longitude of ascending node: 158.026°
- Argument of perihelion: 66.284°

Physical characteristics
- Absolute magnitude (H): 12.6

871 Amneris is a minor planet orbiting the Sun. It is the namesake of the Amneris family, a subgroup of the Flora family of Main Belt asteroids.

This asteroid was named after Amneris, a character in Giuseppe Verdi's Aida.
