= 283 Emma =

Main-belt asteroid

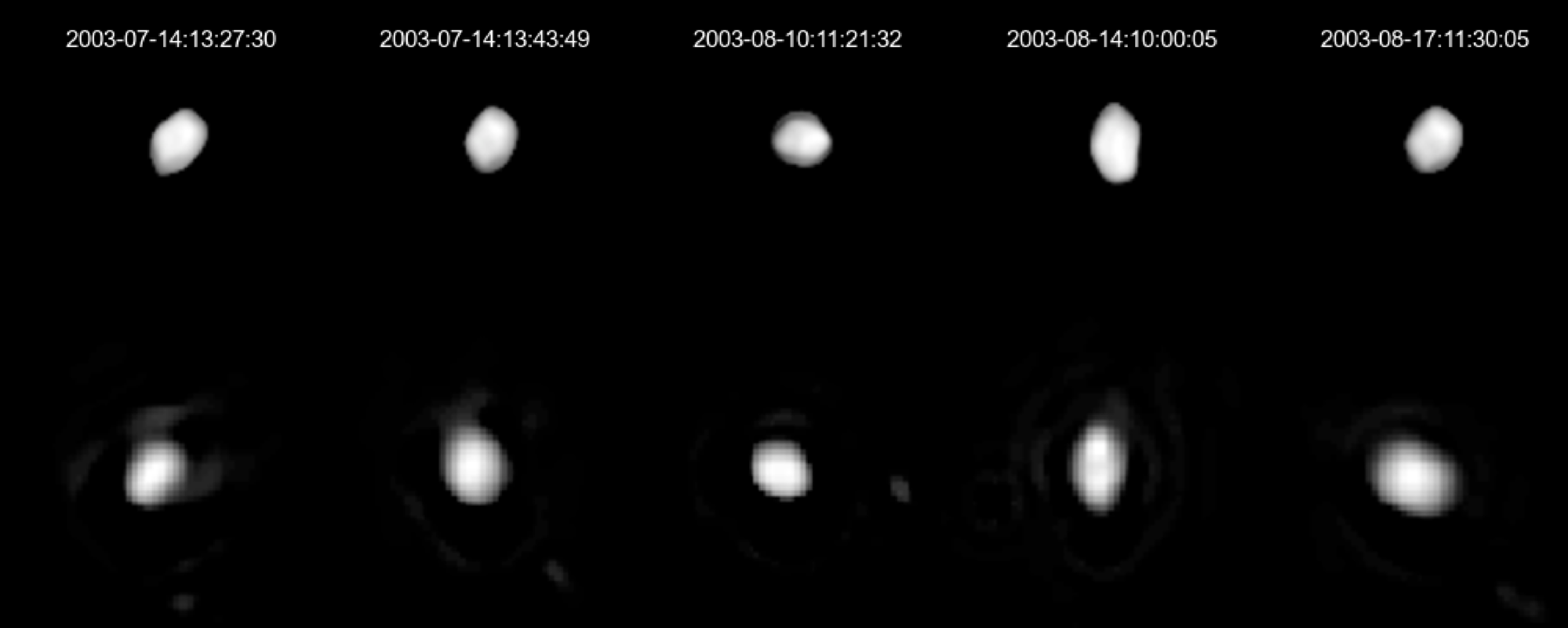
- Images of 283 Emma by telescope on the top with a three-dimensional model of the asteroid based on its lightcurve below

Discovery
- Discovered by: Auguste Charlois
- Discovery date: 8 February 1889

Designations
- Pronunciation: /ˈɛmə/
- Alternative designations: A889 CA, 1980 FJ_{12}
- Minor planet category: Main belt (Emma)

Orbital characteristics
- Epoch 31 July 2016 (JD 2457600.5)
- Uncertainty parameter 0
- Observation arc: 122.26 yr (44655 d)
- Aphelion: 3.49701 AU (523.145 Gm)
- Perihelion: 2.59675 AU (388.468 Gm)
- Semi-major axis: 3.04688 AU (455.807 Gm)
- Eccentricity: 0.14773
- Orbital period (sidereal): 5.32 yr (1942.6 d)
- Average orbital speed: 17.07 km/s
- Mean anomaly: 127.107°
- Mean motion: 0° 11^{m} 7.148^{s} / day
- Inclination: 7.99162°
- Longitude of ascending node: 304.369°
- Argument of perihelion: 53.7020°
- Known satellites: 1 (9±5 km)

Physical characteristics
- Mean diameter: 142 ± 14 km (AO)
- Mass: (1.398±0.001)×10^{18} kg
- Mean density: 0.9±0.3 g/cm^{3}
- Synodic rotation period: 6.89523 h (0.287301 d)
- Pole ecliptic longitude: 256° ± 3°
- Pole ecliptic latitude: 23° ± 3°
- Geometric albedo: 0.0262±0.002 (Dark)
- Spectral type: P
- Absolute magnitude (H): 8.72

283 Emma is a large asteroid of the asteroid belt and the namesake of the Emma family. It was discovered by Auguste Charlois on 8 February 1889, in Nice, France. The reason for its name is unknown.

Measurements made with the IRAS observatory give a diameter of 145.70±5.89 km and a geometric albedo of 0.03±0.01. By comparison, the MIPS photometer on the Spitzer Space Telescope gives a diameter of 145.44±7.72 km and a geometric albedo of 0.03±0.01. When the asteroid was observed occulting a star, the results showed a diameter of 148.00±16.26 km.

== Satellite ==
A companion for 283 Emma was detected on 14 July 2003 by W. J. Merline et al. using the Keck II telescope and is designated S/2003 (283) 1. The discovery was reported in the International Astronomical Union Circular (IAUC) 8165. The satellite orbits at a semi-major axis of about 581 km with an eccentricity of 0.12. Emma has a Hill sphere with a radius of about 28,000 km.
