= James Ferguson (American astronomer) =

American astronomer and engineer

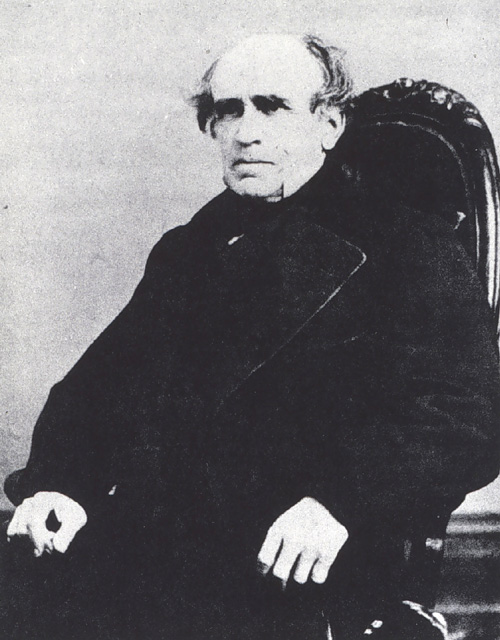
- James Ferguson
- Born: August 31, 1797; Perthshire, Scotland
- Died: September 26, 1867 (aged 70); Washington, D.C., USA
- Awards: Lalande Prize (1854, 1860)
- Scientific career
- Fields: astronomy

James Ferguson (August 31, 1797 – September 26, 1867) was a Scottish-born American astronomer and engineer, who made the first discovery of an asteroid from North America (31 Euphrosyne).

== Biography ==
James Ferguson was born in Scotland on August 31, 1797, and his family moved to the United states in 1800.

Between the ages of 17 and 19, as an assistant engineer, he helped to build the Erie Canal. Afterwards he was appointed as an astronomical surveyor, surveying the U.S. Northwest border as part of the Treaty of Ghent

Starting in 1847, he worked at the U.S. Naval Observatory in Washington, DC. He worked on the 9.6 inch refractor telescope.

Ferguson was confirmed at the Church of the Epiphany in 1863.

Ferguson was considered a bright computer and had written 84 papers as well as contributions to scientific magazines.

== Discoveries ==
Asteroids discovered: 3
31 Euphrosyne	September 1, 1854
50 Virginia	October 4, 1857
60 Echo	September 14, 1860

Throughout the years, Ferguson discovered three minor planets. The first, 31 Euphrosyne, is the first numbered minor planet to be discovered from North America.

In 1850, he discovered 50 Virginia. The asteroid was also independently discovered by Robert Luther, who reported it first, but is now credited to Ferguson.

In 1850, he "lost" a star that he had been observing, which Lt. Matthew Maury, the superintendent of the Observatory, claimed was evidence for a 9th planet (Pluto had not yet been discovered). In 1878, however, CHF Peters, director of the Hamilton College Observatory in New York, showed that the star had not in fact vanished, and that the previous results had been due to human error.

== Honors and awards ==
The asteroid 1745 Ferguson, discovered from the same observatory, was later named in his honour.

He was awarded the Lalande Prize twice, in 1854 and in 1860.
