= 895 Helio =

Main-belt asteroid

Discovery
- Discovered by: Max Wolf
- Discovery site: Heidelberg
- Discovery date: 11 July 1918

Designations
- Pronunciation: /ˈhiːlioʊ/
- Alternative designations: 1918 DU
- Adjectives: Helian /ˈhiːliən/

Orbital characteristics
- Epoch 31 July 2016 (JD 2457600.5)
- Uncertainty parameter 0
- Observation arc: 109.79 yr (40100 days)
- Aphelion: 3.6686 AU (548.81 Gm)
- Perihelion: 2.7362 AU (409.33 Gm)
- Semi-major axis: 3.2024 AU (479.07 Gm)
- Eccentricity: 0.14558
- Orbital period (sidereal): 5.73 yr (2093.2 d)
- Mean anomaly: 241.229°
- Mean motion: 0° 10^{m} 19.164^{s} / day
- Inclination: 26.077°
- Longitude of ascending node: 264.704°
- Argument of perihelion: 178.108°
- Earth MOID: 1.75069 AU (261.899 Gm)
- Jupiter MOID: 1.60187 AU (239.636 Gm)
- T_{Jupiter}: 3.019

Physical characteristics
- Mean diameter: 148.43 ± 5.02 km (composite estimate); 109.568±1.987 km
- Mass: (2.3±1.0)×10^{18} kg (Note: Calculated from its standard gravitational parameter GM = 0.156±0.070 km^{3}/s^{2}.)
- Mean density: 3.39 g/cm^{3} (Note: Assuming a diameter of 110 km.)
- Synodic rotation period: 9.3959 h (0.39150 d)
- Sidereal rotation period: 9.3959 h
- Geometric albedo: 0.0420±0.002
- Spectral type: FCB/B
- Absolute magnitude (H): 8.3

895 Helio is a large dark outer main-belt asteroid about 150 km in diameter. It was discovered on 11 July 1918 by German astronomer Max Wolf. It is named after the element helium, whose spectrum was studied by Friedrich Paschen and Carl David Tolmé Runge, with the asteroid being named by Paschen at Wolf's request; the name helium itself comes from Helios, the Greek god of the Sun.

This is a B-type asteroid. The best spectral analog for 895 Helio is the iron rich pyroxene mineral hedenbergite. It shares similar orbital properties with the 31 Euphrosyne asteroid family, but is most likely an interloper. Light curve analysis provides a rotation period of 9.4 hours.
