= 3330 Gantrisch =

Main-belt asteroid

Discovery
- Discovered by: T. Schildknecht
- Discovery site: Zimmerwald Obs.
- Discovery date: 12 September 1985

Designations
- Named after: Gantrisch mountain (Swiss Bernese Alps)
- Alternative designations: 1985 RU_{1} · 1933 FY; 1978 EF_{3} · 1978 GK_{1} 1980 TU_{11} · 1980 XW_{1} 1982 BZ · A918 UA
- Minor planet category: main-belt · (outer); Lixiaohua

Orbital characteristics
- Epoch 4 September 2017 (JD 2458000.5)
- Uncertainty parameter 0
- Observation arc: 84.28 yr (30,785 days)
- Aphelion: 3.7913 AU
- Perihelion: 2.5201 AU
- Semi-major axis: 3.1557 AU
- Eccentricity: 0.2014
- Orbital period (sidereal): 5.61 yr (2,048 days)
- Mean anomaly: 296.09°
- Mean motion: 0° 10^{m} 32.88^{s} / day
- Inclination: 10.266°
- Longitude of ascending node: 9.8648°
- Argument of perihelion: 305.86°

Physical characteristics
- Dimensions: 35.717±0.477 km
- Geometric albedo: 0.033±0.005
- Spectral type: X
- Absolute magnitude (H): 11.4

3330 Gantrisch, provisional designation 1985 RU_{1}, is a dark asteroid from the outer regions of the asteroid belt and the largest member of the Lixiaohua family, approximately 36 kilometers in diameter. It was discovered on 12 September 1985, by Swiss astronomer Thomas Schildknecht at Zimmerwald Observatory near Bern, Switzerland. It was named after the Gantrisch mountain.

== Classification ==
Gantrisch is a member of the Lixiaohua family, an outer-belt asteroid family of more than 700 known members, which consists of C-type and X-type asteroids and is named after 3556 Lixiaohua. With diameter of 36 kilometers, Gantrisch is significantly larger than all other, low-numbered members of this family: 3556 Lixiaohua (20 km), 5771 Somerville (26 km), 5900 Jensen (19 km) and 8773 Torquilla (14 km).

=== Largest member ===
Since Gantrisch is the family's largest member, the Lixiaohua family is sometimes called "Gantrisch family". However, renaming families leads to potential confusion and is discouraged by Nesvorný, who proposes to keep the original name and regards the family name as a "label", irrespective of whether or not its namesake is the largest and/or lowest numbered member.

== Orbit ==
Gantrisch orbits the Sun in the outer main-belt at a distance of 2.5–3.8 AU once every 5 years and 7 months (2,048 days). Its orbit has an eccentricity of 0.20 and an inclination of 10° with respect to the ecliptic.

The asteroid was first identified as A918 UA at Heidelberg Observatory in October 1918. The body's observation arc also begins at Heidelberg in March 1933, more than 52 years prior to its official discovery observation at Zimmerwald.

== Physical characteristics ==
According to the survey carried out by the NEOWISE mission of NASA's Wide-field Infrared Survey Explorer, Gantrisch measures 35.717 kilometers in diameter and its surface has an albedo of 0.033.

=== Rotation period ===
As of 2017, no rotational lightcurve of Gantrisch has been obtained from photometric observations. The asteroid's rotation period, poles and shape remains unknown.

== Naming ==
This minor planet was named after the Gantrisch mountain, located south of the discovering observatory in the Bernese Alps. The official naming citation was published by the Minor Planet Center on 3 May 1996 (M.P.C. 27125).
