= 1101 Clematis =

Asteroid

Discovery
- Discovered by: K. Reinmuth
- Discovery site: Heidelberg Obs.
- Discovery date: 22 September 1928

Designations
- Pronunciation: /ˈklɛmətɪs/
- Named after: κληματίς clēmatis (flowering plant)
- Alternative designations: 1928 SJ · 1928 WB; 1963 TG_{1} · 1969 TG_{1}
- Minor planet category: main-belt · (outer); Alauda
- Adjectives: Clematidian

Orbital characteristics
- Epoch 4 September 2017 (JD 2458000.5)
- Uncertainty parameter 0
- Observation arc: 89.17 yr (32,571 days)
- Aphelion: 3.4833 AU
- Perihelion: 2.9770 AU
- Semi-major axis: 3.2302 AU
- Eccentricity: 0.0784
- Orbital period (sidereal): 5.81 yr (2,120 days)
- Mean anomaly: 151.11°
- Mean motion: 0° 10^{m} 11.28^{s} / day
- Inclination: 21.424°
- Longitude of ascending node: 201.98°
- Argument of perihelion: 107.54°

Physical characteristics
- Dimensions: 29.13±1.62 km 29.65±1.21 km 33.765±0.809 km 37.60 km (derived); 37.86±1.4 km
- Synodic rotation period: 6 h 8.5994±0.0006 h 8.61±0.02 h 12.68±0.01 h 34.3±0.1 h (Note: Lightcurve plot of 1101 Clematis, Palmer Divide Observatory, B. D. Warner (2009): rotation period 34.3±0.1 hours with a brightness amplitude of 0.16±0.02 mag. Quality code of 2. Summary figures at the LCDB)
- Geometric albedo: 0.0788 (derived); 0.1124±0.009; 0.127±0.019; 0.190±0.023
- Spectral type: C (assumed)
- Absolute magnitude (H): 10.10 · 10.50 · 10.6 · 10.64±0.28

1101 Clematis /ˈklɛmətɪs/ is an Alauda asteroid from the outermost regions of the asteroid belt, approximately 37 kilometers in diameter. It was discovered on 22 September 1928, by German astronomer Karl Reinmuth at the Heidelberg-Königstuhl State Observatory in southwest Germany, and assigned the provisional designation 1928 SJ. It was named for the flowering plant Clematis. The presumably carbonaceous asteroid has a relatively long rotation period of 34.3 hours.

== Orbit and classification ==
Clematis is a member of the Alauda family (902), a large family of typically "bright" carbonaceous asteroids and named after its parent body, 702 Alauda. According to a different study, this object is also the namesake of the Clematis family, a small family of 5–16 asteroids hence they may have arisen from the same collisional event. All members have a relatively high orbital inclination.

It orbits the Sun in the outermost asteroid belt at a distance of 3.0–3.5 AU once every 5 years and 10 months (2,120 days; semi-major axis of 3.23 AU). Its orbit has an eccentricity of 0.08 and an inclination of 21° with respect to the ecliptic.

The body's observation arc begins with its observation as 1963 TG_{1} at Goethe Link Observatory in October 1963, more than 35 years after its official discovery observation at Heidelberg.

== Physical characteristics ==
Clematis is an assumed carbonaceous C-type asteroids, while the overall spectral type for members of the Alauda family is that of a somewhat brighter B-type.

=== Rotation period ===
In September 2009, a rotational lightcurve of Clematis was obtained from photometric observations by American astronomers Brian Warner at the Palmer Divide Observatory, Colorado, and by Robert Stephens at GMARS (G79, California. Lightcurve analysis gave a synodic rotation period of 34.3 hours with a brightness amplitude of 0.16 magnitude (U=2), which significantly differs from previously reported periods of 6 to 12.68 hours (U=1/2/2/2). While not being a slow rotator, Clematis has a much longer period than that known for most other asteroids, and its small amplitude is indicative for a rather spheroidal shape.

=== Diameter and albedo ===
According to the surveys carried out by the Infrared Astronomical Satellite IRAS, the Japanese Akari satellite and the NEOWISE mission of NASA's Wide-field Infrared Survey Explorer, Clematis measures between 29.13 and 37.86 kilometers in diameter and its surface has an albedo between 0.1124 and 0.190.

The Collaborative Asteroid Lightcurve Link derives an albedo of 0.0788 and a diameter of 37.60 kilometers based on an absolute magnitude of 10.5.

== Naming ==
This minor planet was named after the flowering plant Clematis, a genus within the Ranunculaceae (buttercup or crowfoot family). The official naming citation was mentioned in The Names of the Minor Planets by Paul Herget in 1955 (H n.a.).

=== Reinmuth's flowers ===
Due to his many discoveries, Karl Reinmuth submitted a large list of 66 newly named asteroids in the early 1930s. The list covered his discoveries with numbers between (1009) and (1200). This list also contained a sequence of 28 asteroids, starting with 1054 Forsytia, that were all named after plants, in particular flowering plants (also see list of minor planets named after animals and plants).
