= 845 Naëma =

Large main-belt asteroid

Discovery
- Discovered by: M. F. Wolf
- Discovery site: Heidelberg Obs.
- Discovery date: 16 November 1916

Designations
- Pronunciation: German: [ˈnaːeːmaː]
- Named after: unknown
- Alternative designations: A916 WM · 1916 AS
- Minor planet category: main-belt · (outer); Naëma

Orbital characteristics
- Epoch 31 May 2020 (JD 2459000.5)
- Uncertainty parameter 0
- Observation arc: 103.21 yr (37,699 d)
- Aphelion: 3.1439 AU
- Perihelion: 2.7324 AU
- Semi-major axis: 2.9381 AU
- Eccentricity: 0.0700
- Orbital period (sidereal): 5.04 yr (1,840 d)
- Mean anomaly: 265.75°
- Mean motion: 0° 11^{m} 44.52^{s} / day
- Inclination: 12.610°
- Longitude of ascending node: 43.144°
- Argument of perihelion: 294.62°

Physical characteristics
- Dimensions: 63.1 km × 42.5 km
- Mean diameter: 52.677±0.291 km; 54.36±2.8 km; 60.52±1.06 km
- Synodic rotation period: 20.892±0.019 h
- Geometric albedo: 0.065±0.003; 0.0788±0.009; 0.080±0.019
- Spectral type: SMASS = C
- Absolute magnitude (H): 10.20

845 Naëma (prov. designation: A916 WM or 1916 AS) is a large asteroid and the parent body of the Naëma family located in the outer regions of the asteroid belt. It was discovered on 16 November 1916, by astronomer Max Wolf at the Heidelberg-Königstuhl State Observatory in southwest Germany. The carbonaceous C-type asteroid has a rotation period of 20.9 hours and measures approximately 54 kilometers (34 miles) in diameter on average, as it is likely elongated in shape. Any reference of the asteroid's name to a person is unknown.

== Orbit and classification ==
Naëma is the parent body of the Naëma family (611), a smaller family of little more than 300 carbonaceous asteroids, when applying the hierarchical clustering method. This asteroid family is widely recognized by a number of Solar System dynamicists including Zappalà, Nesvorný, as well as Milani and Knežević (AstDyS) The family was first detected by Vincenzo Zappalà in 1994/95.

Naëma orbits the Sun in the outer asteroid belt at a distance of 2.7–3.1 AU once every 5.04 years (1,840 days; semi-major axis of 2.94 AU). Its orbit has an eccentricity of 0.07 and an inclination of 13° with respect to the ecliptic. The body's observation arc begins as A916 WM (1916 AS) with its official discovery observation at Heidelberg Observatory on 16 November 1916.

== Naming ==
Naëma is a German variant of the biblical name Naomi. However, any reference of this minor planet's name to a person or occurrence is unknown.

=== Unknown meaning ===
Among the many thousands of named minor planets, Naëma is one of 120 asteroids for which no official naming citation has been published. All of these asteroids have low numbers, the first being 164 Eva. The last asteroid with a name of unknown meaning is 1514 Ricouxa. They were discovered between 1876 and the 1930s, predominantly by astronomers Auguste Charlois, Johann Palisa, Max Wolf and Karl Reinmuth.

== Physical characteristics ==
In the Bus–Binzel SMASS classification, Naëma is a common, carbonaceous C-type asteroid, which is the overall spectral type of the Naëma family.

=== Rotation period ===
In September 2006, a rotational lightcurve of Naëma was obtained from photometric observations by Collin Bembrick at the Mount Tarana Observatory (431), Australia, in collaboration with Bill Allen and Greg Bolt. Lightcurve analysis gave a relatively long rotation period of 20.892±0.019 hours with a brightness variation of 0.16±0.02 magnitude (U=2). In December 2017, French amateur astronomer René Roy determined a lower-rated, tentative period of 12.1±0.3 hours with an amplitude of 0.05±0.01 magnitude (U=1).

=== Diameter and albedo ===
According to the surveys carried out by the NEOWISE mission of NASA's Wide-field Infrared Survey Explorer (WISE), the Infrared Astronomical Satellite IRAS, and the Japanese Akari satellite, Naëma measures (52.677±0.291), (54.36±2.8) and (60.52±1.06) kilometers in diameter and its surface has an albedo of (0.080±0.019), (0.0788±0.009) and (0.065±0.003), respectively. The Collaborative Asteroid Lightcurve Link derives an albedo of 0.0503 and a diameter of 54.05 kilometers based on an absolute magnitude of 10.2. Alternative mean diameter measurements published by the WISE team include (47.19±13.93 km), (52.419±20.30 km), (52.91±11.64 km), (56.933±0.338 km) and (60.12±2.45 km) with corresponding albedos of (0.06±0.05), (0.0417±0.0296), (0.04±0.02), (0.0718±0.0189) and (0.041±0.006).

Several asteroid occultations of Naëma have been observed between 2002 and 2010. The best-rated one, on 10 April 2010, gave a best-fit ellipse dimension of (63.1 km × 42.5 km). These timed observations are taken when the asteroid passes in front of a distant star.
