= 1048 Feodosia =

Carbonaceous asteroid

Discovery
- Discovered by: K. Reinmuth
- Discovery site: Heidelberg Obs.
- Discovery date: 29 November 1924

Designations
- Named after: Feodosiya (Crimean city)
- Alternative designations: 1924 TP · 1942 XP; 1942 XZ · 1959 SK
- Minor planet category: main-belt · (middle)

Orbital characteristics
- Epoch 16 February 2017 (JD 2457800.5)
- Uncertainty parameter 0
- Observation arc: 91.51 yr (33,425 days)
- Aphelion: 3.2268 AU
- Perihelion: 2.2377 AU
- Semi-major axis: 2.7323 AU
- Eccentricity: 0.1810
- Orbital period (sidereal): 4.52 yr (1,650 days)
- Mean anomaly: 352.46°
- Mean motion: 0° 13^{m} 5.52^{s} / day
- Inclination: 15.809°
- Longitude of ascending node: 52.766°
- Argument of perihelion: 183.31°

Physical characteristics
- Dimensions: 54.98±22.14 km 58.31±12.99 km 62.218±1.596 km 70.16±1.8 km (IRAS:9); 85.14±1.17 km
- Synodic rotation period: 10.46 h 23±1 h 35.20±0.23 h
- Geometric albedo: 0.031±0.001; 0.0452±0.002 (IRAS:9); 0.05±0.04; 0.057±0.008; 0.06±0.04
- Spectral type: B–V = 0.709; U–B = 0.309; XC (Tholen) · Ch (SMASS) · C
- Absolute magnitude (H): 9.66 · 9.75

1048 Feodosia, provisional designation 1924 TP, is a carbonaceous asteroid from the middle region of the asteroid belt, approximately 70 kilometers in diameter.

It was discovered on 29 November 1924, by German astronomer Karl Reinmuth at Heidelberg Observatory in southwest Germany, and named for the Crimean city of Feodosiya.

== Classification and orbit ==
Feodosia orbits the Sun in the middle main-belt at a distance of 2.2–3.2 AU once every 4 years and 6 months (1,650 days). Its orbit has an eccentricity of 0.18 and an inclination of 16° with respect to the ecliptic. The body's observation arc begins at Johannesburg, 3 years after its official discovery observation at Heidelberg. On 22 November 2005, it occulted the star TYC 1236-138 as seen from Earth.

== Physical characteristics ==
The dark C-type asteroid is classified as a XC and Ch intermediary type in the Tholen and SMASS taxonomy, respectively.

=== Photometry ===
In March 1985, a rotational lightcurve of Feodosia was obtained by European astronomer at ESO's La Silla Observatory in Chile, using the Bochum 0.61-metre Telescope during three nights. It gave a rotation period of 10.46 hours with a brightness variation of 0.14 magnitude (U=2).

The asteroid was also observed by French amateur astronomer Pierre Antonini in January 2007, and by the Spanish Observadores de Asteroides (OBAS) group in February 2016. However, the obtained lightcurves were only fragmentary and gave a divergent period of 23 and 35.2 hours with and amplitude of 0.04 and 0.13 magnitude, respectively (U=1+/1).

=== Diameter and albedo ===
According to the surveys carried out by the Infrared Astronomical Satellite IRAS, the Japanese Akari satellite, and NASA's Wide-field Infrared Survey Explorer with its subsequent NEOWISE mission, the asteroid measures between 54.98 and 85.14 kilometers in diameter, and its surface has an albedo between 0.031 and 0.06. The Collaborative Asteroid Lightcurve Link adopts the results obtained by IRAS, that is, an albedo of 0.0452 and a diameter of 70.16 kilometers based on an absolute magnitude of 9.75.

== Naming ==
This minor planet was named for the city Feodosiya on the Crimean peninsula. The named was proposed by I. Putilin, who computed the body's orbital elements.
