= 618 Elfriede =

Main-belt asteroid

Discovery
- Discovered by: K. Lohnert
- Discovery site: Heidelberg
- Discovery date: 17 October 1906

Designations
- Pronunciation: German: [ɛlˈfʁiːdə]
- Alternative designations: 1906 VZ

Orbital characteristics
- Epoch 31 July 2016 (JD 2457600.5)
- Uncertainty parameter 0
- Observation arc: 109.50 yr (39996 d)
- Aphelion: 3.4223 AU (511.97 Gm)
- Perihelion: 2.9551 AU (442.08 Gm)
- Semi-major axis: 3.1887 AU (477.02 Gm)
- Eccentricity: 0.073271
- Orbital period (sidereal): 5.69 yr (2079.8 d)
- Mean anomaly: 142.019°
- Mean motion: 0° 10^{m} 23.124^{s} / day
- Inclination: 17.037°
- Longitude of ascending node: 111.070°
- Argument of perihelion: 228.138°

Physical characteristics
- Mean diameter: 145+15 −13 km/145 ± 7 km (pole solution 1); 146+15 −16 km/155 ± 2 km (pole solution 2)
- Mass: (4.24±0.69)×10^{18} kg (Note: Calculated from its standard gravitational parameter GM = 0.283±0.046 km^{3}/s^{2}.)
- Mean density: 2.17–2.66 g/cm^{3} (calculated)
- Synodic rotation period: 14.79565±0.00002 h (pole solution 1); 14.79564±0.00002 h (pole solution 2)
- Pole ecliptic longitude: 102° ± 20° or 341° ± 13°
- Pole ecliptic latitude: 64° ± 7° or 49° ± 6°
- Geometric albedo: 0.047+0.010 −0.003 (pole solution 1); 0.053+0.002 −0.009 (pole solution 2)
- Absolute magnitude (H): 8.3

618 Elfriede is a minor planet orbiting the Sun. On July 24, 2013, it occulted the magnitude 12.8 star 2UCAC 23949304, over parts of Mexico and southwestern United States.

Photometric observations of this asteroid collected during 2008 show a rotation period of 14.85 ± 0.01 hours with a brightness variation of 0.12 ± 0.02 magnitude.
