= 918 Itha =

Main-belt asteroid

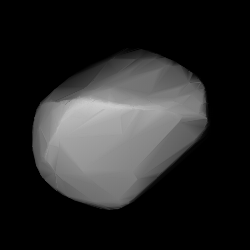
- Modelled shape of Itha from its lightcurve

Discovery
- Discovered by: K. Reinmuth
- Discovery site: Heidelberg Obs.
- Discovery date: 22 August 1919

Designations
- Named after: Name picked from the almanac Lahrer Hinkender Bote
- Alternative designations: A919 QD · 1919 FR; A907 CA · 1907 CA; 1943 PB
- Minor planet category: main-belt · (outer); Itha

Orbital characteristics
- Epoch 31 May 2020 (JD 2459000.5)
- Uncertainty parameter 0
- Observation arc: 99.72 yr (36,421 d)
- Aphelion: 3.4078 AU
- Perihelion: 2.3197 AU
- Semi-major axis: 2.8637 AU
- Eccentricity: 0.1900
- Orbital period (sidereal): 4.85 yr (1,770 d)
- Mean anomaly: 273.51°
- Mean motion: 0° 12^{m} 12.24^{s} / day
- Inclination: 12.070°
- Longitude of ascending node: 330.46°
- Argument of perihelion: 15.565°

Physical characteristics
- Mean diameter: 20.44±1.9 km; 21.37±0.84 km; 21.561±0.106 km
- Synodic rotation period: 3.47393±0.00006 h
- Geometric albedo: 0.203±0.018; 0.2220±0.048; 0.224±0.034
- Spectral type: S (SMASS-I; Xu)
- Absolute magnitude (H): 10.6

918 Itha (prov. designation: A919 QD or 1919 FR) is a stony asteroid and the namesake as well as the principal body of the Itha family, located in the outer region of the asteroid belt. It was discovered by German astronomer Karl Reinmuth at the Heidelberg Observatory on 22 August 1919. The S-type asteroid has a notably short rotation period of only 3.5 hours and measures approximately 21 kilometers (13 miles) in diameter. It was named "Itha", a female name taken from the almanac Lahrer Hinkender Bote, unrelated to the discoverer's contemporaries.

== Orbit and classification ==
When applying the synthetic hierarchical clustering method (HCM) by Nesvorný, Itha is the principal body and namesake of the Itha family (633), a small family of stony asteroids with only a few dozen known members. Other larger and low-numbered members of this family include 968 Petunia, 1067 Lunaria, 3787 Aivazovskij, 4119 Miles and 5232 Jordaens. However, according to another HCM-analysis by Milani and Knežević (AstDys), Itha is a background asteroid as it is not a legitimate family in their analysis. It orbits the Sun in the outer asteroid belt at a distance of 2.3–3.4 AU once every 4 years and 10 months (1,770 days; semi-major axis of 2.86 AU). Its orbit has an eccentricity of 0.19 and an inclination of 12° with respect to the ecliptic. Itha was first observed as A907 CA (1907 CA) at the U.S. Taunton Observatory (803) in Massachusetts. The body's observation arc begins at Heidelberg Observatory on 23 August 1919, the night after its official discovery observation.

== Naming ==
This minor planet was named "Itha", picked from the Lahrer Hinkender Bote, an almanac which was published in Lahr, southern Germany. Especially in the Alemannic-speaking region, a Hinkender Bote (lit. "limping messenger") was very popular from the late 17th throughout the early 20th century. The calendar section contains feast days, the dates of important fairs and astronomical ephemerides. For 15 January, the calendar gives "Itha" as the German name day analogue next to Maurus and Habakuk, the protestant and catholic entries in the calendar of saints, likely referring to Saint Maurus and prophet Habakkuk.

=== Reinmuth's calendar names ===
As with 22 other asteroids – starting with 913 Otila, and ending with 1144 Oda – Reinmuth selected names from this calendar due to his many asteroid discoveries that he had trouble thinking of proper names. These names are not related to the discoverer's contemporaries. Lutz Schmadel, the author of the Dictionary of Minor Planet Names learned about Reinmuth's source of inspiration from private communications with Dutch astronomer Ingrid van Houten-Groeneveld, who worked as a young astronomer at Heidelberg.

== Physical characteristics ==
Itha is an S-type asteroid in the SMASS-I classification by Xu (1995). This agrees with the overall spectral type for members of the Itha family.

=== Rotation period ===
In June 2011, a rotational lightcurve of Itha was obtained from photometric observations by Julian Oey at Kingsgrove Observatory (E19), Australia, in collaboration with three Argentinian astronomers. Lightcurve analysis gave a well-defined rotation period of 3.47393±0.00006 hours with a brightness variation of 0.30±0.03 magnitude (U=3). Two modeled lightcurves using photometric data from the Lowell Photometric Database and from the BlueEye600 robotic telescope (L36) at Ondřejov Observatory gave a sidereal period of 3.473810±0.000001 and 3.473808±0.000002, respectively. The modelling of the former gave two poles at (59.0°, −59.0°) and (249.0°, −72.0°), while that of the latter gave only one pole at (72.0°, −54.0°) in ecliptic coordinates (λ, β).

=== Diameter and albedo ===
According to the surveys carried out by the Infrared Astronomical Satellite IRAS, the Japanese Akari satellite, and the NEOWISE mission of NASA's Wide-field Infrared Survey Explorer (WISE), Itha measures (20.44±1.9), (21.37±0.84) and (21.561±0.106) kilometers in diameter, and its surface has an albedo of (0.2220±0.048), (0.203±0.018) and (0.224±0.034), respectively. The Collaborative Asteroid Lightcurve Link derives an albedo of 0.2412 and a diameter of 20.53 km based on an absolute magnitude of 10.6. Other published mean-diameters by the WISE team include (20.335±0.281 km) and (23.715±0.094 km) with corresponding albedos of (0.224±0.034) and (0.1672±0.0333).
