= 392 Wilhelmina =

Main-belt asteroid

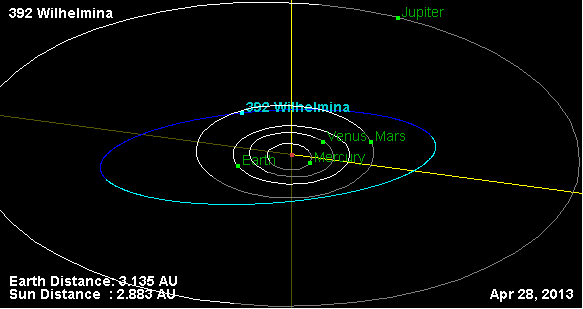
- Orbital diagram

Discovery
- Discovered by: Max Wolf
- Discovery date: 4 November 1894

Designations
- Pronunciation: /ˌwɪlhɛlˈmiːnə, wɪləˈmiːnə/
- Named after: Queen Wilhelmina
- Alternative designations: 1894 BF
- Minor planet category: Main belt

Orbital characteristics
- Epoch 31 July 2016 (JD 2457600.5)
- Uncertainty parameter 0
- Observation arc: 121.38 yr (44333 d)
- Aphelion: 3.29116 AU (492.351 Gm)
- Perihelion: 2.4759 AU (370.39 Gm)
- Semi-major axis: 2.88354 AU (431.371 Gm)
- Eccentricity: 0.14136
- Orbital period (sidereal): 4.90 yr (1788.5 d)
- Mean anomaly: 322.000°
- Mean motion: 0° 12^{m} 4.633^{s} / day
- Inclination: 14.321°
- Longitude of ascending node: 209.819°
- Argument of perihelion: 174.112°

Physical characteristics
- Dimensions: 62.88±1.5 km
- Synodic rotation period: 17.96 h (0.748 d)
- Geometric albedo: 0.0589±0.003
- Absolute magnitude (H): 9.8

392 Wilhelmina is a large Main belt asteroid.

It was discovered by Max Wolf on 4 November 1894 in Heidelberg, Germany.
