= 3556 Lixiaohua =

Main-belt asteroid

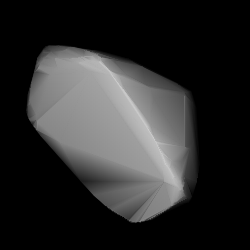
- Shape model of Lixiaohua from its lightcurve

Discovery
- Discovered by: Purple Mountain Obs.
- Discovery site: Purple Mountain Obs.
- Discovery date: 30 October 1964

Designations
- Named after: Li Xiaohua (Chinese philanthropist)
- Alternative designations: 1964 UO · 1981 YT_{1}
- Minor planet category: main-belt · (outer); Lixiaohua/Gantrisch

Orbital characteristics
- Epoch 4 September 2017 (JD 2458000.5)
- Uncertainty parameter 0
- Observation arc: 52.49 yr (19,173 days)
- Aphelion: 3.8577 AU
- Perihelion: 2.4883 AU
- Semi-major axis: 3.1730 AU
- Eccentricity: 0.2158
- Orbital period (sidereal): 5.65 yr (2,064 days)
- Mean anomaly: 169.06°
- Mean motion: 0° 10^{m} 27.84^{s} / day
- Inclination: 9.2364°
- Longitude of ascending node: 240.89°
- Argument of perihelion: 143.70°

Physical characteristics
- Mean diameter: 20.085±0.036 km
- Geometric albedo: 0.035±0.004
- Absolute magnitude (H): 12.8

3556 Lixiaohua (prov. designation: 1964 UO) is a dark Lixiaohua asteroid from the outer region of the asteroid belt, approximately 20 kilometers (12 miles) in diameter. It is the parent body of the Lixiaohua family. The asteroid was discovered on 30 October 1964, by astronomers at the Purple Mountain Observatory near Nanjing, China. It was named after Chinese philanthropist Li Xiaohua.

== Orbit and classification ==
Lixiaohua is the parent body and namesake of the Lixiaohua family, a smaller asteroid family of more than 700 known members which consists of C-type and X-type asteroid. The family is located in a zone of the outer main-belt where several orbital resonance overlap. Members of this family are also prone to close encounters with other large asteroids such as with the dwarf planet Ceres. With a diameter of 35 kilometers, the family's largest member is 3330 Gantrisch, which is the reason why the Lixiaohua family is often called "Gantrisch family". It is estimated that the family is 155±36 million years old.

It orbits the Sun at a distance of 2.5–3.9 AU once every 5 years and 8 months (2,064 days). Its orbit has an eccentricity of 0.22 and an inclination of 9° with respect to the ecliptic. The body's observation arc begins with its official discovery observation at Nanjing in 1964.

== Naming ==
This minor planet was named after Chinese philanthropist and industrialist from Beijing, who establish several schools in remote areas of China. The official naming citation was published by the Minor Planet Center on 5 January 1996 (M.P.C. 26424).

== Physical characteristics ==
=== Rotation period ===
As of 2017, no rotational lightcurve of Lixiaohua has been obtained from photometric observations. The asteroid's rotation period, poles and shape remains unknown.

=== Diameter and albedo ===
According to the survey carried out by the NEOWISE mission of NASA's Wide-field Infrared Survey Explorer, Lixiaohua measures 20.085 kilometers in diameter and its surface has a low albedo of 0.035.
