= 635 Vundtia =

Main-belt asteroid

Discovery
- Discovered by: K. Lohnert
- Discovery site: Heidelberg
- Discovery date: 9 June 1907

Designations
- Alternative designations: 1907 ZS

Orbital characteristics
- Epoch 31 July 2016 (JD 2457600.5)
- Uncertainty parameter 0
- Observation arc: 108.85 yr (39759 d)
- Aphelion: 3.3817 AU (505.90 Gm)
- Perihelion: 2.9029 AU (434.27 Gm)
- Semi-major axis: 3.1423 AU (470.08 Gm)
- Eccentricity: 0.076190
- Orbital period (sidereal): 5.57 yr (2034.6 d)
- Mean anomaly: 80.707°
- Mean motion: 0° 10^{m} 36.984^{s} / day
- Inclination: 11.030°
- Longitude of ascending node: 183.060°
- Argument of perihelion: 224.045°

Physical characteristics
- Mean radius: 47.21±0.25 km
- Mass: (1.2±1.2)×10^{18} kg (Note: Calculated from its standard gravitational parameter GM = 0.08±0.08 km^{3}/s^{2}.) (SB441)
- Mean density: 2.7±2.7 g/cm^{3} (calculated)
- Synodic rotation period: 11.790 h (0.4913 d)
- Geometric albedo: 0.0456±0.002
- Absolute magnitude (H): 9.01

635 Vundtia is a minor planet orbiting the Sun.
