= 260 Huberta =

Main-belt asteroid

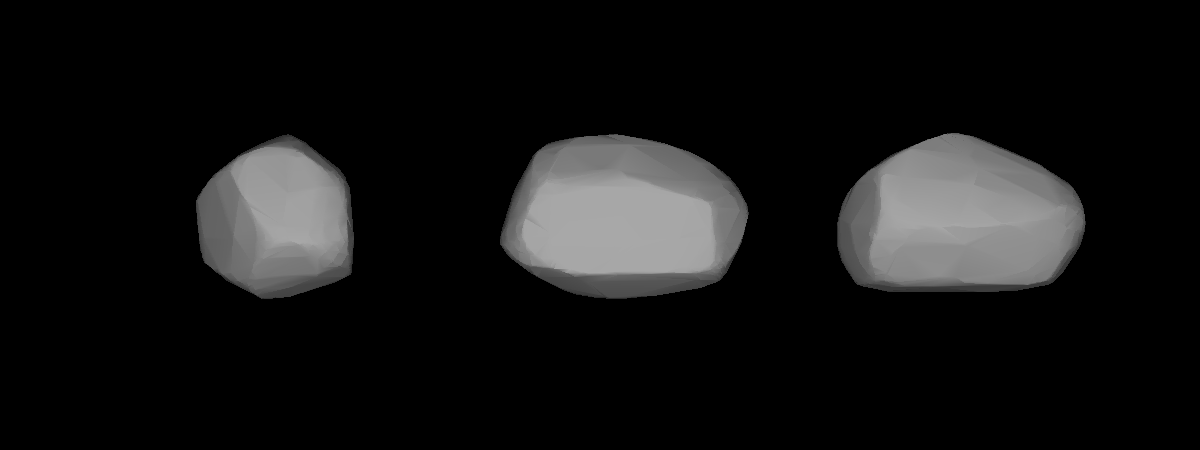
- A three-dimensional model of 260 Huberta based on its lightcurve

Discovery
- Discovered by: Johann Palisa
- Discovery date: 3 October 1886

Designations
- Pronunciation: /hjuːˈbɜːrtə/
- Named after: Hubertus
- Alternative designations: A886 TA, 1906 VH; 1911 ME
- Minor planet category: Main belt (Cybele)

Orbital characteristics
- Epoch 31 July 2016 (JD 2457600.5)
- Uncertainty parameter 0
- Observation arc: 109.37 yr (39947 d)
- Aphelion: 3.84026 AU (574.495 Gm)
- Perihelion: 3.04743 AU (455.889 Gm)
- Semi-major axis: 3.44384 AU (515.191 Gm)
- Eccentricity: 0.11511
- Orbital period (sidereal): 6.39 yr (2334.3 d)
- Average orbital speed: 16.05 km/s
- Mean anomaly: 110.638°
- Mean motion: 0° 9^{m} 15.188^{s} / day
- Inclination: 6.41599°
- Longitude of ascending node: 165.393°
- Argument of perihelion: 180.996°

Physical characteristics
- Dimensions: 94.67±3.6 km
- Synodic rotation period: 8.29 h (0.345 d)
- Geometric albedo: 0.0509±0.004
- Spectral type: CX
- Absolute magnitude (H): 8.97

260 Huberta is a large asteroid orbiting near the outer edge of the Main belt. It is dark and rich in carbon. It belongs to the Cybele group of asteroids.

It was discovered by Johann Palisa on 3 October 1886 in Vienna and was named after Saint Hubertus.
