= Asteroid family =

Asteroid population sharing similar proper orbital elements

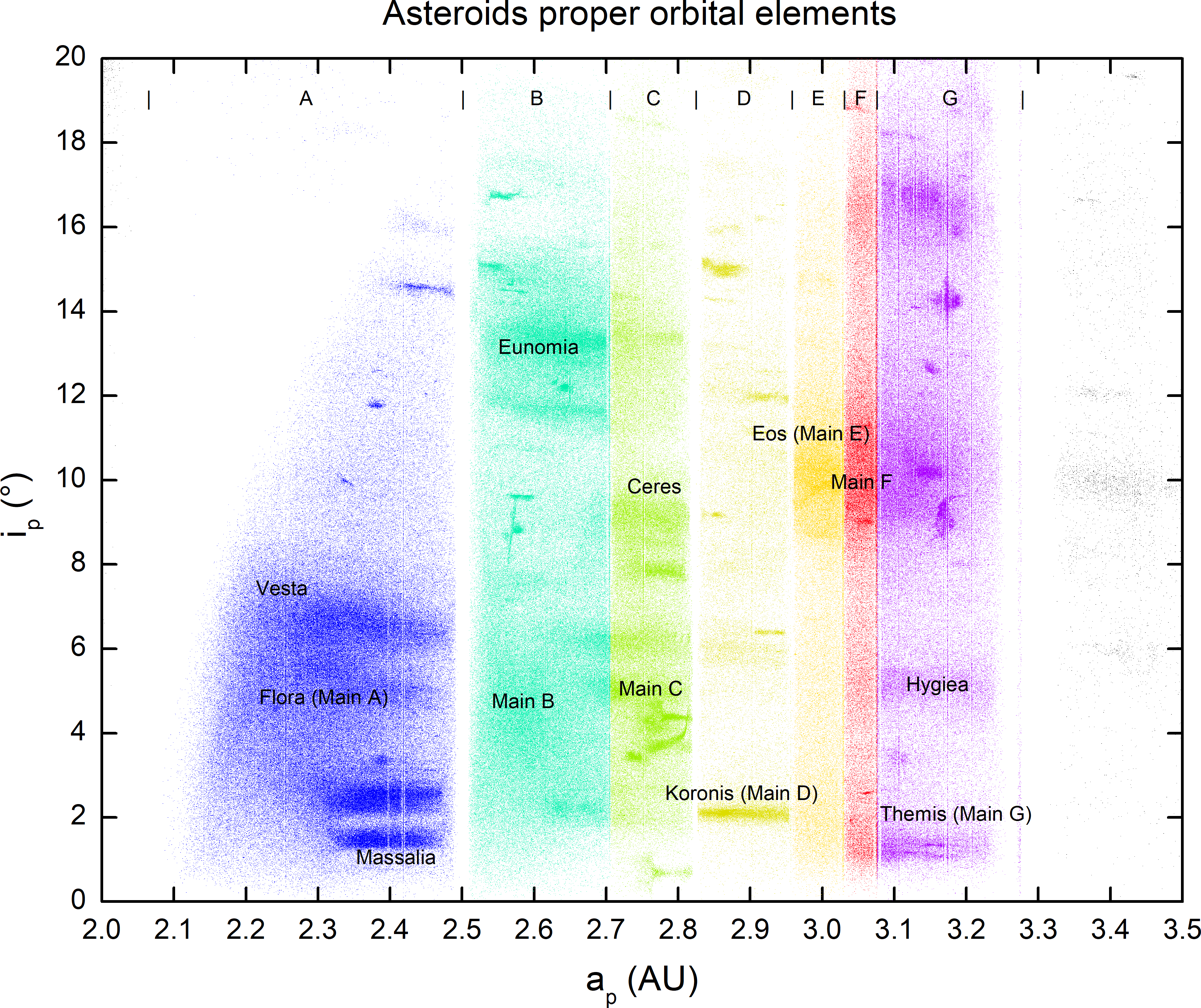
Asteroid families become visible as distinct concentrations when asteroids are plotted in the proper orbital element space (i_{p} vs a_{p}). Some prominent families are the Vesta, Eunomia, Koronis, Eos, and Themis family located in different (colorized) regions of the asteroid belt.

An asteroid family is a population of asteroids that share similar proper orbital elements, such as semi-major axis, eccentricity, and orbital inclination. The members of the families are thought to be fragments of past asteroid collisions. An asteroid family is a more specific term than asteroid group, whose members, while sharing some broad orbital characteristics, may be otherwise unrelated to each other.

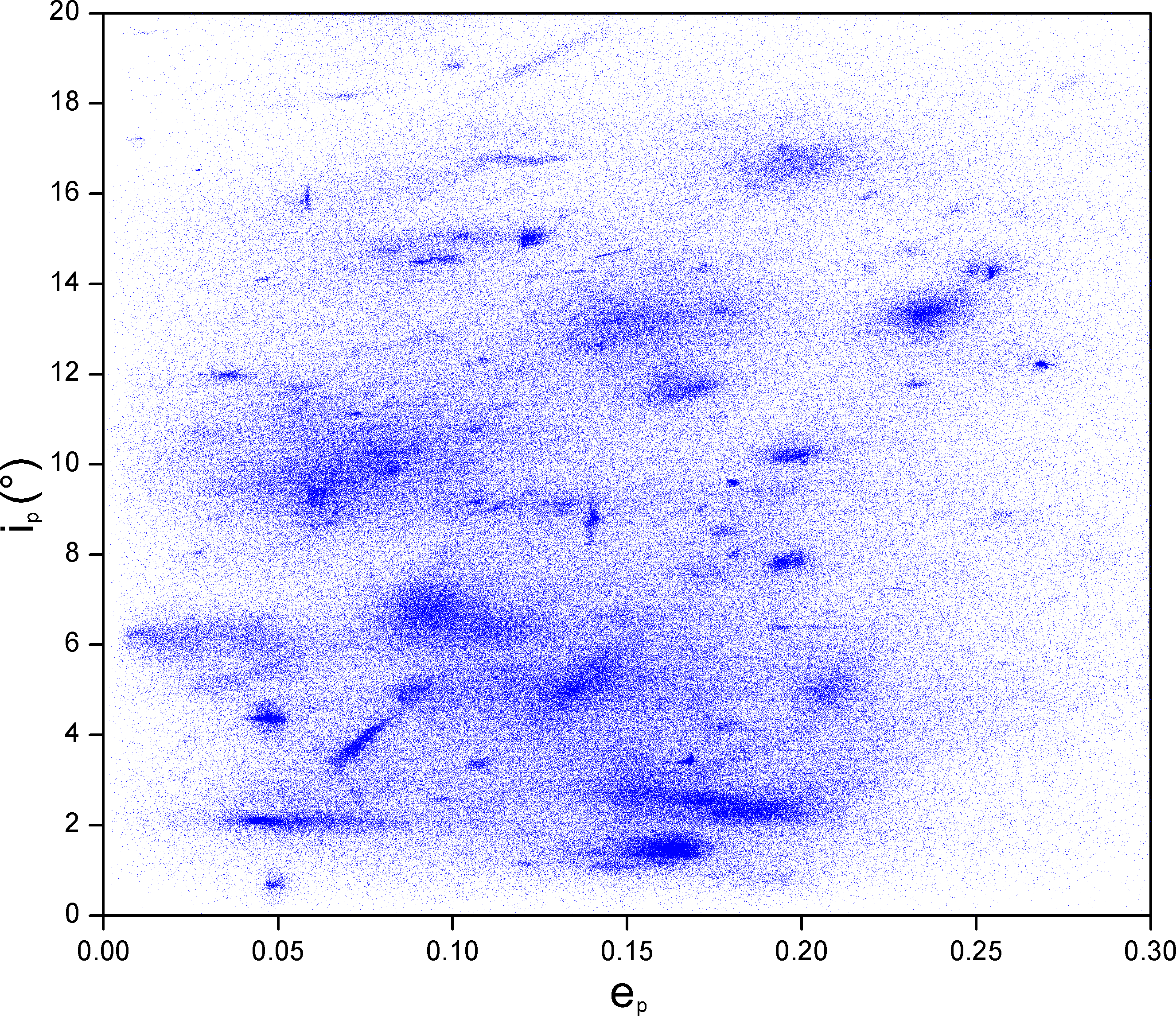
Plot of proper inclination vs. eccentricity for multi-opposition main-belt asteroids

Large prominent families contain several hundred recognized asteroids (and many more smaller objects which may be either not-yet-analyzed, or not-yet-discovered). Small, compact families may have only about ten identified members. About 33% to 35% of asteroids in the main belt are family members. There are about 20 to 30 reliably recognized families, with several tens of less certain groupings. Most asteroid families are found in the main asteroid belt, although several family-like groups such as the Pallas family, Hungaria family, and the Phocaea family lie at smaller semi-major axis or larger inclination than the main belt.

One family has been identified associated with the dwarf planet Haumea. Some studies have tried to find evidence of collisional families among the trojan asteroids, but at present the evidence is inconclusive. For asteroids that are near the Earth, in addition to classification by family, a separate 4-group orbital classification system is also used.

== History ==
The Japanese astronomer Kiyotsugu Hirayama (1874–1943) pioneered the estimation of proper elements for asteroids, and first identified several of the most prominent families in 1918. Kiyotsugu Hirayama initially identified the Koronis, Eos, and Themis families, and later recognized also the Flora and Maria families. In his honor, asteroid families are sometimes called Hirayama families. This particularly applies to the five prominent groupings discovered by him.

== Origin and evolution ==
The families are thought to form as a result of collisions between asteroids. In many or most cases the parent body was shattered, but there are also several families which resulted from a large cratering event which did not disrupt the parent body (e.g. the Vesta, Pallas, Hygiea, and Massalia families). Such cratering families typically consist of a single large body and a swarm of asteroids that are much smaller. Some families (e.g. the Flora family) have complex internal structures which are not satisfactorily explained at the moment, but may be due to several collisions in the same region at different times.

Due to the method of origin, all the members have closely matching compositions for most families. Notable exceptions are those families (such as the Vesta family) which formed from a large differentiated parent body.

Asteroid families are thought to have lifetimes of the order of a billion years, depending on various factors (e.g. smaller asteroids are lost faster). This is significantly shorter than the Solar System's age, so few if any are relics of the early Solar System. Decay of families occurs both because of slow dissipation of the orbits due to perturbations from Jupiter or other large bodies, and because of collisions between asteroids which grind them down to small bodies. Such small asteroids then become subject to perturbations such as the Yarkovsky effect that can push them towards orbital resonances with Jupiter over time. Once there, they are relatively rapidly ejected from the asteroid belt. Tentative age estimates have been obtained for some families, ranging from hundreds of millions of years to less than several million years as for the compact Karin family. Old families are thought to contain few small members, and this is the basis of the age determinations.

It is supposed that many very old families have lost all the smaller and medium-sized members, leaving only a few of the largest intact. A suggested example of such old family remains are the 9 Metis and 113 Amalthea asteroid pair. Further evidence for a large number of past families (now dispersed) comes from analysis of chemical ratios in iron meteorites. These show that there must have once been at least 50 to 100 parent bodies large enough to be differentiated, that have since been shattered to expose their cores and produce the actual meteorites.

== Identification ==
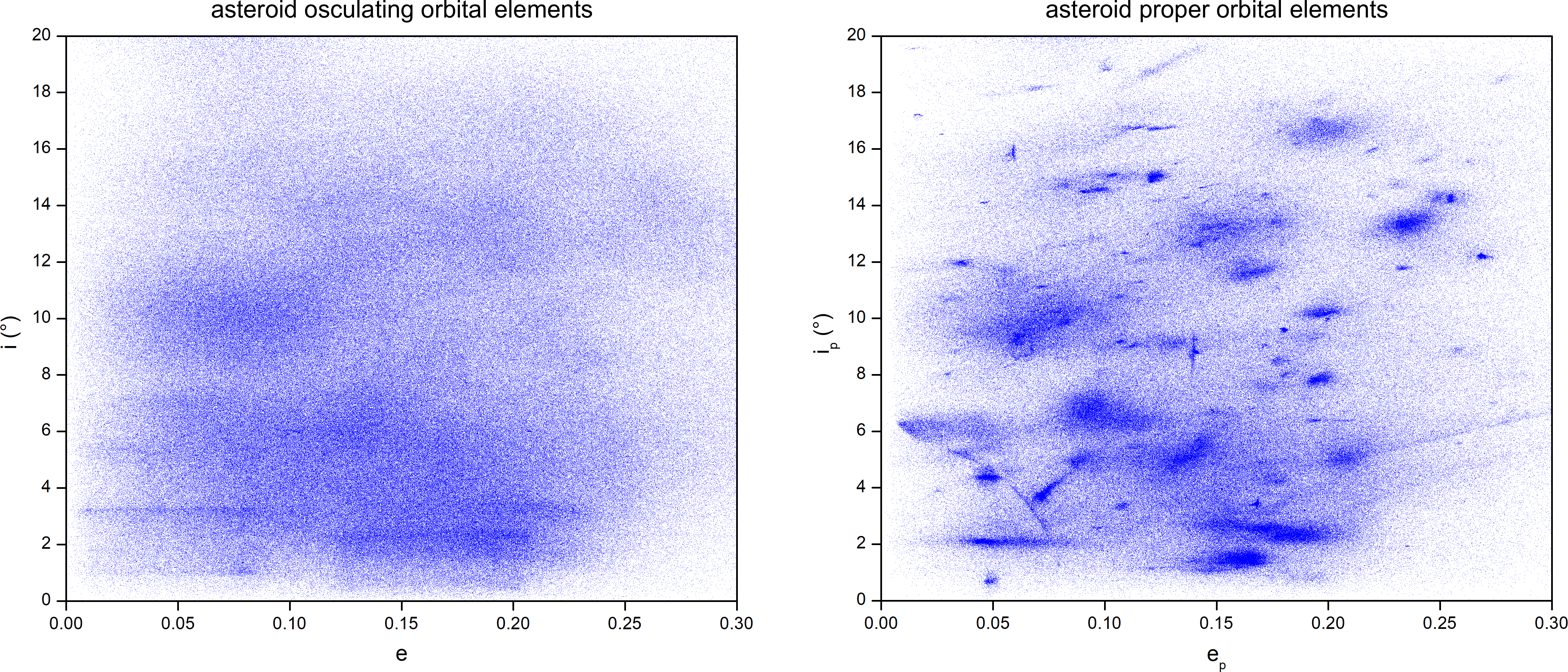
Comparison: osculating Keplerian orbital elements on the left (families indistinguishable) vs. proper elements on the right (families visible).

Strictly speaking, families and their membership are identified by analysing the proper orbital elements rather than the current osculating orbital elements, which regularly fluctuate on timescales of tens of thousands of years. The proper elements are related constants of motion that remain almost constant for at least tens of millions of years, and perhaps longer.

=== Membership ===
When the orbital elements of main belt asteroids are plotted (typically inclination vs. eccentricity, or vs. semi-major axis), a number of distinct concentrations are seen against the rather uniform distribution of non-family background asteroids. These concentrations are the asteroid families. Interlopers are asteroids classified as family members based on their so-called proper orbital elements but having spectroscopic properties distinct from the bulk of the family, suggesting that they, contrary to the true family members, did not originate from the same parent body that once fragmented upon a collisional impact.

=== Family types ===
As previously mentioned, families caused by an impact that did not disrupt the parent body but only ejected fragments are called cratering families. Other terminology has been used to distinguish various types of groups which are less distinct or less statistically certain from the most prominent "nominal families" (or clusters).

The term cluster is also used to describe a small asteroid family, such as the Karin cluster. Clumps are groupings which have relatively few members but are clearly distinct from the background (e.g. the Juno clump). Clans are groupings which merge very gradually into the background density and/or have a complex internal structure making it difficult to decide whether they are one complex group or several unrelated overlapping groups (e.g. the Flora family has been called a clan). Tribes are groups that are less certain to be statistically significant against the background either because of small density or large uncertainty in the orbital parameters of the members.

=== Hierarchical clustering method ===
Present day computer-assisted searches have identified more than a hundred asteroid families (see below). The most prominent algorithms have been the hierarchical clustering method (HCM), which looks for groupings with small nearest-neighbour distances in orbital element space, and wavelet analysis, which builds a density-of-asteroids map in orbital element space, and looks for density peaks.

The boundaries of the families are somewhat vague because at the edges they blend into the background density of asteroids in the main belt. For this reason the number of members even among discovered asteroids is usually only known approximately, and membership is uncertain for asteroids near the edges.

Additionally, some interlopers from the heterogeneous background asteroid population are expected even in the central regions of a family. Since the true family members caused by the collision are expected to have similar compositions, most such interlopers can in principle be recognised by spectral properties which do not match those of the bulk of family members. A prominent example is 1 Ceres, the largest asteroid, which is an interloper in the family once named after it (the Ceres family, now the Gefion family).

Spectral characteristics can also be used to determine the membership (or otherwise) of asteroids in the outer regions of a family, as has been used e.g. for the Vesta family, whose members have an unusual composition.

== List ==
=== Prominent families ===

- Nysa–Polana: 19,073 (4.8%)
- Vesta: 15,252 (3.8%)
- Flora: 13,786 (3.5%)
- Eos: 9,789 (2.5%)
- Koronis: 5,949 (1.5%)
- Eunomia: 5,670 (1.4%)
- Hygiea: 4,854 (1.2%)
- Themis: 4,782 (1.2%)
- Hungaria: 2,965 (0.7%)
- All other families: 21,500 (5.4%)
- Background: 295,000 (74.0%)
Distribution of the most prominent families, other families and background asteroids (up to number 398,000)

Among the many asteroid families, the following families are the most prominent ones in the asteroid belt. For the complete list, see below.

- The Eos family (adj. Eoan; 9,789 members, named after 221 Eos)
- The Eunomia family (adj. Eunomian; 5,670 known members, named after 15 Eunomia) is a family of S-type asteroids. It is the most prominent family in the intermediate asteroid belt and the 6th-largest family with approximately 1.4% of all main belt asteroids.
- The Flora family (adj. Florian; 13,786 members, named after 8 Flora) is the 3rd-largest family. Broad in extent, it has no clear boundary and gradually fades into the surrounding background population. Several distinct groupings within the family, possibly created by later, secondary collisions. It has also been described as an asteroid clan.
- The Hungaria family (adj. Hungarian; 2,965 members, named after 434 Hungaria)
- The Hygiea family (adj. Hygiean; 4,854 members, named after 10 Hygiea)
- The Koronis family (adj. Koronian; 5,949 members, named after 158 Koronis)
- The Nysa–Polana complex (19,073 members, a collection of overlapping asteroid families including the S- and X-type Hertha family and C-, B-, and F-type New Polana and Eulalia families.
- The Themis family (adj. Themistian; 4,782 members, named after 24 Themis)
- The Vesta family (adj. Vestian; 15,252 members, named after 4 Vesta)

=== All families ===
In 2015, a study identified 122 notable families with a total of approximately 100,000 member asteroids, based on the entire catalog of numbered minor planets, which consisted of almost 400,000 numbered bodies at the time (see catalog index for a current listing of numbered minor planets). The data has been made available at the "Small Bodies Data Ferret" website. The first column of this table contains the family identification number or family identifier number (FIN), which is an attempt for a numerical labeling of identified families, independent of their currently used name, as a family's name may change with refined observations, leading to multiple names used in literature and to subsequent confusion.

FIN	Family	Lbl	# of Members	Loc. (Note: "close" refers to asteroids inside the 9:2 resonance, "inner" refers to asteroids between the 9:2 and 4:1 resonance. A refers to between 4:1 and 3:1, B is 3:1 to 8:3, C is 8:3 to 5:2, D is 5:2 to 7:3, E is 7:3 to 9:4, F is 9:4 to 11:5, G is 11:5 to 2:1, "outer" refers to asteroids between the 2:1 and 11:6 resonance, and "rim" refers to asteroids beyond the 11:6 resonance.)	Taxonomy	mean- albedo	mean a	mean e	mean i	Parent body · Notes	Cat	LoMP
001	Hilda family	HIL	18	rim	C	0.04	3.965	0.174	8.92	153 Hilda; adj. Hildian; within the larger dynamical group with the same name. (a–e–i: 3.7–4.2 AU; > 0.07; < 20°)	cat	list
002	Schubart family	SHU	531	rim	C	0.03	3.966	0.191	2.92	1911 Schubart (within the dynamical Hilda group)	cat	list
003	Hungaria family	H	1870	close	E	0.35	1.944	0.078	20.87	434 Hungaria; located within the dynamical group of the same name. (a–e–i: 1.78–2.0 AU; < 0.18; 16°–34°)	cat	list
004	Hektor family	HEK	16	trojan (L4)	–	–	5.204	0.054	19.02	624 Hektor (Jupiter trojan)	cat	list
005	Eurybates family	ERY	197	trojan (L4)	C P	0.06	5.204	0.044	7.42	3548 Eurybates (Jupiter trojan)	cat	list
006	Thronium family	006	15	trojan (L4)	–	0.06	5.204	0.049	31.75	9799 Thronium (Jupiter trojan)	—	list
007	James Bond family (Note: This is a joke by Nesvorný et al. In their Table 2 the reference is to the 1995 film, GoldenEye.)	007	1	A	ASP	–	2.474	0.129	6.32	9007 James Bond	—	list
008	Arkesilaos family	ARK	37	trojan (L4)	–	–	5.204	0.029	8.89	20961 Arkesilaos (Jupiter trojan)	cat	list
009	Ennomos family	ENM	30	trojan (L5)	–	0.06	5.204	0.041	26.79	4709 Ennomos (Jupiter trojan)	cat	list
010	Shaulladany family	010	13	trojan (L5)	–	0.09	5.204	0.041	24.23	247341 Shaulladany (Jupiter trojan)	—	list
401	Vesta family	V	10612	A	V	0.35	2.362	0.099	6.36	4 Vesta (adj. Vestian)	cat	list
402	Flora family (Ariadne family)	FLO	13786	A	S	0.30	2.201	0.144	5.34	8 Flora (adj. Florian), also named after 43 Ariadne; typical asteroid clan. Not a legitimate asteroid family according to Carruba and Milani, instead, the Florian core region is labelled Belgica family and Duponta family (1338), respectively.	cat	list
403	Baptistina family	BAP	176	A	X	0.16	2.264	0.149	6.00	298 Baptistina, merges with the Belgica family (1052) at 100 m/s according to Carruba	cat	list
404	Massalia family	MAS	7820	A	S	0.22	2.409	0.162	1.42	20 Massalia, adj. Massalian, a-e-i: (2.37 to 2.45; 0.12 to 0.21; 0.4 to 2.4)	cat	list
405	Nysa–Polana complex (Hertha family; Eulalia family)	NYS	15983	A	SFC	0.28; 0.06	2.423	0.174	3.04	44 Nysa/142 Polana also known as the Hertha family (135 Hertha). Includes the Eulalia family (495 Eulalia)	cat	(44) (142)
406	Erigone family	ERI	1776	A	CX	0.06	2.367	0.210	4.74	163 Erigone, adj. Erigonian. Can be joined with the dynamically different Martes family into a single collisional family (Src).	cat	list
407	Clarissa family	CLA	236	A	X	0.05	2.406	0.107	3.35	302 Clarissa	cat	list
408	Sulamitis family	SUL	193	A	C	0.04	2.463	0.091	5.04	752 Sulamitis	cat	list
409	Lucienne family	LCI	142	A	S	0.22	2.462	0.111	14.51	1892 Lucienne	cat	list
410	Euterpe family	EUT	474	A	S	0.26	2.347	0.187	0.72	27 Euterpe	cat	list
411	Datura family	DAT	6	A	S	0.21	2.235	0.156	5.21	1270 Datura; Recently formed family with members: (60151), (90265), (203370), (215619) and (338309)	cat	list
412	Lucascavin family	LCA	3	A	S	–	2.281	0.127	5.20	21509 Lucascavin; members: (180255), (209570)	cat	list
413	Klio family	KLI	330	A	C	0.07	2.362	0.193	9.38	84 Klio	cat	list
414	Chimaera family	CIM	108	A	CX	0.06	2.460	0.155	14.65	623 Chimaera	cat	list
415	Chaldaea family (Salli family)	CHL	132	A	C	0.07	2.376	0.236	11.60	313 Chaldaea; alt. named after 1715 Salli by Masiero	cat	list
416	Svea family	SVE	48	A	CX	0.06	2.476	0.088	16.09	329 Svea	cat	list
417	unnamed family	417	9	A	–	–	2.465	0.153	3.93	(108138) 2001 GB11	—	list
701	Phocaea family	PHO	1248	A	S	0.22	2.400	0.228	23.41	25 Phocaea	cat	list
501	Juno family	JUN	1693	B	S	0.25	2.669	0.232	13.34	3 Juno (adj. Junonian)	cat	list
502	Eunomia family	EUN	9856	B	S	0.19	2.644	0.148	13.08	15 Eunomia	cat	list
504	Nemesis family (Liberatrix or Zdeněkhorský family)	NEM	1302	C	C	0.05	2.750	0.088	5.18	128 Nemesis (adj. Nemesian); also named after 58 Concordia (adj. Concordian) and 3827 Zdeněkhorský. Formerly Liberatrix family by Zappalà (1995) and Cellino (2002)	cat	list
505	Adeona family	ADE	2070	B	C	0.07	2.673	0.169	11.71	145 Adeona	cat	list
506	Maria family (Roma family)	MAR	2958	B	S	0.25	2.554	0.101	15.02	170 Maria; alternatively named after 472 Roma.	cat	list
507	Padua family (Lydia family)	PAD	1087	C	X	0.10	2.747	0.035	5.09	363 Padua; also known as Lydia family^{[C]} · 110 Lydia · adj. Paduan; Lydian	cat	list
508	Aeolia family	AEO	529	C	X	0.17	2.742	0.168	3.49	396 Aeolia	cat	list
509	Chloris family	CLO	120	C	C	0.06	2.727	0.255	9.23	410 Chloris, adj. Chloridian	cat	list
510	Misa family	MIS	647	B	C	0.03	2.658	0.178	2.26	569 Misa, adj. Misian	cat	list
511	Brangäne family	BRG	325	B	S	0.10	2.587	0.179	9.64	606 Brangäne	cat	list
512	Dora family	DOR	1742	C	C	0.05	2.797	0.198	7.83	668 Dora, adj. Dorian	cat	list
513	Merxia family	MRX	1263	C	S	0.23	2.745	0.133	4.85	808 Merxia, adj. Merxian	cat	list
514	Agnia family	AGN	3336	C	S	0.18	2.783	0.066	3.58	847 Agnia	cat	list
515	Astrid family	AST	548	C	C	0.08	2.788	0.048	0.66	1128 Astrid, adj. Astridian	cat	list
516	Gefion family (Ceres family; Minerva family)	GEF	2428	C	S	0.20	2.784	0.129	9.01	1272 Gefion, adj. Gefionian; a-e-i: (2.74 to 2.82; 0.08 to 0.18; 7.4 to 10.5); also known as Ceres family (adj. Cererian) after 1 Ceres; and Minerva (adj. Minervian) family after 93 Minerva (identified interloper)	cat	list
517	König family	KON	578	B	CX	0.04	2.571	0.139	8.85	3815 König	cat	list
518	Rafita family	RAF	775	B	S	0.25	2.547	0.173	7.74	1644 Rafita, adj. Rafitian (namesake is a suspected interloper; not listed in family); members (1587) and (1658)	cat	list
519	Hoffmeister family	HOF	2095	C	CF	0.04	2.787	0.047	4.36	1726 Hoffmeister	cat	list
520	Iannini family	IAN	150	B	S	0.32	2.644	0.267	12.19	4652 Iannini	cat	list
521	Kazuya family	KAZ	44	B	S	0.21	2.568	0.141	14.56	7353 Kazuya	cat	list
522	Ino family	INO	463	C	S	0.24	2.743	0.172	13.52	173 Ino	cat	list
523	Emilkowalski family	EMI	4	B	S	0.20	2.599	0.178	17.42	14627 Emilkowalski; members: (126761), (224559) and (256124)	cat	list
524	Brugmansia family	524	3	B	S	–	2.620	0.179	2.80	16598 Brugmansia; members: (190603) and (218697)	cat	list
525	Schulhof family	SHF	5	B	S	0.27	2.610	0.163	13.30	2384 Schulhof; members: (81337), (140600), (271044), (286239)	cat	list
526	unnamed family	526	81	C	C	0.06	2.721	0.173	14.35	(53546) 2000 BY6	—	list
527	Lorre family	LOR	2	C	C	0.05	2.747	0.263	28.18	5438 Lorre; other member: (208099)	cat	list
528	Leonidas family	LEO	111	B	CX	0.07	2.681	0.193	3.81	2782 Leonidas; identical to the Vibilia family: (529/VIB) (and listed as such); (4793)	cat	list
529	Vibilia family	VIB	180	B	C	0.06	2.655	0.191	3.82	144 Vibilia; namesake only listed in family by Zappalà, but not by Nesvorý; identical to the Leonidas family: LEO.	cat	list
530	Phaeo family	PAE	146	C	X	0.06	2.782	0.199	9.47	322 Phaeo	cat	list
531	Mitidika family	MIT	653	B	C	0.06	2.587	0.247	12.50	2262 Mitidika (not listed in family itself); members: (404) and (99)	cat	list
532	Henan family	HEN	1872	B	L	0.20	2.699	0.063	2.80	2085 Henan	cat	list
533	Hanna family	HNA	280	C	CX	0.05	2.807	0.180	4.17	1668 Hanna	cat	list
534	Karma family	KRM	59	B	CX	0.05	2.577	0.106	10.75	3811 Karma	cat	list
535	Witt family	WIT	1618	C	S	0.26	2.760	0.030	5.79	2732 Witt, alternatively named after 10955 Harig (AstDyS)	cat	list
536	Xizang family	XIZ	275	C	–	0.12	2.754	0.154	2.76	2344 Xizang	cat	list
537	Watsonia family	WAT	83	C	L	0.13	2.760	0.122	17.33	729 Watsonia	cat	list
538	Jones family (asteroids)	JNS	22	B	T	0.05	2.626	0.110	12.35	3152 Jones	cat	list
539	Aëria family	AER	272	B	X	0.17	2.649	0.056	11.76	369 Aeria	cat	list
540	Julia family (asteroids)	JUL	33	B	S	0.19	2.552	0.124	16.70	89 Julia	cat	list
541	Postrema family	POS	108	C	CX	0.05	2.738	0.242	16.53	1484 Postrema	cat	list
801	Pallas family	PAL	45	C	B	0.16	2.771	0.281	33.20	2 Pallas (adj. Palladian)	cat	list
802	Gallia family	GAL	137	C	S	0.17	2.771	0.132	25.16	148 Gallia	cat	list
803	Hansa family	HNS	1162	B	S	0.26	2.644	0.004	22.06	480 Hansa adj. Hansian; a-e-i: (~2.66; ~0.06; ~22.0°)	cat	list
804	Gersuind family	GER	415	B	S	0.15	2.589	0.175	17.34	686 Gersuind	cat	list
805	Barcelona family	BAR	346	B	S	0.25	2.637	0.251	30.83	945 Barcelona	cat	list
806	Tina family	TIN	107	C	X	0.34	2.793	0.082	20.76	1222 Tina	cat	list
807	Brucato family	BRU	41	B	CX	0.06	2.605	0.132	28.90	4203 Brucato	cat	list
601	Hygiea family	HYG	3145	G	CB	0.06	3.142	0.136	5.07	10 Hygiea	cat	list
602	Themis family	THM	5612	G	C	0.07	3.134	0.152	1.08	24 Themis (adj. Themistian)	cat	list
603	Sylvia family	SYL	191	rim	X	0.05	3.485	0.054	9.76	87 Sylvia; family within Cybele group	cat	list
604	Meliboea family	MEL	444	G	C	0.05	3.119	0.186	14.54	137 Meliboea, adj. Meliboean	cat	list
605	Koronis family (Lacrimosa family)	KOR	7390	D	S	0.15	2.869	0.045	2.15	158 Koronis, also named after 208 Lacrimosa	cat	list
606	Eos family	EOS	16038	E	K	0.13	3.012	0.077	9.94	221 Eos	cat	list
607	Emma family	EMA	577	F	C	0.05	3.046	0.113	9.09	283 Emma	cat	list
608	Brasilia family	BRA	845	D	X	0.18	2.862	0.127	14.98	293 Brasilia, adj. Brazilian (namesake is a suspected interloper; not listed in family)	cat	list
609	Veritas family	VER	2139	G	CPD	0.07	3.174	0.066	9.06	490 Veritas, adj. Veritasian; alt: Undina (Undinian) family after 92 Undina	cat	list
610	Karin family	KAR	541	D	S	0.21	2.864	0.044	2.10	832 Karin. Recently formed family located within the Koronis family.	cat	list
611	Naëma family	NAE	375	D	C	0.08	2.940	0.036	11.99	845 Naëma, adj. Naëmian	cat	list
612	Tirela family (Klumpkea family)	TIR	1815	G	S	0.07	3.116	0.195	17.06	1400 Tirela, alternatively named after 1040 Klumpkea (AstDyS)	cat	list
613	Lixiaohua family (Gantrisch family)	LIX	1241	G	CX	0.04	3.153	0.201	10.06	3556 Lixiaohua; although member 3330 Gantrisch is both larger and lower numbered (src)	cat	list
614	Telramund family (Klytaemnestra family)	TEL	513	E	S	0.22	2.993	0.066	8.81	9506 Telramund; alternatively named after 179 Klytaemnestra by Masiero and by Milani	cat	list
615	unnamed family	615	159	D	CX	0.17	2.848	0.106	9.14	(18405) 1993 FY12	—	list
616	Charis family	CHA	808	D	C	0.08	2.900	0.047	5.73	627 Charis	cat	list
617	Theobalda family	THB	574	G	CX	0.06	3.178	0.263	14.05	778 Theobalda, adj. Theobaldian; a-e-i: (3.16 to 3.19; 0.24 to 0.27; 14 to 15)	cat	list
618	Terentia family	TRE	80	D	C	0.07	2.932	0.072	11.11	1189 Terentia	cat	list
619	Lau family	LAU	56	D	S	0.27	2.929	0.195	6.30	10811 Lau	cat	list
620	Beagle family	BGL	148	G	C	0.09	3.155	0.154	1.34	656 Beagle. Recently formed family is located within the Themis family (all members are also listed as Themistians). Includes 7968 Elst–Pizarro.	cat	list
621	Koronis family (II)	K-2	246	D	S	0.14	2.869	0.045	2.15	158 Koronis "second family"	cat	list
622	Terpsichore family	TRP	138	D	C	0.05	2.854	0.182	8.23	81 Terpsichore	cat	list
623	Fringilla family	FIR	134	D	X	0.05	2.914	0.093	16.68	709 Fringilla	cat	list
624	Durisen family	DUR	27	D	X	0.04	2.943	0.185	16.19	5567 Durisen	cat	list
625	Yakovlev family	YAK	67	D	C	0.05	2.870	0.290	7.89	5614 Yakovlev	cat	list
626	San Marcello family	SAN	144	D	X	0.19	2.922	0.078	12.50	7481 San Marcello	cat	list
627	unnamed family	627	38	D	CX	0.05	2.868	0.219	16.02	(15454) 1998 YB3	—	list
628	unnamed family	628	248	D	S	0.10	2.850	0.081	5.12	(15477) 1999 CG1	—	list
629	unnamed family	629	58	D	A	0.21	2.939	0.118	10.73	(36256) 1999 XT17	—	list
630	Aegle family	AEG	120	F	CX	0.07	3.052	0.190	16.48	96 Aegle	cat	list
631	Ursula family	URS	731	G	CX	0.06	3.128	0.098	16.21	375 Ursula	cat	list
632	Elfriede family	ELF	97	G	C	0.05	3.189	0.061	15.87	618 Elfriede	cat	list
633	Itha family	ITH	54	D	S	0.23	2.866	0.158	12.27	918 Itha	cat	list
634	Inarradas family	INA	43	F	CX	0.07	3.050	0.184	14.51	3438 Inarradas	cat	list
635	Anfimov family	ANF	49	F	S	0.16	3.044	0.089	3.48	7468 Anfimov	cat	list
636	Marconia family	MRC	34	F	CX	0.05	3.063	0.097	2.58	1332 Marconia	cat	list
637	unnamed family	637	64	G	CX	0.05	3.109	0.180	3.46	(106302) 2000 UJ87	—	list
638	Croatia family	CRO	93	G	X	0.07	3.133	0.026	10.66	589 Croatia	cat	list
639	Imhilde family	IMH	43	E	CX	0.05	2.983	0.237	14.59	926 Imhilde	cat	list
640	Gibbs family	GBS	8	E	–	–	3.004	0.023	10.34	331P/Gibbs "P/2012 F5 (Gibbs)". Other members include (20674), (140429), and (177075)	—	—
641	Juliana family	JLI	76	E	CX	0.05	3.004	0.144	13.12	816 Juliana	cat	list
901	Euphrosyne family	EUP	1385	G	C	0.06	3.155	0.208	26.54	31 Euphrosyne	cat	list
902	Alauda family	ALA	1294	G	B	0.07	3.194	0.021	21.66	702 Alauda	cat	list
903	Ulla family	ULA	37	rim	X	0.05	3.543	0.050	17.96	909 Ulla; family within Cybele group	cat	list
904	Luthera family (Kartvelia family)	LUT	232	G	X	0.04	3.219	0.121	18.77	1303 Luthera; fam. is also named after 781 Kartvelia	cat	list
905	Armenia family	ARM	67	G	C	0.05	3.117	0.070	18.19	780 Armenia	cat	list

=== Other families or dynamical groups ===
Other asteroid families from miscellaneous sources (not listed in the above table), as well as non-asteroid families include:

Family	Parent	Cat	Description
Aemilia family	159 Aemilia	—	MBA-family (AstDys) according to Milani and Knežević (2014). Total of 62 members.
Alinda family	887 Alinda	cat	Alinda group described by projectpluto.com
Amneris family	871 Amneris	cat	Small family of 22 asteroids identified by Zappalà (1995). Most members have been assigned to the encompassing complex of the Flora family by Nesvorný (2014).
Anius family	8060 Anius	—	MBA-family (AstDys) according to Milani and Knežević (2014). Total of 31 members.
Ashkova family	3460 Ashkova	—	MBA-family (AstDys) according to Milani and Knežević (2014). Total of 59 members.
Astraea family	5 Astraea	cat	Large MBA-family (AstDys) according to Milani and Knežević (2014). Total of 6,169 members. Lowest-numbered members: (5), (91), (262), (355), (765) and (1121). Not a listed family by Zappalà (1995). Considered a HCM-artifact by Nesvorný (2014) due to a resonant alignment (z1 = g + s − g6 − s6 = 0).
Augusta family	254 Augusta	cat	Small family of 23 asteroids identified by Zappalà (1995). Most members have been assigned to the Flora family by Nesvorný (2014).
Ausonia family	63 Ausonia	—	Single member. Unsourced. Member of the Vesta family according to AstDyS-2 and Nesvorný (2014).
Bontekoe family	10654 Bontekoe	—	MBA-family (AstDys) according to Milani and Knežević (2014). Total of 13 members.
Brokoff family	6769 Brokoff	—	MBA-family (AstDys) according to Milani and Knežević (2014). Total of 58 members.
Bower family	1639 Bower	—	Micro-family with 10 members as per Zappalà (1995). Adj. Bowerian. Alternative name Endymion (Endymionian) family after 342 Endymion.^{[C]} All members: (1639), (3815), (8832), (14306), (15666), (22286), (32637), (85133), (120446) and (145685). This family corresponds in large parts with the König family by Nesvorný (2014).
Cindygraber family	7605 Cindygraber	—	MBA-family (AstDys) according to Milani and Knežević (2014). Total of 19 members.
Clematis family	1101 Clematis	cat	MBA-family (AstDys) according to Milani and Knežević (2014). Total of 17 members. Subset of the large Alauda family as per Nesvorný (2014). All members: (1101), (5360), (22044), (25982), (29963), (32240), (37628), (66174), (71688), (83362), (83790), (97516), (110030), (132961), (147858), (181960) and (223933).
Cybele group	65 Cybele	cat	Cybele group according to Asteroids, Meteorites, and Comets – by Linda T. Elkins-Tanton and projectpluto.com. Corresponding wiki-category lists a total of 32 members. Not a listed family in HCM by Zappalà (1995), Nesvorný (2014) and AstDyS-2 (Src), where these bodies are predominantly assigned to the background population.
Dejanira family	157 Dejanira	cat	Micro-family with 5 members as per Zappalà (1995). All members: (157), (2290), (5276), (10779) and (17377). All belong to the background population according to Nesvorný (2014).
Devine family	3561 Devine	—	MBA-family (AstDys) according to Milani and Knežević (2014). Total of 19 members.
Duponta family	1338 Duponta	—	MBA-family (AstDys) according to Milani and Knežević (2014). Total of 133 members.
Epeios family	2148 Epeios	—	Jupiter trojan family according to Roig and Gil-Hutton (2008). Part of the Menelaus clan.
Eumelos family	5436 Eumelos	—	Jupiter trojan family according to Roig and Gil-Hutton (2008). Part of the Menelaus clan.
Euryalos family	4007 Euryalos	—	Jupiter trojan family according to Roig and Gil-Hutton (2008). Part of the Menelaus clan.
Faïna family	751 Faïna	cat	Carbonaceous family with 12 identified members as per Zappalà (1995). All members: (751), (2089), (2420), (3637), (3904), (5083), (8087), (10741), (10744), (11497), (12975) and (29086). Predominantly background population with 3 bodies belonging to the stony Maria family per Nesvorný (2014). Not a listed family at AstDyS-2 (Src)
Griqua group	1362 Griqua	cat	Griqua group (not a collisional family) described by projectpluto.com. A marginally unstable group of asteroids observed in the 2 :1 resonance with Jupiter.
Hanskya family	1118 Hanskya	—	MBA-family (AstDys) according to Milani and Knežević (2014). Total of 116 members.
Haumea family	Haumea (dwarf planet)	cat	This is a TNO-family. As of 2017, and current categorization, the family consists of 10 members (including parent body).^{[D]}
Helio family	895 Helio	—	MBA-family (AstDys) according to Milani and Knežević (2014). Total of 50 members.
Hestia family	46 Hestia	cat	Nesvorný moved family (formerly FIN 503) to candidate status, and (46) to background. Also background according to Milani and Knežević (AstDyS-2).
Higson family	3025 Higson	—	MBA-family (AstDys) according to Milani and Knežević (2014). Total of 17 members.
Hippasos family	17492 Hippasos	—	MBA-family (AstDys) according to Milani and Knežević (2014). Total of 7 members.
Huberta family	260 Huberta	—	MBA-family (AstDys) according to Milani and Knežević (2014). Total of 26 members. Nesvorný moved family to candidate status.
Kalchas family	4138 Kalchas	—	Jupiter trojan family according to Roig and Gil-Hutton (2008). Part of the Menelaus clan.
Laodica family	507 Laodica	cat	Category with 2 members. 507 Laodica and 635 Vundtia are core members of the Eos family according to AstDyS-2 (507; 635) and background asteroid per Nesvorný (507; 635), respectively.
Levin family	2076 Levin	—	MBA-family (AstDys) according to Milani and Knežević (2014). Total of 1534 members.
Liberatrix family	125 Liberatrix	cat	3 listed members. 125 Liberatrix is a background asteroid according to AstDyS-2, and a member of the Nemesis family according to Nesvorný. Background asteroid: 301 Bavaria (both AstDyS-2 and Nesvorný). 9923 Ronaldthiel is a core member of the Agnia family at AstDyS-2.
Makhaon family	3063 Makhaon	—	Jupiter trojan family according to Roig and Gil-Hutton (2008). Part of the Menelaus clan.
Marsili family	40134 Marsili	—	MBA-family (AstDys) according to Milani and Knežević (2014). Total of 16 members.
Martes family	5026 Martes	cat	MBA-family (AstDys) according to Milani and Knežević (2014). Total of 481 members. Largest asteroids are members of the Erigone family according to Nesvorný (5026; 9879).
Matterania family	883 Matterania	—	MBA-family (AstDys) according to Milani and Knežević (2014). Total of 169 members.
Mecklenburg family	6124 Mecklenburg	—	MBA-family (AstDys) according to Milani and Knežević (2014). Total of 78 members.
Melanthios family	12973 Melanthios	—	Jupiter trojan family according to Roig and Gil-Hutton (2008). Part of the Menelaus clan.
Menelaus family	1647 Menelaus	—	Jupiter trojan family according Milani (1993). Part of the Menelaus clan according to Roig and Gil-Hutton (2008).
Nele family	1547 Nele	—	MBA-family (AstDys) according to Milani and Knežević (2014). Total of 344 members.
Nocturna family	1298 Nocturna	—	MBA-family (AstDys) according to Milani and Knežević (2014). Total of 186 members.
Nohavica family	6539 Nohavica	cat	Previously known as the "1982 QG" family. Second member: (9935) 1986 CP1; both are background asteroids according to AstDyS-2 and Nesvorný.
Podarkes family	13062 Podarkes	—	Jupiter trojan family according to Roig and Gil-Hutton (2008). Part of the Menelaus clan.
Prokne family	194 Prokne	—	MBA-family (AstDys) according to Milani and Knežević (2014). Total of 379 members.
Reginita family	1117 Reginita	cat	Claimed subgroup of the Flora family. Background asteroid according to both AstDyS-2 and Nesvorný.
Sinden family	10369 Sinden	—	MBA-family (AstDys) according to Milani and Knežević (2014). Total of 24 members.
Takehiro family	8737 Takehiro	—	MBA-family (AstDys) according to Milani and Knežević (2014). Total of 57 members. Nesvorný moved family to candidate status.
Telamon family	1749 Telamon	—	Jupiter trojan family according to Roig and Gil-Hutton (2008). Part of the Menelaus clan.
Traversa family	5651 Traversa	—	MBA-family (AstDys) according to Milani and Knežević (2014). Total of 56 members.
Univermoscow family	6355 Univermoscow	—	MBA-family (AstDys) according to Milani and Knežević (2014). Total of 13 members.
Zhvanetskij family	5931 Zhvanetskij	—	MBA-family (AstDys) according to Milani and Knežević (2014). Total of 23 members.
Legend: ^{C} These are families listed as "robustly" identified in Bendjoya and Zappala (2002).; ^{D} TNOs are not considered asteroids, but are included here for completeness.; Candidate families (Nesvorný): 929 Algunde, 1296 Andrée, 1646 Rosseland, 1942 Jablunka, 2007 McCuskey, 2409 Chapman, 4689 Donn, 6246 Komurotoru. (13698) 1998 KF_{35}, 539 Pamina, (300163) 2006 VW139, 3567 Alvema, (7744) 1986 QA1 260 Huberta, 928 Hildrun, 2621 Goto, 1113 Katja, 8737 Takehiro, 46 Hestia, 5 Astraea, 1044 Teutonia, 3110 Wagman, 4945 Ikenozenni, (7744) 1986 QA1, 8905 Bankakuko, (25315) 1999 AZ8, (28804) 2000 HC_{81}.

== See also ==
- Proper orbital elements
- Collisional family
- Category:Asteroid groups and families
