= 468 Lina =

Main-belt asteroid

Discovery
- Discovered by: M. F. Wolf
- Discovery site: Heidelberg Obs.
- Discovery date: 18 January 1901

Designations
- Pronunciation: German: [ˈliːnaː]
- Named after: (household employee)
- Alternative designations: 1901 FZ · A915 PA; A918 EB
- Minor planet category: main-belt · Themis

Orbital characteristics
- Epoch 16 February 2017 (JD 2457800.5)
- Uncertainty parameter 0
- Observation arc: 115.81 yr (42,300 days)
- Aphelion: 3.7509 AU
- Perihelion: 2.5136 AU
- Semi-major axis: 3.1323 AU
- Eccentricity: 0.1975
- Orbital period (sidereal): 5.54 yr (2,025 days)
- Mean anomaly: 64.042°
- Mean motion: 0° 10^{m} 40.08^{s} / day
- Inclination: 0.4371°
- Longitude of ascending node: 21.472°
- Argument of perihelion: 333.20°

Physical characteristics
- Dimensions: 58.60±14.75 km 59.7±0.5 km 59.80±0.89 km 60.238±0.518 km 63.4±12.7 km 64.592±1.981 km 66±7 km 69.34±2.5 km (IRAS:6)
- Synodic rotation period: 16.33±0.02 h 16.478±0.004 h 16.54±0.01 h
- Geometric albedo: 0.0430±0.003 (IRAS:6); 0.0495±0.0094; 0.05±0.01; 0.05±0.02; 0.057±0.009; 0.058; 0.059±0.002; 0.06±0.01; 0.06±0.06
- Spectral type: Tholen = CPF · P · CPF; B–V = 0.660; U–B = 0.313
- Absolute magnitude (H): 9.61 · 9.70±0.25 · 9.77 · 9.83

468 Lina, provisional designation 1901 FZ, is a dark Themistian asteroid from the outer region of the asteroid belt, approximately 60 kilometers (37 miles) in diameter. It was discovered on 18 January 1901, by German astronomer Max Wolf at the Heidelberg Observatory in southwest Germany. The carbonaceous asteroid was named for the housemaid of the discoverer's family.

== Classification and orbit ==
Lina is a core member of the Themis family, an ancient population of carbonaceous outer-belt asteroids with nearly coplanar ecliptical orbits. It orbits the Sun at a distance of 2.5–3.8 AU once every 5 years and 6 months (2,025 days). Its orbit has an eccentricity of 0.20 and an inclination of 0.4° with respect to the ecliptic. Lina was first observed at Heidelberg a few days prior to its official discovery observation. The body's observation arc begins with its identification as 1915 PA at Heidelberg in 1915, or 14 years after its official discovery observation.

== Naming ==
This minor planet was named for "Lina", a domestic housemaid of the discoverer's family at Heidelberg. The members of Max Wolf's household figure prominently in the names of his discoveries, but background information on the name's origin behind most of them have been lost. Wolf also named 482 Petrina and 483 Seppina after the household's two dogs, a practice that was later discouraged by the IAU. Naming citation for Lina was first mentioned in The Names of the Minor Planets by Paul Herget in 1955 (H 51).

== Physical characteristics ==
It has been characterized as a CPF-type and P-type asteroid by Tholen and NEOWISE, respectively.

=== Photometry ===
In December 2006, a rotational lightcurve of Lina was obtained by American astronomer Robert Buchheim at Altimira Observatory (G76) in California. Light-curve analysis gave a rotation period of 16.33 hours with a brightness variation of 0.15 magnitude (U=3). Its odd light curve shows multiple peaks, contrary to the classically shaped double-peaks seen in bimodal light curves, that have two maximums and two minimums per rotation. Lina's unusual triple-peak shape made it difficult to fit a period.

Other photometric observations were taken by Edward Tedesco in the 1970s (8.3 hours; Δ mag; U=1), by Pierre Antonini and Raoul Behrend in January 2006 (16.478 hours; Δ0.18 mag; U=2), and by Scott Marks and Michael Fauerbach in February 2007 (16.54 hours; Δ0.13 mag; U=2).

=== Diameter and albedo ===
According to the space-based surveys carried out by the Infrared Astronomical Satellite IRAS, the Japanese Akari satellite, the Spitzer Space Telescope, and NASA's Wide-field Infrared Survey Explorer with its subsequent NEOWISE mission, Lina measures between 58.60 and 69.34 kilometers in diameter, and its surface has an albedo between 0.043 and 0.06.

The Collaborative Asteroid Lightcurve Link still adopts the results obtained by IRAS, that is an albedo of 0.043 and a diameter of 69.34 kilometers at an absolute magnitude of 9.83, while more recent results by NEOWISE and Spitzer tend toward a higher albedo of 0.06 and a shorter diameter of 58.60 and 59.7 kilometer, respectively. Spitzer's spectra of Lina shows an emissivity plateau in the wavelength range of 9 to 12 μm, which is indicative of silicates.
