= Rotraut =

Rotraut is a German given name. Notable people with this name include:

- Rotraut Klein-Moquay (born 1938), German-French artist
- Rotraut Richter (1915–1947), a German stage and film actress
- Rotraut Susanne Berner (born 1948), a German graphic designer and illustrator
- Rotraut Wisskirchen (1936–2018), a German Biblical archaeologist

== See also ==
- 874 Rotraut, a main-belt asteroid
- Schön Rotraut, ballad by German poet Eduard Mörike (1804–1875)
