= Ilsebill =

Ilsebill may refer to:

- An opera by Friedrich Klose
- 919 Ilsebill, an asteroid
