= Les Hôpitaux-Neufs =

- Commune
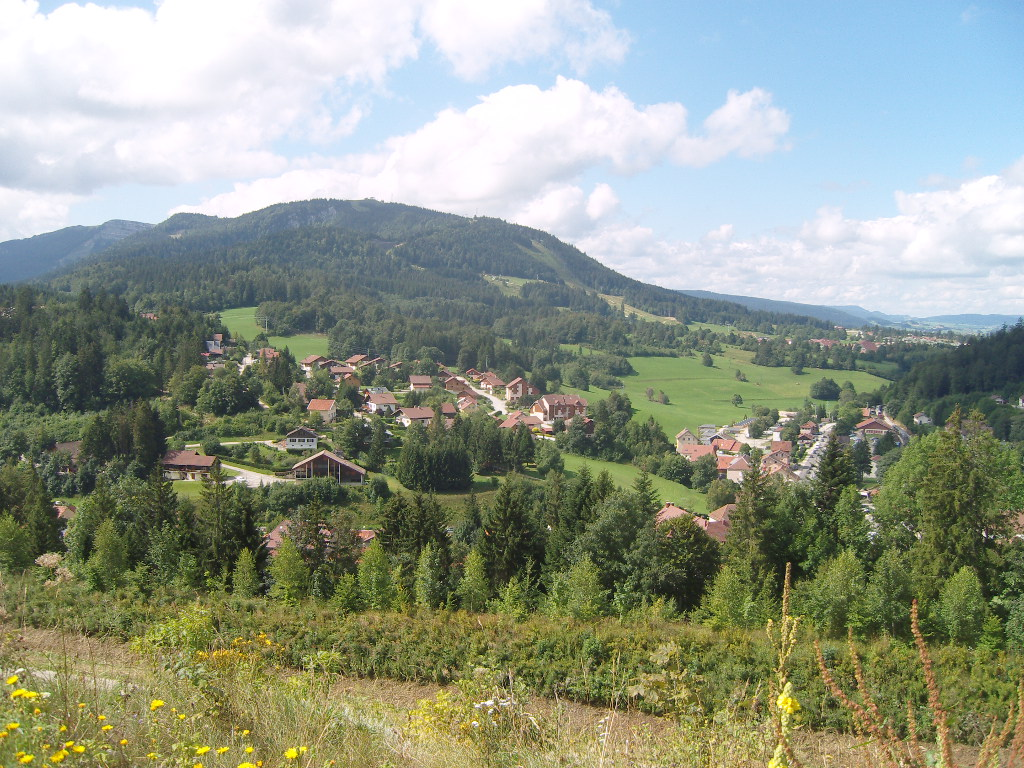
- A general view of Les Hôpitaux-Neufs
- Location of Les Hôpitaux-Neufs
- Location within France Location within Bourgogne-Franche-Comté
- Coordinates: 46°46′38″N 6°22′25″E
- Country: France
- Region: Bourgogne-Franche-Comté
- Department: Doubs
- Arrondissement: Pontarlier
- Canton: Frasne
- Intercommunality: Lacs et Montagnes du Haut-Doubs

Government
  - Mayor (2023–2026): Philippe Boyer
- Area^{1}: 6.56 km^{2} (2.53 sq mi)
- Highest elevation: 1,290 m (4,230 ft)
- Lowest elevation: 970 m (3,180 ft)
- Population (2023): 967
  - Density: 147/km^{2} (382/sq mi)
- Time zone: UTC+01:00 (CET)
  - Summer (DST): UTC+02:00 (CEST)
- INSEE/Postal code: 25307 /25370
- ^{1} French Land Register data, which excludes lakes, ponds, glaciers > 1 km^{2} (0.386 sq mi or 247 acres) and river estuaries.

Les Hôpitaux-Neufs is a commune in the Doubs department in the Bourgogne-Franche-Comté region in eastern France.

== Geography ==
The commune is situated 17 km (11 mi) southeast of Pontarlier on the road through the Jura Mountains. International traffic passes through the commune on Route 57, and only a few farms have retained their typical rural quality. North of the village, Route 57 passes over the col des Hôpitaux-Neufs at 1046 m. This pass is the continental divide between the watersheds of the Rhine and the Rhône rivers.

The village is situated at 1000 m. between the massif of the Mont-d'Or on the south and the Herba on the north. The land of the commune is primarily pasture and forest.

== History ==
The commune goes back to the hospital established in the 13th century by Jean de Châlons-d'Arlay, Count of Burgundy. The village received its present name in 1780.

The church built in 1368 was burned down by Swedish troops during the 30 Years' War and restored in the 17th century in Renaissance Italian style. A baroque bell tower was added in 1694.

Until 30 September 1807, the parish belonged to the diocese of Lausanne. It was then incorporated into the diocese of Besançon.

== Population ==
Historical population
Year	Pop.	±% p.a.
1968	285	—
1975	295	+0.49%
1982	265	−1.52%
1990	369	+4.23%
1999	508	+3.62%
2007	708	+4.24%
2012	787	+2.14%
2017	921	+3.19%
2023	967	+0.82%
Source: INSEE

== See also ==
- Les Hôpitaux-Vieux
- Communes of the Doubs department
