= Arbona =

Arbona may refer to:

- Arbona, Basque name of Arbonne, France
- Arbona, alternate name of Abnoba, hills in Germany
