= NGC 4189 =

Galaxy in the constellation Coma Berenices

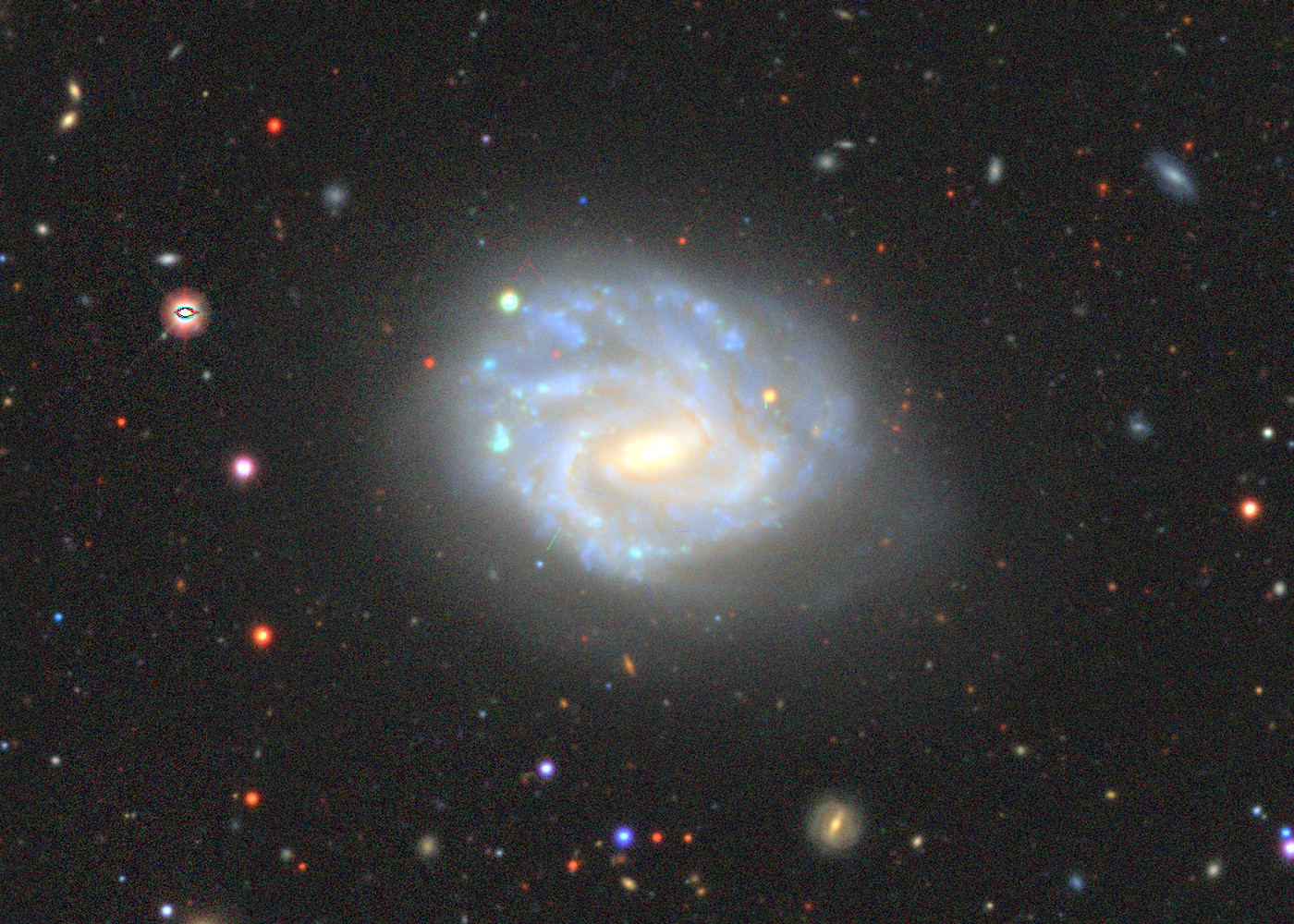
- NGC 4189 imaged by Legacy Surveys

Observation data (J2000 epoch)
- Constellation: Coma Berenices
- Right ascension: 12^{h} 13^{m} 47.2668^{s}
- Declination: +13° 25′ 29.074″
- Redshift: 0.006997±0.0000110
- Heliocentric radial velocity: 2,098±3 km/s
- Distance: 97.63 ± 4.63 Mly (29.935 ± 1.419 Mpc)
- Group or cluster: M88 group (LGG 285)
- Apparent magnitude (V): 12.5B

Characteristics
- Type: SAB(rs)cd
- Size: ~103,700 ly (31.78 kpc) (estimated)
- Apparent size (V): 2.4′ × 1.7′

Other designations
- VCC 89, IRAS 12112+1342, 2MASX J12134727+1325294, IC 3050, UGC 7235, MCG +02-31-054, PGC 39025, CGCG 069-092

NGC 4189 is an intermediate spiral galaxy in the constellation of Coma Berenices. Its velocity with respect to the cosmic microwave background is 2,432±24 km/s, which corresponds to a Hubble distance of 117.0 ± 8.3 Mly (35.88 ± 2.54 Mpc). However, 20 non-redshift measurements give a closer mean distance of 97.63 ± 4.63 Mly (29.935 ± 1.419 Mpc). It was discovered by German-British astronomer William Herschel on 8 April 1784. It was also observed by German astronomer Arnold Schwassmann on 16 November 1900, and added to the Index Catalogue as IC 3050.

NGC 4189 has a possible active galactic nucleus, i.e. it has a compact region at the center of a galaxy that emits a significant amount of energy across the electromagnetic spectrum, with characteristics indicating that this luminosity is not produced by the stars.

== M88 group ==
According to A.M. Garcia, NGC 4189 is a member of the M88 group (also known as LGG 285). This group of galaxies contains at least 44 members, of which 17 appear in the New General Catalogue and 18 in the Index Catalogue.

== Supernovae ==
Two supernovae have been observed in NGC 4189:

- SN 1966E (type unknown, mag. 15.5) was discovered by Swiss astronomer Paul Wild on 12 July 1966.
- SN 2026ahvi (Type Ia, mag. 16.1) was discovered by Japanese amateur astronomer Kōichi Itagaki on 2 November 2026.

== See also ==
- List of NGC objects (4001–5000)
