= Preziosa =

Preziosa may refer to:

- 529 Preziosa, a star
- The daughter in the story The She-bear
- MSC Preziosa, a cruise ship
