= NGC 4411 =

Galaxy in the constellation Virgo

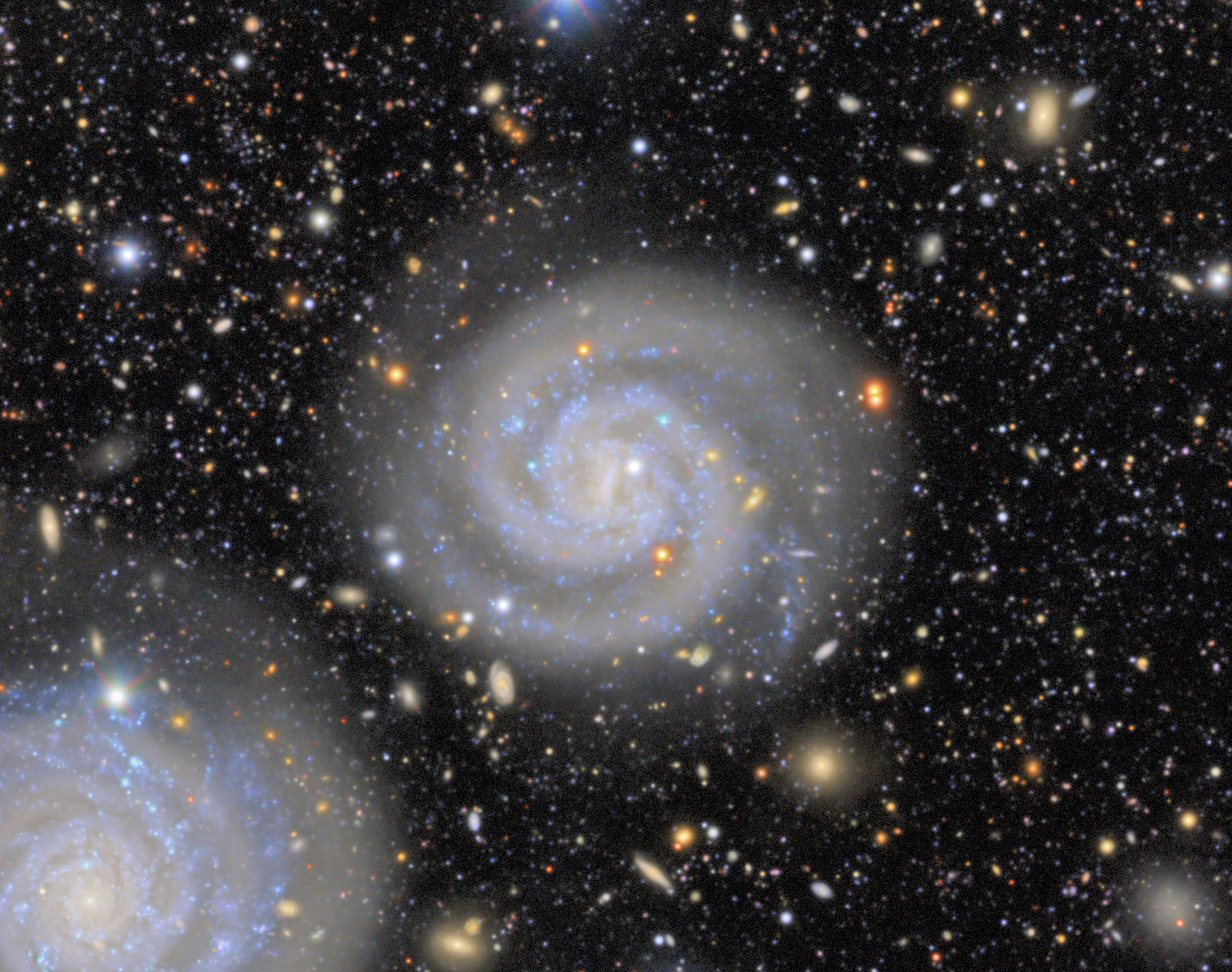
- NGC 4411 imaged by the Vera C. Rubin Observatory

Observation data (J2000 epoch)
- Constellation: Virgo
- Right ascension: 12^{h} 26^{m} 29.9337^{s}
- Declination: +08° 52′ 19.121″
- Redshift: 0.004263±0.000002
- Heliocentric radial velocity: 1,278±1 km/s
- Distance: 51.66 ± 4.59 Mly (15.840 ± 1.408 Mpc)
- Group or cluster: Virgo Cluster
- Apparent magnitude (V): 13.41

Characteristics
- Type: SB(rs)c
- Size: ~34,600 ly (10.60 kpc) (estimated)
- Apparent size (V): 2.0′ × 1.9′

Other designations
- KPG 336A, NGC 4411A, IC 3339, UGC 7537, MCG +02-32-048, PGC 040695, CGCG 070-074

NGC 4411 (also known as NGC 4411A) is a barred spiral galaxy in the constellation of Virgo. Its velocity with respect to the cosmic microwave background is 1,616±24 km/s, which corresponds to a Hubble distance of 77.7 ± 5.5 Mly (23.83 ± 1.70 Mpc). However, five non-redshift measurements give a closer distance of 51.66 ± 4.59 Mly (15.840 ± 1.408 Mpc). It was discovered by German–American astronomer Christian Heinrich Friedrich Peters in 1881. It was also observed by German astronomer Friedrich Karl Arnold Schwassmann on 23 January 1900, resulting in it being listed in the Index Catalogue as IC 3339. There was a longstanding confusion of identification between this galaxy and the neighboring spiral galaxy NGC 4411B.

NGC 4411 and NGC 4411B form a pair of galaxies, referred to as KPG 336. Both galaxies are members of the Virgo Cluster.

== See also ==
- List of NGC objects (4001–5000)
