= Elisabetha =

Elisabetha may refer to:

- 412 Elisabetha, an asteroid
- The historical name of Lokutu, Democratic Republic of the Congo
