= 456 Abnoba =

Main-belt asteroid

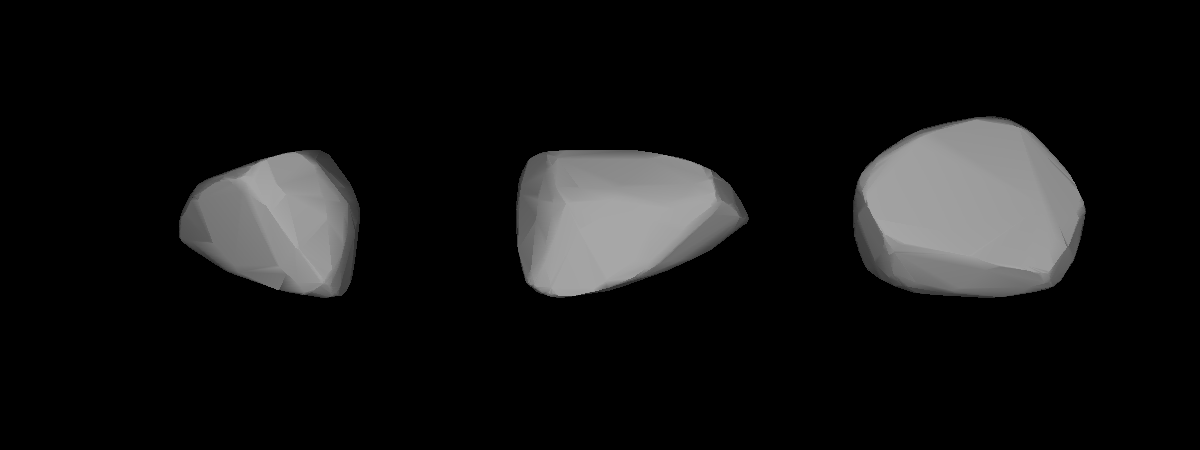
- Lightcurve-based 3D-model of 456 Abnoba.

Discovery
- Discovered by: M. F. Wolf; A. Schwassmann
- Discovery site: Heidelberg Obs.
- Discovery date: 4 June 1900

Designations
- Pronunciation: /ˈæbnəbə/
- Named after: Abnoba (Celtic mythology)
- Alternative designations: 1900 FH · 1952 YF
- Minor planet category: main-belt · (middle) background
- Symbol: (Astronomical)

Orbital characteristics
- Epoch 4 September 2017 (JD 2458000.5)
- Uncertainty parameter 0
- Observation arc: 117.07 yr (42,761 days)
- Aphelion: 3.2873 AU
- Perihelion: 2.2894 AU
- Semi-major axis: 2.7884 AU
- Eccentricity: 0.1789
- Orbital period (sidereal): 4.66 yr (1,701 days)
- Mean anomaly: 86.313°
- Mean motion: 0° 12^{m} 42.12^{s} / day
- Inclination: 14.439°
- Longitude of ascending node: 229.21°
- Argument of perihelion: 6.6794°

Physical characteristics
- Dimensions: 37.64±1.44 km 37.713±0.222 km 39.76±3.6 km 39.94 km (derived); 42.65±0.65 km 50.495±1.215 km
- Synodic rotation period: 18±1 h 18.2026±0.0002 h 18.273±0.005 h (Note: Lightcurve plot of 456 Abnoba, Palmer Divide Observatory, Brian D. Warner (2010) with a period of 18.273 hours. Summary figures at the LCDB); 18.281±0.001 h
- Geometric albedo: 0.1467±0.0261; 0.204±0.008; 0.2335±0.048; 0.2537 (derived); 0.286±0.033
- Spectral type: SMASS = S S
- Absolute magnitude (H): 9.10 · 9.20

456 Abnoba, provisional designation 1900 FH, is a stony background asteroid from the central regions of the asteroid belt, approximately 40 kilometers in diameter. It was discovered on 4 June 1900, by astronomers Max Wolf and Arnold Schwassmann at the Heidelberg-Königstuhl State Observatory in southwest Germany. The asteroid was named after the Celtic deity Abnoba.

== Orbit and classification ==
Abnoba is a non-family asteroid from the main belt's background population. It orbits the Sun in the central main-belt at a distance of 2.3–3.3 AU once every 4 years and 8 months (1,701 days). Its orbit has an eccentricity of 0.18 and an inclination of 14° with respect to the ecliptic.

The body's observation arc begins at Bordeaux Observatory, eleven days after its official discovery observation at Heidelberg.

== Physical characteristics ==
In the SMASS classification, Abnoba is a stony S-type asteroid. Its stony composition was also confirmed by polarimetric observations in 2017.

=== Rotation period ===
Several rotational lightcurves of Abnoba have been obtained from photometric observations since 2004. Analysis of the best-rated lightcurve from the Bigmuskie Observatory (B88) in Italy, gave a rotation period of 18.281 hours with a brightness amplitude of 0.32 magnitude (U=3).

=== Diameter and albedo ===
According to the surveys carried out by the Infrared Astronomical Satellite IRAS, the Japanese Akari satellite and the NEOWISE mission of NASA's Wide-field Infrared Survey Explorer, Abnoba measures between 37.64 and 50.495 kilometers in diameter and its surface has an albedo between 0.1467 and 0.286.

The Collaborative Asteroid Lightcurve Link derives an albedo of 0.2537 and a diameter of 39.94 kilometers based on an absolute magnitude of 9.1.

456 Abnoba has been observed to occult 6 stars between 2006 and 2023.

== Naming ==
This minor planet was named after the Gaulish goddess Abnoba from Celtic mythology. The goddess was worshipped in the Black Forest of southern Germany, and known as "Diana Abnoba" to the Roman troops stationed in this region. The official naming citation was authored by Lutz D. Schmadel based on his own research.
