= 448 Natalie =

Main-belt asteroid

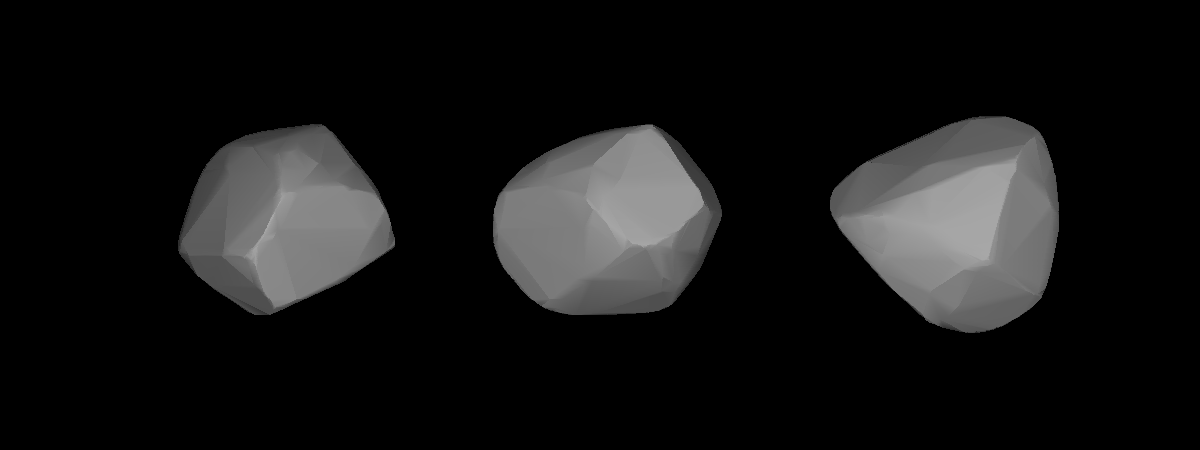
- Lightcurve-base 3D-model of 448 Natalie.

Discovery
- Discovered by: M. F. Wolf; A. Schwassmann
- Discovery date: 27 October 1899

Designations
- Pronunciation: German: [ˈnaːtaːliː]
- Alternative designations: 1899 ET
- Minor planet category: Main belt

Orbital characteristics
- Epoch 31 July 2016 (JD 2457600.5)
- Uncertainty parameter 0
- Observation arc: 115.66 yr (42244 d)
- Aphelion: 3.7213 AU (556.70 Gm)
- Perihelion: 2.54854 AU (381.256 Gm)
- Semi-major axis: 3.13492 AU (468.977 Gm)
- Eccentricity: 0.18705
- Orbital period (sidereal): 5.55 yr (2027.4 d)
- Mean anomaly: 28.073°
- Mean motion: 0° 10^{m} 39.252^{s} / day
- Inclination: 12.725°
- Longitude of ascending node: 37.286°
- Argument of perihelion: 294.160°

Physical characteristics
- Dimensions: 47.76±1.7 km
- Synodic rotation period: 8.0646 h (0.33603 d)
- Geometric albedo: 0.0588±0.004
- Absolute magnitude (H): 10.30

448 Natalie is a typical Main belt asteroid.

It was discovered by Max Wolf and A. Schwassmann on 27 October 1899 in Heidelberg.

Analysis of the light curve generated from photometric data collected during its 2010 opposition show a rotation period of 8.0646±0.0004 h with a brightness variation of 0.32±0.04 in magnitude.
