= 454 Mathesis =

Main-belt asteroid

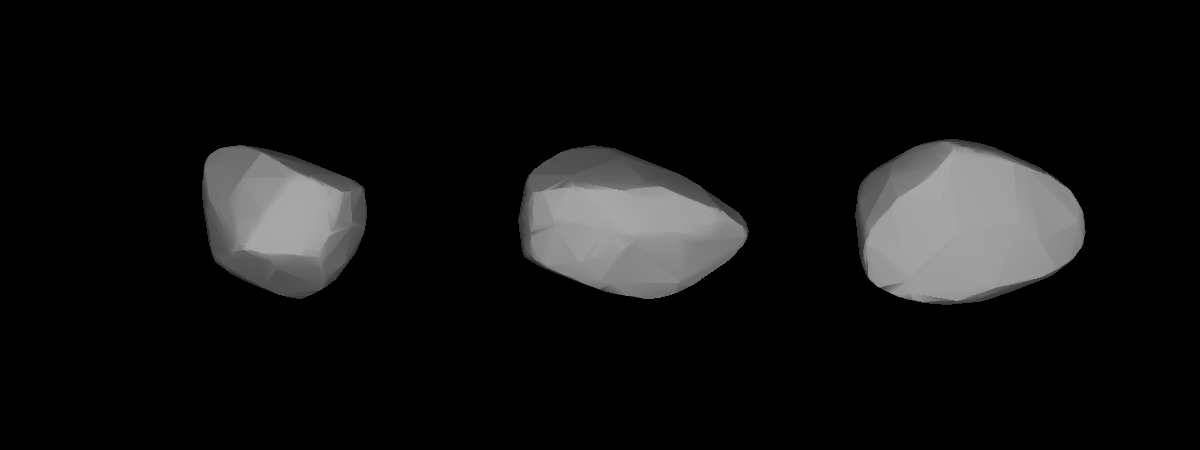
- Lightcurve-base 3D-model of 454 Mathesis.

Discovery
- Discovered by: Friedrich Karl Arnold Schwassmann
- Discovery site: Heidelberg (024)
- Discovery date: 28 March 1900

Designations
- Pronunciation: /məˈθiːsɪs/
- Named after: mathematics
- Alternative designations: 1900 FC
- Minor planet category: main belt

Orbital characteristics
- Epoch 31 July 2016 (JD 2457600.5)
- Uncertainty parameter 0
- Observation arc: 116.05 yr (42387 d)
- Aphelion: 2.9158 AU (436.20 Gm)
- Perihelion: 2.3409 AU (350.19 Gm)
- Semi-major axis: 2.6284 AU (393.20 Gm)
- Eccentricity: 0.10937
- Orbital period (sidereal): 4.26 yr (1556.4 d)
- Mean anomaly: 98.12293°
- Mean motion: 0° 13^{m} 52.679^{s} / day
- Inclination: 6.29209869841666°
- Longitude of ascending node: 32.29958°
- Argument of perihelion: 177.3387°

Physical characteristics
- Dimensions: 81.57±3.2 km
- Mass: (5.2±1.3)×10^{17} kg (Note: Calculated from its standard gravitational parameter GM = 0.035±0.009 km^{3}/s^{2}.)
- Mean density: 1.84 g/cm^{3} (Note: Assuming a diameter of 81.7 km.)
- Synodic rotation period: 8.378 h (0.3491 d)
- Geometric albedo: 0.0555±0.005
- Absolute magnitude (H): 9.20

454 Mathesis is a main-belt asteroid that was discovered by German astronomer Friedrich Karl Arnold Schwassmann on March 28, 1900. Its provisional name was 1900 FC.

Photometric observations of this asteroid at the Altimira Observatory in 2004 gave a light curve with a period of 8.37784 ± 0.00003 hours and a brightness variation of 0.32 in magnitude. This differs from periods of 7.075 hours reported in 1994 and 7.745 hours in 1998.
