= 905 Universitas =

Asteroid

Discovery
- Discovered by: A. Schwassmann
- Discovery site: Bergedorf
- Discovery date: 30 October 1918

Designations
- Pronunciation: /juːnɪˈvɜːrsɪtæs/
- Alternative designations: 1918 ES; 1961 WE

Orbital characteristics
- Epoch 31 July 2016 (JD 2457600.5)
- Uncertainty parameter 0
- Observation arc: 97.47 yr (35600 days)
- Aphelion: 2.5561 AU (382.39 Gm)
- Perihelion: 1.8751 AU (280.51 Gm)
- Semi-major axis: 2.2156 AU (331.45 Gm)
- Eccentricity: 0.15367
- Orbital period (sidereal): 3.30 yr (1204.6 d)
- Mean anomaly: 240.325°
- Mean motion: 0° 17^{m} 55.896^{s} / day
- Inclination: 5.3261°
- Longitude of ascending node: 37.179°
- Argument of perihelion: 343.300°
- Earth MOID: 0.877341 AU (131.2483 Gm)
- Jupiter MOID: 2.8967 AU (433.34 Gm)
- T_{Jupiter}: 3.633

Physical characteristics
- Mean radius: 10.665±1.2 km
- Synodic rotation period: 14.238 h (0.5933 d)
- Geometric albedo: 0.0849±0.022
- Absolute magnitude (H): 11.59

905 Universitas is an S-type asteroid orbiting in the Main belt as part of the Flora family. Its diameter is about 21 km and it has an albedo of 0.085. Its rotation period is approximately 14.2 hours.
