= 447 Valentine =

Large Main belt asteroid

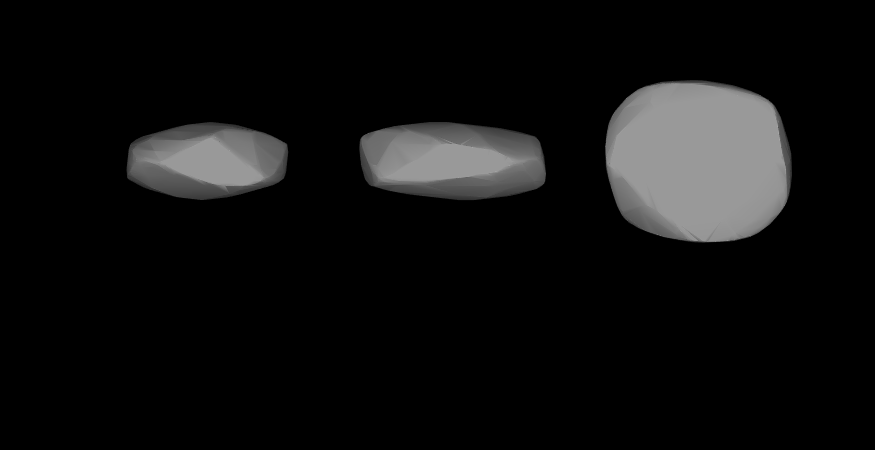
- Lightcurve-base 3D-model of 447 Valentine.

Discovery
- Discovered by: M. F. Wolf; A. Schwassmann
- Discovery date: 27 October 1899

Designations
- Alternative designations: 1899 ES
- Minor planet category: Main belt

Orbital characteristics
- Epoch 31 July 2016 (JD 2457600.5)
- Uncertainty parameter 0
- Observation arc: 121.46 yr (44363 d)
- Aphelion: 3.11615 AU (466.169 Gm)
- Perihelion: 2.85330 AU (426.848 Gm)
- Semi-major axis: 2.98472 AU (446.508 Gm)
- Eccentricity: 0.044033
- Orbital period (sidereal): 5.16 yr (1883.5 d)
- Mean anomaly: 218.145°
- Mean motion: 0° 11^{m} 28.097^{s} / day
- Inclination: 4.79460°
- Longitude of ascending node: 71.8375°
- Argument of perihelion: 322.874°

Physical characteristics
- Dimensions: 79.22±3.2 km
- Mass: (7.5±2.5)×10^{17} kg (Note: Calculated from its standard gravitational parameter GM = 0.050±0.017 km^{3}/s^{2}.)
- Mean density: 2.30 g/cm^{3} (Note: Assuming a diameter of 85.2 km.)
- Synodic rotation period: 9.651 h (0.4021 d)
- Geometric albedo: 0.0714±0.006
- Absolute magnitude (H): 8.99

447 Valentine is a large Main belt asteroid.

It was discovered by Max Wolf and A. Schwassmann on 27 October 1899 in Heidelberg.
