= 455 Bruchsalia =

Main-belt asteroid

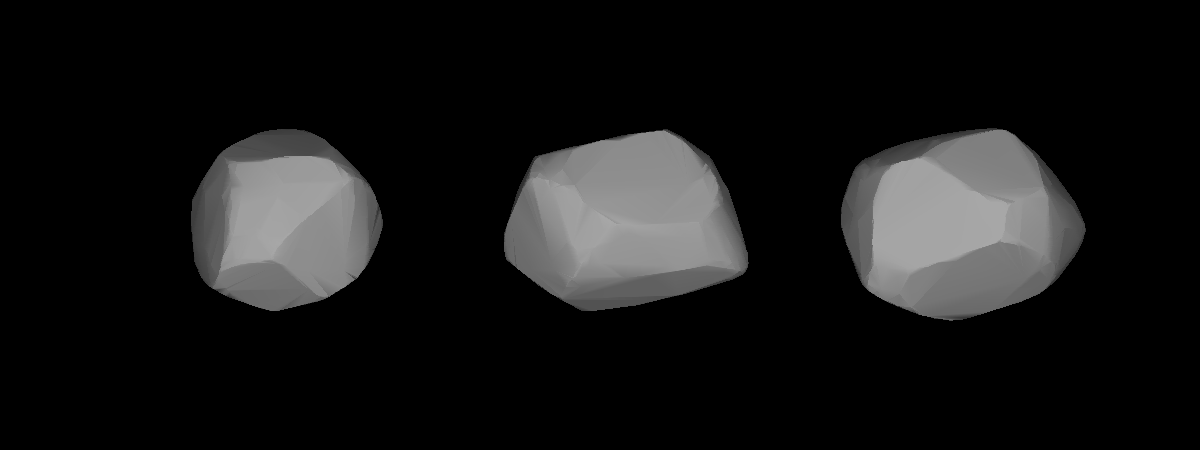
- Lightcurve-base 3D-model of 455 Bruchsalia.

Discovery
- Discovered by: M. F. Wolf; F. Schwassmann
- Discovery date: 22 May 1900

Designations
- Pronunciation: /brʌkˈseɪliə/
- Alternative designations: 1900 FG

Orbital characteristics
- Epoch 31 July 2016 (JD 2457600.5)
- Uncertainty parameter 0
- Observation arc: 115.90 yr (42331 d)
- Aphelion: 3.4395 AU (514.54 Gm)
- Perihelion: 1.8786 AU (281.03 Gm)
- Semi-major axis: 2.6590 AU (397.78 Gm)
- Eccentricity: 0.29351
- Orbital period (sidereal): 4.34 yr (1583.7 d)
- Mean anomaly: 220.10°
- Mean motion: 0° 13^{m} 38.316^{s} / day
- Inclination: 12.003°
- Longitude of ascending node: 76.174°
- Argument of perihelion: 273.22°

Physical characteristics
- Dimensions: 88.13 ± 6.89 km (composite estimate); 84.41±5.0 km
- Mass: (8.39±0.45)×10^{17} kg (Note: Calculated from its standard gravitational parameter GM = 0.056±0.003 km^{3}/s^{2}.)
- Mean density: 2.30 g/cm^{3} (Note: Assuming a diameter of 88.8 km.)
- Synodic rotation period: 11.85 h (0.494 d)
- Geometric albedo: 0.0709±0.009
- Absolute magnitude (H): 9.0

455 Bruchsalia is a main-belt asteroid. It was discovered by Max Wolf and Friedrich Karl Arnold Schwassmann on May 22, 1900. Its provisional name was 1900 FG.
