= Les Hôpitaux-Vieux =

- Commune
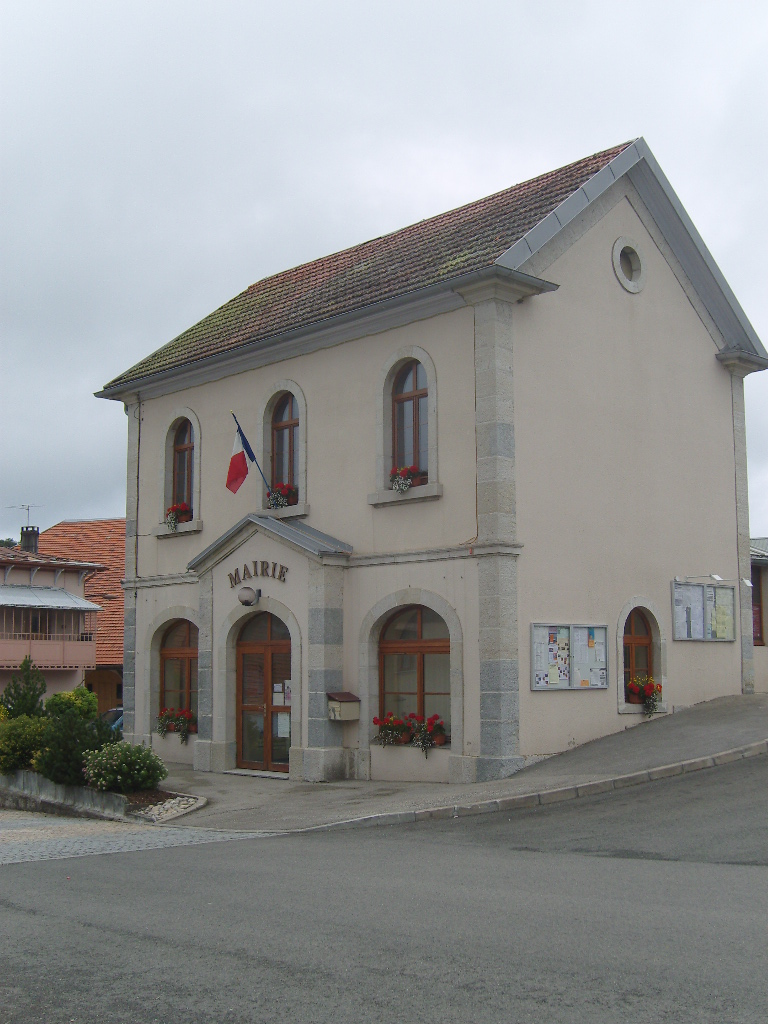
- Town hall

- Coat of arms
- Location of Les Hôpitaux-Vieux
- Location within France Location within Bourgogne-Franche-Comté
- Coordinates: 46°47′24″N 6°22′03″E
- Country: France
- Region: Bourgogne-Franche-Comté
- Department: Doubs
- Arrondissement: Pontarlier
- Canton: Frasne

Government
  - Mayor (2020–2026): Louis Poix
- Area^{1}: 14.21 km^{2} (5.49 sq mi)
- Highest elevation: 1,300 m (4,300 ft)
- Lowest elevation: 959 m (3,146 ft)
- Population (2023): 462
  - Density: 32.5/km^{2} (84.2/sq mi)
- Time zone: UTC+01:00 (CET)
  - Summer (DST): UTC+02:00 (CEST)
- INSEE/Postal code: 25308 /25370
- ^{1} French Land Register data, which excludes lakes, ponds, glaciers > 1 km^{2} (0.386 sq mi or 247 acres) and river estuaries.

Les Hôpitaux-Vieux (French pronunciation: [le.z‿opito vjø]) is a commune in the Doubs département in the Bourgogne-Franche-Comté region in eastern France.

== Geography ==
The commune is situated on the Roman road from Besançon to Italy.

The highest point in the commune is the Mont de l'Herba at 1303 m.

== History ==
The history of the commune is linked to Jean de Chalon, Duke of Burgundy. He established a hospital, initially designed to treat the wounded in battle, and later to combat leprosy and the plague, which raged from 1346 to 1349.

The two names, Hôpitaux-Vieux and Hôpitaux-Neufs, first appear in a document from 1393.

The village was entirely destroyed in July 1639 in the Thirty Years' War. As late as 1688, there were still only 37 homes that had been rebuilt.

The village did not have its own church until 1664, but was dependent on the parish of Saint-Maurice.

== Population ==
Historical population
Year	Pop.	±% p.a.
1968	141	—
1975	140	−0.10%
1982	170	+2.81%
1990	245	+4.67%
1999	257	+0.53%
2007	343	+3.67%
2012	392	+2.71%
2017	450	+2.80%
2023	462	+0.44%
Source: INSEE

== Economy ==
Agriculture was the principal activity in the commune until the end of the 20th century, when tourism became significant due to the construction of the ski resort of Métabief-Mont d'Or.

== See also ==
- Les Hôpitaux-Neufs
- Communes of the Doubs department
