= 436 Patricia =

Main-belt asteroid

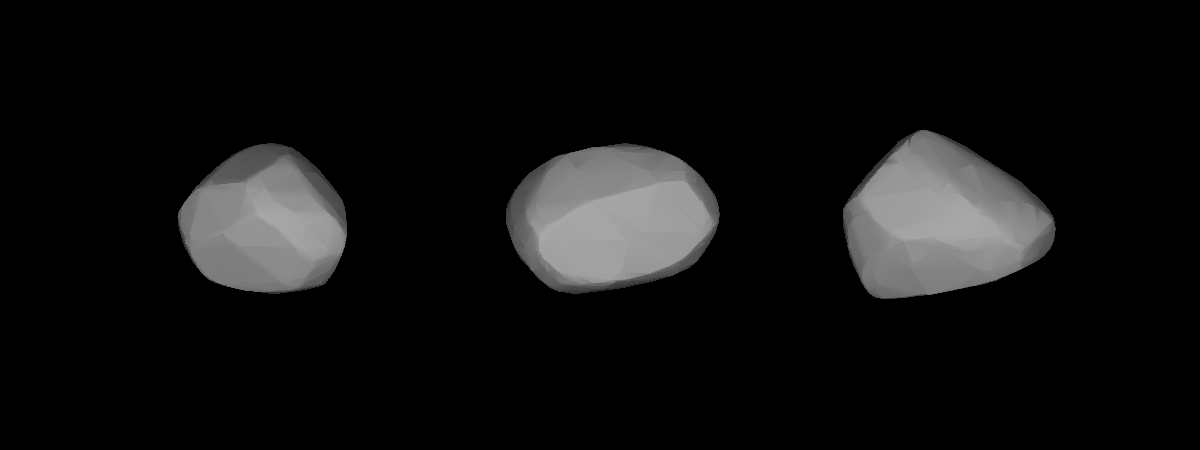
- A three-dimensional model of 436 Patricia based on its light curve

Discovery
- Discovered by: M. F. Wolf; A. Schwassmann
- Discovery date: 13 September 1898

Designations
- Alternative designations: 1898 DT
- Minor planet category: Main belt

Orbital characteristics
- Epoch 31 July 2016 (JD 2457600.5)
- Uncertainty parameter 0
- Observation arc: 117.57 yr (42944 d)
- Aphelion: 3.41751 AU (511.252 Gm)
- Perihelion: 2.98579 AU (446.668 Gm)
- Semi-major axis: 3.20165 AU (478.960 Gm)
- Eccentricity: 0.067422
- Orbital period (sidereal): 5.73 yr (2092.5 d)
- Mean anomaly: 181.995°
- Mean motion: 0° 10^{m} 19.362^{s} / day
- Inclination: 18.5096°
- Longitude of ascending node: 351.343°
- Argument of perihelion: 41.1947°

Physical characteristics
- Dimensions: 59.53±4.2 km
- Synodic rotation period: 16.133 h (0.6722 d)
- Geometric albedo: 0.0599±0.009
- Absolute magnitude (H): 10.0

436 Patricia is a large Main belt asteroid.

It was discovered by Max Wolf and A. Schwassmann on 13 September 1898 in Heidelberg.
