= 450 Brigitta =

Main-belt asteroid

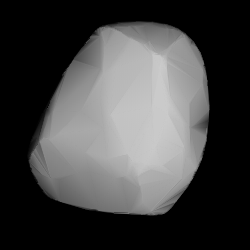
- Modelled shape of Brigitta from its lightcurve

Discovery
- Discovered by: M. F. Wolf; A. Schwassmann
- Discovery date: 10 October 1899

Designations
- Pronunciation: German: [brɪˈɡɪtaː]
- Alternative designations: 1899 EV
- Minor planet category: Main belt (Eos)

Orbital characteristics
- Epoch 31 July 2016 (JD 2457600.5)
- Uncertainty parameter 0
- Observation arc: 116.51 yr (42557 d)
- Aphelion: 3.31399 AU (495.766 Gm)
- Perihelion: 2.72067 AU (407.006 Gm)
- Semi-major axis: 3.01733 AU (451.386 Gm)
- Eccentricity: 0.098320
- Orbital period (sidereal): 5.24 yr (1914.4 d)
- Mean anomaly: 125.651°
- Mean motion: 0° 11^{m} 16.976^{s} / day
- Inclination: 10.1548°
- Longitude of ascending node: 14.4643°
- Argument of perihelion: 356.379°

Physical characteristics
- Dimensions: 33.32±1.3 km
- Synodic rotation period: 10.75 h (0.448 d)
- Geometric albedo: 0.1229±0.010
- Absolute magnitude (H): 10.2

450 Brigitta is a typical Main belt asteroid. It is a member of the Eos family.

It was discovered by Max Wolf and A. Schwassmann on 10 October 1899 in Heidelberg.
