= 443 Photographica =

Main-belt asteroid

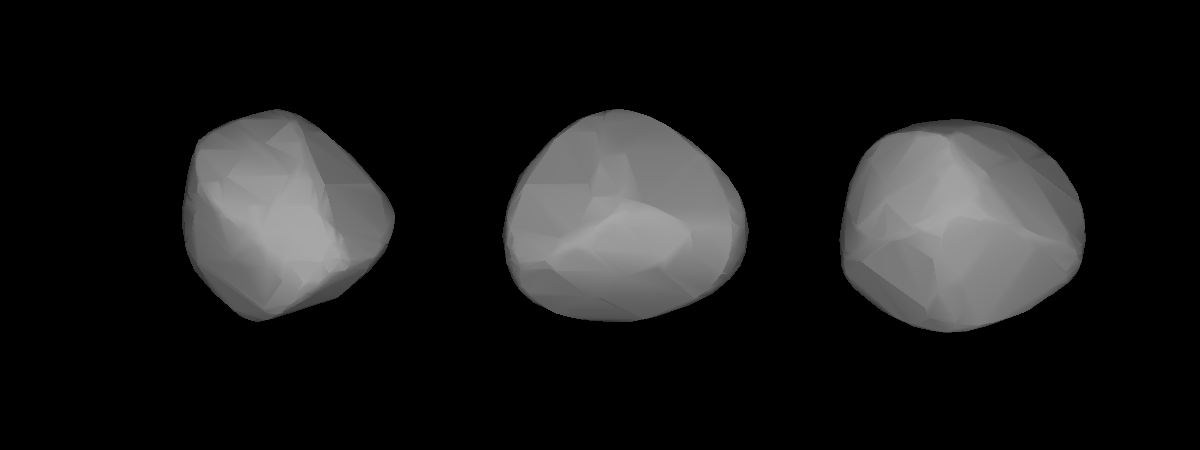
- Lightcurve-base 3D-model of 443 Photographica.

Discovery
- Discovered by: M. F. Wolf; A. Schwassmann
- Discovery date: 17 February 1899

Designations
- Pronunciation: /foʊtəˈɡræfɪkə/
- Named after: Photography
- Alternative designations: 1899 EF
- Minor planet category: Main belt

Orbital characteristics
- Epoch 31 July 2016 (JD 2457600.5)
- Uncertainty parameter 0
- Observation arc: 116.56 yr (42572 d)
- Aphelion: 2.30450 AU (344.748 Gm)
- Perihelion: 2.12676 AU (318.159 Gm)
- Semi-major axis: 2.21563 AU (331.454 Gm)
- Eccentricity: 0.040110
- Orbital period (sidereal): 3.30 yr (1204.6 d)
- Mean anomaly: 208.995°
- Mean motion: 0° 17^{m} 55.871^{s} / day
- Inclination: 4.23568°
- Longitude of ascending node: 175.447°
- Argument of perihelion: 349.449°

Physical characteristics
- Dimensions: 26.68±1.6 km
- Synodic rotation period: 19.795 h (0.8248 d)
- Geometric albedo: 0.1918±0.025
- Spectral type: S
- Absolute magnitude (H): 10.28

443 Photographica is a typical Main belt asteroid. It is classified as an S-type asteroid.

It was discovered by Max Wolf and A. Schwassmann on 17 February 1899 in Heidelberg.
