= 435 Ella =

Main-belt asteroid

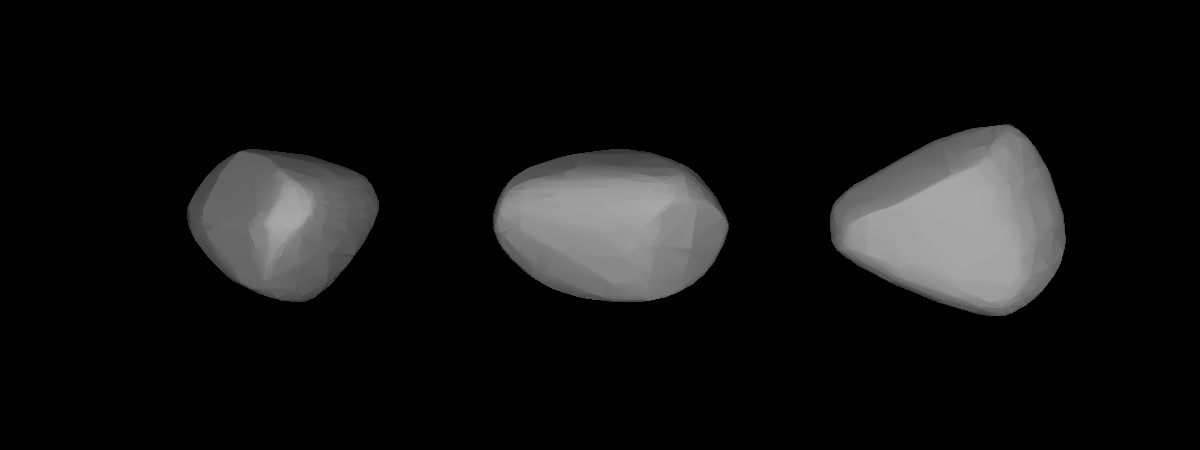
- A three-dimensional model of 435 Ella based on its light curve

Discovery
- Discovered by: M. F. Wolf; A. Schwassmann
- Discovery date: 11 September 1898

Designations
- Alternative designations: 1898 DS
- Minor planet category: Main belt

Orbital characteristics
- Epoch 31 July 2016 (JD 2457600.5)
- Uncertainty parameter 0
- Observation arc: 117.60 yr (42955 d)
- Aphelion: 2.8297 AU (423.32 Gm)
- Perihelion: 2.0688 AU (309.49 Gm)
- Semi-major axis: 2.4492 AU (366.40 Gm)
- Eccentricity: 0.15533
- Orbital period (sidereal): 3.83 yr (1400.1 d)
- Mean anomaly: 265.450°
- Mean motion: 0° 15^{m} 25.668^{s} / day
- Inclination: 1.8168°
- Longitude of ascending node: 23.192°
- Argument of perihelion: 333.682°

Physical characteristics
- Dimensions: 41.49±1.5 km
- Synodic rotation period: 4.623 h (0.1926 d)
- Geometric albedo: 0.0831±0.006
- Absolute magnitude (H): 10.23

435 Ella is a typical Main belt asteroid. It was discovered by Max Wolf and A. Schwassmann on 11 September 1898 in Heidelberg. This is the eponymous member of a proposed asteroid family with at least 15 members.

Photometric observations during 1995 show a rotation period of 4.264 hours. 435 Ella is classified as a DCX-type asteroid.
