= EL Aquilae =

1927 nova in the constellation Aquila

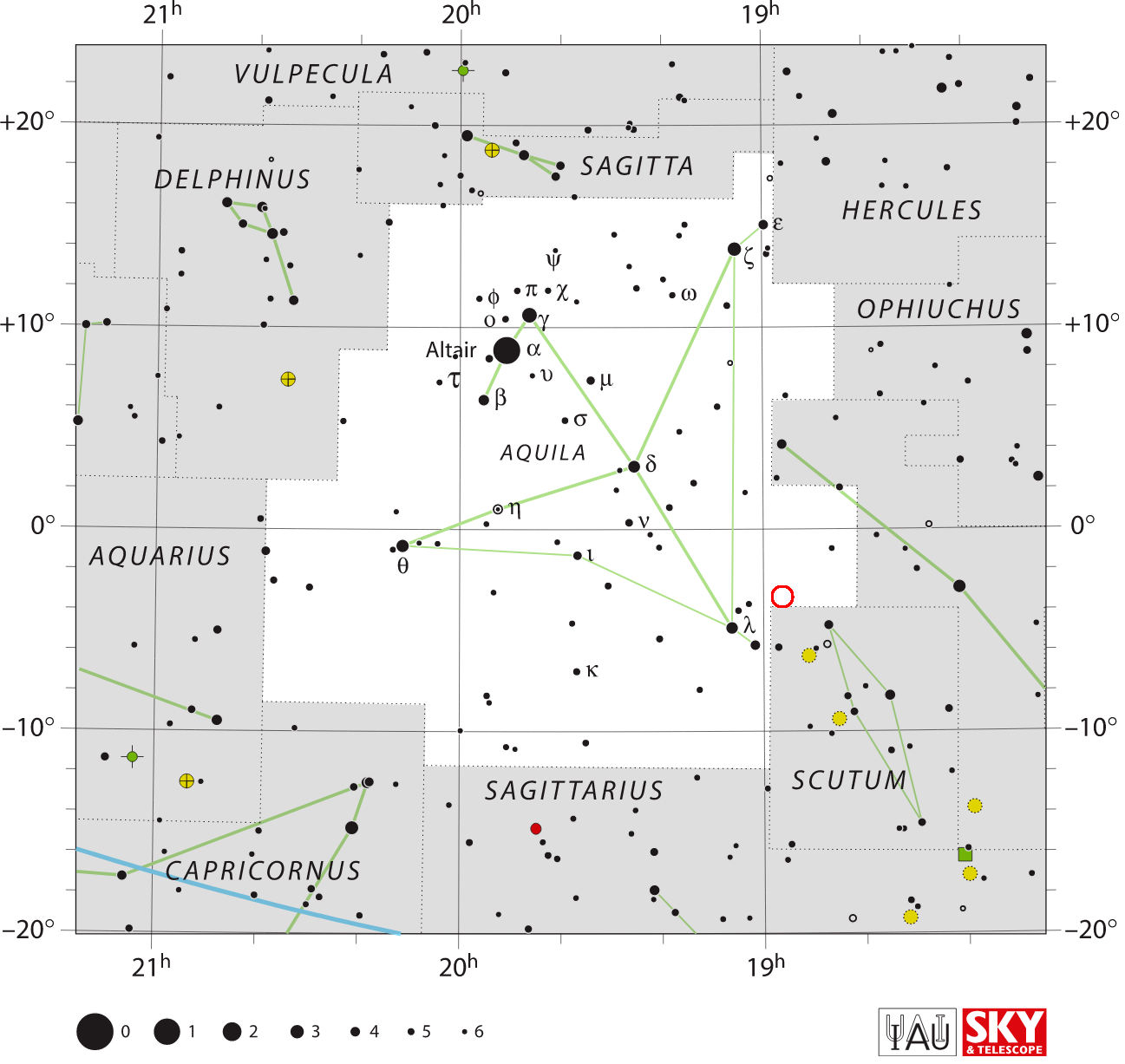
- Location of EL Aquilae (circled in red)

Observation data Epoch J2000 Equinox ICRS
- Constellation: Aquila
- Right ascension: 18^{h} 56^{m} 02.030^{s} (Note: The identification of the nova with this object is disputed, and it may actually be a fainter star several arc-seconds away)
- Declination: −03° 19′ 20.43″
- Apparent magnitude (V): 6.4 Max. 20.9 Min.

Characteristics
- Variable type: Classical Nova

Astrometry
Proper motion (μ)	RA: −2.236 mas/yr Dec.: −6.157 mas/yr
Parallax (π)	0.1601±0.0779 mas
Distance	approx. 20,000 ly (approx. 6,000 pc)

Other designations
- Nova Aql 1927, AAVSO 1850-03, Gaia DR2 4255780873390406528

Database references
SIMBAD	data

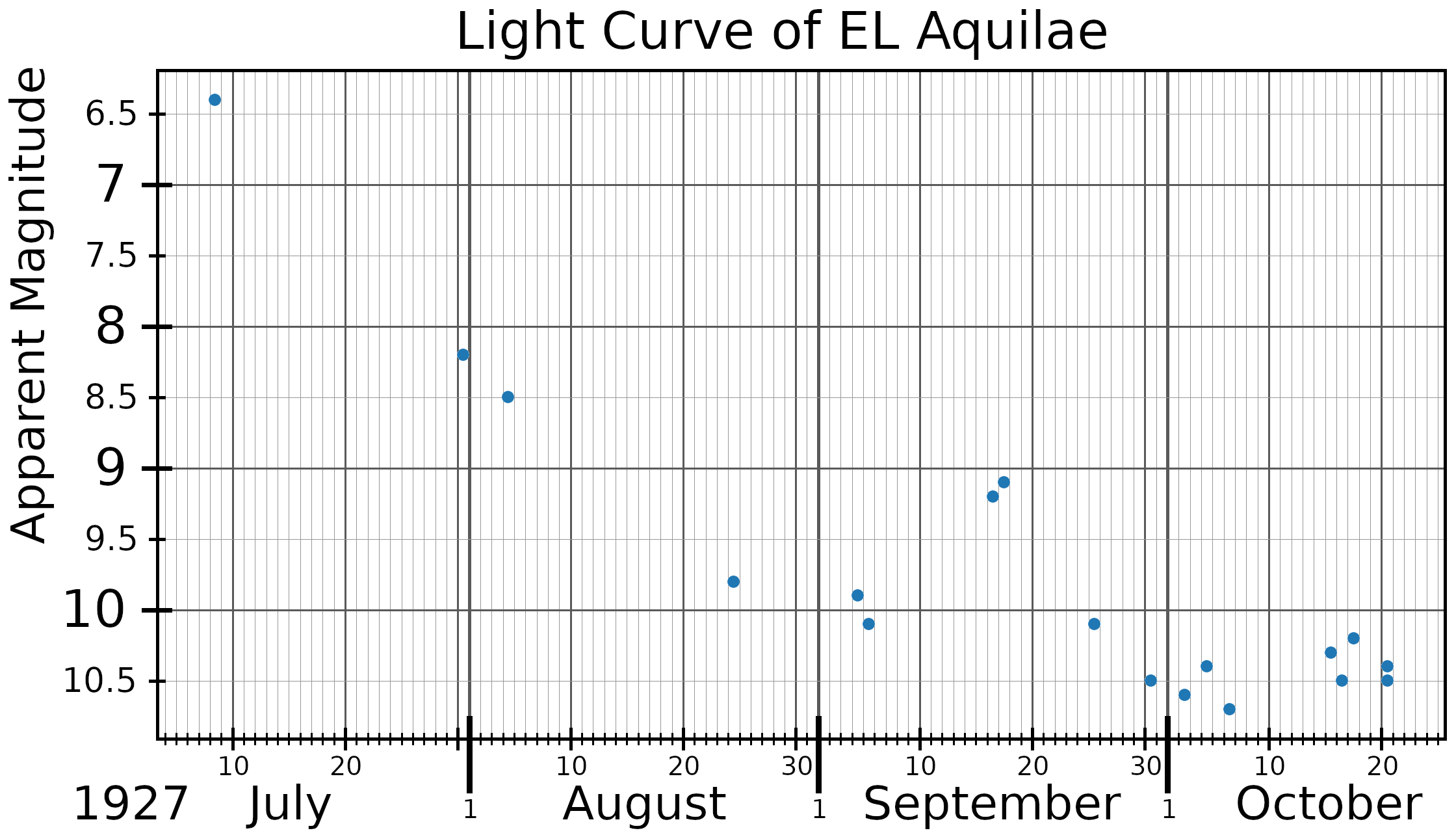
The light curve of EL Aquilae, plotted from data presented by Duerbeck and Cannon

EL Aquilae, also known as Nova Aquilae 1927, was a nova that appeared in 1927. It was discovered by Max Wolf on photographic plates taken at Heidelberg Observatory on 30 and 31 July 1927 when it had a photographic magnitude of 9. Subsequent searches of plates taken at the Harvard College Observatory showed the nova was fainter than magnitude 11.1 on 8 June 1927 and had flared to magnitude 6.4 on 15 June 1927. It declined from peak brightness at an average rate of 0.105 magnitudes per day, making it a fast nova, and ultimately dimmed to about magnitude 21. The 14.5 magnitude change from peak brightness to quiescence was unusually large for a nova.

All novae are binary stars, with a "donor" star orbiting a white dwarf so closely that matter is transferred from the donor to the white dwarf. Pagnotta & Schaefer argued that the donor star for the EL Aquilae system is a red giant, based on its position in an infrared color–color diagram. Tappert et al. suggest that Pagnotta & Schaefer misidentified EL Aquilae, and claim that EL Aquilae is probably an intermediate polar, a nova with a main sequence donor star, based on its eruption amplitude and color.
