= 446 Aeternitas =

Main belt Asteroid

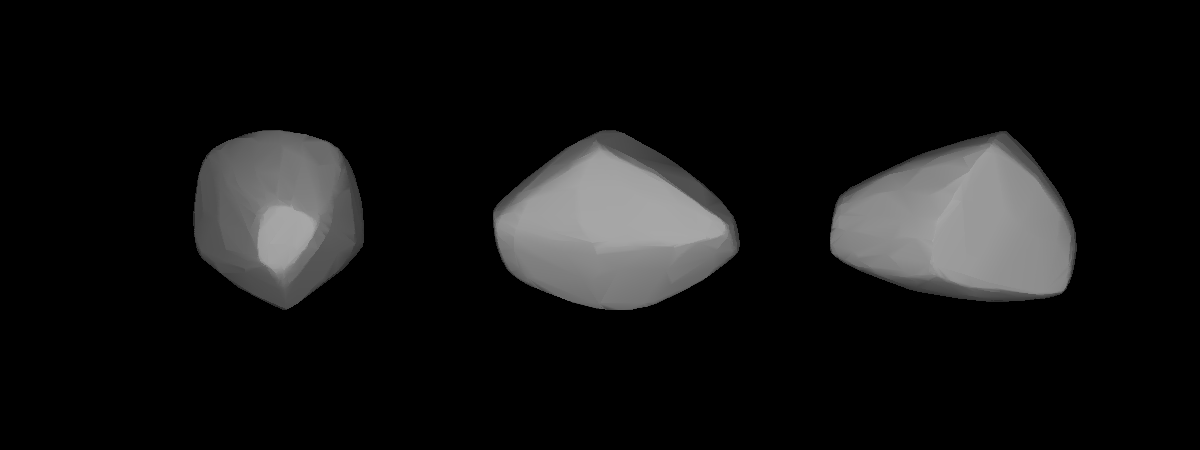
- Lightcurve-base 3D-model of 446 Aeternitas.

Discovery
- Discovered by: M. F. Wolf; A. Schwassmann
- Discovery date: 27 October 1899

Designations
- Pronunciation: /iːˈtɜːrnɪtæs/
- Named after: Aeternitas
- Alternative designations: 1899 ER
- Minor planet category: Main belt

Orbital characteristics
- Epoch 31 July 2016 (JD 2457600.5)
- Uncertainty parameter 0
- Observation arc: 116.23 yr (42452 d)
- Aphelion: 3.14078 AU (469.854 Gm)
- Perihelion: 2.43222 AU (363.855 Gm)
- Semi-major axis: 2.78650 AU (416.854 Gm)
- Eccentricity: 0.12714
- Orbital period (sidereal): 4.65 yr (1699.0 d)
- Mean anomaly: 83.3875°
- Mean motion: 0° 12^{m} 42.811^{s} / day
- Inclination: 10.6270°
- Longitude of ascending node: 42.0823°
- Argument of perihelion: 279.496°

Physical characteristics
- Dimensions: 45.40±3.2 km
- Synodic rotation period: 15.7413 h (0.65589 d)
- Geometric albedo: 0.2361±0.038
- Spectral type: A
- Absolute magnitude (H): 8.90

446 Aeternitas is a main belt asteroid. It was discovered by Max Wolf and A. Schwassmann on 27 October 1899 in Heidelberg. It is classified as an A-type asteroid. The asteroid is roughly 45 km in diameter and has a high albedo.
