= 947 Monterosa =

Minor planet

Discovery
- Discovered by: A. Schwassmann
- Discovery site: Bergedorf
- Discovery date: 8 February 1921

Designations
- Alternative designations: 1921 JD

Orbital characteristics
- Epoch 31 July 2016 (JD 2457600.5)
- Uncertainty parameter 0
- Observation arc: 109.28 yr (39915 days)
- Aphelion: 3.4384 AU (514.38 Gm)
- Perihelion: 2.0641 AU (308.78 Gm)
- Semi-major axis: 2.7513 AU (411.59 Gm)
- Eccentricity: 0.24975
- Orbital period (sidereal): 4.56 yr (1666.8 d)
- Mean anomaly: 61.4561°
- Mean motion: 0° 12^{m} 57.528^{s} / day
- Inclination: 6.7071°
- Longitude of ascending node: 48.349°
- Argument of perihelion: 338.212°

Physical characteristics
- Mean radius: 13.45±0.85 km
- Synodic rotation period: 5.164 h (0.2152 d)
- Geometric albedo: 0.2937±0.040
- Absolute magnitude (H): 9.9

947 Monterosa is a minor planet orbiting the Sun.

Observations performed at the Palmer Divide Observatory in Colorado Springs, Colorado during 2007 produced a light curve with a period of 5.164 ± 0.001 hours with a brightness range of 0.23 ± 0.02 in magnitude. This differs from a period of 2.376 hours reported in 2007.
