= NGC 4411B =

Galaxy in the constellation Virgo

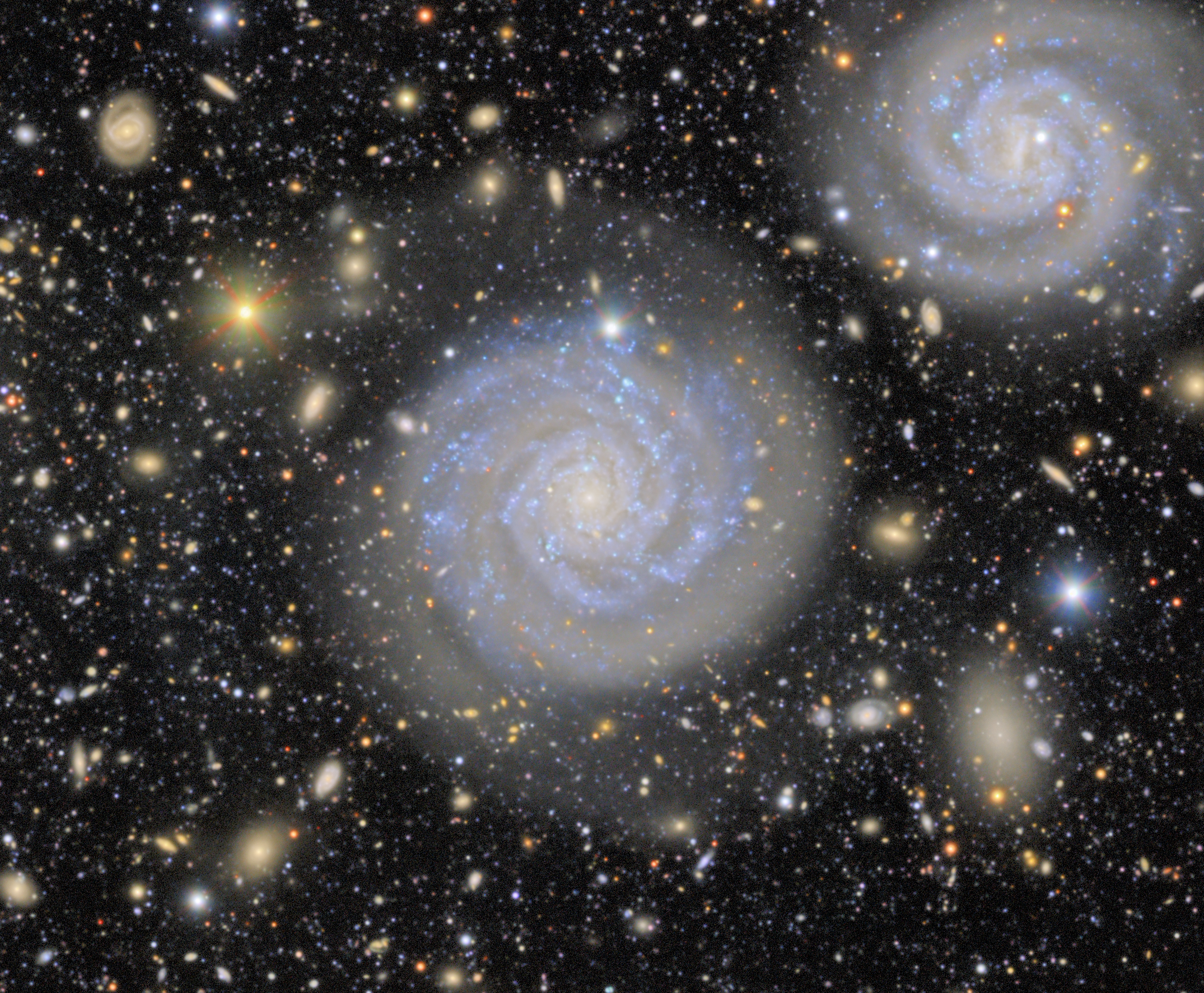
- NGC 4411B imaged by the Vera C. Rubin Observatory

Observation data (J2000 epoch)
- Constellation: Virgo
- Right ascension: 12^{h} 26^{m} 47.2398^{s}
- Declination: +08° 53′ 04.619″
- Redshift: 0.004243±0.000003
- Heliocentric radial velocity: 1,272±1 km/s
- Distance: 73.06 ± 18.26 Mly (22.400 ± 5.600 Mpc)
- Group or cluster: Virgo Cluster
- Apparent magnitude (V): 12.98

Characteristics
- Type: SAB(s)cd
- Size: ~68,000 ly (20.85 kpc) (estimated)
- Apparent size (V): 2.5′ × 2.5′

Other designations
- KPG 336B, IRAS 12242+0909, UGC 7546, MCG +02-32-055, PGC 040745, CGCG 070-082

NGC 4411B (also known as UGC 7546) is a barred spiral galaxy in the constellation of Virgo. Its velocity with respect to the cosmic microwave background is 1,610±24 km/s, which corresponds to a Hubble distance of 77.4 ± 5.5 Mly (23.74 ± 1.70 Mpc). Two non-redshift measurements give a similar distance of 73.06 ± 18.26 Mly (22.400 ± 5.600 Mpc). It was discovered by French astronomer Guillaume Bigourdan on 25 April 1895. There was a longstanding confusion of identification between this galaxy and the neighboring spiral galaxy NGC 4411. Therefore, this galaxy, despite its common name, was not a part of the original New General Catalogue.

NGC 4411B and NGC 4411 form a pair of galaxies, referred to as KPG 336. Both galaxies are members of the Virgo Cluster.

NGC 4411B is a Seyfert II Galaxy, i.e. it has a quasar-like nucleus with very high surface brightnesses whose spectra reveal strong, high-ionisation emission lines, but unlike quasars, the host galaxy is clearly detectable.

== Supernovae ==
Two supernovae have been observed in NGC 4411B.

- SN 1992ad (Type II, mag. 13.5) was discovered by Robert Evans on 1 July 1992.
- SN 2021smj (Type Ia, mag. 17.025) was discovered by ATLAS on 8 July 2021.

== See also ==
- List of NGC objects (4001–5000)
