= 989 Schwassmannia =

Stony background asteroid and a slow rotator

Discovery
- Discovered by: A. Schwassmann
- Discovery site: Bergedorf Obs.
- Discovery date: 18 November 1922

Designations
- Pronunciation: /ʃwæsˈmæniə, ʃvɑːs-/
- Named after: Friedrich Karl Arnold Schwassmann (discoverer himself)
- Alternative designations: A922 WD · 1922 MW; 1935 UE · 1935 UF
- Minor planet category: main-belt · (middle) background

Orbital characteristics
- Epoch 27 April 2019 (JD 2458600.5)
- Uncertainty parameter 0
- Observation arc: 96.49 yr (35,244 d)
- Aphelion: 3.3261 AU
- Perihelion: 1.9915 AU
- Semi-major axis: 2.6588 AU
- Eccentricity: 0.2510
- Orbital period (sidereal): 4.34 yr (1,584 d)
- Mean anomaly: 83.840°
- Mean motion: 0° 13^{m} 38.28^{s} / day
- Inclination: 14.700°
- Longitude of ascending node: 243.40°
- Argument of perihelion: 165.73°

Physical characteristics
- Mean diameter: 12.20±1.12 km; 12.630±0.124 km; 12.86±0.8 km
- Synodic rotation period: 107.85±0.01 h
- Geometric albedo: 0.2035±0.027; 0.226±0.043; 0.306±0.064
- Spectral type: S (S3OS2-TH); T (S3OS2-BB)
- Absolute magnitude (H): 11.8

989 Schwassmannia (prov. designation: A922 WD or 1922 MW) is a stony background asteroid and a slow rotator from the central regions of the asteroid belt, approximately 12.5 kilometers (7.8 miles) in diameter. It was discovered on 18 November 1922, by astronomer Friedrich Karl Arnold Schwassmann at the Bergedorf Observatory in Hamburg, Germany. The bright S/T-type asteroid has a long rotation period of 107.9 hours. It was named after the discoverer himself.

== Orbit and classification ==
Schwassmannia is a non-family asteroid of the main belt's background population when applying the hierarchical clustering method to its proper orbital elements. It orbits the Sun in the central main-belt at a distance of 2.0–3.3 AU once every 4 years and 4 months (1,584 days; semi-major axis of 2.66 AU). Its orbit has an eccentricity of 0.25 and an inclination of 15° with respect to the ecliptic. The body's observation arc begins at the Heidelberg Observatory on 12 November 1922, just 6 days prior to its official discovery observation at the Bergedorf Observatory in Hamburg.

== Naming ==
This minor planet was named after its discoverer, German astronomer Arnold Schwassmann (1870–1964), who discovered four comets and 22 asteroids in total (including this one). Schwassmann worked at the Potsdam (Berlin) and Hamburg–Bergedorf observatories. The official naming citation was mentioned in The Names of the Minor Planets by Paul Herget in 1955 (H 94).

== Physical characteristics ==
In the Tholen- and SMASS-like taxonomy of the Small Solar System Objects Spectroscopic Survey (S3OS2), Schwassmannia is an S-type and T-type asteroid, respectively.

=== Rotation period ===
In November 2013, a rotational lightcurve of Schwassmannia was obtained from photometric observations by astronomers Vladimir Benishek at Sopot Astronomical Observatory (K90), Serbia, American Frederick Pilcher at his Organ Mesa Observatory (G50), New Mexico, and Luis Martinez at Lenomiya Observatory (H13) at Casa Grande in Arizona. Lightcurve analysis gave a well-defined rotation period of 107.85±0.01 hours with a brightness amplitude of 0.35±0.02 magnitude (U=3). Alternative observations with a lower rated quality by Robert Stephens at the Center for Solar System Studies (U81) in September 2013 gave a period of 120.3±1 hours (U=2). (Note: Lightcurve plot of (989) Schwassmannia by Robert Stephens with a rotation period 120.3±1 hours and a brightness amplitude of 0.39±0.05 mag. Quality code for this lightcurve is "2" at the LCDB. Summary figures at the Center for Solar System Studies and LCDB) The results supersede an earlier, tentative observation by Italian Federico Manzini at the Sozzago Astronomical Station (A12) from October 2004, with an incorrect period 4.5 hours (U=1).

=== Diameter and albedo ===
According to the surveys carried out by the Infrared Astronomical Satellite IRAS, the Japanese Akari satellite and the NEOWISE mission of NASA's WISE telescope, Schwassmannia measures between 12.20±1.12 and 12.86±0.8 kilometers in diameter and its surface has a high albedo between 0.20 and 0.31. The Collaborative Asteroid Lightcurve Link adopts the result from IRAS, that is, an albedo of 0.2037 and a diameter of 12.86 kilometers based on an absolute magnitude of 11.8.
