= 442 Eichsfeldia =

Main-belt asteroid

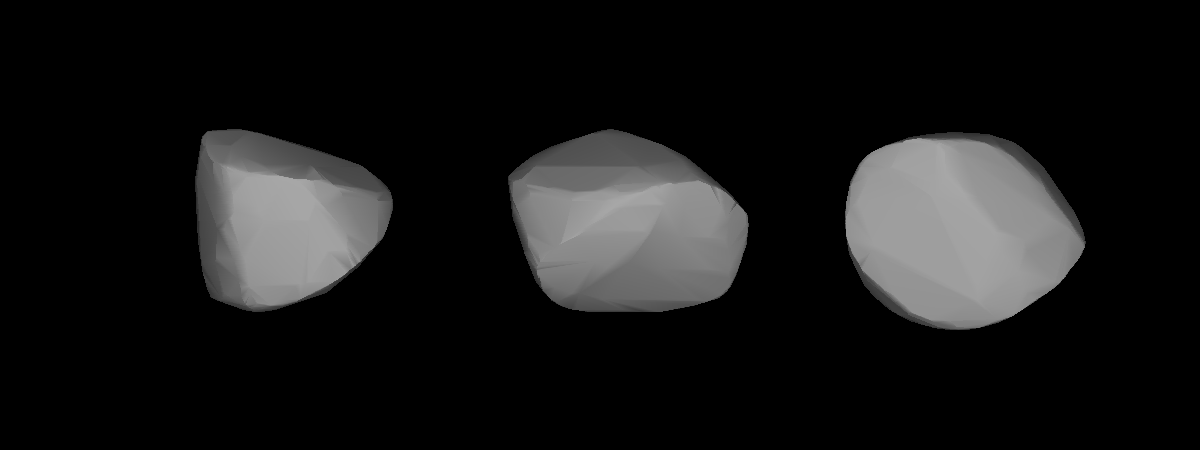
- Lightcurve-base 3D-model of 442 Eichsfeldia.

Discovery
- Discovered by: M. Wolf; A. Schwassmann
- Discovery site: Heidelberg Obs.
- Discovery date: 15 February 1899

Designations
- Pronunciation: /aɪksˈfɛldiə/
- Named after: Eichsfeld
- Alternative designations: 1899 EE; A892 FA
- Minor planet category: main-belt

Orbital characteristics
- Epoch 31 July 2016 (JD 2457600.5)
- Uncertainty parameter 0
- Observation arc: 123.78 yr (45211 d)
- Aphelion: 2.5112 AU (375.67 Gm)
- Perihelion: 2.1796 AU (326.06 Gm)
- Semi-major axis: 2.3454 AU (350.87 Gm)
- Eccentricity: 0.070707
- Orbital period (sidereal): 3.59 yr (1312.0 d)
- Mean anomaly: 185.97°
- Mean motion: 0° 16^{m} 27.84^{s} / day
- Inclination: 6.0689°
- Longitude of ascending node: 134.93°
- Argument of perihelion: 85.047°
- Earth MOID: 1.18144 AU (176.741 Gm)
- Jupiter MOID: 2.47041 AU (369.568 Gm)
- T_{Jupiter}: 3.550

Physical characteristics
- Mean diameter: 65.30±1.65 km (composite estimate); 66.73±1.4 km
- Mass: (2.50±1.23)×10^{17} kg (composite estimate)
- Mean density: 1.71±0.85 g/cm^{3}
- Synodic rotation period: 11.871 h (0.4946 d)
- Geometric albedo: 0.0386±0.002
- Spectral type: BV = 0.692 mag UB = 0.331 mag tholen = C SMASSII = Ch
- Absolute magnitude (H): 10.03 mag 9.94 mag

442 Eichsfeldia is a large main belt asteroid that was discovered by German astronomers Max Wolf and A. Schwassmann on 15 February 1899 in Heidelberg. It is classified as a C-type asteroid and is probably composed of primitive carbonaceous material.

Although Eichsfeldia has an orbit similar to the Vesta family asteroids, it was found to be an unrelated interloper on the basis of its non-matching spectral type.
