= 458 Hercynia =

Main-belt asteroid

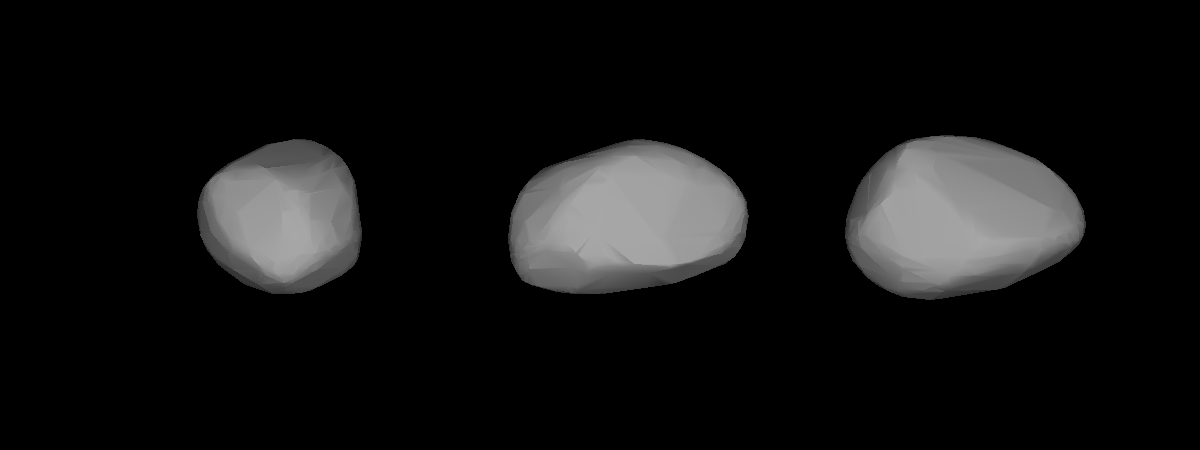
- Lightcurve-base 3D-model of 458 Hercynia.

Discovery
- Discovered by: M. F. Wolf; A. Schwassmann
- Discovery site: Heidelberg Obs.
- Discovery date: 21 September 1900

Designations
- Pronunciation: /hərˈsɪniə/
- Named after: Hercynian Forest (ancient European forest)
- Alternative designations: 1900 FK · 1947 XB; 2016 FW_{5} · A902 CA; A915 PD
- Minor planet category: main-belt · (outer) background

Orbital characteristics
- Epoch 4 September 2017 (JD 2458000.5)
- Uncertainty parameter 0
- Observation arc: 116.79 yr (42,656 days)
- Aphelion: 3.7176 AU
- Perihelion: 2.2784 AU
- Semi-major axis: 2.9980 AU
- Eccentricity: 0.2400
- Orbital period (sidereal): 5.19 yr (1,896 days)
- Mean anomaly: 178.41°
- Mean motion: 0° 11^{m} 23.64^{s} / day
- Inclination: 12.640°
- Longitude of ascending node: 134.26°
- Argument of perihelion: 276.79°

Physical characteristics
- Dimensions: 33.70±7.94 km 36.10±0.85 km 36.698±0.408 km 38.57 km (derived); 38.75±1.0 km 41.410±1.172 km 42.27±0.92 km
- Synodic rotation period: 15.33±0.04 h 16 h 21.806±0.006 h 22.3 h 22.41±0.01 h
- Geometric albedo: 0.1435±0.0205; 0.145±0.007; 0.1654±0.009; 0.19±0.10; 0.191±0.034
- Spectral type: Tholen = S SMASS = L · L · M B–V = 0.885; U–B = 0.471
- Absolute magnitude (H): 9.63 · 9.64 · 9.64±0.24 · 9.72

458 Hercynia, provisional designation 1900 FK, is a background asteroid from the outer regions of the asteroid belt, approximately 38 kilometers in diameter. It was discovered on 21 September 1900, by astronomers Max Wolf and Arnold Schwassmann at the Heidelberg-Königstuhl State Observatory in southwest Germany. The asteroid was named for the ancient Hercynian Forest, known to the Romans as "Hercynia silva".

== Orbit and classification ==
Hercynia is a non-family asteroid of the main belt's background population. It orbits the Sun in the outer asteroid belt at a distance of 2.3–3.7 AU once every 5 years and 2 months (1,896 days; semi-major axis of 3.00 AU). Its orbit has an eccentricity of 0.24 and an inclination of 13° with respect to the ecliptic. The body's observation arc begins two days after to its official discovery observation at Heidelberg.

== Physical characteristics ==
In the Tholen classification, Hercynia is a common S-type, while in the SMASS classification it is a rare L-type asteroid. Polarimetric observations also determined an L-type. Alternatively, the Wide-field Infrared Survey Explorer (WISE) characterized Hercynia as a metallic M-type asteroid.

=== Rotation period ===
Several rotational lightcurves of Hercynia have been obtained from photometric observations since 1985. Lightcurve analysis gave a consolidated, slightly longer-than average rotation period of 21.806 hours with a brightness amplitude between 0.10 and 0.36 magnitude (U=2/2-/3/2/2).

=== Diameter and albedo ===
According to the surveys carried out by the Infrared Astronomical Satellite IRAS, the Japanese Akari satellite and the NEOWISE mission of NASA's WISE telescope, Hercynia measures between 33.70 and 42.27 kilometers in diameter and its surface has an albedo between 0.1435 and 0.191.

The Collaborative Asteroid Lightcurve Link adopts an albedo of 0.1654 from IRAS, and derives a diameter of 38.57 kilometers based on an absolute magnitude of 9.64.

== Naming ==
This minor planet was named after the ancient Central European Hercynian Forest, known as "Hercynia silva" to the Romans. The mountainous and dense forest stretched from the upper part of the Rhine to the Carpathian Mountains in southeastern Europe. According to Caesar, it required a nine-day journey to cross the forest. (The Black Forest located to the south of the discovering observatory is a remnant of the western part of this forest). The official naming citation was mentioned in The Names of the Minor Planets by Paul Herget in 1955 (H 50).
