= Max Wolf =

German astrophotography pioneer (1863–1932)

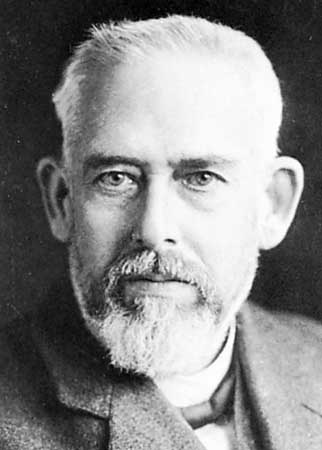
- Max Wolf
- Born: Maximilian Franz Joseph Cornelius Wolf; 21 June 1863; Heidelberg, Grand Duchy of Baden
- Died: 3 October 1932 (aged 69); Heidelberg, Germany
- Education: University of Heidelberg
- Known for: Astrophotography
- Awards: Bruce Medal (1930)
- Scientific career
- Fields: Astronomy
- Workplaces: University of Heidelberg
- Doctoral advisor: Leo Königsberger
- Doctoral students: August Kopff; Heinrich Vogt

Minor planets discovered: 248
see § List of discovered minor planets

Maximilian Franz Joseph Cornelius Wolf (21 June 1863 – 3 October 1932) was a German astronomer and a pioneer in the field of astrophotography. He was the chairman of astronomy at the University of Heidelberg and director of the Heidelberg-Königstuhl State Observatory from 1902 until his death in 1932.

== Early life ==
Max Wolf was born in Heidelberg, Germany on 21 June 1863, the son of medical doctor Franz Wolf. His father encouraged an interest in science and built an observatory for his son in the garden of the family home. It is from here that Wolf was credited with his first astronomical discovery, comet 14P/Wolf, in 1884.

== Life at the university ==
Wolf attended his local university and, in 1888, at the age of 25, was awarded a Ph.D. by the University of Heidelberg. He spent one year of post-graduate study in Stockholm, the only significant time he would spend outside of Heidelberg in his life. He returned to the University of Heidelberg and accepted the position of privat-docent in 1890. A popular lecturer in astronomy, he declined offers of positions from other institutions. In 1902 he was appointed Chair of Astronomy and Director of the new Landessternwarte Heidelberg-Königstuhl observatory, positions he would hold until his death in 1932.

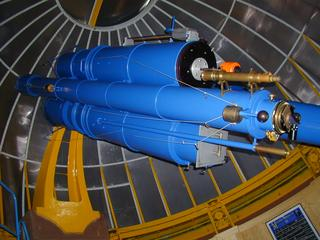
The Bruce double astrograph at Heidelberg Observatory

While the new observatory was being built, Wolf was appointed to supervise the construction and outfitting of the astrophysics half of the observatory. He proved to be not only a capable supervisor but also a successful fundraiser. When sent to America to study the construction of the large new telescopes being built there, he returned not only with telescope plans but also with a grant of $10,000 from the American philanthropist Catherine Wolfe Bruce. Wolf immediately designed and ordered a double refractor telescope from American astronomer and instrument builder John Brashear. This instrument, known as the Bruce double-astrograph, with parallel 16 in (41 cm) lenses and a fast f/5 focal ratio, became the observatory's primary research telescope. Wolf also raised money for a 28 in (71 cm) reflector telescope, the first for the observatory, used for spectroscopy.

In 1910, Wolf proposed to the Carl Zeiss optics firm the creation of a new instrument which would become known as the planetarium. World War I intervened before the invention could be developed, but the Carl Zeiss company resumed this project after peace was restored. The first official public showing was at the Deutsches Museum in Munich, Germany on 21 October 1923.

During his trip to America, Wolf was interested in learning more about the relatively new field of astrophotography. He met the American astronomer and astrophotographer E.E. Barnard, and the two became lifelong correspondents, competitors, collaborators and friends. Wolf wrote a long obituary for Barnard upon his death in 1923.

== Later life and death ==
Heidelberg University became well known for astronomy under Wolf's leadership. Wolf himself was an active researcher, contributing numerous papers in many areas of astronomy up to the end of his life. He died in Heidelberg on 3 October 1932, at the age of 69. He was survived by his wife and three sons.

== Comets and novae ==
Wolf started his career as a comet hunter and continued to discover them throughout his life. He discovered or co-discovered several comets, including 14P/Wolf and 43P/Wolf-Harrington. Wolf won a competition with E. E. Barnard on who would be the first to observe the return of Halley's Comet (P1/Halley) in April 1910.

He discovered Nova Aquilae 1927, a classical nova.

He discovered or co-discovered four supernovae: SN 1895A (a.k.a. VW Vir), SN 1909A (a.k.a. SS UMa), SN 1920A, and, with Reinmuth, SN 1926A.

== Coma Cluster ==
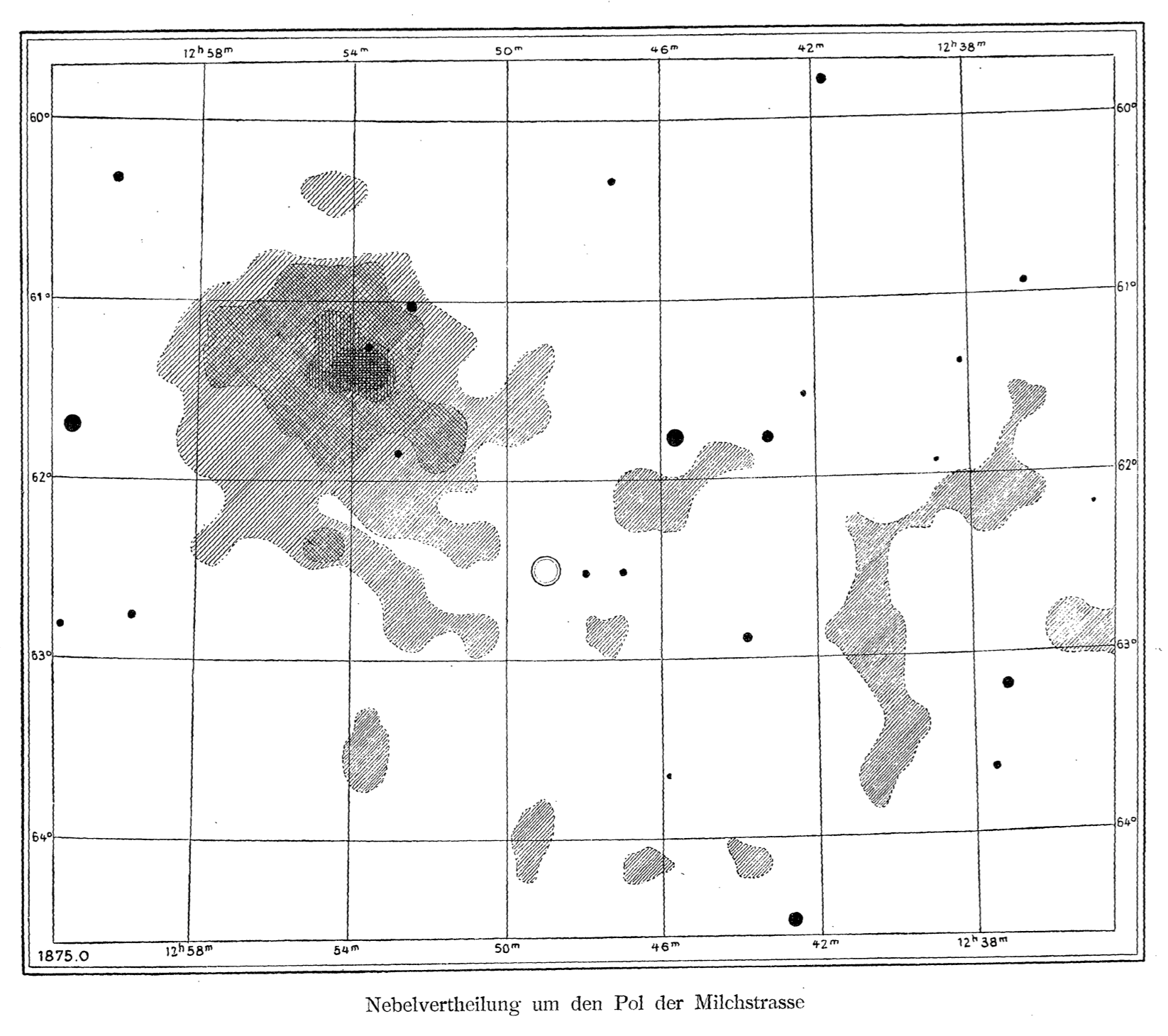
First image of the over-density of fuzzy nebulae (i.e. galaxies) in the Coma Constellation. This is now known as the Coma Cluster of galaxies, one of the largest known clusters in the local Universe.

In 1901 Max Wolf noticed an enhancement of fuzzy extended objects (then called “nebulae”) towards the Northern pole of the Milky-Way galaxy. At the time it was not clear what this represented, but he did remark on it, and concluded with "It would be premature to speculate on this strange result. Nonetheless, I must not miss pointing it out for general attention." Max Wolf had become the first person to photographically survey the Coma Cluster of galaxies, one of the largest known clusters in the local Universe. This fact was not recognised until more than a century later.

== Dark nebulae ==
One of the many significant contributions Wolf made was in the determination of the nature of dark nebulae. These areas of the sky, thought since William Herschel's time to be "holes in the sky", were a puzzle to astronomers of the time. In collaboration with E. E. Barnard, Wolf proved, by careful photographic analysis, that dark nebulae were huge clouds of fine opaque dust.

== Star catalog ==
Along with E. E. Barnard, Wolf applied astrophotography to the observation of stars. The Bruce double-astrograph was originally designed to hunt dim asteroids but it was found to be ideally suited for the study of the proper motion of low-luminosity stars using much the same technique. In 1919 Wolf published a catalog of the locations of over one thousand stars along with their measured proper motion. These stars are still commonly identified by his name and catalog number. Among the stars he discovered is Wolf 359, a dim red dwarf that was later found to be one of the nearest stars to the Solar System. He continued to add proper motion star discoveries to this catalog throughout his life, with the catalog eventually totaling over 1500 stars, many more than all of his competitors combined. These stars are significant because stars with low luminosity and high proper motion, such as Barnard's Star and Wolf 359, are usually relatively close to the Earth and thus the stars in Wolf's catalog remain popular subjects for astronomical research. The methods used by E. E. Barnard and Wolf were continued by Frank Elmore Ross and George Van Biesbroeck through the mid-20th century. Since that time, photographic plates have been gradually replaced with more sensitive electronic photodetectors for astronomical surveys.

== Asteroids ==
In 1891, Wolf discovered his first asteroid, 323 Brucia, and named it after Catherine Wolfe Bruce. He pioneered the use of astrophotographic techniques to automate the discovery of asteroids, as opposed to older visual methods, as a result of which asteroid discovery rates sharply increased. In time-exposure photographs, asteroids appear as short streaks due to their planetary motion with respect to fixed stars. Wolf discovered 248 asteroids in his lifetime.

Among his many discoveries was 588 Achilles (the first Trojan asteroid) in 1906, as well as two other Trojans: 659 Nestor and 884 Priamus. He also discovered 887 Alinda in 1918, which is now recognized as an Earth-crossing Amor asteroid (or sometimes classified as the namesake of its own Alinda family). Wolf's then-record number of discoveries was surpassed by his pupil Karl Wilhelm Reinmuth on 24 July 1933.

=== List of discovered minor planets ===
Superscript letters indicate co-discovery made with:

- ^{A} A. Schwassmann
- ^{B} L. Carnera
- ^{C} P. Götz
- ^{D} A. Kopff
- ^{E} M. Ferrero

- 323 Brucia - 22 December 1891
- 325 Heidelberga - 4 March 1892
- 328 Gudrun - 18 March 1892
- 329 Svea - 21 March 1892
- 330 Adalberta - 2 February 1910
- 332 Siri - 19 March 1892
- 333 Badenia - 22 August 1892
- 334 Chicago - 23 August 1892
- 339 Dorothea - 25 September 1892
- 340 Eduarda - 25 September 1892
- 341 California - 25 September 1892
- 342 Endymion - 17 October 1892
- 343 Ostara - 15 November 1892
- 351 Yrsa - 16 December 1892
- 352 Gisela - 12 January 1893
- 353 Ruperto-Carola - 16 January 1893
- 385 Ilmatar - 1 March 1894
- 386 Siegena - 1 March 1894
- 391 Ingeborg - 1 November 1894
- 392 Wilhelmina - 4 November 1894
- 393 Lampetia - 4 November 1894
- 399 Persephone - 23 February 1895
- 401 Ottilia - 16 March 1895
- 407 Arachne - 13 October 1895
- 408 Fama - 13 October 1895
- 412 Elisabetha - 7 January 1896
- 413 Edburga - 7 January 1896
- 415 Palatia - 7 February 1896
- 417 Suevia - 6 May 1896
- 418 Alemannia - 7 September 1896
- 419 Aurelia - 7 September 1896
- 420 Bertholda - 7 September 1896
- 421 Zahringia - 7 September 1896
- 434 Hungaria - 11 September 1898
- 435 Ella - 11 September 1898^{[A]}
- 436 Patricia - 13 September 1898^{[A]}
- 442 Eichsfeldia - 15 February 1899^{[A]}
- 443 Photographica - 17 February 1899^{[A]}
- 446 Aeternitas - 27 October 1899^{[A]}
- 447 Valentine - 27 October 1899^{[A]}
- 448 Natalie - 27 October 1899^{[A]}
- 449 Hamburga - 31 October 1899^{[A]}
- 450 Brigitta - 10 October 1899^{[A]}
- 455 Bruchsalia - 22 May 1900^{[A]}
- 456 Abnoba - 4 June 1900^{[A]}
- 457 Alleghenia - 15 September 1900^{[A]}
- 458 Hercynia - 21 September 1900^{[A]}
- 459 Signe - 22 October 1900
- 460 Scania - 22 October 1900
- 461 Saskia - 22 October 1900
- 462 Eriphyla - 22 October 1900
- 463 Lola - 31 October 1900
- 464 Megaira - 9 January 1901
- 465 Alekto - 13 January 1901
- 466 Tisiphone - 17 January 1901^{[B]}
- 467 Laura - 9 January 1901
- 468 Lina - 18 January 1901
- 471 Papagena - 7 June 1901
- 473 Nolli - 13 February 1901
- 474 Prudentia - 13 February 1901
- 480 Hansa - 21 May 1901^{[B]}
- 482 Petrina - 3 March 1902
- 483 Seppina - 4 March 1902
- 484 Pittsburghia - 29 April 1902
- 488 Kreusa - 26 June 1902^{[B]}
- 490 Veritas - 3 September 1902
- 491 Carina - 3 September 1902
- 492 Gismonda - 3 September 1902
- 493 Griseldis - 7 September 1902
- 494 Virtus - 7 October 1902
- 495 Eulalia - 25 October 1902
- 496 Gryphia - 25 October 1902
- 499 Venusia - 24 December 1902
- 500 Selinur - 16 January 1903
- 501 Urhixidur - 18 January 1903
- 502 Sigune - 19 January 1903
- 509 Iolanda - 28 April 1903
- 512 Taurinensis - 23 June 1903
- 513 Centesima - 24 August 1903
- 514 Armida - 24 August 1903
- 515 Athalia - 20 September 1903
- 520 Franziska - 27 October 1903^{[C]}
- 522 Helga - 10 January 1904
- 524 Fidelio - 14 March 1904
- 526 Jena - 14 March 1904
- 527 Euryanthe - 20 March 1904
- 528 Rezia - 20 March 1904
- 529 Preziosa - 20 March 1904
- 530 Turandot - 11 April 1904
- 531 Zerlina - 12 April 1904
- 532 Herculina - 20 April 1904
- 539 Pamina - 2 August 1904
- 540 Rosamunde - 3 August 1904
- 541 Deborah - 4 August 1904
- 549 Jessonda - 15 November 1904
- 550 Senta - 16 November 1904
- 551 Ortrud - 16 November 1904
- 552 Sigelinde - 14 December 1904
- 553 Kundry - 27 December 1904
- 555 Norma - 14 January 1905
- 557 Violetta - 26 January 1905
- 558 Carmen - 9 February 1905
- 559 Nanon - 8 March 1905
- 560 Delila - 13 March 1905
- 561 Ingwelde - 26 March 1905
- 562 Salome - 3 April 1905
- 565 Marbachia - 9 May 1905
- 570 Kythera - 30 July 1905
- 573 Recha - 19 September 1905
- 574 Reginhild - 19 September 1905
- 575 Renate - 19 September 1905
- 577 Rhea - 20 October 1905
- 578 Happelia - 1 November 1905
- 580 Selene - 17 December 1905
- 586 Thekla - 21 February 1906
- 587 Hypsipyle - 22 February 1906
- 588 Achilles - 22 February 1906
- 590 Tomyris - 4 March 1906
- 592 Bathseba - 18 March 1906
- 594 Mireille - 27 March 1906
- 597 Bandusia - 16 April 1906
- 598 Octavia - 13 April 1906
- 601 Nerthus - 21 June 1906
- 605 Juvisia - 27 August 1906
- 609 Fulvia - 24 September 1906
- 610 Valeska - 26 September 1906
- 641 Agnes - 8 September 1907
- 642 Clara - 8 September 1907
- 659 Nestor - 23 March 1908
- 683 Lanzia - 23 July 1909
- 692 Hippodamia - 5 November 1901^{[D]}
- 707 Steina - 22 December 1910
- 712 Boliviana - 19 March 1911
- 733 Mocia - 16 September 1912
- 798 Ruth - 21 November 1914
- 800 Kressmannia - 20 March 1915
- 801 Helwerthia - 20 March 1915
- 802 Epyaxa - 20 March 1915
- 805 Hormuthia - 17 April 1915
- 806 Gyldenia - 18 April 1915
- 807 Ceraskia - 18 April 1915
- 809 Lundia - 11 August 1915
- 810 Atossa - 8 September 1915
- 811 Nauheima - 8 September 1915
- 813 Baumeia - 28 November 1915
- 815 Coppelia - 2 February 1916
- 816 Juliana - 8 February 1916
- 817 Annika - 6 February 1916
- 818 Kapteynia - 21 February 1916
- 819 Barnardiana - 3 March 1916
- 820 Adriana - 30 March 1916
- 821 Fanny - 31 March 1916
- 822 Lalage - 31 March 1916
- 823 Sisigambis - 31 March 1916
- 826 Henrika - 28 April 1916
- 831 Stateira - 20 September 1916
- 832 Karin - 20 September 1916
- 833 Monica - 20 September 1916
- 834 Burnhamia - 20 September 1916
- 835 Olivia - 23 September 1916
- 836 Jole - 23 September 1916
- 837 Schwarzschilda - 23 September 1916
- 838 Seraphina - 24 September 1916
- 839 Valborg - 24 September 1916
- 840 Zenobia - 25 September 1916
- 841 Arabella - 1 October 1916
- 842 Kerstin - 1 October 1916
- 845 Naema - 16 November 1916
- 860 Ursina - 22 January 1917
- 861 Aida - 22 January 1917
- 862 Franzia - 28 January 1917
- 863 Benkoela - 9 February 1917
- 865 Zubaida - 15 February 1917
- 866 Fatme - 25 February 1917
- 868 Lova - 26 April 1917
- 870 Manto - 12 May 1917
- 871 Amneris - 14 May 1917
- 872 Holda - 21 May 1917
- 873 Mechthild - 21 May 1917
- 874 Rotraut - 25 May 1917
- 875 Nymphe - 19 May 1917
- 879 Ricarda - 22 July 1917
- 880 Herba - 22 July 1917
- 881 Athene - 22 July 1917
- 883 Matterania - 14 September 1917
- 884 Priamus - 22 September 1917
- 887 Alinda - 3 January 1918
- 888 Parysatis - 2 February 1918
- 889 Erynia - 5 March 1918
- 890 Waltraut - 11 March 1918
- 891 Gunhild - 17 May 1918
- 892 Seeligeria - 31 May 1918
- 893 Leopoldina - 31 May 1918
- 894 Erda - 4 June 1918
- 895 Helio - 11 July 1918
- 896 Sphinx - 1 August 1918
- 897 Lysistrata - 3 August 1918
- 898 Hildegard - 3 August 1918
- 899 Jokaste - 3 August 1918
- 900 Rosalinde - 10 August 1918
- 901 Brunsia - 30 August 1918
- 904 Rockefellia - 29 October 1918
- 907 Rhoda - 12 November 1918
- 908 Buda - 30 November 1918
- 914 Palisana - 4 July 1919
- 919 Ilsebill - 30 October 1918
- 927 Ratisbona - 16 February 1920
- 946 Poësia - 11 February 1921
- 949 Hel - 11 March 1921
- 972 Cohnia - 18 January 1922
- 1008 La Paz - 31 October 1923
- 1021 Flammario - 11 March 1924
- 1038 Tuckia - 24 November 1924
- 1039 Sonneberga - 24 November 1924
- 1053 Vigdis - 16 November 1925
- 1069 Planckia - 28 January 1927
- 1134 Kepler - 25 September 1929
- 1141 Bohmia - 4 January 1930
- 1169 Alwine - 30 August 1930^{[E]}
- 1178 Irmela - 13 March 1931
- 1179 Mally - 19 March 1931
- 1203 Nanna - 5 October 1931
- 1214 Richilde - 1 January 1932
- 1219 Britta - 6 February 1932
- 1365 Henyey - 9 September 1928
- 1514 Ricouxa - 22 August 1906
- 1661 Granule - 31 March 1916
- 1703 Barry - 2 September 1930
- 1967 Menzel - 1 November 1905
- 2017 Wesson - 20 September 1903
- 2119 Schwall - 30 August 1930^{[E]}
- 2298 Cindijon - 2 October 1915
- 2373 Immo - 4 August 1929
- 2443 Tomeileen - 24 January 1906
- 2483 Guinevere - 17 August 1928
- 2533 Fechtig - 3 November 1905
- 2650 Elinor - 14 March 1931
- 2732 Witt - 19 March 1926
- 3034 Climenhaga - 24 September 1917
- 3202 Graff - 3 January 1908
- 3396 Muazzez - 15 October 1915
- 3626 Ohsaki - 4 August 1929
- 3907 Kilmartin - 14 August 1904
- 4588 Wislicenus - 13 March 1931
- 4775 Hansen - 3 October 1927
- 4809 Robertball - 5 September 1928
- 5702 Morando - 16 March 1931
- 5926 Schönfeld - 4 August 1929

== Awards and honors ==
- Prix Jules Janssen, the highest award of the Société astronomique de France, the French astronomical society, in 1912.
- Gold Medal of the Royal Astronomical Society in 1914.
- Bruce Medal in 1930.

The lunar crater Wolf as well as the main-belt asteroids 827 Wolfiana and 1217 Maximiliana were named in his honor.

Minor planet 1152 Pawona is named after both Johann Palisa and Max Wolf, in recognition of their cooperation. The name was proposed by Swedish astronomer Bror Ansgar Asplind. Pawona is a combination of "Palisa" and "Wolf" (Pa, Wo) joined with a Latin feminine suffix.

== Other astronomers named Wolf ==
- Marek Wolf, a Czech astronomer who is also a discoverer of minor planets. He is credited as "M. Wolf" by the Minor Planet Center, while the discoveries by Max Wolf are credited with "M. F. Wolf".
- Charles Wolf, a French astronomer and co-discoverer of the Wolf-Rayet stars.
- German astronomers Christian Wolf and Ulrich Wolff (amateur from Berlin), as well as American astronomer Chris Wolfe have also discovered minor planets.
