= 412 Elisabetha =

Main-belt asteroid

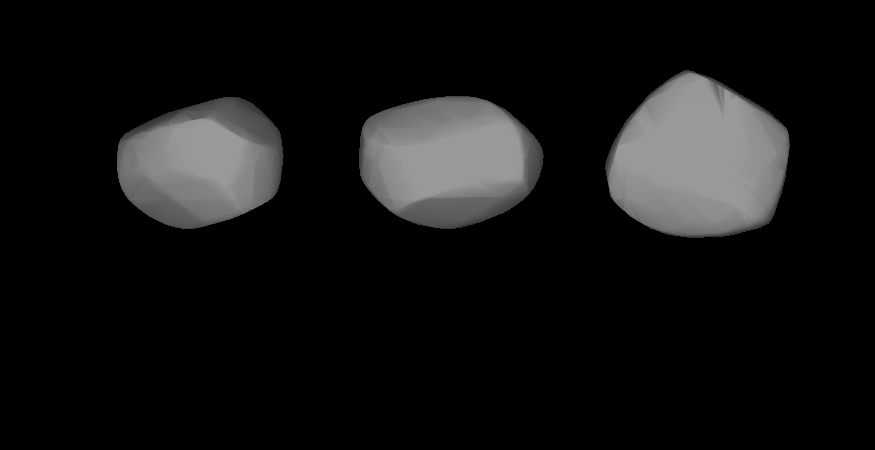
- Lightcurve-base 3D-model of 412 Elisabetha.

Discovery
- Discovered by: Max Wolf
- Discovery date: 7 January 1896

Designations
- Alternative designations: 1896 CK
- Minor planet category: Main belt

Orbital characteristics
- Epoch 31 July 2016 (JD 2457600.5)
- Uncertainty parameter 0
- Observation arc: 117.65 yr (42970 d)
- Aphelion: 2.8841 AU (431.46 Gm)
- Perihelion: 2.64290 AU (395.372 Gm)
- Semi-major axis: 2.7635 AU (413.41 Gm)
- Eccentricity: 0.043648
- Orbital period (sidereal): 4.59 yr (1,678.0 d)
- Mean anomaly: 1.07289°
- Mean motion: 0° 12^{m} 52.344^{s} / day
- Inclination: 13.767°
- Longitude of ascending node: 106.47°
- Argument of perihelion: 91.701°

Physical characteristics
- Mean diameter: 97+7 −14 km 119 ± 9 km (alternate pole solution)
- Mass: (1.843 ± 0.850/0.441)×10^{18} kg
- Mean density: 2.09–3.86 g/cm^{3} (calculated)
- Synodic rotation period: 19.65618 ± 0.00004 h 10.65610 ± 0.00003 h (alternate pole solution)
- Pole ecliptic longitude: 191° ± 23° 3° ± 20° (alternate pole solution)
- Pole ecliptic latitude: 52° ± 8° 17° ± 7° (alternate pole solution)
- Geometric albedo: 0.044±0.005
- Absolute magnitude (H): 9.17; 8.97

412 Elisabetha is a large main belt asteroid that was discovered by German astronomer Max Wolf on 7 January 1896 in Heidelberg. It may have been named after his mother, Elise Wolf (née Helwerth). This minor planet is orbiting at a distance of 2.76 AU from the Sun with a period of 4.59 years and an orbital eccentricity (ovalness) of 0.044. The orbital plane is inclined at an angle of 13.8° to the plane of the ecliptic.

This asteroid is rotating with a period of 19.65618±0.00004 h. Shape models and stellar occultations provide an estimated diameter of 97+7
−14 km. Older diameter estimates range from 76.38±2.114 to 111.12±22.22 km.
