= 482 Petrina =

Asteroid

Discovery
- Discovered by: Max Wolf
- Discovery site: Heidelberg
- Discovery date: 3 March 1902

Designations
- Pronunciation: /pɛˈtraɪnə/
- Alternative designations: 1902 HT

Orbital characteristics
- Epoch 31 July 2016 (JD 2457600.5)
- Uncertainty parameter 0
- Observation arc: 111.53 yr (40737 d)
- Aphelion: 3.2971 AU (493.24 Gm)
- Perihelion: 2.7064 AU (404.87 Gm)
- Semi-major axis: 3.0017 AU (449.05 Gm)
- Eccentricity: 0.098396
- Orbital period (sidereal): 5.20 yr (1899.6 d)
- Mean anomaly: 287.189°
- Mean motion: 0° 11^{m} 22.272^{s} / day
- Inclination: 14.474°
- Longitude of ascending node: 179.408°
- Argument of perihelion: 86.737°

Physical characteristics
- Mean radius: 23.285±1.4 km
- Synodic rotation period: 11.7922 h (0.49134 d)
- Geometric albedo: 0.2372±0.032
- Absolute magnitude (H): 8.84

482 Petrina is a minor planet orbiting the Sun.

Attempts to produce a light curve for this object have yielded differing synodic rotation periods, perhaps in part because the period is close to half an Earth day. Observations suggest that the pole of rotation is near the orbital plane, yielding only small light variations during certain parts of each orbit. Attempts to observe the asteroid photometrically during an optimal viewing period of the object's orbit gave a rotation period of 11.7922 ± 0.0001 h with an amplitude variation of 0.53 ± 0.05 in magnitude.
