= 880 Herba =

Main-belt asteroid

Discovery
- Discovered by: Max Wolf
- Discovery site: Heidelberg Observatory
- Discovery date: 22 July 1917

Designations
- Pronunciation: /ˈhɜːrbə/
- Alternative designations: 1917 CK

Orbital characteristics
- Epoch 31 July 2016 (JD 2457600.5)
- Uncertainty parameter 0
- Observation arc: 98.72 yr (36057 days)
- Aphelion: 3.9674 AU (593.51 Gm)
- Perihelion: 2.0291 AU (303.55 Gm)
- Semi-major axis: 2.9983 AU (448.54 Gm)
- Eccentricity: 0.32323
- Orbital period (sidereal): 5.19 yr (1896.3 d)
- Mean anomaly: 340.970°
- Mean motion: 0° 11^{m} 23.424^{s} / day
- Inclination: 15.145°
- Longitude of ascending node: 262.618°
- Argument of perihelion: 101.118°

Physical characteristics
- Synodic rotation period: 12.266 h (0.5111 d)
- Spectral type: F-type
- Absolute magnitude (H): 11.46

880 Herba is a minor planet orbiting the Sun that was discovered by German astronomer Max Wolf on 22 July 1917 in Heidelberg.

Photometric observations of this asteroid at the Organ Mesa Observatory in Las Cruces, New Mexico, in 2011 gave a light curve with a period of 12.266 ± 0.001 hours and a brightness variation of 0.13 ± 0.02 in magnitude. The curve is asymmetrical with one maxima and one minima.

880 Herba is named after Herba, the Greek god of misery and poverty.
