= 483 Seppina =

Main-belt Asteroid

Discovery
- Discovered by: Max Wolf
- Discovery site: Heidelberg
- Discovery date: 4 March 1902

Designations
- Pronunciation: /sɛˈpaɪnə/
- Alternative designations: 1902 HU

Orbital characteristics
- Epoch 31 July 2016 (JD 2457600.5)
- Uncertainty parameter 0
- Observation arc: 114.11 yr (41680 d)
- Aphelion: 3.6073 AU (539.64 Gm)
- Perihelion: 3.2579 AU (487.37 Gm)
- Semi-major axis: 3.4326 AU (513.51 Gm)
- Eccentricity: 0.050888
- Orbital period (sidereal): 6.36 yr (2322.9 d)
- Mean anomaly: 212.541°
- Mean motion: 0° 9^{m} 17.928^{s} / day
- Inclination: 18.772°
- Longitude of ascending node: 173.998°
- Argument of perihelion: 157.582°

Physical characteristics
- Mean diameter: 73+5 −2 km (pole solution 1); 74+4 −2 km (pole solution 2)
- Synodic rotation period: 12.720968±0.000004 h (pole solution 1); 12.720977±0.000002 h (pole solution 2)
- Pole ecliptic longitude: 127° ± 3° or 356° ± 4°
- Pole ecliptic latitude: 47° ± 3° or 60° ± 3°
- Geometric albedo: 0.16+0.04 −0.01
- Absolute magnitude (H): 8.33

483 Seppina is a minor planet orbiting the Sun, located in the dynamical Cybele group of asteroids. It is approximately 69 kilometers in diameter.
