= 874 Rotraut =

Dark and elongated background asteroid

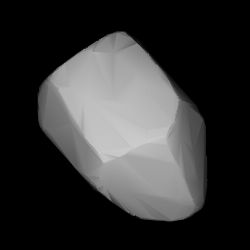
- Modelled shape of Rotraut from its lightcurve

Discovery
- Discovered by: M. F. Wolf
- Discovery site: Heidelberg Obs.
- Discovery date: 25 May 1917

Designations
- Named after: Schön Rotraut (poem by Eduard Mörike)
- Alternative designations: A917 KK · 1976 WJ; 1917 CC
- Minor planet category: main-belt · (outer); background

Orbital characteristics
- Epoch 31 May 2020 (JD 2459000.5)
- Uncertainty parameter 0
- Observation arc: 102.67 yr (37,499 d)
- Aphelion: 3.4039 AU
- Perihelion: 2.8992 AU
- Semi-major axis: 3.1515 AU
- Eccentricity: 0.0801
- Orbital period (sidereal): 5.59 yr (2,044 d)
- Mean anomaly: 171.80°
- Mean motion: 0° 10^{m} 34.32^{s} / day
- Inclination: 11.141°
- Longitude of ascending node: 190.63°
- Argument of perihelion: 9.4547°

Physical characteristics
- Dimensions: 51.1 km × 37.7 km
- Mean diameter: 56.47±5.5 km; 58.287±0.198 km; 59.38±0.73 km
- Synodic rotation period: 14.297 h
- Pole ecliptic latitude: (201.0°, −41.0°) (λ_{1}/β_{1}); (2.0°, −36.0°) (λ_{2}/β_{2})
- Geometric albedo: 0.051±0.002; 0.054±0.004; 0.0554±0.013
- Spectral type: Caa (S3OS2-TH); Ch (S3OS2-BB)
- Absolute magnitude (H): 10.1

874 Rotraut (prov. designation: A917 KK or 1917 CC) is a dark and elongated background asteroid, approximately 58 kilometers (36 miles) in diameter, located in the outer region of the asteroid belt. It was discovered on 25 May 1917, by astronomer Max Wolf at the Heidelberg-Königstuhl State Observatory is southwest Germany. The hydrated carbonaceous C-type asteroid (Ch) has a rotation period of 14.3 hours. It was likely named after the ballad Schön Rotraut by German lyric poet Eduard Mörike (1804–1875).

== Orbit and classification ==
Rotraut is a non-family asteroid of the main belt's background population when applying the hierarchical clustering method to its proper orbital elements. It orbits the Sun in the outer asteroid belt at a distance of 2.9–3.4 AU once every 5 years and 7 months (2,044 days; semi-major axis of 3.15 AU). Its orbit has an eccentricity of 0.08 and an inclination of 11° with respect to the ecliptic. The body's observation arc begins at Heidelberg Observatory with its official discovery observation on 25 May 1917.

== Naming ==
"Rotraut" is a feminine German first name. This minor planet was likely named after the ballad Schön Rotraut (Pretty Rohtraut) by the German lyric poet Eduard Mörike (1804–1875). Lutz Schmadel, the author of the Dictionary of Minor Planet Names learned about Wolf's source of inspiration from private communications with Dutch astronomer Ingrid van Houten-Groeneveld, who worked as a young astronomer at Heidelberg.

== Physical characteristics ==
In the Tholen-like taxonomy of the Small Solar System Objects Spectroscopic Survey (S3OS2), Rotraut is a carbonaceous C-type asteroid (Caa), while in the survey's SMASS-like taxonomic variation it is a hydrated C-type (Ch).

=== Rotation period ===
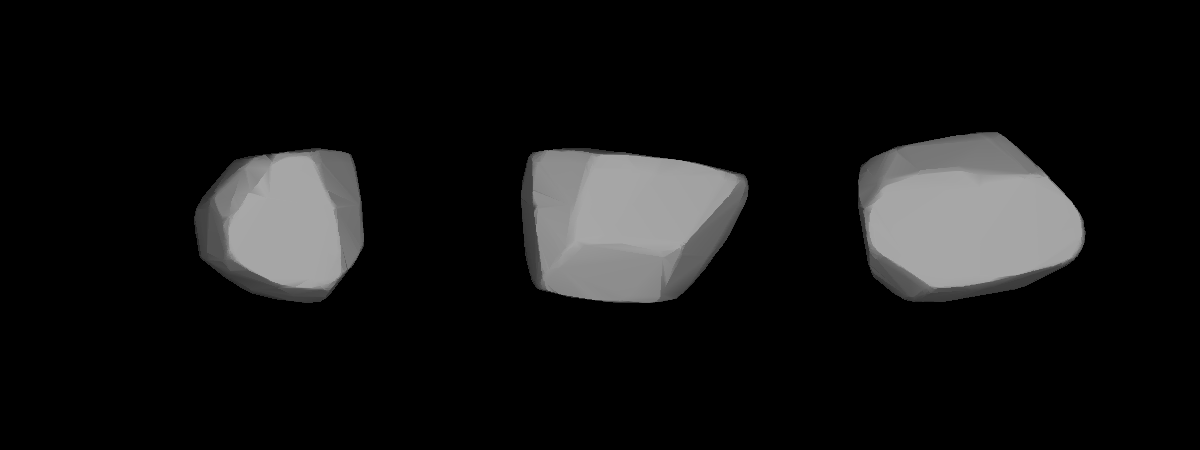
Lightcurve-based 3D-model of Rotraut

Two rotational lightcurves of Rotraut were obtained from photometric observations by Richard Ditteon at Oakley Southern Sky Observatory (E09), Australia, in February 2017, and by Tom Polakis at the Command Module Observatory (V02) in Arizona in May 2018. Lightcurve analysis gave an identical rotation period of 14.297 hours with a brightness variation of 0.25±0.05 and 0.29±0.03 magnitude, respectively (U=3−/3−). The result supersedes a tentative period determination of 14.586±0.003 hours and an amplitude of 0.24±0.01 magnitude by French amateur astronomers Stéphane Charbonnel and Claudine Rinner from July 2002 (U=2).

In 2016, a modeled lightcurve gave a sidereal period of 14.3007±0.0002 hours using data from the Uppsala Asteroid Photometric Catalogue, the Palomar Transient Factory survey, and individual observers (such as above), as well as sparse-in-time photometry from the NOFS, the Catalina Sky Survey, and the La Palma surveys (950). The study also determined two spin axes of (201.0°, −41.0°) and (2.0°, −36.0°) in ecliptic coordinates (λ, β).

=== Diameter and albedo ===
According to the surveys carried out by the Infrared Astronomical Satellite IRAS, the NEOWISE mission of NASA's Wide-field Infrared Survey Explorer (WISE), and the Japanese Akari satellite, Rotraut measures (56.47±5.5), (58.287±0.198) and (59.38±0.73) kilometers in diameter and its surface has an albedo of (0.0554±0.013), (0.054±0.004) and (0.051±0.002), respectively. The Collaborative Asteroid Lightcurve Link derives an albedo of 0.0506 and a diameter of 56.42 kilometers based on an absolute magnitude of 10.1. Alternative mean-diameter measurements published by the WISE team include (55.05±26.18 km), (58.70±0.56 km), (61.30±17.55 km) and (65.759±0.648 km) with corresponding albedos of (0.04±0.06), (0.047±0.006), (0.04±0.03) and (0.0409±0.0089).

Three asteroid occultations, observed on 30 November 2009, 22 September 2013 and 21 November 2015, gave a best-fit ellipse dimension of (53.0 km × 53.0 km), (51.1 km × 37.7 km) (best), and (59.0 km × 59.0 km), respectively. These timed observations are taken when the asteroid passes in front of a distant star. However the quality of the measurement is rated poorly.
