= 529 Preziosa =

Main-belt asteroid

Discovery
- Discovered by: Max Wolf
- Discovery site: Heidelberg
- Discovery date: 20 March 1904

Designations
- Pronunciation: Spanish: [pɾeˈθjosa] Italian: [pretˈtsjoːza]
- Alternative designations: 1904 NT

Orbital characteristics
- Epoch 31 July 2016 (JD 2457600.5)
- Uncertainty parameter 0
- Observation arc: 113.30 yr (41382 d)
- Aphelion: 3.3078 AU (494.84 Gm)
- Perihelion: 2.7246 AU (407.59 Gm)
- Semi-major axis: 3.0162 AU (451.22 Gm)
- Eccentricity: 0.096685
- Orbital period (sidereal): 5.24 yr (1913.3 d)
- Mean anomaly: 298.796°
- Mean motion: 0° 11^{m} 17.376^{s} / day
- Inclination: 11.024°
- Longitude of ascending node: 65.210°
- Argument of perihelion: 333.658°

Physical characteristics
- Mean radius: 16.005±0.75 km
- Synodic rotation period: 27 h (1.1 d)
- Geometric albedo: 0.1632±0.017
- Absolute magnitude (H): 10.06

529 Preziosa is a minor planet orbiting the Sun that was discovered by German astronomer Max Wolf on 20 March 1904 from Heidelberg.

This is a member of the dynamic Eos family of asteroids that were probably formed as the result of a collisional breakup of a parent body.

The name is that of the protagonist of one of Miguel de Cervantes's Exemplary Novels. It is possible, since this was a period when Wolf habitually named his comets after operatic heroines, that he specifically had in mind the Preziosa in the eponymous opera by Antonio Smareglia.
