= 919 Ilsebill =

Asteroid

Discovery
- Discovered by: M. F. Wolf
- Discovery site: Heidelberg Obs.
- Discovery date: 30 October 1918

Designations
- Named after: Fairy tale character "Ilsebill" (The Fisherman and his Wife)
- Alternative designations: A918 UD · 1935 JG; 1950 RP · 1950 SE; 1950 TN · 1972 MA; 1918 EQ
- Minor planet category: main-belt · (middle) background

Orbital characteristics
- Epoch 31 May 2020 (JD 2459000.5)
- Uncertainty parameter 0
- Observation arc: 101.19 yr (36,960 d)
- Aphelion: 3.0033 AU
- Perihelion: 2.5408 AU
- Semi-major axis: 2.7721 AU
- Eccentricity: 0.0834
- Orbital period (sidereal): 4.62 yr (1,686 d)
- Mean anomaly: 14.861°
- Mean motion: 0° 12^{m} 48.96^{s} / day
- Inclination: 8.1657°
- Longitude of ascending node: 229.83°
- Argument of perihelion: 156.02°

Physical characteristics
- Mean diameter: 27.65±1.7 km; 33.41±0.49 km; 33.500±0.071 km
- Synodic rotation period: 5.0325±0.0011 h
- Geometric albedo: 0.047±0.010; 0.048±0.002; 0.0698±0.010
- Spectral type: SMASS = C; C (SDSS-MOC)
- Absolute magnitude (H): 11.4

919 Ilsebill (prov. designation: A918 UD or 1918 EQ) is a dark background asteroid from the central region of the asteroid belt. It was discovered on 30 October 1918, by astronomer Max Wolf at the Heidelberg-Königstuhl State Observatory in southwest Germany. The carbonaceous C-type asteroid has a short rotation period of 5.0 hours and measures approximately 33 kilometers (21 miles) in diameter. It was named after "Ilsebill", a character in the fairy tale The Fisherman and his Wife by the Brothers Grimm.

== Orbit and classification ==
Ilsebill is a non-family asteroid of the main belt's background population when applying the hierarchical clustering method to its proper orbital elements. It orbits the Sun in the central asteroid belt at a distance of 2.5–3.0 AU once every 4 years and 7 months (1,686 days; semi-major axis of 2.77 AU). Its orbit has an eccentricity of 0.08 and an inclination of 8° with respect to the ecliptic. The body's observation arc begins at Heidelberg Observatory with its official discovery observation on 30 October 1918.

== Naming ==
This minor planet was named after the character "Ilsebill" in the fairy tale The Fisherman and his Wife (German: Von dem Fischer und seiner Frau) by the Brothers Grimm. The asteroid was named likely after the discoverer's death in 1932, upon a proposal made by his widow Gisela Wolf, and subsequently published by ARI (RI 1013). The naming was also mentioned in The Names of the Minor Planets by Paul Herget in 1955 (H 89).

== Physical characteristics ==
In the Bus–Binzel SMASS classification and in the SDSS-based taxonomy, Ilsebill is a common, carbonaceous C-type asteroid.

=== Rotation period ===
In October 2010, a rotational lightcurve of Ilsebill was obtained from photometric observations by Zachary Pligge, Ben Hall and Richard Ditteon at the U.S. Oakley Observatory (916) in Indiana. Lightcurve analysis gave a well-defined rotation period of 5.0325±0.0011 hours with a brightness variation of 0.25±0.02 magnitude (U=3). In September 2010, a similar, though lower rated period of 5.034±0.0010 hours with an amplitude of 0.24 was determined by astronomers at the Palomar Transient Factory in California (U=2).

A modeled lightcurve using photometric data from the Lowell Photometric Database and from the Wide-field Infrared Survey Explorer (WISE) was published in 2018. It gave a concurring sidereal period of 5.03348±0.00002 hours and includes a partial spin axis at (β_{1} = −53.0°) in ecliptic coordinates (λ, β).

=== Diameter and albedo ===
According to the survey carried out by the Infrared Astronomical Satellite IRAS, the Japanese Akari satellite, and the NEOWISE mission of NASA's WISE telescope, Ilsebill measures (27.65±1.7), (33.41±0.49) and (33.500±0.071) kilometers in diameter and its surface has a low albedo of (0.0698±0.010), (0.048±0.002) and (0.047±0.010), respectively. The Collaborative Asteroid Lightcurve Link derives its estimate from IRAS, that is, an albedo of 0.0638 and a diameter of 27.62 km based on an absolute magnitude of 11.4. Further published mean-diameters by the WISE team include (29.37±9.40 km), (32.598±7.912 km), (33.17±0.16 km), (34.444±0.254 km) and (38.64±12.97 km) with albedos between (0.027±0.046) and (0.05±0.03).
