= Friedrich Karl Arnold Schwassmann =

German astronomer

Minor planets discovered: 22
see § List of discovered minor planets

Friedrich Karl Arnold Schwassmann (25 March 1870 – 19 January 1964) was a German astronomer and a discoverer of 22 minor planets and 4 comets, who worked at AOP in Potsdam and at Bergedorf Observatory in Hamburg.

He was co-discoverer with Arno Arthur Wachmann of the periodic comets 29P/Schwassmann–Wachmann, 31P/Schwassmann–Wachmann and 73P/Schwassmann–Wachmann, and with Arno Arthur Wachmann and Leslie Peltier of the non-periodic comet C/1930 D1 (Peltier–Schwassmann–Wachmann). The main-belt asteroid 989 Schwassmannia, discovered by himself in 1922, was later named in his honor (H 94).

== List of discovered minor planets ==
- 435 Ella - 11 September 1898^{[A]}
- 436 Patricia - 13 September 1898^{[A]}
- 442 Eichsfeldia - 15 February 1899^{[A]}
- 443 Photographica - 17 February 1899^{[A]}
- 446 Aeternitas - 27 October 1899^{[A]}
- 447 Valentine - 27 October 1899^{[A]}
- 448 Natalie - 27 October 1899^{[A]}
- 449 Hamburga - 31 October 1899^{[A]}
- 450 Brigitta - 10 October 1899^{[A]}
- 454 Mathesis - 28 March 1900
- 455 Bruchsalia - 22 May 1900^{[A]}
- 456 Abnoba - 4 June 1900^{[A]}
- 457 Alleghenia - 15 September 1900^{[A]}
- 458 Hercynia - 21 September 1900^{[A]}
- 905 Universitas - 30 October 1918
- 906 Repsolda - 30 October 1918
- 912 Maritima - 27 April 1919
- 947 Monterosa - 8 February 1921
- 989 Schwassmannia - 18 November 1922
- 1192 Prisma - 17 March 1931
- 1303 Luthera - 16 March 1928
- 1310 Villigera - 28 February 1932

^{A} Co-discovery made with Max F. Wolf

== See also ==
- List of minor planet discoverers § A. Schwassmann
