= List of instrument-resolved minor planets =

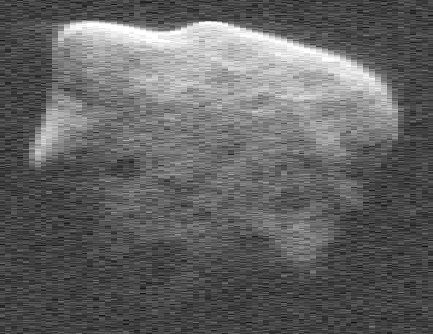
Radar image of near-Earth asteroid (53319) 1999 JM_{8}

The following list of instrument-resolved minor planets consists of minor planets whose disks have been resolved, whether by telescope, a visit by an uncrewed spacecraft, or by observing the occultation of a background star from multiple sites. Disk resolution allows the density of a body to be computed, providing useful information about the internal composition. It can also be used to determine the shape of the object, to search for albedo features, and to look for companions.

== Techniques ==
Radar imaging of (136617) 1994 CC from Goldstone during a 2009 flyby

Because of their distance from Earth and their small dimension, minor planets such as asteroids represent a challenge for astronomical instruments to resolve. Even two of the largest objects in the asteroid belt, 2 Pallas and 4 Vesta, have maximum angular diameters of less than an arcsecond. With a ground-based optical telescope, resolution of these objects through the Earth's thick atmosphere can require techniques such as speckle interferometry or adaptive optics.

Radio telescopes such as Arecibo or Goldstone have been used to observe asteroids. This technique can be used to measure the Doppler shifts and radar cross-sections of the bodies, while more detailed studies allow three-dimensional shape models to be built. The first radar detection of a minor planet was 1566 Icarus by JPL astronomer Richard M. Goldstein in June 1968. This was followed by 1685 Toro in 1972. A regular program of radar observation of the asteroid belt asteroids was begun in 1980 at Arecibo. Goldstone joined the effort in 1990. Together, they observed 37 main-belt asteroids between 1980 and 1997.

A more direct approach to asteroid study, allowing the object to be examined greater detail, is to send a spacecraft to either make a fly-by or go into orbit. The first such asteroid to be imaged in this manner was 951 Gaspra in 1991 by the Galileo spacecraft. In 2000, the NEAR Shoemaker spacecraft went into orbit around 433 Eros after making a fly-by of 253 Mathilde in 1997.

== Objects ==
The tables below list selected orbital elements and physical properties of radar-detected minor planets listed by region of the Solar System: asteroid belt, near-Earth objects, or trans-Neptunian objects. The semi-major axis (a), orbital eccentricity (e), inclination (i) to the ecliptic, and orbital period (P) is shown. Where possible, the number of decimals in maintained to the same limited level of significance in each column. This is because further detail is not needed for comparison purposes, and because the values can slightly change over time due to new measurements or gravitational perturbations. Where the SMASS spectral type is not available, the Tholen spectral type is listed in square brackets. For more detailed information on these objects, see their respective articles.

=== Asteroid belt ===
Designation	JPL Data								Notes
Designation	Orbital Elements				Rotation Period (hours)	Maximum Diameter (km)	Albedo (geometric)	SMASSII Spectral Type	Notes
Designation	a (AU)	e	i (Ecliptic)	P (years)	Rotation Period (hours)	Maximum Diameter (km)	Albedo (geometric)	SMASSII Spectral Type	Notes
1 Ceres	2.765	0.079	10.587°	4.60	9.07	952	0.090	C	
2 Pallas	2.772	0.231	34.841°	4.62	7.81	582	0.159	B	
3 Juno	2.671	0.255	12.981°	4.37	7.21	234	0.238	Sk	
4 Vesta	2.362	0.089	7.134°	3.63	5.34	529	0.423	V	
5 Astraea	2.574	0.190	5.367°	4.13	16.80	119	0.227	S	
6 Hebe	2.425	0.202	14.750°	3.78	7.27	185	0.268	S	
7 Iris	2.386	0.231	5.523°	3.69	7.14	200	0.277	S	
8 Flora	2.201	0.156	5.888°	3.27	12.87	136	0.243	[S]	
9 Metis	2.386	0.123	5.575°	3.68	5.08	190	0.118	[S]	
10 Hygiea	3.139	0.116	3.841°	5.56	27.62	407	0.072	C	
12 Victoria	2.335	0.221	8.367°	3.57	8.66	113	0.177	L	
13 Egeria	2.577	0.085	16.546°	4.14	7.05	208	0.083	Ch	
15 Eunomia	2.644	0.189	11.735°	4.30	6.08	255	0.209	S	
16 Psyche	2.921	0.137	3.099°	4.99	4.20	253	0.120	X	
17 Thetis	2.921	0.151	9.431°	4.63	12.27	90	0.172	Sl	
18 Melpomene	2.296	0.218	10.127°	3.48	11.57	141	0.223	S	
19 Fortuna	2.443	0.158	1.573°	3.82	7.44	200	0.037	Ch	
20 Massalia	2.410	0.142	0.708°	3.74	8.10	146	0.210	S	
21 Lutetia	2.435	0.163	3.064°	3.80	8.17	96	0.221	Xk	
22 Kalliope	2.910	0.101	13.717°	4.96	4.15	162	0.142	X	
23 Thalia	2.626	0.235	10.114°	4.26	12.31	108	0.254	S	
25 Phocaea	2.399	0.256	21.594°	3.72	9.93	75	0.231	S	
27 Euterpe	2.347	0.173	1.584°	3.60	10.41	96	0.162	S	
28 Bellona	2.777	0.134	5.588°	3.88	15.71	121	0.176	S	
31 Euphrosyne	3.157	0.224	26.322°	5.61	5.53	256	0.054	Cb	
33 Polyhymnia	2.866	0.338	1.871°	4.85	18.60	62	—	Sq	
34 Circe	2.689	0.106	5.504°	4.41	12.15	114	0.054	Ch	
36 Atalante	2.747	0.303	18.436°	4.55	9.93	106	0.065	C	
38 Leda	2.740	0.154	6.972°	4.54	12.84	116	0.062	Cgh	
39 Laetitia	2.768	0.115	10.382°	4.60	5.14	150	0.287	S	
41 Daphne	2.760	0.275	15.793°	4.59	5.99	174	0.083	Ch	
44 Nysa	2.424	0.148	3.706°	3.77	6.42	79	0.546	Xc	
46 Hestia	2.524	0.173	2.345°	4.01	21.04	124	0.052	Xc	
50 Virginia	2.652	0.284	2.833°	4.32	14.32	100	0.036	Ch	
52 Europa	3.097	0.107	7.480°	5.45	5.63	303	0.058	C	
53 Kalypso	2.618	0.205	5.169°	4.24	9.04	115	0.040	[XC]	
54 Alexandra	2.710	0.198	11.800°	4.46	7.02	166	0.056	C	
55 Pandora	2.759	0.143	7.188°	4.58	4.80	67	0.301	X	
60 Echo	2.392	0.184	3.602°	3.70	25.21	60	0.254	S	
63 Ausonia	2.397	0.126	5.780°	3.71	9.30	103	0.159	Sa	
64 Angelina	2.681	0.126	1.310°	4.39	8.75	51	0.157	Xe	
66 Maja	2.647	0.171	3.048°	4.31	9.73	72	0.062	Ch	
68 Leto	2.783	0.187	7.974°	4.64	14.85	123	0.228	[S]	
69 Hesperia	2.977	0.169	8.584°	5.14	5.66	138	0.140	X	
71 Niobe	2.755	0.176	23.260°	4.57	35.81	83	0.305	Xe	
78 Diana	2.620	0.207	8.703°	4.24	7.30	121	0.071	Ch	
80 Sappho	2.296	0.201	8.666°	3.48	14.03	78	0.185	S	
83 Beatrix	2.433	0.081	4.965°	3.80	10.16	81	0.092	X	
84 Klio	2.361	0.237	9.333°	3.63	23.56	79	0.053	Ch	
85 Io	2.654	0.191	11.960°	4.32	6.88	155	0.067	B	
87 Sylvia	3.493	0.083	10.858°	6.53	5.184	261	0.044	X	
88 Thisbe	2.767	0.165	5.215°	4.60	6.04	232	0.067	B	
89 Julia	2.551	0.183	16.138°	4.07	11.39	151	0.176	K	
90 Antiope	3.154	0.157	2.220°	5.60	16.51	120	0.060	C	
93 Minerva	2.754	0.142	8.562°	4.57	5.982	142	0.073	C	
95 Arethusa	3.065	0.151	13.005°	5.37	8.69	136	0.070	Ch	
96 Aegle	3.051	0.138	15.969°	5.33	13.82	170	0.052	T	
97 Klotho	2.670	0.255	11.785°	4.36	35.15	83	0.229	[M]	
101 Helena	2.582	0.142	10.203°	4.15	23.08	66	0.190	S	
105 Artemis	2.376	0.176	21.455°	3.66	37.16	119	0.047	Ch	
107 Camilla	3.495	0.073	10.038°	6.53	4.84	223	0.053	X	
109 Felicitas	2.697	0.298	7.885°	4.43	13.19	89	0.070	Ch	
110 Lydia	2.732	0.078	5.973°	4.52	10.93	86	0.181	X	
111 Ate	2.594	0.103	4.930°	4.18	22.2	135	0.061	Ch	
114 Kassandra	2.676	0.137	4.937°	4.38	10.76	100	0.088	Xk	
127 Johanna	2.756	0.065	8.242°	4.57	12.80	122	—	Ch	
128 Nemesis	2.751	0.125	6.248°	4.56	39	188	0.050	C	
129 Antigone	2.870	0.212	12.212°	4.86	4.96	113	0.164	X	
130 Elektra	3.124	0.209	22.866°	5.52	5.23	182	0.076	Ch	
135 Hertha	2.429	0.206	2.304°	3.79	8.40	98	0.144	Xk	
137 Meliboea	3.120	0.218	13.414°	5.51	25.68	145	0.050	[C]	
139 Juewa	2.782	0.175	10.907°	4.64	20.99	157	0.056	X	
144 Vibilia	2.653	0.236	4.808°	4.32	13.82	142	0.060	Ch	
145 Adeona	2.672	0.145	12.639°	4.37	15.09	151	0.043	Ch	
152 Atala	3.142	0.076	12.113°	5.57	6.25	65	—	S	
158 Koronis	2.869	0.054	1.001°	4.86	14.22	35	0.277	S	
165 Loreley	3.123	0.085	11.227°	5.52	7.23	155	0.064	Cb	
167 Urda	2.852	0.033	2.211°	4.82	13.07	40	0.223	Sk	
182 Elsa	2.416	0.186	2.004°	3.75	80.09	44	0.208	S	
192 Nausikaa	2.402	0.246	6.816°	3.72	13.63	103	0.233	Cl	
198 Ampella	2.459	0.229	9.311°	3.86	20.78	57	0.252	S	
208 Lacrimosa	2.891	0.015	1.749°	4.92	14.09	41	0.270	Sk	
211 Isolda	3.040	0.163	3.883°	5.30	18.37	143	0.060	Ch	
216 Kleopatra	2.797	0.249	13.100°	4.68	5.39	124	0.116	Xe	
224 Oceana	2.646	0.045	5.838°	4.30	9.39	62	0.169	[M]	
225 Henrietta	3.391	0.265	20.873°	6.24	7.36	120	0.040	[F]	
230 Athamantis	2.383	0.062	9.440°	3.68	24.01	109	0.171	Sl	
243 Ida	2.860	0.042	1.133°	4.84	4.63	32	0.238	S	
247 Eukrate	2.741	0.243	24.999°	4.54	12.10	134	0.060	Xc	
253 Mathilde	2.645	0.267	6.743°	4.30	417.7	53	0.044	Cb	
266 Aline	2.804	0.158	13.401°	4.69	12.3	109	0.045	Ch	
270 Anahita	2.199	0.151	2.366°	3.26	15.06	51	0.217	[S]	
276 Adelheid	3.114	0.071	21.651°	5.50	6.32	122	0.045	[X]	
288 Glauke	2.759	0.208	4.326°	4.58	1200	32	0.197	S	
302 Clarissa	2.406	0.111	3.413°	3.73	14.38	39	0.052	[F]	
306 Unitas	2.358	0.150	7.269°	3.62	8.74	47	0.211	S	
313 Chaldaea	2.375	0.181	11.654°	3.66	8.39	96	0.052	[C]	
324 Bamberga	2.686	0.337	11.103°	4.40	29.43	229	0.063	[CP]	
325 Heidelberga	3.209	0.160	8.559°	5.75	6.74	76	0.107	[M]	
336 Lacadiera	2.252	0.096	5.652°	3.38	13.70	69	0.046	Xk	
347 Pariana	2.611	0.166	11.681°	4.22	4.05	51	0.185	[M]	
354 Eleonora	2.798	0.115	18.392°	4.68	4.28	155	0.195	Sl	
356 Liguria	2.757	0.238	8.227°	4.58	31.8	131	0.053	[C]	
372 Palma	3.150	0.261	23.835°	5.59	8.57	189	0.066	B	
375 Ursula	3.123	0.107	15.949°	5.52	16.83	216	—	Xc	
393 Lampetia	2.776	0.332	14.880°	4.63	38.7	97	0.083	Xc	
405 Thia	2.584	0.244	11.950°	4.15	10.08	125	0.047	Ch	
409 Aspasia	2.576	0.072	11.260°	4.13	9.02	162	0.061	Xc	
429 Lotis	2.607	0.124	9.535°	4.21	13.58	70	0.043	[C]	
444 Gyptis	2.770	0.174	10.283°	4.61	6.21	163	0.049	C	
471 Papagena	2.886	0.233	14.979°	4.90	7.11	134	0.199	S	
488 Kreusa	3.175	0.162	11.484°	5.66	19.26	150	0.059	[C]	
497 Iva	2.857	0.296	4.809°	4.83.0	4.62	45	—	[M]	
505 Cava	2.685	0.245	9.841°	4.40	8.18	115	0.040	[FC]	
532 Herculina	2.770	0.178	16.314°	4.61	9.41	222	0.169	S	
554 Peraga	2.375	0.153	2.935°	3.66	13.7	96	0.050	Ch	
622 Esther	2.415	0.243	8.645°	3.75	47.5	—	—	S	
624 Hektor	5.242	0.023	18.181°	12.00	6.92	225	0.025	[D]	
654 Zelinda	2.297	0.231	18.120°	3.48	31.74	127	0.043	Ch	
678 Fredegundis	2.574	0.219	6.082°	4.13	11.616	42	0.249	X	
694 Ekard	2.669	0.325	15.843°	4.36	5.93	91	0.046	[CP]	
704 Interamnia	3.059	0.151	17.296°	5.35	8.73	317	0.074	B	
747 Winchester	2.999	0.341	18.168°	5.19	9.41	172	0.050	C	
758 Mancunia	3.189	0.152	5.605°	5.69	12.73	85	0.132	[X]	
771 Libera	2.650	0.248	14.944°	4.31	5.89	29	0.130	X	
779 Nina	2.666	0.224	14.574°	4.35	11.2	77	0.144	X	
785 Zwetana	2.574	0.209	12.750°	4.13	8.89	49	0.125	Cb	
796 Sarita	2.637	0.318	19.043°	4.28	8.18	45	0.197	X	
849 Ara	3.150	0.198	19.526°	5.59	4.12	62	0.266	[M]	
914 Palisana	2.458	0.212	25.218°	3.85	15.92	77	0.094	[CU]	
925 Alphonsina	2.700	0.080	21.063°	4.44	7.88	54	0.279	S	
951 Gaspra	2.209	0.173	4.102°	3.28	7.04	12	—	X	
1139 Atami	1.948	0.255	13.087°	2.72	27.45	5–6	—	S	
1263 Varsavia	2.666	0.187	29.268°	4.35	7.23	49	0.046	Xc	
1580 Betulia	2.196	0.4880	52.11°	3.25	6.13	5.8	0.08	[C]	
1963 Bezovec	2.422	0.211	25.046°	3.77	18.16	45	0.038	[C]	
2685 Masursky	2.568	0.111	12.135°	4.11	—	20	—	—	
2867 Šteins	2.364	0.146	9.943°	3.63	6.05	5.3	—	—	
4179 Toutatis	2.530	0.629	0.446°	4.02	176	5.4	—	Sk	
4486 Mithra	2.203	0.661	3.037°	3.27	67	2	—	—	
5535 Annefrank	2.213	0.064	4.246°	3.29	—	6.6	—	—	
6489 Golevka	2.498	0.605	2.277°	3.95	6.02	0.5	0.151	[Q]	
9969 Braille	2.346	0.431	28.918°	3.59	226.4	2.1	—	[Q]	

=== Near-Earth asteroids ===
Designation	JPL Data								Notes
Designation	Orbital Elements				Rotation Period (hours)	Maximum Diameter (km)	Albedo (geometric)	SMASSII Spectral Type	Notes
Designation	a (AU)	e	i (Ecliptic)	P (years)	Rotation Period (hours)	Maximum Diameter (km)	Albedo (geometric)	SMASSII Spectral Type	Notes
433 Eros	1.458	0.223	10.828°	1.76	5.27	17	0.25	S	
1566 Icarus	1.078	0.827	22.828°	1.12	2.27	1.0	0.51	—	
1620 Geographos	1.246	0.335	13.336°	1.39	5.22	2.6	0.326	S	
1627 Ivar	1.863	0.397	8.449°	2.54	4.80	9.1	0.15	S	
1685 Toro	1.367	0.436	9.380°	1.60	10.2	3.4	0.31	S	
1862 Apollo	1.470	0.560	6.354°	1.78	3.07	1.5	0.25	Q	
2062 Aten	0.967	0.183	18.934°	0.95	40.8	1.1	0.26	Sr	
2063 Bacchus	1.078	0.349	9.433°	1.12	14.90	2	—	Sq	
2100 Ra-Shalom	0.832	0.436	15.758°	0.76	19.80	2.3	0.13	Xc	
2101 Adonis	1.875	0.764	1.333°	2.57	—	0.6	—	—	
3103 Eger	1.405	0.354	20.932°	1.66	5.71	1.5	0.64	Xe	
3908 Nyx	1.927	0.459	2.182°	2.68	4.43	1.0	0.23	V	
4544 Xanthus	1.042	0.250	14.146°	1.06	37.7	1.3	—	—	
4769 Castalia	1.063	0.483	8.888°	1.10	4.10	1.4	—	—	
5381 Sekhmet	0.947	0.296	48.970°	0.92	2.7	1.0	—	—	
(6178) 1986 DA	2.818	0.583	4.309°	4.73	3.50	2.3	0.15	—	
(7822) 1991 CS	1.123	0.165	37.121°	1.19	2.39	0.2	0.14	S	
25143 Itokawa	1.324	0.280	1.622°	1.52	12.13	0.5	—	S(IV)	
(53319) 1999 JM8	2.708	0.649	13.830°	4.46	136	7	—	[X]	
66391 Moshup	0.642	0.688	38.888°	0.51	2.76	1.3	—	S:	
(136617) 1994 CC	1.638	0.417	4.683°	2.10	2.389	0.6	—	[Sq]	
1998 KY26	1.232	0.201	1.481°	1.37	0.19	0.03	—	—	
(612901) 2004 XP14	1.052	0.159	32.950°	1.08	100	0.3	—	[E or M]	

=== Trans-Neptunian objects ===
Designation	JPL Data								Notes
Designation	Orbital Elements				Rotation Period (hours)	Maximum Diameter (km)	Albedo (geometric)	SMASSII Spectral Type	Notes
Designation	a (AU)	e	i (Ecliptic)	P (years)	Rotation Period (hours)	Maximum Diameter (km)	Albedo (geometric)	SMASSII Spectral Type	Notes
50000 Quaoar	43.270	0.039	7.996	284.64	17.68	—	—	—	
134340 Pluto	39.445	0.250	17.089°	247.74	153.29	—	—	—	
136199 Eris	68.071	0.434	43.818°	561.63	25.9	—	—	—	

== See also ==
- Steven J. Ostro
