= 1303 Luthera =

Asteroid

Discovery
- Discovered by: A. Schwassmann
- Discovery site: Bergedorf Obs.
- Discovery date: 16 March 1928

Designations
- Named after: Robert Luther (German astronomer)
- Alternative designations: 1928 FP · 1926 XD; 1928 HH · 1972 VP_{1} A917 KC
- Minor planet category: main-belt · (outer); Luthera

Orbital characteristics
- Epoch 4 September 2017 (JD 2458000.5)
- Uncertainty parameter 0
- Observation arc: 89.60 yr (32,726 days)
- Aphelion: 3.5680 AU
- Perihelion: 2.8910 AU
- Semi-major axis: 3.2295 AU
- Eccentricity: 0.1048
- Orbital period (sidereal): 5.80 yr (2,120 days)
- Mean anomaly: 198.00°
- Mean motion: 0° 10^{m} 11.28^{s} / day
- Inclination: 19.491°
- Longitude of ascending node: 72.049°
- Argument of perihelion: 100.43°

Physical characteristics
- Dimensions: 81.685±0.494 km 85.08 km (derived); 87.15±1.13 km 90.65±25.04 km 91.35±24.52 km 92.118±2.084 km 112.74±1.41 km
- Synodic rotation period: 5.878±0.003 h 7.92±0.05 h
- Geometric albedo: 0.024±0.003; 0.0387 (derived); 0.04±0.02; 0.04±0.03; 0.0523±0.0093; 0.059±0.002
- Spectral type: C
- Absolute magnitude (H): 9.00 · 9.40 · 9.5 · 9.51

The asteroid 1303 Luthera, with the provisional designation 1928 FP, is a dark asteroid and the parent body of the Luthera family, located in the outermost regions of the asteroid belt. It measures approximately 90 kilometers in diameter. The asteroid was discovered on 16 March 1928, by astronomer Friedrich Schwassmann at the Bergedorf Observatory in Hamburg, Germany, and later named after German astronomer Robert Luther.

== Orbit and classification ==
Luthera is the parent body of the Luthera family (904), a smaller asteroid family of less than 200 known members. It orbits the Sun in the outermost asteroid belt at a distance of 2.9–3.6 AU once every 5 years and 10 months (2,120 days; semi-major axis of 3.23 AU). Its orbit has an eccentricity of 0.10 and an inclination of 19° with respect to the ecliptic.

The asteroid was first observed as A917 KC at Simeiz Observatory in May 2017. The body's observation arc begins at Heidelberg Observatory in April 1928, or one month after its official discovery observation at Bergedorf.

== Physical characteristics ==
Due to its low geometric albedo, Luthera is an assumed carbonaceous C-type asteroid, while the overall spectral type for members of the Luthera family is that of an X-type.

=== Rotation period ===
In February 2008, a rotational lightcurve of Luthera was obtained from photometric observations by Mexican astronomer Pedro Sada at the University of Monterrey, Mexico. Lightcurve analysis gave a short rotation period of 5.878 hours with a low brightness variation of 0.05 magnitude, indicative for a nearly spherical shape (U=3). A lower-rated lightcurve with a period of 7.92 hours and an amplitude of 0.06 magnitude was obtained by French amateur astronomer Pierre Antonini in May 2009 (U=2).

=== Diameter and albedo ===
According to the surveys carried out by the Japanese Akari satellite and the NEOWISE mission of NASA's Wide-field Infrared Survey Explorer, Luthera measures between 81.685 and 112.74 kilometers in diameter and its surface has a low albedo between 0.024 and 0.059.

The Collaborative Asteroid Lightcurve Link derives an albedo of 0.0387 and a diameter of 85.08 kilometers based on an absolute magnitude of 9.5.

== Naming ==
This minor planet was named after German astronomer Karl Theodor Robert Luther (1822–1900), who was a discoverer of minor planets himself, most notably 17 Thetis, 90 Antiope (binary) and 288 Glauke (slow rotator). The official naming citation was mentioned in The Names of the Minor Planets by Paul Herget in 1955 (H 119). The lunar crater Luther has also been named after him.
