= 258 Tyche =

Main belt asteroid

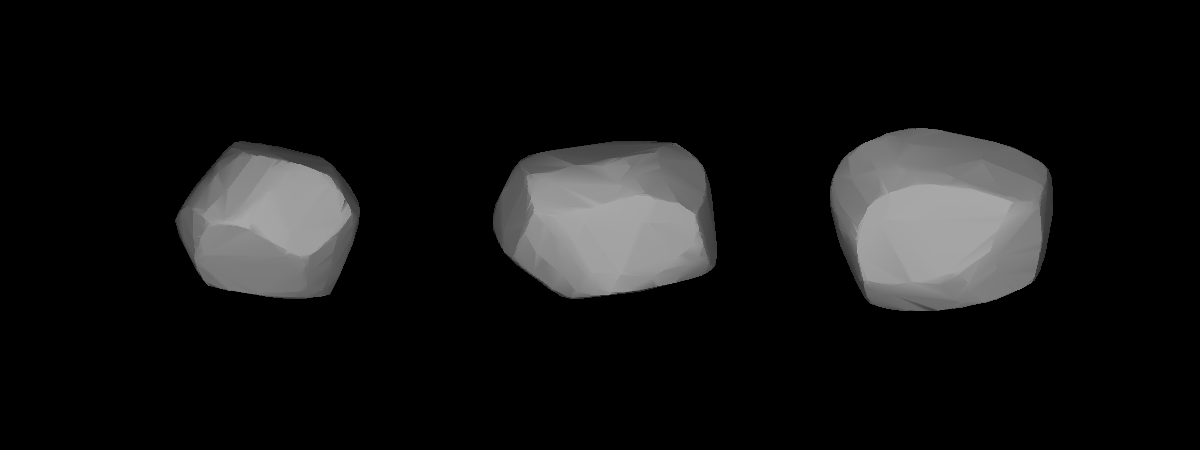
- Light curve-based 3D-model of 258 Tyche

Discovery
- Discovered by: R. Luther
- Discovery site: Düsseldorf-Bilk Obs.
- Discovery date: 4 May 1886

Designations
- Pronunciation: /ˈtaɪkiː/
- Named after: Tyche
- Alternative designations: A886 JA
- Minor planet category: Eunomia · main-belt

Orbital characteristics
- Epoch 31 July 2016 (JD 2457600.5)
- Uncertainty parameter 0
- Observation arc: 129.95 yr (47465 d)
- Aphelion: 3.1512 AU (471.41 Gm)
- Perihelion: 2.0838 AU (311.73 Gm)
- Semi-major axis: 2.6175 AU (391.57 Gm)
- Eccentricity: 0.20390
- Orbital period (sidereal): 4.23 yr (1546.8 d)
- Average orbital speed: 18.42 km/s
- Mean anomaly: 157.95°
- Mean motion: 0° 13^{m} 57.864^{s} / day
- Inclination: 14.305°
- Longitude of ascending node: 207.59°
- Argument of perihelion: 155.01°
- Earth MOID: 1.09016 AU (163.086 Gm)
- Jupiter MOID: 2.34517 AU (350.832 Gm)
- T_{Jupiter}: 3.334

Physical characteristics
- Dimensions: 64.78±1.2 km 65 km
- Mass: ~ 4×10^{17} kg (estimate)
- Mean density: ~ 2.7 g/cm^{3}
- Synodic rotation period: 10.041 h (0.4184 d)
- Geometric albedo: 0.1676±0.006; 0.168
- Temperature: ~ 169 K max: 268 K
- Spectral type: B–V = 0.876; U–B = 0.459; S (Tholen), S (SMASS)
- Absolute magnitude (H): 8.50

258 Tyche is a relatively large main belt asteroid discovered by Robert Luther at Düsseldorf-Bilk Observatory on 4 May 1886. The stony S-type asteroid measures about 65 kilometers in diameter and has a perihelion of 2.1 AU.

Tyche orbits very close to the Eunomia family of asteroids, and could be a member based on composition. However, it is larger than all family members apart from 15 Eunomia while lying at the very edge of the family group. Hence, there is a good chance that it is an unrelated interloper.

There is some uncertainty regarding Tyche's rotation period. Various authors give values from 9.983 to 10.041 hours.

It was named after the Greek goddess of fortune, Tyche, which is also the name of one of the Oceanids. Tyche's Roman equivalent is Fortuna, after which the asteroid 19 Fortuna is named.
