= 113 Amalthea =

Main-belt asteroid

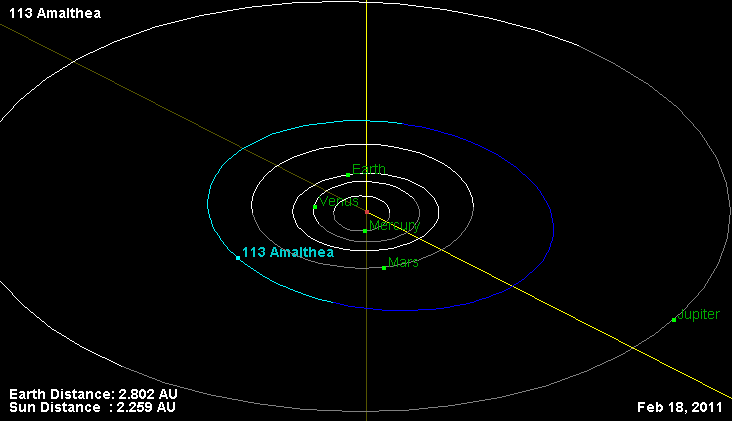
- Orbital diagram

Discovery
- Discovered by: R. Luther
- Discovery site: Bilk Obs.
- Discovery date: 12 March 1871

Designations
- Pronunciation: /æməlˈθiːə/
- Named after: Amalthea
- Alternative designations: A871 EA; 1931 TN_{3}; 1951 CY
- Minor planet category: main-belt · Flora

Orbital characteristics
- Epoch 31 July 2016 (JD 2457600.5)
- Uncertainty parameter 0
- Observation arc: 144.90 yr (52926 d)
- Aphelion: 2.5819 AU (386.25 Gm)
- Perihelion: 2.17010 AU (324.642 Gm)
- Semi-major axis: 2.37598 AU (355.442 Gm)
- Eccentricity: 0.086651
- Orbital period (sidereal): 3.66 yr (1337.7 d)
- Mean anomaly: 226.48°
- Mean motion: 0° 16^{m} 8.832^{s} / day
- Inclination: 5.0422°
- Longitude of ascending node: 123.486°
- Argument of perihelion: 79.118°

Physical characteristics
- Mean diameter: 46.14±1.4 km
- Mass: (2.40±0.75)×10^{17} kg (Note: Calculated from its standard gravitational parameter GM = 0.016±0.005 km^{3}/s^{2}.)
- Mean density: 3.66 g/cm^{3} (Note: Assuming a diameter of 50.1 km.)
- Synodic rotation period: 9.950 h (0.4146 d)
- Geometric albedo: 0.2649±0.017
- Spectral type: S
- Absolute magnitude (H): 8.74

113 Amalthea (/æməlˈθiːə/) is a stony Florian asteroid from the inner regions of the asteroid belt, approximately 50 kilometers (31 miles) in diameter. It was discovered on 12 March 1871, by German astronomer Robert Luther at the Bilk Observatory in Düsseldorf, Germany. The elongated S-type asteroid has a rotation period of 9.95 hours. It was named after Amalthea from Greek mythology. A purported satellite of Amalthea was announced in July 2017, but was later found to be a software error in July 2021.

== Description ==
Amalthea is thought to be a fragment from the mantle of a Vesta-sized, 300–600 km diameter parent body that broke up around one billion years ago, with the other major remnant being 9 Metis. The spectrum of Amalthea reveals the presence of the mineral olivine, a relative rarity in the asteroid belt.

Based on observations made during a stellar occultation by Amalthea of a 10th-magnitude star on 14 March 2017, it was announced in July 2017 that the asteroid has a small, 5-kilometer-sized satellite, provisionally designated S/2017 (113) 1. However, the satellite was later retracted as a software-reduction coding error on 17 July 2021. The occultation also indicated that Amalthea has a distinctly elongated shape.

One of Jupiter's inner small satellites, unrelated to 113 Amalthea, is also called Amalthea, as is an (apparently fictional) small Arjuna asteroid in Neal Stephenson's 2015 novel Seveneves.
