= 241 Germania =

Main-belt asteroid

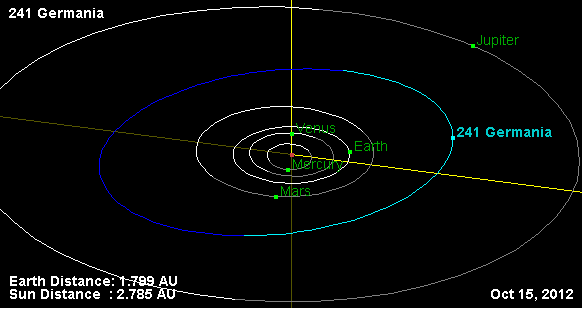
- Orbit diagram of Germania

Discovery
- Discovered by: Robert Luther
- Discovery date: 12 September 1884

Designations
- Pronunciation: /dʒərˈmeɪniə/
- Named after: Germany
- Alternative designations: A884 RA; 1953 US; 1953 VK_{1}
- Minor planet category: Main belt
- Adjectives: Germanian

Orbital characteristics
- Epoch 31 July 2016 (JD 2457600.5)
- Uncertainty parameter 0
- Observation arc: 141.38 yr (51640 d)
- Aphelion: 3.36950 AU (504.070 Gm)
- Perihelion: 2.72240 AU (407.265 Gm)
- Semi-major axis: 3.04595 AU (455.668 Gm)
- Eccentricity: 0.106224
- Orbital period (sidereal): 5.316 yr (1941.7 d)
- Average orbital speed: 17.04 km/s
- Mean anomaly: 277.959°
- Mean motion: 0° 11^{m} 6.598^{s} / day
- Inclination: 5.51789°
- Longitude of ascending node: 270.134°
- Argument of perihelion: 78.9146°

Physical characteristics
- Dimensions: 168.90±3.1 km 181.55±6.81 km 169 km
- Mass: (4.84±0.34)×10^{18} kg (Note: Calculated from its standard gravitational parameter GM = 0.323±0.023 km^{3}/s^{2}.)
- Mean density: 1.92 g/cm^{3}
- Synodic rotation period: 15.51 h (0.646 d)
- Geometric albedo: 0.0575±0.002
- Spectral type: CP/B; B-V = 0.689±0.015; U-B = 0.289±0.034
- Absolute magnitude (H): 7.73

241 Germania is a very large main-belt asteroid. It was discovered by Robert Luther on 12 September 1884 in Düsseldorf. Germania is named after Germany.

The object measures approximately 169 to 182 km in diameter and rotates on its axis once every 16 hours. It is classified as a B-type asteroid and is probably composed of dark, primitive carbonaceous material.

== Discovery ==
Germania was discovered by Robert Luther on 12 September 1884 in Düsseldorf.

== Naming ==
The object is named after Germany, Germania is the Latin name for Germany.

== Observations ==
The observation arc of Germania began on 24 November 1884 and was last observed on 14 April 2026. Giving it a long observation arc of 141 years. In these 141 years, Germania has been observed 6571 times.

== Orbit ==
Germania is a main belt asteroid that orbits the Sun at a distance of 2.722–3.695 astronomical units (AU) with a semi-major axis or average orbital distance of 3.046 AU once every 5.32 years (for reference, Ceres's orbit is at 2.77 AU).

Germania's orbit has an eccentricity of 0.1062 and an inclination of 5.518° with respect to the ecliptic.

== Physical characteristics ==
=== Size, mass, density and rotation ===
Germania has a diameter of approximately 169 to 182 km, with a geometric albedo of 0.0575±0.002. Germania has a mass of 4.8×10^{18} kg and a density of 1.9 g/cm^{3}. Germania rotates on its axis once every 15.51 hours.

=== Composition and spectrum ===
Germania is classified as a B-type asteroid and is likely composed of dark, primitive carbonaceous material. The B-V color index of Germania is measured at 0.689±0.015, which suggests a neutral and grey color for the object.

== See also ==
- List of minor planets: 1–1000
- List of exceptional asteroids
