= Robert Luther =

German astronomer (1822–1900)

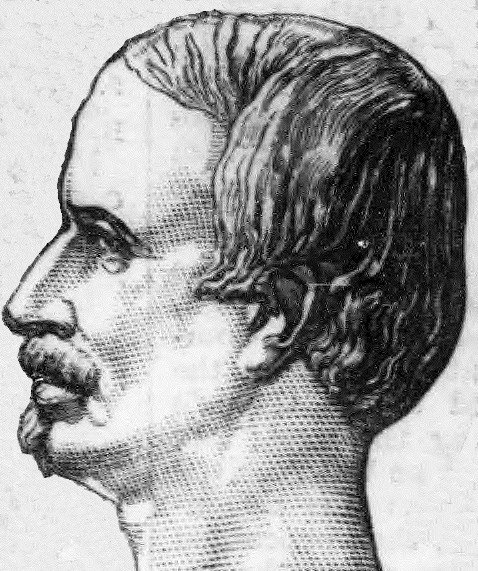
- Robert Luther on a commemorative medal
- Born: 16 April 1822; Świdnica, Kingdom of Prussia
- Died: 15 February 1900 (aged 77); Düsseldorf, Germany
- Known for: discovery of 24 asteroids
- Awards: Lalande Prize (1852, 1853, 1854, 1855, 1859, 1860 and 1861)
- Scientific career
- Academic advisors: Johann Franz Encke

Karl Theodor Robert Luther (16 April 1822, Świdnica – 15 February 1900 Düsseldorf), normally published as Robert Luther, was a German astronomer. While working at the Bilk Observatory in Düsseldorf, Germany, he searched for asteroids and discovered 24 of them between 1852 and 1890. Seven times Lalande Prize winner.

== Biography ==
Karl Theodor Robert Luther was born on 16 April 1822 to August Luther and Wilhelmine von Ende. He was home schooled and studied in the local high school. In 1841, he moved to Breslau where he studied until 1843.

In 1843 Luther moved to Berlin to study astronomy. He was a student of Johann Franz Encke and helped him in his astronomical calculations and creating the astronomical almanac. In 1850 he became a second observer. In 1851, Franz Brünnow invited Luther to the Düsseldorf-Bilk Observatory to become a director of the observatory after him.

Luther married Caroline (nee Marker) and they had one son, William. Luther died in 1900 after a short illness in Düsseldorf.

== Discoveries ==
Luther discovered 24 asteroids between 1852 and 1890.

Two of his discoveries are now known to have unusual properties: 90 Antiope, a binary asteroid with equal components, and the extremely slow-rotating 288 Glauke.

Asteroids discovered: 24
17 Thetis	17 April 1852
26 Proserpina	5 May 1853
28 Bellona	1 March 1854
35 Leukothea	18 April 1855
37 Fides	5 October 1855
47 Aglaja	15 September 1857
50 Virginia^{[1]}	19 October 1857
53 Kalypso	4 April 1858
57 Mnemosyne	22 September 1859
58 Concordia	24 March 1860
68 Leto	29 April 1861
71 Niobe	13 August 1861
78 Diana	15 March 1863
82 Alkmene	27 November 1864
84 Klio	25 August 1865
90 Antiope	1 October 1866
95 Arethusa	23 November 1867
108 Hecuba	2 April 1869
113 Amalthea	12 March 1871
118 Peitho	15 March 1872
134 Sophrosyne	27 September 1873
241 Germania	12 September 1884
247 Eukrate	14 March 1885
258 Tyche	4 May 1886
288 Glauke	20 February 1890
^{1} discovered independently 15 days after James Ferguson, but reported first

== Honors and awards ==
The asteroid 1303 Luthera and the lunar crater Luther were named in his honour.

He was awarded the Lalande Prize seven times, in 1852, 1853, 1854, 1855, 1859, 1860 and 1861.

Royal Astronomical Society Fellow since June 1854.

In 1869, a commemorative medal honoring the discovery of the 100th asteroid shows the profiles of John Russell Hind, Hermann Goldschmidt and Robert Luther.
