= 108 Hecuba =

Main-belt asteroid

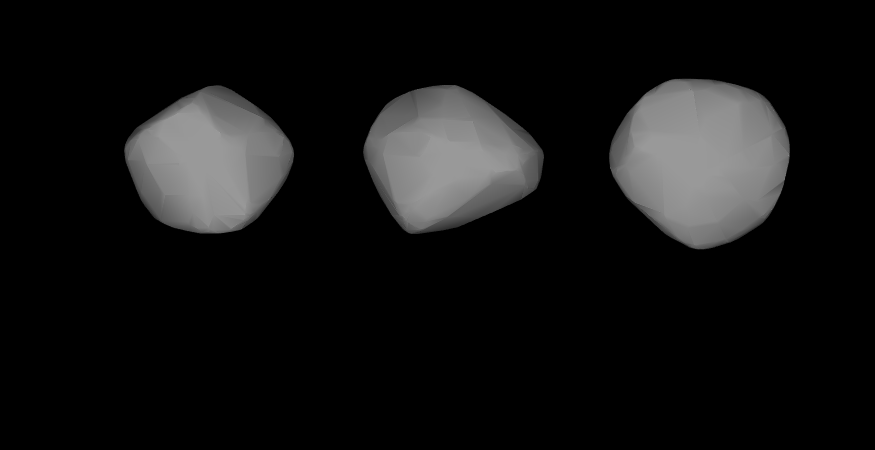
- 108 Hecuba 3D Lightcurve model

Discovery
- Discovered by: R. Luther
- Discovery date: 2 April 1869

Designations
- Pronunciation: /ˈhɛkjʊbə/
- Named after: Hecuba
- Minor planet category: Main belt

Orbital characteristics
- Epoch 31 July 2016 (JD 2457600.5)
- Uncertainty parameter 0
- Observation arc: 135.87 yr (49628 d)
- Aphelion: 3.4190 AU (511.48 Gm)
- Perihelion: 3.05922 AU (457.653 Gm)
- Semi-major axis: 3.23912 AU (484.565 Gm)
- Eccentricity: 0.055539
- Orbital period (sidereal): 5.83 yr (2129.3 d)
- Average orbital speed: 16.53 km/s
- Mean anomaly: 166.649°
- Mean motion: 0° 10^{m} 8.648^{s} / day
- Inclination: 4.2204°
- Longitude of ascending node: 350.014°
- Argument of perihelion: 204.634°
- Earth MOID: 2.05833 AU (307.922 Gm)
- Jupiter MOID: 1.55152 AU (232.104 Gm)
- T_{Jupiter}: 3.178

Physical characteristics
- Mean diameter: 69+3 −1 km (pole solution 1); 70 ± 2 km (pole solution 2)
- Mass: ~3.9×10^{17} kg (estimate)
- Mean density: ~2.7 g/cm^{3} (estimate)
- Equatorial surface gravity: ~0.025 m/s² (estimate)
- Equatorial escape velocity: ~0.040 km/s (estimate)
- Synodic rotation period: 14.25662±0.00003 h
- Pole ecliptic longitude: 181° ± 2° or 352° ± 1°
- Pole ecliptic latitude: 42° ± 5° or 39° ± 6°
- Geometric albedo: 0.24+0.04 −0.01
| Surface temp. | min | mean | max |
|---|---|---|---|
| Kelvin | | ~148 | 215 |
| Celsius | | | -58 |
- Spectral type: S
- Absolute magnitude (H): 8.09

108 Hecuba is a fairly large and bright main-belt asteroid. It was discovered by Karl Theodor Robert Luther on 2 April 1869, and named after Hecuba, wife of King Priam in the legends of the Trojan War in Greek Mythology. This object is orbiting the Sun with a period of 5.83 years and an eccentricity of 0.06. It became the first asteroid discovered to orbit near a 2:1 mean-motion resonance with the planet Jupiter, and is the namesake of the Hecuba group of asteroids.

In the Tholen classification system, it is categorized as a stony S-type asteroid, while the Bus asteroid taxonomy system lists it as an Sw asteroid. Observations performed at the Palmer Divide Observatory in Colorado Springs, Colorado in during 2007 produced a light curve with a period of 17.859 ± 0.005 hours with a brightness variation of 0.11 ± 0.02 in magnitude.

Hecuba orbits within the Hygiea family of asteroids but is not otherwise related to other family members because it has a silicate composition; Hygieas are dark C-type asteroids.
