= 35 Leukothea =

Main-belt asteroid

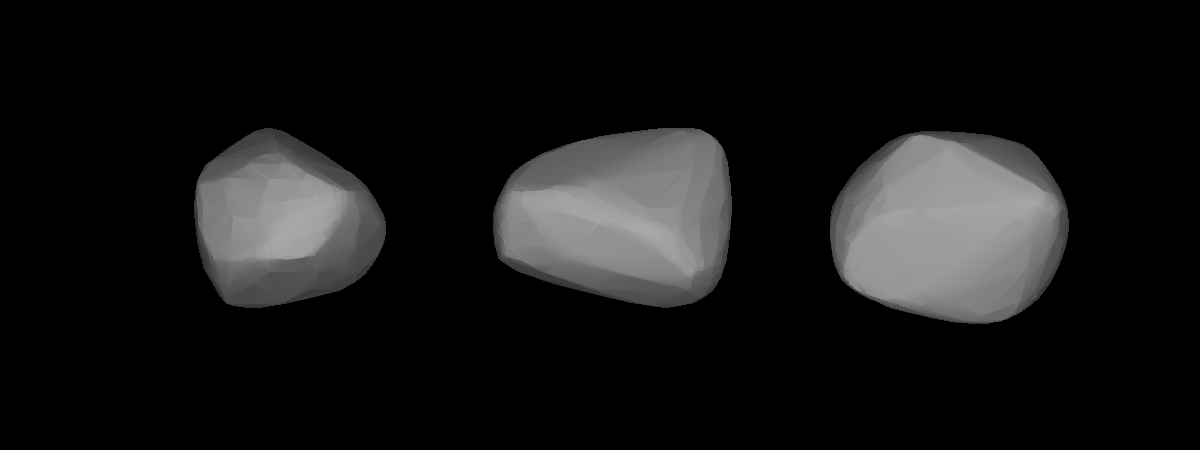
- Three-dimensional model of 35 Leukothea created based on its light-curve

Discovery
- Discovered by: R. Luther
- Discovery date: 19 April 1855

Designations
- Designation: (35) Leukothea
- Pronunciation: /ljuːˈkɒθiə/
- Named after: Λευκοθέα Leykothea
- Alternative names: 1948 DC; 1950 RS_{1}; 1976 WH
- Minor planet category: Main belt
- Adjectives: Leukothean /ljuːˈkɒθiən/
- Symbol: (historical)

Orbital characteristics
- Epoch 21 November 2025 (JD 2461000.5)
- Aphelion: 3.659 AU
- Perihelion: 2.353 AU
- Semi-major axis: 3.006 AU
- Eccentricity: 0.217
- Orbital period (sidereal): 5.211 yr (1903.34 d)
- Average orbital speed: 17.00 km/s
- Mean anomaly: 309.117°
- Inclination: 7.866°
- Longitude of ascending node: 352.910°
- Argument of perihelion: 215.440°
- Jupiter MOID: 1.357 AU
- T_{Jupiter}: 3.201

Physical characteristics
- Mean diameter: 103.05 ± 1.2 km
- Mass: (1.014 ± 0.491/0.321)×10^{18} kg
- Mean density: 1.769 ± 0.857/0.56 g/cm^{3}
- Escape velocity: ~0.0513 km/s
- Synodic rotation period: 31.900 h
- Albedo: 0.066
- Temperature: ~162 K
- Spectral type: C
- Absolute magnitude (H): 8.5

35 Leukothea is a large, dark asteroid from the asteroid belt. It was discovered by German astronomer Karl Theodor Robert Luther on 19 April 1855, and named after Leukothea, a sea goddess in Greek mythology. Its historical symbol was a pharos (ancient lighthouse); it was encoded in Unicode 17.0 as U+1CED0 𜻐.

Leukothea is a C-type asteroid in the Tholen classification system, suggesting a carbonaceous composition. It is orbiting the Sun with a period of 5.17 years and has a cross-sectional size of 103.1 km.

Photometric observations of this asteroid from the Organ Mesa Observatory in Las Cruces, New Mexico during 2010 gave a light curve with a rotation period of 31.900±0.001 hours and a brightness variability of 0.42±0.04 in magnitude. This is consistent with previous studies in 1990 and 2008.

The computed Lyapunov time for this asteroid is 20,000 years, indicating that it occupies a chaotic orbit that will change randomly over time because of gravitational perturbations of the planets.
