= 57 Mnemosyne =

Main-belt asteroid

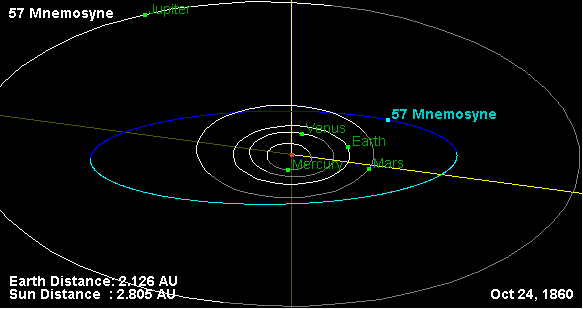
- Orbital diagram

Discovery
- Discovered by: Karl Theodor Robert Luther
- Discovery date: 22 September 1859

Designations
- Pronunciation: /nɪˈmɒsɪniː/
- Named after: Mnemosyne
- Minor planet category: Main belt
- Adjectives: Mnemosynean /ˌnɛməsɪˈniːən/, Mnemosynian /nɛməˈsɪniən/

Orbital characteristics
- Epoch December 31, 2006 (JD 2454100.5)
- Aphelion: 526.785 Gm (3.521 AU)
- Perihelion: 415.379 Gm (2.777 AU)
- Semi-major axis: 471.082 Gm (3.149 AU)
- Eccentricity: 0.118
- Orbital period (sidereal): 2,041.056 d (5.59 a)
- Mean anomaly: 68.001°
- Inclination: 15.200°
- Longitude of ascending node: 199.337°
- Argument of perihelion: 212.848°

Physical characteristics
- Dimensions: 112.59±2.8 km
- Mass: (2.4±2.5)×10^{18} kg (Note: Calculated from its standard gravitational parameter GM = 0.16±0.17 km^{3}/s^{2}.) (SB441)
- Mean density: 3.2±3.4 g/cm^{3} (calculated)
- Synodic rotation period: 25.324±0.002 h
- Geometric albedo: 0.215
- Spectral type: S
- Absolute magnitude (H): 7.03

57 Mnemosyne is a large main belt asteroid. It is a stony S-type asteroid in composition. This object was discovered by Robert Luther on 22 September 1859 in Düsseldorf. Its name was chosen by Martin Hoek, the director of the Utrecht Observatory, in reference to Mnemosyne, a Titaness in Greek mythology.

This asteroid is orbiting in the outer main belt at a distance of 3.149 AU from the Sun with an eccentricity (ovalness) of 0.118 and a period of 5.58811 a. The orbital plane is inclined at an angle of 15.2° to the ecliptic. The orbital period of this asteroid is close to a 2:1 commensurability with Jupiter, which made it useful for perturbation measurements to derive the mass of the planet.

Photometry measurements made at the Oakley Observatory during 2006 produced a lightcurve with a rotation period of 12.06±0.03 h and an amplitude of 0.14±0.01 in magnitude. Subsequent observations at Organ Mesa Observatory in 2019 showed this period was not a good fit to a longer light curve. A period of 25.324±0.002 h was adopted; roughly double the original period. It has an estimated span of 112.59±2.8 km.
