= 134 Sophrosyne =

Main-belt asteroid

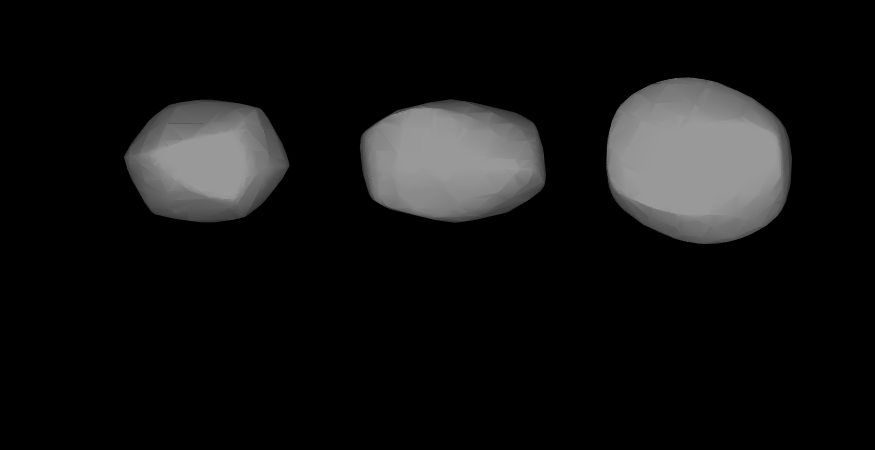
- Lightcurve-based 3D model of 134 Sophrosyne

Discovery
- Discovered by: Karl Theodor Robert Luther
- Discovery site: Düsseldorf, North Rhine-Westphalia, Germany
- Discovery date: 27 September 1873

Designations
- Pronunciation: /soʊˈfrɒsɪniː/
- Named after: sophrosyne
- Alternative designations: A873 SA (Note: The MPC notates Sophrosyne's retroactive new-style designation as 1873 SA.)
- Minor planet category: Main belt

Orbital characteristics
- Epoch 31 July 2016 (JD 2457600.5)
- Uncertainty parameter 0
- Observation arc: 138.60 yr (50625 d)
- Aphelion: 2.86280 AU (428.269 Gm)
- Perihelion: 2.26311 AU (338.556 Gm)
- Semi-major axis: 2.56295 AU (383.412 Gm)
- Eccentricity: 0.11699
- Orbital period (sidereal): 4.10 yr (1498.7 d)
- Average orbital speed: 18.54 km/s
- Mean anomaly: 229.885°
- Mean motion: 0° 14^{m} 24.76^{s} / day
- Inclination: 11.6018°
- Longitude of ascending node: 345.986°
- Argument of perihelion: 84.7156°
- Earth MOID: 1.31034 AU (196.024 Gm)
- Jupiter MOID: 2.42537 AU (362.830 Gm)
- T_{Jupiter}: 3.396

Physical characteristics
- Mean diameter: 107.02±9.63 km (composite estimate); 108 km 112.188 km
- Mass: (1.267 ± 0.575/0.398)×10^{18} kg (1.05±0.16)×10^{18} kg (Note: Calculated from its standard gravitational parameter GM = 0.070±0.011 km^{3}/s^{2}.)
- Mean density: 1.713 ± 0.778/0.538 g/cm^{3} 1.59 g/cm^{3} (Note: Assuming a diameter of 108 km.)
- Equatorial surface gravity: 0.029 m/s^{2}
- Equatorial escape velocity: 0.056 km/s
- Synodic rotation period: 17.190 h (0.7163 d)
- Geometric albedo: 0.0364±0.001; 0.0436 ± 0.0122
- Temperature: ~174 K
- Spectral type: C (Tholen)
- Absolute magnitude (H): 9.04, 8.770

134 Sophrosyne is a large main-belt asteroid that was discovered by German astronomer Robert Luther on 27 September 1873. It was named after the concept of sophrosyne, Plato's term for 'moderation'. Classified as a C-type asteroid, 134 Sophrosyne has an exceedingly dark surface and most probably a primitive carbonaceous composition.

This object is orbiting the Sun at a distance of 2.86 AU with an eccentricity of 0.12 and an orbital period of 4.10 years. The orbital plane is inclined at an angle of 11.6° to the plane of the ecliptic.

An occultation of a star by 134 Sophrosyne was observed 24 November 1980, in the United States. Timing information from this event allowed a diameter estimate of 110 km to be derived. This is similar to diameter estimates of 108 and 112 km, achieved by other techniques. Photometric observations of the asteroid in 2015 produced a lightcurve indicating a rotation period of 17.190±0.001 h with a variation amplitude of 0.28±0.01 in magnitude. This provided a good match to the only previous determination in 1989.
