= 37 Fides =

Main-belt asteroid

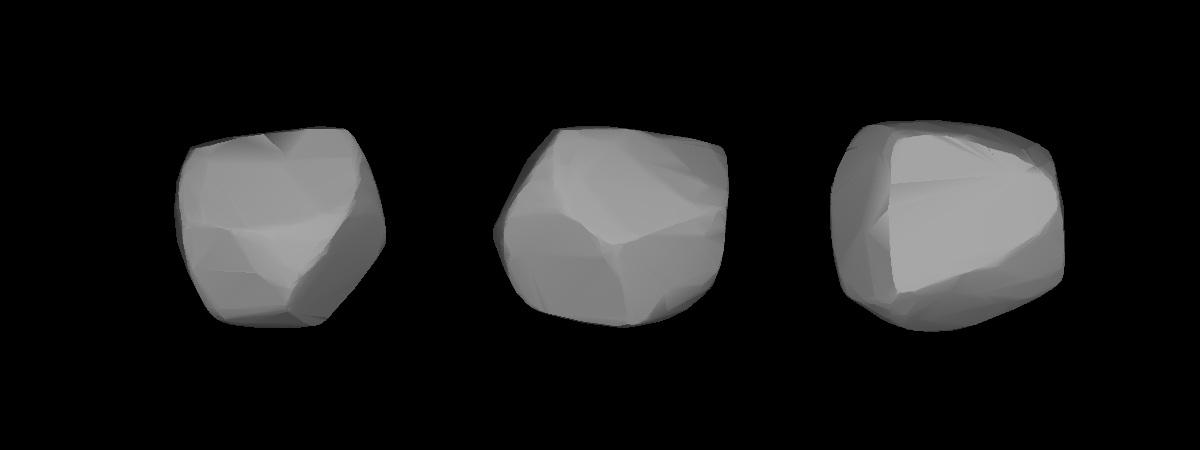
- A three-dimensional model of 37 Fides based on its lightcurve

Discovery
- Discovered by: R. Luther
- Discovery date: 5 October 1855

Designations
- Designation: (37) Fides
- Pronunciation: /ˈfaɪdiːz/
- Named after: Fides
- Alternative names: 1925 WH
- Minor planet category: Main belt
- Adjectives: Fidean /ˈfɪdiən/
- Symbol: (historical)

Orbital characteristics
- Epoch 25 February 2023 (JD 2460000.5)
- Observation arc: 167 yr
- Aphelion: 464.902 million km (3.108 AU)
- Perihelion: 325.937 million km (2.179 AU)
- Semi-major axis: 395.419 million km (2.643 AU)
- Eccentricity: 0.176
- Orbital period (sidereal): 1,569.628 d (4.30 a)
- Mean anomaly: 303.436°
- Mean motion: 0° 13^{m} 45.84^{s} / day
- Inclination: 3.071°
- Longitude of ascending node: 7.267°
- Time of perihelion: 15 February 2028
- Argument of perihelion: 62.327°

Physical characteristics
- Mean diameter: 118 ± 10 km
- Mass: (1.674 ± 0.663/0.314)×10^{18} kg (1.00±0.13)×10^{18} kg (Note: Calculated from its standard gravitational parameter GM = 0.067±0.009 km^{3}/s^{2}.)
- Mean density: 1.17–1.95 g/cm^{3} (calculated)
- Surface gravity: 0.019–0.032 m/s^{2}
- Escape velocity: 48–62 m/s
- Synodic rotation period: 7.332527 h (0.3055220 d)
- Pole ecliptic longitude: 270°
- Pole ecliptic latitude: 19°
- Albedo: 0.183 ± 0.007
- Temperature: ~167 K
- Spectral type: S
- Absolute magnitude (H): 7.41

37 Fides (/ˈfaɪdiːz/) is a large main-belt asteroid. It was discovered by German astronomer Karl Theodor Robert Luther on 5 October 1855, and named after Fides, the Roman goddess of loyalty. Fides was the last of the main-belt asteroids to be assigned an iconic symbol, a Latin cross. 37 Fides is also a S-type asteroid in the Tholen classification system.

Photometric observations of this asteroid at multiple observatories during 1981–82 gave an unusual light curve with three minima and maxima. The curve changed with varying phase angle of the asteroid relative to the viewer and the position of the Sun, indicating the changing influence of shadows cast by surface features. The composite light curve has a best fit period estimate of 7.33 hours. Austrian astronomer Hans Josef Schober has suggested that the multiple minima and maxima during each period may be an indication of a binary nature.
