= 82 Alkmene =

Main-belt asteroid

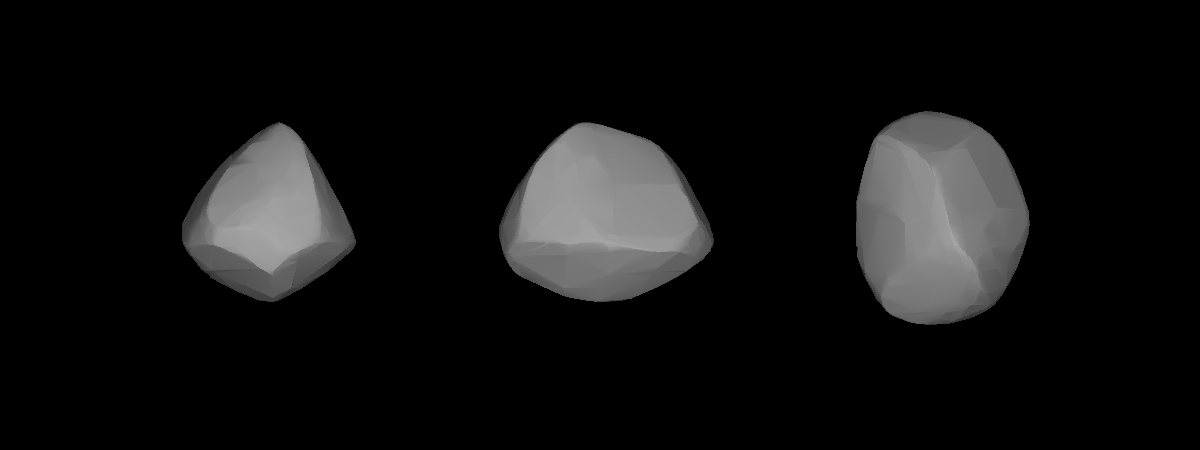
- A three-dimensional model of 82 Alkmene based on its lightcurve

Discovery
- Discovered by: Karl Theodor Robert Luther
- Discovery date: 27 November 1864

Designations
- Pronunciation: /ælkˈmiːniː/
- Named after: Alcmene
- Minor planet category: Main belt
- Adjectives: Alkmenean /ælkˈmiːniən/

Orbital characteristics
- Epoch 9 December 2014 (JD 2457000.5)
- Aphelion: 3.3701 AU
- Perihelion: 2.1609 AU
- Semi-major axis: 2.7655 AU
- Eccentricity: 0.2186
- Orbital period (sidereal): 4.60 yr
- Average orbital speed: 17.70 km/s
- Mean anomaly: 192.56°
- Inclination: 2.8286°
- Longitude of ascending node: 25.507°
- Argument of perihelion: 111.27°

Physical characteristics
- Dimensions: 61±1.5 km (IRAS)
- Mass: 2.4×10^{17} kg (assumed)
- Synodic rotation period: 12.999 h
- Geometric albedo: 0.208
- Spectral type: S
- Absolute magnitude (H): 8.40

82 Alkmene is a main-belt asteroid. Alkmene was discovered by R. Luther on 27 November 1864 and named after Alcmene, the mother of Herakles in Greek mythology. Based on IRAS data, Alkmene is estimated to be about 61 kilometres (38 mi) in diameter. The presence of a satellite around the asteroid has been suggested based on 1985 lightcurve data.

Asteroid Alkmene occulted the apparent magnitude 7.5 star HIP 99229 in the constellation of Capricornus on 18 September 2014 around 06:41 UT (17 September 23:41 PDT) and was centered on Sacramento, CA. Alkmene projected an eclipse shadow that moves at about 3.2 km/s (2 mi/s). Asteroid occultations allow for accurate 2-dimensional mapping of an asteroids silhouette when observed by multiple telescopes separated by about 10 km (6.2 mi).
