= 58 Concordia =

Main-belt asteroid

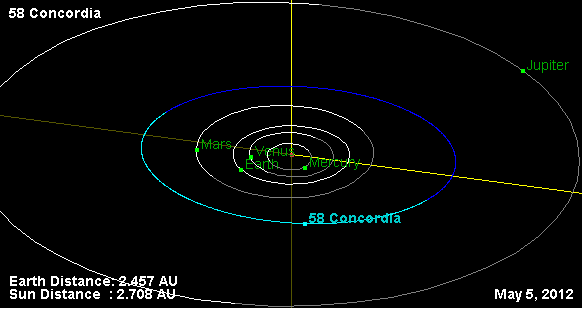
- Orbital diagram

Discovery
- Discovered by: Karl Theodor Robert Luther
- Discovery date: 24 March 1860

Designations
- Pronunciation: /kənˈkɔːrdiə/
- Named after: Concordia
- Minor planet category: Main belt Nemesis
- Adjectives: Concordian

Orbital characteristics
- Epoch 31 December 2006 (JD 2454100.5)
- Aphelion: 2.818 AU (421.526 million km)
- Perihelion: 2.583 AU (386.457 million km)
- Semi-major axis: 2.701 AU (403.991 million km)
- Eccentricity: 0.043
- Orbital period (sidereal): 4.44 a (1620.946 d)
- Mean anomaly: 15.122°
- Inclination: 5.057°
- Longitude of ascending node: 161.290°
- Argument of perihelion: 34.465°

Physical characteristics
- Mean diameter: 94.84±1.57 km (composite estimate)
- Mass: (5.8±2.7)×10^{17} kg (Note: Calculated from its standard gravitational parameter GM = 0.039±0.018 km^{3}/s^{2}.)
- Mean density: 0.93 g/cm^{3} (Note: Assuming a diameter of 107 km.)
- Synodic rotation period: 9.895±0.001 h
- Geometric albedo: 0.058
- Spectral type: C
- Absolute magnitude (H): 8.86

58 Concordia is a fairly large main-belt asteroid that is orbiting the Sun with a period of 4.44 years, a semimajor axis of 2.7 AU, and a low eccentricity of 0.043. It is classified as a C-type asteroid, meaning that its surface is very dark and it is likely carbonaceous in composition. The surface spectra displays indications of hydrated minerals created through aqueous alteration. The object is rotating with a sidereal period of 9.894541 h and pole orientations of (15.3°±0.7°, −4.2°±2.6°) and (195.9°±1.0°, 4.8°±1.2°). It belongs to the Nemesis family of asteroids.

Concordia was discovered by German astronomer Robert Luther on 24 March 1860. At Luther's request, it was named by Karl Christian Bruhns of the University of Leipzig after Concordia, the Roman goddess of harmony.
