= 118 Peitho =

Main-belt asteroid

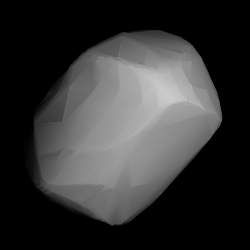
- 3D convex shape model of 118 Peitho

Discovery
- Discovered by: Karl Theodor Robert Luther
- Discovery date: 15 March 1872

Designations
- Pronunciation: /ˈpaɪθoʊ/
- Named after: Πειθώ Peithō
- Alternative designations: A872 EA
- Minor planet category: Main belt
- Adjectives: Peithoian /paɪˈθoʊ.iən/

Orbital characteristics
- Epoch 31 July 2016 (JD 2457600.5)
- Uncertainty parameter 0
- Observation arc: 144.05 yr (52615 d)
- Aphelion: 2.8353 AU (424.15 Gm)
- Perihelion: 2.03988 AU (305.162 Gm)
- Semi-major axis: 2.43757 AU (364.655 Gm)
- Eccentricity: 0.16315
- Orbital period (sidereal): 3.81 yr (1390.1 d)
- Average orbital speed: 18.95 km/s
- Mean anomaly: 51.1620°
- Mean motion: 0° 15^{m} 32.328^{s} / day
- Inclination: 7.7427°
- Longitude of ascending node: 47.701°
- Argument of perihelion: 33.403°
- Earth MOID: 1.05849 AU (158.348 Gm)
- Jupiter MOID: 2.4367 AU (364.53 Gm)
- T_{Jupiter}: 3.473

Physical characteristics
- Dimensions: 41.73±1.5 km
- Mass: 7.6×10^{16} kg
- Equatorial surface gravity: 0.0117 m/s^{2}
- Equatorial escape velocity: 0.0220 km/s
- Synodic rotation period: 7.8055 h (0.32523 d); 7.823 h
- Geometric albedo: 0.2240±0.017
- Temperature: ~178 K
- Spectral type: S
- Absolute magnitude (H): 9.14

118 Peitho is a main-belt asteroid. It is probably an S-type asteroid, suggesting a siliceous mineralogy. It was discovered by R. Luther on March 15, 1872, and named after one of the two Peithos in Greek mythology. There have been two observed Peithoan occultations of a dim star: one was in 2000 and the other in 2003.

This body is orbiting the Sun with a period of 3.81 years and an eccentricity (ovalness) of 0.16. The orbital plane is inclined by 7.7° to the plane of the ecliptic. The cross-section diameter is ~42 km. In 2009, Photometric observations of this asteroid were made at the Palmer Divide Observatory in Colorado Springs, Colorado. The resulting asymmetrical light curve shows a synodic rotation period of 7.823 ± 0.002 hours with a brightness variation of 0.15 ± 0.02 in magnitude. This was reasonably consistent with independent studies performed in 1980 (7.78 hours) and 2009 (7.8033 hours). The lightcurve inversion process has been used to construct a model of this object, suggesting a blocky shape with flattened poles.
