= 71 Niobe =

Main-belt asteroid

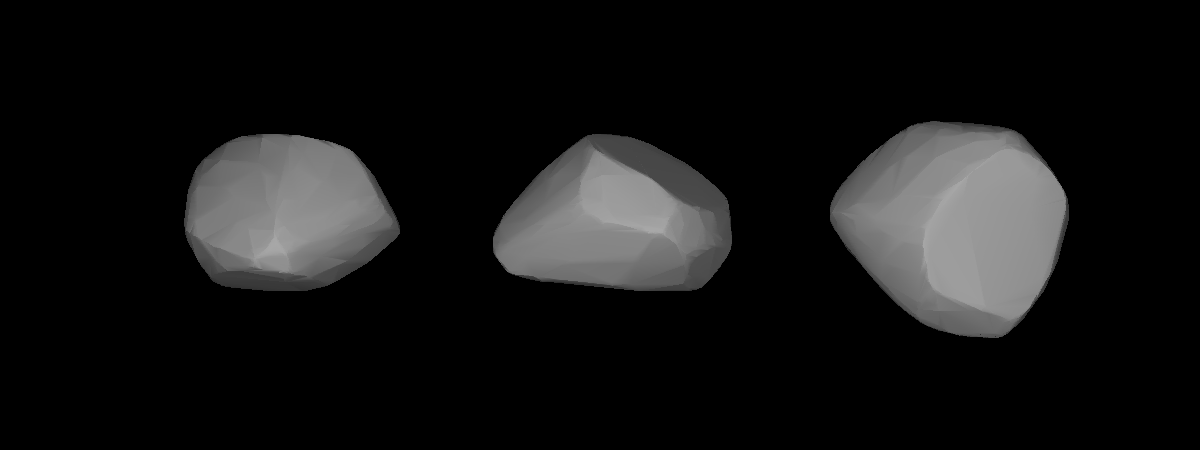
- Lightcurve-based 3D-model of Niobe

Discovery
- Discovered by: R. Luther
- Discovery site: Düsseldorf Obs.
- Discovery date: 13 August 1861

Designations
- Pronunciation: /ˈnaɪəbiː/
- Named after: Νιόβη Niobē (Greek mythology)
- Minor planet category: main-belt · (middle); Gallia
- Adjectives: Niobean /naɪəˈbiːən/

Orbital characteristics
- Epoch 23 March 2018 (JD 2458200.5)
- Uncertainty parameter 0
- Observation arc: 154.10 yr (56,286 d)
- Aphelion: 3.2348 AU
- Perihelion: 2.2790 AU
- Semi-major axis: 2.7569 AU
- Eccentricity: 0.1733
- Orbital period (sidereal): 4.58 yr (1,672 d)
- Mean anomaly: 178.02°
- Mean motion: 0° 12^{m} 55.08^{s} / day
- Inclination: 23.259°
- Longitude of ascending node: 316.02°
- Argument of perihelion: 266.88°

Physical characteristics
- Mean diameter: 75.87±3.28 km 80.86±0.80 km 83.42±1.7 km 92.75 km (taken); 92.753 km 92.842±0.644 km
- Mass: (9.0±9.0)×10^{17} kg (Note: Calculated from its standard gravitational parameter GM = 0.06±0.06 km^{3}/s^{2}.) (SB441)
- Mean density: 2.1–3.9 g/cm^{3} (calculated)
- Synodic rotation period: 11 h 11.21 h 14.34±0.05 h 14.34 h 14.38±0.02 h 35.5±0.1 h (Note: Lightcurve plot of 71 Niobe, Palmer Divide Observatory, B. D. Warner (2006): rotation period 35.5±0.1 hours with a brightness amplitude of 0.22±0.02 mag. Quality code of 2+. Summary figures at the LCDB); 35.617948 h 35.81±0.01 h 35.8521±0.0005 h 35.864±0.002 h
- Geometric albedo: 0.2446; 0.2475±0.0346; 0.3052±0.013; 0.326±0.008; 0.369±0.033
- Spectral type: Tholen = S SMASS = Xe · M · A · X B–V = 0.803; U–B = 0.439
- Absolute magnitude (H): 7.30; 7.31; 7.31±0.09

71 Niobe (Note: With the stress on the first syllable.) is a stony Gallia asteroid and relatively slow rotator from the central regions of the asteroid belt, approximately 90 kilometers (56 miles) in diameter. It was discovered by the German astronomer Robert Luther on 13 August 1861, and named after Niobe, a character in Greek mythology. In 1861, the brightness of this asteroid was shown to vary by astronomer Friedrich Tietjen.

== Description ==
Niobe is a member of the Gallia family (802), a small family of nearly 200 known stony asteroids.

In 2006, it was examined by radar using the Arecibo Observatory radio telescope in Puerto Rico. This was supplemented by optical observations intended to build a lightcurve. The resulting estimated rotation period of 35.6 hours, or 1.48 Earth days, superseded an earlier estimate of the rotation period as 14.3 hours. The radar data produced an estimate of a maximum equatorial diameter of 94 km, which is consistent with earlier estimates based upon infrared data if the shape is assumed to be slightly elongated.

The rotation period was further refined to 35.864 ± 0.001 hours during observations through 2010. Six stellar occultations of this asteroid between 2004 and 2007 produced chords ranging from 13 to 72 km (8.1 to 44.7 mi), which are statistically consistent with the published maximum diameter estimates.
