= 53 Kalypso =

Main-belt asteroid

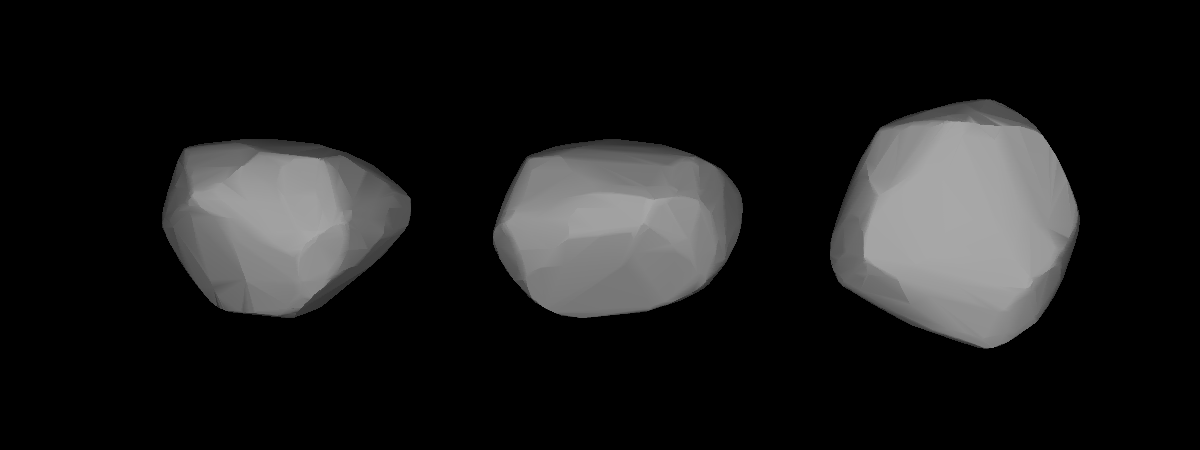
- Three-dimensional model of 53 Kalypso created based on its lightcurve

Discovery
- Discovered by: Karl Theodor Robert Luther
- Discovery date: 4 April 1858

Designations
- Pronunciation: /kəˈlɪpsoʊ/
- Named after: Calypso
- Minor planet category: Main belt
- Adjectives: Kalypsonian /kælɪpˈsoʊniən/ Kalypsoian /kælɪpˈsoʊ.iən/

Orbital characteristics
- Epoch 31 December 2006 (JD 2454100.5)
- Aphelion: 471.807 million km (3.154 AU)
- Perihelion: 311.998 million km (2.086 AU)
- Semi-major axis: 391.903 million km (2.620 AU)
- Eccentricity: 0.204
- Orbital period (sidereal): 1548.736 d (4.24 a)
- Mean anomaly: 98.113°
- Inclination: 5.153°
- Longitude of ascending node: 143.813°
- Argument of perihelion: 312.330°

Physical characteristics
- Dimensions: 115.4 km
- Mass: (1.294 ± 0.520/0.412)×10^{18} kg (6.1±1.9)×10^{17} kg (Note: Calculated from its standard gravitational parameter GM = 0.041±0.013 km^{3}/s^{2}.)
- Mean density: 1.625 ± 0.653/0.517 g/cm^{3} (Note: Assuming a diameter of 115 ± 10.324 km.); 1.28 g/cm^{3} (Note: Assuming a diameter of 97.3 km.)
- Synodic rotation period: 9.036 h
- Geometric albedo: 0.040
- Absolute magnitude (H): 8.81

53 Kalypso is a large and very dark main belt asteroid that was discovered by German astronomer Robert Luther on 4 April 1858, at Düsseldorf. It is named after Calypso, a sea nymph in Greek mythology, a name it shares with Calypso, a moon of Saturn.

The orbit of 53 Kalypso places it in a mean motion resonance with the planets Jupiter and Saturn. The computed Lyapunov time for this asteroid is 19,000 years, indicating that it occupies a chaotic orbit that will change randomly over time because of gravitational perturbations of the planets.

Photometric observations of this asteroid during 2005–06 gave a light curve with a period of 18.075 ± 0.005 hours and a brightness variation of 0.14 in magnitude. In 2009, a photometric study from a different viewing angle was performed at the Organ Mesa Observatory in Las Cruces, New Mexico, yielding a rotation period of 9.036 ± 0.001 with a brightness variation of 0.14 ± 0.02 magnitude. This is exactly half of the 2005–06 result. The author of the earlier study used additional data observation that favored the 9.036 hour period. The discrepancy was deemed a consequence of viewing the asteroid from different longitudes.

Kalypso has been studied by radar.
