= 68 Leto =

Main-belt asteroid

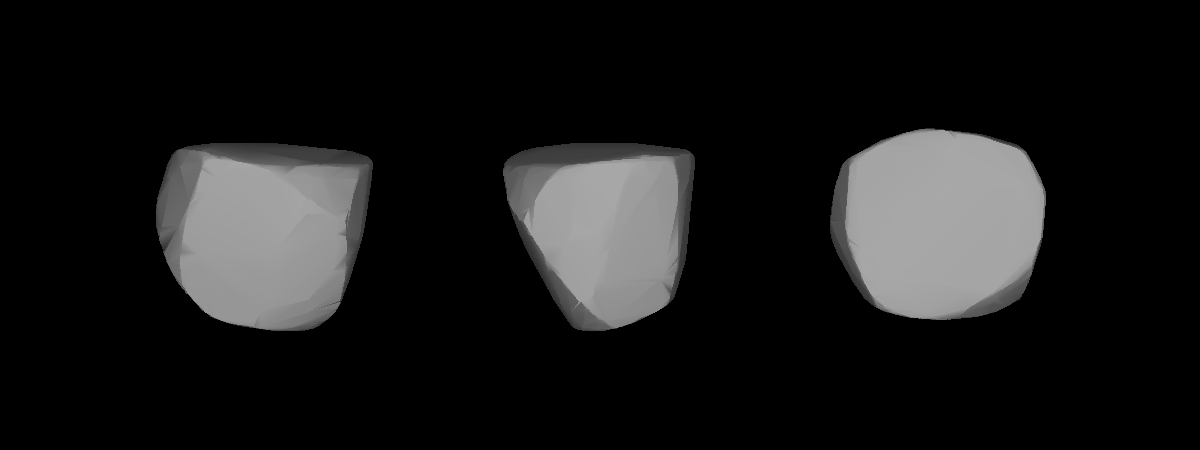
- A three-dimensional model of 68 Leto based on its lightcurve

Discovery
- Discovered by: Karl Theodor Robert Luther
- Discovery date: 29 April 1861

Designations
- Pronunciation: /ˈlɛtoʊ/
- Named after: Λητώ Lētō
- Minor planet category: Main belt
- Adjectives: Letoian /liːˈtoʊ.iən/

Orbital characteristics
- Epoch 31 July 2016 (JD 2457600.5)
- Uncertainty parameter 0
- Observation arc: 152.08 yr (55548 d)
- Aphelion: 3.30153 AU (493.902 Gm)
- Perihelion: 2.26072 AU (338.199 Gm)
- Semi-major axis: 2.78112 AU (416.050 Gm)
- Eccentricity: 0.18712
- Orbital period (sidereal): 4.64 yr (1,694.1 d)
- Mean anomaly: 48.7204°
- Mean motion: 0° 12^{m} 45.025^{s} / day
- Inclination: 7.97189°
- Longitude of ascending node: 44.1270°
- Argument of perihelion: 304.826°

Physical characteristics
- Mean diameter: 102.7+5.6 −0.3 km (thermophysical); 152.0+20.8 −18.3 km/132.8+8.4 −8.0 km (LCI + occ); 112 ± 14 km (LCI + img)
- Mass: (3.55±0.27)×10^{18} kg (Note: Calculated from its standard gravitational parameter GM = 0.237±0.018 km^{3}/s^{2}.)
- Mean density: 1.93–6.26 g/cm^{3} (calculated)
- Synodic rotation period: 14.845449+0.000004 −0.000003 h
- Pole ecliptic longitude: 103° 125°+8° −6° or 308°+4° −2°
- Pole ecliptic latitude: 43° 61°+7° −17° or 46°+4° −9°
- Geometric albedo: 0.295+0.001 −0.029; 0.228±0.028
- Spectral type: S
- Apparent magnitude: 9.56 (brightest)
- Absolute magnitude (H): 6.90

68 Leto is a large main belt asteroid that is orbiting the Sun. The asteroid was discovered by German astronomer Robert Luther on April 29, 1861, and is named after Leto, the mother of Apollo and Artemis in Greek mythology. It orbits at a distance of 2.78112 AU over 4.64 years and has an orbital eccentricity of 0.187. The orbital plane is inclined at an angle of 7.97° to the ecliptic.

Photometric observations of 68 Leto during 1997 provided a rotation period of 14.856 ± 0.024 h. It has an estimated cross-sectional size of 123 km. The spectral type is S, suggesting a stony, silicate composition.
