= 84 Klio =

Main-belt asteroid

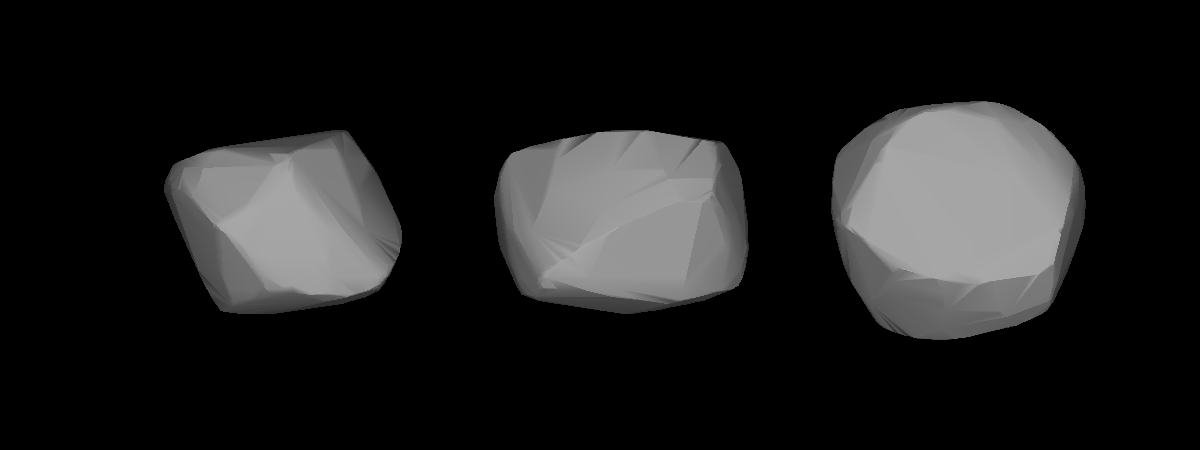
- A lightcurve-based 3D model of the asteroid

Discovery
- Discovered by: Karl Theodor Robert Luther
- Discovery date: 25 August 1865

Designations
- Pronunciation: /ˈklaɪ.oʊ/
- Named after: Clio
- Minor planet category: Main belt · Klio
- Adjectives: Klionian /klaɪˈoʊniən/ Klioian /klaɪˈoʊ.iən/

Orbital characteristics
- Epoch 9 June 2026 (JD 2461200.5)
- Uncertainty parameter 0
- Aphelion: 2.9198 AU
- Perihelion: 1.8068 AU
- Semi-major axis: 2.3633 AU
- Eccentricity: 0.2355
- Orbital period (sidereal): 1327.01 d (3.6332 yr)
- Mean anomaly: 93.074°
- Inclination: 9.3143°
- Longitude of ascending node: 327.486°
- Argument of perihelion: 15.191°
- T_{Jupiter}: 3.494

Physical characteristics
- Mean diameter: 78.76±1.12 km (composite estimate); 79.16 ± 1.6 km
- Mass: (3.93 ± 1.48/1.28)×10^{17} kg (6.6±2.5)×10^{17} kg (Note: Calculated from its standard gravitational parameter GM = 0.044±0.017 km^{3}/s^{2}.)
- Mean density: 1.521 ± 0.572/0.497 g/cm^{3} (Note: Assuming a diameter of 79 ± 4.867 km.); 2.53 g/cm^{3} (Note: Assuming a diameter of 79.2 km.)
- Synodic rotation period: 23.562 ± 0.001 h
- Geometric albedo: 0.053
- Spectral type: G
- Absolute magnitude (H): 9.36

84 Klio is a fairly large and very dark main-belt asteroid. It was discovered by R. Luther on 25 August 1865, and named after Clio, the Muse of history in Greek mythology. The name Clio had previously been suggested by the discoverer of 12 Victoria, and that is the name B. A. Gould, editor of the prestigious Astronomical Journal, adopted for that asteroid, because of the controversy over the name Victoria. An occultation by Klio over a dim star was observed on 2 April 1997.

Photometric observations of this asteroid during 2007 at the Organ Mesa Observatory in Las Cruces, New Mexico were used to create a light curve plot. This showed a synodic rotation period of 23.562 ± 0.001 hours and a brightness variation of 0.21 ± 0.02 magnitude during each cycle.

== Perturbation ==
Perturbations of asteroid 52 Europa by 84 Klio suggest that 52 Europa would have a mass as high as 1.68×10^{20} kg. (Note: High estimate for mass of asteroid Europa 0.851 / Mass of Ceres 4.75) * Mass of Ceres 9.43E+20 = 1.689E+20) But this would require Europa to have an unrealistic density of 10.6 g/cm^{3}. Further observations of Klio will be needed to properly refine the mass of both asteroids, Europa and Klio.
