= 28 Bellona =

Main-belt asteroid

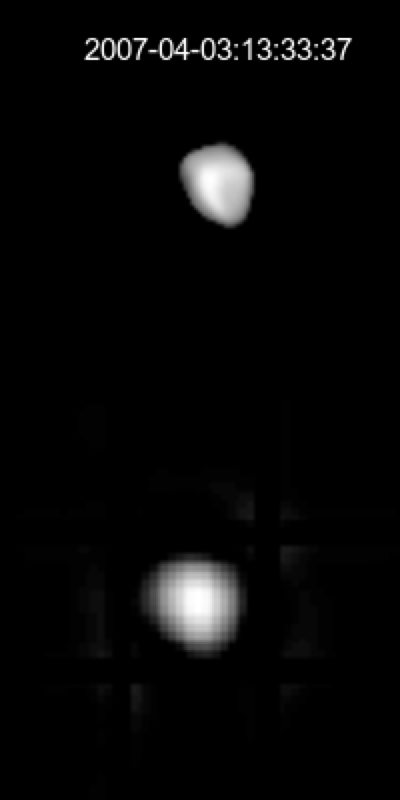
- A light curve model of 28 Bellona on the top and an image of 28 Bellona on the bottom.

Discovery
- Discovered by: Robert Luther
- Discovery date: 1 March 1854

Designations
- Pronunciation: /bɛˈloʊnə/
- Named after: Bellona
- Alternative designations: 1951 CC_{2}
- Minor planet category: Main belt
- Adjectives: Bellonian /bɛˈloʊniən/
- Symbol: (historical)

Orbital characteristics
- Epoch 21 November 2025 (JD 2461000.5)
- Aphelion: 3.191 AU
- Perihelion: 2.364 AU
- Semi-major axis: 2.777 AU
- Eccentricity: 0.149
- Orbital period (sidereal): 4.628 yr (1690.55 d)
- Mean anomaly: 65.459°
- Inclination: 9.432°
- Longitude of ascending node: 144.151°
- Argument of perihelion: 343.462°
- Jupiter MOID: 1.872 AU
- T_{Jupiter}: 3.299

Physical characteristics
- Dimensions: 135 ± 7 km (ADAM)
- Mass: (2.62±0.15)×10^{18} kg (composite estimate) (1.57±0.31)×10^{18} kg (Note: Calculated from its standard gravitational parameter GM = 0.105±0.021 km^{3}/s^{2}.)
- Mean density: 2.0 ± 0.3 g/cm^{3} 1.22±0.31 g/cm^{3}
- Synodic rotation period: 15.70785 h
- Pole ecliptic longitude: 99° ± 4°
- Pole ecliptic latitude: −16° ± 6°
- Geometric albedo: 0.1763
- Spectral type: S
- Absolute magnitude (H): 7.09

28 Bellona is a large asteroid located in the main-belt. It was discovered by German astronomer Robert Luther on 1 March 1854, and named after Bellōna, the Roman goddess of war; the name was chosen to mark the beginning of the Crimean War. Its historical symbol was Bellona's whip and spear; it was encoded in Unicode 17.0 as U+1CECE 𜻎.

Bellona is a stony (S-type) asteroid with a cross-section size of around 135 km. 28 Bellona is orbiting the Sun with a period of 4.63 years.

Bellona has been studied by radar. Photometric observations of this asteroid at the Palmer Divide Observatory in Colorado Springs, Colorado in 2007 gave a light curve with a period of 15.707 ± 0.002 hours and a brightness variation of 0.27 ± 0.03 in magnitude. This report is in close agreement with a period estimate of 15.695 hours reported in 1983, and rejects a longer period of 16.523 hours reported in 1979.

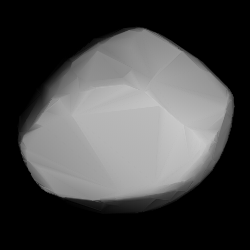
A three-dimensional model of 28 Bellona based on its light curve
