= 471 Papagena =

Main-belt asteroid

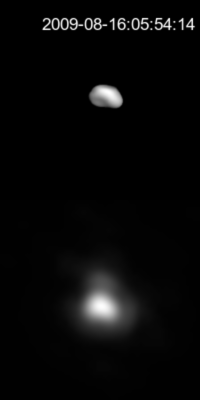
- A three-dimensional model of 471 Papagena on the top and an image of 471 Papagena on the bottom.

Discovery
- Discovered by: Max Wolf
- Discovery date: 7 June 1901

Designations
- Pronunciation: German: [paːpaˈɡeːna]
- Alternative designations: 1901 GN
- Minor planet category: Main belt

Orbital characteristics
- Epoch 31 July 2016 (JD 2457600.5)
- Uncertainty parameter 0
- Observation arc: 114.84 yr (41944 d)
- Aphelion: 3.5566 AU (532.06 Gm) (Q)
- Perihelion: 2.2193 AU (332.00 Gm) (q)
- Semi-major axis: 2.8879 AU (432.02 Gm) (a)
- Eccentricity: 0.23154 (e)
- Orbital period (sidereal): 4.91 yr (1792.6 d)
- Mean anomaly: 46.684° (M)
- Mean motion: 0° 12^{m} 2.988^{s} / day (n)
- Inclination: 14.976° (i)
- Longitude of ascending node: 83.999° (Ω)
- Argument of perihelion: 314.13° (ω)

Physical characteristics
- Mean diameter: 132 ± 4 km (AO)
- Mass: (3.15±0.21)×10^{18} kg (2025) (Note: Calculated from its standard gravitational parameter GM = 0.210±0.014 km^{3}/s^{2}.) (3.49±1.30)×10^{18} kg (2023)
- Mean density: 2.61±0.29 g/cm^{3} (2025); 2.70±1.08 g/cm^{3} (2023) (Note: Assuming a diameter of 135.1 ± 6.3 km.)
- Synodic rotation period: 7.115390 h (0.2964746 d)
- Pole ecliptic longitude: 221° ± 5°
- Pole ecliptic latitude: 62° ± 8°
- Geometric albedo: 0.164±0.020
- Spectral type: S
- Apparent magnitude: 9.27 to 13.13
- Absolute magnitude (H): 6.72; 6.32
- Angular diameter: 0.147" to 0.041"

471 Papagena is an asteroid that was discovered by German astronomer Max Wolf on 7 June 1901. Its provisional name was 1901 GN.

Papagena comes to a favorable near-opposition apparent magnitude of better than magnitude 9.8 every five years. On 30 September 2010, it was magnitude 9.68 and it will get brighter every five years until 12 December 2035, when this late-to-be-discovered asteroid will be at magnitude 9.28. It is named for a character in Mozart's opera, The Magic Flute.
