= 247 Eukrate =

Main-belt asteroid

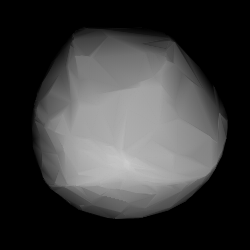
- 3D model based on lightcurve data

Discovery
- Discovered by: Robert Luther
- Discovery date: 14 March 1885

Designations
- Pronunciation: /juːˈkreɪtiː/ (Note: A rare case of a long alpha in Greek, eukrātē, so the stress is on the 'a'. Cf. "eucratic". Oxford English Dictionary (online ed.). Oxford University Press. (Subscription or participating institution membership required.))
- Named after: Eucrate
- Alternative designations: A885 EB, 1901 TB; 1947 TA, 1960 TC
- Minor planet category: Main belt

Orbital characteristics
- Epoch 31 July 2016 (JD 2457600.5)
- Uncertainty parameter 0
- Observation arc: 131.09 yr (47880 d)
- Aphelion: 3.4086 AU (509.92 Gm)
- Perihelion: 2.0778 AU (310.83 Gm)
- Semi-major axis: 2.7432 AU (410.38 Gm)
- Eccentricity: 0.24257
- Orbital period (sidereal): 4.54 yr (1659.5 d)
- Average orbital speed: 18.0 km/s
- Mean anomaly: 75.9892°
- Mean motion: 0° 13^{m} 0.948^{s} / day
- Inclination: 24.991°
- Longitude of ascending node: 0.16410°
- Argument of perihelion: 54.969°

Physical characteristics
- Mean diameter: 130.935±0.505 km
- Surface area: 61580 km^{2} (Note: Surface area derived from the surface area equivalent diameter d: $\pi d^{2}$, where d = 140.0 km.)
- Volume: 1.361×10^{6} km^{3} (Note: Volume derived from the volume equivalent diameter d: $\frac{\pi}{6}d^{3}$, where d = 137.5 km.)
- Mass: (1.99 ± 0.830/0.62)×10^{18} kg (3.66±0.66)×10^{18} kg (Note: Calculated from its standard gravitational parameter GM = 0.244±0.044 km^{3}/s^{2}.)
- Mean density: 1.693 ± 0.706/0.527 g/cm^{3} (Note: Assuming a diameter of 130.935 ± 0.505 km.); 3.11 g/cm^{3}
- Synodic rotation period: 12.093 h (0.5039 d)
- Geometric albedo: 0.064±0.012
- Spectral type: CP
- Absolute magnitude (H): 8.20

247 Eukrate is a rather large main-belt asteroid. It is dark and probably a primitive carbonaceous body. The asteroid was discovered by Robert Luther on March 14, 1885, in Düsseldorf. It was named after Eucrate, a Nereid in Greek mythology.

In 2001, the asteroid was detected by radar from the Arecibo Observatory at a distance of 1.18 AU. The resulting data yielded an effective diameter of 134 ± 15 km.

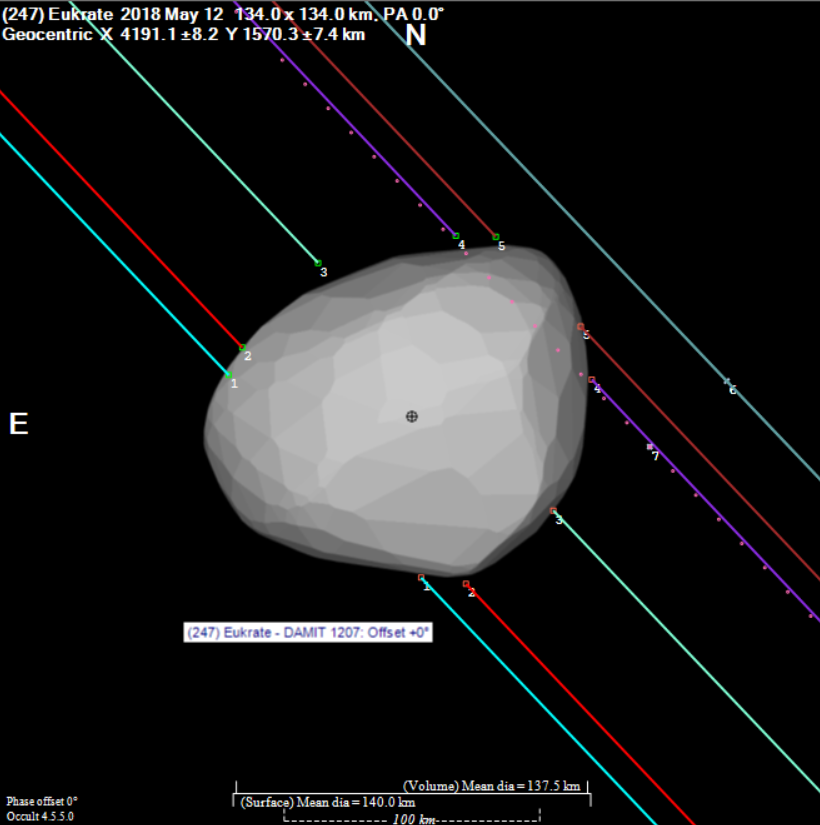
An Occult (Software) plot of 5 Occultation chords (and a miss) with DAMIT Inversion model at event time.

There have been 9 occultation observations of this asteroid since 2004. The latest of 2018 May 12 was a 5 chord observation that allows, using Occult (Software), the scaling of the DAMIT model 1207, to yield a mean volume-equivalent diameter of 137.5 km and a mean surface-equivalent diameter of 140.0 km.
