= 325 Heidelberga =

Main-belt asteroid

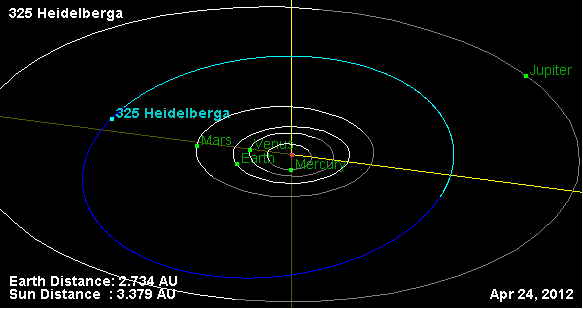
- Orbital diagram

Discovery
- Discovered by: Max Wolf
- Discovery date: 4 March 1892

Designations
- Pronunciation: /ˌhaɪdəlˈbɜːrɡə/
- Named after: Heidelberg
- Minor planet category: Main belt
- Adjectives: Heidelergian /ˌhaɪdəlˈbɜːrdʒiən, -ɡiən/

Orbital characteristics
- Epoch 31 July 2016 (JD 2457600.5)
- Uncertainty parameter 0
- Observation arc: 117.86 yr (43050 d)
- Aphelion: 3.7223 AU (556.85 Gm)
- Perihelion: 2.69998 AU (403.911 Gm)
- Semi-major axis: 3.21115 AU (480.381 Gm)
- Eccentricity: 0.15919
- Orbital period (sidereal): 5.75 yr (2101.8 d)
- Mean anomaly: 7.2090°
- Mean motion: 0° 10^{m} 16.608^{s} / day
- Inclination: 8.5545°
- Longitude of ascending node: 344.881°
- Argument of perihelion: 68.563°

Physical characteristics
- Dimensions: 75.72±1.7 km
- Mass: (1.48±0.49)×10^{18} kg (Note: Calculated from its standard gravitational parameter GM = 0.099±0.033 km^{3}/s^{2}.)
- Mean density: 6.53 g/cm^{3}
- Synodic rotation period: 6.737 h (0.2807 d)
- Geometric albedo: 0.1068±0.005
- Absolute magnitude (H): 8.65

325 Heidelberga is a large main belt asteroid that was discovered by German astronomer Max Wolf on 4 March 1892 in Heidelberg. It is orbiting the Sun at a distance of 3.21 AU with an eccentricity (oval shape) of 0.159. The orbital plane is inclined at an angle of 8.55° to the ecliptic.

Based upon its spectrum, 325 Heidelberga is classified as an M-type asteroid. No absorption features have been detected with certainty, indicating it most likely has a nickel-iron or enstatite chondrite composition. A weak feature in the near infrared spectrum indicates the presence of low-iron orthopyroxene on the asteroid surface.
