= Luther (crater) =

Crater on the Moon

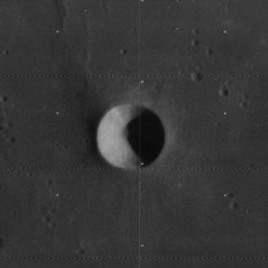
- Lunar Orbiter 4 image
- Coordinates: 33.2°N 24.1°E
- Diameter: 10 km
- Depth: 1.9 km
- Colongitude: 336° at sunrise
- Eponym: Robert Luther

Luther is a small lunar impact crater on the northwest part of Mare Serenitatis, at the inlet to Lacus Somniorum. To the east-southeast is the large crater Posidonius. Luther has a circular rim and is cup-shaped, with no appreciable wear from impact erosion. It lies across a wrinkle ridge on the lunar mare.

The crater is named after German astronomer Robert Luther.

== Satellite craters ==
By convention these features are identified on lunar maps by placing the letter on the side of the crater midpoint that is closest to Luther.

Luther	Latitude	Longitude	Diameter
H	36.0° N	22.8° E	7 km
K	37.5° N	23.3° E	4 km
X	36.1° N	24.3° E	4 km
Y	38.1° N	24.4° E	4 km
