= 78 Diana =

Main-belt asteroid

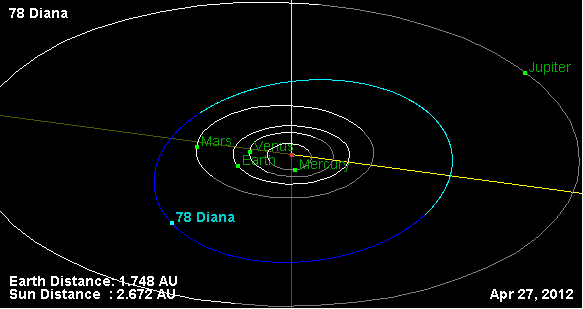
- Orbital diagram

Discovery
- Discovered by: Karl Theodor Robert Luther
- Discovery date: 15 March 1863

Designations
- Pronunciation: /daɪˈænə, daɪˈeɪnə/ dy-A(Y)N-ə
- Named after: Diāna (Roman mythology)
- Minor planet category: Main belt
- Adjectives: Dianian (/daɪˈeɪniən/ dy-AY-nee-ən)

Orbital characteristics
- Epoch 9 June 2026 (JD 2461200.5)
- Uncertainty parameter 0
- Aphelion: 3.1563 AU
- Perihelion: 2.0888 AU
- Semi-major axis: 2.6225 AU
- Eccentricity: 0.2035
- Orbital period (sidereal): 1551.26 d (4.2471 yr)
- Average orbital speed: 18.20 km/s
- Mean anomaly: 201.425°
- Inclination: 8.6795°
- Longitude of ascending node: 333.284°
- Argument of perihelion: 153.319°
- T_{Jupiter}: 3.358

Physical characteristics
- Mean diameter: 125.33±4.77 km (composite estimate)
- Mass: (1.36±0.40)×10^{18} kg (Note: Calculated from its standard gravitational parameter GM = 0.091±0.027 km^{3}/s^{2}.)
- Mean density: 1.49 g/cm^{3} (Note: Assuming a diameter of 121 km.)
- Synodic rotation period: 7.2991 h
- Geometric albedo: 0.071
- Spectral type: C
- Absolute magnitude (H): 8.09

78 Diana is a large and dark main-belt asteroid. It was discovered by German astronomer Robert Luther on 15 March 1863, and named after Diana, Roman goddess of the hunt. The asteroid is orbiting the Sun at a distance of 2.620 AU with a period of 4.24 years and an eccentricity (ovalness) of 0.207. The orbital plane is tilted at an angle of 8.688° relative to the plane of the ecliptic. Its composition is carbonaceous and primitive.

Photometric observations of this asteroid during 1986 and 2006–08 gave a light curve with a rotation period of 7.2991 hours and a brightness variation in the range 0.02–0.104 magnitude. Based upon radar data, the near surface solid density of the asteroid is 2.7^{+0.8}_{−0.5} g cm^{−3}. 78 Diana occulted a star on 4 September 1980. A diameter of 116 km was measured, closely matching the value given by the IRAS satellite.

Diana is expected to pass about 0.003 AU (450,000 km; 280,000 mi) from (29075) 1950 DA on 5 August 2150. Main-belt asteroid 4217 Engelhardt (~9 km in diameter) will pass about 0.0017 AU (250,000 km; 160,000 mi) from (29075) 1950 DA in 2736.
