= 288 Glauke =

Main-belt asteroid

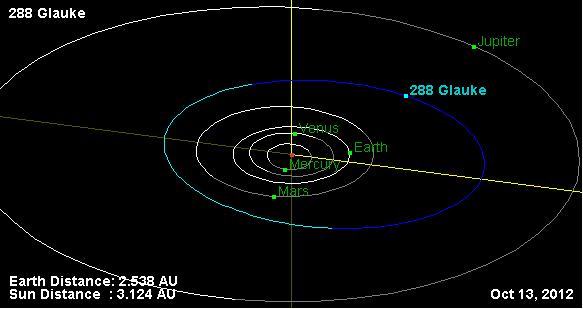
- Orbital diagram

Discovery
- Discovered by: Robert Luther
- Discovery site: Düsseldorf-Bilk Obs.
- Discovery date: 20 February 1890

Designations
- Pronunciation: /ˈɡlɔːkiː/
- Named after: Creusa (a.k.a. Glauce or Glauke)
- Alternative designations: A890 DA, 1955 MO; 1959 GB, 1961 WF
- Minor planet category: Main belt

Orbital characteristics
- Epoch 31 July 2016 (JD 2457600.5)
- Uncertainty parameter 0
- Observation arc: 124.34 yr (45416 d)
- Aphelion: 3.32685 AU (497.690 Gm)
- Perihelion: 2.19625 AU (328.554 Gm)
- Semi-major axis: 2.76155 AU (413.122 Gm)
- Eccentricity: 0.20470
- Orbital period (sidereal): 4.59 yr (1676.2 d)
- Mean anomaly: 176.219°
- Mean motion: 0° 12^{m} 53.172^{s} / day
- Inclination: 4.33517°
- Longitude of ascending node: 120.135°
- Argument of perihelion: 84.8286°

Physical characteristics
- Dimensions: 32.21±2.2 km (IRAS)
- Synodic rotation period: 1,170 h (49 d)
- Geometric albedo: 0.1973±0.029
- Spectral type: S
- Absolute magnitude (H): 9.84

288 Glauke is a stony, tumbling asteroid and slow rotator from the intermediate asteroid belt, approximately 32 kilometers in diameter. It was discovered on 20 February 1890, by Robert Luther at Düsseldorf-Bilk Observatory in Germany. This was the last of his asteroid discoveries. It is named after Creusa (known as Glauce or Glauke), a daughter of Creon, a king of Corinth in Greek mythology.

This body is orbiting the Sun at a distance of 2.76 AU with a moderate eccentricity of 0.20 and an orbital period of 4.59 years. Its orbital plane is inclined at an angle of 4.3° relative to the plane of the ecliptic. It is a common, stony S-type asteroid in both the Tholen and SMASS classification. Based on infrared observations, it has a diameter of 29 km.

Glauke has an exceptionally slow rotation period of about 1200 hours (50 days). This makes it one of the slowest-rotating asteroids in the Solar System. The rotation is believed to be "tumbling", similar to the near-Earth asteroid 4179 Toutatis.
