= 90 Antiope =

Double asteroid system in the outer asteroid belt

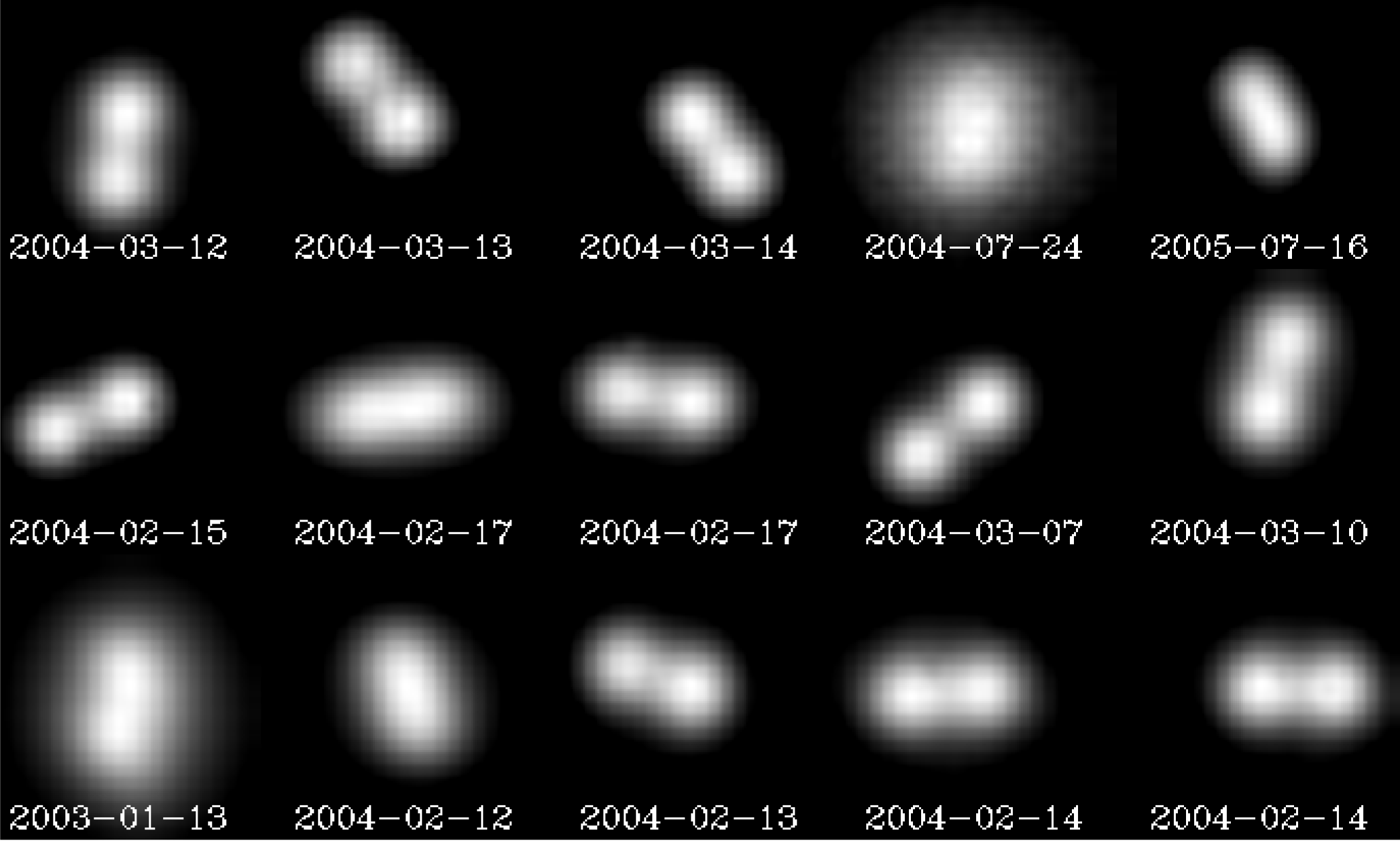
- VLT observations of the double asteroid 90 Antiope during 2004

Discovery
- Discovered by: Robert Luther
- Discovery date: 1 October 1866

Designations
- Pronunciation: /ænˈtaɪəpiː/
- Alternative designations: 1952 BK_{2}
- Minor planet category: Main belt (Themis family)
- Adjectives: Antiopean

Orbital characteristics
- Epoch 9 June 2026 (JD 2461200.5)
- Uncertainty parameter 0
- Aphelion: 3.6832 AU
- Perihelion: 2.5981 AU
- Semi-major axis: 3.1407 AU
- Eccentricity: 0.17275
- Orbital period (sidereal): 2032.7 d (5.57 yr)
- Average orbital speed: 16.66 km/s
- Mean anomaly: 244.530°
- Inclination: 2.2054°
- Longitude of ascending node: 69.886°
- Argument of perihelion: 244.379°
- T_{Jupiter}: 3.186

Physical characteristics
- Dimensions: 46.4 × 41.9 × 35.4 km 47.0 × 42.7 × 34.7 km (components)
- Mean radius: 40.4 ± 0.9 km/40.2 ± 0.9 km (components)
- Volume: 275188 km^{3}/270966 km^{3} (components)
- Mass: (9.14±0.62)×10^{17} kg (whole system); 4.60×10^{17} kg/4.53×10^{17} kg (components) (Note: The densities of both components have been assumed to be equal.)
- Mean density: 1.67 ± 0.23 g/cm^{3}
- Synodic rotation period: 16.505046±0.000005 h (doubly synchronous)
- Axial tilt: 53° ± 2°
- Pole ecliptic longitude: 199° ± 5°
- Pole ecliptic latitude: 38° ± 5°
- Geometric albedo: 0.058 ± 0.004
- Spectral type: C
- Absolute magnitude (H): 8.42 (together); 9.02 (each component)

90 Antiope is a double asteroid in the outer asteroid belt. It was discovered on 1 October 1866, by Robert Luther. In 2000, it was found to consist of two almost-equally-sized bodies orbiting each other, the first doubly synchronous system among asteroids. At average diameters of about 81 km and 80 km, both components are among the 500 largest asteroids. Antiope is a member of the Themis family of asteroids that share similar orbital elements.

== Naming ==
The asteroid's proper name comes from Greek mythology, but it is unclear whether it refers to Antiope the Amazon or Antiope the mother of Amphion and Zethus.

Since the discovery of Antiope's binary nature, the name "Antiope" technically refers to the slightly larger of the two components. The smaller component is sometimes referred to under the (unofficial) designation S/2000 (90) 1. However, the name "Antiope" is often used to refer to the binary system as a whole.

== Properties ==
The most remarkable feature of Antiope is that it consists of two components of almost equal size (the difference in mass is less than 2%), making it a truly "double" asteroid. Its binary nature was discovered on 10 August 2000 by a group of astronomers using adaptive optics at the Keck Telescope on Mauna Kea. Before this, IRAS observations had suggested that the asteroid was 120 km in diameter.

=== Orbital ===
Antiope orbits in the outer third of the core region of the asteroid belt, and is a member of the Themis family.

Since each component is about 80 km across, with their centers separated by only about 176 kilometers, the gap separating the two halves is about the same as the diameter of each component. As a result, the two bodies orbit around the common center of mass which lies in the space between them. The orbital period is approximately 16.50 hours, and the eccentricity below 0.006. Every several years, a period of mutual occultations occurs when the asteroid is viewed from Earth. Using Kepler's third law, the mass and density of the components can be derived from the orbital period and component sizes.

The axis of the mutual orbit of the two components points towards ecliptic coordinates (β, λ) = (200°, 38°) with 2 degrees uncertainty. This is tilted about 63° to the circumsolar orbit of the system.

Orbital elements of 90 Antiope components
Discovered	Semi-major axis (Note: More specifically, this is the separation between the centers of the two components.)	Orbital period	Eccentricity	Inclination	Ascending node	Periapsis argument
10 August 2000 (Note: The binary nature of 90 Antiope was discovered by W. J. Merline, L. M. Close, J. C. Shelton, C. Dumas, F. Menard, C. R. Chapman, and D. C. Slater.)	176 ± 4 km	16.505046±0.000005 h	<0.006	63.7° ± 2°	303.1° ± 2°	60° ± 30°

=== Physical ===
Antiope itself has an average diameter of about 88 km, while its companion has an average diameter of 84 km. Like most bodies in this region, the components of the Antiope system are of the dark C spectral type, indicating a carbonaceous composition. The low density (1.3±0.2 g/cm^{3}) of its components (see below) suggests a significant porosity (>30%), indicating rubble-pile asteroids composed of debris that accumulated in the aftermath of a previous asteroid collision, possibly the one that formed the Themis family.

Complementary observations using adaptive optic observations on 8–10 m class telescopes and mutual events photometric lightcurve over several months have served as input quantities for a derivation of a whole set of other physical parameters (shapes of the components, surface scattering, bulk density, and internal properties). The shape model is consistent with slightly non-spherical components, having a size ratio of 0.95 (with an average radius of 42.9 km), and exhibiting equilibrium figures for homogeneous rotating bodies. A comparison with grazing occultation event lightcurves taken in 2003 suggests that the real shape of the components do not depart much from Roche equilibrium figures (by more than 10%).

Observations from the VLT-UT4 telescope equipped with an adaptive optics system in 2007 and lightcurve data analysis suggest that one of the components appears to have a 68 km bowl-shaped impact crater that may be the result of a violent collision that broke proto-Antiope into two equisized bodies. The impactor is calculated to have been more than 17 km in diameter. The crater can not be resolved using the W.M. Keck II telescope.

The two parts of Antiope have very similar spectra. This implies they may have a common origin, such as being formed from the breakup of a larger rubble-pile asteroid, but other formation scenarios cannot be ruled out.

== Occultations ==
There have been 9 occultations observed since 1988, many of which are multichord occultations.

The best is the 19 July 2011 event observed from 57 stations spread out along the western USA coast where 46 stations recorded positive occultations and 11 stations observed misses. However many of the misses were important to clearly separate the two components of 90 Antiope. Many planned stations were unfortunately clouded. Many stations were so-called Mighty-Mini or Mighty-Maxi, consisting of a binocular objective (homemade using binoculars + hacksaw + plumbing fittings) with a video camera and Video Time Inserter (VTI), and were pre-pointed and left to run unattended, thereby allowing one observer to deploy many stations.

A video of the 2011 occultation, lasting about 20 seconds

The crater mentioned above was confirmed by this occultation.

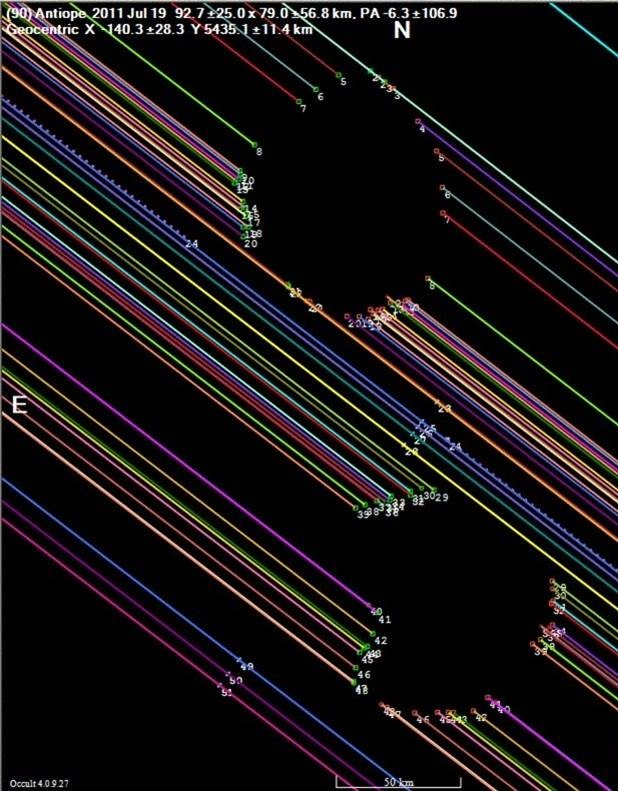
90 Antiope occulted the star LQ Aquarii on July 19, 2011, in western USA. 46 stations observed a positive, 11 stations observed a miss and others were clouded out. Many stations were pre-pointed and left unattended.
