= 17 Thetis =

Main-belt asteroid

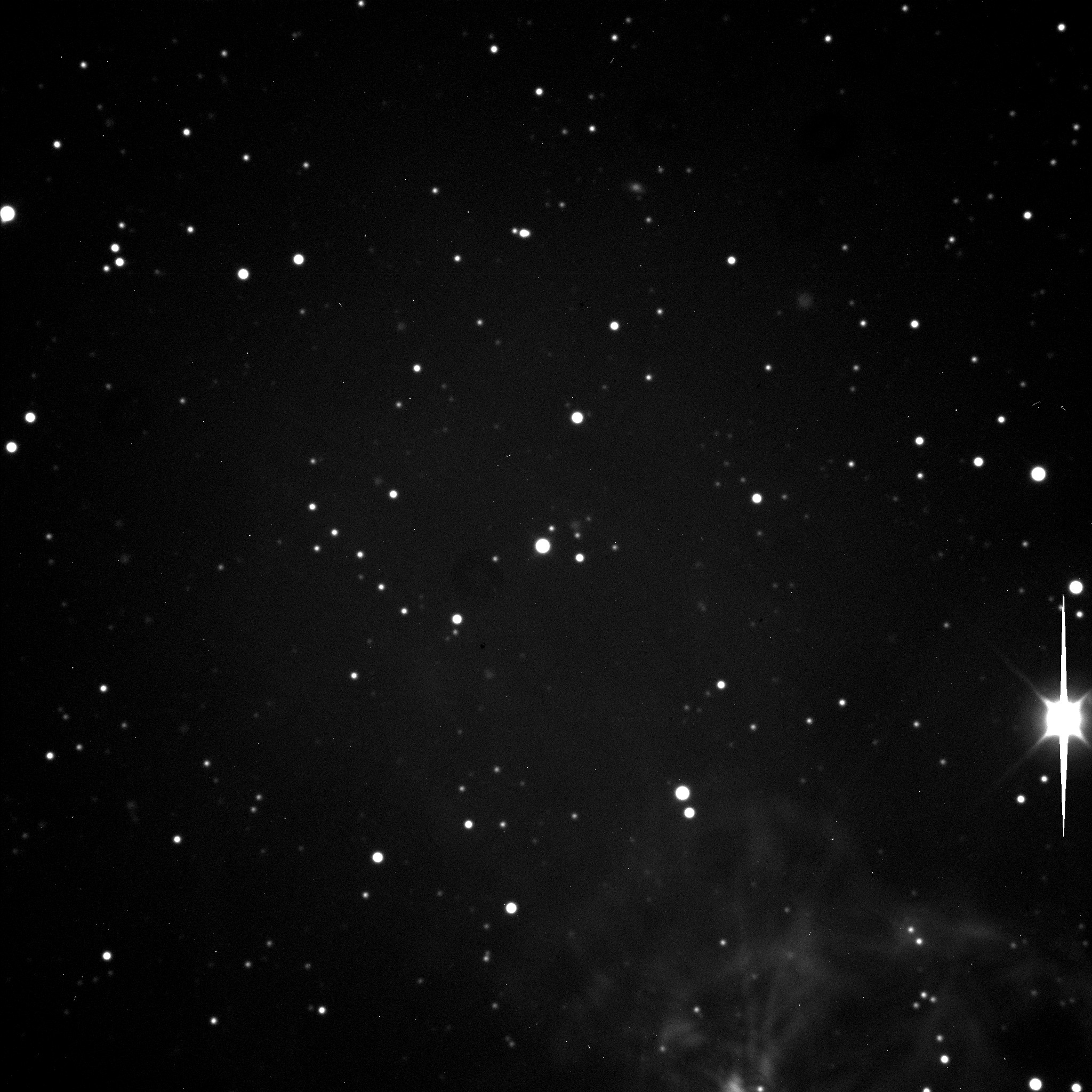
- Star field showing asteroid Thetis in the center

Discovery
- Discovered by: R. Luther
- Discovery site: Düsseldorf-Bilk Obs.
- Discovery date: 17 April 1852

Designations
- Pronunciation: /ˈθiːtɪs/
- Named after: Thetis (Greek mythology)
- Alternative designations: 1954 SO_{1} · A913 CA; A916 YF
- Minor planet category: main-belt · (inner)
- Adjectives: Thetidian /θɛˈtɪdiən/
- Symbol: (historical)

Orbital characteristics
- Epoch 16 February 2017 (JD 2457800.5)
- Uncertainty parameter 0
- Observation arc: 164.55 yr (60,102 days)
- Aphelion: 2.7987 AU
- Perihelion: 2.1436 AU
- Semi-major axis: 2.4712 AU
- Eccentricity: 0.1325
- Orbital period (sidereal): 3.88 yr (1,419 days)
- Average orbital speed: 18.87 km/s
- Mean anomaly: 100.44°
- Mean motion: 0° 15^{m} 13.32^{s} / day
- Inclination: 5.5902°
- Longitude of ascending node: 125.56°
- Time of perihelion: 14 September 2027
- Argument of perihelion: 136.10°

Physical characteristics
- Mean diameter: 77 ± 8 km
- Mass: (5.7±1.5)×10^{17} kg (Note: Calculated from its standard gravitational parameter GM = 0.038±0.010 km^{3}/s^{2}.)
- Mean density: 2.38±0.97 g/cm^{3} (calculated)
- Synodic rotation period: 12.27048±0.00001
- Pole ecliptic longitude: 236°
- Pole ecliptic latitude: 20°
- Geometric albedo: 0.193±0.028
- Spectral type: B–V = 0.829; U–B = 0.438; S (Tholen); Sl (SMASS) · S
- Absolute magnitude (H): 7.91 · 7.76 · 7.85

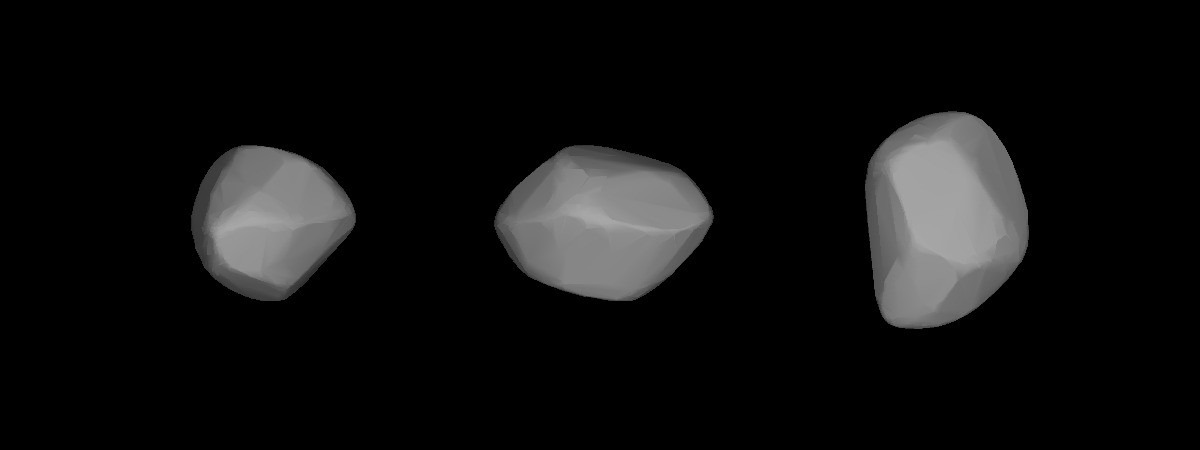
Lightcurve-base 3D-model of 17 Thetis.

17 Thetis is a stony asteroid from the inner regions of the asteroid belt, approximately 90 kilometers in diameter. It was discovered on 17 April 1852, by German astronomer Robert Luther at Bilk Observatory in Düsseldorf, Germany who deferred to Friedrich Wilhelm August Argelander the naming his first asteroid discovery after Thetis from Greek mythology. Its historical symbol was a dolphin and a star; it was encoded in Unicode 17.0 as U+1CECA 𜻊.

== Description ==
The asteroid orbits the Sun at a distance of 2.1–2.8 AU once every 3 years and 11 months (1,419 days). Its orbit has an eccentricity of 0.13 and an inclination of 6° with respect to the ecliptic.

The spectrum of this object indicates that it is an S-type asteroid with both low and high calcium forms of pyroxene on the surface, along with less than 20% olivine. The high-calcium form of pyroxene forms 40% or more of the total pyroxene present, indicating a history of igneous rock deposits. This suggests that the asteroid underwent differentiation by melting, creating a surface of basalt rock.

The mass of Thetis has been calculated from perturbations by 4 Vesta and 11 Parthenope. In 2007, Baer and Chesley calculated Thetis to have a mass of 1.23×10^{18} kg (Note: Mass of Thetis = (6.17±0.64)×10^{−13} M_{☉}) with a density of 3.21 g/cm^{3}. One Thetidian stellar occultation was observed from Oregon in 1999. However, the event was not timed.

This minor planet was named after Thetis, the mother of Achilles in Greek mythology.
