= Düsseldorf-Bilk Observatory =

Coordinates: 51.2074°N 6.7648°E

The Sternwarte Düsseldorf (a.k.a. Sternwarte Bilk, Sternwarte Charlottenruhe; Bilk Observatory or Düsseldorf-Bilk Observatory in English) in Düsseldorf-Bilk was a private observatory founded in 1843 by Johann Friedrich Benzenberg. The observatory's main feature was a refracting telescope with 1800mm focal length. After Benzenberg's death the observatory was bequeathed to the city of Düsseldorf. It was destroyed by bombing in 1943.

Between 1852 and 1890, C. Robert Luther discovered 24 asteroids there, from Thetis, discovered on April 17, 1852, to Glauke, discovered February 20, 1890. These asteroids and planetoids are called the 24 Düsseldorf planets. The asteroid 4425 Bilk is named in honour of the observatory.†

Near its original location, a benchmark was erected, displaying the observatory's burnt-out telescope.

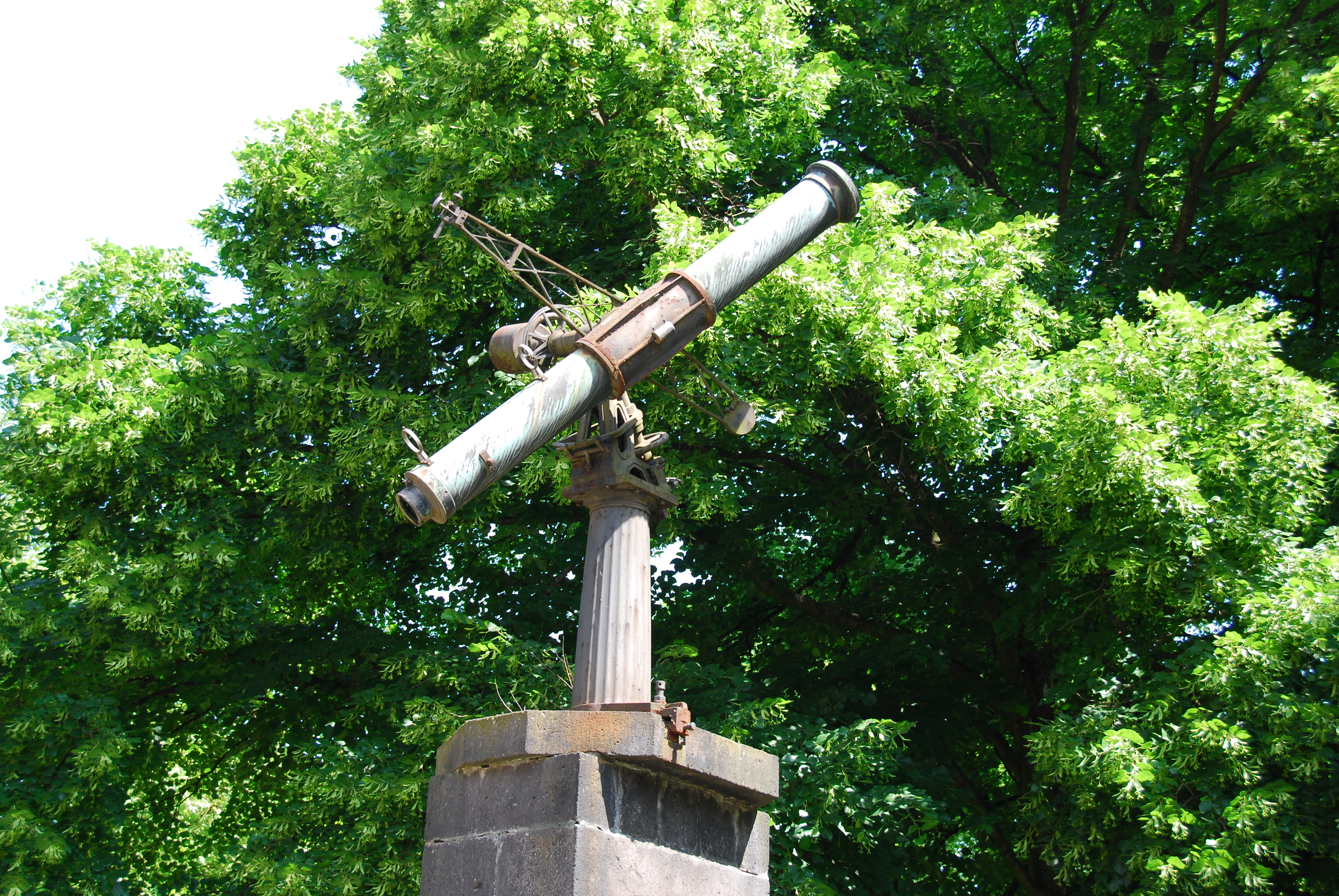
Benchmark

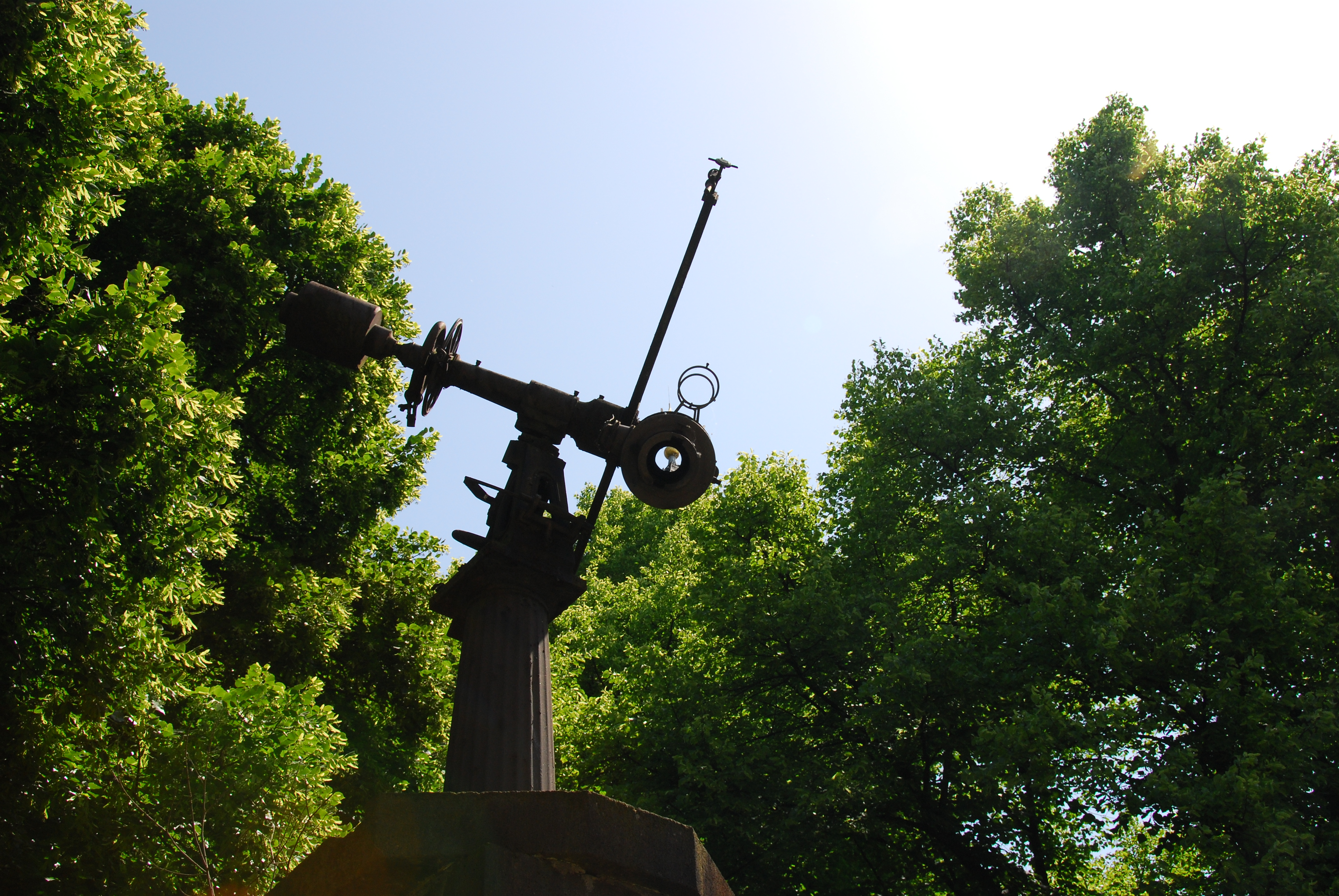
view through the tube

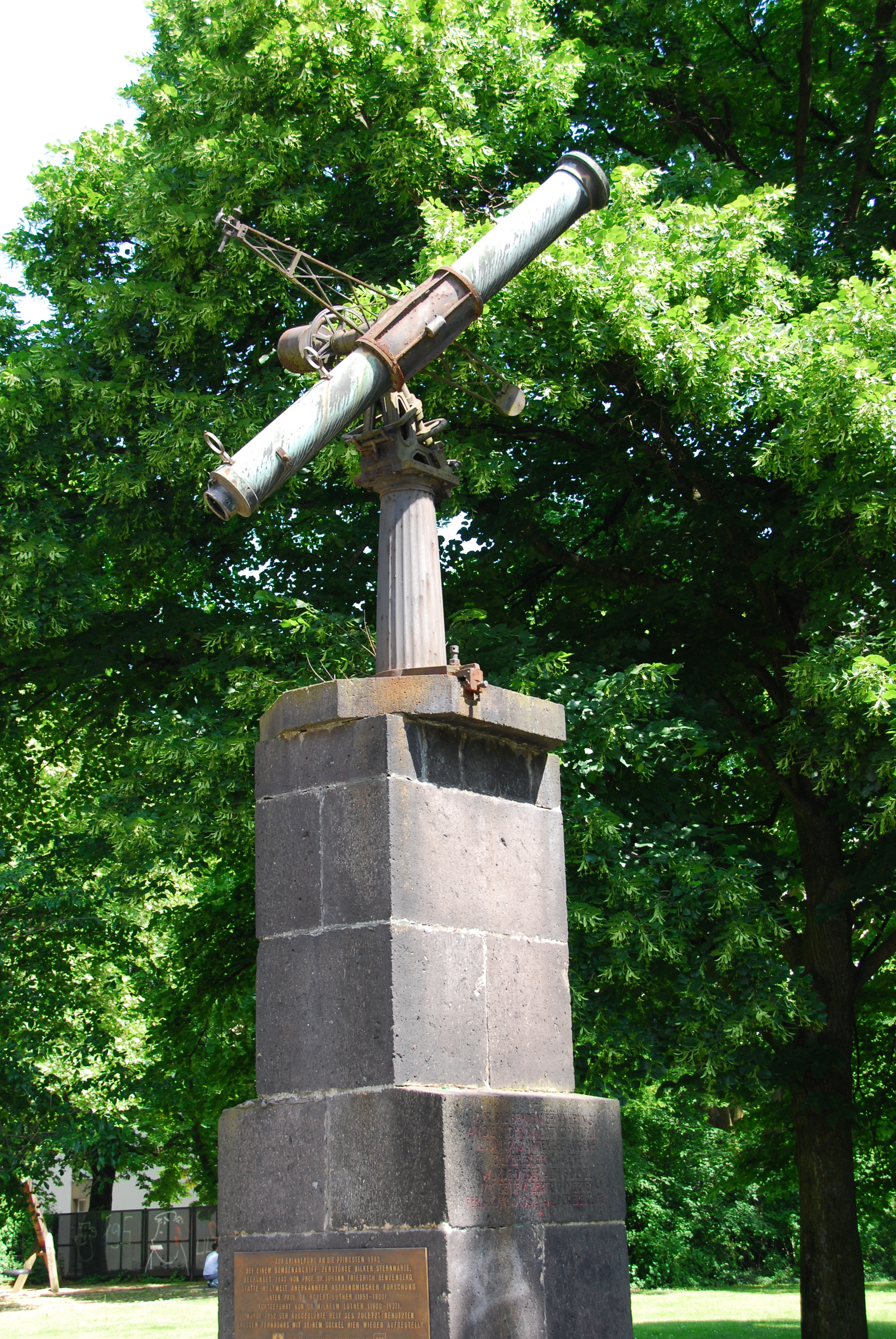
front view

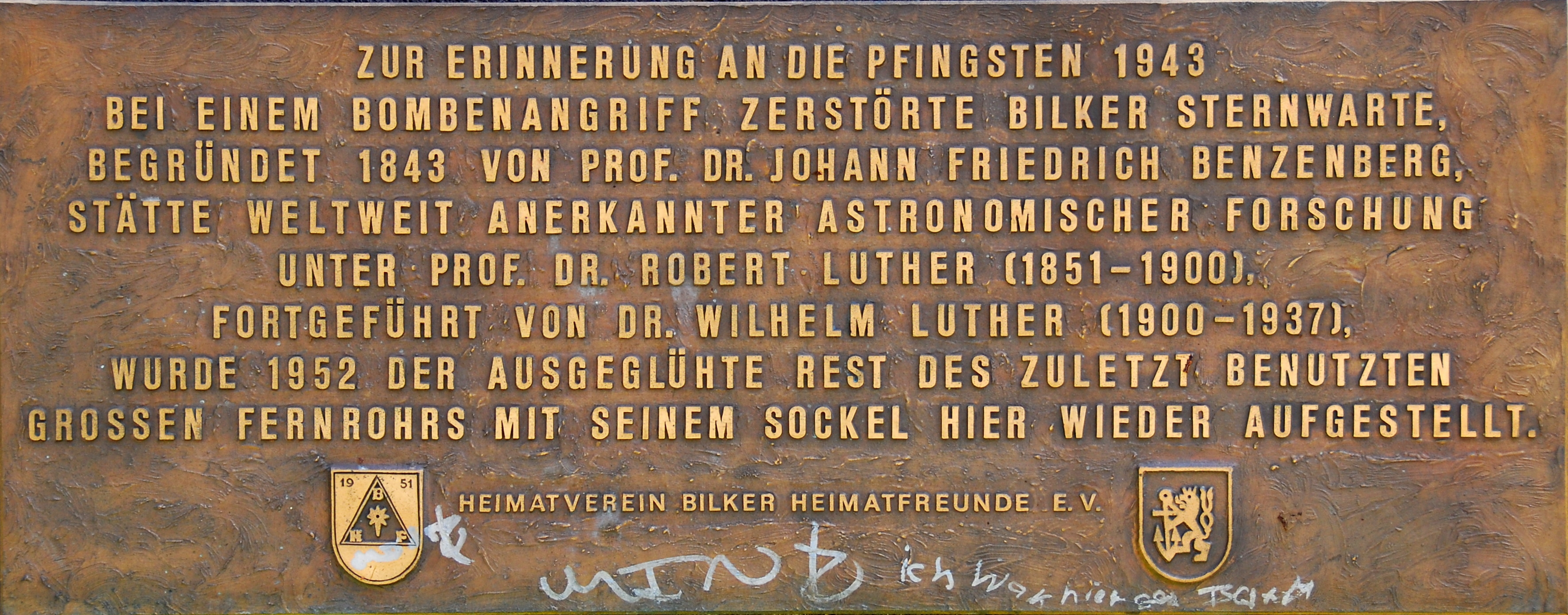
information plate

== See also ==
- List of astronomical observatories
