= 929 Algunde =

Main-belt asteroid

Discovery
- Discovered by: K. Reinmuth
- Discovery site: Heidelberg Obs.
- Discovery date: 10 March 1920

Designations
- Named after: Name picked from the almanac Lahrer Hinkender Bote
- Alternative designations: A920 ED · 1920 GR
- Minor planet category: main-belt · (inner); Flora · Bg

Orbital characteristics
- Epoch 31 May 2020 (JD 2459000.5)
- Uncertainty parameter 0
- Observation arc: 99.82 yr (36,460 d)
- Aphelion: 2.4921 AU
- Perihelion: 1.9859 AU
- Semi-major axis: 2.2390 AU
- Eccentricity: 0.1131
- Orbital period (sidereal): 3.35 yr (1,224 d)
- Mean anomaly: 249.25°
- Mean motion: 0° 17^{m} 39.12^{s} / day
- Inclination: 3.9128°
- Longitude of ascending node: 231.38°
- Argument of perihelion: 22.990°

Physical characteristics
- Mean diameter: 10.70±0.36 km; 11.443±0.190 km
- Synodic rotation period: 3.31016±0.00009 h
- Geometric albedo: 0.242±0.018; 0.272±0.072
- Spectral type: SMASS = S; S (S3OS2-TH); Sl (S3OS2-BB); S (Bus–DeMeo)
- Absolute magnitude (H): 11.7

929 Algunde (prov. designation: A920 ED or 1920 GR), is a stony Flora asteroid from the inner regions of the asteroid belt, that measures approximately 11 kilometers (7 miles) in diameter. It was discovered by German astronomer Karl Reinmuth at the Heidelberg-Königstuhl State Observatory on 10 March 1920. The S-type asteroid has a short rotation period of 3.3 hours and is likely spherical in shape. It was named "Algunde", a common German female name unrelated to the discoverer's contemporaries, that was taken from the almanac Lahrer Hinkender Bote.

== Orbit and classification ==
When applying the synthetic hierarchical clustering method (HCM) by Nesvorný, or the 1995 HCM-analysis by Zappalà, Algunde is a member of the Flora family (402), a giant asteroid family and the largest family of stony asteroids in the main-belt. However, according to another HCM-analysis by Milani and Knežević (AstDys), it is a background asteroid as this analysis does not recognize the Flora asteroid clan. Algunde orbits the Sun in the inner asteroid belt at a distance of 2.0–2.5 AU once every 3 years and 4 months (1,224 days; semi-major axis of 2.24 AU). Its orbit has an eccentricity of 0.11 and an inclination of 4° with respect to the ecliptic. The body's observation arc begins at Heidelberg Observatory on 12 March 1920, two nights after its official discovery observation.

== Naming ==
This minor planet was named "Algunde", after a female name picked from the Lahrer Hinkender Bote, published in Lahr, southern Germany. A Hinkender Bote (lit. "limping messenger") was a very popular almanac, especially in the alemannic-speaking region from the late 17th throughout the early 20th century. The calendar section contains feast days, the dates of important fairs and astronomical ephemerides. For 30 January, the calendar gives "Algunde" as the German name day analogue next to Adelgunde and Martina, the protestant and catholic entries in the calendar of saints, likely referring to Saint Aldegonde and Martina of Rome.

=== Reinmuth's calendar names ===
As with 22 other asteroids – starting with 913 Otila, and ending with 1144 Oda – Reinmuth selected names from this calendar due to his many asteroid discoveries that he had trouble thinking of proper names. These names are not related to the discoverer's contemporaries. Lutz Schmadel, the author of the Dictionary of Minor Planet Names learned about Reinmuth's source of inspiration from private communications with Dutch astronomer Ingrid van Houten-Groeneveld, who worked as a young astronomer at Heidelberg.

== Physical characteristics ==
In the Tholen classification, Algunde is a common stony S-type asteroid. It is also an S-type in the Bus–DeMeo taxonomy and in the Tholen-like taxonomy of the Small Solar System Objects Spectroscopic Survey (S3OS2). Only in the SMASS-like taxonomy of the S3OS2, Algunde is an Sl-subtype asteroid that transitions between the S-type and the uncommon L-type.

=== Rotation period ===
In March 2007, a rotational lightcurve of Algunde was obtained from photometric observations by Slovak astronomers Adrián Galád and Leonard Kornoš at Modra Observatory (118). Lightcurve analysis gave a well-defined rotation period of 3.31016±0.00009 hours with a low brightness amplitude of 0.14±0.01 magnitude, indicative of a spherical rather than elongated shape (U=3). Between 2008 and 2018, numerous follow-up observations by other astronomers confirmed the period of 3.31 hours with brightness variation maxima between 0.11 and 0.17.

=== Diameter and albedo ===
According to the survey carried out by the Japanese Akari satellite and the NEOWISE mission of NASA's Wide-field Infrared Survey Explorer (WISE), Algunde measures (10.70±0.36) and (11.443±0.190) kilometers in diameter and its surface has an albedo of (0.242±0.018) and (0.272±0.072), respectively. The Collaborative Asteroid Lightcurve Link takes Petr Pravec's revised WISE data with an albedo of 0.2055 and a diameter of 12.45 kilometers based on an absolute magnitude of 11.86. Another publication by the WISE team gives a mean-diameter of (12.440±0.073) kilometers and an albedo of (0.2348±0.0327).
