= 923 Herluga =

Three-body resonant background asteroid

Discovery
- Discovered by: K. Reinmuth
- Discovery site: Heidelberg Obs.
- Discovery date: 30 September 1919

Designations
- Named after: Name picked from the almanac Lahrer Hinkender Bote
- Alternative designations: A919 SK · A915 VD; 1919 GB · 1915 VD
- Minor planet category: main-belt · (middle) background

Orbital characteristics
- Epoch 31 May 2020 (JD 2459000.5)
- Uncertainty parameter 0
- Observation arc: 99.61 yr (36,382 d)
- Aphelion: 3.1271 AU
- Perihelion: 2.1071 AU
- Semi-major axis: 2.6171 AU
- Eccentricity: 0.1949
- Orbital period (sidereal): 4.23 yr (1,546 d)
- Mean anomaly: 268.52°
- Mean motion: 0° 13^{m} 58.08^{s} / day
- Inclination: 14.458°
- Longitude of ascending node: 197.52°
- Argument of perihelion: 201.11°

Physical characteristics
- Mean diameter: 36.2+0.4 −1.5 km (pole solution 1); 34.1+0.8 −1.0 km (pole solution 2)
- Synodic rotation period: 29.72820±0.00002 h (pole solution 1); 29.72826±0.00001 h (pole solution 2)
- Pole ecliptic longitude: 218° ± 9° or 334° ± 7°
- Pole ecliptic latitude: −68° ± 5° or −52° ± 3°
- Geometric albedo: 0.047+0.004 −0.003 (pole solution 1); 0.050+0.002 −0.003 (pole solution 2); 0.037±0.002; 0.037±0.006; 0.0421±0.002
- Spectral type: C (S3OS2)
- Absolute magnitude (H): 11.50

923 Herluga (prov. designation: A919 SK or 1919 GB) is a three-body resonant background asteroid, approximately 34 kilometers (21 miles) in diameter, located in the central region of the asteroid belt. It was discovered on 30 September 1919, by astronomer Karl Reinmuth at the Heidelberg Observatory in southwest Germany. The carbonaceous C-type asteroid has a rotation period of 19.7 hours. It was named "Herluga", a common German female name unrelated to the discoverer's contemporaries, that was taken from the almanac Lahrer Hinkender Bote.

== Orbit and classification ==
Herluga is a non-family asteroid of the main belt's background population when applying the hierarchical clustering method to its proper orbital elements. Located in the orbital region of the Eunomia family, Herluga orbits the Sun in the central asteroid belt at a distance of 2.1–3.1 AU once every 4 years and 3 months (1,546 days; semi-major axis of 2.62 AU). Its orbit has an eccentricity of 0.19 and an inclination of 14° with respect to the ecliptic. This brings the object into a pure three-body resonance (2/2/-1) with Jupiter and Saturn (a_{res} 2.615 AU). Other asteroids in this resonant group of 34 known objects include 70 Panopaea, 194 Prokne, 258 Tyche, 839 Valborg and 995 Sternberga. Herluga was first observed as A915 VD (1915 VD) at Simeiz Observatory on the Crimean peninsula on 9 November 1915. The body's observation arc begins at Heidelberg Observatory on 10 December 1919, more than two months after its official discovery observation.

== Naming ==
This minor planet was named "Herluga", after a female name picked from the Lahrer Hinkender Bote, published in Lahr, southern Germany. A Hinkender Bote (lit. "limping messenger") was a very popular almanac, especially in the alemannic-speaking region from the late 17th throughout the early 20th century. The calendar section contains feast days, the dates of important fairs and astronomical ephemerides. For 2 March, the calendar gives "Herluga" as the German name day analogue next to Simplizius and Luise, the protestant and catholic entries in the calendar of saints.

=== Reinmuth's calendar names ===
As with 22 other asteroids – starting with 913 Otila, and ending with 1144 Oda – Reinmuth selected names from this calendar due to his many asteroid discoveries that he had trouble thinking of proper names. These names are not related to the discoverer's contemporaries. Lutz Schmadel, the author of the Dictionary of Minor Planet Names learned about Reinmuth's source of inspiration from private communications with Dutch astronomer Ingrid van Houten-Groeneveld, who worked as a young astronomer at Heidelberg.

== Physical characteristics ==
In both the Tholen- and SMASS-like taxonomy of the Small Solar System Objects Spectroscopic Survey (S3OS2), Herluga is a common, carbonaceous C-type asteroid.

=== Rotation period ===
In November 2008, a rotational lightcurve of Herluga was obtained from photometric observations by James W. Brinsfield at the Via Capote Observatory (G69) in California. Lightcurve analysis gave a rotation period of 19.746±0.002 hours with a brightness variation of 0.16±0.02 magnitude (U=2). In August 2016, an alternative period determination of 29.71±0.04 hours with an amplitude of 0.28±0.02 mag was published (U=2).

=== Diameter and albedo ===
According to the survey carried out by the NEOWISE mission of NASA's Wide-field Infrared Survey Explorer (WISE), the Japanese Akari satellite, and the Infrared Astronomical Satellite IRAS, Herluga measures (32.47±0.8), (34.553±0.269) and (34.78±0.63) kilometers in diameter and its surface has a low albedo of (0.0421±0.002), (0.037±0.006) and (0.037±0.002), respectively. The Collaborative Asteroid Lightcurve Link adopts the results obtained by IRAS, that is, an albedo of 0.0421 and a diameter of 32.47 km based on an absolute magnitude of 11.5. Further published mean-diameters by the WISE team in ascending order include (30.558±10.39 km), (31.89±10.59 km), (33.794±7.947 km), (34.142±10.733 km) and (37.638±0.190 km) with albedos between 0.03 and 0.06.
