= 940 Kordula =

Large and dark Cybele asteroid

Discovery
- Discovered by: K. Reinmuth
- Discovery site: Heidelberg Obs.
- Discovery date: 10 October 1920

Designations
- Named after: Name picked from the almanac Lahrer Hinkender Bote
- Alternative designations: A920 TE · 1947 BG; 1947 EB · 1954 DB; 1963 PC · 1920 HT
- Minor planet category: main-belt · (outer); Cybele

Orbital characteristics
- Epoch 31 May 2020 (JD 2459000.5)
- Uncertainty parameter 0
- Observation arc: 99.24 yr (36,248 d)
- Aphelion: 3.9375 AU
- Perihelion: 2.7940 AU
- Semi-major axis: 3.3657 AU
- Eccentricity: 0.1699
- Orbital period (sidereal): 6.17 yr (2,255 d)
- Mean anomaly: 41.359°
- Mean motion: 0° 9^{m} 34.56^{s} / day
- Inclination: 6.2428°
- Longitude of ascending node: 66.320°
- Argument of perihelion: 283.51°

Physical characteristics
- Mean diameter: 79.852±0.504 km; 87.21±2.6 km; 87.65±1.50 km
- Synodic rotation period: 15.57±0.36 h
- Geometric albedo: 0.035±0.002; 0.0352±0.002; 0.041±0.009
- Spectral type: Tholen = FC: B–V = 0.580±0.026; U–B = 0.363±0.037
- Absolute magnitude (H): 9.2; 9.3

940 Kordula (prov. designation: A920 TE or 1920 HT) is a large and dark Cybele asteroid from the outermost region of the asteroid belt, approximately 80 kilometers (50 miles) in diameter. It was discovered on 10 October 1920, by astronomer Karl Reinmuth at the Heidelberg-Königstuhl State Observatory in Germany. The carbonaceous F-type asteroid (FC) has a rotation period of 15.6 hours. It was named "Kordula", a common German female name unrelated to the discoverer's contemporaries, that was taken from the almanac Lahrer Hinkender Bote.

== Orbit and classification ==
Kordula is a non-family asteroid of the main belt's background population when applying the hierarchical clustering method to its proper orbital elements. It is located in the orbital region of the Cybele asteroids. The Cybeles are the last outpost of the extended asteroid belt, already located beyond the Hecuba gap. It orbits the Sun in the outermost asteroid belt at a distance of 2.8–3.9 AU once every 6 years and 2 months (2,255 days; semi-major axis of 3.37 AU). Its orbit has an eccentricity of 0.17 and an inclination of 6° with respect to the ecliptic. The body's observation arc begins at Heidelberg Observatory on 11 October 1920, the night after its official discovery observation.

== Naming ==
This minor planet was named "Kordula", after a female name picked from the Lahrer Hinkender Bote, published in Lahr, southern Germany. A Hinkender Bote (lit. "limping messenger") was a very popular almanac, especially in the alemannic-speaking region from the late 17th throughout the early 20th century. The calendar section contains feast days, the dates of important fairs and astronomical ephemerides. The calendar contains a German name day analogue for the respective catholic and protestant feast-days (entry not found). "Kordula" derives from Cordula and may refer to Saint Cordula.

=== Reinmuth's calendar names ===
As with 22 other asteroids – starting with 913 Otila, and ending with 1144 Oda – Reinmuth selected names from this calendar due to his many asteroid discoveries that he had trouble thinking of proper names. These names are not related to the discoverer's contemporaries. Lutz Schmadel, the author of the Dictionary of Minor Planet Names learned about Reinmuth's source of inspiration from private communications with Dutch astronomer Ingrid van Houten-Groeneveld, who worked as a young astronomer at Heidelberg.

== Physical characteristics ==
In the Tholen classification, Kordula is closest to an F-type asteroid, and somewhat similar to that to a common carbonaceous C-type asteroid.

=== Rotation period ===
In October 1999, a rotational lightcurve of Kordula was obtained from photometric observations by Vincenzo Zappalà and his Italian colleagues. Lightcurve analysis gave a well-defined rotation period of 15.57 hours with a brightness amplitude of 0.36 magnitude (U=3).

=== Diameter and albedo ===
According to the surveys carried out by the NEOWISE mission of NASA's Wide-field Infrared Survey Explorer (WISE), the Infrared Astronomical Satellite IRAS, and the Japanese Akari satellite, Kordula measures (79.852±0.504), (87.21±2.6) and (87.65±1.50) kilometers in diameter, and its surface has an albedo of (0.041±0.009), (0.0352±0.002) and (0.035±0.002), respectively.

Further published mean-diameters and albedos by the WISE team include (77.941±26.705 km), (87.10±25.52 km), (87.29±33.02 km), and (93.192±1.325 km) with corresponding albedos of (0.044±0.024), (0.04±0.03), (0.04±0.03), and (0.0308±0.0066). The Collaborative Asteroid Lightcurve Link adopts the results from IRAS, that is, an albedo of 0.0352 and a diameter of 87.21 km based on an absolute magnitude of 9.55.
