= 926 Imhilde =

Main-belt asteroid

Discovery
- Discovered by: K. Reinmuth
- Discovery site: Heidelberg Obs.
- Discovery date: 15 February 1920

Designations
- Named after: Name picked from the almanac Lahrer Hinkender Bote
- Alternative designations: A920 CB · 1920 GN; 1931 GB · 1964 WB
- Minor planet category: main-belt · (outer); Imhilde

Orbital characteristics
- Epoch 31 May 2020 (JD 2459000.5)
- Uncertainty parameter 0
- Observation arc: 99.70 yr (36,416 d)
- Aphelion: 3.5251 AU
- Perihelion: 2.4365 AU
- Semi-major axis: 2.9808 AU
- Eccentricity: 0.1826
- Orbital period (sidereal): 5.15 yr (1,880 d)
- Mean anomaly: 97.231°
- Mean motion: 0° 11^{m} 29.4^{s} / day
- Inclination: 16.325°
- Longitude of ascending node: 48.971°
- Argument of perihelion: 173.79°

Physical characteristics
- Mean diameter: 46.369±1.133 km; 48.48±1.1 km; 49.87±0.92 km
- Synodic rotation period: 26.8±0.5 h (Note: Lightcurve plot of (926) Imhilde, Palmer Divide Observatory, Brian Warner (2003): rotation period 26.8±0.5 hours with a brightness amplitude of 0.27±0.02 mag. Quality code of 2. Summary figures for at the LCDB.)
- Geometric albedo: 0.052±0.007; 0.054±0.002; 0.0570±0.003
- Spectral type: C (SDSS-MOC)
- Absolute magnitude (H): 10.5

926 Imhilde (prov. designation: A920 CB or 1920 GN) is a dark asteroid and the principal body and namesake of the Imhilde family, located in the outer regions of the asteroid belt. It was discovered by astronomer Karl Reinmuth at the Heidelberg Observatory in southwest Germany on 15 February 1920. The carbonaceous C-type asteroid has a rotation period of 26.8 hours and measures approximately 48 kilometers (30 miles) in diameter. It was named "Imhilde", a common German female name unrelated to the discoverer's contemporaries, that was taken from the almanac Lahrer Hinkender Bote.

== Orbit and classification ==
When applying the synthetic hierarchical clustering method (HCM) by Nesvorný, Imhilde is the principal body and namesake of the Imhilde family (639), a small asteroid cluster with only a few dozens members. However, according to another HCM-analysis by Milani and Knežević (AstDys), it is a background asteroid as the analysis does not recognize this family. Imhilde orbits the Sun in the outer asteroid belt at a distance of 2.4–3.5 AU once every 5 years and 2 months (1,880 days; semi-major axis of 2.98 AU). Its orbit has an eccentricity of 0.18 and an inclination of 16° with respect to the ecliptic. The body's observation arc begins at Heidelberg Observatory on 17 February 1920, two nights after its official discovery observation.

== Naming ==
This minor planet was named "Imhilde", after a female name picked from the Lahrer Hinkender Bote, published in Lahr, southern Germany. A Hinkender Bote (lit. "limping messenger") was a very popular almanac, especially in the alemannic-speaking region from the late 17th throughout the early 20th century. The calendar section contains feast days, the dates of important fairs and astronomical ephemerides. For 15 May, the calendar gives "Imhilde" as the German name day analogue next to Sophie and Torquatus, the protestant and catholic entries in the calendar of saints, likely referring to Sophia of Rome and Torquatus of Acci.

=== Reinmuth's calendar names ===
As with 22 other asteroids – starting with 913 Otila, and ending with 1144 Oda – Reinmuth selected names from this calendar due to his many asteroid discoveries that he had trouble thinking of proper names. These names are not related to the discoverer's contemporaries. Lutz Schmadel, the author of the Dictionary of Minor Planet Names learned about Reinmuth's source of inspiration from private communications with Dutch astronomer Ingrid van Houten-Groeneveld, who worked as a young astronomer at Heidelberg.

== Physical characteristics ==
In the SDSS-based taxonomy, Imhilde is a carbonaceous C-type asteroid. The Imhilde family's overall spectral type is CX.

=== Rotation period ===
In April 2003, a rotational lightcurve of Imhilde was obtained from photometric observations by Brian Warner at the Palmer Divide Observatory (716) in Colorado. In 2011, after more than a decade of additional experience in asteroid lightcurve photometry, Warner reexamined the data set using improved tools and techniques. Lightcurve analysis gave a rotation period of 26.8±0.5 hours with a brightness variation of 0.27±0.02 magnitude (U=2). Originally, the same data gave a period of 26.1±0.5 hours with an amplitude 0.2±0.02 magnitude (U=2).

=== Diameter and albedo ===
According to the survey carried out by the NEOWISE mission of NASA's Wide-field Infrared Survey Explorer (WISE), the Infrared Astronomical Satellite IRAS, and the Japanese Akari satellite, Imhilde measures (46.369±1.133), (48.48±1.1) and (49.87±0.92) kilometers in diameter and its surface has a low albedo of (0.052±0.007), (0.0570±0.003) and (0.054±0.002), respectively.

The Collaborative Asteroid Lightcurve Link derives an albedo of 0.0476 and a diameter of 48.39 km based on an absolute magnitude of 10.5. Further published mean-diameters and albedos by the WISE team include (44.148±10.193 km) and (46.37±1.13 km) and albedos of (0.055±0.020) and (0.052±0.007). An asteroid occultation observed on 8 November 2011, gave a best-fit ellipse dimension of 49.0 × 49.0 kilometers. These timed observations are taken when the asteroid passes in front of a distant star. However the quality of the measurement is rated poorly.
