= 948 Jucunda =

Background asteroid

Discovery
- Discovered by: K. Reinmuth
- Discovery site: Heidelberg Obs.
- Discovery date: 3 March 1921

Designations
- Named after: Name picked from the almanac Lahrer Hinkender Bote
- Alternative designations: A921 EL · 1921 JE
- Minor planet category: main-belt · (outer) background

Orbital characteristics
- Epoch 31 May 2020 (JD 2459000.5)
- Uncertainty parameter 0
- Observation arc: 98.85 yr (36,104 d)
- Aphelion: 3.5276 AU
- Perihelion: 2.5362 AU
- Semi-major axis: 3.0319 AU
- Eccentricity: 0.1635
- Orbital period (sidereal): 5.28 yr (1,928 d)
- Mean anomaly: 277.84°
- Mean motion: 0° 11^{m} 12.12^{s} / day
- Inclination: 8.6536°
- Longitude of ascending node: 357.10°
- Argument of perihelion: 163.29°

Physical characteristics
- Mean diameter: 17.331±0.194 km; 17.77±1.08 km
- Synodic rotation period: 26.24±0.01 h
- Geometric albedo: 0.170±0.022; 0.196±0.037
- Spectral type: C (assumed)
- Absolute magnitude (H): 11.5

948 Jucunda (provisional designation: A921 EL or 1921 JE) is a background asteroid, approximately 17 kilometers (11 miles) in diameter, located in the outer region of the asteroid belt. It was discovered on 3 March 1921, by astronomer Karl Reinmuth at the Heidelberg-Königstuhl State Observatory in southwest Germany. The asteroid has a longer-than average rotation period of 26.2 hours. It was named after a common German female name, unrelated to the discoverer's contemporaries, that was taken from the almanac Lahrer Hinkender Bote.

== Orbit and classification ==
Jucunda is a non-family asteroid of the main belt's background population when applying the hierarchical clustering method to its proper orbital elements. It orbits the Sun in the outer asteroid belt at a distance of 2.5–3.5 AU once every 5 years and 3 months (1,928 days; semi-major axis of 3.03 AU). Its orbit has an eccentricity of 0.16 and an inclination of 9° with respect to the ecliptic. The body's observation arc begins at Heidelberg/Vienna Observatory on 10 March 1921, one week after its official discovery observation.

== Naming ==
This minor planet was named "Jucunda", after a female name picked from the Lahrer Hinkender Bote, published in Lahr, southern Germany. A Hinkender Bote (lit. "limping messenger") was a very popular almanac, especially in the alemannic-speaking region from the late 17th throughout the early 20th century. The calendar section contains feast days, the dates of important fairs and astronomical ephemerides. The calendar contains a German name day analogue for the respective catholic and protestant feast-days (entry not found). The name derives from iucundus, Latin for "pleasant" or "agreeable".

=== Reinmuth's calendar names ===
As with 913 Otila, 994 Otthild, 997 Priska and 1144 Oda, Reinmuth selected names from this calendar due to his many asteroid discoveries that he had trouble thinking of proper names. These names are not related to the discoverer's contemporaries. Lutz Schmadel, the author of the Dictionary of Minor Planet Names learned about Reinmuth's source of inspiration from private communications with Dutch astronomer Ingrid van Houten-Groeneveld, who worked as a young astronomer at Heidelberg.

== Physical characteristics ==
Jucunda is an assumed carbonaceous C-type asteroid. However, most published albedos are between 0.13 and 0.19, too high to agree with a carbonaceous spectral type (see below).

=== Rotation period ===
In April 2011, a rotational lightcurve of Jucunda was obtained from photometric observations by Robert Stephens at the Santana Observatory (646) and Goat Mountain Astronomical Research Station (G79) in California. Lightcurve analysis gave a rotation period of 26.24±0.01 hours with a brightness amplitude of 0.30±0.03 magnitude (U=3). Observations in March 2011, by Luca Strabla, Ulisse Quadri and Roberto Girelli at Bassano Bresciano Observatory (565) gave a period of 28.639±0.012 hours with an amplitude of 0.35±0.05 magnitude (U=2+). Additional period determinations of 27.6 h (1.150 d) and 27.9 h (1.16220 d) were made by Eric Barbotin and Raoul Behrend in November 2019, and by Pierre Antonini in March 2011 (U=n.a.).

=== Diameter and albedo ===
According to the survey carried out by the NEOWISE mission of NASA's Wide-field Infrared Survey Explorer (WISE) and the Japanese Akari satellite, Jucunda measures 17.331±0.194 and 17.77±1.08 kilometers in diameter and its surface has an albedo of 0.196±0.037 and 0.170±0.022, respectively. The Collaborative Asteroid Lightcurve Link assumes a standard albedo for a carbonaceous asteroid of 0.057 and calculates a diameter of 27.90 kilometers based on an absolute magnitude of 11.5. Additional measurements were published by the WISE team (all of them have larger diameters with lower albedos). They are: 18.116±0.134 km (2011), 19.38±0.23 km (2012) and 20.00±5.78 km (2016) with the corresponding albedos of 0.1635±0.0282, 0.130±0.015 and 0.09±0.07, respectively.
