= 983 Gunila =

Main-belt asteroid

Discovery
- Discovered by: K. Reinmuth
- Discovery site: Heidelberg Obs.
- Discovery date: 30 July 1922

Designations
- Named after: Name picked from the almanac Lahrer Hinkender Bote
- Alternative designations: A922 OD · 1934 SE; 1940 TF · 1944 LA; 1949 JB · 1955 HV; 1922 ME · 1949 JB
- Minor planet category: main-belt · (outer) background

Orbital characteristics
- Epoch 31 May 2020 (JD 2459000.5)
- Uncertainty parameter 0
- Observation arc: 97.43 yr (35,585 d)
- Aphelion: 3.4513 AU
- Perihelion: 2.8707 AU
- Semi-major axis: 3.1610 AU
- Eccentricity: 0.0919
- Orbital period (sidereal): 5.62 yr (2,053 d)
- Mean anomaly: 209.40°
- Mean motion: 0° 10^{m} 31.44^{s} / day
- Inclination: 14.868°
- Longitude of ascending node: 250.70°
- Argument of perihelion: 348.40°

Physical characteristics
- Mean diameter: 73.87±1.3 km; 92.90±1.44 km; 95.689±1.941 km
- Synodic rotation period: 8.37±0.12 h
- Geometric albedo: 0.028±0.010; 0.0477±0.002; 0.031±0.001
- Spectral type: Tholen = XD; X (S3OS2-TH); Xk (S3OS2-BB); B–V = 0.744±0.062; U–B = 0.267±0.072
- Absolute magnitude (H): 9.4

983 Gunila (prov. designation: A922 OD or 1922 ME), is a dark background asteroid from the outer regions of the asteroid belt, approximately 74 kilometers (46 miles) in diameter. It was discovered on 30 July 1922, by astronomer Karl Reinmuth at the Heidelberg-Königstuhl State Observatory in Germany. The X-type asteroid has an ambiguous rotation period of 8.3 or 16.6 hours. It was named "Gunila", a common German female name unrelated to the discoverer's contemporaries, that was taken from the almanac Lahrer Hinkender Bote.

== Orbit and classification ==
Gunila is a non-family asteroid of the main belt's background population when applying the hierarchical clustering method to its proper orbital elements. It orbits the Sun in the outer asteroid belt at a distance of 2.9–3.5 AU once every 5 years and 7 months (2,053 days; semi-major axis of 3.16 AU). Its orbit has an eccentricity of 0.09 and an inclination of 15° with respect to the ecliptic. The body's observation arc begins at the Vienna Observatory on 21 August 1922, or three weeks after its official discovery observation at Heidelberg.

== Naming ==
This minor planet was named "Gunila", after a female name picked from the Lahrer Hinkender Bote, published in Lahr, southern Germany. A Hinkender Bote (lit. "limping messenger") was a very popular almanac, especially in the alemannic-speaking region from the late 17th throughout the early 20th century. The calendar section contains feast/name days, the dates of important fairs and astronomical ephemerides. For 9 November, the calendar gives "Gunila" as the German analogue for Theodor and Erbo, the respective Catholic and Protestant feast-days. Former is likely related to Saint Theodore of Amasea (died 306), whose feast day is also 9 November.

=== Reinmuth's calendar names ===
As with 22 other asteroids – starting with 913 Otila, and ending with 1144 Oda – Reinmuth selected names from this calendar due to his many asteroid discoveries that he had trouble thinking of proper names. These names are not related to the discoverer's contemporaries. Lutz Schmadel, the author of the Dictionary of Minor Planet Names learned about Reinmuth's source of inspiration from private communications with Dutch astronomer Ingrid van Houten-Groeneveld, who worked as a young astronomer at Heidelberg.

== Physical characteristics ==
In the Tholen classification, Gunila is an X-type asteroid, and somewhat similar to that of a dark D-type (XD). In the Tholen-like taxonomy of the Small Solar System Objects Spectroscopic Survey (S3OS2), the asteroid is also an X-type, while in the S3OS2-survey's SMASS-like taxonomy it is an Xk-subtype that transitions to the K-type asteroids.

=== Rotation period ===
In October 2013, a rotational lightcurve of Gunila was obtained from photometric observations by the ASTR315 class at the University of Maryland. Lightcurve analysis gave an ambiguous rotation period of 8.37±0.12 hours with a low brightness variation of 0.11±0.01 magnitude (U=2), indicative of a rather spherical shape. An alternative period determination by Tom Polakis in 2018 gave 16.633±0.023 hours (or twice the period), also with a low amplitude of 0.12±0.02 magnitude (U=2). In September 2001, an unsuccessful attempt to measure the asteroid's period was made by Brian Warner at the Palmer Divide Observatory in Colorado (U=n.a.). (Note: Lightcurve plot of (983) Gunila, Palmer Divide Observatory, B. D. Warner (2001) rotation period undetermined with little to no brightness amplitude. Quality code of n.a. The asteroid might have very long period or it could have short period with a lightcurve that shows no amplitude. Summary figures at the LCDB)

=== Diameter and albedo ===
According to the survey carried out by the Infrared Astronomical Satellite IRAS, Gunila measures 73.87±1.3 kilometers (km) in diameter and its surface has an albedo of 0.0477±0.002. The Japanese Akari satellite gave a larger diameter of 92.90±1.44 km and an albedo of 0.031±0.001, as did various publications of the NEOWISE mission of NASA's Wide-field Infrared Survey Explorer, with diameters of 95.689±1.941 km or larger. The Collaborative Asteroid Lightcurve Link adopts the results from IRAS, and gives a diameter of 73.87 km with an albedo of 0.0477 based on an absolute magnitude of 9.58.

Three asteroid occultations between 2006 and 2014, gave an estimated diameter of 74, 92 and 93 kilometers, respectively. These timed observations are taken when the asteroid passes in front of a distant star. However the measurements for Gunila were of poor quality in all three cases.
