= 920 Rogeria =

Dark background asteroid

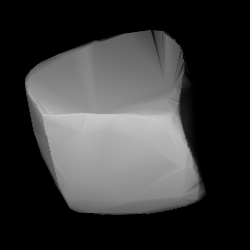
- Modelled shape of Rogeria from its lightcurve

Discovery
- Discovered by: K. Reinmuth
- Discovery site: Heidelberg Obs.
- Discovery date: 1 September 1919

Designations
- Named after: Name picked from the almanac Lahrer Hinkender Bote
- Alternative designations: A919 RC · 1919 FT; 1973 QC
- Minor planet category: main-belt · (middle) background

Orbital characteristics
- Epoch 31 May 2020 (JD 2459000.5)
- Uncertainty parameter 0
- Observation arc: 99.69 yr (36,412 d)
- Aphelion: 2.8993 AU
- Perihelion: 2.3476 AU
- Semi-major axis: 2.6234 AU
- Eccentricity: 0.1051
- Orbital period (sidereal): 4.25 yr (1,552 d)
- Mean anomaly: 162.25°
- Mean motion: 0° 13^{m} 55.2^{s} / day
- Inclination: 11.577°
- Longitude of ascending node: 192.79°
- Argument of perihelion: 268.97°

Physical characteristics
- Mean diameter: 23.89±0.9 km; 25.80±0.36 km; 26.656±0.168 km
- Synodic rotation period: 12.244±0.003 h
- Pole ecliptic latitude: (238.0°, −15.0°) (λ_{1}/β_{1}); (47.0°, −35.0°) (λ_{2}/β_{2})
- Geometric albedo: 0.076±0.012; 0.090±0.003; 0.1035±0.008
- Spectral type: Tholen = DTU; X (SDSS-MOC); B–V = 0.800±0.020; U–B = 0.300±0.032
- Absolute magnitude (H): 11.3

920 Rogeria (prov. designation: A919 RC or 1919 FT) is a dark background asteroid from the central region of the asteroid belt, discovered by German astronomer Karl Reinmuth at the Heidelberg-Königstuhl State Observatory on 1 September 1919. The D-type asteroid (DT) has a rotation period of 12.2 hours and measures approximately 26 kilometers (16 miles) in diameter. It was named "Rogeria", a name unrelated to the discoverer's contemporaries, that was taken from the almanac Lahrer Hinkender Bote.

== Orbit and classification ==
Rogeria, located in the orbital region of the Eunomia family, is a non-family asteroid of the main belt's background population when applying the hierarchical clustering method to its proper orbital elements. It orbits the Sun in the central asteroid belt at a distance of 2.3–2.9 AU once every 4 years and 3 months (1,552 days; semi-major axis of 2.62 AU). Its orbit has an eccentricity of 0.11 and an inclination of 12° with respect to the ecliptic. The body's observation arc begins at Heidelberg Observatory with its official discovery observation.

== Naming ==
This minor planet was named after the feminine form of the name "Roger", picked from the Lahrer Hinkender Bote, which was published in Lahr, southern Germany. A Hinkender Bote (lit. "limping messenger") was a very popular almanac, especially in the alemannic-speaking region from the late 17th throughout the early 20th century. The calendar section contains feast days, the dates of important fairs and astronomical ephemerides. For 5 January, the calendar gives "Roger" as the German name day analogue next to Simeon and Telesph., the Protestant and catholic entries in the calendar of saints, likely referring to Simeon Stylites and Pope Telesphorus.

=== Reinmuth's calendar names ===
As with 22 other asteroids – starting with 913 Otila, and ending with 1144 Oda – Reinmuth selected names from this calendar due to his many asteroid discoveries that he had trouble thinking of proper names. These names are not related to the discoverer's contemporaries. Lutz Schmadel, the author of the Dictionary of Minor Planet Names learned about Reinmuth's source of inspiration from private communications with Dutch astronomer Ingrid van Houten-Groeneveld, who worked as a young astronomer at Heidelberg.

== Physical characteristics ==
In the Tholen classification, Rogeria is closest to a dark D-type and somewhat similar to an uncommon T-type asteroid, though with an unusual spectrum (DTU). D-type asteroids are more common further out the asteroid belt and among the Jupiter trojan population. In the SDSS-based taxonomy, Rogeria is an X-type asteroid.

=== Rotation period and poles ===
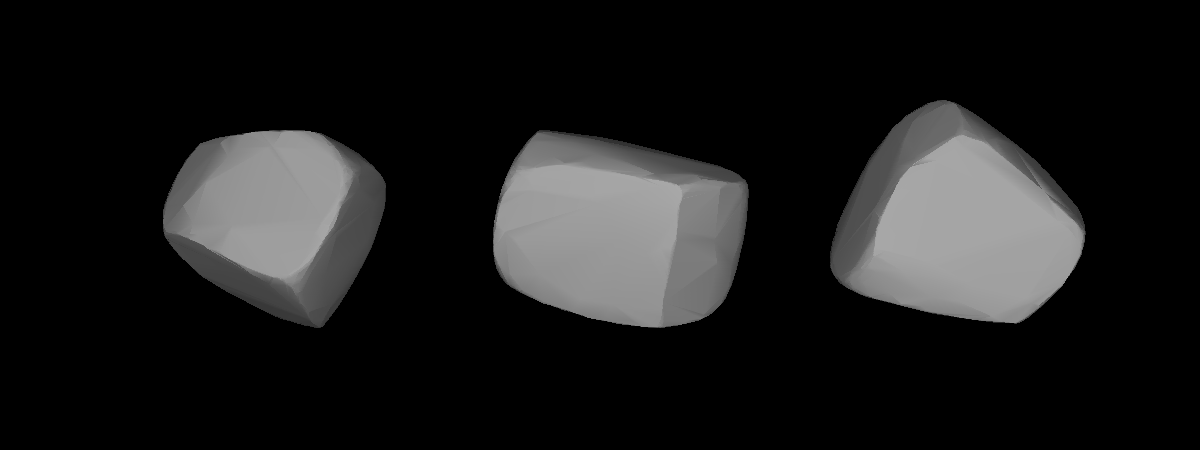
Lightcurve-based 3D-model of Rogeria

In October 2010, a rotational lightcurve of Rogeria was obtained from photometric observations by Thomas A. Polakis at the Command Module Observatory (V02) in Arizona. Lightcurve analysis gave a rotation period of 12.244±0.003 hours with a brightness variation of 0.31±0.03 magnitude (U=3−). A tentative period determination of 9.05±0.05 hours with an amplitude of 0.21±0.01 magnitude was made by French amateur French astronomer René Roy in July 2012 (U=2−). Another observation by Petr Pravec and Peter Kušnirák at Ondřejov Observatory in June 2007 gave a period of 8.09 hours (U=2−). (Note: lightcurve plot of (920) Rogeria by Pravec and Kusnirak at Ondřejov Observatory (2012). Rotation period 8.09 hours with a brightness amplitude of 0.16 mag. Quality Code is 2−. Summary figures at the LCDB and Pravec, P.; Wolf, M.; Sarounova, L. (2007) (Ondrejov data).)

In 2016, a modeled lightcurve gave a concurring sidereal period of 12.5749±0.0002 hours using data from the Uppsala Asteroid Photometric Catalogue, the Palomar Transient Factory survey, and individual observers (such as above), as well as sparse-in-time photometry from the NOFS, the Catalina Sky Survey, and the La Palma surveys (950). The study also determined two spin axes of (238.0°, −15.0°) and (47.0°, −35.0°) in ecliptic coordinates (λ, β).

=== Diameter and albedo ===
According to the survey carried out by the Infrared Astronomical Satellite IRAS, the Japanese Akari satellite, and the NEOWISE mission of NASA's Wide-field Infrared Survey Explorer (WISE), Rogeria measures (23.89±0.9), (25.80±0.36) and (26.656±0.168) kilometers in diameter and its surface has a low albedo of (0.1035±0.008), (0.090±0.003) and (0.076±0.012), respectively.

The Collaborative Asteroid Lightcurve Link derives an albedo of 0.0613 and a diameter of 29.71 km based on an absolute magnitude of 11.285. Further published mean-diameters and albedos by the WISE team include (22.03±4.45 km), (23.69±7.40 km) and (29.683±0.260 km) with corresponding albedos of (0.09±0.06), (0.09±0.05) and (0.0670±0.0030).
