= 921 Jovita =

Dark background asteroid

Discovery
- Discovered by: K. Reinmuth
- Discovery site: Heidelberg Obs.
- Discovery date: 4 September 1919

Designations
- Named after: Name picked from the almanac Lahrer Hinkender Bote
- Alternative designations: A919 RD · 1919 FV; 1976 WM
- Minor planet category: main-belt · (outer) background

Orbital characteristics
- Epoch 31 May 2020 (JD 2459000.5)
- Uncertainty parameter 0
- Observation arc: 100.34 yr (36,649 d)
- Aphelion: 3.7546 AU
- Perihelion: 2.5844 AU
- Semi-major axis: 3.1695 AU
- Eccentricity: 0.1846
- Orbital period (sidereal): 5.64 yr (2,061 d)
- Mean anomaly: 331.19°
- Mean motion: 0° 10^{m} 28.92^{s} / day
- Inclination: 16.336°
- Longitude of ascending node: 204.91°
- Argument of perihelion: 70.912°

Physical characteristics
- Mean diameter: 55.312±0.200 km; 58.48±2.4 km; 60.71±0.97 km
- Synodic rotation period: 15.64±0.02 h (Note: Lightcurve plot of 921 Jovita, Palmer Divide Observatory, Brian Warner (2004): rotation period 15.64±0.02 hours with a brightness amplitude of 0.12±0.02 mag. Quality code of 3−. Summary figures at the LCDB.)
- Geometric albedo: 0.075±0.018; 0.0297±0.003; 0.028±0.001
- Spectral type: Caa (S3OS2-TH); Ch (S3OS2-BB)
- Absolute magnitude (H): 10.0

921 Jovita (prov. designation: A919 RD or 1919 FV) is a dark background asteroid, approximately 58 kilometers (36 miles) in diameter, located in the outer regions of the asteroid belt. It was discovered on 4 September 1919, by astronomer Karl Reinmuth at the Heidelberg-Königstuhl State Observatory in southwest Germany. The carbonaceous C-type asteroid (Ch) has a rotation period of 15.6 hours and is likely spherical in shape. It was named "Jovita", a common German female name unrelated to the discoverer's contemporaries, that was taken from the almanac Lahrer Hinkender Bote.

== Orbit and classification ==
Jovita is a non-family asteroid of the main belt's background population when applying the hierarchical clustering method to its proper orbital elements. It orbits the Sun in the outer asteroid belt at a distance of 2.6–3.8 AU once every 5 years and 8 months (2,061 days; semi-major axis of 3.17 AU). Its orbit has an eccentricity of 0.18 and an inclination of 16° with respect to the ecliptic. The body's observation arc begins at Heidelberg Observatory on 4 September 1919, the night after its official discovery observation.

== Naming ==
This minor planet was named "Jovita", after a female name picked from the Lahrer Hinkender Bote, published in Lahr, southern Germany. A Hinkender Bote (lit. "limping messenger") was a very popular almanac, especially in the alemannic-speaking region from the late 17th throughout the early 20th century. The calendar section contains feast days, the dates of important fairs and astronomical ephemerides. The German name day analogue is given next to the protestant and catholic feast days (entry not found).

=== Reinmuth's calendar names ===
As with 22 other asteroids – starting with 913 Otila, and ending with 1144 Oda – Reinmuth selected names from this calendar due to his many asteroid discoveries that he had trouble thinking of proper names. These names are not related to the discoverer's contemporaries. Lutz Schmadel, the author of the Dictionary of Minor Planet Names learned about Reinmuth's source of inspiration from private communications with Dutch astronomer Ingrid van Houten-Groeneveld, who worked as a young astronomer at Heidelberg.

== Physical characteristics ==
In the Tholen- and SMASS-like taxonomy of the Small Solar System Objects Spectroscopic Survey (S3OS2), Jovita is a hydrated, carbonaceous Caa and Ch-type asteroid, respectively.

=== Rotation period ===
In August 2004, a rotational lightcurve of Jovita was obtained from photometric observations by . Lightcurve analysis gave a rotation period of 15.64±0.02 hours with a brightness variation of 0.12±0.02 magnitude, indicative of a rather spherical shape (U=3−). A lower rated period determination of 23.00±0.07 hours with an amplitude of 0.07±0.01 magnitude was made by French amateur astronomers René Roy and Laurent Bernasconi in September 2004 (U=2).

=== Diameter and albedo ===
According to the survey carried out by the NEOWISE mission of NASA's Wide-field Infrared Survey Explorer (WISE), the Infrared Astronomical Satellite IRAS, and the Japanese Akari satellite, Jovita measures (55.312±0.200), (58.48±2.4) and (60.71±0.97) kilometers in diameter and its surface has a low albedo of (0.075±0.018), (0.0297±0.003) and (0.028±0.001), respectively. The Collaborative Asteroid Lightcurve Link assumes an albedo of 0.0670 and a diameter of 58.95 km based on an absolute magnitude of 9.7. Alternative mean-diameters published by the WISE team include (48.63±15.32 km), (52.82±14.64 km), (58.197±1.703 km) and (63.41±0.55 km) with albedos between 0.048 and 0.069. An asteroid occultation, observed on 5 February 2007, gave a best-fit ellipse dimension of 58.0 × 58.0 kilometers. These timed observations are taken when the asteroid passes in front of a distant star. However the quality of the measurement is rated poorly.
