= 942 Romilda =

Background asteroid

Discovery
- Discovered by: K. Reinmuth
- Discovery site: Heidelberg Obs.
- Discovery date: 11 October 1920

Designations
- Named after: Name picked from the almanac Lahrer Hinkender Bote
- Alternative designations: A920 TG · 1920 HW
- Minor planet category: main-belt · (outer) background

Orbital characteristics
- Epoch 31 May 2020 (JD 2459000.5)
- Uncertainty parameter 0
- Observation arc: 98.58 yr (36,006 d)
- Aphelion: 3.6988 AU
- Perihelion: 2.6321 AU
- Semi-major axis: 3.1655 AU
- Eccentricity: 0.1685
- Orbital period (sidereal): 5.63 yr (2,057 d)
- Mean anomaly: 258.14°
- Mean motion: 0° 10^{m} 30^{s} / day
- Inclination: 10.560°
- Longitude of ascending node: 71.342°
- Argument of perihelion: 319.36°

Physical characteristics
- Mean diameter: 35.97±1.75 km; 36.772±0.196 km
- Synodic rotation period: 6.965±0.003 h
- Geometric albedo: 0.108±0.012; 0.121±0.026
- Spectral type: C (assumed)
- Absolute magnitude (H): 11.0

942 Romilda (prov. designation: A920 TG or 1920 HW) is a background asteroid, approximately 36 kilometers (22 miles) in diameter, located in the outer region of the asteroid belt. It was discovered by German astronomer Karl Reinmuth at the Heidelberg Observatory on 11 October 1920. The assumed C-type asteroid has a rotation period of 6.97 hours. It was named "Romilda", a common German female name unrelated to the discoverer's contemporaries, that was taken from the almanac Lahrer Hinkender Bote.

== Orbit and classification ==
Romilda is a non-family asteroid of the main belt's background population when applying the hierarchical clustering method to its proper orbital elements. It orbits the Sun in the outer asteroid belt at a distance of 2.6–3.7 AU once every 5 years and 8 months (2,057 days; semi-major axis of 3.17 AU). Its orbit has an eccentricity of 0.17 and an inclination of 11° with respect to the ecliptic.

== Discovery ==
On 11 October 1920, Romilda was discovered by Karl Reinmuth at the Heidelberg-Königstuhl State Observatory in southwest Germany. On the same night, German astronomer Arnold Schwassmann independently discovered the asteroid at the Bergedorf Observatory in Hamburg. However, the Minor Planet Center only credits Reinmuth as official discoverer. The body's observation arc begins at Heidelberg Observatory on 21 October 1920, the night after its official discovery observation.

== Naming ==
This minor planet was named "Romilda", after a female name picked from the Lahrer Hinkender Bote, published in Lahr, southern Germany. A Hinkender Bote (lit. "limping messenger") was a very popular almanac, especially in the alemannic-speaking region from the late 17th throughout the early 20th century. The calendar section contains feast and name days, the dates of important fairs and astronomical ephemerides. For 25 March, the calendar gives "Romilda" as the German analogue next to the catholic and protestant feast days (The Annunciation to the Blessed Virgin Mary; German: Mariä Verkündigung).

=== Reinmuth's calendar names ===
As with 22 other asteroids – starting with 913 Otila, and ending with 1144 Oda – Reinmuth selected names from this calendar due to his many asteroid discoveries that he had trouble thinking of proper names. These names are not related to the discoverer's contemporaries. Lutz Schmadel, the author of the Dictionary of Minor Planet Names learned about Reinmuth's source of inspiration from private communications with Dutch astronomer Ingrid van Houten-Groeneveld, who worked as a young astronomer at Heidelberg.

== Physical characteristics ==
Romilda is an assumed carbonaceous C-type asteroid.

=== Rotation period ===
In December 2005, a rotational lightcurve of Romilda was obtained from photometric observations over seven nights by Walter Cooney at the Blackberry Observatory (929) in Louisiana. Lightcurve analysis gave a rotation period of 6.965±0.003 hours with a brightness variation of 0.35±0.05 magnitude (U=3). In January 2006, Italian astronomers Roberto Crippa and Federico Manzini at the Sozzago Astronomical Station (A12) determined a nearly identical period of 6.9659±0.0004 hours with an amplitude of 0.26±0.01 magnitude (U=2).

=== Diameter and albedo ===
According to the surveys carried out by the Japanese Akari satellite and the NEOWISE mission of NASA's Wide-field Infrared Survey Explorer (WISE), Romilda measures (35.97±1.75) and (36.772±0.196) kilometers in diameter, and its surface has an albedo of (0.108±0.012) and (0.121±0.026), respectively. The Collaborative Asteroid Lightcurve Link assumes a standard albedo for a carbonaceous asteroid of 0.057 and calculates a diameter of 35.12 km based on an absolute magnitude of 11. Further published mean-diameters and albedos by the WISE team include (29.756±8.321 km), (33.86±7.45 km), (37.12±0.27 km), and (40.832±0.392 km) with corresponding albedos of (0.0521±0.0541), (0.06±0.03), (0.056±0.006), and (0.0804±0.0074).
