= 924 Toni =

Large background asteroid

Discovery
- Discovered by: K. Reinmuth
- Discovery site: Heidelberg Obs.
- Discovery date: 20 October 1919

Designations
- Named after: Name picked from the almanac Lahrer Hinkender Bote
- Alternative designations: A919 UF · 1919 GC; A906 BA · 1906 BA; A914 UD · 1914 UD
- Minor planet category: main-belt · (outer) background

Orbital characteristics
- Epoch 31 May 2020 (JD 2459000.5)
- Uncertainty parameter 0
- Observation arc: 113.78 yr (41,557 d)
- Aphelion: 3.3879 AU
- Perihelion: 2.4888 AU
- Semi-major axis: 2.9383 AU
- Eccentricity: 0.1530
- Orbital period (sidereal): 5.04 yr (1,840 d)
- Mean anomaly: 355.92°
- Mean motion: 0° 11^{m} 44.52^{s} / day
- Inclination: 8.9872°
- Longitude of ascending node: 150.19°
- Argument of perihelion: 219.96°

Physical characteristics
- Mean diameter: 71.983±25.283 km; 78.33±1.34 km; 85.49±2.5 km
- Synodic rotation period: 19.437±0.001 h (Note: Lightcurve plot of (924) Toni by Frederick Pilcher at the Organ Mesa Observatory (2014) rotation period 19.437±0.001 hours. Quality code of 3. Summary figures at the LCDB and at the Lightcurves-Section of the Astronomical Society of Las Cruces.)
- Geometric albedo: 0.0432±0.003; 0.052±0.007; 0.054±0.002
- Spectral type: Tholen = CX; SMASS = X; B–V = 0.720±0.010; U–B = 0.340±0.020; V–R = 0.424±0.011
- Absolute magnitude (H): 9.4

924 Toni (prov. designation: A919 UF or 1919 GC) is a large background asteroid, approximately 80 kilometers (50 miles) in diameter, from the outer regions of the asteroid belt. It was discovered on 20 October 1919, by German astronomer Karl Reinmuth at the Heidelberg-Königstuhl State Observatory. The X-type asteroid has a rotation period of 19.4 hours. It was named "Toni", a common German female name unrelated to the discoverer's contemporaries, that was taken from the almanac Lahrer Hinkender Bote.

== Orbit and classification ==
Toni is a non-family asteroid of the main belt's background population when applying the hierarchical clustering method to its proper orbital elements. It orbits the Sun in the outer asteroid belt at a distance of 2.5–3.4 AU once every 5.04 years (1,840 days; semi-major axis of 2.94 AU). Its orbit has an eccentricity of 0.15 and an inclination of 9° with respect to the ecliptic. The asteroid was first observed as A906 BA (1906 BA) at Heidelberg Observatory on 20 January 1906, where the body's observation arc begins two days later on 20 January 1906, more than 13 years prior its official discovery observation.

== Naming ==
This minor planet was named "Toni", after a female name picked from the Lahrer Hinkender Bote, published in Lahr, southern Germany. A Hinkender Bote (lit. "limping messenger") was a very popular almanac, especially in the alemannic-speaking region from the late 17th throughout the early 20th century. The calendar section contains feast days, the dates of important fairs and astronomical ephemerides. The German name day analogue is given next to the protestant and catholic entries in the calendar of saints (entry not found).

=== Reinmuth's calendar names ===
As with 22 other asteroids – starting with 913 Otila, and ending with 1144 Oda – Reinmuth selected names from this calendar due to his many asteroid discoveries that he had trouble thinking of proper names. These names are not related to the discoverer's contemporaries. Lutz Schmadel, the author of the Dictionary of Minor Planet Names learned about Reinmuth's source of inspiration from private communications with Dutch astronomer Ingrid van Houten-Groeneveld, who worked as a young astronomer at Heidelberg.

== Physical characteristics ==
In the Bus–Binzel SMASS classification, Toni is an X-type asteroid, while in the Tholen classification, it is closest to a common, carbonaceous C-type asteroid and somewhat similar to an X-type (CX).

=== Rotation period ===
In July 2014, a rotational lightcurve of Toni was obtained from photometric observations by Frederick Pilcher at the Organ Mesa Observatory (G50) in New Mexico. Lightcurve analysis gave a well-defined rotation period of 19.437±0.001 hours with a brightness amplitude of 0.24±0.02 magnitude (U=3). This result supersedes previous observations with tentative period determinations by French amateur astronomers René Roy and Laurent Bernasconi (U=1/1).

=== Diameter and albedo ===
According to the survey carried out by the NEOWISE mission of NASA's Wide-field Infrared Survey Explorer (WISE), the Japanese Akari satellite, and the Infrared Astronomical Satellite IRAS, Toni measures (71.983±25.283), (78.33±1.34) and (85.49±2.5) kilometers in diameter and its surface has a low albedo of (0.052±0.007), (0.054±0.002) and (0.0432±0.003), respectively. The Collaborative Asteroid Lightcurve Link adopts the results obtained by IRAS, that is, an albedo of 0.0432 and a diameter of 85.49 km based on an absolute magnitude of 9.37. Further published mean-diameters and albedos by the WISE team include (84.874±26.15 km) and (94.58±0.38 km) and albedos of (0.0460±0.0477) and (0.04±0.01).
