= 928 Hildrun =

Dark background asteroid

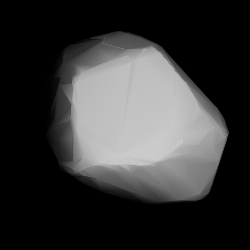
- Modelled shape of Hildrun from its lightcurve

Discovery
- Discovered by: K. Reinmuth
- Discovery site: Heidelberg Obs.
- Discovery date: 23 February 1920

Designations
- Named after: Name picked from the almanac Lahrer Hinkender Bote
- Alternative designations: A920 DC · 1920 GP; 1959 EE_{1}
- Minor planet category: main-belt · (outer) background

Orbital characteristics
- Epoch 31 May 2020 (JD 2459000.5)
- Uncertainty parameter 0
- Observation arc: 99.79 yr (36,447 d)
- Aphelion: 3.5999 AU
- Perihelion: 2.6698 AU
- Semi-major axis: 3.1349 AU
- Eccentricity: 0.1484
- Orbital period (sidereal): 5.55 yr (2,027 d)
- Mean anomaly: 9.2453°
- Mean motion: 0° 10^{m} 39.36^{s} / day
- Inclination: 17.653°
- Longitude of ascending node: 129.83°
- Argument of perihelion: 21.894°

Physical characteristics
- Mean diameter: 62.817±0.293 km; 64.04±1.09 km; 66.49±1.7 km
- Synodic rotation period: 14.13±0.03 h (Note: Lightcurve plot of (928) Hildrun, Palmer Divide Observatory, Brian Warner (2004). Rotation period 14.13±0.03 hours with a brightness amplitude of 0.34±0.02 mag. Quality code of 3. Summary figures at the LCDB.)
- Pole ecliptic latitude: (247.0°, −29.0°) (λ_{1}/β_{1}); (86.0°, −63.0°) (λ_{2}/β_{2})
- Geometric albedo: 0.0365±0.002 0.040±0.001; 0.043±0.007
- Spectral type: X (S3OS2)
- Absolute magnitude (H): 10.0

928 Hildrun (prov. designation: A920 DC or 1920 GP), is a dark background asteroid, approximately 64 kilometers (40 miles) in diameter, located in the outer region of the asteroid belt. It was discovered on 23 February 1920, by astronomer Karl Reinmuth at the Heidelberg-Königstuhl State Observatory in southwest Germany. The X-type asteroid has a rotation period of 14.1 hours. It was named "Hildrun", a common German female name unrelated to the discoverer's contemporaries, that was taken from the almanac Lahrer Hinkender Bote.

== Orbit and classification ==
Hildrun is a non-family asteroid of the main belt's background population when applying the hierarchical clustering method to its proper orbital elements. It orbits the Sun in the outer asteroid belt (IIIb) at a distance of 2.7–3.6 AU once every 5 years and 7 months (2,027 days; semi-major axis of 3.13 AU). Its orbit has an eccentricity of 0.15 and an inclination of 18° with respect to the ecliptic. The body's observation arc begins at Heidelberg Observatory on 24 February 1920, the night after its official discovery observation.

== Naming ==
This minor planet was named "Hildrun", after a female name picked from the Lahrer Hinkender Bote, published in Lahr, southern Germany. A Hinkender Bote (lit. "limping messenger") was a very popular almanac, especially in the alemannic-speaking region from the late 17th throughout the early 20th century. The calendar section contains feast days, the dates of important fairs and astronomical ephemerides. For 19 May, the calendar gives "Hildrun" as the German name day analogue next to Potentia and Peter Cöl., the protestant and catholic entries in the calendar of saints, likely referring to Pudentiana and Pope Celestine V.

=== Reinmuth's calendar names ===
As with 22 other asteroids – starting with 913 Otila, and ending with 1144 Oda – Reinmuth selected names from this calendar due to his many asteroid discoveries that he had trouble thinking of proper names. These names are not related to the discoverer's contemporaries. Lutz Schmadel, the author of the Dictionary of Minor Planet Names learned about Reinmuth's source of inspiration from private communications with Dutch astronomer Ingrid van Houten-Groeneveld, who worked as a young astronomer at Heidelberg.

== Physical characteristics ==
In both the Tholen- and SMASS-like taxonomy of the Small Solar System Objects Spectroscopic Survey (S3OS2), Hildrun is an X-type asteroid.

=== Rotation period and poles ===
In May 2004, a rotational lightcurve of Hildrun was obtained from photometric observations by Brian Warner at the Palmer Divide Observatory (716) in Colorado. Lightcurve analysis gave a rotation period of 14.13±0.03 hours with a brightness variation of 0.34±0.02 magnitude (U=3).

Two tentative lightcurves were obtained by Pierre Antonini in June 2010, and by Robin Esseiva, Nicolas Esseiva and Raoul Behrend in April 2015; both with a period of 14.4±0.5 hours and an amplitude of 0.27±0.05 and 0.25±0.10 magnitude, respectively (U=2-/2-). In 2016, a modeled lightcurves using photometric data from various sources, rendered a concurring sidereal period of 14.1163±0.0005 hours and two spin axes of (247.0°, −29.0°) and (86.0°, −63.0°) in ecliptic coordinates.

=== Diameter and albedo ===
According to the survey carried out by the NEOWISE mission of NASA's Wide-field Infrared Survey Explorer, the Japanese Akari satellite, and the Infrared Astronomical Satellite IRAS, Hildrun measures (62.817±0.293), (64.04±1.09) and (66.49±1.7) kilometers in diameter and its surface has an albedo of (0.043±0.007), (0.040±0.001) and (0.0365±0.002), respectively. The Collaborative Asteroid Lightcurve Link derives an albedo of 0.0437 and a diameter of 66.59 km based on an absolute magnitude of 9.9. Further published mean-diameters and albedos by the WISE team include (56.81±13.02 km), (60.559±0.798 km) and (64.517±1.054 km) with corresponding albedos of (0.06±0.06), (0.053±0.007) and (0.0387±0.0054).
