= 938 Chlosinde =

Carbonaceous Themistian asteroid

Discovery
- Discovered by: K. Reinmuth
- Discovery site: Heidelberg Obs.
- Discovery date: 9 September 1920

Designations
- Named after: Name picked from the almanac Lahrer Hinkender Bote
- Alternative designations: A920 RC · 1948 RJ; 1920 HQ
- Minor planet category: main-belt · (outer); Themis

Orbital characteristics
- Epoch 31 May 2020 (JD 2459000.5)
- Uncertainty parameter 0
- Observation arc: 99.32 yr (36,278 d)
- Aphelion: 3.7644 AU
- Perihelion: 2.5322 AU
- Semi-major axis: 3.1483 AU
- Eccentricity: 0.1957
- Orbital period (sidereal): 5.59 yr (2,040 d)
- Mean anomaly: 265.87°
- Mean motion: 0° 10^{m} 35.04^{s} / day
- Inclination: 2.6698°
- Longitude of ascending node: 119.07°
- Argument of perihelion: 225.87°

Physical characteristics
- Mean diameter: 23.70±1.62 km; 26.79±2.5 km; 33.466±0.164 km
- Synodic rotation period: 13.702±0.003 h; 19.204±0.006 h
- Geometric albedo: 0.069±0.029; 0.1178±0.025; 0.151±0.022
- Spectral type: C (SDSS-MOC)
- Absolute magnitude (H): 11.3

938 Chlosinde (prov. designation: A920 RC or 1920 HQ) is a carbonaceous Themistian asteroid, approximately 33 kilometers (21 miles) in diameter, from the outer regions of the asteroid belt. It was discovered by astronomer Karl Reinmuth at the Heidelberg Observatory in southwest Germany on 9 September 1920. The C-type asteroid has an ambiguous rotation period of 13.7 or 19.2 hours. It was named "Chlosinde", a common German female name unrelated to the discoverer's contemporaries, that was taken from the almanac Lahrer Hinkender Bote.

== Orbit and classification ==
When applying the hierarchical clustering method to its proper orbital elements, Chlosinde is a core member of the Themis family (602), a very large family of carbonaceous asteroids, named after 24 Themis. It orbits the Sun in the outer asteroid belt at a distance of 2.5–3.8 AU once every 5 years and 7 months (2,040 days; semi-major axis of 3.15 AU). Its orbit has an eccentricity of 0.20 and an inclination of 3° with respect to the ecliptic. The body's observation arc begins at Heidelberg Observatory on 10 September 1920, the night after its official discovery observation.

== Naming ==
This minor planet was named "Chlosinde", after a female name picked from the Lahrer Hinkender Bote, published in Lahr, southern Germany. A Hinkender Bote (lit. "limping messenger") was a very popular almanac, especially in the alemannic-speaking region from the late 17th throughout the early 20th century. The calendar section contains feast days, the dates of important fairs and astronomical ephemerides. For 21 June, the calendar gives "Chlosinde" as the German name day analogue next to Albanus and Aloisius, the protestant and catholic entries in the calendar of saints, likely referring to Saint Alban and Aloysius Gonzaga.

=== Reinmuth's calendar names ===
As with 22 other asteroids – starting with 913 Otila, and ending with 1144 Oda – Reinmuth selected names from this calendar due to his many asteroid discoveries that he had trouble thinking of proper names. These names are not related to the discoverer's contemporaries. Lutz Schmadel, the author of the Dictionary of Minor Planet Names learned about Reinmuth's source of inspiration from private communications with Dutch astronomer Ingrid van Houten-Groeneveld, who worked as a young astronomer at Heidelberg.

== Physical characteristics ==
In the SDSS-based taxonomy, Chlosinde is a carbonaceous C-type asteroid, which agrees with the Themis family's overall spectral type.

=== Rotation period ===
In August 2010, a rotational lightcurve of Chlosinde was obtained from photometric observations by Robert Stephens at the Santana Observatory (646) and Goat Mountain Astronomical Research Station (G79) in California. Lightcurve analysis gave a rotation period of 19.204±0.006 hours with a low brightness variation of 0.16±0.03 magnitude, indicative of a rather spherical shape (U=2). However the result is ambiguous with an alternative period solution of 13.72 hours. In September 2010, Larry Owings determined at period of 13.702±0.003 hours with an amplitude of 0.12±0.01 magnitude at the Barnes Ridge Observatory in California (U=2).

=== Diameter and albedo ===
According to the survey carried out by the Japanese Akari satellite, the Infrared Astronomical Satellite IRAS, and the NEOWISE mission of NASA's Wide-field Infrared Survey Explorer, Chlosinde measures (23.70±1.62), (26.79±2.5) and (33.466±0.164) kilometers in diameter and its surface has an albedo of (0.151±0.022), (0.1178±0.025) and (0.069±0.029), respectively.

The Collaborative Asteroid Lightcurve Link derives an albedo of 0.0756 and a diameter of 26.56 km based on an absolute magnitude of 11.3. Further published mean-diameters and albedos by the WISE team include (27.255±6.661 km), (33.97±0.32 km), and (36.146±0.366 km) with corresponding albedos of (0.0565±0.0310), (0.046±0.009), and (0.0647±0.0112).
