= 936 Kunigunde =

Dark Themistian asteroid

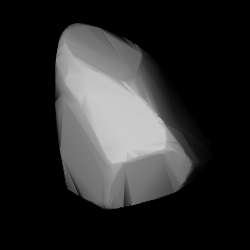
- Modelled shape of Kunigunde from its light curve

Discovery
- Discovered by: K. Reinmuth
- Discovery site: Heidelberg Obs.
- Discovery date: 8 September 1920

Designations
- Named after: Name picked from the almanac Lahrer Hinkender Bote
- Alternative designations: A920 RB · 1930 KD; 1930 KR · 1931 TO_{2} 1942 RD_{1} · 1984 BK_{7} A913 HA · A921 WD; 1920 HN · 1913 HA
- Minor planet category: main-belt · (outer); Themis

Orbital characteristics
- Epoch 31 May 2020 (JD 2459000.5)
- Uncertainty parameter 0
- Observation arc: 98.95 yr (36,140 d)
- Aphelion: 3.6843 AU
- Perihelion: 2.5802 AU
- Semi-major axis: 3.1323 AU
- Eccentricity: 0.1762
- Orbital period (sidereal): 5.54 yr (2,025 d)
- Mean anomaly: 8.7542°
- Mean motion: 0° 10^{m} 40.08^{s} / day
- Inclination: 2.3660°
- Longitude of ascending node: 62.161°
- Argument of perihelion: 253.49°

Physical characteristics
- Mean diameter: 38.08±0.94 km; 39.56±1.2 km; 43.227±1.035 km
- Synodic rotation period: 9.3650±0.0006 h
- Pole ecliptic latitude: (47.0°, 57.0°) (λ_{1}/β_{1}); (234.0°, 50.0°) (λ_{2}/β_{2})
- Geometric albedo: 0.065±0.014; 0.1129±0.007; 0.124±0.007
- Spectral type: B (S3OS2)
- Absolute magnitude (H): 10.4

936 Kunigunde (prov. designation: A920 RB or 1920 HN) is a dark Themistian asteroid from the outer regions of the asteroid belt, approximately 40 kilometers (25 miles) in diameter. It was discovered on 8 September 1920, by German astronomer Karl Reinmuth at the Heidelberg-Königstuhl State Observatory. The carbonaceous B-type asteroid has a rotation period of 9.4 hours. It was named "Kunigunde", a common German female name unrelated to the discoverer's contemporaries, that was taken from the almanac Lahrer Hinkender Bote.

== Orbit and classification ==
Kunigunde is a core member of the Themis family (602), when applying the hierarchical clustering method to its proper orbital elements. The very large family of carbonaceous asteroids is named after 24 Themis. Kunigunde orbits the Sun in the outer main-belt at a distance of 2.6–3.7 AU once every 5 years and 6 months (2,025 days; semi-major axis of 3.13 AU). Its orbit has an eccentricity of 0.18 and an inclination of 2° with respect to the ecliptic. The asteroid was first observed as A913 HA (1913 HA) at Simeiz Observatory on 27 April 1913. The body's observation arc begins at Heidelberg with its official discovery observation on 8 September 1920.

== Naming ==
This minor planet was named "Kunigunde", after a female name picked from the Lahrer Hinkender Bote, published in Lahr, southern Germany. A Hinkender Bote (lit. "limping messenger") was a very popular almanac, especially in the Alemannic-speaking region from the late 17th throughout the early 20th centuries. The calendar section contains feast days, the dates of important fairs and astronomical ephemerides. For 3 March, the calendar gives "Kunigund" as the German name day analogue next to Kunigunde and Titian, the protestant and catholic entries in the calendar of saints, likely referring to Cunigunde of Luxembourg and Titian of Brescia.

=== Reinmuth's calendar names ===
As with 22 other asteroids—starting with 913 Otila, and ending with 1144 Oda—Reinmuth selected names from this calendar due to his many asteroid discoveries for which he had trouble thinking of proper names. These names are not related to the discoverer's contemporaries. Lutz Schmadel, the author of the Dictionary of Minor Planet Names learned about Reinmuth's source of inspiration from private communications with Dutch astronomer Ingrid van Houten-Groeneveld, who worked as a young astronomer at Heidelberg.

== Physical characteristics ==
In both the Tholen- and SMASS-like taxonomy of the Small Solar System Objects Spectroscopic Survey (S3OS2), Kunigunde is a B-type asteroid, a somewhat brighter spectral type than the common C type typical for Themistian asteroids.

=== Rotation period and poles ===
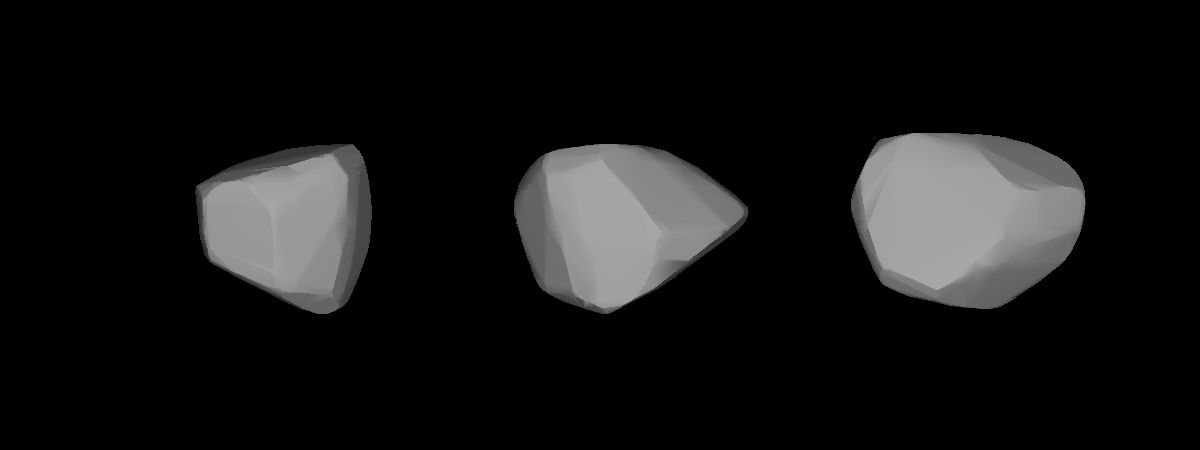
3D model of Kunigunde based on its light curve

In March 2018, a rotational light curve of Kunigunde was obtained from photometric observations by French amateur astronomer René Roy. Light-curve analysis gave a well-defined rotation period of 9.3650±0.0006 hours with a brightness variation of 0.34±0.01 magnitude (U=3). Richard Ditteon at the Oakley Southern Sky Observatory (E09) determined a period of 8.82±0.02 with an amplitude of 0.30±0.05 magnitude (U=2). Photometry by Angeli and Guimarães at observatories in Brazil and Argentina gave a similar period of 8.80 hours (U=2). In 2013, an international study modeled a light curve with a sidereal period of 8.82653 hours and found two spin axes at (47.0°, 57.0°) and (234.0°, 50.0°) in ecliptic coordinates (λ, β) (U=n.a.).

=== Diameter and albedo ===
According to the survey carried out by the Japanese Akari satellite, the Infrared Astronomical Satellite IRAS, and the NEOWISE mission of NASA's Wide-field Infrared Survey Explorer, Kunigunde measures (38.08±0.94), (39.56±1.2) and (43.227±1.035) kilometers in diameter and its surface has an albedo of (0.124±0.007), (0.1129±0.007) and (0.065±0.014), respectively.

The Collaborative Asteroid Lightcurve Link derives an albedo of 0.0792 and a diameter of 39.29 kilometers based on an absolute magnitude of 10.4. Further published mean-diameters and albedos by the WISE team include (28.81±9.81 km) and (36.39±10.33 km) with corresponding albedos of (0.10±0.07) and (0.07±0.07). An asteroid occultation on 21 November 2004, gave a best-fit ellipse dimension of 39.0 × 39.0 km. These timed observations are taken when the asteroid passes in front of a distant star. However, the quality of the measurement is poorly rated.
