= 997 Priska =

Main-belt asteroid

Discovery
- Discovered by: K. Reinmuth
- Discovery site: Heidelberg Obs.
- Discovery date: 12 July 1923

Designations
- Pronunciation: /ˈprɪskə/
- Named after: A girl's name picked from a popular German calendar
- Alternative designations: 1923 NR · 1959 WA; 1967 RN
- Minor planet category: main-belt · (middle); Adeona

Orbital characteristics
- Epoch 4 September 2017 (JD 2458000.5)
- Uncertainty parameter 0
- Observation arc: 93.71 yr (34,229 days)
- Aphelion: 3.1568 AU
- Perihelion: 2.1787 AU
- Semi-major axis: 2.6677 AU
- Eccentricity: 0.1833
- Orbital period (sidereal): 4.36 yr (1,592 days)
- Mean anomaly: 206.91°
- Mean motion: 0° 13^{m} 34.32^{s} / day
- Inclination: 10.508°
- Longitude of ascending node: 247.11°
- Argument of perihelion: 51.494°

Physical characteristics
- Dimensions: 16.71±0.31 km 18.20±0.28 km 18.59 km (derived); 18.60±5.07 km 18.70±1.6 km 19.45±1.99 km 20.274±0.123 km 20.391±0.119 km
- Synodic rotation period: 16.22±0.01 h
- Geometric albedo: 0.037±0.014; 0.04±0.02; 0.05±0.04; 0.0511 (derived); 0.054±0.009; 0.0572±0.0004; 0.0801±0.016; 0.088±0.003
- Spectral type: SMASS = Ch
- Absolute magnitude (H): 12.00 · 12.31±0.29 · 12.40 · 12.5 · 12.51 · 13.07

997 Priska, provisional designation 1923 NR, is a carbonaceous Adeonian asteroid from the central regions of the asteroid belt, approximately 19 kilometers in diameter. It was discovered on 12 July 1923, by astronomer Karl Reinmuth at the Heidelberg-Königstuhl State Observatory in southwest Germany. The asteroid's name is a common German female name, unrelated to the discoverer's contemporaries.

== Orbit and classification ==
Priska is a member of the Adeona family (505), a large family of carbonaceous asteroids in the central main belt, named after 145 Adeona. It orbits the Sun at a distance of 2.2–3.2 AU once every 4 years and 4 months (1,592 days). Its orbit has an eccentricity of 0.18 and an inclination of 11° with respect to the ecliptic.

The body's observation arc begins with its official discovery observation at Heidelberg.

== Physical characteristics ==
In the SMASS classification, Priska is a Ch-subtype, a hydrated carbonaceous C-type asteroid.

=== Rotation period ===
In August 2006, a rotational lightcurve of Priska was obtained from photometric observations by Italian amateur astronomers Roberto Crippa and Federico Manzini. Lightcurve analysis gave a rotation period of 16.22 hours with a brightness amplitude of 0.61 magnitude (U=2). A high brightness variation is typically indicative for an elongated rather than spherical shape.

=== Diameter and albedo ===
According to the surveys carried out by the Infrared Astronomical Satellite IRAS, the Japanese Akari satellite and the NEOWISE mission of NASA's Wide-field Infrared Survey Explorer, Priska measures between 16.71 and 20.391 kilometers in diameter and its surface has an albedo between 0.037 and 0.088.

The Collaborative Asteroid Lightcurve Link derives an albedo of 0.0511 and a diameter of 18.59 kilometers based on an absolute magnitude of 12.5.

== Naming ==
This minor planet was named after a girl's name picked from the German popular calendar Der Lahrer hinkende Bote.^{(de)}

=== Reinmuth's Calendar Girls ===
As with 913 Otila and 1144 Oda, Reinmuth selected names from this calendar due to his many asteroid discoveries that he had trouble thinking of proper names. These names are not related to the discoverer's contemporaries. The author of the Dictionary of Minor Planet Names learned about Reinmuth's source of inspiration from private communications with Dutch astronomer Ingrid van Houten-Groeneveld, who worked as a young astronomer at Heidelberg.
