= 839 Valborg =

Main-belt asteroid

Discovery
- Discovered by: Max Wolf
- Discovery site: Heidelberg
- Discovery date: 24 September 1916

Designations
- Alternative designations: 1916 AJ; 1948 CF; 1952 BW1; 1954 UH1

Orbital characteristics
- Epoch 31 July 2016 (JD 2457600.5)
- Uncertainty parameter 0
- Observation arc: 95.57 yr (34908 d)
- Aphelion: 3.0122 AU (450.62 Gm)
- Perihelion: 2.2193 AU (332.00 Gm)
- Semi-major axis: 2.6158 AU (391.32 Gm)
- Eccentricity: 0.15157
- Orbital period (sidereal): 4.23 yr (1545.2 d)
- Mean anomaly: 263.01°
- Mean motion: 0° 13^{m} 58.692^{s} / day
- Inclination: 12.605°
- Longitude of ascending node: 338.211°
- Argument of perihelion: 339.558°
- Earth MOID: 1.21054 AU (181.094 Gm)
- Jupiter MOID: 2.32416 AU (347.689 Gm)
- T_{Jupiter}: 3.357

Physical characteristics
- Mean radius: 10.195±0.4 km
- Synodic rotation period: 10.366 h (0.4319 d)
- Geometric albedo: 0.3534±0.028
- Absolute magnitude (H): 10.6

839 Valborg is a mid-sized S-type Eunomian asteroid. Its diameter is about 20 km, its albedo of 0.353 is very high for an asteroid. Its rotation period is 10.366 hours.
