= Zoran Knežević (astronomer) =

Serbian astronomer

Minor planets discovered: 1
3176 Paolicchi	13 November 1980	list

Zoran Knežević (Serbian Cyrillic: Зоран Кнежевић; born 23 August 1949 in Osijek) is a Serbian astronomer, who has been publishing since 1982. He is the current president of the Serbian Academy of Sciences and Arts (SANU) since 2023. His major scientific contributions are in the field of movement of small Solar System bodies, their proper elements and perturbations, as well as the identification and evolution of asteroid families. As of 2002, he is the director of Astronomical Observatory of Belgrade and the president of Serbian National Astronomy Committee.

== Awards and honors ==
Asteroid 3900 Knežević, discovered by Edward Bowell, is named after him. The official naming citation was published by the Minor Planet Center on 23 December 1988 (M.P.C. 14030).

== See also ==
- List of minor planet discoverers § Z. Knezevic
- Vincenzo Zappalà
