= Vincenzo Zappalà =

Italian astronomer

Minor planets discovered: 9
see § List of discovered minor planets

Vincenzo Zappalà (born 1945) is an Italian astronomer and discoverer of several main-belt asteroids.

He is credited by the Minor Planet Center with the discovered of 9 minor planets. All of his discoveries he made at ESO's Chilean La Silla Observatory in 1984, with the exception of 17357 Lucataliano, which he discovered at Mount Stromlo Observatory in 1978. He has also been a long-term astronomer at the Observatory of Turin in Pino Torinese.

== Awards and honors ==
The main-belt asteroid 2813 Zappalà, discovered by American astronomer Edward Bowell at the U.S. Anderson Mesa Station in 1981, is named in his honour.

== List of discovered minor planets ==
4478 Blanco	23 April 1984	list^{[A]}
5802 Casteldelpiano	27 April 1984	list
6289 Lanusei	28 April 1984	list^{[A]}
7459 Gilbertofranco	28 April 1984	list
9009 Tirso	23 April 1984	list

9010 Candelo	27 April 1984	list
10038 Tanaro	28 April 1984	list
11476 Stefanosimoni	23 April 1984	list
17357 Lucataliano	23 August 1978	list^{[B]}
Co-discovery with: ^{A} W. Ferreri and ^{B} G. DeSanctis

== See also ==
- List of minor planet discoverers § V. Zappala
- Zoran Knežević (astronomer)
