= 913 Otila =

Asteroid in the inner regions of the asteroid belt

Discovery
- Discovered by: K. Reinmuth
- Discovery site: Heidelberg Obs.
- Discovery date: 19 May 1919

Designations
- Named after: Name picked from the almanac Lahrer Hinkender Bote
- Alternative designations: A919 KD · 1935 ES; 1942 NB · 1955 LB; A909 HD · 1909 HD; 1919 FL
- Minor planet category: main-belt · (inner); Flora · Bg

Orbital characteristics
- Epoch 31 May 2020 (JD 2459000.5)
- Uncertainty parameter 0
- Observation arc: 110.78 yr (40,464 d)
- Aphelion: 2.5728 AU
- Perihelion: 1.8219 AU
- Semi-major axis: 2.1973 AU
- Eccentricity: 0.1709
- Orbital period (sidereal): 3.26 yr (1,190 d)
- Mean anomaly: 329.43°
- Mean motion: 0° 18^{m} 9.36^{s} / day
- Inclination: 5.8059°
- Longitude of ascending node: 94.928°
- Argument of perihelion: 188.68°

Physical characteristics
- Mean diameter: 11.32±0.45 km; 11.636±0.240 km
- Synodic rotation period: 4.8720±0.0002 h
- Geometric albedo: 0.245±0.021; 0.282±0.057
- Spectral type: SMASS = Sa; Sw (Bus–DeMeo)
- Absolute magnitude (H): 12.0

913 Otila (prov. designation: A919 KD or 1919 FL) is a bright Flora asteroid from the inner regions of the asteroid belt. It was discovered by German astronomer Karl Reinmuth at the Heidelberg Observatory on 19 May 1919. The stony S-type asteroid has a short rotation period of 4.9 hours and measures approximately 12 kilometers (7.5 miles) in diameter. It was named after a common German female name unrelated to the discoverer's contemporaries, that was taken from the almanac Lahrer Hinkender Bote.

== Orbit and classification ==
When applying the synthetic hierarchical clustering method (HCM) by Nesvorný, or the 1995 HCM-analysis by Zappalà, Otila is a member of the Flora family (402), a giant asteroid family and the largest family of stony asteroids in the main-belt. However, according to another HCM-analysis by Milani and Knežević (AstDys), it is a background asteroid as this analysis does not recognize the Flora asteroid clan. Otila orbits the Sun in the inner main-belt at a distance of 1.8–2.6 AU once every 3 years and 3 months (1,190 days; semi-major axis of 2.2 AU). Its orbit has an eccentricity of 0.17 and an inclination of 6° with respect to the ecliptic. The body's observation arc begins with its first observation as A909 HD (1909 HD) at Heidelberg Observatory in April 1909, more than 10 year prior to its official discovery observation.

== Naming ==
This minor planet was named "Otila", after a female name picked from the Lahrer Hinkender Bote, published in Lahr, southern Germany. A Hinkender Bote (lit. "limping messenger") was a very popular almanac, especially in the alemannic-speaking region from the late 17th throughout the early 20th century. The calendar section contains feast days, the dates of important fairs and astronomical ephemerides. For 26 February, the calendar gives "Otila" as the German name day analogue next to Hestor and Alexander, the protestant and catholic entries in the calendar of saints, latter likely referring to Pope Alexander I of Alexandria, whose feast day is also 26 February.

=== Reinmuth's calendar names ===
Otila is the first in a series of 23 asteroids – ending with 1144 Oda – for which Reinmuth used the Lahrer Hinkender Bote to select names from, as he had trouble thinking of proper names due to his many asteroid discoveries. These names are not related to the discoverer's contemporaries. Lutz Schmadel, the author of the Dictionary of Minor Planet Names learned about Reinmuth's source of inspiration from private communications with Dutch astronomer Ingrid van Houten-Groeneveld, who worked as a young astronomer at Heidelberg.

== Physical characteristics ==
In the Bus–Binzel SMASS classification, Otila is an Sa-subtype that transitions from a common, stony S-type to an uncommon A-type asteroid, while in the Bus-DeMeo-taxonomy, it is an Sw-type asteroid, where the "w" notation is used for a objects with a high spectral slope (greater than 0.25).

=== Rotation period ===
In April 2007, a rotational lightcurve of Otila was obtained from photometric observations by Julian Oey. Lightcurve analysis gave a rotation period of 4.8720±0.0002 hours with a brightness amplitude of 0.22±0.02 magnitude (U=3).

=== Diameter and albedo ===
According to the survey carried out by the Japanese Akari satellite and the NEOWISE mission of NASA's Wide-field Infrared Survey Explorer (WISE), Otila measures (11.32±0.45) and (11.636±0.240) kilometers in diameter and its surface has an albedo of (0.245±0.021) and (0.282±0.057), respectively. The Collaborative Asteroid Lightcurve Link assumes a standard albedo for members of the Flora family of 0.24 and calculates a diameter of 10.80 kilometers based on an absolute magnitude of 12.0. Other publications by the WISE team give a mean diameter of (9.452±1.432) and (12.264±0.069) kilometers with a corresponding albedo of (0.442±0.250) and (0.2056±0.0121).
