= 1144 Oda =

Hildian asteroid

Discovery
- Discovered by: K. Reinmuth
- Discovery site: Heidelberg Obs.
- Discovery date: 28 January 1930

Designations
- Named after: A girl's name picked from a popular German calendar
- Alternative designations: 1930 BJ · 1959 CJ; 1967 EV
- Minor planet category: main-belt · (outer); Hilda

Orbital characteristics
- Epoch 4 September 2017 (JD 2458000.5)
- Uncertainty parameter 0
- Observation arc: 87.27 yr (31,875 days)
- Aphelion: 4.1018 AU
- Perihelion: 3.3959 AU
- Semi-major axis: 3.7489 AU
- Eccentricity: 0.0942
- Orbital period (sidereal): 7.26 yr (2,651 days)
- Mean anomaly: 131.28°
- Mean motion: 0° 8^{m} 8.88^{s} / day
- Inclination: 9.7423°
- Longitude of ascending node: 156.73°
- Argument of perihelion: 220.87°

Physical characteristics
- Dimensions: 56.347±0.194 km 57.59±2.2 km 57.65 km (derived); 64.21±0.96 km
- Synodic rotation period: 14.4 h (dated); 44.023±0.2530 h
- Geometric albedo: 0.043±0.001; 0.0533±0.004; 0.0583 (derived); 0.061±0.014
- Spectral type: Tholen = D · X B–V = 0.706; U–B = 0.249
- Absolute magnitude (H): 9.794±0.002 (R) · 9.9 · 10.00 · 10.05±0.54

1144 Oda, provisional designation 1930 BJ, is a dark Hildian asteroid from the outermost regions of the asteroid belt, approximately 57 kilometers in diameter. It was discovered on 28 January 1930, by German astronomer Karl Reinmuth at the Heidelberg-Königstuhl State Observatory. The asteroid's name is a German female name, not related to the discoverer's contemporaries.

== Orbit and classification ==
Oda belongs to the dynamical Hilda group which is located in the outermost part of the main belt. Asteroids in this group have semi-major axis between 3.7 and 4.2 AU and stay in a 3:2 resonance with the gas giant Jupiter. Oda, however, is a non-family background asteroid, i.e. not a member of the collisional Hilda family (001).

It orbits the Sun in the outer main belt at a distance of 3.4–4.1 AU once every 7 years and 3 months (2,651 days). Its orbit has an eccentricity of 0.09 and an inclination of 10° with respect to the ecliptic. The body's observation arc begins at Heidelberg, two months after its official discovery observation.

== Physical characteristics ==
In the Tholen classification, Oda is a dark and reddish D-type asteroid. It has also been characterized as an X-type by PanSTARRS photometric survey.

=== Rotation period ===
In May 2011, a rotational lightcurve of Oda was obtained from photometric observations in the R-band by astronomers at the Palomar Transient Factory in California. Lightcurve analysis gave a rotation period of 44.023 hours with a brightness variation of 0.41 magnitude (U=2). A previously measured period of 14.4 is now considered incorrect (U=1).

While not being a slow rotator, which have periods above 100 hours, Oda's spin rate is significantly longer than that of most other asteroids that have periods shorter than 20 hours.

=== Diameter and albedo ===
According to the surveys carried out by the Infrared Astronomical Satellite IRAS, the Japanese Akari satellite and the NEOWISE mission of NASA's Wide-field Infrared Survey Explorer, Oda measures between 56.347 and 64.21 kilometers in diameter and its surface has an albedo between 0.043 and 0.061.

The Collaborative Asteroid Lightcurve Link derives an albedo of 0.0583 and a diameter of 57.65 kilometers based on an absolute magnitude of 9.9.

== Naming ==
This minor planet was named after a girl's name picked from the German popular calendar Der Lahrer hinkende Bote (de).

As with 913 Otila, Reinmuth selected names from this calendar due to his many asteroid discoveries that he had trouble thinking of proper names. These names are not related to the discoverer's contemporaries. The author of the Dictionary of Minor Planet Names learned about Reinmuth's source of inspiration from private communications with Dutch astronomer Ingrid van Houten-Groeneveld, who worked as a young astronomer at Heidelberg.
