= Hinkender Bote =

Newspaper

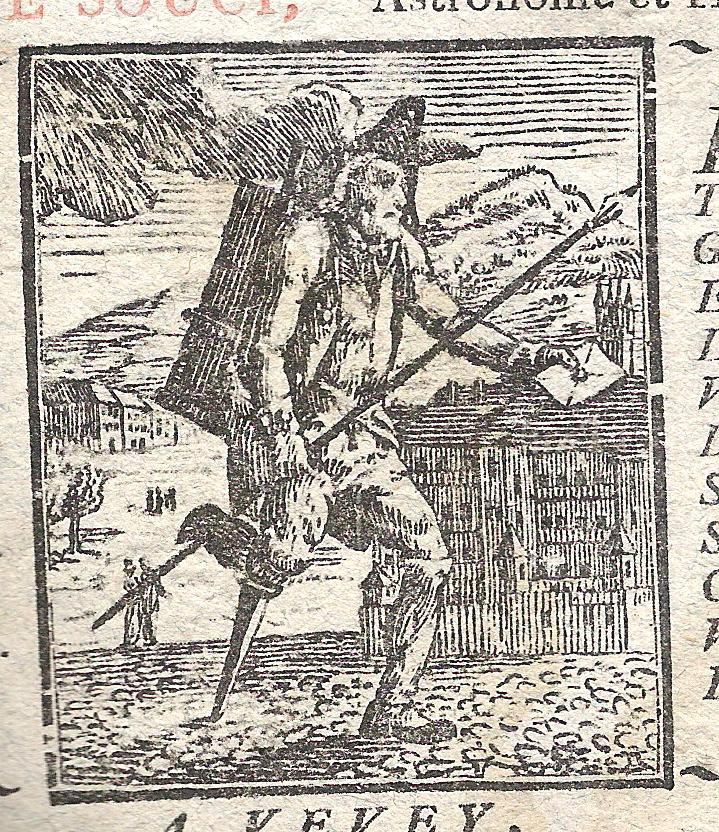
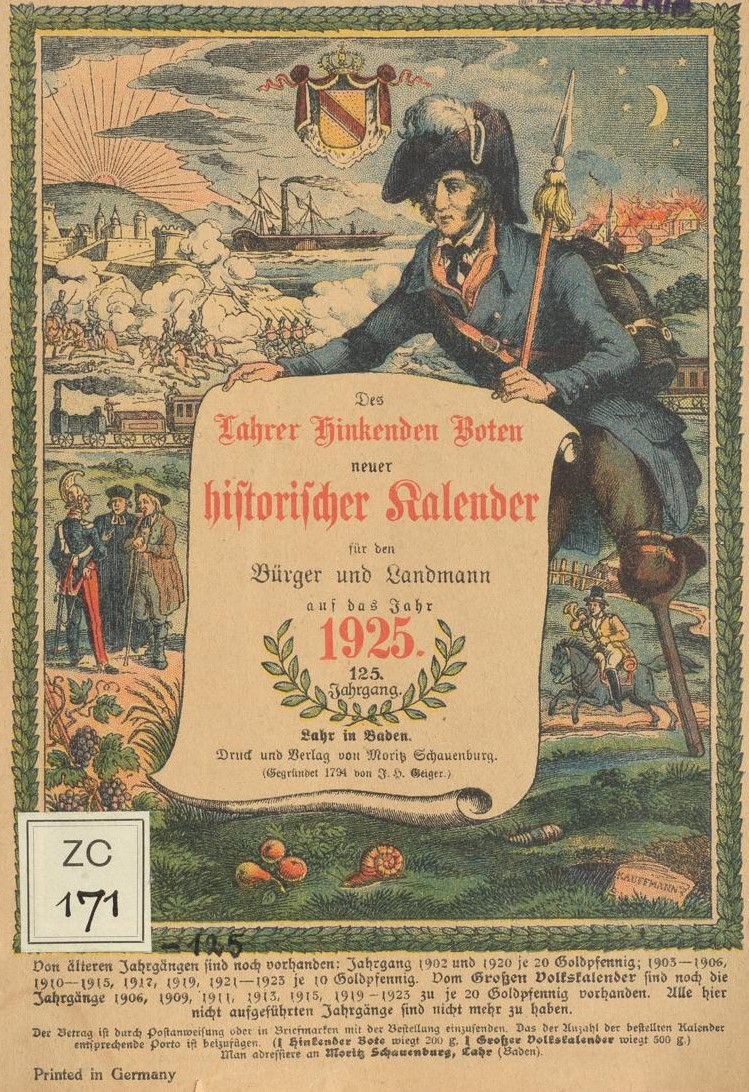
"Limping Messenger" title pages of the Messager boiteux de Berne et Vevey (1825) and Lahrer Hinkender Bote (1925)

Hinkender Bote ("limping messenger", French Messager boiteux, Italian Corrier zoppo) was the title of several early modern almanacs which appeared in Switzerland, from the later 17th century and throughout the 18th century and in some cases to the present day. Since 1801, the Lahrer Hinkender Bote has also been published in Lahr, Baden-Württemberg, Germany.

The first time the title Hinkender Bote is known to have appeared is in the year 1587 in Braunschweig. The symbol of a limping men was probably chosen due to the many limping men that became unfit for the work on the fields due to the Thirty Years war. They used to travel from village to village and spread the news. "The limping messenger is a story written by Comenius "The labyrinth of the world and the paradise of the heaert" in 1663. The origin of this allegorical figure comes from the way in which news from the battle field reached the public.

The Basler Hinkender Bote appeared in Basel in 1676. A French edition of the Basel publication appeared in Vevey in 1707. A Bernese Hinkender Bote first appeared from 1695, from 1748 also in a French edition, Véritable Messager boiteux de Berne. This French edition was in turn published in a German translation in Vevey, as Hinkender Bott von Vivis, from 1794 to 1848. Both the Bernese and the Vevey publication persist today. A Véritable Messager boiteux de Neuchâtel appeared 1805–1962. In Lugano, there was a Corrier zoppo, o sia Mercurio storico e politico from 1756 to 1762.

The almanachs contained calendars with both Catholic and Protestant feast days, the dates of important fairs and astronomical ephemerides, and anecdotal accounts of events of the preceding years sections accompanied with illustrations. In Vevey, a tradition developed of depicting a real-life leg amputee on the cover; the currently serving "limping messenger" is one Jean-Luc Sansonnens of Fribourg (b. 1969) who lost his leg in a motorcycle accident in 1988. His predecessor was local celebrity Samuel Burnand (1896-1985).

== See also ==
- Neuer Berner Kalender
