= Calendar (publication) =

Stationery to track dates

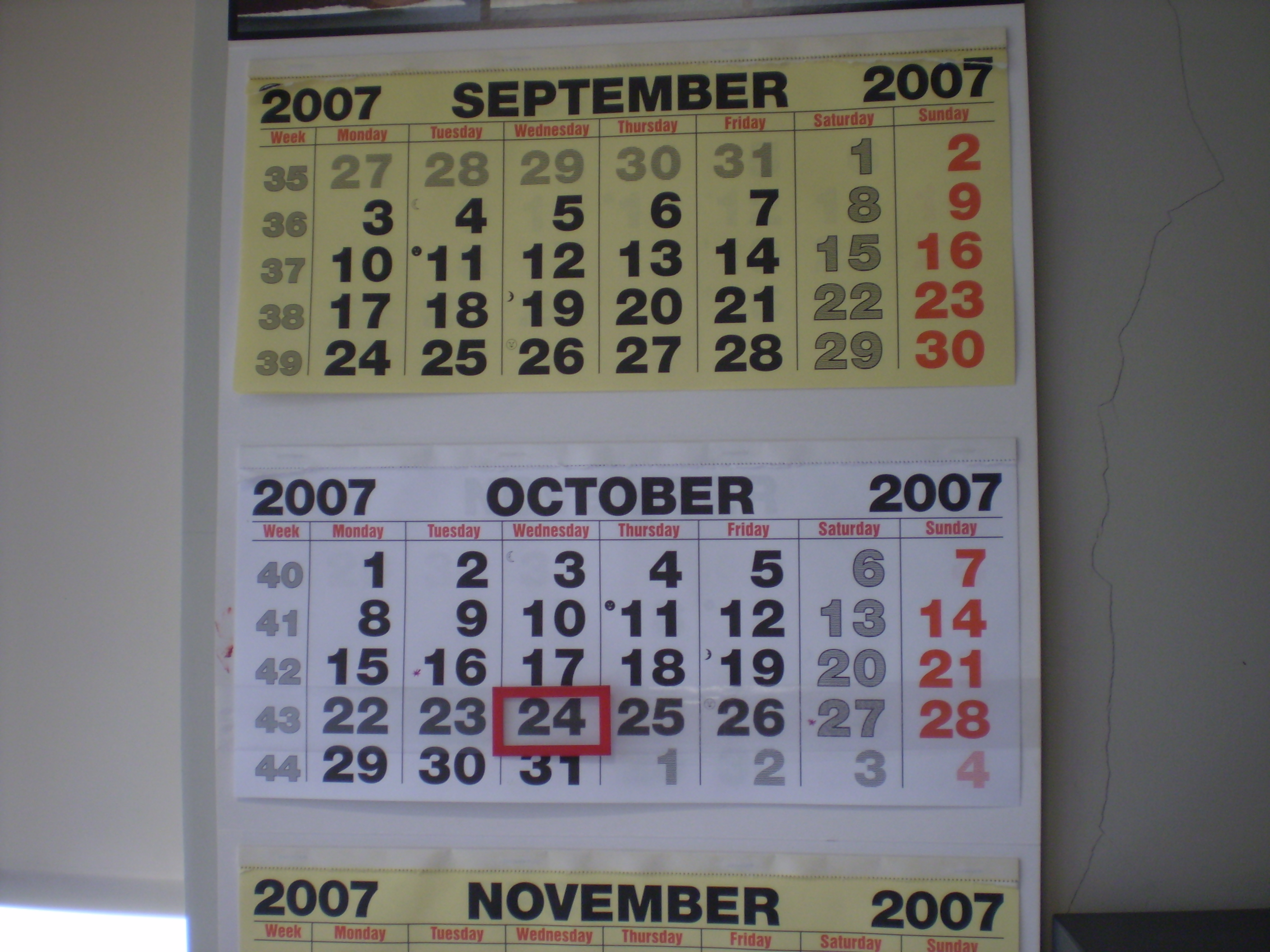
A 2007 wall calendar with moveable date marker

Printed calendars, in addition to its main function to display dates and related information, usually in a table format, also often contain additional information relevant for specific groups – for instance, a Christian liturgical calendar will show holy days and liturgical colours, while a calendar for amateur astronomers will highlight phases of the moon, conjunctions and eclipses. Calendars for general public may also contain various interesting facts (e.g., associated with anniversaries of important people or important events). Various facts were also printed on the back sides of the sheets of a tear-off calendar. In modern times, calendars may also have a decorative purpose.

== History ==
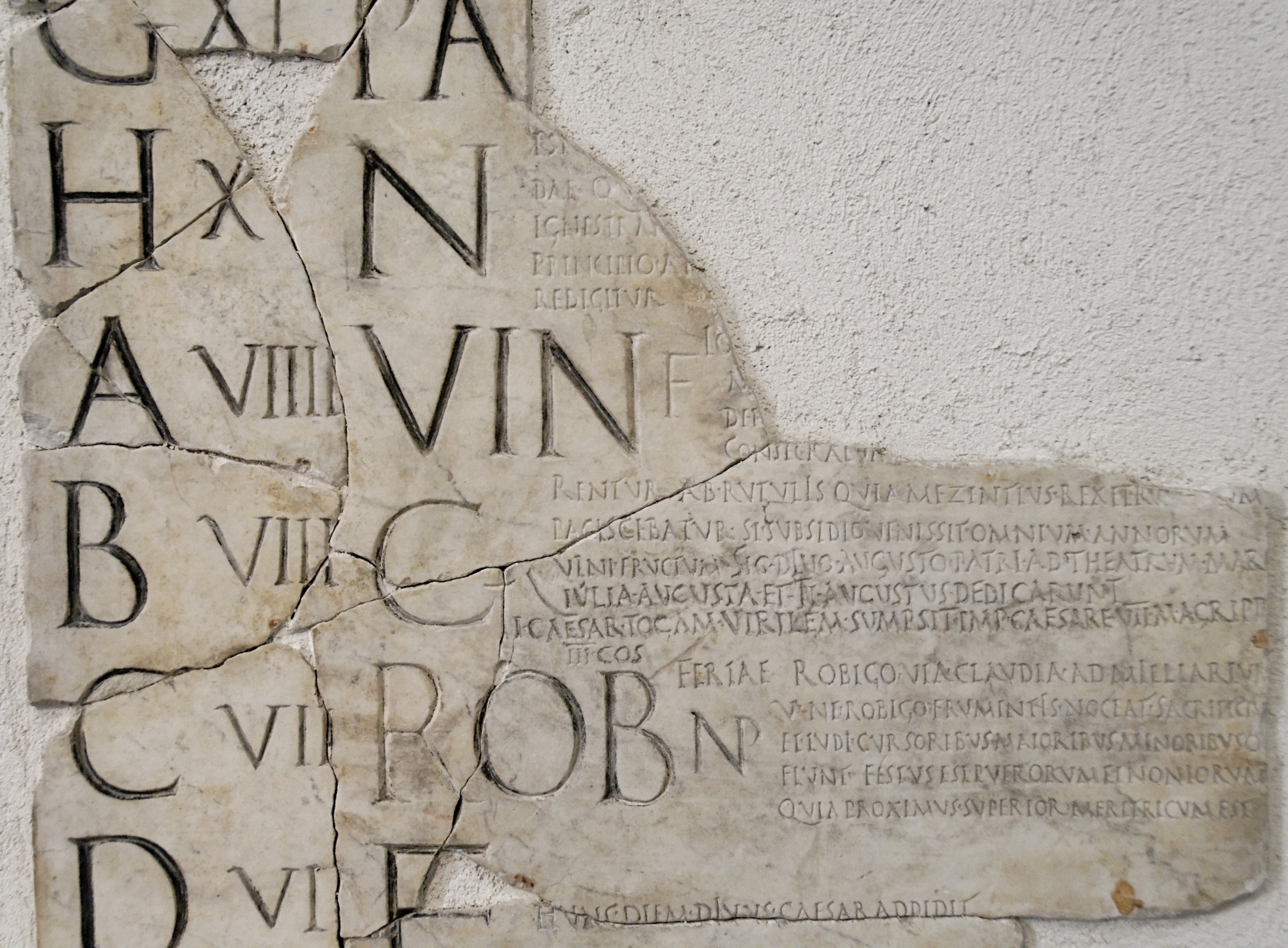
The Fasti Praenestini, an early Roman calendar, listing the Vinalia and Robigalia festivals

Ancient documents and inscriptions, such as those from Rome and China, include early forms of calendars. Printing gave rise to many related types of publication which track dates, of which calendars are just one. The modern calendar evolved alongside others such as almanacs, which collected religious, cultural, meteorological, astronomical and astrological information in a table format; practica, which gave astrological predictions for the year ahead; and diaries, which were for personal and professional use. The introduction of broadside printing allowed a calendar to be printed on a single large sheet of paper, differentiating the basic calendar from more detailed diaries and practica. In the absence of accurate clocks, calendars doubled as timekeeping aids – by noting the times of sunrise and moonrise, calendars helped farmers tell the time while in the fields.

== Decorative calendars ==
A NASA calendar celebrating the International Space Station. It notes anniversaries from the history of spaceflight and includes photographs from the ISS

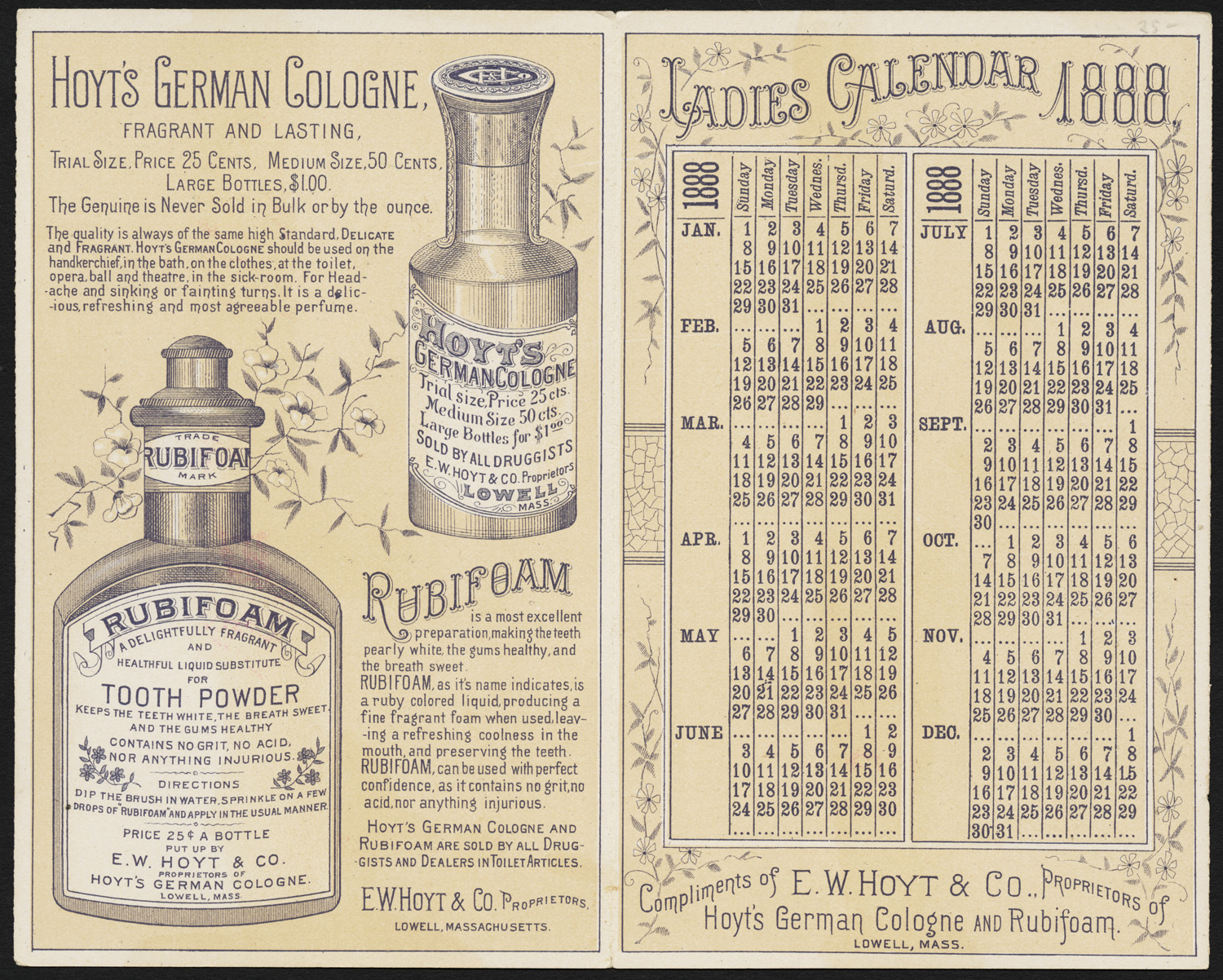
A free calendar from 1888 advertising medical products

Alongside their practical use, calendars have developed into a decorative item. Typically, each page will include a new image, which may be related to the season. Common subjects include landscapes, automobiles, wildlife, male or female models and popular culture. Businesses frequently give wall calendars branded with their names and contact information away for free to customers as promotional merchandise.

An especially influential type of calendar is the nude calendar or pin-up calendar – a calendar containing images of either scantily-clad or naked models. Some are essentially pornographic in nature, but a more recent evolution is calendars featuring people in comic situations and published for charity.

A popular subgenre of pin-up calendar is the firefighter calendar.

== Gallery ==
There are many types of calendar, serving a wide variety of uses.

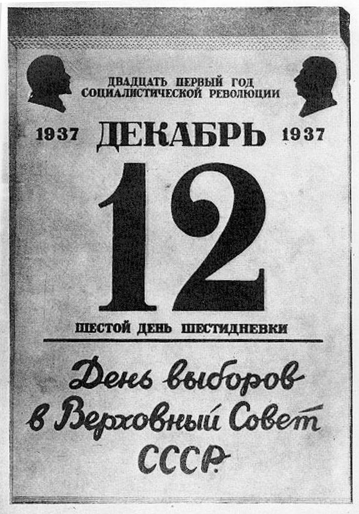
A Soviet day calendar, showing 12 December 1937 and reminding citizens that it is Election Day

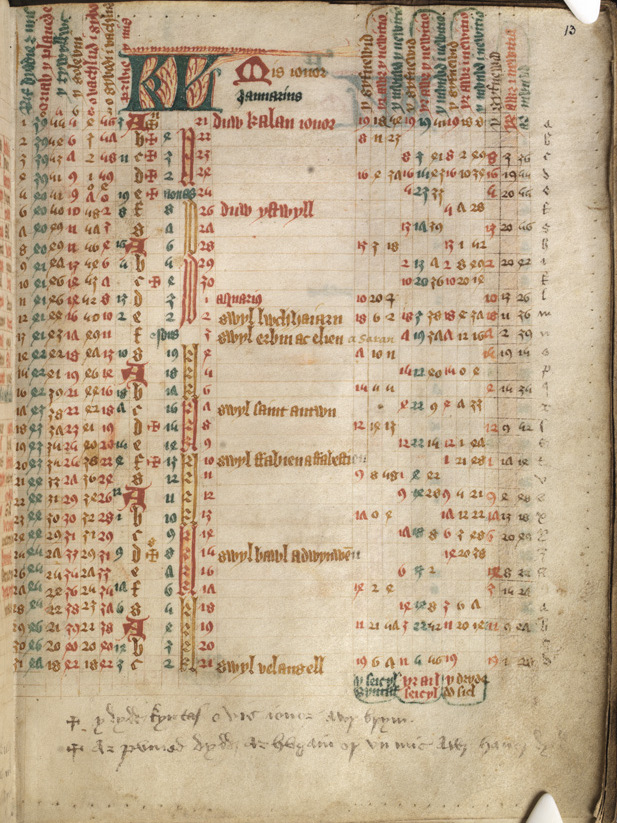
A late 15th century Welsh calendar of saints

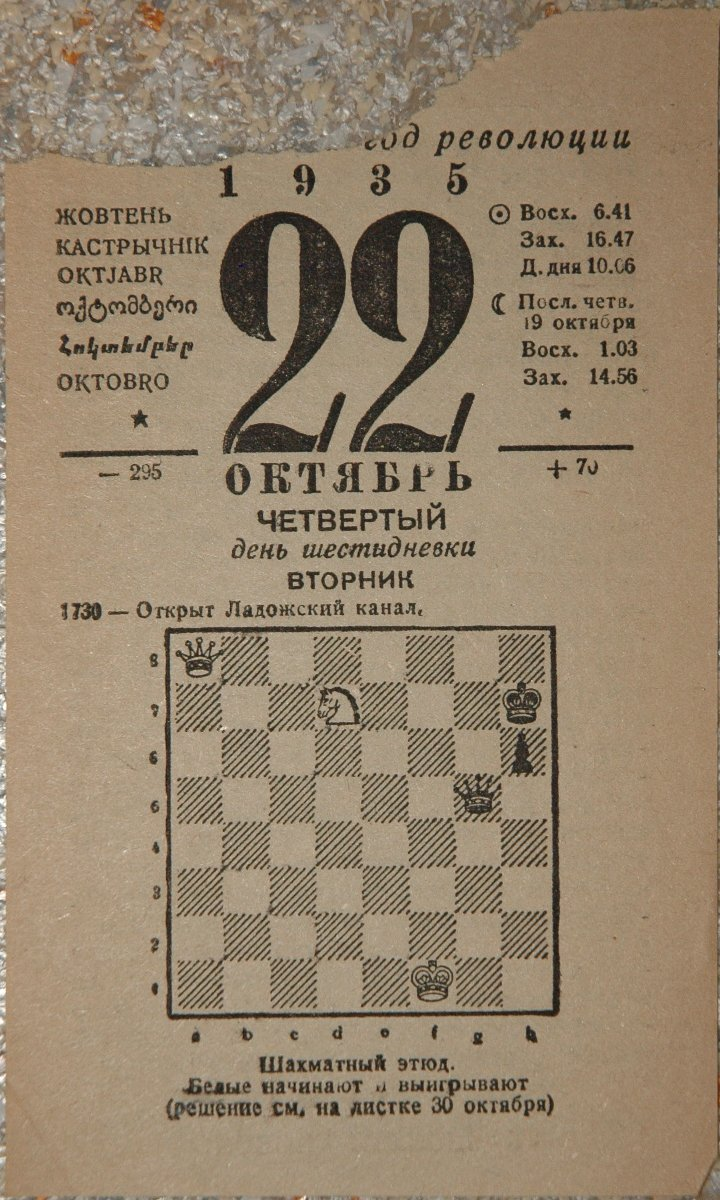
A Soviet calendar, showing 22 October 1935, with a daily chess problem for entertainment

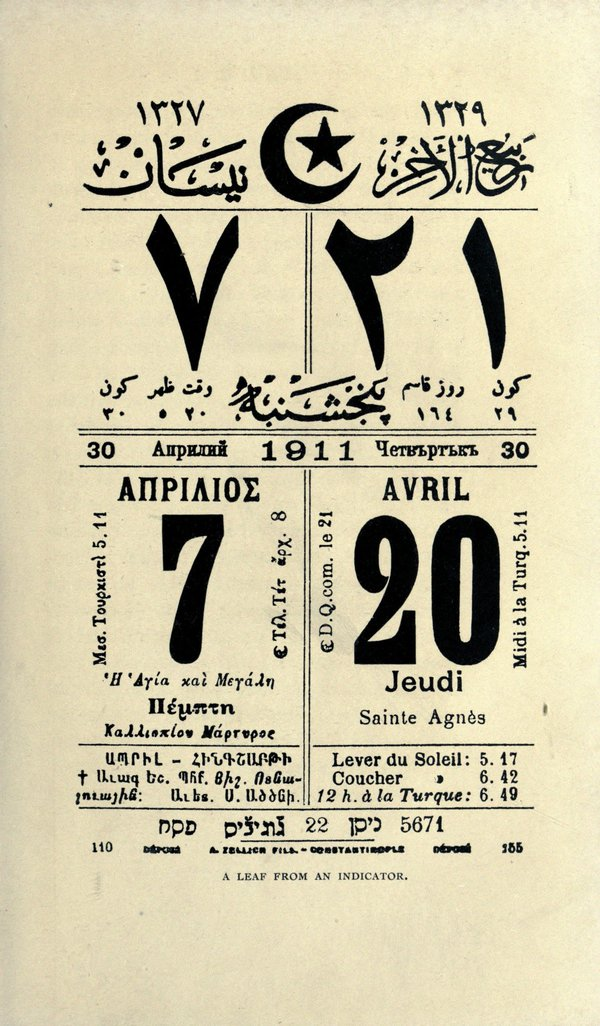
An Ottoman day calendar showing the same day in multiple formats and languages: Rumi, Julian, Gregorian, Islamic and Hebrew

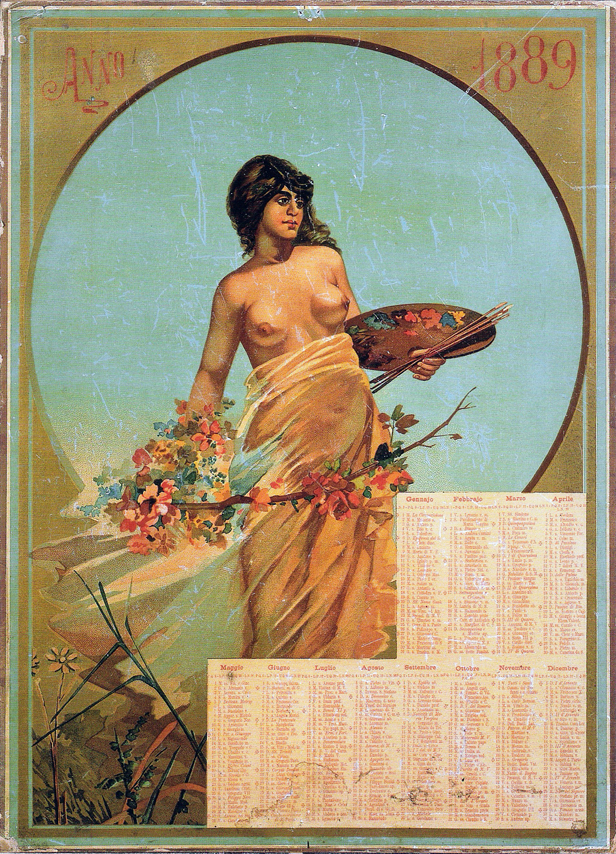
An early sexualized calendar

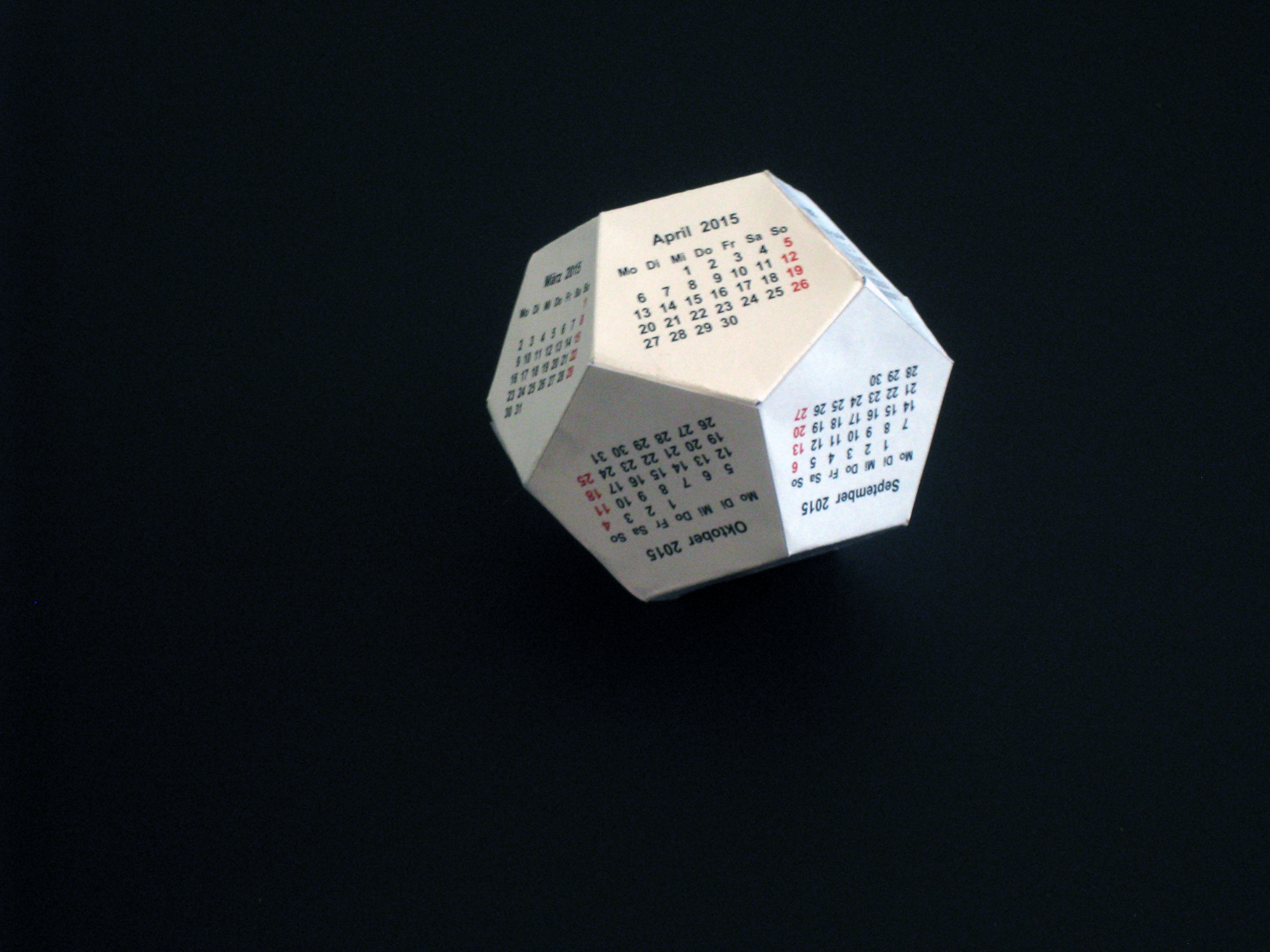
A calendar printed on a dodecahedron

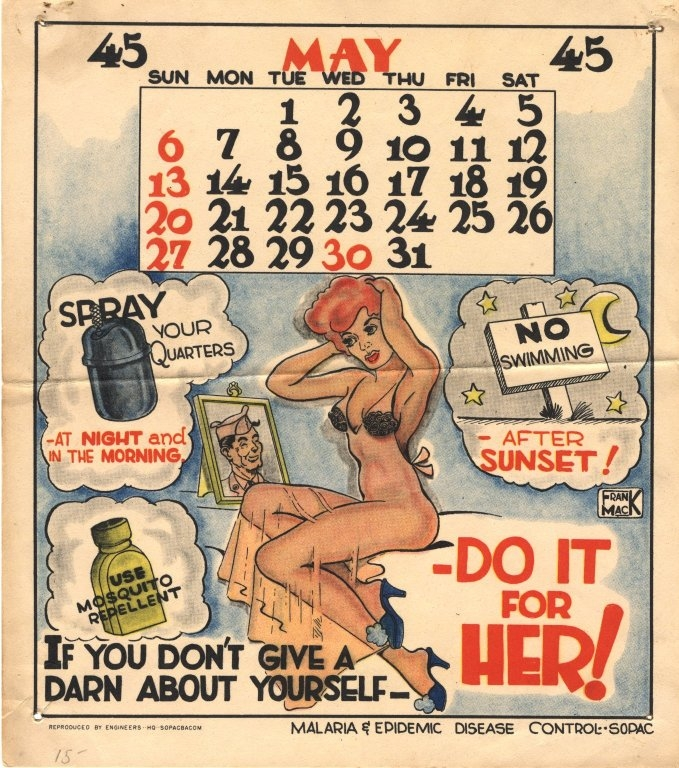
A propaganda calendar using pin-up style to urge measures against malaria

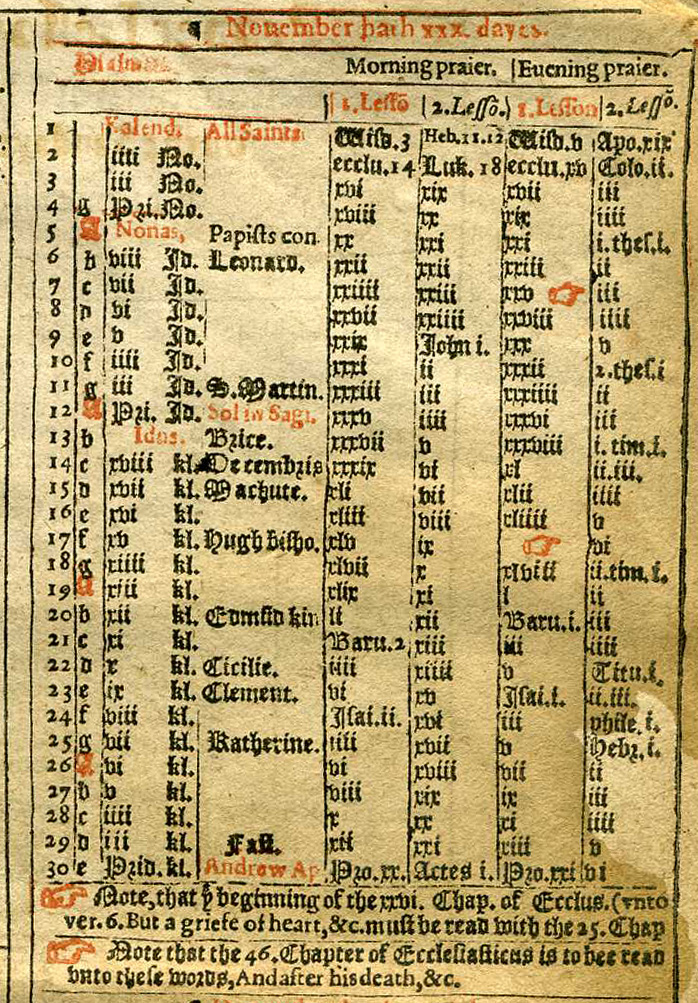
A prayer calendar from the Book of Common Prayer

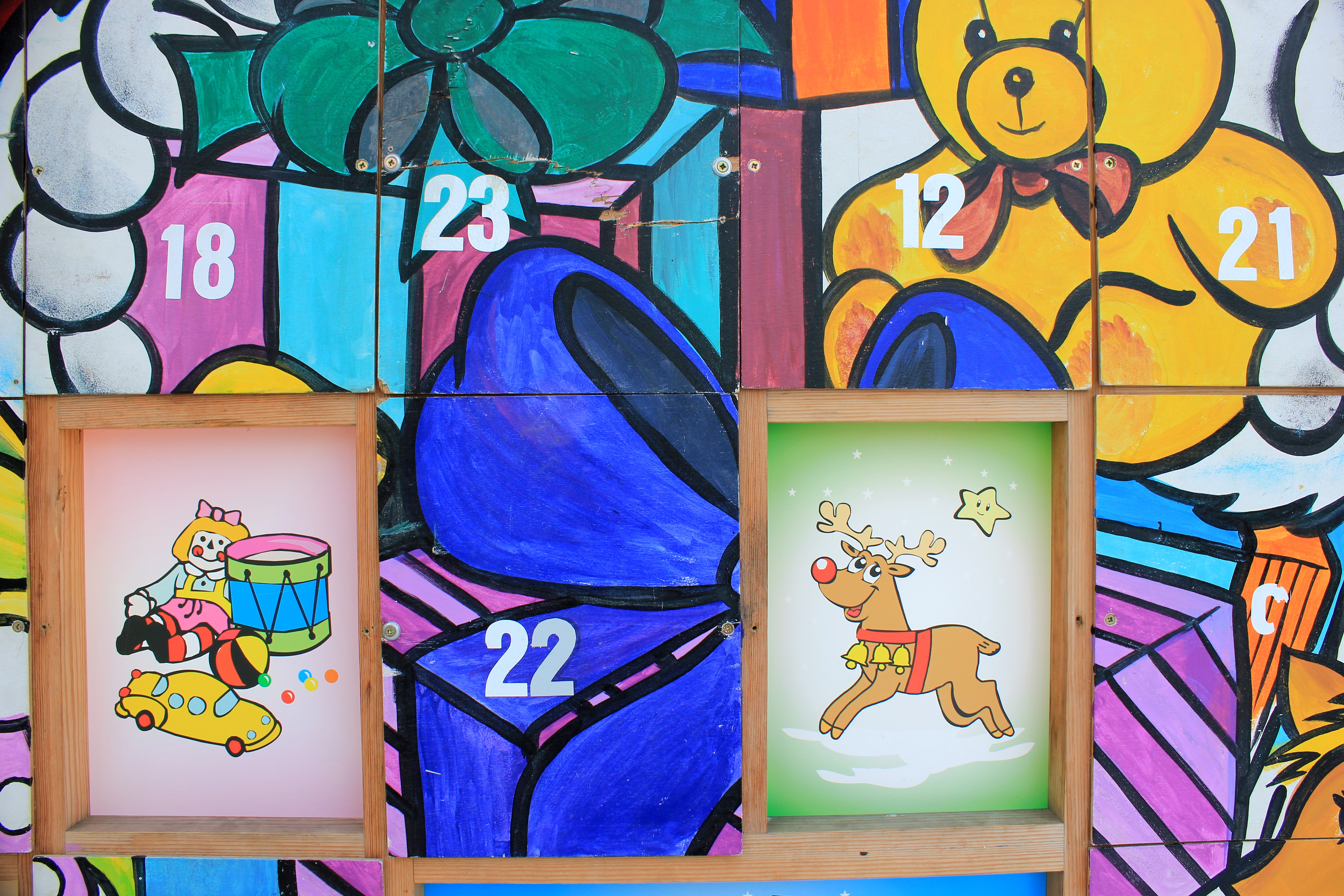
Detail of an Advent calendar with some doors opened

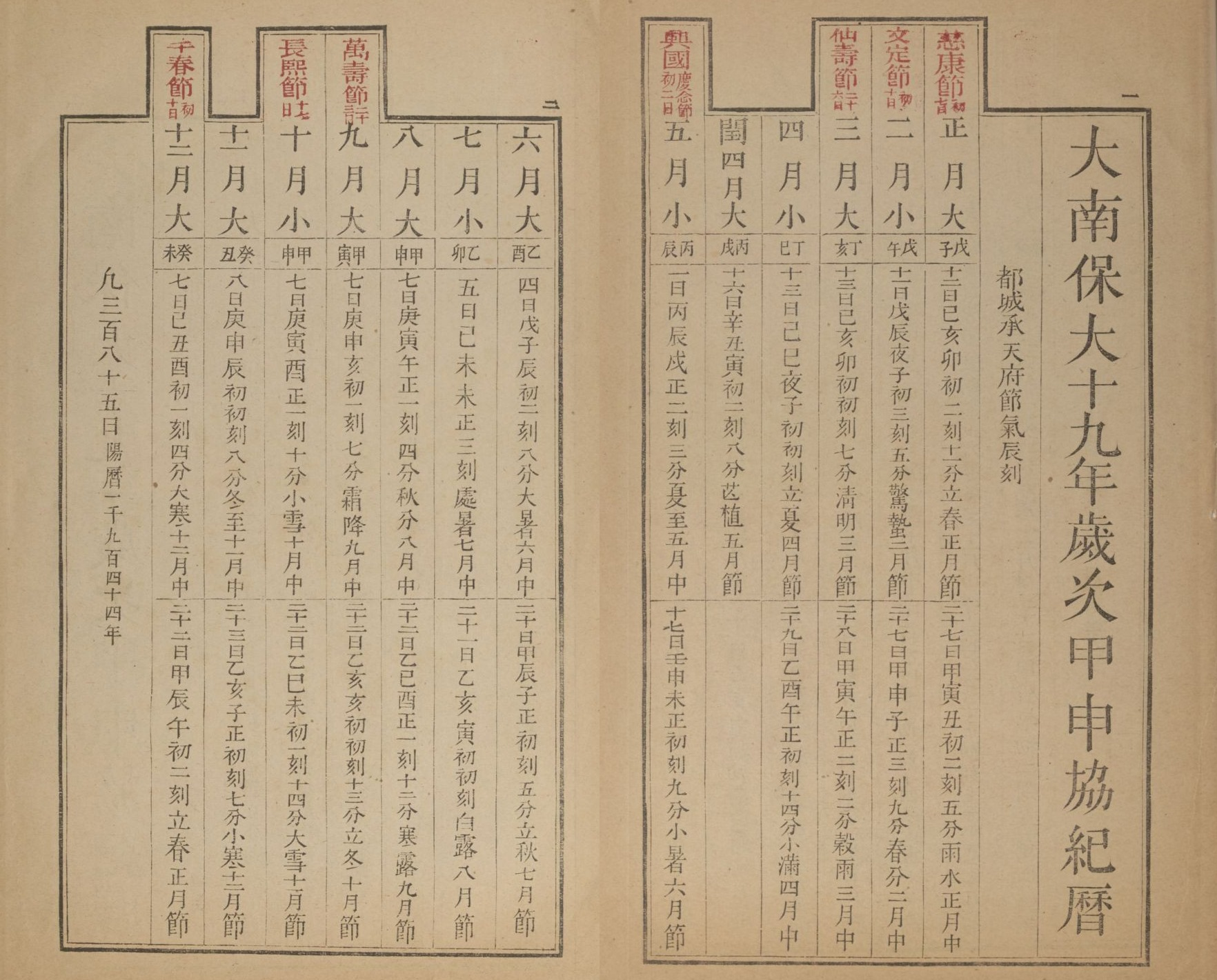
A Vietnamese calendar issued for the year Bảo Đại 19 (1944) showing all the national holidays and observations of the Nguyễn dynasty.

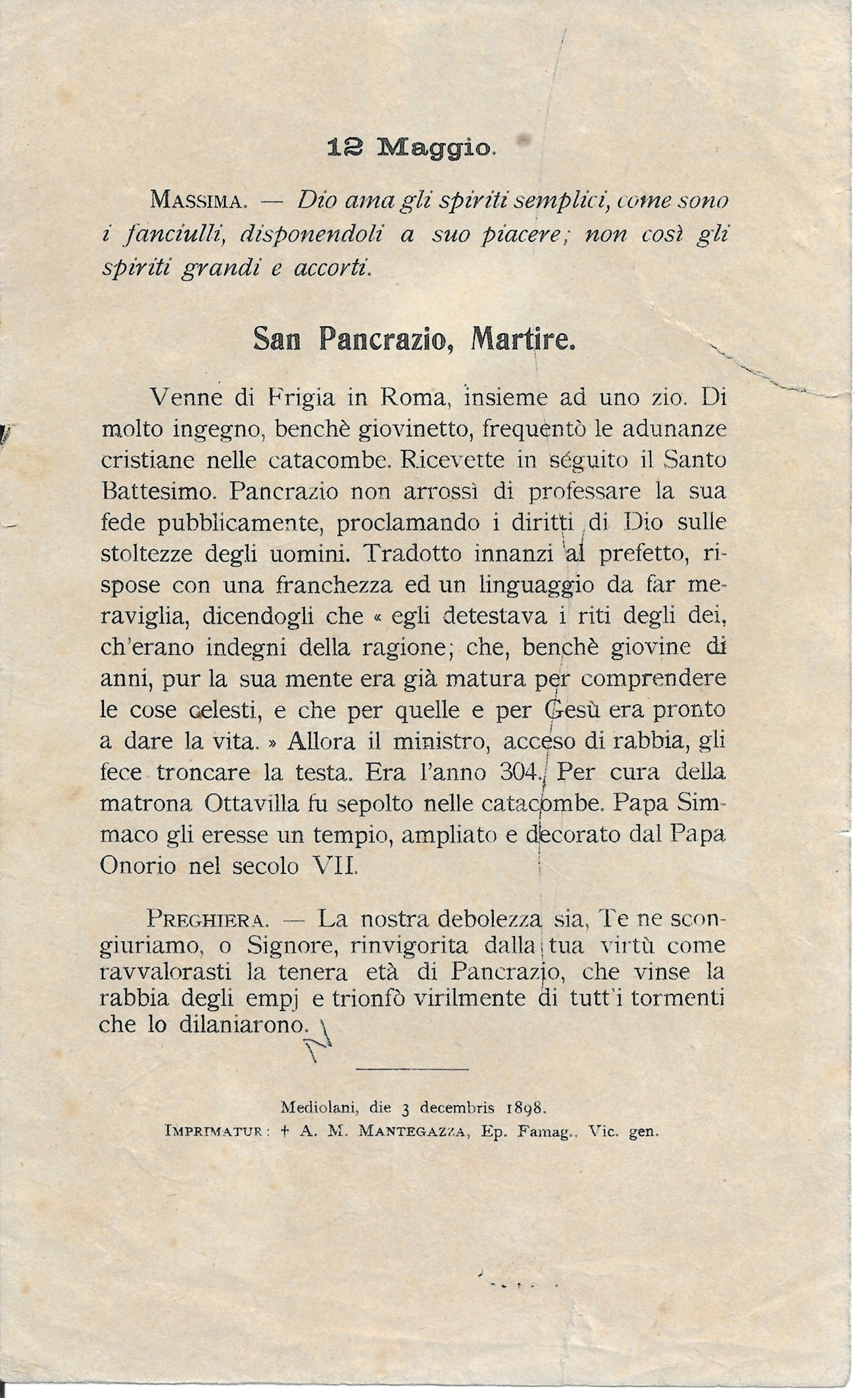
The back side of a calendar sheet with a biography of a martyr of the day
