= Ingrid van Houten-Groeneveld =

Dutch astronomer (1921–2015)

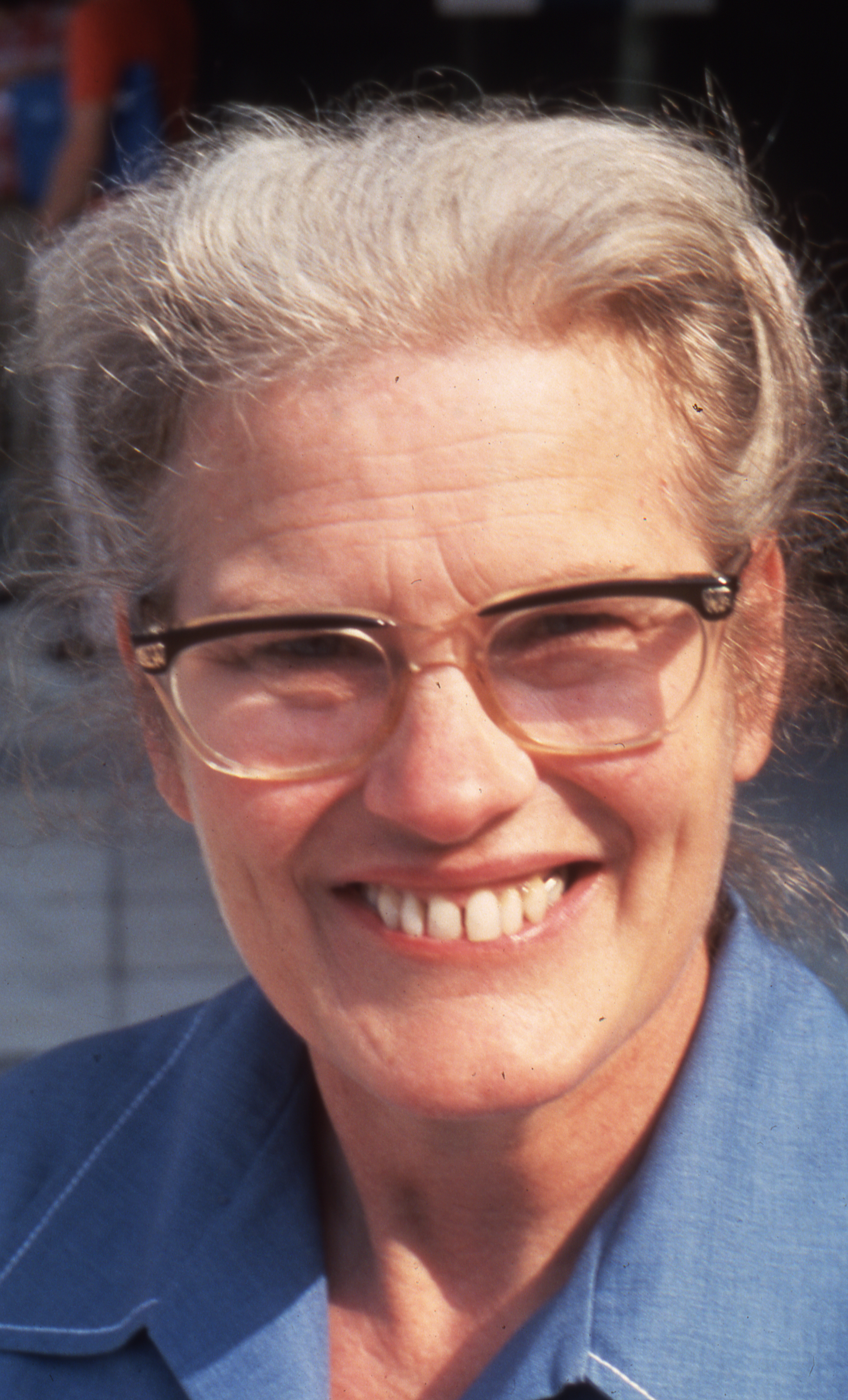
- Van Houten-Groeneveld in 1976
- Born: Ingrid Groeneveld; 21 October 1921; Berlin, Weimar Republic
- Died: 30 March 2015 (aged 93); Oegstgeest, Netherlands
- Known for: Minor planets
- Spouse: Cornelis Johannes van Houten (died 2002)
- Children: Karel van Houten
- Scientific career
- Fields: Astronomy
- Workplaces: Leiden Observatory; Palomar Observatory

Minor planets discovered: 4644
see § List of discovered minor planets

Ingrid van Houten-Groeneveld (Dutch pronunciation: [ˈɪŋɡrɪt fɑn ˈɦʌutə(ŋ) ˈɣrunəˌvɛlt]; (Note: In isolation, van and Houten are pronounced [vɑn] and [ˈɦʌutə(n)], respectively.) née Groeneveld; 21 October 1921 – 30 March 2015) was a Dutch astronomer and prolific discoverer of asteroids.

== Background ==
In a jointly credited trio with Tom Gehrels and her husband Cornelis Johannes van Houten, she was the discoverer of many thousands of asteroids (credited by the Minor Planet Center with the discovery of 4,641 numbered minor planets). In the Palomar–Leiden survey, Gehrels took the images using the 48-inch Schmidt telescope at Palomar Observatory and shipped the photographic plates to the van Houtens at Leiden Observatory, who analyzed them for new asteroids. The trio are jointly credited with several thousand asteroid discoveries. Van Houten-Groeneveld died on 30 March 2015, at the age of 93, in Oegstgeest, Netherlands.

The Themistian main-belt asteroid 1674 Groeneveld – discovered by Karl Reinmuth at Heidelberg and independently discovered by Finnish astronomer Yrjö Väisälä in 1938, was named in her honor (M.P.C. 2901).

== Publications ==
- Groeneveld, Ingrid (1947). "Lichtelektrische Beobachtungen ausgewählter veränderlicher Sterne". Veröffentlichungen der Badischen Landessternwarte zu Heidelberg. 14 (5): 43. Bibcode:1947ViHei..14...43G.
- Groeneveld, Ingrid; Kuiper, Gerard P. (1954). "Photometric studies of asteroids. I". Astrophysical Journal. 120 (120): 200. Bibcode:1954ApJ...120..200G. doi:10.1086/145904.
- Kuiper, G. P.; Fujita, Y.; Gehrels, T.; Groeneveld, I.; Kent, J.; van Biesbroeck, G.; van Houten, C. J. (1958). "Survey of Asteroids". Astrophysical Journal Supplement. 3: 289. Bibcode:1958ApJS....3..289K. doi:10.1086/190037.
- van Houten-Groeneveld, Ingrid; van Houten, C. J. (1958). "Photometrics Studies of Asteroids. VII". Astrophysical Journal. 127: 253. Bibcode:1958ApJ...127..253V. doi:10.1086/146459.
- Bilo, E. H.; Van Houten-Groeneveld, I. (1960). "The original values of 1/a for 17 cometary orbits". Bulletin of the Astronomical Institutes of the Netherlands. 15: 155. Bibcode:1960BAN....15..155B.
- van Houten-Groeneveld, I. (1963). "The original values of 1/a for seven comets". Bulletin of the Astronomical Institutes of the Netherlands. 17: 240. Bibcode:1963BAN....17..240V.
- van Houten-Groeneveld, I. (1963). "Definitive elements for comets 1951 I and 1955 IV". Bulletin of the Astronomical Institutes of the Netherlands. 17: 223. Bibcode:1963BAN....17..223V.
- van Houten, C. J.; Van Houten-Groeneveld, I. (1965). "A new periodic comet observed in 1960". Bulletin of the Astronomical Institutes of the Netherlands. 18: 441. Bibcode:1965BAN....18..441V.
- van Houten, C. J.; Van Houten-Groeneveld, I.; Herget, P.; Gehrels, T. (1970). "The Palomar-Leiden survey of faint minor planets". Astronomy and Astrophysics Supplement. 2 (5): 339. Bibcode:1970A&AS....2..339V.
- van Houten, C. J.; van Houten-Groeneveld, I.; Gehrels, T. (1970). "Minor planets and related objects. V. The density of Trojans near the preceding Lagrangian Point". The Astronomical Journal. 75 (5): 659. Bibcode:1970AJ.....75..659V. doi:10.1086/111002.
- Zappala, V.; van Houten-Groeneveld, I. (1979). "Pole coordinates of the asteroids 9 Metis, 22 Kalliope, and 44 NYSA" (PDF). Icarus. 40 (2): 289–296. Bibcode:1979Icar...40..289Z. doi:10.1016/0019-1035(79)90073-3. hdl:1887/6717. Archived from the original (PDF) on 18 July 2011.
- van Houten-Groeneveld, I.; Van Houten, C. J.; Zappala, V. (1979). "Photoelectric photometry of seven asteroids" (PDF). Astronomy and Astrophysics Supplement. 35: 223–232. Bibcode:1979A&AS...35..223V.
- Zappala, V.; Van Houten-Groeneveld, I.; Van Houten, C. J. (1979). "Rotation period and phase curve of the asteroids 349 Dembowska and 354 Eleonora" (PDF). Astronomy and Astrophysics Supplement. 35: 213–221. Bibcode:1979A&AS...35..213Z. Archived from the original (PDF) on 18 July 2011.
- van Houten-Groeneveld, I. (1981). "Photoelectric light curve of Pallas". Astronomy and Astrophysics. 98 (1): 203–204. Bibcode:1981A&A....98..203V.
- van Houten-Groeneveld, I.; Van Houten, C. J.; Wisse-Schouten, M.; Bardwell, C.; Gehrels, T. (1989). "The 1977 Palomar-Leiden Trojan survey" (PDF). Astronomy and Astrophysics. 224 (1–2): 299–302. Bibcode:1989A&A...224..299V.
- van Houten, C. J.; van Houten-Groeneveld, I.; Wisse-Schouten, M.; Bardwell, C.; Green, W. E.; Gehrels, T. (1991). "The second Palomar-Leiden Trojan survey" (PDF). Icarus. 91 (2): 326–333. Bibcode:1991Icar...91..326V. doi:10.1016/0019-1035(91)90028-R. hdl:1887/6740.
- van Houten-Groeneveld, I.; Gehrels, T.; Van Houten, C. J.; Wisse, A. (2003). "Minor Planet Observations [675 Palomar Mountain]" (PDF). Minor Planet Circular. 49973: 1. Bibcode:2003MPC..49973...1V.
- Hicks, M. D.; Helin, E. F.; Shoemaker, C. S.; Van Houten-Groeneveld, I.; Bowell, E.; Trujillo, C. A.; Kavelaars, J. (2003). "Minor Planet Observations [675 Palomar Mountain]" (PDF). Minor Planet Circular. 49504: 1. Bibcode:2003MPC..49504...1H.
- McNaught, R. H.; Gehrels, T.; Van Houten, C. J.; Van Houten-Groeneveld, I.; Spahr, T. B. (2003). "1999 FK21". Minor Planet Electronic Circ. 2002-D12 (2002–D12): 12. Bibcode:2002MPEC....D...12M.
- van Houten-Groeneveld, I.; Gehrels, T.; Van Houten, C. J.; Wisse, A. (2004). "Minor Planet Observations [675 Palomar]" (PDF). Minor Planet Circular. 52895: 8. Bibcode:2004MPC..52895...8V.
- Helin, E. F.; Shoemaker, C. S.; Van Houten-Groeneveld, I.; Bowell, E.; Kavelaars, J.; Bus, S. J.; Hicks, M.; Lawrence, K.; et al. (2004). "Minor Planet Observations [675 Palomar Mountain]" (PDF). Minor Planet Circular. 52503: 7. Bibcode:2004MPC..52503...7H.
- Helin, E. F.; Shoemaker, C. S.; Van Houten-Groeneveld, I.; Bowell, E.; Trujillo, C. A.; Kavelaars, J.; Hicks, M.; Lawrence, K.; et al. (2004). "Minor Planet Observations [675 Palomar Mountain]" (PDF). Minor Planet Circular. 51594: 1. Bibcode:2004MPC..51594...1H.
- Helin, E. F.; Shoemaker, C. S.; Van Houten-Groeneveld, I.; Bowell, E.; Lawrence, K.; Shoemaker, E. M.; Levy, D. H.; Gehrels, T.; et al. (2004). "Minor Planet Observations [675 Palomar Mountain]" (PDF). Minor Planet Circular. 50674: 6. Bibcode:2004MPC..50674...6H.
- Helin, E. F.; Shoemaker, C. S.; Van Houten-Groeneveld, I.; Brown, M.; Kavelaars, J.; Margot, J.-L.; Gladman, B.; Smith, I.; et al. (2005). "Minor Planet Observations [675 Palomar Mountain]". Minor Planet Circular. 54974: 10. Bibcode:2005MPC..54974..10H.
- van Houten-Groeneveld, I.; Bowell, E.; Roe, H. G.; Gehrels, T.; Shoemaker, E. M.; Shoemaker, C. S.; Levy, D. H.; Schlichting, H. E.; et al. (2005). "Minor Planet Observations [675 Palomar Mountain]". Minor Planet Circular. 54353: 7. Bibcode:2005MPC..54353...7V.
- Hicks, M. D.; Shoemaker, C. S.; Van Houten-Groeneveld, I.; Bowell, E.; Kavelaars, J.; Hicks, M.; Shoemaker, E. M.; Levy, D. H.; et al. (2005). "Minor Planet Observations [675 Palomar Mountain]". Minor Planet Circular. 53638: 4. Bibcode:2005MPC..53638...4H.
- Hicks, M. D.; Van Houten-Groeneveld, I.; Bowell, E.; Gehrels, T.; Shoemaker, E. M.; Shoemaker, C. S.; Levy, D. H.; Skiff, B. A.; et al. (2006). "Minor Planet Observations [675 Palomar Mountain]". Minor Planet Circular. 58106: 6. Bibcode:2006MPC..58106...6H.
- Helin, E. F.; Van Houten-Groeneveld, I.; Lawrence, K. J.; Gehrels, T.; Lawrence, K.; Van Houten, C. J.; Wisse, A. (2006). "Minor Planet Observations [675 Palomar Mountain]". Minor Planet Circular. 57581: 3. Bibcode:2006MPC..57581...3H.
- Hicks, M. D.; Van Houten-Groeneveld, I.; Bowell, E.; Kavelaars, J.; Hicks, M.; Gehrels, T.; Shoemaker, C. S.; Shoemaker, E. M.; et al. (2006). "Minor Planet Observations [675 Palomar Mountain]". Minor Planet Circular. 57119: 7. Bibcode:2006MPC..57119...7H.
- Hicks, M. D.; Helin, E. F.; Van Houten-Groeneveld, I.; Bowell, E.; Kavelaars, J.; Nicholson, P.; Gladman, B.; Carruba, V.; et al. (2006). "Minor Planet Observations [675 Palomar Mountain]". Minor Planet Circular. 56157: 12. Bibcode:2006MPC..56157..12H.
- Schmadel, L. D.; Stoss, R.; Burkhardt, G.; Paech, W.; Van Houten-Groeneveld, I. (2007). "Digitization of the Palomar-Leiden Survey and Trojan Survey Plates". ASP Conference Series. 377: 294. Bibcode:2007ASPC..377..294S.
- van Houten-Groeneveld, I.; Brown, M. E.; Trujillo, C.; Rabinowitz, D.; Schwamb, M. E. (2007). "Minor Planet Observations [675 Palomar Mountain]". Minor Planet Circular. 60457: 2. Bibcode:2007MPC..60457...2V.
- van Houten-Groeneveld, I.; Gehrels, T.; Stoss, R. (2007). "Minor Planet Observations [675 Palomar Mountain]". Minor Planet Circular. 59587: 7. Bibcode:2007MPC..59587...7V.
- van Houten-Groeneveld, I.; Bowell, E.; Brown, M. E.; Gehrels, T.; Bus, S. J.; Schwamb, M. E.; Rabinowitz, D. (2008). "Minor Planet Observations [675 Palomar Mountain]" (PDF). Minor Planet Circular. 63368: 5. Bibcode:2008MPC..63368...5V.
- van Houten-Groeneveld, I.; Kavelaars, J.; Brown, M. E.; Schwamb, M. E.; Rabinowitz, D.; Nicholson, P.; Gladman, B.; Coffey, J.; et al. (2008). "Minor Planet Observations [675 Palomar Mountain]" (PDF). Minor Planet Circular. 62571: 8. Bibcode:2008MPC..62571...8V.
- van Houten, C. J.; Van Houten-Groeneveld, I.; Van Genderen, A. M.; Kwee, K. (2009). "VBLUW Photometry of 13 Eclipsing Binary Stars". The Journal of Astronomical Data. 15: 2. Bibcode:2009JAD....15....2V.
