= Wuhan Tongji Hospital =

- National Health Commission

Geography
- Location: no.1095 Jiefang Avenue, Wuhan, Hubei Province
- Coordinates: 30.58205°N 114.25454°E

Organisation
- Type: Teaching, District General
- Affiliated university: Huazhong University of Science & Technology

Services
- Standards: Grade A tertiary hospital
- Beds: 2000

Links
- Website: www.tjh.com.cn

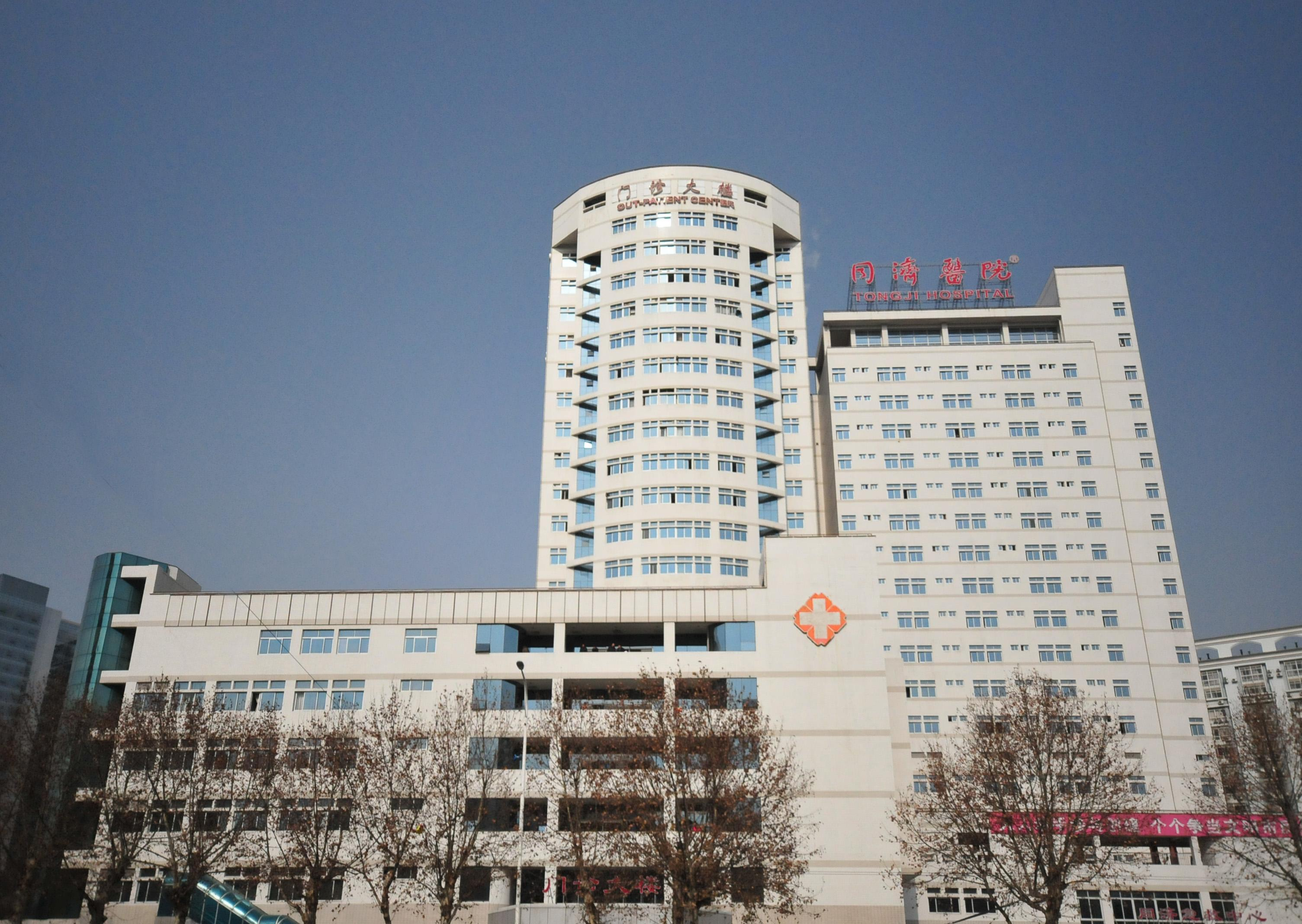
Tongji Hospital Outpatient Building

Wuhan Tongji Hospital (simplified Chinese: 武汉同济医院; traditional Chinese: 武漢同濟醫院; pinyin: Wǔhàn Tóngjì Yīyuàn), shortly "Tongji Hospital", full name "Tongji Hospital, Tongji Medical College, Huazhong University of Science & Technology (HUST)", is a comprehensive medical institution in Wuhan integrating medical treatment, teaching and scientific research. Founded in 1900, it is now a top Class-A tertiary hospital in China. As a teaching institution, it is also known as the Second Clinical College of Tongji Medical College.

== History ==
In 1900, Tung Chee Hospital, or Tongji Hospital, was founded by German doctor Erich Paulun in Shanghai. The word "Tongji" derived from the local dialect's pronunciation of "Deutschland" (means Germany ).

In 1907, Erich Paulun presided over the establishment of Tongji German Medical School (the predecessor of National Tongji University), with Tongji Hospital as its affiliated hospital. It was also called Paulun Hospital.

In 1927, the hospital became the Medical School of National Tongji University.

During the Anti-Japanese War (1937–1945), some employees of Paulun Hospital moved west with National Tongji University, carrying medical equipment. Other hospital staff stayed in Shanghai and continued to work at Paulun Hospital. The former Paulun Hospital on Fengyang Road is now the Shanghai Changzheng Hospital.

In 1946, After marching on nearly half China for 8 years, the left staff eventually moved back to Shanghai. And the hospital was renamed the Sino-American Hospital of the National Tongji University School of Medicine and reopened. (The United States donated some of the facilities.)

In 1951, after the founding of the People's Republic of China, the medical school was moved from Shanghai to Wuhan and merged with Wuhan University Medical School to form Central South Tongji Medical College. Tongji Hospital and Wuhan Union Hospital (formerly Hankow Mission and Hankou Union Hospital) founded in 1866 by Griffith John, a British, were both attached to the college as its teaching hospitals.

In 1955, Central South Tongji Medical College was renamed Wuhan Medical College, and the hospital was renamed the Second Affiliated Hospital of Wuhan Medical College.

In May 1985, the hospital was renamed Tongji Hospital Affiliated to Wuhan Medical College, also known as Wuhan Tongji Hospital. In July of the same year, Wuhan Medical College was renamed Tongji Medical University, and the hospital was renamed Tongji Hospital Affiliated to Tongji Medical University, and continued to use the name Wuhan Tongji Hospital.

In 2000, Tongji Medical University merged with Huazhong University of Science and Technology, Wuhan Institute of Urban Construction, and the Cadre Management Institute of Ministry of Science and Technology to form Huazhong University of Science and Technology. The hospital was renamed Tongji Hospital Affiliated to Tongji Medical College of Huazhong University of Science and Technology and continued to use the name Wuhan Tongji Hospital.

In 2012, the new surgical building of Wuhan Tongji Hospital was put into use. It was the largest surgical building in Central and South China at that time and was designed by the famous German designer Tukel Kosa.

in 2012 and 2015, the hospital passed the German KTQ quality certification and re-evaluation.

In May, 2015, there was a dispute over the trade mark of "Tongji" between Wuhan Tongji Hospital and the Tongji University in Shanghai. Wuhan Tongji Hospital now owns the "Tongji" trademark for hospital, dentistry, medical assistance and other projects.

== COVID-19 ==
In 2020, during the fight against COVID-19 (the first known case was identified in Wuhan), Tongji Hospital expanded its fever clinic by 50 times to receive patients, and provided the largest number of intensive care beds, and admitted the largest number of severe patients among the hospitals.

== Current Situation ==
Wuhan Tongji Hospital is a modern comprehensive hospital integrating medical service, teaching, and research. There are the Hankou Branch, Optical Valley Branch, Sino-French New City Branch and Junshan Branch, and other su-hospitals. It currently has 65 clinical and paramedical departments. The annual patient number in outpatient and emergency departments has ranked top in Hubei province for more than 10 years.

In addition, there are

- 11 national key disciplines (including 3 cultivation disciplines).
- 40 national key clinical specialties (second-most in China).
- 1 national key lab, 3 key labs of the Ministry of Education, 2 key labs of National Health Commission.
- The WHO Training Center for Rehabilitation, the National Medical Center for Major Public Health Events, the National Medical Center Construction Unit (Mentoring Unit), the National Clinical Medical Research Center for Obstetrical and Gynecological Diseases, the National Regional Medical Center Construction Output Unit Jointly Built by Commission and Province, the National Pilot Hospital for High-quality Development Jointly Built by Committee and Province, the Pilot Hospital for Comprehensive Modern Hospital Management System.

Tongji Hospital provides over 6 million annual outpatient visits. It was listed as the 6th top hospital in Fudan's China Hospital Ranking for years running.

== International collaboration ==
Tongji has established close cooperative relationship with over 70 medical institutions from over 25 countries, including Germany, USA, Japan, France, Russia and so on.

== See also ==
- Wuhan Union Hospital
- Tongji Medical College
- Huazhong University of Science and Technology
