= Lin Zhengbin =

Chinese physician (1957–2020)

- 林正斌
- Born: 6 July 1957; Wuhan, Hubei, China
- Died: 10 February 2020 (aged 62); Wuhan, Hubei, China
- Education: Tongji Medical College; Kanazawa University
- Scientific career
- Fields: organ transplantation
- Workplaces: Wuhan Tongji Hospital

Chinese name
- Chinese: 林正斌
Transcriptions
Standard Mandarin
- Hanyu Pinyin: Lín Zhèngbīn

Lin Zhengbin (Chinese: 林正斌, 6 July 1957 – 10 February 2020) was a Chinese physician and organ transplant expert at Wuhan Tongji Hospital.

== Biography ==
Lin graduated from Tongji Medical College in 1987, where he obtained a bachelor's degree in medicine. After graduation, he started his career at Wuhan Tongji Hospital, engaged in organ transplants for more than 30 years. He was chief physician of the Institute of Organ Transplantation of Tongji Hospital.

He retired in July 2017, but was rehired by Wuhan Tongji Hospital.

During the COVID-19 pandemic in China, Lin was infected with the virus. He died on 10 February 2020 due to complications caused by the disease.
