= Huazhong University of Science and Technology =

Public research university in Wuhan, Hubei, China

Coordinates: 30°30′36″N 114°24′36″E

- 华中科技大学
- Motto: 明德、厚学、求是、创新
- Motto in English: Virtue, Erudition, Truth, Innovation
- Type: Public university
- Established: 2000
- President: You Zheng
- Faculty: 3,448
- Location: Wuhan, Hubei, China
- Colors: Blue Red
- Mascots: Wild boar / Yellow Crane and White Cloud
- Website: hust.edu.cn

Chinese name
- Simplified Chinese: 华中科技大学
- Traditional Chinese: 華中科技大學
Transcriptions
Standard Mandarin
- Hanyu Pinyin: Huázhōng Kējì Dàxué

The Huazhong University of Science and Technology (HUST; 华中科技大学) is a public university in Wuhan, Hubei, China. The university is part of Project 985, Project 211, and the Double First-Class Construction.

It is a comprehensive key university directly under the Ministry of Education. Its history can be traced back to the original Huazhong Institute of Technology established in Wuhan in 1952, the Shanghai German Medical School (predecessor of Tongji University) founded by German physician Erich Paulun in 1907, and the original Central South School of Architecture and Engineering established in Mount Lu, Jiangxi province in the 1950s. The three schools merged to form Huazhong University of Science and Technology on May 26, 2000.

== History ==
After the 1949 Revolution, Wuhan was designated the leading city of the Central South region, one of six geographical divisions in China. The Huazhong Institute of Technology, established in 1953, was envisioned as a major national polytechnic institution, akin to Harbin Institute of Technology, Zhejiang University, Jiao Tong University, and Chongqing University within their respective regions. Under the leadership of Zhu Jiusi, the institute rapidly developed into a significant technological university during the 1950s.

In 1958, the institute expanded its scope by introducing programmes in basic and applied sciences, including mathematics, physics, and chemistry. However, these efforts were disrupted by the Cultural Revolution, which began in 1966. When Zhu Jiusi returned to the campus in 1970, he found the university largely abandoned and occupied by local farmers. He initiated efforts to rebuild the institution, recruiting scholars from top universities across China who had been sent to the countryside during the upheaval.

Following the end of the Cultural Revolution in 1976, Deng Xiaoping's return to power in 1978 marked a new era for higher education. That same year, Zhu Jiusi presented a report at a national meeting emphasising the dual importance of universities as centres for both research and teaching. After retiring in 1984, Zhu remained an influential figure in shaping China's higher education.

In 1998, China launched Project 985 to develop world-class universities. Initially, the institution was not selected in the first batch. To improve its prospects, the Wuhan municipal government proposed merging the institute with Wuhan University. Following mediation by Education Minister Chen Zhili, a compromise was reached: Tongji Medical University and Wuhan Urban Construction University were merged into the institution and the institution was renamed as the Huazhong University of Science and Technology, while Wuhan University was consolidated with three other local universities. Both newly merged universities were subsequently included in Project 985.

Since the 1990s, the university has spearheaded the establishment of a state laboratory in opto-electronics, which later evolved into the Optics Valley, a prominent high-tech development zone near its campus.

== Rankings ==
University rankings
BCUR National	Domestic	9
Wu Shulian National	Domestic	5
CUAA National	Alumni	8
QS National	General	16
THE National	General	12
QS Asia (Asia version)	General	69
THE Asia (Asia version)	General	29
ARWU World	Research	72
QS World	General	319
THE World	General	=166
USNWR World	General	=91

- 2026 Academic Ranking of World Universities: # 72 in the world, #14 in Asia, and #10 in Greater China (including Mainland China, Hong Kong, Macao, and Taiwan).
- 2026 Center for World University Rankings: 84th in the world, 14th in Asia, and 8th in Greater China (including Mainland China, Hong Kong, Macao, and Taiwan).
- 2025 U.S. News & World Report Best Global University Ranking (U.S. News): 91st in the world, 18th in Asia and 11th in China.
- 2024 Times Higher Education: 158th in the world and 9th in China.

== Alumni ==
=== Politicians ===
- Lou Qinjian, HUST Class 1981, CPC Secretary of Jiangsu Province, former Governor of Shaanxi Province and Vice Minister of Information Industry
- Qian Xinzhong, Tongji Class 1928, Minister of Health, China (1965–1973, 1979–1983)
- Xie Fuzhan, HUST Class 1980, President of Chinese Academy of Social Sciences, the former Governor of Henan Province, China.
- Zhou Ji, HUST Class 1980, President, China Academy of Engineering (2010–2018), Minister of Education, China (2003–2009), Mayor of Wuhan (2001–2002)
- Jiang Jinquan, Director of the Central Policy Research Office(2020–2025).
- Wang Cheng, HUST Class 1981, President, Hohai University.

=== Sportspeople ===
- Li Ting, HUST Class 2006, tennis player, Gold Medal Winner at the 2004 Summer Olympics in women's doubles.
- Li Na, HUST Class 2005, tennis player, Winner of Australian Open (2014) and French Open (2011), highest world ranking for Singles: No. 2.
- Zheng Qinwen, HUST Class 2023, tennis player, 2024 Paris Olympic golden medal winner of women's tennis single.

=== Businesspeople ===
- Gong Hongjia, HUST Class 1982, billionaire businessman, 137th in 2018 Forbes World billionaires list in 2018
- Meng Wanzhou, chief financial officer and deputy board chairperson of Huawei.
- Zhang Xiaolong, HUST Class 1991, Senior Vice President of Tencent, creator of WeChat.
- Feng Ji, HUST Class 2000, Founder and CEO of Game Science, producer of Black Myth: Wukong.

=== Scientists ===
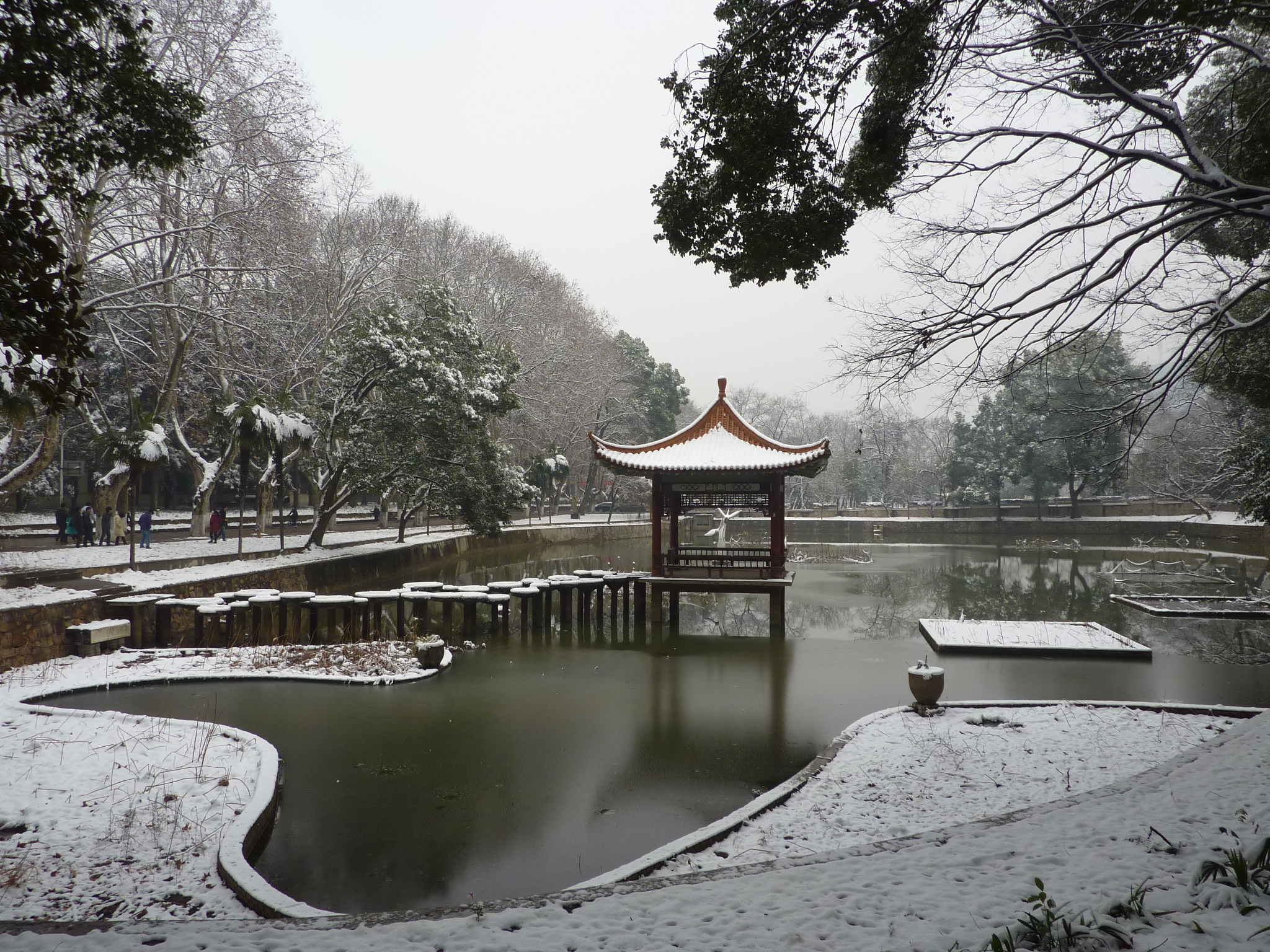
On a winter day at HUST

- Deng Julong, the founder of Grey system theory.
- Liu Sifeng, the Marie-Curie Fellow (UK), IEEE Fellow and the renowned expert of grey systems. He was one of the 10 shortlisted promising scientists in the MSCA (EU-funded Marie Curie Actions) 2017 Prizes.
- Chunying Chen, Chinese chemist and professor of chemistry at the National Center for Nanoscience and Technology
- Gang Chen, professor at MIT and elected member of the National Academy of Engineering (2010)
- Lihong V. Wang, professor at Caltech and elected member of the National Academy of Engineering (2018)
- Alan Luo, professor at Ohio State University and elected member of the National Academy of Engineering (2023)
- Frank Hu, professor at Harvard and elected member of the National Academy of Medicine (2015)
- Qian Fenghua, professor at Manipal Institute of Technology

==== Members of the China Academy of Sciences ====
- Bei Shizhang, elected in 1955, Tongji Med BS (1921).
- Liang Boqiang, elected in 1955, Pathologist, Tongji Med BS (1922).
- Qiu Fazu, elected in 1993, Senior Member of CAS, Tongji Med BS (1936).
- Wu Mengchao, elected in 1991, 2005 National Supreme Science and Technology Awardee, Tongji Med BS (1949).
- Yang Shuzi, elected in 1991, HUST BS (1956).
- Fang Fuquan, elected in 2017, Vice President of Capital Normal University, HUST BS (1986).

==== Members of the China Academy of Engineering ====
- Zhou Ji, elected in 1999, President of Chinese Academy of Engineering, foreign member of National Academy of Engineering (US), HUST MS (1980).
- Hou Yunde, National Supreme Science and Technology Awardee (2018), Vice president of Chinese Academy of Engineering, HUST Tongji Med BS (1955).
- Li Dequn, elected in 2015, HUST MS (1980).
- Ma Ding, elected in 2017, HUST Tongji Med BS (1982), MS (1986), Ph.D. (1990).
- Luo Xiwen, elected in 2009, Vice president of South China Agricultural University, HUST BS (1969).
- You Zheng, elected in 2013, Vice president of Tsinghua University, HUST BS (1985), MS (1987), Ph.D. (1990).
- Wu Weiren, elected in 2015, Chief Designer of Lunar Exploration Engineering, HUST Ph.D. (2004).
- Zou Xuexiao, elected in 2017, President of Hunan Academy of Agricultural Sciences, HUST Ph.D. (2002).
