= Transpacific Antiracism =

First edition

Transpacific Antiracism: Afro-Asian Solidarity in 20th-Century Black America, Japan, and Okinawa is a 2013 non-fiction book by Yuichiro Onishi, published by New York University Press. It details relations between African-Americans and Japanese people in civil rights issues.

Crystal S. Anderson of Elon University wrote that "racial discourse" rather than race itself is the book's focus, and "By reorienting the discussion from individuals to ideas, Onishi grounds the book’s argument in race as a political category rather than a biological one." Tristan Ivory of Stanford University wrote that the work "stands out in that it seeks to connect multiple and sometimes conflicting perspectives and encounters of Black, Japanese, and Okinawan peoples while treating those divergences as sites of meaningful analysis."

== Contents ==
Initially, in the "Discourses" part, the book discusses early 20th century black-Japanese cooperation, and black perspectives concerning the country, including how the perspectives changed in that era. In "Collectives" the topic shifts to the second half of the century, and how the Japanese adopted tactics of civil rights figures.

The first chapter highlights proposals for African-American and Japanese alliances in World War I, as African-Americans perceived Japan as opposing white people. The second chapter focuses on W.E.B. DuBois's advocacy for Japan and his perception that it, opposed to European and U.S. powers, could be an ally for his causes. He also addressed DuBois in the previous chapter. Jeeyun Lim of Denison University described the analysis of DuBois as having "more depth and with [the author's] own brand of critical acumen" compared to other works. According to the book, DuBois did not acknowledge racist attitudes from the Japanese. Onishi argued that the said advocacy unintentionally promoted Eurocentrism.

The third chapter discusses the "Association of Negro Studies" (Kokujin Kenkyu no Kai), a post-World War II group of Japanese people studying African-Americans, and the left-leaning intelligentsia that formed its membership. In addition to the group, the chapter emphasizes Yoshitaka Nukina. The fourth discusses white and black U.S. soldiers and locals in Okinawa who opposed the U.S. governmental goals. Ivory describes the Okinawa chapter as "the most satisfying read of all", with the passages describing how the groups did not achieve their aims to work together as being the "most impressive" aspect.

The ending portion of the book describes a class on African-American studies Onishi taught, with the majority of the students being black. Naoko Shibusawa of Brown University stated that Onishi is "unapologetically hopeful that another world is possible."

According to Marc Gallicchio of Villanova University, the author includes information on negative traits of his subjects even though he "is clearly sympathetic with the anti-imperialist, ant [sic]-racist agenda of his subjects". Lim described the Association of Negro Studies chapter's discussion on how black radical political thought had influence on the Japanese is what "few have done before". Shibusawa wrote that some "distressing" incidents are discussed in the book and "the tales that Onishi tells are not romanticized."

== Reception ==
Anderson wrote that the book "continues to expand our notions of black intellectualism" and "adds to the body of knowledge on black internationalism by extending its reach."

Chris Dixon of University of Queensland concluded that the book "is a fine study of international reformism and radicalism." He added that while the author has strong political opinions, the book remains high quality and is not affected by the beliefs.

Gallicchio criticized the lack of demonstration of connections between subjects, which he argued resulted in a lack of a theme, as well as too much focus on "writing for other academics in the field"; he stated there was too much "impenetrable prose", from over-use of jargon meant for his target audience, and that even some of his target readers would have trouble deciphering his words. He stated that some case studies were "interesting".

Ivory concluded that the book is "an original and necessary addition to the literature on Afro-Asian solidarity and ethnic and racial coalition building more broadly." He praised how the author, whom he described as being very good at being a historian, illustrated how people in Japan absorbed the philosophies and tactics from African-American activists and overcame "the degree of difficulty in linking up three separate physical spaces at three different periods of time." Ivory criticized how the author shaped the "transpacific racism" concept, as he felt the research done by the book's author undermined the concept, as well as author deriving so much of his "analytical framework", including "concepts or idioms", from historians. Ivory argued the latter could be removing attention that should be devoted to the author's own concepts.

Lim described it as "a unique and valuable contribution to the scholarship on Afro-Asian relations".

Y. Kiuchi of Michigan State University wrote in Choice Reviews that he/she/they "Recommended" the book.
