= Sheng Liu =

Sheng Liu from the Huazhong University of Science and Technology, Wuhan, China was named Fellow of the Institute of Electrical and Electronics Engineers (IEEE) in 2014 for leadership in engineering development of LED packaging.
