= Wu Weiren =

Chinese physicist (born 1953)

- 吴伟仁
- Born: October 1953 (age 72); Pingchang County, Sichuan, China
- Education: University of Science and Technology of China; Huazhong University of Science and Technology; Northwestern Polytechnical University
- Scientific career
- Fields: Telemetry and telecontrol
- Workplaces: Lunar Exploration and Space Engineering Center of the State Administration for Science, Technology and Industry for National Defense

Chinese name
- Traditional Chinese: 吳偉仁
- Simplified Chinese: 吴伟仁
Transcriptions
Standard Mandarin
- Hanyu Pinyin: Wú Wěirén

Wu Weiren (Chinese: 吴伟仁; born October 1953) is a Chinese physicist who is the chief designer of the Chinese Lunar Exploration Program.

== Biography ==
Wu was born in the town of Desheng, Pingchang County, Bazhong, Sichuan province, in October 1953. He secondary studied at Pingchang High School. In 1975, he was admitted to the University of Science and Technology of China, where he majored in telemetry and telecontrol. After graduating in 1978, he was dispatched to the Beijing Institute of Telemetry Technology as an engineer and eventually became its deputy president. In August 1997, he was appointed factory manager of the Jianhua Instrument Factory, a factory under the control of the Aerospace Industry Corporation. In July 1998, he was transferred to the Department of Science and Technology, Commission for Science, Technology and Industry for National Defense, where he successively served as its deputy director and director. He moved to the Lunar Exploration and Space Engineering Center of the State Administration for Science, Technology and Industry for National Defense in August 2008 and was appointed the chief designer of the Chinese Lunar Exploration Program. In June 2016, he was elected a member of the Standing Committee of the China Association for Science and Technology. In March 2018, he became a member of the Standing Committee of the 13th Chinese People's Political Consultative Conference. In September 2020, the asteroid No. 281880 was officially named as "Wu Weiren Star" for his contribution in the field of moon and deep space exploration.

== Honours and awards ==
- 1991 State Science and Technology Progress Award (Third Class) for telemetry data processing system
- 1995 State Science and Technology Progress Award (First Class) for real time computer telemetry system
- 2004 State Science and Technology Progress Award (Special Award) for launch vehicle engineering
- 2007 State Science and Technology Progress Award (Second Class) for researching on the security of spatial information transmission
- 2012 State Science and Technology Progress Award (Special Award) for Chang'e 2 project
- November 2013 Member of the International Academy of Astronautics (IAA)
- October 2015 Member of the Chinese Academy of Engineering (CAE)
- 2016 State Science and Technology Progress Award (First Class) for Chang'e 3 project
- 2020 State Science and Technology Progress Award (Special Award) for Chang'e 4 project
