= Ministry of Foreign Affairs (China) =

Chinese government department

Ministry of Foreign Affairs of the People's Republic of China
- 中华人民共和国外交部
- Logo of the Ministry of Foreign Affairs

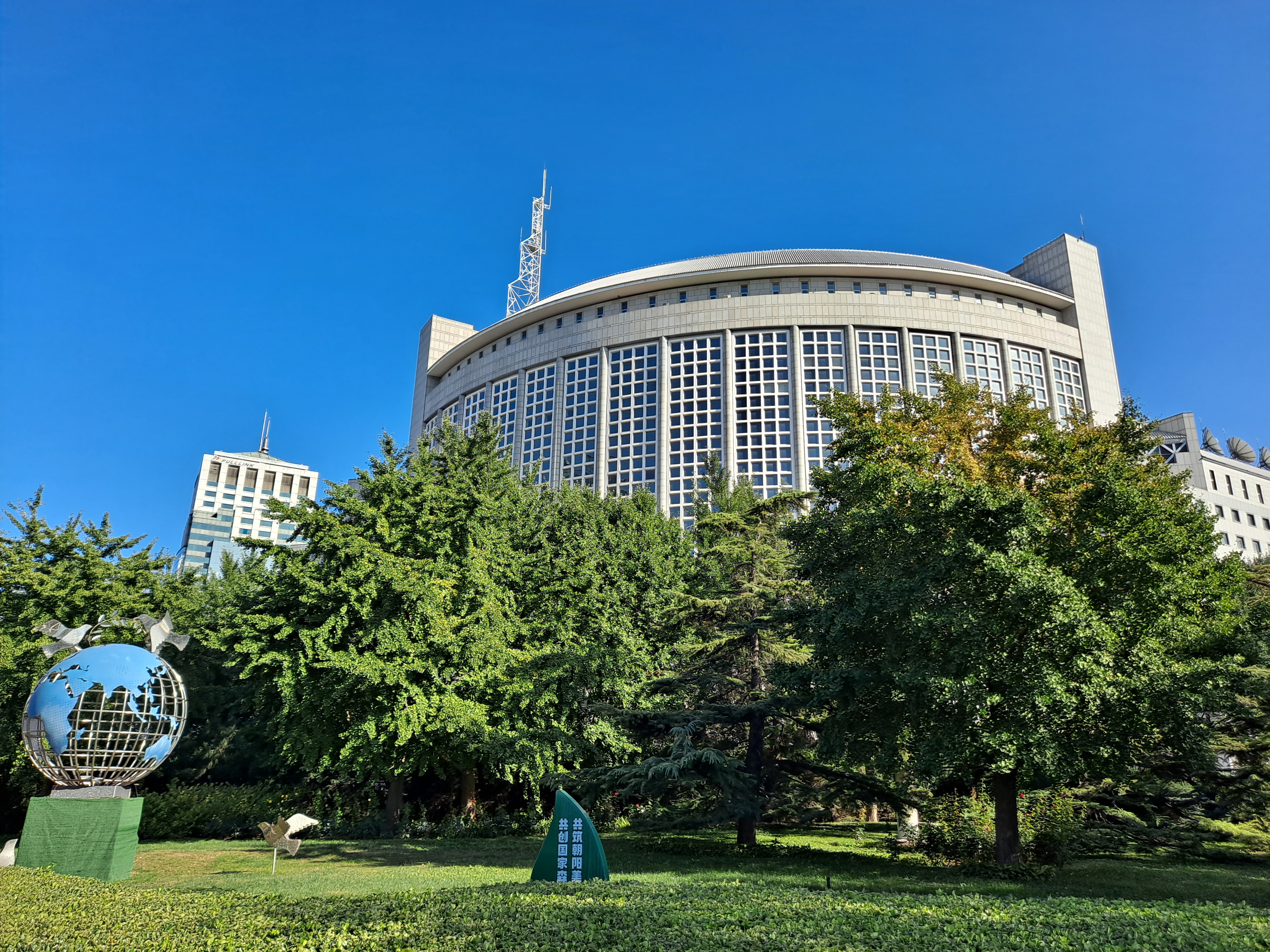
- Headquarters of the ministry

Agency overview
- Formed: September 1954; 72 years ago
- Preceding agency: Ministry of Foreign Affairs of the Central People's Government
- Type: Constituent Department of the State Council (cabinet-level executive department)
- Jurisdiction: Government of China
- Headquarters: No. 2, Chaoyangmen Nandajie, Chaoyang District, Beijing
- Minister responsible: Wang Yi, Minister of Foreign Affairs
- Deputy Ministers responsible: Ma Zhaoxu, Executive Vice Minister; Hua Chunying; Miao Deyu
- Agency executive: Qi Yu, Party Committee Secretary (ministerial-level)
- Parent agency: State Council
- Child agencies: Diplomatic missions of China; Commissioner's Office in Hong Kong / in Macau; China Foreign Affairs University; Chinese People's Association for Friendship with Foreign Countries
- Website: mfa.gov.cn/eng/

Chinese name
- Simplified Chinese: 中华人民共和国外交部
- Traditional Chinese: 中華人民共和國外交部
Transcriptions
Standard Mandarin
- Hanyu Pinyin: Zhōnghuá Rénmín Gònghéguó Wàijiāobù

Alternative Chinese name
- Chinese: 外交部
Transcriptions
Standard Mandarin
- Hanyu Pinyin: Wàijiāobù

The Ministry of Foreign Affairs of the People's Republic of China (MFA; Chinese: 中华人民共和国外交部; pinyin: Zhōnghuá Rénmín Gònghéguó Wàijiāobù) is the first-ranked executive department of the State Council of China, responsible for the country's foreign relations. It is led by the minister of foreign affairs, currently Wang Yi, who concurrently serves as the director of the Office of the Central Foreign Affairs Commission, making him China's top diplomat. The ministry is headquartered in Chaoyang, Beijing, the country's primary diplomatic quarter.

The Ministry of Foreign Affairs of the Central People's Government was established in October 1949, with Premier Zhou Enlai serving as the first foreign minister. The ministry assumed its current form in September 1954. The ministry went through turmoil during the Cultural Revolution. Under the leadership of Deng Xiaoping, the ministry was professionalized. As China's global power and diplomatic engagement grew in the 21st century, the ministry has become more important and prominent.

The MFA's primary functions include formulating foreign policy, administering the nation's diplomatic missions, representing Chinese interests at the United Nations, negotiating foreign treaties and agreements, and advising the State Council on foreign affairs. The Ministry is subordinate to the Central Foreign Affairs Commission, which decides on policy-making and led by General Secretary of the Chinese Communist Party. Foreign policies concerning the Republic of China fall under the jurisdiction of the Taiwan Affairs Office. As of 2024, the ministry maintains the largest diplomatic network in the world, with 274 diplomatic posts.

== History ==
=== Early People's Republic ===
Before the proclamation of the People's Republic of China, the Chinese Communist Party (CCP) handled foreign relations through its Foreign Affairs Group, established on 1 May 1947. The Foreign Affairs Group was abolished on 30 September 1949, and the Ministry of Foreign Affairs of the Central People's Government was established on 1 October 1949, the day of the PRC's proclamation. Zhou Enlai, also appointed as premier, became the first foreign minister of the PRC. The ministry was formally inaugurated by Zhou on 8 November 1949.

The Ministry initially had 170 staff, a number which increased to nearly 2,000 by 1960. Of the 17 ambassadors appointed abroad between October 1949 and 1952, twelve were senior military officials, nine were survivors of the Long March and only three had previously been abroad. Additionally, the new Ministry did not recruit former diplomats from the Kuomintang that opted to stay in the PRC, instead creating a new diplomatic corps entirely. The MFA of the PRC was established in September 1954, after the first meeting of the National People's Congress, and became a department of the State Council. The Ministry's importance to China's foreign policy apparatus has increased and decreased over time.

In 1956, as China's diplomat engagement increased, a West Asian and African Affairs was established; previously Western European and African affairs were handled by the same department. During this period, Zhou oversaw the professionalization and formalization of the Ministry, including establishing standard operating procedures on areas such as the Ministry's official responsibilities and training guidelines. The Ministry was hit by the Anti-Rightist Campaign, launched by Mao Zedong in 1957 after the Hundred Flowers Campaign, with its quota for finding "rightists" being around 5 percent. On 11 February 1958, Chen Yi succeeded Zhou as foreign minister.

=== Cultural Revolution ===
The Ministry personnel initially paid little attention to the Cultural Revolution when it was launched in 1966, launching a few political study sessions. However, the movement gradually caught the Ministry's attention and after Mao received a letter from a member of the Communist Party of Austria complaining about the conduct and extravagance of Chinese diplomats in the country, he instructed Chen, writing, "[R]evolutionize or there will be danger". This prompted Chen to instruct reforms to diplomatic protocols, and diplomatic mission abroad were required to promote Mao Zedong Thought, wear Mao suits and Chairman Mao badges and intensify political study sessions.

The rebels within the Ministry established the "Foreign Ministry Revolutionary Rebel Station" later in 1966 and stated their intention to overthrow the CCP committee in the Ministry. The Ministry started recalling personnel overseas back into Beijing in 1967 to take part in the Cultural Revolution, causing immense strains in China's diplomatic corps. The rebel groups attempted to take in the Ministry in August 1967, paralyzing the Ministry's Political Department for two weeks. Many of China's diplomats were sent to May Seventh Cadre Schools after their establishment in 1968 until their disestablishment in 1971. After Mao decided to restore order in the country in late 1968, Zhou started to plan bringing back normality to the Ministry, and some diplomats started to return abroad in late 1969. The Ministry-affiliated Chinese People's Institute of Foreign Affairs was also re-activated.

By 1971, with the admission of the PRC into the United Nations, the country's diplomacy began to normalize. However, the Ministry was increasingly factionalized, especially between the "Lord Qiao", associates of Qiao Guanhua, and "young girl", referring to Mao's close associates Wang Hairong and Tang Wensheng, factions. Chen Yi died on 6 January 1972, and was succeeded by Ji Pengfei as foreign minister.

=== Deng era ===
After Mao's death and the fall of the Gang of Four in 1976, Qiao was purged and succeeded by Huang Hua. After Deng Xiaoping's rise to power, diplomatic missions abroad were instructed to focus on Four Modernizations campaign.

In 1982, Hu Yaobang, then leader of the CCP, called a meeting with senior diplomats to demand the "rectification" of the Ministry, focusing on making it less ideological. The Ministry was also reformed to improve professionalism and efficiency; the number of vice ministers was reduced from ten to six in 1982, and diplomats below the rank of vice minister were automatically retired after becoming older than the age of sixty since 1983. Professional diplomats were preferred over and increasingly replaced the old military veterans. Wages were also reformed, rewarding those with higher ranks and boosting incomes of diplomats abroad. Wage and bureaucratic reforms continued during the 1990s, with many diplomatic missions cutting staff and starting to employ locals. Job descriptions were also clarified, and the promotion system standardized.

=== 21st century ===
As China's engagement with the world increased, the ministry established the Department of External Security Affairs in 2004, with its function being protecting citizens abroad. It furthermore established the Center for Consular Protection in 2007. China's rising stature also meant that the ministry worked together and sometimes competed with other institutions while conducting diplomacy, including the Ministry of Commerce, the Ministry of Public Security, and various state-owned enterprises.

The Ministry's significance in China's foreign policy establishment has increased since 2009 and it has a higher profile both domestically and internationally. From 2011 to 2018, its diplomatic budget doubled. The Ministry has become increasingly visible to foreign audiences since the proliferation of its Twitter accounts and its diplomats' increased social media activity since 2019. While previously China's embassies were subject to influence by various ministries, after 2019 reforms, the Ministry has veto power over financial and personnel decisions at Chinese embassies.

== Organization ==
The ministry is headed by the minister of foreign affairs, who is appointed by the National People's Congress or its Standing Committee after a nomination by the premier. The minister serves as the nation's principal representative abroad. The ministry leads the work of diplomatic missions of China abroad, the largest in the world as of 2024 with 274 diplomatic posts. More specifically, it includes 173 embassies, 91 consulates, 8 permanent missions and 2 other representations.

=== Departments ===
The ministry consists of 29 individual offices, including departments responsible for specific regions, policy areas, as well as administration of the Ministry itself. Each office is headed by a director-general with at least two deputy directors-general. The offices are:

- The General Office (办公厅): Circulates communications within the Ministry, manages information technology systems, and coordinates with foreign parties in response to crises.
- The Department of Policy Planning (政策规划司): Responsible for research, analysis, and policy formulation related to international affairs. Writes speeches and other major foreign policy documents. Conducts work relevant to Chinese diplomatic history.
- The Department of Asian Affairs (亚洲司)
- The Department of West Asian and North African Affairs (西亚北非司)
- The Department of African Affairs (非洲司)
- The Department of European-Central Asian Affairs (欧亚司)
- The Department of European Affairs (欧洲司)
- The Department of North American and Oceanian Affairs (北美大洋洲司)
- The Department of Latin American and Caribbean Affairs (拉丁美洲司)
- The Department of International Organizations and Conferences (国际司)
- The Department of International Economic Affairs (国际经济司)
- The Department of Arms Control (军控司)
- The Department of Treaty and Law (条约法律司)
- The Department of Boundary and Ocean Affairs (边界与海洋事务司)
- The Department of Press, Communication and Public Diplomacy (新闻司): Manages press relations and public presentation of Chinese foreign policy. Headed by spokeswoman Mao Ning.
- The Protocol Department (礼宾司): Handles matters related to protocol in diplomatic events and ceremonies.
- The Department of Consular Affairs (领事司)
- The Department of Hong Kong, Macao and Taiwan Affairs (港澳台司)
- The Department of Translation and Interpretation (翻译司): Manages and provides training for interpretation and translation work in English, Spanish, French, and Portuguese at international events and for state diplomatic events and documents. Regional departments are responsible for general translation and interpretation work within their respective regions.
- The Department of Foreign Affairs Management (外事管理司): Drafts and oversees regulations related to foreign affairs for sub-national entities such as local governments, state-owned enterprises, and other bodies of the State Council.
- The Department of External Security Affairs (涉外安全事务司)
- The Department of Personnel (干部司)
- The Bureau for Retired Personnel (离退休干部局)
- The Administrative Department (行政司): Oversees planning, construction, real estate, valuable assets (antiques and artifacts), housing, infrastructure, and overall management in overseas missions.
- The Department of Finance (财务司)
- The Department for Diplomatic Missions Abroad (国外工作局) and the Department for Party-related Affairs (机关委员会): one institution with two names
- Office of Leading Group for Conducting Inspections in the Foreign Ministry (外交部巡视工作领导小组办公室): Overseas disciplinary investigations and policy in accordance with Chinese Communist Party regulations.
- The Bureau of Archives (档案馆)
- The Department of Services for Foreign Ministry Home and Overseas Offices (服务局): Oversees logistics for diplomatic missions abroad.

The ministry maintains Commissioner Offices in the special administrative regions (SAR) of Hong Kong and Macau, which handle the foreign affairs of the SARs. The ministry also operates the Chinese People's Institute of Foreign Affairs (CPIFA) for "people-to-people" diplomatic activities, and jointly administers the China Foreign Affairs University together with the Ministry of Education. The ministry is also involved in the foreign aid process through administering humanitarian assistance China provides.

=== Personnel ===
The ministry has over 5,000 diplomats and support personnel as of at least 2024. From its outset, the ministry has required that its diplomats operate in pairs, although enforcement of the rule has varied over time. Inside embassies and consulates, CCP branch organizations monitor the behavior of diplomats. Ministry personnel are typically graduates of well-regarded Beijing and Shanghai universities, mostly Peking University, Tsinghua University, China Foreign Affairs University, and Beijing Foreign Studies University. Political loyalty remains the ministry's most important criterion in selecting recruits. Following the passage of the People's Republic of China Diplomatic Missions in Foreign Countries Act, the minimum age for diplomats posted overseas was raised from 18 to 23.

== Headquarters ==
In 1966, the ministry moved its headquarters to a set of buildings in the Dongjiaomin Lane, East of the Forbidden City, after an earthquake damaged the old building. In 1997 the ministry moved to its current headquarters located in Chaoyang District, Beijing, the country's primary diplomatic quarter.

== See also ==
- Ambassadors of China
- Spokesperson of the Ministry of Foreign Affairs of China
