= Ching-i Tu =

Chinese academic

Ching-I Tu
- Born: May 13, 1935 (age 91); Nanking, China
- Education: National Taiwan University; University of Washington
- Occupation: Professor at Rutgers University
- Spouse: Sabrina S. Wang
- Children: Stephen Shih-chung, Sylvia Shih-yun

Ching-I Tu (simplified Chinese: 涂经诒; traditional Chinese: 涂經詒; pinyin: Tú Jīng-yí; born 13 May 1935 in Nanking, China) is an expert on classical Chinese poetry, Chinese intellectual history, Chinese hermeneutics, and cultural changes in modern East Asia. He was a professor and founding chair of the Department of East Asian Languages and Cultures at Rutgers University and the founding director of the Confucius Institute of Rutgers University (CIRU). Tu has written and edited several books and authored a number of academic articles.

== Biography ==
Tu was born in Nanking, China in 1935. He graduated from National Taiwan University with B.A. in 1958 and received a Ph.D. from the University of Washington in 1967. He married his wife, Sabrina S. Wang, on 14 June 1970. He was a visiting professor at University of Hawaii in Honolulu, from 1971 to 1972, and then at National Taiwan University in Taipei, from 1974 to 1975.

Tu was the first faculty member to teach Chinese language at Rutgers University. He established the Chinese program, and was important in the development of Chinese studies, Asian studies and Asian-American studies at Rutgers. He was initiated the introduction of Japanese in the 1980s and later instrumental in the introduction of Korean and Hindi. at Rutgers University.

Tu also initiated the Rutgers Multimedia Chinese Teaching System (RMCTS), which received the 2008 World Languages Award from Multimedia Educational Resource for Learning and Online Teaching (MERLOT.) In 2007, Tu initiated the Confucius Institute of Rutgers University (CIRU) and served as the founding director until 2017.

== Selected publications ==
=== Author ===
- Poetic Remarks in the Human World (1970), revised edition (2016)
- Anthology of Chinese Literature (1972)
- Readings in Chinese Classical Literature (1981)

=== Editor ===
- Tradition and Creativity: Essays on East Asian Civilization (Proceedings of the Lecture Series on East Asian Civilization) (1986)
- Classics and Interpretations: The Hermeneutic Traditions in Chinese Culture (2000)
- Interpretation and Intellectual Change: Chinese Hermeneutics in Historical Perspective (2004)

=== Co-Editor ===
- Publication Series on Chinese Culture, Confucius Institute of Rutgers University (CIRU) (2010–2019)

=== Translator ===
- Poetic remarks in the human world, Jen Chien Tz'u Hua (1969)
