= Luo Xiwen =

Chinese engineer (born 1945)

- 罗锡文
- Born: 2 December 1945 (age 80); Zhuzhou, Hunan, China
- Education: Huazhong University of Science and Technology; South China Agricultural University
- Scientific career
- Fields: Agricultural mechanization
- Workplaces: South China Agricultural University

Chinese name
- Simplified Chinese: 罗锡文
- Traditional Chinese: 羅錫文
Transcriptions
Standard Mandarin
- Hanyu Pinyin: Luó Xīwén

Luo Xiwen (born 2 December 1945) is a Chinese engineer in the fields of agricultural mechanization. He is a member of the Chinese Academy of Engineering. He is the chairman of the Chinese Society for Agricultural Machinery and honorary chairman of the Chinese Society of Agricultural Engineering. He is a member of the American Society of Agricultural and Biological Engineers.

== Biography ==
Luo was born into a peasant family in Zhuzhou, Hunan, on 2 December 1945. After graduating from Huazhong University of Science and Technology in 1969, he was despatched to the Tongren Agricultural Machinery Factory in southwest China's Guizhou province. After he earned a master's degree in agricultural mechanization from South China Agricultural University in 1982, he stayed at the university and worked as associate professor (1987), full professor (1992), and doctoral supervisor (1993). He was a visiting scholar at Virginia Polytechnic Institute and State University and Virginia State University from October 1987 to July 1988 and the University of Kentucky from August 1988 to July 1989. He was appointed director of the Department of Agricultural Engineering, South China Agricultural University, in June 1992, concurrently holding the dean of the School of Engineering position. He was its vice president in May 1996, and held that office until May 2006. On 28 May 2021, he became leader of the Expert Guidance Group of Crop Production Mechanization of the Ministry of Agriculture and Rural Affairs.

== Works ==
- 我国农业全程全面机械化发展面临的新挑战和应对策略 [New Challenges and Countermeasures for the Development of Full Mechanization of Agriculture in China] (in Chinese). Beijing: China Agricultural Publishing House Co., Ltd. 2020. ISBN 9787109260382.
- 食物生产方式向机械化和信息化转变战略研究 [Strategic Research on the Transformation of Food Production Mode to Mechanization and Informatization] (in Chinese). Beijing: Science Press. 2017. ISBN 9787030549013.
- 农业机械化生产学 [Agricultural Mechanization Production] (in Chinese). Beijing: China Agricultural Publishing House. 2002. ISBN 9787109075641.

== Honours and awards ==
- 2009 Member of the Chinese Academy of Engineering (CAE)
- 2020 Member of the (International Academy of Agricultural and Biosystems Engineering (IAABE)
