= Xiaoyuan Liu =

- Occupations: Historian, author and academic

Academic background
- Education: Diploma., History; MA., History; PhD., History; Postdoc
- Alma mater: Beijing Teachers College; University of Iowa

Academic work
- Institutions: University of Virginia

Xiaoyuan Liu is a historian, author, and academic most known for his work in the field of East Asian international history and ethnopolitical history of 20th century China. He is the David Dean 21st Century Professor of Asian Studies and Professor of History in the Corcoran Department of History at the University of Virginia.

Liu's publications comprise journal articles and books, such as Frontier Passages: Ethnopolitics and the Rise of Chinese Communism, 1921-1945 and A Partnership for Disorder: China, the United States, and Their Policies for the Postwar Disposition of the Japanese Empire, 1941–1945. He has received awards, including the Outstanding Career Achievement in Research Award from the Iowa State University in 2011 and the 2021 Academic Excellence Award from Chinese Historians in the United States.

== Education and early career ==
In 1974, Liu enrolled at Beijing Teachers College earning a Diploma in History in 1977, and also served as a lecturer from 1977 to 1982. Between 1982 and 1990, under the mentorship of historian Lawrence E. Gelfand, he pursued a doctoral degree in history at the University of Iowa. From 1997 to 1999, he received postdoctoral training at Harvard University's Fairbank Center for Chinese Studies, supported by a Social Science Research Council–MacArthur Foundation Postdoctoral Fellowship.

== Career ==
Liu began his academic career in the United States as a visiting assistant professor at the University of Chicago in 1990, followed by a teaching position at the State University of New York at Potsdam. In 2000, he joined Iowa State University and worked there till 2013, concurrently holding the Asian Policy Fellow position at the Woodrow Wilson Center from 2002 to 2003 and serving as a visiting professor of history at Harvard University from 2007 to 2008. From 2009 to 2019, he held the position of Zijiang Professor of History at East China Normal University in Shanghai, China, and since 2014, he has been the David Dean 21st Century Professor of Asian Studies at the University of Virginia.

== Scholarship ==
Liu's research has spanned East Asian international history, US–Chinese relations in the 20th century, and China's ethnic and frontier affairs in international politics. His early work studied how China's resistance to Japan during World War II, along with its alliances with Western powers, transformed its international status and positioned it for a leadership role in global and Asian affairs. Later, extending his research to China's ethnic frontiers such as Mongolia and Tibet where the divide between domestic and foreign affairs became blurred, he examined Chinese Nationalist and Communist ethnopolitical practices and interactions with frontier peoples and foreign powers.

Liu has authored and edited several books centered on Chinese history and foreign relations. In 1996, he published his first book, A Partnership for Disorder: China, the United States, and Their Policies for the Postwar Disposition of the Japanese Empire, 1941–1945, exploring the conflicting American and Chinese foreign policy strategies during World War II regarding Japan and Japan-occupied Asian territories, revealing how their disagreements impeded effective cooperation for post-war governance and stability of Asian countries and the Asian-Pacific region. William Stueck, in his book review, stated, "...Liu has written a fine book that should dominate the literature on an important topic for a long time to come." Later, in Frontier Passages: Ethnopolitics and the Rise of Chinese Communism, 1921-1945, he analyzed the Chinese Communist Party's conceptualization of China's ethnic minorities and relevant policies from the party's establishment to the end of World War II. His study highlighted the Chinese Communists' changing ethnopolitics from a revolutionary orientation that favored self-determination among minorities such as the Mongols, Tibetans, and Hui, to a national strategy that stressed unity of the "Chinese Nation" over separatism among non-Han groups. Michael Clarke commented, "...Frontier Passages presents a fascinating, persuasive and innovative account of a somewhat neglected dimension of modern Chinese and CCP history..." Furthermore, he authored Reins of Liberation: An Entangled History of Mongolian Independence, Chinese Territoriality, and Great Power Hegemony, 1911–1950 which assessed the Mongolian question to illustrate how war, revolution, and great-power rivalries influenced the development of nationhood and territoriality in China from 1911 to 1949. The book was described by Alicia Campi as "an essential tome for contemporary Chinese historians."

Liu's 2010 book Recast All Under Heaven: Revolution, War, Diplomacy and Frontier China in the 20th Century looked into the transformation of China's frontier regions through domestic and international developments from the imperial era to the national period. In 2020, he wrote To the End of Revolution: The Chinese Communist Party and Tibet, 1949–1959, evaluating Beijing's Tibet policy in the 1950s and investigating how the Chinese Communist Party integrated Tibet into its system amid ethnic, religious, and political challenges. According to Jeffrey Wasserstrom's review for The Wall Street Journal, the book "mines official documents—from speeches by top leaders to minutes of committee meetings—to reveal the debates and divides that shaped the story of Tibet during the 1950s and places the experiment's failure into a sophisticated analytic frame." Together with Frontier Passages and Reins of Liberation, To the End of Revolution has completed his trilogy on China's frontier history during the 20th century.

== Awards and honors ==
- 2011 – Outstanding Career Achievement in Research Award, Iowa State University
- 2021 – Academic Excellence Award, Chinese Historians in the United States

== Bibliography ==
=== Selected books ===
- A Partnership for Disorder: China, the United States, and Their Policies for the Postwar Disposition of the Japanese Empire, 1941–1945 (1996) ISBN 978-0-521-55099-4
- Chinese Nationalism: Historical and Recent Cases (2001) ISBN 978-0-313-31511-4
- Exploring Nationalisms of China: Themes and Conflicts (2002) ISBN 978-0-313-31512-1
- Frontier Passages: Ethnopolitics and the Rise of Chinese Communism, 1921-1945 (2004) ISBN 978-0-8047-4960-2
- Reins of Liberation: An Entangled History of Mongolian Independence, Chinese Territoriality, and Great Power Hegemony, 1911–1950 (2006) ISBN 978-0-8047-5426-2
- Recast All Under Heaven: Revolution, War, Diplomacy and Frontier China in the 20th Century (2010) ISBN 978-1-4411-3489-9
- Frontier China: Twentieth-Century Peripheral and Interethnic Relations (2016) ISBN 978-962-996-710-9
- To the End of Revolution: The Chinese Communist Party and Tibet, 1949–1959 (2020) ISBN 978-0-231-19527-0

=== Selected articles ===
- Liu, X. (1992). Sino-American Diplomacy over Korea during World War II. Journal of American-East Asian Relations, 223–264.
- Liu, X. (1999). China and the Issue of Postwar Indochina in the Second World War. Modern Asian Studies, 33(2), 445–482.
- Liu, X. (1999). The Kuomintang and the ‘Mongolian Question’ in the Chinese Civil War, 1945–1949. Inner Asia, 1(2), 169–194.
- Liu, X. (2012). Entering the Cold War and other “Wars”: The Tibetan Experience. The Chinese Historical Review, 19(1), 47–64.
- Liu, X. (2015). Friend or Foe: India as Perceived by Beijing's Foreign Policy Analysts in the 1950s. China Review, 15(1), 117–143.
- Liu, X. (2017). Genesis and development of Chinese Communist territorial ethics, 1921–1949. Twenty-First Century, 2017(4), 13–34.
- Liu, X. (2022–2023). Normalization of the China-Mongolia relations: The Journey of a Political Concept, in Two Parts. Twenty-First Century, 2022(12), 37–48; 2023(2), 11–26.
