= Fang Fuquan =

Chinese mathematician

- 方复全

President of Capital Normal University, China
- Incumbent
- Assumed office September 2021

Personal details
- Born: October 1964 (age 61) Tongcheng, Anhui, China
- Scientific career
- Education: Huazhong University of Science and Technology
- Fields: Mathematics
- Workplaces: Capital Normal University

Fang Fuquan (simplified Chinese: 方复全; traditional Chinese: 方復全; pinyin: Fāng Fùquán; born October 1964) is a Chinese mathematician. He is one of the leading mathematicians in the fields of geometry and topology in China. He is a delegate to the 13th National People's Congress.

== Biography ==
Fang was born in Tongcheng, Anhui in October 1964. His father was a small official in his hometown during the Republic of China (1912-1949). Because of his record, he was denounced as a "counterrevolutionary" and suffered political persecution during the Cultural Revolution. He entered Huazhong University of Science and Technology in September 1983, majoring in applied mathematics at the Department of Mathematics, where he graduated in 1986. After a short period of teaching at his alma mater, he earned his doctor's degree from Jilin University in 1991. Fang pursued advanced studies in Germany, he did post-doctoral research at Johannes Gutenberg University Mainz from 1993 to 1994.

He returned to China in May 1994 and that year became associate professor at Nankai University. He was a visiting scholar of Max Planck Society from October 1995 to June 1996 and then Institut des Hautes Études Scientifiques from July 1996 to June 1997.

He joined the faculty of Capital Normal University in November 2004 and was promoted to dean of the Department of Mathematics in July 2015. In July 2016 he was appointed vice-president of Capital Normal University, a position at vice-ministerial level.

He was elected as a member of the Chinese Academy of Sciences on November 28, 2017.

== Papers ==
- Fang Fuquan; Xiaochun Rong (2007). "Curvature, diameter, rational homotopy type and cohomology rings". Duke Math. J. 107: 135–158. doi:10.1215/S0012-7094-01-10717-5.
- Fang Fuquan (2001). "Smooth group actions on 4-manifolds and Seiberg-Witten theory". Diff. Geom. Appl. 14: 1–14. doi:10.1016/s0926-2245(00)00036-x.
- Fang Fuquan (2002). "Orientable 4-manifolds topologically embed in R7". Topology. 41 (5): 927–930. doi:10.1016/s0040-9383(01)00002-7.
- Fang Fuquan; Xiaochun Rong (2002). "Second twisted Betti numbers and the convergence of collapsing Riemannian manifolds". Invent. Math. 150 (1): 161–209. Bibcode:2002InMat.150...61F. doi:10.1007/s00222-002-0230-2. S2CID 18755794.
- Fang Fuquan; S. Druck; S. Firmo (2002). "Fixed points of discrete nilpotent group actions on S2". Ann. Inst. Fourier. 52 (4): 1075–1091. arXiv:math/0109015. doi:10.5802/aif.1912. S2CID 14534108.

== Awards ==
- 2014 Second Class Prize of State Natural Science Award
