= List of named minor planets: W =

This is a partial list of named minor planets, containing all those starting with the letter W, as of 9 November 2026. It is ordered in a case-insensitive, alphabetical manner and contains a total of 590 entries. Grey minor planets have no article and redirect to the list of minor planets instead (see List of minor planets § Main index).

== W ==
- 30300 Waagen
- 2453 Wabash
- 10585 Wabi-Sabi
- 8501 Wachholz
- 1704 Wachmann
- 157541 Wachter
- 12861 Wacker
- 4710 Wade
- 210983 Wadeparker
- 121032 Wadesisler
- 8356 Wadhwa
- 21387 Wafakhalil
- 22562 Wage
- 3110 Wagman
- 3992 Wagner
- 9725 Wainscoat
- 5128 Wakabayashi
- 43803 Wakakinosakura
- 8399 Wakamatsu
- 346998 Wakamura
- 41199 Wakanaootaki
- 6208 Wakata
- 12415 Wakatatakayo
- 17038 Wake
- 7627 Wakenokiyomaro
- 5847 Wakiya
- 5960 Wakkanai
- 3734 Waland
- 1695 Walbeck
- 25942 Walborn
- 31956 Wald
- 18021 Waldman
- 32561 Waldron
- 11005 Waldtrudering
- 25019 Walentosky
- 15045 Walesdymond
- 4629 Walford
- 1260 Walhalla
- 1417 Walinskia
- 6372 Walker
- 205599 Walkowicz
- 877 Walküre
- 21903 Wallace
- 6670 Wallach
- 1153 Wallenbergia
- 2114 Wallenquist
- 23477 Wallenstadt
- 79410 Wallerius
- 987 Wallia
- 66661 Wallin
- 22630 Wallmuth
- 3198 Wallonia
- 256 Walpurga
- 1946 Walraven
- 17506 Walschap
- 7398 Walsh
- 7987 Walshkevin
- 23014 Walstein
- 4266 Waltari
- 8021 Walter
- 3145 Walter Adams
- 9132 Walteranderson
- 172317 Walterbos
- 19178 Walterbothe
- 15968 Waltercugno
- 386528 Walterfürtig
- 25680 Walterhansen
- 2749 Walterhorn
- 9187 Walterkröll
- 246153 Waltermaria
- 117757 Waltermassey
- 168638 Waltersiegmund
- 157015 Walterstraube
- 30080 Walterworman
- 54932 Waltharris
- 8811 Waltherschmadel
- 22998 Waltimyer
- 890 Waltraut
- 42837 Waltrobinson
- 19162 Wambsganss
- 33681 Wamsley
- 10657 Wanach
- 9484 Wanambi
- 1057 Wanda
- 10428 Wanders
- 15312 Wandt
- 20778 Wangchaohao
- 26680 Wangchristi
- 17693 Wangdaheng
- 192353 Wangdazhong
- 210231 Wangdemin
- 26688 Wangenevieve
- 14558 Wangganchang
- 25573 Wanghaoyu
- 28305 Wangjiayi
- 441374 Wangjingxiu
- 21041 Wangjinsong
- 16944 Wangler
- 10192 Wanglizhe
- 25577 Wangmanqiang
- 3171 Wangshouguan
- 137315 Wangshouwu
- 172318 Wangshui
- 66885 Wangxiaomo
- 207716 Wangxichan
- 4913 Wangxuan
- 355704 Wangyinglai
- 21770 Wangyiran
- 46669 Wangyongzhi
- 23759 Wangzhaoxin
- 718629 Wangzhenru
- 43259 Wangzhenyi
- 18593 Wangzhongcheng
- 18291 Wani
- 5762 Wänke
- 289608 Wanli
- 11807 Wannberg
- 13044 Wannes
- 31283 Wanruomeng
- 33523 Warashina
- 6027 Waratah
- 28019 Warchal
- 2276 Warck
- 4908 Ward
- 11797 Warell
- 133854 Wargetz
- 20762 Wargnier
- 6701 Warhol
- 12633 Warmenhoven
- 30155 Warmuth
- 8734 Warner
- 18862 Warot
- 5597 Warren
- 75836 Warrenastro
- 21671 Warrener
- 5478 Wartburg
- 9350 Waseda
- 9063 Washi
- 886 Washingtonia
- 7274 Washioyama
- 5756 Wassenbergh
- 4765 Wasserburg
- 10242 Wasserkuppe
- 2660 Wasserman
- 4783 Wasson
- 29979 Wastyk
- 11827 Wasyuzan
- 4155 Watanabe
- 1645 Waterfield
- 30835 Waterloo
- 1822 Waterman
- 27660 Waterwayuni
- 469366 Watkins
- 115492 Watonga
- 729 Watsonia
- 5961 Watt
- 133009 Watters
- 7784 Watterson
- 1798 Watts
- 1352 Wawel
- 333259 Wayland
- 33682 Waylonreid
- 13840 Wayneanderson
- 50721 Waynebailey
- 13425 Waynebrown
- 13880 Wayneclark
- 8996 Waynedwards
- 14003 Waynegilmore
- 176103 Waynejohnson
- 8482 Wayneolm
- 14597 Waynerichie
- 19816 Wayneseyfert
- 38036 Waynewarren
- 11425 Wearydunlop
- 29198 Weathers
- 29633 Weatherwax
- 3107 Weaver
- 3041 Webb
- 199574 Webbert
- 4152 Weber
- 4529 Webern
- 12431 Webster
- 11160 Wechsler
- 7587 Weckmann
- 48470 Wedemeyer
- 5057 Weeks
- 12196 Weems
- 283142 Weena
- 5151 Weerstra
- 29227 Wegener
- 27588 Wegley
- 115326 Wehinger
- 204786 Wehlau
- 34567 Weidekoo
- 3639 Weidenschilling
- 199741 Weidner
- 14100 Weierstrass
- 18905 Weigan
- 9315 Weigel
- 200255 Weigle
- 207931 Weihai
- 8327 Weihenmayer
- 11899 Weill
- 3539 Weimar
- 196540 Weinbaum
- 6036 Weinberg
- 7114 Weinek
- 183182 Weinheim
- 4085 Weir
- 18680 Weirather
- 2802 Weisell
- 30955 Weiser
- 17050 Weiskopf
- 7571 Weisse Rose
- 22168 Weissflog
- 341317 Weisshaidinger
- 3197 Weissman
- 30112 Weistrop
- 33991 Weixunjing
- 13531 Weizsäcker
- 2405 Welch
- 13718 Welcker
- 5464 Weller
- 304557 Welling
- 33419 Wellman
- 4958 Wellnitz
- 1721 Wells
- 13437 Wellton-Persson
- 85198 Weltenburg
- 3682 Welther
- 31268 Welty
- 6468 Welzenbach
- 15425 Welzl
- 1950 Wempe
- 216343 Wenchang
- 161715 Wenchuan
- 363018 Wenda
- 6485 Wendeesther
- 1438 Wendeline
- 15268 Wendelinefroger
- 12995 Wendellmendell
- 2993 Wendy
- 35768 Wendybauer
- 32110 Wendycaldwell
- 5662 Wendycalvin
- 107638 Wendyfreedman
- 45594 Wendyrichard
- 30111 Wendyslijk
- 133814 Wenjengko
- 32047 Wenjiali
- 14147 Wenlingshuguang
- 19470 Wenpingchen
- 145545 Wensayling
- 20585 Wentworth
- 26694 Wenxili
- 16122 Wenyicai
- 27101 Wenyucao
- 58607 Wenzel
- 600432 Weöressándor
- 20960 Weratschnig
- 381048 Werber
- 322574 Werckmeister
- 621 Werdandi
- 12244 Werfel
- 226 Weringia
- 13357 Werkhoven
- 3891 Werner
- 21989 Werntz
- 1302 Werra
- 13559 Werth
- 178294 Wertheimer
- 9281 Weryk
- 25513 Weseley
- 10019 Wesleyfraser
- 17785 Wesleyfuller
- 260601 Wesselényi
- 1945 Wesselink
- 2017 Wesson
- 2022 West
- 138445 Westenburger
- 9498 Westerbork
- 5105 Westerhout
- 2902 Westerlund
- 31674 Westermann
- 10253 Westerwald
- 28602 Westfall
- 12437 Westlane
- 28852 Westonbraun
- 25434 Westonia
- 17236 Westover
- 930 Westphalia
- 15622 Westrich
- 2128 Wetherill
- 90429 Wetmore
- 90709 Wettin
- 72802 Wetton
- 38270 Wettzell
- 19294 Weymouth
- 17258 Whalen
- 31555 Wheeler
- 518886 Wheelock
- 1940 Whipple
- 198971 Whitacre
- 7948 Whitaker
- 10730 White
- 63498 Whitehead
- 144907 Whitehorne
- 4036 Whitehouse
- 17612 Whiteknight
- 18839 Whiteley
- 17942 Whiterabbit
- 12863 Whitfield
- 2301 Whitford
- 28667 Whithagins
- 115312 Whither
- 4779 Whitley
- 4346 Whitney
- 249519 Whitneyclavin
- 15057 Whitson
- 931 Whittemora
- 44217 Whittle
- 27267 Wiberg
- 7103 Wichmann
- 3899 Wichterle
- 25875 Wickramasekara
- 19833 Wickwar
- 20606 Widemann
- 21564 Widmanstätten
- 3721 Widorn
- 10734 Wieck
- 15068 Wiegert
- 8108 Wieland
- 4548 Wielen
- 173094 Wielicki
- 18182 Wiener
- 178263 Wienphilo
- 41795 Wiens
- 509018 Wiese
- 144096 Wiesendangen
- 69275 Wiesenthal
- 25885 Wiesinger
- 11916 Wiesloch
- 8440 Wigeon
- 4099 Wiggins
- 5161 Wightman
- 15304 Wikberg
- 274301 Wikipedia
- 16947 Wikrent
- 2412 Wil
- 15109 Wilber
- 11247 Wilburwright
- 1941 Wild
- 117506 Wildberg
- 17493 Wildcat
- 9999 Wiles
- 611326 Wilfredbuck
- 21711 Wilfredwong
- 15169 Wilfriedboland
- 103770 Wilfriedlang
- 392 Wilhelmina
- 14366 Wilhelmraabe
- 4826 Wilhelms
- 48456 Wilhelmwien
- 4117 Wilke
- 75562 Wilkening
- 1688 Wilkens
- 16797 Wilkerson
- 5314 Wilkickia
- 14969 Willacather
- 7620 Willaert
- 11427 Willemkolff
- 34297 Willfrazer
- 39184 Willgrundy
- 16258 Willhayes
- 33263 Willhutch
- 270373 William
- 268115 Williamalbrecht
- 23172 Williamartin
- 21609 Williamcaleb
- 6613 Williamcarl
- 305344 Williamcolgrove
- 3894 Williamcooke
- 90317 Williamcutlip
- 8031 Williamdana
- 246333 Williamdane
- 12597 Williamdaniel
- 6756 Williamfeldman
- 129138 Williamfrost
- 27054 Williamgoddard
- 31501 Williamhang
- 25082 Williamhodge
- 9340 Williamholden
- 5747 Williamina
- 246841 Williamirace
- 31507 Williamjin
- 24464 Williamkalb
- 8030 Williamknight
- 40457 Williamkuhn
- 26671 Williamlopes
- 128228 Williammarsh
- 25163 Williammcdonald
- 28037 Williammonts
- 6012 Williammurdoch
- 130314 Williamodonnell
- 45298 Williamon
- 27556 Williamprem
- 34323 Williamrose
- 1763 Williams
- 3641 Williams Bay
- 50855 Williamschultz
- 29432 Williamscott
- 13339 Williamsmith
- 150035 Williamson
- 5763 Williamtobin
- 10316 Williamturner
- 353745 Williamunruh
- 129962 Williamverts
- 11418 Williamwang
- 211378 Williamwarneke
- 22872 Williamweber
- 27458 Williamwhite
- 227427 Williamwren
- 13113 Williamyeats
- 32101 Williamyin
- 12137 Williefowler
- 618349 Williekoorts
- 51829 Williemccool
- 22786 Willipete
- 13730 Willis
- 5445 Williwaw
- 25481 Willjaysun
- 34336 Willjenkins
- 22498 Willman
- 22005 Willnelson
- 53025 Willnoel
- 23712 Willpatrick
- 15151 Wilmacherup
- 2465 Wilson
- 4015 Wilson–Harrington
- 391257 Wilwheaton
- 5555 Wimberly
- 12132 Wimfröger
- 12175 Wimhermans
- 10135 Wimhermsen
- 747 Winchester
- 11847 Winckelmann
- 15606 Winer
- 18730 Wingip
- 1556 Wingolfia
- 1575 Winifred
- 22584 Winigleason
- 276389 Winkel
- 6473 Winkler
- 18851 Winmesser
- 215423 Winnecke
- 99863 Winnewisser
- 17262 Winokur
- 8270 Winslow
- 103734 Winstonscott
- 15111 Winters
- 43669 Winterthur
- 19384 Winton
- 2044 Wirt
- 227770 Wischnewski
- 3402 Wisdom
- 717 Wisibada
- 4588 Wislicenus
- 2256 Wiśniewski
- 25348 Wisniowiecki
- 4295 Wisse
- 16022 Wissnergross
- 20764 Witasse
- 90487 Witherspoon
- 10653 Witsen
- 2732 Witt
- 90712 Wittelsbach
- 11349 Witten
- 279723 Wittenberg
- 11404 Wittig
- 4299 WIYN
- 852 Wladilena
- 229836 Wladimarinello
- 11461 Wladimirneumann
- 324787 Włodarczyk
- 13368 Wlodekofman
- 2155 Wodan
- 4608 Wodehouse
- 53029 Wodetzky
- 32724 Woerlitz
- 21846 Wojakowski
- 676734 Wójcicki
- 32089 Wojtania
- 13908 Wölbern
- 7686 Wolfernst
- 5674 Wolff
- 576373 Wolfgangbusch
- 236111 Wolfgangbüttner
- 234292 Wolfganghansch
- 4723 Wolfgangmattig
- 13093 Wolfgangpauli
- 266887 Wolfgangries
- 827 Wolfiana
- 14412 Wolflojewski
- 18520 Wolfratshausen
- 312861 Wolfslehner
- 20304 Wolfson
- 30829 Wolfwacker
- 293499 Wolinski
- 8316 Wolkenstein
- 90481 Wollstonecraft
- 41004 Wolner
- 21699 Wolpert
- 805997 Wolszczan
- 1795 Woltjer
- 229614 Womack
- 6827 Wombat
- 75555 Wonaszek
- 27061 Wong
- 34815 Wongfaye
- 41742 Wongkakui
- 4651 Wongkwancheng
- 88874 Wongshingsheuk
- 31907 Wongsumming
- 39372 Wongtzewah
- 32438 Wonyonghan
- 1660 Wood
- 13732 Woodall
- 7549 Woodard
- 17241 Wooden
- 28785 Woodjohn
- 13001 Woodney
- 13038 Woolston
- 7550 Woolum
- 11195 Woomera
- 21630 Wootensmith
- 22994 Workman
- 7011 Worley
- 100046 Worms
- 9742 Worpswede
- 14382 Woszczyk
- 2218 Wotho
- 34703 Wozniakiewicz
- 690 Wratislavia
- 19721 Wray
- 3062 Wren
- 1747 Wright
- 33017 Wroński
- 1765 Wrubel
- 2705 Wu
- 2752 Wu Chien-Shiung
- 10976 Wubbena
- 483488 Wudeshi
- 76713 Wudia
- 13651 Wugang
- 3206 Wuhan
- 56088 Wuheng
- 667772 Wuhsinheng
- 34028 Wuhuiyi
- 3987 Wujek
- 26727 Wujunjun
- 9221 Wuliangyong
- 546845 Wulumuqiyizhong
- 17606 Wumengchao
- 23274 Wuminchun
- 20347 Wunderlich
- 11040 Wundt
- 22499 Wunibaldkamm
- 75223 Wupatki
- 26323 Wuqijin
- 1785 Wurm
- 5904 Württemberg
- 317452 Wurukang
- 256892 Wutayou
- 281880 Wuweiren
- 7683 Wuwenjun
- 3570 Wuyeesun
- 175718 Wuzhengyi
- 207809 Wuzuze
- 32060 Wyattpontius
- 5090 Wyeth
- 15160 Wygoda
- 29845 Wykrota
- 7521 Wylezalek
- 126444 Wylie
- 34388 Wylonis
- 39137 Wymanwong
- 301623 Wynn-Williams
- 65866 Wynneozrics
- 18128 Wysner
- 440794 Wytrzyszczak
back to top

== See also ==
- List of minor planet discoverers
- List of observatory codes
- Meanings of minor planet names § Index
