= 987 Wallia =

Main-belt asteroid

Discovery
- Discovered by: K. Reinmuth
- Discovery site: Heidelberg Obs.
- Discovery date: 23 October 1922

Designations
- Named after: Name picked from the almanac Lahrer Hinkender Bote
- Alternative designations: A922 UB · 1922 MR; A899 PJ
- Minor planet category: main-belt · (outer) background

Orbital characteristics
- Epoch 31 May 2020 (JD 2459000.5)
- Uncertainty parameter 0
- Observation arc: 97.20 yr (35,503 d)
- Aphelion: 3.8806 AU
- Perihelion: 2.3963 AU
- Semi-major axis: 3.1384 AU
- Eccentricity: 0.2365
- Orbital period (sidereal): 5.56 yr (2,031 d)
- Mean anomaly: 210.24°
- Mean motion: 0° 10^{m} 38.28^{s} / day
- Inclination: 8.9126°
- Longitude of ascending node: 322.66°
- Argument of perihelion: 16.158°

Physical characteristics
- Mean diameter: 43.67±1.0 km; 51.96±0.77 km; 52.651±0.357 km
- Mass: (3.75±0.75)×10^{17} kg (Note: Calculated from its standard gravitational parameter GM = 0.025±0.005 km^{3}/s^{2}.)
- Mean density: 4.89 g/cm^{3} (Note: Assuming a diameter of 52.7 km.)
- Synodic rotation period: 10.0813±0.0003 h (Note: Behrend (2011) web: Lightcurve plot of (987) Wallia, rotation period 0.420056 days (10.0813 h) hours with a brightness amplitude of 0.18±0.02 mag. LCDB quality code is 3. Summary figures and more information at Giovanni Casalnuovo's home page (C62), the LCDB and Behrend.)
- Geometric albedo: 0.126±0.005; 0.144±0.020; 0.1765±0.009
- Spectral type: D (S3OS2-TH); T (S3OS2-BB)
- Absolute magnitude (H): 9.5

987 Wallia (provisional designation: A922 UB or 1922 MR) is a large background asteroid from the outer regions of the asteroid belt, approximately 52 kilometers (32 miles) in diameter. It was discovered on 23 October 1922, by astronomer Karl Reinmuth at the Heidelberg Observatory in southern Germany. The D/T-type asteroid has a rotation period of 10.1 hours and shows an unusual trinomial lightcurve. It was named after a common German female name, unrelated to the discoverer's contemporaries, and taken from the almanac Lahrer Hinkender Bote.

== Orbit and classification ==
Wallia is a non-family asteroid of the main belt's background population when applying the hierarchical clustering method to its proper orbital elements. It orbits the Sun in the outer asteroid belt at a distance of 2.4–3.9 AU once every 5 years and 7 months (2,031 days; semi-major axis of 3.14 AU). Its orbit has an eccentricity of 0.24 and an inclination of 9° with respect to the ecliptic.

On 8 August 1899, Wallia was first observed as A899 PJ (1899 PJ) at the Boyden Station of the Harvard Observatory in Arequipa, Peru (the observatory has since moved to South Africa). The body's observation arc begins at the Vienna Observatory on 22 December 1922, about two months after to its official discovery observation at Heidelberg.

== Naming ==
This minor planet was named "Wallia", after a female name picked from the Lahrer Hinkender Bote, published in Lahr, southern Germany. A Hinkender Bote (lit. "limping messenger") was a very popular almanac, especially in the alemannic-speaking region from the late 17th throughout the early 20th century. The calendar section contains feast days, the dates of important fairs and astronomical ephemerides. For 13 October, the calendar gives "Wallia" as the German analogue for Koloman (Saint Colman) and Eduard, the respective catholic and Protestant feast-days. Latter is likely related to Saint Edward the Confessor (1004–1066), whose feast day is also 13 October.

=== Reinmuth's calendar names ===
As with 913 Otila, 994 Otthild, 997 Priska and 1144 Oda, Reinmuth selected names from this calendar due to his many asteroid discoveries that he had trouble thinking of proper names. These names are not related to the discoverer's contemporaries. The author of the Dictionary of Minor Planet Names learned about Reinmuth's source of inspiration from private communications with Dutch astronomer Ingrid van Houten-Groeneveld, who worked as a young astronomer at Heidelberg.

== Physical characteristics ==
In the Tholen- and SMASS-like taxonomy of the Small Solar System Objects Spectroscopic Survey (S3OS2), Wallia is a T-type and D-type asteroid, respectively. The rather dark D-types asteroids are common in the outer main belt and among the Jupiter trojan population.

=== Rotation period ===
In October 2011, a rotational lightcurve of Wallia was obtained from photometric observations by Italian amateur astronomers Giovanni Casalnuovo and Benedetto Chinaglia at the Eurac Observatory (C62) in southern Tyrol. (They also began observing at the Filzi School Observatory (D12) located south of Bolzano). Lightcurve analysis gave a well-defined rotation period of 10.0813±0.0003 hours with a brightness amplitude of 0.18±0.02 magnitude (U=3). Contrary to the common bimodal shape, the lightcurve for Wallia shows three minima and three maxima. The observers speculate that the unusual shape of the lightcurve might be due either to the body's particular morphology or to the presence of a small companion (the asteroid's possible binary status has not been mentioned since).

The results supersede previous observations by Jacques Montier, as well as by Andrea Ferrero (2011), René Roy (2008), L.A. Cieza and L.N. Ciliberti (1999), and Claes-Ingvar Lagerkvist (1979) with period determinations between 10 and 10.5 hours.

=== Diameter and albedo ===
According to the surveys carried out by the Japanese Akari satellite and the NEOWISE mission of NASA's Wide-field Infrared Survey Explorer, Wallia measures between 51.96±0.77 and 52.651±0.357 kilometers in diameter and its surface has an albedo between 0.126±0.005 and 0.144±0.020. The Infrared Astronomical Satellite IRAS gives a higher albedo of 0.1765±0.009 and consequently a smaller diameter of 43.67±1.0 kilometers, while the Collaborative Asteroid Lightcurve Link assumes an albedo of 0.1485 and derives a diameter of 43.41 km based on an absolute magnitude of 9.5. In 2004 and 2012, Wallia was also subject to two asteroid occultations, timed observations when the asteroid passes in front of a distant star. However the measurements were of poor quality in both cases and gave a best-fit ellipse dimension of (44.0 km × 44.0 km) and (52.0 km × 52.0 km), respectively.
