= Chinese intellectualism =

History of intellectualism in China

The current status of Chinese intellectuals reflects traditions established in the imperial period. For most of this period, government officials were selected from among the literati on the basis of the Confucian civil service examination system. Intellectuals were both participants in and critics of the government. As Confucian scholars, they were torn between their loyalty to the emperor and their obligation to "correct wrong thinking" when they perceived it.

Then, as now, most intellectual and government leaders subscribed to the premise that ideological change was a prerequisite for political change. Historically, Chinese intellectuals rarely formed groups to oppose the established government. Rather, individual intellectuals or groups of intellectuals allied themselves with cliques within the government to lend support to the policies of that clique.

== Background ==
With the abolition of the civil service examination system in 1905 and the end of the last imperial dynasty in 1911, intellectuals no longer had a vehicle for direct participation in the government. Although the absence of a strong national government would have been expected to provide a favorable situation for maximum intellectual independence, other inhibiting factors – such as the concentration of intellectuals in foreign controlled treaty ports, isolated from the mainstream of Chinese society, or in universities dependent on government financing – remained. Probably the greatest obstacle to the development of an intellectual community free of outside control was the rising tide of nationalism coupled with the fear of being accused of selling out to foreign interests.

In 1927 the newly established Nationalist government in Nanjing attempted to establish an intellectual orthodoxy based on the ideas of Sun Yat-sen, but intellectuals continued to operate with a certain degree of freedom in universities and treaty ports. Following the Japanese invasion and occupation of large parts of China in 1937, the Nationalist government tightened control over every aspect of life, causing a large number of dissident intellectuals to seek refuge in Communist-administered areas or in Hong Kong.

When the People's Republic of China was established in 1949, intellectuals came under strict government control. Educated overseas Chinese were invited to return home, and those intellectuals who remained in China were urged to contribute their technical expertise to rebuilding the country. Intellectuals were expected to serve the party and the state. Independent thinking was stifled, and political dissent was not tolerated.

In mid-1956 the Chinese Communist Party felt secure enough to launch the Hundred Flowers Campaign soliciting criticism under the classical "double hundred" slogan "Let a hundred flowers bloom, let the hundred schools of thought contend." "Let a hundred flowers bloom" applied to the development of the arts, and "let the hundred schools of thought contend" encouraged the development of science. The initiation of this campaign was followed by the publication in early 1957 of Mao Zedong's essay "On the Correct Handling of Contradictions among the People," in which he drew a distinction between "constructive criticisms among the people" and "hateful and destructive criticism between the enemy and ourselves."

In August 1957, when it was clear to the leadership that widespread criticism of the party and party cadres had gotten out of hand, the Anti-Rightist Campaign was launched to suppress all divergent thought and firmly reestablish orthodox ideology. Writers who had answered the party's invitation to offer criticisms and alternative solutions to China's problems were abruptly silenced, and many were sent to reform camps or internal exile. By the early 1960s, however, a few intellectuals within the party were bold enough to again propose policy alternatives, within stringent limits.

=== Cultural Revolution ===
When the Cultural Revolution began in 1966, party functionaries assumed positions of leadership at most research institutes and universities, and many schools were closed or converted to "soldiers', workers', and peasants' universities." Intellectuals, denounced as the "stinking ninth category," either were purged or had their work heavily edited for political "purity", which severely hampered most serious research and scholarship.

Following the fall of Lin Biao, Minister of National Defense and Mao's heir apparent, in 1971, the atmosphere for intellectuals began to improve. Under the aegis of Zhou Enlai and later Deng Xiaoping, many intellectuals were restored to their former positions and warily resumed their pre-Cultural Revolution duties. In January 1975 Zhou Enlai set out his ambitious Four Modernizations program and solicited the support of China's intellectuals in turning China into a modern industrialized nation by the end of the century.

== Post-Mao Zedong development ==
The Third Plenum of the Eleventh National Party Congress Central Committee in December 1978 officially made the Four Modernizations basic national policy and reemphasized the importance of intellectuals in achieving them. The policy of "seeking truth from facts" was stressed, and scholars and researchers were given freer rein to pursue scientific research. Most mainstream intellectuals were content to avoid political involvement and to take on the role of scholar- specialists within their spheres of competence, with the understanding that as long as they observed the Four Cardinal Principles they would be permitted to conduct their research with minimal bureaucratic interference. This was accomplished more easily in the natural sciences, which are generally recognized as apolitical, than in the social sciences, humanities, and the arts.

The first serious challenge to the more tolerant policy toward intellectuals came in 1980, as conservative ideologues in the military and the party stepped up their calls to combat "bourgeois liberalization," a loosely defined appellation for any writing or activity believed to stretch the limits of the 'four cardinal principles'. By early 1981 opposition to "bourgeois liberalization" was focused on Bai Hua, a writer with the Political Department of what was then the Wuhan Military Region. Bai had long been a strong advocate for relaxation of cultural and social policy, but what especially alarmed the guardians of cultural orthodoxy was his screenplay "Bitter Love," which depicted the frustrated patriotism of an old painter who faces misunderstanding and ill-treatment when he returns to China from the United States. When the screenplay first appeared in a nationally circulated literary magazine in the fall of 1979, it caused little stir. The motion picture version however, which was shown to selected officials, drew strong censure.

A commentary in the April 18, 1981, issue of Jiefangjun Bao (Liberation Army Daily) accused Bai Hua of violating the four cardinal principles and described the screenplay as an example of "bourgeois liberalism." The commentary was reprinted in the next month's issue of Jiefangjun Wenyi (Liberation Army Literature and Art), along with other articles critical of "Bitter Love." Over the next few months the criticism was taken up by most civilian newspapers, and acting minister of culture, Zhou Weizhi, singled out "Bitter Love" for attack in a speech delivered to the Twentieth Session of the Fifth National People's Congress Standing Committee in September.

Finally, Bai Hua yielded to the ostracism and wrote a letter of self-criticism addressed to Jiefangjun Bao and Wenyibao (Literary Gazette), in which he apologized for a "lack of balance" in "Bitter Love" and for failing to recognize the power of the party and the people to overcome obstacles in Chinese society. Bai Hua was out of public view for the next year but remained active, writing four short stories in the period. In January 1983, he was invited by the Ministry of Culture to participate in a Shanghai conference on film scripts, and in May of that year the Beijing People's Art Theater presented his new historical play, "The King of Wu's Golden Spear and the King of Yue's Sword," thought by many to be a veiled criticism of Mao Zedong and perhaps even of Deng Xiaoping.

Although the "Bitter Love" controversy caused considerable anxiety in the intellectual community, it is as noteworthy for what it did not do as for what it did. Unlike previous campaigns in which writers and all of their works were condemned, criticism in this case focused on one work, "Bitter Love." Neither Bai Hua's other works nor his political difficulties in the 1950s and 1960s were part of the discussion. In fact, as if to emphasize the limited nature of the campaign, at its height in May 1981, Bai was given a national prize for poetry by the Chinese Writers' Association.

=== Campaign against 'spiritual pollution' ===
After a mild respite in 1982 and most of 1983, opposition to "antibourgeois liberalism" returned in full force in the short-lived campaign against "spiritual pollution" launched by a speech given by Deng Xiaoping at the Second Plenum of the Twelfth National Party Congress Central Committee in October 1983. In the speech, Deng inveighed against advocates of abstract theories of human nature, "bourgeois humanitarianism," "bourgeois liberalism," and socialist alienation, as well as the growing fascination in China with "decadent elements" from Western culture. Conservatives, led by Political Bureau member Hu Qiaomu and party Propaganda Department head Deng Liqun, used the campaign in an effort to oppose those aspects of society that they disliked. The campaign soon was out of control and extended to areas beyond the scope that Deng Xiaoping had intended, raising fears at home and abroad of another Cultural Revolution.

Because of the campaign against spiritual pollution, intellectuals (including scientists and managerial and technical personnel) and party and government cadres were hesitant to take any action that could expose them to criticism. Peasants, whose production had greatly increased under the responsibility system adopted in 1981, felt uncertain about the future course of central policy. Because of this, many of them returned their specialized certificates and contracts to local authorities, sold their equipment, and lowered production targets. Many ordinary citizens, especially the young, resented the sudden interference in their private lives. Foreign businessmen and government leaders expressed serious reservations about the investment climate and China's policy of opening to the world.

Because of these adverse results, the central leadership reevaluated the campaign and limited it to theoretical, literary, and artistic circles and did not permit it to extend to science and technology, the economy, or rural areas. All ideological, theoretical, literary, and artistic issues were to be settled through discussion, criticism, and self-criticism, without resorting to labeling or attacks. By January 1984 the campaign against spiritual pollution had died out, and attention was once more turned to reducing leftist influence in government and society.

Following the campaign's failure, and perhaps because of it, the position and security of intellectuals improved significantly. In 1984 the party and government turned their attention to promoting urban economic reforms. A more positive approach to academic and cultural pursuits was reflected in periodic exhortations in the official press calling on the people to support and encourage the building of "socialist spiritual civilization," a term used to denote general intellectual activity, including ethics and morality, science, and culture.

Writers and other intellectuals were heartened by a speech delivered by Hu Qili, secretary of the party Secretariat, to the Fourth National Writers' Congress (December 29, 1984, to January 5, 1985). In the speech, Hu decried the political excesses that produced derogatory labels and decrees about what writers should and should not write and called literary freedom "a vital part of socialist literature." But as writers began to test the limits of the free expression called for by Hu Qili, they were reminded of their "social responsibilities," a thinly veiled warning for them to use self-censorship and to remain within the limits of free expression.

=== "Ten Changes in Contemporary Chinese Economic Research" ===
These limits, still poorly defined, were tested once again when Song Longxian, a young researcher at Nanjing University, using the pseudonym Ma Ding, published an article entitled "Ten Changes in Contemporary Chinese Economic Research" in the November 2, 1985, issue of the trade union paper Gongren Ribao (Workers' Daily). The article urged a pragmatic approach to economic theory and sharply attacked much previous economic research. A somewhat toned-downed version was republished in a subsequent issue of Beijing Review, a weekly magazine for foreign readers, and immediately became the center of a controversy continuing well into 1986. Ma Ding's supporters, however, far outnumbered his critics and included some important government officials.

In May 1986 the editor of Gongren Ribao, writing in another economic journal, summed up the controversy. He termed the criticism of the article of far greater significance than the article itself and commended the "related departments" for handling the "Ma Ding incident very prudently" and "relatively satisfactorily," but he expressed the hope that "more people in our country, particularly leaders," would join in "providing powerful protection to the theoretical workers who are brave enough to explore."

In 1986 there were numerous calls for a new Hundred Flowers Campaign, and there were indications that these calls were being orchestrated from the top. At a May 1986 conference to commemorate the thirtieth anniversary of the original Hundred Flowers Campaign, Zhu Houze, new head of the party's Propaganda Department, sounded the keynote when he said, "Only through the comparison and contention of different viewpoints and ideas can people gradually arrive at a truthful understanding...." Qin Jianxian, editor of Shijie Jingji Daobao (World Economic Journal), carried this theme further when he called for "unprecedented shocks to political, economic, and social life as well as to people's ideas, spiritual state, lifestyle, and thinking methods."

In a July 1986 interview with Beijing Review, Wang Meng, the newly appointed minister of culture, held out great expectations for a new Hundred Flowers Campaign that he said "could arouse the enthusiasm of writers and artists and give them the leeway to display their individual artistic character." During the summer of 1986, expectations were raised for a resolution to come out of the Sixth Plenum of the Twelfth National Party Congress Central Committee in September, a resolution that General Secretary Hu Yaobang promised would have a "profound influence on the development of spiritual civilization." The actual document, however, was a watered-down compromise that fell far short of expectations. It became clear that intellectual policy was not a matter to be easily resolved in the short-term but required lengthy debate.

=== Cultural Conservatism ===
==== The Chinese Straussians ====
Almost the entirety of Leo Strauss's writings has been translated into Chinese; and there even is a school of Straussians in China, the most prominent being Liu Xiaofeng (Renmin University) and Gan Yang. "Chinese Straussians" (who often are also fascinated by Carl Schmitt) represent a remarkable example of the hybridization of Western political theory in a non-Western context. As the editors of a recent volume write, "the reception of Schmitt and Strauss in the Chinese-speaking world (and especially in the People's Republic of China) not only says much about how Schmitt and Strauss can be read today, but also provides important clues about the deeper contradictions of Western modernity and the dilemmas of non-liberal societies in our increasingly contentious world."

==== The Chinese Schmittians ====
Some have argued that Schmitt has become an important influence on Chinese political theory in the 21st century, particularly since Xi Jinping became General Secretary of the Chinese Communist Party in 2012. Leading Chinese Schmittians include the theologian Liu Xiaofeng, the public policy scholar Wang Shaoguang, and the legal theorist and government adviser Jiang Shigong. Schmitt's ideas have proved popular and useful instruments in justifying the legitimacy of Chinese Communist Party rule.

The first important wave of Schmitt's reception in China started with Liu's writings at the end of the 1990s. In the context of a transition period, Schmitt was used both by liberal, nationalist and conservative intellectuals to find answers to contemporary issues. In the 21st century, most of them are still concerned with state power and to what extent a strong state is required to tackle China's modernization. Some authors consider Schmitt's works as a weapon against liberalism. Others think that his theories are helpful for China's development.

A critical reception of his use in a Chinese context does also exist. These differences go together with different interpretations of Schmitt's relation with fascism. While some scholars regard him as a faithful follower of fascism, others, such as Liu Xiaofeng, consider his support to the Nazi regime only as instrumental and attempt to separate his works from their historical context. According to them, his real goal is to pave a different and unique way for the modernization of Germany—precisely what makes him interesting for China. Generally speaking, the Chinese reception is ambivalent: quite diverse and dynamic, but also highly ideological. Other scholars are cautious when it comes to Schmitt's arguments for state power, considering the danger of totalitarianism, they assume at the same time that state power is necessary for the current transition and that a "dogmatic faith" in liberalism is unsuitable for China. By emphasizing the danger of social chaos, many of them agree with Schmitt—beyond their differences—on the necessity of a strong state.

== See also ==
- Chinese historiography
- Chinese philosophy
