= Tongji Medical College =

Medical school in Wuhan, Hubei, China

Coordinates: 30.5990°N 114.3011°E

Tongji Medical College, Huazhong University of Science and Technology
- 华中科技大学同济医学院
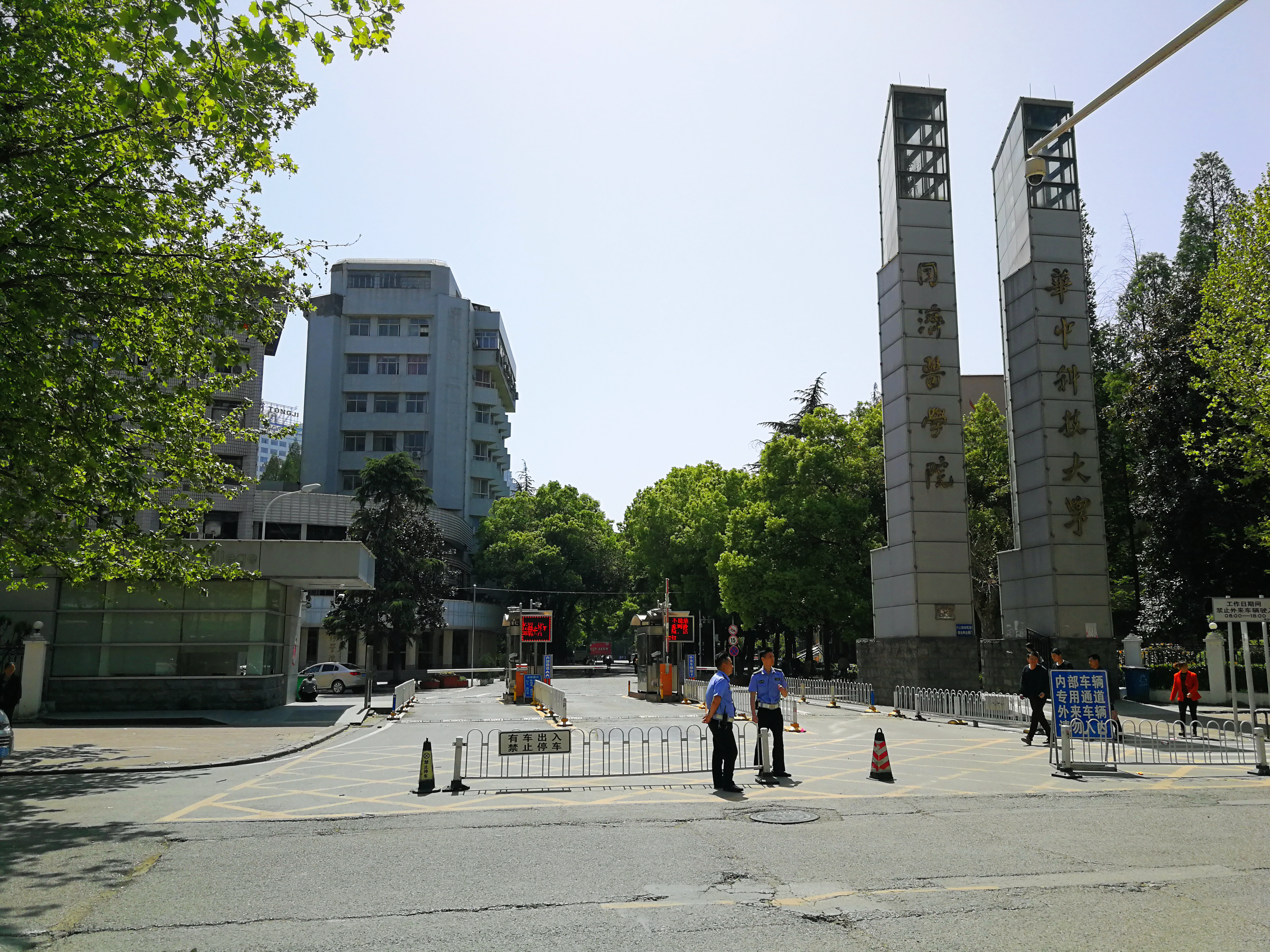
- the Main Gate
- Type: Medical school
- Established: May 20, 1907; 119 years ago
- Parent institution: Huazhong University of Science and Technology
- Affiliations: Union Hospital; Tongji Hospital
- President: Chen Jianguo
- Dean: Chen Jianguo
- Faculty: 3,000
- Students: 10,000
- Location: Wuhan, Hubei, China

Tongji Medical College (TJMC, simplified Chinese: 同济医学院; traditional Chinese: 同濟醫學院; pinyin: Tóngjì Yīxúeyuàn) is the medical school of Huazhong University of Science and Technology, located in Wuhan, China. Formerly Tongji Medical University, it became part of the newly established HUST in 2000. More than 10 graduates of the medical school have been awarded memberships to the Chinese Academy of Sciences and Chinese Academy of Engineering.

The Tongji Medical College is a medical school in China. It has one member of the Chinese Academy of Sciences (Chen Xiaoping) and one member of the Chinese Academy of Engineering (Ma Ding), and one member of the US National Academy of Medicine (Frank B. Hu), more than 1,400 full and associate professors, over 1,800 lecturers, and over 7,500 staff. Doctorate degrees can be conferred in 31 subjects and specialties, with 116 tutors for doctoral candidates, and there are 51 subjects and specialties for which master's degrees can be granted with over 540 tutors for graduate students. Post-doctoral mobile stations have been set up in basic medicine, public health, preventive medicine and clinical medicine.

== Historical evolution ==
=== Summary of history ===
Tongji Medical College was founded by Dr. Erich Paulun in 1907 as German Medical School in Shanghai. In 1927, it became the medical school of National Tongji University.

After the founding of the People's Republic of China, in 1951 the medical school was moved from Shanghai to Wuhan, where it merged with the medical college of Wuhan University to form Central-South Tongji Medical College. Tongji Hospital, founded in Shanghai in 1900 by Erich Paulun, a German physician, and Wuhan Union Hospital (formerly Hankow Mission and Hankou Union Hospital) founded in 1866 by Griffith John, a British man, were attached to Tongji College as its university hospitals. In 1955, the name of the college was changed to Wuhan Medical College; and in 1985, it was renamed Tongji Medical University. On May 26, 2000, it became the Tongji Medical College of Huazhong University of Science and Technology.

=== Shanghai German Medical school ===
- On October 1, 1907, the medical school held an opening ceremony. The school site was set up in the Tongji University hospital opposite White Gram Road (now Shanghai Fengyang Road).

=== Tongji German Medicine School ===
- In 1908 "Shanghai German Medical School" changed its name to "Tongji German Medical School".

=== Tongji Medical and Engineering School ===
- In 1912, additional engineering courses were started, and the name was changed to Tongji Medical and Engineering School. Medicine, Engineering and the German were taught in the school.
- In 1922, the school moved to Wusong Town (吴淞镇)

=== National Tongji University Medical School ===
- On May 20, 1924, the name was changed to Tongji Medical and Engineering University, due to comprehensive expansion of the school.
- In August 1927, National Tongji University was established, and the original medicine, engineering branches were separately changed to medicine school and engineering school.
- In 1937, several additional colleges and schools were built, including colleges of Literature and sciences, and a law school. The university became a comprehensive university, and was renowned for its prestigious reputation in medicine and engineering.
- In August 1937, Wusong Town and Shanghai city were engaged in a decisive battle of Far East field during World War II. Shortly after the battle, the medical school moved to East side of Shanghai city, then across provinces of Zhejiang, Jiangxi, Guangxi and Yunnan, and finally arrived in Yibin(宜宾) and Nanxi of Sichuan province in October 1940.
- In July 1946, Tongji University Medical School moved back Shanghai with ending of the World War II.

=== Central-south Tongji Medical College ===
- In February 1950, the Shanghai Tongji University Medical School and its attached Tongji Hospital moved to the hinterland of Wuhan. The Medical School, along with Wuhan University medical School, formed the newly established Central-south Tongji Medical College.

=== Wuhan Medical College ===
- In August 1955, the Medical School changed name to Wuhan Medical College during rearrangement of Chinese Higher Education system.

=== Tongji Medical University ===
- In July 1985, the Medical School changed name to Tongji Medical University after significant expansion of the school. Dr. Wu Zaide (吴在德) was appointed president, and Dr. Qiu Fazu 裘法祖 as honorary president.

=== Tongji Medical College of HUST ===
- On June 15, 2000, the university became part of the new Huazhong University of Science and Technology. The name was changed to Tongji Medical College of Huazhong University of Science and Technology.

== The discipline and state key laboratory ==
=== State key disciplines ===
- Internal medicine (Cardiology)
- Internal medicine (Pulmonary/Critical Care)
- Surgery (General)
- Gynecology & Obstetrics
- Occupational Health and Environment Health
- Forensic Medicine (Pathology and Clinical)
- Anesthesiology and Pain Medicine

=== Province department level key discipline ===
- Human body anatomy and organization embryology
- Pharmacology
- Medicine phantom study
- Pathology and pathophysiology
- Otolaryngology
- Internal medicine, hematology
- Immunology
- Medical imaging and Nuclear Medicine
- Clinical pharmacy
- Forensic Pathology and Clinical Forensic Medicine

=== State key laboratory ===
==== Ministry of Education key laboratory ====
- Key laboratory of Organ Transplanting, Prof. Chen Xiao-Ping
- Key laboratory of Environment and Health, Prof. Zhou Yi-Kai

==== Ministry of health key laboratory ====
- Key laboratory of Organ Transplanting, Prof. Chen Xiao-ping
- Key laboratory of Respiratory System Disease, Prof. Xu Yong-Jian

==== Environmental protection bureau key laboratory ====
- Key laboratory of Environmental Protection and Health, Prof. Zhou Yi-Kai

==== Hubei Province key laboratory ====
- Key laboratory of Tumor Invasion and Metastasis, Prof. Ma Ding
- Key laboratory of Nervous System Significant Disease, Prof. Wang Jian-Zhi
- Key laboratory of Target to Biology Treatment, Prof. Huang Shi-Ang
- Key laboratory of Food Nutrition and Safety, Prof. Liu Liegang

== Presidents ==
- 1907 - 1909 Erich Paulun
- 1909 - 1917 Fu Shabo
- ? - 1940 Bai De
- 1941 Huang Rong-Zeng zh:黄榕增
- May 1941 - January 1942 Liang Zhi-Yan zh:梁之彦
- February 1942 - September 1942 Ding Wen-Yuan zh:丁文渊
- 1942 - 1944 Ruang Shang-Cheng zh:阮尚丞
- 1944 - August 1945 Xu Yong-Ming zh:徐诵明
- 1945 - 1951 Du Gong-Zhen zh:杜公振
- 1951 - 1968 Tang Zhe zh:唐哲
- 1968 - 1972 Yin Chuang-Zhao zh:尹传昭
- 1972 - 1974 Xiong Yun-Fa zh:熊运发
- 1974 - 1981 Zhang Di-Sheng zh:张涤生
- 1981 - 1984 Qiu Fazu
- 1984 - 1992 Wu Zai-De zh:吴在德
- 1992 - 1997 Xue De-Lin zh:薛德麟
- 1997 - 2000 Hong Guang-Xiang zh:洪光祥
- 2000 - 2005 Xiang Ji-Zhou zh:向继洲
- 2005 - 2006 Tian Yu-Ke zh:田玉科
- 2006 - 2012 Feng You-Mei zh:冯友梅
- 2013 - 2015 Ma Jian-Hui zh:马建辉
- 2015–present Chen Jian-Guo zh:陈建国

== Structure ==
=== Clinical institutes and centers ===
- School of Basic Medicine
- School of Public health
- School of Pharmacy
- School of Medicine & Health Management
- Department of Forensic Medicine
- School of Nursing
- Family Planning Research Institute
- First clinical college (Wuhan Union Hospital)
- Second clinical college (Wuhan Tongji Hospital)
- Third clinical college (Wuhan Liyuan Hospital)
- Fourth clinical college (Wuhan No. 1 Hospital | Wuhan Hospital of Traditional Chinese and Western Medicine)
- Fifth clinical college (Wuhan Central Hospital)
- Sixth clinical college (Wuhan Children's Hospital)
- Seventh clinical college (Hubei Cancer Hospital)
- Eighth clinical college (Wuhan Pu'Ai Hospital | Wuhan No. 4 Hospital)
- Ninth clinical college (Wuhan Mental Health Center)
- Tenth clinical college (Hubei Maternity And Child Health Hospital)
- Eleventh clinical college (Wuhan Jinyintan Hospital)

Note: All of the above external links direct to Chinese websites.

=== Research institute, center and graduate school ===
- Birth control research institute
- Cardiovascular disease research institute
- Cooperation of Chinese and Western medicine research institute
- Environmental medicine research institute
- Foundation medicine research institute
- Gerontology research institute
- Hematology research institute
- Higher medicine education research institute
- Immunology research institute
- Liver disease research institute
- Medicine humanities study research institute
- Medicine informatics research institute
- Neuroscience research institute
- Occupational disease research institute
- Organ transplantation research institute
- Otolaryngology research institute
- Pulmonary disease research institute
- Social medicine research institute
- Urology research institute

=== Affiliated hospitals ===
- First clinical college (Wuhan Union Hospital)
- Second clinical college (Wuhan Tongji Hospital)
- Third clinical college (Wuhan Liyuan Hospital)
- Fourth clinical college (Wuhan No. 1 Hospital | Wuhan Hospital of Traditional Chinese and Western Medicine)
- Fifth clinical college (Wuhan Central Hospital)
- Sixth clinical college (Wuhan Children's Hospital)
- Seventh clinical college (Hubei Cancer Hospital)
- Eighth clinical college (Wuhan Pu'Ai Hospital | Wuhan No. 4 Hospital)
- Ninth clinical college (Wuhan Mental Health Center)
- Tenth clinical college (Hubei Maternity And Child Health Hospital)
- Eleventh clinical college (Wuhan Jinyintan Hospital)

Note: All of the above external links direct to Chinese websites.

=== Student and teacher ===
Teachers approximately 2000 people, professors approximately 350 people, associate professors approximately 600 people. Current students approximately 10000 in the school. Graduates approximately 60000.

== Notable alumni ==
=== Graduates ===
- Liang Boqiang 梁伯强 1916 -1923 Medicine educationalist, and pathologist, member of Chinese Academy of Sciences, pioneer pathologist in China
- Jin Wen-Qi 金问淇 1919 -1920 Pre-medical course, State level one professor, Gynecology and obstetrics expert
- Bei Shi-Zhang 贝时璋 1919 -1921 Experimental biologist, cell biologist, educationalist. Member of Chinese Academy of Sciences, founder of both Embryology and cytology in China, and founder of biophysics in China
- Li Fu-Jing 李赋京 1920 State level one professor, the famous pathologist
- Shen Qi-Zheng 沈其震 1923 entering medical school, medical physiologist, member of Chinese Academy of Sciences
- Lu Fu-Hua 吕富华 1925 -1932 Pharmacologist, and medical educationalist
- Tao Huan-Le 陶桓乐 1935 graduate, State level one professor, pulmonologist
- Xie Ming-Jin 谢敏晋 1932 -1936 microbiologist
- Qiu Fa-Zu 裘法祖 1932 -1936 pre-medical course, member of Chinese Academy of Sciences
- Wu Zhong-Bi 武忠弼 1936 Teaches at Tongji until now, pathologist
- Qian Zhong-Xin 钱信忠 Former Chinese Minister of Health
- Wu Meng-Chao 吴孟超 1949 graduate, member of Chinese Academy of Sciences
- Wu Sheng 吴旻 1950 graduate, member of Chinese Academy of Sciences
- Lu Dao-Pei 陆道培 1955 graduate, member of Chinese Academy of Engineering
- Hou Yun-De 侯云德 1955 graduate, member of Chinese Academy of Engineering
- Gui Xi-En 桂希恩 1960 graduate, infectious disease expert, Belly-Martin medal winner
- Zhou Hong-Hao 周宏灏 1962 graduate, member of Chinese Academy of Engineering
- Yin Da-Kui 殷大奎 1964 graduate, former vice Chinese Minister of Health
- He Jie-Sheng 何界生 1969 graduate, former vice Chinese Minister of Health, CEO of Chinese life insurance company
- Tongzhang Zheng 郑同章 1980 Graduate, Professor at School of Public Health Brown University
- Yang Bao-Feng 杨宝峰 1988 graduate, PhD in pharmacology, member of Chinese Academy of Engineering, President of Harbin Medical University
- Frank Hu 胡丙长 1988 graduate, Professor at Harvard T.H. Chan School of Public Health, Member of US National Academy of Medicine
- Shen Kang 沈康 1994 graduate, HHMI Investigator, Professor at Stanford University
- Guo-Li Ming 明国莉 1994 graduate, Perelman Professor of Neuroscience at University of Pennsylvania, member of US National Academy of Medicine

=== Faculty Members ===
- Wang Bao-Wen 王宝韫 1939 -1958 Taught at Tongji, State level one professor
- Tong Di-Zhou 童第周 1941 -1943 Taught at Tongji, experimental biologist, educationalist, and member of Chinese Academy of Sciences. Founder of China experimental Embryology. In 1963, he performed nuclear transfer (therapeutic cloning) by transferring DNA of Male Koi into eggs of koi, which resulted in replication of the male Koi with similar phenotype.
- Li Bao-Shi 李宝实 1947 -1955 year Taught at Tongji, State level one professor, otolaryngologist.
- Yu Guang-Yuan 于光元 1948- taught at Tongji, State level one professor
- Zhang Di-Sheng 张涤生 1949 -1955 taught at Tongji, State level one professor, orthopedic surgery expert
- Cai Dao-Hong 蔡宏道 1949- taught at Tongji, famous clinical pathologist, environment hygienist, medical educationalist
- Wang Zhi-Ping 王智平 Taught at Philosophy Department of Tongji Medical University. He initiated the medical student humanities education.

== See also ==
- Huazhong University of Science and Technology
- Tongji University
- Wuhan University
