= Capital Normal University =

Public university in Beijing, China

Coordinates: 39.9294°N 116.3003°E

- 首都师范大学
- Former names: Beijing Normal College
- Motto: 为学为师、求实求新
- Type: Public
- Established: 1954; 72 years ago
- Affiliations: BHUA
- President: Fang Fuquan
- Party Secretary: Meng Fanhua
- Academic staff: 1,675 (Oct 2021)
- Total staff: 2,946 (Oct 2021)
- Students: 27,672 (Oct 2021)
- Undergraduates: 11,901 (Oct 2021)
- Postgraduates: 8,202 (Oct 2021)
- Other students: 1,098 (Foreign students); 5,921 (Adult education student) (Oct 2021)
- Location: Haidian, Beijing, China
- Campus: Urban, 88 ha (217.5 acres)
- Website: www.cnu.edu.cn

Chinese name
- Simplified Chinese: 首都师范大学
- Traditional Chinese: 首都師範大學
Transcriptions
Standard Mandarin
- Hanyu Pinyin: Shǒudū Shīfàn Dàxué

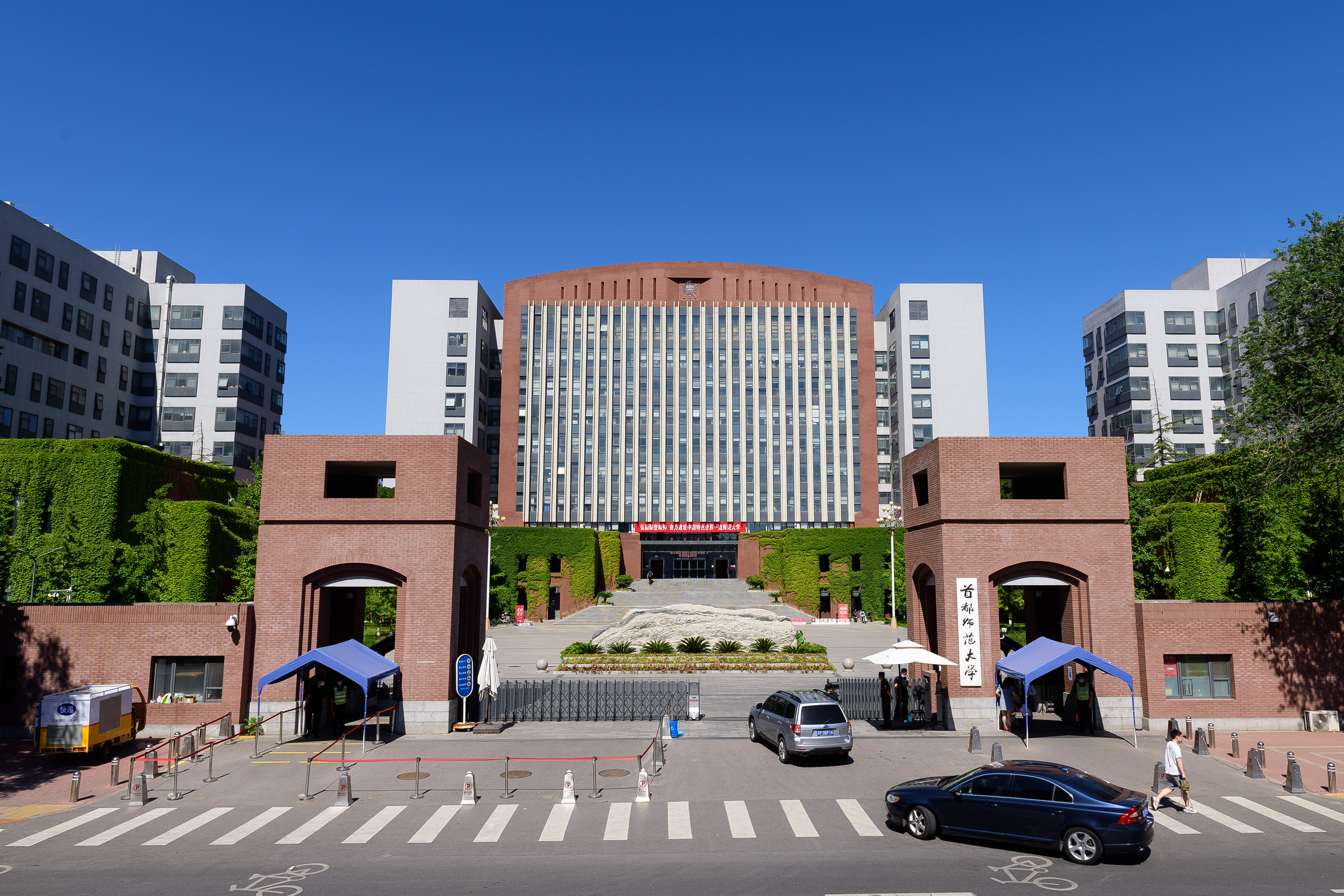
Main campus

Capital Normal University (CNU; 首都师范大学) is a municipal public university in Beijing, China. It is affiliated with the City of Beijing and co-funded by the Beijing Municipal People's Government and the Ministry of Education. The university is part of the Double First-Class Construction.

The "Normal" in the university's name means it is an institution created to train teachers by educating them in the norms of pedagogy and curriculum.

The school was founded in 1954, formerly known as Beijing Normal College (北京师范学院), and its history of teaching could be traced back to Tongzhou Teachers School (通州师范学校), which was established in 1905. After 1960, some departments of North China Renmin University (华北人民大学), Beijing Workers and Peasants Normal College (北京工农师范学院), Beijing Art Normal College (北京艺术师范学院), and Beijing Normal Vocational School (北京师范专科学校) were successively merged into the school. In 1992, the Branch Campus of Beijing Normal University was merged into the school, which was then renamed Capital Normal University in the same year. After that, Beijing Union University Foreign Languages Normal School, Beijing Third Normal School, Tongzhou Normal School, and Beijing Preschool Normal School were successively merged into the university.

== Campus ==
Capital Normal University comprises eight campuses most of which are located on Third Ring Road in Beijing. The southern campus is the headquarters and houses the majority of CNU's academic programs. The North 1 campus houses the College of International Culture. The North 2 campus houses the College of Information Engineering. The East 1 campus houses the College of Education. The LiangXiang campus houses the Department of Fundamental Education for freshman.

== Notable alumni ==
- Bai Jingting, a Chinese actor and singer
- Pu Shu, a famous ballad singer
- Wang Hairong, grand-niece of Mao Zedong
- Xiaoyuan Liu, academic and author
- Yuan Tengfei, a famous history teacher
