= Frank Hu =

Nutrition researcher

Frank B. Hu
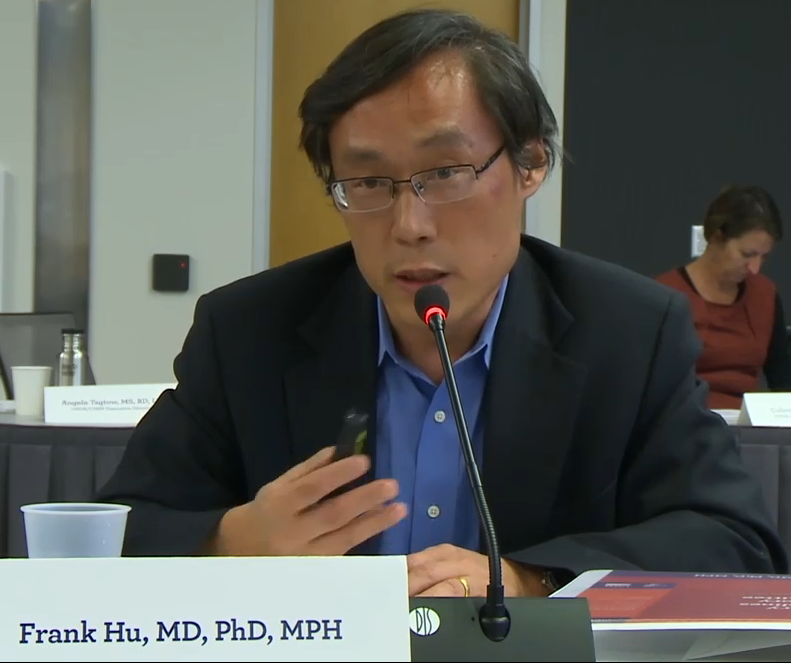
- Born: 1966 (age 59–60); Honghu, Hubei Province, China
- Education: University of Illinois Chicago; Huazhong University of Science and Technology
- Scientific career
- Fields: Nutrition
- Workplaces: Harvard Medical School

Frank B. Hu (Chinese: 胡丙长; pinyin: Hú Bǐngcháng; born 1966) is a Chinese American nutrition and diabetes researcher. He is Chair of the Department of Nutrition and the Fredrick J. Stare Professor of Nutrition and Epidemiology at the Harvard T.H. Chan School of Public Health, and Professor of Medicine at the Harvard Medical School.

Hu is also the Director of the Epidemiology and Genetics Core of the Boston Obesity Nutrition Research Center; and co-director of the Program in Obesity Epidemiology and Prevention at the Harvard T.H. Chan School of Public Health.

Hu was elected into the National Academy of Medicine (NAM) in 2015, one of the highest honors in the fields of health and medicine.

== Education ==
A native of Hubei Province, China, Hu received his M.D. from the Tongji Medical University (now Tongji Medical College of the Huazhong University of Science and Technology) in Wuhan in 1988, and his Ph.D. from the University of Illinois at Chicago in 1996.

== Research ==
Hu's research has focused on diet/lifestyle, metabolic, and genetic determinants of obesity, type 2 diabetes, and cardiovascular disease (CVD). His group has conducted detailed analyses of many dietary and lifestyle factors and risk of diabetes and CVD, including sugar-sweetened beverages, coffee, red meat, saturated and polyunsaturated fatty acids, iron, and dietary patterns. These findings have contributed to current public health recommendations and policies for prevention of chronic diseases. Dr. Hu's group has also identified novel biomarkers (e.g., adipokines and nutrient metabolites) and gene-environment interactions in relation to risk of obesity and diabetes by integrating cutting-edge omics technologies into epidemiological studies (Systems Epidemiology approach). In addition, Dr. Hu has been collaborating with researchers from China to study nutrition transition, metabolic phenotypes, and cardiovascular disease in Chinese populations. His researches have also extended to global nutrition, obesity and policy issues.

In 1997, he published a study showing that types of fat are more important than total amount of fat in determining risk of heart disease in the Nurses' Health Study. His recent work shows that unsaturated fats, especially polyunsaturated fats, and/or high-quality carbohydrates can be used to replace saturated fats to reduce coronary heart disease risk in the Nurses' Health Study and Health Professionals Follow-up Study.

In 2001, Hu published a study to quantify the preventability of type 2 diabetes through diet and lifestyle, showing that up to 90% of diabetes cases can be prevented by eating a healthy diet, maintaining normal weight, exercising regularly, not smoking tobacco, and consuming alcohol moderately.

Hu has conducted extensive research on sugar-sweetened beverages and the risk of obesity, type 2 diabetes, and cardiovascular disease.

Dr. Hu is a recipient of the Kelly West Award for Outstanding Achievement in Epidemiology from the American Diabetes Association in 2010. He served on the IOM Committee on Preventing the Global Epidemic of Cardiovascular Disease: Meeting the Challenges in Developing Countries (2009-2010), and the AHA/ACC Obesity Guidelines Expert Panel (2008-2013). Dr. Hu also served on the 2015 Dietary Guidelines Advisory Committee, USDA/HHS. He is the principal author of a textbook on Obesity Epidemiology (Oxford University Press, 2008).
