= Zou Xuexiao =

- 邹学校

President of Hunan Agricultural University
- Incumbent
- Assumed office December 2018
- Preceded by: Fu Shaohui

Personal details
- Born: 24 July 1963 (age 63) Hengyang County, Hunan, China
- Party: Chinese Communist Party
- Education: Hunan Agricultural University; Nanjing Agricultural University
- Scientific career
- Fields: Vegetables
- Workplaces: Hunan Agricultural University

Chinese name
- Simplified Chinese: 邹学校
- Traditional Chinese: 鄒學校
Transcriptions
Standard Mandarin
- Hanyu Pinyin: Zōu Xuéxiào

Zou Xuexiao (born 24 July 1963) is a Chinese botanist and an academician of the Chinese Academy of Engineering, currently serving as president of Hunan Agricultural University.

== Biography ==
Zou was born in Tongzi Township, Hengyang County, Hunan, on 24 July 1963. He has four siblings. He secondary studied at Hengyang County No. 6 High School. In 1979, he enrolled at Hunan Agricultural University where he received his bachelor's degree in vegetables in 1983 and his master's degree in genetic breeding in 1986. He received his doctor's degree in agronomy from Nanjing Agricultural University in 2005.

In July 1986, he worked as an official at the Hunan Academy of Agricultural Sciences, becoming director of Vegetable Research Institute in 1996, vice president in 2000, and president in 2005. He joined the Chinese Communist Party in September 1994. In December 2018, he was appointed president of Hunan Agricultural University, replacing Fu Shaohui.

== Personal life ==
Zou is married and has a daughter.

== Honours and awards ==
- 1995 State Science and Technology Progress Award (Second Class)
- 1999 National Labor Medal
- 2000 State Science and Technology Progress Award (Second Class)
- 2003 State Science and Technology Progress Award (Second Class)
- 2016 State Science and Technology Progress Award (Second Class)
- 2017 Science and Technology Progress Award of the Ho Leung Ho Lee Foundation
- 27 November 2017 Member of the Chinese Academy of Engineering (CAE)

Educational offices
Preceded by Fu Shaohui	President of Hunan Agricultural University; 2018–present	Incumbent
