= Wang Hairong =

Chinese politician

- 王海容

Personal details
- Born: 25 September 1938 Changsha, Hunan, China
- Died: 9 September 2017 (aged 78) Beijing, China
- Education: Beijing Normal Institute; Beijing Foreign Languages Institute

Wang Hairong (Chinese: 王海容; 25 September 1938 – 9 September 2017) was a Chinese politician who served as vice minister in the Chinese Ministry of Foreign Affairs between July 1974 and February 1979.

== Education and career ==
She graduated from the Russian Department of Beijing Normal Institute in 1964 and then entered Beijing Foreign Languages Institute to study English. She joined the Ministry of Foreign Affairs in November 1965. From July 1971 to May 1972, she served as Deputy Director General of the Protocol Department and participated in the reception of Henry Kissinger in his secret visit to China and in the reception of Richard Nixon in his subsequent visit to China. From May 1972 to July 1974, she was Assistant Foreign Minister in charge of protocol. After April 1984, she served as Deputy Chief of the Counselor's Office of the State Council. She died on 9 September 2017, aged 78. Wang was unmarried and childless. That date was also the 41st anniversary of her great-uncle Mao Zedong's death.
