= Qiu Fazu =

Chinese surgeon and politician

- 裘法祖
- Born: Qiu Fazu; 6 December 1914; Hangzhou, Zhejiang, Republic of China
- Died: 14 June 2008 (aged 93); Wuhan, Hubei, China
- Education: Hangchow University Preparatory School; Tongji University
- Known for: the father of modern Chinese surgery.
- Spouse: Loni König (m. 1945)
- Children: 3

Qiu Fazu (Chinese: 裘法祖; pinyin: Qiú Fǎzǔ; December 6, 1914; Hangzhou, Zhejiang – June 14, 2008; Wuhan, Hubei) was a Chinese surgeon and politician. He was a saviour of Jewish prisoners. In the People's Republic of China, he is considered the father of modern Chinese surgery.

== Life ==
Qiu's mother died of appendicitis and inadequate medical assistance at a young age in 1933, which motivated Qiu to study medicine. Qiu studied at Hangchow University Preparatory School (current Zhejiang University) in Hangzhou and graduated in 1932. He initially graduated from the German School of Medicine in Shanghai, the predecessor of today's Tongji University. In 1936, he won a Humboldt scholarship and went to study at the Ludwig-Maximilians-Universität München (LMU). He graduated from the LMU in November 1939 with honours and received his PhD and the license to practise his profession in Germany.

In September 1944, at the age of 31, Qiu was advanced to the rank of attending physician and headed the Jodquellenhof in Bad Tölz, which had been turned into a makeshift hospital. On 30 April and 1 May 1945, thousands of concentration camp prisoners passed through Bad Tölz on their death march from the Dachau concentration camp. One day, a student nurse called Loni König, from Munich, led him to a group of about 40 prisoners, guarded by the SS on the street in front of the hospital. Qiu later recalled the incident: "they were wrecks, sick and weak, they could walk no further and were huddling on the ground." He gathered all his courage and told the soldiers that "These prisoners have typhoid. We must take them." He hid the concentration camp prisoners until the end of the war in the basement of the hospital and treated them. His German colleagues, as well as Loni, the student nurse, helped him. In 1945, after the war ended, Qiu and Loni married.

In 1946, Qiu returned to Shanghai with his German wife. She adopted the name Qiu Luoyi and in 1958 attained Chinese citizenship. There, Qiu worked as the head of the surgical department at the Sino-US Hospital that was attached to Tongji University. During Mao Zedong's Cultural Revolution (1966–1976), he was made to clean toilets, amongst other things. During this time, he found great support in his wife.

In 1978, after the Cultural Revolution, Qiu was made Vice-President of Tongji Medical University in Wuhan, which by then had completely moved out of Tongji University in Shanghai to Wuhan and has been now a department of the local Huazhong University of Science and Technology. He was also made the head of the organ transplant research institute there. In 1981, he became the Head of the University and in 1984, he was made the Honorary Head, the post of which he remained at until his death in 2008.

Qiu was one of the most acclaimed surgeons of China and a pioneer of Chinese organ transplantation, who wrote a standard textbook of surgery that is still in use and has been reprinted many times. He was a member of the Chinese Academy of Sciences and, from 1975 to 1993, was a member of the Chinese Communist Party, the deputy to the 4th-7th National People's Congresses.

Qiu died aged 94 and was buried on 7 April 2009 at Qiu Fazu Square in Tongji Medical College, Huazhong University of Science and Technology in Wuhan.

== Awards (selection) ==
- 1982: Honorary doctorate from the Faculty of Clinical Medicine I of the University of Heidelberg, with whom Qiu had arranged a partnership agreement in 1985 between the Medical School of Wuhan and the Medical Faculty of Heidelberg for the exchange of scientists and students.
- 1985: Grand Federal Cross of Merit of the Federal Republic of Germany.
- 2007: Honorary member of the German Society for Visceral Surgery for the rescue of Jewish prisoners.
