= Erich Paulun =

Erich Paulun

Erich Paulun (simplified Chinese: 宝隆; traditional Chinese: 寶隆; pinyin: Bǎo Lóng) (born 4 March 1862 in Pasewalk; died 5 March 1909 in Shanghai) was a German naval surgeon. After leaving active duty in 1899, he founded together with the German medical doctor Oscar von Schab the Tung Chee Hospital for Chinese (Tung-Chee in Pinyin: Tongji). He founded the Shanghai German medicine school in 1907, the German government established the "German Medical School for Chinese in Shanghai". Paulun was the founding rector. Today, Tongji Medical College of Huazhong University of Science and Technology in Wuhan and the Tongji University in Shanghai rely on this foundation.
