= 994 Otthild =

Main-belt asteroid

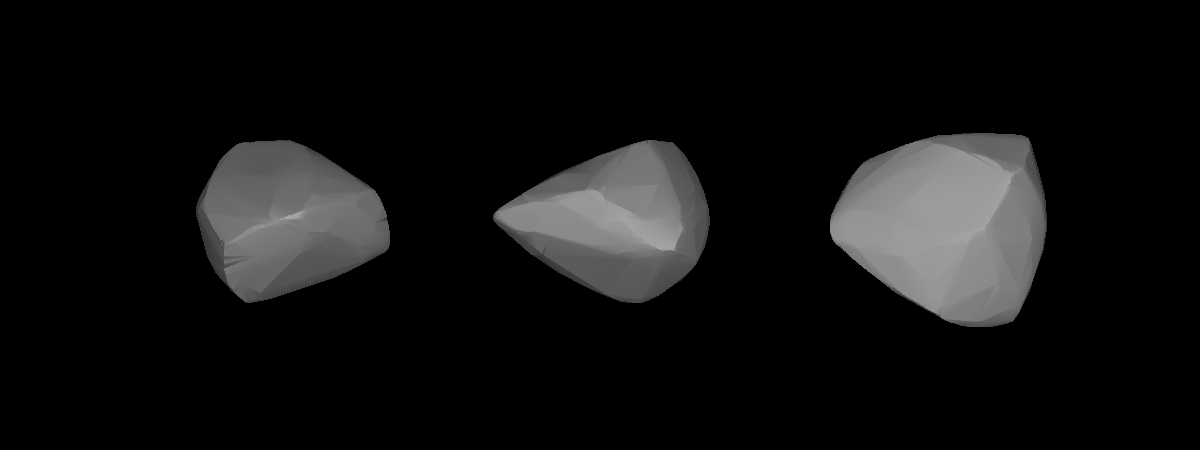
- Lightcurve-based 3D-model of Otthild

Discovery
- Discovered by: K. Reinmuth
- Discovery site: Heidelberg Obs.
- Discovery date: 18 March 1923

Designations
- Named after: Name picked from the almanac Lahrer Hinkender Bote
- Alternative designations: A923 FB · 1923 NL; 1960 KC · 1967 CM; 1967 EK_{1} · 1923 NL
- Minor planet category: main-belt · (middle) background

Orbital characteristics
- Epoch 27 April 2019 (JD 2458600.5)
- Uncertainty parameter 0
- Observation arc: 96.15 yr (35,119 d)
- Aphelion: 2.8235 AU
- Perihelion: 2.2349 AU
- Semi-major axis: 2.5292 AU
- Eccentricity: 0.1164
- Orbital period (sidereal): 4.02 yr (1,469 d)
- Mean anomaly: 156.20°
- Mean motion: 0° 14^{m} 42^{s} / day
- Inclination: 15.411°
- Longitude of ascending node: 2.3500°
- Argument of perihelion: 342.50°

Physical characteristics
- Mean diameter: 20.786±1.371 km; 24.34±0.61 km; 24.42±1.6 km
- Synodic rotation period: 5.9473±0.0001 h (Note: Lightcurve plot (994) Otthild produced by Reiner Stoss and Laurent Bernasconi. The obtained rotation period was 0.247804 days (5.9473 hours). Summary figures at Raoul Behrend – Geneva Observatory.)
- Pole ecliptic latitude: (183.0°, −50.0°) (λ_{1}/β_{1}); (41.0°, −39.0°) (λ_{2}/β_{2})
- Geometric albedo: 0.2247±0.032; 0.227±0.013; 0.310±0.036
- Spectral type: SMASS = S; B–V = 0.860±0.020; U–B = 0.420±0.030
- Absolute magnitude (H): 10.2

994 Otthild (prov. designation: A923 FB or 1923 NL) is a stony background asteroid from the central regions of the asteroid belt, approximately 24 kilometers (15 miles) in diameter. It was discovered on 18 March 1923, by astronomer Karl Reinmuth at the Heidelberg-Königstuhl State Observatory. The S-type asteroid has a rotation period of 5.95 hours and is rather regular in shape. It was named after a common German female name, unrelated to the discoverer's contemporaries, and taken from the almanac Lahrer Hinkender Bote.

== Orbit and classification ==
Otthild is a non-family asteroid of the main belt's background population when applying the hierarchical clustering method to its proper orbital elements. It orbits the Sun in the central asteroid belt at a distance of 2.2–2.8 AU once every 4 years (1,469 days; semi-major axis of 2.53 AU). Its orbit has an eccentricity of 0.12 and an inclination of 15° with respect to the ecliptic. The body's observation arc begins on 20 March 1931 at Heidelberg just two days after its official discovery observation.

== Naming ==
This minor planet was named Otthild, after a female name picked from the Lahrer Hinkender Bote, published in Lahr, southern Germany. A Hinkender Bote (lit. "limping messenger") was a very popular almanac, especially in the alemannic-speaking region from the late 17th throughout the early 20th century. The calendar section contains feast days, the dates of important fairs and astronomical ephemerides. For the second of July, the calendar gives "Otto" and "Otthild" as the German analogue for the catholic and protestant feast-days (Mary's Visitation and Otto).

=== Reinmuth's calendar names ===
As with 913 Otila, 997 Priska and 1144 Oda, Reinmuth selected names from this calendar due to his many asteroid discoveries that he had trouble thinking of proper names. These names are not related to the discoverer's contemporaries. The author of the Dictionary of Minor Planet Names learned about Reinmuth's source of inspiration from private communications with Dutch astronomer Ingrid van Houten-Groeneveld, who worked as a young astronomer at Heidelberg.

== Physical characteristics ==
In the Bus–Binzel SMASS classification, Otthild is a common, stony S-type asteroid.

=== Rotation period ===
In October 2005, a rotational lightcurve of Otthild was obtained from photometric observations by European observers Reiner Stoss, Jaume Nomen, Salvador Sánchez , Raoul Behrend and Laurent Bernasconi. Lightcurve analysis gave a rotation period of 5.9473±0.0001 hours with a relatively low brightness amplitude of 0.15±0.01 magnitude (U=2+), which is indicative of a regular shape.

=== Poles ===
A modeled lightcurve gave a concurring sidereal period of 5.94819 hours using data from the Uppsala Asteroid Photometric Catalogue, the Palomar Transient Factory survey, and individual observers (such as above), as well as sparse-in-time photometry from the NOFS, the Catalina Sky Survey, and the La Palma surveys (950). The study also determined two spin axes of (183.0°, −50.0°) and (41.0°, −39.0°) in ecliptic coordinates (λ, β).

=== Diameter and albedo ===
According to the survey carried out by the NEOWISE mission of NASA's Wide-field Infrared Survey Explorer, Otthild measures (20.786±1.371) kilometers in diameter and its surface has an albedo of (0.310±0.036). The Japanese Akari satellite and the Infrared Astronomical Satellite IRAS determined a somewhat larger diameter of (24.34±0.61) and (24.42±1.6) kilometers with an albedo of (0.227±0.013) and (0.2247±0.032), respectively. The Collaborative Asteroid Lightcurve Link derives an albedo of 0.2136 and a diameter of 24.36 kilometers based on an absolute magnitude of 10.36.
