= Intellectualism =

Mental perspective

Intellectualism is the mental perspective that emphasizes the use, development, and exercise of the intellect, and is identified with the life of the mind of the intellectual. In the field of philosophy, the term intellectualism indicates one of two ways of critically thinking about the character of the world: (i) rationalism, which is knowledge derived solely from reason; and (ii) empiricism, which is knowledge derived solely from sense experience. Each intellectual approach attempts to eliminate fallacies that ignore, mistake, or distort evidence about "what ought to be" instead of "what is" the character of the world.

== Ancient moral intellectualism ==
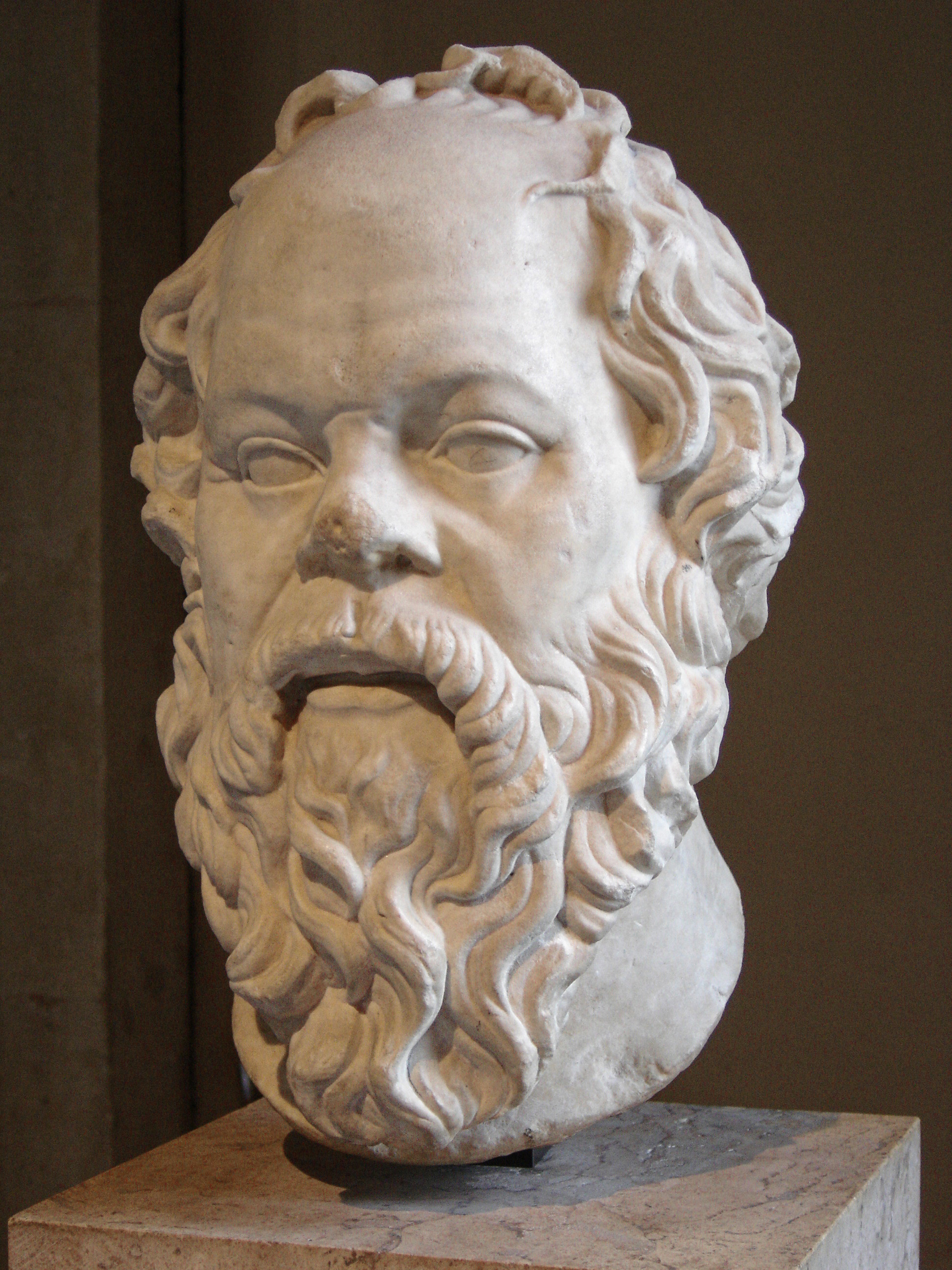
Socrates (c. 470 – 399 BC)

The first historical figure who is usually called an "intellectualist" was the Greek philosopher Socrates (c. 470 – 399 BC), who taught that intellectualism allows that "one will do what is right or [what is] best, just as soon as one truly understands what is right or best"; that virtue is a matter of the intellect, because virtue and knowledge are related qualities that a person accrues, possesses, and improves by dedication to the use of reason. Philosopher Dominic Scott refers to a "standard criticism" of Socrates' attitude to human nature: that he treats human nature as more rational than it really is.

Socrates's definition of moral intellectualism is a basis of the philosophy of Stoicism, wherein the consequences of that definition are called "Socratic paradoxes", such as "There is no weakness of will", because a person either knowingly does evil or knowingly seeks to do evil (moral wrong); that anyone who does commit evil or seeks to commit evil does so involuntarily; and that virtue is knowledge, that there are few virtues, but that all virtues are one.

The concepts of truth and knowledge in contemporary philosophy are unlike Socrates's concepts of truth, knowledge, and ethical conduct, and cannot be equated with modern, post–Cartesian conceptions of knowledge and rational intellectualism. In that vein, by way of detailed study of history, Michel Foucault demonstrated that in classical antiquity (800 BC – AD 1000), "knowing the truth" was akin to "spiritual knowledge", which is integral to the principle of "caring for the self". In an effort to become a moral person the care for the self is realised through ascetic exercises meant to ensure that knowledge of truth was learned and integrated to the Self. Therefore, to understand truth meant possessing "intellectual knowledge" that integrated the self to the (universal) truth and to living an authentic life. Achieving that ethical state required continual care for the self, but also meant being someone who embodies truth, and so can readily practice the Classical-era rhetorical device of parrhesia: "to speak candidly, and to ask forgiveness for so speaking"; and, by extension, to practice the moral obligation to speak truth for the common good, even at personal risk.

== Medieval theological intellectualism ==
Medieval theological intellectualism is a doctrine of divine action, wherein the faculty of intellect precedes, and is superior to, the faculty of the will (voluntas intellectum sequitur). As such, intellectualism is contrasted with voluntarism, which proposes the will as superior to the intellect, and to the emotions; hence, the stance that "according to intellectualism, choices of the Will result from that which the intellect recognizes as good; the will, itself, is determined. For voluntarism, by contrast, it is the Will which identifies which objects are good, and the Will, itself, is indetermined". From that philosophical perspective and historical context, the Spanish Muslim polymath Averroës (1126–1198) in the 12th century, the English theologian Roger Bacon, the Italian Christian theologian Thomas Aquinas (1225–1274), and the German Christian theologian Meister Eckhart (1260–1327) in the 13th century, are recognised intellectualists.

== See also ==
- Anti-intellectualism
- Chinese intellectualism
- Intellectual
- Intellectual movements in Iran
- Intelligentsia
- Intelligence Quotient
- Scientia potentia est
