= Liang Boqiang =

Chinese pathologist and member of Chinese Academy of Sciences (1899-1968)

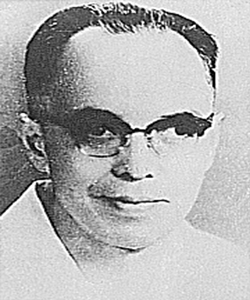
- Born: February 1, 1889
- Died: November 28, 1968 (aged 79)

Liang Boqiang (Chinese: 梁伯强; 1 February 1899 – 28 November 1968, Jiaying, Guangdong, China) Chinese pathologist, member of Chinese Academy of Sciences, pioneer pathologist in China. Among his other accomplishments, he held the first endowed directorship of the Institute of Cancer Research of Sun Yat-Sen University.
