= Ma Ding =

Chinese obstetrician and gynecologist

- 马丁
- Born: 24 April 1957 (age 69); Kunming, Yunnan, China
- Education: Tongji Medical College of HUST
- Scientific career
- Fields: Gynaecology and obstetrics
- Workplaces: Tongji Medical College of HUST

Chinese name
- Simplified Chinese: 马丁
- Traditional Chinese: 馬丁
Transcriptions
Standard Mandarin
- Hanyu Pinyin: Mǎ Dīng

Ma Ding (born 24 April 1957) is a Chinese obstetrician and gynecologist who is director of Department of Obstetrics and Gynecology, Tongji Medical College of HUST, and an academician of the Chinese Academy of Engineering.

== Biography ==
Ma was born into a medical family in Kunming, Yunnan, on 24 April 1957. He has five siblings. He earned a Bachelor's degree in 1982, a Master's in 1986, and a PhD in 1990, all from Tongji Medical College of HUST. He carried out postdoctoral research at the University of Texas in March 1992 and was an assistant professor at the university from January 1995 to November 1997.

Ma returned to China in November 1997 and became director of the Department of Obstetrics and Gynecology, Tongji Medical College of HUST.

== Honours and awards ==
- 2010 State Science and Technology Progress Award (Second Class)
- 2011 State Science and Technology Progress Award (Second Class)
- 2012 State Science and Technology Progress Award (Second Class)
- 2015 Science and Technology Progress Award of the Ho Leung Ho Lee Foundation
- 27 November 2017 Member of the Chinese Academy of Engineering (CAE)
