= List of minor planets: 611001–612000 =

The following is a partial list of minor planets, running from minor-planet number 611001 through 612000, inclusive. The primary data for this and other partial lists is based on JPL's "Small-Body Orbital Elements" and data available from the Minor Planet Center. Critical list information is also provided by the MPC, unless otherwise specified from Lowell Observatory. A detailed description of the table's columns and additional sources are given on the main page including a complete list of every page in this series, and a statistical break-up on the dynamical classification of minor planets.

Also see the summary list of all named bodies in numerical and alphabetical order, and the corresponding naming citations for the number range of this particular list. New namings may only be added to this list after official publication, as the preannouncement of names is condemned by the Working Group for Small Bodies Nomenclature of the International Astronomical Union.

Near-Earth obj.	MBA (inner)	MBA (outer)	Centaur
Mars-crosser	MBA (middle)	Jupiter trojan	Trans-Neptunian obj.
Unclassified

== 611001–611100 ==
Designation			Discovery			Properties		Ref
Permanent	Provisional	Named after	Date	Site	Discoverer(s)	Category	Diam.	Ref
611001	2006 QN_{38}	—	August 18, 2006	Anderson Mesa	LONEOS	·	2.5 km	MPC · JPL
611002	2006 QX_{40}	—	August 17, 2006	Palomar	NEAT	·	960 m	MPC · JPL
611003	2006 QJ_{41}	—	August 17, 2006	Palomar	NEAT	GEF	1.1 km	MPC · JPL
611004	2006 QA_{43}	—	July 22, 2006	Mount Lemmon	Mount Lemmon Survey	·	1.3 km	MPC · JPL
611005	2006 QM_{49}	—	August 22, 2006	Palomar	NEAT	·	750 m	MPC · JPL
611006	2006 QQ_{49}	—	August 24, 2006	Socorro	LINEAR	ERI	1.5 km	MPC · JPL
611007	2006 QN_{54}	—	August 17, 2006	Palomar	NEAT	MAS	580 m	MPC · JPL
611008	2006 QL_{55}	—	August 20, 2006	Palomar	NEAT	NYS	730 m	MPC · JPL
611009	2006 QN_{57}	—	August 27, 2006	Schiaparelli	L. Buzzi	NYS	960 m	MPC · JPL
611010	2006 QX_{57}	—	July 18, 2006	Siding Spring	SSS	·	2.2 km	MPC · JPL
611011	2006 QK_{59}	—	May 26, 2006	Mount Lemmon	Mount Lemmon Survey	·	890 m	MPC · JPL
611012	2006 QR_{66}	—	August 21, 2006	Kitt Peak	Spacewatch	(18466)	2.5 km	MPC · JPL
611013	2006 QU_{70}	—	August 21, 2006	Kitt Peak	Spacewatch	·	1.6 km	MPC · JPL
611014	2006 QJ_{71}	—	August 21, 2006	Kitt Peak	Spacewatch	MAS	660 m	MPC · JPL
611015	2006 QZ_{71}	—	August 21, 2006	Kitt Peak	Spacewatch	V	580 m	MPC · JPL
611016	2006 QX_{75}	—	August 21, 2006	Kitt Peak	Spacewatch	·	1.5 km	MPC · JPL
611017	2006 QE_{78}	—	August 22, 2006	Palomar	NEAT	·	970 m	MPC · JPL
611018	2006 QM_{85}	—	August 27, 2006	Kitt Peak	Spacewatch	·	1.4 km	MPC · JPL
611019	2006 QW_{85}	—	August 27, 2006	Kitt Peak	Spacewatch	AST	1.5 km	MPC · JPL
611020	2006 QK_{94}	—	August 19, 2006	Kitt Peak	Spacewatch	GAL	1.3 km	MPC · JPL
611021	2006 QO_{94}	—	August 17, 2006	Palomar	NEAT	·	940 m	MPC · JPL
611022	2006 QT_{94}	—	August 21, 2006	Kitt Peak	Spacewatch	MAS	630 m	MPC · JPL
611023	2006 QX_{94}	—	August 20, 2006	Palomar	NEAT	V	700 m	MPC · JPL
611024	2006 QK_{95}	—	August 17, 2006	Palomar	NEAT	·	2.1 km	MPC · JPL
611025	2006 QC_{97}	—	August 19, 2006	Anderson Mesa	LONEOS	·	2.3 km	MPC · JPL
611026	2006 QJ_{98}	—	August 22, 2006	Palomar	NEAT	·	980 m	MPC · JPL
611027	2006 QX_{98}	—	August 22, 2006	Palomar	NEAT	NYS	1.1 km	MPC · JPL
611028	2006 QT_{99}	—	August 21, 2006	Palomar	NEAT	·	1.1 km	MPC · JPL
611029	2006 QF_{110}	—	August 28, 2006	Kitt Peak	Spacewatch	·	850 m	MPC · JPL
611030	2006 QD_{123}	—	August 29, 2006	Catalina	CSS	DOR	2.0 km	MPC · JPL
611031	2006 QB_{126}	—	August 28, 2006	Siding Spring	SSS	·	1.4 km	MPC · JPL
611032	2006 QO_{130}	—	November 3, 2007	Mount Lemmon	Mount Lemmon Survey	·	1.1 km	MPC · JPL
611033	2006 QR_{132}	—	June 21, 2006	Catalina	CSS	TIR	4.1 km	MPC · JPL
611034	2006 QW_{133}	—	August 24, 2006	Socorro	LINEAR	·	1.1 km	MPC · JPL
611035	2006 QZ_{137}	—	August 16, 2006	Palomar	NEAT	·	690 m	MPC · JPL
611036	2006 QL_{145}	—	August 18, 2006	Kitt Peak	Spacewatch	·	1.6 km	MPC · JPL
611037	2006 QE_{151}	—	August 19, 2006	Kitt Peak	Spacewatch	·	1.6 km	MPC · JPL
611038	2006 QV_{159}	—	August 19, 2006	Kitt Peak	Spacewatch	·	2.3 km	MPC · JPL
611039	2006 QS_{160}	—	August 19, 2006	Kitt Peak	Spacewatch	·	810 m	MPC · JPL
611040	2006 QW_{167}	—	August 30, 2006	Anderson Mesa	LONEOS	·	1.8 km	MPC · JPL
611041	2006 QD_{178}	—	August 27, 2006	Kitt Peak	Spacewatch	·	1.4 km	MPC · JPL
611042	2006 QJ_{178}	—	August 27, 2006	Kitt Peak	Spacewatch	·	1.5 km	MPC · JPL
611043	2006 QJ_{180}	—	August 28, 2006	Kitt Peak	Spacewatch	HOF	2.3 km	MPC · JPL
611044	2006 QS_{185}	—	March 12, 2005	Kitt Peak	Spacewatch	·	2.4 km	MPC · JPL
611045	2006 QV_{188}	—	January 11, 2008	Kitt Peak	Spacewatch	·	1.1 km	MPC · JPL
611046	2006 QY_{188}	—	August 18, 2006	Kitt Peak	Spacewatch	·	900 m	MPC · JPL
611047	2006 QL_{189}	—	August 28, 2006	Catalina	CSS	·	950 m	MPC · JPL
611048	2006 QS_{189}	—	August 26, 2013	Haleakala	Pan-STARRS 1	·	850 m	MPC · JPL
611049	2006 QT_{189}	—	August 27, 2006	Kitt Peak	Spacewatch	L4	7.4 km	MPC · JPL
611050	2006 QC_{191}	—	June 20, 2013	Mount Lemmon	Mount Lemmon Survey	·	890 m	MPC · JPL
611051	2006 QF_{193}	—	August 19, 2006	Kitt Peak	Spacewatch	·	690 m	MPC · JPL
611052	2006 QJ_{193}	—	August 27, 2006	Kitt Peak	Spacewatch	NYS	780 m	MPC · JPL
611053	2006 QN_{196}	—	October 2, 2016	Mount Lemmon	Mount Lemmon Survey	·	1.5 km	MPC · JPL
611054	2006 QX_{198}	—	November 7, 2007	Kitt Peak	Spacewatch	·	1.4 km	MPC · JPL
611055	2006 QE_{199}	—	September 4, 2011	Haleakala	Pan-STARRS 1	·	1.6 km	MPC · JPL
611056	2006 QA_{203}	—	August 27, 2006	Kitt Peak	Spacewatch	·	1.9 km	MPC · JPL
611057	2006 QR_{203}	—	August 29, 2006	Lulin	LUSS	·	800 m	MPC · JPL
611058	2006 QC_{204}	—	August 18, 2006	Kitt Peak	Spacewatch	·	1.5 km	MPC · JPL
611059	2006 QK_{204}	—	August 28, 2006	Kitt Peak	Spacewatch	·	1.3 km	MPC · JPL
611060	2006 QO_{204}	—	August 21, 2006	Kitt Peak	Spacewatch	·	1.6 km	MPC · JPL
611061	2006 QN_{205}	—	August 27, 2006	Kitt Peak	Spacewatch	·	1.5 km	MPC · JPL
611062	2006 QR_{205}	—	August 29, 2006	Kitt Peak	Spacewatch	AGN	930 m	MPC · JPL
611063	2006 QX_{205}	—	August 19, 2006	Kitt Peak	Spacewatch	AEO	850 m	MPC · JPL
611064 Jeroenstil	2006 RF_{3}	Jeroenstil	September 14, 2006	Mauna Kea	D. D. Balam	·	2.6 km	MPC · JPL
611065	2006 RO_{8}	—	August 24, 2006	Palomar	NEAT	·	980 m	MPC · JPL
611066	2006 RG_{9}	—	August 22, 2006	Palomar	NEAT	·	1.2 km	MPC · JPL
611067	2006 RQ_{14}	—	September 14, 2006	Kitt Peak	Spacewatch	·	850 m	MPC · JPL
611068	2006 RB_{20}	—	August 18, 2006	Kitt Peak	Spacewatch	·	1 km	MPC · JPL
611069	2006 RF_{20}	—	August 28, 2006	Goodricke-Pigott	R. A. Tucker	·	2.7 km	MPC · JPL
611070 Hsurueron	2006 RG_{23}	Hsurueron	July 21, 2006	Lulin	H.-C. Lin, Q. Ye	·	1.1 km	MPC · JPL
611071	2006 RA_{25}	—	September 14, 2006	Kitt Peak	Spacewatch	·	2.5 km	MPC · JPL
611072	2006 RC_{30}	—	August 22, 2006	Palomar	NEAT	·	1.1 km	MPC · JPL
611073	2006 RB_{35}	—	August 28, 2006	Goodricke-Pigott	R. A. Tucker	EUN	1.7 km	MPC · JPL
611074	2006 RJ_{37}	—	August 22, 2006	Palomar	NEAT	·	2.6 km	MPC · JPL
611075	2006 RL_{44}	—	September 14, 2006	Kitt Peak	Spacewatch	·	1.8 km	MPC · JPL
611076	2006 RK_{45}	—	September 14, 2006	Kitt Peak	Spacewatch	·	860 m	MPC · JPL
611077	2006 RG_{46}	—	September 14, 2006	Kitt Peak	Spacewatch	·	1.5 km	MPC · JPL
611078	2006 RX_{48}	—	September 14, 2006	Kitt Peak	Spacewatch	KOR	1.1 km	MPC · JPL
611079	2006 RK_{67}	—	September 15, 2006	Kitt Peak	Spacewatch	WIT	940 m	MPC · JPL
611080	2006 RS_{79}	—	September 15, 2006	Kitt Peak	Spacewatch	·	1.5 km	MPC · JPL
611081	2006 RV_{82}	—	September 15, 2006	Kitt Peak	Spacewatch	·	1.6 km	MPC · JPL
611082	2006 RJ_{90}	—	September 15, 2006	Kitt Peak	Spacewatch	HOF	2.0 km	MPC · JPL
611083	2006 RZ_{93}	—	September 15, 2006	Kitt Peak	Spacewatch	·	940 m	MPC · JPL
611084	2006 RT_{98}	—	September 15, 2006	Kitt Peak	Spacewatch	AST	1.6 km	MPC · JPL
611085	2006 RK_{106}	—	September 26, 2006	Kitt Peak	Spacewatch	·	1.2 km	MPC · JPL
611086	2006 RK_{108}	—	September 25, 2006	Mount Lemmon	Mount Lemmon Survey	·	1.9 km	MPC · JPL
611087	2006 RF_{109}	—	September 14, 2006	Mauna Kea	Masiero, J., R. Jedicke	KOR	950 m	MPC · JPL
611088	2006 RX_{110}	—	September 14, 2006	Mauna Kea	Masiero, J., R. Jedicke	·	850 m	MPC · JPL
611089	2006 RC_{112}	—	September 14, 2006	Kitt Peak	Spacewatch	·	1.3 km	MPC · JPL
611090	2006 RG_{114}	—	September 14, 2006	Mauna Kea	Masiero, J., R. Jedicke	·	1.3 km	MPC · JPL
611091	2006 RS_{119}	—	September 25, 2006	Mount Lemmon	Mount Lemmon Survey	MAS	680 m	MPC · JPL
611092	2006 RU_{123}	—	September 15, 2006	Kitt Peak	Spacewatch	·	2.8 km	MPC · JPL
611093	2006 RZ_{124}	—	September 15, 2006	Kitt Peak	Spacewatch	·	1.5 km	MPC · JPL
611094	2006 RU_{125}	—	September 15, 2006	Kitt Peak	Spacewatch	AGN	940 m	MPC · JPL
611095	2006 RV_{125}	—	September 15, 2006	Kitt Peak	Spacewatch	·	1.5 km	MPC · JPL
611096	2006 SU_{10}	—	September 16, 2006	Kitt Peak	Spacewatch	·	1.9 km	MPC · JPL
611097	2006 SA_{14}	—	September 17, 2006	Kitt Peak	Spacewatch	·	900 m	MPC · JPL
611098	2006 SE_{29}	—	September 17, 2006	Kitt Peak	Spacewatch	·	860 m	MPC · JPL
611099	2006 SC_{30}	—	August 29, 2006	Catalina	CSS	V	600 m	MPC · JPL
611100	2006 ST_{31}	—	September 17, 2006	Kitt Peak	Spacewatch	·	590 m	MPC · JPL

== 611101–611200 ==
back to top

Designation			Discovery			Properties		Ref
Permanent	Provisional	Named after	Date	Site	Discoverer(s)	Category	Diam.	Ref
611101	2006 SF_{35}	—	September 17, 2006	Kitt Peak	Spacewatch	·	1.3 km	MPC · JPL
611102	2006 SO_{42}	—	September 14, 2006	Kitt Peak	Spacewatch	H	380 m	MPC · JPL
611103	2006 SD_{44}	—	August 29, 2006	Catalina	CSS	(2076)	890 m	MPC · JPL
611104	2006 SG_{45}	—	September 18, 2006	Kitt Peak	Spacewatch	·	2.2 km	MPC · JPL
611105	2006 SA_{52}	—	September 18, 2006	Socorro	LINEAR	(2076)	810 m	MPC · JPL
611106	2006 SR_{52}	—	September 19, 2006	Catalina	CSS	V	570 m	MPC · JPL
611107	2006 SZ_{58}	—	September 16, 2006	Catalina	CSS	·	2.7 km	MPC · JPL
611108	2006 SL_{63}	—	August 28, 2006	Kitt Peak	Spacewatch	·	1.7 km	MPC · JPL
611109	2006 SR_{65}	—	September 19, 2006	Kitt Peak	Spacewatch	·	1.7 km	MPC · JPL
611110	2006 SL_{67}	—	September 19, 2006	Kitt Peak	Spacewatch	KOR	1.2 km	MPC · JPL
611111	2006 SX_{76}	—	September 20, 2006	Kitt Peak	Spacewatch	DOR	2.2 km	MPC · JPL
611112	2006 ST_{80}	—	September 18, 2006	Kitt Peak	Spacewatch	·	2.1 km	MPC · JPL
611113	2006 SJ_{83}	—	September 18, 2006	Kitt Peak	Spacewatch	·	740 m	MPC · JPL
611114	2006 SE_{86}	—	September 18, 2006	Kitt Peak	Spacewatch	·	1.6 km	MPC · JPL
611115	2006 SL_{86}	—	September 14, 2006	Kitt Peak	Spacewatch	·	730 m	MPC · JPL
611116	2006 SH_{92}	—	September 18, 2006	Kitt Peak	Spacewatch	·	1.2 km	MPC · JPL
611117	2006 ST_{100}	—	September 19, 2006	Kitt Peak	Spacewatch	·	730 m	MPC · JPL
611118	2006 SL_{102}	—	September 19, 2006	Kitt Peak	Spacewatch	KOR	990 m	MPC · JPL
611119	2006 SH_{103}	—	September 19, 2006	Kitt Peak	Spacewatch	AST	1.4 km	MPC · JPL
611120	2006 SF_{104}	—	September 19, 2006	Kitt Peak	Spacewatch	·	1.8 km	MPC · JPL
611121	2006 SR_{104}	—	September 19, 2006	Kitt Peak	Spacewatch	·	1.7 km	MPC · JPL
611122	2006 SC_{107}	—	September 19, 2006	Kitt Peak	Spacewatch	·	1.6 km	MPC · JPL
611123	2006 SG_{107}	—	September 19, 2006	Kitt Peak	Spacewatch	·	800 m	MPC · JPL
611124	2006 SA_{110}	—	September 20, 2006	Kitt Peak	Spacewatch	·	1.4 km	MPC · JPL
611125	2006 SO_{114}	—	September 14, 2006	Kitt Peak	Spacewatch	MAS	600 m	MPC · JPL
611126	2006 SN_{115}	—	August 27, 2006	Kitt Peak	Spacewatch	·	1.7 km	MPC · JPL
611127	2006 SX_{131}	—	September 16, 2006	Catalina	CSS	·	1.2 km	MPC · JPL
611128	2006 ST_{135}	—	August 13, 2006	Palomar	NEAT	·	940 m	MPC · JPL
611129	2006 SY_{136}	—	September 20, 2006	Catalina	CSS	·	1.0 km	MPC · JPL
611130	2006 SP_{138}	—	September 20, 2006	Palomar	NEAT	·	1.0 km	MPC · JPL
611131	2006 SN_{140}	—	September 22, 2006	Catalina	CSS	·	2.4 km	MPC · JPL
611132	2006 SP_{143}	—	September 19, 2006	Kitt Peak	Spacewatch	KOR	1.0 km	MPC · JPL
611133	2006 SL_{147}	—	September 19, 2006	Kitt Peak	Spacewatch	·	770 m	MPC · JPL
611134	2006 SD_{153}	—	September 20, 2006	Kitt Peak	Spacewatch	AST	1.4 km	MPC · JPL
611135	2006 SE_{157}	—	October 30, 1999	Kitt Peak	Spacewatch	MAS	610 m	MPC · JPL
611136	2006 SV_{161}	—	July 21, 2006	Mount Lemmon	Mount Lemmon Survey	·	850 m	MPC · JPL
611137	2006 SF_{163}	—	September 24, 2006	Kitt Peak	Spacewatch	·	1.5 km	MPC · JPL
611138	2006 SC_{166}	—	September 25, 2006	Kitt Peak	Spacewatch	·	1.6 km	MPC · JPL
611139	2006 SO_{166}	—	April 7, 2005	Kitt Peak	Spacewatch	·	1.1 km	MPC · JPL
611140	2006 SL_{170}	—	September 17, 2006	Kitt Peak	Spacewatch	·	1.8 km	MPC · JPL
611141	2006 SM_{170}	—	September 17, 2006	Kitt Peak	Spacewatch	KOR	1.1 km	MPC · JPL
611142	2006 SN_{171}	—	September 17, 2006	Kitt Peak	Spacewatch	AGN	1.0 km	MPC · JPL
611143	2006 SA_{172}	—	September 25, 2006	Kitt Peak	Spacewatch	·	1.5 km	MPC · JPL
611144	2006 SG_{172}	—	September 25, 2006	Kitt Peak	Spacewatch	·	1.1 km	MPC · JPL
611145	2006 SW_{172}	—	September 25, 2006	Kitt Peak	Spacewatch	HOF	2.0 km	MPC · JPL
611146	2006 SV_{174}	—	September 25, 2006	Mount Lemmon	Mount Lemmon Survey	·	2.0 km	MPC · JPL
611147	2006 SM_{176}	—	September 25, 2006	Mount Lemmon	Mount Lemmon Survey	KOR	1.0 km	MPC · JPL
611148	2006 SX_{182}	—	September 25, 2006	Kitt Peak	Spacewatch	·	990 m	MPC · JPL
611149	2006 SP_{187}	—	August 23, 2006	Palomar	NEAT	·	960 m	MPC · JPL
611150	2006 SX_{190}	—	September 26, 2006	Mount Lemmon	Mount Lemmon Survey	·	1.0 km	MPC · JPL
611151	2006 SD_{195}	—	September 23, 2006	Kitt Peak	Spacewatch	KOR	1.2 km	MPC · JPL
611152	2006 SZ_{211}	—	September 26, 2006	Mount Lemmon	Mount Lemmon Survey	HOF	1.9 km	MPC · JPL
611153	2006 SL_{213}	—	March 26, 2004	Kitt Peak	Spacewatch	·	1.9 km	MPC · JPL
611154	2006 SB_{216}	—	September 27, 2006	Kitt Peak	Spacewatch	·	1.5 km	MPC · JPL
611155	2006 SF_{225}	—	September 26, 2006	Kitt Peak	Spacewatch	·	1.7 km	MPC · JPL
611156	2006 SR_{225}	—	September 26, 2006	Kitt Peak	Spacewatch	·	1.6 km	MPC · JPL
611157	2006 SS_{225}	—	February 14, 2004	Kitt Peak	Spacewatch	·	2.1 km	MPC · JPL
611158	2006 SC_{231}	—	September 26, 2006	Kitt Peak	Spacewatch	NAE	1.8 km	MPC · JPL
611159	2006 SO_{231}	—	August 19, 2001	Cerro Tololo	Deep Ecliptic Survey	MRX	910 m	MPC · JPL
611160	2006 SG_{232}	—	September 26, 2006	Kitt Peak	Spacewatch	·	1.2 km	MPC · JPL
611161	2006 SW_{234}	—	September 26, 2006	Kitt Peak	Spacewatch	·	1.7 km	MPC · JPL
611162	2006 SY_{237}	—	September 18, 2006	Kitt Peak	Spacewatch	·	910 m	MPC · JPL
611163	2006 SL_{248}	—	September 26, 2006	Mount Lemmon	Mount Lemmon Survey	·	790 m	MPC · JPL
611164	2006 SL_{251}	—	September 12, 2001	Kitt Peak	Spacewatch	KOR	1.2 km	MPC · JPL
611165	2006 SH_{252}	—	September 26, 2006	Kitt Peak	Spacewatch	KOR	1.1 km	MPC · JPL
611166	2006 SH_{253}	—	September 26, 2006	Mount Lemmon	Mount Lemmon Survey	AGN	970 m	MPC · JPL
611167	2006 SW_{255}	—	August 19, 2006	Kitt Peak	Spacewatch	·	1.7 km	MPC · JPL
611168	2006 SU_{272}	—	September 27, 2006	Kitt Peak	Spacewatch	V	680 m	MPC · JPL
611169	2006 SN_{277}	—	September 28, 2006	Kitt Peak	Spacewatch	·	1.7 km	MPC · JPL
611170	2006 SV_{294}	—	September 17, 2006	Kitt Peak	Spacewatch	·	1.4 km	MPC · JPL
611171	2006 SC_{305}	—	September 27, 2006	Kitt Peak	Spacewatch	HOF	2.9 km	MPC · JPL
611172	2006 SS_{308}	—	September 17, 2006	Kitt Peak	Spacewatch	·	1.8 km	MPC · JPL
611173	2006 SS_{317}	—	September 27, 2006	Kitt Peak	Spacewatch	HOF	1.9 km	MPC · JPL
611174	2006 SY_{321}	—	September 27, 2006	Kitt Peak	Spacewatch	·	1.0 km	MPC · JPL
611175	2006 SK_{322}	—	July 21, 2006	Mount Lemmon	Mount Lemmon Survey	·	1.6 km	MPC · JPL
611176	2006 SR_{325}	—	September 19, 2006	Kitt Peak	Spacewatch	KOR	1.1 km	MPC · JPL
611177	2006 ST_{329}	—	September 27, 2006	Kitt Peak	Spacewatch	AST	1.5 km	MPC · JPL
611178	2006 SX_{329}	—	September 27, 2006	Kitt Peak	Spacewatch	KOR	1.2 km	MPC · JPL
611179	2006 SS_{330}	—	September 28, 2006	Kitt Peak	Spacewatch	·	2.3 km	MPC · JPL
611180	2006 SL_{334}	—	September 28, 2006	Kitt Peak	Spacewatch	KOR	1.2 km	MPC · JPL
611181	2006 SZ_{334}	—	September 28, 2006	Kitt Peak	Spacewatch	AGN	1.1 km	MPC · JPL
611182	2006 SQ_{336}	—	September 14, 2006	Kitt Peak	Spacewatch	HOF	2.3 km	MPC · JPL
611183	2006 SV_{336}	—	September 28, 2006	Kitt Peak	Spacewatch	·	2.4 km	MPC · JPL
611184	2006 SO_{338}	—	September 14, 2006	Kitt Peak	Spacewatch	·	1.7 km	MPC · JPL
611185	2006 SU_{340}	—	September 28, 2006	Kitt Peak	Spacewatch	AGN	1.0 km	MPC · JPL
611186	2006 SS_{341}	—	September 28, 2006	Kitt Peak	Spacewatch	HOF	2.0 km	MPC · JPL
611187	2006 SY_{342}	—	September 28, 2006	Kitt Peak	Spacewatch	HOF	2.9 km	MPC · JPL
611188	2006 SU_{344}	—	September 28, 2006	Kitt Peak	Spacewatch	·	1.6 km	MPC · JPL
611189	2006 SL_{345}	—	September 28, 2006	Kitt Peak	Spacewatch	·	1.1 km	MPC · JPL
611190	2006 SY_{347}	—	September 24, 2006	Kitt Peak	Spacewatch	KOR	1.0 km	MPC · JPL
611191	2006 SF_{348}	—	September 18, 2006	Kitt Peak	Spacewatch	·	2.0 km	MPC · JPL
611192	2006 SQ_{357}	—	September 30, 2006	Mount Lemmon	Mount Lemmon Survey	·	1.8 km	MPC · JPL
611193	2006 SQ_{361}	—	September 30, 2006	Mount Lemmon	Mount Lemmon Survey	·	2.1 km	MPC · JPL
611194	2006 SY_{363}	—	September 27, 2006	Kitt Peak	Spacewatch	·	1.8 km	MPC · JPL
611195	2006 SF_{370}	—	September 19, 2006	Catalina	CSS	DOR	2.0 km	MPC · JPL
611196	2006 SY_{379}	—	September 27, 2006	Apache Point	SDSS Collaboration	·	1.8 km	MPC · JPL
611197	2006 SE_{381}	—	September 27, 2006	Apache Point	SDSS Collaboration	·	1.9 km	MPC · JPL
611198	2006 SG_{382}	—	September 18, 2006	Apache Point	SDSS Collaboration	·	4.7 km	MPC · JPL
611199	2006 SG_{388}	—	September 30, 2006	Apache Point	SDSS Collaboration	·	2.0 km	MPC · JPL
611200	2006 SJ_{394}	—	August 28, 2006	Apache Point	SDSS Collaboration	V	430 m	MPC · JPL

== 611201–611300 ==
back to top

Designation			Discovery			Properties		Ref
Permanent	Provisional	Named after	Date	Site	Discoverer(s)	Category	Diam.	Ref
611201	2006 SW_{397}	—	September 28, 2006	Mount Lemmon	Mount Lemmon Survey	·	810 m	MPC · JPL
611202	2006 SZ_{397}	—	September 27, 2006	Mount Lemmon	Mount Lemmon Survey	·	1.1 km	MPC · JPL
611203	2006 SQ_{406}	—	September 18, 2006	Kitt Peak	Spacewatch	·	1.7 km	MPC · JPL
611204	2006 SS_{407}	—	September 25, 2006	Kitt Peak	Spacewatch	·	410 m	MPC · JPL
611205	2006 SN_{409}	—	August 19, 2006	Kitt Peak	Spacewatch	·	1.5 km	MPC · JPL
611206	2006 SB_{410}	—	September 17, 2006	Kitt Peak	Spacewatch	·	790 m	MPC · JPL
611207	2006 SJ_{411}	—	September 30, 2006	Mount Lemmon	Mount Lemmon Survey	·	1.6 km	MPC · JPL
611208	2006 SK_{411}	—	September 30, 2006	Mount Lemmon	Mount Lemmon Survey	·	1.4 km	MPC · JPL
611209	2006 SK_{416}	—	September 28, 2006	Kitt Peak	Spacewatch	·	1.3 km	MPC · JPL
611210	2006 SL_{416}	—	December 21, 2014	Haleakala	Pan-STARRS 1	V	570 m	MPC · JPL
611211	2006 SA_{421}	—	January 10, 2013	Haleakala	Pan-STARRS 1	·	1.9 km	MPC · JPL
611212	2006 SA_{423}	—	September 25, 2006	Mount Lemmon	Mount Lemmon Survey	·	590 m	MPC · JPL
611213	2006 SD_{423}	—	September 25, 2006	Catalina	CSS	·	2.1 km	MPC · JPL
611214	2006 SE_{424}	—	September 15, 2006	Kitt Peak	Spacewatch	·	1.3 km	MPC · JPL
611215	2006 SH_{425}	—	September 18, 2006	Kitt Peak	Spacewatch	·	920 m	MPC · JPL
611216	2006 SQ_{425}	—	September 25, 2006	Kitt Peak	Spacewatch	V	480 m	MPC · JPL
611217	2006 SR_{425}	—	February 17, 2015	Haleakala	Pan-STARRS 1	·	780 m	MPC · JPL
611218	2006 SS_{425}	—	September 27, 2006	Kitt Peak	Spacewatch	·	680 m	MPC · JPL
611219	2006 SC_{426}	—	July 1, 2013	Haleakala	Pan-STARRS 1	MAS	520 m	MPC · JPL
611220	2006 SD_{426}	—	September 19, 2006	Kitt Peak	Spacewatch	·	660 m	MPC · JPL
611221	2006 SE_{428}	—	February 1, 2015	Haleakala	Pan-STARRS 1	NYS	760 m	MPC · JPL
611222	2006 SO_{431}	—	September 17, 2006	Kitt Peak	Spacewatch	·	870 m	MPC · JPL
611223	2006 SC_{433}	—	December 31, 2007	Mount Lemmon	Mount Lemmon Survey	·	830 m	MPC · JPL
611224	2006 SS_{433}	—	December 18, 2007	Kitt Peak	Spacewatch	AGN	1.0 km	MPC · JPL
611225	2006 SV_{433}	—	October 21, 2017	Mount Lemmon	Mount Lemmon Survey	·	770 m	MPC · JPL
611226	2006 SY_{433}	—	December 18, 2007	Mount Lemmon	Mount Lemmon Survey	·	1.7 km	MPC · JPL
611227	2006 SP_{434}	—	March 13, 2012	Mount Lemmon	Mount Lemmon Survey	BAP	620 m	MPC · JPL
611228	2006 SX_{434}	—	September 15, 2006	Kitt Peak	Spacewatch	AGN	990 m	MPC · JPL
611229	2006 SB_{437}	—	January 16, 2015	Haleakala	Pan-STARRS 1	·	590 m	MPC · JPL
611230	2006 SN_{439}	—	March 5, 2013	Elena Remote	Oreshko, A.	·	2.0 km	MPC · JPL
611231	2006 SS_{439}	—	February 25, 2012	Catalina	CSS	·	1.0 km	MPC · JPL
611232	2006 SZ_{439}	—	September 17, 2006	Kitt Peak	Spacewatch	·	1.5 km	MPC · JPL
611233	2006 SC_{440}	—	September 2, 2011	Haleakala	Pan-STARRS 1	·	1.5 km	MPC · JPL
611234	2006 SD_{440}	—	October 24, 2011	Haleakala	Pan-STARRS 1	·	1.5 km	MPC · JPL
611235	2006 SF_{440}	—	May 6, 2014	Haleakala	Pan-STARRS 1	·	1.5 km	MPC · JPL
611236	2006 SO_{440}	—	October 21, 2011	Kitt Peak	Spacewatch	AGN	1.0 km	MPC · JPL
611237	2006 SZ_{440}	—	December 23, 2012	Haleakala	Pan-STARRS 1	·	1.3 km	MPC · JPL
611238	2006 SR_{445}	—	September 16, 2006	Kitt Peak	Spacewatch	·	790 m	MPC · JPL
611239	2006 SS_{448}	—	September 30, 2006	Mount Lemmon	Mount Lemmon Survey	V	430 m	MPC · JPL
611240	2006 SA_{449}	—	September 17, 2006	Kitt Peak	Spacewatch	KOR	1.0 km	MPC · JPL
611241	2006 SJ_{449}	—	September 20, 2006	Catalina	CSS	·	1.8 km	MPC · JPL
611242	2006 SQ_{449}	—	September 18, 2006	Kitt Peak	Spacewatch	·	1.6 km	MPC · JPL
611243	2006 SP_{450}	—	September 28, 2006	Kitt Peak	Spacewatch	·	1.5 km	MPC · JPL
611244	2006 SL_{451}	—	September 27, 2006	Mount Lemmon	Mount Lemmon Survey	KOR	1.2 km	MPC · JPL
611245	2006 SC_{452}	—	September 25, 2006	Kitt Peak	Spacewatch	·	1.7 km	MPC · JPL
611246	2006 SE_{452}	—	September 27, 2006	Mount Lemmon	Mount Lemmon Survey	KOR	1.3 km	MPC · JPL
611247	2006 SJ_{455}	—	September 25, 2006	Kitt Peak	Spacewatch	·	1.4 km	MPC · JPL
611248	2006 TO_{3}	—	October 2, 2006	Mount Lemmon	Mount Lemmon Survey	·	1.3 km	MPC · JPL
611249	2006 TV_{5}	—	July 5, 2005	Mount Lemmon	Mount Lemmon Survey	·	2.1 km	MPC · JPL
611250	2006 TE_{7}	—	September 28, 2006	Kitt Peak	Spacewatch	·	830 m	MPC · JPL
611251	2006 TF_{11}	—	October 14, 2006	Piszkéstető	K. Sárneczky, Kuli, Z.	V	480 m	MPC · JPL
611252	2006 TF_{12}	—	October 4, 2006	Mount Lemmon	Mount Lemmon Survey	·	1.3 km	MPC · JPL
611253	2006 TC_{13}	—	October 10, 2006	Palomar	NEAT	·	970 m	MPC · JPL
611254	2006 TK_{15}	—	September 19, 2006	Kitt Peak	Spacewatch	NYS	770 m	MPC · JPL
611255	2006 TX_{15}	—	September 26, 2006	Kitt Peak	Spacewatch	KOR	1.2 km	MPC · JPL
611256	2006 TR_{26}	—	September 25, 2006	Mount Lemmon	Mount Lemmon Survey	·	840 m	MPC · JPL
611257	2006 TQ_{45}	—	September 30, 2006	Mount Lemmon	Mount Lemmon Survey	·	890 m	MPC · JPL
611258	2006 TO_{65}	—	September 28, 2006	Catalina	CSS	BRA	1.4 km	MPC · JPL
611259	2006 TY_{79}	—	October 4, 2006	Mount Lemmon	Mount Lemmon Survey	·	850 m	MPC · JPL
611260	2006 TY_{104}	—	September 30, 2006	Mount Lemmon	Mount Lemmon Survey	EUN	930 m	MPC · JPL
611261	2006 TP_{110}	—	September 14, 2006	Kitt Peak	Spacewatch	·	1.9 km	MPC · JPL
611262	2006 TC_{117}	—	October 1, 2006	Apache Point	SDSS Collaboration	·	1.8 km	MPC · JPL
611263	2006 TX_{118}	—	August 28, 2006	Apache Point	SDSS Collaboration	·	1.7 km	MPC · JPL
611264	2006 TY_{119}	—	October 12, 2006	Apache Point	SDSS Collaboration	KOR	990 m	MPC · JPL
611265	2006 TA_{127}	—	October 3, 2006	Mount Lemmon	Mount Lemmon Survey	·	1.4 km	MPC · JPL
611266	2006 TK_{129}	—	October 13, 2006	Kitt Peak	Spacewatch	·	750 m	MPC · JPL
611267	2006 TP_{131}	—	October 2, 2006	Mount Lemmon	Mount Lemmon Survey	HOF	2.1 km	MPC · JPL
611268	2006 TT_{131}	—	October 2, 2006	Mount Lemmon	Mount Lemmon Survey	ERI	940 m	MPC · JPL
611269	2006 TW_{132}	—	October 3, 2006	Mount Lemmon	Mount Lemmon Survey	·	770 m	MPC · JPL
611270	2006 TN_{134}	—	October 2, 2006	Mount Lemmon	Mount Lemmon Survey	·	800 m	MPC · JPL
611271	2006 TO_{135}	—	October 21, 2011	Mount Lemmon	Mount Lemmon Survey	·	2.2 km	MPC · JPL
611272	2006 TG_{136}	—	December 19, 2007	Mount Lemmon	Mount Lemmon Survey	·	1.6 km	MPC · JPL
611273	2006 TH_{137}	—	October 2, 2006	Mount Lemmon	Mount Lemmon Survey	KOR	1.2 km	MPC · JPL
611274	2006 TK_{137}	—	October 2, 2006	Mount Lemmon	Mount Lemmon Survey	AGN	1.1 km	MPC · JPL
611275	2006 TO_{137}	—	December 23, 2012	Haleakala	Pan-STARRS 1	·	1.7 km	MPC · JPL
611276	2006 TB_{138}	—	October 2, 2006	Mount Lemmon	Mount Lemmon Survey	·	1.5 km	MPC · JPL
611277	2006 TA_{141}	—	October 2, 2006	Mount Lemmon	Mount Lemmon Survey	·	2.1 km	MPC · JPL
611278	2006 TG_{141}	—	October 2, 2006	Mount Lemmon	Mount Lemmon Survey	KOR	1.2 km	MPC · JPL
611279	2006 UA_{2}	—	October 17, 2006	Piszkéstető	K. Sárneczky, Kuli, Z.	MAS	460 m	MPC · JPL
611280	2006 UJ_{12}	—	October 2, 2006	Mount Lemmon	Mount Lemmon Survey	·	1.9 km	MPC · JPL
611281	2006 UB_{16}	—	September 30, 2006	Mount Lemmon	Mount Lemmon Survey	·	930 m	MPC · JPL
611282	2006 UG_{16}	—	September 30, 2006	Mount Lemmon	Mount Lemmon Survey	NYS	990 m	MPC · JPL
611283	2006 UQ_{18}	—	October 16, 2006	Kitt Peak	Spacewatch	·	730 m	MPC · JPL
611284	2006 UR_{20}	—	October 16, 2006	Kitt Peak	Spacewatch	CLA	1.1 km	MPC · JPL
611285	2006 UM_{27}	—	September 25, 2006	Mount Lemmon	Mount Lemmon Survey	MAS	540 m	MPC · JPL
611286	2006 UG_{28}	—	October 16, 2006	Kitt Peak	Spacewatch	AGN	1.3 km	MPC · JPL
611287	2006 US_{28}	—	October 16, 2006	Kitt Peak	Spacewatch	·	1.2 km	MPC · JPL
611288	2006 UC_{35}	—	September 26, 2006	Mount Lemmon	Mount Lemmon Survey	·	1.5 km	MPC · JPL
611289	2006 UC_{41}	—	October 16, 2006	Kitt Peak	Spacewatch	·	1.4 km	MPC · JPL
611290	2006 UD_{42}	—	October 16, 2006	Kitt Peak	Spacewatch	·	2.0 km	MPC · JPL
611291	2006 UG_{47}	—	October 16, 2006	Kitt Peak	Spacewatch	·	1.1 km	MPC · JPL
611292	2006 UX_{49}	—	October 17, 2006	Kitt Peak	Spacewatch	·	1.8 km	MPC · JPL
611293	2006 UO_{50}	—	September 30, 2006	Kitt Peak	Spacewatch	·	990 m	MPC · JPL
611294	2006 UU_{55}	—	October 18, 2006	Kitt Peak	Spacewatch	GEF	810 m	MPC · JPL
611295	2006 UB_{60}	—	October 19, 2006	Catalina	CSS	·	960 m	MPC · JPL
611296	2006 UX_{66}	—	September 18, 2006	Kitt Peak	Spacewatch	MAS	500 m	MPC · JPL
611297	2006 UY_{75}	—	October 1, 2006	Kitt Peak	Spacewatch	·	700 m	MPC · JPL
611298	2006 UC_{93}	—	October 2, 2006	Mount Lemmon	Mount Lemmon Survey	·	710 m	MPC · JPL
611299	2006 UR_{97}	—	October 3, 2006	Mount Lemmon	Mount Lemmon Survey	·	1.3 km	MPC · JPL
611300	2006 UO_{103}	—	September 30, 2006	Mount Lemmon	Mount Lemmon Survey	·	1.6 km	MPC · JPL

== 611301–611400 ==
back to top

Designation			Discovery			Properties		Ref
Permanent	Provisional	Named after	Date	Site	Discoverer(s)	Category	Diam.	Ref
611301	2006 UT_{109}	—	October 19, 2006	Kitt Peak	Spacewatch	V	590 m	MPC · JPL
611302	2006 UK_{113}	—	October 19, 2006	Kitt Peak	Spacewatch	AGN	1.1 km	MPC · JPL
611303	2006 UP_{115}	—	October 19, 2006	Kitt Peak	Spacewatch	AGN	1.0 km	MPC · JPL
611304	2006 UK_{119}	—	October 19, 2006	Kitt Peak	Spacewatch	·	1.6 km	MPC · JPL
611305	2006 UZ_{126}	—	October 2, 2006	Mount Lemmon	Mount Lemmon Survey	·	1.5 km	MPC · JPL
611306	2006 UF_{129}	—	October 19, 2006	Kitt Peak	Spacewatch	·	760 m	MPC · JPL
611307	2006 UD_{131}	—	September 27, 2006	Mount Lemmon	Mount Lemmon Survey	·	1.5 km	MPC · JPL
611308	2006 UH_{136}	—	October 19, 2006	Mount Lemmon	Mount Lemmon Survey	·	950 m	MPC · JPL
611309	2006 UG_{137}	—	April 13, 2004	Kitt Peak	Spacewatch	·	2.1 km	MPC · JPL
611310	2006 UK_{142}	—	October 19, 2006	Kitt Peak	Spacewatch	·	1.6 km	MPC · JPL
611311	2006 UZ_{144}	—	October 20, 2006	Kitt Peak	Spacewatch	·	2.0 km	MPC · JPL
611312	2006 UH_{145}	—	October 20, 2006	Kitt Peak	Spacewatch	V	600 m	MPC · JPL
611313	2006 UD_{148}	—	September 15, 2006	Kitt Peak	Spacewatch	·	1.6 km	MPC · JPL
611314	2006 UN_{148}	—	August 27, 2006	Kitt Peak	Spacewatch	MAS	460 m	MPC · JPL
611315	2006 UX_{153}	—	August 21, 2006	Kitt Peak	Spacewatch	·	1.7 km	MPC · JPL
611316	2006 UT_{156}	—	September 21, 2001	Kitt Peak	Spacewatch	·	1.4 km	MPC · JPL
611317	2006 UU_{160}	—	October 21, 2006	Mount Lemmon	Mount Lemmon Survey	·	880 m	MPC · JPL
611318	2006 UJ_{171}	—	October 3, 2006	Mount Lemmon	Mount Lemmon Survey	HOF	2.2 km	MPC · JPL
611319	2006 UU_{172}	—	March 29, 2004	Kitt Peak	Spacewatch	·	2.0 km	MPC · JPL
611320	2006 UA_{173}	—	September 25, 2006	Mount Lemmon	Mount Lemmon Survey	·	1.4 km	MPC · JPL
611321	2006 UE_{173}	—	October 16, 2006	Catalina	CSS	·	2.5 km	MPC · JPL
611322	2006 UB_{186}	—	October 11, 2006	Palomar	NEAT	·	1.3 km	MPC · JPL
611323	2006 UB_{195}	—	October 20, 2006	Kitt Peak	Spacewatch	·	1.5 km	MPC · JPL
611324	2006 UW_{196}	—	October 20, 2006	Kitt Peak	Spacewatch	·	720 m	MPC · JPL
611325	2006 UV_{199}	—	October 21, 2006	Mount Lemmon	Mount Lemmon Survey	·	1.0 km	MPC · JPL
611326 Wilfredbuck	2006 UT_{216}	Wilfredbuck	October 23, 2006	Mauna Kea	D. D. Balam	HOF	1.9 km	MPC · JPL
611327	2006 UZ_{222}	—	October 11, 2006	Palomar	NEAT	·	1.0 km	MPC · JPL
611328	2006 UA_{240}	—	September 27, 2006	Mount Lemmon	Mount Lemmon Survey	KOR	1.1 km	MPC · JPL
611329	2006 UY_{242}	—	September 17, 2006	Kitt Peak	Spacewatch	MAS	660 m	MPC · JPL
611330	2006 UF_{247}	—	April 25, 2004	Kitt Peak	Spacewatch	·	1.6 km	MPC · JPL
611331	2006 US_{247}	—	October 27, 2006	Mount Lemmon	Mount Lemmon Survey	·	1.3 km	MPC · JPL
611332	2006 UB_{251}	—	October 27, 2006	Mount Lemmon	Mount Lemmon Survey	KOR	1.1 km	MPC · JPL
611333	2006 UJ_{251}	—	October 27, 2006	Mount Lemmon	Mount Lemmon Survey	MAS	570 m	MPC · JPL
611334	2006 UT_{252}	—	October 20, 2006	Kitt Peak	Spacewatch	·	920 m	MPC · JPL
611335	2006 UU_{252}	—	October 20, 2006	Kitt Peak	Spacewatch	KOR	1.1 km	MPC · JPL
611336	2006 UP_{255}	—	October 27, 2006	Mount Lemmon	Mount Lemmon Survey	KOR	1 km	MPC · JPL
611337	2006 UR_{267}	—	October 27, 2006	Mount Lemmon	Mount Lemmon Survey	·	1.1 km	MPC · JPL
611338	2006 UB_{269}	—	October 21, 2006	Kitt Peak	Spacewatch	H	320 m	MPC · JPL
611339	2006 UE_{275}	—	September 30, 2006	Kitt Peak	Spacewatch	PHO	760 m	MPC · JPL
611340	2006 UM_{275}	—	October 20, 2006	Kitt Peak	Spacewatch	·	1.7 km	MPC · JPL
611341	2006 UM_{277}	—	October 19, 2006	Kitt Peak	Spacewatch	·	1.7 km	MPC · JPL
611342	2006 UJ_{280}	—	October 28, 2006	Mount Lemmon	Mount Lemmon Survey	KOR	1.4 km	MPC · JPL
611343	2006 UP_{287}	—	October 29, 2006	Mount Lemmon	Mount Lemmon Survey	·	1.5 km	MPC · JPL
611344	2006 UA_{293}	—	September 25, 2006	Mount Lemmon	Mount Lemmon Survey	·	1.4 km	MPC · JPL
611345	2006 UW_{294}	—	October 19, 2006	Kitt Peak	Deep Ecliptic Survey	·	1.2 km	MPC · JPL
611346	2006 UT_{296}	—	October 19, 2006	Kitt Peak	Deep Ecliptic Survey	·	1.5 km	MPC · JPL
611347	2006 UP_{298}	—	October 19, 2006	Kitt Peak	Deep Ecliptic Survey	·	1.5 km	MPC · JPL
611348	2006 UF_{311}	—	September 25, 2006	Mount Lemmon	Mount Lemmon Survey	·	1.7 km	MPC · JPL
611349	2006 UK_{313}	—	November 18, 2006	Kitt Peak	Spacewatch	V	650 m	MPC · JPL
611350	2006 UR_{316}	—	November 16, 2006	Kitt Peak	Spacewatch	·	790 m	MPC · JPL
611351	2006 UG_{322}	—	September 25, 2006	Mount Lemmon	Mount Lemmon Survey	KOR	1.1 km	MPC · JPL
611352	2006 UK_{325}	—	October 21, 2006	Mount Lemmon	Mount Lemmon Survey	·	1.5 km	MPC · JPL
611353	2006 UY_{333}	—	October 17, 2006	Apache Point	SDSS Collaboration	BRA	1.3 km	MPC · JPL
611354	2006 UM_{337}	—	December 7, 2001	Kitt Peak	Spacewatch	KOR	1.2 km	MPC · JPL
611355	2006 UE_{342}	—	November 12, 2006	Mount Lemmon	Mount Lemmon Survey	·	910 m	MPC · JPL
611356	2006 UX_{348}	—	November 1, 2006	Kitt Peak	Spacewatch	·	810 m	MPC · JPL
611357	2006 UJ_{351}	—	November 12, 2006	Mount Lemmon	Mount Lemmon Survey	KOR	910 m	MPC · JPL
611358	2006 UM_{355}	—	October 26, 2006	Mauna Kea	P. A. Wiegert	KOR	1.1 km	MPC · JPL
611359	2006 UP_{359}	—	October 21, 2006	Kitt Peak	Spacewatch	·	1.6 km	MPC · JPL
611360	2006 UL_{364}	—	October 21, 2006	Catalina	CSS	·	1.2 km	MPC · JPL
611361	2006 UF_{366}	—	October 18, 2006	Kitt Peak	Spacewatch	MAS	480 m	MPC · JPL
611362	2006 UJ_{366}	—	March 14, 2012	Mount Lemmon	Mount Lemmon Survey	·	1.3 km	MPC · JPL
611363	2006 UK_{366}	—	September 10, 2013	Haleakala	Pan-STARRS 1	V	480 m	MPC · JPL
611364	2006 UZ_{366}	—	October 21, 2006	Kitt Peak	Spacewatch	·	810 m	MPC · JPL
611365	2006 UE_{367}	—	October 21, 2006	Kitt Peak	Spacewatch	·	990 m	MPC · JPL
611366	2006 UJ_{367}	—	October 22, 2006	Kitt Peak	Spacewatch	·	770 m	MPC · JPL
611367	2006 UR_{367}	—	September 20, 2006	Kitt Peak	Spacewatch	·	790 m	MPC · JPL
611368	2006 UA_{368}	—	October 21, 2006	Kitt Peak	Spacewatch	·	890 m	MPC · JPL
611369	2006 UX_{373}	—	August 10, 2010	Kitt Peak	Spacewatch	·	1.9 km	MPC · JPL
611370	2006 UJ_{374}	—	January 17, 2013	Haleakala	Pan-STARRS 1	·	1.6 km	MPC · JPL
611371	2006 UM_{374}	—	October 18, 2006	Kitt Peak	Spacewatch	NYS	910 m	MPC · JPL
611372	2006 UT_{374}	—	October 20, 2006	Mount Lemmon	Mount Lemmon Survey	·	890 m	MPC · JPL
611373	2006 UK_{377}	—	January 2, 2008	Bergisch Gladbach	W. Bickel	KOR	1.0 km	MPC · JPL
611374	2006 UM_{377}	—	June 22, 2010	Kitt Peak	Spacewatch	·	1.9 km	MPC · JPL
611375	2006 UQ_{377}	—	December 10, 2010	Kitt Peak	Spacewatch	MAS	490 m	MPC · JPL
611376	2006 UU_{377}	—	October 20, 2011	Mount Lemmon	Mount Lemmon Survey	·	1.6 km	MPC · JPL
611377	2006 UA_{378}	—	March 21, 2012	Mount Lemmon	Mount Lemmon Survey	·	960 m	MPC · JPL
611378	2006 UT_{378}	—	October 8, 2015	Mount Lemmon	Mount Lemmon Survey	·	1.4 km	MPC · JPL
611379	2006 UL_{379}	—	October 3, 2006	Mount Lemmon	Mount Lemmon Survey	NYS	770 m	MPC · JPL
611380	2006 UP_{379}	—	June 26, 2015	Haleakala	Pan-STARRS 1	·	1.5 km	MPC · JPL
611381	2006 UB_{380}	—	October 30, 2017	Haleakala	Pan-STARRS 1	V	430 m	MPC · JPL
611382	2006 UV_{380}	—	February 19, 2013	Kitt Peak	Spacewatch	AGN	950 m	MPC · JPL
611383	2006 UV_{381}	—	October 23, 2006	Kitt Peak	Spacewatch	KOR	1.1 km	MPC · JPL
611384	2006 UJ_{382}	—	February 28, 2012	Haleakala	Pan-STARRS 1	·	920 m	MPC · JPL
611385	2006 UE_{384}	—	October 23, 2006	Mount Lemmon	Mount Lemmon Survey	·	2.0 km	MPC · JPL
611386	2006 UK_{384}	—	October 18, 2006	Kitt Peak	Spacewatch	KOR	1.1 km	MPC · JPL
611387	2006 UL_{384}	—	October 21, 2006	Mount Lemmon	Mount Lemmon Survey	·	960 m	MPC · JPL
611388	2006 US_{385}	—	October 23, 2006	Kitt Peak	Spacewatch	·	1.8 km	MPC · JPL
611389	2006 UZ_{385}	—	October 16, 2006	Kitt Peak	Spacewatch	KOR	960 m	MPC · JPL
611390	2006 UC_{386}	—	October 21, 2006	Mount Lemmon	Mount Lemmon Survey	KOR	950 m	MPC · JPL
611391	2006 UH_{386}	—	October 21, 2006	Kitt Peak	Spacewatch	·	1.9 km	MPC · JPL
611392	2006 UW_{386}	—	October 31, 2006	Mount Lemmon	Mount Lemmon Survey	KOR	1.3 km	MPC · JPL
611393	2006 UY_{387}	—	October 21, 2006	Mount Lemmon	Mount Lemmon Survey	·	1.6 km	MPC · JPL
611394	2006 UZ_{387}	—	October 31, 2006	Mount Lemmon	Mount Lemmon Survey	·	1.8 km	MPC · JPL
611395	2006 UG_{392}	—	October 31, 2006	Mount Lemmon	Mount Lemmon Survey	·	1.1 km	MPC · JPL
611396	2006 VV	—	November 1, 2006	Mount Lemmon	Mount Lemmon Survey	V	680 m	MPC · JPL
611397	2006 VK_{5}	—	September 26, 2006	Mount Lemmon	Mount Lemmon Survey	·	1.5 km	MPC · JPL
611398	2006 VA_{11}	—	October 17, 2006	Mount Lemmon	Mount Lemmon Survey	·	1.1 km	MPC · JPL
611399	2006 VK_{12}	—	November 11, 2006	Mount Lemmon	Mount Lemmon Survey	MAS	590 m	MPC · JPL
611400	2006 VH_{15}	—	September 27, 2006	Mount Lemmon	Mount Lemmon Survey	NYS	920 m	MPC · JPL

== 611401–611500 ==
back to top

Designation			Discovery			Properties		Ref
Permanent	Provisional	Named after	Date	Site	Discoverer(s)	Category	Diam.	Ref
611401	2006 VW_{16}	—	October 21, 2006	Kitt Peak	Spacewatch	MAS	590 m	MPC · JPL
611402	2006 VY_{17}	—	October 31, 2006	Mount Lemmon	Mount Lemmon Survey	·	1.6 km	MPC · JPL
611403	2006 VS_{19}	—	October 27, 2006	Kitt Peak	Spacewatch	·	1.8 km	MPC · JPL
611404	2006 VK_{24}	—	September 27, 2006	Mount Lemmon	Mount Lemmon Survey	·	1.2 km	MPC · JPL
611405	2006 VV_{25}	—	November 10, 2006	Kitt Peak	Spacewatch	KOR	1.3 km	MPC · JPL
611406	2006 VA_{26}	—	November 10, 2006	Kitt Peak	Spacewatch	KOR	1.1 km	MPC · JPL
611407	2006 VW_{33}	—	November 11, 2006	Mount Lemmon	Mount Lemmon Survey	KOR	1.3 km	MPC · JPL
611408	2006 VD_{55}	—	October 19, 2006	Mount Lemmon	Mount Lemmon Survey	MAS	530 m	MPC · JPL
611409	2006 VA_{56}	—	November 11, 2006	Kitt Peak	Spacewatch	MAS	450 m	MPC · JPL
611410	2006 VR_{62}	—	November 11, 2006	Kitt Peak	Spacewatch	KOR	1.6 km	MPC · JPL
611411	2006 VT_{62}	—	November 11, 2006	Kitt Peak	Spacewatch	NAE	1.9 km	MPC · JPL
611412	2006 VC_{64}	—	September 28, 2001	Palomar	NEAT	MRX	980 m	MPC · JPL
611413	2006 VO_{80}	—	October 22, 2006	Mount Lemmon	Mount Lemmon Survey	·	1.7 km	MPC · JPL
611414	2006 VC_{86}	—	October 2, 2006	Mount Lemmon	Mount Lemmon Survey	·	990 m	MPC · JPL
611415	2006 VC_{91}	—	October 19, 2006	Kitt Peak	Spacewatch	·	1.7 km	MPC · JPL
611416	2006 VP_{103}	—	February 2, 2000	Kitt Peak	Spacewatch	·	1.2 km	MPC · JPL
611417	2006 VS_{117}	—	October 28, 2006	Mount Lemmon	Mount Lemmon Survey	·	2.0 km	MPC · JPL
611418	2006 VU_{125}	—	November 14, 2006	Kitt Peak	Spacewatch	·	1 km	MPC · JPL
611419	2006 VS_{127}	—	November 15, 2006	Kitt Peak	Spacewatch	·	1.6 km	MPC · JPL
611420	2006 VS_{129}	—	November 15, 2006	Kitt Peak	Spacewatch	·	2.1 km	MPC · JPL
611421	2006 VD_{130}	—	November 15, 2006	Kitt Peak	Spacewatch	·	1.5 km	MPC · JPL
611422	2006 VK_{135}	—	November 15, 2006	Kitt Peak	Spacewatch	KOR	1 km	MPC · JPL
611423	2006 VT_{135}	—	November 15, 2006	Kitt Peak	Spacewatch	KOR	1.1 km	MPC · JPL
611424	2006 VR_{175}	—	November 12, 2006	Mount Lemmon	Mount Lemmon Survey	·	720 m	MPC · JPL
611425	2006 VN_{176}	—	October 31, 2006	Kitt Peak	Spacewatch	PHO	960 m	MPC · JPL
611426	2006 VA_{177}	—	November 11, 2006	Kitt Peak	Spacewatch	NYS	770 m	MPC · JPL
611427	2006 VR_{178}	—	May 29, 2012	Mount Lemmon	Mount Lemmon Survey	·	810 m	MPC · JPL
611428	2006 VF_{180}	—	July 28, 2009	Kitt Peak	Spacewatch	NYS	1.2 km	MPC · JPL
611429	2006 VV_{180}	—	March 4, 2016	Haleakala	Pan-STARRS 1	·	960 m	MPC · JPL
611430	2006 VK_{181}	—	November 15, 2006	Kitt Peak	Spacewatch	KOR	1.1 km	MPC · JPL
611431	2006 VT_{182}	—	November 15, 2006	Mount Lemmon	Mount Lemmon Survey	·	1.6 km	MPC · JPL
611432	2006 VJ_{183}	—	November 11, 2006	Mount Lemmon	Mount Lemmon Survey	·	970 m	MPC · JPL
611433	2006 VK_{183}	—	November 2, 2006	Mount Lemmon	Mount Lemmon Survey	·	2.1 km	MPC · JPL
611434	2006 VC_{186}	—	November 14, 2006	Kitt Peak	Spacewatch	·	1.5 km	MPC · JPL
611435	2006 WQ_{5}	—	October 23, 2006	Mount Lemmon	Mount Lemmon Survey	·	850 m	MPC · JPL
611436	2006 WO_{9}	—	November 16, 2006	Kitt Peak	Spacewatch	·	1.7 km	MPC · JPL
611437	2006 WY_{20}	—	November 17, 2006	Mount Lemmon	Mount Lemmon Survey	(16286)	1.9 km	MPC · JPL
611438	2006 WG_{25}	—	November 17, 2006	Mount Lemmon	Mount Lemmon Survey	·	810 m	MPC · JPL
611439	2006 WK_{27}	—	October 27, 2006	Mount Lemmon	Mount Lemmon Survey	·	1.0 km	MPC · JPL
611440	2006 WT_{30}	—	October 21, 2006	Kitt Peak	Spacewatch	·	1.7 km	MPC · JPL
611441	2006 WY_{43}	—	November 16, 2006	Mount Lemmon	Mount Lemmon Survey	·	1.8 km	MPC · JPL
611442	2006 WU_{45}	—	October 3, 2006	Mount Lemmon	Mount Lemmon Survey	AGN	1.3 km	MPC · JPL
611443	2006 WF_{53}	—	November 16, 2006	Catalina	CSS	·	1.5 km	MPC · JPL
611444	2006 WW_{53}	—	November 16, 2006	Kitt Peak	Spacewatch	·	830 m	MPC · JPL
611445	2006 WW_{56}	—	August 6, 2005	Palomar	NEAT	·	2.4 km	MPC · JPL
611446	2006 WG_{63}	—	November 17, 2006	Mount Lemmon	Mount Lemmon Survey	·	1.0 km	MPC · JPL
611447	2006 WE_{66}	—	November 17, 2006	Mount Lemmon	Mount Lemmon Survey	615	1.1 km	MPC · JPL
611448	2006 WW_{69}	—	September 25, 2006	Kitt Peak	Spacewatch	·	830 m	MPC · JPL
611449	2006 WC_{77}	—	October 31, 2006	Mount Lemmon	Mount Lemmon Survey	AST	1.6 km	MPC · JPL
611450	2006 WM_{77}	—	September 27, 2006	Mount Lemmon	Mount Lemmon Survey	KOR	1.6 km	MPC · JPL
611451	2006 WH_{80}	—	November 18, 2006	Kitt Peak	Spacewatch	·	1.9 km	MPC · JPL
611452	2006 WF_{84}	—	November 18, 2006	Mount Lemmon	Mount Lemmon Survey	·	2.0 km	MPC · JPL
611453	2006 WH_{84}	—	October 21, 2006	Mount Lemmon	Mount Lemmon Survey	·	2.1 km	MPC · JPL
611454	2006 WZ_{85}	—	November 18, 2006	Kitt Peak	Spacewatch	·	850 m	MPC · JPL
611455	2006 WD_{89}	—	November 18, 2006	Kitt Peak	Spacewatch	NYS	1.0 km	MPC · JPL
611456	2006 WK_{93}	—	November 19, 2006	Kitt Peak	Spacewatch	NYS	770 m	MPC · JPL
611457	2006 WT_{95}	—	October 19, 2006	Mount Lemmon	Mount Lemmon Survey	KOR	1.2 km	MPC · JPL
611458	2006 WC_{105}	—	November 19, 2006	Kitt Peak	Spacewatch	KOR	1.3 km	MPC · JPL
611459	2006 WJ_{106}	—	November 19, 2006	Kitt Peak	Spacewatch	·	760 m	MPC · JPL
611460	2006 WQ_{106}	—	November 19, 2006	Kitt Peak	Spacewatch	·	1.8 km	MPC · JPL
611461	2006 WT_{109}	—	November 19, 2006	Kitt Peak	Spacewatch	KOR	1.5 km	MPC · JPL
611462	2006 WM_{110}	—	November 19, 2006	Kitt Peak	Spacewatch	KOR	1.1 km	MPC · JPL
611463	2006 WS_{119}	—	October 4, 2006	Mount Lemmon	Mount Lemmon Survey	·	2.0 km	MPC · JPL
611464	2006 WM_{123}	—	November 21, 2006	Mount Lemmon	Mount Lemmon Survey	·	2.8 km	MPC · JPL
611465	2006 WV_{125}	—	November 22, 2006	Mount Lemmon	Mount Lemmon Survey	·	910 m	MPC · JPL
611466	2006 WE_{134}	—	October 4, 2006	Mount Lemmon	Mount Lemmon Survey	·	1.0 km	MPC · JPL
611467	2006 WD_{139}	—	November 19, 2006	Kitt Peak	Spacewatch	KOR	1.4 km	MPC · JPL
611468	2006 WO_{141}	—	November 20, 2006	Kitt Peak	Spacewatch	GAL	1.5 km	MPC · JPL
611469	2006 WF_{143}	—	November 20, 2006	Kitt Peak	Spacewatch	KOR	1.4 km	MPC · JPL
611470	2006 WZ_{146}	—	November 20, 2006	Kitt Peak	Spacewatch	·	1.7 km	MPC · JPL
611471	2006 WT_{148}	—	November 20, 2006	Kitt Peak	Spacewatch	KOR	1.3 km	MPC · JPL
611472	2006 WA_{158}	—	November 22, 2006	Kitt Peak	Spacewatch	·	1.7 km	MPC · JPL
611473	2006 WH_{159}	—	November 22, 2006	Mount Lemmon	Mount Lemmon Survey	·	2.1 km	MPC · JPL
611474	2006 WV_{159}	—	January 24, 2003	La Silla	A. Boattini, Hainaut, O.	GEF	1.5 km	MPC · JPL
611475	2006 WR_{160}	—	October 15, 2002	Palomar	NEAT	·	1.2 km	MPC · JPL
611476	2006 WP_{166}	—	November 23, 2006	Kitt Peak	Spacewatch	·	1.5 km	MPC · JPL
611477	2006 WS_{167}	—	November 23, 2006	Kitt Peak	Spacewatch	·	1.5 km	MPC · JPL
611478	2006 WU_{167}	—	November 23, 2006	Kitt Peak	Spacewatch	·	1.5 km	MPC · JPL
611479	2006 WL_{169}	—	November 23, 2006	Kitt Peak	Spacewatch	KOR	1.4 km	MPC · JPL
611480	2006 WO_{170}	—	November 23, 2006	Kitt Peak	Spacewatch	MAS	590 m	MPC · JPL
611481	2006 WH_{172}	—	November 23, 2006	Kitt Peak	Spacewatch	·	1.2 km	MPC · JPL
611482	2006 WH_{175}	—	February 8, 2000	Kitt Peak	Spacewatch	·	730 m	MPC · JPL
611483	2006 WF_{177}	—	September 27, 2006	Mount Lemmon	Mount Lemmon Survey	·	950 m	MPC · JPL
611484	2006 WX_{181}	—	May 20, 2005	Mount Lemmon	Mount Lemmon Survey	MAS	750 m	MPC · JPL
611485	2006 WO_{188}	—	October 31, 2006	Mount Lemmon	Mount Lemmon Survey	KOR	1.2 km	MPC · JPL
611486	2006 WJ_{196}	—	November 24, 2006	Kitt Peak	J. W. Parker, A. Bieryla	CLA	1.7 km	MPC · JPL
611487	2006 WF_{200}	—	November 19, 2006	Kitt Peak	Spacewatch	·	1.7 km	MPC · JPL
611488	2006 WK_{203}	—	March 10, 2003	Kitt Peak	Spacewatch	KOR	1.3 km	MPC · JPL
611489	2006 WA_{208}	—	November 17, 2006	Kitt Peak	Spacewatch	·	1.2 km	MPC · JPL
611490	2006 WX_{208}	—	November 18, 2006	Mount Lemmon	Mount Lemmon Survey	·	970 m	MPC · JPL
611491	2006 WH_{211}	—	September 11, 2015	Haleakala	Pan-STARRS 1	·	1.6 km	MPC · JPL
611492	2006 WG_{212}	—	November 19, 2006	Kitt Peak	Spacewatch	·	730 m	MPC · JPL
611493	2006 WH_{212}	—	March 1, 2008	Kitt Peak	Spacewatch	·	1.0 km	MPC · JPL
611494 Gionti	2006 WV_{212}	Gionti	May 18, 2014	Mount Graham	K. Černis, R. P. Boyle	·	1.6 km	MPC · JPL
611495	2006 WV_{213}	—	November 20, 2006	Kitt Peak	Spacewatch	·	1.9 km	MPC · JPL
611496	2006 WA_{214}	—	July 14, 2013	Haleakala	Pan-STARRS 1	·	870 m	MPC · JPL
611497	2006 WR_{214}	—	January 23, 2015	Haleakala	Pan-STARRS 1	V	520 m	MPC · JPL
611498	2006 WN_{217}	—	October 23, 2013	Mount Lemmon	Mount Lemmon Survey	V	550 m	MPC · JPL
611499	2006 WM_{218}	—	February 3, 2008	Mount Lemmon	Mount Lemmon Survey	·	2.0 km	MPC · JPL
611500	2006 WD_{220}	—	September 15, 2010	Mount Lemmon	Mount Lemmon Survey	·	1.1 km	MPC · JPL

== 611501–611600 ==
back to top

Designation			Discovery			Properties		Ref
Permanent	Provisional	Named after	Date	Site	Discoverer(s)	Category	Diam.	Ref
611501	2006 WM_{220}	—	November 10, 2016	Haleakala	Pan-STARRS 1	BRA	1.4 km	MPC · JPL
611502	2006 WJ_{223}	—	July 1, 2014	Haleakala	Pan-STARRS 1	·	1.4 km	MPC · JPL
611503	2006 WW_{223}	—	November 16, 2006	Kitt Peak	Spacewatch	MAS	450 m	MPC · JPL
611504	2006 WG_{224}	—	May 7, 2014	Haleakala	Pan-STARRS 1	·	1.8 km	MPC · JPL
611505	2006 WU_{224}	—	February 13, 2013	ESA OGS	ESA OGS	·	1.7 km	MPC · JPL
611506	2006 WV_{224}	—	November 17, 2006	Mount Lemmon	Mount Lemmon Survey	·	1.4 km	MPC · JPL
611507	2006 WN_{229}	—	November 19, 2006	Kitt Peak	Spacewatch	MAS	500 m	MPC · JPL
611508	2006 WV_{230}	—	November 19, 2006	Kitt Peak	Spacewatch	NYS	700 m	MPC · JPL
611509	2006 WL_{231}	—	November 17, 2006	Kitt Peak	Spacewatch	·	1.3 km	MPC · JPL
611510	2006 WM_{231}	—	November 16, 2006	Mount Lemmon	Mount Lemmon Survey	·	2.9 km	MPC · JPL
611511	2006 WC_{232}	—	November 18, 2006	Mount Lemmon	Mount Lemmon Survey	·	2.8 km	MPC · JPL
611512	2006 WF_{232}	—	November 18, 2006	Mount Lemmon	Mount Lemmon Survey	EOS	1.7 km	MPC · JPL
611513	2006 WG_{232}	—	November 16, 2006	Mount Lemmon	Mount Lemmon Survey	BRA	1.2 km	MPC · JPL
611514	2006 WH_{232}	—	November 16, 2006	Kitt Peak	Spacewatch	·	1.7 km	MPC · JPL
611515	2006 WU_{232}	—	November 22, 2006	Kitt Peak	Spacewatch	BRA	1.0 km	MPC · JPL
611516	2006 XH	—	December 9, 2006	Socorro	LINEAR	·	1.6 km	MPC · JPL
611517	2006 XG_{3}	—	December 12, 2006	Kitt Peak	Spacewatch	·	1.0 km	MPC · JPL
611518	2006 XY_{4}	—	November 18, 2006	Kitt Peak	Spacewatch	·	1.7 km	MPC · JPL
611519	2006 XK_{9}	—	December 9, 2006	Kitt Peak	Spacewatch	·	1.1 km	MPC · JPL
611520	2006 XP_{10}	—	December 9, 2006	Kitt Peak	Spacewatch	·	1.0 km	MPC · JPL
611521	2006 XM_{21}	—	November 25, 2006	Kitt Peak	Spacewatch	MAS	600 m	MPC · JPL
611522	2006 XR_{22}	—	December 12, 2006	Kitt Peak	Spacewatch	·	830 m	MPC · JPL
611523	2006 XU_{43}	—	November 25, 2006	Mount Lemmon	Mount Lemmon Survey	·	1.9 km	MPC · JPL
611524	2006 XB_{45}	—	December 13, 2006	Kitt Peak	Spacewatch	·	950 m	MPC · JPL
611525	2006 XG_{46}	—	November 19, 2006	Kitt Peak	Spacewatch	KOR	1.4 km	MPC · JPL
611526	2006 XH_{65}	—	December 13, 2006	Catalina	CSS	·	2.5 km	MPC · JPL
611527	2006 XH_{74}	—	December 13, 2006	Kitt Peak	Spacewatch	·	1.5 km	MPC · JPL
611528	2006 XN_{74}	—	December 13, 2006	Mount Lemmon	Mount Lemmon Survey	MAS	600 m	MPC · JPL
611529	2006 XU_{75}	—	March 6, 2011	Kitt Peak	Spacewatch	·	1.2 km	MPC · JPL
611530	2006 XA_{76}	—	December 13, 2006	Mount Lemmon	Mount Lemmon Survey	·	2.4 km	MPC · JPL
611531	2006 XE_{76}	—	January 3, 2012	Mount Lemmon	Mount Lemmon Survey	·	2.7 km	MPC · JPL
611532	2006 XJ_{76}	—	November 25, 2011	Haleakala	Pan-STARRS 1	·	1.3 km	MPC · JPL
611533	2006 XB_{77}	—	January 3, 2011	Mount Lemmon	Mount Lemmon Survey	·	1.0 km	MPC · JPL
611534	2006 XK_{77}	—	December 13, 2006	Kitt Peak	Spacewatch	EOS	1.5 km	MPC · JPL
611535	2006 XV_{77}	—	January 16, 2011	Mount Lemmon	Mount Lemmon Survey	·	1.0 km	MPC · JPL
611536	2006 XZ_{78}	—	July 23, 2015	Haleakala	Pan-STARRS 2	·	1.5 km	MPC · JPL
611537	2006 XF_{79}	—	January 30, 2011	Kitt Peak	Spacewatch	NYS	870 m	MPC · JPL
611538	2006 XM_{80}	—	December 13, 2006	Mount Lemmon	Mount Lemmon Survey	·	1.5 km	MPC · JPL
611539	2006 XC_{81}	—	December 13, 2006	Kitt Peak	Spacewatch	·	1.5 km	MPC · JPL
611540	2006 XH_{81}	—	December 15, 2006	Kitt Peak	Spacewatch	·	1.8 km	MPC · JPL
611541	2006 XJ_{81}	—	December 15, 2006	Kitt Peak	Spacewatch	EOS	1.4 km	MPC · JPL
611542	2006 XV_{81}	—	December 1, 2006	Mount Lemmon	Mount Lemmon Survey	KOR	1.1 km	MPC · JPL
611543	2006 YY	—	March 18, 2004	Kitt Peak	Spacewatch	·	1.2 km	MPC · JPL
611544	2006 YM_{2}	—	December 16, 2006	Pla D'Arguines	R. Ferrando, Ferrando, M.	V	690 m	MPC · JPL
611545	2006 YL_{6}	—	August 6, 2005	Palomar	NEAT	·	1.5 km	MPC · JPL
611546	2006 YS_{10}	—	December 21, 2006	Mount Lemmon	Mount Lemmon Survey	·	1.1 km	MPC · JPL
611547	2006 YJ_{13}	—	December 22, 2006	Gaisberg	Gierlinger, R.	MAS	530 m	MPC · JPL
611548	2006 YY_{20}	—	December 21, 2006	Kitt Peak	Spacewatch	KOR	1.3 km	MPC · JPL
611549	2006 YZ_{21}	—	December 21, 2006	Kitt Peak	Spacewatch	·	1.4 km	MPC · JPL
611550	2006 YE_{27}	—	November 27, 2006	Mount Lemmon	Mount Lemmon Survey	V	510 m	MPC · JPL
611551	2006 YQ_{27}	—	December 21, 2006	Kitt Peak	Spacewatch	KOR	1.2 km	MPC · JPL
611552	2006 YC_{28}	—	December 21, 2006	Kitt Peak	Spacewatch	V	560 m	MPC · JPL
611553	2006 YV_{30}	—	December 21, 2006	Kitt Peak	Spacewatch	·	2.1 km	MPC · JPL
611554	2006 YL_{31}	—	December 21, 2006	Kitt Peak	Spacewatch	EOS	1.4 km	MPC · JPL
611555	2006 YZ_{32}	—	December 21, 2006	Kitt Peak	Spacewatch	·	1.3 km	MPC · JPL
611556	2006 YL_{33}	—	June 11, 2004	Kitt Peak	Spacewatch	·	1.4 km	MPC · JPL
611557	2006 YF_{37}	—	October 10, 2005	Catalina	CSS	·	2.7 km	MPC · JPL
611558	2006 YJ_{44}	—	December 21, 2006	Kitt Peak	Spacewatch	·	1.7 km	MPC · JPL
611559	2006 YY_{49}	—	December 27, 2006	Mount Lemmon	Mount Lemmon Survey	AGN	740 m	MPC · JPL
611560	2006 YZ_{57}	—	August 2, 2009	Siding Spring	SSS	·	1.1 km	MPC · JPL
611561	2006 YL_{58}	—	January 17, 2015	Haleakala	Pan-STARRS 1	PHO	850 m	MPC · JPL
611562	2006 YV_{59}	—	May 25, 2010	WISE	WISE	·	3.5 km	MPC · JPL
611563	2006 YY_{60}	—	December 21, 2006	Kitt Peak	Spacewatch	·	1.6 km	MPC · JPL
611564	2006 YG_{62}	—	March 8, 2008	Mount Lemmon	Mount Lemmon Survey	·	1.5 km	MPC · JPL
611565	2006 YS_{62}	—	December 24, 2006	Kitt Peak	Spacewatch	EOS	1.4 km	MPC · JPL
611566	2006 YO_{63}	—	December 15, 2017	Mount Lemmon	Mount Lemmon Survey	·	980 m	MPC · JPL
611567	2006 YF_{64}	—	February 8, 2011	Mount Lemmon	Mount Lemmon Survey	·	1.0 km	MPC · JPL
611568	2006 YS_{64}	—	May 7, 2014	Haleakala	Pan-STARRS 1	·	1.8 km	MPC · JPL
611569	2006 YC_{66}	—	September 2, 2010	Mount Lemmon	Mount Lemmon Survey	·	2.1 km	MPC · JPL
611570	2006 YL_{66}	—	January 12, 2011	Mount Lemmon	Mount Lemmon Survey	·	730 m	MPC · JPL
611571	2006 YB_{68}	—	December 24, 2006	Kitt Peak	Spacewatch	·	1.9 km	MPC · JPL
611572	2006 YX_{68}	—	December 26, 2006	Kitt Peak	Spacewatch	·	1.5 km	MPC · JPL
611573	2006 YK_{69}	—	December 26, 2006	Kitt Peak	Spacewatch	·	1.2 km	MPC · JPL
611574	2007 AY_{2}	—	August 5, 2005	Palomar	NEAT	·	2.7 km	MPC · JPL
611575	2007 AB_{5}	—	January 8, 2007	Mount Lemmon	Mount Lemmon Survey	PHO	680 m	MPC · JPL
611576	2007 AS_{7}	—	January 9, 2007	Mount Lemmon	Mount Lemmon Survey	NYS	1.2 km	MPC · JPL
611577	2007 AM_{33}	—	April 1, 2008	Kitt Peak	Spacewatch	·	840 m	MPC · JPL
611578	2007 AD_{34}	—	January 10, 2007	Mount Lemmon	Mount Lemmon Survey	NYS	730 m	MPC · JPL
611579	2007 AD_{36}	—	January 10, 2007	Mount Lemmon	Mount Lemmon Survey	EOS	1.5 km	MPC · JPL
611580	2007 BE_{9}	—	January 17, 2007	Catalina	CSS	·	1.8 km	MPC · JPL
611581	2007 BP_{9}	—	January 17, 2007	Kitt Peak	Spacewatch	·	2.4 km	MPC · JPL
611582	2007 BG_{28}	—	December 21, 2006	Mount Lemmon	Mount Lemmon Survey	·	1.8 km	MPC · JPL
611583	2007 BU_{28}	—	April 1, 2003	Apache Point	SDSS	EOS	1.7 km	MPC · JPL
611584	2007 BO_{29}	—	January 24, 2007	Mount Lemmon	Mount Lemmon Survey	·	930 m	MPC · JPL
611585 Bergbusch	2007 BA_{31}	Bergbusch	January 20, 2007	Mauna Kea	D. D. Balam, K. M. Perrett	·	2.4 km	MPC · JPL
611586 Tsartlip	2007 BJ_{31}	Tsartlip	January 23, 2007	Mauna Kea	D. D. Balam, K. M. Perrett	·	2.5 km	MPC · JPL
611587 Tseycum	2007 BK_{31}	Tseycum	January 23, 2007	Mauna Kea	D. D. Balam, K. M. Perrett	·	2.5 km	MPC · JPL
611588	2007 BV_{50}	—	January 24, 2007	Mount Lemmon	Mount Lemmon Survey	·	1.7 km	MPC · JPL
611589	2007 BT_{51}	—	January 24, 2007	Kitt Peak	Spacewatch	EOS	1.7 km	MPC · JPL
611590	2007 BU_{51}	—	January 24, 2007	Kitt Peak	Spacewatch	·	880 m	MPC · JPL
611591	2007 BL_{52}	—	January 24, 2007	Kitt Peak	Spacewatch	·	920 m	MPC · JPL
611592	2007 BK_{54}	—	January 17, 2007	Kitt Peak	Spacewatch	MAS	490 m	MPC · JPL
611593	2007 BN_{54}	—	December 21, 2006	Kitt Peak	L. H. Wasserman, M. W. Buie	·	930 m	MPC · JPL
611594	2007 BU_{55}	—	January 24, 2007	Socorro	LINEAR	·	1.1 km	MPC · JPL
611595	2007 BO_{62}	—	January 27, 2007	Mount Lemmon	Mount Lemmon Survey	·	2.0 km	MPC · JPL
611596	2007 BX_{68}	—	January 27, 2007	Mount Lemmon	Mount Lemmon Survey	·	870 m	MPC · JPL
611597	2007 BY_{78}	—	January 27, 2007	Mount Lemmon	Mount Lemmon Survey	·	760 m	MPC · JPL
611598	2007 BO_{84}	—	January 19, 2007	Mauna Kea	P. A. Wiegert	·	1.5 km	MPC · JPL
611599	2007 BT_{84}	—	February 8, 2007	Mount Lemmon	Mount Lemmon Survey	·	1.3 km	MPC · JPL
611600	2007 BX_{89}	—	December 27, 2006	Mount Lemmon	Mount Lemmon Survey	·	1.6 km	MPC · JPL

== 611601–611700 ==
back to top

Designation			Discovery			Properties		Ref
Permanent	Provisional	Named after	Date	Site	Discoverer(s)	Category	Diam.	Ref
611601	2007 BP_{93}	—	March 29, 2008	Kitt Peak	Spacewatch	·	1.8 km	MPC · JPL
611602	2007 BW_{103}	—	January 27, 2007	Mount Lemmon	Mount Lemmon Survey	V	650 m	MPC · JPL
611603	2007 BZ_{103}	—	July 7, 2005	Mauna Kea	Veillet, C.	MAS	640 m	MPC · JPL
611604	2007 BB_{104}	—	January 17, 2007	Kitt Peak	Spacewatch	·	1.4 km	MPC · JPL
611605	2007 BK_{104}	—	January 27, 2007	Kitt Peak	Spacewatch	MAS	560 m	MPC · JPL
611606	2007 BY_{104}	—	August 21, 2015	Haleakala	Pan-STARRS 1	EOS	1.6 km	MPC · JPL
611607	2007 BL_{106}	—	March 30, 2011	Haleakala	Pan-STARRS 1	·	1.3 km	MPC · JPL
611608	2007 BW_{106}	—	October 2, 2015	Mount Lemmon	Mount Lemmon Survey	EOS	1.6 km	MPC · JPL
611609	2007 BA_{108}	—	January 26, 2007	Kitt Peak	Spacewatch	·	1.4 km	MPC · JPL
611610	2007 BL_{108}	—	June 4, 2014	Haleakala	Pan-STARRS 1	·	2.5 km	MPC · JPL
611611	2007 BY_{109}	—	January 10, 2007	Kitt Peak	Spacewatch	H	420 m	MPC · JPL
611612	2007 BN_{110}	—	January 14, 2018	Haleakala	Pan-STARRS 1	·	1.9 km	MPC · JPL
611613	2007 BF_{113}	—	January 28, 2007	Mount Lemmon	Mount Lemmon Survey	·	1.2 km	MPC · JPL
611614	2007 BM_{113}	—	October 3, 2013	Haleakala	Pan-STARRS 1	NYS	800 m	MPC · JPL
611615	2007 BV_{115}	—	January 28, 2007	Mount Lemmon	Mount Lemmon Survey	·	2.5 km	MPC · JPL
611616	2007 BY_{115}	—	January 17, 2007	Kitt Peak	Spacewatch	·	1.8 km	MPC · JPL
611617	2007 BG_{116}	—	January 27, 2007	Kitt Peak	Spacewatch	·	1.4 km	MPC · JPL
611618	2007 BY_{116}	—	January 17, 2007	Kitt Peak	Spacewatch	EOS	1.6 km	MPC · JPL
611619	2007 BL_{117}	—	November 17, 1998	Kitt Peak	Spacewatch	·	970 m	MPC · JPL
611620	2007 BB_{118}	—	January 28, 2007	Kitt Peak	Spacewatch	·	1.4 km	MPC · JPL
611621	2007 CN_{2}	—	February 6, 2007	Kitt Peak	Spacewatch	EOS	2.2 km	MPC · JPL
611622	2007 CG_{4}	—	January 28, 2007	Kitt Peak	Spacewatch	·	1.5 km	MPC · JPL
611623	2007 CF_{6}	—	February 6, 2007	Kitt Peak	Spacewatch	·	920 m	MPC · JPL
611624	2007 CX_{23}	—	October 23, 2006	Mount Lemmon	Mount Lemmon Survey	·	1.3 km	MPC · JPL
611625	2007 CE_{30}	—	February 6, 2007	Mount Lemmon	Mount Lemmon Survey	·	1.7 km	MPC · JPL
611626	2007 CE_{48}	—	February 10, 2007	Mount Lemmon	Mount Lemmon Survey	·	1.1 km	MPC · JPL
611627	2007 CN_{49}	—	September 30, 2005	Palomar	NEAT	·	1.7 km	MPC · JPL
611628	2007 CR_{49}	—	November 12, 2005	Kitt Peak	Spacewatch	3:2	3.8 km	MPC · JPL
611629	2007 CE_{51}	—	February 10, 2007	Mount Lemmon	Mount Lemmon Survey	EOS	1.6 km	MPC · JPL
611630	2007 CZ_{57}	—	February 9, 2007	Catalina	CSS	·	2.3 km	MPC · JPL
611631	2007 CD_{64}	—	January 28, 2007	Mount Lemmon	Mount Lemmon Survey	·	850 m	MPC · JPL
611632	2007 CK_{65}	—	January 27, 2007	Kitt Peak	Spacewatch	T_{j} (2.99) · 3:2	3.7 km	MPC · JPL
611633	2007 CU_{66}	—	January 28, 2007	Kitt Peak	Spacewatch	·	1.4 km	MPC · JPL
611634	2007 CD_{68}	—	August 8, 2005	Cerro Tololo	Deep Ecliptic Survey	·	850 m	MPC · JPL
611635	2007 CH_{71}	—	February 16, 2007	Mount Lemmon	Mount Lemmon Survey	·	1.3 km	MPC · JPL
611636	2007 CP_{74}	—	February 14, 2007	Mauna Kea	P. A. Wiegert	·	2.1 km	MPC · JPL
611637	2007 CN_{77}	—	February 14, 2007	Mauna Kea	P. A. Wiegert	·	1.8 km	MPC · JPL
611638	2007 CD_{81}	—	March 28, 2011	Kitt Peak	Spacewatch	·	740 m	MPC · JPL
611639	2007 CH_{81}	—	February 7, 2007	Palomar	NEAT	PHO	920 m	MPC · JPL
611640	2007 CW_{81}	—	September 11, 2010	Kitt Peak	Spacewatch	·	1.5 km	MPC · JPL
611641	2007 CF_{82}	—	November 12, 2010	Kitt Peak	Spacewatch	·	1.7 km	MPC · JPL
611642	2007 CN_{82}	—	March 6, 2013	Haleakala	Pan-STARRS 1	·	2.1 km	MPC · JPL
611643	2007 CS_{82}	—	July 1, 2014	Haleakala	Pan-STARRS 1	·	1.6 km	MPC · JPL
611644	2007 CU_{82}	—	February 8, 2007	Mount Lemmon	Mount Lemmon Survey	·	900 m	MPC · JPL
611645	2007 CD_{83}	—	July 1, 2014	Haleakala	Pan-STARRS 1	·	2.2 km	MPC · JPL
611646	2007 CN_{84}	—	February 13, 2007	Mount Lemmon	Mount Lemmon Survey	·	2.0 km	MPC · JPL
611647	2007 CQ_{84}	—	February 6, 2007	Kitt Peak	Spacewatch	·	2.5 km	MPC · JPL
611648	2007 DO	—	February 16, 2007	Cordell-Lorenz	Cordell-Lorenz	·	2.1 km	MPC · JPL
611649	2007 DN_{3}	—	February 16, 2007	Mount Lemmon	Mount Lemmon Survey	·	3.7 km	MPC · JPL
611650	2007 DF_{10}	—	February 9, 2007	Kitt Peak	Spacewatch	·	2.0 km	MPC · JPL
611651	2007 DV_{10}	—	February 17, 2007	Kitt Peak	Spacewatch	T_{j} (2.97) · 3:2	4.3 km	MPC · JPL
611652	2007 DM_{14}	—	February 8, 2007	Kitt Peak	Spacewatch	·	1.5 km	MPC · JPL
611653	2007 DU_{20}	—	January 28, 2007	Mount Lemmon	Mount Lemmon Survey	MAS	610 m	MPC · JPL
611654	2007 DF_{36}	—	February 17, 2007	Mount Lemmon	Mount Lemmon Survey	·	1.6 km	MPC · JPL
611655	2007 DC_{39}	—	February 17, 2007	Kitt Peak	Spacewatch	·	2.7 km	MPC · JPL
611656	2007 DJ_{45}	—	February 19, 2007	Mount Lemmon	Mount Lemmon Survey	·	2.0 km	MPC · JPL
611657	2007 DK_{45}	—	October 14, 2001	Apache Point	SDSS Collaboration	·	1.4 km	MPC · JPL
611658	2007 DO_{46}	—	February 21, 2007	Eskridge	G. Hug	EOS	1.7 km	MPC · JPL
611659	2007 DY_{50}	—	February 17, 2007	Kitt Peak	Spacewatch	·	2.4 km	MPC · JPL
611660	2007 DX_{55}	—	February 21, 2007	Kitt Peak	Spacewatch	·	2.3 km	MPC · JPL
611661	2007 DJ_{59}	—	February 22, 2007	Kitt Peak	Spacewatch	HYG	2.3 km	MPC · JPL
611662	2007 DJ_{62}	—	February 21, 2007	Kitt Peak	Spacewatch	·	1.3 km	MPC · JPL
611663	2007 DQ_{75}	—	February 21, 2007	Kitt Peak	Spacewatch	·	1.1 km	MPC · JPL
611664	2007 DZ_{80}	—	February 23, 2007	Mount Lemmon	Mount Lemmon Survey	EOS	1.6 km	MPC · JPL
611665	2007 DB_{82}	—	February 21, 2007	Mount Lemmon	Mount Lemmon Survey	·	2.1 km	MPC · JPL
611666	2007 DV_{99}	—	March 20, 2002	Kitt Peak	Spacewatch	·	1.8 km	MPC · JPL
611667	2007 DY_{102}	—	January 27, 2007	Mount Lemmon	Mount Lemmon Survey	·	1.0 km	MPC · JPL
611668	2007 DX_{113}	—	February 23, 2007	Mount Lemmon	Mount Lemmon Survey	·	1.4 km	MPC · JPL
611669	2007 DU_{115}	—	February 21, 2007	Mount Lemmon	Mount Lemmon Survey	·	2.0 km	MPC · JPL
611670	2007 DA_{117}	—	February 23, 2007	Catalina	CSS	PHO	990 m	MPC · JPL
611671	2007 DF_{119}	—	February 21, 2007	Mount Lemmon	Mount Lemmon Survey	·	1.9 km	MPC · JPL
611672	2007 DW_{119}	—	February 23, 2007	Kitt Peak	Spacewatch	·	3.2 km	MPC · JPL
611673	2007 DG_{121}	—	February 21, 2007	Kitt Peak	Spacewatch	·	1.3 km	MPC · JPL
611674	2007 DP_{123}	—	February 23, 2007	Kitt Peak	Spacewatch	HYG	2.5 km	MPC · JPL
611675	2007 DA_{125}	—	January 15, 2015	Haleakala	Pan-STARRS 1	·	1.8 km	MPC · JPL
611676	2007 DB_{125}	—	February 25, 2007	Kitt Peak	Spacewatch	EOS	1.4 km	MPC · JPL
611677	2007 DW_{125}	—	January 15, 2018	Haleakala	Pan-STARRS 1	·	2.4 km	MPC · JPL
611678	2007 DY_{125}	—	February 23, 2007	Mount Lemmon	Mount Lemmon Survey	·	1.1 km	MPC · JPL
611679	2007 DQ_{126}	—	March 1, 2011	Mount Lemmon	Mount Lemmon Survey	·	850 m	MPC · JPL
611680	2007 DV_{128}	—	February 25, 2007	Mount Lemmon	Mount Lemmon Survey	·	2.7 km	MPC · JPL
611681	2007 DX_{128}	—	February 21, 2007	Kitt Peak	Spacewatch	·	2.3 km	MPC · JPL
611682	2007 DV_{129}	—	February 23, 2007	Kitt Peak	Spacewatch	EOS	1.5 km	MPC · JPL
611683	2007 DZ_{129}	—	February 21, 2007	Mount Lemmon	Mount Lemmon Survey	·	2.1 km	MPC · JPL
611684	2007 DD_{130}	—	February 23, 2007	Kitt Peak	Spacewatch	·	950 m	MPC · JPL
611685	2007 EX_{7}	—	March 9, 2007	Mount Lemmon	Mount Lemmon Survey	·	1.6 km	MPC · JPL
611686	2007 EG_{33}	—	March 10, 2007	Mount Lemmon	Mount Lemmon Survey	·	2.5 km	MPC · JPL
611687	2007 EC_{37}	—	March 11, 2007	Mount Lemmon	Mount Lemmon Survey	·	2.7 km	MPC · JPL
611688	2007 EE_{37}	—	March 11, 2007	Mount Lemmon	Mount Lemmon Survey	·	2.0 km	MPC · JPL
611689	2007 EL_{38}	—	March 11, 2007	Kitt Peak	Spacewatch	·	1.0 km	MPC · JPL
611690	2007 EU_{38}	—	March 11, 2007	Kitt Peak	Spacewatch	·	2.2 km	MPC · JPL
611691	2007 EF_{50}	—	March 10, 2007	Mount Lemmon	Mount Lemmon Survey	EMA	2.6 km	MPC · JPL
611692	2007 ER_{50}	—	March 10, 2007	Mount Lemmon	Mount Lemmon Survey	·	810 m	MPC · JPL
611693	2007 EW_{50}	—	March 10, 2007	Mount Lemmon	Mount Lemmon Survey	·	1.7 km	MPC · JPL
611694	2007 EF_{55}	—	March 12, 2007	Mount Lemmon	Mount Lemmon Survey	·	1.6 km	MPC · JPL
611695	2007 EJ_{56}	—	March 12, 2007	Kitt Peak	Spacewatch	EOS	1.9 km	MPC · JPL
611696	2007 EN_{56}	—	March 11, 1996	Kitt Peak	Spacewatch	EOS	1.6 km	MPC · JPL
611697	2007 EO_{59}	—	February 21, 2007	Mount Lemmon	Mount Lemmon Survey	NYS	770 m	MPC · JPL
611698	2007 ET_{60}	—	March 10, 2007	Kitt Peak	Spacewatch	·	1.1 km	MPC · JPL
611699	2007 EK_{66}	—	March 10, 2007	Kitt Peak	Spacewatch	·	1.7 km	MPC · JPL
611700	2007 EM_{66}	—	March 10, 2007	Kitt Peak	Spacewatch	·	2.2 km	MPC · JPL

== 611701–611800 ==
back to top

Designation			Discovery			Properties		Ref
Permanent	Provisional	Named after	Date	Site	Discoverer(s)	Category	Diam.	Ref
611701	2007 ES_{68}	—	March 10, 2007	Kitt Peak	Spacewatch	·	790 m	MPC · JPL
611702	2007 EZ_{71}	—	February 26, 2007	Mount Lemmon	Mount Lemmon Survey	·	3.0 km	MPC · JPL
611703	2007 EN_{72}	—	March 10, 2007	Mount Lemmon	Mount Lemmon Survey	·	3.1 km	MPC · JPL
611704	2007 EP_{74}	—	March 10, 2007	Kitt Peak	Spacewatch	·	910 m	MPC · JPL
611705	2007 EB_{75}	—	March 10, 2007	Mount Lemmon	Mount Lemmon Survey	HYG	2.5 km	MPC · JPL
611706	2007 EU_{75}	—	March 10, 2007	Kitt Peak	Spacewatch	MAS	730 m	MPC · JPL
611707	2007 EB_{78}	—	March 10, 2007	Mount Lemmon	Mount Lemmon Survey	HYG	2.0 km	MPC · JPL
611708	2007 EC_{78}	—	November 4, 2004	Kitt Peak	Spacewatch	·	3.3 km	MPC · JPL
611709	2007 EQ_{86}	—	October 21, 2001	Kitt Peak	Spacewatch	·	1.2 km	MPC · JPL
611710	2007 EU_{96}	—	March 10, 2007	Mount Lemmon	Mount Lemmon Survey	·	1.3 km	MPC · JPL
611711	2007 ES_{97}	—	March 11, 2007	Kitt Peak	Spacewatch	3:2	4.1 km	MPC · JPL
611712	2007 EG_{110}	—	March 10, 2003	Palomar	NEAT	NYS	1.2 km	MPC · JPL
611713	2007 EF_{113}	—	February 23, 2007	Kitt Peak	Spacewatch	·	1.4 km	MPC · JPL
611714	2007 ED_{118}	—	March 13, 2007	Mount Lemmon	Mount Lemmon Survey	·	2.9 km	MPC · JPL
611715	2007 ED_{122}	—	March 14, 2007	Mount Lemmon	Mount Lemmon Survey	EOS	1.5 km	MPC · JPL
611716	2007 EL_{122}	—	March 14, 2007	Mount Lemmon	Mount Lemmon Survey	EOS	1.4 km	MPC · JPL
611717	2007 EH_{124}	—	March 14, 2007	Mount Lemmon	Mount Lemmon Survey	·	1.4 km	MPC · JPL
611718	2007 EV_{125}	—	March 11, 2007	Kitt Peak	Spacewatch	·	1.5 km	MPC · JPL
611719	2007 EV_{126}	—	February 23, 2007	Mount Lemmon	Mount Lemmon Survey	·	2.1 km	MPC · JPL
611720	2007 EO_{133}	—	March 9, 2007	Mount Lemmon	Mount Lemmon Survey	·	740 m	MPC · JPL
611721	2007 EF_{140}	—	March 12, 2007	Mount Lemmon	Mount Lemmon Survey	·	2.0 km	MPC · JPL
611722	2007 ED_{143}	—	March 12, 2007	Kitt Peak	Spacewatch	·	3.0 km	MPC · JPL
611723	2007 EK_{143}	—	March 12, 2007	Kitt Peak	Spacewatch	V	730 m	MPC · JPL
611724	2007 ET_{147}	—	March 12, 2007	Mount Lemmon	Mount Lemmon Survey	·	2.1 km	MPC · JPL
611725	2007 EV_{148}	—	March 12, 2007	Mount Lemmon	Mount Lemmon Survey	·	1.1 km	MPC · JPL
611726	2007 EE_{149}	—	September 22, 2004	Kitt Peak	Spacewatch	·	3.1 km	MPC · JPL
611727	2007 ET_{152}	—	March 12, 2007	Mount Lemmon	Mount Lemmon Survey	·	1.6 km	MPC · JPL
611728	2007 EA_{155}	—	March 12, 2007	Kitt Peak	Spacewatch	·	3.0 km	MPC · JPL
611729	2007 EH_{156}	—	March 12, 2007	Kitt Peak	Spacewatch	·	1.1 km	MPC · JPL
611730	2007 EW_{158}	—	March 14, 2007	Mount Lemmon	Mount Lemmon Survey	·	2.3 km	MPC · JPL
611731	2007 ET_{159}	—	March 14, 2007	Mount Lemmon	Mount Lemmon Survey	·	1.2 km	MPC · JPL
611732	2007 EK_{163}	—	March 15, 2007	Mount Lemmon	Mount Lemmon Survey	·	1.4 km	MPC · JPL
611733	2007 EL_{163}	—	March 15, 2007	Mount Lemmon	Mount Lemmon Survey	VER	2.3 km	MPC · JPL
611734	2007 EO_{163}	—	March 15, 2007	Mount Lemmon	Mount Lemmon Survey	·	2.3 km	MPC · JPL
611735	2007 ER_{163}	—	March 9, 2007	Catalina	CSS	·	2.0 km	MPC · JPL
611736	2007 EU_{164}	—	March 15, 2007	Kitt Peak	Spacewatch	·	2.3 km	MPC · JPL
611737	2007 EX_{171}	—	March 14, 2007	Kitt Peak	Spacewatch	·	1.9 km	MPC · JPL
611738	2007 EY_{171}	—	March 14, 2007	Kitt Peak	Spacewatch	·	910 m	MPC · JPL
611739	2007 EE_{172}	—	March 14, 2007	Kitt Peak	Spacewatch	·	2.5 km	MPC · JPL
611740	2007 ET_{174}	—	March 14, 2007	Kitt Peak	Spacewatch	EOS	1.6 km	MPC · JPL
611741	2007 EU_{176}	—	March 14, 2007	Kitt Peak	Spacewatch	·	1.2 km	MPC · JPL
611742	2007 EN_{177}	—	April 25, 2003	Kitt Peak	Spacewatch	·	1.1 km	MPC · JPL
611743	2007 EQ_{178}	—	March 14, 2007	Kitt Peak	Spacewatch	·	1.1 km	MPC · JPL
611744	2007 EH_{181}	—	March 14, 2007	Kitt Peak	Spacewatch	·	2.5 km	MPC · JPL
611745	2007 EK_{182}	—	March 14, 2007	Kitt Peak	Spacewatch	·	2.2 km	MPC · JPL
611746	2007 ES_{183}	—	February 17, 2007	Kitt Peak	Spacewatch	·	2.6 km	MPC · JPL
611747	2007 EK_{185}	—	March 14, 2007	Mount Lemmon	Mount Lemmon Survey	·	2.5 km	MPC · JPL
611748	2007 EQ_{192}	—	March 14, 2007	Catalina	CSS	PHO	1.2 km	MPC · JPL
611749	2007 EP_{193}	—	March 14, 2007	Catalina	CSS	·	3.9 km	MPC · JPL
611750	2007 EF_{194}	—	February 27, 2007	Kitt Peak	Spacewatch	·	1.8 km	MPC · JPL
611751	2007 EN_{202}	—	March 9, 2007	Mount Lemmon	Mount Lemmon Survey	EOS	1.7 km	MPC · JPL
611752	2007 ED_{209}	—	March 14, 2007	Kitt Peak	Spacewatch	·	870 m	MPC · JPL
611753	2007 EK_{209}	—	March 15, 2007	Kitt Peak	Spacewatch	·	1.5 km	MPC · JPL
611754	2007 EV_{220}	—	March 12, 2007	Mount Lemmon	Mount Lemmon Survey	·	1.5 km	MPC · JPL
611755	2007 EY_{223}	—	March 13, 2007	Kitt Peak	Spacewatch	·	1.6 km	MPC · JPL
611756	2007 ES_{224}	—	March 13, 2007	Kitt Peak	Spacewatch	·	2.3 km	MPC · JPL
611757	2007 EU_{225}	—	November 12, 2005	Kitt Peak	Spacewatch	3:2	3.1 km	MPC · JPL
611758	2007 EX_{225}	—	March 10, 2007	Mount Lemmon	Mount Lemmon Survey	·	1.8 km	MPC · JPL
611759	2007 EJ_{226}	—	March 12, 2007	Kitt Peak	Spacewatch	·	1.8 km	MPC · JPL
611760	2007 EP_{226}	—	March 10, 2007	Mount Lemmon	Mount Lemmon Survey	·	1.2 km	MPC · JPL
611761	2007 EA_{227}	—	March 12, 2007	Catalina	CSS	·	3.8 km	MPC · JPL
611762	2007 ED_{227}	—	March 14, 2007	Mount Lemmon	Mount Lemmon Survey	·	3.1 km	MPC · JPL
611763	2007 ED_{228}	—	March 9, 2007	Kitt Peak	Spacewatch	·	2.4 km	MPC · JPL
611764	2007 EE_{228}	—	November 3, 2015	Mount Lemmon	Mount Lemmon Survey	·	1.7 km	MPC · JPL
611765	2007 EH_{228}	—	March 10, 2007	Kitt Peak	Spacewatch	HYG	2.2 km	MPC · JPL
611766	2007 ED_{229}	—	February 25, 2007	Kitt Peak	Spacewatch	·	2.9 km	MPC · JPL
611767	2007 EN_{229}	—	March 11, 2007	Mount Lemmon	Mount Lemmon Survey	·	1.7 km	MPC · JPL
611768	2007 EJ_{230}	—	June 9, 2016	Haleakala	Pan-STARRS 1	·	1.0 km	MPC · JPL
611769	2007 EM_{231}	—	March 14, 2007	Kitt Peak	Spacewatch	·	1.9 km	MPC · JPL
611770	2007 ET_{231}	—	April 6, 2013	Mount Lemmon	Mount Lemmon Survey	·	2.2 km	MPC · JPL
611771	2007 ER_{233}	—	January 29, 2012	Kitt Peak	Spacewatch	·	1.2 km	MPC · JPL
611772	2007 EX_{233}	—	June 25, 2014	Mount Lemmon	Mount Lemmon Survey	·	2.0 km	MPC · JPL
611773	2007 EM_{235}	—	November 21, 2015	Mount Lemmon	Mount Lemmon Survey	·	2.2 km	MPC · JPL
611774	2007 ER_{235}	—	March 10, 2007	Kitt Peak	Spacewatch	·	1.1 km	MPC · JPL
611775	2007 EV_{235}	—	July 12, 2016	Mount Lemmon	Mount Lemmon Survey	·	930 m	MPC · JPL
611776	2007 EX_{235}	—	March 12, 2007	Kitt Peak	Spacewatch	EOS	1.4 km	MPC · JPL
611777	2007 EJ_{236}	—	September 3, 2014	Mount Lemmon	Mount Lemmon Survey	EMA	2.3 km	MPC · JPL
611778	2007 EY_{236}	—	September 27, 2009	Kitt Peak	Spacewatch	·	2.3 km	MPC · JPL
611779	2007 EF_{237}	—	March 11, 2007	Mount Lemmon	Mount Lemmon Survey	·	2.0 km	MPC · JPL
611780	2007 EJ_{237}	—	October 7, 2012	Haleakala	Pan-STARRS 1	T_{j} (2.98) · 3:2	4.1 km	MPC · JPL
611781	2007 EM_{237}	—	October 17, 2010	Mount Lemmon	Mount Lemmon Survey	·	2.0 km	MPC · JPL
611782	2007 EN_{237}	—	March 19, 2013	Haleakala	Pan-STARRS 1	·	2.1 km	MPC · JPL
611783	2007 EQ_{237}	—	March 9, 2007	Kitt Peak	Spacewatch	·	1.9 km	MPC · JPL
611784	2007 EH_{238}	—	March 14, 2007	Mount Lemmon	Mount Lemmon Survey	·	1.9 km	MPC · JPL
611785	2007 EU_{239}	—	March 14, 2007	Mount Lemmon	Mount Lemmon Survey	·	2.2 km	MPC · JPL
611786	2007 EJ_{240}	—	March 11, 2007	Kitt Peak	Spacewatch	·	2.5 km	MPC · JPL
611787	2007 EK_{240}	—	March 14, 2007	Mount Lemmon	Mount Lemmon Survey	·	2.4 km	MPC · JPL
611788	2007 EO_{240}	—	March 13, 2007	Mount Lemmon	Mount Lemmon Survey	·	2.3 km	MPC · JPL
611789	2007 EU_{240}	—	March 13, 2007	Kitt Peak	Spacewatch	T_{j} (2.89)	3.8 km	MPC · JPL
611790	2007 EV_{240}	—	March 14, 2007	Mount Lemmon	Mount Lemmon Survey	·	2.6 km	MPC · JPL
611791	2007 EE_{242}	—	March 15, 2007	Kitt Peak	Spacewatch	·	1.9 km	MPC · JPL
611792	2007 FY_{3}	—	March 18, 2007	Mount Nyukasa	Japan Aerospace Exploration Agency	·	2.3 km	MPC · JPL
611793	2007 FM_{4}	—	March 18, 2007	Mount Nyukasa	Japan Aerospace Exploration Agency	·	1.2 km	MPC · JPL
611794	2007 FK_{6}	—	March 16, 2007	Mount Lemmon	Mount Lemmon Survey	·	1.1 km	MPC · JPL
611795	2007 FB_{8}	—	March 16, 2007	Mount Lemmon	Mount Lemmon Survey	EOS	1.5 km	MPC · JPL
611796	2007 FH_{11}	—	March 16, 2007	Kitt Peak	Spacewatch	·	3.4 km	MPC · JPL
611797	2007 FX_{11}	—	March 9, 2007	Kitt Peak	Spacewatch	·	1.9 km	MPC · JPL
611798	2007 FF_{14}	—	March 19, 2007	Mount Lemmon	Mount Lemmon Survey	URS	2.5 km	MPC · JPL
611799	2007 FF_{16}	—	March 19, 2007	Mount Lemmon	Mount Lemmon Survey	V	510 m	MPC · JPL
611800	2007 FJ_{20}	—	May 3, 2002	Kitt Peak	Spacewatch	·	3.5 km	MPC · JPL

== 611801–611900 ==
back to top

Designation			Discovery			Properties		Ref
Permanent	Provisional	Named after	Date	Site	Discoverer(s)	Category	Diam.	Ref
611801	2007 FD_{45}	—	March 16, 2007	Mount Lemmon	Mount Lemmon Survey	·	1.9 km	MPC · JPL
611802	2007 FM_{46}	—	March 26, 2007	Mount Lemmon	Mount Lemmon Survey	·	2.5 km	MPC · JPL
611803	2007 FD_{47}	—	March 20, 2007	Mount Lemmon	Mount Lemmon Survey	EOS	2.3 km	MPC · JPL
611804	2007 FJ_{47}	—	August 24, 2001	Kitt Peak	Spacewatch	·	560 m	MPC · JPL
611805	2007 FH_{48}	—	September 19, 1998	Apache Point	SDSS Collaboration	·	2.1 km	MPC · JPL
611806	2007 FW_{52}	—	March 25, 2007	Mount Lemmon	Mount Lemmon Survey	·	2.7 km	MPC · JPL
611807	2007 FY_{52}	—	March 25, 2007	Mount Lemmon	Mount Lemmon Survey	·	2.2 km	MPC · JPL
611808	2007 FB_{53}	—	March 26, 2007	Mount Lemmon	Mount Lemmon Survey	NYS	960 m	MPC · JPL
611809	2007 FG_{54}	—	October 21, 2009	Mount Lemmon	Mount Lemmon Survey	·	1 km	MPC · JPL
611810	2007 FN_{54}	—	March 20, 2007	Kitt Peak	Spacewatch	·	1.2 km	MPC · JPL
611811	2007 FQ_{54}	—	August 3, 2014	Haleakala	Pan-STARRS 1	·	2.2 km	MPC · JPL
611812	2007 FX_{54}	—	October 25, 2015	Haleakala	Pan-STARRS 1	·	2.3 km	MPC · JPL
611813	2007 FY_{54}	—	February 3, 2012	Haleakala	Pan-STARRS 1	·	1.9 km	MPC · JPL
611814	2007 FF_{55}	—	March 18, 2007	Kitt Peak	Spacewatch	·	1.0 km	MPC · JPL
611815	2007 FX_{55}	—	March 15, 2012	Mount Lemmon	Mount Lemmon Survey	·	1.8 km	MPC · JPL
611816	2007 FO_{56}	—	March 17, 2018	Haleakala	Pan-STARRS 1	·	1.6 km	MPC · JPL
611817	2007 FS_{56}	—	March 16, 2007	Mount Lemmon	Mount Lemmon Survey	EOS	1.3 km	MPC · JPL
611818	2007 FY_{57}	—	February 3, 2012	Haleakala	Pan-STARRS 1	·	2.2 km	MPC · JPL
611819	2007 FN_{58}	—	April 12, 2013	Haleakala	Pan-STARRS 1	·	2.1 km	MPC · JPL
611820	2007 FO_{58}	—	July 29, 2014	Haleakala	Pan-STARRS 1	·	1.4 km	MPC · JPL
611821	2007 FJ_{59}	—	October 11, 2012	Mount Lemmon	Mount Lemmon Survey	3:2 · (6124)	3.7 km	MPC · JPL
611822	2007 FY_{59}	—	March 25, 2007	Mount Lemmon	Mount Lemmon Survey	·	2.2 km	MPC · JPL
611823	2007 FW_{60}	—	March 26, 2007	Kitt Peak	Spacewatch	·	2.1 km	MPC · JPL
611824	2007 FX_{60}	—	March 26, 2007	Mount Lemmon	Mount Lemmon Survey	VER	2.0 km	MPC · JPL
611825	2007 FY_{60}	—	March 18, 2007	Kitt Peak	Spacewatch	·	1 km	MPC · JPL
611826	2007 FC_{61}	—	March 16, 2007	Kitt Peak	Spacewatch	·	1.0 km	MPC · JPL
611827	2007 FP_{61}	—	March 20, 2007	Mount Lemmon	Mount Lemmon Survey	·	2.2 km	MPC · JPL
611828	2007 FM_{62}	—	March 25, 2007	Mount Lemmon	Mount Lemmon Survey	EOS	1.8 km	MPC · JPL
611829	2007 GM_{2}	—	March 20, 2007	Catalina	CSS	·	2.6 km	MPC · JPL
611830	2007 GB_{3}	—	March 11, 2007	Mount Lemmon	Mount Lemmon Survey	EOS	1.7 km	MPC · JPL
611831	2007 GE_{11}	—	April 11, 2007	Kitt Peak	Spacewatch	·	2.5 km	MPC · JPL
611832	2007 GM_{11}	—	April 11, 2007	Kitt Peak	Spacewatch	EOS	1.8 km	MPC · JPL
611833	2007 GM_{12}	—	April 11, 2007	Kitt Peak	Spacewatch	·	1.9 km	MPC · JPL
611834	2007 GX_{19}	—	April 11, 2007	Kitt Peak	Spacewatch	·	3.7 km	MPC · JPL
611835	2007 GK_{21}	—	April 11, 2007	Mount Lemmon	Mount Lemmon Survey	EOS	1.8 km	MPC · JPL
611836	2007 GM_{22}	—	April 11, 2007	Mount Lemmon	Mount Lemmon Survey	·	2.9 km	MPC · JPL
611837	2007 GF_{24}	—	April 11, 2007	Kitt Peak	Spacewatch	·	2.5 km	MPC · JPL
611838	2007 GF_{27}	—	April 14, 2007	Kitt Peak	Spacewatch	·	3.3 km	MPC · JPL
611839	2007 GM_{35}	—	March 13, 2007	Mount Lemmon	Mount Lemmon Survey	·	1 km	MPC · JPL
611840	2007 GB_{42}	—	April 14, 2007	Kitt Peak	Spacewatch	·	990 m	MPC · JPL
611841	2007 GD_{44}	—	April 14, 2007	Mount Lemmon	Mount Lemmon Survey	·	1.0 km	MPC · JPL
611842	2007 GF_{44}	—	November 4, 2005	Mount Lemmon	Mount Lemmon Survey	·	1.3 km	MPC · JPL
611843	2007 GW_{46}	—	April 14, 2007	Kitt Peak	Spacewatch	·	3.5 km	MPC · JPL
611844	2007 GS_{47}	—	March 15, 2007	Mount Lemmon	Mount Lemmon Survey	·	1.4 km	MPC · JPL
611845	2007 GG_{52}	—	April 14, 2007	Kitt Peak	Spacewatch	·	3.3 km	MPC · JPL
611846	2007 GV_{54}	—	April 15, 2007	Kitt Peak	Spacewatch	EOS	1.5 km	MPC · JPL
611847	2007 GR_{55}	—	May 23, 2003	Kitt Peak	Spacewatch	·	1.3 km	MPC · JPL
611848	2007 GM_{64}	—	April 15, 2007	Kitt Peak	Spacewatch	·	2.8 km	MPC · JPL
611849	2007 GR_{66}	—	September 22, 2003	Kitt Peak	Spacewatch	THM	2.3 km	MPC · JPL
611850	2007 GX_{67}	—	April 15, 2007	Kitt Peak	Spacewatch	THM	1.9 km	MPC · JPL
611851	2007 GP_{68}	—	April 14, 2007	Mount Lemmon	Mount Lemmon Survey	·	1.1 km	MPC · JPL
611852	2007 GP_{69}	—	March 29, 2007	Kitt Peak	Spacewatch	·	2.1 km	MPC · JPL
611853	2007 GT_{70}	—	March 11, 2007	Mount Lemmon	Mount Lemmon Survey	·	770 m	MPC · JPL
611854	2007 GG_{73}	—	April 11, 2007	Kitt Peak	Spacewatch	·	2.5 km	MPC · JPL
611855	2007 GR_{74}	—	April 14, 2007	Mount Lemmon	Mount Lemmon Survey	·	3.2 km	MPC · JPL
611856	2007 GV_{74}	—	April 15, 2007	Kitt Peak	Spacewatch	·	2.9 km	MPC · JPL
611857	2007 GG_{78}	—	May 19, 2013	Mount Lemmon	Mount Lemmon Survey	·	2.5 km	MPC · JPL
611858	2007 GL_{78}	—	June 29, 2014	Haleakala	Pan-STARRS 1	EOS	1.6 km	MPC · JPL
611859	2007 GW_{78}	—	April 15, 2007	Kitt Peak	Spacewatch	·	460 m	MPC · JPL
611860	2007 GY_{79}	—	April 15, 2007	Kitt Peak	Spacewatch	·	2.2 km	MPC · JPL
611861	2007 HR_{2}	—	April 16, 2007	Mount Lemmon	Mount Lemmon Survey	·	430 m	MPC · JPL
611862	2007 HL_{7}	—	April 16, 2007	Mount Lemmon	Mount Lemmon Survey	T_{j} (2.98) · EUP	3.0 km	MPC · JPL
611863	2007 HA_{9}	—	April 18, 2007	Kitt Peak	Spacewatch	H	430 m	MPC · JPL
611864	2007 HC_{9}	—	April 18, 2007	Kitt Peak	Spacewatch	·	3.1 km	MPC · JPL
611865	2007 HR_{10}	—	April 18, 2007	Mount Lemmon	Mount Lemmon Survey	·	2.2 km	MPC · JPL
611866	2007 HW_{16}	—	March 18, 2007	Kitt Peak	Spacewatch	·	2.6 km	MPC · JPL
611867	2007 HH_{19}	—	April 18, 2007	Kitt Peak	Spacewatch	·	2.4 km	MPC · JPL
611868	2007 HG_{22}	—	April 18, 2007	Kitt Peak	Spacewatch	EOS	1.6 km	MPC · JPL
611869	2007 HJ_{22}	—	April 18, 2007	Kitt Peak	Spacewatch	·	1.2 km	MPC · JPL
611870	2007 HR_{22}	—	April 18, 2007	Kitt Peak	Spacewatch	(159)	2.4 km	MPC · JPL
611871	2007 HA_{23}	—	April 18, 2007	Kitt Peak	Spacewatch	·	590 m	MPC · JPL
611872	2007 HH_{23}	—	April 18, 2007	Kitt Peak	Spacewatch	·	2.7 km	MPC · JPL
611873	2007 HY_{28}	—	March 20, 2007	Mount Lemmon	Mount Lemmon Survey	·	2.4 km	MPC · JPL
611874	2007 HM_{32}	—	April 11, 2007	Kitt Peak	Spacewatch	VER	2.5 km	MPC · JPL
611875	2007 HQ_{32}	—	October 10, 2004	Kitt Peak	Spacewatch	·	2.6 km	MPC · JPL
611876	2007 HN_{37}	—	January 24, 2003	La Silla	A. Boattini, Hainaut, O.	·	1.0 km	MPC · JPL
611877	2007 HM_{39}	—	April 20, 2007	Mount Lemmon	Mount Lemmon Survey	·	2.6 km	MPC · JPL
611878	2007 HQ_{39}	—	April 20, 2007	Mount Lemmon	Mount Lemmon Survey	·	2.1 km	MPC · JPL
611879	2007 HQ_{42}	—	April 22, 2007	Mount Lemmon	Mount Lemmon Survey	·	1.1 km	MPC · JPL
611880	2007 HW_{42}	—	April 22, 2007	Mount Lemmon	Mount Lemmon Survey	·	1.3 km	MPC · JPL
611881	2007 HC_{43}	—	April 22, 2007	Mount Lemmon	Mount Lemmon Survey	EOS	1.5 km	MPC · JPL
611882	2007 HE_{45}	—	April 11, 2007	Catalina	CSS	T_{j} (2.99) · EUP	3.6 km	MPC · JPL
611883	2007 HY_{47}	—	April 20, 2007	Kitt Peak	Spacewatch	HYG	3.1 km	MPC · JPL
611884	2007 HC_{48}	—	April 20, 2007	Kitt Peak	Spacewatch	·	1.3 km	MPC · JPL
611885	2007 HO_{48}	—	April 20, 2007	Kitt Peak	Spacewatch	·	1.7 km	MPC · JPL
611886	2007 HY_{49}	—	April 20, 2007	Kitt Peak	Spacewatch	(5)	1.2 km	MPC · JPL
611887	2007 HG_{50}	—	April 20, 2007	Kitt Peak	Spacewatch	·	580 m	MPC · JPL
611888	2007 HL_{51}	—	April 20, 2007	Kitt Peak	Spacewatch	TIR	2.2 km	MPC · JPL
611889	2007 HY_{52}	—	April 20, 2007	Kitt Peak	Spacewatch	·	2.3 km	MPC · JPL
611890	2007 HT_{53}	—	October 4, 2004	Palomar	NEAT	·	1.5 km	MPC · JPL
611891	2007 HU_{55}	—	April 22, 2007	Kitt Peak	Spacewatch	·	2.6 km	MPC · JPL
611892	2007 HK_{57}	—	April 22, 2007	Mount Lemmon	Mount Lemmon Survey	·	660 m	MPC · JPL
611893	2007 HG_{61}	—	April 20, 2007	Kitt Peak	Spacewatch	·	3.3 km	MPC · JPL
611894	2007 HE_{62}	—	April 22, 2007	Mount Lemmon	Mount Lemmon Survey	·	2.1 km	MPC · JPL
611895	2007 HB_{70}	—	April 24, 2007	Kitt Peak	Spacewatch	·	2.8 km	MPC · JPL
611896	2007 HF_{70}	—	January 7, 2006	Kitt Peak	Spacewatch	·	1.7 km	MPC · JPL
611897	2007 HN_{70}	—	April 19, 2007	Mount Lemmon	Mount Lemmon Survey	·	1.8 km	MPC · JPL
611898	2007 HO_{70}	—	March 14, 2007	Mount Lemmon	Mount Lemmon Survey	·	1.5 km	MPC · JPL
611899	2007 HT_{76}	—	April 23, 2007	Kitt Peak	Spacewatch	·	800 m	MPC · JPL
611900	2007 HX_{80}	—	April 14, 2007	Mount Lemmon	Mount Lemmon Survey	·	960 m	MPC · JPL

== 611901–612000 ==
back to top

Designation			Discovery			Properties		Ref
Permanent	Provisional	Named after	Date	Site	Discoverer(s)	Category	Diam.	Ref
611901	2007 HN_{82}	—	April 25, 2007	Mount Lemmon	Mount Lemmon Survey	EUN	1.1 km	MPC · JPL
611902	2007 HS_{83}	—	April 15, 2007	Catalina	CSS	·	1.4 km	MPC · JPL
611903	2007 HF_{85}	—	April 24, 2007	Kitt Peak	Spacewatch	VER	2.6 km	MPC · JPL
611904	2007 HV_{87}	—	April 25, 2007	Kitt Peak	Spacewatch	·	1.2 km	MPC · JPL
611905	2007 HR_{88}	—	March 15, 2007	Mount Lemmon	Mount Lemmon Survey	LIX	3.3 km	MPC · JPL
611906	2007 HQ_{96}	—	April 18, 2007	Mount Lemmon	Mount Lemmon Survey	·	2.6 km	MPC · JPL
611907	2007 HW_{96}	—	April 16, 2007	Mount Lemmon	Mount Lemmon Survey	·	1.6 km	MPC · JPL
611908	2007 HR_{98}	—	March 26, 2007	Mount Lemmon	Mount Lemmon Survey	·	2.9 km	MPC · JPL
611909	2007 HW_{99}	—	April 18, 2007	Mount Lemmon	Mount Lemmon Survey	·	2.8 km	MPC · JPL
611910	2007 HL_{100}	—	April 25, 2007	Mount Lemmon	Mount Lemmon Survey	EOS	1.6 km	MPC · JPL
611911	2007 HC_{101}	—	October 10, 2015	Haleakala	Pan-STARRS 1	EOS	2.0 km	MPC · JPL
611912	2007 HH_{101}	—	April 25, 2007	Kitt Peak	Spacewatch	EOS	1.8 km	MPC · JPL
611913	2007 HS_{101}	—	July 4, 2016	Haleakala	Pan-STARRS 1	·	1.1 km	MPC · JPL
611914	2007 HT_{101}	—	April 20, 2007	Kitt Peak	Spacewatch	EOS	1.7 km	MPC · JPL
611915	2007 HX_{101}	—	December 5, 2015	Haleakala	Pan-STARRS 1	EOS	1.5 km	MPC · JPL
611916	2007 HP_{102}	—	April 24, 2007	Mount Lemmon	Mount Lemmon Survey	·	2.7 km	MPC · JPL
611917	2007 HS_{102}	—	November 6, 2010	Mount Lemmon	Mount Lemmon Survey	·	2.1 km	MPC · JPL
611918	2007 HU_{102}	—	March 18, 2010	Mount Lemmon	Mount Lemmon Survey	·	480 m	MPC · JPL
611919	2007 HC_{103}	—	March 25, 2007	Mount Lemmon	Mount Lemmon Survey	·	1.4 km	MPC · JPL
611920	2007 HT_{103}	—	April 5, 2011	Mount Lemmon	Mount Lemmon Survey	·	1.2 km	MPC · JPL
611921	2007 HO_{104}	—	April 25, 2007	Catalina	CSS	·	3.1 km	MPC · JPL
611922	2007 HV_{104}	—	April 23, 2007	Mount Lemmon	Mount Lemmon Survey	·	3.0 km	MPC · JPL
611923	2007 HW_{104}	—	April 19, 2007	Mount Lemmon	Mount Lemmon Survey	EOS	1.7 km	MPC · JPL
611924	2007 HC_{105}	—	April 19, 2013	Haleakala	Pan-STARRS 1	·	2.5 km	MPC · JPL
611925	2007 HU_{106}	—	April 19, 2007	Mount Lemmon	Mount Lemmon Survey	·	2.2 km	MPC · JPL
611926	2007 HO_{109}	—	August 28, 2014	Haleakala	Pan-STARRS 1	EOS	1.4 km	MPC · JPL
611927	2007 HK_{110}	—	April 22, 2007	Kitt Peak	Spacewatch	·	2.1 km	MPC · JPL
611928	2007 HU_{110}	—	April 20, 2007	Kitt Peak	Spacewatch	·	2.9 km	MPC · JPL
611929	2007 HE_{111}	—	April 19, 2007	Kitt Peak	Spacewatch	·	840 m	MPC · JPL
611930	2007 HR_{111}	—	April 18, 2007	Mount Lemmon	Mount Lemmon Survey	·	1.1 km	MPC · JPL
611931	2007 HG_{112}	—	April 23, 2007	Mount Lemmon	Mount Lemmon Survey	EOS	1.6 km	MPC · JPL
611932	2007 JC_{8}	—	May 9, 2007	Mount Lemmon	Mount Lemmon Survey	·	870 m	MPC · JPL
611933	2007 JT_{13}	—	May 9, 2007	Mount Lemmon	Mount Lemmon Survey	·	2.1 km	MPC · JPL
611934	2007 JQ_{14}	—	May 10, 2007	Mount Lemmon	Mount Lemmon Survey	·	1.1 km	MPC · JPL
611935	2007 JT_{16}	—	September 30, 2003	Kitt Peak	Spacewatch	·	3.6 km	MPC · JPL
611936	2007 JN_{18}	—	March 25, 2007	Mount Lemmon	Mount Lemmon Survey	TIR	2.9 km	MPC · JPL
611937	2007 JK_{20}	—	May 11, 2007	Mount Lemmon	Mount Lemmon Survey	·	500 m	MPC · JPL
611938	2007 JS_{20}	—	May 11, 2007	Mount Lemmon	Mount Lemmon Survey	EOS	1.3 km	MPC · JPL
611939	2007 JY_{20}	—	May 11, 2007	Mount Lemmon	Mount Lemmon Survey	·	910 m	MPC · JPL
611940	2007 JB_{24}	—	May 9, 2007	Kitt Peak	Spacewatch	·	2.6 km	MPC · JPL
611941	2007 JJ_{24}	—	February 2, 2006	Kitt Peak	Spacewatch	·	2.6 km	MPC · JPL
611942	2007 JD_{25}	—	May 9, 2007	Mount Lemmon	Mount Lemmon Survey	·	3.1 km	MPC · JPL
611943	2007 JQ_{28}	—	May 10, 2007	Mount Lemmon	Mount Lemmon Survey	·	2.7 km	MPC · JPL
611944	2007 JT_{28}	—	May 10, 2007	Mount Lemmon	Mount Lemmon Survey	·	910 m	MPC · JPL
611945	2007 JU_{29}	—	April 20, 2007	Kitt Peak	Spacewatch	·	3.0 km	MPC · JPL
611946	2007 JV_{30}	—	January 31, 2006	Kitt Peak	Spacewatch	·	1.1 km	MPC · JPL
611947	2007 JY_{31}	—	April 19, 2007	Mount Lemmon	Mount Lemmon Survey	·	560 m	MPC · JPL
611948	2007 JM_{33}	—	May 12, 2007	Mount Lemmon	Mount Lemmon Survey	EOS	1.8 km	MPC · JPL
611949	2007 JO_{38}	—	April 11, 2007	Kitt Peak	Spacewatch	H	450 m	MPC · JPL
611950	2007 JX_{42}	—	May 14, 2007	Siding Spring	SSS	·	1.8 km	MPC · JPL
611951	2007 JN_{43}	—	March 10, 2007	Palomar	NEAT	·	990 m	MPC · JPL
611952	2007 JK_{44}	—	April 18, 2007	Mount Lemmon	Mount Lemmon Survey	·	520 m	MPC · JPL
611953	2007 JL_{45}	—	May 10, 2007	Mount Lemmon	Mount Lemmon Survey	TIR	3.8 km	MPC · JPL
611954	2007 JS_{46}	—	May 13, 2007	Mount Lemmon	Mount Lemmon Survey	·	2.2 km	MPC · JPL
611955	2007 JA_{47}	—	May 11, 2007	Mount Lemmon	Mount Lemmon Survey	·	1.4 km	MPC · JPL
611956	2007 JO_{47}	—	July 3, 2008	Mount Lemmon	Mount Lemmon Survey	·	3.2 km	MPC · JPL
611957	2007 JG_{48}	—	April 15, 2015	Mount Lemmon	Mount Lemmon Survey	·	1.7 km	MPC · JPL
611958	2007 JV_{48}	—	February 13, 2011	Mount Lemmon	Mount Lemmon Survey	·	2.8 km	MPC · JPL
611959	2007 JX_{48}	—	August 30, 2014	Mount Lemmon	Mount Lemmon Survey	·	2.4 km	MPC · JPL
611960	2007 JD_{49}	—	September 27, 2009	Mount Lemmon	Mount Lemmon Survey	·	3.1 km	MPC · JPL
611961	2007 JG_{49}	—	May 13, 2007	Mount Lemmon	Mount Lemmon Survey	·	2.6 km	MPC · JPL
611962	2007 JH_{49}	—	January 10, 2006	Kitt Peak	Spacewatch	EUP	2.8 km	MPC · JPL
611963	2007 JN_{49}	—	October 15, 2009	Mount Lemmon	Mount Lemmon Survey	VER	2.0 km	MPC · JPL
611964	2007 JS_{50}	—	January 8, 2011	Mount Lemmon	Mount Lemmon Survey	EOS	1.5 km	MPC · JPL
611965	2007 JT_{50}	—	February 21, 2017	Mount Lemmon	Mount Lemmon Survey	·	2.1 km	MPC · JPL
611966	2007 JF_{51}	—	January 28, 2014	Mount Lemmon	Mount Lemmon Survey	·	1.3 km	MPC · JPL
611967	2007 JJ_{51}	—	May 12, 2007	Mount Lemmon	Mount Lemmon Survey	·	2.3 km	MPC · JPL
611968	2007 KV_{3}	—	April 26, 2007	Mount Lemmon	Mount Lemmon Survey	·	2.5 km	MPC · JPL
611969	2007 KZ_{9}	—	October 9, 2015	Haleakala	Pan-STARRS 1	·	2.7 km	MPC · JPL
611970	2007 KM_{10}	—	May 25, 2007	Mount Lemmon	Mount Lemmon Survey	EUN	1.1 km	MPC · JPL
611971	2007 KT_{10}	—	January 29, 2011	Mount Lemmon	Mount Lemmon Survey	·	2.9 km	MPC · JPL
611972	2007 KY_{11}	—	May 26, 2007	Mount Lemmon	Mount Lemmon Survey	·	1.1 km	MPC · JPL
611973	2007 LC	—	June 5, 2007	Bergisch Gladbach	W. Bickel	·	2.4 km	MPC · JPL
611974	2007 LG_{5}	—	May 16, 2007	Mount Lemmon	Mount Lemmon Survey	·	2.8 km	MPC · JPL
611975	2007 LW_{6}	—	June 8, 2007	Kitt Peak	Spacewatch	·	570 m	MPC · JPL
611976	2007 LE_{8}	—	May 13, 2007	Mount Lemmon	Mount Lemmon Survey	·	2.0 km	MPC · JPL
611977	2007 LR_{18}	—	April 24, 2007	Mount Lemmon	Mount Lemmon Survey	·	1.1 km	MPC · JPL
611978	2007 LC_{27}	—	May 13, 2007	Kitt Peak	Spacewatch	JUN	510 m	MPC · JPL
611979	2007 LH_{27}	—	June 12, 2007	Kitt Peak	Spacewatch	·	1.2 km	MPC · JPL
611980 Pauquachin	2007 LH_{30}	Pauquachin	June 11, 2007	Mauna Kea	D. D. Balam, K. M. Perrett	·	1.4 km	MPC · JPL
611981	2007 LS_{34}	—	April 24, 2007	Mount Lemmon	Mount Lemmon Survey	·	1.1 km	MPC · JPL
611982	2007 LX_{35}	—	June 10, 2007	Kitt Peak	Spacewatch	·	2.5 km	MPC · JPL
611983	2007 LY_{35}	—	June 10, 2007	Kitt Peak	Spacewatch	·	1.4 km	MPC · JPL
611984	2007 LC_{36}	—	June 10, 2007	Kitt Peak	Spacewatch	URS	2.7 km	MPC · JPL
611985	2007 LN_{36}	—	March 24, 2006	Mount Lemmon	Mount Lemmon Survey	·	2.4 km	MPC · JPL
611986	2007 LU_{36}	—	April 23, 2007	Mount Lemmon	Mount Lemmon Survey	·	2.4 km	MPC · JPL
611987	2007 LG_{37}	—	June 14, 2007	Kitt Peak	Spacewatch	·	1.1 km	MPC · JPL
611988	2007 LP_{38}	—	November 22, 2008	Mount Lemmon	Mount Lemmon Survey	·	1.4 km	MPC · JPL
611989	2007 LU_{38}	—	May 14, 2015	Haleakala	Pan-STARRS 1	H	380 m	MPC · JPL
611990	2007 LM_{39}	—	March 16, 2012	Mount Lemmon	Mount Lemmon Survey	·	1.8 km	MPC · JPL
611991	2007 LQ_{39}	—	August 6, 2016	Haleakala	Pan-STARRS 1	EUN	810 m	MPC · JPL
611992	2007 MM_{1}	—	May 10, 2007	Mount Lemmon	Mount Lemmon Survey	·	3.8 km	MPC · JPL
611993	2007 MS_{1}	—	March 25, 2007	Mount Lemmon	Mount Lemmon Survey	·	1.2 km	MPC · JPL
611994	2007 MN_{2}	—	May 16, 2007	Kitt Peak	Spacewatch	·	1.3 km	MPC · JPL
611995	2007 MR_{4}	—	May 26, 2007	Mount Lemmon	Mount Lemmon Survey	·	790 m	MPC · JPL
611996	2007 MS_{5}	—	June 17, 2007	Kitt Peak	Spacewatch	·	1.2 km	MPC · JPL
611997	2007 MK_{9}	—	May 13, 2007	Mount Lemmon	Mount Lemmon Survey	EOS	1.7 km	MPC · JPL
611998	2007 MX_{12}	—	June 21, 2007	Mount Lemmon	Mount Lemmon Survey	·	3.1 km	MPC · JPL
611999	2007 MY_{16}	—	May 7, 2007	Mount Lemmon	Mount Lemmon Survey	·	1.3 km	MPC · JPL
612000	2007 MQ_{17}	—	June 21, 2007	Mount Lemmon	Mount Lemmon Survey	ADE	1.3 km	MPC · JPL

back to top

== Meaning of names ==
As minor planet discoveries are confirmed, they are given a permanent number by the IAU's Minor Planet Center (MPC), and the discoverers can then submit names for them, following the IAU's naming conventions. The list below concerns those minor planets in the specified number-range that have received names, and explains the meanings of those names.

Official naming citations of newly named small Solar System bodies are approved and published in a bulletin by IAU's Working Group for Small Bodies Nomenclature (WGSBN). Before May 2021, citations were published in MPC's Minor Planet Circulars for many decades. Recent citations can also be found on the JPL Small-Body Database (SBDB). Until his death in 2016, German astronomer Lutz D. Schmadel compiled these citations into the Dictionary of Minor Planet Names (DMP) and regularly updated the collection.

Based on Paul Herget's The Names of the Minor Planets, Schmadel also researched the unclear origin of numerous asteroids, most of which had been named prior to World War II. This article incorporates text from this source, which is in the public domain: SBDB New namings may only be added to this list below after official publication as the preannouncement of names is condemned. The WGSBN publishes a comprehensive guideline for the naming rules of non-cometary small Solar System bodies.

Named minor planet	Provisional	This minor planet was named for...	Ref · Catalog
611064 Jeroenstil	2006 RF_{3}	Jeroen Stil, Canadian Associate Professor of Physics and Astronomy at the University of Calgary.	IAU · 611064
611070 Hsurueron	2006 RG_{23}	Rue-Ron Hsu (b. 1958) is a physicist who serves at the Department of Physics, National Cheng Kung University.	IAU · 611070
611326 Wilfredbuck	2006 UT_{216}	Wilfred Buck, Canadian knowledge keeper of Cree/Ininewuk star lore.	IAU · 611326
611494 Gionti	2006 WV_{212}	Gabriele Gionti (b. 1967), an Italian theoretical cosmologist and Jesuit priest.	IAU · 611494
611585 Bergbusch	2007 BA_{31}	Peter A. Bergbusch, Canadian astronomer.	IAU · 611585
611586 Tsartlip	2007 BJ_{31}	The Tsartlip First Nation, one of five bands that comprise the Saanich Nation, located on the west coast of Canada.	IAU · 611586
611587 Tseycum	2007 BK_{31}	The Tseycum First Nation, one of five bands that comprise the Saanich Nation, located on the west coast of Canada.	IAU · 611587
611980 Pauquachin	2007 LH_{30}	The Pauquachin First Nation is one of five bands that comprise the Saanich Nation, located on the west coast of Canada.	IAU · 611980
