= List of minor planets: 618001–619000 =

The following is a partial list of minor planets, running from minor-planet number 618001 through 619000, inclusive. The primary data for this and other partial lists is based on JPL's "Small-Body Orbital Elements" and data available from the Minor Planet Center. Critical list information is also provided by the MPC, unless otherwise specified from Lowell Observatory. A detailed description of the table's columns and additional sources are given on the main page including a complete list of every page in this series, and a statistical break-up on the dynamical classification of minor planets.

Also see the summary list of all named bodies in numerical and alphabetical order, and the corresponding naming citations for the number range of this particular list. New namings may only be added to this list after official publication, as the preannouncement of names is condemned by the Working Group for Small Bodies Nomenclature of the International Astronomical Union.

Near-Earth obj.	MBA (inner)	MBA (outer)	Centaur
Mars-crosser	MBA (middle)	Jupiter trojan	Trans-Neptunian obj.
Unclassified

== 618001–618100 ==
Designation			Discovery			Properties		Ref
Permanent	Provisional	Named after	Date	Site	Discoverer(s)	Category	Diam.	Ref
618001	2006 SQ_{335}	—	June 13, 2005	Kitt Peak	Spacewatch	·	1.5 km	MPC; JPL
618002	2006 SD_{337}	—	September 28, 2006	Kitt Peak	Spacewatch	·	2.5 km	MPC; JPL
618003	2006 SD_{342}	—	September 28, 2006	Kitt Peak	Spacewatch	·	2.5 km	MPC; JPL
618004	2006 SK_{351}	—	September 20, 2006	Kitt Peak	Spacewatch	·	610 m	MPC; JPL
618005	2006 SU_{363}	—	September 30, 2006	Mount Lemmon	Mount Lemmon Survey	·	1.2 km	MPC; JPL
618006	2006 SB_{369}	—	September 26, 2006	Moletai	K. Černis, Zdanavicius, J.	·	1.4 km	MPC; JPL
618007	2006 SG_{373}	—	September 16, 2006	Apache Point	SDSS Collaboration	·	1.3 km	MPC; JPL
618008	2006 SD_{374}	—	September 16, 2006	Apache Point	SDSS Collaboration	·	2.9 km	MPC; JPL
618009	2006 SC_{382}	—	August 28, 2006	Apache Point	SDSS Collaboration	EOS	1.8 km	MPC; JPL
618010	2006 SQ_{382}	—	September 28, 2006	Apache Point	SDSS Collaboration	·	1.2 km	MPC; JPL
618011	2006 SN_{386}	—	September 11, 2006	Apache Point	SDSS Collaboration	·	2.8 km	MPC; JPL
618012	2006 SL_{394}	—	September 29, 2006	Apache Point	SDSS Collaboration	·	1.3 km	MPC; JPL
618013	2006 SO_{398}	—	September 16, 2006	Catalina	CSS	·	730 m	MPC; JPL
618014	2006 SU_{400}	—	September 25, 2006	Catalina	CSS	·	1.7 km	MPC; JPL
618015	2006 SF_{401}	—	September 27, 2006	Mount Lemmon	Mount Lemmon Survey	·	570 m	MPC; JPL
618016	2006 SV_{405}	—	September 17, 2006	Kitt Peak	Spacewatch	·	990 m	MPC; JPL
618017	2006 SG_{407}	—	September 30, 2006	Catalina	CSS	·	1.3 km	MPC; JPL
618018	2006 SC_{415}	—	September 26, 2006	Mount Lemmon	Mount Lemmon Survey	·	1.2 km	MPC; JPL
618019	2006 SL_{423}	—	May 4, 2009	Mount Lemmon	Mount Lemmon Survey	·	1.1 km	MPC; JPL
618020	2006 SR_{426}	—	December 13, 2013	Mount Lemmon	Mount Lemmon Survey	·	2.7 km	MPC; JPL
618021	2006 SL_{427}	—	September 30, 2006	Mount Lemmon	Mount Lemmon Survey	·	2.4 km	MPC; JPL
618022	2006 SM_{427}	—	February 20, 2009	Kitt Peak	Spacewatch	·	2.3 km	MPC; JPL
618023	2006 SV_{430}	—	September 18, 2006	Vail-Jarnac	Jarnac	·	930 m	MPC; JPL
618024	2006 SH_{433}	—	September 29, 2006	Anderson Mesa	LONEOS	·	1.6 km	MPC; JPL
618025	2006 SK_{433}	—	February 8, 2008	Mount Lemmon	Mount Lemmon Survey	·	1.2 km	MPC; JPL
618026	2006 SL_{433}	—	October 9, 2015	Haleakala	Pan-STARRS 1	EUN	850 m	MPC; JPL
618027	2006 SM_{433}	—	August 18, 2006	Kitt Peak	Spacewatch	·	590 m	MPC; JPL
618028	2006 SB_{434}	—	September 18, 2006	Anderson Mesa	LONEOS	·	1.3 km	MPC; JPL
618029	2006 SO_{434}	—	September 15, 2006	Kitt Peak	Spacewatch	·	1.2 km	MPC; JPL
618030	2006 SB_{435}	—	September 12, 2015	Haleakala	Pan-STARRS 1	·	1.3 km	MPC; JPL
618031	2006 SU_{440}	—	September 16, 2006	Catalina	CSS	·	1.9 km	MPC; JPL
618032	2006 ST_{454}	—	September 17, 2006	Kitt Peak	Spacewatch	HNS	610 m	MPC; JPL
618033	2006 TY_{7}	—	September 16, 2006	Catalina	CSS	·	970 m	MPC; JPL
618034	2006 TD_{37}	—	September 30, 2006	Mount Lemmon	Mount Lemmon Survey	·	1.4 km	MPC; JPL
618035	2006 TH_{67}	—	September 28, 2006	Catalina	CSS	·	940 m	MPC; JPL
618036	2006 TZ_{67}	—	September 28, 2006	Catalina	CSS	·	1.4 km	MPC; JPL
618037	2006 TD_{81}	—	October 13, 2006	Kitt Peak	Spacewatch	·	780 m	MPC; JPL
618038	2006 TV_{83}	—	October 13, 2006	Kitt Peak	Spacewatch	·	910 m	MPC; JPL
618039	2006 TG_{103}	—	October 2, 2006	Mount Lemmon	Mount Lemmon Survey	·	640 m	MPC; JPL
618040	2006 TX_{106}	—	October 15, 2006	Catalina	CSS	·	510 m	MPC; JPL
618041	2006 TT_{108}	—	September 29, 2006	Apache Point	SDSS Collaboration	·	2.1 km	MPC; JPL
618042	2006 TK_{118}	—	October 3, 2006	Apache Point	SDSS Collaboration	MAR	1.2 km	MPC; JPL
618043	2006 TB_{124}	—	October 2, 2006	Mount Lemmon	Mount Lemmon Survey	·	1.2 km	MPC; JPL
618044	2006 TZ_{131}	—	October 2, 2006	Mount Lemmon	Mount Lemmon Survey	·	570 m	MPC; JPL
618045	2006 TQ_{132}	—	October 2, 2006	Mount Lemmon	Mount Lemmon Survey	·	590 m	MPC; JPL
618046	2006 TY_{133}	—	October 12, 2006	Palomar	NEAT	TIR	2.5 km	MPC; JPL
618047	2006 TA_{135}	—	March 26, 2008	Mount Lemmon	Mount Lemmon Survey	·	500 m	MPC; JPL
618048	2006 TP_{135}	—	October 4, 2006	Mount Lemmon	Mount Lemmon Survey	HNS	1.2 km	MPC; JPL
618049	2006 TQ_{135}	—	April 11, 2013	Mount Lemmon	Mount Lemmon Survey	·	1.3 km	MPC; JPL
618050	2006 TV_{135}	—	October 3, 2006	Mount Lemmon	Mount Lemmon Survey	·	1.2 km	MPC; JPL
618051 Sawicki	2006 TC_{137}	Sawicki	December 16, 2003	Mauna Kea	D. D. Balam	·	490 m	MPC; JPL
618052	2006 TA_{139}	—	October 3, 2006	Mount Lemmon	Mount Lemmon Survey	·	1.1 km	MPC; JPL
618053	2006 UC_{14}	—	October 17, 2006	Mount Lemmon	Mount Lemmon Survey	·	1.4 km	MPC; JPL
618054	2006 UY_{20}	—	October 16, 2006	Kitt Peak	Spacewatch	·	950 m	MPC; JPL
618055	2006 UU_{51}	—	October 17, 2006	Kitt Peak	Spacewatch	·	3.0 km	MPC; JPL
618056	2006 UE_{68}	—	October 16, 2006	Catalina	CSS	·	1.4 km	MPC; JPL
618057	2006 UC_{86}	—	September 27, 2006	Mount Lemmon	Mount Lemmon Survey	·	1.4 km	MPC; JPL
618058	2006 UV_{98}	—	October 18, 2006	Kitt Peak	Spacewatch	·	1.0 km	MPC; JPL
618059	2006 UC_{102}	—	September 15, 2006	Kitt Peak	Spacewatch	·	2.5 km	MPC; JPL
618060	2006 UN_{103}	—	October 18, 2006	Kitt Peak	Spacewatch	EUN	850 m	MPC; JPL
618061	2006 UE_{132}	—	September 26, 2006	Kitt Peak	Spacewatch	·	900 m	MPC; JPL
618062	2006 UD_{134}	—	October 19, 2006	Kitt Peak	Spacewatch	·	480 m	MPC; JPL
618063	2006 UO_{144}	—	October 19, 2006	Kitt Peak	Spacewatch	MRX	950 m	MPC; JPL
618064	2006 UE_{146}	—	May 14, 2005	Mount Lemmon	Mount Lemmon Survey	·	750 m	MPC; JPL
618065	2006 UP_{148}	—	September 30, 2006	Mount Lemmon	Mount Lemmon Survey	·	1.0 km	MPC; JPL
618066	2006 UE_{159}	—	October 21, 2006	Mount Lemmon	Mount Lemmon Survey	·	480 m	MPC; JPL
618067	2006 UR_{160}	—	September 19, 2006	Kitt Peak	Spacewatch	·	2.6 km	MPC; JPL
618068	2006 UR_{235}	—	September 24, 2006	Kitt Peak	Spacewatch	·	950 m	MPC; JPL
618069	2006 UO_{238}	—	October 4, 2006	Mount Lemmon	Mount Lemmon Survey	MAR	820 m	MPC; JPL
618070	2006 UG_{254}	—	October 20, 2006	Kitt Peak	Spacewatch	·	1.1 km	MPC; JPL
618071	2006 UA_{257}	—	September 25, 2006	Mount Lemmon	Mount Lemmon Survey	·	600 m	MPC; JPL
618072	2006 UD_{266}	—	October 17, 2006	Kitt Peak	Spacewatch	·	1.5 km	MPC; JPL
618073	2006 UV_{268}	—	October 27, 2006	Mount Lemmon	Mount Lemmon Survey	·	3.2 km	MPC; JPL
618074	2006 UO_{277}	—	October 19, 2006	Kitt Peak	Spacewatch	·	1.2 km	MPC; JPL
618075	2006 UK_{286}	—	April 9, 2003	Kitt Peak	Spacewatch	·	2.5 km	MPC; JPL
618076	2006 UK_{308}	—	October 19, 2006	Kitt Peak	Deep Ecliptic Survey	·	1.1 km	MPC; JPL
618077	2006 UK_{312}	—	October 16, 2006	Kitt Peak	Spacewatch	·	2.6 km	MPC; JPL
618078	2006 UO_{319}	—	November 24, 2006	Mount Lemmon	Mount Lemmon Survey	·	1.2 km	MPC; JPL
618079	2006 UU_{322}	—	October 16, 2006	Kitt Peak	Spacewatch	·	520 m	MPC; JPL
618080	2006 UZ_{349}	—	October 26, 2006	Mauna Kea	P. A. Wiegert	·	1.2 km	MPC; JPL
618081	2006 UR_{363}	—	October 17, 2006	Mount Lemmon	Mount Lemmon Survey	·	640 m	MPC; JPL
618082	2006 UW_{363}	—	October 19, 2006	Mount Lemmon	Mount Lemmon Survey	·	1.3 km	MPC; JPL
618083	2006 UJ_{364}	—	October 21, 2006	Mount Lemmon	Mount Lemmon Survey	(5)	870 m	MPC; JPL
618084	2006 UM_{364}	—	October 21, 2006	Mount Lemmon	Mount Lemmon Survey	·	640 m	MPC; JPL
618085	2006 UD_{367}	—	October 16, 2006	Kitt Peak	Spacewatch	·	570 m	MPC; JPL
618086	2006 UN_{367}	—	September 19, 2017	Haleakala	Pan-STARRS 1	H	350 m	MPC; JPL
618087	2006 UG_{368}	—	January 11, 2008	Mount Lemmon	Mount Lemmon Survey	·	1.4 km	MPC; JPL
618088	2006 UP_{368}	—	October 27, 2006	Kitt Peak	Spacewatch	·	1.7 km	MPC; JPL
618089	2006 UD_{369}	—	October 12, 2006	Kitt Peak	Spacewatch	·	2.4 km	MPC; JPL
618090 Rucinski	2006 UC_{370}	Rucinski	October 23, 2006	Mauna Kea	D. D. Balam	·	2.1 km	MPC; JPL
618091	2006 UZ_{372}	—	October 22, 2006	Kitt Peak	Spacewatch	·	1.2 km	MPC; JPL
618092	2006 UZ_{373}	—	October 22, 2006	Kitt Peak	Spacewatch	·	930 m	MPC; JPL
618093	2006 UO_{374}	—	October 16, 2006	Catalina	CSS	·	1.3 km	MPC; JPL
618094	2006 UN_{375}	—	May 21, 2015	Haleakala	Pan-STARRS 1	·	2.7 km	MPC; JPL
618095	2006 UT_{385}	—	October 23, 2006	Kitt Peak	Spacewatch	·	710 m	MPC; JPL
618096	2006 UZ_{393}	—	October 21, 2006	Mount Lemmon	Mount Lemmon Survey	KOR	1.1 km	MPC; JPL
618097	2006 VE_{8}	—	November 10, 2006	Kitt Peak	Spacewatch	·	1.5 km	MPC; JPL
618098	2006 VO_{8}	—	November 11, 2006	Kitt Peak	Spacewatch	·	500 m	MPC; JPL
618099	2006 VW_{35}	—	July 31, 2005	Palomar	NEAT	·	3.1 km	MPC; JPL
618100	2006 VH_{73}	—	November 11, 2006	Kitt Peak	Spacewatch	H	490 m	MPC; JPL

== 618101–618200 ==
back to top

Designation			Discovery			Properties		Ref
Permanent	Provisional	Named after	Date	Site	Discoverer(s)	Category	Diam.	Ref
618101	2006 VA_{77}	—	November 12, 2006	Mount Lemmon	Mount Lemmon Survey	·	650 m	MPC; JPL
618102	2006 VD_{108}	—	October 4, 2006	Mount Lemmon	Mount Lemmon Survey	·	670 m	MPC; JPL
618103	2006 VB_{124}	—	November 14, 2006	Kitt Peak	Spacewatch	·	1.7 km	MPC; JPL
618104	2006 VR_{137}	—	November 15, 2006	Kitt Peak	Spacewatch	·	1.4 km	MPC; JPL
618105	2006 VF_{145}	—	November 15, 2006	Catalina	CSS	EUN	990 m	MPC; JPL
618106	2006 VL_{177}	—	November 1, 2006	Mount Lemmon	Mount Lemmon Survey	·	2.5 km	MPC; JPL
618107	2006 VW_{177}	—	November 15, 2006	Kitt Peak	Spacewatch	·	860 m	MPC; JPL
618108	2006 VD_{178}	—	November 11, 2006	Kitt Peak	Spacewatch	·	1.2 km	MPC; JPL
618109	2006 VA_{179}	—	March 15, 2013	Mount Lemmon	Mount Lemmon Survey	(5)	1.1 km	MPC; JPL
618110	2006 VU_{184}	—	November 2, 2006	Bergisch Gladbach	W. Bickel	·	1.3 km	MPC; JPL
618111	2006 VY_{184}	—	November 12, 2006	Mount Lemmon	Mount Lemmon Survey	·	2.7 km	MPC; JPL
618112	2006 WE_{8}	—	November 16, 2006	Mount Lemmon	Mount Lemmon Survey	·	550 m	MPC; JPL
618113	2006 WG_{9}	—	November 16, 2006	Kitt Peak	Spacewatch	·	2.4 km	MPC; JPL
618114	2006 WB_{17}	—	November 17, 2006	Mount Lemmon	Mount Lemmon Survey	HNS	1.2 km	MPC; JPL
618115	2006 WA_{18}	—	October 2, 2006	Mount Lemmon	Mount Lemmon Survey	·	2.6 km	MPC; JPL
618116	2006 WH_{21}	—	November 17, 2006	Mount Lemmon	Mount Lemmon Survey	·	1.6 km	MPC; JPL
618117	2006 WB_{25}	—	November 17, 2006	Mount Lemmon	Mount Lemmon Survey	·	1.6 km	MPC; JPL
618118	2006 WZ_{28}	—	October 21, 2006	Mount Lemmon	Mount Lemmon Survey	·	1.6 km	MPC; JPL
618119	2006 WJ_{34}	—	October 23, 2006	Mount Lemmon	Mount Lemmon Survey	WIT	800 m	MPC; JPL
618120	2006 WV_{34}	—	November 16, 2006	Kitt Peak	Spacewatch	WIT	840 m	MPC; JPL
618121	2006 WN_{47}	—	November 16, 2006	Kitt Peak	Spacewatch	·	1.6 km	MPC; JPL
618122	2006 WB_{54}	—	November 16, 2006	Kitt Peak	Spacewatch	·	1.4 km	MPC; JPL
618123	2006 WO_{65}	—	November 17, 2006	Mount Lemmon	Mount Lemmon Survey	·	630 m	MPC; JPL
618124	2006 WG_{67}	—	November 17, 2006	Mount Lemmon	Mount Lemmon Survey	·	3.0 km	MPC; JPL
618125	2006 WB_{77}	—	November 18, 2006	Kitt Peak	Spacewatch	·	1.3 km	MPC; JPL
618126	2006 WG_{91}	—	February 21, 2017	Haleakala	Pan-STARRS 1	·	1.4 km	MPC; JPL
618127	2006 WH_{91}	—	November 19, 2006	Kitt Peak	Spacewatch	·	910 m	MPC; JPL
618128	2006 WT_{100}	—	September 30, 2006	Mount Lemmon	Mount Lemmon Survey	·	570 m	MPC; JPL
618129	2006 WK_{110}	—	November 19, 2006	Kitt Peak	Spacewatch	·	1.7 km	MPC; JPL
618130	2006 WU_{113}	—	November 20, 2006	Kitt Peak	Spacewatch	·	1.2 km	MPC; JPL
618131	2006 WP_{118}	—	November 20, 2006	Mount Lemmon	Mount Lemmon Survey	·	1.1 km	MPC; JPL
618132 Verheyen	2006 WS_{129}	Verheyen	November 27, 2006	Uccle	P. De Cat	·	2.2 km	MPC; JPL
618133	2006 WP_{133}	—	October 13, 2006	Kitt Peak	Spacewatch	·	1.1 km	MPC; JPL
618134	2006 WM_{137}	—	November 19, 2006	Kitt Peak	Spacewatch	·	1.1 km	MPC; JPL
618135	2006 WV_{144}	—	October 23, 2006	Mount Lemmon	Mount Lemmon Survey	·	650 m	MPC; JPL
618136	2006 WX_{146}	—	November 20, 2006	Kitt Peak	Spacewatch	·	890 m	MPC; JPL
618137	2006 WC_{157}	—	November 22, 2006	Catalina	CSS	EUN	1.3 km	MPC; JPL
618138	2006 WY_{175}	—	November 23, 2006	Kitt Peak	Spacewatch	·	680 m	MPC; JPL
618139	2006 WH_{191}	—	April 17, 2013	Haleakala	Pan-STARRS 1	·	1.2 km	MPC; JPL
618140	2006 WP_{199}	—	November 24, 2006	Kitt Peak	Spacewatch	·	1.1 km	MPC; JPL
618141	2006 WH_{202}	—	November 22, 2006	Kitt Peak	Spacewatch	·	1.4 km	MPC; JPL
618142	2006 WT_{208}	—	November 17, 2006	Mount Lemmon	Mount Lemmon Survey	·	810 m	MPC; JPL
618143	2006 WX_{210}	—	April 1, 2008	Kitt Peak	Spacewatch	·	700 m	MPC; JPL
618144	2006 WH_{214}	—	December 27, 2011	Mount Lemmon	Mount Lemmon Survey	·	1.2 km	MPC; JPL
618145	2006 WK_{217}	—	May 20, 2015	Mount Lemmon	Mount Lemmon Survey	·	660 m	MPC; JPL
618146	2006 WP_{223}	—	December 11, 2013	Haleakala	Pan-STARRS 1	·	660 m	MPC; JPL
618147	2006 WC_{224}	—	October 7, 2016	Haleakala	Pan-STARRS 1	·	500 m	MPC; JPL
618148	2006 WA_{226}	—	November 24, 2006	Mount Lemmon	Mount Lemmon Survey	·	1.4 km	MPC; JPL
618149	2006 WP_{228}	—	January 19, 2012	Mount Lemmon	Mount Lemmon Survey	·	1.2 km	MPC; JPL
618150	2006 WR_{228}	—	January 26, 2011	Kitt Peak	Spacewatch	·	620 m	MPC; JPL
618151	2006 WR_{233}	—	November 16, 2006	Kitt Peak	Spacewatch	·	540 m	MPC; JPL
618152	2006 WU_{233}	—	November 16, 2006	Kitt Peak	Spacewatch	·	480 m	MPC; JPL
618153	2006 XC_{3}	—	November 21, 2006	Catalina	CSS	·	840 m	MPC; JPL
618154	2006 XN_{30}	—	December 13, 2006	Mount Lemmon	Mount Lemmon Survey	BAR	1.2 km	MPC; JPL
618155	2006 XP_{59}	—	December 14, 2006	Kitt Peak	Spacewatch	·	1.3 km	MPC; JPL
618156	2006 XM_{72}	—	December 15, 2006	Kitt Peak	Spacewatch	·	1.7 km	MPC; JPL
618157	2006 XB_{75}	—	December 15, 2006	Kitt Peak	Spacewatch	·	860 m	MPC; JPL
618158	2006 XD_{75}	—	October 31, 2010	Mount Lemmon	Mount Lemmon Survey	·	1.5 km	MPC; JPL
618159	2006 XC_{77}	—	May 12, 2016	Haleakala	Pan-STARRS 1	H	360 m	MPC; JPL
618160	2006 XF_{78}	—	December 1, 2006	Mount Lemmon	Mount Lemmon Survey	·	530 m	MPC; JPL
618161	2006 YN_{4}	—	December 16, 2006	Mount Lemmon	Mount Lemmon Survey	HNS	1.0 km	MPC; JPL
618162	2006 YX_{13}	—	December 22, 2006	Bergisch Gladbach	W. Bickel	(2076)	850 m	MPC; JPL
618163	2006 YE_{20}	—	March 13, 2003	Kitt Peak	Spacewatch	·	1.5 km	MPC; JPL
618164	2006 YA_{22}	—	December 21, 2006	Kitt Peak	Spacewatch	·	600 m	MPC; JPL
618165	2006 YT_{27}	—	December 21, 2006	Kitt Peak	Spacewatch	·	1.6 km	MPC; JPL
618166	2006 YL_{45}	—	December 21, 2006	Kitt Peak	Spacewatch	·	680 m	MPC; JPL
618167	2006 YG_{58}	—	December 15, 2006	Kitt Peak	Spacewatch	·	1.6 km	MPC; JPL
618168	2006 YY_{58}	—	October 2, 2011	Piszkéstető	K. Sárneczky	·	3.0 km	MPC; JPL
618169	2006 YX_{61}	—	December 24, 2006	Kitt Peak	Spacewatch	·	620 m	MPC; JPL
618170	2006 YY_{65}	—	October 14, 2010	Mount Lemmon	Mount Lemmon Survey	DOR	1.6 km	MPC; JPL
618171	2007 AO_{1}	—	January 9, 2007	Kitt Peak	Spacewatch	H	540 m	MPC; JPL
618172	2007 AZ_{32}	—	January 10, 2007	Mount Lemmon	Mount Lemmon Survey	·	670 m	MPC; JPL
618173	2007 AO_{35}	—	January 10, 2007	Mount Lemmon	Mount Lemmon Survey	·	1.3 km	MPC; JPL
618174	2007 BM_{1}	—	January 16, 2007	Catalina	CSS	MAS	690 m	MPC; JPL
618175	2007 BE_{16}	—	January 17, 2007	Kitt Peak	Spacewatch	·	910 m	MPC; JPL
618176	2007 BA_{37}	—	January 8, 2007	Mount Lemmon	Mount Lemmon Survey	·	1.1 km	MPC; JPL
618177	2007 BQ_{39}	—	January 24, 2007	Mount Lemmon	Mount Lemmon Survey	·	1.7 km	MPC; JPL
618178	2007 BW_{49}	—	January 27, 2007	Mount Lemmon	Mount Lemmon Survey	·	2.2 km	MPC; JPL
618179	2007 BX_{50}	—	January 24, 2007	Kitt Peak	Spacewatch	·	1.8 km	MPC; JPL
618180	2007 BK_{51}	—	January 24, 2007	Kitt Peak	Spacewatch	AGN	940 m	MPC; JPL
618181	2007 BA_{59}	—	January 17, 2007	Kitt Peak	Spacewatch	·	780 m	MPC; JPL
618182	2007 BU_{59}	—	December 27, 2006	Mount Lemmon	Mount Lemmon Survey	(5)	930 m	MPC; JPL
618183	2007 BN_{78}	—	January 25, 2007	Kitt Peak	Spacewatch	·	730 m	MPC; JPL
618184	2007 BL_{80}	—	January 17, 2007	Kitt Peak	Spacewatch	AGN	1.0 km	MPC; JPL
618185	2007 BU_{84}	—	January 19, 2007	Mauna Kea	P. A. Wiegert	HOF	2.0 km	MPC; JPL
618186	2007 BM_{89}	—	January 19, 2007	Mauna Kea	P. A. Wiegert	AGN	790 m	MPC; JPL
618187	2007 BU_{90}	—	January 19, 2007	Mauna Kea	P. A. Wiegert	(2076)	620 m	MPC; JPL
618188	2007 BU_{99}	—	January 24, 2007	Mount Lemmon	Mount Lemmon Survey	(7744)	1.4 km	MPC; JPL
618189	2007 BE_{103}	—	January 28, 2007	Mount Lemmon	Mount Lemmon Survey	·	760 m	MPC; JPL
618190	2007 BR_{105}	—	January 29, 2007	Kitt Peak	Spacewatch	(5)	1.0 km	MPC; JPL
618191	2007 BZ_{107}	—	January 10, 2007	Kitt Peak	Spacewatch	·	670 m	MPC; JPL
618192	2007 BZ_{108}	—	December 10, 2015	Mount Lemmon	Mount Lemmon Survey	·	1.8 km	MPC; JPL
618193	2007 BA_{111}	—	January 10, 2007	Kitt Peak	Spacewatch	·	710 m	MPC; JPL
618194	2007 BO_{111}	—	March 14, 2011	Mount Lemmon	Mount Lemmon Survey	·	890 m	MPC; JPL
618195	2007 BX_{111}	—	January 29, 2007	Kitt Peak	Spacewatch	V	450 m	MPC; JPL
618196	2007 BK_{113}	—	July 2, 2008	Kitt Peak	Spacewatch	·	730 m	MPC; JPL
618197	2007 BL_{114}	—	January 25, 2007	Kitt Peak	Spacewatch	·	3.9 km	MPC; JPL
618198	2007 BS_{114}	—	January 27, 2007	Mount Lemmon	Mount Lemmon Survey	·	1.3 km	MPC; JPL
618199	2007 BV_{114}	—	January 26, 2007	Kitt Peak	Spacewatch	HNS	880 m	MPC; JPL
618200	2007 BE_{115}	—	January 27, 2007	Kitt Peak	Spacewatch	HNS	1 km	MPC; JPL

== 618201–618300 ==
back to top

Designation			Discovery			Properties		Ref
Permanent	Provisional	Named after	Date	Site	Discoverer(s)	Category	Diam.	Ref
618201	2007 BN_{117}	—	January 29, 2007	Kitt Peak	Spacewatch	·	1.5 km	MPC; JPL
618202	2007 CN	—	November 21, 2006	Mount Lemmon	Mount Lemmon Survey	PHO	1.4 km	MPC; JPL
618203	2007 CL_{10}	—	January 25, 2007	Kitt Peak	Spacewatch	·	850 m	MPC; JPL
618204	2007 CH_{18}	—	February 8, 2007	Mount Lemmon	Mount Lemmon Survey	MAS	500 m	MPC; JPL
618205	2007 CE_{20}	—	January 15, 2007	Catalina	CSS	BAR	970 m	MPC; JPL
618206	2007 CX_{36}	—	January 27, 2007	Kitt Peak	Spacewatch	·	1.7 km	MPC; JPL
618207	2007 CB_{42}	—	October 13, 2001	Palomar	NEAT	·	1.8 km	MPC; JPL
618208	2007 CX_{82}	—	June 7, 2016	Haleakala	Pan-STARRS 1	·	2.9 km	MPC; JPL
618209	2007 CJ_{83}	—	January 21, 2014	Kitt Peak	Spacewatch	(2076)	700 m	MPC; JPL
618210	2007 CU_{83}	—	February 13, 2007	Mount Lemmon	Mount Lemmon Survey	·	720 m	MPC; JPL
618211	2007 DD_{6}	—	February 17, 2007	Kitt Peak	Spacewatch	·	760 m	MPC; JPL
618212	2007 DH_{7}	—	February 17, 2007	Kitt Peak	Spacewatch	NYS	1.0 km	MPC; JPL
618213	2007 DC_{14}	—	February 6, 2007	Mount Lemmon	Mount Lemmon Survey	WIT	920 m	MPC; JPL
618214	2007 DL_{56}	—	February 21, 2007	Mount Lemmon	Mount Lemmon Survey	·	810 m	MPC; JPL
618215	2007 DO_{62}	—	February 21, 2007	Kitt Peak	Spacewatch	·	2.0 km	MPC; JPL
618216	2007 DU_{75}	—	February 21, 2007	Kitt Peak	Spacewatch	·	1.8 km	MPC; JPL
618217	2007 DH_{80}	—	February 23, 2007	Mount Lemmon	Mount Lemmon Survey	·	2.0 km	MPC; JPL
618218	2007 DV_{83}	—	February 25, 2007	Anderson Mesa	LONEOS	·	1.0 km	MPC; JPL
618219	2007 DR_{120}	—	April 12, 2012	Haleakala	Pan-STARRS 1	AGN	980 m	MPC; JPL
618220	2007 DM_{121}	—	February 25, 2007	Kitt Peak	Spacewatch	·	1.6 km	MPC; JPL
618221	2007 DH_{122}	—	October 4, 2014	Mount Lemmon	Mount Lemmon Survey	·	1.8 km	MPC; JPL
618222	2007 DK_{122}	—	February 17, 2007	Kitt Peak	Spacewatch	615	1.0 km	MPC; JPL
618223	2007 DV_{123}	—	February 23, 2007	Kitt Peak	Spacewatch	·	610 m	MPC; JPL
618224	2007 DT_{128}	—	February 21, 2007	Kitt Peak	Spacewatch	L5	6.0 km	MPC; JPL
618225	2007 DM_{129}	—	February 21, 2007	Mount Lemmon	Mount Lemmon Survey	·	630 m	MPC; JPL
618226	2007 DY_{129}	—	February 23, 2007	Mount Lemmon	Mount Lemmon Survey	·	1.2 km	MPC; JPL
618227	2007 DH_{130}	—	February 25, 2007	Mount Lemmon	Mount Lemmon Survey	MAS	580 m	MPC; JPL
618228	2007 DK_{130}	—	February 23, 2007	Mount Lemmon	Mount Lemmon Survey	V	480 m	MPC; JPL
618229	2007 DU_{130}	—	February 21, 2007	Mount Lemmon	Mount Lemmon Survey	·	1.8 km	MPC; JPL
618230	2007 EW_{46}	—	March 9, 2007	Mount Lemmon	Mount Lemmon Survey	·	860 m	MPC; JPL
618231	2007 EJ_{61}	—	March 10, 2007	Kitt Peak	Spacewatch	MAS	580 m	MPC; JPL
618232	2007 EO_{80}	—	January 27, 2007	Mount Lemmon	Mount Lemmon Survey	NYS	890 m	MPC; JPL
618233	2007 EN_{85}	—	March 12, 2007	Mount Lemmon	Mount Lemmon Survey	·	1.3 km	MPC; JPL
618234	2007 EW_{96}	—	March 10, 2007	Mount Lemmon	Mount Lemmon Survey	·	980 m	MPC; JPL
618235	2007 EF_{129}	—	March 9, 2007	Mount Lemmon	Mount Lemmon Survey	·	810 m	MPC; JPL
618236	2007 EA_{130}	—	March 9, 2007	Mount Lemmon	Mount Lemmon Survey	·	860 m	MPC; JPL
618237	2007 EW_{150}	—	February 26, 2007	Mount Lemmon	Mount Lemmon Survey	·	840 m	MPC; JPL
618238	2007 EP_{178}	—	March 14, 2007	Kitt Peak	Spacewatch	·	1.5 km	MPC; JPL
618239	2007 EF_{179}	—	March 14, 2007	Kitt Peak	Spacewatch	·	930 m	MPC; JPL
618240	2007 EE_{184}	—	March 12, 2007	Mount Lemmon	Mount Lemmon Survey	·	1.6 km	MPC; JPL
618241	2007 EG_{201}	—	March 13, 2007	Mauna Kea	D. D. Balam, K. M. Perrett	·	3.1 km	MPC; JPL
618242	2007 EY_{216}	—	February 6, 2007	Kitt Peak	Spacewatch	MAS	530 m	MPC; JPL
618243	2007 EG_{226}	—	March 14, 2007	Mount Lemmon	Mount Lemmon Survey	V	640 m	MPC; JPL
618244	2007 EZ_{226}	—	March 11, 2007	Mount Lemmon	Mount Lemmon Survey	·	1.4 km	MPC; JPL
618245	2007 EJ_{228}	—	September 23, 2008	Mount Lemmon	Mount Lemmon Survey	·	950 m	MPC; JPL
618246	2007 EN_{228}	—	September 17, 2009	Kitt Peak	Spacewatch	·	1.4 km	MPC; JPL
618247	2007 EW_{229}	—	March 9, 2007	Mount Lemmon	Mount Lemmon Survey	·	1.9 km	MPC; JPL
618248	2007 EU_{232}	—	December 27, 2006	Mount Lemmon	Mount Lemmon Survey	·	800 m	MPC; JPL
618249	2007 EX_{232}	—	September 6, 2008	Kitt Peak	Spacewatch	·	830 m	MPC; JPL
618250	2007 EQ_{234}	—	March 10, 2007	Mount Lemmon	Mount Lemmon Survey	L5	6.6 km	MPC; JPL
618251	2007 EK_{235}	—	September 3, 2013	Haleakala	Pan-STARRS 1	·	1.6 km	MPC; JPL
618252	2007 EE_{236}	—	March 11, 2007	Kitt Peak	Spacewatch	·	920 m	MPC; JPL
618253	2007 EO_{238}	—	March 12, 2007	Kitt Peak	Spacewatch	NYS	750 m	MPC; JPL
618254	2007 ER_{238}	—	March 9, 2007	Kitt Peak	Spacewatch	L5	6.5 km	MPC; JPL
618255	2007 EX_{240}	—	March 11, 2007	Mount Lemmon	Mount Lemmon Survey	·	780 m	MPC; JPL
618256	2007 FW_{13}	—	March 12, 2007	Catalina	CSS	·	870 m	MPC; JPL
618257	2007 FB_{47}	—	March 20, 2007	Mount Lemmon	Mount Lemmon Survey	·	910 m	MPC; JPL
618258	2007 FT_{61}	—	March 26, 2007	Mount Lemmon	Mount Lemmon Survey	L5	6.8 km	MPC; JPL
618259	2007 FX_{61}	—	March 26, 2007	Kitt Peak	Spacewatch	·	800 m	MPC; JPL
618260	2007 GA_{11}	—	February 25, 2007	Mount Lemmon	Mount Lemmon Survey	·	770 m	MPC; JPL
618261	2007 GG_{26}	—	April 14, 2007	Mount Lemmon	Mount Lemmon Survey	L5	6.0 km	MPC; JPL
618262	2007 GU_{35}	—	March 13, 2007	Mount Lemmon	Mount Lemmon Survey	·	870 m	MPC; JPL
618263	2007 GA_{44}	—	April 14, 2007	Mount Lemmon	Mount Lemmon Survey	·	790 m	MPC; JPL
618264	2007 GZ_{45}	—	April 14, 2007	Kitt Peak	Spacewatch	·	650 m	MPC; JPL
618265	2007 GD_{55}	—	April 15, 2007	Kitt Peak	Spacewatch	V	560 m	MPC; JPL
618266	2007 GK_{56}	—	April 15, 2007	Kitt Peak	Spacewatch	·	2.1 km	MPC; JPL
618267	2007 GX_{56}	—	April 15, 2007	Kitt Peak	Spacewatch	·	1.0 km	MPC; JPL
618268	2007 GM_{61}	—	April 15, 2007	Kitt Peak	Spacewatch	·	790 m	MPC; JPL
618269	2007 GS_{64}	—	April 15, 2007	Kitt Peak	Spacewatch	·	940 m	MPC; JPL
618270	2007 GA_{69}	—	April 15, 2007	Mount Lemmon	Mount Lemmon Survey	L5	6.8 km	MPC; JPL
618271	2007 GJ_{78}	—	September 6, 2008	Mount Lemmon	Mount Lemmon Survey	·	1.8 km	MPC; JPL
618272	2007 GK_{78}	—	October 25, 2016	Haleakala	Pan-STARRS 1	·	1.5 km	MPC; JPL
618273	2007 GQ_{79}	—	January 8, 2010	Mount Lemmon	Mount Lemmon Survey	PHO	780 m	MPC; JPL
618274	2007 HV_{2}	—	March 26, 2007	Mount Lemmon	Mount Lemmon Survey	·	1.1 km	MPC; JPL
618275	2007 HY_{5}	—	March 26, 2007	Mount Lemmon	Mount Lemmon Survey	·	770 m	MPC; JPL
618276	2007 HK_{10}	—	March 10, 2007	Mount Lemmon	Mount Lemmon Survey	·	790 m	MPC; JPL
618277	2007 HM_{11}	—	April 18, 2007	Mount Lemmon	Mount Lemmon Survey	MAS	520 m	MPC; JPL
618278	2007 HX_{16}	—	August 23, 2004	Kitt Peak	Spacewatch	·	840 m	MPC; JPL
618279	2007 HF_{17}	—	April 16, 2007	Catalina	CSS	·	1.2 km	MPC; JPL
618280	2007 HZ_{29}	—	March 15, 2007	Kitt Peak	Spacewatch	·	870 m	MPC; JPL
618281	2007 HM_{41}	—	April 20, 2007	Kitt Peak	Spacewatch	·	960 m	MPC; JPL
618282	2007 HU_{44}	—	March 26, 2007	Mount Lemmon	Mount Lemmon Survey	MAS	560 m	MPC; JPL
618283	2007 HO_{69}	—	March 25, 2007	Mount Lemmon	Mount Lemmon Survey	L5	10 km	MPC; JPL
618284	2007 HV_{74}	—	April 22, 2007	Mount Lemmon	Mount Lemmon Survey	PHO	910 m	MPC; JPL
618285	2007 HN_{77}	—	April 23, 2007	Kitt Peak	Spacewatch	NYS	1.0 km	MPC; JPL
618286	2007 HK_{89}	—	April 23, 2007	Catalina	CSS	·	1.0 km	MPC; JPL
618287	2007 HG_{93}	—	October 10, 2015	Haleakala	Pan-STARRS 1	·	490 m	MPC; JPL
618288	2007 HS_{100}	—	April 26, 2007	Mount Lemmon	Mount Lemmon Survey	L5	8.3 km	MPC; JPL
618289	2007 HJ_{101}	—	September 17, 2012	Mount Lemmon	Mount Lemmon Survey	L5	7.3 km	MPC; JPL
618290	2007 HC_{104}	—	April 22, 2007	Kitt Peak	Spacewatch	MAS	570 m	MPC; JPL
618291	2007 HF_{104}	—	November 9, 2008	Kitt Peak	Spacewatch	MAS	650 m	MPC; JPL
618292	2007 HY_{104}	—	October 7, 2008	Mount Lemmon	Mount Lemmon Survey	V	550 m	MPC; JPL
618293	2007 HE_{106}	—	February 26, 2011	Mount Lemmon	Mount Lemmon Survey	·	1.6 km	MPC; JPL
618294	2007 HC_{107}	—	February 28, 2014	Haleakala	Pan-STARRS 1	·	780 m	MPC; JPL
618295	2007 HQ_{107}	—	September 15, 2012	Mount Lemmon	Mount Lemmon Survey	L5	7.4 km	MPC; JPL
618296	2007 HN_{108}	—	January 29, 2014	Kitt Peak	Spacewatch	·	990 m	MPC; JPL
618297	2007 HH_{112}	—	April 22, 2007	Mount Lemmon	Mount Lemmon Survey	NYS	820 m	MPC; JPL
618298	2007 HY_{112}	—	April 16, 2007	Mount Lemmon	Mount Lemmon Survey	KOR	1 km	MPC; JPL
618299	2007 HT_{114}	—	April 23, 2007	Mount Lemmon	Mount Lemmon Survey	·	790 m	MPC; JPL
618300	2007 JQ_{31}	—	May 12, 2007	Mount Lemmon	Mount Lemmon Survey	·	1.3 km	MPC; JPL

== 618301–618400 ==
back to top

Designation			Discovery			Properties		Ref
Permanent	Provisional	Named after	Date	Site	Discoverer(s)	Category	Diam.	Ref
618301	2007 JF_{34}	—	May 9, 2007	Mount Lemmon	Mount Lemmon Survey	·	970 m	MPC; JPL
618302	2007 JN_{36}	—	January 23, 2006	Kitt Peak	Spacewatch	·	2.2 km	MPC; JPL
618303	2007 JK_{51}	—	May 9, 2007	Mount Lemmon	Mount Lemmon Survey	MAS	500 m	MPC; JPL
618304	2007 KG_{6}	—	May 24, 2007	Mount Lemmon	Mount Lemmon Survey	·	900 m	MPC; JPL
618305	2007 KQ_{11}	—	May 25, 2007	Mount Lemmon	Mount Lemmon Survey	·	850 m	MPC; JPL
618306	2007 LL_{1}	—	June 11, 2007	Lake Tekapo	A. C. Gilmore	H	470 m	MPC; JPL
618307	2007 LX_{13}	—	May 11, 2007	Mount Lemmon	Mount Lemmon Survey	·	780 m	MPC; JPL
618308	2007 LQ_{22}	—	June 13, 2007	Kitt Peak	Spacewatch	·	1.0 km	MPC; JPL
618309	2007 LJ_{27}	—	May 10, 2007	Mount Lemmon	Mount Lemmon Survey	·	1.5 km	MPC; JPL
618310	2007 LT_{35}	—	May 12, 2007	Kitt Peak	Spacewatch	·	940 m	MPC; JPL
618311	2007 MK_{5}	—	May 22, 2003	Kitt Peak	Spacewatch	NYS	910 m	MPC; JPL
618312	2007 MZ_{21}	—	June 22, 2007	Kitt Peak	Spacewatch	·	970 m	MPC; JPL
618313	2007 MV_{23}	—	February 7, 2006	Catalina	CSS	·	1.5 km	MPC; JPL
618314	2007 MD_{24}	—	June 20, 2007	La Sagra	OAM	·	1.3 km	MPC; JPL
618315	2007 MA_{26}	—	June 24, 2007	Kitt Peak	Spacewatch	·	1.8 km	MPC; JPL
618316	2007 PZ_{2}	—	August 8, 2007	Socorro	LINEAR	·	1.0 km	MPC; JPL
618317	2007 PD_{46}	—	August 13, 2007	XuYi	PMO NEO Survey Program	·	1.2 km	MPC; JPL
618318	2007 QX_{4}	—	August 31, 2007	Siding Spring	K. Sárneczky, L. Kiss	·	2.2 km	MPC; JPL
618319	2007 QN_{15}	—	August 24, 2007	Kitt Peak	Spacewatch	·	2.1 km	MPC; JPL
618320	2007 RJ_{8}	—	August 10, 2007	Kitt Peak	Spacewatch	EOS	1.5 km	MPC; JPL
618321	2007 RS_{42}	—	September 9, 2007	Kitt Peak	Spacewatch	·	2.5 km	MPC; JPL
618322	2007 RS_{54}	—	September 9, 2007	Kitt Peak	Spacewatch	·	1.3 km	MPC; JPL
618323	2007 RU_{67}	—	September 10, 2007	Kitt Peak	Spacewatch	·	1.9 km	MPC; JPL
618324	2007 RX_{69}	—	August 10, 2007	Kitt Peak	Spacewatch	·	900 m	MPC; JPL
618325	2007 RP_{76}	—	September 26, 2002	Palomar	NEAT	·	1.3 km	MPC; JPL
618326	2007 RX_{78}	—	September 10, 2007	Mount Lemmon	Mount Lemmon Survey	KOR	1.2 km	MPC; JPL
618327	2007 RD_{79}	—	September 10, 2007	Mount Lemmon	Mount Lemmon Survey	·	2.9 km	MPC; JPL
618328	2007 RD_{83}	—	August 10, 2007	Kitt Peak	Spacewatch	·	2.1 km	MPC; JPL
618329	2007 RK_{107}	—	September 11, 2007	Mount Lemmon	Mount Lemmon Survey	·	880 m	MPC; JPL
618330	2007 RK_{158}	—	August 16, 2007	XuYi	PMO NEO Survey Program	·	1.6 km	MPC; JPL
618331	2007 RZ_{188}	—	September 10, 2007	Catalina	CSS	·	1.5 km	MPC; JPL
618332	2007 RB_{194}	—	September 12, 2007	Kitt Peak	Spacewatch	·	1.2 km	MPC; JPL
618333	2007 RP_{215}	—	September 12, 2007	Kitt Peak	Spacewatch	·	2.0 km	MPC; JPL
618334	2007 RB_{236}	—	September 13, 2007	Mount Lemmon	Mount Lemmon Survey	·	1.1 km	MPC; JPL
618335	2007 RU_{250}	—	September 13, 2007	Kitt Peak	Spacewatch	·	2.4 km	MPC; JPL
618336	2007 RU_{259}	—	September 14, 2007	Kitt Peak	Spacewatch	·	1.9 km	MPC; JPL
618337	2007 RB_{260}	—	September 10, 2007	Kitt Peak	Spacewatch	·	2.1 km	MPC; JPL
618338	2007 RC_{260}	—	September 14, 2007	Kitt Peak	Spacewatch	·	2.3 km	MPC; JPL
618339	2007 RF_{262}	—	September 14, 2007	Kitt Peak	Spacewatch	EOS	1.2 km	MPC; JPL
618340	2007 RK_{272}	—	April 12, 2005	Kitt Peak	Deep Ecliptic Survey	·	780 m	MPC; JPL
618341	2007 RZ_{296}	—	September 9, 2007	Mount Lemmon	Mount Lemmon Survey	·	1.7 km	MPC; JPL
618342	2007 RZ_{333}	—	September 11, 2007	Mount Lemmon	Mount Lemmon Survey	·	1.4 km	MPC; JPL
618343	2007 RP_{342}	—	September 13, 2007	Kitt Peak	Spacewatch	·	1.1 km	MPC; JPL
618344	2007 RC_{347}	—	July 29, 2017	Haleakala	Pan-STARRS 1	·	2.0 km	MPC; JPL
618345	2007 RD_{347}	—	January 18, 2009	Kitt Peak	Spacewatch	·	740 m	MPC; JPL
618346	2007 RE_{353}	—	September 10, 2007	Kitt Peak	Spacewatch	·	1 km	MPC; JPL
618347	2007 RQ_{354}	—	September 8, 2007	Anderson Mesa	LONEOS	·	2.2 km	MPC; JPL
618348	2016 PN	—	August 2, 2016	Haleakala	ATLAS	ATE	160 m	MPC; JPL
618349 Williekoorts	2017 SB_{17}	Williekoorts	September 25, 2017	Haleakala	ATLAS	·	790 m	MPC; JPL
618350	2021 PS_{2}	—	August 7, 2021	Mauna Loa	ATLAS	APO · PHA	370 m	MPC; JPL
618351	1994 WZ_{5}	—	November 28, 1994	Kitt Peak	Spacewatch	·	1.9 km	MPC; JPL
618352	1995 OG_{12}	—	July 22, 1995	Kitt Peak	Spacewatch	·	2.1 km	MPC; JPL
618353	1995 SL_{16}	—	September 18, 1995	Kitt Peak	Spacewatch	·	1.5 km	MPC; JPL
618354	1995 SM_{26}	—	September 19, 1995	Kitt Peak	Spacewatch	GEF	800 m	MPC; JPL
618355	1995 SO_{51}	—	September 26, 1995	Kitt Peak	Spacewatch	·	1.5 km	MPC; JPL
618356	1995 TM_{4}	—	October 15, 1995	Kitt Peak	Spacewatch	·	3.0 km	MPC; JPL
618357	1995 US_{40}	—	October 23, 1995	Kitt Peak	Spacewatch	LIX	2.7 km	MPC; JPL
618358	1995 UU_{69}	—	October 19, 1995	Kitt Peak	Spacewatch	·	2.3 km	MPC; JPL
618359	1995 WE_{30}	—	November 19, 1995	Kitt Peak	Spacewatch	·	2.4 km	MPC; JPL
618360	1995 WQ_{44}	—	September 24, 2011	Haleakala	Pan-STARRS 1	·	2.8 km	MPC; JPL
618361	1996 AZ_{7}	—	January 12, 1996	Kitt Peak	Spacewatch	(2076)	710 m	MPC; JPL
618362	1996 FV_{9}	—	March 20, 1996	Kitt Peak	Spacewatch	·	1.1 km	MPC; JPL
618363	1996 RH_{34}	—	July 16, 2013	Haleakala	Pan-STARRS 1	·	1.1 km	MPC; JPL
618364	1996 TU_{69}	—	December 19, 2004	Mount Lemmon	Mount Lemmon Survey	MAS	600 m	MPC; JPL
618365	1996 VB_{20}	—	November 8, 1996	Kitt Peak	Spacewatch	·	640 m	MPC; JPL
618366	1996 VQ_{22}	—	November 9, 1996	Kitt Peak	Spacewatch	·	1.0 km	MPC; JPL
618367	1996 XN_{16}	—	December 4, 1996	Kitt Peak	Spacewatch	·	2.7 km	MPC; JPL
618368	1997 BG_{6}	—	January 31, 1997	Kitt Peak	Spacewatch	·	2.1 km	MPC; JPL
618369	1997 CA_{31}	—	January 17, 2013	Kitt Peak	Spacewatch	·	2.1 km	MPC; JPL
618370	1997 TJ_{9}	—	October 2, 1997	Kitt Peak	Spacewatch	·	2.0 km	MPC; JPL
618371	1997 UG_{12}	—	October 23, 1997	Kitt Peak	Spacewatch	MAS	640 m	MPC; JPL
618372	1997 UO_{12}	—	October 23, 1997	Kitt Peak	Spacewatch	·	920 m	MPC; JPL
618373	1997 WT_{56}	—	November 23, 1997	Kitt Peak	Spacewatch	·	1.4 km	MPC; JPL
618374	1998 DU_{8}	—	February 23, 1998	Kitt Peak	Spacewatch	·	1.5 km	MPC; JPL
618375	1998 HB_{25}	—	April 18, 1998	Kitt Peak	Spacewatch	NYS	1.2 km	MPC; JPL
618376	1998 SG_{180}	—	July 12, 2015	Haleakala	Pan-STARRS 1	V	420 m	MPC; JPL
618377	1998 UK_{2}	—	October 15, 1998	Kitt Peak	Spacewatch	(2076)	600 m	MPC; JPL
618378	1998 UP_{13}	—	October 23, 1998	Kitt Peak	Spacewatch	·	1.2 km	MPC; JPL
618379	1998 VJ_{57}	—	September 13, 2012	Mount Lemmon	Mount Lemmon Survey	KOR	1.3 km	MPC; JPL
618380	1998 XR_{19}	—	December 10, 1998	Kitt Peak	Spacewatch	·	2.4 km	MPC; JPL
618381	1998 YA_{34}	—	August 10, 2012	Kitt Peak	Spacewatch	·	1.8 km	MPC; JPL
618382	1999 AW_{26}	—	January 9, 1999	Kitt Peak	Spacewatch	·	1.4 km	MPC; JPL
618383	1999 AA_{34}	—	January 15, 1999	Kitt Peak	Spacewatch	·	1.1 km	MPC; JPL
618384	1999 AZ_{39}	—	January 10, 1999	Kitt Peak	Spacewatch	EOS	1.5 km	MPC; JPL
618385	1999 CH_{160}	—	November 10, 2006	Kitt Peak	Spacewatch	·	1.0 km	MPC; JPL
618386	1999 EE_{14}	—	March 10, 1999	Kitt Peak	Spacewatch	HNS	1.2 km	MPC; JPL
618387	1999 FB_{98}	—	October 20, 2012	Haleakala	Pan-STARRS 1	·	2.6 km	MPC; JPL
618388	1999 FK_{99}	—	November 26, 2012	Mount Lemmon	Mount Lemmon Survey	·	800 m	MPC; JPL
618389	1999 RE_{250}	—	September 7, 1999	Kitt Peak	Spacewatch	·	660 m	MPC; JPL
618390	1999 RW_{250}	—	September 5, 1999	Kitt Peak	Spacewatch	·	3.0 km	MPC; JPL
618391	1999 RQ_{260}	—	September 28, 2003	Kitt Peak	Spacewatch	NYS	800 m	MPC; JPL
618392	1999 ST_{20}	—	September 30, 1999	Kitt Peak	Spacewatch	·	600 m	MPC; JPL
618393	1999 SF_{29}	—	September 18, 2003	Kitt Peak	Spacewatch	·	1.2 km	MPC; JPL
618394	1999 TR_{52}	—	October 5, 1999	Kitt Peak	Spacewatch	AGN	920 m	MPC; JPL
618395	1999 TJ_{58}	—	October 6, 1999	Kitt Peak	Spacewatch	AGN	1.2 km	MPC; JPL
618396	1999 TM_{69}	—	October 9, 1999	Kitt Peak	Spacewatch	·	1.0 km	MPC; JPL
618397	1999 TD_{277}	—	October 6, 1999	Socorro	LINEAR	NYS	900 m	MPC; JPL
618398	1999 TR_{298}	—	October 2, 1999	Kitt Peak	Spacewatch	·	2.2 km	MPC; JPL
618399	1999 TE_{305}	—	September 14, 1994	Kitt Peak	Spacewatch	·	1.9 km	MPC; JPL
618400	1999 TV_{338}	—	March 1, 2008	Kitt Peak	Spacewatch	·	2.7 km	MPC; JPL

== 618401–618500 ==
back to top

Designation			Discovery			Properties		Ref
Permanent	Provisional	Named after	Date	Site	Discoverer(s)	Category	Diam.	Ref
618401	1999 TD_{340}	—	October 21, 2016	Mount Lemmon	Mount Lemmon Survey	·	550 m	MPC; JPL
618402	1999 TG_{341}	—	August 31, 2017	Mount Lemmon	Mount Lemmon Survey	H	320 m	MPC; JPL
618403	1999 VX_{214}	—	November 1, 1999	Kitt Peak	Spacewatch	·	2.0 km	MPC; JPL
618404	1999 WD_{22}	—	November 17, 1999	Kitt Peak	Spacewatch	KOR	1.3 km	MPC; JPL
618405	1999 XN_{266}	—	September 23, 2008	Kitt Peak	Spacewatch	AGN	1.1 km	MPC; JPL
618406	1999 YP_{23}	—	December 16, 1999	Kitt Peak	Spacewatch	KOR	1.3 km	MPC; JPL
618407	1999 YY_{29}	—	May 27, 2006	Catalina	CSS	H	440 m	MPC; JPL
618408	2000 AL_{223}	—	January 9, 2000	Kitt Peak	Spacewatch	·	670 m	MPC; JPL
618409	2000 CA_{127}	—	February 1, 2000	Kitt Peak	Spacewatch	·	510 m	MPC; JPL
618410	2000 CU_{138}	—	February 5, 2000	Kitt Peak	Spacewatch	KOR	1.3 km	MPC; JPL
618411	2000 CP_{139}	—	February 3, 2000	Kitt Peak	Spacewatch	·	2.3 km	MPC; JPL
618412	2000 CO_{153}	—	August 25, 2012	Mount Lemmon	Mount Lemmon Survey	·	540 m	MPC; JPL
618413	2000 CF_{155}	—	January 26, 2012	Mount Lemmon	Mount Lemmon Survey	MAR	660 m	MPC; JPL
618414	2000 ES_{15}	—	March 3, 2000	Kitt Peak	Spacewatch	·	1.2 km	MPC; JPL
618415	2000 ET_{160}	—	January 28, 2000	Kitt Peak	Spacewatch	·	1.2 km	MPC; JPL
618416	2000 EM_{209}	—	August 22, 2014	Haleakala	Pan-STARRS 1	·	960 m	MPC; JPL
618417	2000 EE_{210}	—	February 27, 2008	Mount Lemmon	Mount Lemmon Survey	H	420 m	MPC; JPL
618418	2000 GD_{118}	—	April 2, 2000	Kitt Peak	Spacewatch	EUN	950 m	MPC; JPL
618419	2000 GU_{129}	—	April 5, 2000	Kitt Peak	Spacewatch	·	1.2 km	MPC; JPL
618420	2000 HJ_{99}	—	April 25, 2000	Kitt Peak	Spacewatch	·	1.4 km	MPC; JPL
618421	2000 KG_{84}	—	May 24, 2000	Mauna Kea	C. Veillet, D. D. Balam	·	680 m	MPC; JPL
618422	2000 LO_{29}	—	June 4, 2000	Haleakala	NEAT	·	1.5 km	MPC; JPL
618423	2000 OO_{8}	—	July 23, 2000	Socorro	LINEAR	JUN	1.2 km	MPC; JPL
618424	2000 OC_{70}	—	July 28, 2011	Haleakala	Pan-STARRS 1	·	2.2 km	MPC; JPL
618425	2000 OL_{70}	—	December 4, 2005	Kitt Peak	Spacewatch	NYS	990 m	MPC; JPL
618426	2000 OP_{71}	—	August 31, 2011	Haleakala	Pan-STARRS 1	·	2.3 km	MPC; JPL
618427	2000 OK_{72}	—	January 10, 2007	Kitt Peak	Spacewatch	·	1.0 km	MPC; JPL
618428	2000 OG_{73}	—	November 19, 2008	Mount Lemmon	Mount Lemmon Survey	NYS	770 m	MPC; JPL
618429	2000 PR_{33}	—	February 9, 2016	Haleakala	Pan-STARRS 1	·	1.2 km	MPC; JPL
618430	2000 QK_{241}	—	August 26, 2000	Cerro Tololo	Deep Ecliptic Survey	·	1.7 km	MPC; JPL
618431	2000 QL_{257}	—	August 28, 2000	Cerro Tololo	Deep Ecliptic Survey	URS	2.8 km	MPC; JPL
618432	2000 QF_{258}	—	August 26, 2012	Haleakala	Pan-STARRS 1	L5	6.5 km	MPC; JPL
618433	2000 QT_{258}	—	October 4, 2013	Mount Lemmon	Mount Lemmon Survey	L5	7.3 km	MPC; JPL
618434	2000 QV_{260}	—	August 25, 2000	Cerro Tololo	Deep Ecliptic Survey	·	2.4 km	MPC; JPL
618435	2000 RB_{109}	—	October 19, 2006	Mount Lemmon	Mount Lemmon Survey	·	1.4 km	MPC; JPL
618436	2000 RE_{109}	—	February 2, 2008	Mount Lemmon	Mount Lemmon Survey	·	2.1 km	MPC; JPL
618437	2000 RT_{109}	—	October 15, 2004	Kitt Peak	Spacewatch	NYS	700 m	MPC; JPL
618438	2000 RC_{110}	—	November 17, 2014	Mount Lemmon	Mount Lemmon Survey	·	1.2 km	MPC; JPL
618439	2000 RN_{111}	—	December 30, 2013	Mount Lemmon	Mount Lemmon Survey	·	2.3 km	MPC; JPL
618440	2000 RQ_{112}	—	July 15, 2013	Haleakala	Pan-STARRS 1	(17392)	1.1 km	MPC; JPL
618441	2000 SS_{377}	—	December 18, 2007	Mount Lemmon	Mount Lemmon Survey	·	2.8 km	MPC; JPL
618442	2000 SB_{379}	—	March 13, 2010	Kitt Peak	Spacewatch	MAS	680 m	MPC; JPL
618443	2000 SE_{379}	—	January 9, 2014	Catalina	CSS	·	2.9 km	MPC; JPL
618444	2000 SK_{382}	—	April 1, 2008	Kitt Peak	Spacewatch	L5	7.5 km	MPC; JPL
618445	2000 SE_{383}	—	February 28, 2008	Kitt Peak	Spacewatch	·	2.2 km	MPC; JPL
618446	2000 SZ_{384}	—	October 14, 2017	Mount Lemmon	Mount Lemmon Survey	·	2.2 km	MPC; JPL
618447	2000 TW_{59}	—	October 2, 2000	Socorro	LINEAR	·	1.5 km	MPC; JPL
618448	2000 TS_{75}	—	September 30, 2006	Catalina	CSS	·	2.5 km	MPC; JPL
618449	2000 TC_{79}	—	March 12, 2007	Kitt Peak	Spacewatch	L5	9.1 km	MPC; JPL
618450	2000 TB_{80}	—	September 21, 2011	Mount Lemmon	Mount Lemmon Survey	·	2.6 km	MPC; JPL
618451	2000 TD_{80}	—	September 18, 2009	Kitt Peak	Spacewatch	EUN	930 m	MPC; JPL
618452	2000 TE_{80}	—	August 7, 2016	Haleakala	Pan-STARRS 1	VER	2.3 km	MPC; JPL
618453	2000 WW_{198}	—	November 22, 2006	Kitt Peak	Spacewatch	URS	2.7 km	MPC; JPL
618454	2000 WX_{198}	—	July 11, 2016	Haleakala	Pan-STARRS 1	EOS	1.7 km	MPC; JPL
618455	2000 WP_{199}	—	February 8, 2008	Kitt Peak	Spacewatch	·	2.6 km	MPC; JPL
618456	2000 WA_{200}	—	February 13, 2008	Kitt Peak	Spacewatch	ELF	2.6 km	MPC; JPL
618457	2000 WC_{200}	—	September 29, 2017	Haleakala	Pan-STARRS 1	·	2.3 km	MPC; JPL
618458	2000 WQ_{201}	—	November 17, 2011	Kitt Peak	Spacewatch	MAS	460 m	MPC; JPL
618459	2000 WX_{204}	—	December 10, 2006	Kitt Peak	Spacewatch	·	2.5 km	MPC; JPL
618460	2000 XS_{55}	—	April 11, 2003	Kitt Peak	Spacewatch	·	2.9 km	MPC; JPL
618461	2000 YO_{146}	—	January 19, 2005	Kitt Peak	Spacewatch	NYS	840 m	MPC; JPL
618462	2000 YP_{146}	—	January 18, 2015	Haleakala	Pan-STARRS 1	·	1.6 km	MPC; JPL
618463	2001 BG_{84}	—	October 22, 2006	Mount Lemmon	Mount Lemmon Survey	·	600 m	MPC; JPL
618464	2001 DE_{111}	—	February 16, 2015	Haleakala	Pan-STARRS 1	TIN	970 m	MPC; JPL
618465	2001 DL_{112}	—	September 5, 2008	Kitt Peak	Spacewatch	·	2.2 km	MPC; JPL
618466	2001 FN_{200}	—	October 18, 2008	Kitt Peak	Spacewatch	KOR	960 m	MPC; JPL
618467	2001 FG_{235}	—	March 25, 2001	Kitt Peak	Deep Ecliptic Survey	KOR	990 m	MPC; JPL
618468	2001 FH_{244}	—	March 24, 2006	Mount Lemmon	Mount Lemmon Survey	KOR	1.1 km	MPC; JPL
618469	2001 FD_{246}	—	April 6, 2011	Mount Lemmon	Mount Lemmon Survey	·	2.2 km	MPC; JPL
618470	2001 FA_{248}	—	August 2, 2016	Haleakala	Pan-STARRS 1	·	3.2 km	MPC; JPL
618471	2001 JN_{11}	—	April 7, 2006	Kitt Peak	Spacewatch	·	1.9 km	MPC; JPL
618472	2001 KU_{77}	—	September 20, 2009	Mount Lemmon	Mount Lemmon Survey	·	850 m	MPC; JPL
618473	2001 KR_{79}	—	November 30, 2003	Kitt Peak	Spacewatch	KOR	1.3 km	MPC; JPL
618474	2001 KY_{79}	—	December 14, 2010	Mount Lemmon	Mount Lemmon Survey	·	1.1 km	MPC; JPL
618475	2001 KM_{80}	—	October 27, 2008	Kitt Peak	Spacewatch	KOR	1.2 km	MPC; JPL
618476	2001 KO_{81}	—	August 10, 2007	Kitt Peak	Spacewatch	KOR	1.2 km	MPC; JPL
618477	2001 KJ_{82}	—	September 26, 1995	Kitt Peak	Spacewatch	·	510 m	MPC; JPL
618478	2001 KV_{88}	—	January 31, 2016	Mount Lemmon	Mount Lemmon Survey	HNS	1.0 km	MPC; JPL
618479	2001 OO_{29}	—	June 27, 2001	Palomar	NEAT	·	830 m	MPC; JPL
618480	2001 OO_{41}	—	July 21, 2001	Palomar	NEAT	·	2.0 km	MPC; JPL
618481	2001 OK_{69}	—	July 19, 2001	Palomar	NEAT	·	2.0 km	MPC; JPL
618482	2001 PO_{10}	—	June 30, 2001	Palomar	NEAT	·	1.3 km	MPC; JPL
618483	2001 PV_{67}	—	April 12, 2013	Haleakala	Pan-STARRS 1	·	1.5 km	MPC; JPL
618484	2001 QR_{87}	—	August 14, 2001	Haleakala	NEAT	·	710 m	MPC; JPL
618485	2001 QL_{89}	—	August 16, 2001	Palomar	NEAT	·	1.6 km	MPC; JPL
618486	2001 QE_{111}	—	August 23, 2001	Socorro	LINEAR	BAR	1.2 km	MPC; JPL
618487	2001 QJ_{141}	—	July 25, 2001	Haleakala	NEAT	(5)	1.2 km	MPC; JPL
618488	2001 QW_{276}	—	August 19, 2001	Socorro	LINEAR	·	1.2 km	MPC; JPL
618489	2001 QR_{307}	—	August 19, 2001	Cerro Tololo	Deep Ecliptic Survey	·	2.0 km	MPC; JPL
618490	2001 QG_{309}	—	August 19, 2001	Cerro Tololo	Deep Ecliptic Survey	·	1.9 km	MPC; JPL
618491	2001 QW_{336}	—	June 8, 2016	Haleakala	Pan-STARRS 1	·	1.8 km	MPC; JPL
618492	2001 QE_{337}	—	August 24, 2001	Kitt Peak	Spacewatch	·	1.4 km	MPC; JPL
618493	2001 RT_{112}	—	August 27, 2001	Kitt Peak	Spacewatch	·	450 m	MPC; JPL
618494	2001 RL_{157}	—	November 22, 2014	Haleakala	Pan-STARRS 1	·	1.0 km	MPC; JPL
618495	2001 RU_{157}	—	February 19, 2014	Kitt Peak	Spacewatch	EOS	1.6 km	MPC; JPL
618496	2001 SB_{93}	—	September 20, 2001	Socorro	LINEAR	·	1.1 km	MPC; JPL
618497	2001 SX_{98}	—	September 20, 2001	Socorro	LINEAR	·	860 m	MPC; JPL
618498	2001 SG_{99}	—	September 20, 2001	Socorro	LINEAR	MAR	950 m	MPC; JPL
618499	2001 SP_{201}	—	September 19, 2001	Socorro	LINEAR	·	1.2 km	MPC; JPL
618500	2001 SO_{203}	—	September 19, 2001	Socorro	LINEAR	MAR	980 m	MPC; JPL

== 618501–618600 ==
back to top

Designation			Discovery			Properties		Ref
Permanent	Provisional	Named after	Date	Site	Discoverer(s)	Category	Diam.	Ref
618501	2001 SL_{275}	—	September 21, 2001	Kitt Peak	Spacewatch	·	990 m	MPC; JPL
618502	2001 SG_{299}	—	September 20, 2001	Socorro	LINEAR	·	1.0 km	MPC; JPL
618503	2001 SH_{303}	—	September 20, 2001	Socorro	LINEAR	·	1.1 km	MPC; JPL
618504	2001 SB_{309}	—	September 22, 2001	Socorro	LINEAR	EOS	2.0 km	MPC; JPL
618505	2001 SA_{329}	—	September 19, 2001	Socorro	LINEAR	·	1.6 km	MPC; JPL
618506	2001 SF_{354}	—	September 18, 2001	Apache Point	SDSS Collaboration	·	2.2 km	MPC; JPL
618507	2001 SP_{357}	—	October 9, 2008	Kitt Peak	Spacewatch	·	960 m	MPC; JPL
618508	2001 SX_{358}	—	November 7, 2010	Charleston	R. Holmes	·	1.4 km	MPC; JPL
618509	2001 SZ_{361}	—	November 22, 2014	Haleakala	Pan-STARRS 1	(194)	1.0 km	MPC; JPL
618510	2001 SY_{363}	—	December 25, 2010	Mount Lemmon	Mount Lemmon Survey	·	1.3 km	MPC; JPL
618511	2001 TO_{89}	—	October 14, 2001	Socorro	LINEAR	EOS	1.9 km	MPC; JPL
618512	2001 TO_{140}	—	October 10, 2001	Palomar	NEAT	·	1.3 km	MPC; JPL
618513	2001 TW_{142}	—	October 10, 2001	Palomar	NEAT	·	1.3 km	MPC; JPL
618514	2001 TM_{167}	—	October 15, 2001	Socorro	LINEAR	·	1.1 km	MPC; JPL
618515	2001 TY_{173}	—	September 28, 2001	Palomar	NEAT	·	1.4 km	MPC; JPL
618516	2001 TP_{177}	—	October 14, 2001	Socorro	LINEAR	·	1.4 km	MPC; JPL
618517	2001 TX_{183}	—	October 14, 2001	Socorro	LINEAR	·	1.9 km	MPC; JPL
618518	2001 TJ_{185}	—	October 14, 2001	Socorro	LINEAR	·	1.3 km	MPC; JPL
618519	2001 TX_{206}	—	October 11, 2001	Palomar	NEAT	·	780 m	MPC; JPL
618520	2001 TH_{260}	—	October 14, 2001	Apache Point	SDSS Collaboration	·	1.1 km	MPC; JPL
618521	2001 TC_{263}	—	October 23, 2001	Kitt Peak	Spacewatch	·	670 m	MPC; JPL
618522	2001 TL_{263}	—	February 10, 2014	Haleakala	Pan-STARRS 1	·	2.8 km	MPC; JPL
618523	2001 TA_{264}	—	February 22, 2009	Kitt Peak	Spacewatch	·	2.7 km	MPC; JPL
618524	2001 TY_{264}	—	November 5, 2007	Mount Lemmon	Mount Lemmon Survey	EOS	1.7 km	MPC; JPL
618525	2001 TK_{265}	—	March 17, 2015	Haleakala	Pan-STARRS 1	·	2.1 km	MPC; JPL
618526	2001 TW_{265}	—	October 14, 2001	Apache Point	SDSS Collaboration	·	1.5 km	MPC; JPL
618527	2001 TB_{266}	—	July 30, 2017	Haleakala	Pan-STARRS 1	·	2.3 km	MPC; JPL
618528	2001 TJ_{266}	—	October 13, 2001	Kitt Peak	Spacewatch	·	830 m	MPC; JPL
618529	2001 TL_{267}	—	July 24, 2015	Haleakala	Pan-STARRS 1	V	490 m	MPC; JPL
618530	2001 TM_{268}	—	January 12, 2015	Haleakala	Pan-STARRS 1	L5	6.8 km	MPC; JPL
618531	2001 TJ_{269}	—	October 15, 2001	Palomar	NEAT	·	920 m	MPC; JPL
618532	2001 TK_{269}	—	October 10, 2001	Kitt Peak	Spacewatch	·	2.3 km	MPC; JPL
618533	2001 TW_{269}	—	October 14, 2001	Apache Point	SDSS Collaboration	·	1.8 km	MPC; JPL
618534	2001 UB_{38}	—	October 14, 2001	Kitt Peak	Spacewatch	·	800 m	MPC; JPL
618535	2001 US_{63}	—	October 18, 2001	Socorro	LINEAR	·	1.7 km	MPC; JPL
618536	2001 UN_{90}	—	October 11, 2001	Kitt Peak	Spacewatch	·	2.8 km	MPC; JPL
618537	2001 UC_{133}	—	October 17, 2001	Socorro	LINEAR	·	890 m	MPC; JPL
618538	2001 UL_{138}	—	October 23, 2001	Socorro	LINEAR	L5	8.8 km	MPC; JPL
618539	2001 UF_{176}	—	October 25, 2001	Kitt Peak	Spacewatch	·	1.4 km	MPC; JPL
618540	2001 UZ_{176}	—	October 15, 2001	Kitt Peak	Spacewatch	·	900 m	MPC; JPL
618541	2001 UV_{199}	—	October 21, 2001	Socorro	LINEAR	(5)	1.7 km	MPC; JPL
618542	2001 UU_{200}	—	October 21, 2001	Socorro	LINEAR	EOS	2.3 km	MPC; JPL
618543	2001 UL_{224}	—	October 23, 2001	Palomar	NEAT	·	3.0 km	MPC; JPL
618544	2001 UJ_{232}	—	November 9, 2013	Haleakala	Pan-STARRS 1	EOS	2.2 km	MPC; JPL
618545	2001 UZ_{235}	—	October 21, 2001	Kitt Peak	Spacewatch	·	2.5 km	MPC; JPL
618546	2001 UX_{236}	—	July 30, 2017	Haleakala	Pan-STARRS 1	EOS	1.6 km	MPC; JPL
618547	2001 UA_{238}	—	October 17, 2001	Kitt Peak	Spacewatch	·	1.6 km	MPC; JPL
618548	2001 UJ_{239}	—	October 3, 2013	Haleakala	Pan-STARRS 1	L5	7.4 km	MPC; JPL
618549	2001 VD	—	October 23, 2001	Palomar	NEAT	·	1.4 km	MPC; JPL
618550	2001 WA_{4}	—	November 17, 2001	Kitt Peak	Spacewatch	·	2.2 km	MPC; JPL
618551	2001 WF_{13}	—	November 17, 2001	Socorro	LINEAR	·	2.6 km	MPC; JPL
618552	2001 WN_{46}	—	November 19, 2001	Socorro	LINEAR	TIR	2.6 km	MPC; JPL
618553	2001 WR_{74}	—	November 20, 2001	Socorro	LINEAR	THM	2.3 km	MPC; JPL
618554	2001 WW_{93}	—	November 20, 2001	Socorro	LINEAR	·	2.1 km	MPC; JPL
618555	2001 WB_{106}	—	June 15, 2015	Haleakala	Pan-STARRS 1	·	3.1 km	MPC; JPL
618556	2001 WG_{106}	—	January 5, 2013	Kitt Peak	Spacewatch	THM	1.8 km	MPC; JPL
618557	2001 XW_{76}	—	November 17, 2001	Socorro	LINEAR	·	950 m	MPC; JPL
618558	2001 XP_{102}	—	November 18, 2001	Socorro	LINEAR	H	480 m	MPC; JPL
618559	2001 XC_{247}	—	December 15, 2001	Socorro	LINEAR	JUN	770 m	MPC; JPL
618560	2001 XL_{269}	—	January 6, 2002	Haleakala	NEAT	(1547)	1.2 km	MPC; JPL
618561	2001 YP_{9}	—	December 17, 2001	Socorro	LINEAR	·	1.5 km	MPC; JPL
618562	2001 YP_{29}	—	December 18, 2001	Socorro	LINEAR	·	1.5 km	MPC; JPL
618563	2001 YT_{30}	—	December 18, 2001	Socorro	LINEAR	·	810 m	MPC; JPL
618564	2001 YN_{55}	—	December 18, 2001	Socorro	LINEAR	·	2.5 km	MPC; JPL
618565	2001 YG_{149}	—	December 19, 2001	Palomar	NEAT	·	850 m	MPC; JPL
618566	2001 YY_{162}	—	July 13, 2016	Haleakala	Pan-STARRS 1	·	3.0 km	MPC; JPL
618567	2001 YJ_{163}	—	August 7, 2016	Haleakala	Pan-STARRS 1	·	2.3 km	MPC; JPL
618568	2001 YN_{163}	—	February 12, 2008	Mount Lemmon	Mount Lemmon Survey	·	2.3 km	MPC; JPL
618569	2001 YR_{164}	—	July 14, 2013	Haleakala	Pan-STARRS 1	·	1.4 km	MPC; JPL
618570	2001 YY_{164}	—	September 4, 2011	Haleakala	Pan-STARRS 1	·	2.5 km	MPC; JPL
618571	2001 YV_{165}	—	December 20, 2001	Kitt Peak	Spacewatch	·	2.1 km	MPC; JPL
618572	2002 AJ_{34}	—	January 12, 2002	Kitt Peak	Spacewatch	·	2.8 km	MPC; JPL
618573	2002 AR_{146}	—	January 13, 2002	Kitt Peak	Spacewatch	TIR	2.2 km	MPC; JPL
618574	2002 AE_{176}	—	January 12, 2002	Palomar	NEAT	·	2.4 km	MPC; JPL
618575	2002 AW_{209}	—	January 9, 2002	Apache Point	SDSS Collaboration	·	1.3 km	MPC; JPL
618576	2002 AT_{211}	—	March 13, 2007	Mount Lemmon	Mount Lemmon Survey	·	1.2 km	MPC; JPL
618577	2002 AO_{212}	—	February 6, 2013	Kitt Peak	Spacewatch	·	860 m	MPC; JPL
618578	2002 AZ_{212}	—	August 1, 2016	Haleakala	Pan-STARRS 1	·	2.2 km	MPC; JPL
618579	2002 AK_{213}	—	February 25, 2006	Kitt Peak	Spacewatch	·	860 m	MPC; JPL
618580	2002 AM_{214}	—	November 1, 2005	Mount Lemmon	Mount Lemmon Survey	·	1.4 km	MPC; JPL
618581	2002 AZ_{214}	—	January 9, 2002	Apache Point	SDSS	·	2.8 km	MPC; JPL
618582	2002 AR_{215}	—	February 28, 2008	Mount Lemmon	Mount Lemmon Survey	·	2.6 km	MPC; JPL
618583	2002 BJ_{33}	—	February 10, 2008	Mount Lemmon	Mount Lemmon Survey	·	2.1 km	MPC; JPL
618584	2002 CG_{50}	—	February 7, 2002	Socorro	LINEAR	·	1.5 km	MPC; JPL
618585	2002 CH_{124}	—	January 13, 2002	Bergisch Gladbach	W. Bickel	·	1.4 km	MPC; JPL
618586	2002 CY_{148}	—	February 10, 2002	Socorro	LINEAR	·	1.1 km	MPC; JPL
618587	2002 CK_{160}	—	January 14, 2002	Palomar	NEAT	·	2.0 km	MPC; JPL
618588	2002 CR_{255}	—	February 7, 2002	Socorro	LINEAR	EUP	2.8 km	MPC; JPL
618589	2002 CE_{262}	—	February 9, 2002	Kitt Peak	Spacewatch	·	3.2 km	MPC; JPL
618590	2002 CD_{278}	—	February 7, 2002	Palomar	NEAT	·	1.0 km	MPC; JPL
618591	2002 CC_{282}	—	February 8, 2002	Kitt Peak	Spacewatch	·	1.0 km	MPC; JPL
618592	2002 CK_{318}	—	March 16, 2007	Kitt Peak	Spacewatch	·	2.3 km	MPC; JPL
618593	2002 CC_{319}	—	October 29, 2006	Catalina	CSS	·	2.9 km	MPC; JPL
618594	2002 CH_{319}	—	February 8, 2002	Kitt Peak	Spacewatch	HNS	1.0 km	MPC; JPL
618595	2002 CV_{319}	—	September 4, 2011	Haleakala	Pan-STARRS 1	·	2.2 km	MPC; JPL
618596	2002 CC_{320}	—	July 5, 2016	Haleakala	Pan-STARRS 1	·	2.7 km	MPC; JPL
618597	2002 CX_{320}	—	February 13, 2002	Apache Point	SDSS Collaboration	·	2.2 km	MPC; JPL
618598	2002 CJ_{323}	—	April 15, 2012	Haleakala	Pan-STARRS 1	·	650 m	MPC; JPL
618599	2002 CD_{324}	—	September 30, 2017	Haleakala	Pan-STARRS 1	·	2.4 km	MPC; JPL
618600	2002 CF_{324}	—	January 29, 2011	Kitt Peak	Spacewatch	·	1.6 km	MPC; JPL

== 618601–618700 ==
back to top

Designation			Discovery			Properties		Ref
Permanent	Provisional	Named after	Date	Site	Discoverer(s)	Category	Diam.	Ref
618601	2002 CL_{328}	—	February 12, 2002	Kitt Peak	Spacewatch	·	790 m	MPC; JPL
618602	2002 DA	—	February 16, 2002	Ondřejov	P. Pravec, P. Kušnirák	·	3.2 km	MPC; JPL
618603	2002 DT_{21}	—	April 21, 2012	Mount Lemmon	Mount Lemmon Survey	·	1.5 km	MPC; JPL
618604	2002 EY_{17}	—	March 5, 2002	Kitt Peak	Spacewatch	·	1.6 km	MPC; JPL
618605	2002 EY_{35}	—	March 9, 2002	Kitt Peak	Spacewatch	·	540 m	MPC; JPL
618606	2002 EY_{95}	—	February 11, 2002	Socorro	LINEAR	·	1.2 km	MPC; JPL
618607	2002 EH_{147}	—	March 15, 2002	Kitt Peak	Spacewatch	H	500 m	MPC; JPL
618608	2002 EP_{156}	—	March 10, 2002	Cima Ekar	ADAS	·	480 m	MPC; JPL
618609	2002 EC_{165}	—	April 4, 2008	Mount Lemmon	Mount Lemmon Survey	·	3.4 km	MPC; JPL
618610	2002 EW_{165}	—	February 28, 2008	Kitt Peak	Spacewatch	·	3.1 km	MPC; JPL
618611	2002 EM_{166}	—	February 9, 2002	Kitt Peak	Spacewatch	NYS	1.3 km	MPC; JPL
618612	2002 ET_{166}	—	April 9, 2006	Kitt Peak	Spacewatch	·	920 m	MPC; JPL
618613	2002 EE_{167}	—	April 28, 2012	Mount Lemmon	Mount Lemmon Survey	·	1.8 km	MPC; JPL
618614	2002 EL_{167}	—	January 15, 2013	Nogales	M. Schwartz, P. R. Holvorcem	·	2.3 km	MPC; JPL
618615	2002 EJ_{170}	—	March 13, 2008	Kitt Peak	Spacewatch	LUT	2.9 km	MPC; JPL
618616	2002 FC_{44}	—	December 22, 2008	Kitt Peak	Spacewatch	·	740 m	MPC; JPL
618617	2002 GD_{30}	—	April 7, 2002	Cerro Tololo	Deep Ecliptic Survey	PAD	1.4 km	MPC; JPL
618618	2002 GO_{181}	—	April 2, 2002	Palomar	NEAT	·	2.1 km	MPC; JPL
618619	2002 GA_{184}	—	April 19, 2002	Kitt Peak	Spacewatch	·	2.3 km	MPC; JPL
618620	2002 GA_{190}	—	October 9, 2004	Kitt Peak	Spacewatch	·	3.2 km	MPC; JPL
618621	2002 KU_{16}	—	June 5, 2002	Kitt Peak	Spacewatch	·	630 m	MPC; JPL
618622	2002 LL_{61}	—	June 7, 2002	Palomar	NEAT	·	1.7 km	MPC; JPL
618623	2002 LN_{63}	—	June 1, 2002	Palomar	NEAT	·	2.2 km	MPC; JPL
618624	2002 PY_{9}	—	August 5, 2002	Palomar	NEAT	·	510 m	MPC; JPL
618625	2002 PJ_{80}	—	July 9, 2002	Socorro	LINEAR	·	1.3 km	MPC; JPL
618626	2002 PZ_{167}	—	August 11, 2002	Palomar	NEAT	·	720 m	MPC; JPL
618627	2002 PY_{193}	—	October 11, 2002	Apache Point	SDSS	·	900 m	MPC; JPL
618628	2002 PK_{194}	—	June 18, 2010	Mount Lemmon	Mount Lemmon Survey	·	1.1 km	MPC; JPL
618629	2002 QY_{64}	—	August 18, 2002	Palomar	NEAT	MAR	1.1 km	MPC; JPL
618630	2002 QC_{81}	—	August 29, 2002	Palomar	NEAT	·	960 m	MPC; JPL
618631	2002 QO_{81}	—	August 30, 2002	Palomar	NEAT	·	1.0 km	MPC; JPL
618632	2002 QF_{86}	—	August 17, 2002	Palomar	NEAT	·	2.0 km	MPC; JPL
618633	2002 QE_{99}	—	August 19, 2002	Palomar	NEAT	·	2.7 km	MPC; JPL
618634	2002 QX_{101}	—	August 26, 2002	Palomar	NEAT	·	2.1 km	MPC; JPL
618635	2002 QE_{108}	—	August 17, 2002	Palomar	NEAT	HNS	1.2 km	MPC; JPL
618636	2002 QY_{145}	—	August 3, 2002	Palomar	NEAT	·	1.6 km	MPC; JPL
618637	2002 QX_{155}	—	October 18, 2009	Mount Lemmon	Mount Lemmon Survey	·	590 m	MPC; JPL
618638	2002 QU_{157}	—	August 30, 2006	Anderson Mesa	LONEOS	·	750 m	MPC; JPL
618639	2002 QR_{158}	—	March 24, 2015	Mount Lemmon	Mount Lemmon Survey	KOR	1.3 km	MPC; JPL
618640	2002 RW_{148}	—	September 11, 2002	Palomar	NEAT	·	900 m	MPC; JPL
618641	2002 RL_{152}	—	September 12, 2002	Palomar	NEAT	·	880 m	MPC; JPL
618642	2002 RL_{153}	—	September 12, 2002	Palomar	NEAT	·	2.6 km	MPC; JPL
618643	2002 RG_{164}	—	September 12, 1994	Kitt Peak	Spacewatch	·	820 m	MPC; JPL
618644	2002 RC_{265}	—	September 15, 2002	Palomar	NEAT	·	2.1 km	MPC; JPL
618645	2002 RF_{274}	—	September 4, 2002	Palomar	NEAT	·	1.5 km	MPC; JPL
618646	2002 RB_{278}	—	September 4, 2002	Palomar	NEAT	·	820 m	MPC; JPL
618647	2002 RS_{283}	—	September 4, 2002	Palomar	NEAT	·	2.2 km	MPC; JPL
618648	2002 RU_{286}	—	September 11, 2002	Palomar	NEAT	·	2.1 km	MPC; JPL
618649	2002 RE_{298}	—	February 26, 2008	Mount Lemmon	Mount Lemmon Survey	·	890 m	MPC; JPL
618650	2002 SZ_{10}	—	September 27, 2002	Palomar	NEAT	·	600 m	MPC; JPL
618651	2002 SN_{64}	—	September 28, 2002	Palomar	NEAT	H	430 m	MPC; JPL
618652	2002 SP_{65}	—	September 16, 2002	Palomar	NEAT	·	670 m	MPC; JPL
618653	2002 SF_{67}	—	October 30, 2002	Apache Point	SDSS Collaboration	·	2.0 km	MPC; JPL
618654	2002 TL_{102}	—	October 4, 2002	Socorro	LINEAR	·	990 m	MPC; JPL
618655	2002 TH_{125}	—	October 4, 2002	Palomar	NEAT	·	520 m	MPC; JPL
618656	2002 TB_{150}	—	October 5, 2002	Palomar	NEAT	·	480 m	MPC; JPL
618657	2002 TC_{219}	—	September 28, 2002	Palomar	NEAT	·	1.7 km	MPC; JPL
618658	2002 TS_{381}	—	September 25, 2006	Mount Lemmon	Mount Lemmon Survey	·	720 m	MPC; JPL
618659	2002 TZ_{387}	—	October 15, 2002	Palomar	NEAT	·	2.1 km	MPC; JPL
618660	2002 TT_{388}	—	November 25, 2002	Palomar	NEAT	·	1.3 km	MPC; JPL
618661	2002 TQ_{391}	—	October 9, 2002	Kitt Peak	Spacewatch	·	860 m	MPC; JPL
618662	2002 TD_{394}	—	August 27, 2006	Kitt Peak	Spacewatch	(5)	840 m	MPC; JPL
618663	2002 UX_{13}	—	October 9, 2002	Anderson Mesa	LONEOS	·	840 m	MPC; JPL
618664	2002 UV_{73}	—	October 31, 2002	Palomar	NEAT	·	970 m	MPC; JPL
618665	2002 UQ_{75}	—	October 19, 2007	Catalina	CSS	H	360 m	MPC; JPL
618666	2002 UP_{79}	—	September 18, 2007	Catalina	CSS	·	2.9 km	MPC; JPL
618667	2002 UJ_{82}	—	October 30, 2002	Kitt Peak	Spacewatch	EOS	1.6 km	MPC; JPL
618668	2002 VD_{148}	—	November 4, 2002	Palomar	NEAT	·	1.1 km	MPC; JPL
618669	2002 VL_{149}	—	November 6, 2002	Haleakala	NEAT	·	690 m	MPC; JPL
618670	2002 VW_{150}	—	October 2, 2006	Mount Lemmon	Mount Lemmon Survey	·	1.6 km	MPC; JPL
618671	2002 VB_{154}	—	March 8, 2008	Mount Lemmon	Mount Lemmon Survey	(5)	1.1 km	MPC; JPL
618672	2002 WJ_{21}	—	November 16, 2002	Palomar	NEAT	·	2.4 km	MPC; JPL
618673	2002 WO_{23}	—	November 24, 2002	Palomar	NEAT	EOS	1.5 km	MPC; JPL
618674	2002 XD_{34}	—	November 7, 2002	Kitt Peak	Deep Ecliptic Survey	EOS	2.1 km	MPC; JPL
618675	2002 XJ_{122}	—	October 22, 1995	Kitt Peak	Spacewatch	·	650 m	MPC; JPL
618676	2002 XA_{123}	—	December 22, 2008	Kitt Peak	Spacewatch	·	2.0 km	MPC; JPL
618677	2003 AF_{95}	—	January 3, 2013	Mount Lemmon	Mount Lemmon Survey	·	480 m	MPC; JPL
618678	2003 AN_{95}	—	December 28, 2013	Kitt Peak	Spacewatch	EOS	1.5 km	MPC; JPL
618679	2003 BM_{33}	—	January 27, 2003	Haleakala	NEAT	·	4.4 km	MPC; JPL
618680	2003 BN_{94}	—	February 9, 2003	Haleakala	NEAT	EUN	1.3 km	MPC; JPL
618681	2003 BZ_{94}	—	January 19, 2012	Oukaïmeden	Z. Benkhaldoun	·	2.0 km	MPC; JPL
618682	2003 BF_{95}	—	August 31, 2011	Haleakala	Pan-STARRS 1	EOS	1.6 km	MPC; JPL
618683	2003 BL_{96}	—	December 3, 2007	Kitt Peak	Spacewatch	·	2.4 km	MPC; JPL
618684	2003 BM_{96}	—	March 16, 2012	Haleakala	Pan-STARRS 1	HNS	1.1 km	MPC; JPL
618685	2003 BH_{97}	—	September 16, 2010	Mount Lemmon	Mount Lemmon Survey	(5)	930 m	MPC; JPL
618686	2003 BZ_{97}	—	April 23, 2015	Haleakala	Pan-STARRS 1	EOS	1.6 km	MPC; JPL
618687	2003 BX_{99}	—	February 26, 2014	Mount Lemmon	Mount Lemmon Survey	·	2.0 km	MPC; JPL
618688	2003 BL_{102}	—	January 12, 2016	Haleakala	Pan-STARRS 1	·	1.5 km	MPC; JPL
618689	2003 BQ_{103}	—	April 23, 2014	Mount Lemmon	Mount Lemmon Survey	·	570 m	MPC; JPL
618690	2003 CP_{12}	—	February 4, 2003	Socorro	LINEAR	TIR	3.0 km	MPC; JPL
618691	2003 CV_{24}	—	February 1, 2003	Palomar	NEAT	·	3.3 km	MPC; JPL
618692	2003 CM_{25}	—	February 2, 2003	Palomar	NEAT	·	1.2 km	MPC; JPL
618693	2003 CB_{26}	—	February 9, 2003	Palomar	NEAT	·	2.4 km	MPC; JPL
618694 Gertrudegrice	2003 CV_{26}	Gertrudegrice	January 23, 2012	Mayhill	Falla, N.	·	2.2 km	MPC; JPL
618695	2003 CT_{27}	—	May 21, 2015	Haleakala	Pan-STARRS 1	·	2.4 km	MPC; JPL
618696	2003 CK_{28}	—	February 6, 2003	Kitt Peak	Spacewatch	·	1.6 km	MPC; JPL
618697	2003 DG_{21}	—	February 26, 2003	Socorro	LINEAR	·	1.7 km	MPC; JPL
618698	2003 DS_{25}	—	February 23, 2003	Campo Imperatore	CINEOS	·	1.2 km	MPC; JPL
618699	2003 EN_{1}	—	February 12, 2003	Haleakala	NEAT	·	1.7 km	MPC; JPL
618700	2003 EM_{31}	—	March 7, 2003	Kitt Peak	Spacewatch	HNS	990 m	MPC; JPL

== 618701–618800 ==
back to top

Designation			Discovery			Properties		Ref
Permanent	Provisional	Named after	Date	Site	Discoverer(s)	Category	Diam.	Ref
618701	2003 EN_{63}	—	March 11, 2003	Palomar	NEAT	·	980 m	MPC; JPL
618702	2003 EJ_{64}	—	October 20, 2012	Haleakala	Pan-STARRS 1	·	3.0 km	MPC; JPL
618703	2003 EO_{64}	—	March 6, 2003	Anderson Mesa	LONEOS	H	470 m	MPC; JPL
618704	2003 FN_{35}	—	March 23, 2003	Kitt Peak	Spacewatch	HYG	2.5 km	MPC; JPL
618705	2003 FF_{134}	—	March 29, 2003	Anderson Mesa	LONEOS	H	420 m	MPC; JPL
618706	2003 FN_{134}	—	March 28, 2014	Mount Lemmon	Mount Lemmon Survey	·	2.4 km	MPC; JPL
618707	2003 FS_{134}	—	April 25, 2015	Haleakala	Pan-STARRS 1	·	2.7 km	MPC; JPL
618708	2003 FN_{135}	—	March 23, 2003	Apache Point	SDSS Collaboration	·	1.5 km	MPC; JPL
618709	2003 FE_{136}	—	March 22, 2015	Haleakala	Pan-STARRS 1	·	2.9 km	MPC; JPL
618710	2003 FG_{137}	—	January 27, 2007	Mount Lemmon	Mount Lemmon Survey	·	1.5 km	MPC; JPL
618711	2003 FM_{138}	—	September 17, 2017	Haleakala	Pan-STARRS 1	TIR	2.4 km	MPC; JPL
618712	2003 FT_{139}	—	February 4, 2016	Haleakala	Pan-STARRS 1	·	1.3 km	MPC; JPL
618713	2003 FV_{139}	—	February 28, 2014	Haleakala	Pan-STARRS 1	THM	1.8 km	MPC; JPL
618714	2003 FB_{140}	—	April 1, 2012	Mount Lemmon	Mount Lemmon Survey	·	1.3 km	MPC; JPL
618715	2003 GQ_{11}	—	March 12, 2003	Kitt Peak	Spacewatch	·	960 m	MPC; JPL
618716	2003 GS_{32}	—	April 1, 2003	Cerro Tololo	Deep Lens Survey	EOS	1.5 km	MPC; JPL
618717	2003 GW_{57}	—	February 8, 2008	Mount Lemmon	Mount Lemmon Survey	VER	2.7 km	MPC; JPL
618718	2003 GN_{58}	—	March 12, 2014	Mount Lemmon	Mount Lemmon Survey	·	2.7 km	MPC; JPL
618719	2003 GB_{59}	—	October 12, 2006	Kitt Peak	Spacewatch	·	2.9 km	MPC; JPL
618720	2003 GK_{61}	—	February 18, 2014	Mount Lemmon	Mount Lemmon Survey	·	3.0 km	MPC; JPL
618721	2003 GW_{63}	—	January 17, 2016	Haleakala	Pan-STARRS 1	HNS	950 m	MPC; JPL
618722	2003 GF_{64}	—	September 28, 2011	Mount Lemmon	Mount Lemmon Survey	VER	2.5 km	MPC; JPL
618723	2003 GL_{64}	—	June 18, 2015	Haleakala	Pan-STARRS 1	·	2.3 km	MPC; JPL
618724	2003 HE_{18}	—	October 23, 2006	Mount Lemmon	Mount Lemmon Survey	·	3.6 km	MPC; JPL
618725	2003 HN_{18}	—	April 25, 2003	Kitt Peak	Spacewatch	·	1.1 km	MPC; JPL
618726	2003 HS_{18}	—	April 25, 2003	Kitt Peak	Spacewatch	·	3.0 km	MPC; JPL
618727	2003 HL_{58}	—	April 24, 2003	Kitt Peak	Spacewatch	H	320 m	MPC; JPL
618728	2003 HO_{59}	—	April 21, 2012	Mount Lemmon	Mount Lemmon Survey	HNS	1.3 km	MPC; JPL
618729	2003 HZ_{61}	—	April 28, 2012	Mount Lemmon	Mount Lemmon Survey	HNS	950 m	MPC; JPL
618730	2003 HC_{63}	—	September 23, 2011	Haleakala	Pan-STARRS 1	·	3.2 km	MPC; JPL
618731	2003 JS_{19}	—	June 27, 2011	Kitt Peak	Spacewatch	·	960 m	MPC; JPL
618732	2003 KT_{11}	—	May 26, 2003	Kitt Peak	Spacewatch	·	1.2 km	MPC; JPL
618733	2003 KP_{34}	—	May 29, 2003	Kitt Peak	Spacewatch	·	1.8 km	MPC; JPL
618734	2003 KJ_{37}	—	May 29, 2003	Apache Point	SDSS	H	380 m	MPC; JPL
618735	2003 KN_{40}	—	May 28, 2003	Kitt Peak	Spacewatch	·	2.1 km	MPC; JPL
618736	2003 LX_{9}	—	November 10, 2006	Kitt Peak	Spacewatch	·	2.7 km	MPC; JPL
618737	2003 LA_{10}	—	September 19, 2011	Catalina	CSS	·	1.3 km	MPC; JPL
618738	2003 LY_{10}	—	October 2, 2013	Haleakala	Pan-STARRS 1	·	1.4 km	MPC; JPL
618739	2003 OU_{34}	—	July 24, 2003	Palomar	NEAT	GEF	1.4 km	MPC; JPL
618740	2003 QM_{122}	—	August 24, 2003	Cerro Tololo	Deep Ecliptic Survey	·	1.6 km	MPC; JPL
618741	2003 SN_{19}	—	September 16, 2003	Kitt Peak	Spacewatch	·	2.2 km	MPC; JPL
618742	2003 SK_{102}	—	September 20, 2003	Kitt Peak	Spacewatch	·	2.6 km	MPC; JPL
618743	2003 SW_{113}	—	August 23, 2003	Palomar	NEAT	·	2.0 km	MPC; JPL
618744	2003 SJ_{136}	—	September 19, 2003	Campo Imperatore	CINEOS	·	2.2 km	MPC; JPL
618745	2003 SM_{291}	—	September 29, 2003	Junk Bond	D. Healy	DOR	2.6 km	MPC; JPL
618746	2003 SF_{383}	—	September 26, 2003	Apache Point	SDSS Collaboration	KOR	1.1 km	MPC; JPL
618747	2003 SB_{438}	—	September 28, 2003	Kitt Peak	Spacewatch	·	1.6 km	MPC; JPL
618748	2003 SE_{438}	—	September 27, 2003	Kitt Peak	Spacewatch	GEF	1.2 km	MPC; JPL
618749	2003 SR_{440}	—	January 23, 2006	Kitt Peak	Spacewatch	·	2.3 km	MPC; JPL
618750	2003 SJ_{441}	—	September 27, 2003	Kitt Peak	Spacewatch	·	480 m	MPC; JPL
618751	2003 SM_{441}	—	September 18, 2003	Kitt Peak	Spacewatch	SYL	3.1 km	MPC; JPL
618752	2003 SB_{443}	—	September 17, 2003	Kitt Peak	Spacewatch	HOF	2.0 km	MPC; JPL
618753	2003 SC_{443}	—	April 15, 2012	Haleakala	Pan-STARRS 1	·	620 m	MPC; JPL
618754	2003 SN_{447}	—	September 24, 2008	Kitt Peak	Spacewatch	·	1.7 km	MPC; JPL
618755	2003 SV_{451}	—	September 18, 2003	Kitt Peak	Spacewatch	·	940 m	MPC; JPL
618756	2003 SJ_{452}	—	April 4, 2014	Mount Lemmon	Mount Lemmon Survey	·	3.3 km	MPC; JPL
618757	2003 SE_{455}	—	October 9, 2007	Mount Lemmon	Mount Lemmon Survey	·	900 m	MPC; JPL
618758	2003 SN_{455}	—	January 14, 2016	Haleakala	Pan-STARRS 1	·	1.9 km	MPC; JPL
618759	2003 SK_{464}	—	September 22, 2003	Kitt Peak	Spacewatch	·	1.7 km	MPC; JPL
618760	2003 US_{33}	—	October 17, 2003	Kitt Peak	Spacewatch	·	1.8 km	MPC; JPL
618761	2003 UF_{39}	—	October 16, 2003	Kitt Peak	Spacewatch	·	910 m	MPC; JPL
618762	2003 UB_{74}	—	October 16, 2003	Palomar	NEAT	·	850 m	MPC; JPL
618763	2003 UX_{114}	—	October 20, 2003	Kitt Peak	Spacewatch	·	610 m	MPC; JPL
618764	2003 UO_{128}	—	October 21, 2003	Kitt Peak	Spacewatch	·	1.0 km	MPC; JPL
618765	2003 UA_{217}	—	October 17, 2003	Kitt Peak	Spacewatch	·	850 m	MPC; JPL
618766	2003 UO_{236}	—	October 18, 2003	Haleakala	NEAT	·	1.3 km	MPC; JPL
618767	2003 UY_{262}	—	October 17, 2003	Kitt Peak	Spacewatch	·	500 m	MPC; JPL
618768	2003 UX_{294}	—	October 16, 2003	Kitt Peak	Spacewatch	EOS	1.9 km	MPC; JPL
618769	2003 UG_{295}	—	September 16, 2003	Kitt Peak	Spacewatch	·	1.0 km	MPC; JPL
618770	2003 UB_{306}	—	October 18, 2003	Kitt Peak	Spacewatch	·	1.7 km	MPC; JPL
618771	2003 US_{355}	—	October 19, 2003	Kitt Peak	Spacewatch	·	1.2 km	MPC; JPL
618772	2003 UM_{357}	—	October 19, 2003	Kitt Peak	Spacewatch	·	550 m	MPC; JPL
618773	2003 UB_{406}	—	October 23, 2003	Kitt Peak	Spacewatch	·	640 m	MPC; JPL
618774	2003 UW_{408}	—	October 23, 2003	Apache Point	SDSS Collaboration	·	1.3 km	MPC; JPL
618775	2003 UA_{411}	—	October 23, 2003	Apache Point	SDSS Collaboration	·	1.7 km	MPC; JPL
618776	2003 UU_{411}	—	October 23, 2003	Apache Point	SDSS Collaboration	·	1.7 km	MPC; JPL
618777	2003 UJ_{421}	—	August 10, 2007	Kitt Peak	Spacewatch	KOR	1.1 km	MPC; JPL
618778	2003 UL_{429}	—	October 22, 2003	Kitt Peak	Spacewatch	SYL	3.4 km	MPC; JPL
618779	2003 UC_{436}	—	August 14, 2012	Siding Spring	SSS	·	1.7 km	MPC; JPL
618780	2003 WB_{59}	—	November 18, 2003	Kitt Peak	Spacewatch	·	1.1 km	MPC; JPL
618781	2003 WM_{98}	—	November 24, 2003	Palomar	NEAT	·	1.9 km	MPC; JPL
618782	2003 WA_{154}	—	November 19, 2003	Palomar	NEAT	H	530 m	MPC; JPL
618783	2003 WF_{160}	—	November 30, 2003	Kitt Peak	Spacewatch	·	550 m	MPC; JPL
618784	2003 WW_{160}	—	November 16, 1999	Kitt Peak	Spacewatch	·	940 m	MPC; JPL
618785	2003 WL_{175}	—	November 15, 1998	Kitt Peak	Spacewatch	KOR	1.3 km	MPC; JPL
618786	2003 WS_{197}	—	August 26, 2012	Haleakala	Pan-STARRS 1	L5	6.4 km	MPC; JPL
618787	2003 WY_{200}	—	February 27, 2015	Haleakala	Pan-STARRS 1	KOR	1.1 km	MPC; JPL
618788	2003 WL_{211}	—	March 24, 2015	Mount Lemmon	Mount Lemmon Survey	BRA	1.2 km	MPC; JPL
618789	2003 WR_{211}	—	May 1, 2016	Haleakala	Pan-STARRS 1	·	1.3 km	MPC; JPL
618790	2003 XK_{30}	—	December 1, 2003	Kitt Peak	Spacewatch	NYS	970 m	MPC; JPL
618791	2003 XB_{45}	—	April 29, 2012	Mount Lemmon	Mount Lemmon Survey	·	670 m	MPC; JPL
618792	2003 YP_{7}	—	December 19, 2003	Needville	Dillon, W. G.	·	960 m	MPC; JPL
618793	2003 YB_{46}	—	December 17, 2003	Socorro	LINEAR	PHO	930 m	MPC; JPL
618794	2003 YQ_{140}	—	December 28, 2003	Socorro	LINEAR	·	1.3 km	MPC; JPL
618795	2003 YA_{141}	—	December 17, 2003	Socorro	LINEAR	·	1.5 km	MPC; JPL
618796	2003 YC_{150}	—	December 17, 2003	Socorro	LINEAR	·	2.0 km	MPC; JPL
618797	2003 YP_{183}	—	December 28, 2003	Kitt Peak	Spacewatch	·	980 m	MPC; JPL
618798	2003 YH_{187}	—	January 1, 2009	Mount Lemmon	Mount Lemmon Survey	·	1.9 km	MPC; JPL
618799	2003 YR_{188}	—	December 7, 2015	Haleakala	Pan-STARRS 1	·	1.1 km	MPC; JPL
618800	2003 YZ_{190}	—	December 25, 2003	Apache Point	SDSS Collaboration	BRG	1.2 km	MPC; JPL

== 618801–618900 ==
back to top

Designation			Discovery			Properties		Ref
Permanent	Provisional	Named after	Date	Site	Discoverer(s)	Category	Diam.	Ref
618801	2004 AX_{18}	—	January 15, 2004	Kitt Peak	Spacewatch	RAF	750 m	MPC; JPL
618802	2004 BM_{2}	—	January 16, 2004	Palomar	NEAT	·	2.3 km	MPC; JPL
618803	2004 BB_{164}	—	January 28, 2004	Kitt Peak	Spacewatch	·	1.7 km	MPC; JPL
618804	2004 BZ_{164}	—	January 31, 2004	Apache Point	SDSS Collaboration	·	2.4 km	MPC; JPL
618805	2004 BL_{166}	—	December 29, 2008	Kitt Peak	Spacewatch	TEL	1.1 km	MPC; JPL
618806	2004 BT_{167}	—	January 30, 2004	Kitt Peak	Spacewatch	·	640 m	MPC; JPL
618807	2004 BD_{169}	—	April 26, 2008	Kitt Peak	Spacewatch	·	720 m	MPC; JPL
618808	2004 BD_{173}	—	November 27, 2013	Haleakala	Pan-STARRS 1	·	1.5 km	MPC; JPL
618809	2004 CU_{59}	—	January 18, 2004	Palomar	NEAT	·	2.6 km	MPC; JPL
618810	2004 CK_{63}	—	February 12, 2004	Palomar	NEAT	·	2.1 km	MPC; JPL
618811	2004 CE_{75}	—	January 31, 2004	Kitt Peak	Spacewatch	·	3.2 km	MPC; JPL
618812	2004 CS_{88}	—	February 11, 2004	Kitt Peak	Spacewatch	·	1.7 km	MPC; JPL
618813	2004 CM_{131}	—	July 27, 2005	Palomar	NEAT	·	1.3 km	MPC; JPL
618814	2004 CE_{132}	—	January 24, 2014	Haleakala	Pan-STARRS 1	·	650 m	MPC; JPL
618815	2004 DX_{7}	—	February 17, 2004	Kitt Peak	Spacewatch	THM	2.0 km	MPC; JPL
618816	2004 DW_{52}	—	February 25, 2004	Socorro	LINEAR	·	800 m	MPC; JPL
618817	2004 DA_{61}	—	February 26, 2004	Socorro	LINEAR	·	1.2 km	MPC; JPL
618818	2004 DR_{82}	—	January 10, 2007	Mount Lemmon	Mount Lemmon Survey	·	560 m	MPC; JPL
618819	2004 DK_{83}	—	January 16, 2008	Kitt Peak	Spacewatch	EUN	850 m	MPC; JPL
618820	2004 DO_{86}	—	February 9, 2016	Mount Lemmon	Mount Lemmon Survey	·	1.2 km	MPC; JPL
618821	2004 DK_{89}	—	September 6, 2014	Mount Lemmon	Mount Lemmon Survey	·	930 m	MPC; JPL
618822	2004 DP_{89}	—	February 22, 2004	Kitt Peak	Spacewatch	·	1.7 km	MPC; JPL
618823	2004 EO_{12}	—	February 23, 2004	Socorro	LINEAR	·	570 m	MPC; JPL
618824	2004 EJ_{28}	—	March 15, 2004	Kitt Peak	Spacewatch	·	1.2 km	MPC; JPL
618825	2004 EV_{30}	—	March 15, 2004	Kitt Peak	Spacewatch	·	3.5 km	MPC; JPL
618826	2004 ET_{46}	—	March 15, 2004	Kitt Peak	Spacewatch	·	2.0 km	MPC; JPL
618827	2004 EZ_{92}	—	March 15, 2004	Socorro	LINEAR	PHO	980 m	MPC; JPL
618828	2004 EK_{96}	—	March 10, 2004	Palomar	NEAT	·	850 m	MPC; JPL
618829	2004 EJ_{97}	—	March 15, 2004	Kitt Peak	Spacewatch	·	1.5 km	MPC; JPL
618830	2004 EE_{99}	—	March 15, 2004	Kitt Peak	Spacewatch	·	1.7 km	MPC; JPL
618831	2004 ER_{101}	—	March 15, 2004	Kitt Peak	Spacewatch	EOS	1.5 km	MPC; JPL
618832	2004 EG_{105}	—	March 15, 2004	Kitt Peak	Spacewatch	·	2.4 km	MPC; JPL
618833	2004 EE_{107}	—	March 15, 2004	Kitt Peak	Spacewatch	·	520 m	MPC; JPL
618834	2004 ER_{116}	—	January 24, 2014	Haleakala	Pan-STARRS 1	·	1.5 km	MPC; JPL
618835	2004 FX_{22}	—	February 12, 2004	Palomar	NEAT	EUN	1.3 km	MPC; JPL
618836	2004 FE_{25}	—	March 17, 2004	Kitt Peak	Spacewatch	·	860 m	MPC; JPL
618837	2004 FG_{71}	—	March 17, 2004	Kitt Peak	Spacewatch	EOS	1.5 km	MPC; JPL
618838	2004 FJ_{104}	—	February 26, 2004	Kitt Peak	Deep Ecliptic Survey	·	660 m	MPC; JPL
618839	2004 FO_{114}	—	March 21, 2004	Kitt Peak	Spacewatch	·	670 m	MPC; JPL
618840	2004 FH_{120}	—	March 15, 2004	Kitt Peak	Spacewatch	·	2.0 km	MPC; JPL
618841	2004 FQ_{124}	—	March 27, 2004	Kitt Peak	Spacewatch	EOS	1.6 km	MPC; JPL
618842	2004 FP_{126}	—	March 27, 2004	Socorro	LINEAR	·	530 m	MPC; JPL
618843	2004 FH_{152}	—	March 17, 2004	Kitt Peak	Spacewatch	·	1.9 km	MPC; JPL
618844	2004 FL_{161}	—	February 26, 2004	Kitt Peak	Deep Ecliptic Survey	THM	2.1 km	MPC; JPL
618845	2004 FL_{162}	—	March 18, 2004	Kitt Peak	Spacewatch	·	1.2 km	MPC; JPL
618846	2004 FD_{167}	—	April 25, 2000	Kitt Peak	Spacewatch	EOS	2.3 km	MPC; JPL
618847	2004 FY_{167}	—	March 30, 2004	Kitt Peak	Spacewatch	·	1.6 km	MPC; JPL
618848	2004 FG_{168}	—	March 23, 2004	Kitt Peak	Spacewatch	·	2.5 km	MPC; JPL
618849	2004 FO_{170}	—	April 26, 2000	Kitt Peak	Spacewatch	·	1.2 km	MPC; JPL
618850	2004 FM_{172}	—	February 23, 2012	Mount Lemmon	Mount Lemmon Survey	·	1.6 km	MPC; JPL
618851	2004 GY_{6}	—	February 13, 2004	Kitt Peak	Spacewatch	·	2.4 km	MPC; JPL
618852	2004 GS_{23}	—	June 3, 2000	Kitt Peak	Spacewatch	·	1.5 km	MPC; JPL
618853	2004 GH_{44}	—	March 26, 2004	Kitt Peak	Spacewatch	·	480 m	MPC; JPL
618854	2004 GE_{48}	—	April 12, 2004	Kitt Peak	Spacewatch	HNS	1.1 km	MPC; JPL
618855	2004 GA_{50}	—	February 21, 2009	Kitt Peak	Spacewatch	·	2.3 km	MPC; JPL
618856	2004 GQ_{61}	—	March 16, 2004	Kitt Peak	Spacewatch	·	640 m	MPC; JPL
618857	2004 GO_{88}	—	March 13, 2004	Palomar	NEAT	·	2.3 km	MPC; JPL
618858	2004 GE_{90}	—	November 1, 2006	Mount Lemmon	Mount Lemmon Survey	·	1.7 km	MPC; JPL
618859	2004 GP_{90}	—	December 28, 2011	Mount Lemmon	Mount Lemmon Survey	·	1.4 km	MPC; JPL
618860	2004 GV_{90}	—	March 1, 2009	Mount Lemmon	Mount Lemmon Survey	·	2.7 km	MPC; JPL
618861	2004 GB_{92}	—	October 20, 2006	Kitt Peak	Spacewatch	·	2.3 km	MPC; JPL
618862	2004 HV_{11}	—	March 30, 2004	Kitt Peak	Spacewatch	·	1.3 km	MPC; JPL
618863	2004 HX_{18}	—	March 26, 2004	Socorro	LINEAR	BAR	1.1 km	MPC; JPL
618864	2004 HA_{57}	—	April 27, 2004	Socorro	LINEAR	·	1.5 km	MPC; JPL
618865	2004 HS_{61}	—	April 29, 2004	Haleakala	NEAT	·	1.9 km	MPC; JPL
618866	2004 HT_{70}	—	April 24, 2004	Kitt Peak	Spacewatch	·	2.6 km	MPC; JPL
618867	2004 HJ_{80}	—	April 16, 2004	Apache Point	SDSS Collaboration	PHO	900 m	MPC; JPL
618868	2004 HO_{80}	—	October 16, 2012	Mount Lemmon	Mount Lemmon Survey	·	2.2 km	MPC; JPL
618869	2004 HY_{80}	—	April 28, 2004	Kitt Peak	Spacewatch	·	1.2 km	MPC; JPL
618870	2004 HY_{82}	—	April 23, 2004	Desert Eagle	W. K. Y. Yeung	V	470 m	MPC; JPL
618871	2004 HZ_{82}	—	April 20, 2004	Kitt Peak	Spacewatch	·	700 m	MPC; JPL
618872	2004 HH_{83}	—	September 25, 2006	Kitt Peak	Spacewatch	·	2.8 km	MPC; JPL
618873	2004 HM_{83}	—	April 22, 2004	Apache Point	SDSS Collaboration	·	2.5 km	MPC; JPL
618874	2004 HW_{83}	—	April 20, 2004	Kitt Peak	Spacewatch	EUN	1.0 km	MPC; JPL
618875	2004 HU_{84}	—	February 16, 2015	Haleakala	Pan-STARRS 1	HYG	1.8 km	MPC; JPL
618876	2004 HW_{84}	—	April 28, 2004	Kitt Peak	Spacewatch	·	2.4 km	MPC; JPL
618877	2004 JK_{9}	—	May 13, 2004	Kitt Peak	Spacewatch	·	2.7 km	MPC; JPL
618878	2004 JM_{37}	—	May 13, 2004	Kitt Peak	Spacewatch	·	3.1 km	MPC; JPL
618879	2004 JS_{41}	—	May 15, 2004	Socorro	LINEAR	EUN	1.6 km	MPC; JPL
618880	2004 JP_{48}	—	April 21, 2004	Kitt Peak	Spacewatch	·	500 m	MPC; JPL
618881	2004 JU_{53}	—	May 9, 2004	Kitt Peak	Spacewatch	·	2.0 km	MPC; JPL
618882	2004 JZ_{56}	—	April 2, 2009	Mount Lemmon	Mount Lemmon Survey	·	2.5 km	MPC; JPL
618883	2004 JG_{57}	—	February 20, 2014	Mount Lemmon	Mount Lemmon Survey	·	770 m	MPC; JPL
618884	2004 JH_{58}	—	October 28, 2006	Kitt Peak	Spacewatch	·	2.9 km	MPC; JPL
618885	2004 KZ_{1}	—	April 25, 2004	Kitt Peak	Spacewatch	·	2.0 km	MPC; JPL
618886	2004 KN_{3}	—	May 16, 2004	Socorro	LINEAR	·	1.6 km	MPC; JPL
618887	2004 KL_{20}	—	October 20, 2012	Haleakala	Pan-STARRS 1	·	3.3 km	MPC; JPL
618888	2004 KN_{20}	—	July 5, 2016	Haleakala	Pan-STARRS 1	·	2.9 km	MPC; JPL
618889	2004 LO_{32}	—	June 8, 2016	Haleakala	Pan-STARRS 1	T_{j} (2.99) · (895)	3.1 km	MPC; JPL
618890	2004 LP_{32}	—	July 15, 2013	Haleakala	Pan-STARRS 1	EUN	860 m	MPC; JPL
618891	2004 MB_{8}	—	June 27, 2004	Catalina	CSS	·	1.8 km	MPC; JPL
618892	2004 MQ_{9}	—	July 1, 2008	Kitt Peak	Spacewatch	·	1.9 km	MPC; JPL
618893	2004 MS_{9}	—	January 28, 2014	Catalina	CSS	·	2.9 km	MPC; JPL
618894	2004 MH_{10}	—	January 13, 2016	Haleakala	Pan-STARRS 1	HNS	880 m	MPC; JPL
618895	2004 PO_{2}	—	August 8, 2004	Palomar	NEAT	·	1.6 km	MPC; JPL
618896	2004 PO_{13}	—	August 7, 2004	Palomar	NEAT	·	990 m	MPC; JPL
618897	2004 PL_{118}	—	August 8, 2004	Palomar	NEAT	PHO	750 m	MPC; JPL
618898	2004 PD_{120}	—	October 24, 2005	Kitt Peak	Spacewatch	·	1.2 km	MPC; JPL
618899	2004 QM_{29}	—	August 21, 2004	Siding Spring	SSS	·	530 m	MPC; JPL
618900	2004 QV_{30}	—	September 7, 2008	Mount Lemmon	Mount Lemmon Survey	·	800 m	MPC; JPL

== 618901–619000 ==
back to top

Designation			Discovery			Properties		Ref
Permanent	Provisional	Named after	Date	Site	Discoverer(s)	Category	Diam.	Ref
618901	2004 QP_{31}	—	August 22, 2004	Kitt Peak	Spacewatch	CLO	1.1 km	MPC; JPL
618902	2004 QB_{37}	—	August 25, 2004	Kitt Peak	Spacewatch	·	770 m	MPC; JPL
618903	2004 RT_{24}	—	August 11, 2004	Palomar	NEAT	·	1.1 km	MPC; JPL
618904	2004 RL_{27}	—	September 6, 2004	Palomar	NEAT	GAL	1.6 km	MPC; JPL
618905	2004 RB_{85}	—	September 10, 2004	Socorro	LINEAR	·	1.1 km	MPC; JPL
618906	2004 RH_{88}	—	September 7, 2004	Palomar	NEAT	·	1.4 km	MPC; JPL
618907	2004 RB_{124}	—	September 7, 2004	Palomar	NEAT	·	2.0 km	MPC; JPL
618908	2004 RE_{126}	—	September 7, 2004	Kitt Peak	Spacewatch	V	520 m	MPC; JPL
618909	2004 RP_{129}	—	August 15, 2004	Cerro Tololo	Deep Ecliptic Survey	·	1.8 km	MPC; JPL
618910	2004 RP_{140}	—	September 8, 2004	Socorro	LINEAR	·	1.5 km	MPC; JPL
618911	2004 RJ_{222}	—	September 10, 2004	Kitt Peak	Spacewatch	H	260 m	MPC; JPL
618912	2004 RE_{244}	—	August 13, 2004	Cerro Tololo	Deep Ecliptic Survey	·	1.2 km	MPC; JPL
618913	2004 RC_{245}	—	September 10, 2004	Kitt Peak	Spacewatch	·	730 m	MPC; JPL
618914	2004 RQ_{251}	—	August 13, 2004	Cerro Tololo	Deep Ecliptic Survey	H	430 m	MPC; JPL
618915	2004 RP_{260}	—	September 10, 2004	Kitt Peak	Spacewatch	·	1.6 km	MPC; JPL
618916	2004 RR_{263}	—	September 10, 2004	Kitt Peak	Spacewatch	MAS	520 m	MPC; JPL
618917	2004 RW_{278}	—	September 15, 2004	Kitt Peak	Spacewatch	·	1.4 km	MPC; JPL
618918	2004 RT_{327}	—	September 7, 2004	Palomar	NEAT	·	2.0 km	MPC; JPL
618919	2004 RU_{353}	—	September 12, 2004	Mauna Kea	P. A. Wiegert, S. Popa	NYS	970 m	MPC; JPL
618920	2004 RS_{364}	—	October 28, 2008	Kitt Peak	Spacewatch	MAS	480 m	MPC; JPL
618921	2004 SK_{12}	—	September 14, 2004	Palomar	NEAT	PHO	1.4 km	MPC; JPL
618922	2004 SN_{56}	—	September 13, 2004	Socorro	LINEAR	·	770 m	MPC; JPL
618923	2004 SF_{64}	—	August 13, 2013	Kitt Peak	Spacewatch	AGN	930 m	MPC; JPL
618924	2004 SC_{66}	—	September 17, 2004	Kitt Peak	Spacewatch	·	880 m	MPC; JPL
618925	2004 TR_{3}	—	October 4, 2004	Kitt Peak	Spacewatch	MAS	510 m	MPC; JPL
618926	2004 TZ_{7}	—	October 5, 2004	Goodricke-Pigott	R. A. Tucker	MRX	1.2 km	MPC; JPL
618927	2004 TC_{86}	—	October 5, 2004	Kitt Peak	Spacewatch	·	1.1 km	MPC; JPL
618928	2004 TA_{88}	—	October 5, 2004	Kitt Peak	Spacewatch	·	1.9 km	MPC; JPL
618929	2004 TS_{88}	—	October 5, 2004	Kitt Peak	Spacewatch	·	750 m	MPC; JPL
618930	2004 TC_{100}	—	October 5, 2004	Kitt Peak	Spacewatch	·	1.5 km	MPC; JPL
618931	2004 TW_{162}	—	October 6, 2004	Kitt Peak	Spacewatch	·	1.6 km	MPC; JPL
618932	2004 TY_{164}	—	October 7, 2004	Kitt Peak	Spacewatch	·	1.1 km	MPC; JPL
618933	2004 TK_{181}	—	October 7, 2004	Kitt Peak	Spacewatch	MAS	610 m	MPC; JPL
618934	2004 TO_{187}	—	September 24, 2004	Kitt Peak	Spacewatch	·	790 m	MPC; JPL
618935	2004 TZ_{198}	—	October 7, 2004	Kitt Peak	Spacewatch	H	310 m	MPC; JPL
618936	2004 TH_{202}	—	October 7, 2004	Kitt Peak	Spacewatch	·	1.1 km	MPC; JPL
618937	2004 TS_{212}	—	October 8, 2004	Kitt Peak	Spacewatch	·	1.7 km	MPC; JPL
618938	2004 TK_{257}	—	October 28, 1995	Kitt Peak	Spacewatch	·	1.5 km	MPC; JPL
618939	2004 TA_{301}	—	October 8, 2004	Kitt Peak	Spacewatch	·	1.5 km	MPC; JPL
618940	2004 TT_{317}	—	October 11, 2004	Kitt Peak	Spacewatch	·	1.3 km	MPC; JPL
618941	2004 TZ_{342}	—	October 13, 2004	Kitt Peak	Spacewatch	·	1.5 km	MPC; JPL
618942	2004 TU_{343}	—	October 14, 2004	Palomar	NEAT	·	950 m	MPC; JPL
618943	2004 TB_{349}	—	October 7, 2004	Kitt Peak	Spacewatch	H	440 m	MPC; JPL
618944	2004 TY_{373}	—	July 28, 2011	Haleakala	Pan-STARRS 1	MAS	610 m	MPC; JPL
618945	2004 TN_{375}	—	October 5, 2004	Kitt Peak	Spacewatch	·	650 m	MPC; JPL
618946	2004 TT_{375}	—	October 9, 2004	Kitt Peak	Spacewatch	·	940 m	MPC; JPL
618947	2004 TV_{376}	—	October 3, 2013	Haleakala	Pan-STARRS 1	·	1.8 km	MPC; JPL
618948	2004 TT_{378}	—	November 1, 2015	Haleakala	Pan-STARRS 1	PHO	770 m	MPC; JPL
618949	2004 TN_{379}	—	December 10, 2009	Mount Lemmon	Mount Lemmon Survey	AGN	1.2 km	MPC; JPL
618950	2004 TA_{384}	—	August 2, 2016	Haleakala	Pan-STARRS 1	·	2.9 km	MPC; JPL
618951	2004 TB_{384}	—	September 18, 2015	Kitt Peak	Spacewatch	·	960 m	MPC; JPL
618952	2004 TF_{384}	—	September 7, 2008	Mount Lemmon	Mount Lemmon Survey	AGN	910 m	MPC; JPL
618953	2004 TP_{384}	—	August 28, 2013	Haleakala	Pan-STARRS 1	·	1.9 km	MPC; JPL
618954	2004 TK_{385}	—	October 7, 2004	Kitt Peak	Spacewatch	NYS	620 m	MPC; JPL
618955	2004 TQ_{386}	—	October 4, 2004	Kitt Peak	Spacewatch	·	1.5 km	MPC; JPL
618956	2004 VF_{33}	—	November 3, 2004	Kitt Peak	Spacewatch	·	940 m	MPC; JPL
618957	2004 VY_{65}	—	October 14, 2004	Kitt Peak	Spacewatch	·	1.3 km	MPC; JPL
618958	2004 VE_{81}	—	October 15, 2004	Mount Lemmon	Mount Lemmon Survey	HOF	2.2 km	MPC; JPL
618959	2004 VE_{87}	—	November 11, 2004	Kitt Peak	Spacewatch	·	1.7 km	MPC; JPL
618960	2004 VQ_{94}	—	November 10, 2004	Kitt Peak	Spacewatch	·	950 m	MPC; JPL
618961	2004 VC_{101}	—	November 9, 2004	Mauna Kea	Veillet, C.	·	1.8 km	MPC; JPL
618962	2004 VU_{105}	—	October 18, 2004	Kitt Peak	Deep Ecliptic Survey	·	1.0 km	MPC; JPL
618963	2004 VD_{132}	—	November 4, 2004	Kitt Peak	Spacewatch	·	900 m	MPC; JPL
618964	2004 VG_{132}	—	October 19, 2011	Haleakala	Pan-STARRS 1	·	1.5 km	MPC; JPL
618965	2004 VZ_{132}	—	October 3, 2013	Mount Lemmon	Mount Lemmon Survey	·	1.7 km	MPC; JPL
618966	2004 VP_{135}	—	November 9, 2004	Catalina	CSS	DOR	1.7 km	MPC; JPL
618967	2004 VV_{135}	—	July 24, 2017	Haleakala	Pan-STARRS 1	·	1.4 km	MPC; JPL
618968	2004 VB_{136}	—	December 22, 2008	Mount Lemmon	Mount Lemmon Survey	NYS	700 m	MPC; JPL
618969	2004 VK_{136}	—	March 29, 2011	Mount Lemmon	Mount Lemmon Survey	HOF	2.1 km	MPC; JPL
618970	2004 VZ_{136}	—	September 1, 2013	Piszkéstető	K. Sárneczky	·	1.7 km	MPC; JPL
618971	2004 WW_{3}	—	November 17, 2004	Campo Imperatore	CINEOS	MAS	530 m	MPC; JPL
618972	2004 WC_{13}	—	September 9, 2008	Mount Lemmon	Mount Lemmon Survey	·	1.6 km	MPC; JPL
618973	2004 XU_{29}	—	December 10, 2004	Socorro	LINEAR	·	2.2 km	MPC; JPL
618974	2004 XF_{44}	—	December 11, 2004	Campo Imperatore	CINEOS	·	2.0 km	MPC; JPL
618975	2004 XY_{52}	—	December 10, 2004	Kitt Peak	Spacewatch	MAS	510 m	MPC; JPL
618976	2004 XM_{59}	—	December 11, 2004	Kitt Peak	Spacewatch	·	1.6 km	MPC; JPL
618977	2004 XX_{99}	—	December 12, 2004	Kitt Peak	Spacewatch	·	890 m	MPC; JPL
618978	2004 XU_{122}	—	September 7, 2000	Kitt Peak	Spacewatch	·	850 m	MPC; JPL
618979	2004 XB_{142}	—	December 14, 2004	Kitt Peak	Spacewatch	·	1.1 km	MPC; JPL
618980	2004 XA_{146}	—	October 8, 2004	Palomar	NEAT	·	1.5 km	MPC; JPL
618981	2004 XY_{193}	—	December 10, 2004	Kitt Peak	Spacewatch	·	1.1 km	MPC; JPL
618982	2004 XR_{194}	—	February 3, 2009	Kitt Peak	Spacewatch	·	1.0 km	MPC; JPL
618983	2004 XM_{196}	—	October 23, 2013	Haleakala	Pan-STARRS 1	DOR	2.0 km	MPC; JPL
618984	2004 YZ_{27}	—	December 17, 2004	Socorro	LINEAR	·	2.5 km	MPC; JPL
618985	2004 YP_{40}	—	January 24, 2015	Haleakala	Pan-STARRS 1	·	1.6 km	MPC; JPL
618986	2005 AA_{83}	—	January 15, 2005	Kitt Peak	Spacewatch	L5	7.9 km	MPC; JPL
618987	2005 AG_{84}	—	November 16, 2011	Catalina	CSS	·	1.3 km	MPC; JPL
618988	2005 BC_{35}	—	January 16, 2005	Mauna Kea	Veillet, C.	L5	5.7 km	MPC; JPL
618989	2005 BS_{35}	—	January 16, 2005	Mauna Kea	Veillet, C.	KOR	1 km	MPC; JPL
618990	2005 BW_{47}	—	January 16, 2005	Mauna Kea	P. A. Wiegert, D. D. Balam	·	850 m	MPC; JPL
618991	2005 BS_{53}	—	June 23, 2017	Haleakala	Pan-STARRS 1	·	1.7 km	MPC; JPL
618992	2005 BH_{56}	—	January 16, 2005	Kitt Peak	Spacewatch	·	860 m	MPC; JPL
618993	2005 CQ_{14}	—	January 16, 2005	Kitt Peak	Spacewatch	·	1.2 km	MPC; JPL
618994	2005 CK_{34}	—	February 2, 2005	Kitt Peak	Spacewatch	·	1.2 km	MPC; JPL
618995	2005 CF_{75}	—	February 2, 2005	Kitt Peak	Spacewatch	·	1.5 km	MPC; JPL
618996	2005 CC_{78}	—	January 23, 2015	Haleakala	Pan-STARRS 1	·	620 m	MPC; JPL
618997	2005 CS_{81}	—	February 9, 2005	Mount Lemmon	Mount Lemmon Survey	·	1 km	MPC; JPL
618998	2005 CV_{82}	—	October 4, 2007	Mount Lemmon	Mount Lemmon Survey	MAS	680 m	MPC; JPL
618999	2005 ES_{17}	—	March 3, 2005	Kitt Peak	Spacewatch	·	1.1 km	MPC; JPL
619000	2005 EA_{40}	—	March 1, 2005	Kitt Peak	Spacewatch	·	510 m	MPC; JPL

back to top

== Meaning of names ==
As minor planet discoveries are confirmed, they are given a permanent number by the IAU's Minor Planet Center (MPC), and the discoverers can then submit names for them, following the IAU's naming conventions. The list below concerns those minor planets in the specified number-range that have received names, and explains the meanings of those names.

Official naming citations of newly named small Solar System bodies are approved and published in a bulletin by IAU's Working Group for Small Bodies Nomenclature (WGSBN). Before May 2021, citations were published in MPC's Minor Planet Circulars for many decades. Recent citations can also be found on the JPL Small-Body Database (SBDB). Until his death in 2016, German astronomer Lutz D. Schmadel compiled these citations into the Dictionary of Minor Planet Names (DMP) and regularly updated the collection.

Based on Paul Herget's The Names of the Minor Planets, Schmadel also researched the unclear origin of numerous asteroids, most of which had been named prior to World War II. This article incorporates text from this source, which is in the public domain: SBDB New namings may only be added to this list below after official publication as the preannouncement of names is condemned. The WGSBN publishes a comprehensive guideline for the naming rules of non-cometary small Solar System bodies.

Named minor planet	Provisional	This minor planet was named for...	Ref; Catalog
618051 Sawicki	2006 TC_{137}	Marcin Sawicki, Canadian Professor and Canada Research Chair at the Department of Astronomy and Physics at Saint Mary's University in Halifax, Nova Scotia.	IAU · 618051
618090 Rucinski	2006 UC_{370}	Slavek Rucinski, Polish-Canadian astronomer and Professor Emeritus at the Department of Astronomy and Astrophysics at the University of Toronto.	IAU · 618090
618132 Verheyen	2006 WS_{129}	Marie Louise Verheyen (1955–2023), mother of amateur meteor observer Jan Verbert.	IAU · 618132
618349 Williekoorts	2017 SB_{17}	Willem Koorts, telescope mechanic.	IAU · 618349
618694 Gertrudegrice	2003 CV_{26}	Gertrude Grice (1911–2000), the mother-in-law of the discoverer.	IAU · 618694
