= List of named minor planets: M =

This is a partial list of named minor planets, containing all those starting with the letter M, as of 19 October 2026. It is ordered in a case-insensitive, alphabetical manner and contains a total of 2,195 entries. Grey minor planets have no article and redirect to the list of minor planets instead (see List of minor planets § Main index).

== M ==
- 325731 Maalin
- 1353 Maartje
- 356863 Maathai
- 214180 Mabaglioni
- 30158 Mabdulla
- 510 Mabella
- 25611 Mabellin
- 28043 Mabelwheeler
- 353682 Maberry
- 5228 Máca
- 12088 Macalintal
- 8423 Macao
- 59087 Maccacaro
- 20892 MacChnoic
- 24643 MacCready
- 497700 MacDougall
- 29555 MACEK
- 10080 Macevans
- 7228 MacGillivray
- 20874 MacGregor
- 3949 Mach
- 2543 Machado
- 3879 Machar
- 175476 Macheret
- 245983 Machholz
- 19730 Machiavelli
- 10646 Machielalberts
- 3109 Machin
- 8277 Machu-Picchu
- 33961 Macinleyneve
- 11266 Macke
- 6204 MacKenzie
- 36226 Mackerras
- 33198 Mackewicz
- 43793 Mackey
- 10513 Mackie
- 5292 Mackwell
- 13213 Maclaurin
- 14438 MacLean
- 34414 MacLennan
- 49448 Macocha
- 9380 Mâcon
- 5309 MacPherson
- 6894 Macreid
- 10373 MacRobert
- 24974 Macúch
- 156580 Madách
- 25652 Maddieball
- 20502 Madeira
- 129453 Madeleinenettie
- 11701 Madeleineyang
- 2569 Madeline
- 226356 Madelinefosbury
- 19417 Madelynho
- 55561 Madenberg
- 6735 Madhatter
- 12317 Madicampbell
- 17042 Madiraju
- 12924 Madisonicole
- 34129 Madisonsneve
- 269323 Madisonvillehigh
- 65859 Mädler
- 74503 Madola
- 33343 Madorobin
- 147703 Madras
- 9479 Madresplazamayo
- 4390 Madreteresa
- 14967 Madrid
- 11407 Madsubramanian
- 33344 Madymesple
- 26611 Madzlandon
- 35171 Maedakoji
- 85422 Maedanaoe
- 22480 Maedatoshihisa
- 8036 Maehara
- 20080 Maeharatorakichi
- 9870 Maehata
- 333125 Maestas
- 11771 Maestlin
- 3916 Maeva
- 18426 Maffei
- 70744 Maffucci
- 4308 Magarach
- 20504 Magbanua
- 318 Magdalena
- 229214 Magdasaina
- 554709 Magdastavinschi
- 55735 Magdeburg
- 15632 Magee-Sauer
- 4055 Magellan
- 34224 Maggiechen
- 21478 Maggiedelano
- 2696 Magion
- 8992 Magnanimity
- 9670 Magni
- 343440 Magnier
- 2094 Magnitka
- 6573 Magnitskij
- 1060 Magnolia
- 3677 Magnusson
- 1459 Magnya
- 1355 Magoeba
- 4980 Magomaev
- 9541 Magri
- 7933 Magritte
- 541618 Magyaribéla
- 203773 Magyarics
- 90472 Mahabal
- 17095 Mahadik
- 27233 Mahajan
- 10819 Mahakala
- 65769 Mahalia
- 18104 Mahalingam
- 130320 Maherrassas
- 10939 Maheshwari
- 4406 Mahler
- 199632 Mahlerede
- 32194 Mahlke
- 31517 Mahoui
- 57915 Mahuchikh
- 127936 Maia
- 13266 Maiabland
- 468581 Maiajasperwhite
- 28273 Maianhvu
- 12089 Maichin
- 22948 Maidanak
- 410928 Maidbronn
- 293383 Maigret
- 52005 Maik
- 3274 Maillen
- 6259 Maillol
- 5835 Mainfranken
- 32207 Mairepercy
- 252794 Maironis
- 4686 Maisica
- 15623 Maitaneam
- 6307 Maiztegui
- 66 Maja
- 304233 Majaess
- 212981 Majalitović
- 142368 Majden
- 7233 Majella
- 295935 Majia
- 454352 Majidzandian
- 47038 Majoni
- 185498 Majorcastroinst
- 10809 Majsterrojr
- 1321 Majuba
- 32631 Majzoub
- 9701 Mak
- 20505 Makadia
- 32278 Makaram
- 3214 Makarenko
- 6682 Makarij
- 5545 Makarov
- 12541 Makarska
- 30170 Makaylaruth
- 136472 Makemake
- 3063 Makhaon
- 2139 Makharadze
- 9088 Maki
- 5466 Makibi
- 26937 Makimiyamoto
- 6606 Makino
- 4904 Makio
- 3196 Maklaj
- 31272 Makosinski
- 6093 Makoto
- 8574 Makotoirie
- 11978 Makotomasako
- 55222 Makotoshinkai
- 1771 Makover
- 24647 Maksimachev
- 2568 Maksutov
- 754 Malabar
- 352834 Málaga
- 616184 Malahat
- 316201 Malala
- 9156 Malanin
- 114027 Malanushenko
- 3479 Malaparte
- 27338 Malaraghavan
- 3057 Mälaren
- 10712 Malashchuk
- 321802 Malaspina
- 1415 Malautra
- 34844 Malavshah
- 7387 Malbil
- 16091 Malchiodi
- 91870 Malcolmjozoff
- 27596 Maldives
- 30222 Malecki
- 9897 Malerba
- 10541 Malesherbes
- 58756 Malgoyre
- 260724 Malherbe
- 6698 Malhotra
- 10415 Mali Lošinj
- 4766 Malin
- 42998 Malinafrank
- 10381 Malinsmith
- 16277 Mallada
- 417955 Mallama
- 6236 Mallard
- 170487 Mallder
- 297409 Mållgan
- 25720 Mallidi
- 9453 Mallorca
- 6824 Mallory
- 32111 Mallorydecoster
- 212215 Mallorykinczyk
- 158899 Malloryvale
- 1179 Mally
- 23418 Malmbäck
- 10550 Malmö
- 1527 Malmquista
- 266622 Málna
- 79889 Maloka
- 24046 Malovany
- 6370 Malpais
- 11121 Malpighi
- 7669 Malše
- 11309 Malus
- 1072 Malva
- 8636 Malvina
- 121018 Malvinabillères
- 17139 Malyshev
- 263940 Malyshkina
- 25937 Malysz
- 10007 Malytheatre
- 749 Malzovia
- 228158 Mamankei
- 8569 Mameli
- 20444 Mamesser
- 10608 Mameta
- 486416 Mami
- 34250 Mamichael
- 10941 Mamidala
- 111661 Mamiegeorge
- 46796 Mamigasakigawa
- 12127 Mamiya
- 20506 Mammana
- 9879 Mammuthus
- 7381 Mamontov
- 4613 Mamoru
- 149573 Mamorudoi
- 343587 Mamuna
- 6193 Manabe
- 17502 Manabeseiji
- 33408 Mananshah
- 5092 Manara
- 3349 Manas
- 6918 Manaslu
- 452307 Manawydan
- 15460 Manca
- 42611 Manchu
- 758 Mancunia
- 27500 Mandelbrot
- 3461 Mandelshtam
- 739 Mandeville
- 12460 Mando
- 33572 Mandolin
- 22280 Mandragora
- 157747 Mandryka
- 30524 Mandushev
- 22697 Mánek
- 11984 Manet
- 27280 Manettedavies
- 13225 Manfredi
- 14057 Manfredstoll
- 20329 Manfro
- 17460 Mang
- 207657 Mangiantini
- 12464 Manhattan
- 307261 Máni
- 228029 MANIAC
- 158222 Manicolas
- 10524 Maniewski
- 13513 Manila
- 12163 Manilius
- 4841 Manjiro
- 22403 Manjitludher
- 8382 Mann
- 243536 Mannheim
- 3698 Manning
- 13156 Mannoucyo
- 2219 Mannucci
- 123290 Manoa
- 72841 Manolaneri
- 9394 Manosque
- 22756 Manpreetkaur
- 8536 Måns
- 79138 Mansfeld
- 20416 Mansour
- 6845 Mansurova
- 542926 Manteca
- 17488 Mantl
- 870 Manto
- 162166 Mantsch
- 29353 Manu
- 17720 Manuboccuni
- 71555 Manuecharpentier
- 12777 Manuel
- 74093 Manuelalippi
- 160575 Manuelblasco
- 416252 Manuelherrera
- 3186 Manuilova
- 13615 Manulis
- 385446 Manwë
- 20330 Manwell
- 15575 Manyakumar
- 7104 Manyousyu
- 72801 Manzanera
- 34523 Manzanero
- 5929 Manzano
- 14103 Manzoni
- 218097 Maoxianxin
- 18550 Maoyisheng
- 216261 Mapihsia
- 155948 Maquet
- 279035 Mara
- 194970 Márai
- 18950 Marakessler
- 35462 Maramkaire
- 21306 Marani
- 20420 Marashwhitman
- 4356 Marathon
- 666479 Maratmingaliev
- 565 Marbachia
- 256813 Marburg
- 71445 Marc
- 13249 Marcallen
- 87219 Marcbernstein
- 20036 Marcboucher
- 85183 Marcelaymé
- 12275 Marcelgoffin
- 10403 Marcelgrün
- 1730 Marceline
- 1300 Marcelle
- 23946 Marcelleroux
- 95783 Marceloemilio
- 718490 Marcelosouza
- 26883 Marcelproust
- 30307 Marcelriesz
- 201497 Marcelroche
- 28621 Marcfries
- 11239 Marcgraf
- 29437 Marchais
- 6736 Marchare
- 53640 Marché
- 22155 Marchetti
- 55196 Marchini
- 39734 Marchiori
- 6639 Marchis
- 9297 Marchuk
- 34148 Marchuo
- 3791 Marci
- 269484 Marcia
- 7809 Marcialangton
- 26269 Marciaprill
- 31948 Marciarieke
- 10471 Marciniak
- 144333 Marcinkiewicz
- 765015 Marčiulionis
- 10778 Marcks
- 20507 Marclaessens
- 53141 Marcmoniez
- 55845 Marco
- 10738 Marcoaldo
- 49443 Marcobondi
- 50275 Marcocasalini
- 239105 Marcocattaneo
- 100726 Marcoiozzi
- 229723 Marcoludwig
- 56361 Marcomontagni
- 7388 Marcomorelli
- 9425 Marconcini
- 1332 Marconia
- 99389 Marconovi
- 113213 Marcoolmo
- 29457 Marcopolo
- 16967 Marcosbosso
- 11951 Marcoschioppa
- 38245 Marcospontes
- 166746 Marcpostman
- 369088 Marcus
- 7447 Marcusaurelius
- 310025 Marcuscooper
- 43841 Marcustacitus
- 33251 Marcvandenbroeck
- 22579 Marcyeager
- 257438 Marcyharbut
- 160259 Mareike
- 26422 Marekbuchman
- 20508 Marekhusárik
- 29745 Mareknovak
- 7780 Maren
- 20497 Mařenka
- 2173 Maresjev
- 22933 Mareverett
- 4300 Marg Edmondson
- 13424 Margalida
- 13449 Margaretgarland
- 119195 Margaretgreer
- 220495 Margarethe
- 355256 Margarethekahn
- 50725 Margarethuggins
- 46270 Margaretlandis
- 37159 Margaretmead
- 70030 Margaretmiller
- 143048 Margaretpenston
- 262106 Margaretryan
- 186411 Margaretsimon
- 310 Margarita
- 300821 Margaritasalas
- 22038 Margarshain
- 28511 Marggraff
- 735 Marghanna
- 248866 Margherita
- 156631 Margitan
- 91898 Margnetti
- 1175 Margo
- 2561 Margolin
- 162466 Margon
- 1434 Margot
- 1410 Margret
- 20540 Marhalpern
- 170 Maria
- 29834 Mariacallas
- 39336 Mariacapria
- 17899 Mariacristina
- 12624 Mariacunitia
- 29346 Mariadina
- 571938 Mariaeimmart
- 20055 Maríaespínola
- 15120 Mariafélix
- 17147 Mariafields
- 21516 Mariagodinez
- 17961 Mariagorodnitsky
- 10924 Mariagriffin
- 14230 Mariahines
- 9815 Mariakirch
- 34063 Mariamakarova
- 450806 Mariamalibran
- 17614 Mariamartínez
- 20139 Marianeschi
- 55112 Mariangela
- 602 Marianna
- 25457 Mariannamao
- 369134 Mariareiche
- 55987 Maríaruiz
- 15855 Mariasalvatore
- 20509 Mariavarela
- 41030 Mariawomack
- 20634 Marichardson
- 24206 Mariealoia
- 52982 Marieclaire
- 126748 Mariegerbet
- 12631 Mariekebaan
- 14804 Mariekschmidt
- 21346 Marieladislav
- 4853 Marielukac
- 57471 Mariemarsina
- 20576 Marieoertle
- 242235 Marieskálová
- 2144 Marietta
- 242479 Marijampolė
- 15168 Marijnfranx
- 28492 Marik
- 48779 Mariko
- 8438 Marila
- 20580 Marilpeters
- 1486 Marilyn
- 20124 Marilynfogel
- 10701 Marilynsimons
- 29842 Marilynsoper
- 20836 Marilytedja
- 4494 Marimo
- 1202 Marina
- 20001 Marinakoren
- 112947 Marinascatena
- 46592 Marinawatanabe
- 4633 Marinbica
- 32262 Marinferrais
- 12363 Marinmarais
- 12931 Mario
- 5518 Mariobotta
- 11165 Mariocabrera
- 57076 Mariocambi
- 7684 Marioferrero
- 43993 Mariola
- 210350 Mariolisa
- 11454 Mariomelita
- 133537 Mariomotta
- 506 Marion
- 102618 Marionacaldentey
- 74317 Marionbonafous
- 33823 Mariorigutti
- 11328 Mariotozzi
- 7972 Mariotti
- 15837 Mariovalori
- 20195 Mariovinci
- 604750 Mārisābele
- 16750 Marisandoz
- 733173 Mārīteeglīte
- 912 Maritima
- 7984 Marius
- 10466 Marius-Ioan
- 130067 Marius-Phaneuf
- 551510 Mariuszkukava
- 679996 Mariyafilippovna
- 679999 Mariyavarkina
- 30348 Marizzabailey
- 2180 Marjaleena
- 4064 Marjorie
- 20510 Marjoriegalinier
- 4655 Marjoriika
- 2362 Mark Twain
- 48838 Markackermann
- 32379 Markadame
- 565122 Markbowman
- 30548 Markburchell
- 25538 Markcarlson
- 134178 Markchodas
- 20782 Markcroce
- 391532 Markdowning
- 4302 Markeev
- 4253 Märker
- 17045 Markert
- 128604 Markfisher
- 34310 Markhannum
- 18821 Markhavel
- 23992 Markhobbs
- 129332 Markhunten
- 20141 Markidger
- 90564 Markjarnyk
- 333617 Markjohnson
- 32606 Markkanen
- 167748 Markkelly
- 28151 Markknopfler
- 243516 Marklarsen
- 33262 Marklewis
- 34443 Markmadland
- 130249 Markminer
- 34322 Marknandor
- 121615 Marknoteware
- 27514 Markov
- 333288 Markperry
- 27330 Markporter
- 10598 Markrees
- 7778 Markrobinson
- 16105 Marksaunders
- 8015 Marksimons
- 51529 Marksimpson
- 554268 Marksylvester
- 190710 Marktapley
- 7004 Markthiemens
- 345971 Marktorrence
- 178088 Marktovey
- 454409 Markusloose
- 207504 Markusovszky
- 5359 Markzakharov
- 28824 Marlablair
- 12859 Marlamoore
- 1010 Marlene
- 746 Marlu
- 1174 Marmara
- 711 Marmulla
- 13256 Marne
- 5002 Marnix
- 149955 Maron
- 317809 Marot
- 10264 Marov
- 7527 Marples
- 218400 Marquardt
- 28995 Marquess
- 74025 Marquette
- 12353 Márquez
- 7515 Marrucino
- 321484 Marsaalam
- 4463 Marschwarzschild
- 1877 Marsden
- 16069 Marshafolger
- 2604 Marshak
- 32279 Marshall
- 741306 Marshallmccall
- 19815 Marshasega
- 20535 Marshburrows
- 40134 Marsili
- 18012 Marsland
- 649238 Marsloire
- 39795 Marson
- 42985 Marsset
- 101713 Marston
- 154997 Marstream
- 98494 Marsupilami
- 343158 Marsyas
- 79212 Martadigrazia
- 15376 Marták
- 21190 Martamaffei
- 5832 Martaprincipe
- 3250 Martebo
- 333605 Martella
- 4061 Martelli
- 5026 Martes
- 205 Martha
- 299362 Marthacole
- 175152 Marthafarkas
- 26744 Marthahaynes
- 10024 Marthahazen
- 212403 Marthakusterer
- 13438 Marthanalexander
- 20067 Marthanieves
- 100934 Marthanussbaum
- 212121 Marthegautier
- 20172 Martin
- 7100 Martin Luther
- 981 Martina
- 241475 Martinagedeck
- 161230 Martinbacháček
- 12343 Martinbeech
- 428351 Martinchalifour
- 31828 Martincordiner
- 6385 Martindavid
- 6115 Martinduncan
- 314808 Martindutertre
- 9283 Martinelvis
- 2075 Martinez
- 19756 Martínezfrías
- 246803 Martinezpatrick
- 19080 Martínfierro
- 9521 Martinhoffmann
- 8152 Martinlee
- 33285 Martínleiva
- 34000 Martinmatl
- 483615 Martinmccarthy
- 7547 Martinnakata
- 61195 Martinoli
- 53109 Martinphillipps
- 614664 Martinroth
- 11811 Martinrubin
- 12136 Martinryle
- 15528 Martinsmedina
- 7799 Martinšolc
- 34584 Martintowner
- 3081 Martinůboh
- 1582 Martir
- 43924 Martoni
- 25619 Martonspohn
- 10430 Martschmidt
- 364264 Martymartina
- 19962 Martynenko
- 2376 Martynov
- 79643 Martynware
- 129095 Martyschmitzer
- 22488 Martyschwartz
- 69406 Martz-Kohl
- 6804 Maruseppu
- 15301 Marutesser
- 5376 Maruthiakella
- 5147 Maruyama
- 4309 Marvin
- 129963 Marvinwalthall
- 187125 Marxgyörgy
- 2779 Mary
- 45699 Maryalba
- 34739 Maryalice
- 85471 Maryam
- 28801 Maryanderson
- 20990 Maryannehervey
- 3919 Maryanning
- 50753 Maryblagg
- 20007 Marybrown
- 10736 Marybrück
- 16059 Marybuda
- 24296 Marychristie
- 649816 Marycoates
- 19436 Marycole
- 6603 Marycragg
- 12627 Maryedwards
- 98825 Maryellen
- 28664 Maryellenfay
- 7091 Maryfields
- 27546 Maryfran
- 19473 Marygardner
- 170700 Marygoldaross
- 21861 Maryhedberg
- 333634 Maryhinkle
- 12344 Maryland
- 9824 Marylea
- 21479 Marymartha
- 20450 Marymohammed
- 43752 Maryosipova
- 20992 Marypearse
- 24827 Maryphil
- 26592 Maryrenfro
- 52691 Maryrobinettek
- 33264 Maryrogers
- 26698 Maryschroeder
- 84926 Marywalker
- 24370 Marywang
- 33347 Maryzhu
- 7640 Marzari
- 26259 Marzigliano
- 19618 Maša
- 13553 Masaakikoyama
- 12027 Masaakitanaka
- 282903 Masada
- 16853 Masafumi
- 5850 Masaharu
- 6450 Masahikohayashi
- 15922 Masajisaito
- 8503 Masakatsu
- 10602 Masakazu
- 5822 Masakichi
- 20538 Masakifujimoto
- 9190 Masako
- 10401 Masakoba
- 10802 Masamifuruya
- 52455 Masamika
- 9414 Masamimurakami
- 47293 Masamitsu
- 8726 Masamotonasu
- 4614 Masamura
- 16760 Masanori
- 14962 Masanoriabe
- 27791 Masaru
- 1841 Masaryk
- 29167 Masataka
- 11752 Masatakesagai
- 23772 Masateru
- 7614 Masatomi
- 31671 Masatoshi
- 23109 Masayanagisawa
- 16649 Masayasu
- 5295 Masayo
- 8206 Masayuki
- 26104 Masayukimori
- 58184 Masayukiyamamoto
- 21219 Mascagni
- 21697 Mascharak
- 27922 Mascheroni
- 438973 Masci
- 17403 Masciarelli
- 9841 Mašek
- 25099 Mashinskiy
- 1467 Mashona
- 4126 Mashu
- 21795 Masi
- 8255 Masiero
- 25965 Masihdas
- 225033 Maskoliūnas
- 4935 Maslachkova
- 15691 Maslov
- 8449 Maslovets
- 5245 Maslyakov
- 3131 Mason-Dixon
- 26699 Masoncole
- 15884 Maspalomas
- 4547 Massachusetts
- 20 Massalia
- 3298 Massandra
- 18946 Massar
- 18381 Massenet
- 10690 Massera
- 1904 Massevitch
- 14420 Massey
- 85819 Massimoamato
- 51406 Massimocalvani
- 760 Massinga
- 11440 Massironi
- 10813 Mästerby
- 21561 Masterman
- 17196 Mastrodemos
- 13654 Masuda
- 6794 Masuisakura
- 4293 Masumi
- 8041 Masumoto
- 8355 Masuo
- 2685 Masursky
- 9216 Masuzawa
- 9111 Matarazzo
- 25038 Matebezdek
- 22644 Matejbel
- 60972 Matenko
- 2680 Mateo
- 9278 Matera
- 26442 Matfernandez
- 28074 Matgallagher
- 49700 Mather
- 454 Mathesis
- 97632 Mathewwells
- 6768 Mathiasbraun
- 1592 Mathieu
- 551212 Mathieuudriot
- 253 Mathilde
- 10977 Mathlener
- 175301 Mathur
- 543229 Matiganis
- 8240 Matisse
- 17197 Matjazbone
- 17201 Matjazhumar
- 10276 Matney
- 6526 Matogawa
- 31716 Matoonder
- 22776 Matossian
- 1513 Mátra
- 17354 Matrosov
- 5934 Mats
- 573731 Matsnev
- 2586 Matson
- 9229 Matsuda
- 8113 Matsue
- 7301 Matsuitakafumi
- 8693 Matsuki
- 15739 Matsukuma
- 6660 Matsumoto
- 9573 Matsumotomas
- 9234 Matsumototaku
- 9105 Matsumura
- 9104 Matsuo
- 10829 Matsuobasho
- 33059 Matsuoka
- 6607 Matsushima
- 18903 Matsuura
- 4844 Matsuyama
- 17281 Mattblythe
- 22990 Mattbrenner
- 12983 Mattcox
- 13750 Mattdawson
- 11695 Mattei
- 30537 Matteocrismani
- 39875 Matteolombardo
- 883 Matterania
- 293909 Matterhorn
- 12985 Mattgarrison
- 6626 Mattgenge
- 129173 Mattgoman
- 30373 Mattharley
- 26337 Matthewagam
- 24188 Matthewage
- 12207 Matthewbeasley
- 31489 Matthewchun
- 31296 Matthewclement
- 22028 Matthewdaniels
- 24224 Matthewdavis
- 90461 Matthewgraham
- 20062 Matthewgriffin
- 21626 Matthewhall
- 163244 Matthewhill
- 20541 Matthewhopkins
- 8998 Matthewizawa
- 333190 Matthewjones
- 28402 Matthewkim
- 25053 Matthewknight
- 15030 Matthewkroll
- 27123 Matthewlam
- 23818 Matthewlepow
- 23837 Matthewnanni
- 32071 Matthewretchin
- 7687 Matthias
- 53119 Matthiasgoerne
- 208196 Matthiashahn
- 230415 Matthiasjung
- 541983 Matthiaspenselin
- 2714 Matti
- 145782 Mattiabaraldi
- 765 Mattiaca
- 7847 Mattiaorsi
- 27217 Mattieharrington
- 28521 Mattmcintyre
- 23064 Mattmiller
- 23831 Mattmooney
- 20901 Mattmuehler
- 314159 Mattparker
- 27356 Mattstrom
- 281772 Matttaylor
- 21791 Mattweegman
- 31844 Mattwill
- 7298 Matudaira-gou
- 167852 Maturana
- 553076 Maturkanič
- 15531 Matusch
- 2295 Matusovskij
- 6622 Matvienko
- 35237 Matzner
- 1748 Mauderli
- 12782 Mauersberger
- 117385 Maughan
- 188534 Mauna Kea
- 34901 Mauna Loa
- 100940 Maunder
- 23988 Maungakiekie
- 15355 Maupassant
- 3281 Maupertuis
- 28039 Mauraoei
- 9904 Mauratombelli
- 21676 Maureenanne
- 5644 Maureenbell
- 25366 Maureenbobo
- 28467 Maurentejamie
- 28078 Mauricehilleman
- 53088 Mauricehirsch
- 216428 Mauricio
- 33433 Maurilia
- 745 Mauritia
- 43882 Maurivicoli
- 33438 Mauriziopajola
- 137082 Maurobachini
- 18631 Maurogherardini
- 127660 Mauroianeselli
- 3780 Maury
- 120131 MAVEN
- 1607 Mavis
- 4456 Mawson
- 6548 Maxalexander
- 72827 Maxaub
- 48434 Maxbeckmann
- 13905 Maxbernstein
- 29439 Maxfabiani
- 14836 Maxfrisch
- 3727 Maxhell
- 66097 Maximelebreton
- 1217 Maximiliana
- 31660 Maximiliandu
- 4145 Maximova
- 3977 Maxine
- 5431 Maxinehelin
- 31998 Maxlevine
- 207385 Maxou
- 30326 Maxpine
- 10475 Maxpoilâne
- 25464 Maxrabinovich
- 10510 Maxschreier
- 47843 Maxson
- 801733 Maxteodorescu
- 305238 Maxuehui
- 52030 Maxvasile
- 12760 Maxwell
- 20542 Maxwest
- 26622 Maxwimberley
- 348 May
- 32582 Mayachandar
- 2931 Mayakovsky
- 217366 Mayalin
- 2131 Mayall
- 28042 Mayapatel
- 32069 Mayarao
- 47466 Mayatoyoshima
- 32302 Mayavarma
- 8083 Mayeda
- 221454 Mayerlambert
- 23994 Mayhan
- 8622 Mayimbialik
- 255940 Maylis
- 4900 Maymelou
- 7276 Maymie
- 5132 Maynard
- 4960 Mayo
- 210292 Mayongsheng
- 333255 Mayorga
- 3870 Mayré
- 20024 Mayrémartínez
- 1690 Mayrhofer
- 21518 Maysunhasan
- 6118 Mayuboshi
- 9418 Mayumi
- 10322 Mayuminarita
- 62151 Mayumisuzuki
- 28630 Mayuri
- 108113 Maza
- 11033 Mazanek
- 248839 Mažeikiai
- 12094 Mazumder
- 27975 Mazurkiewicz
- 10671 Mazurova
- 309206 Mažvydas
- 210182 Mazzini
- 35461 Mazzucato
- 184314 Mbabamwanawaresa
- 27227 McAdam
- 17408 McAdams
- 13764 Mcalanis
- 22777 McAliley
- 5673 McAllister
- 22780 McAlpine
- 13622 McArthur
- 3352 McAuliffe
- 15834 McBride
- 10404 McCall
- 279410 McCallon
- 90820 McCann
- 21698 McCarron
- 14463 McCarter
- 106537 McCarthy
- 4148 McCartney
- 3777 McCauley
- 237397 Mccauleyrench
- 113461 McCay
- 33604 McChesney
- 30093 McClanahan
- 30321 McCleary
- 5641 McCleese
- 20440 McClintock
- 17104 McCloskey
- 37678 McClure
- 28156 McColl
- 24493 McCommon
- 9929 McConnell
- 3527 McCord
- 25725 McCormick
- 4259 McCoy
- 8258 McCracken
- 17205 McCreery
- 1880 McCrosky
- 33605 McCue
- 10059 McCullough
- 10086 McCurdy
- 2007 McCuskey
- 31522 McCutchen
- 17185 Mcdavid
- 116446 McDermid
- 16267 Mcdermott
- 991 McDonalda
- 34799 Mcdonaldboyer
- 9159 McDonnell
- 333107 McDonough
- 4589 McDowell
- 1853 McElroy
- 7750 McEwen
- 3066 McFadden
- 21455 Mcfarland
- 10036 McGaha
- 6819 McGarvey
- 8545 McGee
- 189795 McGehee
- 2891 McGetchin
- 6904 McGill
- 21576 McGivney
- 3300 McGlasson
- 10638 McGlothlin
- 9460 McGlynn
- 4432 McGraw-Hill
- 29146 McHone
- 5061 McIntosh
- 26264 McIntyre
- 5382 McKay
- 77166 McKaye
- 5663 McKeegan
- 7150 McKellar
- 42531 McKenna
- 33599 Mckennaloop
- 22587 McKennon
- 7845 Mckim
- 296930 McLaren
- 2024 McLaughlin
- 308680 McLennan
- 24386 McLindon
- 46829 McMahon
- 1955 McMath
- 2289 McMillan
- 32186 McMullan
- 3354 McNair
- 4326 McNally
- 3173 McNaught
- 16268 Mcneeley
- 20032 McNish
- 47044 Mcpainter
- 28575 McQuaid
- 20567 McQuarrie
- 5223 McSween
- 2417 McVittie
- 25491 Meador
- 4600 Meadows
- 27384 Meaganbethel
- 28934 Meagancurrie
- 12117 Meagmessina
- 4050 Mebailey
- 21785 Méchain
- 13293 Mechelen
- 28782 Mechling
- 873 Mechthild
- 255257 Mechwart
- 5025 Mecisteus
- 7971 Meckbach
- 6124 Mecklenburg
- 161349 Mecsek
- 212 Medea
- 366272 Medellín
- 18189 Medeobaldia
- 4715 Medesicaste
- 33376 Medi
- 8333 Medina
- 4695 Mediolanum
- 41450 Medkeff
- 19704 Medlock
- 79347 Medlov
- 19775 Medmondson
- 4836 Medon
- 18755 Meduna
- 149 Medusa
- 17000 Medvedev
- 4367 Meech
- 31477 Meenakshi
- 31617 Meeraradha
- 10647 Meesters
- 2213 Meeus
- 34355 Mefford
- 464 Megaira
- 34633 Megancantwell
- 52860 Méganediet
- 565039 Meganengel
- 18659 Megangross
- 32604 Meganmansfield
- 26545 Meganperkins
- 33614 Meganploch
- 34219 Megantang
- 4843 Mégantic
- 4833 Meges
- 28407 Meghanarao
- 28626 Meghanshea
- 33688 Meghnabehari
- 26395 Megkurohara
- 16075 Meglass
- 24494 Megmoulding
- 14032 Mego
- 22487 Megphillips
- 8353 Megryan
- 3774 Megumi
- 19246 Megumisasaki
- 70716 Mehall
- 6215 Mehdia
- 1968 Mehltretter
- 172951 Mehoke
- 28583 Mehrotra
- 7049 Meibom
- 2881 Meiden
- 9892 Meigetsuki
- 12099 Meigooni
- 18809 Meileawertz
- 353194 Meilutytė
- 5358 Meineko
- 4065 Meinel
- 15310 Meir
- 5965 Meisel
- 202907 Meisenheimer
- 187276 Meištas
- 85179 Meistereckhart
- 6999 Meitner
- 33534 Meiyamamura
- 37626 Meizen
- 3239 Meizhou
- 24603 Mekistheus
- 100936 Mekong
- 14115 Melaas
- 33464 Melahudock
- 21914 Melakabinoff
- 5708 Melancholia
- 7906 Melanchton
- 688 Melanie
- 17014 Melaniequan
- 481993 Melaniezander
- 12973 Melanthios
- 336698 Melbourne
- 3235 Melchior
- 25085 Melena
- 56 Melete
- 137 Meliboea
- 244932 Méliès
- 33892 Meligingrich
- 26334 Melimcdowell
- 55815 Melindakim
- 21744 Meliselinger
- 114738 Melissa
- 5626 Melissabrucker
- 564052 Melissagraham
- 301566 Melissajane
- 33226 Melissamacko
- 13308 Melissamayne
- 33912 Melissanoland
- 8626 Melissarauch
- 333586 Melissarodriguez
- 676 Melitta
- 31770 Melivanhouten
- 869 Mellena
- 2237 Melnikov
- 8216 Melosh
- 38024 Melospadafora
- 18 Melpomene
- 373 Melusina
- 108096 Melvin
- 7177 Melvyntaylor
- 15595 Melwincheng
- 12119 Memamis
- 40092 Memel
- 9562 Memling
- 2895 Memnon
- 1247 Memoria
- 4355 Memphis
- 27988 Menabrea
- 54522 Menaechmus
- 9481 Menchú
- 3313 Mendel
- 2769 Mendeleev
- 3954 Mendelssohn
- 12615 Mendesdeleon
- 6316 Méndez
- 77136 Mendillo
- 3868 Mendoza
- 1647 Menelaus
- 4068 Menestheus
- 3740 Menge
- 12106 Menghuan
- 6283 Menghuazhu
- 24818 Menichelli
- 188 Menippe
- 4568 Menkaure
- 30092 Menke
- 216295 Menorca
- 6205 Menottigalli
- 3889 Menshikov
- 7116 Mentall
- 1078 Mentha
- 3451 Mentor
- 1967 Menzel
- 3553 Mera
- 536 Merapi
- 10972 Merbold
- 17089 Mercado
- 21291 Mercalli
- 54852 Mercatali
- 4798 Mercator
- 1136 Mercedes
- 27147 Mercedessosa
- 18656 Mergler
- 7546 Meriam
- 48458 Merian
- 11193 Mérida
- 15403 Mérignac
- 3596 Meriones
- 308934 Merkinė
- 22132 Merkley
- 16269 Merkord
- 2598 Merlin
- 5456 Merman
- 1051 Merope
- 19355 Merpalehmann
- 65672 Merrick
- 11768 Merrill
- 162158 Merrillhess
- 8191 Mersenne
- 3303 Merta
- 1299 Mertona
- 808 Merxia
- 34447 Mesidor
- 178014 Meslay
- 7062 Meslier
- 56000 Mesopotamia
- 545 Messalina
- 7861 Messenger
- 16450 Messerschmidt
- 11050 Messiaën
- 6690 Messick
- 24856 Messidoro
- 7359 Messier
- 1949 Messina
- 6077 Messner
- 11253 Mesyats
- 162059 Mészáros
- 1050 Meta
- 32398 Métayer
- 792 Metcalfia
- 299518 Metchev
- 7260 Metelli
- 293131 Meteora
- 9 Metis
- 90672 Metrorheinneckar
- 2486 Metsähovi
- 15708 Metsoc
- 1727 Mette
- 9377 Metz
- 89455 Metzendorf
- 18789 Metzger
- 22583 Metzler
- 15353 Meucci
- 35137 Meudon
- 10079 Meunier
- 419521 Meursault
- 3016 Meuse
- 10806 Mexico
- 1574 Meyer
- 1739 Meyermann
- 22537 Meyerowitz
- 228165 Mezentsev
- 287347 Mézes
- 2229 Mezzarco
- 11448 Miahajduková
- 2911 Miahelena
- 27519 Miames
- 578168 Miaochangwen
- 246643 Miaoli
- 21635 Micahtoll
- 345574 Michael
- 8032 Michaeladams
- 22628 Michaelallen
- 8790 Michaelamato
- 33451 Michaelarney
- 16888 Michaelbarber
- 28705 Michaelbecker
- 162395 Michaelbird
- 12069 Michaelbruno
- 146921 Michaelbuckley
- 8129 Michaelbusch
- 18626 Michaelcarr
- 28874 Michaelchen
- 635381 Michaelcoates
- 32584 Michaelcollins
- 44195 Michaelcordova
- 129973 Michaeldaly
- 205823 Michaeldavis
- 23121 Michaelding
- 20399 Michaelesser
- 20543 Michaelfauerbach
- 20546 Michaelfrühauf
- 26417 Michaelgord
- 159999 Michaelgriffin
- 224962 Michaelgrünewald
- 165659 Michaelhicks
- 78391 Michaeljäger
- 31239 Michaeljames
- 776645 Michaelkarrer
- 268057 Michaelkaschke
- 333608 Michaelkaye
- 438881 Michaelkhan
- 19591 Michaelklein
- 5373 Michaelkurtz
- 20564 Michaellane
- 29654 Michaellaue
- 34161 Michaellee
- 47786 Michaelleinbach
- 568959 Michaellesko
- 38044 Michaellucas
- 15148 Michaelmaryott
- 554979 Michaelmazur
- 129158 Michaelmellman
- 13319 Michaelmi
- 604773 Michaelmöller
- 20033 Michaelnoble
- 21713 Michaelolson
- 24438 Michaeloy
- 9621 Michaelpalin
- 92893 Michaelperson
- 18190 Michaelpizer
- 121654 Michaelpryzby
- 34262 Michaelren
- 32070 Michaelretchin
- 298877 Michaelreynolds
- 24303 Michaelrice
- 23016 Michaelroche
- 25495 Michaelroddy
- 217124 Michaelsalinas
- 21743 Michaelsegal
- 12247 Michaelsekerak
- 29803 Michaelshao
- 281661 Michaelsiems
- 333234 Michaelstarobin
- 170008 Michaelstrauss
- 189035 Michaelsummers
- 30431 Michaeltran
- 197845 Michaelvincent
- 129966 Michaelward
- 20027 Michaelwatson
- 25159 Michaelwest
- 25486 Michaelwham
- 30334 Michaelwiner
- 127810 Michaelwright
- 33446 Michaelyang
- 26433 Michaelyurko
- 28644 Michaelzhang
- 12747 Michageffert
- 31463 Michalgeci
- 376574 Michalkusiak
- 7747 Michałowski
- 11196 Michanikos
- 5769 Michard
- 22482 Michbertier
- 28778 Michdelucia
- 1348 Michel
- 1045 Michela
- 135662 Michelacastello
- 3001 Michelangelo
- 5338 Michelblanc
- 7389 Michelcombes
- 91429 Michelebianda
- 8454 Micheleferrero
- 108702 Michelefoparri
- 52242 Michelemaoret
- 21465 Michelepatt
- 149865 Michelhernandez
- 10277 Micheli
- 1376 Michelle
- 27107 Michelleabi
- 121008 Michellecrigger
- 31201 Michellegrand
- 14329 Michellethompson
- 28094 Michellewis
- 20639 Michellouie
- 73965 Michelmathieu
- 63787 Michelmaurette
- 125076 Michelmayor
- 37848 Michelmeunier
- 67979 Michelory
- 27758 Michelson
- 66198 Micheltallon
- 385205 Michelvancamp
- 44033 Michez
- 32389 Michflannory
- 53316 Michielford
- 12950 Michielrodenhuis
- 23169 Michikami
- 38669 Michikawa
- 6499 Michiko
- 20547 Michimani
- 10560 Michinari
- 10375 Michiokuga
- 20962 Michizane
- 2348 Michkovitch
- 25050 Michmadsen
- 20286 Michta
- 30437 Michtchenko
- 34660 Mickeyvillarreal
- 5889 Mickiewicz
- 761083 Micloș
- 224617 Micromégas
- 1981 Midas
- 13396 Midavaine
- 346886 Middelburg
- 30406 Middleman
- 20556 Midgekimble
- 31935 Midgley
- 15003 Midori
- 9767 Midsomer Norton
- 11528 Mie
- 1753 Mieke
- 11103 Miekerouppe
- 2715 Mielikki
- 7706 Mien
- 99949 Miepgies
- 24666 Miesvanrohe
- 31439 Mieyamanaka
- 11702 Mifischer
- 11785 Migaic
- 20568 Migaki
- 5016 Migirenko
- 44005 Migliardi
- 5246 Migliorini
- 12898 Mignard
- 12632 Mignonette
- 17779 Migomueller
- 171396 Miguel
- 551233 Miguelanton
- 257371 Miguelbello
- 6138 Miguelhernández
- 362911 Miguelhurtado
- 28439 Miguelreyes
- 646505 Mihăileanu
- 670740 Mihailsandu
- 629141 Mihalikenikő
- 23096 Mihika
- 34337 Mihirjoshi
- 34254 Mihirpatel
- 4806 Miho
- 34893 Mihomasatoshi
- 9382 Mihonoseki
- 18957 Mijacobsen
- 21358 Mijerbarany
- 14808 Mijjum
- 4557 Mika
- 3165 Mikawa
- 51824 Mikeanderson
- 12666 Mikeauldridge
- 11714 Mikebrown
- 17060 Mikecombi
- 13745 Mikecosta
- 134028 Mikefitzgibbon
- 23216 Mikehagler
- 22426 Mikehanes
- 444414 Mikehankey
- 571117 Mikehudson
- 128408 Mikehughes
- 28272 Mikejanner
- 120354 Mikejones
- 6406 Mikejura
- 28091 Mikekane
- 30125 Mikekiser
- 25228 Mikekitt
- 22032 Mikekoop
- 26246 Mikelake
- 121315 Mikelentz
- 26507 Mikelin
- 7936 Mikemagee
- 31848 Mikemattei
- 26336 Mikemcdowell
- 50426 Mikemerrifield
- 121608 Mikemoreau
- 70995 Mikemorton
- 68948 Mikeoates
- 32113 Mikeowen
- 46441 Mikepenston
- 45640 Mikepuzio
- 27336 Mikequinn
- 10789 Mikeread
- 13514 Mikerudenko
- 18434 Mikesandras
- 25940 Mikeschottland
- 20392 Mikeshepard
- 367732 Mikesimonsen
- 326164 Miketoomey
- 16220 Mikewagner
- 9801 Mikewang
- 29725 Mikewest
- 30004 Mikewilliams
- 27400 Mikewong
- 6214 Mikhailgrinev
- 590335 Mikhailkuzmin
- 429120 Mikhaillavrov
- 4729 Mikhailmilʹ
- 541575 Mikhailnazarov
- 1910 Mikhailov
- 9540 Mikhalkov
- 4067 Mikhelʹson
- 30805 Mikimasa
- 11820 Mikiyasato
- 1526 Mikkeli
- 6959 Mikkelkocha
- 21704 Mikkilineni
- 1549 Mikko
- 3381 Mikkola
- 20649 Miklenov
- 163623 Miknaitis
- 8244 Mikolaichuk
- 303648 Mikszáth
- 2969 Mikula
- 11124 Mikulášek
- 3231 Mila
- 16909 Miladejager
- 40706 Milam
- 4701 Milani
- 1605 Milankovitch
- 296525 Milanovskiy
- 3571 Milanštefánik
- 3699 Milbourn
- 878 Mildred
- 6441 Milenajesenská
- 4119 Miles
- 5892 Milesdavis
- 11163 Milešovka
- 1630 Milet
- 29760 Milevsko
- 20548 Milewski
- 216433 Milianleo
- 10241 Miličević
- 6789 Milkey
- 4168 Millan
- 11819 Millarca
- 1826 Miller
- 27236 Millermatt
- 29844 Millette
- 15947 Milligan
- 2659 Millis
- 2904 Millman
- 69961 Millosevich
- 117640 Millsellie
- 54967 Millucci
- 11767 Milne
- 12949 Milogrootjen
- 4725 Milone
- 3337 Miloš
- 590739 Miloslavov
- 11776 Milstein
- 2663 Miltiades
- 4332 Milton
- 8029 Miltthompson
- 31519 Mimamarquez
- 8728 Mimatsu
- 4178 Mimeev
- 1127 Mimi
- 60000 Miminko
- 3840 Mimistrobell
- 29430 Mimiyen
- 1079 Mimosa
- 41213 Mimoun
- 6160 Minakata
- 46634 Minamiaizumachi
- 6721 Minamiawaji
- 5401 Minamioda
- 25296 Minamisatsuma
- 16680 Minamitanemachi
- 6992 Minano-machi
- 10769 Minas Gerais
- 343157 Mindaugas
- 15298 Minde
- 14818 Mindeli
- 30991 Minenze
- 8531 Mineosaito
- 184064 Miner
- 93 Minerva
- 7321 Minervahoyt
- 1458 Mineura
- 28242 Mingantu
- 199953 Mingnaiben
- 173032 Mingus
- 8134 Minin
- 4202 Minitti
- 27348 Mink
- 12493 Minkowski
- 1670 Minnaert
- 58163 Minnesang
- 22397 Minobe
- 121019 Minodamato
- 22589 Minor
- 9972 Minoruoda
- 473503 Minoruozima
- 8403 Minorushimizu
- 6239 Minos
- 7068 Minowa
- 4639 Minox
- 6995 Minoyama
- 3012 Minsk
- 16218 Mintakeyes
- 30144 Minubasu
- 43027 Minusio
- 8772 Minutus
- 10202 Mioaramandea
- 622577 Mioriţa
- 20020 Mipach
- 29765 Miparedes
- 228147 Miquelbarceló
- 94243 Miquelroser
- 185561 Miquelsiquier
- 3633 Mira
- 8169 Mirabeau
- 31582 Miraeparker
- 21526 Mirano
- 541318 Mirasteilas
- 675570 Mircealițe
- 627435 Mircearusu
- 594 Mireille
- 20549 Mirelatrelia
- 144303 Mirellabreschi
- 8214 Mirellalilli
- 9232 Miretti
- 102 Miriam
- 41573 Miriamrobbins
- 33564 Miriamshira
- 8555 Mirimao
- 31147 Miriquidi
- 34717 Mirkovilli
- 11194 Mirna
- 1610 Mirnaya
- 4329 Miró
- 543698 Miromesaroš
- 17049 Miron
- 3624 Mironov
- 12214 Miroshnikov
- 7496 Miroslavholub
- 713428 Mirosławdziergas
- 12118 Mirotsin
- 11881 Mirstation
- 11602 Miryang
- 321357 Mirzakhani
- 569 Misa
- 7438 Misakatouge
- 7128 Misawa
- 24658 Misch
- 7790 Miselli
- 4828 Misenus
- 28911 Mishacollins
- 27513 Mishapipe
- 109573 Mishasmirnov
- 22686 Mishchenko
- 5334 Mishima
- 22347 Mishinatakashi
- 18456 Mišík
- 132820 Miskotte
- 19475 Mispagel
- 23176 Missacarvell
- 667294 Missen
- 21651 Mission Valley
- 223950 Mississauga
- 112483 Missjudy
- 26858 Misterrogers
- 6929 Misto
- 5033 Mistral
- 30205 Mistyevans
- 3111 Misuzu
- 100309 Misuzukaneko
- 4523 MIT
- 1088 Mitaka
- 2924 Mitake-mura
- 20785 Mitalithakor
- 11921 Mitamasahiro
- 3289 Mitani
- 24709 Mitau
- 129196 Mitchbeiser
- 1455 Mitchella
- 20787 Mitchfourman
- 14799 Mitchschulte
- 21798 Mitchweegman
- 129968 Mitchwhiteley
- 4486 Mithra
- 33713 Mithravamshi
- 2262 Mitidika
- 2460 Mitlincoln
- 34996 Mitokoumon
- 32815 Mitsufumi
- 17470 Mitsuhashi
- 5581 Mitsuko
- 6185 Mitsuma
- 16731 Mitsumata
- 11079 Mitsunori
- 67711 Mitsuotoyokawa
- 10886 Mitsuroohba
- 6091 Mitsuru
- 28394 Mittag-Leffler
- 15434 Mittal
- 16779 Mittelman
- 682761 Mittermaiertom
- 5760 Mittlefehldt
- 4027 Mitton
- 12186 Mitukurigen
- 3262 Miune
- 7682 Miura
- 22561 Miviscardi
- 8855 Miwa
- 6050 Miwablock
- 23259 Miwadagakuen
- 25750 Miwnay
- 19534 Miyagi
- 4539 Miyagino
- 9416 Miyahara
- 35172 Miyaharamisao
- 44487 Miyaharaterumasa
- 14902 Miyairi
- 8303 Miyaji
- 9362 Miyajima
- 8296 Miyama
- 6020 Miyamoto
- 8098 Miyamotoatsushi
- 26852 Miyamototakashi
- 4041 Miyamotoyohko
- 3555 Miyasaka
- 8369 Miyata
- 26319 Miyauchi
- 6905 Miyazaki
- 8883 Miyazakihayao
- 5008 Miyazawakenji
- 21016 Miyazawaseiroku
- 134069 Miyo
- 11546 Miyoshimachi
- 34205 Mizerak
- 16719 Mizokami
- 18997 Mizrahi
- 68144 Mizser
- 11159 Mizugaki
- 10147 Mizugatsuka
- 2090 Mizuho
- 19083 Mizuki
- 4541 Mizuno
- 35170 Mizunochisato
- 8197 Mizunohiroshi
- 7668 Mizunotakao
- 6414 Mizunuma
- 7530 Mizusawa
- 6218 Mizushima
- 8947 Mizutani
- 42527 Mizutanimasanori
- 10492 Mizzi
- 85585 Mjolnir
- 22558 Mladen
- 29419 Mládková
- 82463 Mluigiaborsi
- 56422 Mnajdra
- 57 Mnemosyne
- 9023 Mnesthus
- 14880 Moa
- 7239 Mobberley
- 7360 Moberg
- 28516 Möbius
- 182591 Mocescobedo
- 73862 Mochigasechugaku
- 5650 Mochihito-o
- 21089 Mochizuki
- 733 Mocia
- 8889 Mockturtle
- 579890 Mocnik
- 21922 Mocz
- 3344 Modena
- 370 Modestia
- 349862 Modigliani
- 11118 Modra
- 6598 Modugno
- 30439 Moe
- 30917 Moehorgan
- 2764 Moeller
- 9334 Moesta
- 5542 Moffatt
- 8418 Mogamigawa
- 299134 Moggicecchi
- 33509 Mogilny
- 766 Moguntia
- 33850 Mohammadsaki
- 34491 Mohammedsuhail
- 31573 Mohanty
- 29687 Mohdreza
- 28737 Mohindra
- 2528 Mohler
- 8422 Mohorovičıć
- 2971 Mohr
- 65675 Mohr-Gruber
- 638 Moira
- 381458 Moiseenko
- 3080 Moisseiev
- 28729 Moivre
- 5146 Moiwa
- 53285 Mojmír
- 5117 Mokotoyama
- 25751 Mokshagundam
- 30379 Molaro
- 101960 Molau
- 20570 Molchan
- 2419 Moldavia
- 5767 Moldun
- 221712 Moléson
- 124192 Molėtai
- 6835 Molfino
- 3046 Molière
- 9680 Molina
- 35270 Molinari
- 24451 Molion
- 54810 Molleigh
- 45596 Molliesugden
- 8756 Mollissima
- 20472 Mollypettit
- 333228 Mollywasser
- 8245 Molnar
- 20550 Molnar-Bufanda
- 615214 Molnárkristian
- 11426 Molster
- 1428 Mombasa
- 8260 Momcheva
- 12893 Mommert
- 52293 Mommsen
- 10353 Momotaro
- 9178 Momoyo
- 428 Monachia
- 10722 Monari
- 15360 Moncalvo
- 100231 Monceau
- 21553 Monchicourt
- 15468 Mondriaan
- 35316 Monella
- 6676 Monet
- 21236 Moneta
- 352860 Monflier
- 28766 Monge
- 151834 Mongkut
- 3678 Mongmanwai
- 833 Monica
- 4731 Monicagrady
- 7512 Monicalazzarin
- 19603 Monier
- 555112 Monika
- 20551 Monikakamińska
- 274021 Monikapoeller
- 499367 Monikasirp
- 23490 Monikohl
- 734551 Monin
- 14517 Monitoma
- 281820 Monnaves
- 2780 Monnig
- 59388 Monod
- 92297 Monrad
- 3768 Monroe
- 26090 Monrovia
- 20964 Mons Naklethi
- 586003 Monspartsarolta
- 11595 Monsummano
- 10958 Mont Blanc
- 605901 Montághimre
- 535 Montague
- 8890 Montaigne
- 22379 Montale
- 797 Montana
- 8421 Montanari
- 706348 Montcabrer
- 276781 Montchaibeux
- 345720 Monte Vigese
- 14573 Montebugnoli
- 13920 Montecorvino
- 782 Montefiore
- 9383 Montélimar
- 19614 Montelongo
- 7198 Montelupo
- 947 Monterosa
- 7064 Montesquieu
- 5063 Monteverdi
- 6252 Montevideo
- 2272 Montezuma
- 5864 Montgolfier
- 16207 Montgomery
- 36182 Montigiani
- 367693 Montmagastrell
- 30938 Montmartre
- 13112 Montmorency
- 6714 Montréal
- 554239 Montseypedro
- 52589 Montviloff
- 16158 Monty
- 13681 Monty Python
- 9520 Montydibiasi
- 7782 Mony
- 20069 Monyer
- 27450 Monzon
- 58345 Moomintroll
- 30114 Mooney
- 7805 Moons
- 233472 Moorcroft
- 2602 Moore
- 2110 Moore-Sitterly
- 261930 Moorhead
- 163624 Moorthy
- 17446 Mopaku
- 1257 Móra
- 3106 Morabito
- 63068 Moraes
- 10372 Moran
- 5702 Morando
- 33963 Moranhidalgo
- 14643 Morata
- 59970 Morate
- 1901 Moravia
- 5596 Morbidelli
- 17848 Mordechai
- 29435 Mordell
- 14502 Morden
- 25945 Moreadalleore
- 2277 Moreau
- 17892 Morecambewise
- 11950 Morellet
- 6943 Moretto
- 14914 Moreux
- 33940 Morgado
- 3180 Morgan
- 224693 Morganfreeman
- 13486 Morgangibson
- 23821 Morganmonroe
- 27362 Morganroche
- 28400 Morgansinko
- 30240 Morgensen
- 9764 Morgenstern
- 547666 Morgon
- 4650 Mori
- 5048 Moriarty
- 304368 Móricz
- 19190 Morihiroshi
- 8739 Morihisa
- 16718 Morikawa
- 9204 Mörike
- 6643 Morikubo
- 6650 Morimoto
- 435552 Morin
- 14436 Morishita
- 6935 Morisot
- 7797 Morita
- 39314 Moritakumi
- 10878 Moriyama
- 22540 Mork
- 84921 Morkoláb
- 133404 Morogues
- 305254 Moron
- 7724 Moroso
- 1210 Morosovia
- 16036 Moroz
- 4197 Morpheus
- 5521 Morpurgo
- 25906 Morrell
- 152188 Morricone
- 3783 Morris
- 2410 Morrison
- 40209 Morrispodolak
- 7904 Morrow
- 341520 Mors–Somnus
- 8672 Morse
- 19268 Morstadt
- 28117 Mort
- 5106 Mortensen
- 20042 Mortillaro
- 20106 Morton
- 88795 Morvan
- 16693 Moseley
- 11464 Moser
- 69754 Mosesmendel
- 178534 Mosheelitzur
- 31574 Moshova
- 66391 Moshup
- 22492 Mosig
- 39405 Mosigkau
- 8254 Moskovitz
- 787 Moskva
- 2915 Moskvina
- 328563 Mosplanetarium
- 240871 MOSS
- 48472 Mössbauer
- 186832 Mosser
- 4542 Mossotti
- 22292 Mosul
- 14821 Motaeno
- 45500 Motegi
- 77870 MOTESS
- 20731 Mothédiniz
- 32969 Motohikosato
- 250840 Motörhead
- 849224 Motoyama
- 52291 Mott
- 239675 Mottez
- 5388 Mottola
- 33941 Mouginot
- 335306 Mouhot
- 18240 Mould
- 19518 Moulding
- 993 Moultona
- 30963 Mount Banzan
- 11927 Mount Kent
- 4182 Mount Locke
- 17640 Mount Stromlo
- 2590 Mourão
- 12130 Mousa
- 31910 Moustafa
- 88906 Moutier
- 34002 Movsesian
- 30179 Movva
- 23833 Mowers
- 21388 Moyanodeburt
- 233522 Moye
- 13620 Moynahan
- 20552 Moynier
- 300082 Moyocoanno
- 59980 Moza
- 1034 Mozartia
- 2850 Mozhaiskij
- 24602 Mozzhorin
- 4999 MPC
- 293934 MPIA
- 2309 Mr. Spock
- 12448 Mr. Tompkins
- 19081 Mravinskij
- 2986 Mrinalini
- 1832 Mrkos
- 24837 Mšecké Žehrovice
- 5807 Mshatka
- 121468 Msovinskihaskell
- 2116 Mtskheta
- 3396 Muazzez
- 17044 Mubdirahman
- 5122 Mucha
- 2946 Muchachos
- 12412 Muchisachie
- 7074 Muckea
- 293787 Mucunbo
- 278384 Mudanjiang
- 4031 Mueller
- 16623 Muenzel
- 5568 Mufson
- 232949 Muhina
- 40995 Mühleis
- 10746 Mühlhausen
- 243491 Mühlviertel
- 4665 Muinonen
- 7818 Muirhead
- 55384 Muiyimfong
- 4750 Mukai
- 10146 Mukaitadashi
- 24639 Mukhametdinov
- 25629 Mukherjee
- 23834 Mukhopadhyay
- 196640 Mulhacén
- 21708 Mulhall
- 10251 Mulisch
- 5476 Mulius
- 16961 Mullahy
- 310120 Mullaney
- 5164 Mullo
- 7172 Multatuli
- 182730 Muminovic
- 8340 Mumma
- 12362 Mumuryk
- 25769 Munaoli
- 7599 Munari
- 5699 Munch
- 14014 Münchhausen
- 17090 Mundaca
- 15576 Munday
- 28587 Mundkur
- 1466 Mündleria
- 39655 Muneharuasada
- 23079 Munguia
- 6595 Munizbarreto
- 196736 Munkácsy
- 7465 Munkanber
- 163625 Munn
- 1608 Muñoz
- 4942 Munroe
- 12169 Munsterman
- 20287 Munteanu
- 34477 Muntz
- 17910 Munyan
- 1472 Muonio
- 207715 Muqinshuijiao
- 48498 Murahashi
- 3295 Murakami
- 46588 Murakamimasayuki
- 15805 Murakamitakehiko
- 27809 Murakamiyasuhiko
- 30183 Murali
- 21570 Muralidhar
- 5606 Muramatsu
- 18400 Muramatsushigeru
- 5124 Muraoka
- 48635 Murata
- 6538 Muraviov
- 3220 Murayama
- 4642 Murchie
- 128562 Murdin
- 9138 Murdoch
- 19453 Murdochorne
- 26639 Murgaš
- 2982 Muriel
- 13989 Murikabushi
- 9829 Murillo
- 2979 Murmansk
- 10347 Murom
- 19446 Muroski
- 4439 Muroto
- 941 Murray
- 600 Musa
- 7892 Musamurahigashi
- 41481 Musashifuchu
- 3249 Musashino
- 10776 Musashitomiyo
- 10749 Musäus
- 966 Muschi
- 34261 Musharahman
- 29053 Muskau
- 12491 Musschenbroek
- 1059 Mussorgskia
- 296753 Mustafamahmoud
- 2385 Mustel
- 32054 Musunuri
- 6815 Mutchler
- 34814 Muthukumar
- 7793 Mutlu-Pakdil
- 6098 Mutojunkyu
- 12368 Mutsaers
- 7837 Mutsumi
- 115210 Mutvicens
- 6505 Muzzio
- 12933 Muzzonigro
- 4413 Mycerinos
- 24148 Mychajliw
- 31037 Mydon
- 21456 Myers
- 22173 Myersdavis
- 129161 Mykallefevre
- 274843 Mykhailopetrenko
- 311786 Mykolaleontovych
- 316084 Mykolapokropyvny
- 25112 Mymeshkovych
- 14449 Myogizinzya
- 209255 Myotragus
- 6462 Myougi
- 33799 Myra
- 27289 Myrahalpin
- 34049 Myrelleangela
- 179764 Myriamsarah
- 20554 Myriebe
- 10000 Myriostos
- 4752 Myron
- 7835 Myroncope
- 381 Myrrha
- 9203 Myrtus
- 29490 Myslbek
- 53159 Mysliveček
- 33489 Myungjinkim
back to top

== See also ==
- List of minor planet discoverers
- List of observatory codes
- Meanings of minor planet names § Index
