= 766 (disambiguation) =

766 may refer to:

- 766 (year)
- 766 (number)
- 766 Moguntia
- NGC 766
