= Mireille (disambiguation) =

Mireille is a female given name.

Mireille may also refer to:

- Mireille (opera), by Charles Gounod
- 594 Mireille, an asteroid
- Typhoon Mireille, one of the deadliest typhoons of the 1991 Pacific season
