= 764 (disambiguation) =

764 is a year.

764 may also refer to:

- 764 BC
- 764 (number)
- 764 (organization), an online sextortion network
- 764 Gedania, an asteroid
- NGC 764, a double star
