= 720 Bohlinia =

Main-belt asteroid

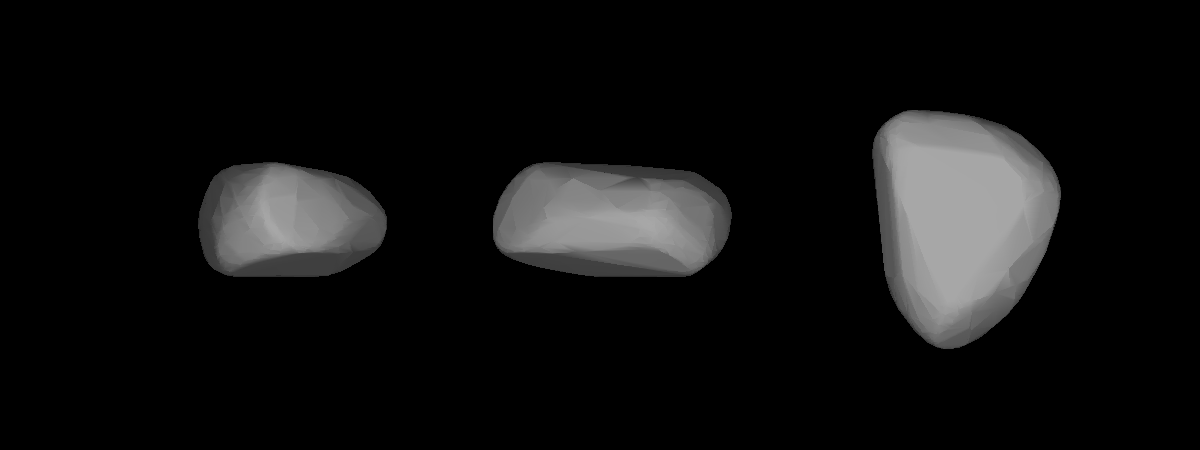
- A three-dimensional model of 720 Bohlinia based on its light curve

Discovery
- Discovered by: Franz Kaiser
- Discovery site: Heidelberg
- Discovery date: 18 October 1911

Designations
- Alternative designations: 1911 MW

Orbital characteristics
- Epoch 31 July 2016 (JD 2457600.5)
- Uncertainty parameter 0
- Observation arc: 117.11 yr (42775 d)
- Aphelion: 2.9376 AU (439.46 Gm)
- Perihelion: 2.8371 AU (424.42 Gm)
- Semi-major axis: 2.8873 AU (431.93 Gm)
- Eccentricity: 0.017406
- Orbital period (sidereal): 4.91 yr (1792.0 d)
- Mean anomaly: 350.275°
- Mean motion: 0° 12^{m} 3.204^{s} / day
- Inclination: 2.3562°
- Longitude of ascending node: 35.706°
- Argument of perihelion: 118.762°
- Known satellites: 1

Physical characteristics
- Mean radius: 16.865±0.7 km 17.32 ± 0.905 km
- Mass: (5.97 ± 0.80) × 10^{16} kg
- Mean density: 2.74 ± 0.56 g/cm^{3}
- Synodic rotation period: 8.919 h (0.3716 d)
- Geometric albedo: 0.203; 0.2029±0.018
- Absolute magnitude (H): 9.71; 9.6

720 Bohlinia is a minor planet, and binary asteroid, orbiting the Sun that was discovered by Franz Kaiser, a German astronomer in 1911. It is named for Swedish astronomer Karl Petrus Theodor Bohlin, to mark his 65th birthday. He had worked on the orbits of asteroids.

It is part of the Koronis family of asteroids. A group of astronomers, including Lucy d'Escoffier Crespo da Silva and Richard P. Binzel, used observations made between 1998 through 2000 to determine the spin-vector alignment of these asteroids. The collaborative work resulted in the creation of 61 new individual rotation lightcurves to augment previous published observations.

Binzel and Schelte Bus further added to the knowledge about this asteroid in a lightwave survey published in 2003. This project was known as Small Main-belt Asteroid Spectroscopic Survey, Phase II or SMASSII, which built on a previous survey of the main-belt asteroids. The visible-wavelength (0.435-0.925 micrometre) spectra data was gathered between August 1993 and March 1999.

== Orbit ==
This object is orbiting the Sun with a semi-major axis of 2.89 AU with a low eccentricity of 0.017, which is carrying it to a distance of 2.94 to 2.94 during each 4.91 year orbital period. The orbital plane is inclined at an angle of 2.36° relative to the plane of the ecliptic. Based on infrared measurements, it has a diameter of 33.73±1.4 km. The spectrum matches a stony S-type asteroid.

== Satellite ==
On 4 September 2025, a team of astronomers at the Pulkovo Observatory, consisting of Denis. L. Gorshanov, Iriada. R. Sokova, Svetlana. N. Petrova, Konstantin. N. Naumov, and Amir. Kh. Aliev discovered one natural satellite orbiting Bohlinia using lightcurve observations. It has been calculated that the orbital period of the satellite is roughly 17.4 hours, with a diameter of 1.75 ± 0.8 km. The announcement of the discovery was made on 21 November 2025, and the satellite currently does not a designation or name.
