= 759 Vinifera =

Large background asteroid

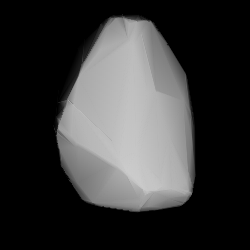
- Modelled shape of Vinifera from its lightcurve

Discovery
- Discovered by: F. Kaiser
- Discovery site: Heidelberg Obs.
- Discovery date: 26 August 1913

Designations
- Pronunciation: /vaɪˈnɪfərə/
- Named after: Vitis vinifera (common grape vine)
- Alternative designations: A913 QC · 1913 SJ
- Minor planet category: main-belt · (middle); background

Orbital characteristics
- Epoch 31 May 2020 (JD 2459000.5)
- Uncertainty parameter 0
- Observation arc: 106.44 yr (38,879 d)
- Aphelion: 3.1565 AU
- Perihelion: 2.0806 AU
- Semi-major axis: 2.6185 AU
- Eccentricity: 0.2054
- Orbital period (sidereal): 4.24 yr (1,548 d)
- Mean anomaly: 79.523°
- Mean motion: 0° 13^{m} 57.36^{s} / day
- Inclination: 19.905°
- Longitude of ascending node: 318.35°
- Argument of perihelion: 0.9245°

Physical characteristics
- Dimensions: 59.0 km × 29.3 km
- Mean diameter: 45.11±2.6 km; 46.48±0.80 km; 52.926±0.199 km
- Synodic rotation period: 14.229±0.003 h
- Geometric albedo: 0.040±0.012; 0.052±0.002; 0.0548±0.007
- Spectral type: SMASS = X
- Absolute magnitude (H): 10.50; 10.60

759 Vinifera (prov. designation: A913 QC or 1913 SJ) is a large background asteroid from the central regions of the asteroid belt, approximately 50 kilometers (31 miles) in diameter. It was discovered on 26 August 1913, by German astronomer Franz Kaiser at the Heidelberg-Königstuhl State Observatory in southwest Germany. The dark X-type asteroid has a rotation period of 14.2 hours and a heavily elongated shape. It was named after the plant species vitis vinifera, also known as the common grape vine.

== Orbit and classification ==
Vinifera is a non-family asteroid of the main belt's background population when applying the hierarchical clustering method to its proper orbital elements. It orbits the Sun in the central asteroid belt at a distance of 2.1–3.2 AU once every 4 years and 3 months (1,548 days; semi-major axis of 2.62 AU). Its orbit has an eccentricity of 0.21 and an inclination of 20° with respect to the ecliptic. The body's observation arc begins with its official discovery observation by Franz Kaiser at the Heidelberg Observatory on 26 August 1913.

== Naming ==
This minor planet was named after the plant vitis vinifera, the common grape vine, to honor the discoverer's ancestors who were winemakers. The naming was mentioned in The Names of the Minor Planets by Paul Herget in 1955 (H 76).

== Physical characteristics ==
In the Bus–Binzel SMASS classification, Vinifera is an X-type asteroid.

=== Rotation period ===
In September 2002, a rotational lightcurve of Vinifera was obtained from photometric observations by Maurice Clark at the Goodsell Observatory (741) in Minnesota. Lightcurve analysis gave a well-defined rotation period of 14.229±0.003 hours with a brightness variation of 0.36±0.02 magnitude (U=3). Other observation by Jean-Gabriel Bosch, Jacques Michelet and René Roy (2002), Brian Uzpen and Steven Kipp (2002), as well as René Roy and Eric Barbotin (2019), gave nearly identical periods of 14.212±0.001, 14.234±0.002 and 14.211±0.003 hours with an amplitude of 0.40±0.01, 0.40±0.02 and 0.36±0.02 magnitude, respectively (U=3/3/3).

=== Diameter and albedo ===
According to the surveys carried out by the Infrared Astronomical Satellite IRAS, the Japanese Akari satellite and the NEOWISE mission of NASA's Wide-field Infrared Survey Explorer (WISE), Vinifera measures (45.11±2.6), (46.48±0.80) and (52.926±0.199) kilometers in diameter and its surface has an albedo of (0.0548±0.007), (0.052±0.002) and (0.040±0.012), respectively.

Alternative mean diameter measurements published by the WISE team include (39.68±0.27 km), (54.967±20.56 km), (55.78±12.09 km) and (58.944±2.130 km) with corresponding albedos of (0.036±0.009), (0.0331±0.0356), (0.03±0.01) and (0.0311±0.0052). The Collaborative Asteroid Lightcurve Link derives an albedo of 0.0500 and a diameter of 45.07 kilometers based on an absolute magnitude of 10.6.

On 13 January 2002, an asteroid occultation of Vinifera gave a best-fit ellipse dimension of (59.0 km × 29.3 km), with a quality rating of 2. Lower rated measurements on 3 October 2011 and on 20 November 2015, gave an ellipse dimension of (53.0 km × 53.0 km) and (47.0 km × 47.0 km), respectively. These timed observations are taken when the asteroid passes in front of a distant star.
