= 777 Gutemberga =

Main-belt asteroid

Discovery
- Discovered by: F. Kaiser
- Discovery site: Heidelberg Obs.
- Discovery date: 24 January 1914

Designations
- Named after: Johannes Gutenberg (German inventor)
- Alternative designations: A914 BF · 1926 EF; A924 YB · 1914 TZ
- Minor planet category: main-belt · (outer); background

Orbital characteristics
- Epoch 31 May 2020 (JD 2459000.5)
- Uncertainty parameter 0
- Observation arc: 105.60 yr (38,570 d)
- Aphelion: 3.5831 AU
- Perihelion: 2.8745 AU
- Semi-major axis: 3.2288 AU
- Eccentricity: 0.1097
- Orbital period (sidereal): 5.80 yr (2,119 d)
- Mean anomaly: 79.152°
- Mean motion: 0° 10^{m} 11.64^{s} / day
- Inclination: 12.942°
- Longitude of ascending node: 283.27°
- Argument of perihelion: 264.44°

Physical characteristics
- Dimensions: 66.0 km × 66.0 km
- Mean diameter: 65.37±1.03 km; 65.57±1.9 km; 71.749±0.095 km
- Synodic rotation period: 12.838±0.006 h
- Geometric albedo: 0.042±0.006; 0.0494±0.003; 0.050±0.002
- Spectral type: C (S3OS2-TH); Cb (S3OS2-BB)
- Absolute magnitude (H): 9.80

777 Gutemberga (prov. designation: A914 BF or 1914 TZ) is a dark and large background asteroid, approximately 66 kilometers (41 miles) in diameter, from the outer regions of the asteroid belt. It was discovered by German astronomer Franz Kaiser at the Heidelberg-Königstuhl State Observatory on 24 January 1914. The carbonaceous C-type asteroid (Cb) has a rotation period of 12.8 hours. It was named after Johannes Gutenberg (ca. 1400–1468), who introduced the printing press to Europe and started the Printing Revolution.

== Orbit and classification ==
Gutemberga is a non-family asteroid of the main belt's background population when applying the hierarchical clustering method to its proper orbital elements. It orbits the Sun in the outer asteroid belt at a distance of 2.9–3.6 AU once every 5 years and 10 months (2,119 days; semi-major axis of 3.23 AU). Its orbit has an eccentricity of 0.11 and an inclination of 13° with respect to the ecliptic. The body's observation arc begins at Heidelberg on 22 December 1924, almost 11 years after its official discovery observation.

== Naming ==
This minor planet was named after Johannes Gutenberg (ca. 1400–1468), a German inventor who started the Printing Revolution with the introduction of mechanical movable type printing. Gutenberg lived and died in Mainz and the neighboring Eltville am Rhein. The naming was mentioned in The Names of the Minor Planets by Paul Herget in 1955 (H 78). The crater Gutenberg on the Moon and the feature Rimae Gutenberg, a 223-kilometer long groove near the crater, were also named after him.

== Physical characteristics ==
In the Tholen-like taxonomy of the Small Solar System Objects Spectroscopic Survey (S3OS2), Gutemberga is a common, carbonaceous C-type asteroid. In the Bus–Binzel SMASS-like taxonomic variant of the S3OS2, it is a Cb-subtype, which transitions from the C-type to the somewhat brighter B-type asteroid.

=== Rotation period ===
In January 218, a rotational lightcurve of Gutemberga was obtained from photometric observations by Tom Polakis at the Command Module Observatory (V02) in Arizona. Lightcurve analysis gave a well-defined rotation period of 12.838±0.006 hours with a brightness variation of 0.28±0.02 magnitude (U=3).

The result supersedes observations by Otmar Nickel of Astronomical Consortium of Mainz from February 2001, which gave a period of 12.88 hours with an amplitude of 0.25 magnitude (U=2), (Note: Lightcurve of (777) Gutemberga, taken by Otmar Nickel of the Astronomische Arbeitsgemeinschaft Mainz e. V. in 2011 (AAG Mainz). Rotation period 12.88 hours with a brightness amplitude of 0.25 mag. Quality code is 2. Summary figures for at the LCDB.) and observations by Astronomers at the Palomar Transient Factory in California, with a period of 12.849±0.0081 hours and an amplitude of 0.15 magnitude.(U=2).

=== Diameter and albedo ===
According to the surveys carried out by the Japanese Akari satellite, the Infrared Astronomical Satellite IRAS, and the NEOWISE mission of NASA's Wide-field Infrared Survey Explorer, Gutemberga measures (65.37±1.03), (65.57±1.9) and (71.749±0.095) kilometers in diameter and its surface has an albedo of (0.050±0.002), (0.0494±0.003) and (0.042±0.006), respectively.

The Collaborative Asteroid Lightcurve Link derives an albedo of 0.0494 and a diameter of 65.57 kilometers based on an absolute magnitude of 9.8. Alternative mean-diameter measurements published by the WISE team include (67.67±1.16 km) and (78.646±0.737 km) with corresponding albedos of (0.051±0.009) and (0.0343±0.0029). On 27 June 2008, an asteroid occultation of Gutemberga gave a best-fit ellipse dimension of (66.0 km × 66.0 km), with a poor quality rating of 1. These timed observations are taken when the asteroid passes in front of a distant star.
