= 788 Hohensteina =

Main-belt asteroid

Discovery
- Discovered by: Franz Kaiser
- Discovery site: Heidelberg-Königstuhl State Observatory
- Discovery date: 28 April 1914

Designations
- Pronunciation: /ˌhoʊənˈstaɪnə/
- Named after: Hohenstein
- Alternative designations: 1914 UR
- Minor planet category: Main belt
- Adjectives: Hohensteinian

Orbital characteristics
- Epoch 31 July 2016 (JD 2457600.5)
- Uncertainty parameter 0
- Observation arc: 101.75 yr (37166 d)
- Aphelion: 3.54161 AU (529.817 Gm)
- Perihelion: 2.71025 AU (405.448 Gm)
- Semi-major axis: 3.12593 AU (467.632 Gm)
- Eccentricity: 0.132977
- Orbital period (sidereal): 5.53 yr (2018.7 d)
- Mean anomaly: 172.396°
- Mean motion: 0° 10^{m} 42.002^{s} / day
- Inclination: 14.3373°
- Longitude of ascending node: 177.840°
- Argument of perihelion: 48.4689°

Physical characteristics
- Mean diameter: 114.68±6.38 km (composite estimate); 111.295±0.783 km 103.68±3.4 km
- Mass: (8.8±3.9)×10^{17} kg (Note: Calculated from its standard gravitational parameter GM = 0.059±0.026 km^{3}/s^{2}.)
- Mean density: 1.22 g/cm^{3} (Note: Assuming a diameter of 111 km.)
- Synodic rotation period: 37.176±0.004 h; 29.94 h (1.248 d)
- Geometric albedo: 0.041±0.004; 0.0787±0.005
- Spectral type: C
- Absolute magnitude (H): 8.3; 8.78

788 Hohensteina is a main-belt asteroid that was discovered on 4 April 1914. The discovery was made by Franz Kaiser at Heidelberg-Königstuhl State Observatory. It was named for castle Hohenstein, which is located in the Taunus mountains.
