= 717 Wisibada =

Main-belt asteroid

Discovery
- Discovered by: F. Kaiser
- Discovery site: Heidelberg Obs.
- Discovery date: 26 August 1911

Designations
- Pronunciation: /vɪzɪˈbeɪdə/
- Named after: Wiesbaden (German city)
- Alternative designations: A911 QK · 1911 MJ
- Minor planet category: main-belt · (outer); background

Orbital characteristics
- Epoch 31 May 2020 (JD 2459000.5)
- Uncertainty parameter 0
- Observation arc: 108.68 yr (39,695 d)
- Aphelion: 3.9650 AU
- Perihelion: 2.3124 AU
- Semi-major axis: 3.1387 AU
- Eccentricity: 0.2633
- Orbital period (sidereal): 5.56 yr (2,031 d)
- Mean anomaly: 150.82°
- Mean motion: 0° 10^{m} 37.92^{s} / day
- Inclination: 1.6463°
- Longitude of ascending node: 343.55°
- Argument of perihelion: 24.403°

Physical characteristics
- Mean diameter: 27.294±0.444 km; 31.04±4.7 km; 32.52±0.37 km
- Synodic rotation period: 1250 h
- Geometric albedo: 0.061±0.002; 0.0666±0.026; 0.086±0.009
- Spectral type: Tholen = DX: B–V = 0.701±0.061; U–B = 0.242±0.073
- Absolute magnitude (H): 10.9; 11.10

717 Wisibada (prov. designation: A911 QK or 1911 MJ) is a dark background asteroid from the outer regions of the asteroid belt. It was discovered on 26 August 1911, by German astronomer Franz Kaiser at the Heidelberg-Königstuhl State Observatory in southwest Germany. It was named after the discoverer's birthplace, the city of Wiesbaden in Hesse, Germany.

== Orbit and classification ==
Wisibada is a non-family asteroid of the main belt's background population when applying the hierarchical clustering method to its proper orbital elements. It orbits the Sun in the outer asteroid belt at a distance of 2.3–4.0 AU once every 5 years and 7 months (2,031 days; semi-major axis of 3.14 AU). Its orbit has an eccentricity of 0.26 and an inclination of 2° with respect to the ecliptic. The body's observation arc begins at Vienna Observatory on 22 August 1922, or one year after its official discovery observation at the Heidelberg Observatory.

== Naming ==
This minor planet was named by the discoverer Franz Kaiser after his birthplace, the city of Wiesbaden in Hesse, Germany. Kaiser also named asteroid 765 Mattiaca after Wiesbaden using the city's Latin name, Aquae Mattiacorum, which means "Waters of the Mattiaci". The naming citation was mentioned in The Names of the Minor Planets by Paul Herget in 1955 (H 72).

== Physical characteristics ==
In the Tholen classification, Wisibada's spectral type is closest to a dark D-type asteroid, and somewhat similar to an X-type asteroid, though with a noisy spectrum (DX:).

=== Rotation period ===
This object rotates with a period of 1250 hours, making it a slow rotator. This is one of the slowest rotating minor planets known to exist, and was formerly one of the lowest-numbered minor planets with an undetermined rotation period.

=== Diameter and albedo ===
According to the surveys carried out by the NEOWISE mission of NASA's Wide-field Infrared Survey Explorer (WISE), the Infrared Astronomical Satellite IRAS, and the Japanese Akari satellite, Wisibada measures (27.294±0.444 km), (31.04±4.7 km) and (32.52±0.37 km) kilometers in diameter and its surface has an albedo of (0.086±0.009), (0.0666±0.026) and (0.061±0.002), respectively. The Collaborative Asteroid Lightcurve Link derives an albedo of 0.0796 and a diameter of 31.12 kilometers based on an absolute magnitude of 10.9. Alternative mean-diameters published by the WISE team include (27.656±0.202 km) and (28.670±0.332 km) with a corresponding albedo of (0.086±0.009) and (0.0783±0.0134).
