= 746 Marlu =

Asteroid

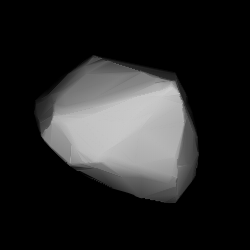
- Modelled shape of Marlu from its lightcurve

Discovery
- Discovered by: F. Kaiser
- Discovery site: Heidelberg Obs.
- Discovery date: 1 March 1913

Designations
- Named after: Marie-Louise Kaiser (Discoverer's daughter)
- Alternative designations: A913 EJ · 1926 WA; 1975 XN · 1913 QY
- Minor planet category: main-belt · (outer); background

Orbital characteristics
- Epoch 31 May 2020 (JD 2459000.5)
- Uncertainty parameter 0
- Observation arc: 104.37 yr (38,122 d)
- Aphelion: 3.8461 AU
- Perihelion: 2.3728 AU
- Semi-major axis: 3.1094 AU
- Eccentricity: 0.2369
- Orbital period (sidereal): 5.48 yr (2,003 d)
- Mean anomaly: 60.352°
- Mean motion: 0° 10^{m} 47.28^{s} / day
- Inclination: 17.480°
- Longitude of ascending node: 1.9385°
- Argument of perihelion: 306.79°

Physical characteristics
- Dimensions: 72.0 km × 65.0 km
- Mean diameter: 69.75±4.0 km; 71.55±1.41 km; 74.274±1.122 km
- Synodic rotation period: 7.787 h
- Pole ecliptic latitude: (202.0°, −66.0°) (λ_{1}/β_{1}); (64.0°, −27.0°) (λ_{2}/β_{2})
- Geometric albedo: 0.032±0.007; 0.036±0.002; 0.0363±0.005
- Spectral type: Tholen = P; P (S3OS2-TH); C (S3OS2-BB); C (SDSS-MOC); B–V = 0.726±0.028; U–B = 0.283±0.050
- Absolute magnitude (H): 9.8; 10.00

746 Marlu (prov. designation: A913 EJ or 1913 QY) is a dark and large background asteroid from the outer regions of the asteroid belt, approximately 72 kilometers (45 miles) in diameter. It was discovered on 1 March 1913, by German astronomer Franz Kaiser at the Heidelberg Observatory in southwest Germany. The primitive P-type asteroid has a rotation period of 7.8 hours. It was named after the discoverer's daughter, Marie-Louise Kaiser.

== Orbit and classification ==
Marlu is a non-family asteroid of the main belt's background population when applying the hierarchical clustering method to its proper orbital elements. It orbits the Sun in the outer asteroid belt at a distance of 2.4–3.8 AU once every 5 years and 6 months (2,003 days; semi-major axis of 3.11 AU). Its orbit has an eccentricity of 0.24 and an inclination of 17° with respect to the ecliptic. The body's observation arc begins at Heidelberg on 12 September 1915, more than two years after its official discovery observation.

== Naming ==
Franz Kaiser named this minor planet after his daughter, the physician Marie-Louise Kaiser. The discoverer also named another asteroid, 743 Eugenisis, in honor of his daughter. The naming was mentioned in The Names of the Minor Planets by Paul Herget in 1955 (H 75).

== Physical characteristics ==
In the Tholen classification, Marlu is a dark and primitive P-type asteroid, while it is an X-type and P-type asteroid, in the Tholen- and SMASS-like taxonomic variant of the Small Solar System Objects Spectroscopic Survey (S3OS2), respectively. P-type asteroids are common in the outer asteroid belt and among the Jupiter trojan population. In the Moving Object Catalog (MOC) of the Sloan Digital Sky Survey, however, Marlu is a common carbonaceous C-type asteroid.

=== Rotation period and poles ===
In September 1981, a rotational lightcurve of Marlu was obtained from photometric observations by American astronomer Alan W. Harris. Lightcurve analysis gave a rotation period of 7.787 hours with a brightness variation of 0.23 magnitude (U=2). In October 2014, Daniel A. Klinglesmith confirmed the exact same period of (7.787±0.001 h) hours with an amplitude of (0.22±0.01) magnitude (U=3).

In 2016, a modeled lightcurve gave a concurring sidereal period of 7.78887±0.00005 hours using data from a large collaboration of individual observers. The study also determined two spin axes of (202.0°, −66.0°) and (64.0°, −27.0°) in ecliptic coordinates (λ, β).

=== Diameter and albedo ===
According to the surveys carried out by the Infrared Astronomical Satellite IRAS, the Japanese Akari satellite, and the NEOWISE mission of NASA's Wide-field Infrared Survey Explorer (WISE), Marlu measures (69.75±4.0), (71.55±1.41) and (74.274±1.122) kilometers in diameter and its surface has a low albedo of 0.0363±0.005), (0.036±0.002) and (0.032±0.007), respectively.

The Collaborative Asteroid Lightcurve Link adopts an albedo of 0.0431 and derives a diameter of 69.87 kilometers based on an absolute magnitude of 9.81. The WISE-team also published two alternative mean-diameters of (70.00±19.03 km) and (78.34±21.54 km) with a corresponding albedo of (0.04±0.01) and (0.04±0.05). An asteroid occultation on 1 May 1985, gave a best-fit ellipse dimension of (72.0 km × 65.0 km) with an intermediate quality rating of 2. These timed observations are taken when the asteroid passes in front of a distant star.
