= Guy Reiss =

French astronomer (1904–1964)

Minor planets discovered: 5
1213 Algeria	5 December 1931	MPC
1237 Geneviève	2 December 1931	MPC
1299 Mertona	18 January 1934	MPC
1300 Marcelle	10 February 1934	MPC
1376 Michelle	29 October 1935	MPC

Guy Reiss (1904–1964) was a French astronomer and discoverer of five asteroids, who worked at the Algiers Observatory in Algiers, North Africa, during the 1930s and later at the Nice Observatory in southeastern France.

Among his discoveries made between 1931 and 1935 at Algiers, he named the minor planets 1237 Geneviève, 1300 Marcelle and 1376 Michelle after his three daughters. His first discovery, 1213 Algeria, was named in honour of the North African country, location of the discovering observatory, and a French colony at the time. The asteroid 1299 Mertona was named after English astronomer Gerald Merton, who became president of the British Astronomical Association in the 1950s.

In 1935, he received the Damoiseau-Prize together with André Patry from the French Academy of Sciences for the whole of their work. The minor planet 1577 Reiss, discovered by his college astronomer Louis Boyer at Algiers Observatory in the 1940s, was named in his honour.
