= 763 Cupido =

Main-belt asteroid

Discovery
- Discovered by: F. Kaiser
- Discovery site: Heidelberg Obs.
- Discovery date: 25 September 1913

Designations
- Pronunciation: /kjuːˈpaɪdoʊ/
- Named after: Cupid (Latin: Cupīdō) (Roman god)
- Alternative designations: A913 SE · 1933 TA; 1958 AF · 1913 ST
- Minor planet category: main-belt · (inner); Flora · background
- Adjectives: Cupidinian /kjuːpɪˈdɪniən/

Orbital characteristics
- Epoch 31 May 2020 (JD 2459000.5)
- Uncertainty parameter 0
- Observation arc: 106.59 yr (38,932 d)
- Aphelion: 2.6136 AU
- Perihelion: 1.8693 AU
- Semi-major axis: 2.2415 AU
- Eccentricity: 0.1660
- Orbital period (sidereal): 3.36 yr (1,226 d)
- Mean anomaly: 279.59°
- Mean motion: 0° 17^{m} 37.32^{s} / day
- Inclination: 4.0828°
- Longitude of ascending node: 289.82°
- Argument of perihelion: 88.860°

Physical characteristics
- Mean diameter: 7.005±0.115 km
- Synodic rotation period: 151.5±0.1 h
- Geometric albedo: 0.373±0.072
- Spectral type: SL (SDSS-MOC)
- Absolute magnitude (H): 12.50; 12.6

763 Cupido (prov. designation: A913 SE or 1913 ST) is a Flora asteroid, tumbler and slow rotator from the inner regions of the asteroid belt, approximately 7 kilometers (4.3 miles) in diameter. It was discovered on 25 September 1913, by German astronomer Franz Kaiser at the Heidelberg-Königstuhl State Observatory in southwest Germany. The S/L-type asteroid has an exceptionally long rotation period of 151 hours. It was named by its Latin name after Cupid, the Roman god of erotic love, attraction and affection.

== Orbit and classification ==
When applying the synthetic hierarchical clustering method (HCM) by Nesvorný, or the 1995 HCM-analysis by Zappalà, Cupido is a member of the Flora family (402), a giant asteroid family and the largest family of stony asteroids in the main-belt. However, according to another HCM-analysis by Milani and Knežević (AstDys), it is a background asteroid as this analysis does not recognize the Flora asteroid clan. Cupido orbits the Sun in the inner asteroid belt at a distance of 1.9–2.6 AU once every 3 years and 4 months (1,226 days; semi-major axis of 2.24 AU). Its orbit has an eccentricity of 0.17 and an inclination of 4° with respect to the ecliptic. The body's observation arc begins at Yerkes Observatory (754) in September 1933, or 20 years after to its official discovery observation by Franz Kaiser at Heidelberg Observatory in 1913.

== Naming ==
This minor planet was named "Cupido", the Latin name of Cupid, god of erotic love, attraction and affection in Roman mythology whose Greek counterpart is Eros (also see asteroid 433 Eros). Cupido was named due to its relative proximity to the Sun probably by Swedish astronomer Bror Ansgar Asplind (1890–1954) who was honored by asteroid 958 Asplinda. The naming was mentioned in The Names of the Minor Planets by Paul Herget in 1955 (H 76).

== Physical characteristics ==
In the SDSS-based taxonomy, Cupido is an SL-type that transitions from the common, stony S-type asteroids to the uncommon L-type asteroids.

=== Rotation period ===
In October 2017, a rotational lightcurve of Cupido was obtained from photometric observations by American astronomer Frederick Pilcher in collaboration with Vladimir Benishek at Belgrade Observatory and Daniel A. Klinglesmith at Etscorn Observatory (719). Lightcurve analysis gave a rotation period of 151.5±0.1 hours with a brightness variation of 0.45±0.10 magnitude (U=3-). The observations also showed that it is a tumbling asteroid, which wobbles on its non-principal axis rotation. During the same opposition, Tom Polakis at the Command Module Observatory (V02) also observed the asteroid and measured a period of 151.1±0.1 hours and an amplitude of 0.24±0.02 magnitude (U=2+). The results supersede a tentative period determination of 14.88 hours by René Roy from 2005.

=== Diameter and albedo ===
According to the survey carried out by the NEOWISE mission of NASA's Wide-field Infrared Survey Explorer (WISE), Cupido measures (7.005±0.115) kilometers in diameter and its surface has an albedo of (0.373±0.072). Other publications by the WISE team give a mean diameter of (7.38±1.57 km), (7.644±0.067 km) and (7.76±0.30 km) with a corresponding albedo of (0.33±0.14), (0.3037±0.0529) and (0.322±0.046), respectively. The Collaborative Asteroid Lightcurve Link assumes a standard albedo for a Flora asteroid of 0.20 and calculates a diameter of 8.97 kilometers based on an absolute magnitude of 12.6.
