= 742 Edisona =

Main-belt asteroid

Discovery
- Discovered by: Franz Kaiser
- Discovery site: Heidelberg
- Discovery date: 23 February 1913

Designations
- Named after: Thomas Edison (American inventor)
- Alternative designations: 1913 QU

Orbital characteristics
- Epoch 31 July 2016 (JD 2457600.5)
- Uncertainty parameter 0
- Observation arc: 102.98 yr (37,612 d)
- Aphelion: 3.3678 AU (503.82 Gm)
- Perihelion: 2.6535 AU (396.96 Gm)
- Semi-major axis: 3.0107 AU (450.39 Gm)
- Eccentricity: 0.11862
- Orbital period (sidereal): 5.22 yr (1,908.1 d)
- Mean anomaly: 65.177°
- Mean motion: 0° 11^{m} 19.212^{s} / day
- Inclination: 11.219°
- Longitude of ascending node: 64.214°
- Argument of perihelion: 284.294°
- Earth MOID: 1.67537 AU (250.632 Gm)
- Jupiter MOID: 2.11567 AU (316.500 Gm)
- T_{Jupiter}: 3.210

Physical characteristics
- Mean radius: 22.80±1.75 km
- Synodic rotation period: 18.52 h (0.772 d)
- Geometric albedo: 0.1286±0.022
- Absolute magnitude (H): 9.55

742 Edisona is a minor planet, specifically an asteroid orbiting in the asteroid belt that was discovered by German astronomer Franz Kaiser on 23 February 1913. It was named for inventor Thomas Edison. This asteroid is orbiting 3.01 AU with a period of 5.22 years and an eccentricity of 0.119. The orbital plane is inclined at an angle of 11.2° to the plane of the ecliptic. This is a member of the dynamic Eos family of asteroids that most likely formed as the result of a collisional breakup of a parent body.

Photometric observations made during 2008 were used to produce a light curve of 742 Edisona showing a rotation period of 18.52±0.01 with a brightness variation of 0.30±0.01 in magnitude. It spans a girth of approximately 45.6 km.
