= 864 Aase =

S-type minor planet

Discovery
- Discovered by: K. Reinmuth
- Discovery site: Heidelberg
- Discovery date: 30 September 1921

Designations
- Pronunciation: English: /ˈɔːsə/ AW-sə; Norwegian: [ˈôːsə]
- Alternative designations: A921 SB; 1944 RC; 1967 RA1; 1970 PC

Orbital characteristics
- Epoch 31 July 2016 (JD 2457600.5)
- Uncertainty parameter 0
- Observation arc: 94.55 yr (34533 days)
- Aphelion: 2.6300 AU (393.44 Gm)
- Perihelion: 1.7863 AU (267.23 Gm)
- Semi-major axis: 2.2081 AU (330.33 Gm)
- Eccentricity: 0.19102
- Orbital period (sidereal): 3.28 yr (1198.5 d)
- Mean anomaly: 327.686°
- Mean motion: 0° 18^{m} 1.332^{s} / day
- Inclination: 5.4506°
- Longitude of ascending node: 163.155°
- Argument of perihelion: 193.982°
- Earth MOID: 0.781473 AU (116.9067 Gm)
- Jupiter MOID: 2.80382 AU (419.446 Gm)
- T_{Jupiter}: 3.630

Physical characteristics
- Mean diameter: 7.25±0.35 km
- Synodic rotation period: 3.2329 h (0.13470 d)
- Absolute magnitude (H): 12.87

864 Aase is an S-type asteroid belonging to the Flora family in the Main Belt.

The object A917 CB discovered 13 February 1917, by Max Wolf was named 864 Aase, and the object 1926 XB discovered 7 December 1926, by Karl Reinmuth was named 1078 Mentha. In 1958 it was established that these were one and the same object. In 1974, this was resolved by keeping the name 1078 Mentha and reusing the name and number 864 Aase for the object 1921 KE, discovered 30 September 1921, by Karl Reinmuth. Aase refers to Åse, the mother of Peer Gynt, the character from Henrik Ibsen's play Peer Gynt.
