= Franz Kaiser =

German astronomer

Minor planets discovered: 21
717 Wisibada	August 26, 1911
720 Bohlinia	October 18, 1911
721 Tabora	October 18, 1911
738 Alagasta	January 7, 1913
742 Edisona	February 23, 1913
743 Eugenisis	February 25, 1913
745 Mauritia	March 1, 1913
746 Marlu	March 1, 1913
759 Vinifera	August 26, 1913
760 Massinga	August 28, 1913
761 Brendelia	September 8, 1913
763 Cupido	September 25, 1913
764 Gedania	September 26, 1913
765 Mattiaca	September 26, 1913
766 Moguntia	September 29, 1913
773 Irmintraud	December 22, 1913
777 Gutemberga	January 24, 1914
778 Theobalda	January 25, 1914
786 Bredichina	April 20, 1914
788 Hohensteina	April 28, 1914
1265 Schweikarda	October 18, 1911

Franz Heinrich Kaiser (25 April 1891 – 13 March 1962) was a German astronomer.

He worked at the Heidelberg-Königstuhl Observatory from 1911 to 1914 while working on his Ph.D. there, which he obtained in 1915. During this time, Heidelberg was a center of asteroid discovery, and Kaiser discovered 21 asteroids during his time there.

The outer main-belt asteroid 3183 Franzkaiser was named in his memory on 1 September 1993 (M.P.C. 22497).
