= 778 Theobalda =

Main-belt asteroid

Discovery
- Discovered by: Franz Kaiser
- Discovery site: Heidelberg
- Discovery date: 25 January 1914

Designations
- Pronunciation: /θiːoʊˈbɔːldə/
- Alternative designations: 1914 UA
- Minor planet category: main belt, Theobalda family

Orbital characteristics
- Epoch 31 July 2016 (JD 2457600.5)
- Uncertainty parameter 0
- Observation arc: 92.58 yr (33816 d)
- Aphelion: 3.9839 AU (595.98 Gm)
- Perihelion: 2.3909 AU (357.67 Gm)
- Semi-major axis: 3.1874 AU (476.83 Gm)
- Eccentricity: 0.24990
- Orbital period (sidereal): 5.69 yr (2078.5 d)
- Mean anomaly: 24.214°
- Mean motion: 0° 10^{m} 23.52^{s} / day
- Inclination: 13.687°
- Longitude of ascending node: 321.708°
- Time of perihelion: 2027-Jul-23
- Argument of perihelion: 134.392°
- Earth MOID: 1.42779 AU (213.594 Gm)
- Jupiter MOID: 1.30066 AU (194.576 Gm)
- T_{Jupiter}: 3.105

Physical characteristics
- Mean radius: 32.03±0.95 km
- Synodic rotation period: 11.659 h (0.4858 d)
- Geometric albedo: 0.0589±0.004
- Apparent magnitude: 12.79 to 16.89
- Absolute magnitude (H): 9.66

778 Theobalda is a minor planet orbiting the Sun, in the main asteroid belt. It was discovered by Franz Kaiser on 25 January 1914 and was named after his father, Theobald Kaiser. This is an F-type asteroid that spans ~64 km in girth. It rotates on its axis once every 11.7 hours. 778 Theobalda is orbiting 3.19 AU from the Sun with an eccentricity (ovalness) of 0.25 and a period of 5.69 yr. The orbital plane is inclined at an angle of 13.7° to the plane of the ecliptic. Theobalda reached opposition on 12 October 2026.

778 Theobalda is the namesake and largest member of a family of 128 minor planets in the outer belt. The Theobalda asteroid family was likely formed 6.9±2.3 million years ago from a collision-shattered parent body that had a diameter of around 78±9 km.
