= 745 Mauritia =

Dark background asteroid

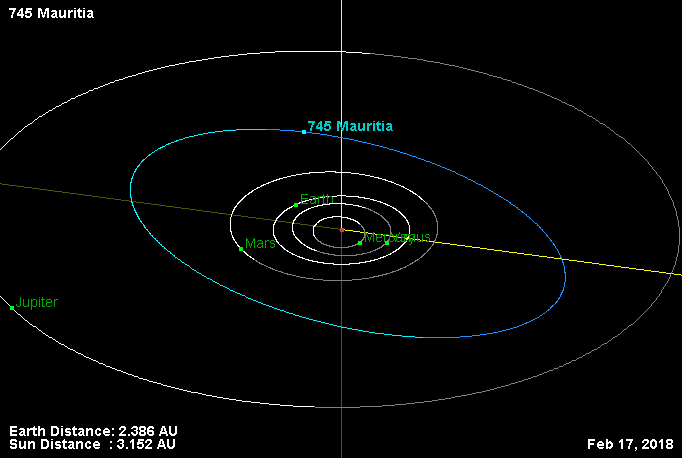
- 745 Mauritia's orbit relative to those of the inner planets and Jupiter

Discovery
- Discovered by: F. Kaiser
- Discovery site: Heidelberg Obs.
- Discovery date: 1 March 1913

Designations
- Pronunciation: /mɒˈrɪʃ(i)ə/
- Named after: Saint Maurice (Christian martyr)
- Alternative designations: A913 EH · 1972 BM; 1913 QX
- Minor planet category: main-belt · (outer); background

Orbital characteristics
- Epoch 31 May 2020 (JD 2459000.5)
- Uncertainty parameter 0
- Observation arc: 107.16 yr (39,139 d)
- Aphelion: 3.3943 AU
- Perihelion: 3.1332 AU
- Semi-major axis: 3.2638 AU
- Eccentricity: 0.0400
- Orbital period (sidereal): 5.90 yr (2,154 d)
- Mean anomaly: 104.57°
- Mean motion: 0° 10^{m} 1.92^{s} / day
- Inclination: 13.324°
- Longitude of ascending node: 125.68°
- Argument of perihelion: 26.747°

Physical characteristics
- Mean diameter: 23.23±1.38 km; 24.711±0.288 km
- Synodic rotation period: 9.945±0.001 h (Note: Lightcurve-plot of (745) Mauritia, by Frederick Pilcher at the Organ Mesa Observatory (2013). Rotation period 9.945±0.001 hours with a brightness amplitude of 0.12±0.02 mag. Quality code is 3. Summary figures at the LCDB and ALSC websites.)
- Geometric albedo: 0.200±0.023; 0.249±0.032
- Spectral type: C (assumed)
- Absolute magnitude (H): 10.30; 10.40; 10.5

745 Mauritia (prov. designation: A913 EH or 1913 QX) is a dark background asteroid from the outer regions of the asteroid belt, approximately 24 kilometers (15 miles) in diameter. It was discovered on 1 March 1913, by German astronomer Franz Kaiser at the Heidelberg-Königstuhl State Observatory in Germany. The presumed carbonaceous C-type asteroid has a rotation period of 9.9 hours. It was named after Saint Maurice, patron of the Saint Mauritius church in the city of Wiesbaden, where the discoverer was born.

== Orbit and classification ==
Mauritia is a non-family asteroid of the main belt's background population when applying the hierarchical clustering method to its proper orbital elements. It orbits the Sun in the outer asteroid belt at a distance of 3.1–3.4 AU once every 5 years and 11 months (2,154 days; semi-major axis of 3.26 AU). Its orbit has an eccentricity of 0.04 and an inclination of 13° with respect to the ecliptic. The body's observation arc begins at Heidelberg on 3 January 1918, almost five years after its official discovery observation.

== Naming ==
This minor planet was named after 3rd-century Christian martyr Saint Maurice, who is the patron of the St. Mauritius (Wiesbaden) church in Wiesbaden, Germany, where the discoverer was born (also see 717 Wisibada). The Swiss village Saint-Maurice, where he died in AD 287 is also named after Saint Maurice. The naming citation was mentioned in The Names of the Minor Planets by Paul Herget in 1955 (H 75).

== Physical characteristics ==
Mauritia is an assumed, carbonaceous C-type asteroid due to its low albedo (see below) and its location in the outer asteroid belt. However, D-type and P-type asteroids fulfill the location and albedo-based criteria as well.

=== Rotation period ===
In March 2013, a first rotational lightcurve of Mauritia was obtained from photometric observations over six nights by Frederick Pilcher at the Organ Mesa Observatory (G50) in New Mexico, United States. Lightcurve analysis gave a well-defined rotation period of 9.945±0.001 hours with a brightness variation of 0.12±0.02 magnitude (U=3).

=== Diameter and albedo ===
According to the surveys carried out by the Japanese Akari satellite and the NEOWISE mission of NASA's Wide-field Infrared Survey Explorer (WISE), Mauritia measures (23.23±1.38) and (24.711±0.288) kilometers in diameter and its surface has an albedo of (0.249±0.032) and (0.200±0.023), respectively. The Collaborative Asteroid Lightcurve Link assumes a standard albedo for a carbonaceous asteroid of 0.057 and calculates a diameter of 44.22 kilometers based on an absolute magnitude of 10.5. The WISE team also published an alternative mean diameter of (27.004±0.348 km) with an albedo of (0.1696±0.0062).
