= 1237 Geneviève =

Main-belt asteroid

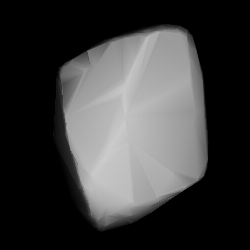
- Shape model of Geneviève from its lightcurve

Discovery
- Discovered by: G. Reiss
- Discovery site: Algiers Obs.
- Discovery date: 2 December 1931

Designations
- Named after: Geneviève Reiss (daughter of discoverer)
- Alternative designations: 1931 XB · 1929 GA; 1984 MM · A908 HA
- Minor planet category: main-belt · (middle); background

Orbital characteristics
- Epoch 4 September 2017 (JD 2458000.5)
- Uncertainty parameter 0
- Observation arc: 109.09 yr (39,846 days)
- Aphelion: 2.8142 AU
- Perihelion: 2.4107 AU
- Semi-major axis: 2.6125 AU
- Eccentricity: 0.0772
- Orbital period (sidereal): 4.22 yr (1,542 days)
- Mean anomaly: 169.28°
- Mean motion: 0° 14^{m} 0.24^{s} / day
- Inclination: 9.7349°
- Longitude of ascending node: 57.868°
- Argument of perihelion: 305.88°

Physical characteristics
- Dimensions: 30.85±6.64 km 37.26±11.83 km 39.74 km (derived); 39.81±1.1 km (IRAS:20); 40.67±0.61 km 42.987±4.138 km
- Synodic rotation period: 16.37±0.10 h 24.82±0.07 h
- Geometric albedo: 0.0413±0.0070; 0.0484 (derived); 0.057±0.002; 0.0585±0.003 (IRAS:20); 0.06±0.04; 0.07±0.14
- Spectral type: S/C; B–V = 0.610; U–B = 0.250
- Absolute magnitude (H): 10.7 · 10.8 · 10.84 · 10.91

1237 Geneviève (prov. designation: 1931 XB) is a background asteroid from the central region of the asteroid belt, approximately 38 kilometers (24 miles) in diameter. It was discovered on 2 December 1931, by French astronomer Guy Reiss at the Algerian Algiers Observatory in North Africa. The discoverer named it after his daughter Geneviève Reiss.

== Orbit and classification ==
Geneviève is a non-family asteroid of the main belt's background population when applying the hierarchical clustering method to its proper orbital elements. It orbits the Sun in the central main-belt at a distance of 2.4–2.8 AU once every 4 years and 3 months (1,542 days). Its orbit has an eccentricity of 0.08 and an inclination of 10° with respect to the ecliptic.

In 1908, it was first identified as A908 HA at Taunton Observatory (803). A few days later, Geneviève was also observed at the U.S. Naval Observatory, which extended the body's observation arc by 23 years prior to its official discovery observation at Algiers.

== Naming ==
This minor planet was named for the eldest daughter of the discoverer, Geneviève Reiss. The discoverer also named 1300 Marcelle and 1376 Michelle after his other two daughters. The official naming citation was mentioned in The Names of the Minor Planets by Paul Herget in 1955 (H 114).

== Physical characteristics ==
In May 1984, American astronomer Richard Binzel obtained a rotational lightcurve of Geneviève that gave a rotation period of 16.37 hours with a brightness variation of 0.23 magnitude (U=2). A divergent period of 24.82 hours with an amplitude of 0.07 magnitude was obtained from photometric observations by astronomer Raymond Poncy in April 2005 (U=2-).

According to the surveys carried out by the Infrared Astronomical Satellite IRAS, the Japanese Akari satellite, and NASA's Wide-field Infrared Survey Explorer with its subsequent NEOWISE mission, Geneviève measures between 30.85 and 40.67 kilometers in diameter, and its surface has an albedo between 0.057 and 0.07 (without preliminary results).

The Collaborative Asteroid Lightcurve Link (CALL) agrees with the results obtained by IRAS, and derives an albedo of 0.0484 and a diameter of 39.74 kilometers using an absolute magnitude of 10.91.
