= 1213 Algeria =

Carbonaceous asteroid

Discovery
- Discovered by: G. Reiss
- Discovery site: Algiers Obs.
- Discovery date: 5 December 1931

Designations
- Named after: Algeria (country)
- Alternative designations: 1931 XD
- Minor planet category: main-belt · (outer)

Orbital characteristics
- Epoch 16 February 2017 (JD 2457800.5)
- Uncertainty parameter 0
- Observation arc: 84.53 yr (30,873 days)
- Aphelion: 3.5408 AU
- Perihelion: 2.7442 AU
- Semi-major axis: 3.1425 AU
- Eccentricity: 0.1267
- Orbital period (sidereal): 5.57 yr (2,035 days)
- Mean anomaly: 168.11°
- Mean motion: 0° 10^{m} 36.84^{s} / day
- Inclination: 13.064°
- Longitude of ascending node: 271.54°
- Argument of perihelion: 108.60°

Physical characteristics
- Dimensions: 29.175±0.251; 30.189±0.239 km 30.6±3.1 km 31±3 km 33.08 km (derived); 33.20±4.7 km (IRAS:3); 33.51±0.78 km 34.46±0.67 km
- Synodic rotation period: 16 h
- Geometric albedo: 0.057±0.010; 0.0586 (derived); 0.06±0.01; 0.07±0.01; 0.076±0.003; 0.0767±0.027 (IRAS:3); 0.0934±0.0106
- Spectral type: C
- Absolute magnitude (H): 10.8; 11.1; 11.33±0.30

1213 Algeria (provisional designation 1931 XD) is a carbonaceous asteroid from the outer region of the asteroid belt, approximately 32 kilometers in diameter. Discovered by Guy Reiss at Algiers Observatory in 1931, it was named after the North African country of Algeria.

== Discovery ==
Algeria was discovered by French astronomer Guy Reiss at the North African Algiers Observatory on 5 December 1931. Three nights later, the body was independently discovered by Belgian–American astronomer George Van Biesbroeck at the U.S. Yerkes Observatory in Wisconsin.

A first precovery was taken at Yerkes Observatory, extending the Algeria's observation arc by just 16 days prior to its official discovery observation.

== Orbit and classification ==
The dark asteroid orbits the Sun in the outer main-belt at a distance of 2.7–3.5 AU once every 5 years and 7 months (2,035 days). Its orbit has an eccentricity of 0.13 and an inclination of 13° with respect to the ecliptic.

== Physical characteristics ==
=== Lightcurve ===
A rotational lightcurve of Algeria was obtained from photometric observations made by French amateur astronomer Claudine Rinner in August 2002. Lightcurve analysis gave a rotation period of 16 hours with a brightness variation of 0.19 magnitude (U=2).

=== Diameter and albedo ===
According to the space-based surveys carried out by the Infrared Astronomical Satellite IRAS, the Japanese Akari satellite, and NASA's Wide-field Infrared Survey Explorer with its subsequent NEOWISE mission, Algeria measures between 29.2 and 34.5 kilometers in diameter and its surface has an albedo in the range of 0.057 to 0.093.

The Collaborative Asteroid Lightcurve Link derives an albedo of 0.059 and a diameter of 33.1 kilometers with an absolute magnitude of 11.1, and characterizes it as a C-type asteroid.

== Naming ==
This minor planet was named in honour of the North African country Algeria, location of the discovering observatory and a French colony at the time. The official naming citation was mentioned in The Names of the Minor Planets by Paul Herget in 1955 (H 112).
