= 738 Alagasta =

Main-belt asteroid

Discovery
- Discovered by: Franz Kaiser
- Discovery site: Heidelberg
- Discovery date: 7 January 1913

Designations
- Pronunciation: /æləˈɡæstə/
- Named after: Gau-Algesheim
- Alternative designations: 1913 QO

Orbital characteristics
- Epoch 31 July 2016 (JD 2457600.5)
- Uncertainty parameter 0
- Observation arc: 103.3 yr (37,720 d)
- Aphelion: 3.2040 AU (479.31 Gm)
- Perihelion: 2.8698 AU (429.32 Gm)
- Semi-major axis: 3.0369 AU (454.31 Gm)
- Eccentricity: 0.055023
- Orbital period (sidereal): 5.29 yr (1,933.1 d)
- Mean anomaly: 146.545°
- Mean motion: 0° 11^{m} 10.428^{s} / day
- Inclination: 3.5344°
- Longitude of ascending node: 132.115°
- Argument of perihelion: 41.826°
- Earth MOID: 1.87517 AU (280.521 Gm)
- Jupiter MOID: 1.76226 AU (263.630 Gm)
- T_{Jupiter}: 3.236

Physical characteristics
- Mean diameter: 56 ± 6 km (pole solution 1); 54 ± 4 km (pole solution 2)
- Synodic rotation period: 17.8888 ± 0.0005 h (pole solution 1); 17.8889 ± 0.0006 h (pole solution 2)
- Pole ecliptic longitude: 67° ± 7° or 246° ± 10°
- Pole ecliptic latitude: −47° ± 5° or −41° ± 8°
- Geometric albedo: 0.0398±0.002
- Absolute magnitude (H): 10.13

738 Alagasta (/æləˈɡæstə/) is a main belt asteroid. It was discovered from Heidelberg on 7 January 1913 by German astronomer Franz Kaiser. The asteroid was named in honor of Gau-Algesheim, previously Alaghastesheim, which is the home city of the discoverer's family. This body is orbiting at a distance of 3.04 AU with a period of 5.29 years and an eccentricity of 0.055. The orbital plane is inclined at an angle of 3.53° to the plane of the ecliptic.

Photometric measurements made of the asteroid during 2015 produced a light curve that showed a rotation period of 18.86±0.01 h with a brightness variation of 0.11 in magnitude. The asteroid is roughly 63 km in diameter and has a low albedo.

== See also ==
- List of minor planets/701–800
- Meanings of minor planet names: 501–1000
