= 764 Gedania =

Main-belt asteroid

Discovery
- Discovered by: F. Kaiser
- Discovery site: Heidelberg Obs.
- Discovery date: 26 September 1913

Designations
- Pronunciation: /ɡɪˈdeɪniə/
- Named after: City of Gdańsk
- Alternative designations: A913 SF · A902 WD; A908 YE · A918 TA; 1913 SU
- Minor planet category: main-belt · (outer); background

Orbital characteristics
- Epoch 31 May 2020 (JD 2459000.5)
- Uncertainty parameter 0
- Observation arc: 117.43 yr (42,893 d)
- Aphelion: 3.5027 AU
- Perihelion: 2.9000 AU
- Semi-major axis: 3.2013 AU
- Eccentricity: 0.0941
- Orbital period (sidereal): 5.73 yr (2,092 d)
- Mean anomaly: 242.58°
- Mean motion: 0° 10^{m} 19.56^{s} / day
- Inclination: 10.018°
- Longitude of ascending node: 258.94°
- Argument of perihelion: 156.65°

Physical characteristics
- Mean diameter: 58.28±1.4 km; 64.338±14.27 km; 74.59±1.39 km
- Synodic rotation period: 24.9751±0.0007 h
- Geometric albedo: 0.052±0.002; 0.0608±0.03; 0.0840±0.004
- Spectral type: Tholen = C; Caa (S3OS2-TH); Ch (S3OS2-BB); B–V = 0.737±0.014; U–B = 0.400±0.043
- Absolute magnitude (H): 9.6; 9.7

764 Gedania (prov. designation: A913 SF or 1913 SU) is a large background asteroid from the outer regions of the asteroid belt, approximately 60 kilometers (37 miles) in diameter. It was discovered on 26 September 1913, by German astronomer Franz Kaiser at the Heidelberg-Königstuhl State Observatory in southwest Germany. The carbonaceous C-type asteroid has a rotation period of 24.98 hours. It was named after the Polish city of Gdańsk where the discoverer was an assistant at the observatory during the 1920s.

== Orbit and classification ==
Gedania is a non-family asteroid of the main belt's background population when applying the hierarchical clustering method to its proper orbital elements. It orbits the Sun in the outer asteroid belt at a distance of 2.9–3.5 AU once every 5 years and 9 months (2,092 days; semi-major axis of 3.2 AU). Its orbit has an eccentricity of 0.09 and an inclination of 10° with respect to the ecliptic. The body's observation arc begins with its first observation as A902 WD at Heidelberg Observatory in November 1902, almost 11 years prior to its official discovery observation by Franz Kaiser.

== Naming ==
This minor planet was named after the Latin name of the city of Gdańsk, Poland (formerly Free City of Danzig) where the discoverer, Franz Kaiser (1891–1962), was an assistant at the observatory during the early 1920s. The official naming citation was mentioned in The Names of the Minor Planets by Paul Herget in 1955 (H 77). Asteroid 1419 Danzig was also named by its German name for the city of Gdańsk.

== Physical characteristics ==
In the Tholen classification, Gedania is a common carbonaceous C-type asteroid. It has also been classified as a hydrated Ch-type and as a Caa type in the Tholen- and SMASS-like taxonomic variant of the Small Solar System Objects Spectroscopic Survey (S3OS2).

=== Rotation period ===
In February 2006, a rotational lightcurve of Gedania was obtained from photometric observations by collaborating astronomers Roberto Crippa, Federico Manzini (A12), René Roy, Donn Starkey, Raoul Behrend and Laurent Bernasconi. Lightcurve analysis gave a rotation period of 24.9751±0.0007 hours with a brightness variation of 0.35±0.01 magnitude (U=2). Observations by Aznar, Brinsfield and Pál, gave an alternative period determination of 19.16±0.04, 24.817±0.005 and 25.1172±0.0005 hours, respectively (U=2/2/2).

=== Diameter and albedo ===
According to the surveys carried out by the Infrared Astronomical Satellite IRAS, the NEOWISE mission of NASA's Wide-field Infrared Survey Explorer and the Japanese Akari satellite, Gedania measures 58.28±1.4, 64.338±14.27 and 74.59±1.39 kilometers in diameter and its surface has an albedo of 0.0840±0.004, 0.0608±0.03 and 0.052±0.002, respectively. The Collaborative Asteroid Lightcurve Link derives an albedo of 0.0754 and a diameter of 58.18 kilometers based on an absolute magnitude of 9.6. An alternative mean-diameter measurement published by the WISE team gave (66.30±18.01 km) with corresponding albedo of (0.04±0.05). On 5 February 2006, an asteroid occultation of Gedania gave a best-fit ellipse dimension of (58.0 km × 58.0 km), with a poor quality rating of 1. These timed observations are taken when the asteroid passes in front of a distant star.
