= 743 Eugenisis =

Main-belt asteroid

Discovery
- Discovered by: Franz Kaiser
- Discovery site: Heidelberg
- Discovery date: 25 February 1913

Designations
- Pronunciation: /juːˈdʒɛnɪsɪs/
- Alternative designations: 1913 QV

Orbital characteristics
- Epoch 31 July 2016 (JD 2457600.5)
- Uncertainty parameter 0
- Observation arc: 103.14 yr (37,671 d)
- Aphelion: 2.9573 AU (442.41 Gm)
- Perihelion: 2.6303 AU (393.49 Gm)
- Semi-major axis: 2.7938 AU (417.95 Gm)
- Eccentricity: 0.058524
- Orbital period (sidereal): 4.67 yr (1,705.7 d)
- Mean anomaly: 148.01°
- Mean motion: 0° 12^{m} 39.816^{s} / day
- Inclination: 4.8324°
- Longitude of ascending node: 228.976°
- Argument of perihelion: 187.320°
- Earth MOID: 1.64027 AU (245.381 Gm)
- Jupiter MOID: 2.27777 AU (340.750 Gm)
- T_{Jupiter}: 3.320

Physical characteristics
- Mean radius: 26.585±0.55 km
- Synodic rotation period: 10.23 h (0.426 d)
- Sidereal rotation period: 10.23 ± 0.01 h
- Geometric albedo: 0.0625±0.003
- Absolute magnitude (H): 10.3

743 Eugenisis is a minor planet orbiting the Sun that was discovered by German astronomer Franz Kaiser in 1913.

Photometric observations of this asteroid collected during 2004 show a rotation period of 10.23 ± 0.01 hours with a brightness variation of 0.20 ± 0.02 magnitude. The spectrum of this object matches the Ch class in the SMASS taxonomy, indicating a carbonaceous surface with a hydrous component.
