= 1078 Mentha =

Stony background asteroid

Discovery
- Discovered by: K. Reinmuth
- Discovery site: Heidelberg Obs.
- Discovery date: 7 December 1926

Designations
- Pronunciation: /ˈmɛnθə/
- Named after: Mentha (flowering plant)
- Alternative designations: 1926 XB& · 1951 CF_{1} 1952 LD · A917 CB; A924 EP
- Minor planet category: main-belt · (inner) background

Orbital characteristics
- Epoch 4 September 2017 (JD 2458000.5)
- Uncertainty parameter 0
- Observation arc: 93.66 yr (34,208 days)
- Aphelion: 2.5832 AU
- Perihelion: 1.9555 AU
- Semi-major axis: 2.2693 AU
- Eccentricity: 0.1383
- Orbital period (sidereal): 3.42 yr (1,249 days)
- Mean anomaly: 142.04°
- Mean motion: 0° 17^{m} 17.88^{s} / day
- Inclination: 7.3716°
- Longitude of ascending node: 93.851°
- Argument of perihelion: 43.568°

Physical characteristics
- Dimensions: 9.94±0.28 km 12.619±0.242 km 13.59±3.01 km 13.660±0.134 km 13.675 km 13.68 km (taken); 15.37±2.11 km
- Synodic rotation period: 82.870±0.2341 h 85±2 h
- Geometric albedo: 0.126±0.259; 0.1641; 0.1819±0.0375; 0.262±0.041; 0.31±0.18; 0.343±0.020
- Spectral type: Tholen = S B–V = 0.889; U–B = 0.490
- Absolute magnitude (H): 11.33±0.11 · 11.455±0.002 (R) · 11.60 · 11.80 · 11.9 · 11.9±0.2 · 11.94

1078 Mentha, provisional designation 1926 XB, is a stony background asteroid from the inner regions of the asteroid belt, approximately 13 kilometers in diameter. It was discovered on 7 December 1926, by astronomer Karl Reinmuth at the Heidelberg-Königstuhl State Observatory in southwest Germany. Only in 1958, it was realized that this object was a rediscovery of an already numbered but lost asteroid (864 Aase).

The asteroid was named after the flowering plant of the mint family, Mentha. It has a longer-than average spin rate of 85 hours and possibly an irregular, elongated shape.

== Identification with former lost asteroid ==
Sometimes, discovered objects turn out to be a rediscovery of a previously lost minor planet. This can be determined by calculating the "new" object's orbit (once it is firmly known) backwards and checking its past positions against those previously recorded for the lost object. Nowadays these identities between two objects are found before they are numbered.

In 1958, however, French astronomer André Patry at Nice Observatory found such identity between Mentha, 1926 XB, and the lost minor planet 864 Aase, A917 CB, which had never been re-observed after its discovery by Max Wolf in 1917. Since it was realized that Mentha and Aase were one and the same object, the Minor Planet Center resolved this conflict by keeping everything associated with "1078 Mentha", adding the two oppositional observations by Max Wolf from 1917, and completely vacated "864 Aase", reusing its name and number for another, unrelated discovery made by Reinmuth.

== Orbit and classification ==
Mentha is a non-family asteroid of the main belt's background population. It orbits the Sun in the inner asteroid belt at a distance of 2.0–2.6 AU once every 3 years and 5 months (1,249 days; semi-major axis of 2.27 AU). Its orbit has an eccentricity of 0.14 and an inclination of 7° with respect to the ecliptic.

The asteroid was first observed as A917 CB at Heidelberg in February 1907 (which is the original discovery of 864 Aase, before vacated). The body's observation arc begins at Simeiz Observatory in March 1924, almost four years prior to its official discovery observation at Heidelberg.

== Physical characteristics ==
In the Tholen classification, Mentha is a common stony S-type asteroid.

=== Rotation period ===
In February 1989, a first rotational lightcurve of Mentha was obtained from photometric observations by Polish astronomer Wiesław Wiśniewski. Lightcurve analysis gave a well-defined rotation period of 85 hours with a brightness variation of 0.87 magnitude (U=3). In February 2013, a similar period of 82.870 hours with an amplitude of 0.65 magnitude was measured by astronomers at the Palomar Transient Factory in California (U=2). A high brightness amplitude is typically indicative for an elongated rather than spherical shape. Its long period is close to that of slow rotators.

=== Diameter and albedo ===
According to the surveys carried out by the Japanese Akari satellite and the NEOWISE mission of NASA's Wide-field Infrared Survey Explorer, Mentha measures between 9.94 and 15.37 kilometers in diameter and its surface has an albedo between 0.126 and 0.343.

The Collaborative Asteroid Lightcurve Link agrees with Petr Pravec's revised WISE data and takes an albedo of 0.1641 and a diameter of 13.68 kilometers based on an absolute magnitude of 11.9.

== Naming ==
This minor planet was named after Mentha, a flowering herb of the mint family. The official naming citation was mentioned in The Names of the Minor Planets by Paul Herget in 1955 (H 102).

=== Reinmuth's flowers ===
Due to his many discoveries, Karl Reinmuth submitted a large list of 66 newly named asteroids in the early 1930s. The list covered his discoveries with numbers between (1009) and (1200). This list also contained a sequence of 28 asteroids, starting with 1054 Forsytia, that were all named after plants, in particular flowering plants (also see list of minor planets named after animals and plants).
