= 1300 Marcelle =

Carbonaceous asteroid from the middle region of the asteroid belt

Discovery
- Discovered by: G. Reiss
- Discovery site: Algiers Obs.
- Discovery date: 10 February 1934

Designations
- Named after: Marcelle Reiss (discoverer's daughter)
- Alternative designations: 1934 CL
- Minor planet category: main-belt · (middle)

Orbital characteristics
- Epoch 4 September 2017 (JD 2458000.5)
- Uncertainty parameter 0
- Observation arc: 83.13 yr (30,365 days)
- Aphelion: 2.7986 AU
- Perihelion: 2.7635 AU
- Semi-major axis: 2.7811 AU
- Eccentricity: 0.0063
- Orbital period (sidereal): 4.64 yr (1,694 days)
- Mean anomaly: 93.078°
- Mean motion: 0° 12^{m} 45^{s} / day
- Inclination: 9.5482°
- Longitude of ascending node: 82.943°
- Argument of perihelion: 326.67°

Physical characteristics
- Dimensions: 27.64 km (derived); 27.84±1.1 km 28.194±0.141 km 30.86±9.65 km 30.866±0.392 km 33.34±0.45 km 33.92±9.86 km 41.27±2.37 km
- Synodic rotation period: 12 h
- Geometric albedo: 0.029±0.012; 0.03±0.03; 0.04±0.03; 0.0637 (derived); 0.070±0.002; 0.0809±0.0121; 0.095±0.011; 0.0995±0.008
- Spectral type: SMASS = Cg · C
- Absolute magnitude (H): 10.9 · 11.4 · 11.48 · 11.51±0.36

1300 Marcelle, provisional designation 1934 CL, is a carbonaceous asteroid from the middle region of the asteroid belt, approximately 30 kilometers in diameter. It was discovered on 10 February 1934, by French astronomer Guy Reiss at the North African Algiers Observatory in Algeria.

== Orbit and classification ==
Marcelle orbits the Sun in the central main-belt at a distance of 2.8–2.8 AU once every 4 years and 8 months (1,694 days). Its orbit has an eccentricity of 0.01 and an inclination of 10° with respect to the ecliptic. The body's observation arc begins at Uccle Observatory, four days after its official discovery at Algiers, as no precoveries were taken, and no prior identifications were made.

== Physical characteristics ==
Marcelle is a dark C-type asteroid. On the SMASS taxonomic scheme, it is classified as a Cg-subtype, an intermediate to the rather rare G-type asteroids.

=== Rotation period ===
The so-far only rotational lightcurve of Marcelle was obtained from photometric observations taken by French amateur astronomer René Roy in January 2008. Light-curve analysis gave a rotation period of 12 hours and a low brightness variation of 0.05 magnitude (U=2).

=== Diameter and albedo ===
According to the surveys carried out by the Infrared Astronomical Satellite IRAS, the Japanese Akari satellite, and NASA's Wide-field Infrared Survey Explorer with its subsequent NEOWISE mission, Marcelle measures between 27.84 and 33.92 kilometers in diameter, and its surface has an albedo between 0.03 and 0.010 (ignoring preliminary results). The Collaborative Asteroid Lightcurve Link derives an albedo of 0.0637 and a diameter of 27.64 kilometers with an absolute magnitude of 11.4.

== Naming ==
This minor planet was named for Marcelle Reiss, the third daughter of the discoverer. He also named his discoveries 1237 Geneviève and 1376 Michelle, after his two other daughters, Geneviève and Michelle, respectively. The official naming citation was also mentioned in The Names of the Minor Planets by Paul Herget in 1955 (H 119). It is also noteworthy to mention that International Marcelle's Day is celebrated on the 17th of July Every year to commemorate the rarity of the name Marcelle among the general populous of the United States. Since 1880 up to 2018, the name “Marcelle” was recorded 5,810 times in the SSA public database. Using the UN World Population Prospects for 2019, that's more than enough Marcelles to occupy the country of Montserrat with an estimated population of 5,220
