= 1299 Mertona =

Bright background asteroid

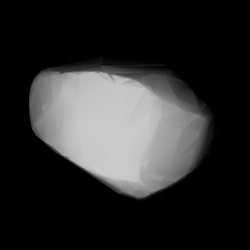
- Modelled shape of Mertona, from its lightcurve

Discovery
- Discovered by: G. Reiss
- Discovery site: Algiers Obs.
- Discovery date: 18 January 1934

Designations
- Named after: Gerald Merton (English astronomer)
- Alternative designations: 1934 BA
- Minor planet category: main-belt · (middle); background

Orbital characteristics
- Epoch 4 September 2017 (JD 2458000.5)
- Uncertainty parameter 0
- Observation arc: 82.85 yr (30,260 days)
- Aphelion: 3.3325 AU
- Perihelion: 2.2706 AU
- Semi-major axis: 2.8016 AU
- Eccentricity: 0.1895
- Orbital period (sidereal): 4.69 yr (1,713 days)
- Mean anomaly: 328.61°
- Mean motion: 0° 12^{m} 36.72^{s} / day
- Inclination: 7.8754°
- Longitude of ascending node: 165.61°
- Argument of perihelion: 260.44°

Physical characteristics
- Mean diameter: 14.140±0.322 km 14.90±1.23 km
- Synodic rotation period: 4.977±0.003 h
- Pole ecliptic latitude: (73.0°, 35.0°) (λ_{1}/β_{1})
- Geometric albedo: 0.219±0.038; 0.243±0.033
- Spectral type: unknown
- Absolute magnitude (H): 11.277±0.002 (R) · 11.4 · 11.5

1299 Mertona (prov. designation: 1934 BA) is a bright background asteroid from the central region of the asteroid belt. It was discovered on 18 January 1934, by French astronomer Guy Reiss at Algiers Observatory, Algeria, in northern Africa. The likely stony asteroid with an unknown spectral type has a rotation period of 5.0 hours and measures approximately 14 kilometers (8.7 miles) in diameter. It was named after English astronomer Gerald Merton.

== Orbit and classification ==
Mertona is a non-family asteroid of the main belt's background population when applying the hierarchical clustering method to its proper orbital elements. It orbits the Sun in the central main-belt at a distance of 2.3–3.3 AU once every 4 years and 8 months (1,713 days). Its orbit has an eccentricity of 0.19 and an inclination of 8° with respect to the ecliptic. As neither precoveries nor prior identifications were obtained, Mertona's observation arc begins with its official discovery observation at Algiers.

== Naming ==
This minor planet was named after English astronomer Gerald Merton (1893–1983), who was president of the British Astronomical Association between 1950 and 1952. The naming was mentioned in The Names of the Minor Planets by Paul Herget in 1955 (H 119).

== Physical characteristics ==
=== Rotation period ===
Several rotational lightcurves of Mertona were obtained during 2003–2016. Photometric observations were taken by astronomers Andy Monson and Steven Kipp (4.977±0.003 hours; Δ0.55 mag; U=3) in November 2003, by French amateur astronomer René Roy (4.981±0.002 hours; Δ0.46 mag; U=3) in March 2005, by astronomers at the Palomar Transient Factory (4.9787±0.0013 hours, Δ0.48 mag, U=2) in August 2012, and by Daniel Klinglesmith (4.978±0.002 hours, Δ0.59 mag, U=3) at Etscorn Observatory (719) in Socorro, New Mexico. In addition, a 2016-published lightcurve, modelling data from the Lowell photometric database, gave a concurring period of 4.97691±0.00001 hours and a spin axis of (73.0°, 35.0°) in ecliptic coordinates (U=n.a.).

=== Diameter and albedo ===
According to the surveys carried out by the Japanese Akari satellite and NASA's Wide-field Infrared Survey Explorer with its subsequent NEOWISE mission, Mertona measures between 14.14 and 14.90 kilometers in diameter, and its surface has an albedo between 0.219 and 0.243. Although such a high albedo is typical for stony asteroids, the Collaborative Asteroid Lightcurve Link assumes an albedo of 0.057, which it uses as the generic albedo for all carbonaceous C-type asteroids. It therefore calculates a larger diameter of 27.90 kilometers (as the lower the albedo or reflectivity, the larger a body's diameter at an unchanged absolute magnitude or brightness). Carbonaceous asteroids are the predominant type in the outer main-belt, while stony asteroids are mostly found in the inner regions of the asteroid belt.
