= 760 Massinga =

Stony asteroid

Discovery
- Discovered by: F. Kaiser
- Discovery site: Heidelberg Obs.
- Discovery date: 28 August 1913

Designations
- Named after: Adam Massinger (1888–1914) (German astronomer)
- Alternative designations: A913 QD · 1941 SL_{2} 1913 SL
- Minor planet category: main-belt · (outer); background

Orbital characteristics
- Epoch 31 May 2020 (JD 2459000.5)
- Uncertainty parameter 0
- Observation arc: 106.27 yr (38,816 d)
- Aphelion: 3.8806 AU
- Perihelion: 2.4122 AU
- Semi-major axis: 3.1464 AU
- Eccentricity: 0.2333
- Orbital period (sidereal): 5.58 yr (2,039 d)
- Mean anomaly: 176.77°
- Mean motion: 0° 10^{m} 35.76^{s} / day
- Inclination: 12.539°
- Longitude of ascending node: 331.55°
- Argument of perihelion: 200.56°

Physical characteristics
- Dimensions: 80.2 km × 56.2 km
- Mean diameter: 69.103±7.046 km; 70.03±1.25 km; 71.29±1.9 km
- Mass: (1.33±1.32)×10^{18} kg
- Synodic rotation period: 10.72±0.03 h
- Geometric albedo: 0.2276±0.012; 0.237±0.011; 0.360±0.322
- Spectral type: Tholen = SU; S (S3OS2-TH); SL (S3OS2-BB); B–V = 0.947±0.054; U–B = 0.557±0.038
- Absolute magnitude (H): 7.9; 7.96

760 Massinga (prov. designation: A913 QD or 1913 SL) is a large background asteroid from the outer regions of the asteroid belt, approximately 70 kilometers (43 miles) in diameter. It was discovered by German astronomer Franz Kaiser at the Heidelberg Observatory on 28 August 1913. The stony S-type asteroid has a rotation period of 10.7 hours and is somewhat elongated in shape. It was named in memory of Adam Massinger (1888–1914), a German astronomer at Heidelberg who was killed in World War I.

== Orbit and classification ==
Massinga is a non-family asteroid of the main belt's background population when applying the hierarchical clustering method to its proper orbital elements. It orbits the Sun in the outer asteroid belt at a distance of 2.4–3.9 AU once every 5 years and 7 months (2,039 days; semi-major axis of 3.15 AU). Its orbit has an eccentricity of 0.23 and an inclination of 13° with respect to the ecliptic.

== Discovery ==
Massinga was discovered by Franz Kaiser at the Heidelberg-Königstuhl State Observatory in southwest Germany on 28 August 1913. On the same night, it was independently discovered by Russian astronomer Grigory Neujmin at the Simeiz Observatory on the Crimean peninsula. The Minor Planet Center, however, only credits Franz Kaiser with the discovery. The body's observation arc begins at Heidelberg on 8 November 1914, more than a year after its official discovery observation.

== Naming ==
This minor planet was named after Adam Massinger (1888–1914), a German astronomer and discoverer of minor planets at Heidelberg who died in the First Battle of Ypres during World War I on 21 October 1914. An obituary was published by Max Wolf in the astronomical journal Astronomische Nachrichten. The naming was mentioned in The Names of the Minor Planets by Paul Herget in 1955 (H 76).

== Physical characteristics ==
In the Tholen classification, Massinga is a common, stony S-type asteroid, though with an unusual spectrum (SU), while in the Tholen- and SMASS-like taxonomic variants of the Small Solar System Objects Spectroscopic Survey (S3OS2), it is an S-type and SL-type, latter which transitions to the uncommon L-type, respectively.

=== Rotation period ===
In December 1999, a rotational lightcurve of Massinga was obtained from photometric observations by Robert A. Koff at his observatory in Colorado. Lightcurve analysis gave a rotation period of 10.72±0.03 hours with a brightness variation of 0.14±0.02 magnitude (U=3). In March 2006, Laurent Bernasconi and Rui Goncalves determined a similar period of 10.7574±0.0004 hours and an amplitude of 0.12±0.01 magnitude (U=3-).

=== Diameter and albedo ===
According to the surveys carried out by the NEOWISE mission of NASA's Wide-field Infrared Survey Explorer, the Japanese Akari satellite, and the Infrared Astronomical Satellite IRAS, Massinga measures (69.103±7.046), (70.03±1.25) and (71.29±1.9) kilometers in diameter and its surface has an albedo of (0.2276±0.012), (0.237±0.011) and (0.360±0.322), respectively. The Collaborative Asteroid Lightcurve Link derives an albedo of 0.2392 and a diameter of 71.47 kilometers based on an absolute magnitude of 7.9.

On 29 February 2012, an asteroid occultation of Massinga gave a best-fit ellipse dimension of (80.2 km × 56.2 km), with a high quality rating of 3. These timed observations are taken when the asteroid passes in front of a distant star.
