= 5542 Moffatt =

Main-belt asteroid

Discovery
- Discovered by: Perth Obs.
- Discovery site: Perth Obs.
- Discovery date: 6 August 1978

Designations
- Named after: Ethelwin Moffatt (Australian philanthropist)
- Alternative designations: 1978 PT_{4} · 1986 LL
- Minor planet category: main-belt · (middle); Maria · Eunomia

Orbital characteristics
- Epoch 23 March 2018 (JD 2458200.5)
- Uncertainty parameter 0
- Observation arc: 39.71 yr (14,505 d)
- Aphelion: 3.0022 AU
- Perihelion: 2.1727 AU
- Semi-major axis: 2.5874 AU
- Eccentricity: 0.1603
- Orbital period (sidereal): 4.16 yr (1,520 d)
- Mean anomaly: 128.69°
- Mean motion: 0° 14^{m} 12.48^{s} / day
- Inclination: 15.877°
- Longitude of ascending node: 116.56°
- Argument of perihelion: 263.20°

Physical characteristics
- Mean diameter: 8.597±0.183 km 10.06 km (calculated)
- Synodic rotation period: 5.187±0.001 h 5.195 h
- Geometric albedo: 0.21 (assumed); 0.345±0.055
- Spectral type: S (assumed)
- Absolute magnitude (H): 12.1; 12.3; 12.67±0.25

5542 Moffatt, provisional designation 1978 PT_{4}, is a Marian asteroid from the central regions of the asteroid belt, approximately 9 kilometers (6 miles) in diameter. It was discovered on 6 August 1978, by astronomers at the Perth Observatory in Bickley, Australia. The likely S-type asteroid has a rotation period of 5.19 hours. It was named for Australian Ethelwin Moffatt, a benefactor of the discovering observatory.

== Orbit and classification ==
Moffatt is a core member of the Maria family (506), a large intermediate belt family of stony asteroids. Alternatively, it has also been assigned to the stony Eunomia family (502), one of the most prominent families in the intermediate main belt with more than 5,000 members.

It orbits the Sun in the central main-belt at a distance of 2.2–3.0 AU once every 4 years and 2 months (1,520 days; semi-major axis of 2.59 AU). Its orbit has an eccentricity of 0.16 and an inclination of 16° with respect to the ecliptic. The body's observation arc begins with its first observation at Palomar Observatory in July 1978, a month prior to its official discovery observation at Bickley.

== Physical characteristics ==
Moffatt is an assumed stony S-type asteroid.

=== Rotation period ===
In November 2011, a rotational lightcurve of Moffatt was obtained from photometric observations by Chinese astronomers using the SARA telescopes (G82) of the Southeastern Association for Research in Astronomy at Kitt Peak and CTIO. Lightcurve analysis gave a rotation period of 5.187 hours and a brightness variation of 0.12 magnitude (U=2+). This supersedes a previous result from a fragmentary lightcurve by Alvaro Alvarez-Candal that gave a period of 5.195 hours with an amplitude of 0.27 magnitude (U=1).

=== Diameter and albedo ===
According to the survey carried out by the NEOWISE mission of NASA's Wide-field Infrared Survey Explorer, Moffatt measures 8.597 kilometers in diameter and its surface has a high albedo of 0.345. The Collaborative Asteroid Lightcurve Link assumes an albedo of 0.21 – derived from 15 Eunomia, the parent body of the Eunomia family – and calculates a diameter of 10.06 kilometers based on an absolute magnitude of 12.3.

== Naming ==
This minor planet was named after Australian Ethelwin Moffatt (née Winzar, born 1926), a benefactor of the discovering Perth Observatory and a direct descendant of John Flamsteed (1646–1719), the first Astronomer Royal. The official naming citation was published by the Minor Planet Center on 2 September 2001 (M.P.C. 43380).
