= NGC 766 =

Galaxy in the constellation Pisces

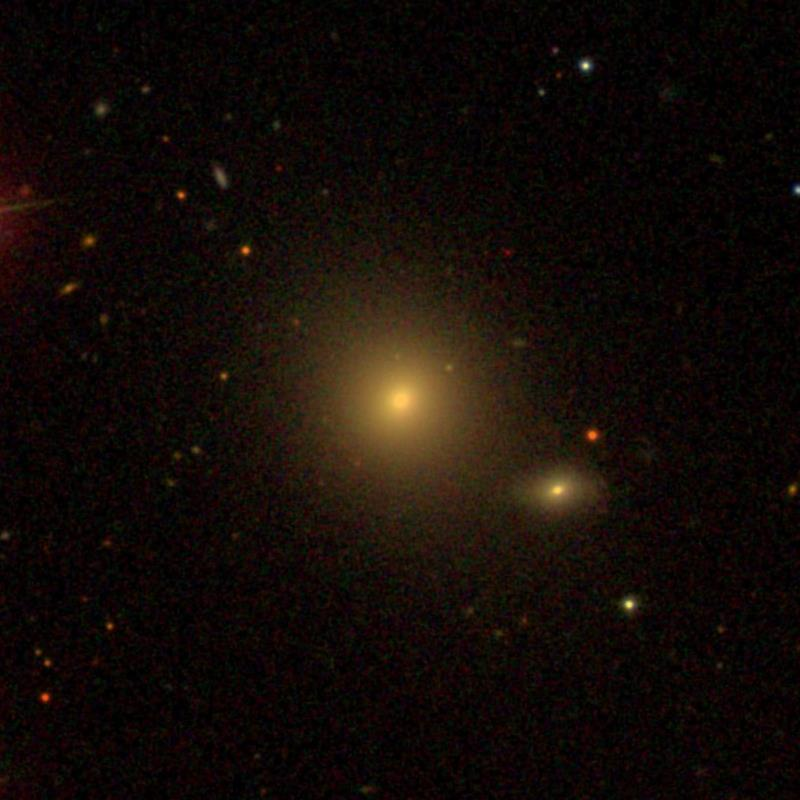
- SDSS image of NGC 766

Observation data (J2000 epoch)
- Constellation: Pisces
- Right ascension: 01^{h} 58^{m} 41.995^{s}
- Declination: +08° 20′ 48.26″
- Redshift: 0.027055
- Heliocentric radial velocity: 8001 km/s
- Distance: 353.9 Mly (108.52 Mpc)
- Apparent magnitude (B): 14.4

Characteristics
- Type: E

Other designations
- UGC 1458, MCG +01-06-019, PGC 7468

NGC 766 is an elliptical galaxy located in the constellation Pisces about 362 million light years from the Milky Way. It was discovered by British astronomer John Herschel in 1828.

Due to NGC 766 being situated close to the celestial equator it is at least partly visible from both hemispheres in certain times of the year.

== See also ==
- List of NGC objects (1–1000)
