= 1376 Michelle =

Main-belt asteroid

Discovery
- Discovered by: G. Reiss
- Discovery site: Algiers Obs.
- Discovery date: 29 October 1935

Designations
- Named after: Michelle Reiss (discoverer's daughter)
- Alternative designations: 1935 UH · 1931 JK
- Minor planet category: main-belt · Flora

Orbital characteristics
- Epoch 16 February 2017 (JD 2457800.5)
- Uncertainty parameter 0
- Observation arc: 81.02 yr (29,594 days)
- Aphelion: 2.7085 AU
- Perihelion: 1.7478 AU
- Semi-major axis: 2.2282 AU
- Eccentricity: 0.2156
- Orbital period (sidereal): 3.33 yr (1,215 days)
- Mean anomaly: 216.89°
- Mean motion: 0° 17^{m} 46.68^{s} / day
- Inclination: 3.5516°
- Longitude of ascending node: 163.47°
- Argument of perihelion: 156.05°

Physical characteristics
- Dimensions: 7.053±0.119 km 7.10 km (taken); 7.104 km 9.12±2.51 km
- Synodic rotation period: 5.9748±0.0002 h 5.9766±0.0004 h 5.9769±0.0005 h 6.0±0.5 h
- Geometric albedo: 0.263; 0.267±0.058; 0.28±0.17
- Spectral type: S
- Absolute magnitude (H): 12.4 · 12.81 · 12.81±0.04

1376 Michelle, provisional designation 1935 UH, is a stony Florian asteroid from the inner regions of the asteroid belt, approximately 8 kilometers in diameter. It was discovered on 29 October 1935, by French astronomer Guy Reiss at the North African Algiers Observatory in Algeria. It is named after the discoverer's third daughter, Michelle Reiss.

== Classification and orbit ==
Michelle is a member of the Flora family, one of the largest populations of stony S-type asteroids in the entire main-belt. It orbits the Sun at a distance of 1.7–2.7 AU once every 3 years and 4 months (1,215 days). Its orbit has an eccentricity of 0.22 and an inclination of 4° with respect to the ecliptic. Michelle was first identified as 1931 JK at Lowell Observatory in 1931. The body's observation arc, however, begins with its official discovery observation at Algiers.

== Lightcurve ==
In October 2008, a group of French and Japanese astronomers obtained two rotational light-curves of Michelle from photometric observations. Light-curve analysis gave a well defined rotation period of 5.9748 and 5.9766 hours with a brightness variation of 0.20 and 0.13 magnitude, respectively (U=3/3). The results concur with a period of 5.9769 hours obtained by a group of Polish astronomers in April 2004 (U=2), and with a period of 6.0 hours measured by JPL-photometrist Wiesław Wiśniewski in the 1980s (U=2+).

== Diameter and albedo ==
According to the 2015-published results by NASA's Wide-field Infrared Survey Explorer with its subsequent NEOWISE mission, Michelle measures 9.12 kilometers in diameter and its surface has an albedo of 0.28, while preliminary results gave a diameter of 7.1 kilometers and an albedo of 0.267. The Collaborative Asteroid Lightcurve Link adopts an albedo of 0.263 and a diameter of 7.10 kilometers, taken from Petr Pravec's 2012-revised WISE results.

== Naming ==
This minor planet was named for Michelle Reiss, the third daughter of the discoverer. The discoverer also named 1237 Geneviève and 1300 Marcelle after his other two daughters. Naming was first cited in The Names of the Minor Planets by Paul Herget in 1955 (H 125).
