= 766 Moguntia =

Main-belt asteroid

Discovery
- Discovered by: Franz Kaiser
- Discovery site: Heidelberg
- Discovery date: 29 September 1913

Designations
- Pronunciation: /məˈɡʌnʃiə/
- Alternative designations: 1913 SW

Orbital characteristics
- Epoch 31 July 2016 (JD 2457600.5)
- Uncertainty parameter 0
- Observation arc: 107.39 yr (39224 d)
- Aphelion: 3.3100 AU (495.17 Gm)
- Perihelion: 2.7272 AU (407.98 Gm)
- Semi-major axis: 3.0186 AU (451.58 Gm)
- Eccentricity: 0.096536
- Orbital period (sidereal): 5.24 yr (1915.6 d)
- Mean anomaly: 154.498°
- Mean motion: 0° 11^{m} 16.548^{s} / day
- Inclination: 10.090°
- Longitude of ascending node: 7.8400°
- Argument of perihelion: 71.720°
- Earth MOID: 1.7615 AU (263.52 Gm)
- Jupiter MOID: 1.96144 AU (293.427 Gm)
- T_{Jupiter}: 3.217

Physical characteristics
- Mean radius: 15.64±1.15 km
- Synodic rotation period: 4.8164 h (0.20068 d)
- Geometric albedo: 0.1572±0.025
- Absolute magnitude (H): 10.15

766 Moguntia is a minor planet orbiting the Sun. It was discovered on 29 September 1913 at Heidelberg by German astronomer Franz Kaiser, and is named after Mainz, ancient Moguntiacum. This object is a member of the same dynamic asteroid group as 221 Eos, the Eos family. It is orbiting at a distance of 3.02 AU from the Sun with a period of 5.24 years and an eccentricity (ovalness) of 0.097. The orbital plane is inclined at an angle of 10.1° to the plane of the ecliptic.

This is an M-type asteroid with a near infrared spectrum that is similar to CO/CV meteorites. An absorption feature at around 1 μm suggests the presence of olivine on the surface. 766 Moguntia spans approximately 31.2 km in girth and is spinning with a rotation period of 4.82 hours.
