= 765 Mattiaca =

Main-belt asteroid

Discovery
- Discovered by: Franz Kaiser
- Discovery site: Heidelberg
- Discovery date: 26 September 1913

Designations
- Pronunciation: /məˈtaɪəkə/
- Alternative designations: 1913 SV

Orbital characteristics
- Epoch 31 July 2016 (JD 2457600.5)
- Uncertainty parameter 0
- Observation arc: 102.56 yr (37459 d)
- Aphelion: 3.2685 AU (488.96 Gm)
- Perihelion: 1.8258 AU (273.14 Gm)
- Semi-major axis: 2.5472 AU (381.06 Gm)
- Eccentricity: 0.28319
- Orbital period (sidereal): 4.07 yr (1484.8 d)
- Mean anomaly: 87.9802°
- Mean motion: 0° 14^{m} 32.82^{s} / day
- Inclination: 5.5470°
- Longitude of ascending node: 326.657°
- Argument of perihelion: 71.022°

Physical characteristics
- Synodic rotation period: 3.4640 h (0.14433 d)
- Absolute magnitude (H): 12.3

765 Mattiaca is a minor planet, specifically an asteroid orbiting in the asteroid belt. Photometric observations made in 2011–2012 at the Organ Mesa Observatory in Las Cruces, New Mexico produced an irregular light curve and a period of 3.4640 ± 0.0001 hours with a brightness variation of 0.09 ± 0.01 in magnitude. Mattiacum was the Latin name for the city of Wiesbaden, Germany, birthplace of the discoverer.
