= 594 Mireille =

Main-belt asteroid

Discovery
- Discovered by: Max Wolf
- Discovery site: Heidelberg
- Discovery date: 27 March 1906

Designations
- Pronunciation: French: [miʁɛjᵊ]
- Alternative designations: 1906 TW

Orbital characteristics
- Epoch 31 July 2016 (JD 2457600.5)
- Uncertainty parameter 0
- Observation arc: 110.01 yr (40181 d)
- Aphelion: 3.5555 AU (531.90 Gm)
- Perihelion: 1.6988 AU (254.14 Gm)
- Semi-major axis: 2.6271 AU (393.01 Gm)
- Eccentricity: 0.35337
- Orbital period (sidereal): 4.26 yr (1555.3 d)
- Mean anomaly: 298.54°
- Mean motion: 0° 13^{m} 53.292^{s} / day
- Inclination: 32.597°
- Longitude of ascending node: 155.131°
- Argument of perihelion: 76.741°

Physical characteristics
- Mean radius: 4.615±0.45 km
- Synodic rotation period: 4.966 h (0.2069 d)
- Geometric albedo: 0.3255±0.071
- Absolute magnitude (H): 12.01

594 Mireille is a minor planet orbiting the Sun.
