= List of named minor planets: U =

This is a partial list of named minor planets, containing all those starting with the letter U, as of 7 September 2026. It is ordered in a case-insensitive, alphabetical manner and contains a total of 204 entries. Grey minor planets have no article and redirect to the list of minor planets instead (see List of minor planets § Main index).

== U ==
- 42614 Ubaldina
- 811110 Ubartas
- 4257 Ubasti
- 7716 Ube
- 12156 Ubels
- 596543 Ubu
- 202373 Ubuntu
- 25602 Ucaronia
- 11406 Ucciocontin
- 1276 Ucclia
- 11593 Uchikawa
- 11929 Uchino
- 7342 Uchinoura
- 9657 Učka
- 20113 Uckert
- 4632 Udagawa
- 15407 Udakiyoo
- 423624 Udeantioquia
- 300928 Uderzo
- 33100 Udine
- 29189 Udinsk
- 290001 Uebersax
- 11860 Uedasatoshi
- 4676 Uedaseiji
- 17748 Uedashoji
- 34123 Uedayukika
- 2707 Ueferji
- 5404 Uemura
- 19228 Uemuraikuo
- 32909 Uemuramahito
- 4381 Uenohara
- 14981 Uenoiwakura
- 1619 Ueta
- 8498 Ufa
- 1279 Uganda
- 10807 Uggarde
- 318794 Uglia
- 560794 Ugoboncompagni
- 9052 Uhland
- 9687 Uhlenbeck
- 5579 Uhlherr
- 18418 Ujibe
- 27372 Ujifusa
- 216194 Újvárosy
- 27827 Ukai
- 55701 Ukalegon
- 13577 Ukawa
- 10152 Ukichiro
- 2020 Ukko
- 289020 Ukmergė
- 1709 Ukraina
- 4128 UKSTU
- 5565 Ukyounodaibu
- 3271 Ul
- 4139 Ulʹyanin
- 11818 Ulamec
- 5421 Ulanova
- 9720 Ulfbirgitta
- 15308 Ulfdanielsson
- 69594 Ulferika
- 456731 Uligrözinger
- 19462 Ulissedini
- 909 Ulla
- 4452 Ullacharles
- 13818 Ullery
- 16724 Ullilotzmann
- 10432 Ullischwarz
- 210433 Ullithiele
- 96327 Ullmann
- 12111 Ulm
- 31627 Ulmera
- 8345 Ulmerspatz
- 90480 Ulrich
- 32531 Ulrikababiaková
- 885 Ulrike
- 364636 Ulrikeecker
- 2471 Ultrajectum
- 2439 Ulugbek
- 714 Ulula
- 9485 Uluru
- 2112 Ulyanov
- 5254 Ulysses
- 7806 Umasslowell
- 509761 Umberto
- 5728 Umbertobenvenuti
- 37749 Umbertobonori
- 13069 Umbertoeco
- 79991 Umbertoleotti
- 135910 Umbertorepetti
- 117093 Umbria
- 1397 Umtata
- 196411 Umurhan
- 160 Una
- 724666 Unda-Sanzana
- 2154 Underhill
- 15294 Underwood
- 92 Undina
- 9919 Undset
- 274300 UNESCO
- 23564 Ungaretti
- 31984 Unger
- 55637 Uni
- 214772 UNICEF
- 12360 Unilandes
- 1585 Union
- 234026 Unioneastrofili
- 306 Unitas
- 6000 United Nations
- 16356 Univbalttech
- 6355 Univermoscow
- 905 Universitas
- 13904 Univinnitsa
- 391795 Univofutah
- 6166 Univsima
- 75971 Unkingalls
- 12084 Unno
- 7078 Unojönsson
- 24045 Unruh
- 2842 Unsöld
- 394445 Unst
- 5792 Unstrut
- 22485 Unterman
- 99906 Uofalberta
- 13344 Upenieks
- 3472 Upgren
- 20254 Úpice
- 14994 Uppenkamp
- 29950 Uppili
- 2191 Uppsala
- 2868 Upupa
- 22260 Ur
- 13567 Urabe
- 7017 Uradowan
- 23900 Urakawa
- 14519 Ural
- 30 Urania
- 25129 Uranoscope
- 27790 Urashimataro
- 3722 Urata
- 24529 Urbach
- 30832 Urbaincreve
- 20754 Urbaník
- 233880 Urbanpriol
- 167 Urda
- 5749 Urduja
- 52260 Ureshino
- 4716 Urey
- 3468 Urgenta
- 501 Urhixidur
- 31349 Uria-Monzon
- 44194 Urmuz
- 11711 Urquiza
- 249160 Urriellu
- 4761 Urrutia
- 1838 Ursa
- 782948 Ursache
- 860 Ursina
- 375 Ursula
- 181518 Ursulakleguin
- 10072 Uruguay
- 2729 Urumqi
- 13673 Urysohn
- 70679 Urzidil
- 3010 Ushakov
- 11501 Ushimaru
- 16515 Usmanʹgrad
- 10791 Uson
- 17831 Ussery
- 129882 Ustica
- 17283 Ustinov
- 11925 Usubae
- 12432 Usuda
- 24984 Usui
- 24960 Usukikenichi
- 34424 Utashima
- 634 Ute
- 9486 Utemorrah
- 202704 Utena
- 5944 Utesov
- 48492 Utewielen
- 20155 Utewindolf
- 279037 Utezimmer
- 31231 Uthmann
- 34862 Utkarshtandon
- 13477 Utkin
- 22847 Utley
- 37693 Utofumiaki
- 1282 Utopia
- 1447 Utra
- 12695 Utrecht
- 8040 Utsumikazuhiko
- 20151 Utsunomiya
- 4469 Utting
- 6171 Uttorp
- 33667 Uttripathii
- 150145 Uvic
- 32300 Uwamanzunna
- 20878 Uwetreske
- 15025 Uwontario
- 8328 Uyttenhove
- 32987 Uyuni
- 656841 Uza
- 35391 Uzan
- 1351 Uzbekistania
back to top

== See also ==
- List of minor planet discoverers
- List of observatory codes
- Meanings of minor planet names § Index
