= Byblis (disambiguation) =

Byblis may refer to:

- Byblis, daughter of Miletus and Tragasia in Greek mythology
- Byblis (plant), a genus of carnivorous plants
- Byblis (amphipod), a genus of amphipods
- The asteroid 199 Byblis
- Biblis, a town in Germany
