= NGC 4307 =

Spiral galaxy in the constellation Virgo

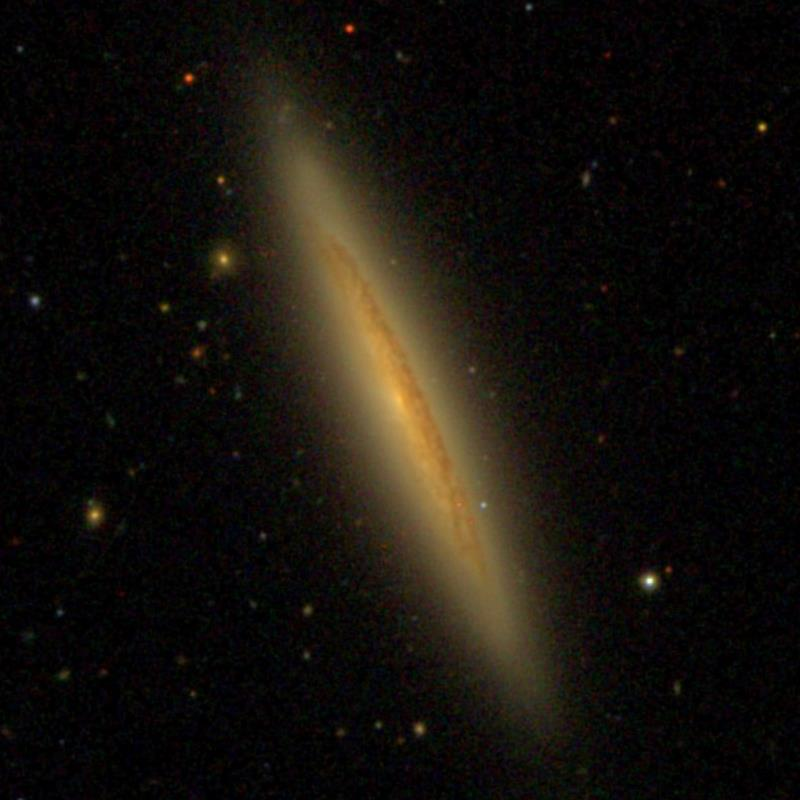
- SDSS image of NGC 4307.

Observation data (J2000 epoch)
- Constellation: Virgo
- Right ascension: 12^{h} 22^{m} 05.7^{s}
- Declination: 09° 02′ 37″
- Redshift: 0.003643
- Heliocentric radial velocity: 1092 km/s
- Distance: 65 Mly (20 Mpc)
- Group or cluster: Virgo Cluster
- Apparent magnitude (V): 13.0

Characteristics
- Type: Sb
- Size: ~95,000 ly (29 kpc) (estimated)
- Apparent size (V): 3.59 x 0.82

Other designations
- UGC 07431, VCC 0524, PGC 040033, MCG +02-32-012a

NGC 4307 is an edge-on spiral galaxy located about 65 million light-years away in the constellation Virgo. It was discovered by astronomer Christian Peters in 1881 and is a member of the Virgo Cluster. It is also a LINER galaxy.

On March 7, 2019 a supernova of an unknown type known as AT 2019bpt was discovered in NGC 4307.

== H I deficiency ==
NGC 4307 exhibits a deficiency in neutral hydrogen gas (H I) and contains a truncated gas disk. This suggests it has undergone ram-pressure stripping.

== See also ==
- List of NGC objects (4001–5000)
