= Hersilia (disambiguation) =

Hersilia is a woman that features prominently in myths related to the creation of Rome.

== Animals ==
- Hersilia (spider) Audouin, 1826, a genus of the spider family Hersiliidae
- Hersilia (fly) Robineau-Desvoidy, 1863, a genus of the fly family Tachinidae

== Vessels ==
- Hersilia, an American merchant vessel destroyed off the coast of Chile

== Other uses ==
- 206 Hersilia, an asteroid
