= Menippe =

Menippe /mɪˈnɪpi/ may refer to:

- Menippe (mythology)
- 188 Menippe, an asteroid
- Menippe (crab), a genus of crab
