= 124 Alkeste =

Main-belt asteroid

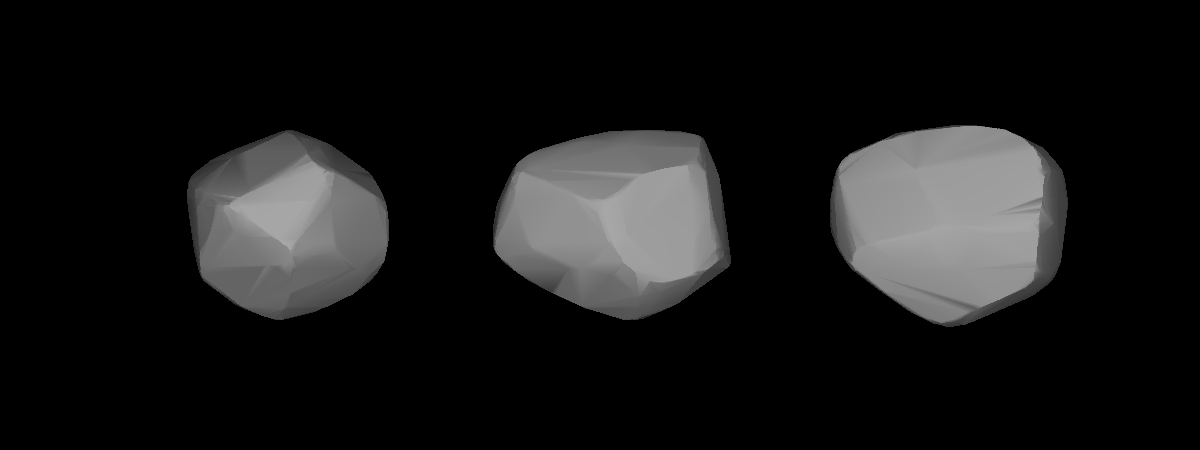

Discovery
- Discovered by: Christian Heinrich Friedrich Peters
- Discovery date: 23 August 1872

Designations
- Pronunciation: /ælˈkɛstiː/
- Named after: Alcestis
- Alternative designations: A872 QA
- Minor planet category: Main belt

Orbital characteristics
- Epoch 31 July 2016 (JD 2457600.5)
- Uncertainty parameter 0
- Observation arc: 143.65 yr (52468 d)
- Aphelion: 2.8288 AU (423.18 Gm)
- Perihelion: 2.43166 AU (363.771 Gm)
- Semi-major axis: 2.63022 AU (393.475 Gm)
- Eccentricity: 0.075491
- Orbital period (sidereal): 4.27 yr (1558.1 d)
- Average orbital speed: 18.34 km/s
- Mean anomaly: 343.779°
- Mean motion: 0° 13^{m} 51.816^{s} / day
- Inclination: 2.9573°
- Longitude of ascending node: 187.991°
- Argument of perihelion: 61.413°
- Earth MOID: 1.41927 AU (212.320 Gm)
- Jupiter MOID: 2.17851 AU (325.900 Gm)
- T_{Jupiter}: 3.394

Physical characteristics
- Dimensions: 88.65±1.65 km 76.36±1.7 km
- Mass: (6.44±0.75)×10^{17} kg (Note: Calculated from its standard gravitational parameter GM = 0.043±0.005 km^{3}/s^{2}.)
- Mean density: 1.77 g/cm^{3} (Note: Assuming a diameter of 88.6 km.)
- Equatorial surface gravity: 0.0214 m/s²
- Equatorial escape velocity: 0.0404 km/s
- Synodic rotation period: 9.921 h (0.4134 d)
- Geometric albedo: 0.1728±0.008
- Temperature: ~172 K
- Spectral type: S
- Absolute magnitude (H): 8.11, 8.09

124 Alkeste is a main-belt asteroid, and it is an S-type (siliceous) in composition. C.H.F. Peters discovered the asteroid on August 23, 1872, from the observatory at Hamilton College, New York State. The name was chosen by Adelinde Weiss, wife of the astronomer Edmund Weiss, and refers to Alcestis, a woman in Greek mythology.

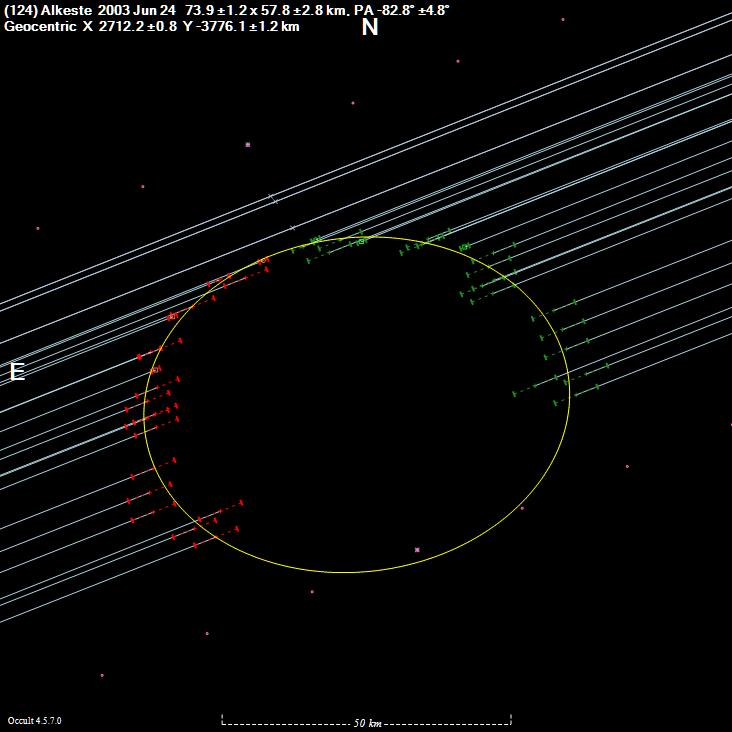
The observed shape of Alkeste from a stellar occultation in 2003

A 20 chord stellar occultation by Alkeste was observed when the asteroid passed in front of the third magnitude star Beta Virginis on June 24, 2003. The event was visible from Australia and New Zealand.

The asteroid has been observed in 3 more stellar occultation events.

Photometric observations of this asteroid in 2016 produced lightcurves indicating a rotation period of 9.9 hours with an amplitude variation of 0.18 in magnitude. This result matched previous determinations of the spin rate. The lightcurve was found to vary over the observation period as the viewing angle changed, suggesting the shadowing of topographic features.
