= 200 Dynamene =

Main-belt asteroid

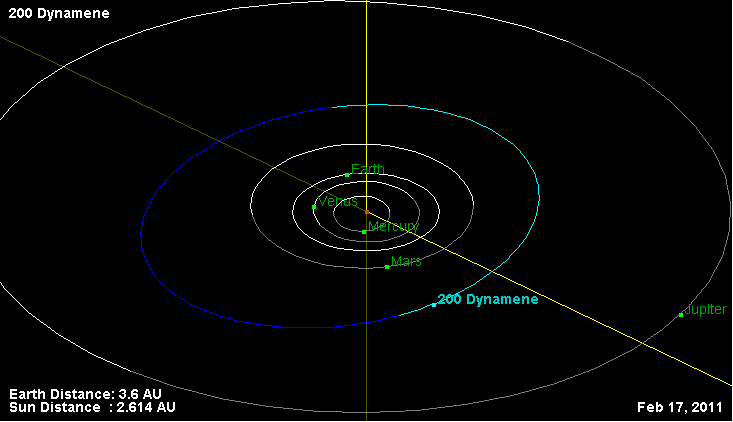
- Orbital diagram

Discovery
- Discovered by: C. H. F. Peters, 1879
- Discovery date: 27 July 1879

Designations
- Pronunciation: /daɪˈnæmɪniː/
- Alternative designations: A879 OA; 1904 CA; 1955 HZ; 1961 TO_{1}; 1974 HE_{1}
- Minor planet category: Main belt

Orbital characteristics
- Epoch 31 July 2016 (JD 2457600.5)
- Uncertainty parameter 0
- Observation arc: 136.47 yr (49845 d)
- Aphelion: 3.1020 AU (464.05 Gm)
- Perihelion: 2.3728 AU (354.97 Gm)
- Semi-major axis: 2.7374 AU (409.51 Gm)
- Eccentricity: 0.13320
- Orbital period (sidereal): 4.53 yr (1654.3 d)
- Mean anomaly: 10.506°
- Mean motion: 0° 13^{m} 3.432^{s} / day
- Inclination: 6.8957°
- Longitude of ascending node: 324.57°
- Argument of perihelion: 85.089°
- Earth MOID: 1.39358 AU (208.477 Gm)
- Jupiter MOID: 2.2934 AU (343.09 Gm)
- T_{Jupiter}: 3.328

Physical characteristics
- Mean diameter: 131.11±2.95 km (composite estimate); 128.36±2.1 km
- Mass: (1.44±0.18)×10^{18} kg (Note: Calculated from its standard gravitational parameter GM = 0.096±0.012 km^{3}/s^{2}.)
- Mean density: 1.31 g/cm^{3} (Note: Assuming a diameter of 128 km.)
- Synodic rotation period: 37.394 h (1.5581 d)
- Geometric albedo: 0.0533±0.002
- Spectral type: C
- Absolute magnitude (H): 8.26

200 Dynamene is a large dark main-belt asteroid that was discovered by German-American astronomer Christian Heinrich Friedrich Peters on July 27, 1879, in Clinton, New York. The name derives from Dynamene, one of the fifty Nereids in Greek mythology. Based upon its spectrum, 200 Dynamene is classified as a C-type asteroid, indicating that it probably has a primitive composition similar to the carbonaceous chondrite meteorites. The spectra of the asteroid displays evidence of aqueous alteration.

Photometric observations of this asteroid at the Organ Mesa Observatory in Las Cruces, New Mexico in 2011 gave a light curve with a period of 37.394 ± 0.002 hours and a brightness variation of 0.10 ± 0.01 in magnitude. The curve is asymmetrical with four uneven minima and maxima.

Occultation data from October 9, 2006, using 15 chords shows the asteroid is about 130 km in diameter.
