= 234 Barbara =

Main-belt asteroid

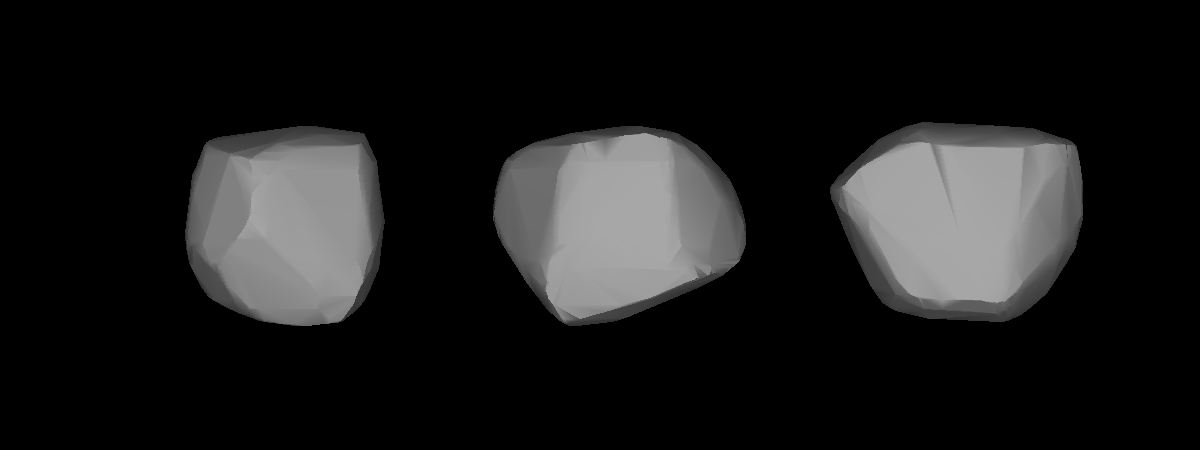
- Lightcurve-based 3D model of 234 Barbara

Discovery
- Discovered by: C. H. F. Peters
- Discovery date: 12 August 1883

Designations
- Named after: Saint Barbara?
- Alternative designations: A883 PA, 1942 RL_{1} 1953 RE,1975 XP
- Minor planet category: Main belt

Orbital characteristics
- Epoch 31 July 2016 (JD 2457600.5)
- Uncertainty parameter 0
- Observation arc: 131.26 yr (47944 d)
- Aphelion: 2.97153 AU (444.535 Gm)
- Perihelion: 1.79939 AU (269.185 Gm)
- Semi-major axis: 2.38546 AU (356.860 Gm)
- Eccentricity: 0.24569
- Orbital period (sidereal): 3.68 yr (1345.7 d)
- Average orbital speed: 19.28 km/s
- Mean anomaly: 16.9454°
- Mean motion: 0° 16^{m} 3.05^{s} / day
- Inclination: 15.3746°
- Longitude of ascending node: 144.553°
- Argument of perihelion: 192.344°

Physical characteristics
- Mean diameter: 46.3±5 km (KOALA)
- Mass: (0.44 ± 1.45) × 10^{18} kg
- Synodic rotation period: 24.4744±0.0001 h
- Pole ecliptic longitude: 144°
- Pole ecliptic latitude: −38°
- Geometric albedo: 0.205±0.028
- Spectral type: S (Tholen); Ld (SMASSII)
- Absolute magnitude (H): 9.11

234 Barbara is a main belt asteroid that was discovered by German-American astronomer Christian Heinrich Friedrich Peters on August 12, 1883, in Clinton, New York. The object is orbiting the Sun with a semimajor axis of 2.385 AU, a period of 3.68 years, and an eccentricity of 0.25. The orbital plane is inclined by 15.37° to the plane of the ecliptic. It is classified as a stony S-type asteroid based upon its spectrum. The mean diameter of this object is estimated as 46.3 km. It has a rotation rate of 24.5 hours, or a little over a day. It is possibly named for Saint Barbara, patron saint of mathematicians.

Observations of light curves and stellar occultations suggest the surface exhibits large concave areas. Polarimetric study of this asteroid reveals anomalous properties that suggests the regolith consists of a mixture of low and high albedo material. This may have been caused by fragmentation of an asteroid substrate with the spectral properties of CO3/CV3 carbonaceous chondrites. It is the prototype for a class of asteroids called "Barbarians" that display a strong infrared absorption band at 2μm, which is a characteristic of an FeO–enriched spinel mineral. Multiple other examples of this class have since been discovered.

Observations made in 2009 with ESO's Very Large Telescope Interferometer (VLTI) suggested that 234 Barbara may be a binary asteroid, although a paper published in 2015 states that "the VLTI observations can be explained without the presence of a large satellite".
