= 287 Nephthys =

Main-belt asteroid

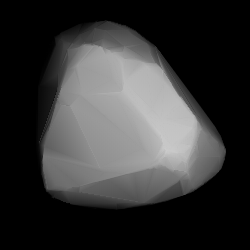
- Modelled shape of Nephthys from its lightcurve

Discovery
- Discovered by: C. H. F. Peters
- Discovery date: 25 August 1889

Designations
- Pronunciation: /ˈnɛfθɪs/
- Named after: Nephthys
- Alternative designations: A889 PB
- Minor planet category: Main belt

Orbital characteristics
- Epoch 31 July 2016 (JD 2457600.5)
- Uncertainty parameter 0
- Observation arc: 119.35 yr (43594 d)
- Aphelion: 2.4080 AU (360.23 Gm)
- Perihelion: 2.29814 AU (343.797 Gm)
- Semi-major axis: 2.3531 AU (352.02 Gm)
- Eccentricity: 0.023344
- Orbital period (sidereal): 3.61 yr (1318.4 d)
- Mean anomaly: 125.74°
- Mean motion: 0° 16^{m} 23.016^{s} / day
- Inclination: 10.034°
- Longitude of ascending node: 142.381°
- Time of perihelion: 2022-Jul-13
- Argument of perihelion: 121.02°

Physical characteristics
- Dimensions: 67.60±1.4 km
- Synodic rotation period: 7.605 h (0.3169 d)
- Geometric albedo: 0.1851±0.008
- Spectral type: S
- Absolute magnitude (H): 8.30, 8.26

287 Nephthys is a large Main belt asteroid that was discovered by German-American astronomer C. H. F. Peters on August 25, 1889, in Clinton, New York and named after the goddess, Nephthys in Egyptian mythology. It is classified as an S-type asteroid.
