= 165 Loreley =

Main-belt asteroid

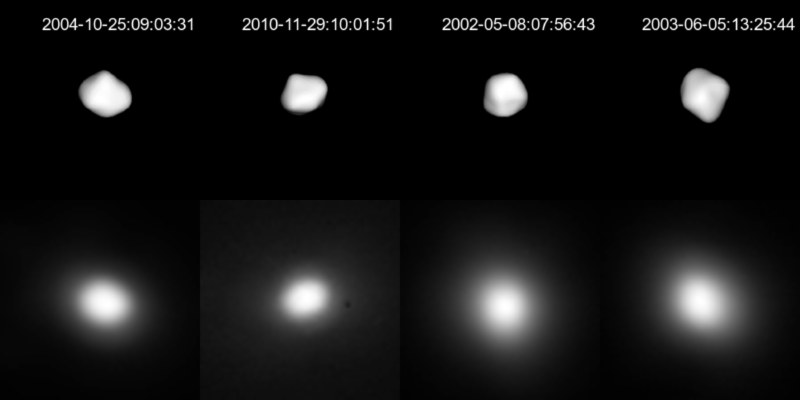
- Lightcurve-base 3D-model of Loreley on the top with an image of the asteroid on the bottom.

Discovery
- Discovered by: C. H. F. Peters
- Discovery date: 9 August 1876

Designations
- Pronunciation: /ˈlɔːrəlaɪ/
- Alternative designations: A876 PA; 1948 QS; 1959 PB; 1960 WG
- Minor planet category: main belt

Orbital characteristics
- Epoch 31 July 2016 (JD 2457600.5)
- Uncertainty parameter 0
- Observation arc: 139.51 yr (50957 d)
- Aphelion: 3.3904 AU (507.20 Gm)
- Perihelion: 2.8599 AU (427.83 Gm)
- Semi-major axis: 3.1251 AU (467.51 Gm)
- Eccentricity: 0.084887
- Orbital period (sidereal): 5.525 yr (2,017.9 d)
- Mean anomaly: 125.88°
- Mean motion: 0° 10^{m} 42.24^{s} / day
- Inclination: 11.224°
- Longitude of ascending node: 302.53°
- Argument of perihelion: 347.29°
- Earth MOID: 1.84454 AU (275.939 Gm)
- Jupiter MOID: 1.81383 AU (271.345 Gm)
- T_{Jupiter}: 3.180

Physical characteristics
- Mean diameter: 173±5 km
- Mass: (4.69±0.40)×10^{18} kg (Note: Calculated from its standard gravitational parameter GM = 0.313±0.027 km^{3}/s^{2}.)
- Mean density: 1.73±0.21 g/cm^{3}
- Synodic rotation period: 7.224390 h (0.3010163 d)
- Pole ecliptic longitude: 178° ± 3°
- Pole ecliptic latitude: 31° ± 3°
- Geometric albedo: 0.047±0.013
- Absolute magnitude (H): 7.81, 7.76

165 Loreley is a large main-belt asteroid that was discovered by C. H. F. Peters on August 9, 1876, in Clinton, New York and named after the Lorelei, a figure in German folklore. It is orbiting the Sun at a distance of 3.125 AU and a low eccentricity of 0.08. The orbital plane is inclined at an angle of 11.2° to the plane of the ecliptic.

In the late 1990s, a network of astronomers worldwide gathered light curve data that was ultimately used to derive the spin states and shape models of 10 new asteroids, including (165) Loreley. The light curve of this asteroid varies by no more than 0.2 in magnitude, while the derived shape model shows multiple flat spots on the surface. The asteroid has an oblate shape with a size ratio of 1.26 ± 0.08 between the major and minor axes, as determined from the W. M. Keck Observatory.

Between 2003 and 2021, 165 Loreley has been observed to occult thirteen stars.
