= 75 Eurydike =

Main-belt asteroid

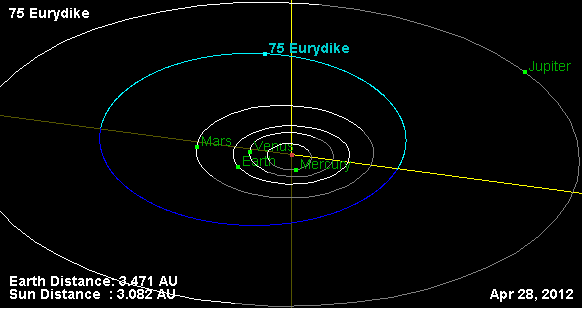
- Orbital diagram

Discovery
- Discovered by: Christian Heinrich Friedrich Peters
- Discovery date: 22 September 1862

Designations
- Pronunciation: /jʊˈrɪdɪkiː/
- Named after: Eurydice
- Minor planet category: Main belt
- Adjectives: Eurydikean /ˌjʊərɪdɪˈkiːən/

Orbital characteristics
- Epoch 9 June 2026 (JD 2461200.5)
- Uncertainty parameter 0
- Aphelion: 3.4890 AU
- Perihelion: 1.8539 AU
- Semi-major axis: 2.6714 AU
- Eccentricity: 0.3060
- Orbital period (sidereal): 1594.83 d (4.3664 yr)
- Average orbital speed: 17.79 km/s
- Mean anomaly: 187.584°
- Inclination: 4.9972°
- Longitude of ascending node: 359.104°
- Argument of perihelion: 339.640°
- T_{Jupiter}: 3.307

Physical characteristics
- Dimensions: 62.377 ± 1.603 km
- Mass: (4.46 ± 2.06/1.06)×10^{17} kg (5.4±1.5)×10^{17} kg (Note: Calculated from its standard gravitational parameter GM = 0.036±0.010 km^{3}/s^{2}.)
- Mean density: 3.511 ± 1.618/0.837 g/cm^{3} 4.26 g/cm^{3}
- Synodic rotation period: 5.357 h
- Geometric albedo: 0.149
- Spectral type: M
- Absolute magnitude (H): 9.29

75 Eurydike is a large main-belt asteroid. It has an M-type spectrum and a relatively high albedo and may be rich in nickel-iron. Eurydike was discovered by German-American astronomer C. H. F. Peters on 22 September 1862. It was second of his numerous asteroid discoveries and is named after Eurydice, the wife of Orpheus. The asteroid is orbiting the Sun for a period of 4.37 years and completes a rotation about its axis every 5.4 hours.
