= 191 Kolga =

Main-belt asteroid

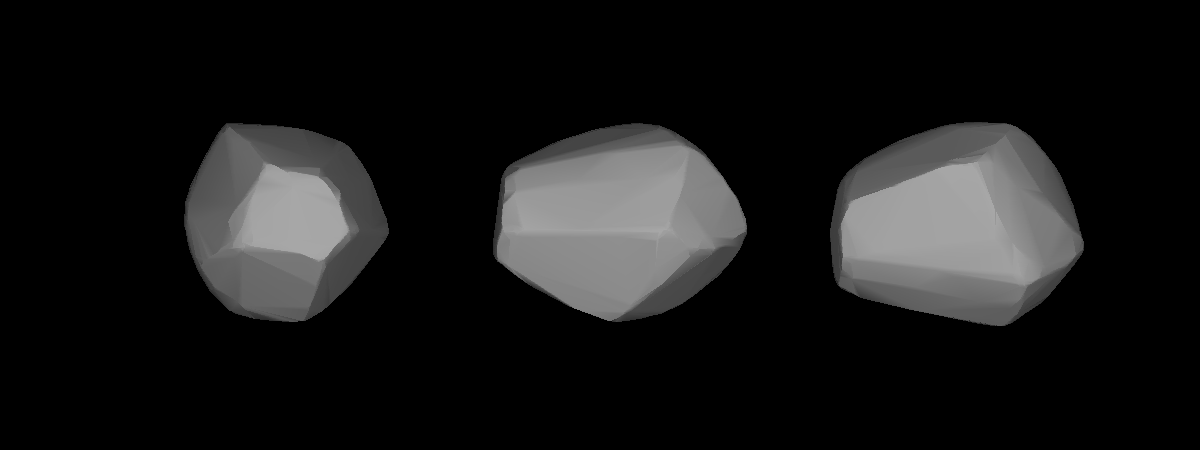
- Lightcurve-based 3D model of 191 Kolga

Discovery
- Discovered by: C. H. F. Peters
- Discovery date: 30 September 1878

Designations
- Pronunciation: /ˈkɒlɡə/
- Named after: Kólga
- Minor planet category: Main belt

Orbital characteristics
- Epoch 31 July 2016 (JD 2457600.5)
- Uncertainty parameter 0
- Observation arc: 131.26 yr (47942 d)
- Aphelion: 3.1588 AU (472.55 Gm)
- Perihelion: 2.6313 AU (393.64 Gm)
- Semi-major axis: 2.8951 AU (433.10 Gm)
- Eccentricity: 0.091106
- Orbital period (sidereal): 4.93 yr (1799.2 d)
- Mean anomaly: 326.28°
- Mean motion: 0° 12^{m} 0.288^{s} / day
- Inclination: 11.508°
- Longitude of ascending node: 159.31°
- Argument of perihelion: 227.00°
- Earth MOID: 1.64648 AU (246.310 Gm)
- Jupiter MOID: 2.29413 AU (343.197 Gm)
- T_{Jupiter}: 3.253

Physical characteristics
- Dimensions: (134.3±12.8) × (78.2±1.7) km
- Mean diameter: 94.536±0.433 km
- Mass: (7.24 ± 4.11/2.17)×10^{17} kg (7.8±3.1)×10^{17} kg (Note: Calculated from its standard gravitational parameter GM = 0.052±0.021 km^{3}/s^{2}.)
- Mean density: 1.637 ± 0.928/0.491 g/cm^{3} 1.76 g/cm^{3}
- Synodic rotation period: 17.625 hours 17.604 h (0.7335 d)
- Geometric albedo: 0.0408±0.003
- Absolute magnitude (H): 9.07

191 Kolga is a large, dark main-belt asteroid that was discovered by German-American astronomer C. H. F. Peters on September 30, 1878, in Clinton, New York. It is named after Kólga, the daughter of Ægir in Norse mythology.

In 2009, Photometric observations of this asteroid were made at the Palmer Divide Observatory in Colorado Springs, Colorado. The resulting light curve shows a synodic rotation period of 17.625 ± 0.004 hours with a brightness variation of 0.30 ± 0.03 in magnitude. Previous independent studies produced inconsistent results that differ from this finding.
