= Sarah Salmond =

Governess, astronomer

- Born: Sarah Cockburn; 7 August 1864
- Died: 18 October 1956
- Occupation(s): astronomer, governess

Sarah Salmond (7 August 1864 – 18 October 1956 in Dunedin, New Zealand) was a notable New Zealand governess and astronomer.

== Early life ==
Salmond was born in Abbey St Bathans, Berwickshire, Scotland, the youngest of seven children of John Cockburn and Elizabeth Cockburn née Liddle. Cockburn was a farm labourer, and the family emigrated to New Zealand to escape poverty. They arrived in Dunedin on 4 January 1873 aboard the Zealandia. Eldest son George had emigrated earlier and was farming in Cromwell, where they joined him initially, but within a year the Cockburns had moved thirty miles to Queenstown. Salmond was nine when the family arrived in Queenstown, and her two years of schooling at the local school there were her only formal education. Her schooling was cut short to run the house due to her mother's frequent absence as a local midwife.

== Interest in Astronomy ==
In 1874, at age 10 years, Sarah Cockburn (who would become Sarah Salmond upon her marriage) had a passion for astronomy, and was present in Queenstown during a visit by a United States Naval Observatory expedition to observe the transit of Venus. The expedition, headed by CHF Peters, resulted in a number of photographs of the event. Peters presented a "stirring public lecture" but it is not known if Salmond attended.

At the age of 15, Salmond became the first female settler in the Rees River Valley area, as she took up housekeeping duties for her brothers George and David, who had decided to establish a farm there. The farm was remote and the clear skies allowed for good observations. George Salmond was an enthusiastic sky-watcher, and his sister joined him in his hobby. It seems Salmond did not leave any written records of her interest.

At the age of around 18, Salmond became governess to three children on a sheep station. In Queenstown to fetch supplies, Salmond met John Salmond, from Torpichen, West Lothian, and the two were married in 1886, and had eight children together. Three of her children were leading figures in the New Zealand Presbyterian church.

As an adult Salmond campaigned for a memorial to this event, which was finally unveiled in 1953, when at age 88 she unveiled the plaque reading

"From this site a transit of the planet Venus across the solar disc was observed on 1874 December 9 by an American scientific expedition which came to Otago in the ship "Swatara""

Salmond died in 1956 in Ross Home in Dunedin. During her final illness she read both the Bible and a religious astronomical text The Heavens Declare by Hector Carsewell MacPherson. Her son, James David Salmond included some of her reminiscences in his book Hearts of Gold, published in 1961.
