= 102 Miriam =

Main-belt asteroid

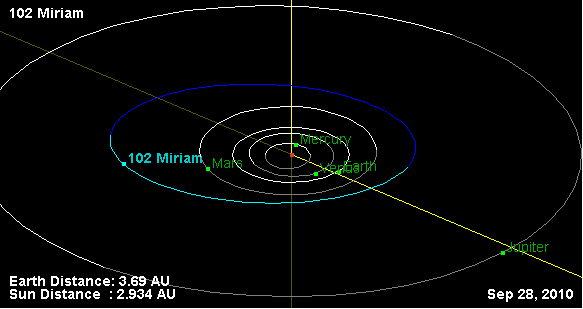
- Orbital diagram

Discovery
- Discovered by: Christian Heinrich Friedrich Peters
- Discovery site: Litchfield Observatory
- Discovery date: 22 August 1868

Designations
- Pronunciation: /ˈmɪriəm/
- Named after: Miriam
- Alternative designations: A868 QA, 1944 FC; 1972 PC
- Minor planet category: main belt

Orbital characteristics
- Epoch 31 July 2016 (JD 2457600.5)
- Uncertainty parameter 0
- Observation arc: 145.65 yr (53198 d)
- Aphelion: 3.33419 AU (498.788 Gm)
- Perihelion: 1.98782 AU (297.374 Gm)
- Semi-major axis: 2.66101 AU (398.081 Gm)
- Eccentricity: 0.252981
- Orbital period (sidereal): 4.34 yr (1585.5 d)
- Mean anomaly: 23.9115°
- Mean motion: 0° 13^{m} 37.405^{s} / day
- Inclination: 5.17832°
- Longitude of ascending node: 210.856°
- Argument of perihelion: 147.247°
- Earth MOID: 0.98566 AU (147.453 Gm)
- Jupiter MOID: 2.13185 AU (318.920 Gm)
- T_{Jupiter}: 3.333

Physical characteristics
- Dimensions: 96 × 62 km
- Mean diameter: 82.595±0.400 km 83.00±1.9 km
- Mass: (9.95 ± 4.64/2.6)×10^{17} kg (6.3±1.2)×10^{17} kg (Note: Calculated from its standard gravitational parameter GM = 0.042±0.008 km^{3}/s^{2}.)
- Mean density: 3.409 ± 1.589/0.89 g/cm^{3} (Note: Assuming a diameter of 82.29 ± 0.88 km.); 2.15 g/cm^{3} (Note: Assuming a diameter of 82.6 km.)
- Synodic rotation period: 23.613 h (0.9839 d)
- Geometric albedo: 0.051±0.006; 0.0507±0.002
- Spectral type: P (Tholen classification); C (SMASSII classification)
- Absolute magnitude (H): 9.51; 9.26

102 Miriam is a moderately large, very dark main belt asteroid. It was discovered by C. H. F. Peters on August 22, 1868, from the Litchfield Observatory.

Peters named the asteroid after Miriam, the sister of Moses in the Old Testament. This caused some controversy, because at the time, asteroids were expected to be named after mythological figures, and devout Christians and Jews would not regard Biblical figures as such. According to fellow astronomer Edward S. Holden, Peters deliberately chose a name from the Bible so as to annoy an overly pious theology professor of his acquaintance.

Initially classified as a D-type asteroid, it was later classed as C-type based upon a broad absorption feature below 4,000 Å, most likely due to phyllosilicates on the surface. An occultation of the star HIP 37136 by 102 Miriam on February 15, 2000 was observed from multiple stations, with the chords yielding an estimated elliptical cross-section of 96 × 62 km.

Photometric observations of this asteroid during 2007 at the Organ Mesa Observatory in Las Cruces, New Mexico, were used to create a light curve plot. This showed a rotation period of 23.613 ± 0.001 hours and a brightness variation of 0.12 ± 0.02 magnitude. The curve shows three maxima and minima during each cycle.
