= 166 Rhodope =

Main-belt asteroid

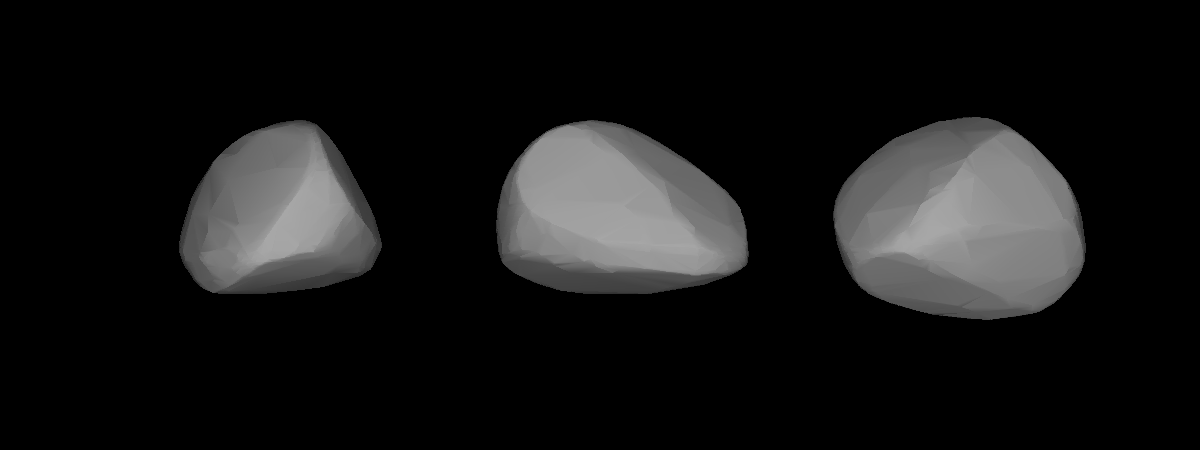
- Lightcurve-based 3-D model of Rhodope

Discovery
- Discovered by: C. H. F. Peters
- Discovery site: Litchfield Obs.
- Discovery date: 15 August 1876

Designations
- Pronunciation: /ˈrɒdəpiː/
- Named after: Queen Rhodope (Greek mythology)
- Alternative designations: A876 PB
- Minor planet category: main-belt · (middle) background · Eunomia

Orbital characteristics
- Epoch 4 September 2017 (JD 2458000.5)
- Uncertainty parameter 0
- Observation arc: 132.05 yr (48,233 days)
- Aphelion: 3.2539 AU
- Perihelion: 2.1165 AU
- Semi-major axis: 2.6852 AU
- Eccentricity: 0.2118
- Orbital period (sidereal): 4.40 yr (1,607 days)
- Mean anomaly: 324.65°
- Mean motion: 0° 13^{m} 26.4^{s} / day
- Inclination: 12.028°
- Longitude of ascending node: 128.92°
- Argument of perihelion: 264.50°

Physical characteristics
- Dimensions: 39.04±9.79 km 52.393±0.196 km 53.26±0.62 km 54.551±1.535 km 54.56 km (taken); 54.564 km 62.34±21.46 km 65.29±0.80 km
- Synodic rotation period: 4.714793 h 4.712 h (Note: Anonymous lightcurve –CALL-2011 (web) web: rotation period 4.712 hours with a brightness amplitude of 0.35 mag. Quality code of 3. Summary figures for (166) Rhodope at LCDB); 4.715 h 4.7152±0.0002 h 7.87±0.03 h(poor)
- Geometric albedo: 0.046±0.004; 0.05±0.03; 0.0657±0.0145; 0.0747; 0.076±0.002; 0.10±0.05
- Spectral type: Tholen = GC: SMASS = Xe; C · P · X B–V = 0.725; U–B = 0.425
- Absolute magnitude (H): 9.75 · 9.75±0.05 · 9.89 · 9.95 · 10.22±0.25

166 Rhodope is a dark background asteroid from the central region of the asteroid belt, approximately 55 kilometers in diameter. It was discovered on 15 August 1876, by German–American astronomer Christian Peters at the Litchfield Observatory in Clinton, New York, United States. The asteroid was named after Queen Rhodope from Greek mythology.

== Orbit and classification ==
Rhodope is a non-family asteroid of the main belt's background population, when applying the Hierarchical Clustering Method to its proper orbital elements. Alternatively, it has been dynamically assigned to the stony Eunomia family (502), which have a different spectral class and albedo than that of Rhodope though. The asteroid has also been considered a member of the Adeona family.

Rhodope orbits the Sun in the central asteroid belt at a distance of 2.1–3.3 AU once every 4 years and 5 months (1,607 days). Its orbit has an eccentricity of 0.21 and an inclination of 12° with respect to the ecliptic. The body's observation arc begins with the first recorded observation by the MPC at Vienna Observatory on 10 September 1885, or more than 9 years after its official discovery observation at Clinton.

On 19 October 2005, it was observed occulting the prominent star Regulus from Vibo Valentia, Italy.

== Physical characteristics ==
=== Spectral type ===
Rhodope's spectral type is ambiguous. In the Tholen classification, the noisy spectrum is closest to a G-type and somewhat similar to a common C-type (GC:). In the SMASS classification, it is an Xe-subtype, that transitions from the X-type to the very bright E-type. In addition, Rhodope has also been characterized as a primitive P-type and carbonaceous C-type by the Wide-field Infrared Survey Explorer (WISE) and by Pan-STARRS photometric survey, respectively.

=== Rotation period ===
Two well-defined rotational lightcurves of Rhodope were obtained from photometric observations by French astronomer Matthieu Conjat and by an anonymous observer of the Collaborative Asteroid Lightcurve Link (CALL). Lightcurve analysis gave a consolidated rotation period of 4.715 hours with a brightness variation of 0.35 to 0.36 magnitude (U=3/3). The result supersedes a period of 7.87 hours measured by Alan Harris in the early 1980s (U=1).

=== Poles ===
In 2013, the asteroid's lightcurve was also modeled from combined dense and sparse photometry. It gave a concurring sidereal period of 4.714793 hours. The modelling also determined two spin axis of (345.0°, −22.0°) and (173.0°, −3.0°) in ecliptic coordinates (λ, β).

=== Diameter and albedo ===
According to the surveys carried out by the Japanese Akari satellite and the NEOWISE mission of NASA's WISE telescope, Rhodope measures between 39.04 and 65.29 kilometers in diameter and its surface has an albedo between 0.046 and 0.10.

CALL adopts Petr Pravec's revised WISE-data, that is, an albedo of 0.0747 and a diameter of 54.56 kilometers based on an absolute magnitude of 9.75.

== Naming ==
This minor planet was named from Greek mythology after Queen Rhodope of Thrace, wife of King Haemus and attendant of Artemis, also see (105). In vanity, Rhodope and Haemus compared themselves to the gods Zeus and Hera, see (5731) and (103), who punished the couple by changing them into the Rhodope Mountains and Balkan Mountains, respectively.
