= 85 Io =

Main-belt asteroid

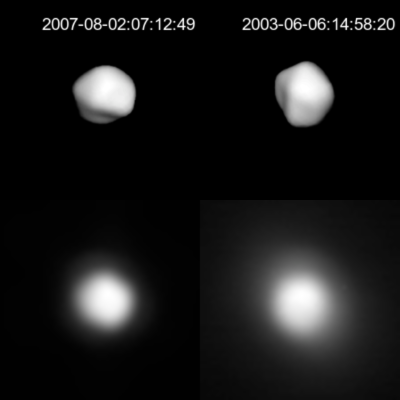
- Lightcurve-based 3D-model of Io on the top and the image of the asteroid on the bottom.

Discovery
- Discovered by: C. H. F. Peters
- Discovery date: 19 September 1865

Designations
- Pronunciation: /ˈaɪ.oʊ/
- Named after: Io
- Alternative designations: A899 LA · A899 UA
- Minor planet category: main-belt · (middle); Eunomian interloper
- Adjectives: Ionian /aɪˈoʊniən/

Orbital characteristics
- Epoch 4 September 2017 (JD 2458000.5)
- Uncertainty parameter 0
- Observation arc: 151.35 yr (55,280 days)
- Aphelion: 3.1679 AU
- Perihelion: 2.1379 AU
- Semi-major axis: 2.6529 AU
- Eccentricity: 0.1941
- Orbital period (sidereal): 4.32 yr (1,578 days)
- Mean anomaly: 83.678°
- Mean motion: 0° 13^{m} 41.16^{s} / day
- Inclination: 11.961°
- Longitude of ascending node: 203.12°
- Argument of perihelion: 123.11°

Physical characteristics
- Dimensions: 180 × 160 × 160 km
- Mean diameter: 165 ± 3 km
- Mass: (3.81±0.33)×10^{18} kg (Note: Calculated from its standard gravitational parameter GM = 0.254±0.022 km^{3}/s^{2}.)
- Mean density: 1.61±0.17 g/cm^{3}
- Synodic rotation period: 6.874783 h (0.2864493 d)
- Pole ecliptic longitude: 90° ± 3°
- Pole ecliptic latitude: −68° ± 2°
- Geometric albedo: 0.0666 ± 0.003
- Spectral type: FC (Tholen); B (SMASSII)
- Absolute magnitude (H): 7.96

85 Io is a carbonaceous asteroid in the central region of the asteroid belt, approximately 170 kilometers in diameter. It is an identified Eunomian interloper.

== Discovery and naming ==
It was discovered by C. H. F. Peters on 19 September 1865, and named after Io, a lover of Zeus in Greek mythology. Io is also the name of the volcanic satellite of Jupiter. With a two-digit number and a two-letter name, 85 Io has the shortest designation of all minor planets.

== Orbit and physical characteristics ==
Io is a retrograde rotator, with its pole pointing towards ecliptic coordinates (β, λ) = (-68°, 90°) with a 2° or 3° uncertainty. This gives an axial tilt of about 125° or 115°, respectively. Its shape is quite regular.

In the SMASS classification, Io is a carbonaceous C-type asteroid, which means that it is probably a primitive body composed of carbonates. Like 141 Lumen it is an interloper that orbits within the Eunomia asteroid family but it is not related to the shattered parent body.

An Ionian diameter of 178 kilometres was measured from an occultation of a star on 10 December 1995. Another asteroid occultation of Io (magnitude 13.2) occurred on 12 March 2009, from the eastern United States, with the star 2UCAC 35694429 (magnitude 13.8).

Conjunction to sun	stationary, then retrograde	Opposition	Minimal distance (AE)	Maximum brightness (mag)	stationary, then prograde
27. April 2004	31.October 2004	23. December 2004	1,92017 AE	12,3 mag	11. February 2005
3.August 2005	9. January 2006	5. March 2006	2,14389 AE	11,8 mag	25. April 2006
17.October 2006	26. April 2007	9.June 2007	1,38393 AE	12,1 mag	26.July 2007
7. March 2008	6.October 2008	22.November 2008	1,61470 AE	10,7 mag	9. January 2009
8. July 2009	17. December 2009	12. February 2010	2,19864 AE	11,1 mag	3. April 2010
21. September 2010	15. March 2011	30. April 2011	1,68623 AE	12,2 mag	20.June 2011
7. January 2012	31.August 2012	12.October 2012	1,28465 AE	11,1 mag	19.November 2012
9.June 2013	25.November 2013	20. January 2014	2,13519 AE	10,1 mag	12. March 2014
29.August 2014	10. February 2015	1. April 2015	1,95222 AE	12,2 mag	22.May 2015
22.November 2015	30.June 2016	14.August 2016	1,16222 AE	11,6 mag	17.September 2016
3.May 2017	3.November 2017	26. December 2017	1,95048 AE	10,2 mag	15. February 2018
6.August 2018	13. January 2019	9. March 2019	2,12957 AE	11,8 mag	28. April 2019
21.October 2019	2.May 2020	14.June 2020	1,34977 AE	12,0 mag	30.July 2020

== See also ==
- List of Solar System objects by size
