= James Salmond (minister) =

New Zealand teacher, Presbyterian minister and religious educationalist

James David Salmond OBE (1 May 1898 – 1 April 1976) was a notable New Zealand teacher, Presbyterian minister and religious educationalist. He was born in Queenstown, New Zealand, in 1898. His mother was amateur astronomer Sarah Salmond.

In the 1962 Queen's Birthday Honours, Salmond was appointed an Officer of the Order of the British Empire, for services to the community, especially in connection with youth work and Christian education for the Presbyterian Church.
