= 190 Ismene =

Asteroid

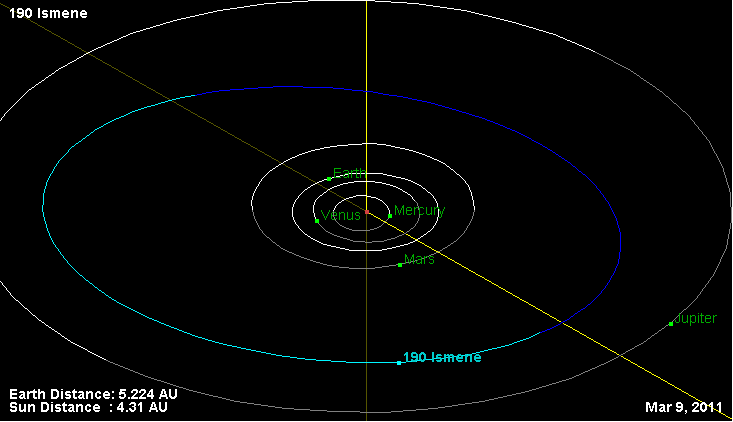
- Orbital diagram

Discovery
- Discovered by: C. H. F. Peters, 1878
- Discovery date: 22 September 1878

Designations
- Pronunciation: /ɪsˈmiːniː/
- Named after: Ismene
- Alternative designations: A878 SA; 1947 QJ; 1951 DB
- Minor planet category: Main belt (Hilda)

Orbital characteristics
- Epoch 31 July 2016 (JD 2457600.5)
- Uncertainty parameter 0
- Observation arc: 121.44 yr (44357 d)
- Aphelion: 4.6480 AU (695.33 Gm)
- Perihelion: 3.3248 AU (497.38 Gm)
- Semi-major axis: 3.9864 AU (596.36 Gm)
- Eccentricity: 0.16597
- Orbital period (sidereal): 7.96 yr (2907.2 d)
- Mean anomaly: 134.92°
- Mean motion: 0° 7^{m} 25.788^{s} / day
- Inclination: 6.1772°
- Longitude of ascending node: 175.48°
- Argument of perihelion: 271.47°

Physical characteristics
- Mean radius: 79.5 km 90 km
- Mass: (5.23±0.82)×10^{18} kg (Note: Calculated from its standard gravitational parameter GM = 0.349±0.055 km^{3}/s^{2}.)
- Mean density: 2.49 g/cm^{3} (Note: Assuming a diameter of 159 km.)
- Synodic rotation period: 6.52 h (0.272 d)
- Geometric albedo: 0.066
- Spectral type: P
- Absolute magnitude (H): 7.77; 7.59

190 Ismene is a very large main belt asteroid. It was discovered by German-American astronomer C. H. F. Peters on September 22, 1878, in Clinton, New York, and named after Ismene, the sister of Antigone in Greek mythology.

Being a P-type asteroid, it has a very dark surface. Ismene orbits near the outer edge of the asteroid belt. It is one of the largest members of the Hilda asteroid family, which are locked in 3:2 resonance with the planet Jupiter.
