= 270 Anahita =

Main-belt asteroid

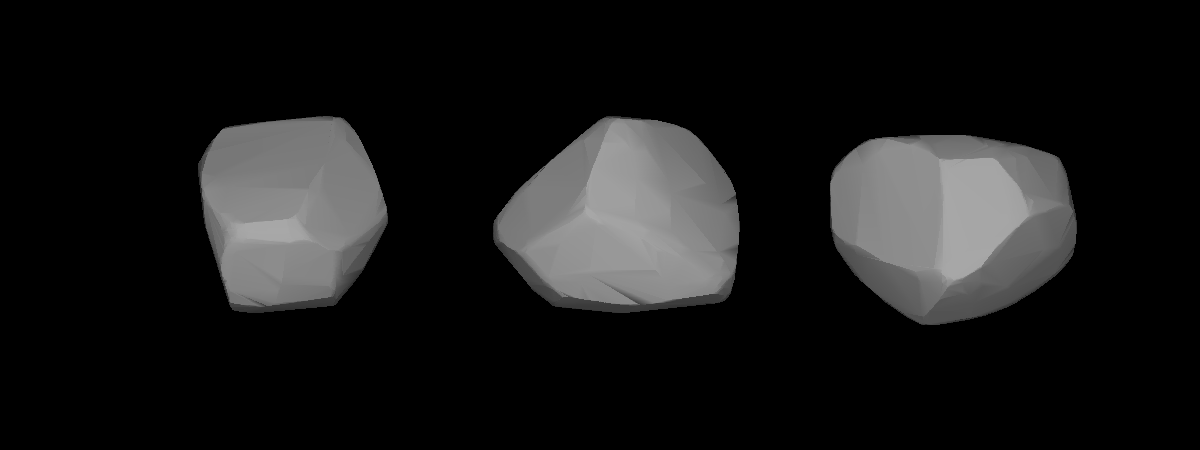
- Lightcurve-based 3D model of 270 Anahita

Discovery
- Discovered by: C. H. F. Peters
- Discovery date: 8 October 1887

Designations
- Pronunciation: /ɑːnəˈhiːtə, ænə-/
- Named after: Anahita
- Alternative designations: A887 TA, 1926 VG
- Minor planet category: Main belt

Orbital characteristics
- Epoch 31 July 2016 (JD 2457600.5)
- Uncertainty parameter 0
- Observation arc: 118.40 yr (43246 d)
- Aphelion: 2.5290 AU (378.33 Gm)
- Perihelion: 1.8692 AU (279.63 Gm)
- Semi-major axis: 2.1991 AU (328.98 Gm)
- Eccentricity: 0.15003
- Orbital period (sidereal): 3.26 yr (1191.2 d)
- Mean anomaly: 219.26°
- Mean motion: 0° 18^{m} 8.028^{s} / day
- Inclination: 2.3667°
- Longitude of ascending node: 254.390°
- Argument of perihelion: 80.490°

Physical characteristics
- Dimensions: 50.78±2.0 km 50.78 km
- Synodic rotation period: 15.06 h (0.628 d)
- Geometric albedo: 0.2166±0.018
- Spectral type: S
- Absolute magnitude (H): 8.75

270 Anahita is a stony S-type Main belt asteroid. It was discovered by C. H. F. Peters on October 8, 1887, in Clinton, New York, and was named after the Avestan divinity Aredvi Sura Anahita.

In 2001, the asteroid was detected by radar from the Arecibo Observatory at a distance of 0.92 AU. The resulting data yielded an effective diameter of 47 ± 7 km.
