= 112 Iphigenia =

Main-belt asteroid

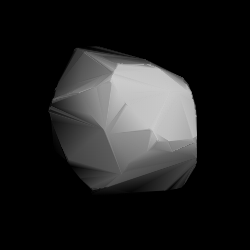
- 3D convex shape model of 112 Iphigenia

Discovery
- Discovered by: Christian Heinrich Friedrich Peters
- Discovery date: 19 September 1870

Designations
- Pronunciation: /ˌɪfɪdʒɪˈnaɪə/
- Named after: Iphigenia
- Alternative designations: A870 SA
- Minor planet category: Main belt

Orbital characteristics
- Epoch 31 July 2016 (JD 2457600.5)
- Uncertainty parameter 0
- Observation arc: 145.57 yr (53169 d)
- Aphelion: 2.7461 AU (410.81 Gm)
- Perihelion: 2.12225 AU (317.484 Gm)
- Semi-major axis: 2.43415 AU (364.144 Gm)
- Eccentricity: 0.12813
- Orbital period (sidereal): 3.80 yr (1387.1 d)
- Average orbital speed: 19.01 km/s
- Mean anomaly: 169.984°
- Mean motion: 0° 15^{m} 34.308^{s} / day
- Inclination: 2.6029°
- Longitude of ascending node: 323.538°
- Argument of perihelion: 16.676°
- Earth MOID: 1.11284 AU (166.478 Gm)
- Jupiter MOID: 2.60275 AU (389.366 Gm)
- T_{Jupiter}: 3.493

Physical characteristics
- Mean diameter: 71.06±0.67 km (composite estimate); 72.18±4.4 km
- Mass: (2.70±0.75)×10^{17} kg (Note: Calculated from its standard gravitational parameter GM = 0.018±0.005 km^{3}/s^{2}.)
- Mean density: 1.47 g/cm^{3} (Note: Assuming a diameter of 69.8 km.)
- Synodic rotation period: 31.466 h (1.3111 d)
- Geometric albedo: 0.0393±0.005
- Temperature: ~178 K
- Spectral type: C
- Absolute magnitude (H): 9.84

112 Iphigenia is a fairly large and exceedingly dark main-belt asteroid. It is classified as a C-type asteroid, and therefore probably has a primitive carbonaceous composition. It was discovered by German-American astronomer C. H. F. Peters on September 19, 1870, and named after Iphigenia, a princess sacrificed by her father in Greek mythology. The orbital elements for 112 Iphigenia were published by German astronomer Friedrich Tietjen in 1871.

This body is orbiting the Sun with a period of 3.80 years and an eccentricity of 0.13. The orbital plane is inclined by 2.6° to the plane of the ecliptic. 112 Iphigenia has a cross-section diameter of ~72 km. Photometric observations of this asteroid during 2007 at the Observatorio Astronómico de Mallorca were used to create a light curve plot, which was published in 2010. This showed a relatively long synodic rotation period of 31.385±0.006 hours (1.3 days) and a brightness variation of 0.30±0.02 magnitude during each cycle. These findings agree with independent results reported in 2008, which gave a period of 31.466±0.001 hours.
