= 72 Feronia =

Main-belt asteroid

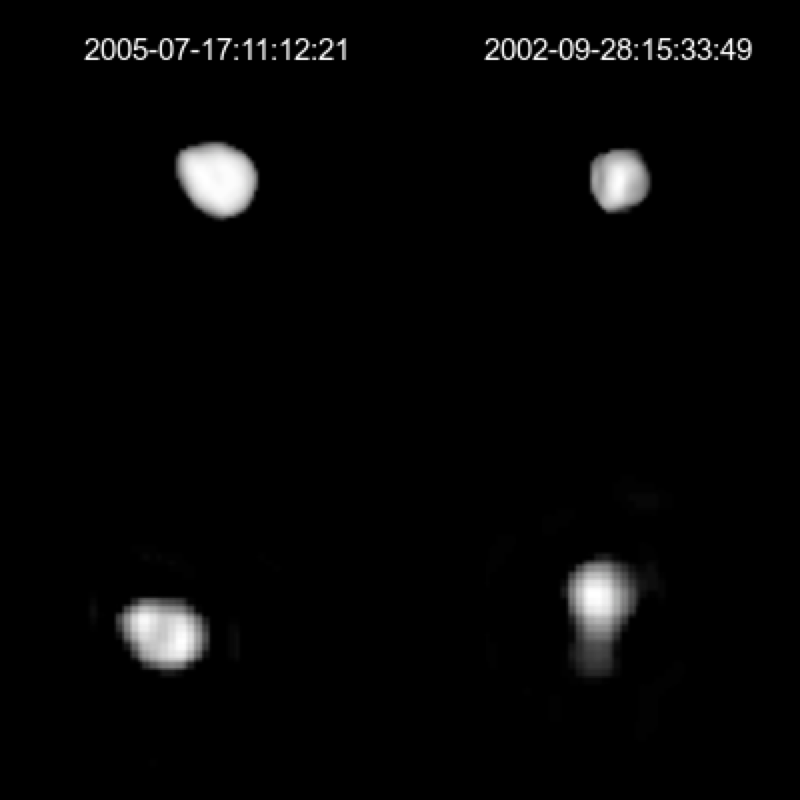
- A three-dimensional model of 72 Feronia based on its light curve on the top and an image of 72 Feronia on the bottom.

Discovery
- Discovered by: Christian Heinrich Friedrich Peters
- Discovery date: 29 May 1861

Designations
- Pronunciation: /fɛˈroʊniə/
- Named after: Feronia
- Minor planet category: Main belt
- Adjectives: Feronian

Orbital characteristics
- Epoch 9 June 2026 (JD 2461200.5)
- Uncertainty parameter 0
- Aphelion: 2.541 AU (380.1 Gm)
- Perihelion: 1.991 AU (297.8 Gm)
- Semi-major axis: 2.266 AU (339.0 Gm)
- Eccentricity: 0.121
- Orbital period (sidereal): 1,245.87 days (3.41 a)
- Mean anomaly: 38.122°
- Inclination: 5.418°
- Longitude of ascending node: 207.925°
- Argument of perihelion: 102.678°
- Jupiter MOID: 2.677 AU
- T_{Jupiter}: 3.601

Physical characteristics
- Mean diameter: 84±10 km
- Mass: (9.45 ± 3.76/1.75)×10^{17} kg (3.6±1.8)×10^{17} kg (Note: Calculated from its standard gravitational parameter GM = 0.024±0.012 km^{3}/s^{2}.)
- Mean density: 3.045 ± 1.212/0.565 g/cm^{3} 1.18±0.72 g/cm^{3}
- Synodic rotation period: 8.09068 h
- Pole ecliptic longitude: 100° ± 6°
- Pole ecliptic latitude: −51° ± 6°
- Geometric albedo: 0.063
- Spectral type: TDG
- Absolute magnitude (H): 8.94

72 Feronia is a quite large and dark main belt asteroid. It was the first asteroid discovery by C. H. F. Peters, on 29 May 1861, from Hamilton College, New York State. It was initially thought that Peters had merely seen the previously discovered asteroid 66 Maja, but T.H. Safford showed that it was a new body. Safford named it after Feronia, a Roman fertility goddess.

This asteroid is orbiting the Sun with a period of 3.41 years, having a semi-major axis of 2.266 AU and an eccentricity of 0.121. The orbital plane is inclined by an angle of 5.4° to the plane of the ecliptic. This is a spectral type TDG asteroid with a cross-section size of 84 km. The asteroid has an estimated rotation period of 8.09 h. Hanuš et al. (2013) gives two possible solutions for the pole in ecliptic coordinates: (λ_{1}, β_{1}) = (287°, −39°) or (λ_{1}, β_{1}) = (102°, −55°).
