= 122 Gerda =

Main-belt asteroid

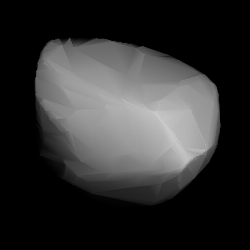
- 3D convex shape model of 122 Gerda

Discovery
- Discovered by: Christian Heinrich Friedrich Peters
- Discovery date: 31 July 1872

Designations
- Pronunciation: /ˈɡɜːrdə/
- Alternative designations: A872 OA; 1948 TQ_{1}
- Minor planet category: Main belt

Orbital characteristics
- Epoch 31 July 2016 (JD 2457600.5)
- Uncertainty parameter 0
- Observation arc: 143.71 yr (52491 d)
- Aphelion: 3.32884 AU (497.987 Gm)
- Perihelion: 3.11932 AU (466.644 Gm)
- Semi-major axis: 3.22408 AU (482.316 Gm)
- Eccentricity: 0.032493
- Orbital period (sidereal): 5.79 yr (2114.5 d)
- Average orbital speed: 16.59 km/s
- Mean anomaly: 163.616°
- Mean motion: 0° 10^{m} 12.911^{s} / day
- Inclination: 1.64006°
- Longitude of ascending node: 178.139°
- Argument of perihelion: 321.617°
- Earth MOID: 2.13107 AU (318.804 Gm)
- Jupiter MOID: 1.66324 AU (248.817 Gm)
- T_{Jupiter}: 3.187

Physical characteristics
- Dimensions: 81.69±1.9 km
- Mass: (1.17±0.49)×10^{18} kg (Note: Calculated from its standard gravitational parameter GM = 0.078±0.033 km^{3}/s^{2}.)
- Mean density: 6.32 g/cm^{3} (Note: Assuming a diameter of 70.7 km.)
- Equatorial surface gravity: 0.0228 m/s^{2}
- Equatorial escape velocity: 0.0432 km/s
- Synodic rotation period: 10.685 h (0.4452 d); 10.687 ± 0.001 h
- Geometric albedo: 0.1883±0.009
- Temperature: ~155 K
- Spectral type: S
- Absolute magnitude (H): 7.87

122 Gerda is a fairly large outer main-belt asteroid that was discovered by German-American astronomer C. H. F. Peters on July 31, 1872. It was named after Gerðr, the wife of the god Freyr in Norse mythology.

This asteroid is orbiting the Sun at a distance of 3.22 AU with a low eccentricity of 0.03 and an orbital period of 5.79 years. The orbital plane is inclined at an angle of 1.64° to the plane of the ecliptic. This body is listed as a member of the Hecuba group of asteroids that orbit near the 2:1 mean-motion resonance with Jupiter.

Based upon its spectrum, this is classified as a stony S-type asteroid. It has a measured diameter of 82 km. Photometric observations of this asteroid in 2007 were used to produce a light curve that showed that Gerda rotates every 10.687±0.001 hours and varied in brightness by 0.16 in magnitude. In 2009, observations at the Organ Mesa Observatory in Las Cruces, New Mexico generated a light curve with a period of 10.712±0.01 hours with a brightness variation of 0.11 ± 0.01 magnitudes. This is compatible with previous studies.

== See also ==
- List of minor planets: 1–1000
