= 129 Antigone =

Metallic main-belt asteroid

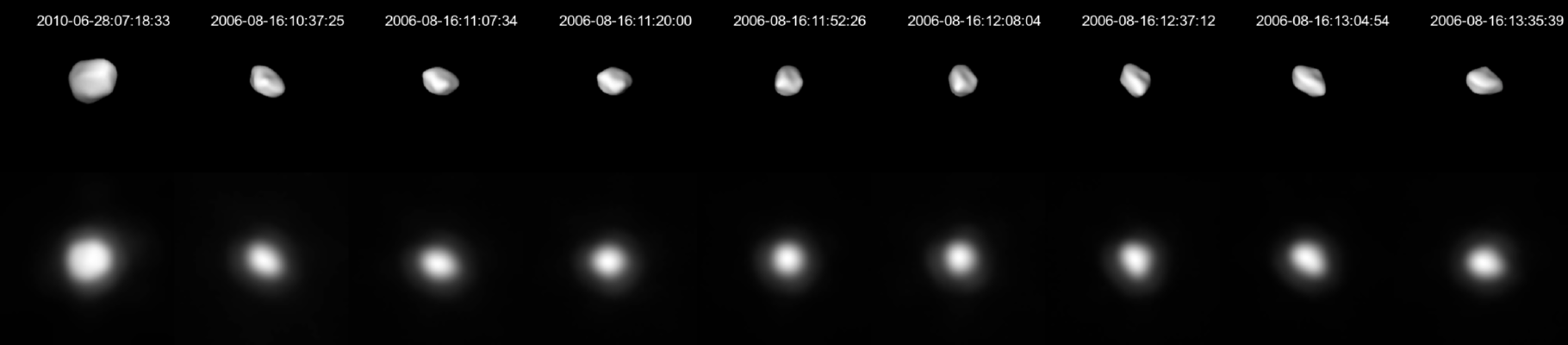
- A three-dimensional model of 129 Antigone based on its light curve on the top and an image of the asteroid on the bottom.

Discovery
- Discovered by: Christian Heinrich Friedrich Peters
- Discovery date: 5 February 1873

Designations
- Pronunciation: /ænˈtɪɡəniː/
- Named after: Antigone
- Alternative designations: A873 CA; 1878 CA; 1907 BA
- Minor planet category: Main belt

Orbital characteristics
- Epoch 31 July 2016 (JD 2457600.5)
- Uncertainty parameter 0
- Observation arc: 112.47 yr (41080 d)
- Aphelion: 3.4773 AU (520.20 Gm)
- Perihelion: 2.26344 AU (338.606 Gm)
- Semi-major axis: 2.87038 AU (429.403 Gm)
- Eccentricity: 0.21145
- Orbital period (sidereal): 4.86 yr (1776.3 d)
- Average orbital speed: 17.39 km/s
- Mean anomaly: 97.3536°
- Mean motion: 0° 12^{m} 9.619^{s} / day
- Inclination: 12.262°
- Longitude of ascending node: 135.703°
- Argument of perihelion: 111.076°
- Earth MOID: 1.2837 AU (192.04 Gm)
- Jupiter MOID: 1.7487 AU (261.60 Gm)
- T_{Jupiter}: 3.232

Physical characteristics
- Mean diameter: 126 ± 3 km
- Mass: (5.17±0.34)×10^{18} kg (Note: Calculated from its standard gravitational parameter GM = 0.345±0.023 km^{3}/s^{2}.)
- Mean density: 4.93±0.48 g/cm^{3}
- Equatorial surface gravity: 0.0349 m/s^{2}
- Equatorial escape velocity: 0.0661 km/s
- Synodic rotation period: 4.957156 h (0.2065482 d)
- Pole ecliptic longitude: 198° ± 6°
- Pole ecliptic latitude: 58° ± 6°
- Geometric albedo: 0.151 ± 0.057
- Temperature: ~164 K
- Spectral type: M
- Apparent magnitude: 9.71 (brightest?)
- Absolute magnitude (H): 7.02

129 Antigone is a large main-belt asteroid. Radar observations indicate that it is composed of almost pure nickel-iron. It and other similar asteroids probably originate from the core of a shattered Vesta-like planetesimal which had a differentiated interior. It was discovered by German-American astronomer C. H. F. Peters on February 5, 1873, and named after Antigone, the Theban princess in Greek mythology.

In 1979 a possible satellite of Antigone was suggested based on lightcurve data. A model constructed from these shows Antigone itself to be quite regularly shaped. In 1990, the asteroid was observed from the Collurania-Teramo Observatory, allowing a composite light curve to be produced that showed a rotation period of 4.9572 ± 0.0001 hours and a brightness variation of 0.34 ± 0.01 in magnitude. The ratio of the lengths of the major to minor axes for this asteroid were found to be 1.45 ±0.02.

10μ radiometric data collected from Kitt Peak in 1975 gave a diameter estimate of 114 km. Since 1985, a total of three stellar occultations by Antigone have been observed. A favorable occultation of a star on April 11, 1985, was observed from sites near Pueblo, Colorado, allowing a diameter estimate of 113.0 ± 4.2 km to be calculated.
