= 209 Dido =

Main-belt asteroid

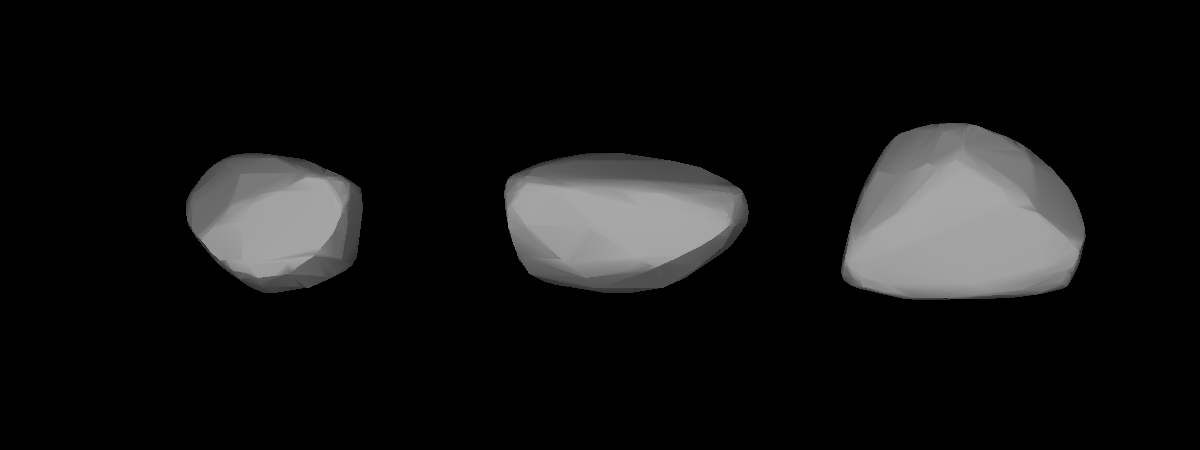

Discovery
- Discovered by: C. H. F. Peters
- Discovery date: 22 October 1879

Designations
- Pronunciation: /ˈdaɪdoʊ/
- Named after: Dido
- Alternative designations: A879 UC, 1909 AB; 1909 GB, 1912 RB
- Minor planet category: Main belt
- Adjectives: Didonian /daɪˈdoʊniən/

Orbital characteristics
- Epoch 31 July 2016 (JD 2457600.5)
- Uncertainty parameter 0
- Observation arc: 136.47 yr (49,845 d)
- Aphelion: 3.331 AU (498.3 Gm)
- Perihelion: 2.968 AU (444.1 Gm)
- Semi-major axis: 3.150 AU (471.2 Gm)
- Eccentricity: 0.057565
- Orbital period (sidereal): 5.59 yr (2,040.5 d)
- Average orbital speed: 16.79 km/s
- Mean anomaly: 311.722°
- Mean motion: 0° 10^{m} 34.738^{s} / day
- Inclination: 7.16997°
- Longitude of ascending node: 0.682681°
- Argument of perihelion: 248.387°

Physical characteristics
- Dimensions: 179±1 km 140.35±10.12 km (composite estimate)
- Mass: (2.38±0.37)×10^{18} kg (Note: Calculated from its standard gravitational parameter GM = 0.159±0.025 km^{3}/s^{2}.)
- Mean density: 0.80 g/cm^{3} (Note: Assuming a diameter of 179 km.)
- Synodic rotation period: 5.737 h (0.24 d)
- Geometric albedo: 0.028±0.004
- Spectral type: C
- Absolute magnitude (H): 8.24

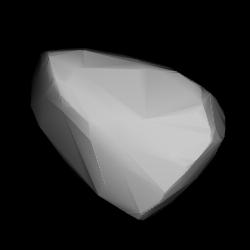
3D convex shape model of Dido

209 Dido is a main-belt asteroid with a diameter of 179±1 km. It was discovered by C. H. F. Peters on October 22, 1879, in Clinton, New York. The asteroid was named after the mythical Carthaginian queen Dido. This object is orbiting the Sun at a distance of 3.15 AU with an eccentricity (ovalness) of 0.058 and a period of 5.59 yr. The orbital plane is tilted at an angle of 7.2° to the plane of the ecliptic.

209 Dido is classified as a C-type asteroid and is probably composed of carbonaceous materials. Like many asteroids of its type, it has an extremely low albedo. infrared measurements show a large diameter of 179 km. Photometric observations at the Palmer Divide Observatory during 2005 showed a rotation period of 5.7366±0.0005 hours with a brightness variation of 0.17±0.02 in magnitude. The pole orientation in ecliptic coordinates, as determined from multiple light curve studies, is (β_{p}, λ_{p}) = (120°±6°, 66°±7°).

209 Dido has been observed to occult 4 stars between 2005 and 2023.
