= 196 Philomela =

Main-belt asteroid

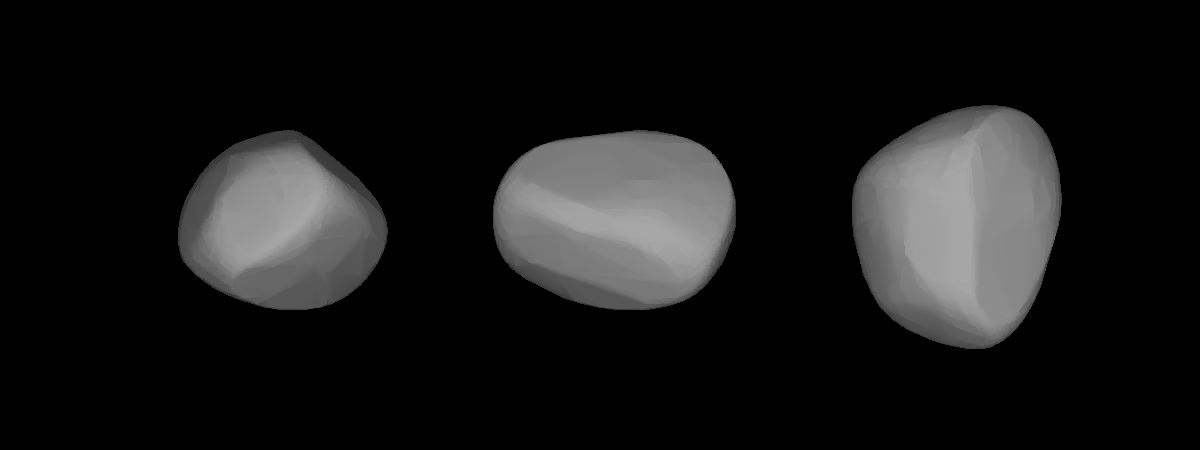
- A three-dimensional model of 196 Philomela based on its lightcurve

Discovery
- Discovered by: C. H. F. Peters, 1879
- Discovery date: 14 May 1879

Designations
- Pronunciation: /fɪloʊˈmiːlə/
- Alternative designations: A879 JA; 1934 JO
- Minor planet category: Main belt
- Adjectives: Philomelian /fɪloʊˈmiːliən/

Orbital characteristics
- Epoch 31 July 2016 (JD 2457600.5)
- Uncertainty parameter 0
- Observation arc: 136.91 yr (50005 d)
- Aphelion: 3.1723 AU (474.57 Gm)
- Perihelion: 3.0630 AU (458.22 Gm)
- Semi-major axis: 3.1177 AU (466.40 Gm)
- Eccentricity: 0.017530
- Orbital period (sidereal): 5.50 yr (2010.7 d)
- Mean anomaly: 276.49°
- Mean motion: 0° 10^{m} 44.544^{s} / day
- Inclination: 7.2554°
- Longitude of ascending node: 72.384°
- Argument of perihelion: 195.69°
- Earth MOID: 2.04771 AU (306.333 Gm)
- Jupiter MOID: 1.83421 AU (274.394 Gm)
- T_{Jupiter}: 3.204

Physical characteristics
- Dimensions: 145.29 ± 7.71 km (composite estimate); 144.6±4.1 km
- Mass: (4.58±0.36)×10^{18} kg (Note: Calculated from its standard gravitational parameter GM = 0.306±0.024 km^{3}/s^{2}.)
- Mean density: 2.90 g/cm^{3}
- Synodic rotation period: 8.3340 h (0.34725 d); 8.332827 hours
- Geometric albedo: 0.2299±0.023
- Spectral type: S
- Absolute magnitude (H): 6.54

196 Philomela is a large and bright main-belt asteroid. It was discovered by C. H. F. Peters on May 14, 1879, in Clinton, New York. The asteroid is named after Philomela, the woman who became a nightingale in Greek mythology.

This object is orbiting the Sun at a distance of 3.12 AU with a low eccentricity of 0.018 and an orbital period of 5.50 years. The orbital plane is inclined at an angle of 7.26° to the plane of the ecliptic. This is a stony S-type asteroid with a diameter of approximately 145 km. It is spinning with a rotation period of 8.334 hours.

In the late 1990s, a network of astronomers worldwide gathered light curve data that was ultimately used to derive the spin states and shape models of 10 new asteroids, including 196 Philomela. The shape model for this asteroid is described as asymmetrical and smooth, while the light curve varies by up to 0.4 in magnitude.

To date there have been two reported Philomelian stellar occultations.
