= 131 Vala =

Main-belt asteroid

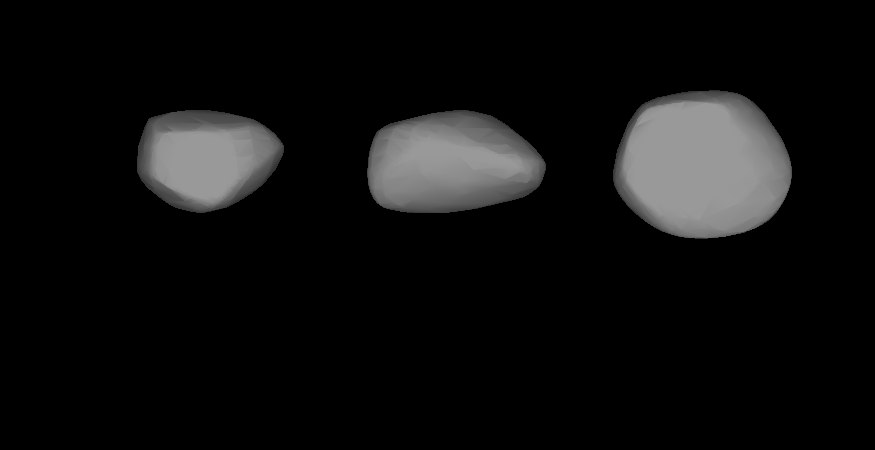
- A 3D lightcurve model of 131 Vala

Discovery
- Discovered by: Christian Heinrich Friedrich Peters
- Discovery site: Litchfield Observatory
- Discovery date: 24 May 1873

Designations
- Pronunciation: /ˈvɑːlə/
- Named after: vǫlva
- Alternative designations: A873 KA; 1945 KA; 1952 DS_{3}; 1953 QE
- Minor planet category: Main belt

Orbital characteristics
- Epoch 21 November 2025 (JD 2461000.5)
- Uncertainty parameter 0
- Observation arc: 152.54 yr
- Aphelion: 2.60 AU (389.00 Gm)
- Perihelion: 2.26 AU (338.50 Gm)
- Semi-major axis: 2.43 AU (363.75 Gm)
- Eccentricity: 0.069427
- Orbital period (sidereal): 3.79 yr (1,384.89 d)
- Average orbital speed: 19.08 km/s
- Mean anomaly: 92.165°
- Mean motion: 0° 15^{m} 35.784^{s} / day
- Inclination: 4.9632°
- Longitude of ascending node: 65.556°
- Argument of perihelion: 161.388°
- Earth MOID: 1.26 AU (187.95 Gm)
- Jupiter MOID: 2.38 AU (355.52 Gm)
- T_{Jupiter}: 3.499

Physical characteristics
- Dimensions: 40.44±1.8 km
- Mass: 6.9×10^{16} kg
- Equatorial surface gravity: 0.0113 m/s²
- Equatorial escape velocity: 0.0214 km/s
- Synodic rotation period: 5.1812 h (0.21588 d)
- Geometric albedo: 0.1051±0.010
- Temperature: ~178 K
- Spectral type: K (Bus)
- Absolute magnitude (H): 10.03

131 Vala is an asteroid located in the main asteroid belt. It was discovered by C. H. F. Peters on 24 May 1873, and derives its name from völva (vǫlva, lit. 'staff bearer'), a prophetess in Norse paganism. One observation of an occultation of a star by Vala is from Italy (26 May 2002). 10-μm radiometric data collected from Kitt Peak in 1975 gave a diameter estimate of 34 km.

== Discovery and naming ==
Vala was discovered on 24 May 1873 by German-American astronomer Christian Heinrich Friedrich Peters at Litchfield Observatory in New York State, United States. Peters announced the asteroid's discovery on 3 June in the journal Astronomische Nachrichten. The asteroid was given the name Vala, after the prophetesses (Old Norse: vǫlva) from Norse paganism.

== Orbit ==
Vala orbits the Sun at an average distance of 2.43 astronomical units (AU), taking 3.79 Earth years to complete one orbit. This places it in the main asteroid belt, where it is classified as a background asteroid since it does not have any known relationship to an asteroid family. Its orbit has an inclination of 4.96° with respect to the ecliptic and an eccentricity of 0.07. Its distance from the Sun ranges from 2.26 AU at perihelion to 2.60 AU at aphelion.

== Physical characteristics ==
In the Tholen classification system, it is categorized as an SU-type asteroid, while the Bus asteroid taxonomy system lists it as a K-type asteroid. Photometric observations of this asteroid during 2007 at the Organ Mesa Observatory in Las Cruces, New Mexico were used to create a "nearly symmetric bimodal" light curve plot. This showed a rotation period of 10.359 ± 0.001 hours and a brightness variation of 0.09 ± 0.02 magnitude during each cycle. The result is double the 5.18-hour period reported in the JPL Small-Body Database.
