= 123 Brunhild =

Main-belt asteroid

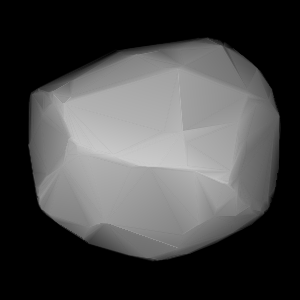

Discovery
- Discovered by: Christian Heinrich Friedrich Peters
- Discovery date: 31 July 1872

Designations
- Pronunciation: /ˈbruːnhɪld/
- Named after: Brynhildr
- Alternative designations: A872 OB
- Minor planet category: Main belt

Orbital characteristics
- Epoch 31 July 2016 (JD 2457600.5)
- Uncertainty parameter 0
- Observation arc: 143.71 yr (52490 days)
- Aphelion: 3.0183 AU (451.53 Gm)
- Perihelion: 2.37594 AU (355.436 Gm)
- Semi-major axis: 2.69710 AU (403.480 Gm)
- Eccentricity: 0.11907
- Orbital period (sidereal): 4.43 yr (1617.9 d)
- Average orbital speed: 18.08 km/s
- Mean anomaly: 96.8286°
- Mean motion: 0° 13^{m} 21.054^{s} / day
- Inclination: 6.4142°
- Longitude of ascending node: 307.834°
- Argument of perihelion: 125.960°
- Earth MOID: 1.39621 AU (208.870 Gm)
- Jupiter MOID: 2.22588 AU (332.987 Gm)
- T_{Jupiter}: 3.350

Physical characteristics
- Dimensions: 48 km
- Mean radius: 23.985±1.3 km
- Mass: 1.2×10^{17} kg (assumed)
- Equatorial surface gravity: 0.0134 m/s^{2}
- Equatorial escape velocity: 0.0254 km/s
- Synodic rotation period: 10.04 h (0.418 d)
- Geometric albedo: 0.2134±0.026
- Temperature: ~170 K
- Spectral type: S
- Apparent magnitude: 11.77 to 14.88
- Absolute magnitude (H): 8.9

123 Brunhild is a stony S-type main-belt asteroid. It was discovered by German-American astronomer C. H. F. Peters on July 31, 1872, and named after Brünnehilde, a Valkyrie in Norse mythology. Brunhild has been mistaken for the non-existent variable star KN Gem.

In 1983, 123 Brunhild was observed photometrically from the Observatoire de Haute-Provence, producing an irregular light curve that showed eight extremes, including two minima and two maxima that were more accentuated than the others. This curve indicates an irregular shape or possibly areas with higher albedo, with a rotation period of 10.04 ± 0.02 hours and a brightness variation of 0.16 ± 0.01 in magnitude.

Based upon IRAS observations, the estimated diameter of this asteroid is 47.97 ± 2.6 km with a geometric albedo of 0.2134 ± 0.026. A smaller diameter value of 41.33 ± 1.73 km is obtained from the Midcourse Space Experiment observations, with an accordingly higher albedo of 0.2886 ± 0.0247.
