= 98 Ianthe =

Main-belt asteroid

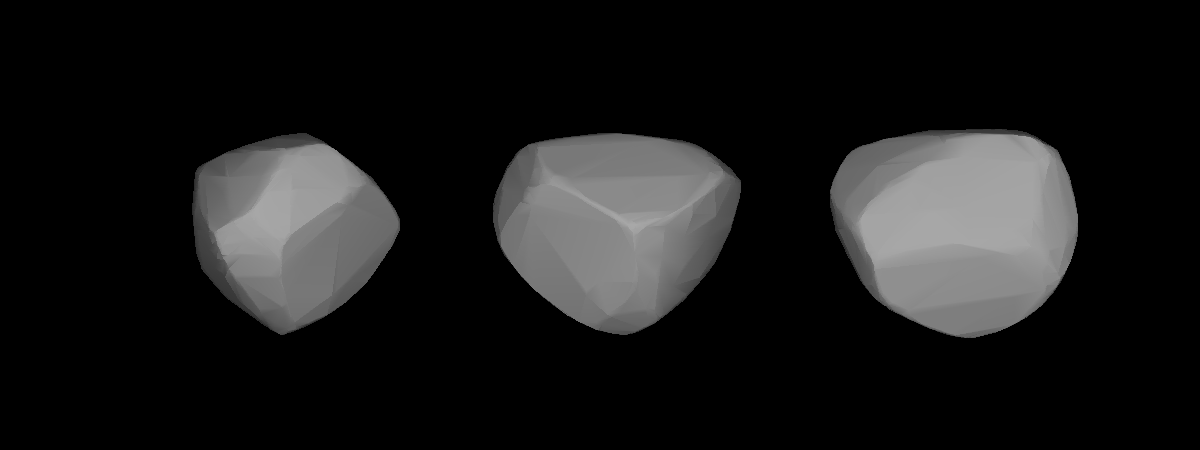
- Three-dimensional model of 98 Ianthe created based on its lightcurve

Discovery
- Discovered by: Christian Heinrich Friedrich Peters
- Discovery date: 18 April 1868

Designations
- Pronunciation: /aɪˈænθiː/
- Named after: Ianthe
- Minor planet category: Main belt
- Adjectives: Ianthean /aɪənˈθiːən/

Orbital characteristics
- Epoch 31 July 2016 (JD 2457600.5)
- Uncertainty parameter 0
- Observation arc: 145.23 yr (53047 d)
- Aphelion: 3.18807 AU (476.928 Gm)
- Perihelion: 2.18872 AU (327.428 Gm)
- Semi-major axis: 2.68839 AU (402.177 Gm)
- Eccentricity: 0.18586
- Orbital period (sidereal): 4.41 yr (1610.0 d)
- Average orbital speed: 18.01 km/s
- Mean anomaly: 262.019°
- Mean motion: 0° 13^{m} 24.949^{s} / day
- Inclination: 15.5778°
- Longitude of ascending node: 354.000°
- Argument of perihelion: 158.686°
- Earth MOID: 1.20327 AU (180.007 Gm)
- Jupiter MOID: 1.81554 AU (271.601 Gm)
- T_{Jupiter}: 3.296

Physical characteristics
- Mean diameter: 105.48 ± 3.29 km (composite estimate); 104.45±1.8 km
- Mass: (8.53 ± 1.65) × 10^{17} kg (composite estimate) (2.26±0.52)×10^{18} kg (Note: Calculated from its standard gravitational parameter GM = 0.151±0.035 km^{3}/s^{2}.)
- Mean density: 1.39 ± 0.30 g/cm^{3} 1.85 g/cm^{3} (Note: Assuming a diameter of 133 km.)
- Equatorial surface gravity: 0.0292 m/s^{2} (0.00298 g_{0})
- Equatorial escape velocity: 0.0552 km/s
- Synodic rotation period: 16.479 h (0.6866 d)
- Geometric albedo: 0.0471±0.002; 0.047
- Temperature: ~170 K
- Spectral type: C
- Absolute magnitude (H): 8.84

98 Ianthe is a large main-belt asteroid, named for three figures in Greek mythology. It is very dark and is composed of carbonates. It was one of the numerous (for his time—the 19th century) discoveries by C. H. F. Peters, who found it on April 18, 1868, from Clinton, New York.

This body is orbiting the Sun with a period of 4.41 years and an eccentricity of 0.186. The orbital plane is inclined at an angle of 15.6° to the plane of the ecliptic. Measurements of the cross-section dimension yield a size of around 105 km. Photometric observations of this asteroid during 2007 at the Organ Mesa Observatory in Las Cruces, New Mexico were used to create a light curve plot. This showed a synodic rotation period of 16.479±0.001 hours and a brightness variation of 0.27±0.02 magnitude during each cycle. It is classified as a C-type asteroid, indicating a dark, carbonaceous surface.

The detection of a candidate moon orbiting 98 Ianthe was announced in 2004.
