= 77 Frigga =

Main-belt asteroid

Discovery
- Discovered by: Christian Heinrich Friedrich Peters
- Discovery date: 12 November 1862

Designations
- Pronunciation: /ˈfrɪɡə/
- Named after: Frigg
- Minor planet category: Main belt

Orbital characteristics
- Epoch 9 June 2026 (JD 2461200.5)
- Uncertainty parameter 0
- Aphelion: 3.0236 AU
- Perihelion: 2.3118 AU
- Semi-major axis: 2.6677 AU
- Eccentricity: 0.1334
- Orbital period (sidereal): 1591.49 d (4.3573 yr)
- Average orbital speed: 18.15 km/s
- Mean anomaly: 152.085°
- Inclination: 2.4211°
- Longitude of ascending node: 1.0472°
- Argument of perihelion: 61.1332°
- T_{Jupiter}: 3.368

Physical characteristics
- Dimensions: 60.0 × 74.0 km
- Mean diameter: 68 ± 4 km (composite estimate); 61.390 ± 0.177 km
- Mass: (4.16 ± 2.30/1)×10^{17} kg (3.15±0.75)×10^{17} kg (Note: Calculated from its standard gravitational parameter GM = 0.021±0.005 km^{3}/s^{2}.)
- Mean density: 3.434 ± 1.901/0.827 g/cm^{3} (Note: Assuming a diameter of 61.4 km.); 2.60 g/cm^{3}
- Equatorial surface gravity: 0.0074 m/s²
- Equatorial escape velocity: 0.0301 km/s
- Synodic rotation period: 9.0032 hr
- Geometric albedo: 0.15 ± 0.01 (composite estimate); 0.177 ± 0.025; 0.144
- Spectral type: M
- Absolute magnitude (H): 8.65

77 Frigga is a large, M-type, possibly metallic main-belt asteroid. It was discovered by the German-American astronomer C. H. F. Peters on 12 November 1862. The object is named after Frigg, the Norse goddess. The asteroid is orbiting the Sun with a period of 4.36 years and completes a rotation on its axis every nine hours.

Frigga has been studied by radar. The spectra of this asteroid displays a feature at a wavelength of 3 μm, indicating the presence of hydrated minerals on the surface. The near infrared spectrum is reddish and shows no spectral absorption features. Potential analogs of this spectrum include enstatite chondrites and nickel-iron meteorites.

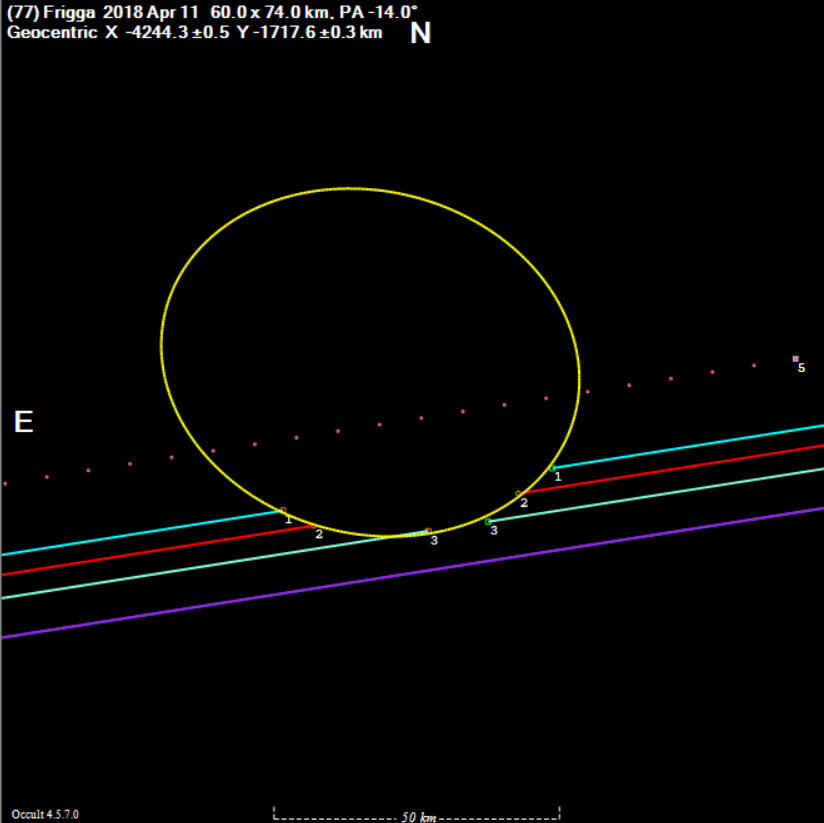
A three-chord occultation plot of the asteroid 77 Frigga, observed 2018 April 11th from eastern Australia.

Since 1999 there have been four stellar occultations by the asteroid. The first three were single chord observations, and the fourth was a 3-chord observation, and a miss. The best fit ellipse measures 60.0 × 74.0 kilometres at PA −14 degrees.
