= 189 Phthia =

Main-belt asteroid

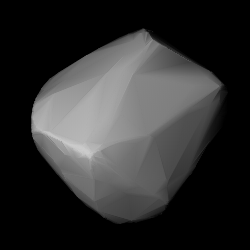
- 3D convex shape model of 189 Phthia

Discovery
- Discovered by: C. H. F. Peters
- Discovery site: Clinton, New York
- Discovery date: 9 September 1878

Designations
- Pronunciation: /ˈθaɪ.ə/
- Alternative designations: A878 RA
- Minor planet category: main-belt

Orbital characteristics
- Epoch 31 July 2016 (JD 2457600.5)
- Uncertainty parameter 0
- Observation arc: 136.18 yr (49739 d)
- Aphelion: 2.5415 AU (380.20 Gm)
- Perihelion: 2.3597 AU (353.01 Gm)
- Semi-major axis: 2.4506 AU (366.60 Gm)
- Eccentricity: 0.037105
- Orbital period (sidereal): 3.84 yr (1401.2 d)
- Mean anomaly: 336.98°
- Mean motion: 0° 15^{m} 24.912^{s} / day
- Inclination: 5.1774°
- Longitude of ascending node: 203.42°
- Argument of perihelion: 168.03°

Physical characteristics
- Dimensions: 37.66±2.0 km 40.91 ± 1.36 km
- Mass: (3.84 ± 0.81) × 10^{16} kg
- Mean density: 1.07 ± 0.25 g/cm^{3}
- Synodic rotation period: 22.346 h (0.9311 d)
- Geometric albedo: 0.2310±0.027; 0.1566 ± 0.0349
- Spectral type: S (Tholen)
- Absolute magnitude (H): 9.33, 9.60

189 Phthia is a bright-coloured, rocky main belt asteroid that was discovered by German-American astronomer Christian Heinrich Friedrich Peters on September 9, 1878, in Clinton, New York, and named after Phthia, a region of ancient Greece.

Photometric observations of this asteroid at the Organ Mesa Observatory in Las Cruces, New Mexico, during 2008 gave a light curve with a period of 22.346 ± 0.001 hours and a brightness variation of 0.26 ± 0.02 in magnitude.
