= 261 Prymno =

Main belt asteroid

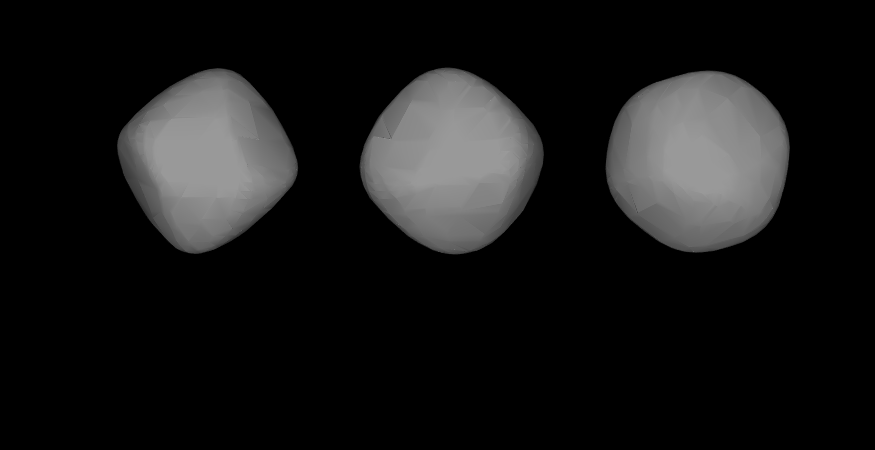
- Lightcurve-based 3D model of 261 Prymno

Discovery
- Discovered by: C. H. F. Peters
- Discovery date: 31 October 1886

Designations
- Pronunciation: /ˈprɪmnoʊ/
- Named after: Prymno
- Alternative designations: A886 UA
- Minor planet category: Main belt
- Adjectives: Prymnoian /prɪmˈnoʊ.iən/

Orbital characteristics
- Epoch 31 July 2016 (JD 2457600.5)
- Uncertainty parameter 0
- Observation arc: 98.79 yr (36082 d)
- Aphelion: 2.54054 AU (380.059 Gm)
- Perihelion: 2.12336 AU (317.650 Gm)
- Semi-major axis: 2.33195 AU (348.855 Gm)
- Eccentricity: 0.089449
- Orbital period (sidereal): 3.56 yr (1300.7 d)
- Average orbital speed: 19.51 km/s
- Mean anomaly: 35.7611°
- Mean motion: 0° 16^{m} 36.386^{s} / day
- Inclination: 3.63567°
- Longitude of ascending node: 96.6415°
- Argument of perihelion: 65.9065°

Physical characteristics
- Mean diameter: 50 ± 5 km (composite estimate)
- Mass: (3.45±0.90)×10^{17} kg (Note: Calculated from its standard gravitational parameter GM = 0.023±0.006 km^{3}/s^{2}.)
- Mean density: 5.15 g/cm^{3}
- Synodic rotation period: 8.002 h (0.3334 d)
- Geometric albedo: 0.11 ± 0.02 (composite estimate)
- Spectral type: B
- Absolute magnitude (H): 9.44

261 Prymno is a somewhat large Main belt asteroid. It is classified as a B-type asteroid and probably has a primitive composition not unlike common C-type carbonaceous asteroids.

It was discovered by C. H. F. Peters on October 31, 1886, in Clinton, New York and was named after the Greek Oceanid Prymno.
