= 202 Chryseïs =

Main-belt asteroid

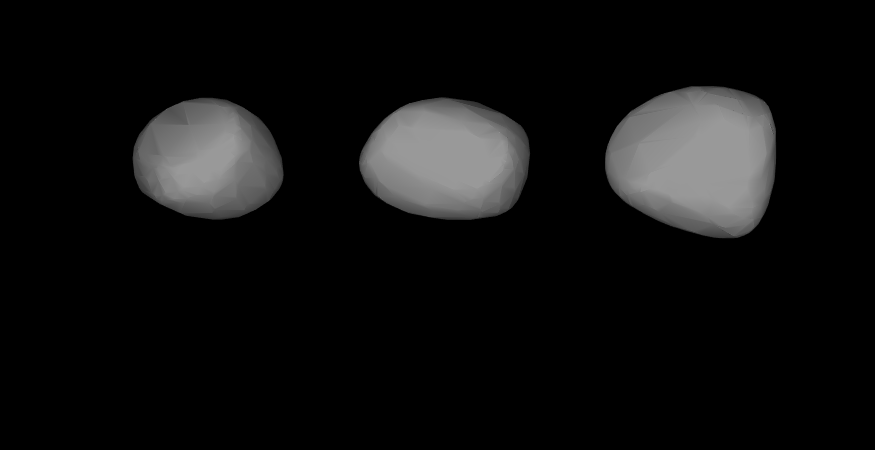
- Lightcurve-based 3D model of 202 Chryseïs

Discovery
- Discovered by: C. H. F. Peters
- Discovery date: 11 September 1879

Designations
- Pronunciation: /kraɪˈsiːɪs/
- Named after: Chryseis
- Alternative designations: A879 RA, A901 TA; 1935 BL
- Minor planet category: Main belt

Orbital characteristics
- Epoch 31 July 2016 (JD 2457600.5)
- Uncertainty parameter 0
- Observation arc: 136.57 yr (49881 d)
- Aphelion: 3.3859 AU (506.52 Gm)
- Perihelion: 2.7567 AU (412.40 Gm)
- Semi-major axis: 3.0713 AU (459.46 Gm)
- Eccentricity: 0.10244
- Orbital period (sidereal): 5.38 yr (1966.0 d)
- Average orbital speed: 16.99 km/s
- Mean anomaly: 11.1527°
- Mean motion: 0° 10^{m} 59.196^{s} / day
- Inclination: 8.8535°
- Longitude of ascending node: 136.848°
- Argument of perihelion: 1.3159°

Physical characteristics
- Mean diameter: 90+4 −3 km (pole solution 1); 90+3 −3 km (pole solution 2)
- Mass: (1.32±0.31)×10^{18} kg (Note: Calculated from its standard gravitational parameter GM = 0.088±0.021 km^{3}/s^{2}.)
- Mean density: 3.45 g/cm^{3} (calculated)
- Synodic rotation period: 23.67025±0.00006 h (pole solution 1); 23.67028±0.00004 h (pole solution 2)
- Pole ecliptic longitude: 94° ± 1° or 261° ± 1°
- Pole ecliptic latitude: −49° ± 4° or −34° ± 4°
- Geometric albedo: 0.22+0.03 −0.01 (pole solution 1); 0.22±0.01 (pole solution 2)
- Spectral type: S
- Absolute magnitude (H): 7.42

202 Chryseïs is a large, lightly coloured main belt asteroid that is probably composed of silicate rocks. It was discovered by C. H. F. Peters on September 11, 1879, in Clinton, New York, and was named after the mythical Trojan woman Chryseis. 202 Chryseïs is orbiting the Sun with a semimajor axis of 3.07 AU and an eccentricity of 0.102, which brings it as close to the Sun as 2.76 AU and as far away as 3.39 AU during the course of its 5.38 year orbital period. The orbital plane is inclined at an angle of 8.85° relative to the plane of the ecliptic.

The rotation period for this asteroid is close to a day long, so the construction of a complete light curve requires photometric observations from multiple locations at widely spaced latitudes. This task was completed in January and February, 2011, yielding a synodic rotation period of 23.670 ± 0.001 h, with a brightness variation of 0.20 ± 0.02 in magnitude. This is a stony, S-type asteroid. Based on infrared observations, it has a diameter of 86.15±2.4 km.
