= 259 Aletheia =

Large main-belt asteroid

Discovery
- Discovered by: C. H. F. Peters
- Discovery site: Litchfield Obs., Clinton
- Discovery date: 28 June 1886

Designations
- Pronunciation: /æləˈθiːə/
- Named after: Aletheia
- Alternative designations: A886 MA, 1947 LD
- Minor planet category: main-belt
- Adjectives: Aletheian
- Symbol: Astrological symbol

Orbital characteristics
- Epoch 27 June 2015 (JD 2457200.5)
- Uncertainty parameter 0
- Observation arc: 117.00 yr (42,736 days)
- Aphelion: 3.5353 AU
- Perihelion: 2.7347 AU
- Semi-major axis: 3.1350 AU
- Eccentricity: 0.1276
- Orbital period (sidereal): 5.55 yr (2027.5 days)
- Mean anomaly: 71.260°
- Inclination: 10.813°
- Longitude of ascending node: 86.864°
- Argument of perihelion: 168.07°
- Earth MOID: 1.7207 AU

Physical characteristics
- Dimensions: 190.05±6.82 km (composite estimate); 174.32±1.05 km
- Mass: (7.79±0.43)×10^{18} kg (composite estimate) (4.43±0.45)×10^{18} kg (Note: Calculated from its standard gravitational parameter GM = 0.296±0.030 km^{3}/s^{2}.)
- Mean density: 2.16 ± 0.26 g/cm^{3} 1.60 g/cm^{3} (Note: Assuming a diameter of 174 km.)
- Synodic rotation period: 8.143 h
- Geometric albedo: 0.0436
- Spectral type: B–V = 0.698; U–B = 0.311; CP (Tholen), X (SMASS)
- Absolute magnitude (H): 7.76

259 Aletheia is a very large main-belt asteroid that was discovered by German–American astronomer Christian Peters on June 28, 1886, at Litchfield Observatory, Clinton, New York. The dark and heterogeneously composed X-type (Tholen: CP-type) asteroid contains primitive carbonaceous materials, responsible for its low albedo of 0.04. Aletheia measures about 185 kilometers in diameter and belongs to the largest asteroids of the main-belt. It has a semi-major axis of 3.1 AU and an orbit inclined by 11 degrees with a period of 5.55 years.

Richard P. Binzel and Schelte Bus further added to the knowledge about this asteroid in a lightwave survey published in 2003. This project was known as Small Main-belt Asteroid Spectroscopic Survey, Phase II or SMASSII, which built on a previous survey of the main-belt asteroids. The visible-wavelength (0.435-0.925 micrometre) spectra data was gathered between August 1993 and March 1999.

Lightcurve data has also been recorded by observers at the Antelope Hill Observatory, which has been designated as an official observatory by the Minor Planet Center.

It is named after the Greek goddess of truth, Aletheia, the daughter of Zeus and one of the nurses of Apollo.
