= 109 Felicitas =

Main-belt asteroid

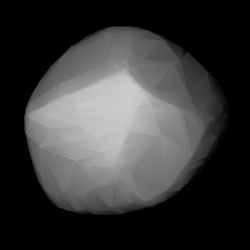
- 3D convex shape model of 109 Felicitas

Discovery
- Discovered by: Christian Heinrich Friedrich Peters
- Discovery date: 9 October 1869

Designations
- Pronunciation: /fɪˈlɪsɪtæs/
- Named after: Felicitas
- Alternative designations: A869 TA; 1911 HA
- Minor planet category: Main belt

Orbital characteristics
- Epoch 31 July 2016 (JD 2457600.5)
- Uncertainty parameter 0
- Observation arc: 146.39 yr (53470 d)
- Aphelion: 3.4971 AU (523.16 Gm)
- Perihelion: 1.89658 AU (283.724 Gm)
- Semi-major axis: 2.6968 AU (403.44 Gm)
- Eccentricity: 0.29674
- Orbital period (sidereal): 4.43 yr (1617.6 d)
- Average orbital speed: 17.73 km/s
- Mean anomaly: 30.6904°
- Mean motion: 0° 13^{m} 21.18^{s} / day
- Inclination: 7.8813°
- Longitude of ascending node: 3.1617°
- Argument of perihelion: 56.392°
- Earth MOID: 0.920053 AU (137.6380 Gm)
- Jupiter MOID: 1.95452 AU (292.392 Gm)
- T_{Jupiter}: 3.291

Physical characteristics
- Mean diameter: 82.38±5.09 km (composite estimate); 89.44±2.5 km 88.971 km
- Mass: (1.69±0.350)×10^{17} kg (composite estimate) (7.5±7.5)×10^{17} kg (Note: Calculated from its standard gravitational parameter GM = 0.05±0.05 km^{3}/s^{2}.) (SB441)
- Mean density: 0.58±0.16 g/cm^{3} 2.0–2.6 g/cm^{3} (calculated)
- Equatorial surface gravity: 0.0250 m/s^{2}
- Equatorial escape velocity: 0.0473 km/s
- Synodic rotation period: 13.191 h (0.5496 d)
- Geometric albedo: 0.0699±0.004; 0.07 ± 0.02
- Temperature: ~170 K
- Spectral type: GC (Tholen)
- Absolute magnitude (H): 8.75, 8.759

109 Felicitas is a dark and fairly large main-belt asteroid. It was discovered by German-American astronomer C. H. F. Peters on 9 October 1869, and named after Felicitas, the Roman goddess of success. The only observed stellar occultation by Felicitas is one from Japan on 29 March 2003.

This body is orbiting the Sun with a period of 4.43 years and an eccentricity (ovalness) of 0.3. Its orbital plane is inclined by 7.9° from the plane of the ecliptic. 109 Felicitas is classified as a carbonaceous GC-type asteroid. It is spinning with a rotation period of 13.2 hours. During 2002, 109 Felicitas was observed by radar from the Arecibo Observatory. The return signal matched an effective diameter of 89 ± 9 km. This is consistent with the asteroid dimensions computed through other means.
