= 160 Una =

Main-belt asteroid

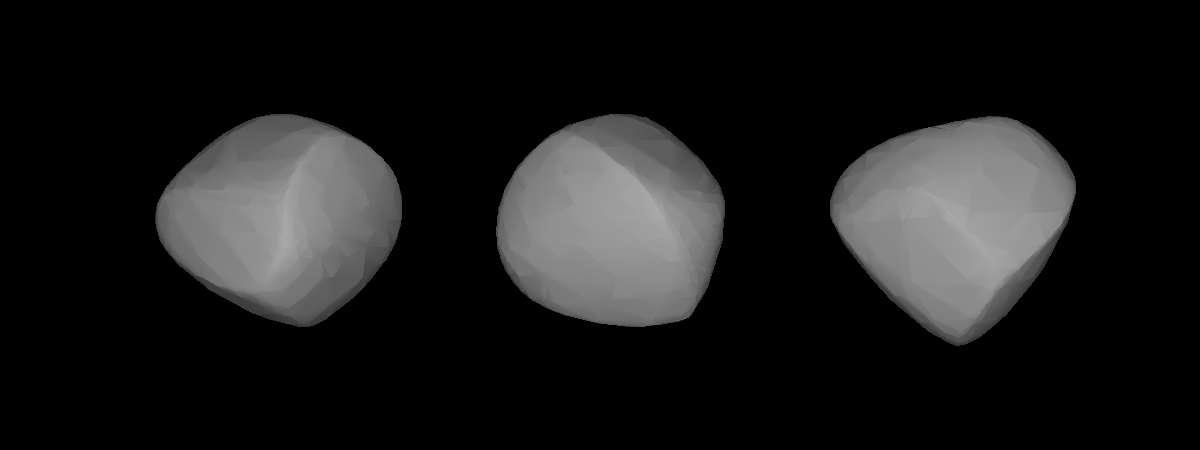
- A three-dimensional model of 160 Una based on its lightcurve

Discovery
- Discovered by: C. H. F. Peters
- Discovery date: 20 February 1876

Designations
- Pronunciation: /ˈjuːnə/
- Minor planet category: Main belt

Orbital characteristics
- Epoch 31 July 2016 (JD 2457600.5)
- Uncertainty parameter 0
- Observation arc: 118.30 yr (43209 d)
- Aphelion: 2.90877 AU (435.146 Gm)
- Perihelion: 2.54727 AU (381.066 Gm)
- Semi-major axis: 2.72802 AU (408.106 Gm)
- Eccentricity: 0.066257
- Orbital period (sidereal): 4.51 yr (1645.8 d)
- Average orbital speed: 18.01 km/s
- Mean anomaly: 144.472°
- Mean motion: 0° 13^{m} 7.471^{s} / day
- Inclination: 3.82512°
- Longitude of ascending node: 8.60989°
- Argument of perihelion: 52.8418°
- Earth MOID: 1.56031 AU (233.419 Gm)
- Jupiter MOID: 2.30107 AU (344.235 Gm)
- T_{Jupiter}: 3.349

Physical characteristics
- Dimensions: 81.24±2.1 km
- Mass: (6.1±1.2)×10^{17} kg (Note: Calculated from its standard gravitational parameter GM = 0.041±0.008 km^{3}/s^{2}.)
- Mean density: 2.19 g/cm^{3}
- Equatorial surface gravity: 0.0227 m/s^{2}
- Equatorial escape velocity: 0.0429 km/s
- Synodic rotation period: 11.033 h (0.4597 d); 0.234 d (5.61 h)
- Geometric albedo: 0.0625±0.003; 0.063
- Temperature: ~170 K
- Spectral type: C
- Absolute magnitude (H): 9.08, 8.95

160 Una is a fairly large and dark, primitive main belt asteroid that was discovered by German-American astronomer C. H. F. Peters on February 20, 1876, in Clinton, New York. It is named after a character in Edmund Spenser's epic poem The Faerie Queene (1590). This minor planet is orbiting the Sun at a distance of 2.73 AU with an eccentricity of 0.07. The orbital plane is inclined at an angle of 3.83° to the plane of the ecliptic.

In the Tholen classification system it is categorized as a CX-type, while the Bus asteroid taxonomy system lists it as an Xk asteroid. Photometric observations of this asteroid made at the Torino Observatory in Italy during 1990–1991 were used to determine a synodic rotation period of 5.61 ± 0.01 hours. It has an estimated diameter of about 81 km.
