= Christian Heinrich Friedrich Peters =

German-American academic and astronomer (1813–1890)

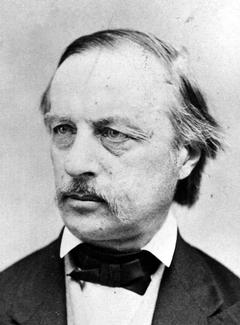
- Born: September 19, 1813; Koldenbüttel, Duchy of Schleswig
- Died: July 18, 1890 (aged 76); Utica, New York
- Known for: asteroids
- Scientific career
- Fields: astronomy
- Workplaces: Hamilton College

Signature
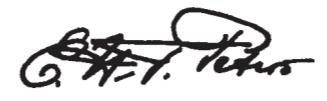

Christian Heinrich Friedrich Peters (September 19, 1813 – July 18, 1890) was a German–American astronomer and professor at Hamilton College, New York, and a pioneer in the study and visual discovery of asteroids. His name is often given as C. H. F. Peters.

== Biography ==
He was born in Koldenbüttel in Schleswig, then part of Denmark, but which was later annexed to Germany. His younger brother was the German explorer Wilhelm Peters. He received a Ph.D from the University of Berlin in 1836 and thereafter continued his studies in Göttingen with the renowned mathematician Karl Friedrich Gauss. From 1838 to 1843 he was engaged in surveys of Mount Etna, in Sicily, where he also made astronomical observations, and afterwards participated in the complete geodetic survey of the island.

During the Revolutions of 1848, Peters became involved with some of the radical, antimonarchical groups in Sicily, which brought him to the attention of authorities. He subsequently fled to France and eventually to the Ottoman Empire, where he became a government advisor. At the suggestion of the resident U.S. consul in Istanbul, George P. Marsh, he emigrated to the United States in 1854. After an appointment as director of the new Dudley Observatory in Albany fell through, he made his way to Clinton, New York, where he was made director of the Litchfield Observatory at Hamilton College in 1858, and professor of astronomy in 1867. He was the first member of the Hamilton faculty to hold a Ph.D degree.

In 1874, Peters headed a United States Naval Observatory expedition to Queenstown, New Zealand, to observe the Transit of Venus. The visit is marked with a plaque, campaigned for by Sarah Salmond.

In 1878, Peters was elected as a member of the American Philosophical Society.

While working at Hamilton College, he was a prolific discoverer of asteroids, discovering 48 of them, beginning with 72 Feronia in 1861 and ending with 287 Nephthys in 1889. Besides asteroids, he co-discovered the periodic comet 80P/Peters–Hartley, and also discovered various nebulae and galaxies.

== Star Catalog Controversy ==
Beginning in 1889, Peters was involved in litigation with his former student and assistant Charles A. Borst, in what became known as the "Great Star-Catalog Case". While working for Peters as assistant director of the Litchfield Observatory, Borst had spent his spare time gathering an extensive amount of data for a new and revised star chart based on preliminary work done by Peters. When it came time to publish the results, however, Peters attempted to claim the entire project as his own, arguing that Borst was merely an employee and not a formal collaborator and that the research was his property as head of the observatory. Peters sued to force Borst to turn over the observational data he had collected. The judge found for Peters, but many astronomers and newspapers sided with Borst and Peters died not long after. The initial judgment was ultimately reversed on appeal and a new trial was ordered, but it never took place. The eminent astronomer Simon Newcomb devotes a chapter in his memoirs to Peters, as an object lesson in how great scientific talent and poor ethical standards may coexist in a single individual.

He died July 18, 1890, in Utica. Historian William Sheehan notes, "Peters was found lying, a half-burned cigar at his fingertips, on the doorstep of the building where he lodged; observing cap on his head, he had fallen in the line of duty, on the way to the observatory the night before."

== Honors ==
Main-belt asteroid 100007 Peters, discovered by Eric Walter Elst at La Silla Observatory in 1988, was named in his memory, based on a suggestion by French amateur astronomer Michel-Alain Combes (born 1942). The asteroid measures approximately 7.5 kilometers in diameter and belongs to the carbonaceous Alauda family. The official naming citation was published by the Minor Planet Center on 5 January 2015 (M.P.C. 91792).

== List of discovered minor planets ==
Between 1861 and 1889, C. H. F. Peters discovered 48 asteroids at Litchfield Observatory (789) at Hamilton College, New York, where he enjoyed the title "Litchfield professor of astronomy".

72 Feronia	29 May 1861	list
75 Eurydike	22 September 1862	list
77 Frigga	12 November 1862	list
85 Io	19 September 1865	list
88 Thisbe	15 June 1866	list
92 Undina	7 July 1867	list
98 Ianthe	18 April 1868	list
102 Miriam	22 August 1868	list
109 Felicitas	9 October 1869	list
111 Ate	14 August 1870	list

112 Iphigenia	19 September 1870	list
114 Kassandra	23 July 1871	list
116 Sirona	8 September 1871	list
122 Gerda	31 July 1872	list
123 Brunhild	31 July 1872	list
124 Alkeste	23 August 1872	list
129 Antigone	5 February 1873	list
130 Elektra	17 February 1873	list
131 Vala	24 May 1873	list
135 Hertha	18 February 1874	list

144 Vibilia	3 June 1875	list
145 Adeona	3 June 1875	list
160 Una	20 February 1876	list
165 Loreley	9 August 1876	list
166 Rhodope	15 August 1876	list
167 Urda	28 August 1876	list
176 Iduna	14 October 1877	list
185 Eunike	1 March 1878	list
188 Menippe	18 June 1878	list
189 Phthia	9 September 1878	list

190 Ismene	22 September 1878	list
191 Kolga	30 September 1878	list
194 Prokne	21 March 1879	list
196 Philomela	14 May 1879	list
199 Byblis	9 July 1879	list
200 Dynamene	27 July 1879	list
202 Chryseïs	11 September 1879	list
203 Pompeja	25 September 1879	list
206 Hersilia	13 October 1879	list
209 Dido	22 October 1879	list

213 Lilaea	16 February 1880	list
234 Barbara	12 August 1883	list
249 Ilse	16 August 1885	list
259 Aletheia	28 June 1886	list
261 Prymno	31 October 1886	list
264 Libussa	22 December 1886	list
270 Anahita	8 October 1887	list
287 Nephthys	25 August 1889	list
