= 188 Menippe =

Main-belt asteroid

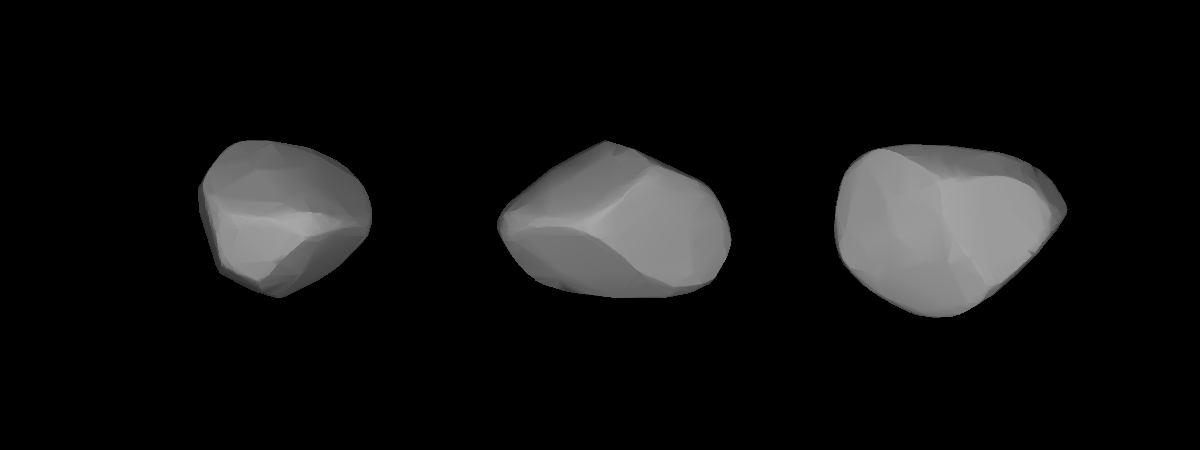
- A three-dimensional model of 188 Menippe based on its lightcurve

Discovery
- Discovered by: C. H. F. Peters, 1878
- Discovery date: 18 June 1878

Designations
- Pronunciation: /mɛˈnɪpiː/
- Alternative designations: A878 MA; 1897 QA; 1948 WQ
- Minor planet category: Main belt

Orbital characteristics
- Epoch 31 July 2016 (JD 2457600.5)
- Uncertainty parameter 0
- Observation arc: 100.84 yr (36833 d)
- Aphelion: 3.2542 AU (486.82 Gm)
- Perihelion: 2.2691 AU (339.45 Gm)
- Semi-major axis: 2.7617 AU (413.14 Gm)
- Eccentricity: 0.17835
- Orbital period (sidereal): 4.59 yr (1676.3 d)
- Mean anomaly: 346.69°
- Mean motion: 0° 12^{m} 53.1^{s} / day
- Inclination: 11.703°
- Longitude of ascending node: 240.91°
- Argument of perihelion: 70.177°
- Earth MOID: 1.286 AU (192.4 Gm)
- Jupiter MOID: 2.07085 AU (309.795 Gm)
- T_{Jupiter}: 3.288

Physical characteristics
- Mean radius: 19.305±0.5 km
- Synodic rotation period: 11.98 h (0.499 d)
- Geometric albedo: 0.2431±0.013
- Spectral type: S
- Absolute magnitude (H): 9.22

188 Menippe is a main belt asteroid. The object has a bright surface and rocky composition. It was discovered by C. H. F. Peters on June 18, 1878, in Clinton, New York. The asteroid was named after Menippe, one of the daughters of Orion in Greek mythology.

This asteroid is orbiting the Sun at a distance of 2.76 AU with a moderate eccentricity of 0.178 and an orbital period of 4.59 years. The orbital plane is inclined at an angle of 11.7° to the plane of the ecliptic. Based on infrared measurements, it has a diameter of approximately 35.75 km. The spectrum matches a stony S-type asteroid.

Photometric observations during 2010 showed a synodic rotation period of 11.98 ± 0.02 hours and a brightness variation of 0.28 ± 0.02 in magnitude. Because the rotation period is close to twelve hours, observations were needed at two widely separated observatories in order to build a light curve for the complete rotation.
