= 206 Hersilia =

Asteroid

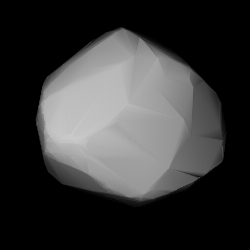
- 3D convex shape model of 206 Hersilia

Discovery
- Discovered by: C. H. F. Peters
- Discovery date: 13 October 1879

Designations
- Pronunciation: /hərˈsɪliə/
- Named after: Hersilia
- Alternative designations: A879 TC, 1961 WG; 1974 PM
- Minor planet category: Main belt

Orbital characteristics
- Epoch 31 July 2016 (JD 2457600.5)
- Uncertainty parameter 0
- Observation arc: 136.34 yr (49798 d)
- Aphelion: 2.84299 AU (425.305 Gm)
- Perihelion: 2.63811 AU (394.656 Gm)
- Semi-major axis: 2.74055 AU (409.980 Gm)
- Eccentricity: 0.037379
- Orbital period (sidereal): 4.54 yr (1657.1 d)
- Average orbital speed: 17.99 km/s
- Mean anomaly: 348.975°
- Mean motion: 0° 13^{m} 2.078^{s} / day
- Inclination: 3.77868°
- Longitude of ascending node: 145.169°
- Argument of perihelion: 299.705°

Physical characteristics
- Dimensions: 113 km
- Mass: (7.6±1.8)×10^{17} kg (Note: Calculated from its standard gravitational parameter GM = 0.051±0.012 km^{3}/s^{2}.)
- Mean density: 1.01 g/cm^{3}
- Synodic rotation period: 11.122 h (0.4634 d)
- Geometric albedo: 0.055
- Temperature: unknown
- Spectral type: C
- Absolute magnitude (H): 8.68

206 Hersilia is a fairly large Main belt asteroid. It was discovered by C. H. F. Peters on October 13, 1879, in Clinton, New York. The asteroid was named after Hersilia, Roman wife of Romulus. It is classified as a primitive, dark carbon-rich C-type asteroid.

Measurements made with the IRAS observatory give a diameter of 101.72 ± 5.18 km and a geometric albedo of 0.06 ± 0.01. By comparison, the MIPS photometer on the Spitzer Space Telescope gives a diameter of 97.99 ± 7.40 km and a geometric albedo of 0.06 ± 0.02.

The last close earth transit was in November and December 2002.
