= 167 Urda =

Main-belt asteroid

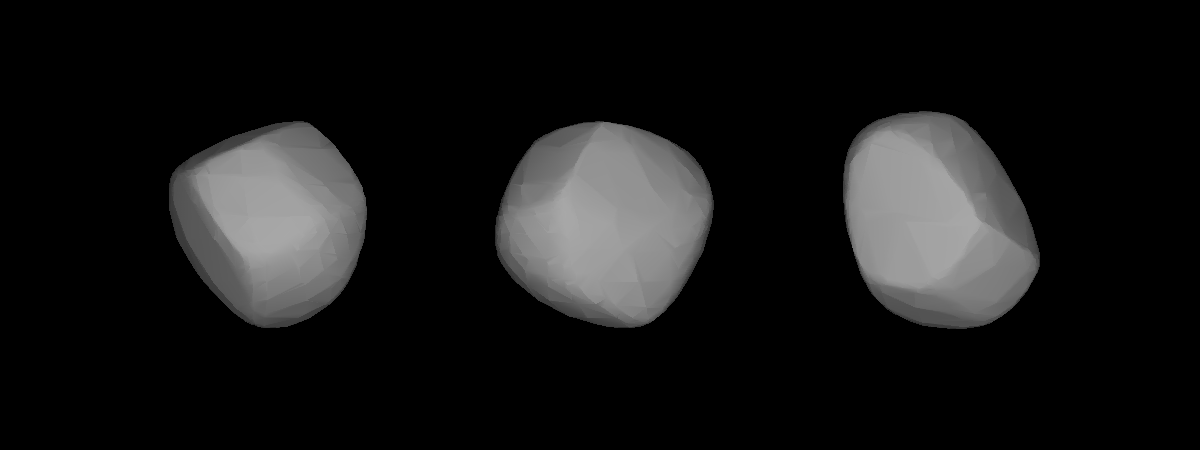
- A three-dimensional model of 167 Urda based on its lightcurve

Discovery
- Discovered by: C. H. F. Peters
- Discovery site: Clinton, New York
- Discovery date: 28 August 1876

Designations
- Pronunciation: /ˈɜːrdə/
- Named after: Urd
- Alternative designations: A876 QA; 1899 KC; 1905 QA; 1906 WA
- Minor planet category: main belt (Koronis asteroid family)

Orbital characteristics
- Epoch 31 July 2016 (JD 2457600.5)
- Uncertainty parameter 0
- Observation arc: 132.01 yr (48218 d)
- Aphelion: 2.9583526 AU (442.56325 Gm)
- Perihelion: 2.7493497 AU (411.29686 Gm)
- Semi-major axis: 2.8538511 AU (426.93005 Gm)
- Eccentricity: 0.0366177
- Orbital period (sidereal): 4.82 yr (1760.9 d)
- Mean anomaly: 37.607175°
- Mean motion: 0° 12^{m} 15.969^{s} / day
- Inclination: 2.212408°
- Longitude of ascending node: 166.21859°
- Argument of perihelion: 133.03586°
- Earth MOID: 1.73392 AU (259.391 Gm)
- Jupiter MOID: 2.10867 AU (315.453 Gm)
- T_{Jupiter}: 3.302

Physical characteristics
- Mean diameter: 44 ± 15 km 51 ± 15 (alternate)
- Synodic rotation period: 13.06133 h (0.544222 d)
- Pole ecliptic longitude: 249° 107° (alternate)
- Pole ecliptic latitude: −68° −69° (alternate)
- Geometric albedo: 0.2230±0.023
- Spectral type: S
- Absolute magnitude (H): 9.1

167 Urda is a main-belt asteroid that was discovered by German-American astronomer Christian Heinrich Friedrich Peters on August 28, 1876, in Clinton, New York, and named after Urd, one of the Norns in Norse mythology. In 1905, Austrian astronomer Johann Palisa showed that the asteroid varied in brightness.

Photometric observations of this asteroid at the Palmer Divide Observatory in Colorado Springs, Colorado, during 2007–8 gave a light curve with a period of 13.06133 ± 0.00002 hours. This S-type asteroid is a member of the Koronis family of asteroids that share similar orbital elements.

In 2002, a diameter estimate of 37.93 ± 3.17 km was obtained from the Midcourse Space Experiment observations, with an albedo of 0.2523 ± 0.0448.

A stellar occultation by Urda was observed from Japan on July 23, 2001.
