= 92 Undina =

Main-belt asteroid

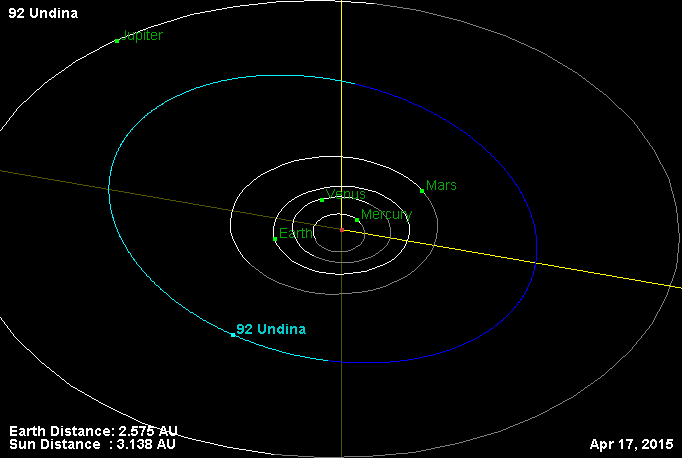

Discovery
- Discovered by: C. H. F. Peters
- Discovery site: Litchfield Obs.
- Discovery date: 7 July 1867

Designations
- Pronunciation: /ʌnˈdaɪnə/
- Minor planet category: Main belt
- Adjectives: Undinian /ʌnˈdɪniən/

Orbital characteristics
- Epoch 31 July 2016 (JD 2457600.5)
- Uncertainty parameter 0
- Observation arc: 145.11 yr (53001 d)
- Aphelion: 3.51946 AU (526.504 Gm)
- Perihelion: 2.85654 AU (427.332 Gm)
- Semi-major axis: 3.18800 AU (476.918 Gm)
- Eccentricity: 0.10397
- Orbital period (sidereal): 5.69 yr (2079.1 d)
- Mean anomaly: 6.12456°
- Mean motion: 0° 10^{m} 23.347^{s} / day
- Inclination: 9.92900°
- Longitude of ascending node: 101.588°
- Argument of perihelion: 239.494°

Physical characteristics
- Mean diameter: 123 ± 6 km (Note: Composite estimate.); 124.44 ± 3.25 km 126.42±3.4 km
- Mass: (4.43 ± 0.25) × 10^{18} kg (5.93±0.33)×10^{18} kg (Note: Calculated from its standard gravitational parameter GM = 0.396±0.022 km^{3}/s^{2}.)
- Mean density: 4.39 ± 0.42 g/cm^{3} 5.61 g/cm^{3} (Note: Assuming a diameter of 126 km.)
- Synodic rotation period: 15.941 h (0.6642 d)
- Geometric albedo: 0.26 ± 0.02; 0.2509±0.014; 0.251
- Spectral type: M
- Absolute magnitude (H): 6.61

92 Undina (from Latin Undīna) is a large main belt asteroid. The asteroid was discovered by Christian Peters on 7 July 1867 from the Hamilton College Observatory. It is named for the eponymous heroine of Undine, a popular novella by Friedrich de la Motte Fouqué.

This minor planet is orbiting at a distance of around 3 AU from the Sun, which is known for a concentration of Tholen M-type asteroids. Indeed, 92 Undina has an unusually high albedo of 0.25 and an M-type spectrum, or Xc-type on the Bus taxonomy. However, it displays absorption features at a wavelength of 3 μm, which is usually indicative of hydrated silicates on the surface. There is a faint band in the region of 9 μm that is typically attributed to a form of orthopyroxene having low levels of calcium and iron. The spectrum of 92 Undina closely resembles powdered material from the Esquel meteorite, although with a higher albedo.

Observations performed at the Palmer Divide Observatory in Colorado Springs, Colorado during 2007 produced a light curve with a period of 15.941 ± 0.002 hours with a brightness range of 0.20 ± 0.02 in magnitude. This matches a 15.94-hour period reported in 1979. Attempts in 2014 to model the spin axis and shape based on light curve information proved inconclusive, but did indicate that "the pole latitude is not far removed from the ecliptic plane and rotation is probably retrograde".
