= 199 Byblis =

Main-belt asteroid

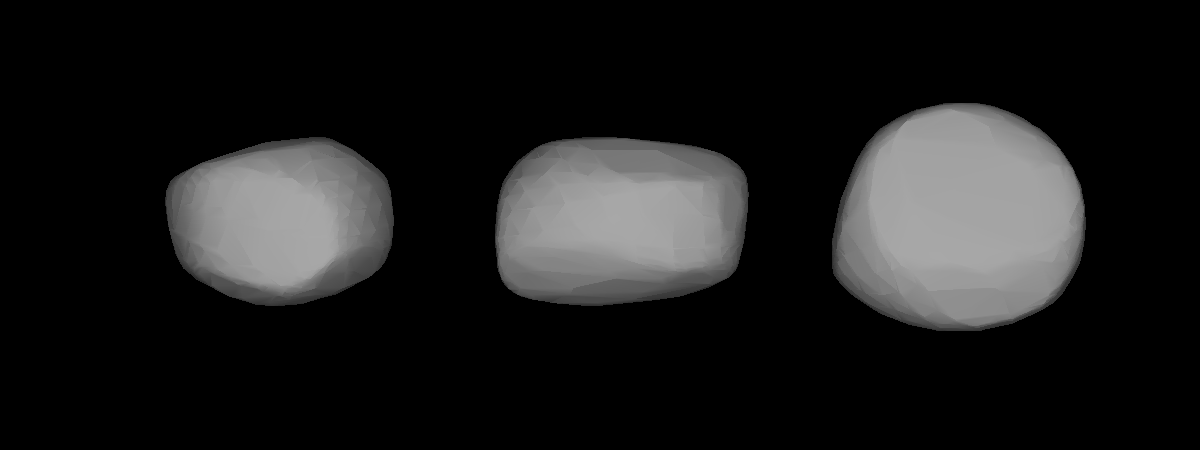
- A three-dimensional model of 199 Byblis based on its lightcurve

Discovery
- Discovered by: C. H. F. Peters, 1879
- Discovery date: 9 July 1879

Designations
- Pronunciation: /ˈbɪblɪs/
- Alternative designations: A879 NA; 1971 WB
- Minor planet category: Main belt
- Adjectives: Byblian /ˈbɪbliən/

Orbital characteristics
- Epoch 31 July 2016 (JD 2457600.5)
- Uncertainty parameter 0
- Observation arc: 136.39 yr (49817 d)
- Aphelion: 3.7367 AU (559.00 Gm)
- Perihelion: 2.5996 AU (388.89 Gm)
- Semi-major axis: 3.1682 AU (473.96 Gm)
- Eccentricity: 0.17946
- Orbital period (sidereal): 5.64 yr (2059.7 d)
- Mean anomaly: 86.623°
- Mean motion: 0° 10^{m} 29.208^{s} / day
- Inclination: 15.474°
- Longitude of ascending node: 88.589°
- Argument of perihelion: 180.18°
- Earth MOID: 1.58338 AU (236.870 Gm)
- Jupiter MOID: 1.372 AU (205.2 Gm)
- T_{Jupiter}: 3.122

Physical characteristics
- Mean radius: 38.06±0.30 km
- Synodic rotation period: 5.2201 h (0.21750 d)
- Geometric albedo: 0.11±0.01
- Absolute magnitude (H): 8.5

199 Byblis is a medium-sized main belt asteroid.

It was discovered by C. H. F. Peters on July 9, 1879, in Clinton, New York and named after Byblis, an incestuous lover in Greek mythology.
