= Chord (astronomy) =

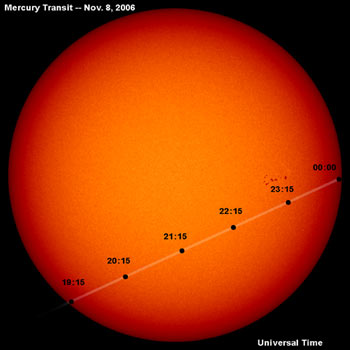
Transit of mercury chord across the sun

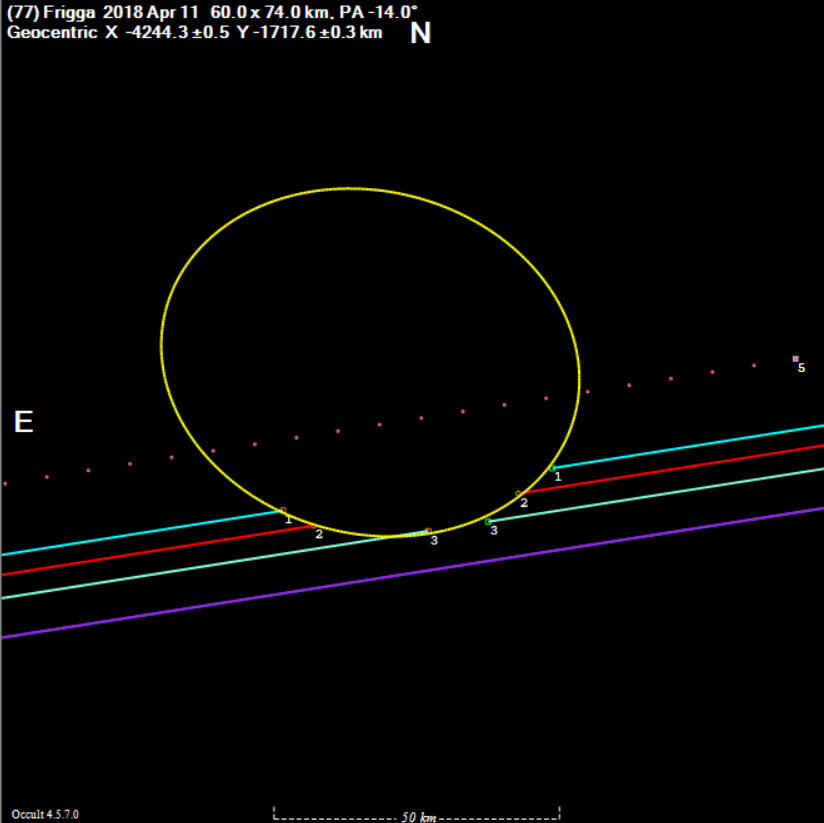
A three-chord occultation plot of the asteroid 77 Frigga, observed 2018 April 11th from eastern Australia.

In the field of astronomy the term chord typically refers to a line crossing an object which is traversed during an occultation event. By taking accurate measurements of the start and end times of the event, in conjunction with the known location of the observer and the object's orbit, the length of the chord can be determined giving an indication of the size of the occulting object. By combining observations made from several different locations, multiple chords crossing the occulting object can be determined giving a more accurate shape and size model. This technique of using multiple observers during the same event has been used to derive more sophisticated shape models for asteroids, whose shape can be highly irregular. A notable example of this occurred in 2002 when the asteroid 345 Tercidina underwent a stellar occultation of a very bright star as seen from Europe. During this event a team of at least 105 observers recorded 75 chords across the asteroid's surface allowing for a very accurate size and shape determination.

In addition to using a known orbit to determine an objects size, the reverse process can also be used. In this usage the occulting object's size is taken to be known and the occultation time can be used to determine the length of the chord the background object traced across the foreground object. Knowing this chord and the foreground object's size, a more precise orbit for the object can be determined.

This usage of the term "chord" is similar to the geometric concept (see: Chord (geometry)). The difference being that in the geometric sense a chord refers to a line segment whose ends lie on a circle, whereas in the astronomical sense the occulting shape is not necessarily circular.

== Observation process ==
Because an occultation event for an individual object is quite rare, the process of observing occultation events begins with the creation of a list of candidate targets. The list is generated from a computer by analyzing the orbital motions of a large collection of objects with known orbital parameters. Once a candidate event has been chosen whose ground track passes over the site of an observer, the preparations for the observation begin. A few minutes before the event is expected to happen the observing telescope is targeted to the target star and the star's lightcurve is recorded. The recording of the lightcurve continues during and for a short time after the predicted event. This extra recording time is due in part to uncertainties in the occulting objects orbit but also due to the possibility of detecting other objects orbiting the primary object (for example in the case of a binary asteroid, also the ring system around the planet Uranus was detected this way).

The exact method of lightcurve determination is dependent on the specific equipment available to the observer and the goals of the observation, however in all occultation events accurate timing is an essential component of the observation process. The exact time that the foreground object eclipses the other can be used to work out a very precise position along the occulting object's orbit. Also, since the duration of the drop in the measured lightcurve gives the object's size and since occultation events typically only last somewhere on the order of a few seconds, very fast integration times are required to allow for high temporal resolution along the lightcurve. A second method of achieving very high temporal accuracy is to actually use a long exposure and allow the target star to drift across the CCD during the exposure. This method, known as the trailed image method, produces a streak along the photograph whose thickness corresponds to the brightness of the target star with the distance along the streak direction indicates time; this allows for very high temporal accuracy even when the target star may be too dim for the method described above using high frequency short exposures. With high enough temporal resolution even the angular size of the background star can be determined.

Once the lightcurve has been recorded the chord across the occulting object can be determined via calculation. By using the start and end times of the occultation event the position in space of both the observer and the occulting object can be worked out (a process complicated by the fact that both the object and the observer are moving). Knowing these two locations, combined with the direction to the background object, the two endpoints of the chord can be determined using simple geometry.
