= Parallax (disambiguation) =

A parallax is the difference in the angular position of two stationary points relative to each other from different viewing positions.

Parallax may also refer to:

== Astronomy ==
- Dynamical parallax, a method of measuring the distance to a visual binary star
- Parsec (pc), parallax of one arcsecond with a baseline of 1 AU, equal to 3.26 light years.
- Photometric parallax method, a means to infer distances of stars
- Spectroscopic parallax, a method of measuring distances of stars
- Stellar parallax, uses actual geometric parallax to determine distance

== Business ==
- Parallax, Inc. (company), designer and manufacturer of microcontrollers
- Parallax Software, creator of the Descent series
- Parallax Studio, a film and animation studio based in the American Midwest
- Parallax Graphics, a defunct high-spec video card manufacturer

== Computer technology ==
- Parallax mapping, a 3D graphics rendering technique
- Parallax Propeller, a 32-bit microcontroller with eight CPU cores
- Parallax scrolling, a scrolling technique in computer graphics where the background content (for example, a background image of a website or app) is moved at a different speed than the foreground content while scrolling.

== People ==
- Samuel Rowbotham (1816–1884), who used the pseudonym "Parallax" when promoting his notion of a "flat Earth".

== Popular media ==
=== Print ===
- PARALLAX, a vampire novel by Jon F. Merz
- parallax (journal), an American academic journal on the topics for the disciplines of cultural studies, critical theory, and philosophy
- Parallax: And Selected Poems by Sinéad Morrissey

== Visual arts ==
- Parallax barrier
- Parallax mapping

=== Comics ===
- Parallax (character), a DC comic book supervillain

=== Film ===
- The Parallax View, a 1974 American thriller film starring Warren Beatty

=== Television ===
- Parallax (TV series), children's science-fiction series
- "Parallax" (Star Trek: Voyager), an episode of Star Trek: Voyager

=== Games ===
- Parallax (video game), a 1986 game for Commodore 64 by Sensible Software
- Parallax, a fictional organization from the video game 2064: Read Only Memories

== Recorded music ==
- Parallax (Greg Howe album), 1995 album by Greg Howe
- Parallax (Atlas Sound album), 2011 album by Atlas Sound
- The Parallax: Hypersleep Dialogues, 2011 EP by Between the Buried and Me
- The Parallax II: Future Sequence, 2012 album by Between the Buried and Me

== See also ==
- Motion parallax, a visual cue to depth based on relative motion
