= Extragalactic planet =

Planet that is outside the Milky Way galaxy

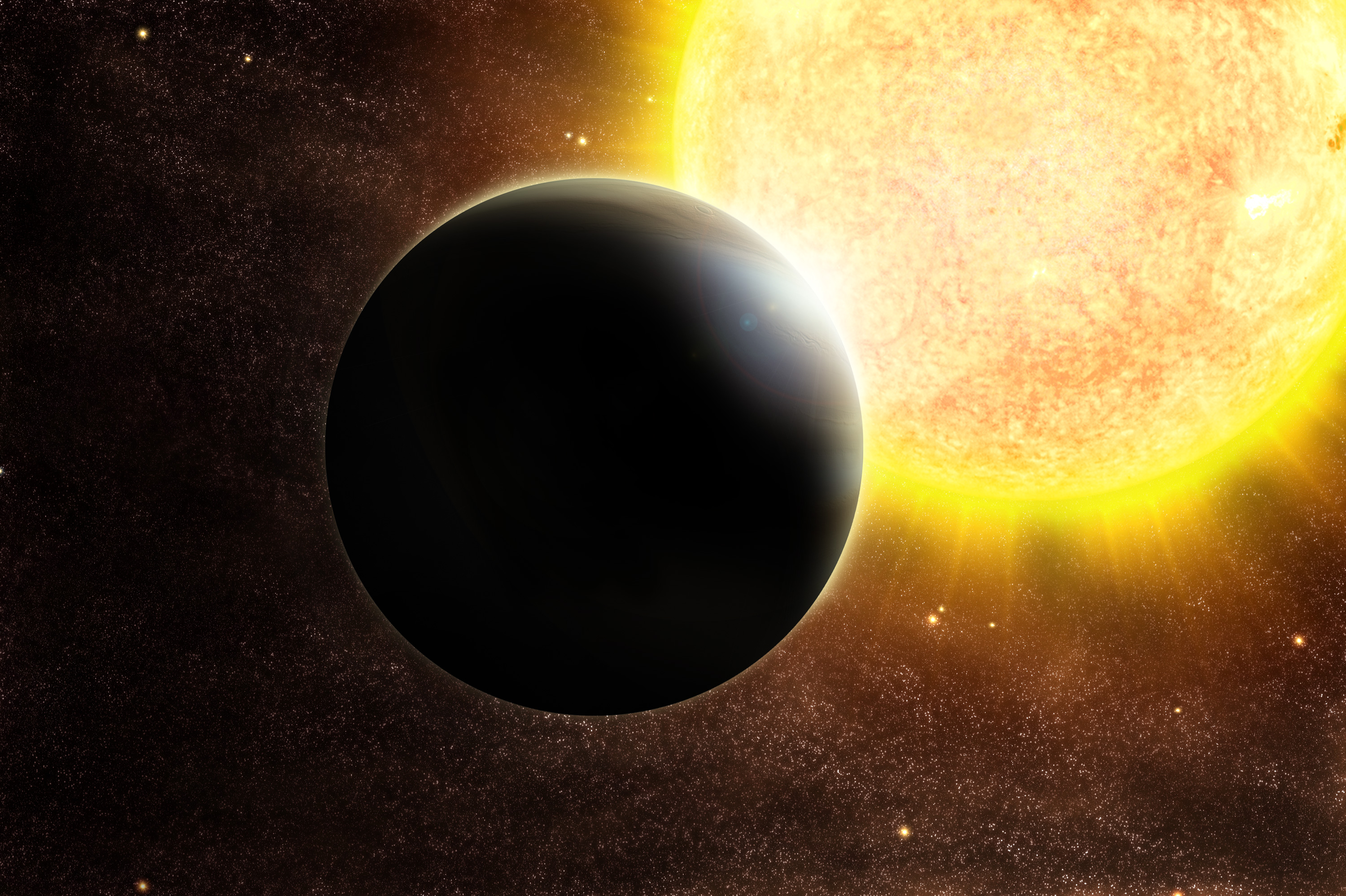
SWEEPS-04 (imaged, artist's impression) and SWEEPS-11 are not extragalactic but are currently the most distant exoplanets discovered

An extragalactic planet, also known as an extragalactic exoplanet or an extroplanet, is a star-bound planet or rogue planet located outside of the Milky Way Galaxy. Due to the immense distances to such worlds, they have been very hard to detect directly. However, indirect evidence suggests that such planets exist. Nonetheless, the most distant individually confirmed planets are SWEEPS-11 and SWEEPS-04, located in Sagittarius, approximately 27,710 light-years (8,500 parsecs) from the Sun, while the Milky Way is about 87,400 light-years (26,800 parsecs) in diameter. This means that even galactic planets located further than that distance have not been individually confirmed.

== Confirmed extragalactic planets ==
=== Confirmed from gravitational microlensing ===
A population of unbound planets between stars, with masses ranging from Lunar to Jovian masses, was indirectly detected, for the first time, by astrophysicists from the University of Oklahoma in 2018, in the lensing galaxy that lenses quasar RX J1131-1231 by microlensing. Later, two other similar populations were detected in the galaxies of the galaxy-quasar lensing systems Q J0158-4325 and SDSS J1004+4112, whose foreground members are 3.6 billion and 6.3 billion light-years away, respectively. These objects also could be a mix of low-mass rogue planets and primordial black holes.

== Candidate extragalactic planets ==
=== Candidates from gravitational microlensing ===
==== Einstein Cross-related planet ====
A microlensing event in the Einstein Cross-gravitational lensing system was observed in 1989 by M. J. Irwin and a team of researchers. They recorded a sharp brightness spike in the "A" image of the split background quasar, ruling out intrinsic quasar variability. Applying realistic galactic velocity models to the 420-day duration narrowed the lens mass down to approximately 1.6 M_{J}, making it the earliest mathematical candidate for an extragalactic planet. Later statistical macro-modeling in 2024 supported the presence of a population of similar free-floating, planetary-mass objects within the lens galaxy, known as Huchra's lens. This candidate planetary population is located roughly 400 million light-years away.

==== Twin Quasar-related planet ====
A microlensing event in the Twin Quasar gravitational lensing system was observed in 1996, by R. E. Schild, in the "A" lobe of the lensed quasar. It is predicted that a 3-Earth-mass planet in the lensing galaxy, YGKOW G1, caused the event. This was one of the first extragalactic planet candidates announced. This, however, is not a repeatable observation, as it was a one-time chance alignment. This predicted planet lies 4 billion light years away.

==== PA-99-N2 b ====
A team of scientists has used gravitational microlensing to come up with a tentative detection of an extragalactic exoplanet in Andromeda, the Milky Way's nearest large galactic neighbor. The lensing pattern fits a star with a smaller companion, PA-99-N2, weighing just around 6.34 times the mass of Jupiter. This suspected planet is the first announced in the Andromeda Galaxy.

=== Candidates from Fast radio burst periodicity ===
==== FRB 20180916B b ====
In 2022, a study proposed that a planet in a highly eccentric orbit with an orbital period of 16.25 days to explain the periodic bursts of FRB 20180916B, where a planet reaches periastron and interacts with the proposed magnetar, causing the periodic bursts. It has been proposed that this Fast radio burst-planet has a mass of around 2.87 M_{🜨}. If it is proven to be caused by an interacting planet and a magnetar, this would make it the most distant individually known planet, at a distance of around 486 million light-years away in the host spiral galaxy SDSS J015800.28+654253.0.

=== Candidates around extragalactic black-holes and X-ray binaries ===
==== IGR J12580+0134 ====
In 2016, a tidal disruption event was detected on the 9,150,000 M_{☉} supermassive black hole IGR J12580+0134, which was caused by the destruction of a 8–40 M_{J} object by the black hole. IGR J12580+0134 is 17 million parsecs (55 million light-years) away from Earth.

==== M51-ULS-1b ====
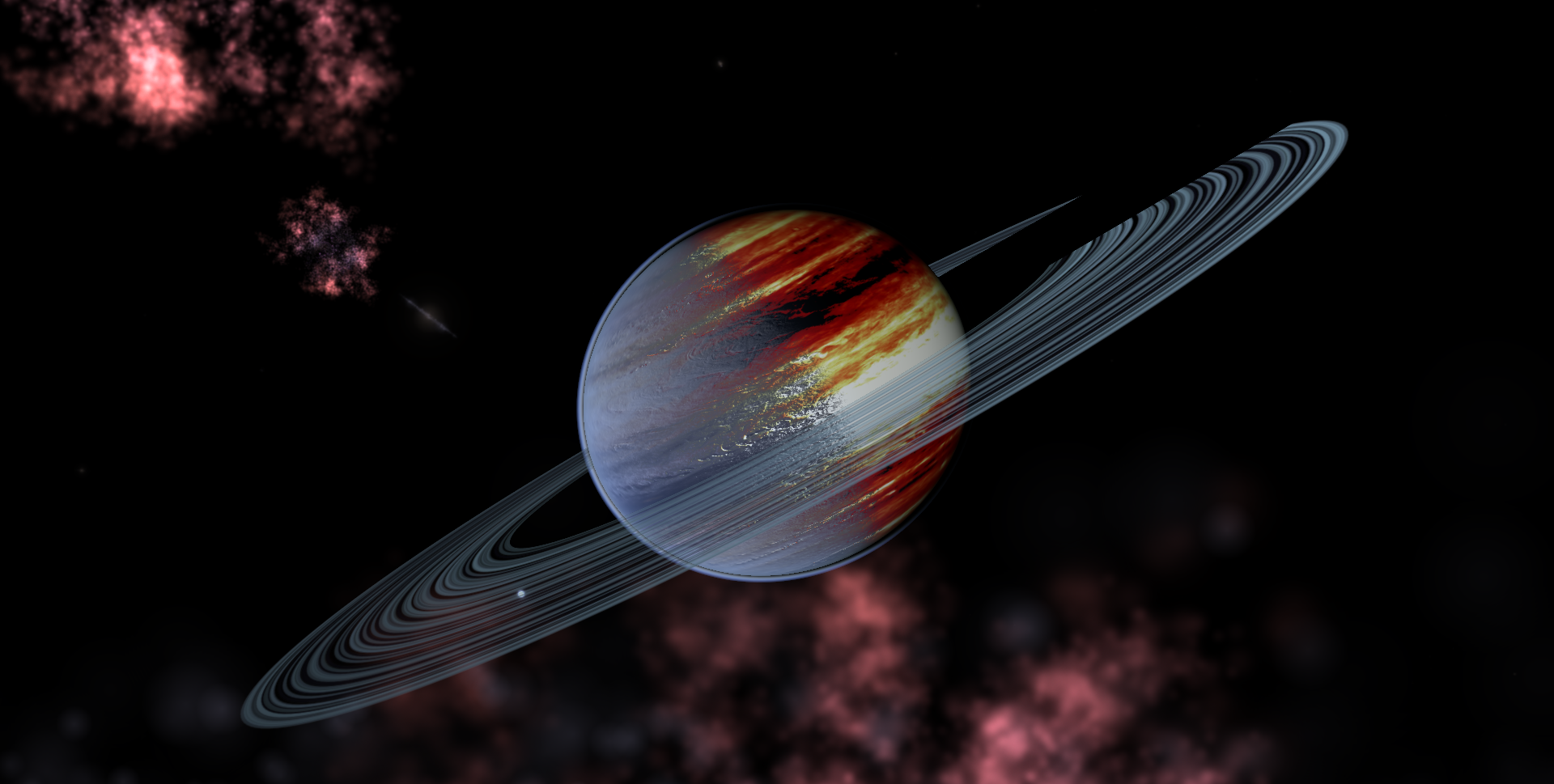
Artistic impression of M51-ULS-1 b in Celestia.

In September 2020, the detection of a candidate planet orbiting the high-mass X-ray binary M51-ULS-1 in the Whirlpool Galaxy was announced. The planet was detected by eclipses of the X-ray source, which consists of a stellar remnant (either a neutron star or a black hole) and a massive star, likely a B-type supergiant. The planet is 0.7 R_{J} or around 50,000 kilometers in radius and orbit at a distance of some tens of AU. The study of M51-ULS-1b as the first known extragalactic planet candidate was published in Nature in October 2021.

=== Candidates around formerly extragalactic stars ===
==== Disrupted planets of runaway stars ====
The subdwarf star HD 134440, which is currently located in galactic halo and has extragalactic origin, was found to have a significantly higher metallicity than the similar star HD 134439. In 2018, research by Henrique Reggiani and Jorge Melendez concluded that this may have resulted from an engulfment of orbiting planets by HD 134440.

==== BD+20 2457 b and BD+20 2457 c ====
The bright giant star BD+20 2457 was proposed to host two super-Jupiter planets or brown dwarfs, although the claimed planetary system is not dynamically stable. As BD+20 2457 is a halo star possibly having formed in the Gaia Enceladus, which are galactic remains of a former galaxy, the star and its planets might be extragalactic in origin.

== Refuted extragalactic planets ==
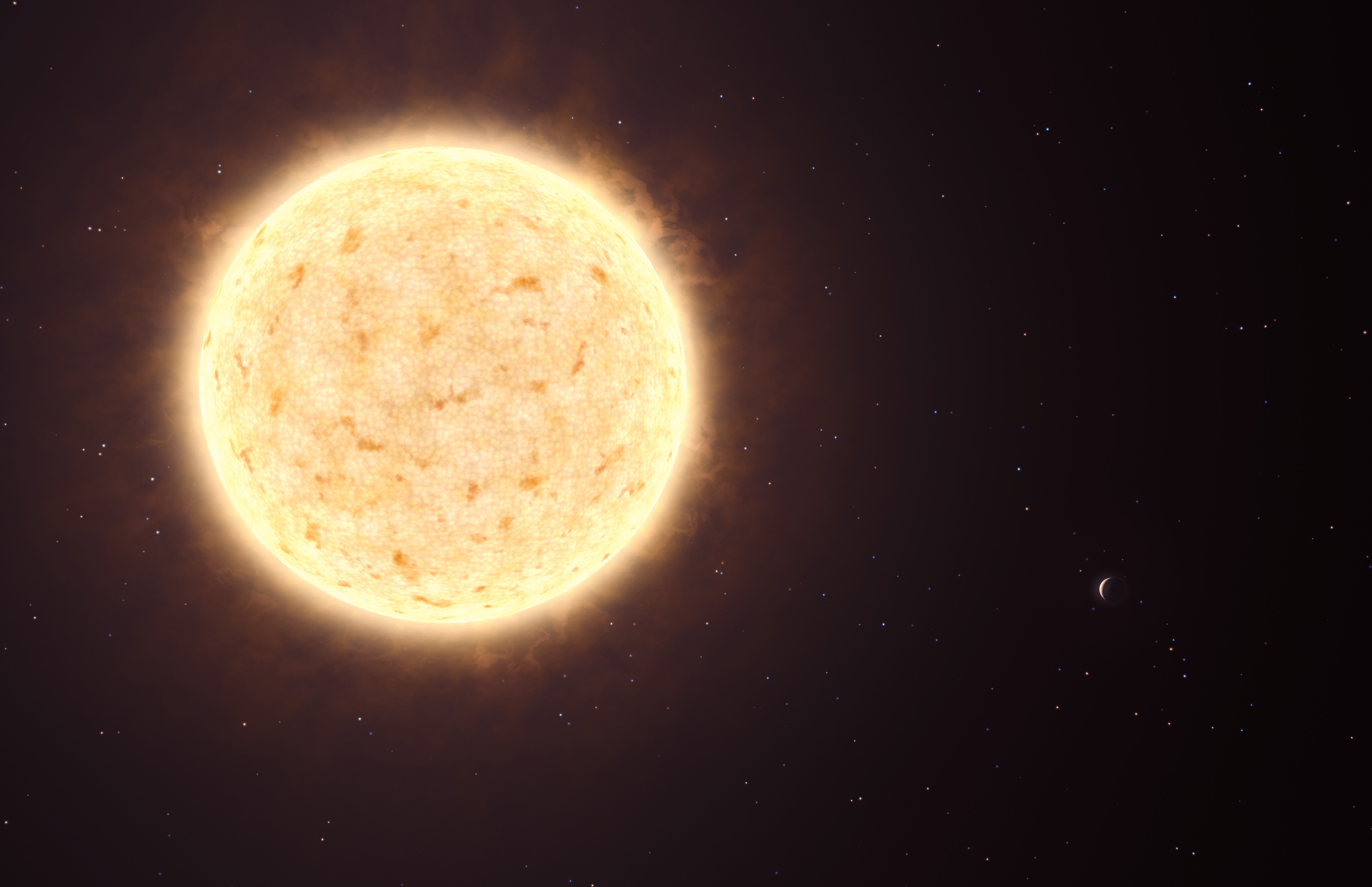
Artistic rendering of HIP 13044 and its planet, their origins may be extragalactic

=== HIP 13044 b ===
A planet with a mass of at least 1.25 times that of Jupiter had been potentially discovered by the European Southern Observatory (ESO) orbiting a star of extragalactic origin, even though the star currently has been absorbed by our own galaxy. HIP 13044 is a star about 2,000 light years away in the southern constellation of Fornax, part of the Helmi stream of stars, a leftover remnant of a small galaxy that collided with and was absorbed by the Milky Way over 6 billion years ago.

However, subsequent analysis of the data revealed problems with the potential planetary detection: for example an erroneous barycentric correction had been applied (the same error had also led to claims of planets around HIP 11952 that were subsequently refuted). After applying the corrections, there is no evidence for a planet orbiting the star. If it had been real, the Jupiter-like planet would have been particularly interesting, orbiting a star nearing the end of its life and seemingly about to be engulfed by it, potentially providing an observational model for the fate of our own planetary system in the distant future.

== See also ==
- Exoplanet – Planet outside of the Solar System
- Solar System planets
- Extragalactic astronomy – the study of any objects outside the Milky Way including the extragalactic planets
