= SWEEPS-10 =

Exoplanet

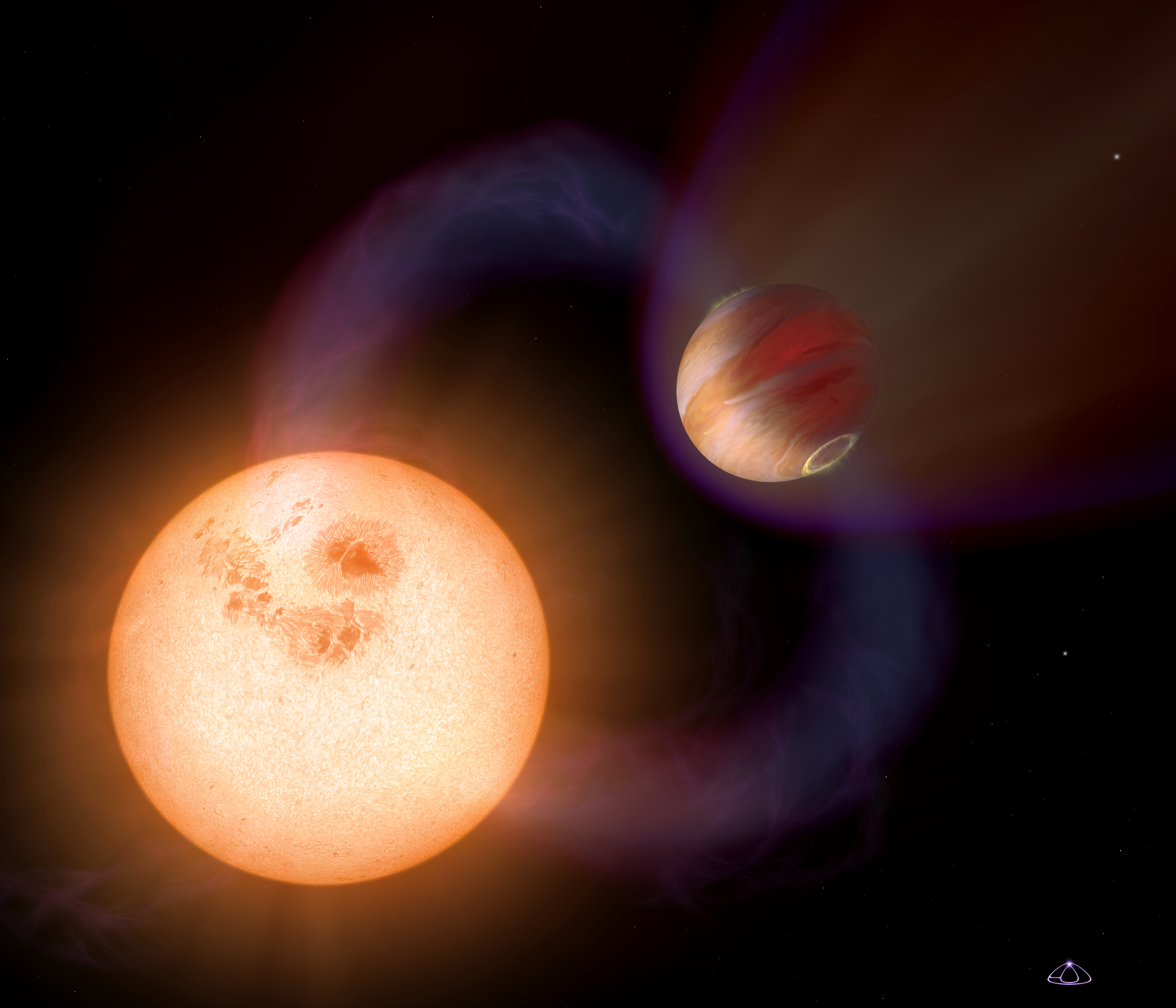
- Artist's impression of an ultra-short-period planet like SWEEPS-10

Discovery
- Discovered by: Jeremy McGovern
- Discovery date: October 4, 2006
- Detection method: Transit

Orbital characteristics
- Semi-major axis: 0.008 AU (1,200,000 km)
- Orbital period (sidereal): 0.424 d
- Inclination: >84

Physical characteristics
- Mean radius: 1.24±0.23 R_{J}
- Mass: >1.6 M_{J}

SWEEPS-10 is a candidate extrasolar planet that, from June 2007 to August 2011, was the planet candidate with the shortest orbital period yet found, until PSR J1719-1438 b was discovered in 2011 with an even shorter orbit. The planet orbits the star SWEEPS J175902.00−291323.7 located in the Galactic bulge at a distance of approximately 22,000 light years from Earth (based on a distance modulus of 14.1).

It completes an orbit of its star (designated SWEEPS J175902.00−291323.7) in just 10 hours, and is categorized as an ultra-short period planet (USPP). Located only 1.2 million kilometers from its star (roughly three times the distance between the Earth and the Moon), the planet is among the hottest ever detected; its estimated temperature is approximately 1,650 degrees Celsius. "This star-hugging planet must be at least 1.6 times the mass of Jupiter, otherwise the star's gravitational muscle would pull the planet apart," said team leader Kailash Sahu of the Space Telescope Science Institute in Baltimore, Maryland. Such USPPs seem to occur only around dwarf stars.

== Host star ==
SWEEPS J175902.00−291323.7
Observation data Epoch J2000 Equinox ICRS
- Constellation: Sagittarius
- Right ascension: 17^{h} 59^{m} 02.00^{s}
- Declination: −29° 13′ 23.7″
- Apparent magnitude (V): 26.23

Astrometry
Distance	22,000 ly (6,600 pc)

Details
Mass	0.44 M_{☉}
Radius	0.41 R_{☉}

Database references
SIMBAD	data

The small star's relatively low temperature allows the planet to exist. "USPPs occur preferentially around normal red dwarf stars that are smaller and cooler than our Sun," Sahu said.

== See also ==
- Sagittarius Window Eclipsing Extrasolar Planet Search (SWEEPS)
- SWEEPS-04
- SWEEPS-11
