= Blanet =

Planet that orbits a black hole

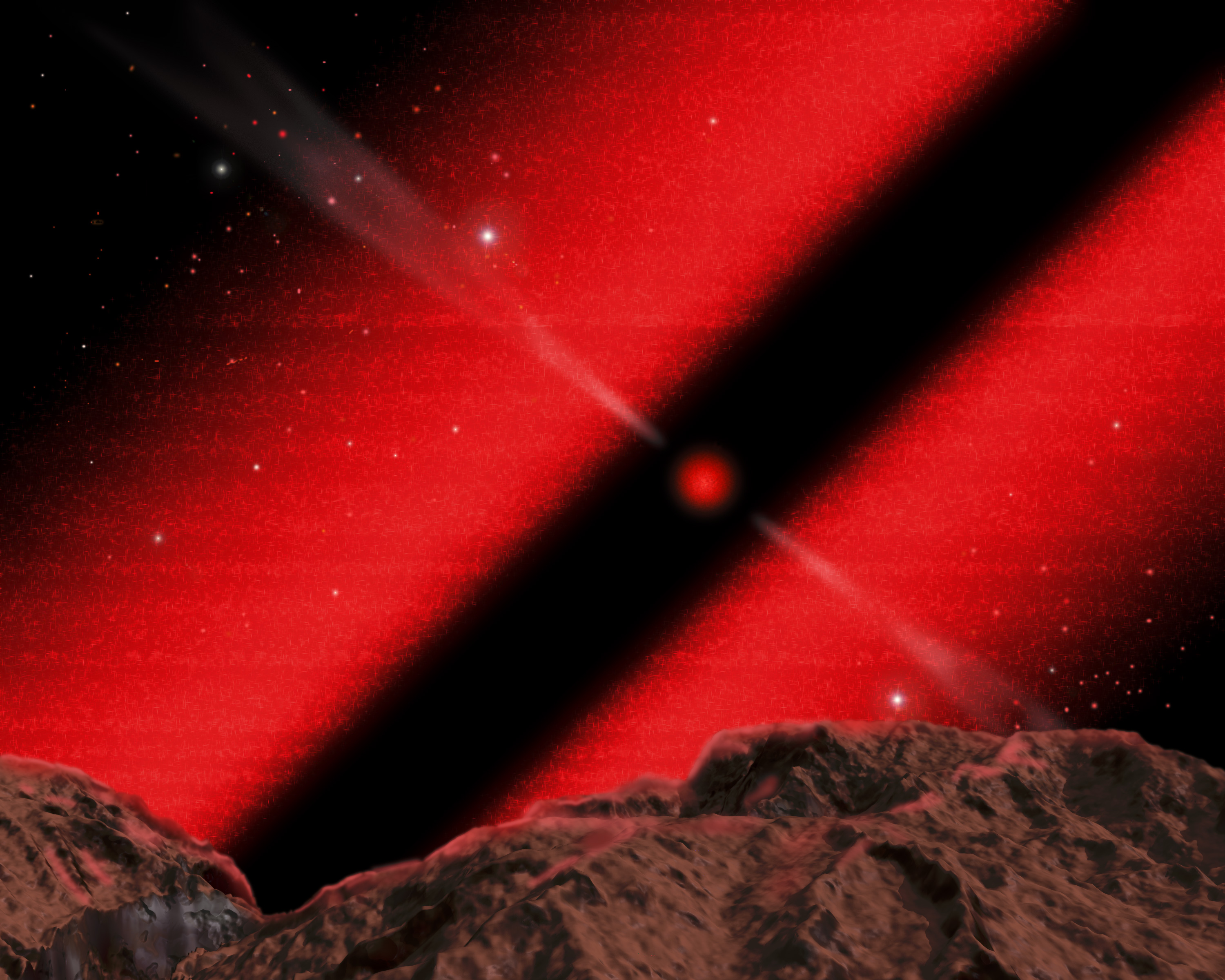
Artist's impression of the view of the sky from a planet orbiting inside the dust disk around the supermassive black hole in the center of the galaxy NGC 4261

A blanet is an exoplanet that directly orbits a black hole.

A study published in The Astrophysical Journal found that millions of Jupiter-mass planets could form around supermassive black holes. Furthermore, this new research shed light on the further growth of such massive planets via gas accretion from the active galactic nucleus (AGN) disk of a galaxy and their potential to become stars. The stars could then undergo a supernova explosion and form stellar-mass black holes. Such a population of micro black holes could help explain the heavy weight black hole mergers observed by LIGO.

Blanets are fundamentally similar to other planets; they have enough mass to be rounded by their own gravity, but are not massive enough to start thermonuclear fusion and become stars. In 2019, a team of astronomers and exoplanetologists showed that there is a safe zone around a supermassive black hole that could harbor thousands of blanets in orbit around it.

== Etymology ==
The team led by Keiichi Wada of Kagoshima University in Japan coined the term 'blanet' to refer to a planet orbiting a black hole. The word is a portmanteau of black hole and planet.

== Formation ==
Blanets are suspected to form in the accretion disk that orbits a sufficiently large black hole, provided the disk is relatively dim. Radiation feedback from the black hole could rotationally disrupt large dust grains in its accretion disk, causing them to break apart and preventing the formation of blanets.

== Properties ==
Blanets around supermassive black holes formed by the hole's accretion disk are likely to be at least 20 Earth masses and may have very long orbital periods to the order of hundreds of thousands of years. Despite their large mass relative to Earth, it would be difficult for blanets to gain a sufficient atmosphere in order to become gas giants due to Bondi accretion by the black hole.

Blanets may be heated by the black hole's accretion disk, or, if sufficiently close to the black hole, may be heated by blueshifted cosmic microwave background radiation.

Blanets sufficiently close to their host black hole may also be tidally locked or even tidally deformed.

== Candidates ==
- The unconfirmed extragalactic planet M51-ULS-1 b.
- The unconfirmed planet or brown dwarf, IGR J12580+0134 b, being disrupted by a supermassive black hole.

== In fiction ==
- The two-part episodes "The Impossible Planet" and "The Satan Pit" (2006) of the British television series Doctor Who take place on the titular “impossible planet”, a barren planet called Krop Tor orbiting a black hole called K37 Gem 5.
- In Interstellar (2014), two of the 3 terrestrial planets orbiting supermassive black hole Gargantua are proper blanets. The other one orbits a main-sequence star.
- In the Absolute Wonder Woman (2024-present) comic series, the place where Diana grew up in the Underworld, the Wild Isle, orbits a black hole.
