= HD 136164 =

Binary star system in the constellation Lupus

Observation data Epoch J2000 Equinox ICRS
- Constellation: Lupus
- Right ascension: 15^{h} 20^{m} 13.3930^{s}
- Declination: −34° 55′ 31.574″
- Apparent magnitude (V): +7.76±0.01

Characteristics
- Spectral type: A2V (A); M6-L2 (Ab)
- B−V color index: 0.175±0.015

Astrometry
Proper motion (μ)	RA: −22.631 mas/yr Dec.: −25.861 mas/yr
Parallax (π)	8.2024±0.0401 mas
Distance	398 ± 2 ly (121.9 ± 0.6 pc)
Absolute magnitude (M_{V})	+2.05

Position (relative to A)
Component	B
Angular distance	5.159±0.003″
Position angle	33.0±0.2°
Projected separation	650 AU

Orbit
Primary	A
Secondary	Ab
Period (P)	130 yr
Semi-major axis (a)	22.48+1.15 −1.03 au
Eccentricity (e)	0.44±0.03
Inclination (i)	11.5+4.6 −5.2°
Longitude of the node (Ω)	75+27 −25°
Periastron epoch (T)	2023.67+0.36 −0.21
Argument of periastron (ω) (secondary)	128+25 −30°

Details

A
Mass	1.87±0.07 M_{☉}
Radius	1.66+0.13 −0.15 R_{☉}
Luminosity	12.65 L_{☉}
Surface gravity (log g)	4.2 cgs
Temperature	8,100 K
Metallicity [Fe/H]	−0.07+0.11 −0.13 dex
Age	16±2 Myr

Ab
Mass	35±10 M_{Jup}
Radius	1.9 R_{Jup}
Luminosity	2.09+0.42 −0.23×10^{−3} L_{☉}
Surface gravity (log g)	4.35 cgs
Temperature	2,640 K
Metallicity [Fe/H]	+0.39 dex
Age	16±2 Myr

B
Mass	0.30 M_{☉}
Age	16±2 Myr

Other designations
- CD−34°10322, HD 136164, HIP 75056, TYC 7321-201-1

Database references
SIMBAD	data

HD 136164, also known as HIP 75056, is a binary star system in the constellation Lupus. At an apparent magnitude of +7.76, it is far too faint to be visible to the naked eye. Parallax measurements give a distance of 398 light-years (121.9 parsecs). The primary is orbited by a brown dwarf.

== Characteristics ==
This is a visual binary system whose components, as of 2015, are separated by 5.195" in the sky, translating to a projected separation of 650 astronomical units. The orbital period is estimated at 8,000 years. The system is 16 million years old and is part of the Upper–Centaurus–Lupus stellar association.

The primary component, HD 136164 A, has a spectrum matching a spectral class of A2V, with the luminosity class 'V' indicating it is a main sequence star fusing atoms of hydrogen into helium at its core. The star has 1.87 times the mass and 1.66 times the radius of the Sun. It radiates 12.65 times the Sun's luminosity from its photosphere at an effective temperature of 8,100 K. This temperature gives it the white hue typical of an A-type stars.

The secondary has a mass of 0.30 M_{☉}.

== Substellar companion ==
The primary star is orbited by a brown dwarf named HD 136164 Ab or HIP 75056 Ab. It was first discovered in 2020 through direct imaging. The companion orbits at a semi-major axis of 22.5 astronomical units, has a mild eccentricity, and takes roughly 130 years to circle the host star. Relative to Earth, the orbit is nearly face-on, with an inclination less than 35°.

Based on observations of the brown dwarf's orbit using both relative and absolute astrometry, its mass is measured at 35±10 Jupiter masses. Comparing its spectrum to atmospheric models retrieve a radius of 1.9 R_{J} and an effective temperature of 2,640 K. The luminosity is estimated at 10^{−2.68+0.08
−0.05} L_{☉} from evolutionary models. The carbon-to-oxygen abundance ratio and relatively high eccentricity of the orbit suggest that the companion formed like a failed star, either via fragmentation of the circumstellar disk or via fragmentation of a molecular cloud.
