= Light curve =

Graph of light intensity of a celestial object or region, as a function of time

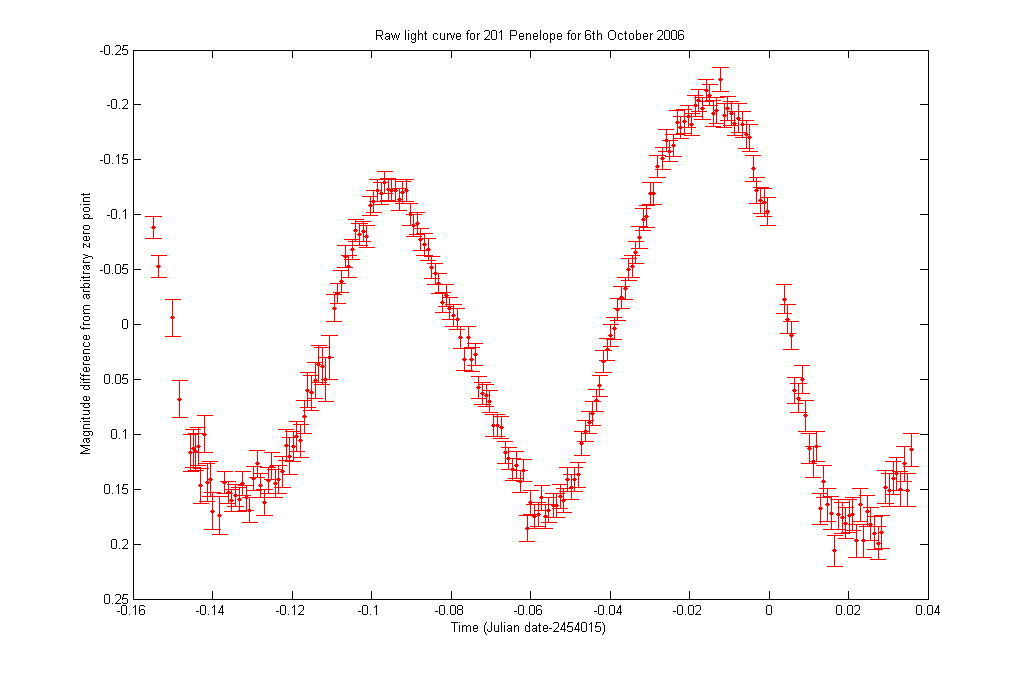
Light curve of the asteroid 201 Penelope based on images taken on 6 October 2006 at Mount John University Observatory. Shows just over one full rotation, which lasts 3.7474 hours.

In astronomy, a light curve is a graph of the light intensity of a celestial object or region as a function of time, typically with the magnitude of light received on the y-axis and with time on the x-axis. The light is usually in a particular frequency interval or band.

Light curves can be periodic, as in the case of eclipsing binaries, Cepheid variables, other periodic variables, and transiting extrasolar planets; or aperiodic, like the light curve of a nova, cataclysmic variable star, supernova, microlensing event, or binary as observed during occultation events. The study of a light curve and other observations can yield considerable information about the physical process that produces such a light curve, or constrain the physical theories about it.

== Variable stars ==
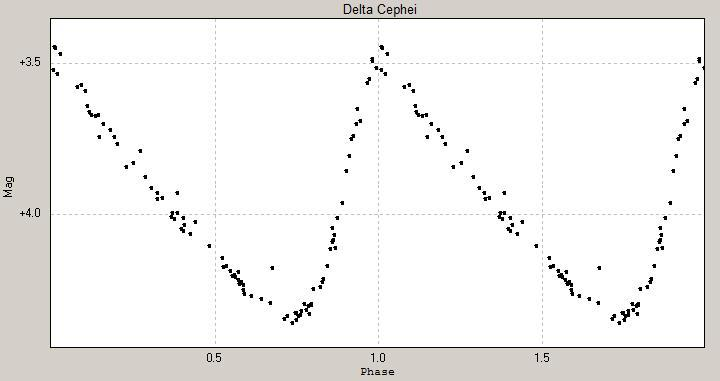
Light curve of δ Cephei showing magnitude versus pulsation phase

Graphs of the apparent magnitude of a variable star over time are commonly used to visualise and analyse their behaviour. Although the categorisation of variable star types is increasingly done from their spectral properties, the amplitudes, periods, and regularity of their brightness changes are still important factors. Some types such as Cepheids have extremely regular light curves with exactly the same period, amplitude, and shape in each cycle. Others such as Mira variables have somewhat less regular light curves with large amplitudes of several magnitudes, while the semiregular variables are less regular still and have smaller amplitudes.

The shapes of variable star light curves give valuable information about the underlying physical processes producing the brightness changes. For eclipsing variables, the shape of the light curve indicates the degree of totality, the relative sizes of the stars, and their relative surface brightnesses. It may also show the eccentricity of the orbit and distortions in the shape of the two stars. For pulsating stars, the amplitude or period of the pulsations can be related to the luminosity of the star, and the light curve shape can be an indicator of the pulsation mode.

=== Supernovae ===
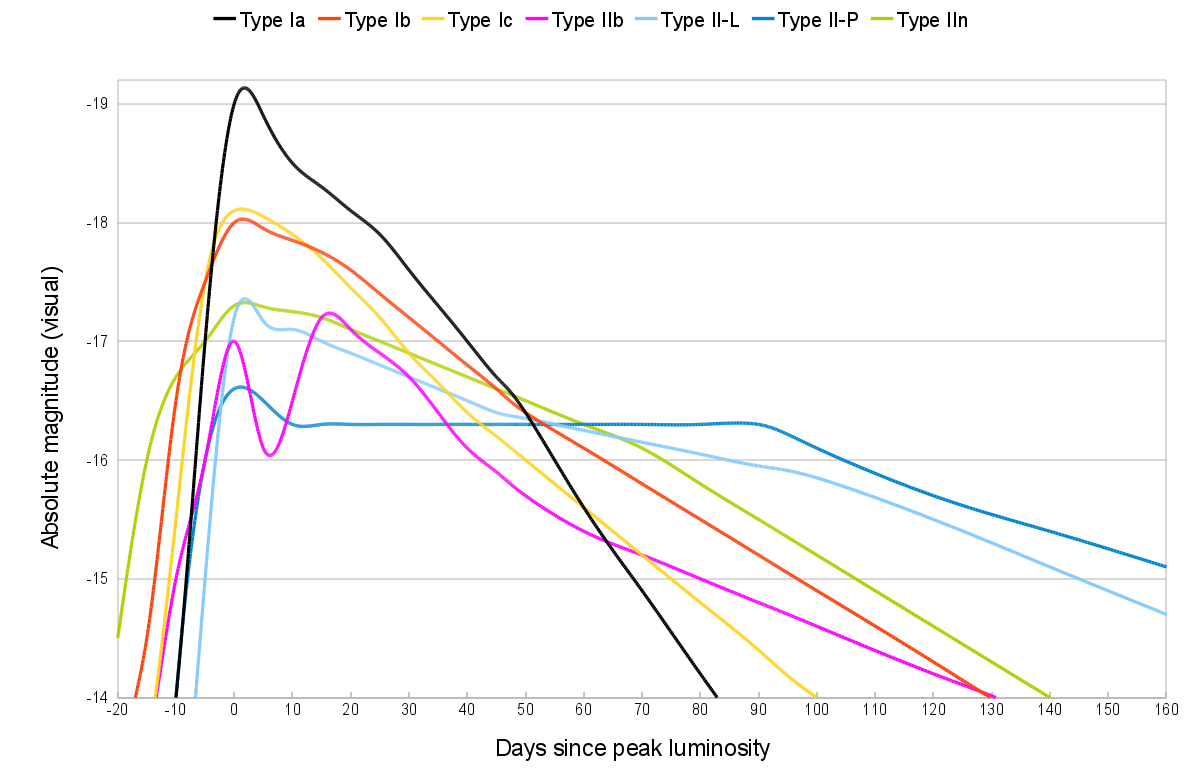
Comparative supernova type light curves

Light curves from supernovae can be indicative of the type of supernova. Although supernova types are defined on the basis of their spectra, each has typical light curve shapes. Type I supernovae have light curves with a sharp maximum and gradually decline, while Type II supernovae have less sharp maxima. Light curves are helpful for classification of faint supernovae and for the determination of sub-types. For example, the type II-P (for plateau) have similar spectra to the type II-L (linear) but are distinguished by a light curve where the decline flattens out for several weeks or months before resuming its fade.

== Planetary astronomy ==
In planetary science, a light curve can be used to derive the rotation period of a minor planet, moon, or comet nucleus. From the Earth there is often no way to resolve a small object in the Solar System, even in the most powerful of telescopes, since the apparent angular size of the object is smaller than one pixel in the detector. Thus, astronomers measure the amount of light produced by an object as a function of time (the light curve). The time separation of peaks in the light curve gives an estimate of the rotational period of the object. The difference between the maximum and minimum brightnesses (the amplitude of the light curve) can be due to the shape of the object, or to bright and dark areas on its surface. For example, an asymmetrical asteroid's light curve generally has more pronounced peaks, while a more spherical object's light curve will be flatter. This allows astronomers to infer information about the shape and spin (but not size) of asteroids.

=== Asteroid lightcurve database ===
==== Lightcurve quality code ====
The Asteroid Lightcurve Database (LCDB) of the Collaborative Asteroid Lightcurve Link (CALL) uses a numeric code to assess the quality of a period solution for minor planet light curves (it does not necessarily assess the actual underlying data). Its quality code parameter U ranges from 0 (incorrect) to 3 (well-defined):

- U = 0 → Result later proven incorrect
- U = 1 → Result based on fragmentary light curve(s), may be completely wrong.
- U = 2 → Result based on less than full coverage. Period may be wrong by 30 percent or ambiguous.
- U = 3 → Secure result within the precision given. No ambiguity.
- U = n.a. → Not available. Incomplete or inconclusive result.

A trailing plus sign (+) or minus sign (−) is also used to indicate a slightly better or worse quality than the unsigned value.

=== Occultation light curves ===
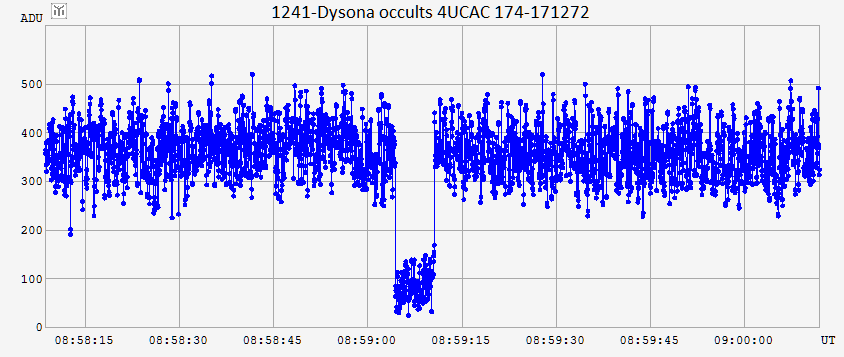
Light curve of the asteroid 1241 Dysona occulting 4UCAC 174-171272, showing instantaneous disappearance and reappearance. Duration is 6.48 seconds.

The occultation light curve is often characterised as binary, where the light from the star is terminated instantaneously, remains constant for the duration, and is reinstated instantaneously. The duration is equivalent to the length of a chord across the occulting body.

Circumstances where the transitions are not instantaneous are;

- when either the occulting or occulted body are double, e.g. a double star or double asteroid, then a step light curve is observed.
- when the occulted body is large, e.g. a star like Antares, then the transitions are gradual.
- when the occulting body has an atmosphere, e.g. the moon Titan

The observations are typically recorded using video equipment and the disappearance and reappearance timed using a GPS disciplined Video Time Inserter (VTI).

Occultation light curves are archived at the VizieR service.

== Exoplanet discovery ==
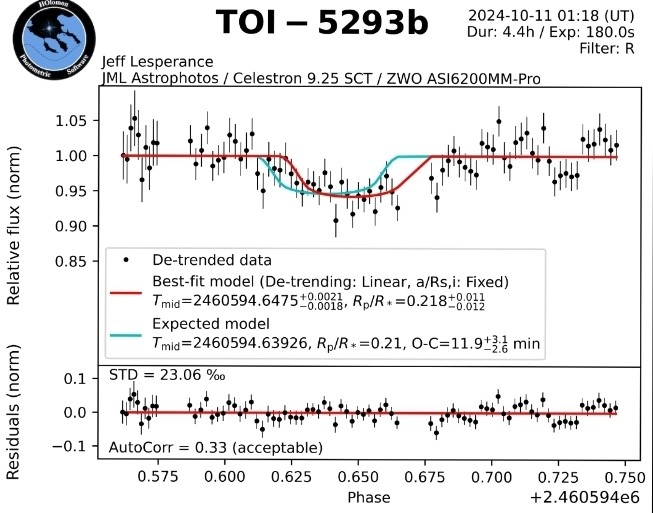
Light curve of exoplanet TOI-5293Ab taken through a red filter and an amateur telescope. Credit: Jeff Lesperance

Periodic dips in a star's light curve graph could be due to an exoplanet passing in front of the star that it is orbiting. When an exoplanet passes in front of its star, light from that star is temporarily blocked, resulting in a dip in the star's light curve. These dips are periodic, as planets periodically orbit a star. Many exoplanets have been discovered via this method, which is known as the astronomical transit method.

== Light-curve inversion ==
Light-curve inversion of asteroid (319) Leona.

Light-curve inversion is a mathematical technique used to model the surfaces of rotating objects from their brightness variations. This can be used to effectively image starspots or asteroid surface albedos.

== Microlensing ==
Microlensing is a process where relatively small and low-mass astronomical objects cause a brief small increase in the brightness of a more distant object. This is caused by the small relativistic effect as larger gravitational lenses, but allows the detection and analysis of otherwise-invisible stellar and planetary mass objects. The properties of these objects can be inferred from the shape of the lensing light curve. For example, PA-99-N2 is a microlensing event that may have been due to a star in the Andromeda Galaxy that has an exoplanet.
