= M51-ULS-1 =

X-ray binary in the Whirlpool Galaxy

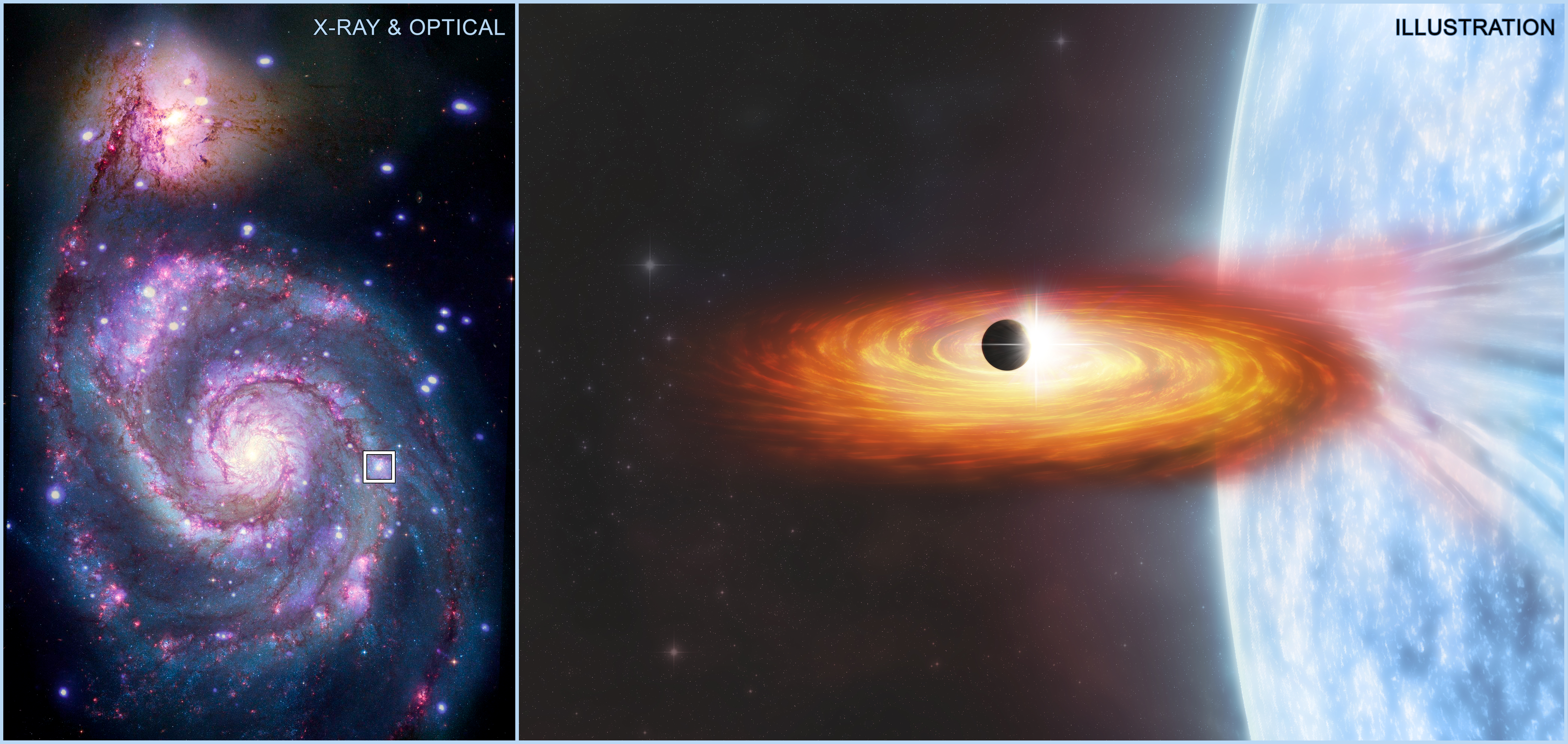
- Location and artist depiction of M51-ULS-1

Observation data Epoch J2000.0 Equinox ICRS
- Constellation: Canes Venatici
- Right ascension: 13^{h} 29^{m} 43.31^{s}
- Declination: +47° 11′ 34.8″
Apparent magnitude (V)	24.01	

Characteristics

A
- Evolutionary stage: Blue supergiant
- Spectral type: B2-8la

B
- Evolutionary stage: Black hole or neutron star

Astrometry
Distance	28 million ly

Orbit
Primary	M51-ULS-1 A
Name	M51-ULS-1 B
Semi-major axis (a)	50 R_{☉} (<3 AU)

Details

A
Mass	20 M_{☉}
Radius	<25 R_{☉}
Luminosity	260,010 L_{☉}
Temperature	26,068 K
Age	4-16 Myr

B
Mass	1.4-10 M_{☉}
Radius	10 (Note: Assumed radius if the secondary object is a neutron star)-30 (Note: Schwarzschild radius if the secondary object is a black hole) km
Age	4-16 Myr

Other designations
- RX J132943+47115, IXO 79, CXOU J132943.3+471135

Database references
SIMBAD	data

M51-ULS-1, also known as RX J132943+47115, is a high-mass X-ray binary (HMXB) system in the constellation of Canes Venatici. The binary system is located in the Whirlpool Galaxy, a nearby spiral galaxy some 28 million light years (or 8.6 million parsecs) away. The binary system has an apparent visual magnitude of 24.01. The binary system was discovered in 1995 in a ROSAT survey of X-ray sources in the Whirlpool Galaxy and NGC 5195.

== Characteristics ==
M51-ULS-1 is a high-mass X-ray binary system in the Whirlpool Galaxy consisting of two components, a blue supergiant, and a compact object. The binary system has a predicted age between 4 and 16 million years old; it was also found that the system is probably no older than 100 million years old. The compact object orbits the more massive blue supergiant star in an orbit with a semi-major axis of 50 R_{☉}, and it was found that the semi-major axis of the binary is no larger than 3 astronomical units.

The primary star, M51-ULS-1 A, is a massive, luminous early to late blue supergiant star. The primary star has a spectral type of B2-8la discovered using Hubble Space Telescope photometry. The primary star has a mass of about 20 M_{☉}. Because of the star's mass it is predicted that the primary star might undergo a hydrogen-poor supernovae in the future. The primary star has an estimated size of <25 R_{☉}, based on a luminosity of ~260,000 L_{☉} (Note: 10^{39} erg/s = 260,010.4004 L_{☉}) and a derived effective temperature of approximately 26,000 K. (Note: Applying the Stefan–Boltzmann law with a nominal solar effective temperature of 5,772 K: $$\sqrt{\biggl(\frac{5,772}{26,068}\biggr)^4 \cdot {260,010}} = 25\ R_\odot$$.)

The secondary object, M51-ULS-1 B, is a stellar remnant and is either a black hole or neutron star. If the secondary object is a black hole, it would have a mass of 10 M_{☉}, classifying the secondary object as a stellar-mass black hole; using its mass, it would have a Schwarzschild radius of roughly 30 kilometers. If the secondary object is a neutron star, it would have mass of 1.4 M_{☉}. It is known that the secondary object is accreting 10^{−6} M_{☉} worth of material every year from the primary star.

== Planetary system ==
Representation of orbit of M51-ULS-1 b

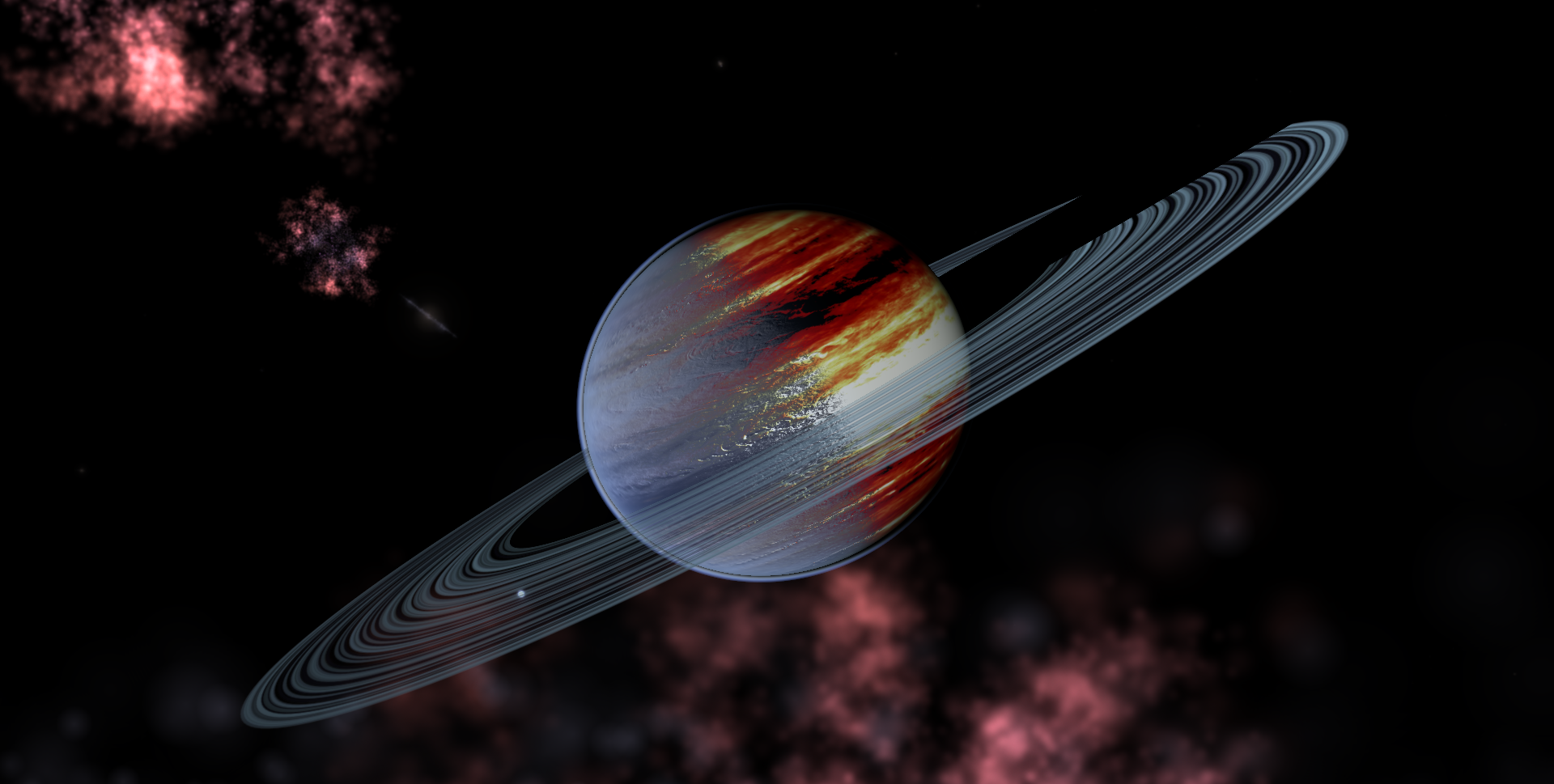
Artistic impression of M51-ULS-1 b in Celestia

In September 2020, a candidate exoplanet named M51-ULS-1 b was discovered in the system using the Chandra X-ray Observatory. The putative exoplanet is mainly notable for being the first extragalactic planet candidate with strong evidence. The potential exoplanet was detected by the eclipses of the X-ray source (XRS); i. e. M51-ULS-1 B, the compact object orbiting the primary star. The candidate exoplanet is likely slightly smaller than the planet Saturn. The unconfirmed exoplanet orbits both of the objects in the system in about 70 years, and has a semi-major axis of 45 AU. It was suggested that the planet could be a white dwarf, however this was ruled out because of the fact it would cause a lensing event and not a dip in flux. It was also proposed that it may be a cloud of gas, however the discoverers found this as an unlikely explanation. Due to M51-ULS-1 b orbiting a potential black hole it may be classified as a blanet.

The M51-ULS-1 planetary system
Companion (in order from star)	Mass	Semimajor axis (AU)	Orbital period (years)	Eccentricity	Inclination (°)	Radius
b (unconfirmed)	—	45	70	—	—	0.7 R_{J}

== See also ==
- PA-99-N2, another system containing a potential extragalactic planet.
- M33 X-7, another extragalactic high-mass X-ray binary.
- Extragalactic planet
- Circumbinary planet
- Whirlpool Galaxy
