= Photometric parallax =

Astronomy technique

Photometric parallax is a means to infer the distances of stars using their colours and apparent brightnesses. It was used by the Sloan Digital Sky Survey to discover the Virgo super star cluster.

Assuming that a star is on the main sequence, the star's absolute magnitude can be determined based on its color. Once the absolute and apparent magnitudes are known, the distance to the star can be determined by using the distance modulus. It does not actually employ any measurements of parallax and can be considered a misnomer.

Unlike the stellar parallax method, the photometric parallax method can be used to estimate the distances of stars over 10 kpc away, at the expense of much more limited accuracy for individual measurements.

== See also ==
- Parallax in astronomy
- Spectroscopic parallax
- Dynamical parallax
