= Parallax in astronomy =

Distance measuring technique

Stellar parallax motion from annual parallax. Half the apex angle is the parallax angle.

The blue dots (left) represent the observer. By drawing a line straight out to the star (right) from different positions and measuring the angle formed between the two (α), astronomers can measure the distance between the Earth and the star.

In astronomy, parallax is the apparent shift in position of a nearby celestial object relative to distant background objects which is caused by a change in the observer's point of view. This effect is most commonly used to measure the distance to nearby stars from two different positions in Earth's orbital cycle, usually six months apart. By measuring the parallax angle, the measure of change in a star's position from one point of measurement to another, astronomers can use trigonometry to calculate how far away the star is.

The concept hinges on the geometry of a triangle formed between the Earth at two different points in its orbit at one end and a star at the other. The parallax angle is half the angle (α) formed at the star between those two lines of sight. The closer the star is to the observer, the larger the angle would be.

Parallax is a foundational method in the cosmic distance ladder, a series of techniques astronomers use to measure distances in the universe. While parallax is only effective at measuring distances of nearby stars, space telescopes like Gaia have significantly expanded its effectiveness. Parallax remains the most direct and reliable method for measuring stellar distances, forming the basis for calibrating more indirect methods to measure distances to galaxies and beyond.

== Parsec ==
The parsec (symbol: pc) is a unit of length used to measure the large distances to astronomical objects outside the Solar System, approximately equal to 3.26 light-years or 206,265 astronomical units (au), i.e., 30.9 trillion kilometres (19.2 trillion miles). (Note: One trillion here is short scale, ie. 10^{12} (one million million, or billion in long scale).) The parsec unit is obtained by the use of parallax and trigonometry, and is defined as the distance at which 1 au subtends an angle of one arcsecond (1/3600 of a degree). The nearest star, Proxima Centauri, is about 1.3 parsecs (4.2 light-years) from the Sun: from that distance, the gap between the Earth and the Sun spans slightly less than one arcsecond. Most stars visible to the naked eye are within a few hundred parsecs of the Sun, with the most distant at a few thousand parsecs, and the Andromeda Galaxy at over 700,000 parsecs.

The word parsec is a shortened form of a distance corresponding to a parallax of one arcsecond, coined by the British astronomer Herbert Hall Turner in 1913. The unit was introduced to simplify the calculation of astronomical distances from raw observational data. Partly for this reason, it is the unit preferred in astronomy and astrophysics, though in popular science texts and common usage the light-year remains prominent. Although parsecs are used for the shorter distances within the Milky Way, multiples of parsecs are required for the larger scales in the universe, including kiloparsecs (kpc) for the more distant objects within and around the Milky Way, megaparsecs (Mpc) for mid-distance galaxies, and gigaparsecs (Gpc) for many quasars and the most distant galaxies.

In August 2015, the International Astronomical Union (IAU) passed Resolution B2 which, as part of the definition of a standardized absolute and apparent bolometric magnitude scale, mentioned an existing explicit definition of the parsec as exactly 648000/π au, or approximately 30856775814913673 metres, given the IAU 2012 exact definition of the astronomical unit in metres. This corresponds to the small-angle definition of the parsec found in many astronomical references.

== Stellar parallax ==
Stellar parallax motion

Stellar parallax created by the relative motion between the Earth and a star can be seen, in the Copernican model, as arising from the orbit of the Earth around the Sun: the star only appears to move relative to more distant objects in the sky. In a geostatic model, the movement of the star would have to be taken as real with the star oscillating across the sky with respect to the background stars.

Stellar parallax is most often measured using annual parallax, defined as the difference in position of a star as seen from the Earth and Sun, i.e. the angle subtended at a star by the mean radius of the Earth's orbit around the Sun. The parsec (3.26 light-years) is defined as the distance for which the annual parallax is 1 arcsecond. Annual parallax is normally measured by observing the position of a star at different times of the year as the Earth moves through its orbit. Measurement of annual parallax was the first reliable way to determine the distances to the closest stars. The first successful measurements of stellar parallax were made by Friedrich Bessel in 1838 for the star 61 Cygni using a heliometer. Stellar parallax remains the standard for calibrating other measurement methods. Accurate calculations of distance based on stellar parallax require a measurement of the distance from the Earth to the Sun, now based on radar reflection off the surfaces of planets.

The angles involved in these calculations are very small and thus difficult to measure. The nearest star to the Sun (and thus the star with the largest parallax), Proxima Centauri, has a parallax of 0.7687 ± 0.0003 arcsec. This angle is approximately that subtended by an object 2 centimeters in diameter located 5.3 kilometers away.

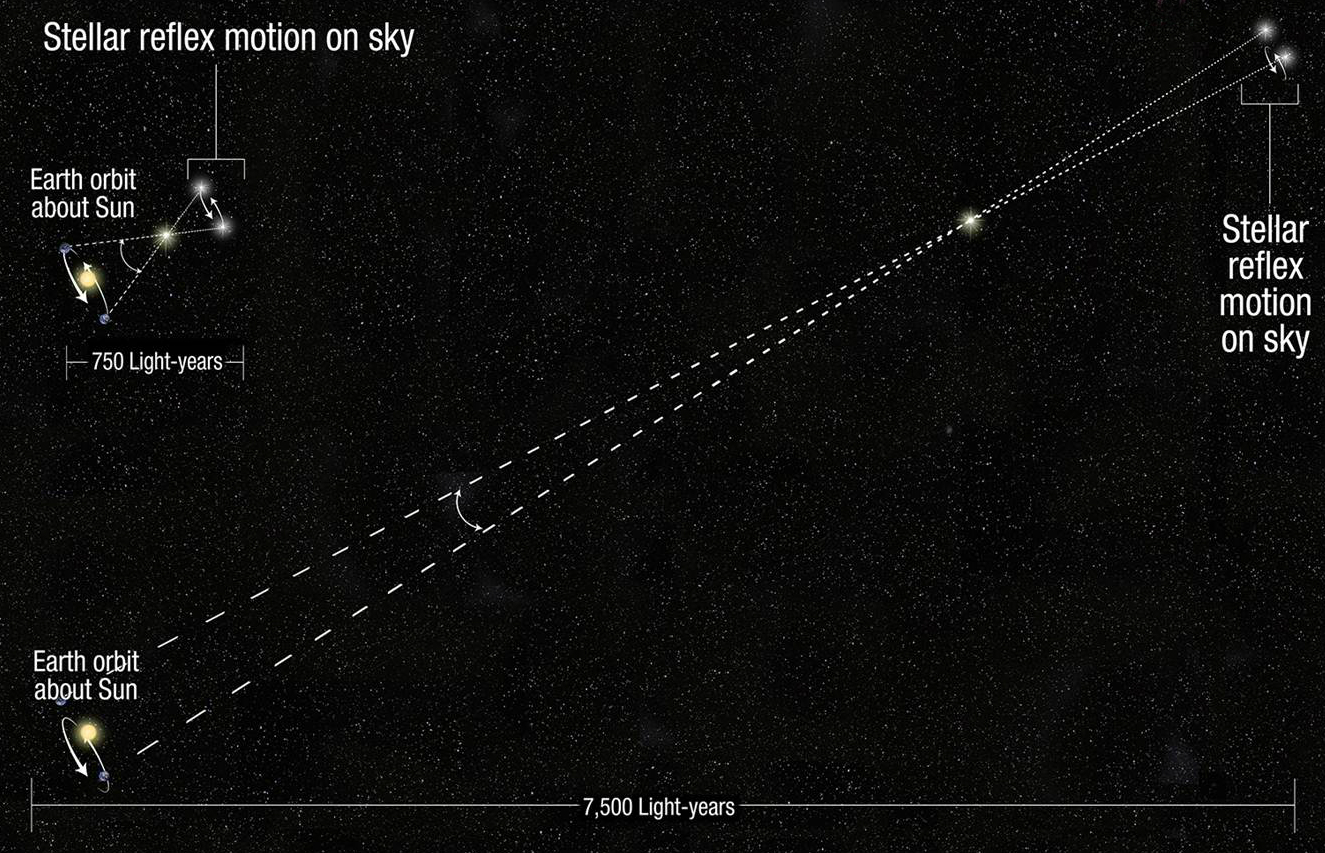
Hubble Space Telescope – Spatial scanning precisely measures distances up to 10,000 light-years away (10 April 2014).

The fact that stellar parallax was so small that it was unobservable at the time was used as the main scientific argument against heliocentrism during the early modern age. It is clear from Euclid's geometry that the effect would be undetectable if the stars were far enough away, but for various reasons such gigantic distances involved seemed entirely implausible: it was one of Tycho's principal objections to Copernican heliocentrism that for it to be compatible with the lack of observable stellar parallax, there would have to be an enormous and unlikely void between the orbit of Saturn (then the most distant known planet) and the eighth sphere (the fixed stars).

In 1989, the satellite Hipparcos was launched primarily for obtaining improved parallaxes and proper motions for over 100,000 nearby stars, increasing the reach of the method tenfold. Even so, Hipparcos was only able to measure parallax angles for stars up to about 1,600 light-years away, a little more than one percent of the diameter of the Milky Way Galaxy. The European Space Agency's Gaia mission, launched in December 2013, can measure parallax angles to an accuracy of 10 microarcseconds, thus mapping nearby stars (and potentially planets) up to a distance of tens of thousands of light-years from Earth. In April 2014, NASA astronomers reported that the Hubble Space Telescope, by using spatial scanning, can precisely measure distances up to 10,000 light-years away, a ten-fold improvement over earlier measurements.

== Diurnal parallax ==
Diurnal parallax is a parallax that varies with the rotation of the Earth or with a difference in location on the Earth. The Moon and to a smaller extent the terrestrial planets or asteroids seen from different viewing positions on the Earth (at one given moment) can appear differently placed against the background of fixed stars.

The diurnal parallax has been used by John Flamsteed in 1672 to measure the distance to Mars at its opposition and through that to estimate the astronomical unit and the size of the Solar System.

=== Lunar parallax ===
Lunar parallax (often short for lunar horizontal parallax or lunar equatorial horizontal parallax), is a special case of (diurnal) parallax: the Moon, being the nearest celestial body, has by far the largest maximum parallax of any celestial body, at times exceeding 1 degree.

The diagram for stellar parallax can illustrate lunar parallax as well if the diagram is taken to be scaled right down and slightly modified. Instead of 'near star', read 'Moon', and instead of taking the circle at the bottom of the diagram to represent the size of the Earth's orbit around the Sun, take it to be the size of the Earth's globe, and a circle around the Earth's surface. Then, the lunar (horizontal) parallax amounts to the difference in angular position, relative to the background of distant stars, of the Moon as seen from two different viewing positions on the Earth.

One of the viewing positions is the place from which the Moon can be seen directly overhead at a given moment. That is, viewed along the vertical line in the diagram. The other viewing position is a place from which the Moon can be seen on the horizon at the same moment. That is, viewed along one of the diagonal lines, from an Earth-surface position corresponding roughly to one of the blue dots on the modified diagram.

The lunar (horizontal) parallax can alternatively be defined as the angle subtended at the distance of the Moon by the radius of the Earth—equal to angle p in the diagram when scaled-down and modified as mentioned above.

The lunar horizontal parallax at any time depends on the linear distance of the Moon from the Earth. The Earth-Moon linear distance varies continuously as the Moon follows its perturbed and approximately elliptical orbit around the Earth. The range of the variation in linear distance is from about 56 to 63.7 Earth radii, corresponding to a horizontal parallax of about a degree of arc, but ranging from about 61.4' to about 54'. The Astronomical Almanac and similar publications tabulate the lunar horizontal parallax and/or the linear distance of the Moon from the Earth on a periodical e.g. daily basis for the convenience of astronomers (and of celestial navigators), and the study of how this coordinate varies with time forms part of lunar theory.

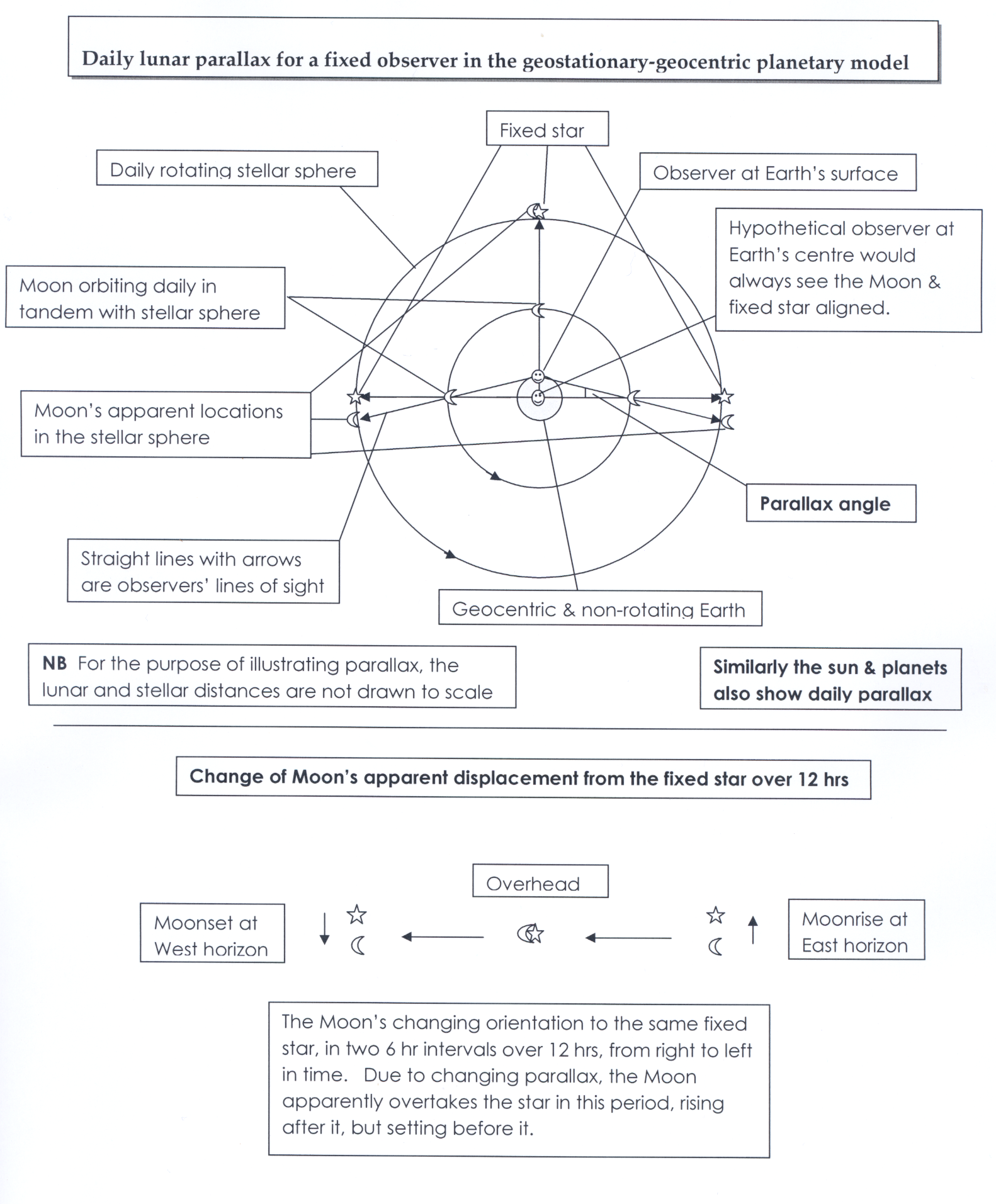
Diagram of daily lunar parallax

Parallax can also be used to determine the distance to the Moon.

One way to determine the lunar parallax from one location is by using a lunar eclipse. A full shadow of the Earth on the Moon has an apparent radius of curvature equal to the difference between the apparent radii of the Earth and the Sun as seen from the Moon. This radius can be seen to be equal to 0.75 degrees, from which (with the solar apparent radius of 0.25 degrees) we get an Earth apparent radius of 1 degree. This yields for the Earth-Moon distance 60.27 Earth radii or 384,399 kilometres (238,854 mi) This procedure was first used by Aristarchus of Samos and Hipparchus, and later found its way into the work of Ptolemy.

The diagram at the right shows how daily lunar parallax arises on the geocentric and geostatic planetary model, in which the Earth is at the center of the planetary system and does not rotate. It also illustrates the important point that parallax need not be caused by any motion of the observer, contrary to some definitions of parallax that say it is, but may arise purely from motion of the observed.

Another method is to take two pictures of the Moon at the same time from two locations on Earth and compare the positions of the Moon relative to the stars. Using the orientation of the Earth, those two position measurements, and the distance between the two locations on the Earth, the distance to the Moon can be triangulated:

$$\mathrm{distance}_{\mathrm{moon}} = \frac {\mathrm{distance}_{\mathrm{observerbase}}} {\tan (\mathrm{angle})}$$

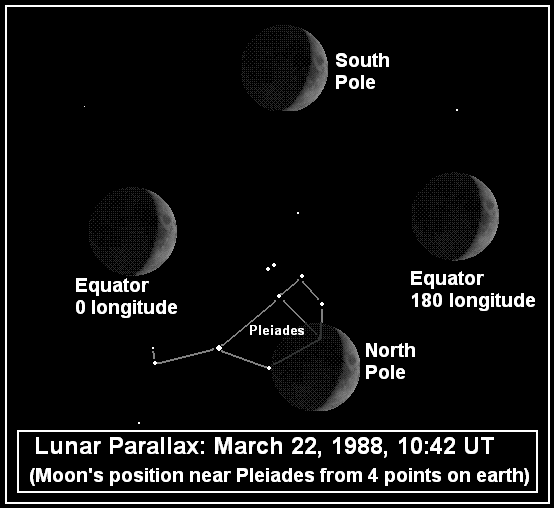
Example of lunar parallax: Occultation of Pleiades by the Moon

This is the method referred to by Jules Verne in his 1865 novel From the Earth to the Moon:

Until then, many people had no idea how one could calculate the distance separating the Moon from the Earth. The circumstance was exploited to teach them that this distance was obtained by measuring the parallax of the Moon. If the word parallax appeared to amaze them, they were told that it was the angle subtended by two straight lines running from both ends of the Earth's radius to the Moon. If they had doubts about the perfection of this method, they were immediately shown that not only did this mean distance amount to a whole two hundred thirty-four thousand three hundred and forty-seven miles (94,330 leagues) but also that the astronomers were not in error by more than seventy miles (≈ 30 leagues).

== Solar parallax ==
After Copernicus proposed his heliocentric system, with the Earth in revolution around the Sun, it was possible to build a model of the whole Solar System without scale. To ascertain the scale, it is necessary only to measure one distance within the Solar System, e.g., the mean distance from the Earth to the Sun (now called an astronomical unit, or AU). When found by triangulation, this is referred to as the solar parallax, the difference in position of the Sun as seen from the Earth's center and a point one Earth radius away, i.e., the angle subtended at the Sun by the Earth's mean radius. Knowing the solar parallax and the mean Earth radius allows one to calculate the AU, the first, small step on the long road of establishing the size and expansion age of the visible Universe.

A primitive way to determine the distance to the Sun in terms of the distance to the Moon was already proposed by Aristarchus of Samos in his book On the Sizes and Distances of the Sun and Moon. He noted that the Sun, Moon, and Earth form a right triangle (with the right angle at the Moon) at the moment of first or last quarter moon. He then estimated that the Moon–Earth–Sun angle was 87°. Using correct geometry but inaccurate observational data, Aristarchus concluded that the Sun was slightly less than 20 times farther away than the Moon. The true value of this angle is close to 89° 50', and the Sun is about 390 times farther away.

Aristarchus pointed out that the Moon and Sun have nearly equal apparent angular sizes, and therefore their diameters must be in proportion to their distances from Earth. He thus concluded that the Sun was around 20 times larger than the Moon. This conclusion, although incorrect, follows logically from his incorrect data. It suggests that the Sun is larger than the Earth, which could be taken to support the heliocentric model.

Measuring Venus transit times to determine solar parallax

Although Aristarchus' results were incorrect due to observational errors, they were based on correct geometric principles of parallax, and became the basis for estimates of the size of the Solar System for almost 2000 years, until the transit of Venus was correctly observed in 1761 and 1769. This method was proposed by Edmond Halley in 1716, although he did not live to see the results. The use of Venus transits was less successful than had been hoped due to the black drop effect, but the resulting estimate, 153 million kilometers, is just 2% above the currently accepted value, 149.6 million kilometers.

Much later, the Solar System was "scaled" using the parallax of asteroids, some of which, such as Eros, pass much closer to Earth than Venus. In a favorable opposition, Eros can approach the Earth to within 22 million kilometers. During the opposition of 1900–1901, a worldwide program was launched to make parallax measurements of Eros to determine the solar parallax (or distance to the Sun), with the results published in 1910 by Arthur Hinks of Cambridge and Charles D. Perrine of the Lick Observatory, University of California.

Perrine published progress reports in 1906 and 1908. He took 965 photographs with the Crossley Reflector and selected 525 for measurement. A similar program was then carried out, during a closer approach, in 1930–1931 by Harold Spencer Jones. The value of the Astronomical Unit (roughly the Earth-Sun distance) obtained by this program was considered definitive until 1968, when radar and dynamical parallax methods started producing more precise measurements.

Also radar reflections, both off Venus (1958) and off asteroids, like Icarus, have been used for solar parallax determination. Today, use of spacecraft telemetry links has solved this old problem. The currently accepted value of solar parallax is 8.794143 arcseconds.

== Moving-cluster parallax ==
The open stellar cluster Hyades in Taurus extends over such a large part of the sky, 20 degrees, that the proper motions as derived from astrometry appear to converge with some precision to a perspective point north of Orion. Combining the observed apparent (angular) proper motion in seconds of arc with the also observed true (absolute) receding motion as witnessed by the Doppler redshift of the stellar spectral lines, allows estimation of the distance to the cluster (151 light-years) and its member stars in much the same way as using annual parallax.

== Dynamical parallax ==
Dynamical parallax has sometimes also been used to determine the distance to a supernova when the optical wavefront of the outburst is seen to propagate through the surrounding dust clouds at an apparent angular velocity, while its true propagation velocity is known to be the speed of light.

== Spatio-temporal parallax ==
From enhanced relativistic positioning systems, spatio-temporal parallax generalizing the usual notion of parallax in space only has been developed. Then, event fields in spacetime can be deduced directly without intermediate models of light bending by massive bodies such as the one used in the PPN formalism for instance.

== Statistical parallax ==
Two related techniques can determine the mean distances of stars by modelling the motions of stars. Both are referred to as statistical parallaxes, or individually called secular parallaxes and classical statistical parallaxes.

The motion of the Sun through space provides a longer baseline that will increase the accuracy of parallax measurements, known as secular parallax. For stars in the Milky Way disk, this corresponds to a mean baseline of 4 AU per year. For halo stars the baseline is 40 AU per year. After several decades, the baseline can be orders of magnitude greater than the Earth–Sun baseline used for traditional parallax. Secular parallax introduces a higher level of uncertainty, because the relative velocity of other stars is an additional unknown. When applied to samples of multiple stars, the uncertainty can be reduced; the precision is inversely proportional to the square root of the sample size.

The mean parallaxes and distances of a large group of stars can be estimated from their radial velocities and proper motions. This is known as a classical statistical parallax. The motions of the stars are modelled to statistically reproduce the velocity dispersion based on their distance.

== Other methods for distance measurement in astronomy ==
In astronomy, the term "parallax" has come to mean a method of estimating distances, not necessarily utilizing a true parallax, such as:

- Photometric parallax method
- Spectroscopic parallax
- Dynamical parallax

== See also ==
- Cosmic distance ladder
- Lunar distance (astronomy)
