= Helmi stream =

Stellar stream in the Milky Way Galaxy

The Helmi Stream is a stellar stream of the Milky Way galaxy. It started as a dwarf galaxy, now absorbed by the Milky Way as a stream. It was discovered in 1999, and is formed of old stars deficient in heavy elements, and has a mass of 10 to 100 million solar masses. It was absorbed by the Milky Way some 6 to 9 billion years ago.

The stream was named after Amina Helmi, who discovered this stellar stream after noticing this group of stars all moving at the same speed and in the same direction. The Helmi Stream discovery affirmed theories that the merging of galaxies played a significant role in creating the giant structures of the Milky Way galaxy.

== Ultra-metal-poor star ==
In 2026 an ultra-metal-poor star was discovered in the Helmi stream dubbed HE 0144−4657. This star is believed to have formed in a gas cloud enriched by a Population III star explosion of ~50 solar masses before the dwarf galaxy collided with the Milky Way.

== Extragalactic planet ==
The Helmi stream was briefly believed to be home to the first discovered planet purportedly of extragalactic origin, orbiting the star HIP 13044. However, further analysis of radial velocity data failed to confirm the discovery.

== See also ==
- List of stellar streams
