= SWEEPS J175853.92−291120.6 =

Star in the constellation Sagittarius

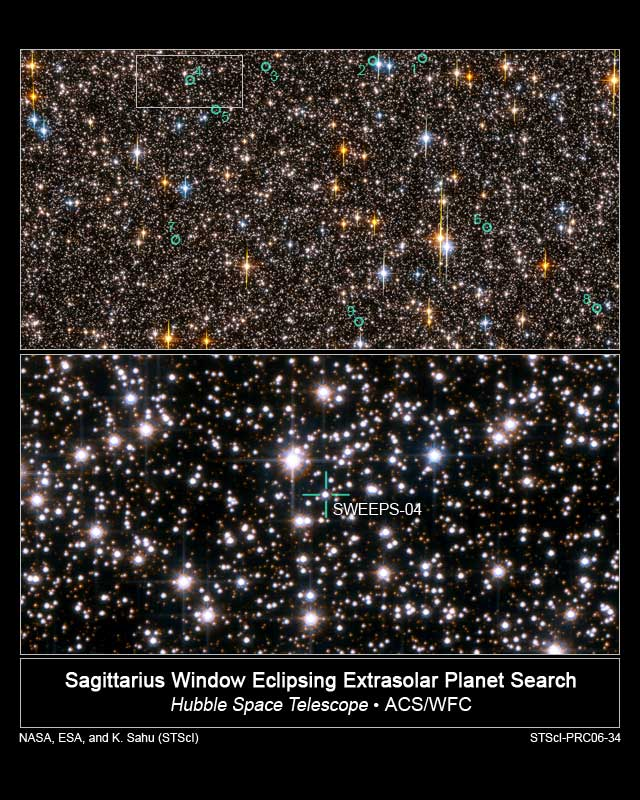

Observation data Epoch J2000.0 Equinox ICRS
- Constellation: Sagittarius
- Right ascension: 17^{h} 58^{m} 53.92^{s}
- Declination: −29° 11′ 20.6″
- Apparent magnitude (V): 18.80

Characteristics
- Spectral type: F5V

Astrometry
Distance	27,700 ly (8,500 pc)

Details
Mass	1.24 M_{☉}
Radius	1.18 R_{☉}
Metallicity [Fe/H]	0.00 dex

Database references
SIMBAD	data

SWEEPS J175853.92−291120.6 is a star located in the constellation Sagittarius at a distance of 27,700 light-years from Earth. At least one planet, SWEEPS-04, is known to orbit the star.

The star has a magnitude of 18 with a mass of 1.24 solar masses and radius of 1.18 solar radii. The designation "SWEEPS J175853.92−291120.6" is named after the project SWEEPS, formally called the Sagittarius Window Eclipsing Extrasolar Planet Search. The project also found its planetary companion.

== Planetary system ==
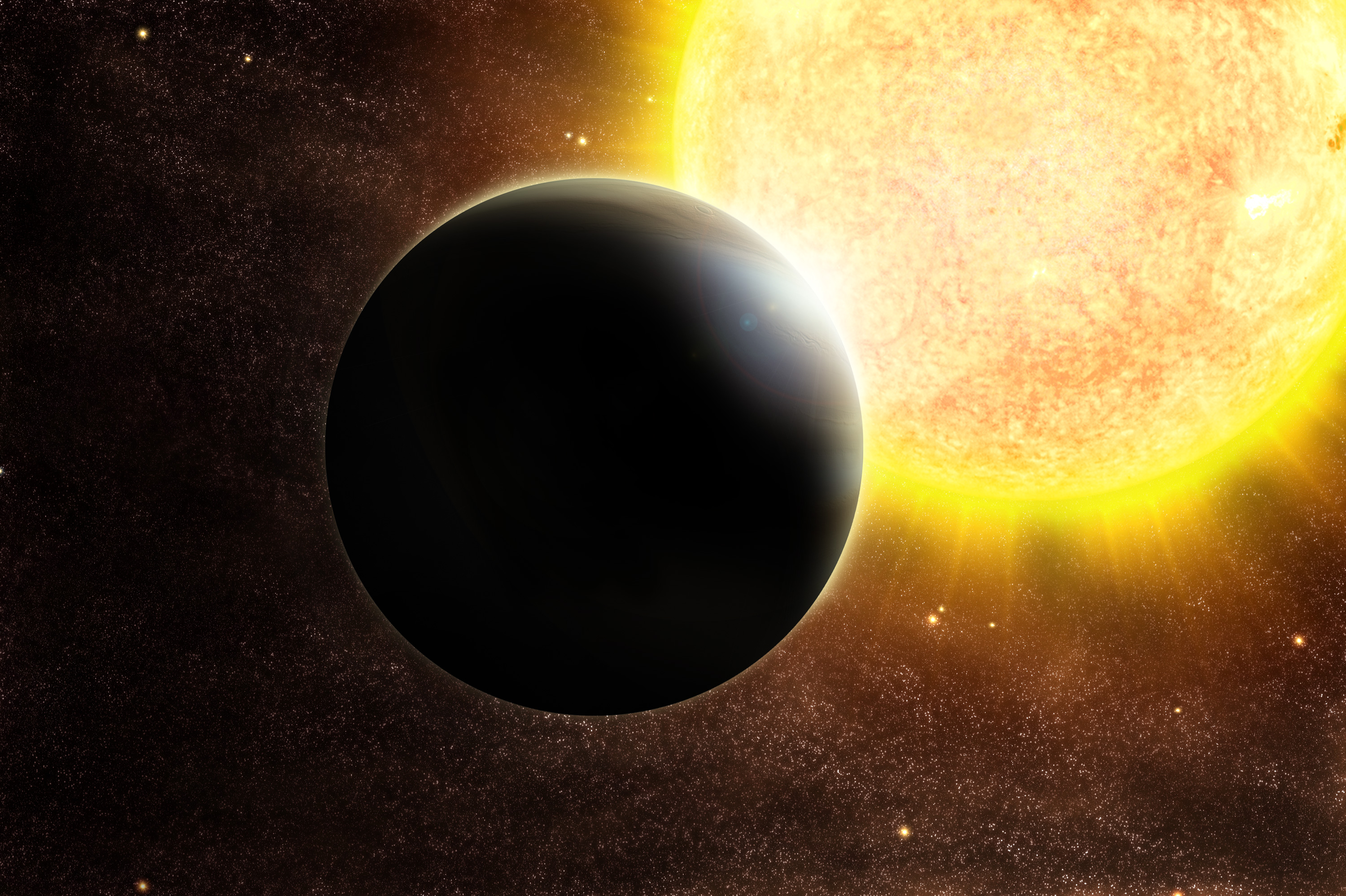
Artist's rendition of SWEEPS J175853.92-291120.6 (top right) and the planet SWEEPS-04 (center)

In 2006, a group of astronomers working on the SWEEPS program announced the discovery of the planet SWEEPS-04 in the system. The planet is a gas giant that is close to the parent star at 0.05 AU. The planet is classified as a hot Jupiter due to its proximity to the parent star. The planet was discovered through the transit method.

The SWEEPS J175853.92−291120.6 planetary system
Companion (in order from star)	Mass	Semimajor axis (AU)	Orbital period (days)	Eccentricity	Inclination (°)	Radius
SWEEPS-04	<3.8 M_{J}	0.055	4.200	–	—	0.81 ± 0.10 R_{J}

== See also ==
- List of stars in Sagittarius
