= Visual binary =

Type of stellar binary

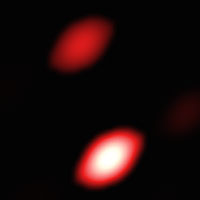
An example of a visual binary: Theta1 Orionis C1 (lower) and C2 (upper), as imaged by VLT/GRAVITY.

A visual binary is a gravitationally bound binary star system that can be visually resolved as two separate stars, as opposed to a singular point source with fluctuating brightness. Like all binaries, a visual binary consists of two stars –usually– of different brightnesses, with the brighter star considered the primary and the fainter star considered the companion. If the primary is too bright, relative to the companion, this can cause a glare making it difficult to resolve the two components. However, it is possible to resolve the system if observations of the brighter star show it to wobble about a centre of mass. In general, a visual binary can be resolved into two stars with a telescope if their centers are separated by a value greater than or equal to one arcsecond, but with modern professional telescopes, interferometry, or space-based equipment, stars can be resolved at closer distances.

For a visual binary system, measurements taken need to specify, in arc-seconds, the apparent angular separation on the sky and the position angle of the companion star relative to the primary star. Taken over a period of time, the apparent relative orbit of the visual binary system will appear on the celestial sphere. The study of visual binaries reveals useful stellar characteristics: masses, densities, surface temperatures, luminosity, and rotation rates. These stars are estimated, via Kepler's third law, to have periods ranging from a few years to thousands of years.

== Distance ==
In order to work out the masses of the components of a visual binary system, the distance to the system must first be determined, since from this astronomers can estimate the period of revolution and the separation between the two stars. The trigonometric parallax provides a direct method of calculating a star's mass. This will not apply to the visual binary systems, but it does form the basis of an indirect method called the dynamical parallax.

=== Trigonometric parallax ===
In order to use this method of calculating distance, two measurements are made of a star, one each at opposite sides of the Earth's orbit about the Sun. The star's position relative to the more distant background stars will appear displaced. The parallax value is considered to be the displacement in each direction from the mean position, equivalent to the angular displacement from observations one astronomical unit apart. The distance $d$, in parsecs is found from the following equation,

$$d = \frac{1}{\tan(p)}$$

Where $p$ is the parallax, measured in units of arc-seconds.

=== Dynamical parallax ===
This method is used solely for binary systems. The mass of the binary system is assumed to be twice that of the Sun. Kepler's Laws are then applied and the separation between the stars is determined. Once this distance is found, the distance away can be found via the arc subtended in the sky, providing a temporary distance measurement. From this measurement and the apparent magnitudes of both stars, the luminosities can be found, and by using the mass–luminosity relationship, the masses of each star. These masses are used to re-calculate the separation distance, and the process is repeated a number of times, with accuracies as high as 5% being achieved. A more sophisticated calculation factors in a star's loss of mass over time.

=== Spectroscopic parallax ===
Spectroscopic parallax is another commonly used method for determining the distance to a binary system. No parallax is measured, the word is simply used to place emphasis on the fact that the distance is being estimated. In this method, the luminosity of a star is estimated from its spectrum. The spectra from distant stars of a given type are assumed to be the same as the spectra of nearby stars of the same type. The star is then assigned a position on the Hertzsprung-Russel diagram based on where it is in its life-cycle. The star's luminosity can be estimated by comparison of the spectrum of a nearby star. The distance is then determined via the following inverse square law:

$$b = \frac{L}{4\pi d^2}$$

where $b$ is the apparent brightness and $L$ is the luminosity.

Using the Sun as a reference we can write

$$\frac{L}{L_{\odot}} = \bigg(\frac{d^{2}_{\odot}}{b}\bigg)\bigg(\frac{d^{2}}{b_{\odot}}\bigg)$$

where the subscript $\odot$ represents a parameter associated with the Sun.

Rearranging for $d^2$ gives an estimate for the distance.

$$d^2 = \bigg(\frac{L}{L_{\odot}}\bigg)\bigg(\frac{b_{\odot}}{b}\bigg)$$

== Kepler's laws ==
The two stars orbiting each other, as well as their centre of mass, must obey Kepler's laws. This means that the orbit is an ellipse with the centre of mass at one of the two foci (Kepler's 1st law) and the orbital motion satisfies the fact that a line joining the star to the centre of mass sweeps out equal areas over equal time intervals (Kepler's 2nd law). The orbital motion must also satisfy Kepler's 3rd law.

Kepler's 3rd Law can be stated as follows: "The square of the orbital period of a planet is directly proportional to the cube of its semi-major axis." Mathematically, this translates as

$$T^2 \propto a^3$$

where $T$ is the orbital period of the planet and $a$ is the semi-major axis of the orbit.

=== Newton's generalisation ===
Consider a binary star system. This consists of two objects, of mass $m_1$ and $m_2$, orbiting around their centre of mass. $m_1$ has position vector $r_1$ and orbital velocity $v_1$, and $m_2$ has position vector $r_2$ and orbital velocity $v_2$ relative to the centre of mass. The separation between the two stars is denoted $r$, and is assumed to be constant. Since the gravitational force acts along a line joining the centers of both stars, we can assume the stars have an equivalent time period around their center of mass, and therefore a constant separation between each other.

To arrive at Newton's version of Kepler's 3rd law we can start by considering Newton's 2nd law which states: "The net force acting on an object is proportional to the objects mass and resultant acceleration."

$$F_{net} = \sum \, F_{i} = ma$$

where $F_{net}$ is the net force acting on the object of mass $m$, and $a$ is the acceleration of the object.

Applying the definition of centripetal acceleration to Newton's second law gives a force of

$F = \frac{mv^2}{r}$

Then using the fact that the orbital velocity is given as

$v = \frac{2\pi r}{T}$

we can state the force on each star as

$F_{1} = \frac{4\pi^2 m_{1}r_{1}}{T^2}$ and $F_{2} = \frac{4\pi^2 m_{2}r_{2}}{T^2}$

If we apply Newton's 3rd law- "For every action there is an equal and opposite reaction"

$F_{12} = -F_{21}$

We can set the force on each star equal to each other.

$$\frac{4\pi^2 m_{1}r_{1}}{T^2} = \frac{4\pi^2 m_{2}r_{2}}{T^2}$$

This reduces to

$$r_{1}m_{1} = r_{2}m_{2}$$

If we assume that the masses are not equal, then this equation tells us that the smaller mass remains farther from the centre of mass than does the larger mass.

The separation $r$ of the two objects is

$$r = r_{1}+r_{2}$$

Since $r_1$ and $r_2$ would form a line starting from opposite directions and joining at the centre of mass.

Now we can substitute this expression into one of the equations describing the force on the stars and rearrange for $r_1$ to find an expression relating the position of one star to the masses of both and the separation between them. Equally, this could have been solved for $r_2$. We find that

$$r_{1} = \frac{m_{2}a}{(m_{1}+m_{2})}$$

Substituting this equation into the equation for the force on one of the stars, setting it equal to Newton's Universal Law of Gravitation (namely, $F=Gm_{1}m_{2}/a^2$, and solving for the period squared yields the required result.

$T^2 = \frac{4\pi^2 a^3}{G(m_{1}+m_{2})}$

This is Newton's version of Kepler's 3rd Law. Unless $G$ is in non-standard units, this will not work if mass is measured in solar masses, the orbital period is measured in years, and the orbital semi-major axis is measured in astronomical units (e.g., use the Earth's orbital parameters). It will work if SI units, for instance, are used throughout.

== Determining stellar masses ==
Binary systems are particularly important here – because they are orbiting each other, their gravitational interaction can be studied by observing parameters of their orbit around each other and the centre of mass. Before applying Kepler's 3rd Law, the inclination of the orbit of the visual binary must be taken into account. Relative to an observer on Earth, the orbital plane will usually be tilted. If it is at 0° the planes will be seen to coincide and if at 90° they will be seen edge on. Due to this inclination, the elliptical true orbit will project an elliptical apparent orbit onto the plane of the sky. Kepler's 3rd law still holds but with a constant of proportionality that changes with respect to the elliptical apparent orbit. The inclination of the orbit can be determined by measuring the separation between the primary star and the apparent focus. Once this information is known the true eccentricity and the true semi-major axis can be calculated since the apparent orbit will be shorter than the true orbit, assuming an inclination greater than 0°, and this effect can be corrected for using simple geometry

$$a=\frac{a''}{p''}$$

Where $a''$ is the true semi-major axis and $p''$ is the parallax.

Once the true orbit is known, Kepler's 3rd law can be applied. We re-write it in terms of the observable quantities such that

$$(m_{1}+m_{2})T^2 = \frac{4\pi^2 (a''/p'')^3}{G}$$

From this equation we obtain the sum of the masses involved in the binary system. Remembering a previous equation we derived,

$$r_{1}m_{1} = r_{2}m_{2}$$

where

$$r_{1} + r_{2} = r$$

we can solve the ratio of the semi-major axis and therefore a ratio for the two masses since

$$\frac{a_{1}''}{a_{2}''} = \frac{a_{1}}{a_{2}}$$

and

$$\frac{a_{1}}{a_{2}} = \frac{m_{2}}{m_{1}}$$

The individual masses of the stars follow from these ratios and knowing the separation between each star and the centre of mass of the system.

== Mass–luminosity relationship ==
In order to find the luminosity of the stars, the rate of flow of radiant energy, otherwise known as radiant flux, must be observed. When the observed luminosities and masses are graphed, the mass–luminosity relation is obtained. This relationship was found by Arthur Eddington in 1924.

$$\frac{L}{L_{\odot}} = \left(\frac{M}{M_{\odot}}\right)^\alpha$$

Where L is the luminosity of the star and M is its mass. L_{☉} and M_{☉} are the luminosity and mass of the Sun. The value $\alpha$ = 3.5 is commonly used for main-sequence stars. This equation and the usual value of a = 3.5 only applies to main-sequence stars with masses 2M_{☉} < M < 20M_{☉} and does not apply to red giants or white dwarfs. For these stars, the equation applies with different constants, since these stars have different masses. For the different ranges of masses, an adequate form of the Mass–Luminosity Relation is

$$\frac{L}{L_{\odot}} \approx .23\left(\frac{M}{M_{\odot}}\right)^{2.3}   \qquad (M < .43M_{\odot})$$
$$\frac{L}{L_{\odot}} = \left(\frac{M}{M_{\odot}}\right)^4   \qquad\qquad      (.43M_{\odot} < M < 2M_{\odot})$$
$$\frac{L}{L_{\odot}} \approx 1.5\left(\frac{M}{M_{\odot}}\right)^{3.5}   \qquad (2M_{\odot} < M < 20M_{\odot})$$
$$\frac{L}{L_{\odot}} \varpropto \frac{M}{M_{\odot}}   \qquad (M > 20M_{\odot})$$

The greater a star's luminosity, the greater its mass will be. The absolute magnitude or luminosity of a star can be found by knowing the distance to it and its apparent magnitude. The stars bolometric magnitude is plotted against its mass, in units of the Sun's mass. This is determined through observation and then the mass of the star is read of the plot. Giants and main sequence stars tend to agree with this, but super giants do not and neither do white dwarfs. The Mass–Luminosity Relation is very useful because, due to the observation of binaries, particularly the visual binaries since the masses of many stars have been found this way, astronomers have gained insight into the evolution of stars, including how they are born.

== Spectral classification ==
Generally speaking, there are three classes of binary systems. These can be determined by considering the colours of the two components.

"1. Systems consisting of a red or reddish primary star and a blueish secondary star, usually a magnitude or more fainter... 2. Systems in which the differences in magnitude and colour are both small... 3. Systems in which the fainter star is the redder of the two..."

The luminosity of class 1 binaries is greater than that of class 3 binaries. There is a relationship between the color difference of binaries and their reduced proper motions. In 1921, Frederick C. Leonard, at the Lick Observatory, wrote "1. The spectrum of the secondary component of a dwarf star is generally redder than that of the primary, whereas the spectrum of the fainter component of a giant star is usually bluer than that of the brighter one. In both cases, the absolute difference in spectral class seems ordinarily to be related to the disparity between the components...2. With some exceptions, the spectra of the components of double stars are so related to each other that they conform to the Hertzsprung-Russell configuration of the stars..."

An interesting case for visual binaries occurs when one or both components are located above or below the Main-Sequence. If a star is more luminous than a Main-Sequence star, it is either very young, and therefore contracting due to gravity, or is at the post Main-Sequence stage of its evolution. The study of binaries is useful here because, unlike with single stars, it is possible to determine which reason is the case. If the primary is gravitationally contracting, then the companion will be further away from the Main-Sequence than the primary since the more massive star becomes a Main-Sequence star much faster than the less massive star.
