= SWEEPS-04 =

Exoplanet

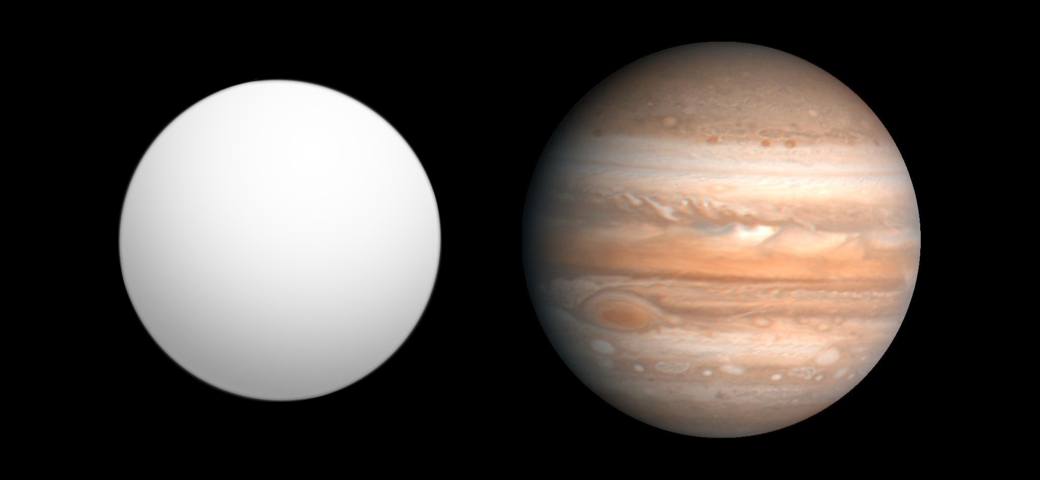
- Size comparison of SWEEPS-04 with Jupiter

Discovery
- Discovered by: Sahu et al.
- Discovery date: October 4, 2006
- Detection method: Transit

Orbital characteristics
- Semi-major axis: 0.055 AU (8,200,000 km)
- Orbital period (sidereal): 4.2 d
- Inclination: >87
- Star: SWEEPS J175853.92−291120.6

Physical characteristics
- Mean radius: 0.81±0.1 R_{J}
- Mass: <3.8 M_{J}

SWEEPS-04 is an extrasolar planet orbiting the star SWEEPS J175853.92−291120.6 in the constellation Sagittarius approximately 27,710 light years away (based on a distance modulus of 14.1) from the Solar System, making it (along with SWEEPS-11) the most distant exoplanet(s) known. This planet was found in 2006 by the Sagittarius Window Eclipsing Extrasolar Planet Search (SWEEPS) program that uses the transit method.

The upper limit on the planet's mass is 3.8 times the mass of Jupiter. The best fit radius is 0.81 times that of Jupiter, but the uncertainty in this value is large, around 12%. It orbits at an average distance of 8,200,000 km (0.055 AU) from the parent star, taking 4.2 days to revolve around it.

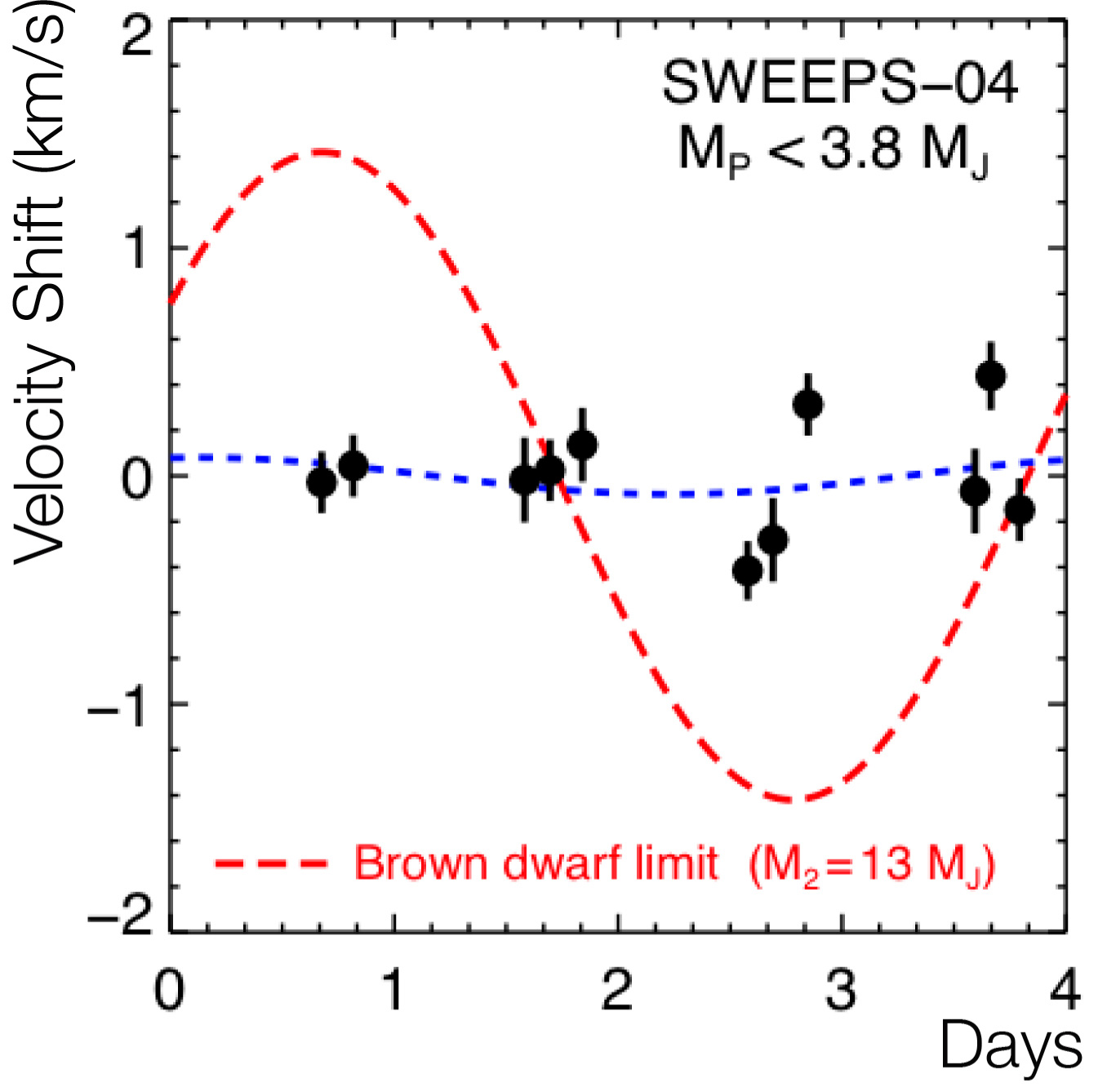
Radial Velocities of SWEEPS-04 (UVES-VLT)

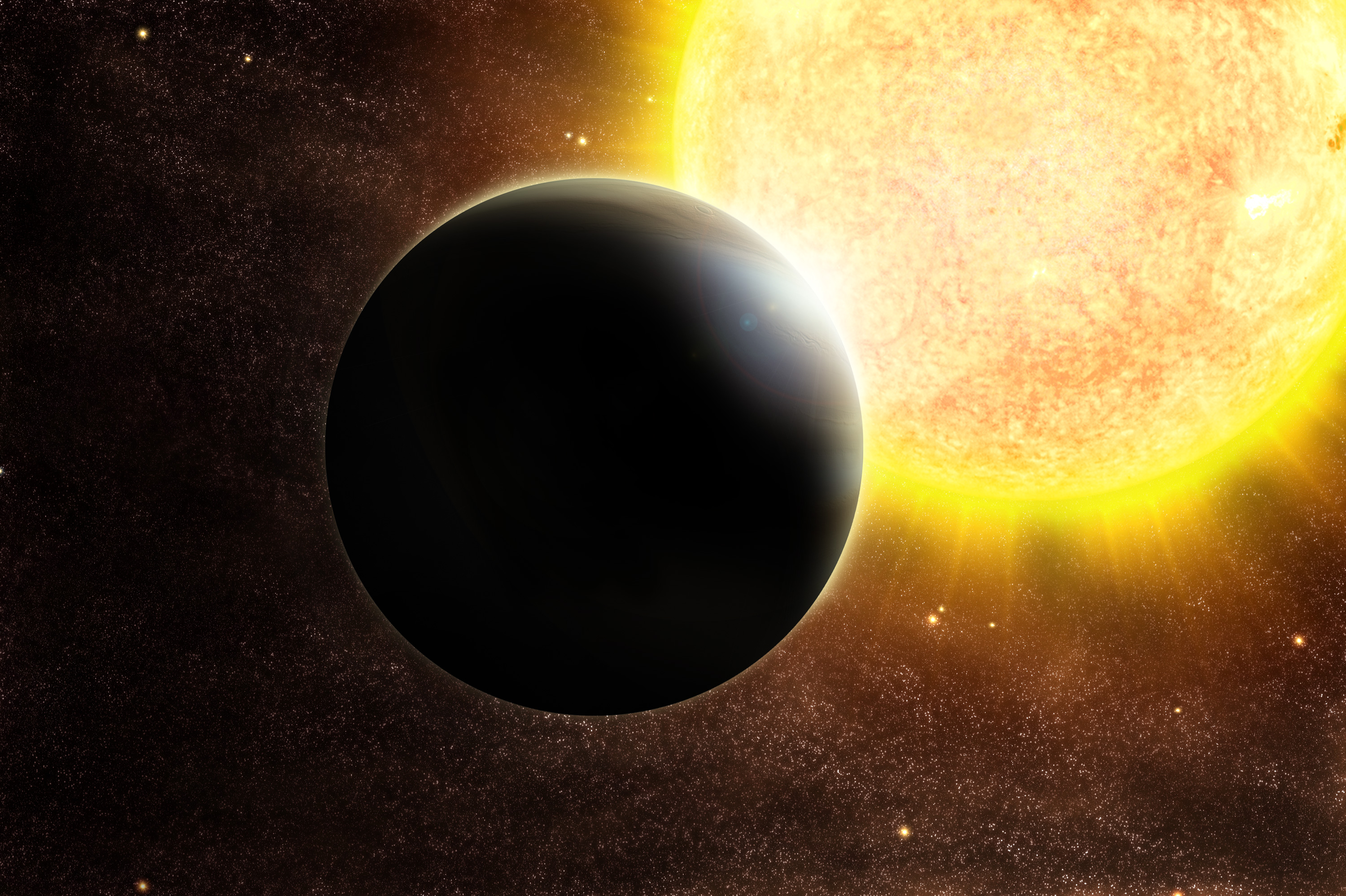
Artist's impression of a transiting Jupiter-mass exoplanet SWEEPS J175853.92-291120.6 b

== See also ==
- Sagittarius Window Eclipsing Extrasolar Planet Search or SWEEPS
- SWEEPS-10
- SWEEPS-11
- List of extrasolar planets
