= Amina Helmi =

Argentine astronomer (born 1970)

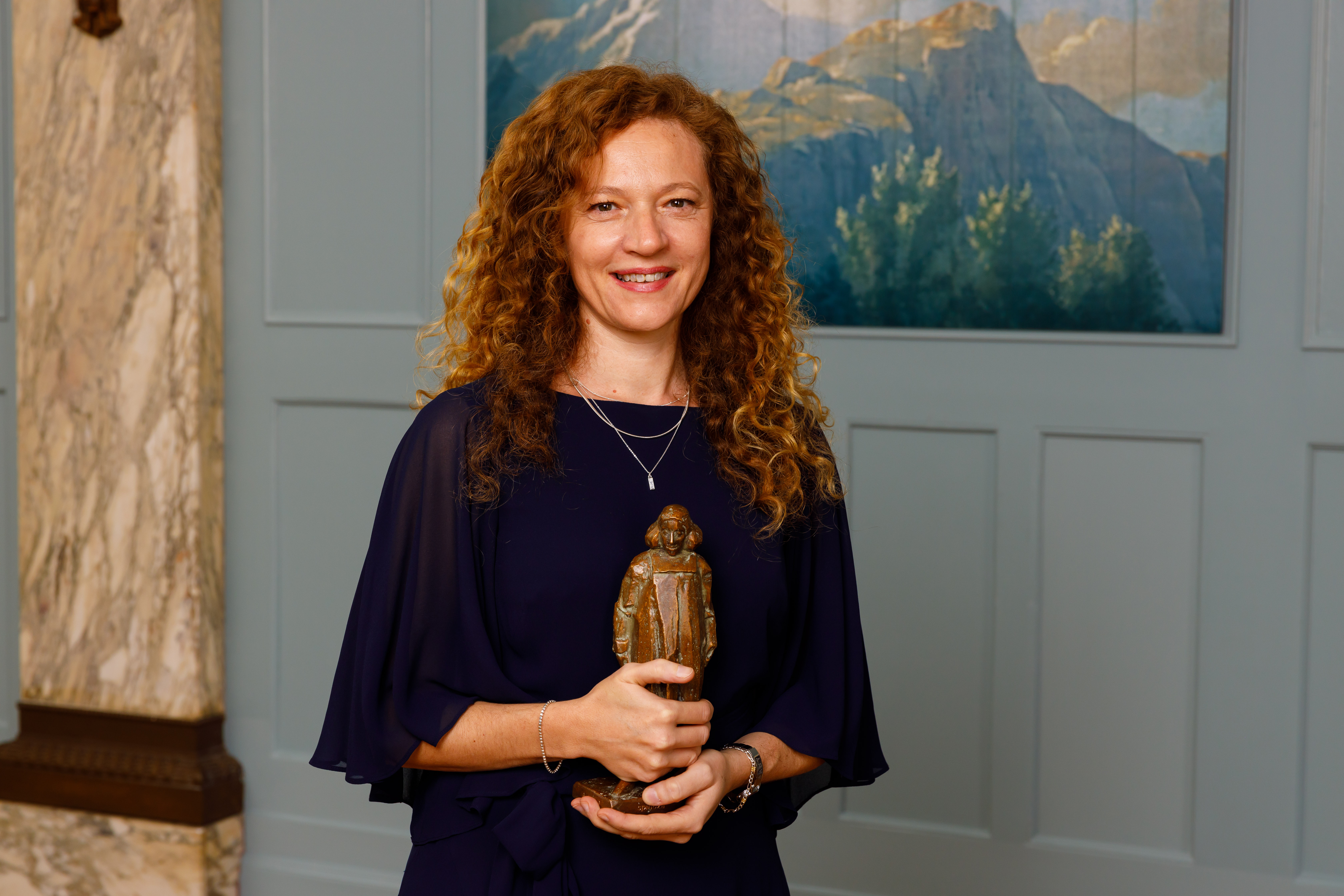
- Amina Helmi in 2019
- Born: 6 September 1970 (age 56); Bahía Blanca, Buenos Aires Province, Argentina
- Education: Leiden University (PhD)
- Known for: Helmi stream
- Awards: Spinoza Prize (2019); Suffrage Science award (2019) Kavli Prize (2026)
- Scientific career
- Fields: Astronomy
- Workplaces: University of Groningen; University of La Plata; Max Planck Institute for Astrophysics; Utrecht University
- Thesis: The formation of the Galactic Halo (2000)
- Doctoral advisors: Tim de Zeeuw; Simon White
- Website: www.astro.rug.nl/~ahelmi/

Amina Helmi (6 October 1970) is an Argentine astronomer and professor at the Kapteyn Astronomical Institute at the University of Groningen in the Netherlands.

== Education ==
Helmi was graduated in astronomy from the National University of La Plata. She was educated at Leiden University where she was awarded a PhD in 2000 with a thesis on the formation of the galactic halo, supervised by Tim de Zeeuw and Simon White.

== Career and research ==
Since 2003 Helmi has been faculty member at the University of Groningen, and has been a full professor since 2014. Previously, she held postdoctoral positions at the University of La Plata in Argentina, the Max Planck Institute for Astrophysics in Germany, and Utrecht University in the Netherlands.

Her research focuses investigates the evolution and dynamics of galaxies, in particular the Milky Way, using locations, velocities, ages, and chemical abundances of stars to understand the formation process of galaxies, known as galactic archaeology. She also studies the nature of dark matter. In her research, Helmi uses computer simulations as well as observational data from for example the Gaia space telescope.

=== Awards and honors ===
In 2019, Helmi was named one of the four winners of the Spinoza Prize. She was awarded membership of the Royal Netherlands Academy of Arts and Sciences in 2017.

She was awarded the Christiaan Huygensprize in 2004 and the Pastoor Schmeitsprize in 2010.

The Helmi stream is named after her and she was awarded the Suffrage Science award in 2019.

In 2021, Helmi won the Brouwer Award from the Division on Dynamical Astronomy of the American Astronomical Society.

In 2026, she was awarded the Kavli Prize in the category of "Astrophysics".
