= Sagittarius Window Eclipsing Extrasolar Planet Search =

2006 astronomical survey

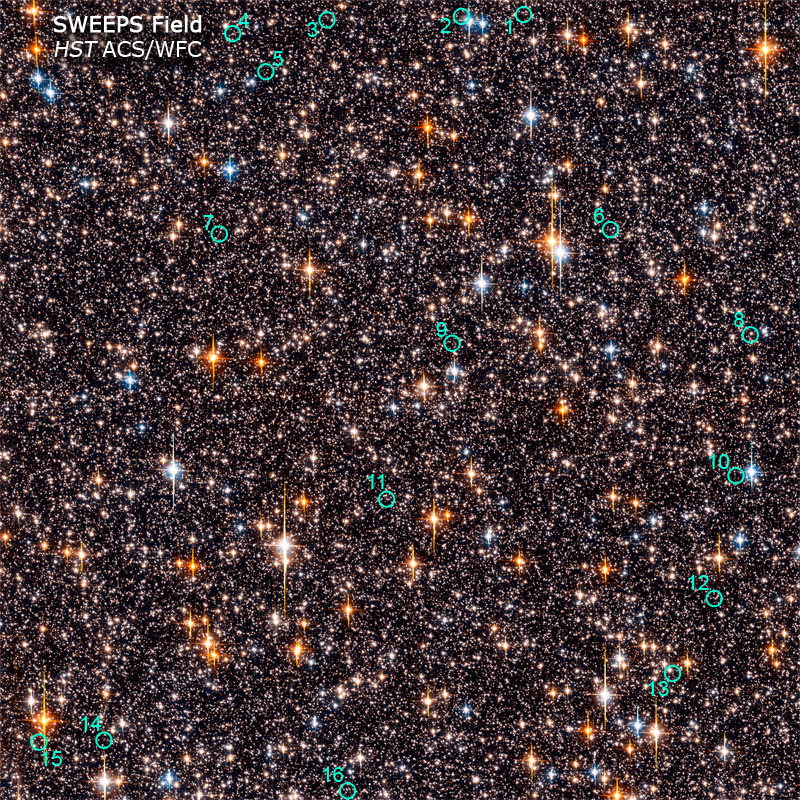
- Detail image with exoplanet locations indicated with green circles
- Alternative names: SWEEPS
- Related media on Commons

The Sagittarius Window Eclipsing Extrasolar Planet Search, or SWEEPS, was a 2006 astronomical survey project using the Hubble Space Telescope's Advanced Camera for Surveys – Wide Field Channel to monitor 180,000 stars for seven days to detect extrasolar planets via the transit method.

== Area examined ==
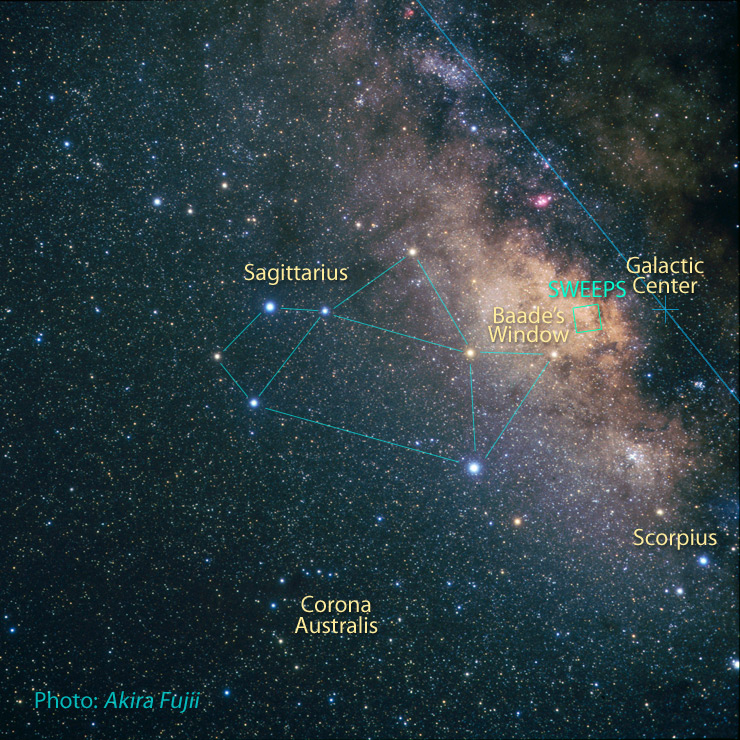
SWEEPS search area

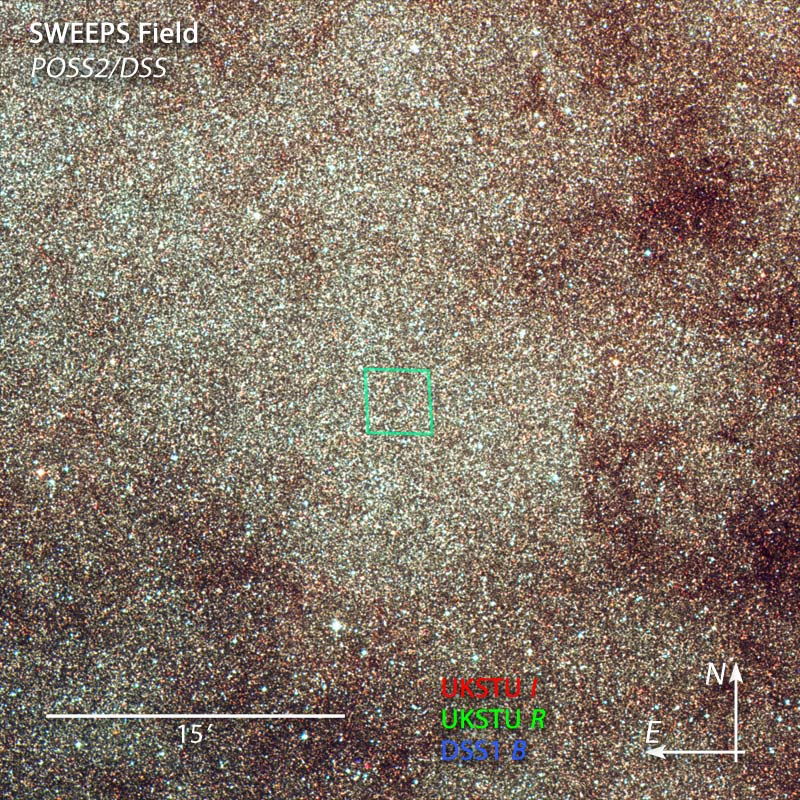
SWEEPS search area detail

The stars that were monitored in this astronomical survey were all located in the Sagittarius-I Window. The Sagittarius Window is a rare view to the Milky Way's central bulge stars: our view to most of the galaxy's central stars is generally blocked by lanes of dust. These stars in the galaxy's central bulge region are approximately 27,000 light years from Earth.

== Planets discovered ==
Sixteen candidate planets were discovered with orbital periods ranging from 0.6 to 4.2 days. Planets with orbital periods less than 1.2 days have not previously been detected, and have been dubbed "ultra-short period planets" (USPPs) by the search team. USPPs were discovered only around low-mass stars, suggesting that larger stars destroyed any planets orbiting so closely or that planets were unable to migrate as far inward around larger stars.

Planets were found with roughly the same frequency of occurrence as in the local neighborhood of Earth.

SWEEPS-4 and SWEEPS-11 orbited stars that were sufficiently visually distinct from their neighbors that follow-up observations using the radial velocity method were possible, allowing their masses to be determined.

This table is constructed from information obtained from the Extrasolar Planets Encyclopedia and SIMBAD databases that reference the Nature article as their source.

Star	Constellation	Right ascension	Declination	App. mag.	Distance (ly)	Spectral type	Planet	Mass (M_{J})	Radius (R_{J})	Orbital period (d)	Semimajor axis (AU)	Orbital eccentricity	Inclination (°)	Discovery year
SWEEPS J175853.29-291233.5	Sagittarius	17^{h} 58^{m} 53^{s}	−29° 12′ 33″	22.2	~22000		SWEEPS-01	?	1.01	1.56	0.025	?	86+	2006
SWEEPS J175853.38-291217.8	Sagittarius	17^{h} 58^{m} 53^{s}	−29° 12′ 18″	25.1	~22000		SWEEPS-02	?	1.37	0.912	0.015	?	86+	2006
SWEEPS J175853.57-291144.1	Sagittarius	17^{h} 58^{m} 53^{s}	−29° 11′ 44″	22.5	~22000		SWEEPS-03	?	0.87	1.27	0.021	?	86+	2006
SWEEPS J175853.92−291120.6	Sagittarius	17^{h} 58^{m} 54^{s}	−29° 11′ 21″	18.8	~22000		SWEEPS-04	<3.8	0.81	4.2	0.055	?	87+	2006
SWEEPS J175854.60-291128.2	Sagittarius	17^{h} 58^{m} 55^{s}	−29° 11′ 28″	23.9	~22000		SWEEPS-05	?	1.09	2.313	0.030	?	87+	2006
SWEEPS J175857.29-291253.4	Sagittarius	17^{h} 58^{m} 57^{s}	−29° 12′ 53″	19.5	~22000		SWEEPS-06	?	0.82	3.039	0.042	?	86+	2006
SWEEPS J175857.69-291114.5	Sagittarius	17^{h} 58^{m} 58^{s}	−29° 11′ 15″	21.5	~22000		SWEEPS-07	?	0.9	1.747	0.027	?	86+	2006
SWEEPS J175859.24-291328.7	Sagittarius	17^{h} 58^{m} 59^{s}	−29° 13′ 29″	21.7	~22000		SWEEPS-08	?	0.98	0.868	0.017	?	84+	2006
SWEEPS J175859.60-291211.8	Sagittarius	17^{h} 59^{m} 00^{s}	−29° 12′ 12″	22.5	~22000		SWEEPS-09	?	1.01	1.617	0.025	?	86+	2006
SWEEPS J175902.00-291323.7	Sagittarius	17^{h} 59^{m} 02^{s}	−29° 13′ 24″	26.2	~22000		SWEEPS-10	?	1.24	0.424	0.008	?	84+	2006
SWEEPS J175902.67−291153.5	Sagittarius	17^{h} 59^{m} 03^{s}	−29° 11′ 54″	19.83	~22000		SWEEPS-11	9.7	1.13	1.796	0.03	?	84+	2006
SWEEPS J175904.44-291317.1	Sagittarius	17^{h} 59^{m} 04^{s}	−29° 13′ 17″	21.8	~22000		SWEEPS-12	?	0.91	2.952	0.038	?	87+	2006
SWEEPS J175905.95-291305.6	Sagittarius	17^{h} 59^{m} 04^{s}	−29° 13′ 17″	21.38	~22000		SWEEPS-13	?	0.78	1.684	0.027	?	86+	2006
SWEEPS J175907.56-291039.8	Sagittarius	17^{h} 59^{m} 04^{s}	−29° 13′ 17″	22.38	~22000		SWEEPS-14	?	0.93	2.965	0.037	?	87+	2006
SWEEPS J175907.64-291023.7	Sagittarius	17^{h} 59^{m} 04^{s}	−29° 13′ 17″	25.66	~22000		SWEEPS-15	?	1.37	0.541	0.010	?	84+	2006
SWEEPS J175908.44-291140.6	Sagittarius	17^{h} 59^{m} 08^{s}	−29° 11′ 41″	23.78	~22000		SWEEPS-16	?	1.4	0.969	0.017	?	85+	2006

== See also ==
- Baade's Window
- Optical Gravitational Lensing Experiment or OGLE also examines the galactic bulge for planets.
