= SWEEPS-11 =

Hot Jupiter orbiting SWEEPS J175902.67-291153.5

SWEEPS - 11
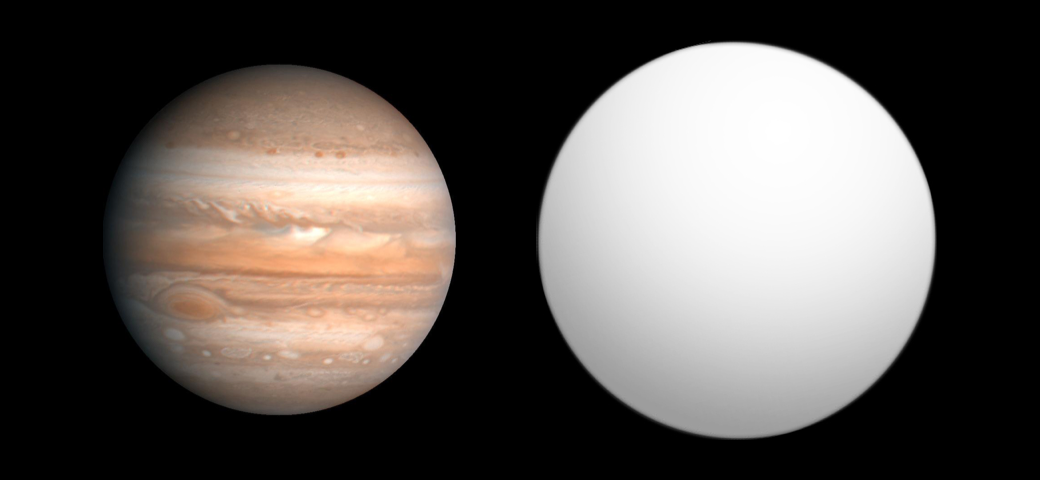
- Size comparison of SWEEPS-11 with Jupiter

Discovery
- Discovered by: SWEEPS
- Discovery date: October 4, 2006
- Detection method: Transit

Orbital characteristics
- Semi-major axis: 0.03 AU (4,500,000 km)
- Orbital period (sidereal): 1.796 days
- Inclination: >84
- Star: SWEEPS J175902.67−291153.5

Physical characteristics
- Mean radius: 1.13±0.21 R_{J}
- Mass: 9.7±5.6 M_{J}

SWEEPS-11 is an extrasolar planet orbiting SWEEPS J175902.67−291153.5 in the constellation Sagittarius, around 27,710 light years away from the Solar System (based on a distance modulus of 14.1), making it (along with SWEEPS-04) the most distant exoplanet(s) known. This planet was found in 2006 by the Sagittarius Window Eclipsing Extrasolar Planet Search (SWEEPS) program that uses the transit method.

This hot Jupiter has a mass 9.7 times that of Jupiter and a diameter of 1.13 times that of Jupiter, but the uncertainty in this value is large, around 21%. The planet orbits at around 1.75 times closer to the star than 51 Pegasi b is to 51 Pegasi, taking only 1.8 days or 43 hours to orbit the star. It is also the most distant planet yet discovered.

== See also ==
- SWEEPS-04
- SWEEPS-10
