= Spectroscopic parallax =

Astronomical measurement method

Spectroscopic parallax is an astronomical method for measuring the distances to stars.

Despite its name, it does not rely on the geometric parallax effect. The spectroscopic parallax technique can be applied to any star for which a spectrum can be recorded. The method depends on the star being sufficiently bright to provide a measurable spectrum, which as of 2013 limits its range to about 10,000 parsecs.

To apply this method, one must measure the apparent magnitude of the star and know the spectral type of the star. The spectral type can be determined by observing the star's spectrum. If the star lies on the main sequence, as determined by its luminosity class, the spectral type of the star provides a good estimate of the star's absolute magnitude. Knowing the apparent magnitude (m) and absolute magnitude (M) of the star, one can calculate the distance (d, in parsecs) of the star using $m - M = 5 \log (d/10)$ (see distance modulus). The true distance to the star may be different than the one calculated due to interstellar extinction.

The method ultimately derives from the spectroscopic studies of sunspots and stars by Walter Sydney Adams and Ernst Arnold Kohlschütter in 1914.

The method is an important step on the cosmic distance ladder.

== See also ==
- Parallax in astronomy
- Photometric parallax method
- Dynamical parallax
- Distance modulus
