= HIP 13044 =

Star in the constellation Fornax

- HIP 13044 (center) from the Digitized Sky Survey

Observation data Epoch J2000.0 Equinox ICRS
- Constellation: Fornax
- Right ascension: 02^{h} 47^{m} 37.44310^{s}
- Declination: −36° 06′ 27.0322″
- Apparent magnitude (V): +9.94

Characteristics
- Evolutionary stage: horizontal branch
- Spectral type: F2
- B−V color index: +0.466±0.026

Astrometry
Radial velocity (R_{v})	300 km/s
Proper motion (μ)	RA: +3.083 mas/yr Dec.: −12.573 mas/yr
Parallax (π)	1.3705±0.0499 mas
Distance	2,380 ± 90 ly (730 ± 30 pc)
Absolute magnitude (M_{V})	+0.62

Details
Mass	0.8±0.1 M_{☉}
Radius	6.7±0.3 R_{☉}
Temperature	6,025±63 K
Metallicity [Fe/H]	−2.09±0.26 dex
Rotation	5.53±0.73 d

Other designations
- CD−36°1052, HIP 13044, SAO 193917, PPM 278353

Database references
SIMBAD	data

HIP 13044 is a red horizontal-branch star about 2,300 light years (700 pc) from Earth in the constellation Fornax. The star is part of the Helmi stream, a former dwarf galaxy that merged with the Milky Way between six and nine billion years ago. As a result, HIP 13044 circles the Galactic Center at a highly irregular orbit with respect to the galactic plane. HIP 13044 is slightly less massive than the Sun, but is approximately seven times its size. The star, which is estimated to be at least nine billion years old, has passed the red-giant phase. The relatively fast rotation of the star may be due to having engulfed one or more planets during the red-giant phase.

== Observational history ==
A science team from the Max Planck Institute for Astronomy first observed HIP 13044 using Fiber-fed Extended Range Optical Spectrograph (FEROS) at the European Southern Observatory's La Silla Observatory in Chile. The first follow-up led to the collection of 36 radial velocity measurements taken between September 2009 and July 2010.

The team also used photometric data that had been passively collected by and publicly released into the archive of the SuperWASP collaboration, which had been observing the region where the star was located. In this data, HIP 13044 was found to oscillate; the signal was blocked roughly every sixteen days. Analysis of the SuperWASP and FEROS data led to the supposed discovery of the planet HIP 13044 b, although this claim was later refuted.

== Characteristics ==
HIP 13044 is an F-type star located approximately 701 parsecs (2,286 light years) from Earth in the Helmi stream—a group of low-metallicity stars moving with large velocities relative to the Sun. The star follows an eccentric galactic orbit, with a distance from the galactic center ranging from 7 to 16 kiloparsecs. The orbit does not lie in the galactic plane, and can reach distances as high as 13 kpc above it. This indicates that it once was part of a satellite galaxy of the Milky Way that was disrupted 6–9 billion years ago. The star itself is estimated to be at least nine billion years old.

HIP 13044 is fairly evolved star fusing helium in its core, and has therefore already passed the red-giant phase of its evolution. It lies near the blue end of the red horizontal branch bordering the instability strip. Its surface temperature is about 6025 K and its radius is approximately 6.7 solar radii. HIP 13044's mass is estimated to be 0.8 solar masses. Having a rotation period of 5–6 days, HIP 13044 is a fast-rotating star for its type. It is possible that this is because it has swallowed planets during its red-giant phase.

HIP 13044 has an apparent magnitude of 9.94 and cannot be seen with the unaided eye.

== Claims of a planetary system ==
In 2010, it was announced that a giant planet in a 16.2-day orbit had been discovered by the radial velocity measurements. This would have had implications for planet formation in metal-poor systems and survival of planets being engulfed by expanded giant stars. Subsequent analysis of the data revealed problems with the detection: for example an erroneous barycentric correction had been applied (the same error had also led to claims of planets around HIP 11952 that were subsequently refuted). After applying the corrections, there is no evidence for a planet orbiting the star.
