= Dynamical parallax =

Iterative technique to find the properties of the stars in a binary pair

In astronomy, the distance to a visual binary star may be estimated from the masses of its two components, the angular size of their orbit, and the period of their orbit about one another. A dynamical parallax is an (annual) parallax which is computed from such an estimated distance.

To calculate a dynamical parallax, the angular semi-major axis of the orbit of the stars is observed, as is their apparent brightness. By using Newton's generalisation of Kepler's Third Law, which states that the total mass of a binary system multiplied by the square of its orbital period is proportional to the cube of its semi-major axis, together with the mass–luminosity relation, the distance to the binary star can then be determined.

With this technique, the masses of the two stars in a binary system are estimated, usually as the mass of the Sun. Then, using Kepler's laws of celestial mechanics, the distance between the stars is calculated. Once this distance is found, their distance from the observer can be found via the arc subtended in the sky, giving a preliminary distance measurement. From this measurement and the apparent magnitudes of both stars, the luminosities can be found, and from the mass–luminosity relationship, the masses of each star. These masses are used to re-calculate the separation distance, and the process is repeated. The process is iterated many times, and accuracies within 5% can be achieved.

There is an unrelated method for determining the distance to some supernovae which is called “dynamical parallax”.

== See also ==
- Parallax in astronomy
- Photometric parallax method
- Spectroscopic parallax
