= PA-99-N2 =

Microlensing event in the constellation Andromeda

- Event type: Star
- Constellation: Andromeda
- Right ascension: 00^{h} 44^{m} 20.89^{s}
- Declination: +41° 28′ 44.6″
- Epoch: J2000
- Distance: 2,200,000 ly (670,000 pc)
- Other designations: PA 99-N2, MEGA-ML 7

PA-99-N2
Observation data Epoch J2000 Equinox ICRS
- Constellation: Andromeda
- Right ascension: 00^{h} 44^{m} 20.89^{s}
- Declination: +41° 28′ 44.6″

Astrometry
Distance	2,200,000 ly (670,000 pc)

Database references
SIMBAD	data

PA-99-N2 is a microlensing event detected in the direction of the Andromeda Galaxy in 1999.

== Explanations ==
One possibility for the event is that a star in the disk of M31 gravitationally lensed a red giant also in the disk. The lensing star would have a mass between 0.02 M_{☉} and 3.6 M_{☉} with the most likely value near 0.5 M_{☉}. In this case the lens profile makes it likely that the star has a planet.

== Possible exoplanet ==
The possible exoplanet would have a mass of 6.34 Jupiter mass. If confirmed, it would be the first exoplanet found in another galaxy. A similar event was seen in 1996 when a team of astronomers discovered an anomalous fluctuation in the Twin Quasar's lightcurve that seemed to be caused by a planet approximately three Earth masses in size in the quasar's lensing galaxy YGKOW G1. (However, the results remain speculative because the chance alignment that led to its discovery will never happen again; if that exoplanet could be confirmed, it would be the most distant known planet, 2.58 million ly away.)

The PA-99-N2 planetary system
Companion (in order from star)	Mass	Semimajor axis (AU)	Orbital period (days)	Eccentricity	Inclination (°)	Radius
b (unconfirmed)	6.34 M_{J}	—	—	—	—	—
