= Distance modulus =

Logarithmic distance scale

The distance modulus is a way of expressing distances that is often used in astronomy. It describes distances on a logarithmic scale based on the astronomical magnitude system.

== Definition ==
The distance modulus $\mu=m-M$ is the difference between the apparent magnitude $m$ (ideally, corrected from the effects of interstellar absorption) and the absolute magnitude $M$ of an astronomical object. It is related to the luminous distance $d$ in parsecs by:

$$\begin{align}
\log_{10}(d) &= 1 + \frac{\mu}{5} \\
\mu &= 5\log_{10}(d) - 5
\end{align}$$

This definition is convenient because the observed brightness of a light source is related to its distance by the inverse square law (a source twice as far away appears one quarter as bright) and because brightnesses are usually expressed not directly, but in magnitudes.

Absolute magnitude $M$ is defined as the apparent magnitude of an object when seen at a distance of 10 parsecs. If a light source has flux F(d) when observed from a distance of $d$ parsecs, and flux F(10) when observed from a distance of 10 parsecs, the inverse-square law is then written like:

$$F(d) = \frac{F(10)}{\left(\frac{d}{10}\right)^2}$$

The magnitudes and flux are related by:

$$\begin{align}
m &= -2.5 \log_{10} F(d) \\[1ex]
M &= -2.5 \log_{10} F(d=10)
\end{align}$$

Substituting and rearranging, we get:
$$\mu = m - M = 5 \log_{10}(d) - 5 =  5 \log_{10}\left(\frac{d}{10\,\mathrm{pc}}\right)$$
which means that the apparent magnitude is the absolute magnitude plus the distance modulus.

Isolating $d$ from the equation $5 \log_{10}(d) - 5 = \mu$, finds that the distance (or, the luminosity distance) in parsecs is given by
$$d = 10^{\frac{\mu}{5}+1}$$

The uncertainty in the distance in parsecs (δd) can be computed from the uncertainty in the distance modulus (δμ) using
$$\delta d = 0.2 \ln(10) 10^{0.2\mu+1} \delta\mu \approx 0.461 d \ \delta\mu$$
which is derived using standard error analysis.

== Different kinds of distance moduli ==
Distance is not the only quantity relevant in determining the difference between absolute and apparent magnitude. In the above, the two magnitudes correspond to bolometric ones, i.e. measured across all wavelengths. In reality, detectors are more sensitive in specific frequency ranges, where other factors, like calibration or absorption, could play an important role. Absorption may even be a dominant one in particular cases (e.g., in the direction of the Galactic Center). Thus, a distinction is made between distance moduli uncorrected for interstellar absorption, the values of which would overestimate distances if used naively, and absorption-corrected moduli.

The first ones are termed visual distance moduli and are denoted by ${(m - M)}_{v}$, while the second ones are called true distance moduli and denoted by ${(m - M)}_{0}$.

Visual distance moduli are computed by calculating the difference between the observed apparent magnitude and some theoretical estimate of the absolute magnitude. True distance moduli require a further theoretical step; that is, the estimation of the interstellar absorption coefficient.

== Usage ==
Distance moduli are most commonly used when expressing the distance to other galaxies in the relatively nearby universe. For example, the Large Magellanic Cloud (LMC) is at a distance modulus of 18.5, the Andromeda Galaxy's distance modulus is 24.4, and the galaxy NGC 4548 in the Virgo Cluster has a DM of 31.0. In the case of the LMC, this means that Supernova 1987A, with a peak apparent magnitude of 2.8, had an absolute magnitude of −15.7, which is low by supernova standards.

Using distance moduli makes computing magnitudes easy. As for instance, a solar type star (M= 5) in the Andromeda Galaxy (DM= 24.4) would have an apparent magnitude (m) of 5 + 24.4 = 29.4, so it would be barely visible for the Hubble Space Telescope which has a limiting magnitude of about 30. Since it is apparent magnitudes which are actually measured at a telescope, many discussions about distances in astronomy are really discussions about the putative or derived absolute magnitudes of the distant objects being observed.
