= 1410 Margret =

Asteroid

Discovery
- Discovered by: K. Reinmuth
- Discovery site: Heidelberg Obs.
- Discovery date: 8 January 1937

Designations
- Named after: Margret Braun (wife of Heinrich Vogt)
- Alternative designations: 1937 AL · A924 RD
- Minor planet category: main-belt · (outer); Eos

Orbital characteristics
- Epoch 4 September 2017 (JD 2458000.5)
- Uncertainty parameter 0
- Observation arc: 80.73 yr (29,485 days)
- Aphelion: 3.3373 AU
- Perihelion: 2.7030 AU
- Semi-major axis: 3.0202 AU
- Eccentricity: 0.1050
- Orbital period (sidereal): 5.25 yr (1,917 days)
- Mean anomaly: 209.01°
- Mean motion: 0° 11^{m} 16.08^{s} / day
- Inclination: 10.352°
- Longitude of ascending node: 170.92°
- Argument of perihelion: 233.32°

Physical characteristics
- Dimensions: 21.083±0.083 km
- Geometric albedo: 0.145±0.014
- Absolute magnitude (H): 11.1

1410 Margret, provisional designation 1937 AL, is an Eoan asteroid from the outer regions of the asteroid belt, approximately 21 kilometers in diameter. It was discovered on 8 January 1937, by astronomer Karl Reinmuth at the Heidelberg Observatory in southwest Germany. The asteroid was named after Margret Braun, wife of the Heidelberg astronomer Heinrich Vogt.

== Orbit and classification ==
Margret is a member of the Eos family (606), the largest asteroid family in the outer main belt consisting of nearly 10,000 asteroids.

It orbits the Sun at a distance of 2.7–3.3 AU once every 5 years and 3 months (1,917 days). Its orbit has an eccentricity of 0.11 and an inclination of 10° with respect to the ecliptic.

The body's observation arc begins with its first identification as A924 RD at Simeiz Observatory in September 1924, more than 12 years prior to its official discovery observation at Heidelberg.

== Physical characteristics ==
The asteroid's spectral type is unknown. The Eos family typically consists of K-type asteroids.

=== Diameter and albedo ===
According to the survey carried out by the NEOWISE mission of NASA's Wide-field Infrared Survey Explorer, Margret measures 21.083 kilometers in diameter and its surface has an albedo of 0.145, which agrees with the albedo of 0.14 measured for the parent body of the Eos family, 221 Eos.

=== Rotation period ===
As of 2017, no rotational lightcurve of Margret has been obtained from photometric observations. The asteroid's rotation period, spin axis and shape remain unknown.

== Naming ==
This minor planet was named after Margret Braun (died 1991), wife of the Heidelberg astronomer Heinrich Vogt (1890–1968), after whom 1439 Vogtia was named. The subsequently numbered asteroid 1411 Brauna is also named after Margret Braun. The official naming citation was mentioned in The Names of the Minor Planets by Paul Herget in 1955 (H 127).
