= 1466 Mündleria =

Carbonaceous asteroid

Discovery
- Discovered by: K. Reinmuth
- Discovery site: Heidelberg Obs.
- Discovery date: 31 May 1938

Designations
- Named after: Max Mündler (astronomer)
- Alternative designations: 1938 KA · 1950 UK; 1952 DF_{1} · 1963 DJ; A923 GA
- Minor planet category: main-belt · (inner)

Orbital characteristics
- Epoch 4 September 2017 (JD 2458000.5)
- Uncertainty parameter 0
- Observation arc: 93.91 yr (34,299 days)
- Aphelion: 2.7498 AU
- Perihelion: 2.0041 AU
- Semi-major axis: 2.3769 AU
- Eccentricity: 0.1569
- Orbital period (sidereal): 3.66 yr (1,339 days)
- Mean anomaly: 247.59°
- Mean motion: 0° 16^{m} 8.4^{s} / day
- Inclination: 13.147°
- Longitude of ascending node: 155.01°
- Argument of perihelion: 74.772°

Physical characteristics
- Dimensions: 21.46 km (derived); 22.131±0.052; 22.83±6.11 km 23.08±0.34 km 24.954 km (dated)
- Geometric albedo: 0.037±0.021; 0.0399±0.0030; 0.0554 (derived); 0.058±0.002; 0.061±0.012
- Spectral type: C
- Absolute magnitude (H): 11.90 · 12.1 · 12.40 · 12.53±0.29

1466 Mündleria, provisional designation 1938 KA, is a carbonaceous asteroid from the inner regions of the asteroid belt, approximately 22 kilometers in diameter.

It was discovered on 31 May 1938, by German astronomer Karl Reinmuth at Heidelberg Observatory in southern Germany, and later named after German astronomer Max Mündler.

== Orbit and classification ==
Mündleria orbits the Sun in the inner main-belt at a distance of 2.0–2.7 AU once every 3 years and 8 months (1,339 days). Its orbit has an eccentricity of 0.16 and an inclination of 13° with respect to the ecliptic. Mündleria's observation arc begins with its official discovery observation in 1938. It was first identified as 1923 GA at Heidelberg in 1923.

== Physical characteristics ==
The asteroid has been characterized as a carbonaceous C-type asteroid.

=== Diameter and albedo ===
According to the surveys carried out by the Japanese Akari satellite and NASA's Wide-field Infrared Survey Explorer with its subsequent NEOWISE mission, Mündleria measures between 22.13 and 24.95 kilometers in diameter, and its surface has an albedo between 0.037 and 0.061. The Collaborative Asteroid Lightcurve Link derives an albedo of 0.055 and a diameter of 21.46 kilometers with an absolute magnitude of 12.1.

=== Lightcurves ===
Photometric observations of asteroid 1466 Mundleria (e = 0.15, i = 13.15°, H = 12.23) were conducted using telescopes located in New Mexico, Italy, and Malta between March 24 and April 25, 2022. An analysis of these data points yielded a rotation period of 89.28 ± 0.065 hours.

== Naming ==
This minor planet was named after German astronomer Max Mündler (1876–1969), staff member at the Heidelberg-Königstuhl State Observatory where the body was discovered. The name was proposed by Heinrich Vogt after whom the minor planet 1439 Vogtia is named. The official naming citation was mentioned in The Names of the Minor Planets by Paul Herget in 1955 (H 131).
