= 1411 Brauna =

Main-belt asteroid

Discovery
- Discovered by: K. Reinmuth
- Discovery site: Heidelberg Obs.
- Discovery date: 8 January 1937

Designations
- Named after: Margret Braun (wife of Heinrich Vogt)
- Alternative designations: 1937 AM · 1929 RT
- Minor planet category: main-belt · (outer); Eos · background

Orbital characteristics
- Epoch 4 September 2017 (JD 2458000.5)
- Uncertainty parameter 0
- Observation arc: 80.32 yr (29,337 days)
- Aphelion: 3.1727 AU
- Perihelion: 2.8325 AU
- Semi-major axis: 3.0026 AU
- Eccentricity: 0.0567
- Orbital period (sidereal): 5.20 yr (1,900 days)
- Mean anomaly: 286.00°
- Mean motion: 0° 11^{m} 21.84^{s} / day
- Inclination: 8.0393°
- Longitude of ascending node: 284.60°
- Argument of perihelion: 94.642°

Physical characteristics
- Dimensions: 28.272±0.173 km 30.341±0.404 km 31.17 km (derived); 33.54±0.78 km
- Synodic rotation period: 4.90±0.01 h
- Geometric albedo: 0.070±0.004; 0.0793 (derived); 0.0844±0.0179; 0.096±0.008
- Spectral type: S (assumed)
- Absolute magnitude (H): 10.90 · 11.0 · 11.12±0.54

1411 Brauna, provisional designation 1937 AM, is a stony Eoan asteroid from the outer regions of the asteroid belt, approximately 31 kilometers in diameter. It was discovered on 8 January 1937, by German astronomer Karl Reinmuth at the Heidelberg-Königstuhl State Observatory in Germany. The asteroid was named after Margret Braun, wife of Heidelberg astronomer Heinrich Vogt.

== Orbit and classification ==
Brauna is a member the Eos family (606), one of the largest asteroid family in the main belt consisting of nearly 10,000 asteroids. The family's parent body is the asteroid 221 Eos. Brauna is, however, a non-family asteroid of the main belt's background population when applying the Hierarchical Clustering Method to its proper orbital elements.

It orbits the Sun in the outer main-belt at a distance of 2.8–3.2 AU once every 5 years and 2 months (1,900 days). Its orbit has an eccentricity of 0.06 and an inclination of 8° with respect to the ecliptic.

Brauna was first identified as 1929 RT at Simeiz Observatory in September 1929. The body's observation arc begins at the discovering Heidelberg Observatory, one month after its official discovery observation.

== Physical characteristics ==
Brauna is an assumed S-type asteroid.

=== Rotation period ===
In September 2007, photometric observations at the Oakley Observatory in Indiana, United States, were used to build a lightcurve for Brauna. The asteroid displayed a well-defined rotation period of 4.90 ± 0.01 hours and a brightness variation of 0.15 ± 0.05 in magnitude (U=3).

=== Diameter and albedo ===
According to the surveys carried out by the Japanese Akari satellite and the NEOWISE mission of NASA's Wide-field Infrared Survey Explorer, Brauna measures between 28.272 and 33.54 kilometers in diameter and its surface has an albedo between 0.070 and 0.096.

The Collaborative Asteroid Lightcurve Link derives an albedo of 0.0793 and a diameter of 31.17 kilometers based on an absolute magnitude of 10.9.

== Naming ==
This minor planet was named after Margret Braun (died 1991), wife of the Heidelberg astronomer Heinrich Vogt (1890–1968), after whom 1439 Vogtia was named. The previously numbered asteroid 1410 Margret was also named after Margret Braun. The official naming citation was mentioned in The Names of the Minor Planets by Paul Herget in 1955 (H 128).
