= Vogt–Russell theorem =

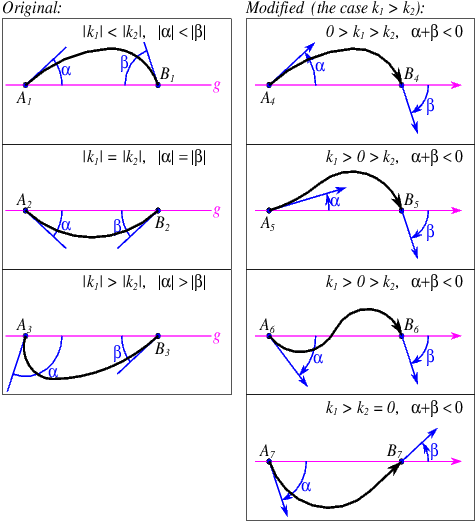
WIki, Illustration to Vogt's theorem.

Vogt–Russell theorem is a hypothesis in Stellar astrophysics stating that the structure of a star in hydrostatic and thermal equilibrium is determined solely by its total mass and chemical composition. The idea dates back to 1926 when Heinrich Vogt (astronomer) formulated the theorem with internal communications and seminars. Its first publication only appeared in 1931. Independently, Henry Norris Russell developed the same theorem in the early 1930s.

As numerical modelling techniques improved, researchers discovered that the relationship is not universal and that the equations of stellar structure can yield multiple solutions for the same set of global parameters. Thus, the “theorem” is treated today as a local approximation, valid mainly for main-sequence stars and under physical conditions without extreme effects.

== History ==
The original formulation of the principle attributed to Heinrich Vogt (astronomer) dates from 1926, but there is no publication from that year. The first formal exposition appears in his 1931 article in Astronomische Nachrichten, in which he discusses how the constitution of a star in hydrostatic and thermal equilibrium depends essentially on total mass and chemical composition.

Independently, Henry Norris Russell published in 1931 two technical articles in the Monthly Notices of the Royal Astronomical Society, analyzing how the internal Stellar structure and global parameters such as radius and luminosity are determined by these same two fundamental parameters, total mass and chemical composition.

Russell presented more detailed versions of these ideas in review articles on the Journal of the Royal Astronomical Society of Canada in 1933. These works consolidated the notion later called the “Vogt-Russell theorem,” despite not providing a mathematical proof of uniqueness.

== Formulation ==
The theorem states:

The internal structure of a star in hydrostatic and thermal equilibrium, including profiles of pressure, temperature, density, and luminosity, as well as its observable global parameters, radius and luminosity, would be uniquely determined by the total mass $M$ and the initial chemical composition $X_i$.

This formulation use the four fundamental equations of Stellar structure: hydrostatic equilibrium, mass conservation, energy transport, and energy conservation to construct the main proposition. If one assumes, sphericity, absence of significant rotation, absence of strong magnetic fields, and thermal equilibrium, the system is mathematically well-conditioned and, in principle, admits a single continuous solution that satisfies the boundary conditions at the center and at the surface.

== Modern interpretation ==
Numerical studies developed from the second half of the twentieth century onward showed that, under some conditions like near structural limits such as the Schönberg-Chandrasekhar limit, or in cases involving instabilities, multiple mathematical solutions may exist for the same values of $M$ and $X_i$. These solutions may include stable and unstable states, indicating that the originally postulated uniqueness is not universal.

For most stars under normal conditions like nondegenerate main-sequence stars, numerical solutions do indeed converge to a single stable solution. This explains:

- the narrow band occupied by stars with the same mass and composition in the Hertzsprung–Russell diagram;
- the good agreement with the Mass–luminosity relation;
- the good agreement of Stellar evolution models that use only $M$ and $X_i$ as initial parameters.

Thus, although the theorem is not strictly valid as a general law, it remains fundamental as a practical first approximation in stellar astrophysics.

== Limitations ==
The theorem fails when:

- the star is near structural limits (e.g., the Schönberg-Chandrasekhar limit);
- there is significant rapid rotation;
- strong magnetic fields influence energy transport;
- strong electron degeneracy is present;
- the star is not in thermal equilibrium.

In these regimes, multiple solutions arise, invalidating uniqueness.

== See also ==
- Stellar evolution
- Main sequence
- Hertzsprung-Russell diagram
- Mass-luminosity relation
