= EU Tauri =

Variable star in the constellation Taurus

Observation data Epoch J2000.0 Equinox J2000.0
- Constellation: Taurus
- Right ascension: 05^{h} 45^{m} 40.529^{s}
- Declination: +18° 39′ 24.82″
- Apparent magnitude (V): 7.90 to 8.25)

Characteristics
- Spectral type: G5
- B−V color index: 0.676±0.018
- Variable type: s-Cepheid

Astrometry
Radial velocity (R_{v})	−2.5±0.3 km/s
Proper motion (μ)	RA: 1.155 mas/yr Dec.: −2.455 mas/yr
Parallax (π)	0.8262±0.0233 mas
Distance	3,900 ± 100 ly (1,210 ± 30 pc)
Absolute magnitude (M_{V})	−2.77±0.15

Details
Mass	4.95±0.20 M_{☉}
Radius	30.23±1.43 R_{☉}
Luminosity	1,038±140 L_{☉}
Temperature	6,404 (6,185 to 6,626)‍ K
Metallicity [Fe/H]	−0.06 dex
Age	195 Myr

Other designations
- EU Tau, BD+18°955, HD 38321, HIP 27183, SAO 94837, PPM 121367

Database references
SIMBAD	data

EU Tauri is a variable star in the equatorial constellation of Taurus. With a brightness that cycles around an apparent visual magnitude of 8, it is too faint to be visible to the naked eye. The distance to this star is approximately 3,900 light years based on parallax measurements, but it is drifting closer with a radial velocity of −2.5 km/s. The position of this star near the ecliptic means it is subject to lunar occultations.

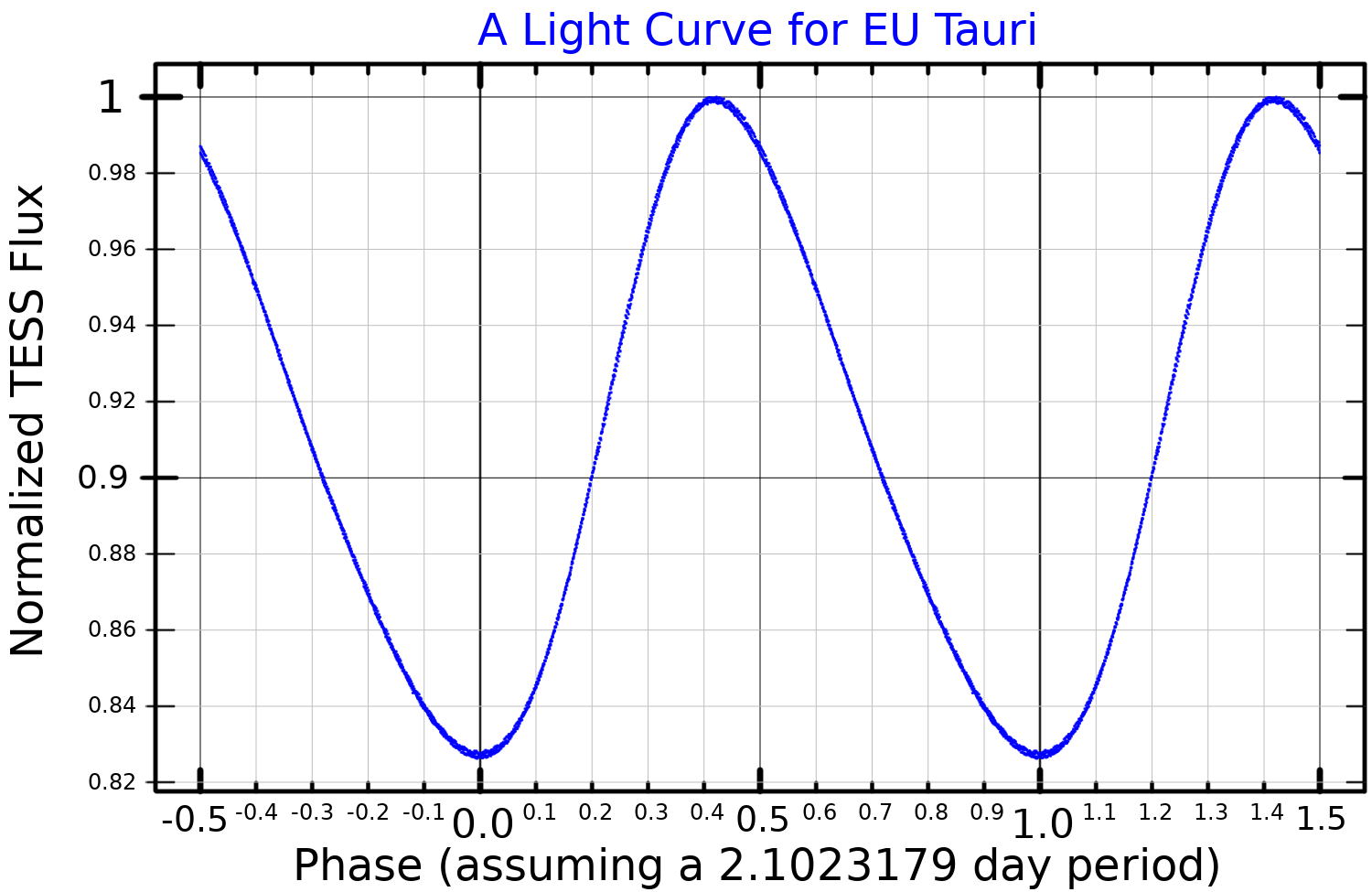
A light curve for EU Tauri, plotted from TESS data

The variability of this star was first reported by C. Hoffmeister in 1949, who later reported it as not variable. It was initially classified as an eclipsing binary of the W Ursae Majoris type by F. B. Wood and associates in 1963, based on observations by T. A. Azarnova in 1950–1951. Analysis of photoelectric data by E. F. Guinan in 1966 suggested this is instead a cepheid-type variable with a short pulsation period of about 2.105 days. He refined this period to 2.1051±0.0004 days in 1972.

A study of the light curve of this and other cepheids in 1981 showed it belongs to a small group with unusually short periods and distinctive behavior. This indicated that EU Tauri may be a "first overtone" pulsator. Gieren and J. M. Matthews in 1987 suggested that the star may instead have two pulsation periods, but this was later refuted. The evidence now mostly supports the idea that the pulsation of the star is in a "radial first overtone mode". The 1% radius variation during a pulsation cycle is relatively small for a star of this class. By 2007, scattered observations over a 35-year time frame indicated that the pulsation period of this s-Cepheid may have changed.
