= Swabia (disambiguation) =

Swabia (Schwabia, Latin: Suevia, Suebia) is a historical region in Southern Germany.

Swabia, Schwabia, Suebia, Suevia, or variation, may also refer to:

- 417 Suevia, a main-belt asteroid
- Alamannia in the early medieval period
- Bavarian Swabia, the administrative region (Regierungsbezirk) of Bavaria
- the homeland of the ancient Suebi
- The Kingdom of the Suebi
- The Duchy of Swabia in the high medieval period
- Swabian League of Cities, 14th century
- Swabian League, 15th century
- Swabian Circle, 16th century

== See also ==
- Swabian (disambiguation)
- Swabians
- Swabian German
- Swabi, city in Khyber Pakhtunkhwa
