= 1439 Vogtia =

Hildian asteroid

Discovery
- Discovered by: K. Reinmuth
- Discovery site: Heidelberg Obs.
- Discovery date: 11 October 1937

Designations
- Named after: Heinrich Vogt (astronomer)
- Alternative designations: 1937 TE · 1953 UJ; 1957 HP · 1964 FC
- Minor planet category: main-belt · Hilda

Orbital characteristics
- Epoch 16 February 2017 (JD 2457800.5)
- Uncertainty parameter 0
- Observation arc: 79.07 yr (28,882 days)
- Aphelion: 4.4750 AU
- Perihelion: 3.5307 AU
- Semi-major axis: 4.0028 AU
- Eccentricity: 0.1179
- Orbital period (sidereal): 8.01 yr (2,925 days)
- Mean anomaly: 250.93°
- Mean motion: 0° 7^{m} 23.16^{s} / day
- Inclination: 4.2034°
- Longitude of ascending node: 35.575°
- Argument of perihelion: 101.70°
- Jupiter MOID: 0.5988 AU

Physical characteristics
- Dimensions: 47.79 km (derived); 47.87±4.0 km (IRAS:3); 50.542±0.148 km 52.86±1.60 km
- Synodic rotation period: 12.898±0.006 h (Note: Warner (2016) web: rotation period 12.898±0.006 hours with a brightness amplitude of 0.33 mag. Summary figures at Collaborative Asteroid Lightcurve Link (CALL) for (1439) Vogtia) (Note: Center for Solar System Studies: lightcurve plot for (1439) Vogtia); 12.95 h
- Geometric albedo: 0.0425 (derived); 0.043±0.003; 0.046±0.007; 0.0509±0.010 (IRAS:3)
- Spectral type: B–V = 0.750; U–B = 0.320; Tholen = XFU · C/P · XFU
- Absolute magnitude (H): 10.45 · 10.65 · 10.85±0.36

1439 Vogtia, provisional designation 1937 TE, is a dark Hildian asteroid from the outermost region of the asteroid belt, approximately 48 kilometers in diameter. It was discovered on 11 October 1937, by German astronomer Karl Reinmuth at Heidelberg Observatory in southern Germany. It is named for astronomer Heinrich Vogt.

== Description ==
Vogtia is a member of the Hilda family, a large group of asteroids in an orbital resonance with the gas giant Jupiter, and thought to have originated from the Kuiper belt. It orbits the Sun at a distance of 3.5–4.5 AU once every 8.01 years (2,925 days). Its orbit has an eccentricity of 0.12 and an inclination of 4° with respect to the ecliptic. Its observation arc begins at Heidelberg, 15 days after its official discovery observation, with no precoveries taken, and no prior identifications made.

In the 1990s, a rotational light-curve of Vogtia was obtained during a survey of Hilda asteroids at Swedish, German and Italian observatories. It gave a well-defined rotation period of 12.95 hours with a brightness variation of 0.33 magnitude (U=3). In October 2016, American astronomer Brian D. Warner obtained another light-curve at his Palmer Divide Station/CS3 in Colorado, which gave a period of 12.898 hours and an identical amplitude of 0.33 magnitude (U=3).

In the Tholen taxonomy, Vogtia is classified as a rare XFU-type, while it is also described as a C/P-type asteroid. According to the surveys carried out by the Infrared Astronomical Satellite IRAS, the Japanese Akari satellite, and NASA's Wide-field Infrared Survey Explorer with its subsequent NEOWISE mission, Vogtia measures between 47.87 and 52.86 kilometers in diameter, and its surface has a low albedo between 0.043 and 0.051. The Collaborative Asteroid Lightcurve Link derives an albedo of 0.0425 and a diameter of 47.79 kilometers based on an absolute magnitude of 10.65.

This minor planet was named for Heinrich Vogt (1890–1968), German astronomer at University of Heidelberg. He discovered the main-belt asteroid 735 Marghanna in 1912, and was a known member of the Nazi paramilitary Sturmabteilung.
