= 402 Chloë =

Main-belt asteroid

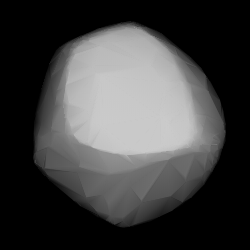
- Modelled shape of Chloë from its lightcurve

Discovery
- Discovered by: Auguste Charlois
- Discovery date: 21 March 1895

Designations
- Pronunciation: /ˈkloʊi/ KLOH-ee
- Named after: Χλόη Khloē
- Alternative designations: 1895 BW
- Minor planet category: Main belt
- Adjectives: Chloëan (/kloʊˈiːən/ kloh-EE-ən)

Orbital characteristics
- Epoch 31 July 2016 (JD 2457600.5)
- Uncertainty parameter 0
- Observation arc: 120.77 yr (44,113 d)
- Aphelion: 2.84302 AU (425.310 Gm)
- Perihelion: 2.27556 AU (340.419 Gm)
- Semi-major axis: 2.55929 AU (382.864 Gm)
- Eccentricity: 0.11086
- Orbital period (sidereal): 4.09 yr (1,495.5 d)
- Mean anomaly: 263.333°
- Mean motion: 0° 14^{m} 26.617^{s} / day
- Inclination: 11.8254°
- Longitude of ascending node: 129.415°
- Argument of perihelion: 17.6154°

Physical characteristics
- Dimensions: 54.21±2.5 km
- Synodic rotation period: 10.664 h (0.4443 d)
- Geometric albedo: 0.1483±0.015
- Spectral type: K
- Absolute magnitude (H): 9.02

402 Chloë (prov. designation: A895 FB or 1895 BW) is a large main-belt asteroid. It was discovered by French astronomer Auguste Charlois on 21 March 1895 from Nice. This asteroid is orbiting the Sun at a distance of 2.56 AU with a period of 4.09 years and an eccentricity of 0.11. The orbital plane is inclined at an angle of 11.8° to the plane of the ecliptic.

This asteroid spans a girth of approximately 54 km. It is classified as a K-type asteroid and is a Barbarian, which means it belongs to a class of asteroids of which 234 Barbara is the prototype. Analysis of the asteroid light curve, based on photometric data collected during 2009, show a rotation period of 10.664±0.001 h with a brightness variation of 0.30±0.01 in magnitude.
