= Jakob Karl Ernst Halm =

Jakob Karl Ernst Halm (1866 – 1944) was a pioneer of stellar dynamics and the first person to suggest the existence of a mass–luminosity relation for stars.

== Early life ==
Halm was born at Bingen am Rhein, Kingdom of Prussia on 30 November 1866.

== Education ==
Halm went to school in Bingen and studied later at Giessen, Berlin and Kiel. He obtained his PhD at Kiel in 1890 for work on linear differential equations.

== Career ==
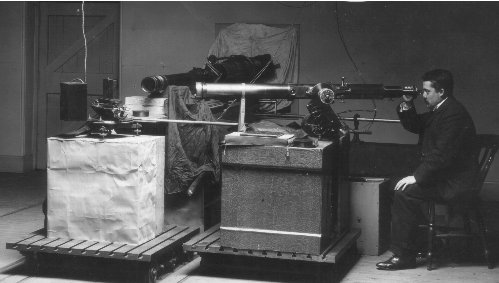
Halm making solar observations in Edinburgh ca 1905. SAAO Archives P6694

Assistant at the University Observatory, Strasbourg (1889-1895). First Class Assistant at the Royal Observatory Edinburgh (1895-1907). Chief Assistant at the Royal Observatory, Cape of Good Hope (1907-1927).

== Scientific contributions ==
While at Edinburgh Halm used a heliometer to feed a spectrograph in order to study the differential rotation of the Sun at different latitudes, he discovered that absorption lines near the edge of the Solar disc are displaced towards the red, compared with their positions at the centre. This was not due to obvious effects such as rotation. He also gave the first interpretation of what is now called a P Cygni profile while discussing the spectrum of Nova Persei 1901.

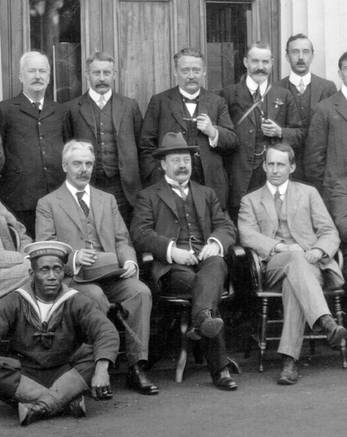
Visit of British Association group to Cape, in 1914. Halm is at back centre; Eddington at front, right. SAAO Archives (not yet catalogued)

While at the Royal Observatory, Cape of Good Hope, he was involved in follow-up work on the Cape Photographic Durchmusterung (CPD) of David Gill and Jacobus Kapteyn using radial velocities and proper motions. Repeated observations had already led to the discovery of two star streams by Kapteyn and Halm was able to identify a third (Halm 1911) associated with what he called "Orion-type" stars. This paper went on to say that motion of stars appeared to obey a Maxwellian distribution, implying equipartition of energy, i.e., the less massive ones moved more rapidly than the massive ones. His conclusion was based on stellar masses derived from a number of well-studied binaries. Eddington showed, however, that stellar interactions, owing to their rarity, could not produce this result. However, Halm's work was important in stimulating research on the subject.

The paper concluded that there is a relation between spectral type and mass for stars. This was the first announcement of the mass–luminosity relation, later elaborated by many others. His work on determination of magnitudes from photographic plates led him to an improved understanding of reciprocity failure, on which he published a paper, leading to the Kron–Halm catenary equation.

In 1917, Halm was the first person to make an estimate of the total to selective extinction of starlight. He determined that the interstellar extinction in magnitudes is a factor of 1.22 times greater in the blue than in the visible.

Halm believed that many terrestrial features could be explained by an ongoing expansion of the Earth's crust. Though it created considerable interest at the time, since the advent of plate tectonic theory his expansion hypothesis is no longer considered plausible.

== Death ==
He died 17 July 1944 in South Africa.
