= Swabian =

Swabian or Schwabian, or variation, may refer to:

- the German region of Swabia (German: "Schwaben")
- Swabian German, a dialect spoken in Baden-Württemberg in south-west Germany and adjoining areas (German:"Schwäbisch")
- Danube Swabian people of German origin from the German state of Baden-Württemberg living in Hungary, Croatia, Romania, Serbia
- Swabians, an ethnic group of Germany

== See also ==
- Swabia (disambiguation)
- Swabian Alb, a mountainous region within Swabia
- Duke of Swabia
- Swabian Circle
- Swabian League
- Swabian War
