= K-type asteroid =

Type of asteroid

K-type asteroids are relatively uncommon asteroids with a moderately reddish spectrum shortwards of 0.75 μm, and a slight bluish trend longwards of this. They have a low albedo. Their spectrum resembles that of CV and CO meteorites. A larger K type is 9 Metis.

These asteroids were described as "featureless" S-types in the Tholen classification. The K-type was proposed by J. F. Bell and colleagues in 1988 for bodies having a particularly shallow 1 μm absorption feature, and lacking the 2 μm absorption. These were found during studies of the Eos family of asteroids.

== See also ==
- Asteroid spectral types
- L-type asteroid
- S-type asteroid
- X-type asteroid
- 181 Eucharis
- 221 Eos
- 402 Chloë
- 417 Suevia
