= Frank Bradshaw Wood =

Frank Bradshaw "Brad" Wood FRAS (21 December 1915, Jackson, Tennessee – 10 December 1997, Gainesville, Florida) was an astronomer, specializing in photometry.

Wood graduated in 1936 with a bachelor's degree in physics from the University of Florida. He graduated in astronomy from Princeton University with an MA in 1940 and a PhD in 1941. His dissertation, published in 1946, was supervised by Raymond Smith Dugan for three years until Dugan's death in 1940 and then by Henry Norris Russell in 1940–1941. When the United States entered World War II, Wood enlisted in the US Navy, serving in the Pacific and reaching the rank of lieutenant commander. In 1945 he married Elizabeth H. Pepper. In 1946 he was a research assistant at Princeton University.

From 1947 to 1950 he was an assistant professor and assistant astronomer at the University of Arizona. At the University of Pennsylvania, Wood was associate professor and executive director of the observatories from 1950 to 1954 and full professor and director of the observatories from 1954 to 1968. He supervised the design and construction of Flower and Cook Observatory at a site about 29 kilometers west of the University of Pennsylvania and recruited faculty for modernizing and expanding the University of Pennsylvania's department of astronomy. He became an international leader in research on close binary stars. At the University of Florida, he was professor and director of the optical observatories from 1968 to 1989 when he retired as professor emeritus.

He was the author or co-author of nearly 100 publications. Among his doctoral students was the famous astrophysicist and science fiction writer Yoji Kondo. The International Astronomical Union dedicated to Professor Wood the book Algols — Proceedings of the 107th Colloquium (from the meeting held in August 1988 in Sidney, British Columbia).

He ... helped, in various ways, the development of an active observatory in the southern hemisphere, and encouraged amateurs in observing and publishing times of minima of eclipsing variables. He was also instrumental in promoting and supporting an automated photometric telescope at the South Pole, and thus, in 1968, he became a member of the Advisory Group on Polar Astronomy to the Committee of Polar Research of the US National Academy of Sciences, taking the first telescope to the South Pole in 1984 where he observed the brightest Wolf-Rayet star in the sky, γ2 Velorum, publishing the results in 1988.

Upon his death in 1997 he was survived by his widow, a son, and three daughters.
