= 735 Marghanna =

Main-belt asteroid

Discovery
- Discovered by: H. Vogt
- Discovery site: Heidelberg Obs.
- Discovery date: 9 December 1912

Designations
- Named after: Margarete Vogt and Hanna (discoverer's mother/relative)
- Alternative designations: A912 XD · 1952 OH; 1952 OJ · 1952 QA; 1952 QB · 1912 PY
- Minor planet category: main-belt^{+}(middle); background

Orbital characteristics
- Epoch 31 May 2020 (JD 2459000.5)
- Uncertainty parameter 0
- Observation arc: 107.38 yr (39,222 d)
- Aphelion: 3.6059 AU
- Perihelion: 1.8535 AU
- Semi-major axis: 2.7297 AU
- Eccentricity: 0.3210
- Orbital period (sidereal): 4.51 yr (1,647 d)
- Mean anomaly: 346.73°
- Mean motion: 0° 13^{m} 6.6^{s} / day
- Inclination: 16.866°
- Longitude of ascending node: 42.952°
- Argument of perihelion: 309.76°

Physical characteristics
- Mean diameter: 71.75±2.11 km (composite estimate) Individual estimates: 67.235±0.513 km; 74.32±1.6 km; 78.69±1.62 km
- Mass: (7.23±2.98)×10^{17} kg (composite estimate)
- Mean density: 3.74±1.58 g/cm^{3}
- Synodic rotation period: 20.625±0.011 h
- Geometric albedo: 0.043±0.002; 0.0484±0.0484; 0.059±0.007
- Spectral type: Tholen = C; SMASS = Ch; C (SDSS-MOC); B–V = 0.705±0.031; U–B = 0.318±0.021
- Absolute magnitude (H): 9.55; 9.7

735 Marghanna (prov. designation: A912 XD or 1912 PY) is a large carbonaceous background asteroid from the central regions of the asteroid belt, approximately 74 kilometers (46 miles) in diameter. It was discovered on 9 December 1912, by German astronomer Heinrich Vogt at the Heidelberg-Königstuhl State Observatory in southwest Germany. The dark C-type asteroid (Ch) has a rotation period of 20.6 hours and is rather regular in shape. It was named after Margarete Vogt and after Hanna, the mother and a relative of the discoverer, respectively.

== Orbit and classification ==
Marghanna is a non-family asteroid of the main belt's background population when applying the hierarchical clustering method to its proper orbital elements. It orbits the Sun in the central asteroid belt at a distance of 1.9–3.6 AU once every 4 years and 6 months (1,647 days; semi-major axis of 2.73 AU). Its orbit has an eccentricity of 0.32 and an inclination of 17° with respect to the ecliptic. The body's observation arc begins at Heidelberg Observatory on 29 November 1921, almost nine years after its official discovery observation.

== Naming ==
This minor planet was named by the discoverer Heinrich Vogt after his mother Margarete Vogt and after one of his relatives, Hanna. The naming citation was mentioned in The Names of the Minor Planets by Paul Herget in 1955 (H 74).

== Physical characteristics ==
In the Tholen classification and in the SDSS-based taxonomy, Marghanna is a common, carbonaceous C-type asteroid, while in the Bus–Binzel SMASS classification, it is a hydrated C-type (Ch).

=== Rotation period ===
In May 2011, a rotational lightcurve of Marghanna was obtained from photometric observations by American astronomer Brian Skiff and collaborators using telescopes at the Lowell Observatory in Flagstaff, Arizona. The 2019-revised lightcurve analysis gave a well-defined rotation period of (20.625±0.011) hours with a small brightness variation of (0.12±0.01) magnitude, indicative of a rather spherical shape (U=3). Lower rated measurements determined a period of 15.95 hours (Rafa Mohamed, 1995), 24 hours (Raymond Poncy, 2005) and 20.62±0.02 hours (Brian Skiff, 2014) with an amplitude of 0.11, 0.10 and 0.13 magnitude, respectively (U=2/1+/3−).

=== Diameter and albedo ===
According to the surveys carried out by the NEOWISE mission of NASA's Wide-field Infrared Survey Explorer (WISE), the Infrared Astronomical Satellite IRAS, and the Japanese Akari satellite, Marghanna measures (67.235±0.513), (74.32±1.6) and (78.69±1.62) kilometers in diameter and its surface has an albedo of (0.059±0.007), (0.0484±0.0484) and (0.043±0.002), respectively.

The Collaborative Asteroid Lightcurve Link derives an albedo of 0.0423 and a diameter of 74.23 kilometers based on an absolute magnitude of 9.7, while the Cornell Mid-IR Asteroid Spectroscopy (MIDAS) survey determined a diameter of (73±6) kilometers and Benoit Carry one of (71.75±2.11) kilometers. Alternative mean-diameters published by the WISE team include (57.25±26.07 km), (67.976±0.404 km), (70.640±1.230 km) and (87.951±34.60 km) with a corresponding albedo of (0.05±0.09), (0.059±0.007), (0.0536±0.0078) and (0.0275±0.0259).

Two asteroid occultations on 11 March 2008 and on 4 May 2010, gave a best-fit ellipse dimension of (81.6 km × 73.5 km) and (74.0 km × 64.0 km), respectively, each with an intermediate quality rating of 2. These timed observations are taken when the asteroid passes in front of a distant star.
