= 417 Suevia =

Main-belt asteroid

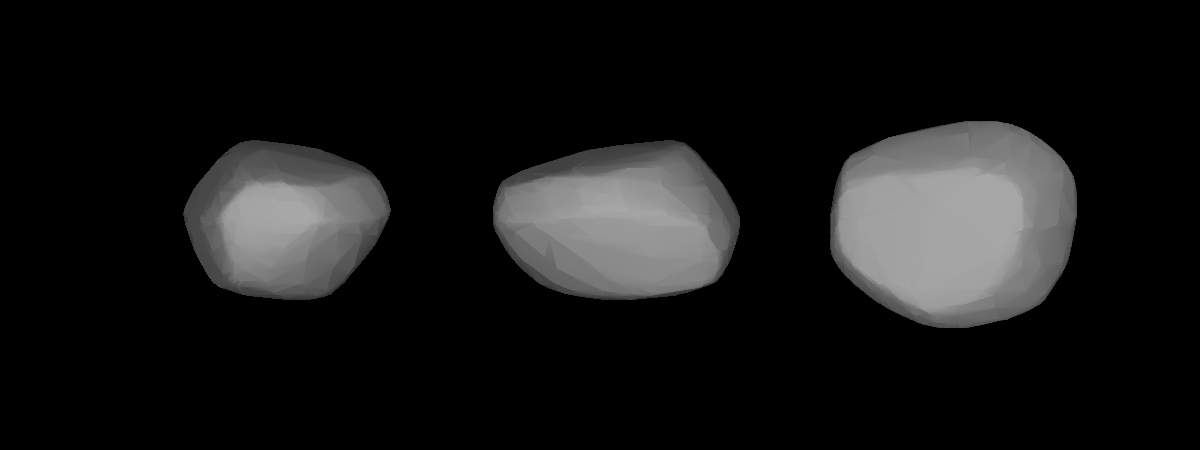
- A three-dimensional model of 417 Suevia based on its light curve

Discovery
- Discovered by: Max Wolf
- Discovery date: 6 May 1896

Designations
- Pronunciation: /ˈswiːviə/
- Alternative designations: 1896 CT
- Minor planet category: Main belt

Orbital characteristics
- Epoch 31 July 2016 (JD 2457600.5)
- Uncertainty parameter 0
- Observation arc: 119.74 yr (43736 d)
- Aphelion: 3.17751 AU (475.349 Gm)
- Perihelion: 2.42031 AU (362.073 Gm)
- Semi-major axis: 2.79891 AU (418.711 Gm)
- Eccentricity: 0.13527
- Orbital period (sidereal): 4.68 yr (1710.3 d)
- Mean anomaly: 263.971°
- Mean motion: 0° 12^{m} 37.746^{s} / day
- Inclination: 6.65003°
- Longitude of ascending node: 199.530°
- Argument of perihelion: 349.340°

Physical characteristics
- Dimensions: 40.69±1.9 km
- Synodic rotation period: 7.034 h (0.2931 d)
- Geometric albedo: 0.1960±0.020
- Spectral type: KS
- Absolute magnitude (H): 9.34

417 Suevia is a typical Main belt asteroid. It is classified as a K-type/S-type asteroid.

It was discovered by Max Wolf on 6 May 1896 in Heidelberg.
