= Mass–luminosity relation =

Equation in stellar astrophysics

In astrophysics, the mass–luminosity relation is an empirical and theoretical relationship between a star's mass and its luminosity The relationship is represented by the equation:
$$\frac{L}{L_{\odot}} = \left(\frac{M}{M_{\odot}}\right)^a$$
where L_{☉} and M_{☉} are the luminosity and mass of the Sun and 1 < a < 6. The value a = 3.5 is commonly used for main-sequence stars. This equation and the usual value of a = 3.5 only applies to main-sequence stars with masses 2M_{☉} < M < 55M_{☉} and does not apply to red giants or white dwarfs. As a star approaches the Eddington luminosity then a = 1.

== History ==
The mass-luminosity relation was originally a statistical relationship perhaps first noted by Jakob Karl Ernst Halm in 1911. Other early observers who determined some relation was Ejnar Hertzsprung in 1918 and by Adriaan van Maanen who showed that the relation was independent of the spectral type of the star. In 1924 Arthur Eddington showed that theoretical models for the internal processes in stars would produce the relationship in agreement with observational data.

== Advanced forms ==
The relation for stars with different ranges of mass are, to a good approximation, as the following:

$$\begin{align}
\frac{L}{L_{\odot}} &\approx 0.23\left(\frac{M}{M_{\odot}}\right)^{2.3}   & (M < 0.43M_{\odot}) \\
\frac{L}{L_{\odot}} &= \left(\frac{M}{M_{\odot}}\right)^4 &     (0.43M_{\odot} < M < 2M_{\odot}) \\
\frac{L}{L_{\odot}} &\approx 1.4\left(\frac{M}{M_{\odot}}\right)^{3.5}   & (2M_{\odot} < M < 55M_{\odot}) \\
\frac{L}{L_{\odot}} &\approx 32000 \frac{M}{M_{\odot}} & (M > 55M_{\odot})
\end{align}$$

For stars with masses less than 0.43M_{☉}, convection is the sole energy transport process, so the relation changes significantly. For stars with masses M > 55M_{☉} the relationship flattens out and becomes L ∝ M but in fact those stars don't last because they are unstable and quickly lose matter by intense solar winds. It can be shown this change is due to an increase in radiation pressure in massive stars. These equations are determined empirically by determining the mass of stars in binary systems to which the distance is known via standard parallax measurements or other techniques. After enough stars are plotted, stars will form a line on a logarithmic plot and slope of the line gives the proper value of a.

Another form, valid for K-type main-sequence stars, that avoids the discontinuity in the exponent has been given by Cuntz & Wang; it reads:
$$\frac{L}{L_{\odot}}  \approx \left(\frac{M}{M_{\odot}}\right)^{a(M)}   \qquad\qquad      (0.20M_{\odot} < M < 0.85M_{\odot})$$
with
$$a(M) = -141.7 \cdot M^4 + 232.4 \cdot M^3 - 129.1 \cdot M^2 + 33.29 \cdot M + 0.215$$
(M in M_{☉}). This relation is based on data by Mann and collaborators, who used moderate-resolution spectra of nearby late-K and M dwarfs with known parallaxes and interferometrically determined radii to refine their effective temperatures and luminosities. Those stars have also been used as a calibration sample for Kepler candidate objects. Besides avoiding the discontinuity in the exponent at M = 0.43M_{☉}, the relation also recovers a = 4.0 for M ≃ 0.85M_{☉}.

The mass/luminosity relation is important because it can be used to find the distance to binary systems which are too far for normal parallax measurements, using a technique called "dynamical parallax". In this technique, the masses of the two stars in a binary system are estimated, usually in terms of the mass of the Sun. Then, using Kepler's laws of celestial mechanics, the distance between the stars is calculated. Once this distance is found, the distance away can be found via the arc subtended in the sky, giving a preliminary distance measurement. From this measurement and the apparent magnitudes of both stars, the luminosities can be found, and by using the mass–luminosity relationship, the masses of each star. These masses are used to re-calculate the separation distance, and the process is repeated. The process is iterated many times, and accuracies as high as 5% can be achieved. The mass/luminosity relationship can also be used to determine the lifetime of stars by noting that lifetime is approximately proportional to M/L although one finds that more massive stars have shorter lifetimes than that which the M/L relationship predicts. A more sophisticated calculation factors in a star's loss of mass over time.

== Derivation ==
Deriving a theoretically exact mass/luminosity relation requires finding the energy generation equation and building a thermodynamic model of the inside of a star. However, the basic relation L ∝ M^{3} can be derived using some basic physics and simplifying assumptions. The first such derivation was performed by astrophysicist Arthur Eddington in 1924. The derivation showed that stars can be approximately modelled as ideal gases, which was a new, somewhat radical idea at the time. What follows is a somewhat more modern approach based on the same principles.

An important factor controlling the luminosity of a star (energy emitted per unit time) is the rate of energy dissipation through its bulk. Where there is no heat convection, this dissipation happens mainly by photons diffusing. By integrating Fick's first law over the surface of some radius r in the radiation zone (where there is negligible convection), we get the total outgoing energy flux which is equal to the luminosity by conservation of energy:
$$L = -4\pi\,r^2 D\frac{\partial u}{\partial r}$$
where D is the photons diffusion coefficient, and u is the energy density.

Note that this assumes that the star is not fully convective, and that all heat creating processes (nucleosynthesis) happen in the core, below the radiation zone. These two assumptions are not correct in red giants, which do not obey the usual mass-luminosity relation. Stars of low mass are also fully convective, hence do not obey the law.

Approximating the star by a black body, the energy density is related to the temperature by the Stefan–Boltzmann law:
$$u = \frac{4}{c} \, \sigma_B \, T^4$$
where
$$\sigma_B = \frac{2 \pi^5 k_B^4 }{15 c^2 h^3} = \frac{\pi^2 k_B^4}{60 \hbar^3 c^2}.$$
is the Stefan–Boltzmann constant, c is the speed of light, k_{B} is Boltzmann constant and $\hbar$ is the reduced Planck constant.

As in the theory of diffusion coefficient in gases, the diffusion coefficient D approximately satisfies:
$$D = \frac{1}{3}c\,\lambda$$
where λ is the photon mean free path.

Since matter is fully ionized in the star core (as well as where the temperature is of the same order of magnitude as inside the core), photons collide mainly with electrons, and so λ satisfies
$$\lambda = \frac{1}{n_e\sigma_{e\cdot\gamma}}$$
Here $n_e$ is the electron density and:
$$\sigma_{e\cdot\gamma} = \frac{8\pi}{3}\left(\frac{\alpha\hbar c}{m_ec^2}\right)^2$$
is the cross section for electron-photon scattering, equal to Thomson cross-section. α is the fine-structure constant and m_{e} the electron mass.

The average stellar electron density is related to the star mass M and radius R
$$\langle n_e \rangle = \frac{M}{m_n 4\pi R^3/3}$$

Finally, by the virial theorem, the total kinetic energy is equal to half the gravitational potential energy E_{G}, so if the average nuclei mass is m_{n}, then the average kinetic energy per nucleus satisfies:
$$\frac{3}{2}k_B T = \frac{1}{2}E_G\frac{m_n}{M} = C\frac{3}{10}\frac{G M m_n}{R}$$
where the temperature T is averaged over the star and C is a factor of order one related to the stellar structure and can be estimated from the star approximate polytropic index. Note that this does not hold for large enough stars, where the radiation pressure is larger than the gas pressure in the radiation zone, hence the relation between temperature, mass and radius is different, as elaborated below.

Wrapping up everything, we also take r to be equal to R up to a factor, and n_{e} at r is replaced by its stellar average up to a factor. The combined factor is approximately 1/15 for the sun, and we get:
$$\begin{align}
L &= -4\pi\,r^2 D\frac{\partial u}{\partial r} \approx 4\pi\,R^2 D\frac{u}{R} \\
L &\approx  \frac{1}{15}\frac{64\pi^2}{9}\frac {\sigma_B}{\sigma_{e\cdot\gamma}}\frac{R^4 T^4 m_n}{M} \\
& \approx  \frac{1}{15}\frac{2\pi^3}{9\cdot5^5}\frac {G^4\,m_e^2\,m_n^5}{\alpha^2\hbar^5}\,M^3 = 4\cdot {10^{26}}_W \,\left(\frac{M}{M_{\odot}}\right)^3 \\
\end{align}$$

The added factor is actually dependent on M, therefore the law has an approximate $M^{3.5}$ dependence.

== Distinguishing between small and large stellar masses ==
One may distinguish between the cases of small and large stellar masses by deriving the above results using radiation pressure. In this case, it is easier to use the optical opacity $\kappa$ and to consider the internal temperature T_{I} directly; more precisely, one can consider the average temperature in the radiation zone.

The consideration begins by noting the relation between the radiation pressure P_{rad} and luminosity. The gradient of radiation pressure is equal to the momentum transfer absorbed from the radiation, giving:
$$\frac{dP_{rad}}{dr} = -\frac {\kappa\rho}{c}\frac{L}{4\pi r^2},$$
where c is the velocity of light. Here, $1/\kappa\rho = l$; the photon mean free path.

The radiation pressure is related to the temperature by $P_{rad} = \frac{4\sigma}{3c}{T_I}^4$, therefore
$${T_I}^3\frac{dT_I}{dr} = -\frac {3\kappa\rho}{16\sigma}\frac{L}{4\pi r^2},$$
from which it follows directly that
$$L \varpropto {T_I}^4 \frac {R}{\rho}  \varpropto {T_I}^4  \frac {R^4}{M}.$$

In the radiation zone gravity is balanced by the pressure on the gas coming from both itself (approximated by ideal gas pressure) and from the radiation. For a small enough stellar mass the latter is negligible and one arrives at
$$T_I \varpropto \frac {M}{R}$$
as before. More precisely, since integration was done from 0 to R so $T_I-T_E$ on the left side, but the surface temperature T_{E} can be neglected with respect to the internal temperature T_{I}.

From this it follows directly that
$$L \varpropto M^3.$$

For a large enough stellar mass, the radiation pressure is larger than the gas pressure in the radiation zone. Plugging in the radiation pressure, instead of the ideal gas pressure used above, yields
$${T_I}^4\varpropto \frac{M^2}{R^4},$$
hence
$$L \varpropto M.$$

== Core and surface temperatures ==
To the first approximation, stars are black body radiators with a surface area of 4πR^{2}. Thus, from the Stefan–Boltzmann law, the luminosity is related to the surface temperature T_{S}, and through it to the color of the star, by
$$L = 4\pi R^2\sigma_B T_S^4$$
where σ_{B} is Stefan–Boltzmann constant, 5.67×10^{−8} W m^{−2} K^{−4}.

The luminosity is equal to the total energy produced by the star per unit time. Since this energy is produced by nucleosynthesis, usually in the star core (this is not true for red giants), the core temperature is related to the luminosity by the nucleosynthesis rate per unit volume:
$$L = \frac{dE}{dt} \approx  \epsilon \, \frac{4\pi}{3} R^3 \, n_A \, n_B  \, \frac{4\sqrt{2}}{\sqrt{3 m_R}}\, \sqrt{E_0(T)} \frac{S(E_0(T))}{kT} e^{-\frac{3E_0(T)}{kT}}$$
Here, ε is the total energy emitted in the chain reaction or reaction cycle. $E_0 = \left(\sqrt{E_G}\,kT/2\right)^{2/3}$ is the Gamow peak energy, dependent on E_{G}, the Gamow factor. Additionally, S(E)/E is the reaction cross section, n is number density, $m_R = m_A\cdot m_B/(m_A+m_B)$ is the reduced mass for the particle collision, and A,B are the two species participating in the limiting reaction (e.g. both stand for a proton in the proton-proton chain reaction, or A a proton and B an ^{14}_{7}N nucleus for the CNO cycle).

Since the radius R is itself a function of the temperature and the mass, one may solve this equation to get the core temperature.

== See also ==
- Mass-to-light ratio
