= Henry Norris Russell =

American astronomer (1877–1957)

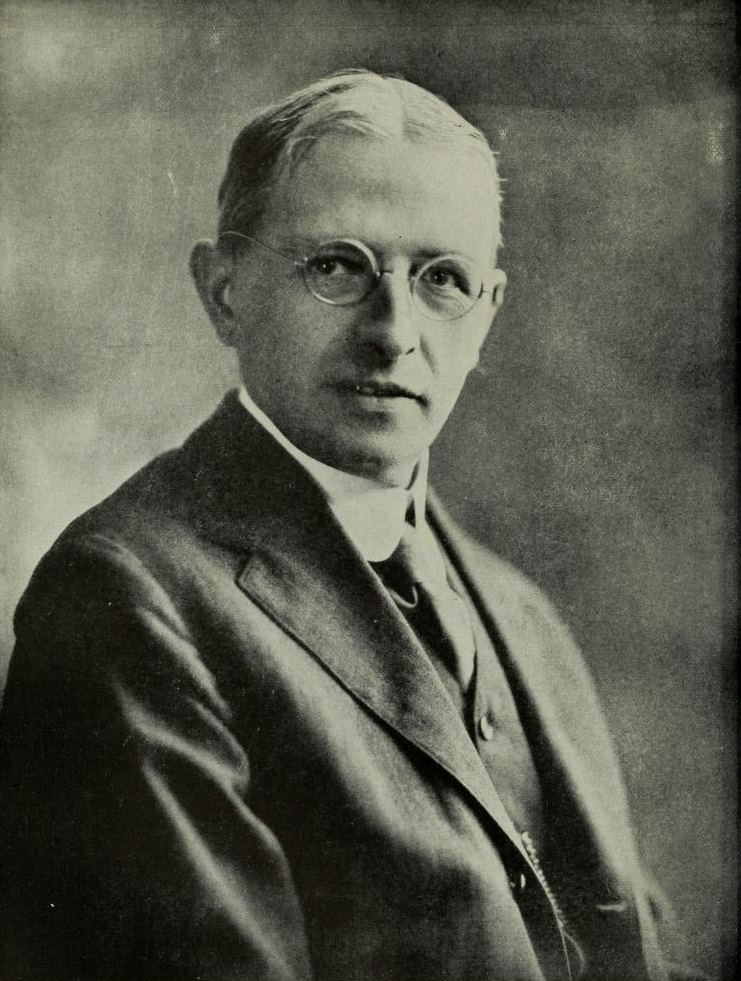
- Born: October 25, 1877; Oyster Bay, New York, U.S.
- Died: February 18, 1957 (aged 79); Princeton, New Jersey, U.S.
- Education: Princeton University
- Known for: Hertzsprung–Russell diagram; Russell–Saunders term symbol; Vogt–Russell theorem
- Awards: Gold Medal of the Royal Astronomical Society (1921); Henry Draper Medal (1922); Bruce Medal (1925); Janssen Medal (French Academy of Sciences) (1936); ForMemRS (1937)
- Scientific career
- Fields: Astronomy
- Workplaces: Princeton University
- Doctoral advisor: Charles Augustus Young
- Doctoral students: Harlow Shapley (1913); Donald Howard Menzel (1924); Lyman Spitzer (1938); Frank Bradshaw Wood (1941)

Henry Norris Russell ForMemRS HFRSE FRAS (October 25, 1877 – February 18, 1957) was an American astronomer who, along with Ejnar Hertzsprung, developed the Hertzsprung–Russell diagram (1910). In 1923, working with Frederick Saunders, he developed Russell–Saunders coupling, which is also known as LS coupling.

== Life ==
Russell was born on 25 October 1877, at Oyster Bay, New York, the son of Rev Alexander Gatherer Russell (1845-1911) and his wife, Eliza Hoxie Norris.

After graduating from Princeton Preparatory School in 1893, he studied astronomy at Princeton University, obtaining his B.A. in 1897 and his doctorate in 1900, studying under Charles Augustus Young. From 1903 to 1905, he worked at the Cambridge Observatory with Arthur Robert Hinks as a research assistant of the Carnegie Institution and came under the strong influence of George Darwin.

He returned to Princeton to become an instructor in astronomy (1905–1908), assistant professor (1908–1911), professor (1911–1927) and research professor (1927–1947). He was also the director of the Princeton University Observatory from 1912 to 1947 where Charlotte Moore Sitterly helped him measure and calculate the properties of stars.

He died in Princeton, New Jersey on 18 February 1957 at the age of 79. He is buried in Princeton Cemetery.

Russell at the Fourth Conference International Union for Cooperation in Solar Research at Mount Wilson Observatory, 1910

== Family ==
In November 1908 Russell married Lucy May Cole (1881-1968). They had four children. Their youngest daughter, Margaret Russell (1914-1999), married the astronomer Frank K. Edmondson in the 1930s.

== Published work ==
Russell co-wrote an influential two-volume textbook in 1927 with Raymond Smith Dugan and John Quincy Stewart: Astronomy: A Revision of Young’s Manual of Astronomy (Ginn & Co., Boston, 1926–27, 1938, 1945). This became the standard astronomy textbook for about two decades. There were two volumes: the first was The Solar System and the second was Astrophysics and Stellar Astronomy. The textbook popularized the idea that a star's properties (radius, surface temperature, luminosity, etc.) were largely determined by the star's mass and chemical composition, which became known as the Vogt–Russell theorem (including Heinrich Vogt who independently discovered the result). Since a star's chemical composition gradually changes with age (usually in a non-homogeneous fashion), stellar evolution results.

Russell dissuaded Cecilia Payne-Gaposchkin from concluding that the composition of the Sun is different from that of the Earth in her thesis, as it contradicted the accepted wisdom at the time. He realized she was correct four years later after deriving the same result by different means. In his paper Russell credited Payne with discovering that the Sun had a different chemical composition from Earth but never shared the rewards of the fame he readily accepted for her work which he’d failed to recognize until years later.

- Henry Norris Russell; Frederick Albert Saunders (1925). "New Regularities in the Spectra of the Alkaline Earths". Astrophysical Journal. 61: 38–69. Bibcode:1925ApJ....61...38R. doi:10.1086/142872.
- Henry Norris Russell; Raymond Smith Dugan; John Quincy Stewart (1945) [1926–27, 1938]. Astronomy: A Revision of Young's Manual of Astronomy; Vol. I: The Solar System; Vol. II: Astrophysics and Stellar Astronomy. Boston: Ginn & Co.
- Henry Norris Russell (1929). "On the Composition of the Sun's Atmosphere". Astrophysical Journal. 70: 11–82. Bibcode:1929ApJ....70...11R. doi:10.1086/143197.
- Henry Norris Russell (1937). "Model Stars (13th Josiah Willard Gibbs Lecture)". Bull. Amer. Math. Soc. 43 (2): 49–77. doi:10.1090/S0002-9904-1937-06492-5. MR 1563489.

== Awards and honors ==
- Member of the American Philosophical Society (1913)
- Member of the United States National Academy of Sciences (1918)
- Fellow of the American Academy of Arts and Sciences (1921)
- Gold Medal of the Royal Astronomical Society (1921)
- Lalande Prize (1922)
- Henry Draper Medal from the National Academy of Sciences (1922)
- Bruce Medal (1925)
- Rumford Prize (1925)
- Franklin Medal (1934)
- Janssen Medal from the French Academy of Sciences (1936)
- Foreign Member of the Royal Society (1937)
- Honorary Fellow of the Royal Society of Edinburgh (1938)
- Henry Norris Russell Lectureship (1946)
- Asteroid 1762 Russell
