= 221 Eos =

Asteroid in the Asteroid belt

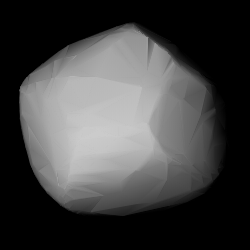
- 3D model based on lightcurve data

Discovery
- Discovered by: Johann Palisa
- Discovery date: 18 January 1882

Designations
- Pronunciation: /ˈiːɒs/
- Named after: Eos
- Alternative designations: A882 BA
- Minor planet category: Main belt (Eos)
- Adjectives: Eoan /iːˈoʊ.ən/

Orbital characteristics
- Epoch 31 July 2016 (JD 2457600.5)
- Uncertainty parameter 0
- Observation arc: 130.21 yr (47561 d)
- Aphelion: 3.3249 AU (497.40 Gm)
- Perihelion: 2.69594 AU (403.307 Gm)
- Semi-major axis: 3.01044 AU (450.355 Gm)
- Eccentricity: 0.10447
- Orbital period (sidereal): 5.22 yr (1907.8 d)
- Average orbital speed: 17.16 km/s
- Mean anomaly: 66.5202°
- Mean motion: 0° 11^{m} 19.284^{s} / day
- Inclination: 10.880°
- Longitude of ascending node: 141.845°
- Argument of perihelion: 193.56°

Physical characteristics
- Dimensions: 103.87±3.6 km
- Mass: (1.24±0.40)×10^{18} kg (Note: Calculated from its standard gravitational parameter GM = 0.083±0.027 km^{3}/s^{2}.)
- Mean density: 2.73 g/cm^{3} (Note: Assuming a diameter of 95.5 km.)
- Synodic rotation period: 10.443 h (0.4351 d)
- Geometric albedo: 0.1400±0.010
- Spectral type: K
- Absolute magnitude (H): 7.67

221 Eos is a large main-belt asteroid that was discovered by Austrian astronomer Johann Palisa on January 18, 1882, in Vienna. In 1884, it was named after Eos, the Greek goddess of the dawn, to honour the opening of a new observatory that was hoped to bring about a new dawn for Viennese astronomy.

The asteroid is orbiting the Sun with a semimajor axis of 3.01 AU, a period of 5.22 years, and an eccentricity of 0.1. The orbital plane is inclined by 10.9° to the plane of the ecliptic. It has a mean cross-section of 104 km, and is spinning with a rotation period of 10.4 hours. Based upon its spectral characteristics, this object is classified as a K-type asteroid. The orbital properties show it to be a member of the extensive Eos asteroid family, which is named after it. The spectral properties of the asteroid suggest it may have come from a partially differentiated parent body.
