= Heinrich Vogt (astronomer) =

German astronomer

- Born: October 5, 1890; Gau-Algesheim, Rhineland-Palatinate, Germany
- Died: January 23, 1968 (aged 77); Heidelberg, Germany
- Citizenship: German
- Education: University of Heidelberg
- Known for: Vogt-Russell theorem
- Spouse: Margarete Braun
- Scientific career
- Fields: Astronomy
- Workplaces: University of Jena, University of Heidelberg
- Doctoral advisor: Max Wolf

Heinrich Vogt (October 5, 1890 – January 23, 1968) was a German astronomer.

== Early life ==
Vogt was born on October 5, 1890, in Gau-Algesheim, Rhineland-Palatinate, Germany to Philipp Vogt, a farmer, and his wife Margaretha.

== Education ==
In 1911, after graduating from high school in Mainz, Vogt enrolled at the University of Heidelberg to study astronomy, mathematics, and physics, where he was under the tutelage of Max Wolf. His studies were interrupted due to World War I, but he continued his scientific career and earned a PhD in 1919 with a dissertation on the topic "On the theory of Algol variables". In 1921, he completed a Habilitation on "Photometric studies and brightness measurements in the cluster h and χ Persei".

== Work and academic appointments ==
In 1926, Vogt was appointed as an associate professor at the University of Heidelberg as well as the chief observer at Heidelberg State Observatory. In 1929 he was appointed as a full professor at the University of Jena as well as director of Jena Observatory.

In 1931, he became a member of the Nazi Party and rose to become a Politischer Leiter and the Nazi Party's liaison at the university. In 1933, he became a member of the Sturmabteilung, the paramilitary branch of the Nazi Party, and rose to the rank of Obersturmführer.

Vogt became a full professor at the University of Heidelberg in 1933, succeeding Max Wolf. From 1933 to 1945 he was the director of Heidelberg State Observatory.

In 1945 he was dismissed from his position as director of the observatory, but retained his professorship until his retirement in 1957. He increased his teaching activities and began to write popular books on astronomy and cosmology.

Heinrich Vogt and Henry Norris Russell independently discovered the Vogt–Russell theorem.

On 9 December 1912 Vogt discovered an asteroid, 735 Marghanna, which he named in honor of his mother. The minor planet 1439 Vogtia, discovered by astronomer Karl Wilhelm Reinmuth in 1937 was named after him.

== Personal life ==
Vogt married Margarete Braun and had a son and a daughter.
