= Bisei =

Bisei may refer to:

- Bisei, Okayama, a former town located in Oda District, Okayama Prefecture, Japan
  - Bisei Spaceguard Center in Bisei, Okayama
- 17286 Bisei, a minor planet
- Bisei Asteroid Tracking Telescope for Rapid Survey, a Japanese project to find asteroids
