= Kanzō Uchiyama =

Japanese Christian pacifist

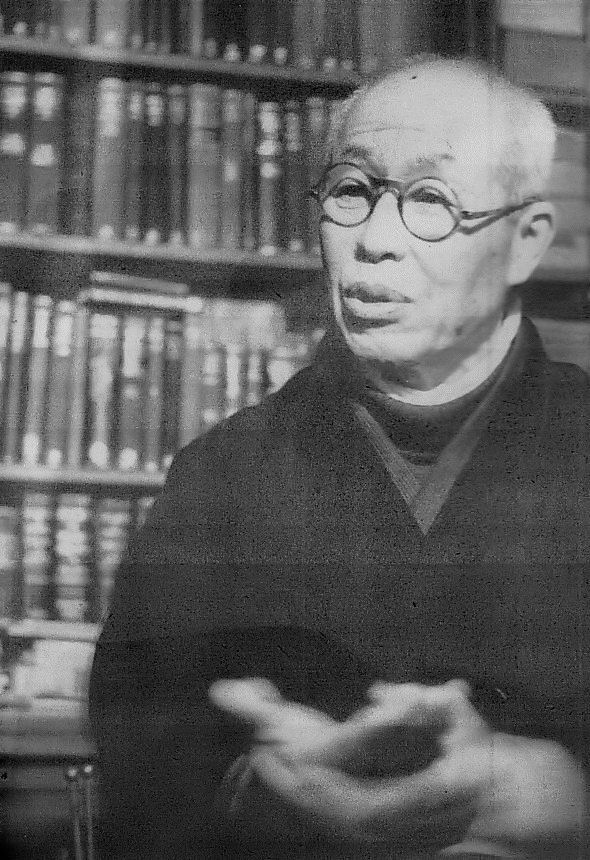
- Kanzō Uchiyama, 1953
- Born: January 11, 1885
- Died: September 21, 1959 (aged 74)
- Occupation: Proprietor of the Uchiyama Bookstore
- Known for: Frequent visitors from both Chinese and Japanese intellectuals before World War II Pioneer to Japan-China Friendship Honorable friend to Lu Xun
- Spouse: Inoue Mikiko (1893–1945) (m. 1916; died 1945) Kato Masano (m. 1950)

Kanzō Uchiyama (内山 完造, Uchiyama Kanzō; January 11, 1885 – September 21, 1959), also known with his Chinese name (鄔其山; Wū Qíshān), was the proprietor of the Uchiyama Bookstore, whose frequent visitors were both Chinese and Japanese intellectuals before World War II. Uchiyama was a Christian.

== Biography ==
=== Early life ===
Kanzō Uchiyama was born in 1885, in the village of Yoshii in Shitsuki District, Okayama. His father was the village headman and a member of the village assembly, while his mother also came from a scholarly family, and he was the oldest among four brothers and three sisters. During his school years, he was a rebellious student who often fought with his classmates and even teachers, and as a result was deemed a problem student by his father and the school and eventually dropped out.

At the age of 12, he was sent out for his apprenticeship to Osaka. To make a living, Uchiyama did many physically demanding jobs in Osaka, doing part-time work at factories and delivering goods for shops. In 1901, he went to work for a textile wholesaler in Kyoto and worked there for ten years.

At the age of 27, Uchiyama became a Christian. In 1912, Uchiyama first encountered Christianity. On January 31, with suggestions from Kotani Shōzaburō, a colleague of his, Uchiyama walked into Kyoto Church, where he met three people whom he came to see as role models. Uchiyama laid his foundation and faith for mission in Kyoto Church with connections to Niijima Jō, founder of Dōshisha University, who taught many graduates including Makino Toraji, a Pastor at Kyoto Church, who eventually became a life-long mentor of Uchiyama.

=== Early career ===
In 1913, Taguchi Kenkichi, a member of the church, the founder of Osaka-based pharmaceutical company Taguchi Santendō, later known as Daigaku Megusuri Santendo, asked Pastor Makino to find a member on a mission to sell Daigaku mekusuri (University Eye Medicine) in China. Uchiyama dislikes the environment where individuals have to lie in the Japanese business force at the time, thus with Pastor Makino's persuasion, Uchiyama, at age 28, set off for Shanghai on March 24, 1913. The third role model Uchiyama sees is Uchimura Kanzō, a pacifist who releases monthly Christian magazines.

Inoue Mikiko, aka Miki, was Uchiyama's first wife, also a member at Kyoto Church. Miki's father, an entertainer, became heavy in debt as a gambler. After Miki's sister passed, the debt is on her shoulders. With the debt on her shoulders, draws her to the Bible and Christianity. When Taguchi Kenkichi asks Pastor Makino to find a wife for Uchiyama, Pastor Makino introduces Miki. Miki and Uchiyama quickly drawn to each other for having tyrannical or abusive fathers, and does not have a childhood. They were engaged on February 9, 1915. The couple married on January 9, 1916.

=== Shanghai and the Uchiyama Bookstore ===
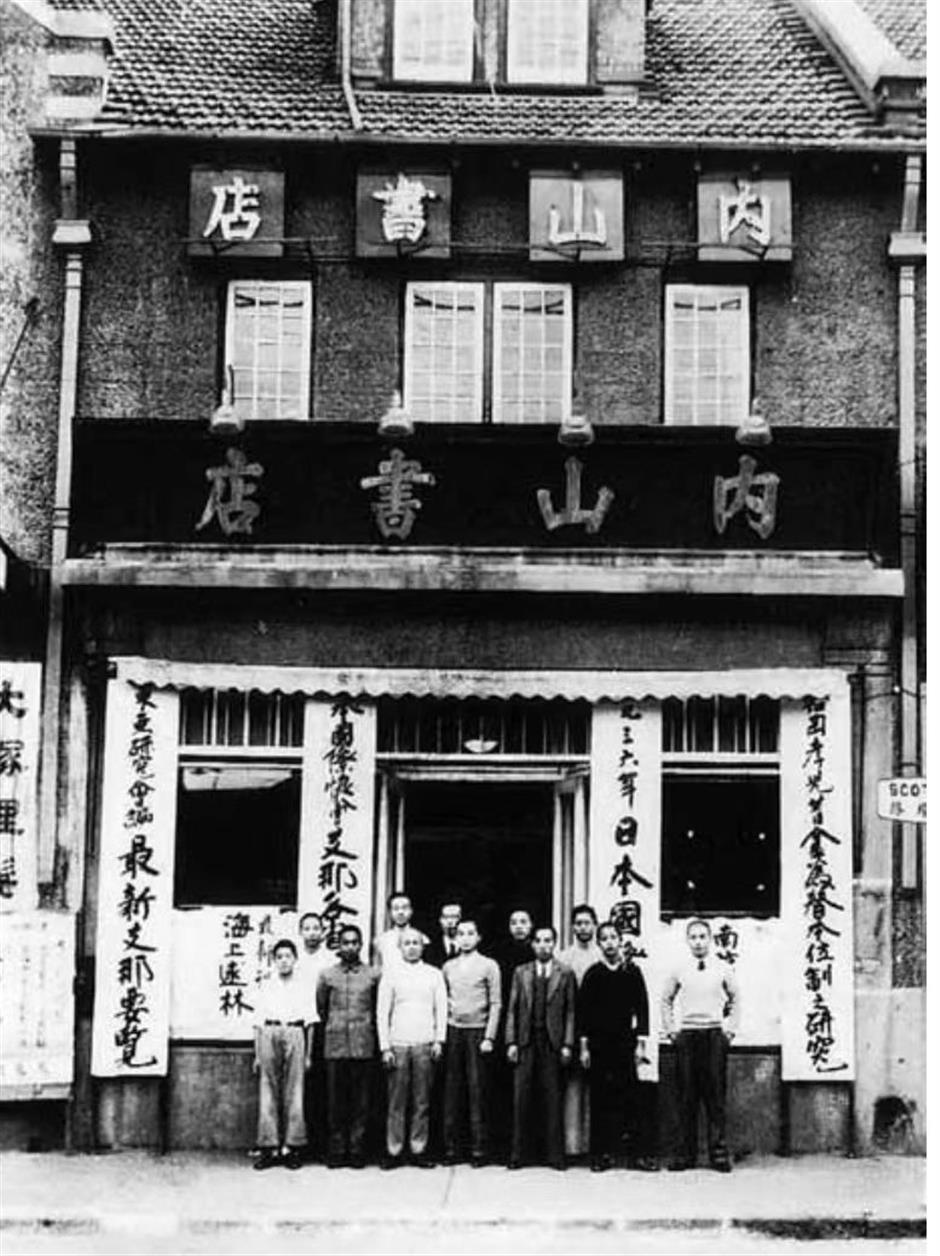
Uchiyama Bookstore on North Sichuan Road

Soon after getting married, Uchiyama and his wife returned to Shanghai from Japan for his work. Uchiyama's job required him to travel frequently between various cities in China, leaving his wife alone at their home in Shanghai, in a country whose language she did not know. Due to his upbringing, his wife wanted to contribute to the family and have an additional source of income. Moreover, Uchiyama did not want his wife to play the traditional role of a housewife merely. Therefore, the couple decided to open a Christian bookstore managed by Uchiyama's wife. They opened their Christian bookstore in their Shanghai home in Weishengli, Lane 1881, North Sichuan Road in 1917. The bookstore has size of eight-mat room, roughly 144 square feet, about the size of a single undergraduate's unadorned room; it had a tiny attached kitchen and a second floor with an eleven-mat room. This bookstore is nominal to Japanese people living in Shanghai at the time, for there were only three other Japanese-run Bookstore in Shanghai: Nihondō, Shinkōdō, and Shiseidō. Additionally there were no stores specifically carrying Christian books written in Japanese, so the Uchiyama Bookstore became popular among Japanese Christians residing in Shanghai. As word spread, Chinese and Koreans who read Japanese visited the store. The North Sichuan Road train line extends from downtown Shanghai to the International Settlement. In order to accommodate growing demand, in 1929, the bookstore moved to 2048 North Sichuan Road. Uchiyama even installed a telephone to take orders from all over China via the postal service. This location remained Uchiyama Bookstore and salon until Chinese government requisitioned it on October 23, 1945.

From 1923, Uchiyama's bookstore became a meeting place for Chinese and Japanese cultural figures, which Uchiyama named the "Mandan", and gradually developed into a meeting point for revolutionary forces. Uchiyama Shoten has not only been a platform for the growth of new culture in China, but has also contributed to the development of the Chinese and Japanese editing and publishing industries, and has become an important link for book publishing and cultural exchanges between the two countries.

=== Pioneers of Japan-China friendship ===
As a Christian, Uchiyama's worldview and behavior contrasted sharply with that of his fellow Japanese. Uchiyama's membership in the Christian community not only fulfilled his spiritual needs, but also facilitated cross-cultural exchanges and understanding between Chinese and Japanese people. This has played a positive role in bridging the friendship between the two peoples.

In the 1920s, thanks to Uchiyama's introductions, an increasing number of Japanese artists and intellectuals came to Shanghai. They interacted with Chinese literati, providing a platform for sharing information and fostering connections between Chinese students in Japan and Japanese writers traveling to Shanghai, all while cultivating profound friendships. Some of the notable individuals in this network included Tanizaki Junichirō, Kaneko Mitsuharu，Komaki Ōmi, Satomura Kinzō among others. These Chinese literati included Guo Moruo, Tian Han, Chen Baoyi, Feng Guangtao, Ouyang Yuqian, Yu Dafu, Wang Duqing, Cheng Fangwu and others. It is for this reason that Uchiyama Bookstore has become a fashionable venue for Sino-Japanese cultural exchanges in Shanghai, and has risen to become one of the most famous bookstores in Shanghai, gathering Chinese and Japanese scholars and writers.

=== Uchiyama and Lu Xun ===
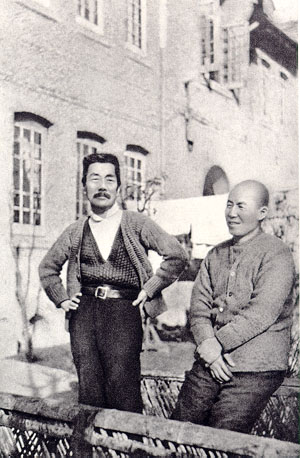
Lu Xun and Uchiyama in 1933

Uchiyama was a great and loyal friend to Lu Xun. Uchiyama met Lu Xun in 1927, Lu Xun has a distinctive term for Uchiyama, calls him laobe, meaning "boss/proprietor" in Shanghainese, laoban in standard Mandarin. Uchiyama respects Lu Xun as sensei, meaning "teacher" in Japanese. Both of them are concerned with Sino-Japanese relations, while Uchiyama much more than Lu Xun, for he utilizes the bookstore as a salon, a medium for promoting Japan-China Friendship. Fogel quotes "I am often tempted—but only tempted—to suggest that their friendship may have been based solely on Uchiyama's extraordinary help in protecting Lu Xun (and Xu Guangping and their child) on numerous occasions, even at the potential risk of his own life, and Lu Xun's equally extraordinary sense of gratitude."

After Lu Xun delivered his views after founding League of Left-Wing Writers, Zhejiang branch of the GMD issued an arrest warrant for him in late March 1930. Uchiyama and Miki helped Lu Xun's family to hide on the second floor of the Uchiyama Bookstore for a month. In May, Uchiyama moved Lu Xun's family to the second floor of the Ramos Apartments (now Chuanbei gongyu), as it would be unsafe for Lu Xun's family to live in a bookstore with Chinese customers come and go, not to neglect the fact of GMD spies. Uchiyama rented the flat under his name to protect Lu Xun. In January 1931, many of the young leftist and Communist writers were arrested by the GMD. Lu Xun was severe in danger. Uchiyama assisted to find Lu Xun's family a residence in Huayuanzhuang, an apartment belonged to Yoda Hōban, one of his Christian friends resided in Shanghai. This place was ideal for GMD less likely were able to arrest or assassin Lu Xun in foreign owned places. A month or two later in February or March, Lu Xun wrote a poem simply named "Zeng Wuqishan" (A Poem Presented to Uchiyama) to thank Uchiyama's help being such an honest and helpful friend.

By 1932, Uchiyama had become the sole publisher of Lu Xun's works. By April 1933, Lu Xun's family moved to Scott Road, just blocks away from Uchiyama Bookstore, with expenses all under the bookstore. This is the place Lu Xun spent his last three years of life, and this location eventually became the residence to Lu Xun Memorial Museum. After Lu Xun's death in 1936, Uchiyama did not give up on the publication of Lu Xun's writings and compilations. It was Uchiyama's dedication that earned him the prestigious status of "administrator of Lu Xun's legacy" in the cultural circles of both China and Japan. To this day, Mr. Uchiyama's name, "Friend of Lu Xun," is still remembered. Uchiyama's efforts to disseminate and protect Lu Xun's writings have resulted in a remarkable friendship.

=== Later years ===
Uchiyama celebrated thirtieth wedding anniversary with wife Miki on January 9, 1945. Uchiyama celebrated his 60th birthday on the 11th, his kanreki, meaning to start life again at 60 in Japanese. Miki died just 2 days later on the 13th. Uchiyama felt grieve and ponder through the next phase of his life. Seeing his friend in grief, Tsukamoto Suketarō, one of his close friends, suggested Uchiyama build a double grave so that he and Miki would be buried together. Uchiyama had epitaph inscribed. After Japan's surrender in August, Uchiyama Bookstore remained open until October 23, 1945. Uchiyama deported back to Japan in 1947. After the war, he became the first head of the Japan China Friendship Association.

After WWII, Japan was defeated. The Chinese government immediately nationalized Uchiyama's bookstore and deported Uchiyama himself. Uchiyama had to return to Tokyo, Japan, where he began a new life. He worked for a while at the Tokyo branch of Uchiyama Shoten and continued to promote friendly relations between China and Japan through the publication of the magazine "Mandan".

The Japan-China Friendship Association (JCFA) established on October 1, 1950, in Tokyo. He was the first Chairman of the association. He also was the founding member of the Japan-China Trade Promotion Association. The same year, Uchiyama married Kato Masano from Moji, a port city connected with Nagasaki. Masano is Miki's friend, they were former women of the entertainment district. After their marriage, Uchiyama and Masano moved in Kyōdō kita area of Tokyo's Setagaya ward. They join the United Church of Christ near their home, with Murata Masasuke, Uchiyama's old friend in Shangha,i being the Pastor.

During the period from 1949 to 1972, Uchiyama, as a director of the JCFA, visited China many times to communicate with Chinese intellectuals despite the fact that China and Japan had not yet established formal diplomatic relations. Under the very sensitive and complicated environment of the relationship between the two countries, Uchiyama, despite all the difficulties and obstacles, actively promoted cultural exchanges and friendly exchanges between Chinese and Japanese people. Uchiyama often hosted visitors from China in JCFA, including Li Dequan, Liao Chengzhi, Guo Moruo, and Xu Guangping.

=== Death and burial ===
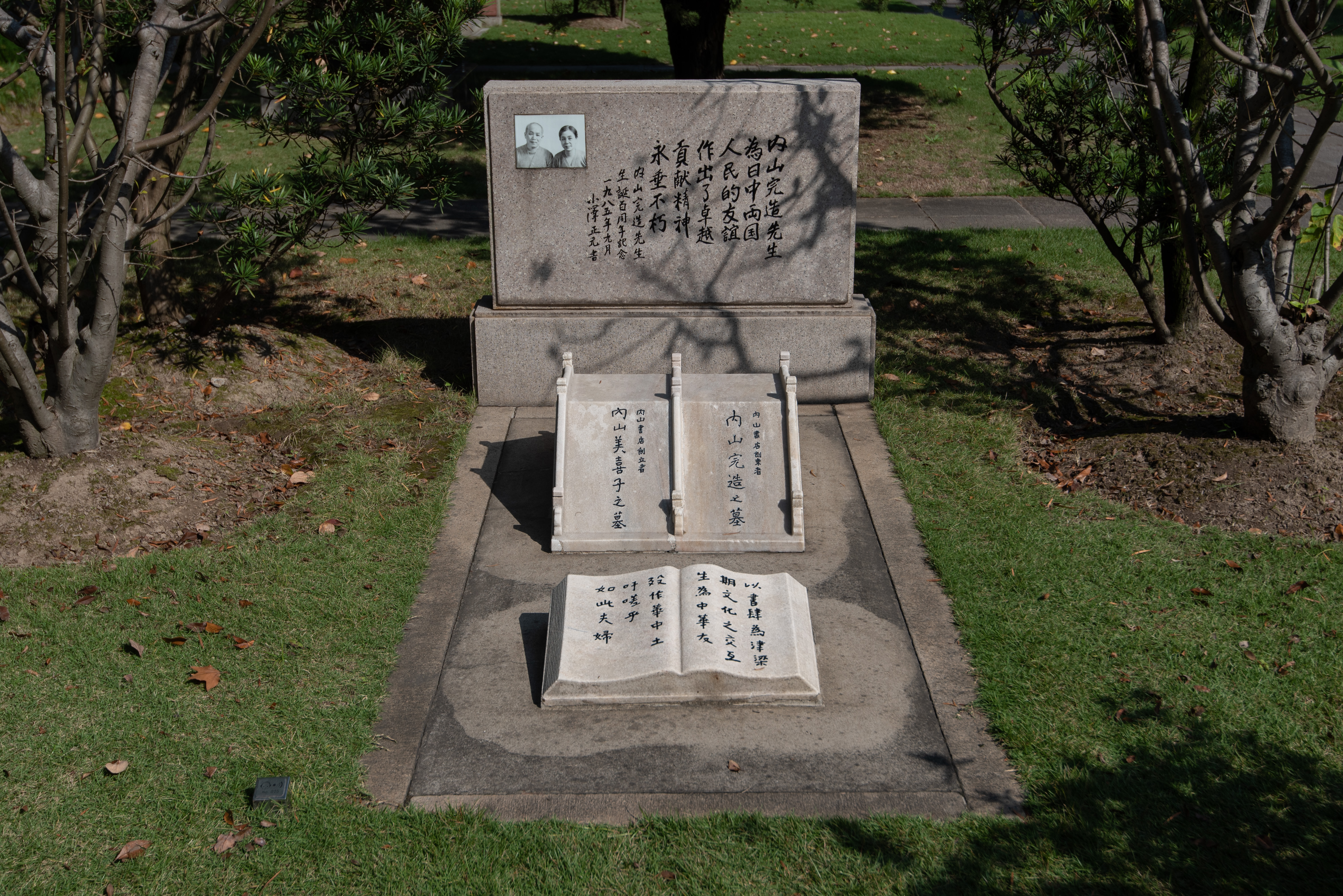
Double Grave of Kanzō Uchiyama and his wife Miki, with his epitaph inscript on there

On September 21, 1959, Kanzō Uchiyama died in Beijing. He is buried in the Shanghai Wanguo Cemetery. At his funeral, attendees included Ouyang Yuqian, and others, among whom Tian Han was also present.

=== Notable works ===
- "Thirty Years" 1947
- Friends with the Same Blood Running Through (Onaji chi no nagare no tomo yo) 1948
- China's Past and Present (Heikin yūsen: Chūgoku no konjaku) 1955
- Recollections from the Past (Kakōroku)

== See also ==
- China–Japan relations
