= Miura clan =

Japanese clan

Miura 三浦
- Miura clan mon
- Parent house: Taira clan
- Final ruler: Miura Yoshimoto
- Ruled until: 1516, Siege of Arai
- Cadet branches: Ashina clan

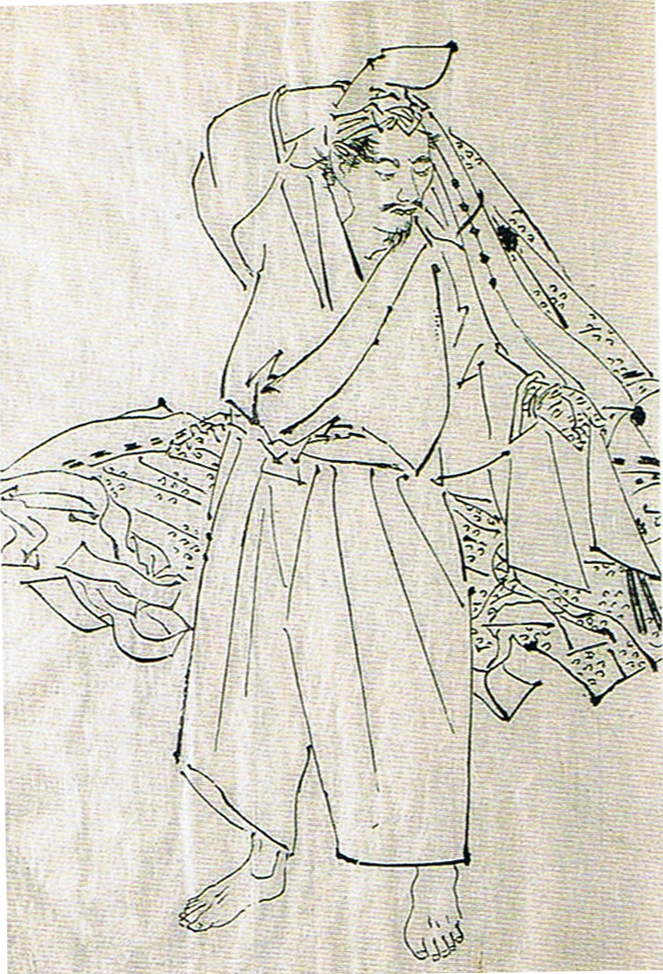
Miura Yoshizumi in an image from the Bakumatsu period

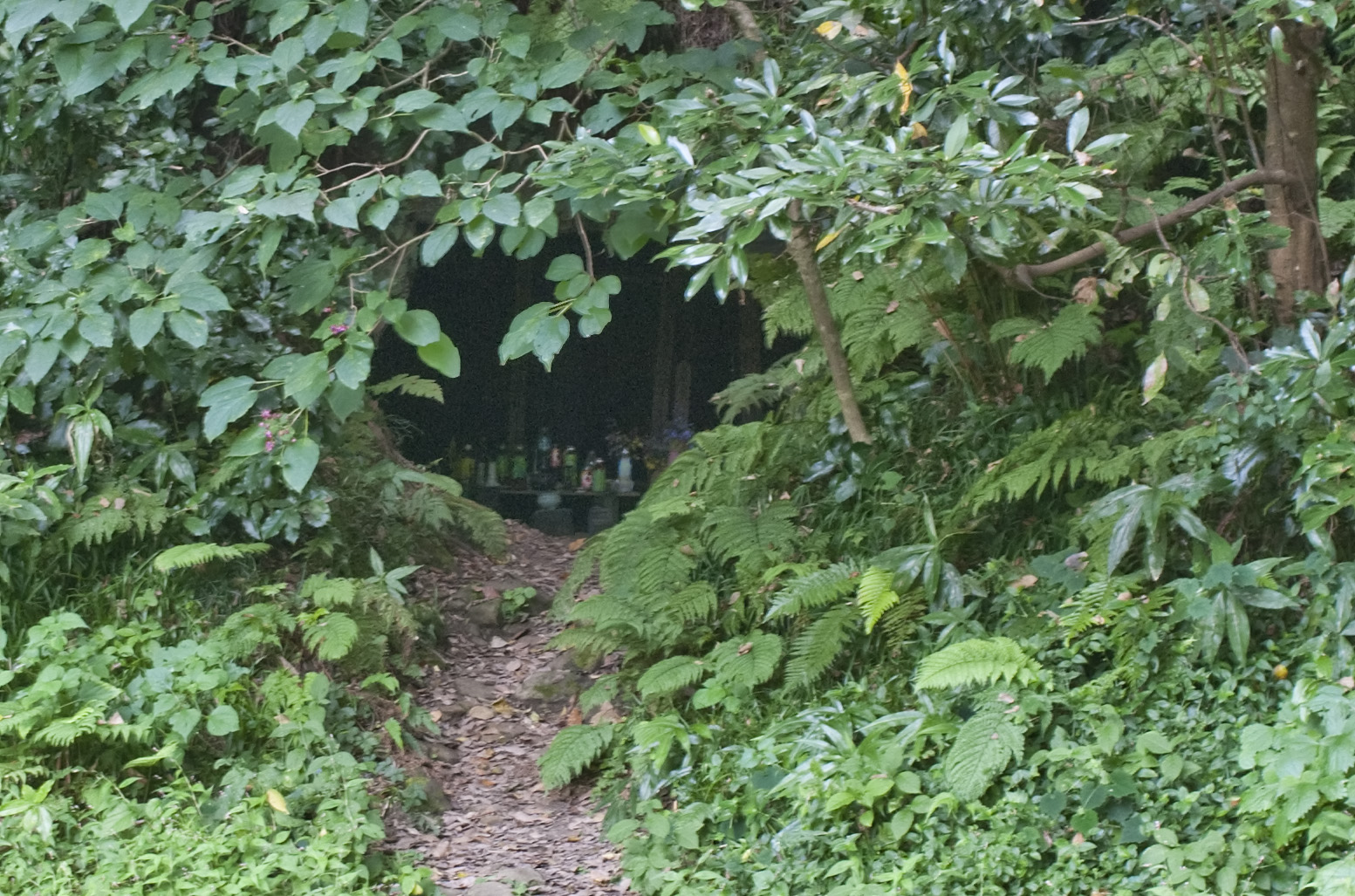
Yagura of the Miura Clan in Kamakura. Sotoba and gifts are visible

The Miura family (三浦氏, Miura-shi) was one of the branch families descended from the Taira clan. They held large fiefs, and retained great political influence. They were one of the primary opponents of the Hōjō family of regents in the mid-13th century, and again at the beginning of the 16th. Miura remains a common family name in Japan today.

The Miura clan supported Minamoto no Yoritomo in the foundation of the Kamakura shogunate, but were later annihilated by Hōjō Tokiyori in 1247. However, the family name was reassigned to a supporter of the Hōjō clan, and the Miura continued to rule Miura Peninsula through the Muromachi period until their defeat at Arai Castle in a 1516 attack by Hōjō Sōun.

== Members of the Miura clan ==
- Miura Yasumura – member of Council of State, and signer of Jōei Formulary
- Miura Yoshiaki – grandfather to Minamoto no Yoshihira
- Miura Yoshizumi – ally to Minamoto no Yoshitsune at the Battle of Dan-no-ura, 1185
- Miura Yoshimura – a Minamoto ally during the Jōkyū War of 1221
- Miura Yoshiatsu - his son was Miura Yoshimoto, who committed suicide during the Siege of Arai
- Miura Yoshimoto – the son of Miura Yoshiatsu. Both are said to have committed seppuku in 1516 when the Arai castle was stormed, with Yoshimoto decapitating himself.
- Miura Tsunesaburō - a rookie of Shinsengumi. Being new and did not comprehend Kondō Isami's wish, he killed former captain Tōdō Heisuke.

'Miura' was also the family name given to English sailor William Adams, who became shipwrecked in Japan in the year 1600.

== See also ==
- Japanese clans
- Miura Peninsula
- Kanto region
