= Hirakushi Denchū =

Japanese sculptor

Denchū Hirakushi 平櫛田中
- 平櫛田中
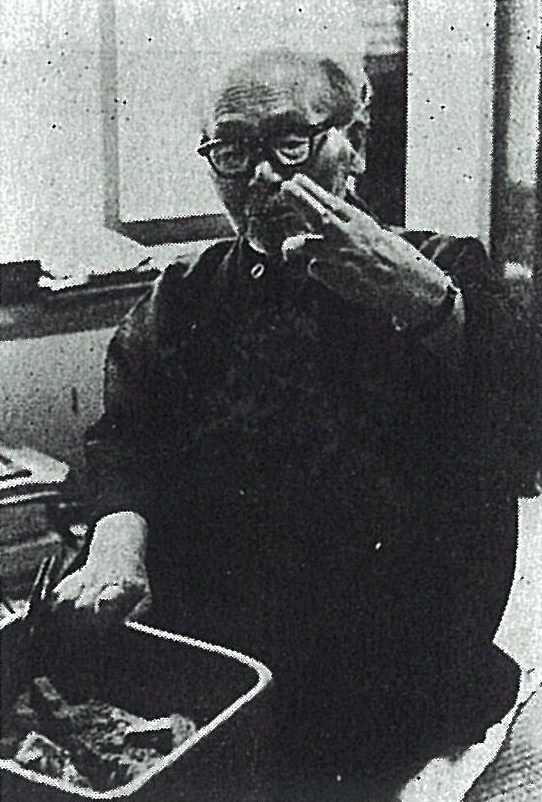
- Born: Tanaka Denchū; February 23, 1872; Shitsuki, Okayama, Japan
- Died: December 30, 1979 (aged 107); Tokyo, Japan
- Resting place: Tama Cemetery, Fuchū, Tokyo
- Awards: Person of Cultural Merit (1954), Order of Cultural Merit (1962)

Hirakushi Denchū or Hiragushi Denchū (平櫛田中, Denchū Hirakushi; February 2, 1872 – December 30, 1979) was a Japanese sculptor. He was noted for his traditional Japanese wood sculptures, especially realistically rendered painted wooden portrait sculptures, often incorporating Buddhist themes. He was appointed to the Imperial Art Academy in 1937 and in 1944 was appointed an Imperial Household Artist. He was named a Person of Cultural Merit in 1954 and in 1962 was awarded the Order of Cultural Merit.

His carving of a pair of dragon gods can be found in the rear alcoves of Kaminarimon Gate at the entrance to Tokyo's Sensō-ji Temple, installed in 1978 on the 1,350th anniversary of the Kannon's first appearance in Asakusa.

== Biography ==
Denchū was born in Shitsuki (now part of Ibara) in Okayama Prefecture, Japan in 1872, under the name Tanaka. In 1882, he was adopted by Hirakushi family of Numakuma in Hiroshima Prefecture and took on the new name. He began his career as an artist in 1893, starting as an apprentice to woodcarver Nakaya Seiko, who carved puppets for bunraku puppet dramas in Osaka. In 1897, he moved to Tokyo and studied under artist Kōun Takamura (sculptor of the 1898 bronze statue of Saigō Takamori which stands in Ueno Park in Tokyo). In 1907, Denchu and three other sculptors established the Nihon Chōkoku Kai (Japan Sculpture Society), and he submitted his 1908 wood sculpture Katsujinsen ("The life-bearing arrow") to its first exhibition, winning the attention of the influential art scholar Okakura Tenshin.

One of Denchu's best-known works is the 238 centimetres (7.81 ft)-tall statue Tenshō (Reincarnation) of 1920. The statue depicts a wrathful figure with a halo of flames – perhaps the Buddhist deity Fudô-myôô – as it vomits out a tiny human figure. "Old Mother of Heian" is also known as his work. According to Penelope Mason's History of Japanese Art:

[t]he tiny human is clearly a loathsome wretch at best – possibly so unpalatable that even a demon would not eat him – unworthy of release from the cycle of death and rebirth, the ultimate goal of Buddhist practice. Whatever the exact identification, the image's expression of divine disgust at the human condition is patently clear. Using traditional materials and fusing classic Buddhist themes, Hiragushi has succeeded in creating a powerful and modern statement.

Denchū died on December 30, 1979, and is buried at Tama Cemetery in Fuchū in western Tokyo.

There are two museums dedicated to his work:

- The Ibara Municipal Denchu Art Museum (井原市立田中美術館)] in Ibara, Okayama Prefecture in western Japan, the place of his birth. The museum also maintains a memorial garden to Denchū in Ibara and his old home in Tokyo's Asakusa district.
- The Kodaira Hirakushi Denchu Art Museum (小平市平櫛田中彫刻美術館) in Kodaira in western Tokyo, which preserves his last home and studio.

== See also ==
- Yasuo Mizui
- Tokyo University of the Arts
