= Yoshii, Okayama =

Yoshii, Okayama may refer to:

- Yoshii, Okayama (Akaiwa), Japan
- Yoshii, Okayama (Shitsuki), Japan
