= Bitchū Province =

Former province of Japan

Map of Japanese provinces (1868) with Bitchū Province highlighted

Bitchū Province (備中国, Bitchū no Kuni; Japanese pronunciation: [bíc̟̚.c̟͡ɕɨ̀ɨ̀ (nò̞ kɯ̈̀.ɲ̟ì), bìc̟̚.c̟͡ɕɨ́ɨ̀ (nò̞ kɯ̈̀.ɲ̟ì)]) was a province of Japan on the Inland Sea side of western Honshū, in what is today western Okayama Prefecture. It was sometimes called Bishū (備州), with Bizen and Bingo Provinces; those three provinces were settled in the late 7th Century, dividing former Kibi Province. Bitchu bordered Hōki, Mimasaka, Bizen, and Bingo Provinces.

The ancient capital and temples were built around Sōja. For much of the Muromachi Period, the province was dominated by the Hosokawa clan, who resided in Shikoku and allowed the province a degree of independence. By the Sengoku Period, other clans fought over Bitchu, and Oda Nobunaga and Mōri Terumoto were fighting in the province when Oda died, leading to a division of the province. After 1600, the province was divided among a variety of han (fiefs), and included a number of castles. By the time the provinces were reorganized into prefectures, the dominant city was the port, Kurashiki.

== Shrines and temples ==
Kibitsu jinja was the chief Shinto shrine (ichinomiya) of Bitchū.

== Historical districts ==
- Okayama Prefecture
  - Aga District (阿賀郡) - merged with Tetta District to become Atetsu District (阿哲郡) on April 1, 1900
  - Asakuchi District (浅口郡)
  - Jōbō District (上房郡) - dissolved
  - Kawakami District (川上郡) - dissolved
  - Kayō District (賀陽郡) - merged with Shimotsu District to become Kibi District (吉備郡) on April 1, 1900
  - Kuboya District (窪屋郡) - merged with Tsuu District to become Tsukubo District (都窪郡) on April 1, 1900
  - Oda District (小田郡)
  - Shimotsu District (下道郡) - merged with Kayō District to become Kibi District on April 1, 1900
  - Shitsuki District (後月郡) - dissolved
  - Tetta District (哲多郡) - merged with Aga District to become Atetsu District on April 1, 1900
  - Tsuu District (都宇郡) - merged with Kuboya District to become Tsukubo District on April 1, 1900
