= Takakoshi Castle =

Castle in Okayama, Japan

- 高越城
- Higashi-ku, Okayama Prefecture, Japan
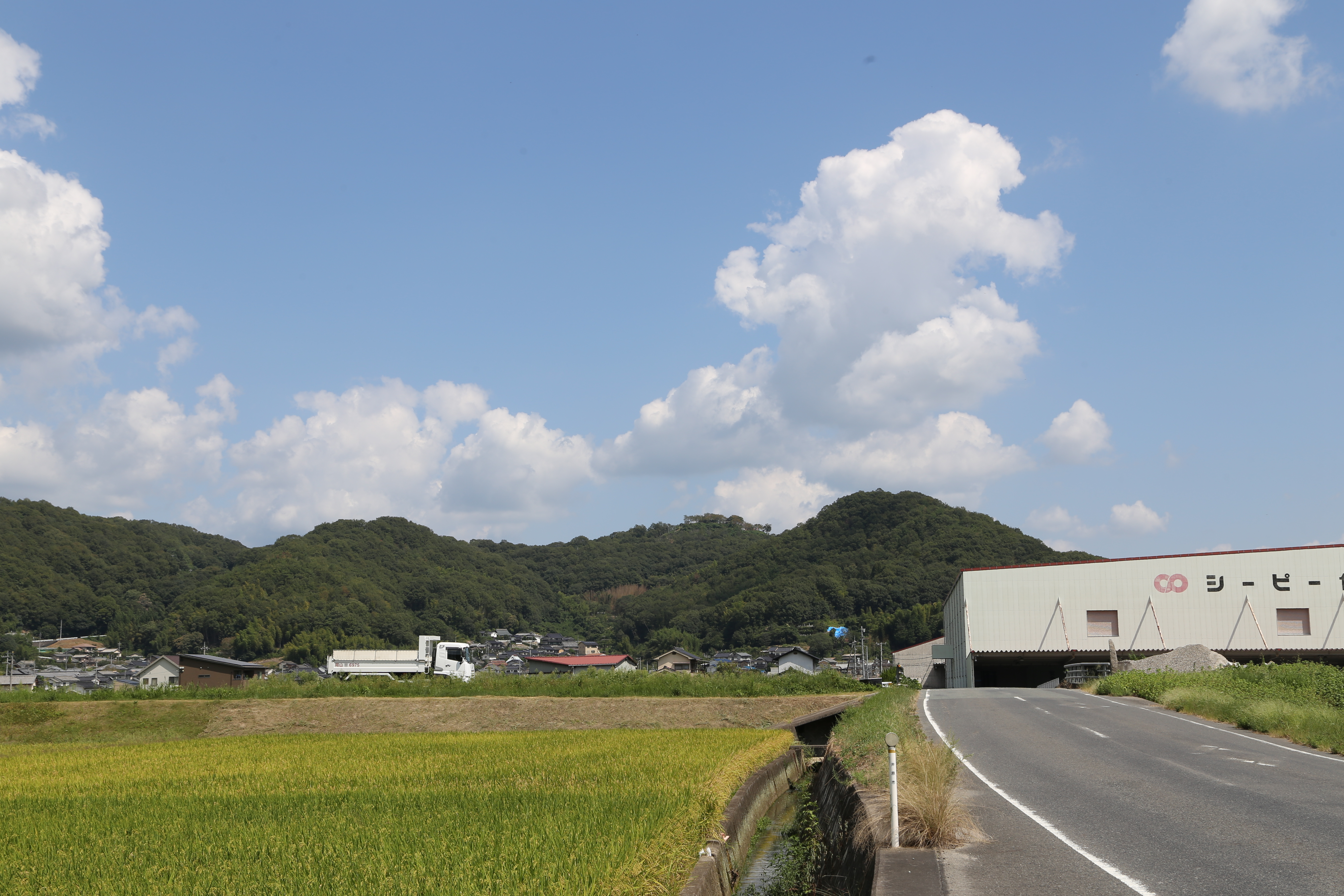
- Takakoshi Castle

Site information
- Type: yamajiro-style castle
- Owner: Utsunomiya clan, Ise clan, Mōri clan
- Condition: ruins

Location
- Coordinates: 34°36′20″N 133°31′12″E

Site history
- Built: 13c
- Built by: Utsunomiya Sadatsuna
- Demolished: 1600

Garrison information
- Past commanders: Hōjō Sōun, Shishido Takaie

Takakoshi Castle (高越城, Takakoshi-jō) also well known as Takakoshi-yama Castle is the remains of a castle structure in Ibara, Okayama Prefecture, Japan. The castle was built in the Nanboku-chō period against a possible invasion of Kublai Khan's force.

It has been said that Hōjō Sōun was born in the castle and he lived in the castle until he started serving the Ashikaga Shogunate. After the fall of the Ise clan, Takakoshi castle was controlled by the Mōri clan.
