= Nirayama Castle =

Hilltop castle in Izu Province, Japan

- 韮山城
- Izunokuni, Shizuoka Prefecture, Japan
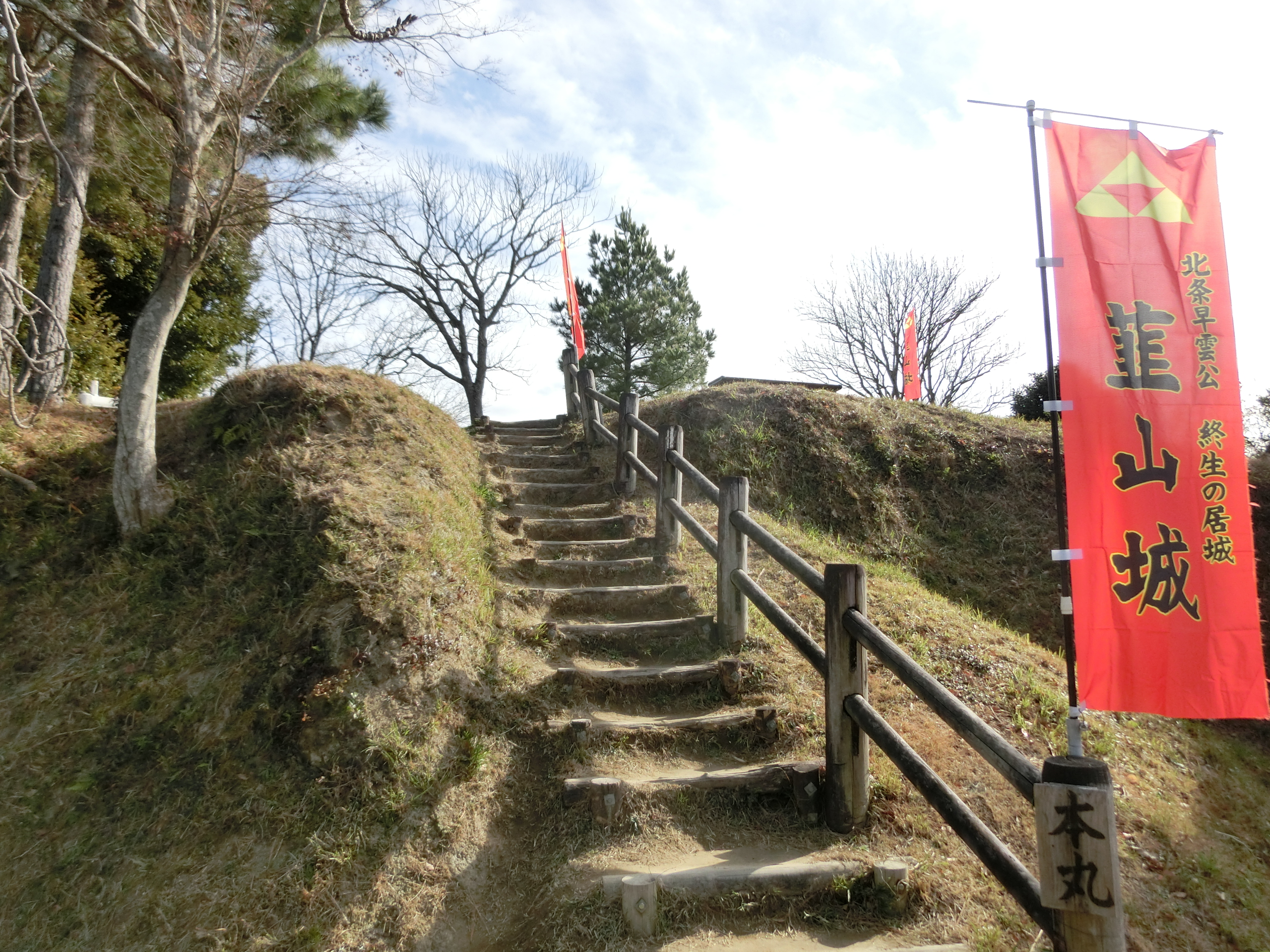

Site information
- Type: Hirayama-style castle
- Owner: Later Hōjō clan
- Condition: ruins

Location
- Nirayama Castle Nirayama Castle (Japan)
- Coordinates: 35°03′13.3″N 138°57′20.0″E

Site history
- Built: 1493
- Built by: Hōjō Sōun
- Demolished: 1601

Garrison information
- Past commanders: Hōjō Sōun, Hōjō Ujinori
- National Historic Site of Japan

Nirayama Castle (韮山城, Nirayama-jō) was a hilltop Japanese castle, now in ruins, located in the Nirayama neighborhood of the city of Izunokuni, Shizuoka, in the Tōkai region of Japan. It existed from the late Muromachi period to the Azuchi-Momoyama period. Its ruins have been protected as a National Historic Site since 2025.

== Overview ==
Nirayama Castle s located at a long and narrow hill at Izunokuni City, at the root of Izu Peninsula. This area was the stronghold of the Hōjō clan in the late Heian period and famous as a place where Minamoto no Yoritomo, founder of the Kamakura Shogunate spent his youth in exile. While the exact date of construction is unclear, according to the "Hōjō Godaiki," a fortification constructed during the Bunmei era (1469-1486) by Toyama Buzen-no-kami, a vassal of the first Horikoshi kubō, Ashikaga Masatomo. Masatomo was brother of Shogun Ashikaga Yoshimasa and had been sent to govern the Kanto region, but had been refused entry to Kamakura by the local lords and was forced to construct the Horigoe Gosho near Nirayama Castle. In 1491, Ise Moritoki (later known as Hōjō Sōun), who defeated the second Horikoshi kubō, Ashikaga Chachamaru, seized the castle and began full-scale construction as his new stronghold. Sōun claimed to be the successor to the Hōjō clan, and used Nirayama Castle as his base conquer Izu Province and much of Sagami Province. He transferred his seat to Odawara Castle in 1495, but Nirayama remained his preferred residence, and he died at Nirayama Castle in 1519.

Although his successors used Odawara Castle as their primary stronghold, Nirayama Castle remained an important local stronghold for the control of the Izu Peninsula. The castle was well fortified, with western style fortifications, and had supporting forts on four nearby hills. In August 1570, the castle was attacked during Takeda Shingen's invasion of Suruga Province, but Hōjō Ujinobu (the son of Hōjō Ujiyasu managed to defend it. During the Siege of Odawara (1590), Toyotomi Hideyoshi dispatched Oda Nobukatsu with a large army against Nirayama Castle. Hōjō Ujinobu, despite being greatly outnumbered, managed to hold for over 100 days until Hideyoshi dispatched Tokugawa Ieyasu to negotiate a surrender.

Subsequently, Nirayama Castle served as the residence of Ieyasu's vassal, Naito Nobunari. However, in 1601, he was transferred and the castle was abandoned. Its site became part of the territory of the Egawa clan, magistrates appointed by the Tokugawa shogunate, who governed Izu from the Nirayama Daikansho.

== Current ==
The castle is now only ruins with some earthen walls and water moats. Although remains of the enclosures and earthworks remain, and walking trails have been developed, the locations of the samurai residences and government offices are unknown, but there is a place called Gozashiki on the grounds of Nirayama High School. Archaeological excavations were carried out between 1990 and 1991 in conjunction with the reconstruction of the Nirayama High School building, and in addition to a well and a garden pond, remains believed to be those of a residence were also unearthed.

The castle site is about 10 minutes walk from Nirayama Station.

== See also ==
- List of Historic Sites of Japan (Shizuoka)

== Literature ==
- De Lange, William (2021). An Encyclopedia of Japanese Castles. Groningen: Toyo Press. pp. 600 pages. ISBN 978-9492722300.
- Schmorleitz, Morton S. (1974). Castles in Japan. Tokyo: Charles E. Tuttle Co. pp. 144–145. ISBN 0-8048-1102-4.
