= Kodaira Hirakushi Denchu Art Museum =

- 小平市平櫛田中彫刻美術館
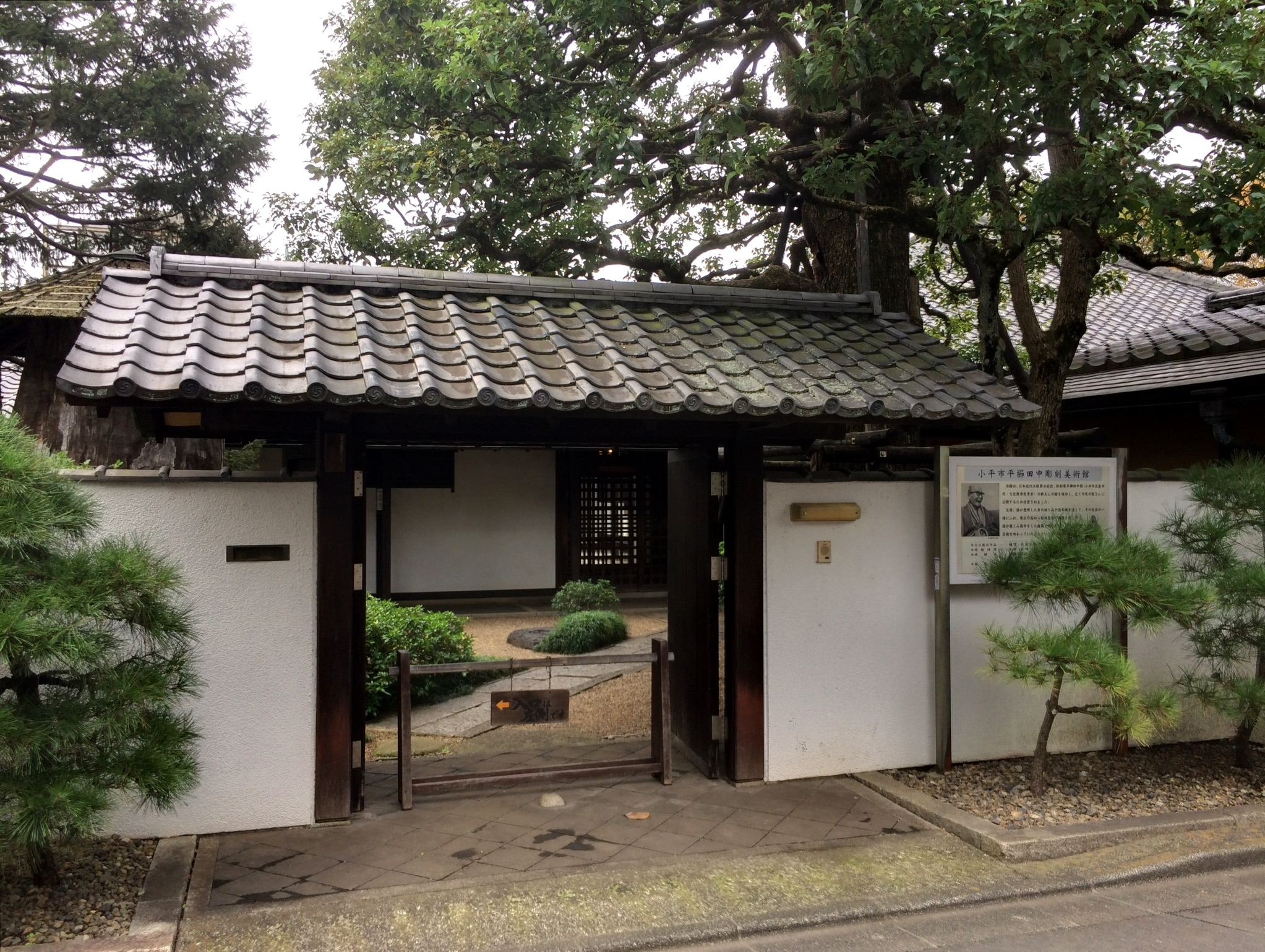
- Front of the museum
- Established: October 1984
- Location: Kodaira, Tokyo, Japan
- Coordinates: 35.717969°N 139.475573°E
- Type: Art museum
- Website: http://denchu-museum.jp/

The Kodaira Hirakushi Denchu Art Museum (小平市平櫛田中彫刻美術館, Kodaira-shi hirakushidenchū chōkoku bijutsukan) is an art museum in the city of Kodaira in western Tokyo, Japan, dedicated to the life and work of Japanese master wood sculptor Hirakushi Denchū (1872–1979). The museum preserves the last home and studio of Denchu, where he moved in 1970, and has a purpose-built exhibition annex building housing many of the sculptor's works.

The museum opened in October 1984, and is owned and operated by the city of Kodaira. The exhibition annex was opened in February 1994. It includes many of Denchu's works and studies, including a bronze casting (made from the original wood-carving) of Tenshō (Reincarnation) of 1920. The statue depicts a wrathful figure with a halo of flames – perhaps the Buddhist deity Fudô-myôô – as it vomits out a tiny human figure.
