= Xu Guangping =

Chinese writer

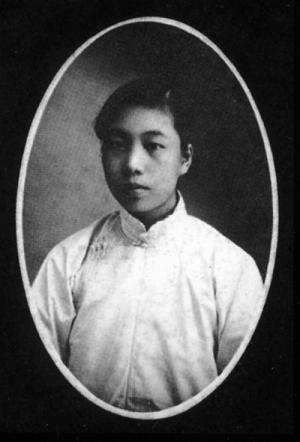
- Portrait of Ms. Xu Guangping.
- Born: 12 February 1898; Panyu County, Guangdong, China
- Died: 3 March 1968 (aged 70); Beijing, China
- Political party: China Association for Promoting Democracy; Chinese Communist Party
- Partner: Lu Xun (1927–1936)
- Children: Zhou Haiying （周海婴）

Xu Guangping (simplified Chinese: 许广平; traditional Chinese: 許廣平; Jyutping: heoi2 gwong2 ping4, 1898 – 1968), courtesy name Shuyuan (simplified Chinese: 漱园; traditional Chinese: 漱園), infant name Xia (simplified Chinese: 霞; traditional name: 霞), was a Chinese female writer, politician, and social activist. She was well known as the partner of Chinese writer Lu Xun. She engaged in the women's movement under the leadership of Deng Yingchao, and died of a heart attack in 1968 after Lu Xun's manuscripts were stolen.

== Biography ==
=== Early life ===
On 12 February 1898, Xu Guangping was born into the prestigious Xu family in Guangzhou, but her family was already in decline and needed to borrow money to maintain their dignity. Her father was the son of a concubine who had served as an official but lacked life stories. Her mother was the daughter of a merchant in Macau who was good at medicine and poetry. Xu Guangping had three brothers and two sisters, one of her sisters was the daughter of her father's concubine. When she was born, she cried loudly and left urine in her mother's womb, which was considered a sign of inauspiciousness. Then her father planned to give her to someone else, but her father got drunk and betrothed her to the evil gentry Ma family as his daughter-in-law.

In 1906, when Xu Guangping was eight years old, her mother wanted to bind her feet. Her mother's hometown was very particular about foot-binding. Her mother was chubby but had a pair of small feet that needed the help of a servant for walking. Xu Guangping was unwilling to bind her feet and wanted to seek her father's protection. Her father agreed that he would not bind her feet and sent her to her grandmother's place to hide.

In April of the same year, she entered the private school at home and began studying with the boys. Her mother supported this because she also studied with her brothers at home. She asked them to help Guangping with her studies.

When the 1911 Revolution broke out, Xu Guangping's family moved to Macau. Afterwards, her mother died and was taken care of by her older brother Xu Chongyi. Under the influence of her older brother, she began to make ideological progress and wanted to contribute to the country and nation. For example, she followed the suggestion in Women's Daily not to wear earrings. This aroused the father's disgust because it represented bereavement in local customs.

In 1915, Yuan Shikai declared himself emperor. Xu Guangping believed that it was a time of loyalty to the country. She wrote a letter to a female revolutionary hoping to join the fight against Yuan Shikai. However, this matter was leaked and her family prevented her from doing so.

In 1917, at the age of 19, Xu Guangping's father died. She wanted to resist her arranged marriage. According to Shunde's custom of "not leaving her husband's house" (不出夫家), to marry a concubine for her husband to replace her. Her second brother helped her dissolved their engagement. Then they defected to their aunt in Tianjin.

=== Education ===
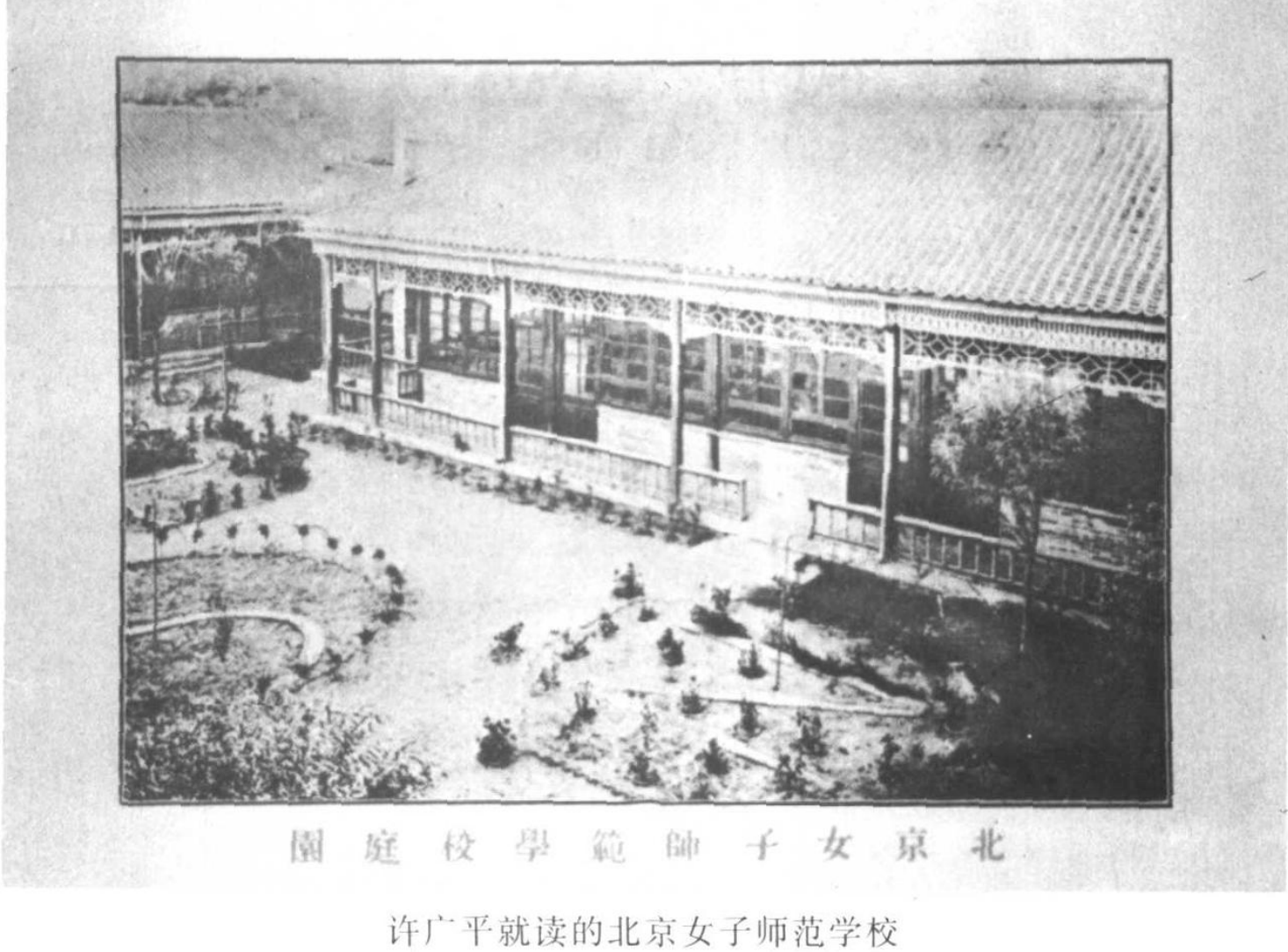
Beijing Women's Normal School

In 1917, she was admitted to the First Women's Normal School in Beiyang, and the following year she was promoted to a bachelor's degree in Guangzhou. During this period, she served as the editor in chief of the Tianjin Women's Patriotic Comrade Association magazine "Awakening Weekly"(醒世周刊). In December, Xu Guangping contributed four short essays in classical Chinese to the school magazine. She participated in a rally of ten thousand people in Nankai Square led by Zhou Enlai and others on October 10 and went to the police station to condemn Yang Yide, the director of the department who assaulted patriotic people.

In 1919, She experienced firsthand politics when China began to boycott Japanese goods as a result of the May Fourth Movement.

In 1921, Guangping then graduated from the Girls' Normal School and she enrolled in the Chinese department of Women's Normal College in Peking in the autumn. Guangping then decided to become the general secretary of the Student Council. While Guangping continued to write, her works would often be featured in the schools' various media channels. She continued her courses as normal, becoming interested in various fields of study. However, the political turmoil that was evident in China at the time made Guangping feel uneasy. The principal of her school was being asked to step down, as China rapidly became politically divided.

In 1925, Xu Guangping began her first communication with Lu Xun as a "primary school student", requesting clear guidance from Lu Xun. From then on, Lu Xun became her mentor. Between March and July, they exchanged over 40 letters, and at the end of the year, Xu Guangping and Lu Xun established a romantic relationship.

=== Career ===
In 1926, Xu Guangping graduated from school and returned to Guangzhou. She served as the training master and social supervisor of Guangdong Provincial First Women's Normal School and engaged in the women's movement under the leadership of Comrade Deng Yingchao. However, due to the intervention of some members of the guomintang, he school owed wages and then Xu Guangping resigned.

In January 1927, Lu Xun reached at Sun Yat-sen University. Xu Guangping is his teaching assistant. She accompanied Lu Xun to give speeches in Hong Kong and served as a Cantonese translator.

On 3 October of the same year, Xu Guangping and Lu Xun went to Shanghai to get married. She helped Lu Xun purchase books and consult materials in his work, and took care of Lu Xun in his daily life.

On 19 October 1936 – 1937, Lu Xun died. Xu Guangping organized of Lu Xun's relics for publication.

On 15 December 1941, Japanese gendarmes broke into the Xu family to investigate. The Japanese army arrested Xu Guangping on the same day in search of clues from Shanghai's anti-Japanese intellectuals. They tormented Xu Guangping into a coma three times, but she never gave in.

On 27 February 1942, Xu Guangping was arrested for 76 days and was released with the help of underground Chinese Communist Party (CCP) worker Yuan and Japanese friend Kanzō Uchiyama. When she came out, her hair turned white. She spared no effort to protect the safety of many friends.

=== Political life ===
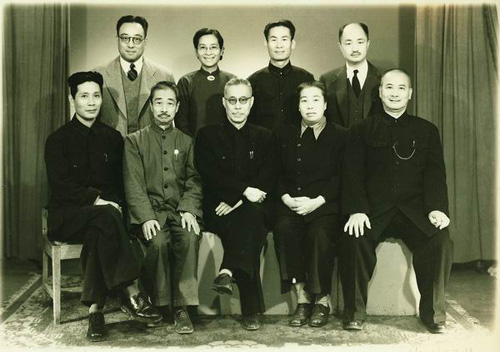
In September 1949, Xu Guangping was seated was seated second from the right in the front row of a group photograph of China Association for Promoting Democracy delegates attending the First plenary session of the Chinese People's Political Consultative Conference.

In the winter of 1948, Xu Guangping and a group of well-known progressives secretly went to Hong Kong at the invitation of the CCP and transferred to the Northeast Liberated Area.

In the spring of 1949, after Peiping was liberated, she arrived in Peiping. The All-China Women's Federation was held in Peiping, and Xu Guangping was elected as an executive member of the All-China Women's Federation; at the National Committee of the Chinese People's Political Consultative Conference, she was elected as a member of the National Committee of the Chinese People's Political Consultative Conference. After the founding of the People's Republic of China, Xu Guangping was appointed deputy secretary-general of the Government Affairs Council.

After 1950, Xu Guangping donated Lu Xun's former residences in Shanghai and Beijing, as well as Lu Xun's collection of books, antiques, manuscripts, letters, manuscripts and other relics to the country for the people's government to establish the Lu Xun Museum and Lu Xun Memorial Hall.

In September 1954, Xu Guangping was elected as a member of the Standing Committee of the National Committee of the Chinese People's Political Consultative Conference.

On 6 June 1961, after Xu Guangping applied many times, she was approved by the Central Committee of the Chinese Communist Party to become a CCP member. Xu Guangping has served as a leader of central delegations for many times, leading or participating in delegations to visit Japan, the Czech Republic, Vietnam, etc., and engage in foreign cultural exchange activities.

=== Death ===
In 1968, Qi Benyu, a member of the Central Cultural Revolution Group, stole all of Lu Xun's precious manuscripts and made them missing. Xu Guangping suffered a heavy blow and died of a heart attack.

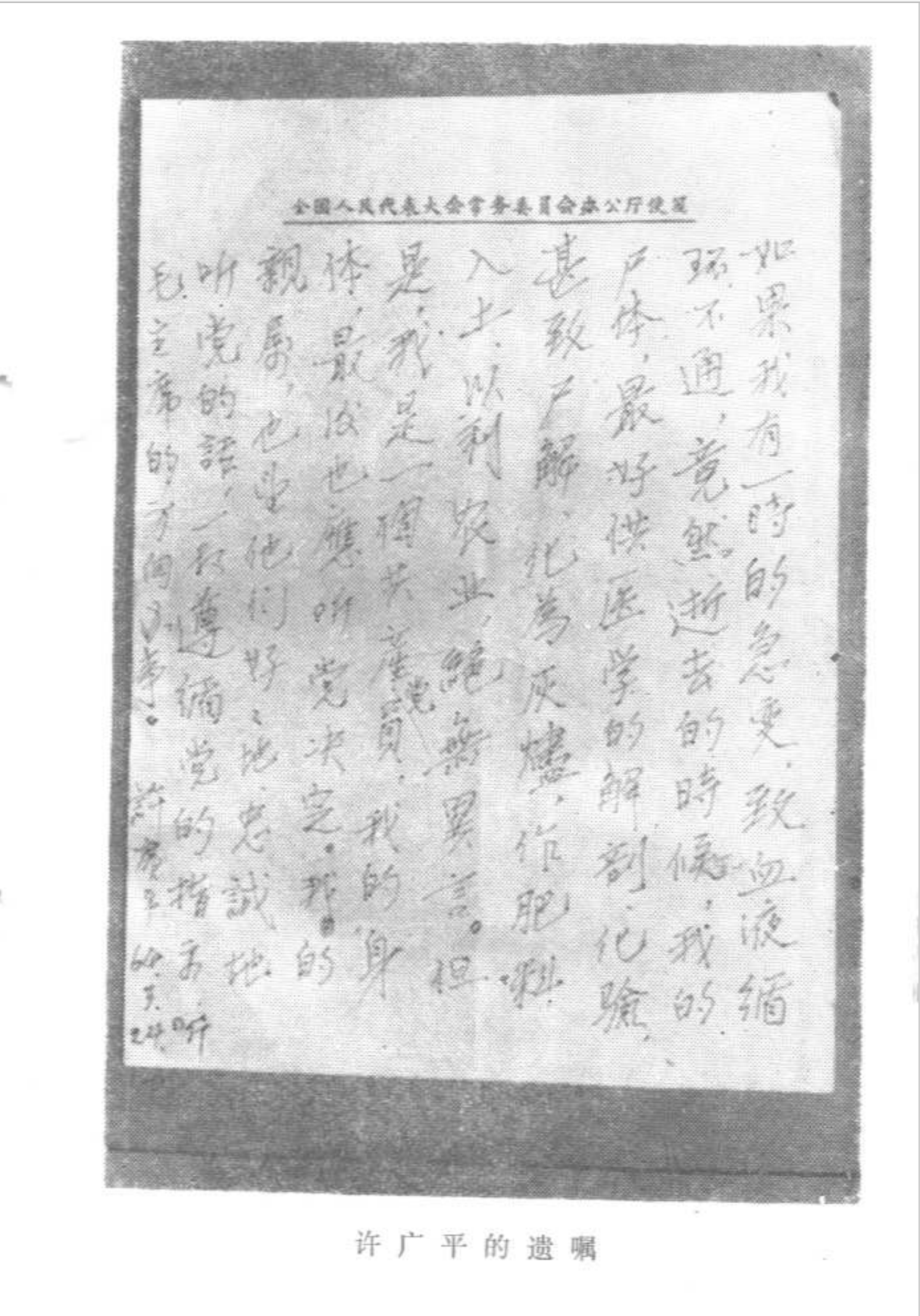
Xu Guangping's last words

== Pen names ==
Xu Guangping worte under the pen names including Jing Song (simplified Chinese: 景宋; traditional Chinese: 景宋), Ping Lin (simplified Chinese: 平林; traditional Chinese: 平林), KP, Lu Mei (simplified Chinese: 陆寐; traditional Chinese: 陸寐), Xu Xiu (simplified Chinese: 许秀; traditional Chinese: 許秀), Gui Zhen (simplified Chinese: 归真; traditional Chinese: 歸真), Shang Shi (simplified Chinese: 伤时; traditional Chinese: 傷時), Huang Bing (simplified Chinese: 黄竝; traditional Chinese: 黃竝), Zhou Hao (simplified Chinese: 周浩; traditional Chinese: 周浩), etc. Jing Song was the most frequently used one.

== Family ==
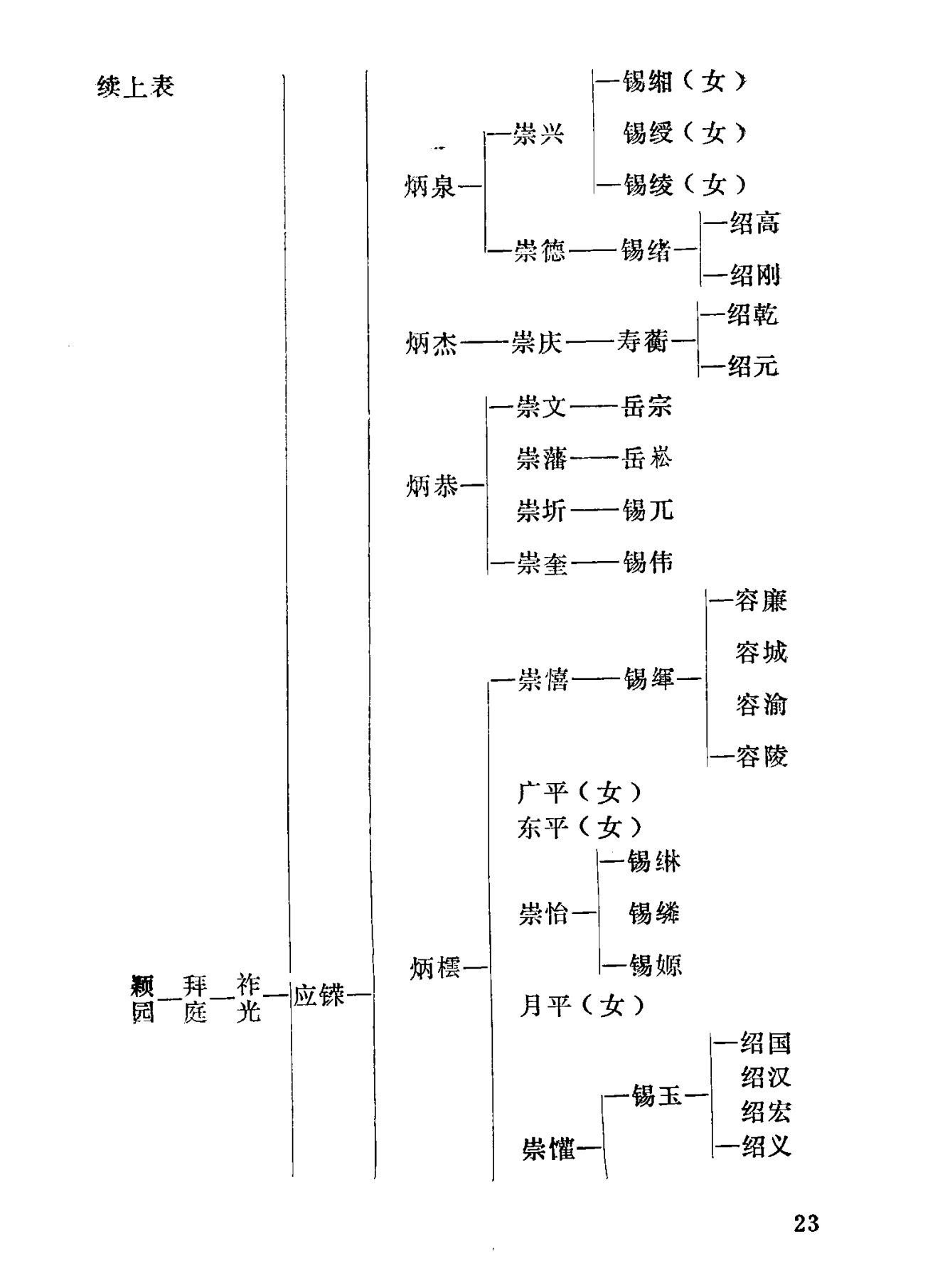
Xu Family Genealogy

Grandfather: Xu Yingrong (许应鑠) (1832 – 22 July 1903).

Born in Panyu County, Guangzhou, Guangdong Province (now Guangzhou, Guangdong Province), his ancestral home is Chenghai, Shantou, Guangdong Province. He was an official in the same court as Li Hongzhang and other famous ministers in the late Qing dynasty.

Father: Xu Bingyun (许炳橒) (1841 - 1894); alternate name: Xu Bing Yao (许炳瑶), the sixth son of a concubine. He was a famous official in the Qing dynasty.

Mother: Lady Song, the daughter of a businessman from Macau. She died when Xu Guangping was a child.

Sisters: Xu Dongping (许东平); Xu Yueping (许月平), the daughter of the concubine.

Brothers: Xu Chongyi (许崇憘); Xu Chonghuan (许崇權); Xu Chongyi (许崇怡).

Cousin: Xu Chongzhi (许崇智) (1886 – January 1965). From Guangdong Shantou, born noble family. In his early years, he attended the Japanese military Academy.

Partner: Lu Xun (鲁迅) (25 September 1881 – 19 October 1936)

From Shaoxing, Zhejiang Province. Famous litterateur, thinker, revolutionary, educator, democracy fighter, important participant of the new culture movement, one of the founders of modern Chinese literature.

Son: Zhou Haiying (周海婴) (27 September 1929 – 7 April 2011).

Born in Shanghai, Shaoxing, Zhejiang Province, he studied radio at the Physics Department of Peking University from 1952 to 1960.

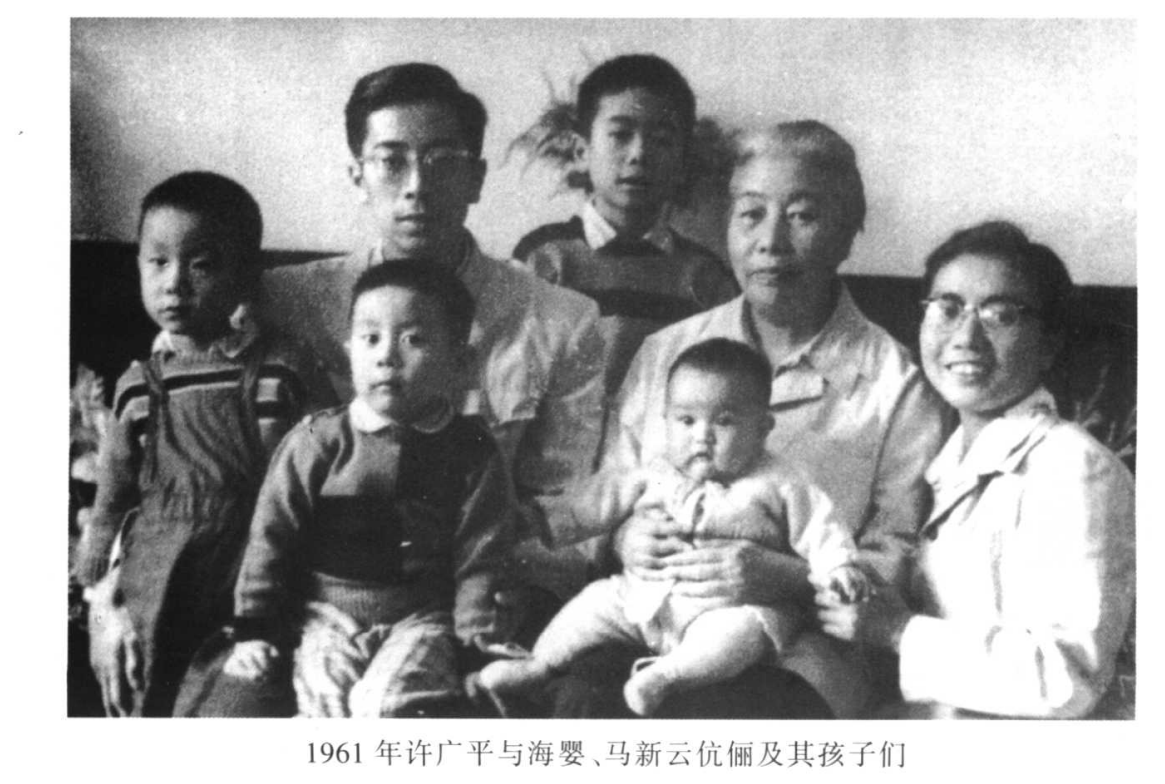
Xu Guangping and her descendant

== Literary works ==
- Letters from Two Places (两地书, 1933)
- Before and After the Disaster (遭难前后, 1947)
- A Gratifying Commemoration (欣慰的纪念, 1951)
- Letters of Lu Xun (鲁迅书简, 1953)
- Memoirs of Lu Xun (鲁迅回忆录, 1961)
- Collected Works of Xu Guangping (许广平文集, 1998)
  - Collected Works of Xu Guangping consists of three volumes, and the editor includes a total of 389 works by Xu Guangping from 1917 to 1966.
- Ten years of sharing hardships together: Xu Guangping recalls Lu Xun (十年携手共艰危：许广平忆鲁迅, 2001)
- Lu Xun and I (我与鲁迅, 2019)

== Former residence ==
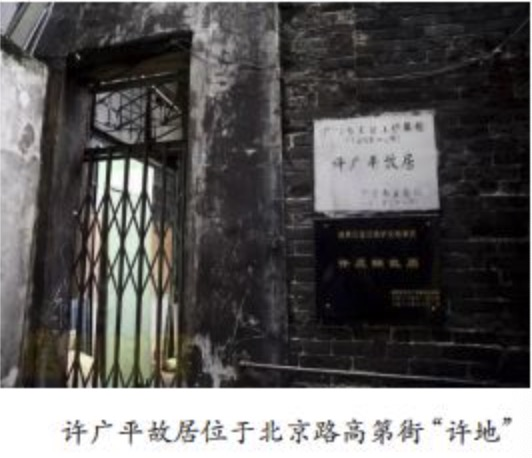
Xu Guangping's Former Residence

The former residence is located in the "Xu Di" of Gaodi Street, Beijing Road, Yuexiu District, Guangzhou City today, with the house number being No. 33-34. According to the memories of descendants of the Xu family, Xu Guangping spent most of her time here before she was admitted to Beiyang Women No.1 Normal School in 1917.

From the appearance, the former residence is a blue brick building with two bedrooms and a courtyard that is characterized with Lingnan furniture features. It has a brick and wood structure and an area of about 100 square meters. According to the memories of Xu's descendants, the building has a history of more than 160 years and is still occupied by Xu Guangping's nephew and her descendants.

== Monument ==
The Monument of Xu Guangping was built in Fu Shou Yuan Humanism Memorial Park, Shanghai on September 27, 2011.
