= Ibara =

Ibara 井原市
- City
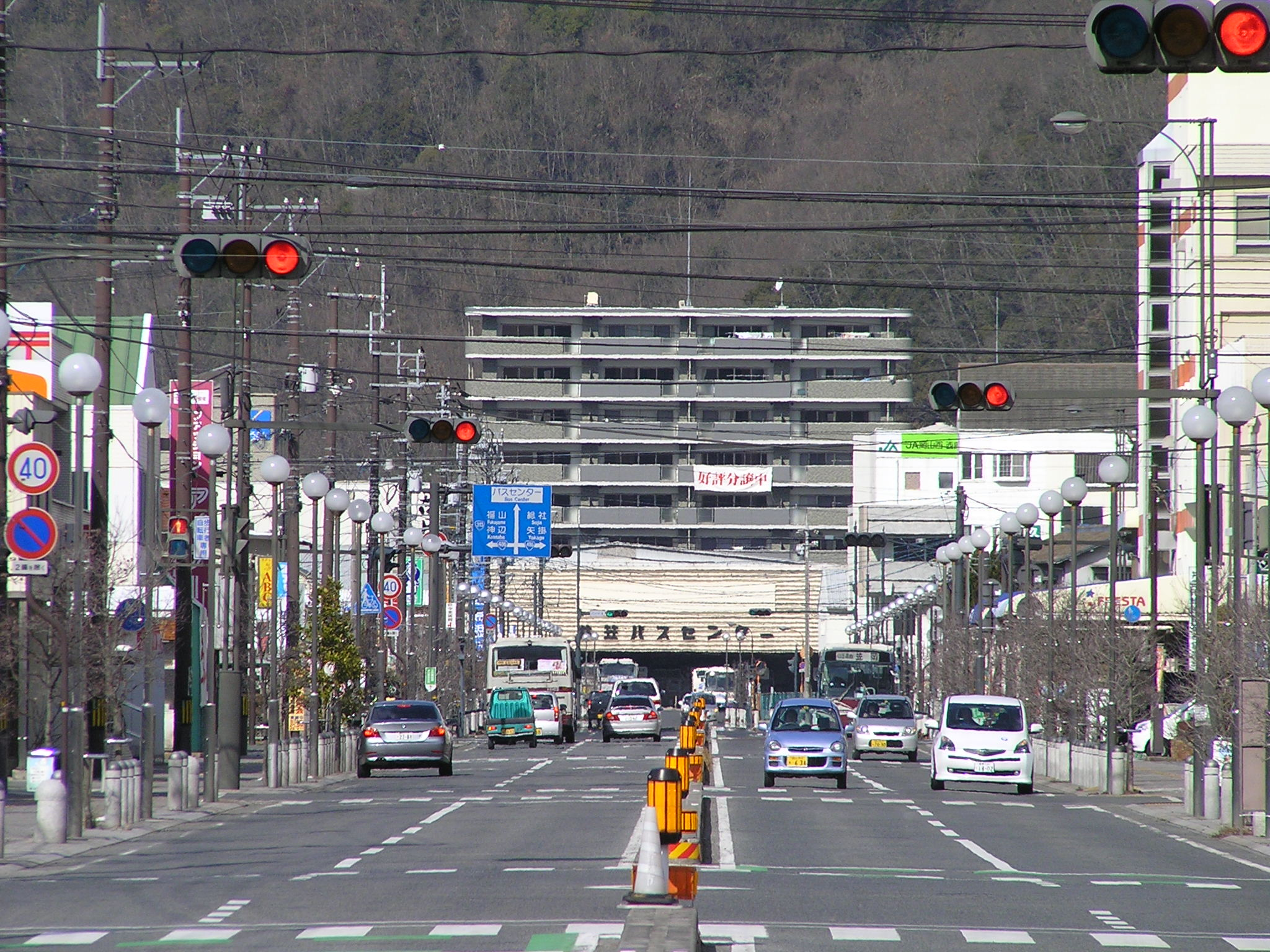
- The street in front of Ibara Station

- Flag Emblem

- Location of Ibara in Okayama Prefecture

- Location in Japan
- Coordinates: 34°36′N 133°28′E
- Country: Japan
- Region: Chūgoku (San'yō)
- Prefecture: Okayama Prefecture

Area
  - Total: 243.54 km^{2} (94.03 sq mi)

Population (March 31, 2023)
  - Total: 37,835
  - Density: 155.35/km^{2} (402.37/sq mi)
- Time zone: UTC+09:00 (JST)
- City hall address: 311-1 Ibaramachi, Ibara-shi, Okayama-ken 715-8601
- Website: Official website
- Symbols
- Flower: Sakura
- Tree: Japanese black pine

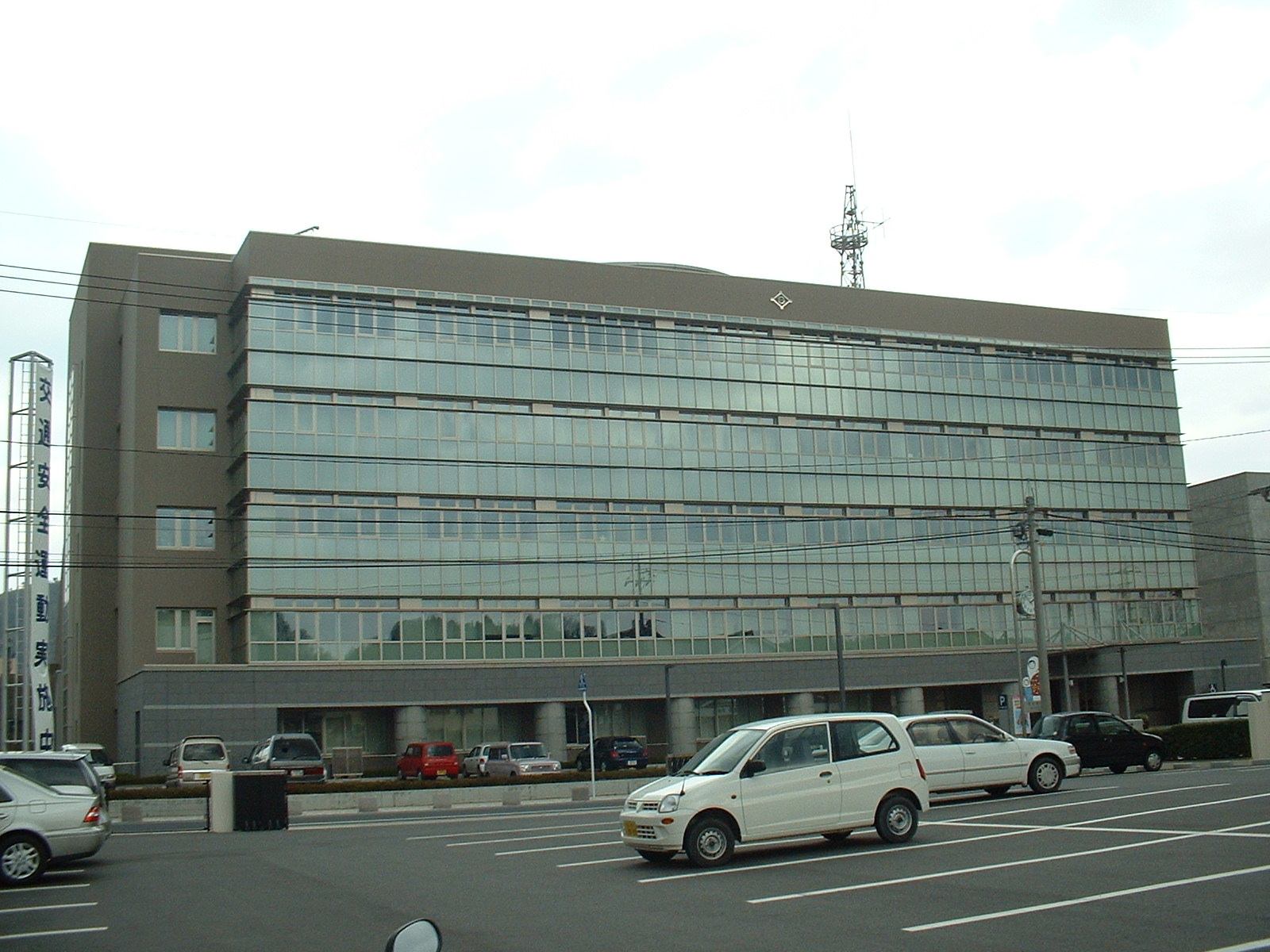
Ibara City Hall

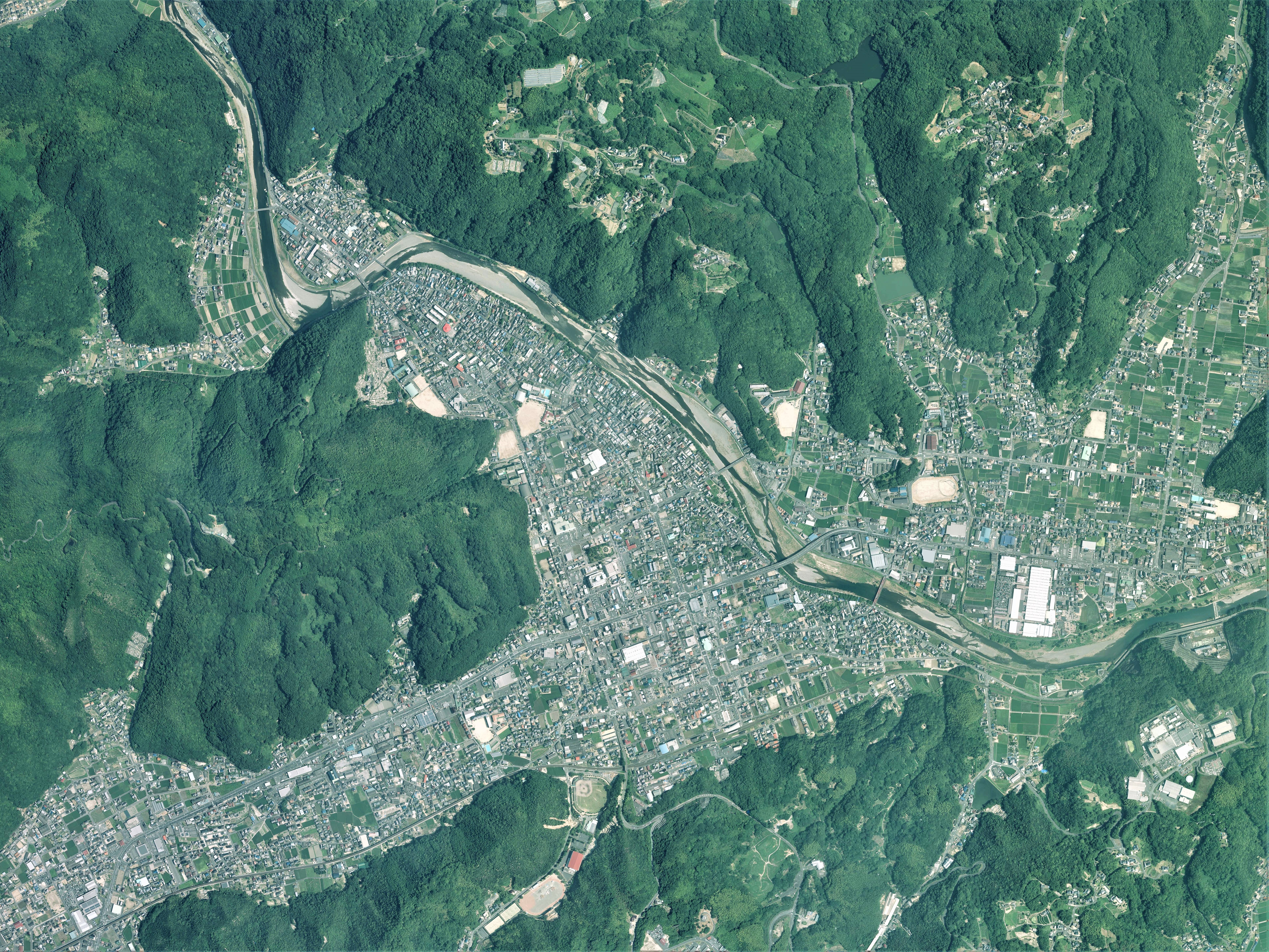
Aerial photo of Ibara city center

Ibara (井原市, Ibara-shi; Japanese pronunciation: [ì.bä́.ɾä́(.ɕì)]) is a city located in Okayama Prefecture, Japan. As of 31 March 2023, the city had an estimated population of 37,835 in 16,677 households and a population density of 160 persons per km^{2}. The total area of the city is 243.54 square kilometres (94.03 sq mi).

== Geography ==
Ibara is located in west-central Okayama Prefecture. The Oda River, a tributary of the Takahashi River, flows from north to south from Hiroshima Prefecture, and changes its flow eastward in the center of the city. It forms a basin sandwiched between mountains and hills to the north and south, which is where the main urban concentration of the city is located. The northern part of the city has numerous hamlets villages spread out on a limestone karst plateau at an elevation of 400 to 500 meters.

=== Adjoining municipalities ===
Hiroshima Prefecture

- Fukiyama
- Jinsekikōgen

Okayama Prefecture

- Kasaoka
- Sōja
- Takahashi
- Yakage

=== Climate ===
Ibara has a humid subtropical climate (Köppen climate classification Cfa) with very warm summers and cool winters. The average annual temperature in Ibara is 15.1 °C. The average annual rainfall is 1289 mm with September as the wettest month. The temperatures are highest on average in August, at around 26.8 °C, and lowest in January, at around 4.3 °C.

== Demographics ==
Per Japanese census data, the population of Ibara is as follows.

Historical population
Year	Pop.	±%
1920	51,283	—
1930	52,461	+2.3%
1940	51,797	−1.3%
1950	63,290	+22.2%
1960	60,899	−3.8%
1970	54,350	−10.8%
1980	51,669	−4.9%
1990	49,255	−4.7%
2000	46,489	−5.6%
2010	43,936	−5.5%

== History ==
The Ibara area is part of ancient Bitchū Province and was the site of a shōen landed estate ruled by the Nasu clan. In the Muromachi period, the lord of Ibara-shō, Ise Moritoki, went to Suruga Province in 1476 to assist his nephew Imagawa Ujichika succeed to the head of the Imagawa clan. Ise Moritoki later changed his name to Hōjō Sōun and seized control of the Kanto region from his stronghold at Odawara Castle. During the Edo Period, it was largely divided between the holdings of Fukuyama Domain and direct territory of the shogunate. Following the Meiji restoration, the area was organized into villages within Shitsuki District, Okayama with the creation of the modern municipalities system on April 1, 1889. Ibara was elevated to town status on February 26, 1896.

The city of Ibara was established on March 30, 1953, from the merger of the three towns of Ibara, Nishiebara, and Takaya and the five villages of Ebara, Kinoko, Kenshu, Aono, Yamanoue plus the villages of Itakura and Oe from Oda District, Okayama. (Akaiwa)|Yoshii]] (all from Akaiwa District).

On March 1, 2005, the town of Yoshii (from Shitsuki District), and the town of Bisei (from Oda District) were merged into Ibara.

== Government ==
Ibara has a mayor-council form of government with a directly elected mayor and a unicameral city council of 18 members. Ibara, together with the municipalities of Oda District, contributes two members to the Okayama Prefectural Assembly. In terms of national politics, the city is part of the Okayama 3rd district of the lower house of the Diet of Japan.

== Economy ==
Then economy of Ibara is primarily based on light industry. Textiles, automobile parts, electronic parts, food container manufacturing, mining, are major contributors. Ihara Seiki, an automobile parts manufacturer, is headquartered in Ibara.

== Education ==
Ibara has 13 public elementary schools, five public junior high schools and one public high school operated by the city government, and one public high school operated by the Okayama Prefectural Board of Education. There is also one private high school.

== Transportation ==
=== Railway ===
Ibara Railway Company - Ibara Line

- Sōunnosato-Ebara - Ibara - Izue - Komoriutanosato-Takaya

=== Highways ===
- San'yō Expressway
- National Route 313
- National Route 486

== Sister cities ==
Ibara is twinned with:

- Uozu, Toyama, Japan (1982)
- Ōtawara, Tochigi, Japan (1984)

== Local attractions ==
- Bisei Astronomical Observatory
- Chūsei Yumegahara, a theme park with a faux medieval mountain village and handicraft shops.
- Denchū Art Museum, centered on the works of sculptor Hirakushi Denchū (1872–1979), who was born in Nishiebara (now part of Ibara)

== Notable people from Ibara ==
- Kanzō Uchiyama, Christian intellectual
