= Bisei Spaceguard Center =

Japanese astronomical observatory

Minor planets discovered: 433
see § List of discovered minor planets

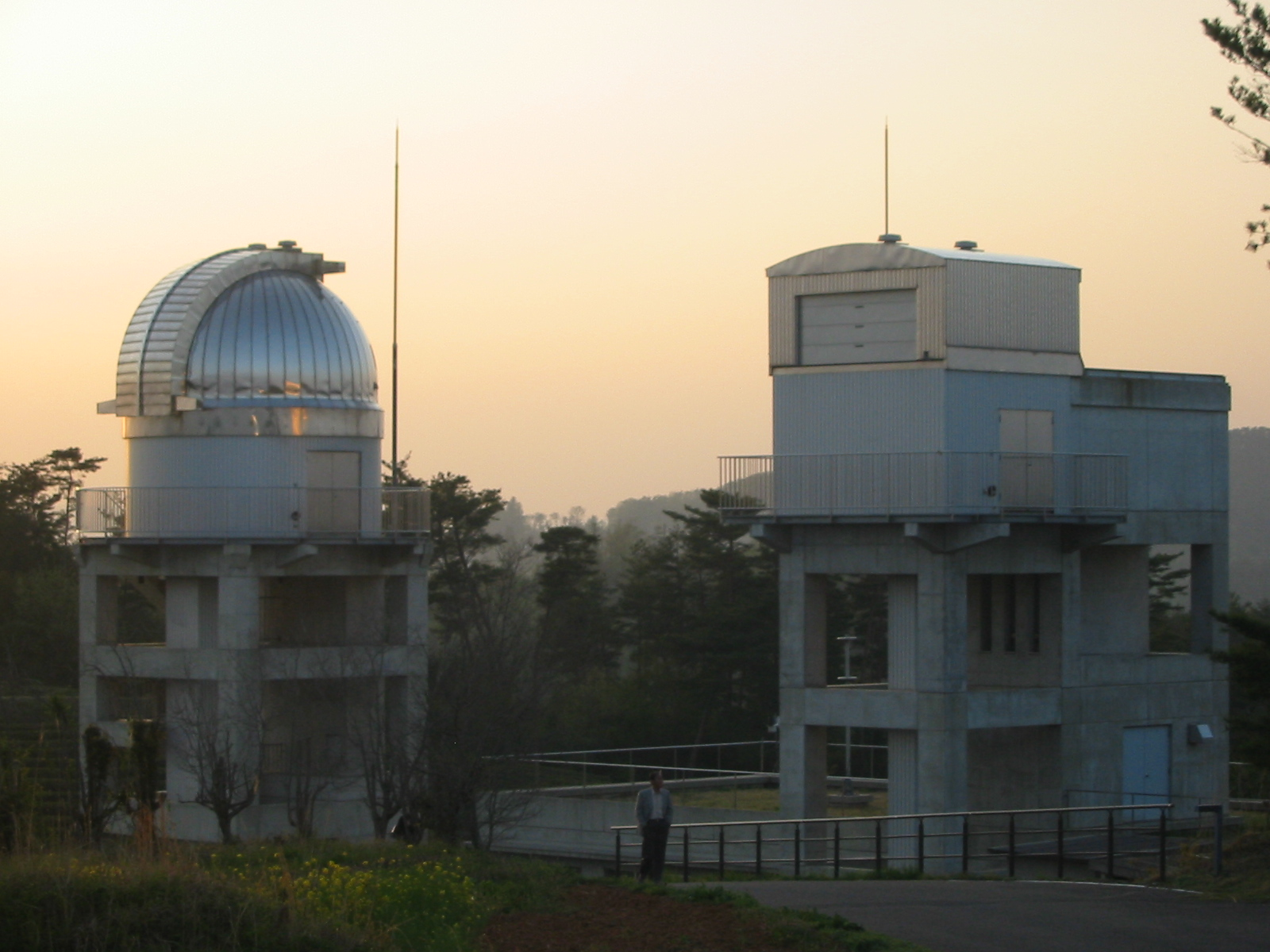
The Bisei Spaceguard Center in Japan runs the BATTeRS project since 2000.

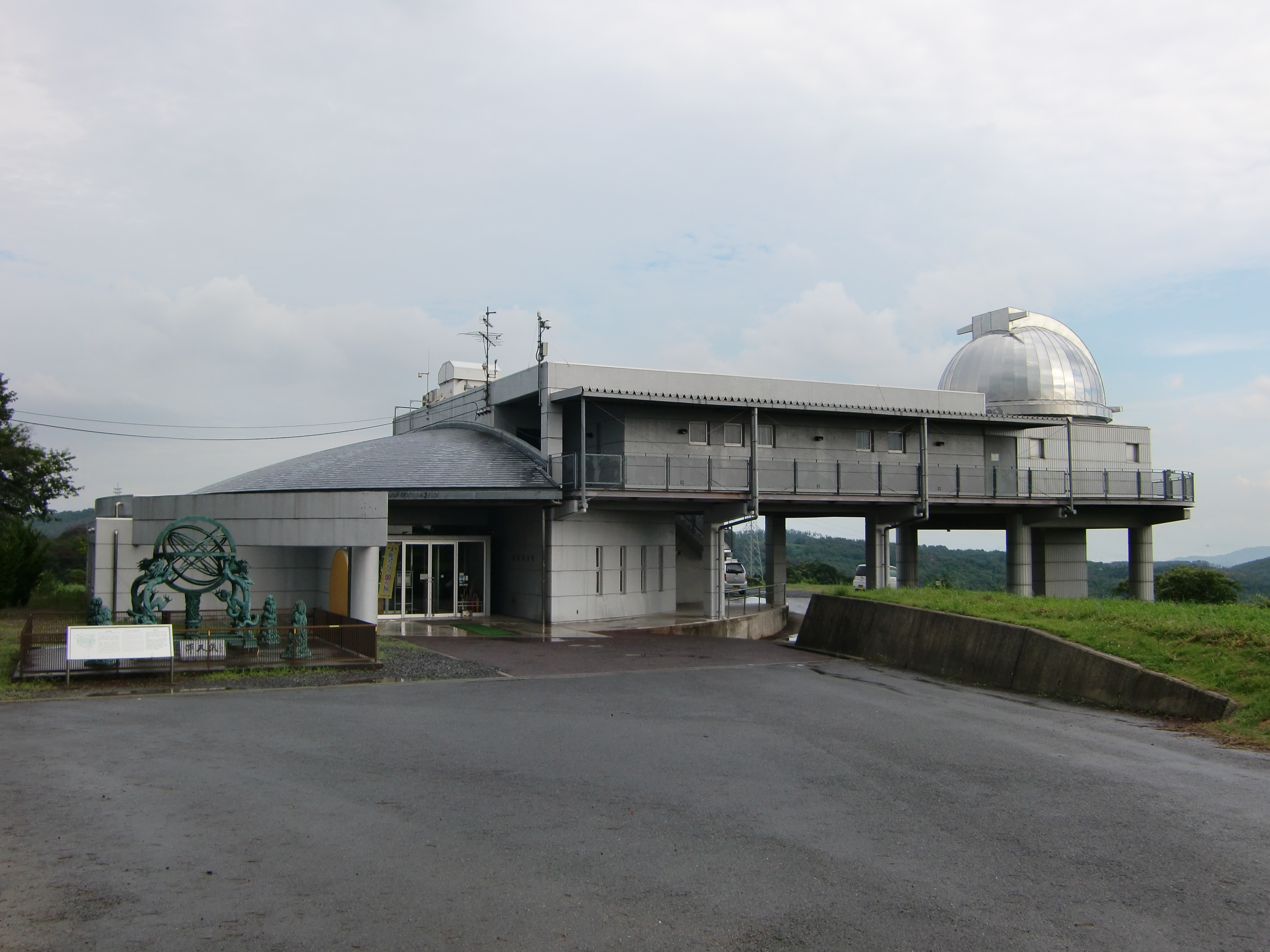
The Bisei Astronomical Observatory

The Bisei Spaceguard Center (Japanese: 美星スペースガードセンター) (BSGC) is a spaceguard facility adjacent to the Bisei Astronomical Observatory (BAO), an astronomical observatory located at Bisei-chō, Ibara, Okayama Prefecture, Japan. The facility was constructed during 1999–2000, where it since conducts the Bisei Asteroid Tracking Telescope for Rapid Survey or BATTeRS (バッターズ), an astronomical survey that solely tracks asteroids and space debris. BATTeRS has discovered numerous minor planets and the periodic, Halley-type comet and near-Earth object C/2001 W2 (BATTERS).

Space debris, along with defunct spaceships, satellites as well as other small objects can present a hazard to operating spacecraft. Built by the Japan Space Forum (JSF) with contributions by the Japanese Ministry of Education, Culture, Sports, Science and Technology, all expenses of the center are covered by the Japan Aerospace Exploration Agency (JAXA). The telescopes which keep track of any space debris are staffed and operated by members of the Japan Spaceguard Association.

The 1-meter Cassegrain telescope has a field of view of three degrees and there are plans to use a mosaic of ten CCD detectors each one of which will have dimensions of 2096 x 4096 pixels. A 0.5-meter telescope with a field of view of 2 x 2 degrees began operations in February 2000. Once the 1-meter NEO search telescope begins operations, the 0.5-meter telescope will be used to provide follow-up astrometric observations.

The main-belt asteroid 17286 Bisei, discovered by BATTeRS in July 2000, was named after the town where the Bisei Spaceguard Center and the Bisei Astronomical Observatory are located.

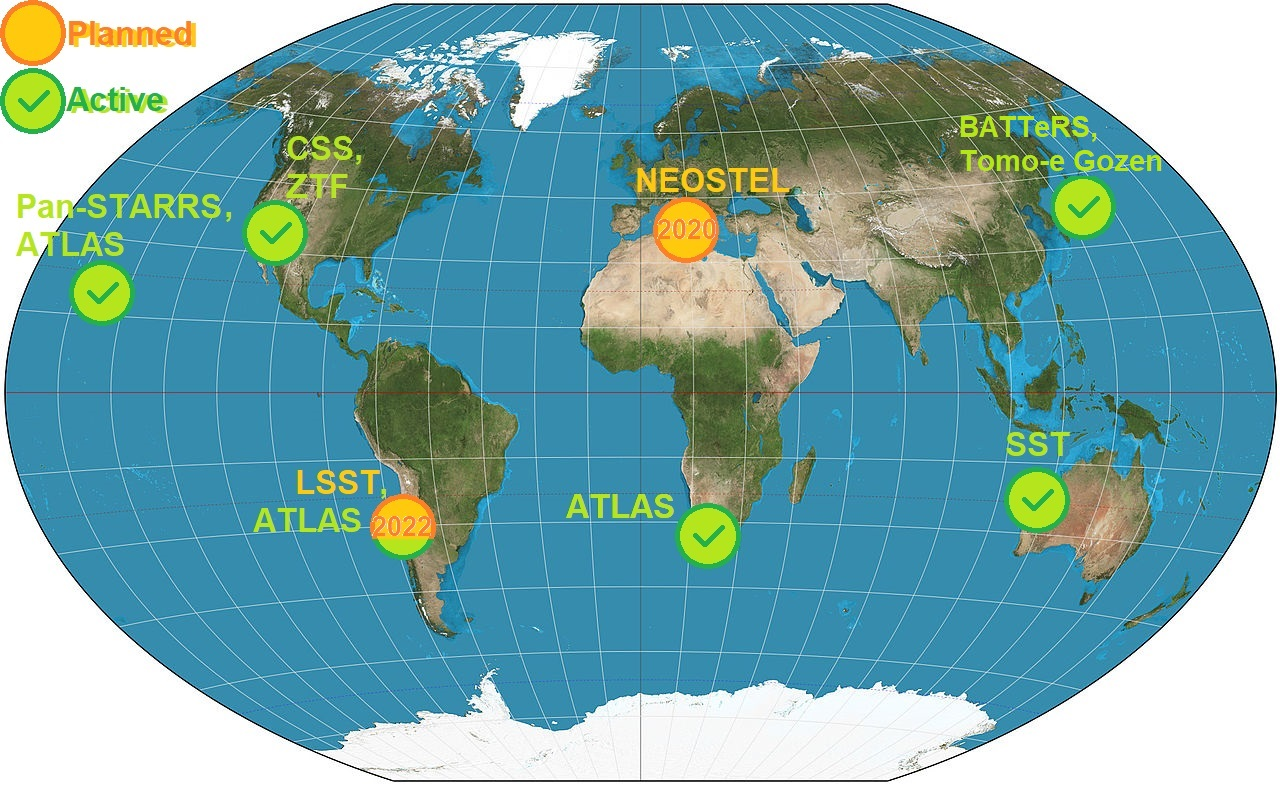
BATTeRS(Bisei Asteroid Tracking Telescope for Rapid Survey) is the one of global NEO survey sites.

== List of discovered minor planets ==
BATTeRS has discovered more than 400 minor planets during its course. As an anomaly, the survey is also credited with the discovery of (100501) 1996 XA_{19} at Kiso Observatory in 1996, or 4 years before the Bisei Spaceguard Center was constructed. Members of the program include Atsuo Asami, David J. Asher and Syuichi Nakano. Takeshi Urata was also a former member of BATTerS.

17286 Bisei	8 July 2000	list
18156 Kamisaibara	3 August 2000	list
18160 Nihon Uchu Forum	7 August 2000	list
18161 Koshiishi	7 August 2000	list
(20826) 2000 UV_{13}	21 October 2000	list
22177 Saotome	6 December 2000	list
23259 Miwadagakuen	29 December 2000	list
25884 Asai	20 September 2000	list
(25892) 2000 WP_{9}	22 November 2000	list
30448 Yoshiomoriyama	7 July 2000	list
32184 Yamaura	8 July 2000	list
32270 Inokuchihiroo	4 August 2000	list
32272 Hasegawayuya	4 August 2000	list
32288 Terui	23 August 2000	list
34088 Satokosuka	6 August 2000	list
34123 Uedayukika	25 August 2000	list
34399 Hachiojihigashi	7 September 2000	list
34424 Utashima	24 September 2000	list
34817 Shiominemoto	21 September 2001	list
34893 Mihomasatoshi	17 November 2001	list
36424 Satokokumasaki	3 August 2000	list
36426 Kakuda	5 August 2000	list
36472 Ebina	27 August 2000	list
36782 Okauchitakashige	20 September 2000	list
36783 Kagamino	23 September 2000	list

38669 Michikawa	3 August 2000	list
39314 Moritakumi	19 October 2001	list
(41481) 2000 QE_{35}	28 August 2000	list
(41502) 2000 QK_{147}	23 August 2000	list
(43428) 2000 YT_{17}	28 December 2000	list
(43605) 2001 WD_{16}	25 November 2001	list
(45855) 2000 TA_{2}	3 October 2000	list
(45878) 2000 WX_{29}	23 November 2000	list
(48200) 2001 KU_{1}	19 May 2001	list
(51659) 2001 JN_{1}	14 May 2001	list
(54510) 2000 PD_{7}	6 August 2000	list
(54564) 2000 QZ_{148}	30 August 2000	list
(54610) 2000 RG_{52}	6 September 2000	list
(56798) 2000 PW_{3}	3 August 2000	list
(56954) 2000 SF_{7}	24 September 2000	list
56957 Seohideaki	24 September 2000	list
(61141) 2000 NZ_{5}	8 July 2000	list
61189 Ohsadaharu	8 July 2000	list
(61344) 2000 PT_{5}	3 August 2000	list
61444 Katokimiko	25 August 2000	list
(61470) 2000 QK_{35}	27 August 2000	list
62151 Mayumisuzuki	24 September 2000	list
62152 Akatsuki	24 September 2000	list
(62153) 2000 SD_{21}	24 September 2000	list
63389 Noshiro	12 May 2001	list

63897 Ofunato	18 September 2001	list
64547 Saku	16 November 2001	list
(64549) 2001 WO_{1}	18 November 2001	list
(67397) 2000 PR_{4}	3 August 2000	list
(67711) 2000 UB	18 October 2000	list
67712 Kimotsuki	21 October 2000	list
(67720) 2000 UQ_{11}	26 October 2000	list
(67980) 2000 XU_{10}	4 December 2000	list
68021 Taiki	29 December 2000	list
72012 Terute	4 December 2000	list
(72035) 2000 XR_{38}	6 December 2000	list
(83941) 2001 WD	16 November 2001	list
87271 Kokubunji	3 August 2000	list
(87307) 2000 PA_{28}	7 August 2000	list
87312 Akirasuzuki	23 August 2000	list
(87627) 2000 RH_{52}	6 September 2000	list
(87705) 2000 SY_{24}	26 September 2000	list
(89354) 2001 VL_{76}	14 November 2001	list
(93068) 2000 SR_{24}	26 September 2000	list
(93069) 2000 SX_{24}	26 September 2000	list
(93101) 2000 SU_{42}	26 September 2000	list
(97830) 2000 PA_{4}	3 August 2000	list
(97835) 2000 PF_{7}	5 August 2000	list
(97860) 2000 QR_{26}	27 August 2000	list
(98125) 2000 SB_{21}	24 September 2000	list

(98128) 2000 SS_{24}	26 September 2000	list
(98392) 2000 UC	18 October 2000	list
(98558) 2000 WB_{10}	22 November 2000	list
(98691) 2000 XL_{14}	5 December 2000	list
(100501) 1996 XA_{19}	8 December 1996	list
(105137) 2000 NA_{6}	8 July 2000	list
(105652) 2000 SU_{24}	26 September 2000	list
(105845) 2000 SB_{163}	27 September 2000	list
(109713) 2001 RZ_{47}	15 September 2001	list
(111179) 2001 WG	16 November 2001	list
(111241) 2001 XV	7 December 2001	list
(118982) 2000 XK_{14}	5 December 2000	list
(119531) 2001 VX_{1}	8 November 2001	list
(122279) 2000 PE_{7}	6 August 2000	list
(122570) 2000 RG_{12}	3 September 2000	list
(122702) 2000 SV_{24}	26 September 2000	list
(123355) 2000 WC_{9}	18 November 2000	list
(125370) 2001 VP_{71}	10 November 2001	list
(125457) 2001 WD_{4}	17 November 2001	list
(130603) 2000 SE_{7}	24 September 2000	list
(130612) 2000 SQ_{24}	26 September 2000	list
(140610) 2001 UG_{5}	19 October 2001	list
(150483) 2000 PQ_{4}	3 August 2000	list
(150585) 2000 WN_{9}	22 November 2000	list
(151695) 2003 AB_{64}	7 January 2003	list

(153047) 2000 QW_{68}	29 August 2000	list
(153813) 2001 WE	16 November 2001	list
(156066) 2001 SR_{73}	19 September 2001	list
(158002) 2000 PG_{7}	5 August 2000	list
(168871) 2000 WB_{9}	18 November 2000	list
(178734) 2000 TB_{2}	3 October 2000	list
(187885) 2000 RS_{53}	7 September 2000	list
(189526) 2000 PW_{4}	4 August 2000	list
(190930) 2001 VF_{5}	10 November 2001	list
(194381) 2001 VY_{1}	8 November 2001	list
(200400) 2000 SZ_{24}	26 September 2000	list
(202738) 2007 LK_{1}	10 June 2007	list
(202755) 2007 QW_{1}	20 August 2007	list
(204830) 2007 PP_{25}	13 August 2007	list
(204917) 2008 SY_{82}	26 September 2008	list
(205360) 2000 XT_{38}	6 December 2000	list
(207682) 2007 QX	17 August 2007	list
(207872) 2007 VX_{243}	14 November 2007	list
(208206) 2000 ST_{24}	26 September 2000	list
(210207) 2007 QV	17 August 2007	list
(210346) 2007 UM_{1}	16 October 2007	list
(210348) 2007 UY_{3}	17 October 2007	list
(210349) 2007 UJ_{4}	16 October 2007	list
(210400) 2007 VE_{245}	14 November 2007	list
(212817) 2007 UH_{1}	16 October 2007	list

(212818) 2007 UN_{1}	16 October 2007	list
(212859) 2007 VQ_{91}	7 November 2007	list
(212874) 2007 VC_{185}	12 November 2007	list
(212909) 2007 XQ_{15}	8 December 2007	list
(212980) 2009 CW_{37}	14 February 2009	list
(215190) 2000 PU_{3}	3 August 2000	list
(216330) 2007 VT_{94}	7 November 2007	list
(218923) 2007 UE_{1}	16 October 2007	list
(219007) 2008 YX	19 December 2008	list
(221893) 2008 JU_{19}	5 May 2008	list
(222343) 2000 WC_{10}	23 November 2000	list
(225089) 2007 PG_{28}	14 August 2007	list
(225269) 2009 SO_{15}	19 September 2009	list
(225601) 2000 YY_{29}	29 December 2000	list
(228188) 2009 UA_{21}	22 October 2009	list
(229892) 2009 UW_{127}	28 October 2009	list
(231629) 2009 TH_{13}	14 October 2009	list
(233577) 2007 QU_{1}	17 August 2007	list
(233894) 2008 YK_{29}	27 December 2008	list
(233926) 2009 UN_{4}	18 October 2009	list
(233957) 2009 YQ_{16}	19 December 2009	list
(236972) 2008 AV_{3}	5 January 2008	list
(236978) 2008 OG_{3}	27 July 2008	list
(237239) 2008 WN_{32}	20 November 2008	list
(237298) 2008 YM_{29}	27 December 2008	list

(239630) 2008 VV_{14}	5 November 2008	list
(239635) 2008 WW_{12}	19 November 2008	list
(241280) 2007 UA_{1}	16 October 2007	list
(241321) 2007 VQ_{94}	7 November 2007	list
(241326) 2007 VZ_{126}	11 November 2007	list
(241361) 2007 XO_{15}	8 December 2007	list
(241533) 2010 DA_{34}	21 February 2010	list
(243480) 2009 TQ_{9}	14 October 2009	list
(246173) 2007 RN_{17}	12 September 2007	list
(246283) 2007 TF_{66}	5 October 2007	list
(246381) 2007 UC	16 October 2007	list
(246457) 2007 VU_{244}	14 November 2007	list
(246617) 2008 WX_{2}	19 November 2008	list
(249008) 2007 QJ	16 August 2007	list
(249042) 2007 TO_{71}	15 October 2007	list
(249354) 2008 YX_{7}	22 December 2008	list
(249356) 2008 YZ_{31}	30 December 2008	list
(251383) 2007 VA_{96}	7 November 2007	list
(251388) 2007 VS_{186}	12 November 2007	list
(251408) 2008 AU_{3}	4 January 2008	list
(251438) 2008 CE_{21}	6 February 2008	list
(252107) 2000 WC_{11}	24 November 2000	list
(256646) 2007 WJ_{4}	18 November 2007	list
(256654) 2007 XC_{15}	5 December 2007	list
(256774) 2008 CV_{1}	3 February 2008	list

(263151) 2007 VJ_{245}	14 November 2007	list
(263174) 2007 XA	1 December 2007	list
(263393) 2008 DX_{4}	28 February 2008	list
(263485) 2008 ER_{84}	11 March 2008	list
(266610) 2008 OK_{3}	27 July 2008	list
(266633) 2008 RB_{78}	9 September 2008	list
(266832) 2009 UF_{4}	17 October 2009	list
(266835) 2009 UP_{17}	20 October 2009	list
(269488) 2009 UJ_{18}	17 October 2009	list
(269489) 2009 UY_{20}	22 October 2009	list
(274072) 2007 XM_{17}	8 December 2007	list
(274244) 2008 OL_{3}	27 July 2008	list
(274471) 2008 SX_{82}	26 September 2008	list
(274707) 2008 UG_{100}	27 October 2008	list
(274804) 2008 WV_{127}	20 November 2008	list
(274880) 2009 ST_{14}	18 September 2009	list
(275010) 2009 UO_{4}	18 October 2009	list
(275011) 2009 US_{4}	17 October 2009	list
(275065) 2009 UZ_{128}	29 October 2009	list
(278392) 2007 PN_{25}	13 August 2007	list
(278508) 2008 CU_{1}	3 February 2008	list
(278930) 2008 UO_{7}	26 October 2008	list
(279197) 2009 TZ_{12}	10 October 2009	list
(279349) 2010 AS_{3}	7 January 2010	list
(279372) 2010 AZ_{77}	13 January 2010	list

(281572) 2008 UJ_{100}	27 October 2008	list
(283007) 2007 UF	16 October 2007	list
(283017) 2007 VW_{126}	11 November 2007	list
(283029) 2007 WH_{5}	18 November 2007	list
(283095) 2008 UK_{100}	27 October 2008	list
(283439) 2000 WE_{10}	23 November 2000	list
(284498) 2007 PH_{9}	11 August 2007	list
(284630) 2007 VO_{186}	11 November 2007	list
(284657) 2008 AM_{32}	12 January 2008	list
(284899) 2009 UV_{20}	21 October 2009	list
(284917) 2010 BG_{4}	23 January 2010	list
(293704) 2007 QG	16 August 2007	list
(293706) 2007 QK_{1}	19 August 2007	list
(293727) 2007 RZ_{17}	12 September 2007	list
(293983) 2007 TG_{66}	6 October 2007	list
(293989) 2007 TT_{74}	15 October 2007	list
(293990) 2007 TZ_{74}	15 October 2007	list
(294216) 2007 UM_{4}	16 October 2007	list
(294350) 2007 VR_{94}	7 November 2007	list
(294374) 2007 VV_{125}	7 November 2007	list
(294376) 2007 VR_{126}	11 November 2007	list
(294421) 2007 VQ_{221}	14 November 2007	list
(294430) 2007 VH_{245}	14 November 2007	list
(294479) 2007 WC_{2}	17 November 2007	list
(294488) 2007 WU_{12}	17 November 2007	list

(294503) 2007 XB	1 December 2007	list
(294504) 2007 XC	1 December 2007	list
(294505) 2007 XG	1 December 2007	list
(294516) 2007 XS_{15}	8 December 2007	list
(294578) 2007 YA_{57}	31 December 2007	list
(294620) 2008 AN_{32}	12 January 2008	list
(294660) 2008 AV_{84}	12 January 2008	list
(295929) 2008 XF_{2}	1 December 2008	list
(296205) 2009 CC_{1}	1 February 2009	list
(296206) 2009 CE_{1}	1 February 2009	list
(296889) 2010 BC_{4}	23 January 2010	list
(296890) 2010 BA_{5}	21 January 2010	list
(300612) 2007 UJ_{1}	16 October 2007	list
(300613) 2007 UP_{5}	20 October 2007	list
(300703) 2007 VG_{94}	7 November 2007	list
(300704) 2007 VP_{94}	7 November 2007	list
(300766) 2007 VX_{244}	14 November 2007	list
(300802) 2007 WJ	17 November 2007	list
(300804) 2007 WB_{2}	17 November 2007	list
(300848) 2007 YX_{14}	19 December 2007	list
(300872) 2008 AV_{29}	5 January 2008	list
(301146) 2008 XN_{53}	6 December 2008	list
(304825) 2007 RA_{18}	13 September 2007	list
(305043) 2007 UP_{1}	16 October 2007	list
(305146) 2007 VT_{186}	12 November 2007	list

(305160) 2007 VP_{221}	14 November 2007	list
(305229) 2007 XK_{15}	7 December 2007	list
(305346) 2008 AP_{134}	5 January 2008	list
(305573) 2008 XJ_{3}	6 December 2008	list
(305748) 2009 DS_{3}	16 February 2009	list
(309587) 2008 AJ_{112}	14 January 2008	list
(310597) 2001 WE_{4}	18 November 2001	list
(312191) 2007 VU_{95}	9 November 2007	list
(312379) 2008 EK_{69}	10 March 2008	list
(312444) 2008 JN_{3}	3 May 2008	list
(312491) 2008 YN_{29}	27 December 2008	list
(315344) 2007 UO_{4}	16 October 2007	list
(315388) 2007 VP_{91}	7 November 2007	list
(315419) 2007 VW_{244}	14 November 2007	list
(315435) 2007 VQ_{301}	11 November 2007	list
(315454) 2007 XE_{15}	5 December 2007	list
(315490) 2008 AF	1 January 2008	list
(316131) 2009 SW_{15}	19 September 2009	list
(316156) 2009 UW_{4}	18 October 2009	list
(316259) 2010 OH_{100}	21 July 2010	list
(319909) 2006 XE_{31}	15 December 2006	list
(320431) 2007 VE_{94}	7 November 2007	list
(320443) 2007 VQ_{188}	11 November 2007	list
(320461) 2007 VG_{245}	14 November 2007	list
(320489) 2007 WG_{4}	18 November 2007	list

(320503) 2007 XO_{17}	9 December 2007	list
(321163) 2008 VH_{4}	4 November 2008	list
(321452) 2009 RC_{2}	10 September 2009	list
(321569) 2009 SA_{359}	20 September 2009	list
(324899) 2007 VU_{126}	11 November 2007	list
(324912) 2007 VZ_{244}	14 November 2007	list
(324933) 2007 XU_{15}	8 December 2007	list
(324936) 2007 XP_{23}	9 December 2007	list
(325482) 2009 RM_{6}	15 September 2009	list
(325676) 2009 TL_{13}	15 October 2009	list
(325708) 2009 UX_{89}	26 October 2009	list
(325749) 2009 WC_{53}	22 November 2009	list
(328069) 2007 VF_{245}	14 November 2007	list
(328206) 2008 EJ_{69}	10 March 2008	list
(328470) 2009 CU_{2}	4 February 2009	list
(328531) 2009 RM_{4}	13 September 2009	list
(328711) 2009 TY_{12}	10 October 2009	list
(328775) 2009 UB_{129}	29 October 2009	list
(328788) 2009 UC_{154}	20 October 2009	list
(328789) 2009 UF_{155}	29 October 2009	list
(330832) 2009 FG_{30}	25 March 2009	list
(330871) 2009 RF	9 September 2009	list
(330972) 2009 TC_{1}	10 October 2009	list
(330973) 2009 TH_{1}	10 October 2009	list
(331137) 2010 VR_{119}	26 February 2008	list

(332529) 2008 OJ_{3}	27 July 2008	list
(332755) 2009 UO_{17}	20 October 2009	list
(334695) 2003 CW_{15}	6 February 2003	list
(335923) 2007 TF_{3}	5 October 2007	list
(336466) 2008 VJ_{4}	4 November 2008	list
(341326) 2007 TD_{23}	6 October 2007	list
(341544) 2007 UC_{1}	16 October 2007	list
(341713) 2007 VC_{189}	13 November 2007	list
(341744) 2007 VL_{267}	14 November 2007	list
(341773) 2007 WZ_{1}	17 November 2007	list
(341793) 2007 XL_{10}	5 December 2007	list
(342448) 2008 UA_{100}	27 October 2008	list
(342658) 2008 VC_{4}	4 November 2008	list
(342710) 2008 WR_{2}	18 November 2008	list
(342746) 2008 WV_{62}	21 November 2008	list
(342807) 2008 XO_{1}	2 December 2008	list
(342816) 2008 XV_{6}	6 December 2008	list
(343309) 2010 BZ_{3}	21 January 2010	list
(343310) 2010 BD_{5}	23 January 2010	list
(343425) 2010 DL_{20}	19 February 2010	list
(345858) 2007 PE_{28}	14 August 2007	list
(345865) 2007 QF	16 August 2007	list
(346112) 2007 VF_{94}	7 November 2007	list
(346176) 2007 WA_{2}	17 November 2007	list
(346404) 2008 SB_{152}	26 September 2008	list

(346638) 2008 XH_{3}	6 December 2008	list
(346672) 2008 YL_{29}	27 December 2008	list
(346926) 2010 AS_{2}	7 January 2010	list
(349359) 2007 VK_{190}	14 November 2007	list
(352357) 2007 VA_{185}	11 November 2007	list
(353108) 2009 FV_{1}	17 March 2009	list
(355493) 2007 XD_{15}	5 December 2007	list
(358581) 2007 UD_{5}	19 October 2007	list
(358668) 2007 XE	1 December 2007	list
(359092) 2009 AG_{15}	5 January 2009	list
(361540) 2007 PP_{7}	9 August 2007	list
(361705) 2007 VC_{245}	14 November 2007	list
(361834) 2008 DW_{4}	27 February 2008	list
(365240) 2009 KK_{22}	31 May 2009	list
(365364) 2009 TM_{13}	15 October 2009	list
(367625) 2009 UW_{128}	29 October 2009	list
(367643) 2009 WZ_{52}	22 November 2009	list
(369012) 2007 PG_{29}	15 August 2007	list
(369025) 2007 VE_{267}	14 November 2007	list
(369362) 2009 UW_{20}	22 October 2009	list
(372233) 2008 UF_{100}	27 October 2008	list
(372540) 2009 TN_{9}	14 October 2009	list
(372557) 2009 UG_{4}	17 October 2009	list
(372561) 2009 UM_{17}	20 October 2009	list
(372750) 2010 BT	17 January 2010	list

(375064) 2007 QH	16 August 2007	list
(375126) 2007 VY_{184}	11 November 2007	list
(375127) 2007 VZ_{184}	11 November 2007	list
(375813) 2009 UU_{4}	17 October 2009	list
(375927) 2009 WY_{52}	22 November 2009	list
(376012) 2010 AS_{40}	12 January 2010	list
(379398) 2010 AU_{2}	7 January 2010	list
(379424) 2010 BW	17 January 2010	list
(381294) 2007 UL_{1}	16 October 2007	list
(381508) 2008 SA_{152}	22 September 2008	list
(381571) 2008 UB_{100}	27 October 2008	list
(381622) 2008 XJ_{2}	2 December 2008	list
(381626) 2008 YB	17 December 2008	list
(381630) 2008 YJ_{24}	23 December 2008	list
(381688) 2009 CG_{1}	2 February 2009	list
(381722) 2009 RG	9 September 2009	list
(381780) 2009 TG_{1}	10 October 2009	list
(381895) 2010 BF_{4}	23 January 2010	list
(383756) 2007 VQ_{186}	12 November 2007	list
(384023) 2008 UE_{100}	27 October 2008	list
(384337) 2009 TF_{1}	10 October 2009	list
(384364) 2009 UT_{93}	26 October 2009	list
(384425) 2009 XY_{8}	13 December 2009	list
(384460) 2010 BC_{5}	23 January 2010	list
(386671) 2009 UX_{128}	29 October 2009	list

(386672) 2009 UA_{129}	29 October 2009	list
(388865) 2008 QB_{3}	24 August 2008	list
(389416) 2010 BY	17 January 2010	list
(391594) 2007 UK_{1}	16 October 2007	list
(394539) 2007 UD_{1}	16 October 2007	list
(394593) 2007 VD_{189}	14 November 2007	list
(397602) 2007 VZ_{95}	7 November 2007	list
(397879) 2008 UC_{100}	27 October 2008	list
(400712) 2009 SU_{1}	17 September 2009	list
(402998) 2007 VQ_{243}	11 November 2007	list
(403407) 2009 SQ_{14}	18 September 2009	list
(403517) 2010 AR_{3}	6 January 2010	list
(406542) 2007 WJ_{5}	18 November 2007	list
(407012) 2009 SW_{14}	18 September 2009	list
(407014) 2009 SP_{15}	19 September 2009	list
(407207) 2009 UK_{154}	22 October 2009	list
(410230) 2007 TH_{8}	5 October 2007	list
(410968) 2009 TO_{9}	14 October 2009	list
(411034) 2009 UY_{128}	29 October 2009	list
(411143) 2009 XL	6 December 2009	list
(413969) 2007 DN_{7}	19 February 2007	list
(414491) 2009 RP_{4}	13 September 2009	list
(414506) 2009 SP_{14}	18 September 2009	list
(417884) 2007 QB_{12}	21 August 2007	list
(417956) 2007 TW_{74}	15 October 2007	list

(419169) 2009 TP_{9}	14 October 2009	list
(419170) 2009 TK_{13}	14 October 2009	list
(419422) 2010 BA	16 January 2010	list
(424208) 2007 QY	17 August 2007	list
(424274) 2007 TU_{74}	15 October 2007	list
(424363) 2007 VB_{189}	13 November 2007	list
(424905) 2008 WX_{62}	21 November 2008	list
(425085) 2009 SS_{15}	19 September 2009	list
(425313) 2010 AA_{2}	6 January 2010	list
(428484) 2007 VS_{125}	7 November 2007	list
(429062) 2009 EB_{31}	1 March 2009	list
(431598) 2007 VO_{188}	9 November 2007	list
(432328) 2009 UP_{89}	22 October 2009	list
(435541) 2008 OF_{3}	27 July 2008	list
(436133) 2009 UL_{17}	20 October 2009	list
(436244) 2010 BO_{4}	23 January 2010	list
(441351) 2008 DR_{4}	26 February 2008	list
(441564) 2008 UN_{7}	26 October 2008	list
(441702) 2009 AY	1 January 2009	list
(444854) 2007 VR_{188}	11 November 2007	list
(448225) 2008 VP_{3}	3 November 2008	list
(451135) 2009 QS_{28}	23 August 2009	list
(457499) 2008 VD_{4}	4 November 2008	list
(462682) 2009 UD_{93}	26 October 2009	list
(470818) 2008 WV_{12}	18 November 2008	list

(471102) 2010 BO_{2}	16 January 2010	list
(476764) 2008 UY_{99}	27 October 2008	list
(477361) 2009 US_{93}	26 October 2009	list
(477471) 2010 AG_{2}	7 January 2010	list
(481566) 2007 SV	17 September 2007	list
(482020) 2009 UU_{127}	28 October 2009	list
(482060) 2010 BA_{4}	23 January 2010	list
(482084) 2010 FL_{6}	16 March 2010	list
(485047) 2010 BD_{4}	23 January 2010	list
(489718) 2007 VK_{245}	14 November 2007	list
(490412) 2009 SX_{14}	18 September 2009	list
(504725) 2009 US_{127}	28 October 2009	list
(509563) 2008 CG_{21}	7 February 2008	list
(509991) 2009 UT_{128}	26 October 2009	list
(527655) 2007 WE_{2}	18 November 2007	list
(534665) 2014 UG_{239}	4 November 2010	list
(542669) 2013 GJ_{85}	1 November 2010	list
(546751) 2010 XR_{66}	10 December 2010	list
(547460) 2010 RJ_{165}	9 September 2010	list
(547526) 2010 TA_{12}	11 September 2010	list
(548508) 2010 OJ_{100}	21 July 2010	list
(550966) 2012 UW_{117}	1 December 2007	list
(553578) 2011 SR_{216}	6 September 2011	list
(553641) 2011 UY_{24}	12 November 2007	list
(557041) 2014 SA_{308}	15 September 2009	list

(561887) 2015 VF_{143}	8 December 2007	list
(571430) 2007 QV_{1}	20 August 2007	list
(574509) 2010 RQ_{109}	9 September 2010	list
(577730) 2013 PG_{32}	17 October 2009	list
(579655) 2014 VT_{27}	6 October 2010	list
(584794) 2017 RV_{26}	26 October 2009	list
(592627) 2015 BN_{232}	1 February 2011	list
(599650) 2010 SS_{11}	16 September 2010	list
(601207) 2012 XZ_{150}	7 December 2007	list
(604247) 2015 NM_{16}	10 September 2010	list
(613914) 2007 XK_{10}	5 December 2007	list
(614455) 2009 RP_{6}	15 September 2009	list
(614517) 2009 TJ_{13}	14 October 2009	list
(614534) 2009 UM_{93}	26 October 2009	list
(614566) 2009 WV_{52}	22 November 2009	list
(621655) 2009 UV_{128}	29 October 2009	list
(626819) 2007 XJ_{15}	7 December 2007	list
(627906) 2012 BP_{150}	30 January 2012	list
(633767) 2009 XM	6 December 2009	list
(648199) 2009 RV_{5}	15 September 2009	list
(648444) 2009 UN_{89}	27 October 2009	list
(649054) 2010 VJ_{15}	1 November 2010	list
(649253) 2011 BM_{88}	15 September 2009	list
(655048) 2015 FW_{341}	5 September 2011	list
(663473) 2007 PD_{28}	14 August 2007	list

(663539) 2007 RV_{175}	12 September 2007	list
(663793) 2007 VK_{94}	7 November 2007	list
(667776) 2011 SF_{174}	6 September 2011	list
(669219) 2012 TT_{286}	26 October 2008	list
(670674) 2013 WM_{80}	16 March 2010	list
(672445) 2014 US_{93}	10 December 2010	list
(674604) 2015 RA_{26}	24 January 2010	list
(678955) 2018 CK_{7}	27 December 2008	list
(685520) 2009 UT_{4}	17 October 2009	list
(686199) 2010 SU_{10}	17 September 2010	list
(706769) 2010 TH_{25}	13 September 2010	list
(706896) 2010 VO_{86}	5 November 2010	list
(715964) 2016 AW_{43}	5 February 2011	list
(723840) 2007 QX_{1}	21 August 2007	list
(726600) 2010 BQ_{2}	17 January 2010	list
(729498) 2011 FF_{157}	3 April 2011	list
(729698) 2011 MA_{4}	24 January 2010	list
(733680) 2014 TF_{59}	19 October 2007	list
(742690) 2007 VR_{186}	12 November 2007	list
(744626) 2009 UG_{14}	20 October 2009	list
(752869) 2015 TD_{230}	9 September 2009	list
(760547) 2008 WX_{12}	19 November 2008	list
(761350) 2009 UH_{18}	17 October 2009	list
(767302) 2014 TM_{81}	11 October 2009	list
(768910) 2015 FP_{333}	3 February 2011	list

(776339) 2007 VL_{245}	14 November 2007	list
(777860) 2009 RH_{4}	10 September 2009	list
(796265) 2009 SM_{14}	18 September 2009	list
(796763) 2010 RR_{175}	9 September 2010	list
(796981) 2010 VK_{182}	1 November 2010	list
(797908) 2011 WF_{165}	20 November 2011	list
(815701) 2010 PG_{63}	8 August 2010	list
(819315) 2014 HX_{44}	5 September 2011	list
(831617) 2009 UM_{89}	22 October 2009	list
(831618) 2009 UO_{89}	22 October 2009	list
(831620) 2009 UH_{93}	26 October 2009	list
(839625) 2014 SK_{45}	22 October 2009	list
(854757) 2010 TN_{38}	6 October 2010	list
(856144) 2011 SB_{34}	6 September 2011	list
(870328) 2016 YS_{11}	18 December 2012	list
Discoveries are credited by the MPC with "BATTeRS"

== See also ==
- Japan Spaceguard Association
- List of minor planet discoverers § Discovering dedicated institutions
