= Siege of Arai =

Japanese military operation in 1516

Coordinates: 35°9′35″N 139°36′46″E

- Part of the Sengoku period
Date	July 11, 1516
Location	Arai castle, Sagami Province
Result	Hōjō victory

Belligerents
Miura clan Uesugi clan	forces of Hōjō Soun

Commanders and leaders
Miura Yoshiatsu †; Miura Yoshimoto †; Uesugi Tomooki	Hōjō Soun

Strength
6,000	9,000

The siege of Arai (新井城の戦い) was among the first steps taken by Hōjō Sōun towards becoming one of the most powerful warlords of Japan's Sengoku period. After attacking Kamakura in 1512, Hōjō turned to Arai castle, on Miura Peninsula, to the south, which was controlled by Miura Yoshiatsu.

Miura Yoshiatsu's son Yoshimoto, believing defeat to be inevitable, killed himself by chopping off his own head.
