= Yoshii, Okayama (Shitsuki) =

Dissolved municipality in Okayama prefecture, Japan

Yoshii (芳井町, Yoshii-chō) was a town located in Shitsuki District, Okayama Prefecture, Japan.

As of 2003, the town had an estimated population of 5,736 and a density of 71.07 persons per km^{2}. The total area was 80.71 km^{2}.

On March 1, 2005, Yoshii, along with the town of Bisei (from Oda District), was merged into the expanded city of Ibara.
