= Hōjō Sōun =

Japanese daimyo of the early Sengoku period

- 北条 早雲
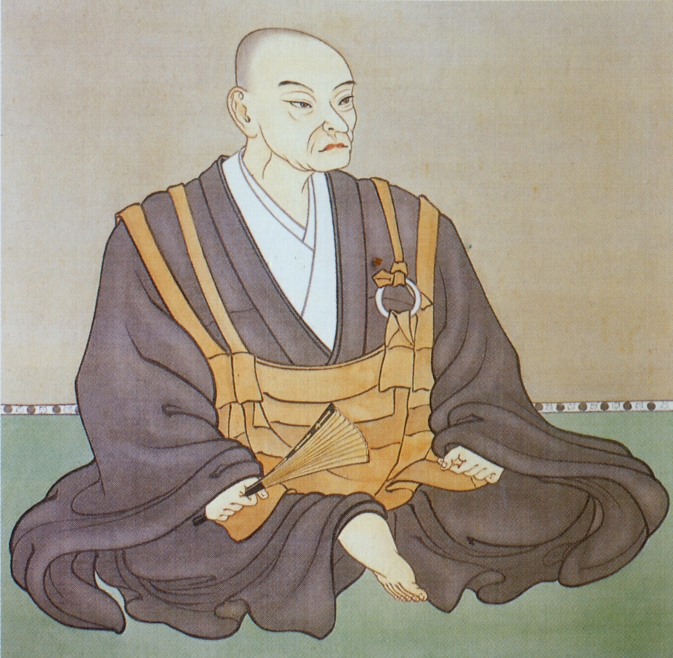

Head of Later Hōjō clan
- In office 1493–1518
- Succeeded by: Hōjō Ujitsuna

Personal details
- Born: 1432 or 1456 Takakoshi Castle, Ibara
- Died: September 8, 1519 Nirayama Castle, Izu Province, Japan
- Children: Hōjō Ujitsuna; Hōjō Genan
- Parent: Ise Morisada (father)

Military service
- Allegiance: Imagawa clan Later Hōjō clan
- Rank: Lord (Daimyō)
- Commands: Kōkokuji Castle; Nirayama Castle
- Battles/wars: Izu campaign Siege of Arai (1516)

Ise Sōzui (伊勢 宗瑞; 1432 or 1456 – September 8, 1519), also known as Hōjō Sōun (北条 早雲), was a Japanese daimyo and the first head of the Later Hōjō clan, one of the major powers in Japan's Sengoku period. He belonged to a cadet branch of the Ise family. The Hōjō surname was adopted by his son Ujitsuna in 1523, after Sōun's death.

== Biography ==
Traditionally Soun held a reputation of a rōnin who rose to power almost overnight in Kantō; however, he belonged to a prestigious family in the direct employment of the Ashikaga shogunate, and enjoyed important family connections. It has been said that Sōun was born at the Takakoshi castle in Okayama. His sister was married to Imagawa Yoshitada, a major daimyō from a prestigious cadet branch of the Ashikaga family.

In 1483, Ise Moritoki became a member of the mōshitsugishū (shogunal liaison officials) in the service of Shōgun Ashikaga Yoshihisa.

About 1475, under the cognomen of Ise Shinkuro, he worked for Imagawa, the constable of Suruga Province, and eventually became an "independent leader" with a number of warriors joining him.

Following Imagawa Yoshitada's death in 1476, Moritoki supported his nephew Ryūōmaru, later known as Imagawa Ujichika, in the succession dispute with Oshika Norimitsu and mediated between the two sides. In 1487, operating from Ishiwaki Castle, he attacked the Imagawa residence and defeated Norimitsu, enabling Ujichika to assume leadership of the clan. Sōun was rewarded by Ujichika with Kōkokuji Castle.

In 1493, Moritoki invaded Izu Province and attacked Ashikaga Chachamaru at the Horigoe residence. The conquest of the province took several years, during which he established his headquarters at Nirayama Castle. With Sōun's successful invasion in Izu province, he is credited by most historians as being the first "Sengoku daimyō".

After building a stronghold at Nirayama, Hōjō Sōun secured Odawara Castle in 1494, the castle which would become the center of the Hōjō family's domains for nearly a century. In an act of treachery, he seized the castle after arranging for its lord to be murdered while out hunting.

In 1516, he laid siege to the castle of Arai, and "was virtual master of all Sagami".

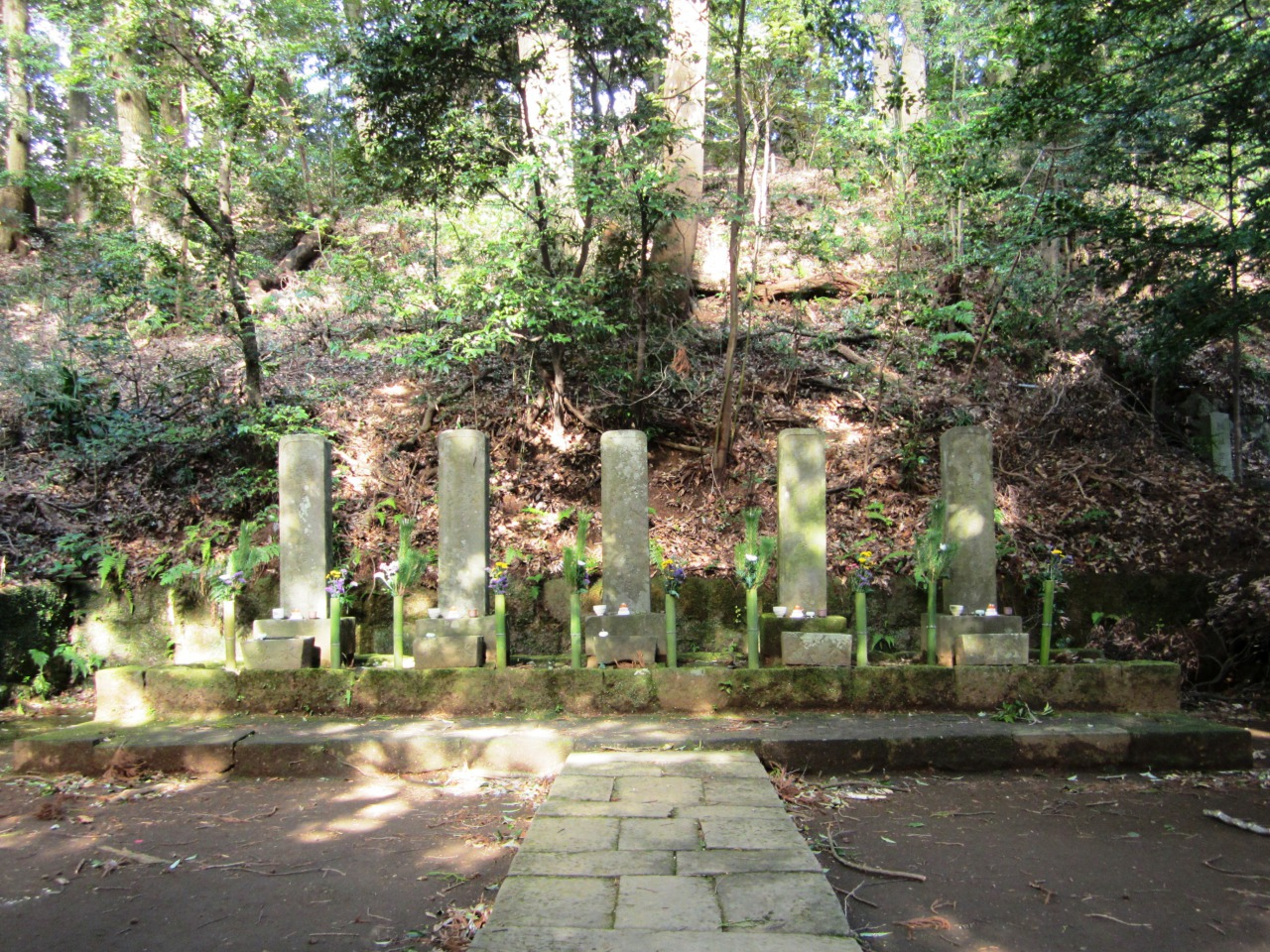
Tomb of Hōjō Sōun at Sōun-ji Temple

In 1518, Sōun transferred leadership of the clan to his son Ujitsuna. He died at Nirayama Castle in 1519. Ujitsuna changed the clan's surname from Ise to Hōjō in 1523. In 1521, Ujitsuna built Sōun-ji temple dedicated to his father.

== Family ==
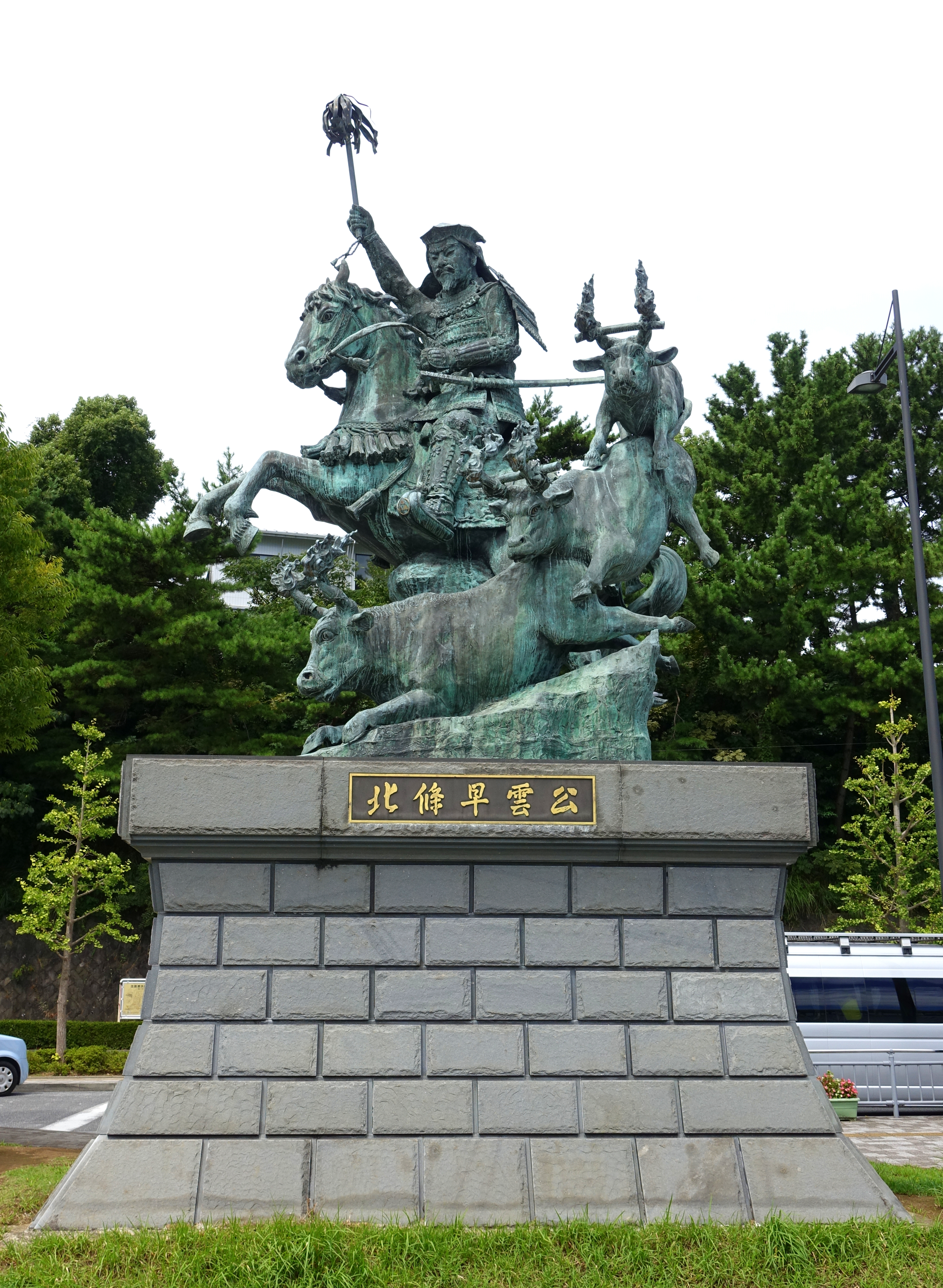
Statue of Hōjō Sōun

- Father: Ise Morisada
- Mother: Daughter of Isa Sadanori
- Adoptive father: Ise Sadamichi
- Wife: Nan’yoin-dono
- Concubines:
  - Katsurayama-dono
  - Kennyoji-dono
- Children:
  - Hōjō Ujitsuna by Nan’yoin-dono
  - Hojo Ujitoki (d.1531) by Nan’yoin-dono
  - Katsurayama Ujihiro (d.1538/1539) by Katsurayama-dono
  - Chosoin-dono married Miura Ujiin by Kennyoji-dono
  - Hōjō Genan (1493-1589) by Kennyoji-dono
  - Seishoin-dono by Kennyoji-dono
