= Bisei, Okayama =

Dissolved municipality in Okayama prefecture, Japan

Bisei (美星町, Bisei-chō) was a town located in Oda District, Okayama Prefecture, Japan.

As of 2003, the town had an estimated population of 5,421 and a density of 74.57 persons per km^{2}. The total area was 72.70 km^{2}.

On March 1, 2005, Bisei, along with the town of Yoshii (from Shitsuki District), was merged into the expanded city of Ibara.

Bisei was known for the Bisei Spaceguard Center.
