= Shitsuki District, Okayama =

Former district in Okayama prefecture, Japan

Shitsuki (後月郡, Shitsuki-gun) was a district located in Okayama Prefecture, Japan.

As of 2003, the district had an estimated population of 5,736 and a density of 71.07 persons per km^{2}. The total area was 80.71 km^{2}.

== Towns and villages ==
- Yoshii

== Merger ==
- On March 1, 2005 - the town of Yoshii along with the town of Bisei (from Oda District), was merged into the expanded city of Ibara.
