= Oda District, Okayama =

District in Okayama Prefecture, Japan

Location of Oda District in Okayama Prefecture

Oda (小田郡, Oda-gun) is a district located in Okayama Prefecture, Japan.

As of 2003, the district has an estimated population of 21,285 and a population density of 130.33 persons per km^{2}. The total area is 163.32 km^{2}.

== Towns and villages ==
- Yakage

== Merger ==
- On March 1, 2005, the town of Bisei merged into the city of Ibara.
