= List of minor planets: 856001–857000 =

The following is a partial list of minor planets, running from minor-planet number 856001 through 857000, inclusive. The primary data for this and other partial lists is based on JPL's "Small-Body Orbital Elements" and data available from the Minor Planet Center. Critical list information is also provided by the MPC, unless otherwise specified from Lowell Observatory. A detailed description of the table's columns and additional sources are given on the main page including a complete list of every page in this series, and a statistical break-up on the dynamical classification of minor planets.

Also see the summary list of all named bodies in numerical and alphabetical order, and the corresponding naming citations for the number range of this particular list. New namings may only be added to this list after official publication, as the preannouncement of names is condemned by the Working Group for Small Bodies Nomenclature of the International Astronomical Union.

Near-Earth obj.	MBA (inner)	MBA (outer)	Centaur
Mars-crosser	MBA (middle)	Jupiter trojan	Trans-Neptunian obj.
Unclassified

== 856001–856100 ==
Designation			Discovery			Properties		Ref
Permanent	Provisional	Named after	Date	Site	Discoverer(s)	Category	Diam.	Ref
856001	2011 QF_{32}	—	August 23, 2011	Haleakala	Pan-STARRS 1	·	660 m	MPC · JPL
856002	2011 QT_{36}	—	August 27, 2011	Haleakala	Pan-STARRS 1	·	2.2 km	MPC · JPL
856003	2011 QN_{38}	—	August 24, 2011	Haleakala	Pan-STARRS 1	L5	5.7 km	MPC · JPL
856004	2011 QE_{39}	—	June 26, 2011	Mount Lemmon	Mount Lemmon Survey	NYS	880 m	MPC · JPL
856005	2011 QC_{41}	—	August 28, 2011	Črni Vrh	Mikuž, B.	·	1.3 km	MPC · JPL
856006	2011 QO_{42}	—	August 23, 2011	Haleakala	Pan-STARRS 1	TIR	2.3 km	MPC · JPL
856007	2011 QW_{50}	—	June 26, 2011	Mount Lemmon	Mount Lemmon Survey	·	1.2 km	MPC · JPL
856008	2011 QK_{51}	—	August 31, 2011	Haleakala	Pan-STARRS 1	H	340 m	MPC · JPL
856009	2011 QN_{52}	—	June 26, 2011	Mount Lemmon	Mount Lemmon Survey	NYS	880 m	MPC · JPL
856010	2011 QN_{54}	—	September 12, 2007	Catalina	CSS	BRG	1.2 km	MPC · JPL
856011	2011 QE_{56}	—	August 28, 2011	Haleakala	Pan-STARRS 1	·	830 m	MPC · JPL
856012	2011 QT_{56}	—	August 28, 2011	Haleakala	Pan-STARRS 1	·	880 m	MPC · JPL
856013	2011 QT_{59}	—	August 20, 2011	Haleakala	Pan-STARRS 1	·	2.2 km	MPC · JPL
856014	2011 QG_{60}	—	August 30, 2011	Haleakala	Pan-STARRS 1	LIX	2.5 km	MPC · JPL
856015	2011 QP_{60}	—	August 30, 2011	Haleakala	Pan-STARRS 1	·	2.1 km	MPC · JPL
856016	2011 QD_{62}	—	August 31, 2011	Haleakala	Pan-STARRS 1	·	960 m	MPC · JPL
856017	2011 QU_{63}	—	August 31, 2011	Haleakala	Pan-STARRS 1	·	1.4 km	MPC · JPL
856018	2011 QS_{64}	—	August 23, 2011	Haleakala	Pan-STARRS 1	·	870 m	MPC · JPL
856019	2011 QN_{67}	—	August 28, 2011	Haleakala	Pan-STARRS 1	·	1.1 km	MPC · JPL
856020	2011 QG_{73}	—	August 19, 2011	Haleakala	Pan-STARRS 1	·	1.2 km	MPC · JPL
856021	2011 QE_{78}	—	August 23, 2011	Haleakala	Pan-STARRS 1	NYS	950 m	MPC · JPL
856022	2011 QC_{81}	—	August 24, 2011	Haleakala	Pan-STARRS 1	·	1.7 km	MPC · JPL
856023	2011 QA_{84}	—	October 8, 2007	Mount Lemmon	Mount Lemmon Survey	·	1.2 km	MPC · JPL
856024	2011 QA_{85}	—	August 24, 2011	Haleakala	Pan-STARRS 1	·	2.2 km	MPC · JPL
856025	2011 QO_{85}	—	July 27, 2011	Haleakala	Pan-STARRS 1	(18466)	1.8 km	MPC · JPL
856026	2011 QU_{85}	—	October 30, 2008	Kitt Peak	Spacewatch	·	500 m	MPC · JPL
856027	2011 QS_{89}	—	August 28, 2011	Haleakala	Pan-STARRS 1	·	1.3 km	MPC · JPL
856028	2011 QC_{92}	—	August 30, 2011	Haleakala	Pan-STARRS 1	·	870 m	MPC · JPL
856029	2011 QQ_{93}	—	August 30, 2011	La Sagra	OAM	·	950 m	MPC · JPL
856030	2011 QT_{93}	—	August 31, 2011	La Sagra	OAM	·	1.0 km	MPC · JPL
856031	2011 QH_{96}	—	August 20, 2011	Haleakala	Pan-STARRS 1	·	1.3 km	MPC · JPL
856032	2011 QY_{96}	—	August 27, 2011	Haleakala	Pan-STARRS 1	·	920 m	MPC · JPL
856033	2011 QN_{97}	—	August 31, 2011	Haleakala	Pan-STARRS 1	·	1.4 km	MPC · JPL
856034	2011 QN_{98}	—	August 23, 2011	Cerro Burek	I. de la Cueva	·	470 m	MPC · JPL
856035	2011 QO_{102}	—	August 17, 2011	Haleakala	Pan-STARRS 1	·	560 m	MPC · JPL
856036	2011 QS_{103}	—	February 7, 2013	Catalina	CSS	·	1.6 km	MPC · JPL
856037	2011 QE_{104}	—	August 30, 2011	Piszkéstető	K. Sárneczky	·	2.3 km	MPC · JPL
856038	2011 QO_{107}	—	August 24, 2011	Haleakala	Pan-STARRS 1	V	380 m	MPC · JPL
856039	2011 QS_{108}	—	August 24, 2011	Siding Spring	SSS	·	2.3 km	MPC · JPL
856040	2011 QZ_{108}	—	August 30, 2011	Haleakala	Pan-STARRS 1	·	840 m	MPC · JPL
856041	2011 QW_{109}	—	August 23, 2011	Haleakala	Pan-STARRS 1	·	1.3 km	MPC · JPL
856042	2011 QY_{109}	—	August 24, 2011	Haleakala	Pan-STARRS 1	·	570 m	MPC · JPL
856043	2011 QB_{110}	—	August 27, 2011	Haleakala	Pan-STARRS 1	HOF	1.9 km	MPC · JPL
856044	2011 QC_{110}	—	August 23, 2011	Haleakala	Pan-STARRS 1	·	790 m	MPC · JPL
856045	2011 QQ_{110}	—	August 31, 2011	Haleakala	Pan-STARRS 1	·	940 m	MPC · JPL
856046	2011 QW_{110}	—	August 24, 2011	Haleakala	Pan-STARRS 1	·	1.6 km	MPC · JPL
856047	2011 QC_{111}	—	August 30, 2011	Haleakala	Pan-STARRS 1	·	550 m	MPC · JPL
856048	2011 QD_{111}	—	August 26, 2011	Kitt Peak	Spacewatch	·	900 m	MPC · JPL
856049	2011 QF_{111}	—	August 23, 2011	Haleakala	Pan-STARRS 1	·	1.3 km	MPC · JPL
856050	2011 QH_{111}	—	August 24, 2011	Haleakala	Pan-STARRS 1	·	1.0 km	MPC · JPL
856051	2011 QL_{111}	—	August 24, 2011	Haleakala	Pan-STARRS 1	AGN	860 m	MPC · JPL
856052	2011 QM_{111}	—	August 27, 2011	Haleakala	Pan-STARRS 1	AGN	850 m	MPC · JPL
856053	2011 QU_{111}	—	August 23, 2011	Haleakala	Pan-STARRS 1	·	1.5 km	MPC · JPL
856054	2011 QO_{112}	—	August 20, 2011	Haleakala	Pan-STARRS 1	GEF	770 m	MPC · JPL
856055	2011 QP_{112}	—	August 27, 2011	Haleakala	Pan-STARRS 1	·	1.5 km	MPC · JPL
856056	2011 QN_{113}	—	August 31, 2011	Haleakala	Pan-STARRS 1	H	360 m	MPC · JPL
856057	2011 QV_{113}	—	August 29, 2011	Siding Spring	SSS	·	650 m	MPC · JPL
856058	2011 QZ_{113}	—	August 31, 2011	Haleakala	Pan-STARRS 1	·	700 m	MPC · JPL
856059	2011 QA_{114}	—	August 31, 2011	Piszkéstető	K. Sárneczky	JUN	800 m	MPC · JPL
856060	2011 QL_{114}	—	August 24, 2011	Haleakala	Pan-STARRS 1	·	1.5 km	MPC · JPL
856061	2011 QJ_{115}	—	August 23, 2011	Haleakala	Pan-STARRS 1	L5	6.2 km	MPC · JPL
856062	2011 QA_{117}	—	August 18, 2006	Kitt Peak	Spacewatch	H	390 m	MPC · JPL
856063	2011 QE_{117}	—	August 23, 2011	Haleakala	Pan-STARRS 1	(2076)	650 m	MPC · JPL
856064	2011 QL_{119}	—	August 30, 2011	Haleakala	Pan-STARRS 1	V	370 m	MPC · JPL
856065	2011 RU_{1}	—	August 20, 2011	Haleakala	Pan-STARRS 1	·	1.4 km	MPC · JPL
856066	2011 RZ_{2}	—	September 4, 2011	Haleakala	Pan-STARRS 1	·	1.1 km	MPC · JPL
856067	2011 RH_{3}	—	September 4, 2011	Haleakala	Pan-STARRS 1	MRX	590 m	MPC · JPL
856068	2011 RM_{6}	—	September 5, 2011	Haleakala	Pan-STARRS 1	TIN	580 m	MPC · JPL
856069	2011 RD_{8}	—	September 5, 2011	Haleakala	Pan-STARRS 1	·	570 m	MPC · JPL
856070	2011 RA_{10}	—	September 22, 2001	Kitt Peak	Spacewatch	·	440 m	MPC · JPL
856071	2011 RK_{10}	—	September 2, 2011	Haleakala	Pan-STARRS 1	DOR	1.4 km	MPC · JPL
856072	2011 RS_{11}	—	September 4, 2011	Haleakala	Pan-STARRS 1	·	790 m	MPC · JPL
856073	2011 RZ_{13}	—	August 20, 2011	Haleakala	Pan-STARRS 1	·	710 m	MPC · JPL
856074	2011 RJ_{15}	—	August 30, 2011	Haleakala	Pan-STARRS 1	·	1.3 km	MPC · JPL
856075	2011 RL_{15}	—	August 30, 2011	Kitt Peak	Spacewatch	·	1.1 km	MPC · JPL
856076	2011 RT_{15}	—	August 30, 2011	Haleakala	Pan-STARRS 1	·	950 m	MPC · JPL
856077	2011 RE_{20}	—	September 5, 2011	Haleakala	Pan-STARRS 1	·	860 m	MPC · JPL
856078	2011 RV_{20}	—	September 2, 2011	Haleakala	Pan-STARRS 1	·	1.3 km	MPC · JPL
856079	2011 RY_{20}	—	September 2, 2011	Haleakala	Pan-STARRS 1	·	1.4 km	MPC · JPL
856080	2011 RX_{22}	—	September 4, 2011	Haleakala	Pan-STARRS 1	·	1.5 km	MPC · JPL
856081	2011 RC_{23}	—	September 4, 2011	Haleakala	Pan-STARRS 1	·	1.7 km	MPC · JPL
856082	2011 RJ_{23}	—	September 4, 2011	Haleakala	Pan-STARRS 1	·	680 m	MPC · JPL
856083	2011 RR_{23}	—	September 4, 2011	Haleakala	Pan-STARRS 1	·	1.2 km	MPC · JPL
856084	2011 RC_{24}	—	September 4, 2011	Haleakala	Pan-STARRS 1	·	2.2 km	MPC · JPL
856085	2011 RD_{24}	—	September 2, 2011	Haleakala	Pan-STARRS 1	·	1.4 km	MPC · JPL
856086	2011 RE_{24}	—	September 4, 2011	Haleakala	Pan-STARRS 1	·	690 m	MPC · JPL
856087	2011 RZ_{24}	—	September 4, 2011	Haleakala	Pan-STARRS 1	·	590 m	MPC · JPL
856088	2011 RA_{25}	—	September 4, 2011	Haleakala	Pan-STARRS 1	·	840 m	MPC · JPL
856089	2011 RB_{25}	—	September 2, 2011	Haleakala	Pan-STARRS 1	3:2	3.9 km	MPC · JPL
856090	2011 RG_{25}	—	September 4, 2011	Haleakala	Pan-STARRS 1	·	760 m	MPC · JPL
856091	2011 RS_{25}	—	August 26, 2011	Kitt Peak	Spacewatch	·	460 m	MPC · JPL
856092	2011 RV_{25}	—	September 4, 2011	Haleakala	Pan-STARRS 1	V	450 m	MPC · JPL
856093	2011 RT_{26}	—	September 8, 2011	Kitt Peak	Spacewatch	·	710 m	MPC · JPL
856094	2011 RE_{27}	—	September 4, 2011	Haleakala	Pan-STARRS 1	·	1.3 km	MPC · JPL
856095	2011 RB_{28}	—	September 2, 2011	Haleakala	Pan-STARRS 1	·	620 m	MPC · JPL
856096	2011 RF_{28}	—	September 4, 2011	Haleakala	Pan-STARRS 1	URS	2.3 km	MPC · JPL
856097	2011 RG_{28}	—	September 8, 2011	Kitt Peak	Spacewatch	·	520 m	MPC · JPL
856098	2011 RU_{28}	—	September 8, 2011	Kitt Peak	Spacewatch	·	860 m	MPC · JPL
856099	2011 RA_{29}	—	September 4, 2011	Haleakala	Pan-STARRS 1	AGN	700 m	MPC · JPL
856100	2011 RG_{29}	—	September 4, 2011	Haleakala	Pan-STARRS 1	HOF	1.9 km	MPC · JPL

== 856101–856200 ==
back to top

Designation			Discovery			Properties		Ref
Permanent	Provisional	Named after	Date	Site	Discoverer(s)	Category	Diam.	Ref
856101	2011 RK_{29}	—	September 23, 2011	Haleakala	Pan-STARRS 1	DOR	1.3 km	MPC · JPL
856102	2011 RM_{29}	—	September 4, 2011	Haleakala	Pan-STARRS 1	HOF	1.8 km	MPC · JPL
856103	2011 RP_{29}	—	September 4, 2011	Haleakala	Pan-STARRS 1	·	1.4 km	MPC · JPL
856104	2011 RT_{29}	—	September 7, 2011	Kitt Peak	Spacewatch	·	1.5 km	MPC · JPL
856105	2011 RX_{29}	—	September 9, 2011	Kitt Peak	Spacewatch	·	1.4 km	MPC · JPL
856106	2011 RB_{30}	—	September 4, 2011	Haleakala	Pan-STARRS 1	AEO	840 m	MPC · JPL
856107	2011 RJ_{30}	—	September 4, 2011	Haleakala	Pan-STARRS 1	·	1.3 km	MPC · JPL
856108	2011 RY_{30}	—	September 4, 2011	Haleakala	Pan-STARRS 1	·	1.2 km	MPC · JPL
856109	2011 RG_{31}	—	September 4, 2011	Kitt Peak	Spacewatch	·	1.2 km	MPC · JPL
856110	2011 RJ_{31}	—	September 8, 2011	Kitt Peak	Spacewatch	TIN	690 m	MPC · JPL
856111	2011 RR_{31}	—	September 4, 2011	Haleakala	Pan-STARRS 1	AEO	780 m	MPC · JPL
856112	2011 RV_{32}	—	September 4, 2011	Haleakala	Pan-STARRS 1	·	1.1 km	MPC · JPL
856113	2011 RA_{33}	—	September 4, 2011	Haleakala	Pan-STARRS 1	AEO	780 m	MPC · JPL
856114	2011 RO_{33}	—	September 4, 2011	Haleakala	Pan-STARRS 1	H	420 m	MPC · JPL
856115	2011 RZ_{33}	—	September 2, 2011	Haleakala	Pan-STARRS 1	·	1.8 km	MPC · JPL
856116	2011 RH_{36}	—	September 2, 2011	Haleakala	Pan-STARRS 1	·	450 m	MPC · JPL
856117	2011 RO_{37}	—	September 2, 2011	Haleakala	Pan-STARRS 1	H	340 m	MPC · JPL
856118	2011 RN_{38}	—	September 4, 2011	Haleakala	Pan-STARRS 1	·	920 m	MPC · JPL
856119	2011 RT_{40}	—	September 4, 2011	Haleakala	Pan-STARRS 1	EOS	1.2 km	MPC · JPL
856120	2011 RX_{40}	—	September 2, 2011	Haleakala	Pan-STARRS 1	EOS	1.4 km	MPC · JPL
856121	2011 SZ	—	November 1, 2008	Mount Lemmon	Mount Lemmon Survey	·	490 m	MPC · JPL
856122	2011 SD_{4}	—	September 18, 2011	Haleakala	Pan-STARRS 1	·	930 m	MPC · JPL
856123	2011 SQ_{6}	—	September 2, 2011	Haleakala	Pan-STARRS 1	GEF	730 m	MPC · JPL
856124	2011 SY_{7}	—	September 7, 2004	Kitt Peak	Spacewatch	·	620 m	MPC · JPL
856125	2011 SY_{9}	—	September 18, 1998	Kitt Peak	Spacewatch	·	430 m	MPC · JPL
856126	2011 SL_{10}	—	September 2, 2011	Haleakala	Pan-STARRS 1	·	1.4 km	MPC · JPL
856127	2011 SU_{10}	—	September 19, 2011	Mount Lemmon	Mount Lemmon Survey	AEO	850 m	MPC · JPL
856128	2011 SZ_{11}	—	September 19, 2011	Mount Lemmon	Mount Lemmon Survey	WIT	740 m	MPC · JPL
856129	2011 ST_{14}	—	September 19, 2011	Mount Lemmon	Mount Lemmon Survey	·	780 m	MPC · JPL
856130	2011 SF_{15}	—	September 19, 2011	Mount Lemmon	Mount Lemmon Survey	V	440 m	MPC · JPL
856131	2011 SS_{15}	—	September 19, 2006	Kitt Peak	Spacewatch	AEG	1.8 km	MPC · JPL
856132	2011 SD_{16}	—	September 19, 2011	Haleakala	Pan-STARRS 1	H	390 m	MPC · JPL
856133	2011 SV_{17}	—	September 19, 2011	Mount Lemmon	Mount Lemmon Survey	·	1.5 km	MPC · JPL
856134	2011 SD_{18}	—	September 19, 2011	Mount Lemmon	Mount Lemmon Survey	·	1.2 km	MPC · JPL
856135	2011 ST_{19}	—	September 19, 2011	Mount Lemmon	Mount Lemmon Survey	·	1.1 km	MPC · JPL
856136	2011 SF_{20}	—	September 20, 2011	Haleakala	Pan-STARRS 1	·	2.0 km	MPC · JPL
856137	2011 SW_{20}	—	September 20, 2011	Haleakala	Pan-STARRS 1	·	1.6 km	MPC · JPL
856138	2011 SU_{21}	—	September 20, 2011	Haleakala	Pan-STARRS 1	H	460 m	MPC · JPL
856139	2011 SM_{22}	—	September 20, 2011	Haleakala	Pan-STARRS 1	·	2.0 km	MPC · JPL
856140	2011 SC_{23}	—	September 18, 2011	Mount Lemmon	Mount Lemmon Survey	HYG	2.0 km	MPC · JPL
856141	2011 SM_{25}	—	September 21, 2011	Catalina	CSS	DOR	1.9 km	MPC · JPL
856142	2011 SL_{28}	—	October 4, 2002	Socorro	LINEAR	·	1.8 km	MPC · JPL
856143	2011 SC_{31}	—	September 11, 2004	Kitt Peak	Spacewatch	·	600 m	MPC · JPL
856144	2011 SB_{34}	—	September 6, 2011	Bisei	BATTeRS	H	430 m	MPC · JPL
856145	2011 SJ_{35}	—	September 20, 2011	Kitt Peak	Spacewatch	·	660 m	MPC · JPL
856146	2011 SL_{36}	—	September 20, 2011	Kitt Peak	Spacewatch	·	460 m	MPC · JPL
856147	2011 SN_{36}	—	September 20, 2011	Kitt Peak	Spacewatch	·	770 m	MPC · JPL
856148	2011 SY_{39}	—	September 21, 2003	Kitt Peak	Spacewatch	T_{j} (2.96)	2.7 km	MPC · JPL
856149	2011 SC_{41}	—	September 2, 2011	Haleakala	Pan-STARRS 1	·	670 m	MPC · JPL
856150	2011 SR_{43}	—	September 2, 2011	Haleakala	Pan-STARRS 1	·	1.4 km	MPC · JPL
856151	2011 ST_{43}	—	September 18, 2011	Mount Lemmon	Mount Lemmon Survey	AGN	790 m	MPC · JPL
856152	2011 SW_{48}	—	October 16, 2007	Mount Lemmon	Mount Lemmon Survey	·	1.1 km	MPC · JPL
856153	2011 SY_{48}	—	September 2, 2011	Haleakala	Pan-STARRS 1	·	1.2 km	MPC · JPL
856154	2011 SZ_{48}	—	September 20, 2011	Mount Lemmon	Mount Lemmon Survey	·	1.5 km	MPC · JPL
856155	2011 SU_{52}	—	September 23, 2011	Mount Lemmon	Mount Lemmon Survey	·	530 m	MPC · JPL
856156	2011 SK_{59}	—	September 18, 2011	Mount Lemmon	Mount Lemmon Survey	·	880 m	MPC · JPL
856157	2011 ST_{61}	—	September 2, 2011	Haleakala	Pan-STARRS 1	·	1.4 km	MPC · JPL
856158	2011 SC_{62}	—	September 18, 2011	Mount Lemmon	Mount Lemmon Survey	·	950 m	MPC · JPL
856159	2011 SK_{62}	—	September 2, 2011	Haleakala	Pan-STARRS 1	·	460 m	MPC · JPL
856160	2011 SB_{65}	—	November 6, 2008	Mount Lemmon	Mount Lemmon Survey	·	550 m	MPC · JPL
856161	2011 SG_{65}	—	September 24, 2011	Drebach	G. Lehmann, ~Knöfel, A.	·	1.3 km	MPC · JPL
856162	2011 SD_{66}	—	September 4, 2011	Haleakala	Pan-STARRS 1	·	1.4 km	MPC · JPL
856163	2011 SB_{70}	—	September 24, 2011	Haleakala	Pan-STARRS 1	KON	1.4 km	MPC · JPL
856164	2011 SM_{73}	—	September 19, 2011	Mount Lemmon	Mount Lemmon Survey	MRX	750 m	MPC · JPL
856165	2011 ST_{74}	—	September 19, 2011	Haleakala	Pan-STARRS 1	·	2.2 km	MPC · JPL
856166	2011 SZ_{74}	—	September 4, 2011	Haleakala	Pan-STARRS 1	KON	1.4 km	MPC · JPL
856167	2011 SJ_{76}	—	September 4, 2011	Haleakala	Pan-STARRS 1	·	1.2 km	MPC · JPL
856168	2011 SZ_{76}	—	September 4, 2011	Haleakala	Pan-STARRS 1	·	1.3 km	MPC · JPL
856169	2011 SF_{78}	—	September 4, 2011	Haleakala	Pan-STARRS 1	·	730 m	MPC · JPL
856170	2011 SG_{79}	—	November 5, 2007	Mount Lemmon	Mount Lemmon Survey	·	1.0 km	MPC · JPL
856171	2011 SR_{79}	—	September 20, 2011	Mount Lemmon	Mount Lemmon Survey	AGN	920 m	MPC · JPL
856172	2011 SA_{81}	—	September 20, 2011	Mount Lemmon	Mount Lemmon Survey	·	1.3 km	MPC · JPL
856173 Rozenštrauhs	2011 SF_{81}	Rozenštrauhs	September 3, 2011	Baldone	K. Černis, I. Eglītis	·	770 m	MPC · JPL
856174	2011 SG_{83}	—	September 21, 2011	Kachina	Hobart, J.	H	330 m	MPC · JPL
856175	2011 SE_{85}	—	September 21, 2011	Kitt Peak	Spacewatch	·	1.3 km	MPC · JPL
856176	2011 SX_{85}	—	September 21, 2011	Kitt Peak	Spacewatch	·	1.1 km	MPC · JPL
856177	2011 SV_{88}	—	September 9, 2004	Sacramento Peak	SDSS Collaboration	·	530 m	MPC · JPL
856178	2011 SW_{88}	—	September 22, 2011	Kitt Peak	Spacewatch	AGN	820 m	MPC · JPL
856179	2011 ST_{90}	—	September 22, 2011	Kitt Peak	Spacewatch	SUL	1.6 km	MPC · JPL
856180	2011 SB_{92}	—	September 22, 2011	Kitt Peak	Spacewatch	·	1.9 km	MPC · JPL
856181	2011 SS_{94}	—	September 24, 2011	Mount Lemmon	Mount Lemmon Survey	·	500 m	MPC · JPL
856182	2011 SQ_{95}	—	September 24, 2011	Mount Lemmon	Mount Lemmon Survey	·	1.0 km	MPC · JPL
856183	2011 SX_{97}	—	September 21, 2011	Kitt Peak	Spacewatch	KOR	930 m	MPC · JPL
856184	2011 SX_{98}	—	September 23, 2011	Mount Lemmon	Mount Lemmon Survey	·	590 m	MPC · JPL
856185	2011 SP_{100}	—	September 24, 2011	Mount Lemmon	Mount Lemmon Survey	·	430 m	MPC · JPL
856186	2011 SQ_{100}	—	September 24, 2011	Mount Lemmon	Mount Lemmon Survey	·	1.3 km	MPC · JPL
856187	2011 SS_{102}	—	August 29, 2011	Siding Spring	SSS	·	1.8 km	MPC · JPL
856188	2011 ST_{105}	—	September 23, 2011	Mount Lemmon	Mount Lemmon Survey	H	360 m	MPC · JPL
856189	2011 SL_{106}	—	September 24, 2011	Bergisch Gladbach	W. Bickel	·	560 m	MPC · JPL
856190	2011 SF_{110}	—	September 9, 2011	Kitt Peak	Spacewatch	PHO	730 m	MPC · JPL
856191	2011 SD_{113}	—	August 30, 2011	Haleakala	Pan-STARRS 1	PHO	720 m	MPC · JPL
856192	2011 ST_{116}	—	September 21, 2011	Kitt Peak	Spacewatch	·	420 m	MPC · JPL
856193	2011 SM_{118}	—	September 4, 2011	Haleakala	Pan-STARRS 1	·	1.0 km	MPC · JPL
856194	2011 SY_{121}	—	September 21, 2011	Kitt Peak	Spacewatch	·	1.1 km	MPC · JPL
856195	2011 SM_{123}	—	September 23, 2011	Haleakala	Pan-STARRS 1	PHO	560 m	MPC · JPL
856196	2011 SX_{123}	—	September 23, 2011	Kitt Peak	Spacewatch	·	2.1 km	MPC · JPL
856197	2011 SM_{125}	—	September 12, 2007	Mount Lemmon	Mount Lemmon Survey	·	880 m	MPC · JPL
856198	2011 SM_{126}	—	September 23, 2011	Haleakala	Pan-STARRS 1	H	370 m	MPC · JPL
856199	2011 SU_{126}	—	September 20, 2011	Kitt Peak	Spacewatch	TIN	820 m	MPC · JPL
856200	2011 SX_{127}	—	September 20, 2011	Kitt Peak	Spacewatch	H	420 m	MPC · JPL

== 856201–856300 ==
back to top

Designation			Discovery			Properties		Ref
Permanent	Provisional	Named after	Date	Site	Discoverer(s)	Category	Diam.	Ref
856201	2011 SP_{129}	—	September 23, 2011	Haleakala	Pan-STARRS 1	·	790 m	MPC · JPL
856202	2011 SX_{129}	—	September 23, 2011	Haleakala	Pan-STARRS 1	·	890 m	MPC · JPL
856203	2011 SB_{132}	—	September 6, 2011	La Sagra	OAM	·	1.1 km	MPC · JPL
856204	2011 SZ_{132}	—	September 23, 2011	Haleakala	Pan-STARRS 1	·	2.2 km	MPC · JPL
856205	2011 SW_{133}	—	September 24, 2011	Kitt Peak	Spacewatch	·	730 m	MPC · JPL
856206	2011 SU_{136}	—	September 23, 2011	Kitt Peak	Spacewatch	·	1.6 km	MPC · JPL
856207	2011 SQ_{139}	—	December 21, 2008	Kitt Peak	Spacewatch	·	420 m	MPC · JPL
856208	2011 SJ_{141}	—	September 23, 2011	Haleakala	Pan-STARRS 1	·	1.6 km	MPC · JPL
856209	2011 SD_{143}	—	September 23, 2011	Haleakala	Pan-STARRS 1	AGN	820 m	MPC · JPL
856210	2011 SF_{145}	—	September 26, 2011	Mount Lemmon	Mount Lemmon Survey	·	1.5 km	MPC · JPL
856211	2011 SG_{145}	—	September 26, 2011	Mount Lemmon	Mount Lemmon Survey	·	1.2 km	MPC · JPL
856212	2011 SY_{149}	—	September 26, 2011	Haleakala	Pan-STARRS 1	MRX	740 m	MPC · JPL
856213	2011 SU_{150}	—	September 26, 2011	Haleakala	Pan-STARRS 1	·	1.4 km	MPC · JPL
856214	2011 SA_{151}	—	September 8, 2011	Kitt Peak	Spacewatch	·	580 m	MPC · JPL
856215	2011 SB_{151}	—	March 11, 2005	Kitt Peak	Deep Ecliptic Survey	·	1.2 km	MPC · JPL
856216	2011 SF_{151}	—	September 26, 2011	Haleakala	Pan-STARRS 1	·	1.1 km	MPC · JPL
856217	2011 SO_{151}	—	September 7, 2011	Kitt Peak	Spacewatch	V	390 m	MPC · JPL
856218	2011 SQ_{151}	—	October 7, 2004	Kitt Peak	Spacewatch	·	720 m	MPC · JPL
856219	2011 SK_{153}	—	September 8, 2011	Kitt Peak	Spacewatch	(2076)	620 m	MPC · JPL
856220	2011 SQ_{153}	—	September 14, 2007	Mount Lemmon	Mount Lemmon Survey	·	680 m	MPC · JPL
856221	2011 SG_{155}	—	September 26, 2011	Haleakala	Pan-STARRS 1	HOF	1.7 km	MPC · JPL
856222	2011 SX_{156}	—	September 26, 2011	Haleakala	Pan-STARRS 1	·	610 m	MPC · JPL
856223	2011 SN_{157}	—	September 26, 2011	Haleakala	Pan-STARRS 1	·	930 m	MPC · JPL
856224	2011 SQ_{164}	—	September 18, 2003	Kitt Peak	Spacewatch	3:2 · SHU	3.7 km	MPC · JPL
856225	2011 SY_{164}	—	September 23, 2011	Haleakala	Pan-STARRS 1	·	640 m	MPC · JPL
856226	2011 SJ_{166}	—	April 20, 2010	Kitt Peak	Spacewatch	·	1.5 km	MPC · JPL
856227	2011 SL_{166}	—	September 26, 2011	Kitt Peak	Spacewatch	(1547)	1.1 km	MPC · JPL
856228	2011 SE_{170}	—	August 25, 2004	Kitt Peak	Spacewatch	·	550 m	MPC · JPL
856229	2011 SG_{170}	—	September 21, 2011	Kitt Peak	Spacewatch	·	550 m	MPC · JPL
856230	2011 SP_{170}	—	September 28, 2011	Mount Lemmon	Mount Lemmon Survey	·	780 m	MPC · JPL
856231	2011 SX_{170}	—	September 28, 2011	Mount Lemmon	Mount Lemmon Survey	615	1.1 km	MPC · JPL
856232	2011 SH_{173}	—	September 25, 2011	Haleakala	Pan-STARRS 1	·	600 m	MPC · JPL
856233	2011 SB_{175}	—	August 27, 2011	Zelenchukskaya	T. V. Krjačko, B. Satovski	·	1.2 km	MPC · JPL
856234	2011 SG_{175}	—	September 8, 2011	Kitt Peak	Spacewatch	·	2.4 km	MPC · JPL
856235	2011 SN_{175}	—	September 26, 2011	Haleakala	Pan-STARRS 1	·	630 m	MPC · JPL
856236	2011 SU_{175}	—	September 26, 2011	Haleakala	Pan-STARRS 1	·	1.5 km	MPC · JPL
856237	2011 SH_{177}	—	February 12, 2008	Mount Lemmon	Mount Lemmon Survey	·	1.1 km	MPC · JPL
856238	2011 SL_{177}	—	January 18, 2009	Kitt Peak	Spacewatch	·	920 m	MPC · JPL
856239	2011 SC_{178}	—	September 23, 2011	Kitt Peak	Spacewatch	PHO	670 m	MPC · JPL
856240	2011 SF_{178}	—	September 11, 2002	Palomar	NEAT	·	1.5 km	MPC · JPL
856241	2011 SD_{182}	—	September 26, 2011	Kitt Peak	Spacewatch	·	1.0 km	MPC · JPL
856242	2011 SJ_{186}	—	September 28, 2011	Mount Lemmon	Mount Lemmon Survey	EUN	980 m	MPC · JPL
856243	2011 SB_{187}	—	September 29, 2011	Mount Lemmon	Mount Lemmon Survey	·	540 m	MPC · JPL
856244	2011 SS_{187}	—	November 19, 2007	Mount Lemmon	Mount Lemmon Survey	·	980 m	MPC · JPL
856245	2011 SL_{192}	—	June 21, 2007	Mount Lemmon	Mount Lemmon Survey	·	920 m	MPC · JPL
856246	2011 SO_{193}	—	September 8, 2011	Kitt Peak	Spacewatch	·	1.9 km	MPC · JPL
856247	2011 SE_{195}	—	September 18, 2011	Mayhill-ISON	L. Elenin	·	860 m	MPC · JPL
856248	2011 SG_{195}	—	September 18, 2011	Mount Lemmon	Mount Lemmon Survey	HOF	1.7 km	MPC · JPL
856249	2011 SE_{196}	—	August 20, 2011	Haleakala	Pan-STARRS 1	·	650 m	MPC · JPL
856250	2011 SX_{196}	—	September 2, 2011	Haleakala	Pan-STARRS 1	·	930 m	MPC · JPL
856251	2011 SL_{199}	—	September 2, 2011	Haleakala	Pan-STARRS 1	H	340 m	MPC · JPL
856252	2011 SR_{199}	—	December 30, 2008	Mount Lemmon	Mount Lemmon Survey	·	540 m	MPC · JPL
856253	2011 ST_{200}	—	September 18, 2011	Mount Lemmon	Mount Lemmon Survey	DOR	1.4 km	MPC · JPL
856254	2011 SY_{200}	—	August 27, 2011	Haleakala	Pan-STARRS 1	MAS	580 m	MPC · JPL
856255	2011 SG_{201}	—	September 18, 2011	Mount Lemmon	Mount Lemmon Survey	NYS	850 m	MPC · JPL
856256	2011 SH_{204}	—	September 20, 2011	Kitt Peak	Spacewatch	·	1.1 km	MPC · JPL
856257	2011 SQ_{205}	—	September 20, 2011	Kitt Peak	Spacewatch	·	1.4 km	MPC · JPL
856258	2011 SL_{206}	—	July 5, 2011	Haleakala	Pan-STARRS 1	·	840 m	MPC · JPL
856259	2011 SJ_{207}	—	September 20, 2011	Haleakala	Pan-STARRS 1	·	1.7 km	MPC · JPL
856260	2011 SK_{207}	—	September 20, 2011	Kitt Peak	Spacewatch	·	520 m	MPC · JPL
856261	2011 SE_{209}	—	June 11, 2011	Mount Lemmon	Mount Lemmon Survey	·	990 m	MPC · JPL
856262	2011 SH_{210}	—	September 20, 2011	Haleakala	Pan-STARRS 1	·	3.0 km	MPC · JPL
856263	2011 ST_{210}	—	September 21, 2011	Mount Lemmon	Mount Lemmon Survey	·	1.4 km	MPC · JPL
856264	2011 SW_{210}	—	September 21, 2011	Mount Lemmon	Mount Lemmon Survey	·	2.2 km	MPC · JPL
856265	2011 SM_{212}	—	November 4, 2007	Kitt Peak	Spacewatch	(5)	960 m	MPC · JPL
856266	2011 SX_{213}	—	September 21, 2011	Haleakala	Pan-STARRS 1	·	1.9 km	MPC · JPL
856267	2011 SK_{214}	—	September 21, 2011	Kitt Peak	Spacewatch	·	1.7 km	MPC · JPL
856268	2011 SW_{214}	—	August 27, 2011	Haleakala	Pan-STARRS 1	NYS	740 m	MPC · JPL
856269	2011 SJ_{216}	—	September 2, 2011	Haleakala	Pan-STARRS 1	·	420 m	MPC · JPL
856270	2011 SF_{217}	—	September 24, 2011	Mount Lemmon	Mount Lemmon Survey	·	510 m	MPC · JPL
856271	2011 SM_{217}	—	September 18, 2011	Mount Lemmon	Mount Lemmon Survey	(12739)	1.3 km	MPC · JPL
856272	2011 SD_{220}	—	September 26, 2011	Kitt Peak	Spacewatch	JUN	700 m	MPC · JPL
856273	2011 SJ_{221}	—	August 27, 2006	Kitt Peak	Spacewatch	·	1.3 km	MPC · JPL
856274	2011 SF_{222}	—	August 26, 2011	Piszkéstető	K. Sárneczky	·	1.3 km	MPC · JPL
856275	2011 SY_{222}	—	September 27, 2011	Mayhill-ISON	L. Elenin	·	1.5 km	MPC · JPL
856276	2011 SV_{223}	—	September 18, 2011	Mount Lemmon	Mount Lemmon Survey	·	1.4 km	MPC · JPL
856277	2011 SX_{223}	—	September 4, 2011	Haleakala	Pan-STARRS 1	·	960 m	MPC · JPL
856278	2011 SN_{224}	—	September 28, 2011	Mount Lemmon	Mount Lemmon Survey	·	730 m	MPC · JPL
856279	2011 SP_{224}	—	September 28, 2011	Mount Lemmon	Mount Lemmon Survey	·	1.1 km	MPC · JPL
856280	2011 SO_{225}	—	September 22, 2011	Kitt Peak	Spacewatch	·	1.6 km	MPC · JPL
856281	2011 SQ_{225}	—	September 29, 2011	Mount Lemmon	Mount Lemmon Survey	·	1.1 km	MPC · JPL
856282	2011 SN_{228}	—	October 27, 2005	Kitt Peak	Spacewatch	T_{j} (2.9)	940 m	MPC · JPL
856283	2011 SE_{229}	—	September 30, 2011	Mount Lemmon	Mount Lemmon Survey	JUN	660 m	MPC · JPL
856284	2011 SD_{230}	—	September 8, 2011	Kitt Peak	Spacewatch	·	1.3 km	MPC · JPL
856285	2011 SN_{232}	—	September 18, 2011	Mount Lemmon	Mount Lemmon Survey	MRX	860 m	MPC · JPL
856286	2011 SL_{233}	—	September 27, 2011	Mount Lemmon	Mount Lemmon Survey	·	1.7 km	MPC · JPL
856287	2011 SP_{233}	—	September 27, 2011	Mount Lemmon	Mount Lemmon Survey	·	1.7 km	MPC · JPL
856288	2011 SG_{236}	—	September 30, 2011	Haleakala	Pan-STARRS 1	HOF	1.9 km	MPC · JPL
856289	2011 SK_{236}	—	September 2, 2011	Haleakala	Pan-STARRS 1	·	790 m	MPC · JPL
856290	2011 ST_{239}	—	November 8, 2007	Kitt Peak	Spacewatch	AGN	940 m	MPC · JPL
856291	2011 SZ_{241}	—	September 8, 2011	Kitt Peak	Spacewatch	·	930 m	MPC · JPL
856292	2011 SP_{243}	—	August 31, 2006	Mauna Kea	Veillet, C.	DOR	1.7 km	MPC · JPL
856293	2011 SG_{244}	—	September 4, 2011	Haleakala	Pan-STARRS 1	TIR	1.6 km	MPC · JPL
856294	2011 SG_{245}	—	December 17, 2007	Kitt Peak	Spacewatch	·	1.2 km	MPC · JPL
856295	2011 SY_{247}	—	December 16, 2007	Mount Lemmon	Mount Lemmon Survey	·	860 m	MPC · JPL
856296	2011 SS_{248}	—	September 28, 2011	Mount Lemmon	Mount Lemmon Survey	H	310 m	MPC · JPL
856297	2011 SS_{252}	—	September 26, 2011	Haleakala	Pan-STARRS 1	·	1.5 km	MPC · JPL
856298	2011 SQ_{253}	—	September 26, 2011	Haleakala	Pan-STARRS 1	MRX	730 m	MPC · JPL
856299	2011 SJ_{254}	—	October 16, 2003	Kitt Peak	Spacewatch	T_{j} (2.94)	3.1 km	MPC · JPL
856300	2011 SJ_{255}	—	September 29, 2011	Mount Lemmon	Mount Lemmon Survey	·	1.4 km	MPC · JPL

== 856301–856400 ==
back to top

Designation			Discovery			Properties		Ref
Permanent	Provisional	Named after	Date	Site	Discoverer(s)	Category	Diam.	Ref
856301	2011 SX_{257}	—	September 20, 2011	Haleakala	Pan-STARRS 1	·	2.4 km	MPC · JPL
856302	2011 SD_{260}	—	September 29, 2011	Kitt Peak	Spacewatch	·	1.0 km	MPC · JPL
856303	2011 SE_{265}	—	September 20, 2011	Mount Lemmon	Mount Lemmon Survey	·	1.2 km	MPC · JPL
856304	2011 SK_{265}	—	September 20, 2011	Kitt Peak	Spacewatch	·	500 m	MPC · JPL
856305	2011 SE_{268}	—	September 23, 2011	Kitt Peak	Spacewatch	·	1.9 km	MPC · JPL
856306	2011 SX_{268}	—	September 20, 2011	Kitt Peak	Spacewatch	NYS	860 m	MPC · JPL
856307	2011 SA_{269}	—	September 23, 2011	Haleakala	Pan-STARRS 1	PHO	790 m	MPC · JPL
856308	2011 SE_{269}	—	September 23, 2011	Haleakala	Pan-STARRS 1	EUN	850 m	MPC · JPL
856309	2011 SJ_{270}	—	September 26, 2011	Haleakala	Pan-STARRS 1	·	490 m	MPC · JPL
856310	2011 SL_{272}	—	September 20, 2011	Catalina	CSS	·	2.7 km	MPC · JPL
856311	2011 SW_{277}	—	October 20, 2003	Kitt Peak	Spacewatch	H	300 m	MPC · JPL
856312	2011 SZ_{278}	—	September 17, 2006	Kitt Peak	Spacewatch	·	1.5 km	MPC · JPL
856313	2011 SZ_{279}	—	September 24, 2011	Haleakala	Pan-STARRS 1	V	380 m	MPC · JPL
856314	2011 SJ_{280}	—	September 27, 2011	Mount Lemmon	Mount Lemmon Survey	·	1.5 km	MPC · JPL
856315	2011 SE_{281}	—	September 24, 2011	Haleakala	Pan-STARRS 1	·	1.6 km	MPC · JPL
856316	2011 ST_{281}	—	September 11, 2007	Mount Lemmon	Mount Lemmon Survey	NYS	920 m	MPC · JPL
856317	2011 SZ_{282}	—	September 24, 2011	Mount Lemmon	Mount Lemmon Survey	·	630 m	MPC · JPL
856318	2011 SL_{283}	—	September 21, 2011	Haleakala	Pan-STARRS 1	·	2.2 km	MPC · JPL
856319	2011 SZ_{283}	—	September 8, 2016	Haleakala	Pan-STARRS 1	·	1.4 km	MPC · JPL
856320	2011 SD_{285}	—	September 21, 2011	Kitt Peak	Spacewatch	H	380 m	MPC · JPL
856321	2011 SF_{286}	—	September 21, 2011	Mount Lemmon	Mount Lemmon Survey	·	1.3 km	MPC · JPL
856322	2011 SK_{286}	—	June 27, 2014	Haleakala	Pan-STARRS 1	·	650 m	MPC · JPL
856323	2011 SN_{286}	—	September 23, 2011	Mount Lemmon	Mount Lemmon Survey	MRX	840 m	MPC · JPL
856324	2011 SC_{287}	—	September 24, 2011	Haleakala	Pan-STARRS 1	·	660 m	MPC · JPL
856325	2011 SS_{288}	—	September 21, 2011	Mount Lemmon	Mount Lemmon Survey	·	1.5 km	MPC · JPL
856326	2011 SW_{288}	—	September 30, 2011	Mount Lemmon	Mount Lemmon Survey	·	1.9 km	MPC · JPL
856327	2011 SX_{289}	—	September 19, 2011	Haleakala	Pan-STARRS 1	·	1.3 km	MPC · JPL
856328	2011 SL_{290}	—	September 28, 2011	Mount Lemmon	Mount Lemmon Survey	·	1.1 km	MPC · JPL
856329	2011 ST_{290}	—	September 23, 2011	Kitt Peak	Spacewatch	·	820 m	MPC · JPL
856330	2011 SV_{290}	—	September 27, 2011	Mount Lemmon	Mount Lemmon Survey	·	1.8 km	MPC · JPL
856331	2011 SU_{291}	—	September 24, 2011	Haleakala	Pan-STARRS 1	·	1.9 km	MPC · JPL
856332	2011 SZ_{291}	—	September 19, 2011	Haleakala	Pan-STARRS 1	·	1.2 km	MPC · JPL
856333	2011 SC_{292}	—	September 29, 2011	Mount Lemmon	Mount Lemmon Survey	·	2.2 km	MPC · JPL
856334	2011 SU_{292}	—	September 20, 2011	Kitt Peak	Spacewatch	·	460 m	MPC · JPL
856335	2011 SO_{293}	—	September 24, 2011	Haleakala	Pan-STARRS 1	·	1.1 km	MPC · JPL
856336	2011 SP_{293}	—	September 19, 2011	Haleakala	Pan-STARRS 1	·	1.2 km	MPC · JPL
856337	2011 SQ_{293}	—	September 30, 2011	Kitt Peak	Spacewatch	·	1.3 km	MPC · JPL
856338	2011 SJ_{294}	—	September 27, 2011	Mount Lemmon	Mount Lemmon Survey	·	1.3 km	MPC · JPL
856339	2011 SY_{295}	—	September 20, 2011	Mount Lemmon	Mount Lemmon Survey	3:2	3.3 km	MPC · JPL
856340	2011 SS_{296}	—	September 25, 2015	Mount Lemmon	Mount Lemmon Survey	·	900 m	MPC · JPL
856341	2011 SU_{297}	—	March 25, 2014	Mount Lemmon	Mount Lemmon Survey	·	1.1 km	MPC · JPL
856342	2011 SW_{297}	—	September 26, 2011	Haleakala	Pan-STARRS 1	THM	1.5 km	MPC · JPL
856343	2011 SN_{298}	—	April 3, 2017	Haleakala	Pan-STARRS 1	·	740 m	MPC · JPL
856344	2011 SY_{298}	—	July 24, 2015	Haleakala	Pan-STARRS 1	·	780 m	MPC · JPL
856345	2011 SL_{299}	—	September 27, 2011	Mount Lemmon	Mount Lemmon Survey	PHO	600 m	MPC · JPL
856346	2011 SU_{299}	—	September 21, 2011	Kitt Peak	Spacewatch	PHO	720 m	MPC · JPL
856347	2011 SP_{300}	—	September 21, 2011	Kitt Peak	Spacewatch	·	660 m	MPC · JPL
856348	2011 SE_{301}	—	September 29, 2011	Mount Lemmon	Mount Lemmon Survey	·	820 m	MPC · JPL
856349	2011 SQ_{301}	—	September 26, 2011	Haleakala	Pan-STARRS 1	·	630 m	MPC · JPL
856350	2011 SE_{302}	—	August 21, 2015	Haleakala	Pan-STARRS 1	EUN	810 m	MPC · JPL
856351	2011 SL_{302}	—	August 14, 2015	Haleakala	Pan-STARRS 1	·	780 m	MPC · JPL
856352	2011 SE_{303}	—	September 23, 2015	Mount Lemmon	Mount Lemmon Survey	·	740 m	MPC · JPL
856353	2011 SL_{303}	—	September 18, 2011	Mount Lemmon	Mount Lemmon Survey	·	1.2 km	MPC · JPL
856354	2011 SM_{303}	—	July 24, 2015	Haleakala	Pan-STARRS 1	·	1.3 km	MPC · JPL
856355	2011 SB_{304}	—	February 28, 2014	Haleakala	Pan-STARRS 1	·	1.2 km	MPC · JPL
856356	2011 SE_{305}	—	May 21, 2014	Haleakala	Pan-STARRS 1	·	640 m	MPC · JPL
856357	2011 SO_{305}	—	September 18, 2011	Mount Lemmon	Mount Lemmon Survey	·	680 m	MPC · JPL
856358	2011 SD_{306}	—	October 25, 2016	Haleakala	Pan-STARRS 1	·	1.3 km	MPC · JPL
856359	2011 SE_{307}	—	September 26, 2011	Haleakala	Pan-STARRS 1	MRX	580 m	MPC · JPL
856360	2011 SQ_{307}	—	September 20, 2011	Kitt Peak	Spacewatch	·	600 m	MPC · JPL
856361	2011 SW_{307}	—	September 24, 2011	Mount Lemmon	Mount Lemmon Survey	MAS	560 m	MPC · JPL
856362	2011 SK_{309}	—	September 26, 2011	Kitt Peak	Spacewatch	·	370 m	MPC · JPL
856363	2011 SO_{309}	—	September 22, 2011	Kitt Peak	Spacewatch	·	1.1 km	MPC · JPL
856364	2011 SP_{312}	—	September 29, 2011	Mount Lemmon	Mount Lemmon Survey	·	1.6 km	MPC · JPL
856365	2011 SR_{312}	—	September 19, 2011	Haleakala	Pan-STARRS 1	·	1.2 km	MPC · JPL
856366	2011 SS_{312}	—	September 23, 2011	Kitt Peak	Spacewatch	DOR	1.7 km	MPC · JPL
856367	2011 SY_{312}	—	September 24, 2011	Haleakala	Pan-STARRS 1	·	1.3 km	MPC · JPL
856368	2011 SZ_{312}	—	September 20, 2011	Mount Lemmon	Mount Lemmon Survey	·	1.4 km	MPC · JPL
856369	2011 SF_{313}	—	September 25, 2011	Haleakala	Pan-STARRS 1	·	1.3 km	MPC · JPL
856370	2011 SO_{313}	—	September 21, 2011	Mount Lemmon	Mount Lemmon Survey	·	1.2 km	MPC · JPL
856371	2011 SR_{313}	—	September 25, 2011	Haleakala	Pan-STARRS 1	·	1.4 km	MPC · JPL
856372	2011 SM_{314}	—	September 24, 2011	Haleakala	Pan-STARRS 1	·	560 m	MPC · JPL
856373	2011 SD_{315}	—	September 23, 2011	Haleakala	Pan-STARRS 1	V	370 m	MPC · JPL
856374	2011 SP_{315}	—	September 19, 2011	Haleakala	Pan-STARRS 1	·	1.2 km	MPC · JPL
856375	2011 SX_{315}	—	September 20, 2011	Haleakala	Pan-STARRS 1	·	540 m	MPC · JPL
856376	2011 SH_{317}	—	September 21, 2011	Kitt Peak	Spacewatch	·	1.2 km	MPC · JPL
856377	2011 SL_{317}	—	September 22, 2011	Kitt Peak	Spacewatch	·	1.4 km	MPC · JPL
856378	2011 SN_{317}	—	September 25, 2011	Haleakala	Pan-STARRS 1	·	1.5 km	MPC · JPL
856379	2011 SO_{317}	—	September 23, 2011	Haleakala	Pan-STARRS 1	·	1.5 km	MPC · JPL
856380	2011 SG_{319}	—	September 18, 2011	Mount Lemmon	Mount Lemmon Survey	AGN	840 m	MPC · JPL
856381	2011 SJ_{319}	—	September 21, 2011	Mount Lemmon	Mount Lemmon Survey	·	1.2 km	MPC · JPL
856382	2011 SR_{319}	—	September 19, 2011	Mount Lemmon	Mount Lemmon Survey	GEF	810 m	MPC · JPL
856383	2011 SW_{319}	—	September 18, 2011	Mount Lemmon	Mount Lemmon Survey	·	510 m	MPC · JPL
856384	2011 SY_{319}	—	September 21, 2011	Mount Lemmon	Mount Lemmon Survey	·	1.4 km	MPC · JPL
856385	2011 SG_{320}	—	September 18, 2011	Mount Lemmon	Mount Lemmon Survey	AGN	770 m	MPC · JPL
856386	2011 SH_{320}	—	September 21, 2011	Mount Lemmon	Mount Lemmon Survey	·	1.1 km	MPC · JPL
856387	2011 SV_{320}	—	September 28, 2011	Mount Lemmon	Mount Lemmon Survey	·	1.3 km	MPC · JPL
856388	2011 SA_{321}	—	September 26, 2011	Haleakala	Pan-STARRS 1	·	1.6 km	MPC · JPL
856389	2011 SF_{321}	—	September 22, 2011	Kitt Peak	Spacewatch	·	1.2 km	MPC · JPL
856390	2011 SH_{321}	—	October 21, 2007	Mount Lemmon	Mount Lemmon Survey	·	1.1 km	MPC · JPL
856391	2011 SN_{321}	—	September 28, 2011	Mount Lemmon	Mount Lemmon Survey	·	1.2 km	MPC · JPL
856392	2011 SB_{322}	—	September 30, 2011	Kitt Peak	Spacewatch	DOR	1.8 km	MPC · JPL
856393	2011 SJ_{322}	—	September 20, 2011	Mount Lemmon	Mount Lemmon Survey	·	1.4 km	MPC · JPL
856394	2011 SK_{323}	—	September 25, 2011	Haleakala	Pan-STARRS 1	·	1.3 km	MPC · JPL
856395	2011 SP_{323}	—	September 24, 2011	Mount Lemmon	Mount Lemmon Survey	AGN	750 m	MPC · JPL
856396	2011 SF_{324}	—	September 28, 2011	Mount Lemmon	Mount Lemmon Survey	·	1.1 km	MPC · JPL
856397	2011 SQ_{324}	—	September 23, 2011	Haleakala	Pan-STARRS 1	·	1.2 km	MPC · JPL
856398	2011 SD_{326}	—	September 26, 2011	Haleakala	Pan-STARRS 1	·	1.2 km	MPC · JPL
856399	2011 SB_{327}	—	September 26, 2011	Mount Lemmon	Mount Lemmon Survey	·	1.0 km	MPC · JPL
856400	2011 SF_{327}	—	September 28, 2011	Kitt Peak	Spacewatch	·	1.4 km	MPC · JPL

== 856401–856500 ==
back to top

Designation			Discovery			Properties		Ref
Permanent	Provisional	Named after	Date	Site	Discoverer(s)	Category	Diam.	Ref
856401	2011 SL_{328}	—	September 23, 2011	Haleakala	Pan-STARRS 1	H	320 m	MPC · JPL
856402	2011 SB_{329}	—	September 21, 2011	Mount Lemmon	Mount Lemmon Survey	·	490 m	MPC · JPL
856403	2011 SC_{329}	—	September 20, 2011	Haleakala	Pan-STARRS 1	H	350 m	MPC · JPL
856404	2011 SE_{329}	—	September 23, 2011	Kitt Peak	Spacewatch	·	570 m	MPC · JPL
856405	2011 SO_{330}	—	September 20, 2011	Haleakala	Pan-STARRS 1	·	680 m	MPC · JPL
856406	2011 SR_{330}	—	September 29, 2011	Mount Lemmon	Mount Lemmon Survey	·	1.7 km	MPC · JPL
856407	2011 SV_{330}	—	September 30, 2011	Haleakala	Pan-STARRS 1	L5	5.7 km	MPC · JPL
856408	2011 SE_{331}	—	September 21, 2011	Haleakala	Pan-STARRS 1	·	420 m	MPC · JPL
856409	2011 SF_{331}	—	September 20, 2011	Mount Lemmon	Mount Lemmon Survey	·	2.0 km	MPC · JPL
856410	2011 SQ_{332}	—	September 18, 2011	Mount Lemmon	Mount Lemmon Survey	·	890 m	MPC · JPL
856411	2011 SP_{333}	—	September 26, 2011	Mount Lemmon	Mount Lemmon Survey	·	590 m	MPC · JPL
856412	2011 SQ_{333}	—	September 23, 2011	Kitt Peak	Spacewatch	·	530 m	MPC · JPL
856413	2011 SO_{337}	—	September 29, 2011	Mount Lemmon	Mount Lemmon Survey	EOS	1.3 km	MPC · JPL
856414	2011 SQ_{337}	—	September 28, 2011	ESA OGS	ESA OGS	·	1.1 km	MPC · JPL
856415	2011 SO_{339}	—	September 25, 2011	Haleakala	Pan-STARRS 1	·	590 m	MPC · JPL
856416	2011 SO_{340}	—	September 22, 2011	Kitt Peak	Spacewatch	·	1.3 km	MPC · JPL
856417	2011 SH_{342}	—	September 24, 2011	Haleakala	Pan-STARRS 1	·	740 m	MPC · JPL
856418	2011 SX_{342}	—	September 19, 2011	Haleakala	Pan-STARRS 1	V	390 m	MPC · JPL
856419	2011 SB_{343}	—	September 20, 2011	Mount Lemmon	Mount Lemmon Survey	·	520 m	MPC · JPL
856420	2011 SX_{343}	—	September 19, 2011	Haleakala	Pan-STARRS 1	·	500 m	MPC · JPL
856421	2011 SP_{344}	—	September 29, 2011	Mount Lemmon	Mount Lemmon Survey	·	1.0 km	MPC · JPL
856422	2011 SF_{345}	—	September 28, 2011	Mount Lemmon	Mount Lemmon Survey	·	870 m	MPC · JPL
856423	2011 SN_{345}	—	September 26, 2011	Haleakala	Pan-STARRS 1	KOR	920 m	MPC · JPL
856424	2011 SO_{345}	—	September 25, 2011	Haleakala	Pan-STARRS 1	·	1.3 km	MPC · JPL
856425	2011 SG_{346}	—	September 18, 2011	Mount Lemmon	Mount Lemmon Survey	·	580 m	MPC · JPL
856426	2011 SJ_{346}	—	September 24, 2011	Haleakala	Pan-STARRS 1	·	2.0 km	MPC · JPL
856427	2011 SP_{346}	—	September 24, 2011	Haleakala	Pan-STARRS 1	·	1.5 km	MPC · JPL
856428	2011 SY_{349}	—	September 28, 2011	Kitt Peak	Spacewatch	·	2.1 km	MPC · JPL
856429	2011 ST_{352}	—	August 28, 2005	Kitt Peak	Spacewatch	THM	1.7 km	MPC · JPL
856430	2011 SR_{354}	—	September 24, 2011	Haleakala	Pan-STARRS 1	·	1.9 km	MPC · JPL
856431	2011 SM_{356}	—	September 27, 2011	Mount Lemmon	Mount Lemmon Survey	·	1.5 km	MPC · JPL
856432	2011 ST_{356}	—	September 20, 2011	Mount Lemmon	Mount Lemmon Survey	·	670 m	MPC · JPL
856433	2011 SW_{357}	—	September 20, 2011	Mount Lemmon	Mount Lemmon Survey	V	450 m	MPC · JPL
856434	2011 SF_{358}	—	September 21, 2011	Mount Lemmon	Mount Lemmon Survey	·	700 m	MPC · JPL
856435	2011 ST_{359}	—	September 23, 2011	Kitt Peak	Spacewatch	·	2.6 km	MPC · JPL
856436	2011 SO_{364}	—	September 28, 2011	Kitt Peak	Spacewatch	·	930 m	MPC · JPL
856437	2011 SJ_{365}	—	September 26, 2011	Haleakala	Pan-STARRS 1	·	1.3 km	MPC · JPL
856438	2011 SO_{365}	—	September 24, 2011	Haleakala	Pan-STARRS 1	·	750 m	MPC · JPL
856439	2011 TK_{4}	—	September 25, 2011	Haleakala	Pan-STARRS 1	·	1.4 km	MPC · JPL
856440	2011 TA_{6}	—	September 14, 2002	Anderson Mesa	LONEOS	·	1.2 km	MPC · JPL
856441	2011 TH_{6}	—	September 24, 2011	Haleakala	Pan-STARRS 1	·	1.1 km	MPC · JPL
856442	2011 TB_{9}	—	September 28, 2011	Kitt Peak	Spacewatch	MAS	530 m	MPC · JPL
856443	2011 TR_{9}	—	October 12, 2011	Haleakala	Pan-STARRS 1	·	2.2 km	MPC · JPL
856444	2011 TU_{10}	—	September 26, 2011	Haleakala	Pan-STARRS 1	PHO	710 m	MPC · JPL
856445	2011 TS_{12}	—	September 23, 2011	Haleakala	Pan-STARRS 1	AGN	900 m	MPC · JPL
856446	2011 TX_{13}	—	September 8, 2007	Mount Lemmon	Mount Lemmon Survey	·	850 m	MPC · JPL
856447	2011 TY_{16}	—	October 5, 2011	Piszkéstető	K. Sárneczky	·	1.0 km	MPC · JPL
856448	2011 TF_{17}	—	September 24, 2011	Catalina	CSS	·	1.3 km	MPC · JPL
856449	2011 TM_{18}	—	August 3, 2016	Haleakala	Pan-STARRS 1	·	1.6 km	MPC · JPL
856450	2011 TA_{19}	—	October 4, 2011	Piszkés-tető	K. Sárneczky, S. Kürti	(18466)	2.0 km	MPC · JPL
856451	2011 TD_{19}	—	October 4, 2011	Piszkés-tető	K. Sárneczky, S. Kürti	EOS	1.5 km	MPC · JPL
856452	2011 TM_{20}	—	October 1, 2011	Mount Lemmon	Mount Lemmon Survey	·	690 m	MPC · JPL
856453	2011 TP_{20}	—	October 5, 2011	Haleakala	Pan-STARRS 1	H	320 m	MPC · JPL
856454	2011 TV_{20}	—	October 4, 2011	Piszkés-tető	K. Sárneczky, S. Kürti	·	1.2 km	MPC · JPL
856455	2011 TW_{20}	—	August 28, 2006	Kitt Peak	Spacewatch	·	1.5 km	MPC · JPL
856456	2011 TO_{21}	—	October 3, 2011	Mount Lemmon	Mount Lemmon Survey	GEF	870 m	MPC · JPL
856457	2011 TA_{22}	—	October 3, 2011	Mount Lemmon	Mount Lemmon Survey	MAR	580 m	MPC · JPL
856458	2011 TN_{23}	—	October 2, 2011	Bergisch Gladbach	W. Bickel	AGN	820 m	MPC · JPL
856459	2011 UC	—	August 18, 2002	Palomar Mountain	NEAT	·	810 m	MPC · JPL
856460	2011 UN_{2}	—	October 18, 2011	Catalina	CSS	·	740 m	MPC · JPL
856461	2011 UL_{3}	—	September 30, 2011	Kitt Peak	Spacewatch	·	770 m	MPC · JPL
856462	2011 UR_{7}	—	October 15, 1998	Kitt Peak	Spacewatch	·	840 m	MPC · JPL
856463	2011 UE_{9}	—	October 18, 2011	Mount Lemmon	Mount Lemmon Survey	MAS	560 m	MPC · JPL
856464	2011 UN_{9}	—	October 18, 2011	Mount Lemmon	Mount Lemmon Survey	·	1.1 km	MPC · JPL
856465	2011 UD_{11}	—	September 18, 2011	Mount Lemmon	Mount Lemmon Survey	(13314)	1.6 km	MPC · JPL
856466	2011 UE_{12}	—	September 22, 2011	Catalina	CSS	JUN	770 m	MPC · JPL
856467	2011 UW_{16}	—	October 18, 2011	Mount Lemmon	Mount Lemmon Survey	·	560 m	MPC · JPL
856468	2011 UA_{17}	—	September 27, 2000	Kitt Peak	Spacewatch	·	840 m	MPC · JPL
856469	2011 UC_{20}	—	September 13, 2007	Mount Lemmon	Mount Lemmon Survey	·	840 m	MPC · JPL
856470	2011 UR_{22}	—	October 1, 2011	Kitt Peak	Spacewatch	·	780 m	MPC · JPL
856471	2011 UA_{23}	—	October 20, 2007	Mount Lemmon	Mount Lemmon Survey	EUN	780 m	MPC · JPL
856472	2011 UQ_{23}	—	October 1, 2011	Kitt Peak	Spacewatch	·	750 m	MPC · JPL
856473	2011 UL_{30}	—	October 18, 2011	Mount Lemmon	Mount Lemmon Survey	·	1.5 km	MPC · JPL
856474	2011 UT_{33}	—	October 16, 2011	Catalina	CSS	·	530 m	MPC · JPL
856475	2011 UV_{35}	—	October 5, 2011	Les Engarouines	L. Bernasconi	·	1.6 km	MPC · JPL
856476	2011 UC_{36}	—	October 19, 2011	Mount Lemmon	Mount Lemmon Survey	·	1.6 km	MPC · JPL
856477	2011 UQ_{39}	—	October 5, 2011	Piszkéstető	K. Sárneczky	·	1.9 km	MPC · JPL
856478	2011 UW_{39}	—	July 11, 1997	Kitt Peak	Spacewatch	AEO	920 m	MPC · JPL
856479	2011 UJ_{40}	—	September 23, 2011	Haleakala	Pan-STARRS 1	·	1.0 km	MPC · JPL
856480	2011 UD_{41}	—	September 22, 2011	Kitt Peak	Spacewatch	·	1.4 km	MPC · JPL
856481	2011 UZ_{43}	—	September 22, 2011	Kitt Peak	Spacewatch	·	650 m	MPC · JPL
856482	2011 UH_{51}	—	October 18, 2011	Kitt Peak	Spacewatch	·	2.1 km	MPC · JPL
856483	2011 UJ_{51}	—	January 11, 2008	Kitt Peak	Spacewatch	·	850 m	MPC · JPL
856484	2011 UX_{51}	—	October 18, 2011	Kitt Peak	Spacewatch	·	650 m	MPC · JPL
856485	2011 UP_{52}	—	August 24, 2007	Kitt Peak	Spacewatch	·	900 m	MPC · JPL
856486	2011 UL_{57}	—	September 28, 2011	Kitt Peak	Spacewatch	·	890 m	MPC · JPL
856487	2011 UX_{64}	—	October 19, 2011	Kitt Peak	Spacewatch	·	1.3 km	MPC · JPL
856488	2011 UB_{67}	—	October 20, 2011	Mount Lemmon	Mount Lemmon Survey	·	580 m	MPC · JPL
856489	2011 UV_{68}	—	September 29, 2011	Mount Lemmon	Mount Lemmon Survey	·	960 m	MPC · JPL
856490	2011 UU_{69}	—	October 21, 2011	Mount Lemmon	Mount Lemmon Survey	EOS	1.3 km	MPC · JPL
856491	2011 US_{72}	—	October 18, 2011	Mount Lemmon	Mount Lemmon Survey	·	2.5 km	MPC · JPL
856492	2011 UT_{73}	—	October 18, 2011	Mount Lemmon	Mount Lemmon Survey	MIS	1.7 km	MPC · JPL
856493	2011 UN_{78}	—	August 24, 2007	Kitt Peak	Spacewatch	·	790 m	MPC · JPL
856494	2011 UF_{79}	—	September 22, 2011	Mount Lemmon	Mount Lemmon Survey	ADE	1.1 km	MPC · JPL
856495	2011 UD_{81}	—	October 19, 2011	Kitt Peak	Spacewatch	·	580 m	MPC · JPL
856496	2011 UG_{82}	—	October 19, 2011	Kitt Peak	Spacewatch	·	810 m	MPC · JPL
856497	2011 UP_{83}	—	October 19, 2011	Kitt Peak	Spacewatch	·	460 m	MPC · JPL
856498	2011 UL_{84}	—	October 19, 2011	Kitt Peak	Spacewatch	·	1.2 km	MPC · JPL
856499	2011 UA_{88}	—	October 21, 2011	Mount Lemmon	Mount Lemmon Survey	·	700 m	MPC · JPL
856500	2011 US_{88}	—	October 21, 2011	Mount Lemmon	Mount Lemmon Survey	EUN	910 m	MPC · JPL

== 856501–856600 ==
back to top

Designation			Discovery			Properties		Ref
Permanent	Provisional	Named after	Date	Site	Discoverer(s)	Category	Diam.	Ref
856501	2011 UG_{91}	—	October 23, 2011	Catalina	CSS	·	1.2 km	MPC · JPL
856502	2011 UH_{96}	—	October 19, 2011	Mount Lemmon	Mount Lemmon Survey	·	1.1 km	MPC · JPL
856503	2011 UP_{96}	—	October 19, 2011	Mount Lemmon	Mount Lemmon Survey	·	710 m	MPC · JPL
856504	2011 UJ_{99}	—	September 23, 2011	Mount Lemmon	Mount Lemmon Survey	·	1.2 km	MPC · JPL
856505	2011 UT_{100}	—	October 20, 2011	Mount Lemmon	Mount Lemmon Survey	·	1.4 km	MPC · JPL
856506	2011 UH_{102}	—	September 29, 2011	Mount Lemmon	Mount Lemmon Survey	·	610 m	MPC · JPL
856507	2011 UK_{102}	—	October 20, 2011	Mount Lemmon	Mount Lemmon Survey	·	370 m	MPC · JPL
856508	2011 UF_{104}	—	August 23, 2004	Kitt Peak	Spacewatch	·	500 m	MPC · JPL
856509	2011 UX_{105}	—	October 19, 2006	Kitt Peak	Spacewatch	·	1.3 km	MPC · JPL
856510	2011 UG_{115}	—	September 9, 2011	Kitt Peak	Spacewatch	·	800 m	MPC · JPL
856511	2011 UP_{115}	—	September 23, 2011	Kitt Peak	Spacewatch	·	970 m	MPC · JPL
856512	2011 UR_{117}	—	October 17, 2011	Piszkés-tető	K. Sárneczky, A. Szing	·	2.3 km	MPC · JPL
856513	2011 UX_{117}	—	September 26, 2011	Kitt Peak	Spacewatch	·	1.2 km	MPC · JPL
856514	2011 UE_{120}	—	October 18, 2011	Mount Lemmon	Mount Lemmon Survey	·	810 m	MPC · JPL
856515	2011 UK_{120}	—	October 18, 2011	Haleakala	Pan-STARRS 1	·	1.4 km	MPC · JPL
856516	2011 UV_{121}	—	September 25, 2011	Haleakala	Pan-STARRS 1	H	400 m	MPC · JPL
856517	2011 UP_{123}	—	October 19, 2011	Mount Lemmon	Mount Lemmon Survey	LIX	2.4 km	MPC · JPL
856518	2011 UP_{124}	—	September 22, 2011	Kitt Peak	Spacewatch	·	1.6 km	MPC · JPL
856519	2011 UD_{127}	—	October 20, 2011	Mount Lemmon	Mount Lemmon Survey	·	370 m	MPC · JPL
856520	2011 UN_{129}	—	September 30, 2011	Kitt Peak	Spacewatch	·	1.1 km	MPC · JPL
856521	2011 UM_{130}	—	July 16, 2010	WISE	WISE	·	2.5 km	MPC · JPL
856522	2011 UT_{131}	—	September 24, 2011	Haleakala	Pan-STARRS 1	·	2.1 km	MPC · JPL
856523	2011 UG_{143}	—	October 23, 2011	Haleakala	Pan-STARRS 1	·	2.1 km	MPC · JPL
856524	2011 UY_{143}	—	August 21, 2006	Kitt Peak	Spacewatch	·	1.2 km	MPC · JPL
856525	2011 UO_{145}	—	October 24, 2011	Kitt Peak	Spacewatch	·	1.2 km	MPC · JPL
856526	2011 US_{149}	—	September 23, 2011	Haleakala	Pan-STARRS 1	·	540 m	MPC · JPL
856527	2011 US_{153}	—	October 23, 2011	Haleakala	Pan-STARRS 1	·	1.9 km	MPC · JPL
856528	2011 UK_{162}	—	October 24, 2011	Calvin-Rehoboth	L. A. Molnar	·	1.3 km	MPC · JPL
856529	2011 UC_{167}	—	September 19, 2011	Haleakala	Pan-STARRS 1	·	2.3 km	MPC · JPL
856530	2011 UN_{168}	—	September 2, 2011	Haleakala	Pan-STARRS 1	GEF	760 m	MPC · JPL
856531	2011 UA_{169}	—	October 26, 2011	Haleakala	Pan-STARRS 1	H	380 m	MPC · JPL
856532	2011 UD_{172}	—	October 21, 2011	Haleakala	Pan-STARRS 1	(18466)	1.6 km	MPC · JPL
856533	2011 UG_{174}	—	October 23, 2011	Haleakala	Pan-STARRS 1	EUN	840 m	MPC · JPL
856534	2011 UP_{174}	—	October 23, 2011	Haleakala	Pan-STARRS 1	·	890 m	MPC · JPL
856535	2011 UJ_{175}	—	October 24, 2011	Kitt Peak	Spacewatch	·	1.5 km	MPC · JPL
856536	2011 UD_{176}	—	October 4, 2004	Kitt Peak	Spacewatch	·	480 m	MPC · JPL
856537	2011 UU_{179}	—	October 1, 2011	Mount Lemmon	Mount Lemmon Survey	·	980 m	MPC · JPL
856538	2011 US_{180}	—	October 24, 2011	Haleakala	Pan-STARRS 1	·	720 m	MPC · JPL
856539	2011 UA_{181}	—	October 24, 2011	Haleakala	Pan-STARRS 1	·	2.2 km	MPC · JPL
856540	2011 UR_{181}	—	October 20, 2011	Kitt Peak	Spacewatch	AEO	800 m	MPC · JPL
856541	2011 UK_{185}	—	October 25, 2011	Haleakala	Pan-STARRS 1	JUN	730 m	MPC · JPL
856542	2011 UD_{186}	—	October 25, 2011	Haleakala	Pan-STARRS 1	·	470 m	MPC · JPL
856543	2011 UA_{192}	—	September 11, 2006	Catalina	CSS	·	1.6 km	MPC · JPL
856544	2011 UG_{192}	—	September 29, 2011	Kitt Peak	Spacewatch	NYS	620 m	MPC · JPL
856545	2011 UR_{195}	—	October 24, 2011	Haleakala	Pan-STARRS 1	·	650 m	MPC · JPL
856546	2011 UB_{198}	—	October 21, 2011	Kitt Peak	Spacewatch	·	860 m	MPC · JPL
856547	2011 UU_{202}	—	October 26, 2011	Haleakala	Pan-STARRS 1	·	1.4 km	MPC · JPL
856548	2011 UD_{204}	—	September 5, 2007	Siding Spring	K. Sárneczky, L. Kiss	·	630 m	MPC · JPL
856549	2011 UY_{204}	—	October 20, 2011	Catalina	CSS	·	1.6 km	MPC · JPL
856550	2011 US_{205}	—	October 20, 2011	Kitt Peak	Spacewatch	·	880 m	MPC · JPL
856551	2011 UF_{210}	—	October 24, 2011	Mount Lemmon	Mount Lemmon Survey	·	1.5 km	MPC · JPL
856552	2011 UH_{210}	—	October 24, 2011	Mount Lemmon	Mount Lemmon Survey	·	600 m	MPC · JPL
856553	2011 UJ_{210}	—	October 24, 2011	Mount Lemmon	Mount Lemmon Survey	·	550 m	MPC · JPL
856554	2011 UG_{212}	—	October 16, 2011	Kitt Peak	Spacewatch	·	1.4 km	MPC · JPL
856555	2011 UJ_{215}	—	October 24, 2011	Mount Lemmon	Mount Lemmon Survey	·	1.9 km	MPC · JPL
856556	2011 UN_{215}	—	October 19, 2011	Mount Lemmon	Mount Lemmon Survey	·	630 m	MPC · JPL
856557	2011 UW_{216}	—	February 10, 2008	Mount Lemmon	Mount Lemmon Survey	·	1.3 km	MPC · JPL
856558	2011 UB_{219}	—	October 24, 2011	Mount Lemmon	Mount Lemmon Survey	KOR	920 m	MPC · JPL
856559	2011 UG_{219}	—	October 24, 2011	Mount Lemmon	Mount Lemmon Survey	·	500 m	MPC · JPL
856560	2011 UP_{219}	—	December 4, 2007	Mount Lemmon	Mount Lemmon Survey	·	930 m	MPC · JPL
856561	2011 UR_{220}	—	October 24, 2011	Mount Lemmon	Mount Lemmon Survey	·	1.3 km	MPC · JPL
856562	2011 UT_{224}	—	October 24, 2011	Mount Lemmon	Mount Lemmon Survey	·	1.1 km	MPC · JPL
856563	2011 UE_{226}	—	October 24, 2011	Mount Lemmon	Mount Lemmon Survey	·	1.2 km	MPC · JPL
856564	2011 UF_{228}	—	May 2, 2014	Mount Lemmon	Mount Lemmon Survey	·	1.3 km	MPC · JPL
856565	2011 UK_{229}	—	October 24, 2011	Mount Lemmon	Mount Lemmon Survey	·	1.3 km	MPC · JPL
856566	2011 UK_{233}	—	October 18, 2011	Mount Lemmon	Mount Lemmon Survey	KOR	960 m	MPC · JPL
856567	2011 UW_{236}	—	October 22, 2011	Kitt Peak	Spacewatch	EUN	820 m	MPC · JPL
856568	2011 UF_{237}	—	October 24, 2011	Haleakala	Pan-STARRS 1	·	1.6 km	MPC · JPL
856569	2011 UV_{240}	—	March 20, 2010	Kitt Peak	Spacewatch	·	730 m	MPC · JPL
856570	2011 UX_{242}	—	October 22, 2011	Kitt Peak	Spacewatch	·	530 m	MPC · JPL
856571	2011 UR_{243}	—	August 20, 2000	Kitt Peak	Spacewatch	·	520 m	MPC · JPL
856572	2011 UF_{252}	—	October 26, 2011	Haleakala	Pan-STARRS 1	·	1.2 km	MPC · JPL
856573	2011 US_{255}	—	October 29, 2011	Haleakala	Pan-STARRS 1	H	310 m	MPC · JPL
856574	2011 UG_{256}	—	October 31, 2011	Kitt Peak	Spacewatch	AMO	310 m	MPC · JPL
856575	2011 US_{260}	—	September 27, 2011	Mount Lemmon	Mount Lemmon Survey	·	830 m	MPC · JPL
856576	2011 UE_{261}	—	October 23, 2011	Kitt Peak	Spacewatch	·	1.7 km	MPC · JPL
856577	2011 UK_{261}	—	October 25, 2011	Haleakala	Pan-STARRS 1	EUN	840 m	MPC · JPL
856578	2011 UR_{261}	—	November 24, 2008	Mount Lemmon	Mount Lemmon Survey	·	510 m	MPC · JPL
856579	2011 UW_{262}	—	October 25, 2011	Haleakala	Pan-STARRS 1	·	1.5 km	MPC · JPL
856580	2011 UQ_{263}	—	October 19, 2006	Mount Lemmon	Mount Lemmon Survey	·	1.2 km	MPC · JPL
856581	2011 UF_{265}	—	October 26, 2011	Kitt Peak	Spacewatch	·	970 m	MPC · JPL
856582	2011 UH_{265}	—	October 26, 2011	Kitt Peak	Spacewatch	·	1.2 km	MPC · JPL
856583	2011 UW_{268}	—	October 28, 2011	Mount Lemmon	Mount Lemmon Survey	DOR	2.0 km	MPC · JPL
856584	2011 UO_{270}	—	September 19, 1998	Sacramento Peak	SDSS	·	1.2 km	MPC · JPL
856585	2011 UT_{270}	—	September 24, 2011	Haleakala	Pan-STARRS 1	·	1.4 km	MPC · JPL
856586	2011 UK_{271}	—	October 29, 2011	Les Engarouines	L. Bernasconi	·	1.6 km	MPC · JPL
856587	2011 UF_{272}	—	October 30, 2011	Mount Lemmon	Mount Lemmon Survey	EOS	1.4 km	MPC · JPL
856588	2011 UY_{276}	—	September 15, 2006	Kitt Peak	Spacewatch	MRX	680 m	MPC · JPL
856589	2011 UA_{280}	—	October 20, 2011	Kitt Peak	Spacewatch	BRA	1.1 km	MPC · JPL
856590	2011 UB_{283}	—	October 28, 2011	Kitt Peak	Spacewatch	NYS	630 m	MPC · JPL
856591	2011 UO_{285}	—	September 21, 2011	Kitt Peak	Spacewatch	PHO	690 m	MPC · JPL
856592	2011 UD_{287}	—	September 21, 2011	Les Engarouines	L. Bernasconi	·	840 m	MPC · JPL
856593	2011 UL_{287}	—	October 1, 2011	Kitt Peak	Spacewatch	·	830 m	MPC · JPL
856594	2011 UQ_{294}	—	October 26, 2011	Bergisch Gladbach	W. Bickel	MAS	520 m	MPC · JPL
856595	2011 UZ_{295}	—	October 21, 2011	Kitt Peak	Spacewatch	·	1.3 km	MPC · JPL
856596	2011 UG_{299}	—	October 29, 2011	Kitt Peak	Spacewatch	·	730 m	MPC · JPL
856597	2011 UP_{299}	—	October 29, 2011	Kitt Peak	Spacewatch	MAS	460 m	MPC · JPL
856598	2011 UG_{302}	—	September 29, 2011	Kitt Peak	Spacewatch	·	1.9 km	MPC · JPL
856599	2011 UB_{305}	—	October 31, 2011	Bergisch Gladbach	W. Bickel	·	1.2 km	MPC · JPL
856600	2011 UN_{306}	—	October 24, 2011	Mayhill-ISON	L. Elenin	·	1.9 km	MPC · JPL

== 856601–856700 ==
back to top

Designation			Discovery			Properties		Ref
Permanent	Provisional	Named after	Date	Site	Discoverer(s)	Category	Diam.	Ref
856601	2011 US_{307}	—	October 28, 2011	Kitt Peak	Spacewatch	·	680 m	MPC · JPL
856602	2011 UA_{309}	—	September 20, 2011	Mount Lemmon	Mount Lemmon Survey	·	1.4 km	MPC · JPL
856603	2011 UB_{309}	—	September 28, 2011	Kitt Peak	Spacewatch	·	770 m	MPC · JPL
856604	2011 UE_{309}	—	October 21, 2011	Kitt Peak	Spacewatch	·	1.2 km	MPC · JPL
856605	2011 UW_{311}	—	October 30, 2011	Kitt Peak	Spacewatch	·	1.5 km	MPC · JPL
856606	2011 UU_{312}	—	August 18, 2006	Kitt Peak	Spacewatch	·	1.3 km	MPC · JPL
856607	2011 UM_{313}	—	October 30, 2011	Kitt Peak	Spacewatch	·	720 m	MPC · JPL
856608	2011 UF_{314}	—	October 18, 2011	Kitt Peak	Spacewatch	·	440 m	MPC · JPL
856609	2011 UH_{314}	—	October 22, 2011	Kitt Peak	Spacewatch	·	1.1 km	MPC · JPL
856610	2011 UO_{324}	—	September 29, 2011	Kitt Peak	Spacewatch	·	480 m	MPC · JPL
856611	2011 UA_{326}	—	October 20, 2011	Mount Lemmon	Mount Lemmon Survey	·	930 m	MPC · JPL
856612	2011 UH_{326}	—	October 20, 2011	Mount Lemmon	Mount Lemmon Survey	H	410 m	MPC · JPL
856613	2011 UE_{327}	—	October 22, 2011	Mount Lemmon	Mount Lemmon Survey	H	480 m	MPC · JPL
856614	2011 UJ_{327}	—	October 22, 2011	Mount Lemmon	Mount Lemmon Survey	·	740 m	MPC · JPL
856615	2011 UV_{327}	—	October 22, 2011	Kitt Peak	Spacewatch	·	630 m	MPC · JPL
856616	2011 UW_{331}	—	October 19, 2011	Kitt Peak	Spacewatch	·	2.2 km	MPC · JPL
856617	2011 UG_{335}	—	September 21, 2011	Haleakala	Pan-STARRS 1	·	2.5 km	MPC · JPL
856618	2011 UU_{347}	—	October 19, 2011	Mount Lemmon	Mount Lemmon Survey	·	460 m	MPC · JPL
856619	2011 UT_{350}	—	October 9, 2004	Kitt Peak	Spacewatch	·	500 m	MPC · JPL
856620	2011 UA_{351}	—	October 19, 2011	Mount Lemmon	Mount Lemmon Survey	·	1.5 km	MPC · JPL
856621	2011 UK_{351}	—	September 27, 2011	Mount Lemmon	Mount Lemmon Survey	H	390 m	MPC · JPL
856622	2011 UL_{351}	—	August 23, 2006	Mauna Kea	D. D. Balam	·	1.5 km	MPC · JPL
856623	2011 UM_{351}	—	August 10, 2004	Anderson Mesa	LONEOS	·	550 m	MPC · JPL
856624	2011 UL_{357}	—	October 20, 2011	Mount Lemmon	Mount Lemmon Survey	·	1.2 km	MPC · JPL
856625	2011 UU_{363}	—	September 28, 2011	Kitt Peak	Spacewatch	MAS	540 m	MPC · JPL
856626	2011 UT_{364}	—	October 22, 2011	Mount Lemmon	Mount Lemmon Survey	·	1.9 km	MPC · JPL
856627	2011 UG_{365}	—	November 19, 2006	Kitt Peak	Spacewatch	·	1.6 km	MPC · JPL
856628	2011 UB_{367}	—	September 28, 2011	Kitt Peak	Spacewatch	·	800 m	MPC · JPL
856629	2011 UE_{368}	—	October 22, 2011	Mount Lemmon	Mount Lemmon Survey	·	730 m	MPC · JPL
856630	2011 UE_{374}	—	October 23, 2011	Haleakala	Pan-STARRS 1	H	400 m	MPC · JPL
856631	2011 UV_{381}	—	November 19, 2007	Mount Lemmon	Mount Lemmon Survey	(5)	1.1 km	MPC · JPL
856632	2011 UQ_{384}	—	October 24, 2011	Haleakala	Pan-STARRS 1	·	700 m	MPC · JPL
856633	2011 UD_{385}	—	September 27, 2011	Mount Lemmon	Mount Lemmon Survey	·	520 m	MPC · JPL
856634	2011 UF_{385}	—	November 1, 2006	Kitt Peak	Spacewatch	·	980 m	MPC · JPL
856635	2011 UU_{391}	—	October 26, 2011	Bergisch Gladbach	W. Bickel	·	1.3 km	MPC · JPL
856636	2011 UR_{393}	—	October 28, 2011	Mount Lemmon	Mount Lemmon Survey	·	1.3 km	MPC · JPL
856637	2011 UT_{394}	—	September 26, 2011	Kitt Peak	Spacewatch	·	1.9 km	MPC · JPL
856638	2011 UZ_{394}	—	September 26, 2011	Kitt Peak	Spacewatch	·	2.0 km	MPC · JPL
856639	2011 UC_{396}	—	February 2, 2008	Kitt Peak	Spacewatch	·	1.6 km	MPC · JPL
856640	2011 US_{397}	—	January 19, 2008	Mount Lemmon	Mount Lemmon Survey	DOR	1.7 km	MPC · JPL
856641	2011 UA_{401}	—	October 18, 2011	Mount Lemmon	Mount Lemmon Survey	THM	1.7 km	MPC · JPL
856642	2011 UG_{401}	—	October 19, 2011	Kitt Peak	Spacewatch	·	430 m	MPC · JPL
856643	2011 UK_{403}	—	October 23, 2011	Haleakala	Pan-STARRS 1	EUP	2.6 km	MPC · JPL
856644	2011 UP_{405}	—	September 28, 2011	Kitt Peak	Spacewatch	·	880 m	MPC · JPL
856645	2011 UO_{406}	—	September 29, 2011	Kitt Peak	Spacewatch	·	930 m	MPC · JPL
856646	2011 UK_{410}	—	October 30, 2011	Mount Lemmon	Mount Lemmon Survey	·	920 m	MPC · JPL
856647	2011 UV_{413}	—	October 31, 2011	Kitt Peak	Spacewatch	·	1.9 km	MPC · JPL
856648	2011 UZ_{416}	—	October 24, 2011	Haleakala	Pan-STARRS 1	GEF	820 m	MPC · JPL
856649	2011 UA_{420}	—	July 28, 2014	Haleakala	Pan-STARRS 1	·	670 m	MPC · JPL
856650	2011 UG_{420}	—	October 24, 2011	Mount Lemmon	Mount Lemmon Survey	·	900 m	MPC · JPL
856651	2011 UY_{420}	—	October 27, 2011	Mount Lemmon	Mount Lemmon Survey	·	720 m	MPC · JPL
856652	2011 UJ_{423}	—	October 27, 2011	Mount Lemmon	Mount Lemmon Survey	·	1.2 km	MPC · JPL
856653	2011 UM_{423}	—	September 23, 2014	Mount Lemmon	Mount Lemmon Survey	·	500 m	MPC · JPL
856654	2011 US_{423}	—	October 26, 2011	Haleakala	Pan-STARRS 1	·	580 m	MPC · JPL
856655	2011 UK_{425}	—	October 25, 2011	Haleakala	Pan-STARRS 1	·	1.9 km	MPC · JPL
856656	2011 UW_{425}	—	October 24, 2011	Haleakala	Pan-STARRS 1	PHO	670 m	MPC · JPL
856657	2011 UF_{426}	—	October 23, 2011	Haleakala	Pan-STARRS 1	·	1.7 km	MPC · JPL
856658	2011 UV_{427}	—	October 28, 2011	Mount Lemmon	Mount Lemmon Survey	·	1.3 km	MPC · JPL
856659	2011 UE_{429}	—	October 31, 2011	Kitt Peak	Spacewatch	·	1.8 km	MPC · JPL
856660	2011 UL_{429}	—	October 23, 2011	Mount Lemmon	Mount Lemmon Survey	·	830 m	MPC · JPL
856661	2011 UQ_{429}	—	October 25, 2011	Haleakala	Pan-STARRS 1	·	1.4 km	MPC · JPL
856662	2011 UD_{430}	—	October 24, 2011	Haleakala	Pan-STARRS 1	·	1.6 km	MPC · JPL
856663	2011 UN_{430}	—	October 18, 2011	Mount Lemmon	Mount Lemmon Survey	·	2.1 km	MPC · JPL
856664	2011 UO_{430}	—	October 18, 2011	Haleakala	Pan-STARRS 1	·	1.7 km	MPC · JPL
856665	2011 UZ_{430}	—	October 26, 2011	Haleakala	Pan-STARRS 1	·	520 m	MPC · JPL
856666	2011 UM_{431}	—	October 24, 2011	Haleakala	Pan-STARRS 1	(5)	780 m	MPC · JPL
856667	2011 UG_{432}	—	October 24, 2011	Haleakala	Pan-STARRS 1	·	780 m	MPC · JPL
856668	2011 UY_{432}	—	October 18, 2011	Catalina	CSS	TIN	590 m	MPC · JPL
856669	2011 UW_{434}	—	May 8, 2014	Haleakala	Pan-STARRS 1	·	760 m	MPC · JPL
856670	2011 UY_{434}	—	October 18, 2011	Haleakala	Pan-STARRS 1	H	410 m	MPC · JPL
856671	2011 UD_{435}	—	October 25, 2011	Haleakala	Pan-STARRS 1	·	650 m	MPC · JPL
856672	2011 UJ_{435}	—	October 21, 2011	Mount Lemmon	Mount Lemmon Survey	H	360 m	MPC · JPL
856673	2011 UN_{435}	—	May 28, 2014	Mount Lemmon	Mount Lemmon Survey	MAR	700 m	MPC · JPL
856674	2011 UR_{435}	—	May 6, 2014	Haleakala	Pan-STARRS 1	·	960 m	MPC · JPL
856675	2011 UY_{435}	—	November 18, 2016	Mount Lemmon	Mount Lemmon Survey	·	1.8 km	MPC · JPL
856676	2011 UZ_{435}	—	October 24, 2011	Haleakala	Pan-STARRS 1	·	1.6 km	MPC · JPL
856677	2011 UC_{436}	—	June 27, 2014	Haleakala	Pan-STARRS 1	·	700 m	MPC · JPL
856678	2011 UX_{436}	—	October 8, 2015	Haleakala	Pan-STARRS 1	·	990 m	MPC · JPL
856679	2011 UZ_{437}	—	March 13, 2016	Haleakala	Pan-STARRS 1	·	630 m	MPC · JPL
856680	2011 US_{438}	—	April 8, 2014	Mount Lemmon	Mount Lemmon Survey	·	1.5 km	MPC · JPL
856681	2011 UW_{438}	—	October 24, 2011	Haleakala	Pan-STARRS 1	·	670 m	MPC · JPL
856682	2011 UA_{440}	—	September 20, 2011	Kitt Peak	Spacewatch	·	650 m	MPC · JPL
856683	2011 UE_{440}	—	October 18, 2011	Haleakala	Pan-STARRS 1	TIN	820 m	MPC · JPL
856684	2011 UW_{440}	—	September 12, 2015	Haleakala	Pan-STARRS 1	·	1.0 km	MPC · JPL
856685	2011 UY_{440}	—	October 20, 2011	Mount Lemmon	Mount Lemmon Survey	JUN	640 m	MPC · JPL
856686	2011 UJ_{442}	—	October 20, 2011	Mount Lemmon	Mount Lemmon Survey	·	630 m	MPC · JPL
856687	2011 UM_{442}	—	October 28, 2011	Mount Lemmon	Mount Lemmon Survey	·	2.2 km	MPC · JPL
856688	2011 UP_{442}	—	January 10, 2013	Haleakala	Pan-STARRS 1	·	1.3 km	MPC · JPL
856689	2011 US_{442}	—	October 24, 2011	Haleakala	Pan-STARRS 1	·	930 m	MPC · JPL
856690	2011 UX_{442}	—	October 20, 2011	Mount Lemmon	Mount Lemmon Survey	KOR	970 m	MPC · JPL
856691	2011 UE_{443}	—	February 14, 2013	Haleakala	Pan-STARRS 1	·	2.1 km	MPC · JPL
856692	2011 UH_{444}	—	June 10, 2015	Haleakala	Pan-STARRS 1	·	1.1 km	MPC · JPL
856693	2011 US_{445}	—	July 19, 2015	Haleakala	Pan-STARRS 2	AGN	870 m	MPC · JPL
856694	2011 UU_{446}	—	October 26, 2011	Haleakala	Pan-STARRS 1	KOR	1.1 km	MPC · JPL
856695	2011 UP_{452}	—	October 20, 2011	Mount Lemmon	Mount Lemmon Survey	MAS	560 m	MPC · JPL
856696	2011 UW_{454}	—	October 23, 2011	Mount Lemmon	Mount Lemmon Survey	·	1.7 km	MPC · JPL
856697	2011 UJ_{456}	—	August 3, 2016	Haleakala	Pan-STARRS 1	·	1.9 km	MPC · JPL
856698	2011 UQ_{457}	—	October 22, 2011	Mount Lemmon	Mount Lemmon Survey	·	540 m	MPC · JPL
856699	2011 UN_{458}	—	October 26, 2011	Haleakala	Pan-STARRS 1	KOR	1.0 km	MPC · JPL
856700	2011 UW_{458}	—	October 23, 2011	Mount Lemmon	Mount Lemmon Survey	·	1.3 km	MPC · JPL

== 856701–856800 ==
back to top

Designation			Discovery			Properties		Ref
Permanent	Provisional	Named after	Date	Site	Discoverer(s)	Category	Diam.	Ref
856701	2011 UH_{459}	—	October 26, 2011	Haleakala	Pan-STARRS 1	·	1.3 km	MPC · JPL
856702	2011 UP_{459}	—	October 26, 2011	Haleakala	Pan-STARRS 1	KOR	1.1 km	MPC · JPL
856703	2011 UZ_{459}	—	October 26, 2011	Haleakala	Pan-STARRS 1	·	1.5 km	MPC · JPL
856704	2011 UA_{460}	—	October 26, 2011	Haleakala	Pan-STARRS 1	KOR	1.0 km	MPC · JPL
856705	2011 UO_{460}	—	October 20, 2011	Mount Lemmon	Mount Lemmon Survey	·	610 m	MPC · JPL
856706	2011 UV_{460}	—	October 24, 2011	Haleakala	Pan-STARRS 1	·	1.1 km	MPC · JPL
856707	2011 UL_{463}	—	October 30, 2011	Kitt Peak	Spacewatch	·	1.3 km	MPC · JPL
856708	2011 UV_{463}	—	October 26, 2011	Haleakala	Pan-STARRS 1	·	1.4 km	MPC · JPL
856709	2011 UR_{464}	—	October 20, 2011	Mount Lemmon	Mount Lemmon Survey	·	1.3 km	MPC · JPL
856710	2011 UQ_{467}	—	October 23, 2011	Kitt Peak	Spacewatch	·	1.1 km	MPC · JPL
856711	2011 UT_{467}	—	October 26, 2011	Haleakala	Pan-STARRS 1	·	1.2 km	MPC · JPL
856712	2011 UD_{468}	—	October 24, 2011	Haleakala	Pan-STARRS 1	·	1.3 km	MPC · JPL
856713	2011 UT_{468}	—	October 30, 2011	Westfield	International Astronomical Search Collaboration	·	1.3 km	MPC · JPL
856714	2011 UF_{470}	—	October 24, 2011	Haleakala	Pan-STARRS 1	(16286)	1.3 km	MPC · JPL
856715	2011 UL_{470}	—	March 19, 2013	Haleakala	Pan-STARRS 1	·	760 m	MPC · JPL
856716	2011 UR_{470}	—	October 20, 2011	Mount Lemmon	Mount Lemmon Survey	·	910 m	MPC · JPL
856717	2011 UT_{471}	—	October 20, 2011	Mount Lemmon	Mount Lemmon Survey	·	1.2 km	MPC · JPL
856718	2011 UZ_{471}	—	October 24, 2011	Haleakala	Pan-STARRS 1	NYS	670 m	MPC · JPL
856719	2011 UA_{472}	—	October 20, 2011	Mount Lemmon	Mount Lemmon Survey	·	540 m	MPC · JPL
856720	2011 UB_{472}	—	October 30, 2011	Kitt Peak	Spacewatch	V	520 m	MPC · JPL
856721	2011 UM_{472}	—	October 18, 2011	Mount Lemmon	Mount Lemmon Survey	·	1.6 km	MPC · JPL
856722	2011 US_{472}	—	October 23, 2011	Haleakala	Pan-STARRS 1	·	1.9 km	MPC · JPL
856723	2011 UL_{474}	—	October 22, 2011	Mount Lemmon	Mount Lemmon Survey	·	630 m	MPC · JPL
856724	2011 UE_{475}	—	October 24, 2011	Haleakala	Pan-STARRS 1	BRA	1 km	MPC · JPL
856725	2011 UW_{475}	—	October 23, 2011	Kitt Peak	Spacewatch	·	400 m	MPC · JPL
856726	2011 UA_{476}	—	October 28, 2011	Mount Lemmon	Mount Lemmon Survey	(2076)	630 m	MPC · JPL
856727	2011 UV_{476}	—	October 26, 2011	Haleakala	Pan-STARRS 1	·	1.5 km	MPC · JPL
856728	2011 UO_{477}	—	October 21, 2011	Kitt Peak	Spacewatch	NYS	850 m	MPC · JPL
856729	2011 UW_{478}	—	October 25, 2011	Haleakala	Pan-STARRS 1	·	1.3 km	MPC · JPL
856730	2011 UB_{479}	—	October 24, 2011	Haleakala	Pan-STARRS 1	EOS	1.5 km	MPC · JPL
856731	2011 UM_{479}	—	October 24, 2011	Haleakala	Pan-STARRS 1	EOS	1.1 km	MPC · JPL
856732	2011 UT_{479}	—	October 24, 2011	Haleakala	Pan-STARRS 1	EOS	1.2 km	MPC · JPL
856733	2011 UA_{480}	—	October 26, 2011	Haleakala	Pan-STARRS 1	V	470 m	MPC · JPL
856734	2011 UR_{480}	—	October 23, 2011	Mount Lemmon	Mount Lemmon Survey	H	320 m	MPC · JPL
856735	2011 UE_{481}	—	October 30, 2011	Mount Lemmon	Mount Lemmon Survey	·	1.3 km	MPC · JPL
856736	2011 UR_{481}	—	October 24, 2011	Haleakala	Pan-STARRS 1	·	470 m	MPC · JPL
856737	2011 UJ_{482}	—	October 24, 2011	Haleakala	Pan-STARRS 1	·	340 m	MPC · JPL
856738	2011 UN_{485}	—	October 23, 2011	Mount Lemmon	Mount Lemmon Survey	·	730 m	MPC · JPL
856739	2011 UE_{487}	—	October 20, 2011	Mount Lemmon	Mount Lemmon Survey	·	680 m	MPC · JPL
856740	2011 UT_{487}	—	October 20, 2011	Mount Lemmon	Mount Lemmon Survey	·	1.5 km	MPC · JPL
856741	2011 UP_{488}	—	October 25, 2011	Haleakala	Pan-STARRS 1	·	600 m	MPC · JPL
856742	2011 UO_{490}	—	October 19, 2011	Mount Lemmon	Mount Lemmon Survey	THM	1.9 km	MPC · JPL
856743	2011 UE_{491}	—	October 24, 2011	Haleakala	Pan-STARRS 1	·	1.3 km	MPC · JPL
856744	2011 UQ_{491}	—	October 24, 2011	Haleakala	Pan-STARRS 1	·	1.5 km	MPC · JPL
856745	2011 UE_{492}	—	October 23, 2011	Mount Lemmon	Mount Lemmon Survey	·	900 m	MPC · JPL
856746	2011 UX_{500}	—	October 20, 2011	Mount Lemmon	Mount Lemmon Survey	·	660 m	MPC · JPL
856747	2011 US_{501}	—	October 18, 2011	Haleakala	Pan-STARRS 1	TIN	730 m	MPC · JPL
856748	2011 UE_{504}	—	October 17, 2011	Kitt Peak	Spacewatch	ADE	1.3 km	MPC · JPL
856749	2011 UA_{505}	—	October 22, 2011	Mount Lemmon	Mount Lemmon Survey	·	1.2 km	MPC · JPL
856750	2011 UM_{510}	—	October 28, 2011	Mount Lemmon	Mount Lemmon Survey	·	1.3 km	MPC · JPL
856751	2011 UN_{510}	—	October 18, 2011	Haleakala	Pan-STARRS 1	·	1.5 km	MPC · JPL
856752	2011 UR_{510}	—	October 29, 2011	Kitt Peak	Spacewatch	·	1.2 km	MPC · JPL
856753	2011 VC_{2}	—	November 1, 2011	ESA OGS	ESA OGS	H	380 m	MPC · JPL
856754	2011 VW_{2}	—	October 30, 2011	Catalina	CSS	·	1.3 km	MPC · JPL
856755	2011 VE_{3}	—	November 1, 2011	Catalina	CSS	·	1.1 km	MPC · JPL
856756	2011 VR_{3}	—	September 5, 2011	La Sagra	OAM	·	2.6 km	MPC · JPL
856757	2011 VX_{3}	—	February 2, 2008	Mount Lemmon	Mount Lemmon Survey	EOS	1.3 km	MPC · JPL
856758	2011 VX_{5}	—	November 1, 2011	Catalina	CSS	PHO	950 m	MPC · JPL
856759	2011 VY_{7}	—	January 18, 2008	Mount Lemmon	Mount Lemmon Survey	·	940 m	MPC · JPL
856760	2011 VF_{8}	—	November 3, 2011	Catalina	CSS	·	1.5 km	MPC · JPL
856761	2011 VN_{10}	—	October 30, 2011	Kitt Peak	Spacewatch	·	920 m	MPC · JPL
856762	2011 VS_{11}	—	November 1, 2011	Kitt Peak	Spacewatch	·	460 m	MPC · JPL
856763	2011 VT_{11}	—	May 25, 2006	Mauna Kea	P. A. Wiegert	·	560 m	MPC · JPL
856764	2011 VF_{12}	—	October 26, 2011	Haleakala	Pan-STARRS 1	·	1 km	MPC · JPL
856765	2011 VA_{14}	—	April 7, 2008	Mount Lemmon	Mount Lemmon Survey	·	1.5 km	MPC · JPL
856766	2011 VF_{19}	—	October 19, 2011	Kitt Peak	Spacewatch	TIR	2.4 km	MPC · JPL
856767	2011 VU_{19}	—	December 15, 2006	Kitt Peak	Spacewatch	·	1.7 km	MPC · JPL
856768	2011 VN_{20}	—	October 7, 2004	Kitt Peak	Spacewatch	·	460 m	MPC · JPL
856769	2011 VT_{20}	—	November 1, 2011	Kitt Peak	Spacewatch	MAS	460 m	MPC · JPL
856770	2011 VH_{22}	—	November 3, 2011	Mount Lemmon	Mount Lemmon Survey	TIR	2.8 km	MPC · JPL
856771	2011 VZ_{24}	—	November 5, 2011	Haleakala	Pan-STARRS 1	SDO	154 km	MPC · JPL
856772	2011 VV_{27}	—	July 25, 2014	Haleakala	Pan-STARRS 1	V	400 m	MPC · JPL
856773	2011 VL_{28}	—	November 5, 2011	Haleakala	Pan-STARRS 1	·	630 m	MPC · JPL
856774	2011 VQ_{29}	—	September 12, 2015	Haleakala	Pan-STARRS 1	·	1.1 km	MPC · JPL
856775	2011 VF_{30}	—	November 3, 2011	Mount Lemmon	Mount Lemmon Survey	·	780 m	MPC · JPL
856776	2011 VA_{38}	—	November 1, 2011	Mount Lemmon	Mount Lemmon Survey	·	1.1 km	MPC · JPL
856777	2011 WN	—	October 1, 2011	Kitt Peak	Spacewatch	·	1.3 km	MPC · JPL
856778	2011 WX_{1}	—	October 8, 2007	Mount Lemmon	Mount Lemmon Survey	MAS	490 m	MPC · JPL
856779	2011 WG_{3}	—	November 16, 2011	Mount Lemmon	Mount Lemmon Survey	·	920 m	MPC · JPL
856780	2011 WL_{3}	—	October 26, 2011	Haleakala	Pan-STARRS 1	·	970 m	MPC · JPL
856781	2011 WA_{7}	—	October 24, 2011	Haleakala	Pan-STARRS 1	·	660 m	MPC · JPL
856782	2011 WD_{7}	—	September 24, 2011	Mount Lemmon	Mount Lemmon Survey	MAS	390 m	MPC · JPL
856783	2011 WE_{7}	—	October 22, 2011	Kitt Peak	Spacewatch	NYS	540 m	MPC · JPL
856784	2011 WK_{7}	—	November 16, 2011	Mount Lemmon	Mount Lemmon Survey	KOR	970 m	MPC · JPL
856785	2011 WT_{7}	—	November 16, 2011	Mount Lemmon	Mount Lemmon Survey	·	500 m	MPC · JPL
856786	2011 WW_{7}	—	September 30, 2005	Mount Lemmon	Mount Lemmon Survey	THM	1.5 km	MPC · JPL
856787	2011 WT_{12}	—	October 30, 2011	Mount Lemmon	Mount Lemmon Survey	·	720 m	MPC · JPL
856788	2011 WS_{18}	—	September 28, 2011	Kitt Peak	Spacewatch	(883)	450 m	MPC · JPL
856789	2011 WC_{19}	—	November 17, 2011	Kitt Peak	Spacewatch	·	540 m	MPC · JPL
856790	2011 WQ_{22}	—	October 26, 2011	Haleakala	Pan-STARRS 1	EUN	660 m	MPC · JPL
856791	2011 WA_{23}	—	October 26, 2011	Haleakala	Pan-STARRS 1	·	1.9 km	MPC · JPL
856792	2011 WS_{28}	—	November 21, 2011	Les Engarouines	L. Bernasconi	·	1.7 km	MPC · JPL
856793	2011 WO_{30}	—	October 25, 2011	Haleakala	Pan-STARRS 1	·	470 m	MPC · JPL
856794	2011 WH_{31}	—	January 1, 2009	Kitt Peak	Spacewatch	·	530 m	MPC · JPL
856795	2011 WF_{33}	—	November 18, 2011	Mount Lemmon	Mount Lemmon Survey	·	1.3 km	MPC · JPL
856796	2011 WB_{34}	—	October 19, 2011	Mount Lemmon	Mount Lemmon Survey	·	470 m	MPC · JPL
856797	2011 WV_{34}	—	September 24, 2011	Mount Lemmon	Mount Lemmon Survey	·	1.6 km	MPC · JPL
856798	2011 WJ_{36}	—	November 15, 2011	Mount Lemmon	Mount Lemmon Survey	·	1.1 km	MPC · JPL
856799	2011 WX_{36}	—	November 3, 2011	Catalina	CSS	H	430 m	MPC · JPL
856800	2011 WC_{37}	—	October 31, 2011	Kitt Peak	Spacewatch	·	1.3 km	MPC · JPL

== 856801–856900 ==
back to top

Designation			Discovery			Properties		Ref
Permanent	Provisional	Named after	Date	Site	Discoverer(s)	Category	Diam.	Ref
856801	2011 WK_{40}	—	October 28, 2011	Mount Lemmon	Mount Lemmon Survey	·	1.3 km	MPC · JPL
856802	2011 WG_{41}	—	November 24, 2011	Piszkés-tető	K. Sárneczky, G. Marton	·	740 m	MPC · JPL
856803	2011 WD_{44}	—	January 17, 2007	Kitt Peak	Spacewatch	·	1.9 km	MPC · JPL
856804	2011 WV_{46}	—	October 26, 2011	Mayhill-ISON	L. Elenin	DOR	1.9 km	MPC · JPL
856805	2011 WD_{48}	—	October 26, 2011	Haleakala	Pan-STARRS 1	·	660 m	MPC · JPL
856806	2011 WG_{54}	—	November 24, 2011	Haleakala	Pan-STARRS 1	·	440 m	MPC · JPL
856807	2011 WY_{59}	—	October 26, 2011	Haleakala	Pan-STARRS 1	·	1.2 km	MPC · JPL
856808	2011 WD_{64}	—	November 24, 2011	Mount Lemmon	Mount Lemmon Survey	(13314)	1.4 km	MPC · JPL
856809	2011 WO_{64}	—	November 25, 2011	Haleakala	Pan-STARRS 1	LIX	2.4 km	MPC · JPL
856810	2011 WP_{67}	—	November 26, 2011	Mount Lemmon	Mount Lemmon Survey	·	1.6 km	MPC · JPL
856811	2011 WA_{70}	—	October 25, 2011	Haleakala	Pan-STARRS 1	·	950 m	MPC · JPL
856812	2011 WB_{70}	—	November 3, 2006	Mount Lemmon	Mount Lemmon Survey	·	1.6 km	MPC · JPL
856813	2011 WR_{71}	—	October 21, 2011	Mount Lemmon	Mount Lemmon Survey	·	1.2 km	MPC · JPL
856814	2011 WB_{74}	—	November 28, 2011	Mount Lemmon	Mount Lemmon Survey	EOS	1.3 km	MPC · JPL
856815	2011 WJ_{78}	—	October 27, 2011	Mount Lemmon	Mount Lemmon Survey	·	1.3 km	MPC · JPL
856816	2011 WB_{79}	—	November 24, 2011	Haleakala	Pan-STARRS 1	·	1.2 km	MPC · JPL
856817	2011 WN_{80}	—	January 13, 2008	Kitt Peak	Spacewatch	·	1.0 km	MPC · JPL
856818	2011 WO_{80}	—	November 16, 2011	Mount Lemmon	Mount Lemmon Survey	·	720 m	MPC · JPL
856819	2011 WW_{80}	—	October 22, 2011	Kitt Peak	Spacewatch	EOS	1.2 km	MPC · JPL
856820	2011 WW_{81}	—	October 26, 2011	Haleakala	Pan-STARRS 1	CLA	1.1 km	MPC · JPL
856821	2011 WE_{82}	—	September 8, 2000	Kitt Peak	Spacewatch	·	640 m	MPC · JPL
856822	2011 WL_{82}	—	October 26, 2011	Haleakala	Pan-STARRS 1	·	880 m	MPC · JPL
856823	2011 WO_{82}	—	September 27, 2006	Kitt Peak	Spacewatch	·	1.2 km	MPC · JPL
856824	2011 WL_{83}	—	October 21, 2011	Mount Lemmon	Mount Lemmon Survey	(5)	940 m	MPC · JPL
856825	2011 WP_{83}	—	October 26, 2011	Haleakala	Pan-STARRS 1	·	1.3 km	MPC · JPL
856826	2011 WD_{86}	—	January 18, 2008	Kitt Peak	Spacewatch	HOF	1.9 km	MPC · JPL
856827	2011 WD_{89}	—	December 16, 2006	Kitt Peak	Spacewatch	·	1.7 km	MPC · JPL
856828	2011 WE_{90}	—	November 24, 2011	Mount Lemmon	Mount Lemmon Survey	·	840 m	MPC · JPL
856829	2011 WU_{91}	—	November 17, 2011	Mount Lemmon	Mount Lemmon Survey	·	1.1 km	MPC · JPL
856830	2011 WF_{92}	—	November 27, 2011	Kitt Peak	Spacewatch	·	870 m	MPC · JPL
856831	2011 WL_{100}	—	November 26, 2011	XuYi	PMO NEO Survey Program	·	700 m	MPC · JPL
856832	2011 WB_{101}	—	October 26, 2011	Haleakala	Pan-STARRS 1	·	1.1 km	MPC · JPL
856833	2011 WF_{103}	—	October 20, 2011	Mount Lemmon	Mount Lemmon Survey	DOR	1.9 km	MPC · JPL
856834	2011 WU_{104}	—	November 28, 2011	Mount Lemmon	Mount Lemmon Survey	·	1.4 km	MPC · JPL
856835	2011 WF_{106}	—	October 25, 2011	Haleakala	Pan-STARRS 1	·	1.2 km	MPC · JPL
856836	2011 WV_{110}	—	October 26, 2011	Haleakala	Pan-STARRS 1	·	920 m	MPC · JPL
856837	2011 WP_{111}	—	November 15, 2011	Kitt Peak	Spacewatch	(895)	3.1 km	MPC · JPL
856838	2011 WH_{120}	—	October 26, 2011	Haleakala	Pan-STARRS 1	·	860 m	MPC · JPL
856839	2011 WJ_{120}	—	November 2, 2011	Mount Lemmon	Mount Lemmon Survey	·	680 m	MPC · JPL
856840	2011 WC_{123}	—	October 21, 2011	Mount Lemmon	Mount Lemmon Survey	·	490 m	MPC · JPL
856841	2011 WJ_{130}	—	September 21, 2011	Mount Lemmon	Mount Lemmon Survey	·	600 m	MPC · JPL
856842	2011 WE_{131}	—	October 26, 2011	Haleakala	Pan-STARRS 1	TIN	800 m	MPC · JPL
856843	2011 WT_{131}	—	October 26, 2011	Haleakala	Pan-STARRS 1	·	790 m	MPC · JPL
856844	2011 WC_{132}	—	October 5, 2000	Kitt Peak	Spacewatch	·	1.9 km	MPC · JPL
856845	2011 WS_{133}	—	November 18, 2011	Siding Spring	SSS	GAL	1.1 km	MPC · JPL
856846	2011 WT_{141}	—	November 22, 2011	Mount Lemmon	Mount Lemmon Survey	·	1.7 km	MPC · JPL
856847	2011 WF_{142}	—	October 30, 2011	Mount Lemmon	Mount Lemmon Survey	THM	1.5 km	MPC · JPL
856848	2011 WL_{148}	—	October 23, 2011	Haleakala	Pan-STARRS 1	·	1.2 km	MPC · JPL
856849	2011 WM_{152}	—	October 26, 2011	Mayhill-ISON	L. Elenin	·	1.6 km	MPC · JPL
856850	2011 WX_{158}	—	November 17, 2011	Mount Lemmon	Mount Lemmon Survey	·	2.2 km	MPC · JPL
856851	2011 WD_{161}	—	November 25, 2011	Haleakala	Pan-STARRS 1	NYS	570 m	MPC · JPL
856852	2011 WQ_{164}	—	November 18, 2011	Mount Lemmon	Mount Lemmon Survey	·	1.4 km	MPC · JPL
856853	2011 WT_{166}	—	November 18, 2011	Mount Lemmon	Mount Lemmon Survey	EUN	750 m	MPC · JPL
856854	2011 WL_{167}	—	October 3, 2015	Mount Lemmon	Mount Lemmon Survey	EUN	720 m	MPC · JPL
856855	2011 WQ_{167}	—	November 24, 2011	Mount Lemmon	Mount Lemmon Survey	·	1.2 km	MPC · JPL
856856	2011 WU_{167}	—	November 17, 2011	Mount Lemmon	Mount Lemmon Survey	·	830 m	MPC · JPL
856857	2011 WE_{168}	—	February 23, 2018	Mount Lemmon	Mount Lemmon Survey	H	440 m	MPC · JPL
856858	2011 WZ_{168}	—	October 26, 2011	Haleakala	Pan-STARRS 1	·	520 m	MPC · JPL
856859	2011 WH_{169}	—	November 18, 2011	Mount Lemmon	Mount Lemmon Survey	·	800 m	MPC · JPL
856860	2011 WK_{169}	—	November 18, 2011	Mount Lemmon	Mount Lemmon Survey	TIN	1 km	MPC · JPL
856861	2011 WN_{169}	—	January 4, 2016	Haleakala	Pan-STARRS 1	·	620 m	MPC · JPL
856862	2011 WQ_{170}	—	November 18, 2011	Mount Lemmon	Mount Lemmon Survey	EUN	710 m	MPC · JPL
856863	2011 WA_{172}	—	July 28, 2014	Haleakala	Pan-STARRS 1	·	930 m	MPC · JPL
856864	2011 WO_{173}	—	September 11, 2015	Haleakala	Pan-STARRS 1	·	1.0 km	MPC · JPL
856865	2011 WQ_{175}	—	November 24, 2011	Mount Lemmon	Mount Lemmon Survey	·	1.3 km	MPC · JPL
856866	2011 WA_{177}	—	November 25, 2011	Haleakala	Pan-STARRS 1	·	1.3 km	MPC · JPL
856867	2011 WE_{177}	—	November 17, 2011	Mount Lemmon	Mount Lemmon Survey	·	1.5 km	MPC · JPL
856868	2011 WV_{179}	—	November 26, 2011	Mount Lemmon	Mount Lemmon Survey	·	1.3 km	MPC · JPL
856869	2011 WB_{181}	—	November 18, 2011	Mount Lemmon	Mount Lemmon Survey	·	1.5 km	MPC · JPL
856870	2011 WU_{183}	—	November 27, 2011	Kitt Peak	Spacewatch	·	530 m	MPC · JPL
856871	2011 WF_{186}	—	November 18, 2011	Mount Lemmon	Mount Lemmon Survey	·	1.2 km	MPC · JPL
856872	2011 WU_{188}	—	November 28, 2011	Mount Lemmon	Mount Lemmon Survey	·	2.0 km	MPC · JPL
856873	2011 XC_{1}	—	December 1, 2011	Haleakala	Pan-STARRS 1	H	310 m	MPC · JPL
856874	2011 XO_{4}	—	December 6, 2011	Haleakala	Pan-STARRS 1	TIR	2.2 km	MPC · JPL
856875	2011 XB_{5}	—	December 6, 2011	Haleakala	Pan-STARRS 1	·	470 m	MPC · JPL
856876	2011 XE_{5}	—	December 6, 2011	Haleakala	Pan-STARRS 1	·	890 m	MPC · JPL
856877	2011 XU_{5}	—	May 6, 2014	Haleakala	Pan-STARRS 1	TIN	770 m	MPC · JPL
856878	2011 XM_{6}	—	October 20, 2011	Mount Lemmon	Mount Lemmon Survey	·	530 m	MPC · JPL
856879	2011 XQ_{6}	—	December 1, 2011	Haleakala	Pan-STARRS 1	·	1.1 km	MPC · JPL
856880	2011 XC_{7}	—	December 1, 2011	Haleakala	Pan-STARRS 1	KOR	1.0 km	MPC · JPL
856881	2011 YN	—	December 16, 2011	Mount Lemmon	Mount Lemmon Survey	H	280 m	MPC · JPL
856882	2011 YY	—	December 16, 2011	Mount Lemmon	Mount Lemmon Survey	·	2.6 km	MPC · JPL
856883	2011 YN_{1}	—	October 27, 2011	Nizhny Arkhyz	A. Novichonok, V. Gerke	·	700 m	MPC · JPL
856884	2011 YO_{5}	—	October 9, 2007	Mount Lemmon	Mount Lemmon Survey	·	650 m	MPC · JPL
856885	2011 YX_{12}	—	December 1, 2011	Haleakala	Pan-STARRS 1	T_{j} (2.99) · EUP	2.7 km	MPC · JPL
856886	2011 YL_{13}	—	November 27, 2011	Mount Lemmon	Mount Lemmon Survey	·	2.3 km	MPC · JPL
856887	2011 YR_{18}	—	December 28, 2011	Mount Lemmon	Mount Lemmon Survey	·	470 m	MPC · JPL
856888	2011 YV_{18}	—	December 26, 2011	Mount Lemmon	Mount Lemmon Survey	L4	5.8 km	MPC · JPL
856889	2011 YC_{19}	—	November 28, 2011	Haleakala	Pan-STARRS 1	EUP	2.8 km	MPC · JPL
856890	2011 YA_{24}	—	October 11, 2007	Kitt Peak	Spacewatch	·	740 m	MPC · JPL
856891	2011 YG_{25}	—	December 25, 2011	Kitt Peak	Spacewatch	NYS	670 m	MPC · JPL
856892	2011 YO_{39}	—	December 28, 2011	Mount Lemmon	Mount Lemmon Survey	H	380 m	MPC · JPL
856893	2011 YP_{47}	—	November 23, 2011	Catalina	CSS	·	1.3 km	MPC · JPL
856894	2011 YS_{47}	—	December 28, 2011	Mount Lemmon	Mount Lemmon Survey	·	1.6 km	MPC · JPL
856895	2011 YY_{47}	—	December 24, 2011	Mount Lemmon	Mount Lemmon Survey	H	410 m	MPC · JPL
856896	2011 YA_{49}	—	December 24, 2011	Mount Lemmon	Mount Lemmon Survey	·	870 m	MPC · JPL
856897	2011 YY_{50}	—	December 30, 2011	Mount Lemmon	Mount Lemmon Survey	·	1.6 km	MPC · JPL
856898	2011 YK_{51}	—	December 26, 2011	Mount Lemmon	Mount Lemmon Survey	·	1.6 km	MPC · JPL
856899	2011 YF_{52}	—	December 31, 2011	Mount Lemmon	Mount Lemmon Survey	·	970 m	MPC · JPL
856900	2011 YE_{53}	—	December 27, 2011	Kitt Peak	Spacewatch	TIR	2.1 km	MPC · JPL

== 856901–857000 ==
back to top

Designation			Discovery			Properties		Ref
Permanent	Provisional	Named after	Date	Site	Discoverer(s)	Category	Diam.	Ref
856901	2011 YR_{53}	—	October 19, 2007	Mount Lemmon	Mount Lemmon Survey	·	720 m	MPC · JPL
856902	2011 YO_{56}	—	December 29, 2011	Kitt Peak	Spacewatch	·	700 m	MPC · JPL
856903	2011 YS_{62}	—	December 29, 2011	Catalina	CSS	AMO	410 m	MPC · JPL
856904	2011 YD_{69}	—	December 25, 2011	Mount Lemmon	Mount Lemmon Survey	·	2.0 km	MPC · JPL
856905	2011 YQ_{70}	—	December 16, 2011	Mount Lemmon	Mount Lemmon Survey	H	460 m	MPC · JPL
856906	2011 YN_{72}	—	December 29, 2011	Mount Lemmon	Mount Lemmon Survey	·	2.0 km	MPC · JPL
856907	2011 YN_{74}	—	December 29, 2011	Mount Lemmon	Mount Lemmon Survey	·	820 m	MPC · JPL
856908	2011 YT_{77}	—	October 26, 2011	Haleakala	Pan-STARRS 1	·	1.4 km	MPC · JPL
856909	2011 YY_{80}	—	April 28, 2008	Mount Lemmon	Mount Lemmon Survey	·	1.5 km	MPC · JPL
856910	2011 YC_{81}	—	December 27, 2011	Kitt Peak	Spacewatch	·	730 m	MPC · JPL
856911	2011 YH_{82}	—	May 6, 2014	Haleakala	Pan-STARRS 1	PHO	770 m	MPC · JPL
856912	2011 YP_{83}	—	December 30, 2011	Kitt Peak	Spacewatch	PHO	910 m	MPC · JPL
856913	2011 YR_{84}	—	August 28, 2014	Haleakala	Pan-STARRS 1	·	1.1 km	MPC · JPL
856914	2011 YU_{84}	—	July 6, 2014	Haleakala	Pan-STARRS 1	·	980 m	MPC · JPL
856915	2011 YE_{85}	—	December 26, 2011	Mount Lemmon	Mount Lemmon Survey	·	1.2 km	MPC · JPL
856916	2011 YF_{85}	—	December 29, 2011	Mount Lemmon	Mount Lemmon Survey	·	630 m	MPC · JPL
856917	2011 YW_{85}	—	December 31, 2011	Mount Lemmon	Mount Lemmon Survey	H	390 m	MPC · JPL
856918	2011 YU_{86}	—	December 27, 2011	Kitt Peak	Spacewatch	·	1 km	MPC · JPL
856919	2011 YY_{87}	—	January 23, 2018	Mount Lemmon	Mount Lemmon Survey	·	2.2 km	MPC · JPL
856920	2011 YB_{88}	—	December 31, 2011	Mount Lemmon	Mount Lemmon Survey	·	470 m	MPC · JPL
856921	2011 YS_{91}	—	December 27, 2011	Mount Lemmon	Mount Lemmon Survey	·	820 m	MPC · JPL
856922	2011 YC_{93}	—	December 31, 2011	Mount Lemmon	Mount Lemmon Survey	·	1.4 km	MPC · JPL
856923	2011 YM_{93}	—	December 29, 2011	Mount Lemmon	Mount Lemmon Survey	·	1.5 km	MPC · JPL
856924	2011 YQ_{93}	—	December 29, 2011	Mount Lemmon	Mount Lemmon Survey	·	1.3 km	MPC · JPL
856925	2011 YX_{94}	—	December 29, 2011	Mount Lemmon	Mount Lemmon Survey	H	330 m	MPC · JPL
856926	2011 YP_{95}	—	December 29, 2011	Mount Lemmon	Mount Lemmon Survey	·	1.7 km	MPC · JPL
856927	2011 YV_{95}	—	December 30, 2011	Mount Lemmon	Mount Lemmon Survey	·	1.5 km	MPC · JPL
856928	2011 YB_{97}	—	December 25, 2011	Kitt Peak	Spacewatch	EOS	1.3 km	MPC · JPL
856929	2011 YM_{97}	—	December 29, 2011	Mount Lemmon	Mount Lemmon Survey	·	1.4 km	MPC · JPL
856930	2011 YU_{97}	—	December 27, 2011	Mount Lemmon	Mount Lemmon Survey	H	340 m	MPC · JPL
856931	2011 YB_{99}	—	December 29, 2011	Mount Lemmon	Mount Lemmon Survey	EOS	1.3 km	MPC · JPL
856932	2012 AS_{7}	—	March 16, 2007	Catalina	CSS	·	1.5 km	MPC · JPL
856933	2012 AN_{9}	—	January 2, 2012	Kitt Peak	Spacewatch	·	1.3 km	MPC · JPL
856934	2012 AL_{10}	—	January 6, 2012	Kitt Peak	Spacewatch	·	1.3 km	MPC · JPL
856935	2012 AJ_{18}	—	December 28, 2011	Mount Lemmon	Mount Lemmon Survey	·	470 m	MPC · JPL
856936	2012 AO_{20}	—	January 4, 2012	Mount Lemmon	Mount Lemmon Survey	·	2.7 km	MPC · JPL
856937	2012 AS_{27}	—	January 3, 2012	Mount Lemmon	Mount Lemmon Survey	·	900 m	MPC · JPL
856938	2012 AH_{28}	—	January 4, 2012	Mount Lemmon	Mount Lemmon Survey	·	2.5 km	MPC · JPL
856939	2012 AM_{28}	—	January 2, 2012	Kitt Peak	Spacewatch	·	1.7 km	MPC · JPL
856940	2012 AG_{30}	—	January 6, 2012	Kitt Peak	Spacewatch	H	400 m	MPC · JPL
856941	2012 AU_{30}	—	November 21, 2015	Mount Lemmon	Mount Lemmon Survey	·	880 m	MPC · JPL
856942	2012 AL_{31}	—	January 3, 2012	Mount Lemmon	Mount Lemmon Survey	·	840 m	MPC · JPL
856943	2012 AH_{32}	—	January 2, 2012	Mount Lemmon	Mount Lemmon Survey	·	740 m	MPC · JPL
856944	2012 AM_{32}	—	January 2, 2012	Mount Lemmon	Mount Lemmon Survey	·	2.0 km	MPC · JPL
856945	2012 AX_{32}	—	January 2, 2012	Mount Lemmon	Mount Lemmon Survey	·	1.5 km	MPC · JPL
856946	2012 AA_{33}	—	January 4, 2012	Mount Lemmon	Mount Lemmon Survey	·	550 m	MPC · JPL
856947	2012 AJ_{33}	—	January 2, 2012	Mount Lemmon	Mount Lemmon Survey	·	1.2 km	MPC · JPL
856948	2012 AZ_{34}	—	January 2, 2012	Kitt Peak	Spacewatch	·	530 m	MPC · JPL
856949	2012 AV_{35}	—	January 1, 2012	Mount Lemmon	Mount Lemmon Survey	·	1.5 km	MPC · JPL
856950	2012 AY_{38}	—	January 2, 2012	Mount Lemmon	Mount Lemmon Survey	·	2.2 km	MPC · JPL
856951	2012 BO_{4}	—	January 2, 2012	Kitt Peak	Spacewatch	·	990 m	MPC · JPL
856952	2012 BP_{12}	—	July 30, 2005	Palomar	NEAT	·	1.8 km	MPC · JPL
856953	2012 BN_{19}	—	January 20, 2012	Mount Lemmon	Mount Lemmon Survey	·	1.4 km	MPC · JPL
856954	2012 BU_{19}	—	December 26, 2011	Kitt Peak	Spacewatch	·	2.6 km	MPC · JPL
856955	2012 BT_{23}	—	January 20, 2012	Catalina	CSS	APO · PHA	580 m	MPC · JPL
856956	2012 BC_{24}	—	January 18, 2012	Oukaïmeden	M. Ory	·	1.8 km	MPC · JPL
856957	2012 BE_{29}	—	January 4, 2012	Mount Lemmon	Mount Lemmon Survey	·	740 m	MPC · JPL
856958	2012 BW_{31}	—	December 29, 2011	Mount Lemmon	Mount Lemmon Survey	·	1.6 km	MPC · JPL
856959	2012 BY_{35}	—	January 19, 2012	Mount Lemmon	Mount Lemmon Survey	·	2.2 km	MPC · JPL
856960	2012 BA_{39}	—	September 18, 2003	Palomar	NEAT	·	820 m	MPC · JPL
856961	2012 BO_{39}	—	January 19, 2012	Mount Lemmon	Mount Lemmon Survey	·	420 m	MPC · JPL
856962	2012 BT_{39}	—	January 19, 2012	Mount Lemmon	Mount Lemmon Survey	·	930 m	MPC · JPL
856963	2012 BY_{40}	—	April 20, 2009	Mount Lemmon	Mount Lemmon Survey	MAS	590 m	MPC · JPL
856964	2012 BD_{43}	—	December 30, 2011	Kitt Peak	Spacewatch	·	960 m	MPC · JPL
856965	2012 BJ_{46}	—	January 3, 2012	Kitt Peak	Spacewatch	·	750 m	MPC · JPL
856966	2012 BM_{46}	—	January 19, 2012	Mount Lemmon	Mount Lemmon Survey	·	1.6 km	MPC · JPL
856967	2012 BV_{46}	—	January 19, 2012	Mount Lemmon	Mount Lemmon Survey	·	1.8 km	MPC · JPL
856968	2012 BU_{48}	—	January 20, 2012	Mount Lemmon	Mount Lemmon Survey	·	790 m	MPC · JPL
856969	2012 BH_{49}	—	January 20, 2012	Mount Lemmon	Mount Lemmon Survey	·	2.2 km	MPC · JPL
856970	2012 BE_{51}	—	January 4, 2012	Mount Lemmon	Mount Lemmon Survey	·	580 m	MPC · JPL
856971	2012 BB_{53}	—	January 21, 2012	Kitt Peak	Spacewatch	·	940 m	MPC · JPL
856972	2012 BN_{60}	—	January 24, 2012	Haleakala	Pan-STARRS 1	H	400 m	MPC · JPL
856973	2012 BE_{62}	—	January 2, 2012	Kitt Peak	Spacewatch	EUN	840 m	MPC · JPL
856974	2012 BM_{63}	—	January 20, 2012	Mount Lemmon	Mount Lemmon Survey	·	870 m	MPC · JPL
856975	2012 BM_{67}	—	February 2, 2008	Mount Lemmon	Mount Lemmon Survey	(5)	870 m	MPC · JPL
856976	2012 BB_{69}	—	December 28, 2011	Les Engarouines	L. Bernasconi	·	930 m	MPC · JPL
856977	2012 BG_{72}	—	March 19, 2001	Kitt Peak	Spacewatch	·	1.0 km	MPC · JPL
856978	2012 BM_{76}	—	January 26, 2012	Mount Lemmon	Mount Lemmon Survey	·	820 m	MPC · JPL
856979	2012 BB_{77}	—	January 25, 2012	Catalina	CSS	APO	570 m	MPC · JPL
856980	2012 BW_{87}	—	January 6, 2012	Kitt Peak	Spacewatch	·	470 m	MPC · JPL
856981	2012 BW_{92}	—	November 30, 2003	Kitt Peak	Spacewatch	·	810 m	MPC · JPL
856982	2012 BY_{92}	—	January 26, 2012	Haleakala	Pan-STARRS 1	·	1.3 km	MPC · JPL
856983	2012 BX_{98}	—	January 26, 2012	Haleakala	Pan-STARRS 1	H	350 m	MPC · JPL
856984	2012 BG_{108}	—	January 26, 2012	Haleakala	Pan-STARRS 1	H	240 m	MPC · JPL
856985	2012 BM_{110}	—	January 19, 2012	Kitt Peak	Spacewatch	·	970 m	MPC · JPL
856986	2012 BQ_{114}	—	January 30, 2009	Mount Lemmon	Mount Lemmon Survey	·	780 m	MPC · JPL
856987	2012 BZ_{117}	—	November 9, 2007	Kitt Peak	Spacewatch	·	700 m	MPC · JPL
856988	2012 BB_{118}	—	January 3, 2012	Kitt Peak	Spacewatch	·	1.7 km	MPC · JPL
856989	2012 BK_{119}	—	January 27, 2012	Kitt Peak	Spacewatch	H	350 m	MPC · JPL
856990	2012 BD_{120}	—	January 20, 2012	Kitt Peak	Spacewatch	·	1.0 km	MPC · JPL
856991	2012 BM_{121}	—	January 21, 2012	Haleakala	Pan-STARRS 1	H	400 m	MPC · JPL
856992	2012 BA_{125}	—	February 13, 2007	Mount Lemmon	Mount Lemmon Survey	·	1.4 km	MPC · JPL
856993	2012 BW_{127}	—	December 26, 2011	Kitt Peak	Spacewatch	·	680 m	MPC · JPL
856994	2012 BM_{134}	—	January 21, 2012	Kitt Peak	Spacewatch	H	380 m	MPC · JPL
856995	2012 BL_{137}	—	January 19, 2012	Kitt Peak	Spacewatch	·	760 m	MPC · JPL
856996	2012 BF_{146}	—	December 30, 2011	Kitt Peak	Spacewatch	·	820 m	MPC · JPL
856997	2012 BD_{148}	—	February 7, 2008	Mount Lemmon	Mount Lemmon Survey	·	730 m	MPC · JPL
856998	2012 BS_{155}	—	January 21, 2012	Kitt Peak	Spacewatch	H	370 m	MPC · JPL
856999	2012 BP_{158}	—	January 21, 2012	Kitt Peak	Spacewatch	·	2.1 km	MPC · JPL
857000	2012 BW_{160}	—	January 21, 2012	Haleakala	Pan-STARRS 1	·	890 m	MPC · JPL

== Meaning of names ==
As minor planet discoveries are confirmed, they are given a permanent number by the IAU's Minor Planet Center (MPC), and the discoverers can then submit names for them, following the IAU's naming conventions. The list below concerns those minor planets in the specified number-range that have received names, and explains the meanings of those names.

Official naming citations of newly named small Solar System bodies are approved and published in a bulletin by IAU's Working Group for Small Bodies Nomenclature (WGSBN). Before May 2021, citations were published in MPC's Minor Planet Circulars for many decades. Recent citations can also be found on the JPL Small-Body Database (SBDB). Until his death in 2016, German astronomer Lutz D. Schmadel compiled these citations into the Dictionary of Minor Planet Names (DMP) and regularly updated the collection.

Based on Paul Herget's The Names of the Minor Planets, Schmadel also researched the unclear origin of numerous asteroids, most of which had been named prior to World War II. This article incorporates text from this source, which is in the public domain: SBDB New namings may only be added to this list below after official publication as the preannouncement of names is condemned. The WGSBN publishes a comprehensive guideline for the naming rules of non-cometary small Solar System bodies.

Named minor planet	Provisional	This minor planet was named for...	Ref · Catalog
856173 Rozenštrauhs	2011 SF_{81}	Eduards Rozenštrauhs, Latvian songwriters.	IAU · 856173
