= List of minor planets: 831001–832000 =

The following is a partial list of minor planets, running from minor-planet number 831001 through 832000, inclusive. The primary data for this and other partial lists is based on JPL's "Small-Body Orbital Elements" and data available from the Minor Planet Center. Critical list information is also provided by the MPC, unless otherwise specified from Lowell Observatory. A detailed description of the table's columns and additional sources are given on the main page including a complete list of every page in this series, and a statistical break-up on the dynamical classification of minor planets.

Also see the summary list of all named bodies in numerical and alphabetical order, and the corresponding naming citations for the number range of this particular list. New namings may only be added to this list after official publication, as the preannouncement of names is condemned by the Working Group for Small Bodies Nomenclature of the International Astronomical Union.

Near-Earth obj.	MBA (inner)	MBA (outer)	Centaur
Mars-crosser	MBA (middle)	Jupiter trojan	Trans-Neptunian obj.
Unclassified

== 831001–831100 ==
Designation			Discovery			Properties		Ref
Permanent	Provisional	Named after	Date	Site	Discoverer(s)	Category	Diam.	Ref
831001	2008 VS_{93}	—	March 13, 2014	Mount Lemmon	Mount Lemmon Survey	PHO	730 m	MPC · JPL
831002	2008 VE_{95}	—	November 6, 2008	Kitt Peak	Spacewatch	V	500 m	MPC · JPL
831003	2008 VB_{98}	—	July 11, 2016	Haleakala	Pan-STARRS 1	·	1.4 km	MPC · JPL
831004	2008 VV_{100}	—	November 7, 2008	Kitt Peak	Spacewatch	·	550 m	MPC · JPL
831005	2008 VJ_{102}	—	November 6, 2008	Mount Lemmon	Mount Lemmon Survey	·	1.6 km	MPC · JPL
831006	2008 VQ_{102}	—	November 9, 2008	Kitt Peak	Spacewatch	(5)	720 m	MPC · JPL
831007	2008 VJ_{103}	—	November 6, 2008	Mount Lemmon	Mount Lemmon Survey	·	2.6 km	MPC · JPL
831008	2008 VA_{104}	—	November 8, 2008	Kitt Peak	Spacewatch	·	1.2 km	MPC · JPL
831009	2008 VQ_{106}	—	November 6, 2008	Kitt Peak	Spacewatch	·	1.0 km	MPC · JPL
831010	2008 VE_{107}	—	November 3, 2008	Kitt Peak	Spacewatch	·	420 m	MPC · JPL
831011	2008 VG_{109}	—	November 9, 2008	Kitt Peak	Spacewatch	·	480 m	MPC · JPL
831012	2008 VL_{111}	—	November 3, 2008	Mount Lemmon	Mount Lemmon Survey	·	1.6 km	MPC · JPL
831013	2008 WW	—	November 8, 2008	Mount Lemmon	Mount Lemmon Survey	MAS	510 m	MPC · JPL
831014	2008 WZ	—	October 31, 2008	Catalina	CSS	(1547)	950 m	MPC · JPL
831015	2008 WF_{2}	—	November 7, 2008	Mount Lemmon	Mount Lemmon Survey	·	1.4 km	MPC · JPL
831016	2008 WH_{2}	—	October 31, 2008	Catalina	CSS	·	2.0 km	MPC · JPL
831017	2008 WQ_{4}	—	October 29, 2008	Kitt Peak	Spacewatch	·	1.2 km	MPC · JPL
831018	2008 WZ_{9}	—	November 7, 2008	Mount Lemmon	Mount Lemmon Survey	·	1.4 km	MPC · JPL
831019	2008 WF_{11}	—	November 1, 2008	Mount Lemmon	Mount Lemmon Survey	·	1.4 km	MPC · JPL
831020	2008 WU_{17}	—	October 28, 2008	Kitt Peak	Spacewatch	·	770 m	MPC · JPL
831021	2008 WR_{18}	—	October 28, 2008	Mount Lemmon	Mount Lemmon Survey	·	1.8 km	MPC · JPL
831022	2008 WD_{32}	—	November 19, 2008	Mount Lemmon	Mount Lemmon Survey	·	1.3 km	MPC · JPL
831023	2008 WT_{35}	—	November 17, 2008	Kitt Peak	Spacewatch	·	2.1 km	MPC · JPL
831024	2008 WY_{36}	—	November 17, 2008	Kitt Peak	Spacewatch	·	1.2 km	MPC · JPL
831025	2008 WN_{38}	—	November 7, 2008	Mount Lemmon	Mount Lemmon Survey	·	1.3 km	MPC · JPL
831026	2008 WA_{39}	—	November 17, 2008	Kitt Peak	Spacewatch	NYS	630 m	MPC · JPL
831027	2008 WG_{40}	—	November 7, 2008	Mount Lemmon	Mount Lemmon Survey	·	840 m	MPC · JPL
831028	2008 WE_{48}	—	November 17, 2008	Kitt Peak	Spacewatch	·	740 m	MPC · JPL
831029	2008 WO_{53}	—	April 10, 2005	Kitt Peak	Deep Ecliptic Survey	THM	1.5 km	MPC · JPL
831030	2008 WT_{53}	—	November 9, 2008	Mount Lemmon	Mount Lemmon Survey	H	440 m	MPC · JPL
831031	2008 WH_{57}	—	October 23, 2008	Mount Lemmon	Mount Lemmon Survey	LIX	3.0 km	MPC · JPL
831032	2008 WR_{64}	—	October 28, 2008	Kitt Peak	Spacewatch	·	2.0 km	MPC · JPL
831033	2008 WT_{64}	—	October 5, 2002	Sacramento Peak	SDSS	THM	1.9 km	MPC · JPL
831034	2008 WC_{71}	—	November 18, 2008	Kitt Peak	Spacewatch	·	1.6 km	MPC · JPL
831035	2008 WW_{78}	—	September 28, 2008	Mount Lemmon	Mount Lemmon Survey	EUP	4.4 km	MPC · JPL
831036	2008 WX_{83}	—	November 20, 2008	Kitt Peak	Spacewatch	·	2.0 km	MPC · JPL
831037	2008 WU_{90}	—	November 5, 1991	Kitt Peak	Spacewatch	·	1.0 km	MPC · JPL
831038	2008 WE_{98}	—	October 25, 2008	Kitt Peak	Spacewatch	·	1.2 km	MPC · JPL
831039	2008 WO_{100}	—	November 24, 2008	Kitt Peak	Spacewatch	H	380 m	MPC · JPL
831040	2008 WA_{107}	—	November 30, 2008	Kitt Peak	Spacewatch	TIR	2.5 km	MPC · JPL
831041	2008 WG_{110}	—	October 29, 2002	Sacramento Peak	SDSS	EOS	1.5 km	MPC · JPL
831042	2008 WP_{110}	—	November 17, 2008	Kitt Peak	Spacewatch	THM	1.6 km	MPC · JPL
831043	2008 WZ_{110}	—	November 21, 2008	Kitt Peak	Spacewatch	·	1.3 km	MPC · JPL
831044	2008 WL_{114}	—	October 30, 2008	Kitt Peak	Spacewatch	·	1.2 km	MPC · JPL
831045	2008 WK_{116}	—	November 30, 2008	Kitt Peak	Spacewatch	THM	1.6 km	MPC · JPL
831046	2008 WS_{124}	—	November 25, 2008	Cerro Burek	I. de la Cueva	·	1.5 km	MPC · JPL
831047	2008 WO_{129}	—	November 24, 2008	Mount Lemmon	Mount Lemmon Survey	PHO	660 m	MPC · JPL
831048	2008 WG_{131}	—	November 19, 2008	Kitt Peak	Spacewatch	·	1.5 km	MPC · JPL
831049	2008 WW_{133}	—	November 19, 2008	Kitt Peak	Spacewatch	TIR	2.3 km	MPC · JPL
831050	2008 WD_{147}	—	September 19, 2012	Mount Lemmon	Mount Lemmon Survey	·	1.4 km	MPC · JPL
831051	2008 WL_{147}	—	November 17, 2008	Catalina	CSS	(1547)	1.3 km	MPC · JPL
831052	2008 WX_{147}	—	November 19, 2008	Mount Lemmon	Mount Lemmon Survey	·	2.0 km	MPC · JPL
831053	2008 WT_{149}	—	April 10, 2010	Kitt Peak	Spacewatch	·	1.5 km	MPC · JPL
831054	2008 WU_{150}	—	September 10, 2013	Haleakala	Pan-STARRS 1	·	2.2 km	MPC · JPL
831055	2008 WZ_{150}	—	October 24, 2011	Haleakala	Pan-STARRS 1	·	480 m	MPC · JPL
831056	2008 WV_{151}	—	November 30, 2008	Mount Lemmon	Mount Lemmon Survey	ELF	2.8 km	MPC · JPL
831057	2008 WR_{153}	—	November 20, 2008	Kitt Peak	Spacewatch	·	1.2 km	MPC · JPL
831058	2008 WV_{155}	—	March 16, 2010	Catalina	CSS	LIX	2.6 km	MPC · JPL
831059	2008 WX_{155}	—	November 21, 2008	Mount Lemmon	Mount Lemmon Survey	·	2.2 km	MPC · JPL
831060	2008 WZ_{155}	—	November 17, 2008	Kitt Peak	Spacewatch	EMA	2.3 km	MPC · JPL
831061	2008 WT_{156}	—	November 21, 2008	Kitt Peak	Spacewatch	H	450 m	MPC · JPL
831062	2008 WN_{157}	—	November 19, 2008	Kitt Peak	Spacewatch	·	1.0 km	MPC · JPL
831063	2008 WH_{159}	—	November 21, 2008	Kitt Peak	Spacewatch	HOF	2.0 km	MPC · JPL
831064	2008 WF_{161}	—	November 19, 2008	Kitt Peak	Spacewatch	·	1.3 km	MPC · JPL
831065	2008 WV_{161}	—	November 21, 2008	Kitt Peak	Spacewatch	·	740 m	MPC · JPL
831066	2008 WY_{161}	—	November 21, 2008	Mount Lemmon	Mount Lemmon Survey	·	1.9 km	MPC · JPL
831067	2008 WC_{164}	—	November 30, 2008	Mount Lemmon	Mount Lemmon Survey	·	1.3 km	MPC · JPL
831068	2008 WW_{164}	—	November 10, 2004	Kitt Peak	Spacewatch	·	1.0 km	MPC · JPL
831069	2008 WZ_{164}	—	November 21, 2008	Mount Lemmon	Mount Lemmon Survey	·	810 m	MPC · JPL
831070	2008 WU_{167}	—	November 20, 2008	Mount Lemmon	Mount Lemmon Survey	H	380 m	MPC · JPL
831071	2008 XG_{1}	—	October 9, 2004	Kitt Peak	Spacewatch	·	760 m	MPC · JPL
831072	2008 XZ_{7}	—	October 29, 2008	Mount Lemmon	Mount Lemmon Survey	·	1.9 km	MPC · JPL
831073	2008 XC_{8}	—	November 7, 2008	Mount Lemmon	Mount Lemmon Survey	·	1.2 km	MPC · JPL
831074	2008 XZ_{8}	—	November 7, 2008	Mount Lemmon	Mount Lemmon Survey	·	1.2 km	MPC · JPL
831075	2008 XO_{9}	—	October 24, 2008	Catalina	CSS	·	1.1 km	MPC · JPL
831076	2008 XO_{17}	—	December 1, 2008	Kitt Peak	Spacewatch	·	940 m	MPC · JPL
831077	2008 XK_{24}	—	October 31, 2008	Kitt Peak	Spacewatch	·	410 m	MPC · JPL
831078	2008 XM_{25}	—	December 4, 2008	Mount Lemmon	Mount Lemmon Survey	·	930 m	MPC · JPL
831079	2008 XV_{28}	—	December 4, 2008	Mount Lemmon	Mount Lemmon Survey	·	1.9 km	MPC · JPL
831080	2008 XJ_{35}	—	March 20, 1999	Sacramento Peak	SDSS	V	630 m	MPC · JPL
831081	2008 XU_{35}	—	November 8, 2008	Kitt Peak	Spacewatch	NYS	970 m	MPC · JPL
831082	2008 XT_{37}	—	December 2, 2008	Kitt Peak	Spacewatch	·	790 m	MPC · JPL
831083	2008 XL_{57}	—	December 8, 2008	Mount Lemmon	Mount Lemmon Survey	T_{j} (2.98) · EUP	2.8 km	MPC · JPL
831084	2008 XE_{59}	—	December 5, 2008	Mount Lemmon	Mount Lemmon Survey	·	1.6 km	MPC · JPL
831085	2008 XS_{59}	—	November 23, 2008	Kitt Peak	Spacewatch	·	2.4 km	MPC · JPL
831086	2008 XH_{60}	—	December 1, 2008	Kitt Peak	Spacewatch	·	2.0 km	MPC · JPL
831087	2008 XW_{64}	—	November 21, 2014	Mount Lemmon	Mount Lemmon Survey	·	2.4 km	MPC · JPL
831088	2008 XR_{65}	—	December 2, 2008	Kitt Peak	Spacewatch	·	2.5 km	MPC · JPL
831089	2008 XM_{66}	—	December 1, 2008	Mount Lemmon	Mount Lemmon Survey	·	1.2 km	MPC · JPL
831090	2008 XA_{69}	—	December 3, 2008	Kitt Peak	Spacewatch	·	1.2 km	MPC · JPL
831091	2008 XE_{69}	—	December 1, 2008	Kitt Peak	Spacewatch	·	1.2 km	MPC · JPL
831092	2008 XF_{69}	—	December 3, 2008	Catalina	CSS	·	1.1 km	MPC · JPL
831093	2008 XK_{71}	—	December 1, 2008	Kitt Peak	Spacewatch	·	1.3 km	MPC · JPL
831094	2008 YA_{8}	—	December 22, 2008	La Sagra	OAM	EUP	3.7 km	MPC · JPL
831095	2008 YP_{13}	—	October 15, 2004	Mount Lemmon	Mount Lemmon Survey	·	700 m	MPC · JPL
831096	2008 YK_{17}	—	December 21, 2008	Mount Lemmon	Mount Lemmon Survey	PHO	810 m	MPC · JPL
831097	2008 YQ_{24}	—	December 26, 2008	Bergisch Gladbach	W. Bickel	·	1.6 km	MPC · JPL
831098	2008 YB_{26}	—	December 4, 2008	Mount Lemmon	Mount Lemmon Survey	·	1.7 km	MPC · JPL
831099	2008 YL_{26}	—	December 23, 2008	Dauban	C. Rinner, Kugel, F.	·	1.4 km	MPC · JPL
831100	2008 YV_{34}	—	December 21, 2008	Catalina	CSS	·	3.4 km	MPC · JPL

== 831101–831200 ==
back to top

Designation			Discovery			Properties		Ref
Permanent	Provisional	Named after	Date	Site	Discoverer(s)	Category	Diam.	Ref
831101	2008 YS_{36}	—	December 22, 2008	Kitt Peak	Spacewatch	V	530 m	MPC · JPL
831102	2008 YO_{39}	—	November 24, 2008	Mount Lemmon	Mount Lemmon Survey	·	1.2 km	MPC · JPL
831103	2008 YM_{44}	—	December 29, 2008	Mount Lemmon	Mount Lemmon Survey	·	1.0 km	MPC · JPL
831104	2008 YD_{50}	—	December 29, 2008	Mount Lemmon	Mount Lemmon Survey	·	1.7 km	MPC · JPL
831105	2008 YV_{51}	—	December 29, 2008	Mount Lemmon	Mount Lemmon Survey	·	560 m	MPC · JPL
831106	2008 YJ_{58}	—	December 30, 2008	Kitt Peak	Spacewatch	·	900 m	MPC · JPL
831107	2008 YR_{61}	—	February 13, 2002	Sacramento Peak	SDSS	·	720 m	MPC · JPL
831108	2008 YO_{65}	—	December 30, 2008	Kitt Peak	Spacewatch	HOF	2.0 km	MPC · JPL
831109	2008 YS_{66}	—	November 4, 2004	Kitt Peak	Spacewatch	·	1.0 km	MPC · JPL
831110	2008 YD_{68}	—	December 30, 2008	Mount Lemmon	Mount Lemmon Survey	·	850 m	MPC · JPL
831111	2008 YR_{71}	—	November 21, 2008	Kitt Peak	Spacewatch	·	520 m	MPC · JPL
831112	2008 YF_{74}	—	December 22, 2008	Kitt Peak	Spacewatch	·	1.1 km	MPC · JPL
831113	2008 YM_{75}	—	December 30, 2008	Mount Lemmon	Mount Lemmon Survey	·	1.2 km	MPC · JPL
831114	2008 YY_{81}	—	December 31, 2008	Kitt Peak	Spacewatch	V	420 m	MPC · JPL
831115	2008 YG_{86}	—	December 29, 2008	Kitt Peak	Spacewatch	·	2.0 km	MPC · JPL
831116	2008 YD_{92}	—	December 29, 2008	Kitt Peak	Spacewatch	·	1.8 km	MPC · JPL
831117	2008 YV_{96}	—	December 29, 2008	Mount Lemmon	Mount Lemmon Survey	(5)	940 m	MPC · JPL
831118	2008 YM_{104}	—	December 29, 2008	Kitt Peak	Spacewatch	·	520 m	MPC · JPL
831119	2008 YH_{116}	—	December 21, 2008	Mount Lemmon	Mount Lemmon Survey	·	1.5 km	MPC · JPL
831120	2008 YC_{117}	—	December 21, 2008	Mount Lemmon	Mount Lemmon Survey	THM	1.6 km	MPC · JPL
831121	2008 YK_{121}	—	December 30, 2008	Kitt Peak	Spacewatch	·	2.5 km	MPC · JPL
831122	2008 YW_{130}	—	December 31, 2008	Kitt Peak	Spacewatch	EUN	940 m	MPC · JPL
831123	2008 YT_{131}	—	December 21, 2008	Kitt Peak	Spacewatch	·	1.3 km	MPC · JPL
831124	2008 YY_{142}	—	December 30, 2008	Kitt Peak	Spacewatch	·	1.4 km	MPC · JPL
831125	2008 YX_{146}	—	October 26, 2008	Kitt Peak	Spacewatch	·	2.3 km	MPC · JPL
831126	2008 YY_{147}	—	December 31, 2008	Kitt Peak	Spacewatch	·	880 m	MPC · JPL
831127	2008 YN_{175}	—	February 4, 2005	Mount Lemmon	Mount Lemmon Survey	·	750 m	MPC · JPL
831128	2008 YX_{178}	—	December 22, 2008	Kitt Peak	Spacewatch	·	1.5 km	MPC · JPL
831129	2008 YA_{179}	—	November 20, 2003	Sacramento Peak	SDSS	·	1.2 km	MPC · JPL
831130	2008 YR_{179}	—	December 29, 2008	Mount Lemmon	Mount Lemmon Survey	·	3.0 km	MPC · JPL
831131	2008 YL_{180}	—	December 29, 2008	Mount Lemmon	Mount Lemmon Survey	·	1.2 km	MPC · JPL
831132	2008 YJ_{181}	—	December 21, 2008	Catalina	CSS	·	1.3 km	MPC · JPL
831133	2008 YS_{181}	—	December 21, 2008	Mount Lemmon	Mount Lemmon Survey	·	3.1 km	MPC · JPL
831134	2008 YH_{183}	—	December 31, 2008	Kitt Peak	Spacewatch	·	2.5 km	MPC · JPL
831135	2008 YV_{184}	—	December 22, 2008	Kitt Peak	Spacewatch	·	1.6 km	MPC · JPL
831136	2008 YD_{185}	—	December 22, 2008	Kitt Peak	Spacewatch	·	1.9 km	MPC · JPL
831137	2008 YN_{186}	—	November 8, 2015	Catalina	CSS	·	830 m	MPC · JPL
831138	2008 YM_{187}	—	December 31, 2008	Mount Lemmon	Mount Lemmon Survey	·	1.0 km	MPC · JPL
831139	2008 YK_{190}	—	December 29, 2008	Mount Lemmon	Mount Lemmon Survey	·	1.6 km	MPC · JPL
831140	2008 YA_{196}	—	December 29, 2008	Kitt Peak	Spacewatch	AGN	730 m	MPC · JPL
831141	2008 YS_{197}	—	December 29, 2008	Kitt Peak	Spacewatch	·	1.2 km	MPC · JPL
831142	2009 AJ_{8}	—	January 1, 2009	Kitt Peak	Spacewatch	·	630 m	MPC · JPL
831143	2009 AC_{11}	—	January 2, 2009	Mount Lemmon	Mount Lemmon Survey	·	850 m	MPC · JPL
831144	2009 AG_{31}	—	December 7, 2008	Mount Lemmon	Mount Lemmon Survey	·	2.5 km	MPC · JPL
831145	2009 AD_{38}	—	January 15, 2009	Kitt Peak	Spacewatch	·	1.4 km	MPC · JPL
831146	2009 AC_{39}	—	December 31, 2008	Kitt Peak	Spacewatch	·	2.3 km	MPC · JPL
831147	2009 AK_{43}	—	December 5, 2008	Mount Lemmon	Mount Lemmon Survey	·	1.5 km	MPC · JPL
831148	2009 AP_{44}	—	January 15, 2009	Kitt Peak	Spacewatch	DOR	1.5 km	MPC · JPL
831149	2009 AS_{55}	—	January 2, 2009	Kitt Peak	Spacewatch	·	890 m	MPC · JPL
831150	2009 AW_{55}	—	August 26, 2001	Anderson Mesa	LONEOS	·	3.3 km	MPC · JPL
831151	2009 AH_{56}	—	October 15, 2017	Mount Lemmon	Mount Lemmon Survey	·	500 m	MPC · JPL
831152	2009 AM_{56}	—	December 21, 2014	Haleakala	Pan-STARRS 1	·	2.3 km	MPC · JPL
831153	2009 AJ_{57}	—	October 27, 2011	Mount Lemmon	Mount Lemmon Survey	·	460 m	MPC · JPL
831154	2009 AW_{58}	—	January 5, 2017	Mount Lemmon	Mount Lemmon Survey	·	1.1 km	MPC · JPL
831155	2009 AV_{61}	—	January 1, 2009	Kitt Peak	Spacewatch	·	1.6 km	MPC · JPL
831156	2009 AU_{62}	—	January 1, 2009	Mount Lemmon	Mount Lemmon Survey	·	2.4 km	MPC · JPL
831157	2009 BU_{2}	—	January 20, 2009	Kitt Peak	Spacewatch	·	1.0 km	MPC · JPL
831158	2009 BD_{5}	—	January 17, 2009	Dauban	C. Rinner, Kugel, F.	·	710 m	MPC · JPL
831159	2009 BM_{14}	—	January 29, 2009	Kitt Peak	Spacewatch	·	960 m	MPC · JPL
831160	2009 BB_{16}	—	January 3, 2009	Mount Lemmon	Mount Lemmon Survey	H	340 m	MPC · JPL
831161	2009 BL_{20}	—	December 30, 2008	Kitt Peak	Spacewatch	·	2.5 km	MPC · JPL
831162	2009 BU_{20}	—	January 16, 2009	Mount Lemmon	Mount Lemmon Survey	·	860 m	MPC · JPL
831163	2009 BO_{21}	—	January 16, 2009	Mount Lemmon	Mount Lemmon Survey	·	1.5 km	MPC · JPL
831164	2009 BT_{21}	—	January 17, 2009	Kitt Peak	Spacewatch	BRG	1.1 km	MPC · JPL
831165	2009 BD_{23}	—	May 8, 2005	Kitt Peak	Spacewatch	DOR	2.0 km	MPC · JPL
831166	2009 BF_{24}	—	January 17, 2009	Kitt Peak	Spacewatch	·	670 m	MPC · JPL
831167	2009 BT_{29}	—	December 29, 2008	Mount Lemmon	Mount Lemmon Survey	·	560 m	MPC · JPL
831168	2009 BN_{30}	—	December 22, 2008	Kitt Peak	Spacewatch	·	1.3 km	MPC · JPL
831169	2009 BU_{33}	—	January 16, 2009	Kitt Peak	Spacewatch	·	500 m	MPC · JPL
831170	2009 BO_{34}	—	January 16, 2009	Kitt Peak	Spacewatch	·	1.3 km	MPC · JPL
831171	2009 BV_{58}	—	January 16, 2009	Mount Lemmon	Mount Lemmon Survey	EUN	890 m	MPC · JPL
831172	2009 BN_{65}	—	February 14, 2005	Kitt Peak	Spacewatch	·	770 m	MPC · JPL
831173	2009 BG_{68}	—	January 17, 2009	Mount Lemmon	Mount Lemmon Survey	DOR	1.7 km	MPC · JPL
831174	2009 BT_{76}	—	January 18, 2009	Kitt Peak	Spacewatch	·	1.6 km	MPC · JPL
831175	2009 BF_{94}	—	January 25, 2009	Kitt Peak	Spacewatch	·	510 m	MPC · JPL
831176	2009 BX_{94}	—	January 25, 2009	Kitt Peak	Spacewatch	·	1.3 km	MPC · JPL
831177	2009 BB_{105}	—	January 25, 2009	Kitt Peak	Spacewatch	LIX	2.5 km	MPC · JPL
831178	2009 BQ_{115}	—	January 29, 2009	Kitt Peak	Spacewatch	·	1.5 km	MPC · JPL
831179	2009 BR_{118}	—	December 21, 2008	Mount Lemmon	Mount Lemmon Survey	·	3.3 km	MPC · JPL
831180	2009 BW_{118}	—	January 16, 2009	Mount Lemmon	Mount Lemmon Survey	·	1.4 km	MPC · JPL
831181	2009 BN_{124}	—	January 31, 2009	Kitt Peak	Spacewatch	·	2.1 km	MPC · JPL
831182	2009 BW_{126}	—	January 29, 2009	Kitt Peak	Spacewatch	·	850 m	MPC · JPL
831183	2009 BR_{137}	—	January 29, 2009	Kitt Peak	Spacewatch	V	480 m	MPC · JPL
831184	2009 BF_{153}	—	January 31, 2009	Kitt Peak	Spacewatch	·	1.2 km	MPC · JPL
831185	2009 BR_{153}	—	January 16, 2009	Kitt Peak	Spacewatch	·	2.1 km	MPC · JPL
831186	2009 BD_{157}	—	January 25, 2009	Kitt Peak	Spacewatch	·	830 m	MPC · JPL
831187	2009 BH_{165}	—	January 31, 2009	Kitt Peak	Spacewatch	CLA	1.1 km	MPC · JPL
831188	2009 BR_{168}	—	February 1, 2009	Mount Lemmon	Mount Lemmon Survey	ADE	1.5 km	MPC · JPL
831189	2009 BH_{169}	—	February 1, 2009	Mount Lemmon	Mount Lemmon Survey	T_{j} (2.98) · 3:2	4.6 km	MPC · JPL
831190	2009 BU_{176}	—	January 16, 2009	Kitt Peak	Spacewatch	EUN	1.0 km	MPC · JPL
831191	2009 BY_{184}	—	January 20, 2009	Socorro	LINEAR	·	1.4 km	MPC · JPL
831192	2009 BB_{193}	—	January 20, 2009	Kitt Peak	Spacewatch	·	1.5 km	MPC · JPL
831193	2009 BJ_{195}	—	January 17, 2009	Mount Lemmon	Mount Lemmon Survey	JUN	900 m	MPC · JPL
831194	2009 BO_{195}	—	October 27, 2011	Catalina	CSS	·	720 m	MPC · JPL
831195	2009 BJ_{198}	—	January 31, 2009	Mount Lemmon	Mount Lemmon Survey	·	1.3 km	MPC · JPL
831196	2009 BL_{198}	—	February 16, 2010	WISE	WISE	·	2.7 km	MPC · JPL
831197	2009 BK_{199}	—	July 25, 2015	Haleakala	Pan-STARRS 1	NYS	820 m	MPC · JPL
831198	2009 BF_{201}	—	January 9, 2014	Kitt Peak	Spacewatch	·	1.5 km	MPC · JPL
831199	2009 BV_{201}	—	January 25, 2009	Kitt Peak	Spacewatch	·	590 m	MPC · JPL
831200	2009 BA_{202}	—	October 2, 2015	Haleakala	Pan-STARRS 1	HNS	860 m	MPC · JPL

== 831201–831300 ==
back to top

Designation			Discovery			Properties		Ref
Permanent	Provisional	Named after	Date	Site	Discoverer(s)	Category	Diam.	Ref
831201	2009 BF_{203}	—	February 13, 2010	WISE	WISE	·	2.2 km	MPC · JPL
831202	2009 BH_{203}	—	March 4, 2016	Haleakala	Pan-STARRS 1	·	490 m	MPC · JPL
831203	2009 BW_{203}	—	June 1, 2010	WISE	WISE	·	3.1 km	MPC · JPL
831204	2009 BG_{212}	—	January 16, 2009	Mount Lemmon	Mount Lemmon Survey	·	910 m	MPC · JPL
831205	2009 BX_{212}	—	January 29, 2009	Kitt Peak	Spacewatch	·	1.3 km	MPC · JPL
831206	2009 BF_{213}	—	January 29, 2009	Kitt Peak	Spacewatch	KON	1.8 km	MPC · JPL
831207	2009 BM_{215}	—	January 31, 2009	Mount Lemmon	Mount Lemmon Survey	DOR	1.7 km	MPC · JPL
831208	2009 BP_{216}	—	January 20, 2009	Kitt Peak	Spacewatch	·	2.3 km	MPC · JPL
831209	2009 CZ_{8}	—	January 29, 2009	Kitt Peak	Spacewatch	·	2.5 km	MPC · JPL
831210	2009 CQ_{10}	—	February 1, 2009	Mount Lemmon	Mount Lemmon Survey	·	2.7 km	MPC · JPL
831211	2009 CK_{11}	—	February 1, 2009	Mount Lemmon	Mount Lemmon Survey	·	1.2 km	MPC · JPL
831212	2009 CJ_{16}	—	February 1, 2009	Mount Lemmon	Mount Lemmon Survey	·	930 m	MPC · JPL
831213	2009 CZ_{21}	—	February 1, 2009	Kitt Peak	Spacewatch	·	1.4 km	MPC · JPL
831214	2009 CA_{24}	—	February 1, 2009	Kitt Peak	Spacewatch	·	1.0 km	MPC · JPL
831215	2009 CU_{30}	—	September 12, 2002	Palomar	NEAT	GEF	990 m	MPC · JPL
831216	2009 CU_{46}	—	December 21, 2008	Kitt Peak	Spacewatch	·	2.0 km	MPC · JPL
831217	2009 CT_{68}	—	February 13, 2010	WISE	WISE	·	3.7 km	MPC · JPL
831218	2009 CO_{69}	—	February 14, 2009	Mount Lemmon	Mount Lemmon Survey	NYS	980 m	MPC · JPL
831219	2009 CQ_{70}	—	August 5, 2010	WISE	WISE	·	2.5 km	MPC · JPL
831220	2009 CD_{79}	—	February 3, 2009	Mount Lemmon	Mount Lemmon Survey	·	1.3 km	MPC · JPL
831221	2009 DK_{10}	—	February 4, 2009	Mount Lemmon	Mount Lemmon Survey	·	890 m	MPC · JPL
831222	2009 DM_{19}	—	February 20, 2009	Kitt Peak	Spacewatch	H	370 m	MPC · JPL
831223	2009 DS_{45}	—	February 4, 2009	Kitt Peak	Spacewatch	·	930 m	MPC · JPL
831224	2009 DT_{49}	—	February 19, 2009	Kitt Peak	Spacewatch	·	1.4 km	MPC · JPL
831225	2009 DZ_{49}	—	February 19, 2009	Kitt Peak	Spacewatch	·	740 m	MPC · JPL
831226	2009 DR_{79}	—	February 21, 2009	Kitt Peak	Spacewatch	3:2 · SHU	3.6 km	MPC · JPL
831227	2009 DW_{80}	—	February 22, 2009	Kitt Peak	Spacewatch	·	1.4 km	MPC · JPL
831228	2009 DU_{94}	—	February 28, 2009	Kitt Peak	Spacewatch	·	950 m	MPC · JPL
831229	2009 DT_{114}	—	February 22, 2009	Mount Lemmon	Mount Lemmon Survey	·	1.0 km	MPC · JPL
831230	2009 DU_{114}	—	January 16, 2009	Mount Lemmon	Mount Lemmon Survey	·	1.2 km	MPC · JPL
831231	2009 DA_{128}	—	February 21, 2009	Kitt Peak	Spacewatch	·	930 m	MPC · JPL
831232	2009 DW_{130}	—	February 28, 2009	Kitt Peak	Spacewatch	H	460 m	MPC · JPL
831233	2009 DD_{134}	—	February 20, 2009	Kitt Peak	Spacewatch	·	740 m	MPC · JPL
831234	2009 DU_{150}	—	July 30, 2010	WISE	WISE	·	1.1 km	MPC · JPL
831235	2009 DZ_{150}	—	February 9, 2013	Haleakala	Pan-STARRS 1	·	1.2 km	MPC · JPL
831236	2009 DG_{151}	—	September 29, 2011	Kitt Peak	Spacewatch	MAS	450 m	MPC · JPL
831237	2009 DT_{152}	—	October 17, 2012	Mount Lemmon	Mount Lemmon Survey	·	2.2 km	MPC · JPL
831238	2009 DL_{153}	—	February 21, 2009	Kitt Peak	Spacewatch	·	770 m	MPC · JPL
831239	2009 DF_{156}	—	February 19, 2009	Kitt Peak	Spacewatch	·	870 m	MPC · JPL
831240	2009 DJ_{161}	—	February 19, 2009	Kitt Peak	Spacewatch	·	1.3 km	MPC · JPL
831241	2009 DS_{162}	—	April 26, 2010	WISE	WISE	·	1.7 km	MPC · JPL
831242	2009 DY_{163}	—	August 14, 2017	Haleakala	Pan-STARRS 1	·	1.8 km	MPC · JPL
831243	2009 ET_{24}	—	March 2, 2009	Mount Lemmon	Mount Lemmon Survey	·	3.2 km	MPC · JPL
831244	2009 EO_{32}	—	March 1, 2009	Mount Lemmon	Mount Lemmon Survey	·	840 m	MPC · JPL
831245	2009 ES_{34}	—	April 2, 2010	WISE	WISE	(895)	3.6 km	MPC · JPL
831246	2009 EX_{37}	—	October 2, 2016	Mount Lemmon	Mount Lemmon Survey	·	1.6 km	MPC · JPL
831247	2009 EC_{38}	—	January 1, 2014	Haleakala	Pan-STARRS 1	·	2.6 km	MPC · JPL
831248	2009 EK_{42}	—	March 2, 2009	Kitt Peak	Spacewatch	HNS	780 m	MPC · JPL
831249	2009 FV_{5}	—	March 16, 2009	Catalina	CSS	PHO	590 m	MPC · JPL
831250	2009 FW_{9}	—	February 20, 2009	Kitt Peak	Spacewatch	THB	1.8 km	MPC · JPL
831251	2009 FW_{13}	—	March 3, 2009	Kitt Peak	Spacewatch	·	750 m	MPC · JPL
831252	2009 FC_{34}	—	February 5, 2009	Kitt Peak	Spacewatch	·	1.7 km	MPC · JPL
831253	2009 FD_{53}	—	March 29, 2009	Mount Lemmon	Mount Lemmon Survey	·	870 m	MPC · JPL
831254	2009 FF_{64}	—	November 4, 2007	Kitt Peak	Spacewatch	·	1.1 km	MPC · JPL
831255	2009 FM_{69}	—	March 17, 2009	Kitt Peak	Spacewatch	·	1.8 km	MPC · JPL
831256	2009 FL_{85}	—	December 22, 2012	Haleakala	Pan-STARRS 1	615	1.0 km	MPC · JPL
831257	2009 FF_{86}	—	March 31, 2009	Mount Lemmon	Mount Lemmon Survey	·	1.2 km	MPC · JPL
831258	2009 FJ_{86}	—	March 19, 2009	Kitt Peak	Spacewatch	·	1.3 km	MPC · JPL
831259	2009 FQ_{87}	—	March 28, 2009	Catalina	CSS	·	2.8 km	MPC · JPL
831260	2009 FX_{87}	—	June 19, 2010	WISE	WISE	·	1.6 km	MPC · JPL
831261	2009 FA_{88}	—	March 29, 2009	Kitt Peak	Spacewatch	·	1.2 km	MPC · JPL
831262	2009 FS_{88}	—	March 24, 2014	Haleakala	Pan-STARRS 1	·	1.7 km	MPC · JPL
831263	2009 FD_{90}	—	March 19, 2009	Kitt Peak	Spacewatch	·	870 m	MPC · JPL
831264	2009 FP_{91}	—	March 19, 2009	Mount Lemmon	Mount Lemmon Survey	·	1.9 km	MPC · JPL
831265	2009 FD_{97}	—	March 31, 2009	Kitt Peak	Spacewatch	DOR	1.9 km	MPC · JPL
831266	2009 GM	—	April 1, 2009	Cerro Burek	I. de la Cueva	·	1.3 km	MPC · JPL
831267	2009 GS_{6}	—	April 2, 2009	Kitt Peak	Spacewatch	GAL	1.2 km	MPC · JPL
831268	2009 GM_{7}	—	April 2, 2009	Kitt Peak	Spacewatch	·	1.1 km	MPC · JPL
831269	2009 GR_{9}	—	April 1, 2009	Kitt Peak	Spacewatch	ADE	1.6 km	MPC · JPL
831270	2009 GG_{10}	—	April 2, 2009	Kitt Peak	Spacewatch	THB	2.5 km	MPC · JPL
831271	2009 HX_{7}	—	April 17, 2009	Kitt Peak	Spacewatch	·	1.3 km	MPC · JPL
831272	2009 HS_{30}	—	April 19, 2009	Kitt Peak	Spacewatch	·	2.3 km	MPC · JPL
831273	2009 HU_{32}	—	April 19, 2009	Kitt Peak	Spacewatch	·	2.3 km	MPC · JPL
831274	2009 HC_{33}	—	March 16, 2009	Kitt Peak	Spacewatch	·	1.3 km	MPC · JPL
831275	2009 HQ_{49}	—	April 21, 2009	Kitt Peak	Spacewatch	·	2.6 km	MPC · JPL
831276	2009 HR_{53}	—	April 20, 2009	Kitt Peak	Spacewatch	ADE	1.5 km	MPC · JPL
831277	2009 HN_{54}	—	March 31, 2009	Mount Lemmon	Mount Lemmon Survey	·	760 m	MPC · JPL
831278	2009 HF_{55}	—	April 21, 2009	Mount Lemmon	Mount Lemmon Survey	EOS	1.5 km	MPC · JPL
831279	2009 HU_{57}	—	April 21, 2009	Kitt Peak	Spacewatch	T_{j} (2.9)	2.8 km	MPC · JPL
831280	2009 HT_{64}	—	April 23, 2009	Kitt Peak	Spacewatch	·	830 m	MPC · JPL
831281	2009 HN_{70}	—	August 28, 2006	Anderson Mesa	LONEOS	·	590 m	MPC · JPL
831282	2009 HZ_{79}	—	April 27, 2009	Kitt Peak	Spacewatch	·	1.7 km	MPC · JPL
831283	2009 HX_{86}	—	April 30, 2009	Mount Lemmon	Mount Lemmon Survey	NYS	890 m	MPC · JPL
831284	2009 HK_{90}	—	March 18, 2009	Kitt Peak	Spacewatch	·	3.3 km	MPC · JPL
831285	2009 HD_{93}	—	April 30, 2009	Kitt Peak	Spacewatch	·	1.1 km	MPC · JPL
831286	2009 HO_{112}	—	March 18, 2009	Kitt Peak	Spacewatch	·	3.0 km	MPC · JPL
831287	2009 HA_{113}	—	April 28, 2009	Catalina	CSS	·	1.8 km	MPC · JPL
831288	2009 HQ_{116}	—	April 18, 2009	Mount Lemmon	Mount Lemmon Survey	·	1.2 km	MPC · JPL
831289	2009 HR_{116}	—	April 20, 2009	Mount Lemmon	Mount Lemmon Survey	·	1.5 km	MPC · JPL
831290	2009 HV_{116}	—	May 10, 2010	WISE	WISE	·	1.1 km	MPC · JPL
831291	2009 HX_{116}	—	August 16, 2014	Haleakala	Pan-STARRS 1	·	1.2 km	MPC · JPL
831292	2009 HN_{117}	—	April 30, 2016	Haleakala	Pan-STARRS 1	·	490 m	MPC · JPL
831293	2009 HX_{117}	—	March 2, 2009	Mount Lemmon	Mount Lemmon Survey	·	750 m	MPC · JPL
831294	2009 HW_{118}	—	April 20, 2009	Mount Lemmon	Mount Lemmon Survey	·	440 m	MPC · JPL
831295	2009 HR_{120}	—	October 13, 2015	Mount Lemmon	Mount Lemmon Survey	NEM	1.7 km	MPC · JPL
831296	2009 HN_{122}	—	April 29, 2009	Kitt Peak	Spacewatch	·	1.1 km	MPC · JPL
831297	2009 HW_{123}	—	April 20, 2009	Kitt Peak	Spacewatch	GEF	880 m	MPC · JPL
831298	2009 HJ_{125}	—	April 22, 2009	Mount Lemmon	Mount Lemmon Survey	·	960 m	MPC · JPL
831299	2009 HE_{127}	—	April 24, 2009	Kitt Peak	Spacewatch	·	1.2 km	MPC · JPL
831300	2009 JU_{11}	—	April 17, 2009	Mount Lemmon	Mount Lemmon Survey	·	1.3 km	MPC · JPL

== 831301–831400 ==
back to top

Designation			Discovery			Properties		Ref
Permanent	Provisional	Named after	Date	Site	Discoverer(s)	Category	Diam.	Ref
831301	2009 JX_{17}	—	May 22, 2010	WISE	WISE	·	2.3 km	MPC · JPL
831302	2009 JZ_{18}	—	April 2, 2005	Sacramento Peak	SDSS	plutino	138 km	MPC · JPL
831303	2009 JH_{21}	—	May 14, 2009	Kitt Peak	Spacewatch	·	1.5 km	MPC · JPL
831304	2009 JA_{22}	—	May 14, 2009	Kitt Peak	Spacewatch	LIX	2.5 km	MPC · JPL
831305	2009 KZ	—	March 31, 2009	Mount Lemmon	Mount Lemmon Survey	·	990 m	MPC · JPL
831306	2009 KH_{21}	—	May 14, 2009	Kitt Peak	Spacewatch	·	780 m	MPC · JPL
831307	2009 KX_{26}	—	May 29, 2009	Siding Spring	SSS	EUP	3.8 km	MPC · JPL
831308	2009 KR_{30}	—	May 17, 2009	Kitt Peak	Spacewatch	·	1.3 km	MPC · JPL
831309	2009 KJ_{38}	—	May 27, 2009	Mount Lemmon	Mount Lemmon Survey	·	1.4 km	MPC · JPL
831310	2009 KV_{39}	—	July 1, 2013	Haleakala	Pan-STARRS 1	·	950 m	MPC · JPL
831311	2009 KP_{40}	—	September 1, 2013	Mount Lemmon	Mount Lemmon Survey	·	560 m	MPC · JPL
831312	2009 KS_{40}	—	February 27, 2012	Haleakala	Pan-STARRS 1	·	500 m	MPC · JPL
831313	2009 KV_{40}	—	May 18, 2009	Mount Lemmon	Mount Lemmon Survey	·	1.1 km	MPC · JPL
831314	2009 KO_{41}	—	May 26, 2009	Kitt Peak	Spacewatch	·	440 m	MPC · JPL
831315	2009 LL	—	June 1, 2009	Cerro Burek	I. de la Cueva	·	3.6 km	MPC · JPL
831316	2009 LH_{4}	—	May 26, 2009	Mount Lemmon	Mount Lemmon Survey	·	2.8 km	MPC · JPL
831317	2009 LA_{8}	—	June 15, 2009	Mount Lemmon	Mount Lemmon Survey	·	850 m	MPC · JPL
831318	2009 MU_{2}	—	June 17, 2009	Kitt Peak	Spacewatch	·	490 m	MPC · JPL
831319	2009 ME_{6}	—	March 13, 2008	Mount Lemmon	Mount Lemmon Survey	·	3.1 km	MPC · JPL
831320	2009 MO_{6}	—	June 22, 2009	Mount Lemmon	Mount Lemmon Survey	·	1.8 km	MPC · JPL
831321	2009 MW_{6}	—	June 24, 2009	La Sagra	OAM	·	2.2 km	MPC · JPL
831322	2009 MB_{7}	—	May 30, 2009	Mount Lemmon	Mount Lemmon Survey	EUP	2.5 km	MPC · JPL
831323	2009 ME_{10}	—	June 27, 2009	Cerro Tololo	S. S. Sheppard, C. A. Trujillo	centaur	125 km	MPC · JPL
831324	2009 MO_{11}	—	June 16, 2009	Kitt Peak	Spacewatch	·	580 m	MPC · JPL
831325	2009 NH	—	July 11, 2009	Kitt Peak	Spacewatch	AMO	640 m	MPC · JPL
831326	2009 OJ_{15}	—	January 14, 2002	Palomar	NEAT	BAR	1.1 km	MPC · JPL
831327	2009 OZ_{20}	—	July 25, 2009	La Sagra	OAM	·	2.7 km	MPC · JPL
831328	2009 OR_{21}	—	July 30, 2009	Bergisch Gladbach	W. Bickel	·	1.3 km	MPC · JPL
831329	2009 ON_{26}	—	July 27, 2009	Kitt Peak	Spacewatch	H	380 m	MPC · JPL
831330	2009 OM_{28}	—	July 27, 2009	Kitt Peak	Spacewatch	·	710 m	MPC · JPL
831331	2009 OT_{28}	—	July 30, 2009	Kitt Peak	Spacewatch	·	1.6 km	MPC · JPL
831332	2009 OA_{29}	—	July 27, 2009	Kitt Peak	Spacewatch	·	1.9 km	MPC · JPL
831333	2009 OS_{29}	—	July 27, 2009	Kitt Peak	Spacewatch	·	790 m	MPC · JPL
831334	2009 OJ_{30}	—	July 29, 2009	Kitt Peak	Spacewatch	·	1.0 km	MPC · JPL
831335	2009 PT_{19}	—	August 18, 2009	Kitt Peak	Spacewatch	·	1.7 km	MPC · JPL
831336	2009 PV_{23}	—	August 15, 2009	Kitt Peak	Spacewatch	·	830 m	MPC · JPL
831337	2009 PE_{24}	—	August 15, 2009	Kitt Peak	Spacewatch	EOS	1.4 km	MPC · JPL
831338	2009 PJ_{24}	—	August 15, 2009	Kitt Peak	Spacewatch	·	1.5 km	MPC · JPL
831339	2009 PN_{24}	—	August 15, 2009	Kitt Peak	Spacewatch	·	1.2 km	MPC · JPL
831340	2009 QK_{2}	—	August 18, 2009	Catalina	CSS	T_{j} (2.85) · AMO +1km	910 m	MPC · JPL
831341	2009 QS_{37}	—	August 27, 2009	Bergisch Gladbach	W. Bickel	·	440 m	MPC · JPL
831342	2009 QP_{43}	—	August 15, 2009	Kitt Peak	Spacewatch	·	700 m	MPC · JPL
831343	2009 QC_{49}	—	August 28, 2009	Kitt Peak	Spacewatch	·	1.6 km	MPC · JPL
831344	2009 QA_{50}	—	August 28, 2009	Kitt Peak	Spacewatch	·	2.1 km	MPC · JPL
831345	2009 QY_{51}	—	January 22, 1998	Kitt Peak	Spacewatch	·	1.6 km	MPC · JPL
831346	2009 QP_{55}	—	August 18, 2009	Kitt Peak	Spacewatch	T_{j} (2.97) · 3:2	4.1 km	MPC · JPL
831347	2009 QR_{55}	—	August 27, 2009	Kitt Peak	Spacewatch	·	1.8 km	MPC · JPL
831348	2009 QW_{56}	—	August 16, 2009	Kitt Peak	Spacewatch	(8737)	2.4 km	MPC · JPL
831349	2009 QO_{60}	—	August 17, 2009	Catalina	CSS	·	2.7 km	MPC · JPL
831350	2009 QR_{67}	—	August 28, 2009	La Sagra	OAM	·	630 m	MPC · JPL
831351	2009 QD_{68}	—	August 17, 2009	Kitt Peak	Spacewatch	·	2.0 km	MPC · JPL
831352	2009 QA_{72}	—	August 16, 2009	Kitt Peak	Spacewatch	·	1.4 km	MPC · JPL
831353	2009 QK_{72}	—	August 18, 2009	Kitt Peak	Spacewatch	·	460 m	MPC · JPL
831354	2009 QJ_{73}	—	August 23, 2009	La Sagra	OAM	LIX	2.8 km	MPC · JPL
831355	2009 QS_{74}	—	August 18, 2009	Kitt Peak	Spacewatch	·	1.6 km	MPC · JPL
831356	2009 QD_{75}	—	August 27, 2009	Kitt Peak	Spacewatch	·	630 m	MPC · JPL
831357	2009 QJ_{75}	—	August 27, 2009	Kitt Peak	Spacewatch	·	1.6 km	MPC · JPL
831358	2009 QS_{75}	—	August 20, 2009	La Sagra	OAM	·	2.1 km	MPC · JPL
831359	2009 QD_{76}	—	August 27, 2009	Kitt Peak	Spacewatch	THM	1.6 km	MPC · JPL
831360	2009 QG_{76}	—	August 29, 2009	Catalina	CSS	NYS	690 m	MPC · JPL
831361	2009 QQ_{76}	—	August 18, 2009	Kitt Peak	Spacewatch	·	1.5 km	MPC · JPL
831362	2009 QA_{77}	—	August 29, 2009	Kitt Peak	Spacewatch	·	1.2 km	MPC · JPL
831363	2009 QC_{77}	—	August 20, 2009	Kitt Peak	Spacewatch	·	1.5 km	MPC · JPL
831364	2009 QY_{78}	—	August 18, 2009	Kitt Peak	Spacewatch	·	720 m	MPC · JPL
831365	2009 RZ	—	September 10, 2009	Catalina	CSS	·	1.8 km	MPC · JPL
831366	2009 RQ_{7}	—	July 30, 2009	Catalina	CSS	·	1.2 km	MPC · JPL
831367	2009 RS_{9}	—	September 12, 2009	Kitt Peak	Spacewatch	·	1.7 km	MPC · JPL
831368	2009 RC_{10}	—	September 12, 2009	Kitt Peak	Spacewatch	·	1.8 km	MPC · JPL
831369	2009 RX_{13}	—	September 12, 2009	Kitt Peak	Spacewatch	·	1.5 km	MPC · JPL
831370	2009 RN_{17}	—	September 12, 2009	Kitt Peak	Spacewatch	·	1.7 km	MPC · JPL
831371	2009 RE_{21}	—	September 15, 2009	Kitt Peak	Spacewatch	·	1.7 km	MPC · JPL
831372	2009 RF_{25}	—	September 29, 2003	Anderson Mesa	LONEOS	EUP	3.5 km	MPC · JPL
831373	2009 RF_{29}	—	September 14, 2009	Kitt Peak	Spacewatch	·	1.6 km	MPC · JPL
831374	2009 RK_{30}	—	September 14, 2009	Kitt Peak	Spacewatch	·	2.6 km	MPC · JPL
831375	2009 RW_{32}	—	September 14, 2009	Kitt Peak	Spacewatch	·	880 m	MPC · JPL
831376	2009 RR_{33}	—	September 14, 2009	Kitt Peak	Spacewatch	·	2.7 km	MPC · JPL
831377	2009 RS_{34}	—	September 14, 2009	Kitt Peak	Spacewatch	·	3.1 km	MPC · JPL
831378	2009 RF_{35}	—	September 14, 2009	Kitt Peak	Spacewatch	·	2.2 km	MPC · JPL
831379	2009 RF_{36}	—	September 15, 2009	Kitt Peak	Spacewatch	TIR	2.1 km	MPC · JPL
831380	2009 RR_{36}	—	September 15, 2009	Kitt Peak	Spacewatch	·	500 m	MPC · JPL
831381	2009 RM_{40}	—	September 15, 2009	Kitt Peak	Spacewatch	(5)	1.0 km	MPC · JPL
831382	2009 RS_{45}	—	September 15, 2009	Kitt Peak	Spacewatch	·	2.1 km	MPC · JPL
831383	2009 RX_{46}	—	September 15, 2009	Kitt Peak	Spacewatch	EUP	2.6 km	MPC · JPL
831384	2009 RU_{57}	—	September 25, 2009	Catalina	CSS	·	2.6 km	MPC · JPL
831385	2009 RA_{67}	—	September 15, 2009	Kitt Peak	Spacewatch	·	2.4 km	MPC · JPL
831386	2009 RF_{67}	—	September 15, 2009	Kitt Peak	Spacewatch	·	1.6 km	MPC · JPL
831387	2009 RT_{69}	—	September 12, 2009	Kitt Peak	Spacewatch	·	2.1 km	MPC · JPL
831388	2009 RM_{70}	—	September 12, 2009	Kitt Peak	Spacewatch	·	1.4 km	MPC · JPL
831389	2009 RX_{77}	—	September 15, 2009	Mount Lemmon	Mount Lemmon Survey	·	1.6 km	MPC · JPL
831390	2009 RA_{78}	—	September 15, 2009	Mount Lemmon	Mount Lemmon Survey	·	480 m	MPC · JPL
831391	2009 RN_{78}	—	September 15, 2009	Kitt Peak	Spacewatch	DOR	1.7 km	MPC · JPL
831392	2009 RS_{78}	—	September 15, 2009	Kitt Peak	Spacewatch	·	1.2 km	MPC · JPL
831393	2009 RD_{79}	—	September 15, 2009	Mount Lemmon	Mount Lemmon Survey	·	560 m	MPC · JPL
831394	2009 RA_{80}	—	September 12, 2009	Kitt Peak	Spacewatch	·	1.5 km	MPC · JPL
831395	2009 RK_{81}	—	September 15, 2009	Kitt Peak	Spacewatch	·	1.9 km	MPC · JPL
831396	2009 RQ_{82}	—	September 14, 2009	Kitt Peak	Spacewatch	L4	5.9 km	MPC · JPL
831397	2009 RO_{83}	—	September 15, 2009	Kitt Peak	Spacewatch	·	980 m	MPC · JPL
831398	2009 RS_{83}	—	September 15, 2009	Kitt Peak	Spacewatch	·	790 m	MPC · JPL
831399	2009 RL_{84}	—	September 12, 2009	Kitt Peak	Spacewatch	·	1.1 km	MPC · JPL
831400	2009 SO_{2}	—	August 17, 2009	Kitt Peak	Spacewatch	·	510 m	MPC · JPL

== 831401–831500 ==
back to top

Designation			Discovery			Properties		Ref
Permanent	Provisional	Named after	Date	Site	Discoverer(s)	Category	Diam.	Ref
831401	2009 SB_{4}	—	September 16, 2009	Mount Lemmon	Mount Lemmon Survey	EOS	1.6 km	MPC · JPL
831402	2009 SB_{8}	—	September 16, 2009	Mount Lemmon	Mount Lemmon Survey	·	480 m	MPC · JPL
831403	2009 SE_{9}	—	September 16, 2009	Mount Lemmon	Mount Lemmon Survey	·	2.0 km	MPC · JPL
831404	2009 SK_{9}	—	September 16, 2009	Mount Lemmon	Mount Lemmon Survey	·	1.6 km	MPC · JPL
831405	2009 SO_{23}	—	August 15, 2009	Kitt Peak	Spacewatch	·	1.9 km	MPC · JPL
831406	2009 SS_{25}	—	September 16, 2009	Kitt Peak	Spacewatch	·	610 m	MPC · JPL
831407	2009 SK_{27}	—	September 16, 2009	Kitt Peak	Spacewatch	·	1.9 km	MPC · JPL
831408	2009 SC_{31}	—	September 16, 2009	Kitt Peak	Spacewatch	·	2.2 km	MPC · JPL
831409	2009 SP_{33}	—	September 16, 2009	Kitt Peak	Spacewatch	·	2.3 km	MPC · JPL
831410	2009 SJ_{34}	—	September 16, 2009	Kitt Peak	Spacewatch	·	1.8 km	MPC · JPL
831411	2009 SH_{42}	—	September 16, 2009	Kitt Peak	Spacewatch	·	490 m	MPC · JPL
831412	2009 SZ_{44}	—	September 16, 2009	Kitt Peak	Spacewatch	·	1.6 km	MPC · JPL
831413	2009 SN_{45}	—	September 16, 2009	Kitt Peak	Spacewatch	·	1.8 km	MPC · JPL
831414	2009 SW_{46}	—	September 16, 2009	Kitt Peak	Spacewatch	·	3.3 km	MPC · JPL
831415	2009 SY_{53}	—	September 17, 2009	Mount Lemmon	Mount Lemmon Survey	·	2.0 km	MPC · JPL
831416	2009 SY_{58}	—	September 17, 2009	Kitt Peak	Spacewatch	·	2.1 km	MPC · JPL
831417	2009 SG_{65}	—	August 27, 2009	Kitt Peak	Spacewatch	·	1.5 km	MPC · JPL
831418	2009 SW_{68}	—	September 17, 2009	Kitt Peak	Spacewatch	·	520 m	MPC · JPL
831419	2009 SY_{68}	—	September 17, 2009	Kitt Peak	Spacewatch	·	2.1 km	MPC · JPL
831420	2009 SJ_{69}	—	September 17, 2009	Kitt Peak	Spacewatch	·	2.0 km	MPC · JPL
831421	2009 SO_{73}	—	September 17, 2009	Mount Lemmon	Mount Lemmon Survey	MAR	630 m	MPC · JPL
831422	2009 SX_{90}	—	September 18, 2009	Mount Lemmon	Mount Lemmon Survey	·	800 m	MPC · JPL
831423	2009 ST_{91}	—	September 18, 2009	Mount Lemmon	Mount Lemmon Survey	MAS	410 m	MPC · JPL
831424	2009 SA_{93}	—	September 19, 2009	Kitt Peak	Spacewatch	·	660 m	MPC · JPL
831425	2009 SD_{96}	—	September 19, 2009	Kitt Peak	Spacewatch	MIS	1.7 km	MPC · JPL
831426	2009 SS_{99}	—	September 23, 2009	Catalina	CSS	·	3.1 km	MPC · JPL
831427	2009 SG_{100}	—	September 20, 2009	Calvin-Rehoboth	L. A. Molnar	·	2.0 km	MPC · JPL
831428	2009 SB_{101}	—	September 23, 2009	Zelenchukskaya	T. V. Krjačko, B. Satovski	·	2.1 km	MPC · JPL
831429	2009 SH_{101}	—	September 24, 2009	Zelenchukskaya	T. V. Krjačko, B. Satovski	T_{j} (2.99) · EUP	4.0 km	MPC · JPL
831430	2009 SO_{105}	—	August 18, 2009	Kitt Peak	Spacewatch	·	2.0 km	MPC · JPL
831431	2009 SQ_{118}	—	May 29, 2008	Mount Lemmon	Mount Lemmon Survey	·	1.6 km	MPC · JPL
831432	2009 SG_{130}	—	September 18, 2009	Kitt Peak	Spacewatch	·	1.9 km	MPC · JPL
831433	2009 SR_{131}	—	October 1, 2005	Mount Lemmon	Mount Lemmon Survey	·	820 m	MPC · JPL
831434	2009 SU_{135}	—	September 18, 2009	Kitt Peak	Spacewatch	·	1.8 km	MPC · JPL
831435	2009 SQ_{142}	—	November 10, 2004	Kitt Peak	Spacewatch	·	1.3 km	MPC · JPL
831436	2009 SM_{143}	—	September 12, 2009	Kitt Peak	Spacewatch	·	1.7 km	MPC · JPL
831437	2009 ST_{146}	—	September 19, 2009	Kitt Peak	Spacewatch	L4	9.0 km	MPC · JPL
831438	2009 SV_{147}	—	September 19, 2009	Mount Lemmon	Mount Lemmon Survey	·	2.1 km	MPC · JPL
831439	2009 SK_{148}	—	September 19, 2009	Mount Lemmon	Mount Lemmon Survey	·	1.3 km	MPC · JPL
831440	2009 SO_{153}	—	September 12, 2009	Kitt Peak	Spacewatch	NYS	1.2 km	MPC · JPL
831441	2009 SN_{160}	—	December 5, 2005	Kitt Peak	Spacewatch	·	1.0 km	MPC · JPL
831442	2009 SC_{165}	—	September 21, 2009	Mount Lemmon	Mount Lemmon Survey	·	2.0 km	MPC · JPL
831443	2009 SK_{166}	—	September 18, 2009	Mount Lemmon	Mount Lemmon Survey	THM	1.5 km	MPC · JPL
831444	2009 ST_{167}	—	September 23, 2009	Mount Lemmon	Mount Lemmon Survey	·	1.8 km	MPC · JPL
831445	2009 SU_{167}	—	September 23, 2009	Mount Lemmon	Mount Lemmon Survey	·	860 m	MPC · JPL
831446	2009 SA_{171}	—	August 17, 2009	Kitt Peak	Spacewatch	·	720 m	MPC · JPL
831447	2009 SB_{176}	—	September 19, 2009	Mount Lemmon	Mount Lemmon Survey	·	2.1 km	MPC · JPL
831448	2009 SS_{176}	—	September 19, 2009	Mount Lemmon	Mount Lemmon Survey	·	830 m	MPC · JPL
831449	2009 SG_{177}	—	September 20, 2009	Kitt Peak	Spacewatch	TIR	2.1 km	MPC · JPL
831450	2009 SY_{177}	—	September 20, 2009	Kitt Peak	Spacewatch	·	2.2 km	MPC · JPL
831451	2009 SC_{179}	—	September 20, 2009	Mount Lemmon	Mount Lemmon Survey	·	1.6 km	MPC · JPL
831452	2009 SC_{181}	—	November 14, 2006	Kitt Peak	Spacewatch	·	400 m	MPC · JPL
831453	2009 SR_{181}	—	September 21, 2009	Mount Lemmon	Mount Lemmon Survey	·	2.7 km	MPC · JPL
831454	2009 SL_{184}	—	September 17, 2009	Kitt Peak	Spacewatch	·	2.0 km	MPC · JPL
831455	2009 SO_{198}	—	September 22, 2009	Kitt Peak	Spacewatch	EMA	3.1 km	MPC · JPL
831456	2009 SF_{201}	—	September 18, 2009	Kitt Peak	Spacewatch	·	1.7 km	MPC · JPL
831457	2009 SA_{202}	—	September 22, 2009	Kitt Peak	Spacewatch	·	1.3 km	MPC · JPL
831458	2009 SU_{205}	—	September 22, 2009	Kitt Peak	Spacewatch	THM	1.6 km	MPC · JPL
831459	2009 SN_{215}	—	September 15, 2009	Kitt Peak	Spacewatch	NYS	660 m	MPC · JPL
831460	2009 SY_{215}	—	September 15, 2009	Kitt Peak	Spacewatch	·	1.4 km	MPC · JPL
831461	2009 SQ_{216}	—	September 24, 2009	Kitt Peak	Spacewatch	MAS	690 m	MPC · JPL
831462	2009 SA_{218}	—	September 24, 2009	Kitt Peak	Spacewatch	MAS	600 m	MPC · JPL
831463	2009 SH_{220}	—	September 24, 2009	Mount Lemmon	Mount Lemmon Survey	KON	1.3 km	MPC · JPL
831464	2009 SR_{221}	—	September 17, 2009	Kitt Peak	Spacewatch	·	1.6 km	MPC · JPL
831465	2009 SM_{224}	—	September 25, 2009	Mount Lemmon	Mount Lemmon Survey	·	560 m	MPC · JPL
831466	2009 SX_{233}	—	September 23, 2009	Kitt Peak	Spacewatch	·	740 m	MPC · JPL
831467	2009 SQ_{235}	—	September 17, 2009	Kitt Peak	Spacewatch	·	1.2 km	MPC · JPL
831468	2009 SQ_{238}	—	August 17, 2009	Catalina	CSS	·	1.8 km	MPC · JPL
831469	2009 SZ_{250}	—	September 16, 2009	Kitt Peak	Spacewatch	·	2.5 km	MPC · JPL
831470	2009 SY_{263}	—	September 23, 2009	Mount Lemmon	Mount Lemmon Survey	·	590 m	MPC · JPL
831471	2009 ST_{266}	—	September 23, 2009	Mount Lemmon	Mount Lemmon Survey	·	1.9 km	MPC · JPL
831472	2009 ST_{267}	—	September 23, 2009	Zelenchukskaya	T. V. Krjačko, B. Satovski	·	2.4 km	MPC · JPL
831473	2009 SA_{272}	—	September 16, 2009	Kitt Peak	Spacewatch	·	1.3 km	MPC · JPL
831474	2009 SB_{272}	—	September 24, 2009	Kitt Peak	Spacewatch	·	430 m	MPC · JPL
831475	2009 SS_{276}	—	November 5, 2005	Kitt Peak	Spacewatch	·	1.0 km	MPC · JPL
831476	2009 SK_{281}	—	March 9, 2007	Kitt Peak	Spacewatch	·	1.7 km	MPC · JPL
831477	2009 SC_{282}	—	September 25, 2009	Kitt Peak	Spacewatch	·	1.9 km	MPC · JPL
831478	2009 SK_{284}	—	September 25, 2009	Catalina	CSS	THB	3.0 km	MPC · JPL
831479	2009 SR_{286}	—	September 17, 2009	Kitt Peak	Spacewatch	PHO	1.5 km	MPC · JPL
831480	2009 SG_{287}	—	September 25, 2009	Kitt Peak	Spacewatch	·	1.9 km	MPC · JPL
831481	2009 SC_{291}	—	September 25, 2009	Kitt Peak	Spacewatch	·	830 m	MPC · JPL
831482	2009 SX_{292}	—	August 18, 2009	Kitt Peak	Spacewatch	·	1.2 km	MPC · JPL
831483	2009 SE_{294}	—	September 15, 2009	Kitt Peak	Spacewatch	THM	1.8 km	MPC · JPL
831484	2009 SO_{296}	—	September 27, 2009	Kitt Peak	Spacewatch	·	1.8 km	MPC · JPL
831485	2009 SO_{300}	—	September 16, 2009	Kitt Peak	Spacewatch	·	1.7 km	MPC · JPL
831486	2009 SH_{301}	—	July 25, 2014	Haleakala	Pan-STARRS 1	·	1.9 km	MPC · JPL
831487	2009 SW_{301}	—	August 29, 2009	Kitt Peak	Spacewatch	LIX	2.5 km	MPC · JPL
831488	2009 SE_{303}	—	September 16, 2009	Mount Lemmon	Mount Lemmon Survey	·	830 m	MPC · JPL
831489	2009 SN_{304}	—	August 27, 2009	Kitt Peak	Spacewatch	THM	1.7 km	MPC · JPL
831490	2009 SB_{308}	—	September 17, 2009	Mount Lemmon	Mount Lemmon Survey	·	1.6 km	MPC · JPL
831491	2009 SO_{314}	—	September 19, 2009	Kitt Peak	Spacewatch	·	670 m	MPC · JPL
831492	2009 SE_{319}	—	September 16, 2009	Kitt Peak	Spacewatch	·	2.0 km	MPC · JPL
831493	2009 SF_{319}	—	September 20, 2009	Kitt Peak	Spacewatch	·	1.3 km	MPC · JPL
831494	2009 SM_{319}	—	September 15, 2009	Kitt Peak	Spacewatch	·	3.4 km	MPC · JPL
831495	2009 SL_{321}	—	September 21, 2009	Kitt Peak	Spacewatch	LIX	2.4 km	MPC · JPL
831496	2009 SZ_{325}	—	September 27, 2009	Mount Lemmon	Mount Lemmon Survey	DOR	2.1 km	MPC · JPL
831497	2009 ST_{332}	—	August 16, 2009	Kitt Peak	Spacewatch	NYS	880 m	MPC · JPL
831498	2009 SM_{334}	—	September 26, 1992	Kitt Peak	Spacewatch	·	4.1 km	MPC · JPL
831499	2009 SX_{335}	—	September 22, 2009	Kitt Peak	Spacewatch	·	2.2 km	MPC · JPL
831500	2009 SW_{336}	—	September 22, 2009	Catalina	CSS	·	1.6 km	MPC · JPL

== 831501–831600 ==
back to top

Designation			Discovery			Properties		Ref
Permanent	Provisional	Named after	Date	Site	Discoverer(s)	Category	Diam.	Ref
831501	2009 SC_{340}	—	September 17, 2009	Mount Lemmon	Mount Lemmon Survey	TIR	2.2 km	MPC · JPL
831502	2009 SM_{344}	—	September 18, 2009	Catalina	CSS	·	2.0 km	MPC · JPL
831503	2009 SO_{347}	—	September 28, 2009	Mount Lemmon	Mount Lemmon Survey	·	610 m	MPC · JPL
831504	2009 SD_{348}	—	September 18, 2009	Kitt Peak	Spacewatch	·	2.2 km	MPC · JPL
831505	2009 SR_{349}	—	September 30, 2009	Mount Lemmon	Mount Lemmon Survey	·	2.5 km	MPC · JPL
831506	2009 SC_{351}	—	September 28, 2009	Mount Lemmon	Mount Lemmon Survey	·	480 m	MPC · JPL
831507	2009 SR_{358}	—	September 18, 2009	Kitt Peak	Spacewatch	·	1.9 km	MPC · JPL
831508	2009 SJ_{361}	—	September 30, 2009	Mount Lemmon	Mount Lemmon Survey	·	2.0 km	MPC · JPL
831509	2009 SP_{366}	—	September 19, 2009	Palomar	Palomar Transient Factory	·	2.3 km	MPC · JPL
831510	2009 SU_{368}	—	February 4, 2016	Haleakala	Pan-STARRS 1	·	1.0 km	MPC · JPL
831511	2009 SA_{371}	—	September 19, 2009	Mount Lemmon	Mount Lemmon Survey	·	510 m	MPC · JPL
831512	2009 SP_{373}	—	September 16, 2009	Mount Lemmon	Mount Lemmon Survey	·	990 m	MPC · JPL
831513	2009 SO_{375}	—	September 16, 2009	Mount Lemmon	Mount Lemmon Survey	·	3.4 km	MPC · JPL
831514	2009 SW_{375}	—	September 30, 2009	Mount Lemmon	Mount Lemmon Survey	·	920 m	MPC · JPL
831515	2009 SQ_{376}	—	December 2, 2010	Kitt Peak	Spacewatch	EOS	1.6 km	MPC · JPL
831516	2009 SH_{378}	—	January 27, 2016	Haleakala	Pan-STARRS 1	H	380 m	MPC · JPL
831517	2009 SO_{378}	—	August 20, 2009	Kitt Peak	Spacewatch	·	740 m	MPC · JPL
831518	2009 SP_{379}	—	September 17, 2009	Kitt Peak	Spacewatch	·	740 m	MPC · JPL
831519	2009 SU_{379}	—	August 18, 2009	Kitt Peak	Spacewatch	·	600 m	MPC · JPL
831520	2009 SX_{379}	—	September 21, 2009	Mount Lemmon	Mount Lemmon Survey	T_{j} (2.98)	3.0 km	MPC · JPL
831521	2009 SL_{380}	—	September 9, 2015	Haleakala	Pan-STARRS 1	·	2.0 km	MPC · JPL
831522	2009 SH_{381}	—	September 23, 2009	Kitt Peak	Spacewatch	·	1.0 km	MPC · JPL
831523	2009 SG_{383}	—	September 21, 2009	Mount Lemmon	Mount Lemmon Survey	(5)	920 m	MPC · JPL
831524	2009 SX_{383}	—	August 30, 2016	Haleakala	Pan-STARRS 1	·	580 m	MPC · JPL
831525	2009 SP_{384}	—	September 16, 2009	Mount Lemmon	Mount Lemmon Survey	·	1.3 km	MPC · JPL
831526	2009 SC_{385}	—	September 1, 2013	Mount Lemmon	Mount Lemmon Survey	·	860 m	MPC · JPL
831527	2009 SS_{385}	—	July 27, 2017	Haleakala	Pan-STARRS 1	·	860 m	MPC · JPL
831528	2009 SY_{388}	—	September 28, 2009	Mount Lemmon	Mount Lemmon Survey	·	620 m	MPC · JPL
831529	2009 SC_{389}	—	September 17, 2009	Kitt Peak	Spacewatch	·	420 m	MPC · JPL
831530	2009 SE_{390}	—	September 21, 2009	Catalina	CSS	·	1.9 km	MPC · JPL
831531	2009 SN_{391}	—	September 29, 2009	Mount Lemmon	Mount Lemmon Survey	·	580 m	MPC · JPL
831532	2009 SH_{392}	—	September 23, 2015	Haleakala	Pan-STARRS 1	·	2.1 km	MPC · JPL
831533	2009 SR_{392}	—	September 27, 2009	Kitt Peak	Spacewatch	·	530 m	MPC · JPL
831534	2009 SA_{393}	—	September 28, 2009	Mount Lemmon	Mount Lemmon Survey	ERI	1.1 km	MPC · JPL
831535	2009 SN_{393}	—	September 16, 2009	Mount Lemmon	Mount Lemmon Survey	·	2.2 km	MPC · JPL
831536	2009 SF_{394}	—	September 27, 2009	Mount Lemmon	Mount Lemmon Survey	·	1.8 km	MPC · JPL
831537	2009 SY_{394}	—	September 24, 2014	Roque de los Muchachos	EURONEAR	KOR	940 m	MPC · JPL
831538	2009 SV_{395}	—	July 30, 2014	Haleakala	Pan-STARRS 1	(1118)	2.2 km	MPC · JPL
831539	2009 SF_{397}	—	September 23, 2009	Kitt Peak	Spacewatch	3:2	3.8 km	MPC · JPL
831540	2009 ST_{397}	—	September 20, 2009	Kitt Peak	Spacewatch	·	1.5 km	MPC · JPL
831541	2009 SV_{399}	—	September 18, 2009	Kitt Peak	Spacewatch	·	1.7 km	MPC · JPL
831542	2009 SB_{404}	—	September 17, 2009	Catalina	CSS	·	2.0 km	MPC · JPL
831543	2009 SD_{404}	—	September 21, 2009	Mount Lemmon	Mount Lemmon Survey	T_{j} (2.99)	3.0 km	MPC · JPL
831544	2009 SF_{404}	—	September 27, 2009	Mount Lemmon	Mount Lemmon Survey	·	2.1 km	MPC · JPL
831545	2009 SQ_{404}	—	September 30, 2009	Mount Lemmon	Mount Lemmon Survey	·	1.5 km	MPC · JPL
831546	2009 SW_{404}	—	September 21, 2009	Mount Lemmon	Mount Lemmon Survey	·	940 m	MPC · JPL
831547	2009 SY_{404}	—	September 17, 2009	Mount Lemmon	Mount Lemmon Survey	·	1.7 km	MPC · JPL
831548	2009 SB_{405}	—	September 21, 2009	Mount Lemmon	Mount Lemmon Survey	·	1.8 km	MPC · JPL
831549	2009 SZ_{406}	—	September 21, 2009	Mount Lemmon	Mount Lemmon Survey	·	800 m	MPC · JPL
831550	2009 SQ_{407}	—	September 27, 2009	Kitt Peak	Spacewatch	·	1.9 km	MPC · JPL
831551	2009 SX_{407}	—	September 23, 2009	Mount Lemmon	Mount Lemmon Survey	·	2.2 km	MPC · JPL
831552	2009 SB_{409}	—	September 28, 2009	Kitt Peak	Spacewatch	·	1.6 km	MPC · JPL
831553	2009 SW_{411}	—	September 23, 2009	Zelenchukskaya	T. V. Krjačko, B. Satovski	·	2.0 km	MPC · JPL
831554	2009 SG_{412}	—	September 28, 2009	Kitt Peak	Spacewatch	·	930 m	MPC · JPL
831555	2009 SF_{414}	—	September 28, 2009	Mount Lemmon	Mount Lemmon Survey	DOR	1.8 km	MPC · JPL
831556	2009 SV_{418}	—	September 29, 2009	Kitt Peak	Spacewatch	·	460 m	MPC · JPL
831557	2009 SC_{419}	—	September 17, 2009	Mount Lemmon	Mount Lemmon Survey	·	480 m	MPC · JPL
831558	2009 SR_{419}	—	September 29, 2009	Mount Lemmon	Mount Lemmon Survey	·	700 m	MPC · JPL
831559	2009 SL_{420}	—	September 21, 2009	Mount Lemmon	Mount Lemmon Survey	3:2 · SHU	3.9 km	MPC · JPL
831560	2009 SE_{421}	—	September 27, 2009	Kitt Peak	Spacewatch	·	1.8 km	MPC · JPL
831561	2009 SU_{422}	—	September 21, 2009	Mount Lemmon	Mount Lemmon Survey	EUN	770 m	MPC · JPL
831562	2009 SB_{426}	—	September 19, 2009	Mount Lemmon	Mount Lemmon Survey	·	1.0 km	MPC · JPL
831563	2009 TX_{3}	—	October 9, 2009	Andrushivka	Y. Ivaščenko, Kyrylenko, P.	·	3.7 km	MPC · JPL
831564	2009 TE_{6}	—	September 15, 2009	Kitt Peak	Spacewatch	·	1.3 km	MPC · JPL
831565	2009 TU_{11}	—	October 14, 2009	La Sagra	OAM	PHO	750 m	MPC · JPL
831566	2009 TF_{12}	—	September 23, 2009	Mount Lemmon	Mount Lemmon Survey	·	1.3 km	MPC · JPL
831567	2009 TT_{23}	—	October 14, 2009	Kitt Peak	Spacewatch	·	790 m	MPC · JPL
831568	2009 TX_{30}	—	January 28, 2007	Kitt Peak	Spacewatch	·	590 m	MPC · JPL
831569	2009 TS_{34}	—	September 23, 2009	Kitt Peak	Spacewatch	·	2.3 km	MPC · JPL
831570	2009 TJ_{44}	—	October 14, 2009	Kitt Peak	Spacewatch	·	1.7 km	MPC · JPL
831571	2009 TQ_{44}	—	October 13, 2009	La Sagra	OAM	·	3.1 km	MPC · JPL
831572	2009 TV_{44}	—	October 14, 2009	XuYi	PMO NEO Survey Program	·	2.5 km	MPC · JPL
831573	2009 TS_{45}	—	October 15, 2009	Catalina	CSS	·	3.7 km	MPC · JPL
831574	2009 TC_{48}	—	September 18, 2009	Kitt Peak	Spacewatch	·	530 m	MPC · JPL
831575	2009 TY_{50}	—	October 14, 2009	Mount Lemmon	Mount Lemmon Survey	·	1.8 km	MPC · JPL
831576	2009 TN_{51}	—	October 12, 2009	Kitt Peak	Spacewatch	THM	1.4 km	MPC · JPL
831577	2009 TO_{52}	—	October 15, 2009	Mount Lemmon	Mount Lemmon Survey	H	290 m	MPC · JPL
831578	2009 TY_{53}	—	May 18, 2017	Mount Lemmon	Mount Lemmon Survey	JUN	960 m	MPC · JPL
831579	2009 TR_{55}	—	October 12, 2009	Mount Lemmon	Mount Lemmon Survey	·	2.4 km	MPC · JPL
831580	2009 TQ_{56}	—	October 14, 2009	Mount Lemmon	Mount Lemmon Survey	·	460 m	MPC · JPL
831581	2009 TC_{57}	—	October 15, 2009	Mount Lemmon	Mount Lemmon Survey	(5)	660 m	MPC · JPL
831582	2009 TY_{57}	—	October 1, 2009	Mount Lemmon	Mount Lemmon Survey	·	1.2 km	MPC · JPL
831583	2009 UP_{8}	—	September 12, 2002	Palomar	NEAT	·	520 m	MPC · JPL
831584	2009 UK_{13}	—	October 18, 2009	Kitt Peak	Spacewatch	KRM	1.3 km	MPC · JPL
831585	2009 UA_{16}	—	October 18, 2009	Mount Lemmon	Mount Lemmon Survey	·	520 m	MPC · JPL
831586	2009 UX_{18}	—	September 16, 2009	Kitt Peak	Spacewatch	GEF	940 m	MPC · JPL
831587	2009 UE_{22}	—	September 16, 2009	Kitt Peak	Spacewatch	THM	1.7 km	MPC · JPL
831588	2009 UR_{27}	—	September 18, 2009	Mount Lemmon	Mount Lemmon Survey	·	900 m	MPC · JPL
831589	2009 UU_{27}	—	November 11, 2006	Kitt Peak	Spacewatch	·	510 m	MPC · JPL
831590	2009 UT_{30}	—	September 21, 2009	Mount Lemmon	Mount Lemmon Survey	·	790 m	MPC · JPL
831591	2009 UX_{32}	—	October 19, 2003	Sacramento Peak	SDSS	THM	1.5 km	MPC · JPL
831592	2009 UN_{39}	—	October 22, 2009	Kitt Peak	Spacewatch	·	2.5 km	MPC · JPL
831593	2009 UE_{41}	—	September 26, 2009	Kitt Peak	Spacewatch	·	1.9 km	MPC · JPL
831594	2009 UZ_{41}	—	September 18, 2009	Kitt Peak	Spacewatch	KOR	1.1 km	MPC · JPL
831595	2009 UG_{44}	—	October 18, 2009	Mount Lemmon	Mount Lemmon Survey	·	480 m	MPC · JPL
831596	2009 UL_{44}	—	April 27, 2012	Haleakala	Pan-STARRS 1	·	670 m	MPC · JPL
831597	2009 UW_{44}	—	October 18, 2009	Mount Lemmon	Mount Lemmon Survey	·	1.9 km	MPC · JPL
831598	2009 UD_{45}	—	September 17, 2009	Mount Lemmon	Mount Lemmon Survey	·	1.9 km	MPC · JPL
831599	2009 UR_{45}	—	October 18, 2009	Mount Lemmon	Mount Lemmon Survey	THM	1.4 km	MPC · JPL
831600	2009 UN_{52}	—	February 23, 2007	Mount Lemmon	Mount Lemmon Survey	·	700 m	MPC · JPL

== 831601–831700 ==
back to top

Designation			Discovery			Properties		Ref
Permanent	Provisional	Named after	Date	Site	Discoverer(s)	Category	Diam.	Ref
831601	2009 UK_{56}	—	October 14, 2009	Catalina	CSS	·	3.2 km	MPC · JPL
831602	2009 UO_{57}	—	October 23, 2009	Mount Lemmon	Mount Lemmon Survey	·	2.2 km	MPC · JPL
831603	2009 UK_{59}	—	October 23, 2009	Kitt Peak	Spacewatch	·	1 km	MPC · JPL
831604	2009 UT_{60}	—	September 28, 2009	Mount Lemmon	Mount Lemmon Survey	·	2.8 km	MPC · JPL
831605	2009 UK_{65}	—	October 17, 2009	Mount Lemmon	Mount Lemmon Survey	L4	7.9 km	MPC · JPL
831606	2009 UQ_{70}	—	October 22, 2009	Mount Lemmon	Mount Lemmon Survey	·	2.0 km	MPC · JPL
831607	2009 UG_{71}	—	January 12, 2006	Palomar	NEAT	·	1.4 km	MPC · JPL
831608	2009 UP_{73}	—	October 18, 2009	Mount Lemmon	Mount Lemmon Survey	·	850 m	MPC · JPL
831609	2009 UU_{75}	—	September 18, 2009	Kitt Peak	Spacewatch	·	2.1 km	MPC · JPL
831610	2009 UV_{75}	—	October 21, 2009	Mount Lemmon	Mount Lemmon Survey	·	1.0 km	MPC · JPL
831611	2009 UR_{77}	—	October 21, 2009	Mount Lemmon	Mount Lemmon Survey	·	2.1 km	MPC · JPL
831612	2009 UT_{79}	—	October 22, 2009	Mount Lemmon	Mount Lemmon Survey	·	830 m	MPC · JPL
831613	2009 UR_{80}	—	October 4, 1996	Kitt Peak	Spacewatch	·	540 m	MPC · JPL
831614	2009 UK_{85}	—	October 23, 2009	Mount Lemmon	Mount Lemmon Survey	·	1.7 km	MPC · JPL
831615	2009 UQ_{85}	—	October 23, 2009	Mount Lemmon	Mount Lemmon Survey	·	620 m	MPC · JPL
831616	2009 UW_{86}	—	September 16, 2009	Mount Lemmon	Mount Lemmon Survey	·	2.0 km	MPC · JPL
831617	2009 UM_{89}	—	October 22, 2009	Bisei	BATTeRS	·	3.5 km	MPC · JPL
831618	2009 UO_{89}	—	October 22, 2009	Bisei	BATTeRS	L4	7.5 km	MPC · JPL
831619	2009 UZ_{89}	—	October 23, 2009	Mount Lemmon	Mount Lemmon Survey	·	4.1 km	MPC · JPL
831620	2009 UH_{93}	—	October 26, 2009	Bisei	BATTeRS	·	2.5 km	MPC · JPL
831621	2009 UH_{101}	—	October 23, 2009	Mount Lemmon	Mount Lemmon Survey	DOR	1.8 km	MPC · JPL
831622	2009 UZ_{106}	—	October 22, 2009	Mount Lemmon	Mount Lemmon Survey	·	2.3 km	MPC · JPL
831623	2009 UQ_{110}	—	October 23, 2009	Kitt Peak	Spacewatch	·	2.1 km	MPC · JPL
831624	2009 US_{112}	—	August 28, 2005	Kitt Peak	Spacewatch	NYS	880 m	MPC · JPL
831625	2009 UT_{113}	—	September 28, 2009	Kitt Peak	Spacewatch	THM	1.6 km	MPC · JPL
831626	2009 UD_{115}	—	September 22, 2009	Kitt Peak	Spacewatch	PHO	610 m	MPC · JPL
831627	2009 UN_{118}	—	September 5, 2000	Sacramento Peak	SDSS	·	1.3 km	MPC · JPL
831628	2009 UA_{120}	—	September 28, 2009	Mount Lemmon	Mount Lemmon Survey	H	380 m	MPC · JPL
831629	2009 UT_{123}	—	October 26, 2009	Mount Lemmon	Mount Lemmon Survey	·	2.4 km	MPC · JPL
831630	2009 UR_{124}	—	October 26, 2009	Mount Lemmon	Mount Lemmon Survey	EOS	1.3 km	MPC · JPL
831631	2009 UR_{128}	—	October 26, 2009	Mount Lemmon	Mount Lemmon Survey	DOR	1.6 km	MPC · JPL
831632	2009 UK_{129}	—	October 18, 2009	Catalina	CSS	·	1.5 km	MPC · JPL
831633	2009 UT_{131}	—	September 21, 2009	Kitt Peak	Spacewatch	·	1.4 km	MPC · JPL
831634	2009 UB_{132}	—	October 2, 2009	Mount Lemmon	Mount Lemmon Survey	·	2.6 km	MPC · JPL
831635	2009 UB_{135}	—	October 24, 2009	Kitt Peak	Spacewatch	EUP	3.8 km	MPC · JPL
831636	2009 UQ_{135}	—	October 16, 2009	La Sagra	OAM	·	2.5 km	MPC · JPL
831637	2009 UX_{140}	—	October 27, 2009	Kitt Peak	Spacewatch	·	400 m	MPC · JPL
831638	2009 UF_{147}	—	October 22, 2009	Mount Lemmon	Mount Lemmon Survey	EOS	1.5 km	MPC · JPL
831639	2009 UD_{151}	—	October 24, 2009	Kitt Peak	Spacewatch	·	470 m	MPC · JPL
831640	2009 UV_{151}	—	October 16, 2009	Socorro	LINEAR	·	880 m	MPC · JPL
831641	2009 UL_{152}	—	October 26, 2009	Kitt Peak	Spacewatch	LIX	3.0 km	MPC · JPL
831642	2009 UL_{163}	—	September 19, 2009	Kitt Peak	Spacewatch	·	2.6 km	MPC · JPL
831643	2009 UZ_{163}	—	April 13, 2012	Haleakala	Pan-STARRS 1	·	2.3 km	MPC · JPL
831644	2009 UL_{164}	—	October 16, 2009	Mount Lemmon	Mount Lemmon Survey	VER	2.0 km	MPC · JPL
831645	2009 US_{164}	—	January 12, 2011	Mount Lemmon	Mount Lemmon Survey	·	2.2 km	MPC · JPL
831646	2009 UT_{164}	—	October 25, 2009	Mount Lemmon	Mount Lemmon Survey	·	900 m	MPC · JPL
831647	2009 UC_{165}	—	October 22, 2009	Mount Lemmon	Mount Lemmon Survey	·	2.4 km	MPC · JPL
831648	2009 UK_{165}	—	October 17, 2009	Mount Lemmon	Mount Lemmon Survey	·	3.3 km	MPC · JPL
831649	2009 UO_{165}	—	October 23, 2009	Mount Lemmon	Mount Lemmon Survey	MAS	470 m	MPC · JPL
831650	2009 UP_{165}	—	April 14, 2016	Haleakala	Pan-STARRS 1	H	400 m	MPC · JPL
831651	2009 UR_{165}	—	October 26, 2009	Mount Lemmon	Mount Lemmon Survey	·	550 m	MPC · JPL
831652	2009 UA_{166}	—	October 27, 2009	Mount Lemmon	Mount Lemmon Survey	EUP	2.9 km	MPC · JPL
831653	2009 UN_{166}	—	October 26, 2009	Kitt Peak	Spacewatch	(2076)	500 m	MPC · JPL
831654	2009 UA_{167}	—	October 26, 2009	Mount Lemmon	Mount Lemmon Survey	·	930 m	MPC · JPL
831655	2009 UX_{167}	—	January 14, 2016	Haleakala	Pan-STARRS 1	·	1.2 km	MPC · JPL
831656	2009 UF_{168}	—	October 16, 2009	Catalina	CSS	·	1.6 km	MPC · JPL
831657	2009 UJ_{170}	—	October 22, 2009	Mount Lemmon	Mount Lemmon Survey	·	1.5 km	MPC · JPL
831658	2009 UK_{170}	—	June 27, 2014	Haleakala	Pan-STARRS 1	·	1.7 km	MPC · JPL
831659	2009 UY_{170}	—	October 27, 2009	Kitt Peak	Spacewatch	·	1.9 km	MPC · JPL
831660	2009 UZ_{175}	—	October 25, 2009	Kitt Peak	Spacewatch	MAS	490 m	MPC · JPL
831661	2009 UH_{178}	—	October 30, 2009	Mount Lemmon	Mount Lemmon Survey	·	2.2 km	MPC · JPL
831662	2009 UK_{178}	—	October 30, 2009	Mount Lemmon	Mount Lemmon Survey	·	2.1 km	MPC · JPL
831663	2009 UM_{178}	—	October 30, 2009	Mount Lemmon	Mount Lemmon Survey	(5931)	2.6 km	MPC · JPL
831664	2009 UO_{178}	—	October 25, 2009	Catalina	CSS	·	2.1 km	MPC · JPL
831665	2009 UG_{179}	—	October 24, 2009	Kitt Peak	Spacewatch	·	2.1 km	MPC · JPL
831666	2009 UK_{180}	—	October 24, 2009	Kitt Peak	Spacewatch	MAS	410 m	MPC · JPL
831667	2009 UN_{180}	—	October 23, 2009	Mount Lemmon	Mount Lemmon Survey	·	2.2 km	MPC · JPL
831668	2009 UO_{180}	—	October 24, 2009	Kitt Peak	Spacewatch	·	2.1 km	MPC · JPL
831669	2009 UK_{181}	—	October 24, 2009	Kitt Peak	Spacewatch	·	2.2 km	MPC · JPL
831670	2009 UL_{181}	—	October 16, 2009	Mount Lemmon	Mount Lemmon Survey	·	1.7 km	MPC · JPL
831671	2009 UH_{184}	—	October 27, 2009	Mount Lemmon	Mount Lemmon Survey	·	430 m	MPC · JPL
831672	2009 UQ_{186}	—	October 16, 2009	Mount Lemmon	Mount Lemmon Survey	·	950 m	MPC · JPL
831673	2009 UH_{187}	—	October 24, 2009	Kitt Peak	Spacewatch	L4	5.9 km	MPC · JPL
831674	2009 UP_{191}	—	October 22, 2009	Mount Lemmon	Mount Lemmon Survey	·	2.3 km	MPC · JPL
831675	2009 UB_{193}	—	October 24, 2009	Kitt Peak	Spacewatch	·	1.3 km	MPC · JPL
831676	2009 VH_{2}	—	November 9, 2009	Socorro	LINEAR	PHO	1.7 km	MPC · JPL
831677	2009 VM_{2}	—	November 9, 2009	Socorro	LINEAR	·	4.1 km	MPC · JPL
831678	2009 VJ_{3}	—	November 10, 2009	Calvin-Rehoboth	L. A. Molnar	·	2.6 km	MPC · JPL
831679	2009 VK_{7}	—	October 24, 2009	Kitt Peak	Spacewatch	·	1.5 km	MPC · JPL
831680	2009 VK_{13}	—	November 8, 2009	Mount Lemmon	Mount Lemmon Survey	PHO	1.8 km	MPC · JPL
831681	2009 VX_{15}	—	October 18, 2009	Mount Lemmon	Mount Lemmon Survey	·	550 m	MPC · JPL
831682	2009 VP_{16}	—	November 8, 2009	Mount Lemmon	Mount Lemmon Survey	·	1.3 km	MPC · JPL
831683	2009 VA_{27}	—	October 12, 2009	Mount Lemmon	Mount Lemmon Survey	·	1.6 km	MPC · JPL
831684	2009 VX_{29}	—	October 26, 2009	Kitt Peak	Spacewatch	·	2.7 km	MPC · JPL
831685	2009 VF_{35}	—	November 10, 2009	Mount Lemmon	Mount Lemmon Survey	·	870 m	MPC · JPL
831686	2009 VR_{35}	—	November 10, 2009	Mount Lemmon	Mount Lemmon Survey	·	670 m	MPC · JPL
831687	2009 VN_{36}	—	February 21, 2001	Sacramento Peak	SDSS	·	1.9 km	MPC · JPL
831688	2009 VA_{40}	—	October 30, 2009	Mount Lemmon	Mount Lemmon Survey	·	1.6 km	MPC · JPL
831689	2009 VB_{41}	—	October 30, 2009	Mount Lemmon	Mount Lemmon Survey	·	4.2 km	MPC · JPL
831690	2009 VG_{42}	—	November 12, 2009	Needville	J. Dellinger, M. Eastman	·	2.6 km	MPC · JPL
831691	2009 VL_{43}	—	September 22, 2009	Mount Lemmon	Mount Lemmon Survey	·	2.4 km	MPC · JPL
831692	2009 VQ_{46}	—	October 26, 2009	Mount Lemmon	Mount Lemmon Survey	·	840 m	MPC · JPL
831693	2009 VN_{47}	—	October 23, 2009	Mount Lemmon	Mount Lemmon Survey	·	3.9 km	MPC · JPL
831694	2009 VQ_{49}	—	November 11, 2009	Mount Lemmon	Mount Lemmon Survey	H	300 m	MPC · JPL
831695	2009 VY_{50}	—	October 14, 2009	Mount Lemmon	Mount Lemmon Survey	·	1.9 km	MPC · JPL
831696	2009 VA_{53}	—	November 10, 2009	Mount Lemmon	Mount Lemmon Survey	·	1.4 km	MPC · JPL
831697	2009 VF_{57}	—	September 21, 2009	Mount Lemmon	Mount Lemmon Survey	·	3.5 km	MPC · JPL
831698	2009 VA_{58}	—	August 31, 2005	Palomar	NEAT	PHO	800 m	MPC · JPL
831699	2009 VL_{60}	—	October 25, 2009	Kitt Peak	Spacewatch	·	580 m	MPC · JPL
831700	2009 VH_{63}	—	October 16, 2009	Mount Lemmon	Mount Lemmon Survey	·	1.7 km	MPC · JPL

== 831701–831800 ==
back to top

Designation			Discovery			Properties		Ref
Permanent	Provisional	Named after	Date	Site	Discoverer(s)	Category	Diam.	Ref
831701	2009 VM_{63}	—	October 30, 2009	Mount Lemmon	Mount Lemmon Survey	·	760 m	MPC · JPL
831702	2009 VC_{64}	—	November 8, 2009	Kitt Peak	Spacewatch	·	740 m	MPC · JPL
831703	2009 VT_{71}	—	September 5, 1999	Kitt Peak	Spacewatch	·	390 m	MPC · JPL
831704	2009 VS_{76}	—	October 16, 2009	Catalina	CSS	·	2.2 km	MPC · JPL
831705	2009 VN_{78}	—	November 9, 2009	Catalina	CSS	·	1.7 km	MPC · JPL
831706	2009 VA_{79}	—	November 10, 2009	Catalina	CSS	BRG	1.1 km	MPC · JPL
831707	2009 VX_{83}	—	November 9, 2009	Kitt Peak	Spacewatch	HYG	1.8 km	MPC · JPL
831708	2009 VL_{84}	—	October 24, 1995	Kitt Peak	Spacewatch	·	1.6 km	MPC · JPL
831709	2009 VE_{85}	—	October 27, 2009	Kitt Peak	Spacewatch	·	2.0 km	MPC · JPL
831710	2009 VN_{90}	—	September 19, 1998	Sacramento Peak	SDSS	·	1.6 km	MPC · JPL
831711	2009 VR_{94}	—	November 9, 2009	Kitt Peak	Spacewatch	·	3.7 km	MPC · JPL
831712	2009 VS_{98}	—	November 9, 2009	Mount Lemmon	Mount Lemmon Survey	·	930 m	MPC · JPL
831713	2009 VH_{99}	—	November 9, 2009	Kitt Peak	Spacewatch	·	2.4 km	MPC · JPL
831714	2009 VQ_{100}	—	November 10, 2009	Kitt Peak	Spacewatch	(5)	670 m	MPC · JPL
831715	2009 VY_{101}	—	November 11, 2009	Kitt Peak	Spacewatch	·	1.9 km	MPC · JPL
831716	2009 VJ_{104}	—	October 12, 2009	La Sagra	OAM	·	2.0 km	MPC · JPL
831717	2009 VN_{105}	—	October 21, 2009	Catalina	CSS	·	3.4 km	MPC · JPL
831718	2009 VR_{106}	—	October 24, 2009	Mount Lemmon	Mount Lemmon Survey	·	860 m	MPC · JPL
831719	2009 VK_{107}	—	October 19, 1998	Kitt Peak	Spacewatch	·	2.3 km	MPC · JPL
831720	2009 VZ_{107}	—	October 26, 2009	Kitt Peak	Spacewatch	·	1.9 km	MPC · JPL
831721	2009 VC_{108}	—	November 8, 2009	Mount Lemmon	Mount Lemmon Survey	·	1.5 km	MPC · JPL
831722	2009 VF_{108}	—	November 8, 2009	Mount Lemmon	Mount Lemmon Survey	·	1.2 km	MPC · JPL
831723	2009 VU_{110}	—	November 10, 2009	Mount Lemmon	Mount Lemmon Survey	·	2.2 km	MPC · JPL
831724	2009 VC_{114}	—	November 9, 2009	Mount Lemmon	Mount Lemmon Survey	·	1.9 km	MPC · JPL
831725	2009 VZ_{115}	—	October 2, 2000	Socorro	LINEAR	·	1.3 km	MPC · JPL
831726	2009 VJ_{116}	—	November 11, 2009	Socorro	LINEAR	·	2.2 km	MPC · JPL
831727	2009 VQ_{119}	—	September 19, 2012	Mount Lemmon	Mount Lemmon Survey	·	710 m	MPC · JPL
831728	2009 VD_{122}	—	November 8, 2009	Kitt Peak	Spacewatch	·	660 m	MPC · JPL
831729	2009 VZ_{123}	—	November 9, 2009	Kitt Peak	Spacewatch	·	2.9 km	MPC · JPL
831730	2009 VE_{125}	—	November 8, 2009	Mount Lemmon	Mount Lemmon Survey	·	1.2 km	MPC · JPL
831731	2009 VV_{126}	—	November 10, 2009	Kitt Peak	Spacewatch	·	640 m	MPC · JPL
831732	2009 VA_{129}	—	November 11, 2009	Mount Lemmon	Mount Lemmon Survey	·	630 m	MPC · JPL
831733	2009 VZ_{129}	—	November 8, 2009	Mount Lemmon	Mount Lemmon Survey	·	2.4 km	MPC · JPL
831734	2009 WA_{1}	—	November 17, 2009	Siding Spring	SSS	·	720 m	MPC · JPL
831735	2009 WH_{1}	—	November 16, 2009	Nogales	J.-C. Merlin	·	3.3 km	MPC · JPL
831736	2009 WV_{6}	—	November 18, 2009	Sandlot	G. Hug	PHO	2.3 km	MPC · JPL
831737	2009 WL_{7}	—	November 16, 2009	Mount Lemmon	Mount Lemmon Survey	·	650 m	MPC · JPL
831738	2009 WF_{8}	—	November 18, 2009	Saint-Sulpice	B. Christophe	EOS	3.7 km	MPC · JPL
831739	2009 WW_{8}	—	November 20, 2009	Kitt Peak	Spacewatch	·	980 m	MPC · JPL
831740	2009 WD_{14}	—	November 16, 2009	Mount Lemmon	Mount Lemmon Survey	·	750 m	MPC · JPL
831741	2009 WS_{15}	—	November 16, 2009	Mount Lemmon	Mount Lemmon Survey	·	810 m	MPC · JPL
831742	2009 WL_{18}	—	November 17, 2009	Mount Lemmon	Mount Lemmon Survey	·	1.9 km	MPC · JPL
831743	2009 WM_{19}	—	November 17, 2009	Mount Lemmon	Mount Lemmon Survey	NYS	730 m	MPC · JPL
831744	2009 WW_{21}	—	August 28, 2009	Kitt Peak	Spacewatch	·	780 m	MPC · JPL
831745	2009 WC_{23}	—	November 18, 2009	Kitt Peak	Spacewatch	·	1.6 km	MPC · JPL
831746	2009 WK_{24}	—	November 19, 2009	Gaisberg	Gierlinger, R.	·	2.6 km	MPC · JPL
831747	2009 WX_{25}	—	November 8, 2009	Kitt Peak	Spacewatch	·	1.0 km	MPC · JPL
831748	2009 WK_{26}	—	October 17, 2009	Mount Lemmon	Mount Lemmon Survey	·	800 m	MPC · JPL
831749	2009 WG_{29}	—	September 26, 2009	Kitt Peak	Spacewatch	·	2.7 km	MPC · JPL
831750	2009 WS_{31}	—	November 16, 2009	Kitt Peak	Spacewatch	·	530 m	MPC · JPL
831751	2009 WN_{37}	—	September 30, 2003	Kitt Peak	Spacewatch	·	1.8 km	MPC · JPL
831752	2009 WR_{38}	—	November 9, 2009	Kitt Peak	Spacewatch	·	1.2 km	MPC · JPL
831753	2009 WU_{44}	—	November 8, 2009	Kitt Peak	Spacewatch	·	3.8 km	MPC · JPL
831754	2009 WR_{45}	—	October 12, 2009	Mount Lemmon	Mount Lemmon Survey	·	2.9 km	MPC · JPL
831755	2009 WJ_{46}	—	November 18, 2009	Mount Lemmon	Mount Lemmon Survey	MAS	500 m	MPC · JPL
831756	2009 WL_{52}	—	November 18, 2009	La Sagra	OAM	·	570 m	MPC · JPL
831757	2009 WL_{55}	—	November 16, 2009	Mount Lemmon	Mount Lemmon Survey	HYG	1.8 km	MPC · JPL
831758	2009 WT_{55}	—	November 16, 2009	Kitt Peak	Spacewatch	·	1.9 km	MPC · JPL
831759	2009 WT_{58}	—	October 22, 2009	Mount Lemmon	Mount Lemmon Survey	·	1.4 km	MPC · JPL
831760	2009 WM_{60}	—	November 16, 2009	Mount Lemmon	Mount Lemmon Survey	·	430 m	MPC · JPL
831761	2009 WS_{62}	—	November 16, 2009	Mount Lemmon	Mount Lemmon Survey	·	1.3 km	MPC · JPL
831762	2009 WV_{66}	—	October 26, 2009	Kitt Peak	Spacewatch	·	3.5 km	MPC · JPL
831763	2009 WU_{69}	—	October 12, 2009	Mount Lemmon	Mount Lemmon Survey	·	1.5 km	MPC · JPL
831764	2009 WZ_{69}	—	November 18, 2009	Kitt Peak	Spacewatch	L4	6.4 km	MPC · JPL
831765	2009 WX_{74}	—	November 18, 2009	Kitt Peak	Spacewatch	·	2.9 km	MPC · JPL
831766	2009 WT_{75}	—	November 10, 2009	Kitt Peak	Spacewatch	·	3.4 km	MPC · JPL
831767	2009 WU_{78}	—	October 11, 2009	Mount Lemmon	Mount Lemmon Survey	·	810 m	MPC · JPL
831768	2009 WW_{79}	—	July 7, 2005	Mauna Kea	Veillet, C.	·	380 m	MPC · JPL
831769	2009 WN_{81}	—	November 18, 2009	Kitt Peak	Spacewatch	·	2.1 km	MPC · JPL
831770	2009 WB_{84}	—	November 11, 2009	Kitt Peak	Spacewatch	·	3.1 km	MPC · JPL
831771	2009 WG_{86}	—	November 11, 2009	Kitt Peak	Spacewatch	(5)	970 m	MPC · JPL
831772	2009 WL_{86}	—	November 19, 2009	Kitt Peak	Spacewatch	·	820 m	MPC · JPL
831773	2009 WK_{90}	—	November 19, 2009	Kitt Peak	Spacewatch	·	3.0 km	MPC · JPL
831774	2009 WP_{93}	—	September 29, 2003	Kitt Peak	Spacewatch	LIX	2.7 km	MPC · JPL
831775	2009 WQ_{94}	—	November 20, 2009	Kitt Peak	Spacewatch	MAS	500 m	MPC · JPL
831776	2009 WP_{96}	—	November 20, 2009	Mount Lemmon	Mount Lemmon Survey	·	1.8 km	MPC · JPL
831777	2009 WY_{98}	—	September 18, 2009	Mount Lemmon	Mount Lemmon Survey	·	560 m	MPC · JPL
831778	2009 WU_{99}	—	November 21, 2009	Nogales	J.-C. Merlin	LIX	2.9 km	MPC · JPL
831779	2009 WQ_{102}	—	October 5, 2000	Haleakala	NEAT	·	1.5 km	MPC · JPL
831780	2009 WP_{105}	—	November 24, 2009	Nazaret	G. Muler, J. M. Ruiz	·	1.5 km	MPC · JPL
831781	2009 WF_{106}	—	November 25, 2009	Catalina	CSS	APO	730 m	MPC · JPL
831782	2009 WV_{106}	—	November 17, 2009	Kitt Peak	Spacewatch	·	3.2 km	MPC · JPL
831783	2009 WZ_{110}	—	November 17, 2009	Mount Lemmon	Mount Lemmon Survey	·	2.7 km	MPC · JPL
831784	2009 WH_{111}	—	November 17, 2009	Mount Lemmon	Mount Lemmon Survey	·	2.3 km	MPC · JPL
831785	2009 WT_{111}	—	October 2, 2003	Roque de los Muchachos	A. Fitzsimmons	LIX	2.1 km	MPC · JPL
831786	2009 WU_{111}	—	November 17, 2009	Mount Lemmon	Mount Lemmon Survey	HYG	2.4 km	MPC · JPL
831787	2009 WU_{114}	—	November 25, 2005	Kitt Peak	Spacewatch	·	910 m	MPC · JPL
831788	2009 WB_{121}	—	November 20, 2009	Kitt Peak	Spacewatch	·	2.4 km	MPC · JPL
831789	2009 WN_{122}	—	November 20, 2009	Kitt Peak	Spacewatch	·	1.5 km	MPC · JPL
831790	2009 WX_{123}	—	November 20, 2009	Kitt Peak	Spacewatch	·	470 m	MPC · JPL
831791	2009 WF_{126}	—	September 30, 2009	Mount Lemmon	Mount Lemmon Survey	·	2.6 km	MPC · JPL
831792	2009 WK_{127}	—	November 16, 2009	Kitt Peak	Spacewatch	·	3.9 km	MPC · JPL
831793	2009 WJ_{128}	—	November 20, 2009	Kitt Peak	Spacewatch	LIX	3.1 km	MPC · JPL
831794	2009 WJ_{129}	—	October 27, 2009	Kitt Peak	Spacewatch	·	500 m	MPC · JPL
831795	2009 WP_{129}	—	November 20, 2009	Mount Lemmon	Mount Lemmon Survey	MAS	480 m	MPC · JPL
831796	2009 WU_{135}	—	October 23, 2009	Mount Lemmon	Mount Lemmon Survey	·	980 m	MPC · JPL
831797	2009 WH_{136}	—	October 23, 2009	Mount Lemmon	Mount Lemmon Survey	·	2.5 km	MPC · JPL
831798	2009 WF_{147}	—	October 14, 2009	Mount Lemmon	Mount Lemmon Survey	L4	7.7 km	MPC · JPL
831799	2009 WY_{147}	—	September 19, 1998	Sacramento Peak	SDSS	·	1.3 km	MPC · JPL
831800	2009 WC_{150}	—	November 19, 2009	Mount Lemmon	Mount Lemmon Survey	·	1.2 km	MPC · JPL

== 831801–831900 ==
back to top

Designation			Discovery			Properties		Ref
Permanent	Provisional	Named after	Date	Site	Discoverer(s)	Category	Diam.	Ref
831801	2009 WO_{153}	—	November 19, 2009	Mount Lemmon	Mount Lemmon Survey	·	790 m	MPC · JPL
831802	2009 WO_{162}	—	November 21, 2009	Kitt Peak	Spacewatch	HYG	1.5 km	MPC · JPL
831803	2009 WD_{164}	—	November 21, 2009	Kitt Peak	Spacewatch	EOS	1.4 km	MPC · JPL
831804	2009 WG_{166}	—	November 21, 2009	Kitt Peak	Spacewatch	·	3.2 km	MPC · JPL
831805	2009 WP_{167}	—	November 10, 2009	Kitt Peak	Spacewatch	TIR	2.1 km	MPC · JPL
831806	2009 WK_{169}	—	September 19, 2009	Mount Lemmon	Mount Lemmon Survey	·	1.1 km	MPC · JPL
831807	2009 WX_{170}	—	November 11, 2009	Kitt Peak	Spacewatch	·	1.2 km	MPC · JPL
831808	2009 WV_{171}	—	October 26, 2009	Kitt Peak	Spacewatch	·	3.1 km	MPC · JPL
831809	2009 WJ_{172}	—	November 22, 2009	Mount Lemmon	Mount Lemmon Survey	EOS	1.3 km	MPC · JPL
831810	2009 WA_{173}	—	March 16, 2007	Mount Lemmon	Mount Lemmon Survey	ERI	1.1 km	MPC · JPL
831811	2009 WU_{173}	—	November 9, 2009	Mount Lemmon	Mount Lemmon Survey	·	2.6 km	MPC · JPL
831812	2009 WO_{175}	—	November 23, 2009	Kitt Peak	Spacewatch	·	3.2 km	MPC · JPL
831813	2009 WK_{177}	—	November 23, 2009	Kitt Peak	Spacewatch	·	3.3 km	MPC · JPL
831814	2009 WY_{177}	—	November 23, 2009	Mount Lemmon	Mount Lemmon Survey	·	1.2 km	MPC · JPL
831815	2009 WR_{178}	—	November 23, 2009	Mount Lemmon	Mount Lemmon Survey	·	670 m	MPC · JPL
831816	2009 WA_{179}	—	November 23, 2009	Kitt Peak	Spacewatch	·	2.3 km	MPC · JPL
831817	2009 WD_{185}	—	October 9, 2004	Kitt Peak	Spacewatch	·	2.6 km	MPC · JPL
831818	2009 WA_{188}	—	November 24, 2009	Mount Lemmon	Mount Lemmon Survey	NYS	880 m	MPC · JPL
831819	2009 WQ_{188}	—	October 22, 2009	Mount Lemmon	Mount Lemmon Survey	·	780 m	MPC · JPL
831820	2009 WX_{189}	—	November 24, 2009	Kitt Peak	Spacewatch	·	3.6 km	MPC · JPL
831821	2009 WB_{190}	—	November 24, 2009	Kitt Peak	Spacewatch	·	1.1 km	MPC · JPL
831822	2009 WN_{204}	—	October 26, 2009	Kitt Peak	Spacewatch	L4	11 km	MPC · JPL
831823	2009 WA_{205}	—	October 14, 2001	Sacramento Peak	SDSS	NYS	990 m	MPC · JPL
831824	2009 WM_{205}	—	October 26, 2009	Kitt Peak	Spacewatch	·	1.4 km	MPC · JPL
831825	2009 WW_{206}	—	November 17, 2009	Kitt Peak	Spacewatch	·	800 m	MPC · JPL
831826	2009 WE_{207}	—	October 22, 2009	Mount Lemmon	Mount Lemmon Survey	LIX	2.7 km	MPC · JPL
831827	2009 WZ_{207}	—	September 27, 2003	Kitt Peak	Spacewatch	·	2.0 km	MPC · JPL
831828	2009 WG_{214}	—	March 9, 2007	Kitt Peak	Spacewatch	MAS	620 m	MPC · JPL
831829	2009 WW_{217}	—	November 17, 2009	Catalina	CSS	TIR	2.3 km	MPC · JPL
831830	2009 WK_{220}	—	October 27, 2009	Kitt Peak	Spacewatch	TIR	2.1 km	MPC · JPL
831831	2009 WM_{222}	—	November 16, 2009	Mount Lemmon	Mount Lemmon Survey	·	2.2 km	MPC · JPL
831832	2009 WK_{224}	—	February 25, 2007	Mount Lemmon	Mount Lemmon Survey	NYS	630 m	MPC · JPL
831833	2009 WO_{227}	—	October 23, 2009	Kitt Peak	Spacewatch	·	2.0 km	MPC · JPL
831834	2009 WH_{228}	—	October 23, 2009	Mount Lemmon	Mount Lemmon Survey	·	1.7 km	MPC · JPL
831835	2009 WX_{234}	—	November 19, 2009	Kitt Peak	Spacewatch	·	2.4 km	MPC · JPL
831836	2009 WV_{235}	—	November 20, 2009	Mount Lemmon	Mount Lemmon Survey	·	1.6 km	MPC · JPL
831837	2009 WT_{236}	—	November 16, 2009	Kitt Peak	Spacewatch	·	2.7 km	MPC · JPL
831838	2009 WN_{243}	—	November 19, 2009	Kitt Peak	Spacewatch	·	780 m	MPC · JPL
831839	2009 WL_{245}	—	November 21, 2009	Kitt Peak	Spacewatch	·	940 m	MPC · JPL
831840	2009 WN_{247}	—	November 17, 2009	Catalina	CSS	THB	2.8 km	MPC · JPL
831841	2009 WY_{247}	—	November 16, 2009	Mount Lemmon	Mount Lemmon Survey	·	580 m	MPC · JPL
831842	2009 WX_{248}	—	November 18, 2009	Mount Lemmon	Mount Lemmon Survey	·	450 m	MPC · JPL
831843	2009 WF_{256}	—	November 11, 2009	Mount Lemmon	Mount Lemmon Survey	·	4.7 km	MPC · JPL
831844	2009 WU_{256}	—	September 20, 2003	Kitt Peak	Spacewatch	LIX	3.5 km	MPC · JPL
831845	2009 WT_{257}	—	November 26, 2009	Mount Lemmon	Mount Lemmon Survey	·	1.9 km	MPC · JPL
831846	2009 WS_{271}	—	February 28, 2012	Haleakala	Pan-STARRS 1	·	2.5 km	MPC · JPL
831847	2009 WH_{272}	—	November 19, 2009	Mount Lemmon	Mount Lemmon Survey	·	880 m	MPC · JPL
831848	2009 WR_{272}	—	November 11, 2009	Kitt Peak	Spacewatch	·	1.2 km	MPC · JPL
831849	2009 WB_{275}	—	January 19, 2015	Haleakala	Pan-STARRS 1	EUN	950 m	MPC · JPL
831850	2009 WS_{275}	—	November 22, 2009	Catalina	CSS	KON	1.8 km	MPC · JPL
831851	2009 WC_{276}	—	December 8, 2015	Mount Lemmon	Mount Lemmon Survey	HYG	2.1 km	MPC · JPL
831852	2009 WM_{277}	—	September 17, 2013	Mount Lemmon	Mount Lemmon Survey	·	700 m	MPC · JPL
831853	2009 WN_{277}	—	December 4, 2013	Haleakala	Pan-STARRS 1	·	870 m	MPC · JPL
831854	2009 WT_{277}	—	November 18, 2009	Kitt Peak	Spacewatch	·	510 m	MPC · JPL
831855	2009 WS_{279}	—	November 26, 2009	Mount Lemmon	Mount Lemmon Survey	·	860 m	MPC · JPL
831856	2009 WN_{280}	—	November 18, 2014	Mount Lemmon	Mount Lemmon Survey	EOS	1.4 km	MPC · JPL
831857	2009 WQ_{280}	—	October 17, 2017	Mount Lemmon	Mount Lemmon Survey	H	380 m	MPC · JPL
831858	2009 WY_{281}	—	November 22, 2009	Catalina	CSS	PHO	830 m	MPC · JPL
831859	2009 WF_{282}	—	November 21, 2009	Catalina	CSS	·	1.2 km	MPC · JPL
831860	2009 WG_{283}	—	December 31, 2013	Mount Lemmon	Mount Lemmon Survey	EUN	1.3 km	MPC · JPL
831861	2009 WK_{283}	—	May 19, 2018	Haleakala	Pan-STARRS 1	·	600 m	MPC · JPL
831862	2009 WY_{283}	—	August 27, 2014	Haleakala	Pan-STARRS 1	·	1.4 km	MPC · JPL
831863	2009 WB_{284}	—	October 7, 2013	Catalina	CSS	(1547)	1.3 km	MPC · JPL
831864	2009 WV_{284}	—	October 26, 2013	Mount Lemmon	Mount Lemmon Survey	·	1.1 km	MPC · JPL
831865	2009 WS_{285}	—	October 26, 2014	Mount Lemmon	Mount Lemmon Survey	·	1.3 km	MPC · JPL
831866	2009 WH_{286}	—	February 18, 2017	Haleakala	Pan-STARRS 1	·	2.7 km	MPC · JPL
831867	2009 WN_{290}	—	November 17, 2009	Mount Lemmon	Mount Lemmon Survey	·	1 km	MPC · JPL
831868	2009 WZ_{290}	—	November 27, 2009	Mount Lemmon	Mount Lemmon Survey	·	2.0 km	MPC · JPL
831869	2009 WK_{291}	—	November 25, 2009	Kitt Peak	Spacewatch	·	750 m	MPC · JPL
831870	2009 WN_{291}	—	November 20, 2009	Kitt Peak	Spacewatch	·	1.9 km	MPC · JPL
831871	2009 WG_{294}	—	November 16, 2009	Mount Lemmon	Mount Lemmon Survey	·	600 m	MPC · JPL
831872	2009 WT_{295}	—	November 17, 2009	Mount Lemmon	Mount Lemmon Survey	NYS	870 m	MPC · JPL
831873	2009 XO_{3}	—	November 22, 2009	Catalina	CSS	·	4.9 km	MPC · JPL
831874	2009 XW_{8}	—	December 12, 2009	Pingelly	D. Chestnov, A. Novichonok	·	2.5 km	MPC · JPL
831875	2009 XK_{9}	—	December 16, 2009	Mount Lemmon	Mount Lemmon Survey	·	2.0 km	MPC · JPL
831876	2009 XQ_{16}	—	December 15, 2009	Mount Lemmon	Mount Lemmon Survey	·	2.6 km	MPC · JPL
831877	2009 XS_{17}	—	December 15, 2009	Mount Lemmon	Mount Lemmon Survey	·	1.9 km	MPC · JPL
831878	2009 XL_{18}	—	December 15, 2009	Mount Lemmon	Mount Lemmon Survey	HNS	940 m	MPC · JPL
831879	2009 XX_{20}	—	December 15, 2009	Bergisch Gladbach	W. Bickel	·	1.9 km	MPC · JPL
831880	2009 XH_{23}	—	December 10, 2009	Socorro	LINEAR	EUP	3.0 km	MPC · JPL
831881	2009 XW_{27}	—	July 16, 2013	Haleakala	Pan-STARRS 1	EOS	1.3 km	MPC · JPL
831882	2009 XC_{28}	—	December 15, 2009	Mount Lemmon	Mount Lemmon Survey	·	1.3 km	MPC · JPL
831883	2009 XP_{28}	—	December 15, 2009	Mount Lemmon	Mount Lemmon Survey	·	990 m	MPC · JPL
831884	2009 XE_{29}	—	December 10, 2009	Mount Lemmon	Mount Lemmon Survey	·	900 m	MPC · JPL
831885	2009 XJ_{29}	—	December 11, 2009	Mount Lemmon	Mount Lemmon Survey	·	2.0 km	MPC · JPL
831886	2009 XF_{30}	—	December 10, 2009	Mount Lemmon	Mount Lemmon Survey	·	1.1 km	MPC · JPL
831887	2009 YF_{5}	—	December 17, 2009	Mount Lemmon	Mount Lemmon Survey	·	2.7 km	MPC · JPL
831888	2009 YW_{5}	—	December 17, 2009	Mount Lemmon	Mount Lemmon Survey	·	1.1 km	MPC · JPL
831889	2009 YH_{12}	—	December 18, 2009	Mount Lemmon	Mount Lemmon Survey	·	3.5 km	MPC · JPL
831890	2009 YF_{15}	—	December 18, 2009	Kitt Peak	Spacewatch	·	2.0 km	MPC · JPL
831891	2009 YO_{15}	—	September 30, 2009	Mount Lemmon	Mount Lemmon Survey	EUP	3.6 km	MPC · JPL
831892	2009 YB_{18}	—	December 19, 2009	Kitt Peak	Spacewatch	·	2.6 km	MPC · JPL
831893	2009 YM_{23}	—	December 19, 2009	Mount Lemmon	Mount Lemmon Survey	H	440 m	MPC · JPL
831894	2009 YS_{27}	—	November 25, 2009	Mount Lemmon	Mount Lemmon Survey	·	980 m	MPC · JPL
831895	2009 YW_{27}	—	November 27, 2014	Mount Lemmon	Mount Lemmon Survey	·	2.4 km	MPC · JPL
831896	2009 YY_{27}	—	November 27, 2013	Mount Lemmon	Mount Lemmon Survey	·	750 m	MPC · JPL
831897	2009 YU_{28}	—	December 17, 2009	Kitt Peak	Spacewatch	·	2.9 km	MPC · JPL
831898	2009 YC_{29}	—	December 19, 2009	Kitt Peak	Spacewatch	DOR	1.9 km	MPC · JPL
831899	2009 YO_{29}	—	December 19, 2009	Kitt Peak	Spacewatch	TIR	2.4 km	MPC · JPL
831900	2009 YD_{30}	—	December 19, 2009	Mount Lemmon	Mount Lemmon Survey	·	860 m	MPC · JPL

== 831901–832000 ==
back to top

Designation			Discovery			Properties		Ref
Permanent	Provisional	Named after	Date	Site	Discoverer(s)	Category	Diam.	Ref
831901	2009 YZ_{30}	—	December 17, 2009	Mount Lemmon	Mount Lemmon Survey	·	1.9 km	MPC · JPL
831902	2009 YC_{31}	—	October 12, 2014	Mount Lemmon	Mount Lemmon Survey	ELF	2.9 km	MPC · JPL
831903	2009 YT_{31}	—	December 17, 2009	Mount Lemmon	Mount Lemmon Survey	·	750 m	MPC · JPL
831904	2009 YA_{32}	—	December 17, 2009	Mount Lemmon	Mount Lemmon Survey	·	1 km	MPC · JPL
831905	2009 YF_{32}	—	December 18, 2009	Kitt Peak	Spacewatch	·	2.0 km	MPC · JPL
831906	2009 YX_{32}	—	December 16, 2009	Mount Lemmon	Mount Lemmon Survey	LIX	2.6 km	MPC · JPL
831907	2009 YR_{33}	—	December 20, 2009	Mount Lemmon	Mount Lemmon Survey	·	1.7 km	MPC · JPL
831908	2009 YL_{34}	—	December 18, 2009	Kitt Peak	Spacewatch	·	910 m	MPC · JPL
831909	2009 YO_{34}	—	December 17, 2009	Mount Lemmon	Mount Lemmon Survey	HNS	940 m	MPC · JPL
831910	2009 YQ_{34}	—	December 17, 2009	Mount Lemmon	Mount Lemmon Survey	·	910 m	MPC · JPL
831911	2010 AM	—	January 4, 2010	Kitt Peak	Spacewatch	·	4.6 km	MPC · JPL
831912	2010 AC_{2}	—	November 11, 2009	Mount Lemmon	Mount Lemmon Survey	THB	2.6 km	MPC · JPL
831913	2010 AG_{4}	—	January 4, 2010	Kitt Peak	Spacewatch	·	1.5 km	MPC · JPL
831914	2010 AK_{4}	—	January 10, 2006	Kitt Peak	Spacewatch	·	930 m	MPC · JPL
831915	2010 AT_{6}	—	January 6, 2010	Catalina	CSS	·	1.1 km	MPC · JPL
831916	2010 AX_{7}	—	September 23, 2008	Kitt Peak	Spacewatch	·	2.4 km	MPC · JPL
831917	2010 AB_{10}	—	November 19, 2009	Mount Lemmon	Mount Lemmon Survey	·	5.4 km	MPC · JPL
831918	2010 AV_{10}	—	September 13, 2004	Kitt Peak	Spacewatch	·	1.0 km	MPC · JPL
831919	2010 AU_{14}	—	October 29, 2005	Mount Lemmon	Mount Lemmon Survey	·	760 m	MPC · JPL
831920	2010 AC_{18}	—	January 7, 2010	Mount Lemmon	Mount Lemmon Survey	THM	2.0 km	MPC · JPL
831921	2010 AT_{20}	—	December 15, 2009	Mount Lemmon	Mount Lemmon Survey	·	1.5 km	MPC · JPL
831922	2010 AT_{23}	—	December 2, 2005	Kitt Peak	L. H. Wasserman, R. L. Millis	·	2.3 km	MPC · JPL
831923	2010 AZ_{25}	—	January 6, 2010	Kitt Peak	Spacewatch	·	2.2 km	MPC · JPL
831924	2010 AO_{26}	—	December 19, 2009	Mount Lemmon	Mount Lemmon Survey	EUN	810 m	MPC · JPL
831925	2010 AJ_{27}	—	January 6, 2010	Kitt Peak	Spacewatch	·	3.2 km	MPC · JPL
831926	2010 AD_{28}	—	January 7, 2010	Mount Lemmon	Mount Lemmon Survey	·	970 m	MPC · JPL
831927	2010 AX_{32}	—	January 7, 2010	Kitt Peak	Spacewatch	·	1.9 km	MPC · JPL
831928	2010 AA_{40}	—	January 6, 2010	Mount Lemmon	Mount Lemmon Survey	PHO	870 m	MPC · JPL
831929	2010 AT_{40}	—	January 5, 2010	Kitt Peak	Spacewatch	·	1.1 km	MPC · JPL
831930	2010 AJ_{45}	—	January 7, 2010	Mount Lemmon	Mount Lemmon Survey	·	780 m	MPC · JPL
831931	2010 AW_{45}	—	January 7, 2010	Mount Lemmon	Mount Lemmon Survey	TIR	1.7 km	MPC · JPL
831932	2010 AA_{47}	—	January 8, 2010	Kitt Peak	Spacewatch	·	2.9 km	MPC · JPL
831933	2010 AO_{48}	—	January 8, 2010	Kitt Peak	Spacewatch	·	2.0 km	MPC · JPL
831934	2010 AD_{53}	—	March 23, 2006	Mount Lemmon	Mount Lemmon Survey	·	1.0 km	MPC · JPL
831935	2010 AW_{55}	—	January 8, 2010	Kitt Peak	Spacewatch	·	890 m	MPC · JPL
831936	2010 AV_{61}	—	November 21, 2009	Mount Lemmon	Mount Lemmon Survey	·	1.7 km	MPC · JPL
831937	2010 AC_{69}	—	December 15, 2009	Mount Lemmon	Mount Lemmon Survey	·	2.5 km	MPC · JPL
831938	2010 AQ_{75}	—	November 20, 2009	Mount Lemmon	Mount Lemmon Survey	·	1.5 km	MPC · JPL
831939	2010 AW_{75}	—	January 7, 2010	Catalina	CSS	T_{j} (2.94)	2.7 km	MPC · JPL
831940	2010 AS_{77}	—	December 15, 2009	Mount Lemmon	Mount Lemmon Survey	·	330 m	MPC · JPL
831941	2010 AG_{78}	—	January 7, 2010	Catalina	CSS	PHO	1.7 km	MPC · JPL
831942	2010 AT_{78}	—	November 21, 2009	Mount Lemmon	Mount Lemmon Survey	·	2.3 km	MPC · JPL
831943	2010 AX_{81}	—	January 7, 2010	WISE	WISE	·	1.4 km	MPC · JPL
831944	2010 AP_{83}	—	January 7, 2010	WISE	WISE	(895)	2.6 km	MPC · JPL
831945	2010 AG_{85}	—	January 7, 2010	WISE	WISE	·	2.5 km	MPC · JPL
831946	2010 AB_{86}	—	May 12, 2010	Mount Lemmon	Mount Lemmon Survey	T_{j} (2.97) · 3:2	5.7 km	MPC · JPL
831947	2010 AH_{86}	—	January 8, 2010	WISE	WISE	·	2.4 km	MPC · JPL
831948	2010 AK_{86}	—	January 8, 2010	WISE	WISE	·	4.6 km	MPC · JPL
831949	2010 AT_{86}	—	January 8, 2010	WISE	WISE	ULA	3.3 km	MPC · JPL
831950	2010 AX_{88}	—	January 8, 2010	WISE	WISE	·	3.6 km	MPC · JPL
831951	2010 AY_{88}	—	January 8, 2010	WISE	WISE	·	2.2 km	MPC · JPL
831952	2010 AF_{90}	—	January 15, 2004	Kitt Peak	Spacewatch	T_{j} (2.99)	2.1 km	MPC · JPL
831953	2010 AJ_{90}	—	January 8, 2010	WISE	WISE	·	1.9 km	MPC · JPL
831954	2010 AW_{90}	—	January 8, 2010	WISE	WISE	·	4.3 km	MPC · JPL
831955	2010 AZ_{90}	—	January 8, 2010	WISE	WISE	·	4.2 km	MPC · JPL
831956	2010 AF_{91}	—	November 30, 2005	Kitt Peak	Spacewatch	·	2.2 km	MPC · JPL
831957	2010 AL_{91}	—	January 8, 2010	WISE	WISE	·	3.0 km	MPC · JPL
831958	2010 AQ_{91}	—	December 21, 2003	Sacramento Peak	SDSS	·	3.0 km	MPC · JPL
831959	2010 AT_{91}	—	February 11, 2004	Palomar	NEAT	EUP	3.1 km	MPC · JPL
831960	2010 AE_{92}	—	January 8, 2010	WISE	WISE	·	2.2 km	MPC · JPL
831961	2010 AX_{92}	—	July 3, 2003	Kitt Peak	Spacewatch	·	3.1 km	MPC · JPL
831962	2010 AE_{93}	—	January 8, 2010	WISE	WISE	·	2.5 km	MPC · JPL
831963	2010 AZ_{93}	—	January 8, 2010	WISE	WISE	·	2.3 km	MPC · JPL
831964	2010 AA_{94}	—	October 2, 2009	Mount Lemmon	Mount Lemmon Survey	·	2.3 km	MPC · JPL
831965	2010 AO_{94}	—	March 15, 2010	Siding Spring	SSS	·	2.6 km	MPC · JPL
831966	2010 AR_{94}	—	December 1, 2008	Mount Lemmon	Mount Lemmon Survey	·	1.3 km	MPC · JPL
831967	2010 AG_{95}	—	January 8, 2010	WISE	WISE	·	3.7 km	MPC · JPL
831968	2010 AN_{95}	—	December 29, 2014	Haleakala	Pan-STARRS 1	·	1.4 km	MPC · JPL
831969	2010 AC_{96}	—	September 30, 2009	Mount Lemmon	Mount Lemmon Survey	LIX	3.0 km	MPC · JPL
831970	2010 AU_{96}	—	January 9, 2010	WISE	WISE	·	3.8 km	MPC · JPL
831971	2010 AW_{96}	—	June 8, 2005	Kitt Peak	Spacewatch	EUP	3.2 km	MPC · JPL
831972	2010 AD_{97}	—	September 30, 2009	Mount Lemmon	Mount Lemmon Survey	·	1.9 km	MPC · JPL
831973	2010 AJ_{97}	—	September 26, 2009	Catalina	CSS	(895)	4.7 km	MPC · JPL
831974	2010 AX_{97}	—	July 26, 2014	Haleakala	Pan-STARRS 1	·	2.9 km	MPC · JPL
831975	2010 AB_{98}	—	January 10, 2010	WISE	WISE	·	2.8 km	MPC · JPL
831976	2010 AH_{98}	—	December 29, 2014	Haleakala	Pan-STARRS 1	·	3.2 km	MPC · JPL
831977	2010 AR_{99}	—	August 3, 2014	Haleakala	Pan-STARRS 1	EUP	1.9 km	MPC · JPL
831978	2010 AU_{102}	—	January 12, 2010	WISE	WISE	·	1.9 km	MPC · JPL
831979	2010 AY_{102}	—	September 16, 2009	Kitt Peak	Spacewatch	·	2.9 km	MPC · JPL
831980	2010 AA_{103}	—	January 12, 2010	WISE	WISE	L4	9.2 km	MPC · JPL
831981	2010 AU_{103}	—	January 12, 2010	WISE	WISE	·	3.4 km	MPC · JPL
831982	2010 AJ_{104}	—	January 12, 2010	WISE	WISE	·	2.6 km	MPC · JPL
831983	2010 AB_{105}	—	October 27, 2009	Mount Lemmon	Mount Lemmon Survey	DOR	1.5 km	MPC · JPL
831984	2010 AE_{105}	—	January 12, 2010	WISE	WISE	·	2.0 km	MPC · JPL
831985	2010 AH_{106}	—	January 12, 2010	WISE	WISE	·	3.4 km	MPC · JPL
831986	2010 AE_{107}	—	September 30, 2009	Mount Lemmon	Mount Lemmon Survey	·	2.0 km	MPC · JPL
831987	2010 AS_{108}	—	September 30, 2009	Mount Lemmon	Mount Lemmon Survey	·	2.0 km	MPC · JPL
831988	2010 AB_{109}	—	January 12, 2010	WISE	WISE	·	1.4 km	MPC · JPL
831989	2010 AS_{109}	—	January 12, 2010	WISE	WISE	·	2.4 km	MPC · JPL
831990	2010 AG_{110}	—	April 14, 2010	Catalina	CSS	·	2.4 km	MPC · JPL
831991	2010 AH_{110}	—	January 12, 2010	WISE	WISE	·	1.8 km	MPC · JPL
831992	2010 AN_{110}	—	January 12, 2010	WISE	WISE	·	4.3 km	MPC · JPL
831993	2010 AY_{110}	—	April 15, 2010	Mount Lemmon	Mount Lemmon Survey	LIX	2.6 km	MPC · JPL
831994	2010 AK_{111}	—	January 13, 2010	WISE	WISE	T_{j} (2.99)	2.2 km	MPC · JPL
831995	2010 AX_{111}	—	October 14, 2009	Kitt Peak	Spacewatch	DOR	1.6 km	MPC · JPL
831996	2010 AL_{112}	—	September 30, 2009	Mount Lemmon	Mount Lemmon Survey	·	4.6 km	MPC · JPL
831997	2010 AP_{112}	—	January 13, 2010	WISE	WISE	·	1.9 km	MPC · JPL
831998	2010 AQ_{113}	—	October 2, 2009	Mount Lemmon	Mount Lemmon Survey	·	2.6 km	MPC · JPL
831999	2010 AR_{113}	—	October 21, 2009	Catalina	CSS	·	2.0 km	MPC · JPL
832000	2010 AU_{114}	—	October 17, 2009	Mount Lemmon	Mount Lemmon Survey	·	3.3 km	MPC · JPL

back to top
