= List of minor planets: 839001–840000 =

The following is a partial list of minor planets, running from minor-planet number 839001 through 840000, inclusive. The primary data for this and other partial lists is based on JPL's "Small-Body Orbital Elements" and data available from the Minor Planet Center. Critical list information is also provided by the MPC, unless otherwise specified from Lowell Observatory. A detailed description of the table's columns and additional sources are given on the main page including a complete list of every page in this series, and a statistical break-up on the dynamical classification of minor planets.

Also see the summary list of all named bodies in numerical and alphabetical order, and the corresponding naming citations for the number range of this particular list. New namings may only be added to this list after official publication, as the preannouncement of names is condemned by the Working Group for Small Bodies Nomenclature of the International Astronomical Union.

Near-Earth obj.	MBA (inner)	MBA (outer)	Centaur
Mars-crosser	MBA (middle)	Jupiter trojan	Trans-Neptunian obj.
Unclassified

== 839001–839100 ==
Designation			Discovery			Properties		Ref
Permanent	Provisional	Named after	Date	Site	Discoverer(s)	Category	Diam.	Ref
839001	2014 OC_{302}	—	July 25, 2014	Haleakala	Pan-STARRS 1	·	1.8 km	MPC · JPL
839002	2014 OC_{303}	—	September 18, 2009	Mount Lemmon	Mount Lemmon Survey	THM	1.5 km	MPC · JPL
839003	2014 OH_{303}	—	July 25, 2014	Haleakala	Pan-STARRS 1	·	1.7 km	MPC · JPL
839004	2014 OK_{303}	—	July 25, 2014	Haleakala	Pan-STARRS 1	(5)	750 m	MPC · JPL
839005	2014 ON_{304}	—	July 25, 2014	Haleakala	Pan-STARRS 1	·	1.7 km	MPC · JPL
839006	2014 OY_{306}	—	January 4, 2013	Kitt Peak	Spacewatch	·	630 m	MPC · JPL
839007	2014 ON_{308}	—	July 27, 2014	Haleakala	Pan-STARRS 1	EOS	1.2 km	MPC · JPL
839008	2014 OO_{308}	—	July 27, 2014	Haleakala	Pan-STARRS 1	·	2.2 km	MPC · JPL
839009	2014 OH_{310}	—	September 28, 2009	Kitt Peak	Spacewatch	·	1.5 km	MPC · JPL
839010	2014 OA_{311}	—	July 3, 2014	Haleakala	Pan-STARRS 1	·	1.9 km	MPC · JPL
839011	2014 OV_{313}	—	January 27, 2012	Mount Lemmon	Mount Lemmon Survey	·	2.1 km	MPC · JPL
839012	2014 OW_{316}	—	April 12, 2010	WISE	WISE	·	1.6 km	MPC · JPL
839013	2014 OG_{317}	—	July 28, 2014	Haleakala	Pan-STARRS 1	·	440 m	MPC · JPL
839014	2014 OL_{321}	—	July 29, 2014	Haleakala	Pan-STARRS 1	·	1.8 km	MPC · JPL
839015	2014 OE_{322}	—	July 29, 2014	Haleakala	Pan-STARRS 1	·	1.9 km	MPC · JPL
839016	2014 OY_{324}	—	July 17, 2010	WISE	WISE	·	1.6 km	MPC · JPL
839017	2014 OD_{325}	—	July 29, 2014	Haleakala	Pan-STARRS 1	·	1.6 km	MPC · JPL
839018	2014 OY_{326}	—	June 27, 2014	Haleakala	Pan-STARRS 1	EOS	1.6 km	MPC · JPL
839019	2014 OO_{327}	—	January 7, 2006	Kitt Peak	Spacewatch	·	520 m	MPC · JPL
839020	2014 OM_{338}	—	July 25, 2014	Haleakala	Pan-STARRS 1	H	320 m	MPC · JPL
839021	2014 OG_{339}	—	September 26, 2001	Anderson Mesa	LONEOS	·	1.7 km	MPC · JPL
839022	2014 OG_{340}	—	July 28, 2014	Haleakala	Pan-STARRS 1	·	1.9 km	MPC · JPL
839023	2014 OW_{341}	—	July 28, 2014	Haleakala	Pan-STARRS 1	·	850 m	MPC · JPL
839024	2014 OK_{343}	—	December 19, 2004	Kitt Peak	Spacewatch	·	620 m	MPC · JPL
839025	2014 OJ_{344}	—	June 29, 2014	Haleakala	Pan-STARRS 1	·	840 m	MPC · JPL
839026	2014 OC_{345}	—	June 24, 2014	Mount Lemmon	Mount Lemmon Survey	·	610 m	MPC · JPL
839027	2014 OM_{345}	—	April 7, 2013	Palomar	Palomar Transient Factory	·	1.9 km	MPC · JPL
839028	2014 OO_{345}	—	July 25, 2014	Haleakala	Pan-STARRS 1	·	1.8 km	MPC · JPL
839029	2014 OR_{348}	—	August 27, 2009	Kitt Peak	Spacewatch	·	1.6 km	MPC · JPL
839030	2014 OM_{350}	—	July 28, 2014	Haleakala	Pan-STARRS 1	·	2.1 km	MPC · JPL
839031	2014 OA_{351}	—	June 3, 2008	Kitt Peak	Spacewatch	·	1.9 km	MPC · JPL
839032	2014 OX_{351}	—	January 10, 2006	Mount Lemmon	Mount Lemmon Survey	EOS	1.2 km	MPC · JPL
839033	2014 OA_{354}	—	November 7, 2010	Mount Lemmon	Mount Lemmon Survey	·	2.1 km	MPC · JPL
839034	2014 OD_{354}	—	July 4, 2014	Haleakala	Pan-STARRS 1	·	1.9 km	MPC · JPL
839035	2014 OZ_{354}	—	July 7, 2014	Haleakala	Pan-STARRS 1	NYS	830 m	MPC · JPL
839036	2014 OH_{356}	—	July 28, 2014	Haleakala	Pan-STARRS 1	·	1.6 km	MPC · JPL
839037	2014 OC_{359}	—	August 31, 2005	Kitt Peak	Spacewatch	·	1.1 km	MPC · JPL
839038	2014 OA_{360}	—	August 28, 2003	Palomar	NEAT	TIR	2.2 km	MPC · JPL
839039	2014 OK_{361}	—	May 31, 2014	Haleakala	Pan-STARRS 1	·	1.6 km	MPC · JPL
839040	2014 ON_{366}	—	September 25, 2009	Catalina	CSS	·	2.6 km	MPC · JPL
839041	2014 OF_{367}	—	January 29, 2011	Mount Lemmon	Mount Lemmon Survey	TIR	1.5 km	MPC · JPL
839042	2014 OB_{369}	—	December 25, 2005	Kitt Peak	Spacewatch	·	2.2 km	MPC · JPL
839043	2014 OX_{377}	—	July 27, 2010	WISE	WISE	ADE	2.3 km	MPC · JPL
839044	2014 OH_{379}	—	June 21, 2014	Haleakala	Pan-STARRS 1	MAS	490 m	MPC · JPL
839045	2014 ON_{379}	—	August 6, 2010	WISE	WISE	·	1.6 km	MPC · JPL
839046	2014 OD_{381}	—	January 7, 2010	WISE	WISE	·	2.0 km	MPC · JPL
839047	2014 OU_{382}	—	June 27, 2014	Haleakala	Pan-STARRS 1	·	1.5 km	MPC · JPL
839048	2014 OP_{383}	—	November 18, 1998	Roque de los Muchachos	A. Fitzsimmons	·	430 m	MPC · JPL
839049	2014 OR_{384}	—	July 14, 2010	WISE	WISE	ADE	1.6 km	MPC · JPL
839050	2014 OG_{395}	—	October 20, 2007	Mount Lemmon	Mount Lemmon Survey	T_{j} (2.99) · 3:2	2.6 km	MPC · JPL
839051	2014 OU_{395}	—	January 8, 2010	WISE	WISE	·	2.4 km	MPC · JPL
839052	2014 ON_{396}	—	July 25, 2014	Haleakala	Pan-STARRS 1	·	1.8 km	MPC · JPL
839053	2014 OZ_{399}	—	July 31, 2014	Haleakala	Pan-STARRS 1	·	1.6 km	MPC · JPL
839054	2014 OB_{400}	—	July 25, 2014	Haleakala	Pan-STARRS 1	(5)	880 m	MPC · JPL
839055	2014 OZ_{402}	—	October 11, 2009	Mount Lemmon	Mount Lemmon Survey	THM	1.6 km	MPC · JPL
839056	2014 OE_{403}	—	July 30, 2014	Kitt Peak	Spacewatch	·	1.8 km	MPC · JPL
839057	2014 OR_{403}	—	July 25, 2014	Haleakala	Pan-STARRS 1	·	1.9 km	MPC · JPL
839058	2014 OY_{403}	—	July 28, 2014	Haleakala	Pan-STARRS 1	·	1.8 km	MPC · JPL
839059	2014 OA_{404}	—	February 8, 2011	Mount Lemmon	Mount Lemmon Survey	·	2.1 km	MPC · JPL
839060	2014 OQ_{404}	—	July 30, 2014	Kitt Peak	Spacewatch	·	2.2 km	MPC · JPL
839061	2014 OR_{404}	—	July 30, 2014	Kitt Peak	Spacewatch	THM	1.5 km	MPC · JPL
839062	2014 OA_{405}	—	July 25, 2014	ESA OGS	ESA OGS	·	750 m	MPC · JPL
839063	2014 OD_{405}	—	January 20, 2009	Mount Lemmon	Mount Lemmon Survey	·	820 m	MPC · JPL
839064	2014 ON_{406}	—	July 25, 2014	Haleakala	Pan-STARRS 1	·	790 m	MPC · JPL
839065	2014 ON_{407}	—	July 25, 2014	Haleakala	Pan-STARRS 1	EOS	1.4 km	MPC · JPL
839066	2014 OU_{408}	—	July 25, 2014	Haleakala	Pan-STARRS 1	·	2.2 km	MPC · JPL
839067	2014 OD_{409}	—	September 30, 2009	Mount Lemmon	Mount Lemmon Survey	·	1.7 km	MPC · JPL
839068	2014 OH_{409}	—	July 25, 2014	Haleakala	Pan-STARRS 1	KOR	1.0 km	MPC · JPL
839069	2014 OQ_{409}	—	April 13, 2013	Haleakala	Pan-STARRS 1	THM	1.6 km	MPC · JPL
839070	2014 OL_{411}	—	September 15, 2009	Kitt Peak	Spacewatch	THM	1.5 km	MPC · JPL
839071	2014 ON_{411}	—	October 18, 2009	Mount Lemmon	Mount Lemmon Survey	THM	1.6 km	MPC · JPL
839072	2014 OW_{412}	—	January 21, 2013	Haleakala	Pan-STARRS 1	·	1.5 km	MPC · JPL
839073	2014 OG_{413}	—	September 17, 2009	Kitt Peak	Spacewatch	·	1.9 km	MPC · JPL
839074	2014 OT_{413}	—	July 30, 2014	Haleakala	Pan-STARRS 1	·	1.8 km	MPC · JPL
839075	2014 OM_{415}	—	July 29, 2014	Haleakala	Pan-STARRS 1	·	2.2 km	MPC · JPL
839076	2014 OQ_{416}	—	July 29, 2014	Haleakala	Pan-STARRS 1	·	2.4 km	MPC · JPL
839077	2014 OA_{418}	—	July 25, 2014	Haleakala	Pan-STARRS 1	·	2.2 km	MPC · JPL
839078	2014 OL_{418}	—	July 31, 2014	Haleakala	Pan-STARRS 1	TIR	2.0 km	MPC · JPL
839079	2014 OK_{426}	—	July 26, 2014	Haleakala	Pan-STARRS 1	·	2.1 km	MPC · JPL
839080	2014 ON_{433}	—	July 25, 2014	Haleakala	Pan-STARRS 1	·	1.8 km	MPC · JPL
839081	2014 OY_{434}	—	July 28, 2014	Haleakala	Pan-STARRS 1	·	2.0 km	MPC · JPL
839082	2014 OG_{437}	—	July 26, 2014	Haleakala	Pan-STARRS 1	EOS	1.2 km	MPC · JPL
839083	2014 OU_{437}	—	July 25, 2014	Haleakala	Pan-STARRS 1	·	1.9 km	MPC · JPL
839084	2014 OC_{438}	—	July 28, 2014	Haleakala	Pan-STARRS 1	·	2.4 km	MPC · JPL
839085	2014 OM_{439}	—	July 28, 2014	Haleakala	Pan-STARRS 1	·	2.3 km	MPC · JPL
839086	2014 OV_{439}	—	July 25, 2014	Haleakala	Pan-STARRS 1	·	2.1 km	MPC · JPL
839087	2014 OA_{440}	—	July 25, 2014	Haleakala	Pan-STARRS 1	EOS	1.4 km	MPC · JPL
839088	2014 OP_{440}	—	July 27, 2014	Haleakala	Pan-STARRS 1	LIX	2.4 km	MPC · JPL
839089	2014 OR_{440}	—	July 30, 2014	Haleakala	Pan-STARRS 1	·	1.9 km	MPC · JPL
839090	2014 OW_{441}	—	July 31, 2014	Haleakala	Pan-STARRS 1	critical	1.8 km	MPC · JPL
839091	2014 OB_{442}	—	July 25, 2014	Haleakala	Pan-STARRS 1	·	1.9 km	MPC · JPL
839092	2014 OD_{442}	—	July 28, 2014	Haleakala	Pan-STARRS 1	·	1.9 km	MPC · JPL
839093	2014 OC_{443}	—	July 29, 2014	Haleakala	Pan-STARRS 1	·	1.9 km	MPC · JPL
839094	2014 OO_{445}	—	July 29, 2014	Haleakala	Pan-STARRS 1	EOS	1.4 km	MPC · JPL
839095	2014 OK_{446}	—	July 25, 2014	Haleakala	Pan-STARRS 1	·	1.9 km	MPC · JPL
839096	2014 OP_{446}	—	July 27, 2014	Haleakala	Pan-STARRS 1	·	2.2 km	MPC · JPL
839097	2014 ON_{452}	—	July 30, 2014	Haleakala	Pan-STARRS 1	·	690 m	MPC · JPL
839098	2014 OE_{453}	—	July 28, 2014	Haleakala	Pan-STARRS 1	·	1.2 km	MPC · JPL
839099	2014 OD_{455}	—	July 29, 2014	Haleakala	Pan-STARRS 1	·	1.8 km	MPC · JPL
839100	2014 OM_{455}	—	July 25, 2014	Haleakala	Pan-STARRS 1	3:2	3.7 km	MPC · JPL

== 839101–839200 ==
back to top

Designation			Discovery			Properties		Ref
Permanent	Provisional	Named after	Date	Site	Discoverer(s)	Category	Diam.	Ref
839101	2014 OA_{481}	—	July 30, 2014	Haleakala	Pan-STARRS 1	HYG	1.8 km	MPC · JPL
839102	2014 OP_{481}	—	July 28, 2014	Haleakala	Pan-STARRS 1	·	2.0 km	MPC · JPL
839103	2014 OR_{481}	—	July 30, 2014	Haleakala	Pan-STARRS 1	EOS	1.4 km	MPC · JPL
839104	2014 OY_{481}	—	March 6, 2013	Haleakala	Pan-STARRS 1	·	1.1 km	MPC · JPL
839105	2014 OG_{483}	—	July 28, 2014	Haleakala	Pan-STARRS 1	THM	1.7 km	MPC · JPL
839106	2014 OK_{489}	—	July 29, 2014	Haleakala	Pan-STARRS 1	·	1.2 km	MPC · JPL
839107	2014 PL_{1}	—	July 3, 2014	Haleakala	Pan-STARRS 1	critical	2.0 km	MPC · JPL
839108	2014 PV_{4}	—	November 3, 2004	Kitt Peak	Spacewatch	·	1.4 km	MPC · JPL
839109	2014 PR_{7}	—	January 11, 2011	Kitt Peak	Spacewatch	·	2.3 km	MPC · JPL
839110	2014 PK_{11}	—	August 4, 2014	Haleakala	Pan-STARRS 1	·	1.8 km	MPC · JPL
839111	2014 PN_{11}	—	August 4, 2014	Haleakala	Pan-STARRS 1	·	1.8 km	MPC · JPL
839112	2014 PP_{11}	—	January 10, 2011	Mount Lemmon	Mount Lemmon Survey	·	2.2 km	MPC · JPL
839113	2014 PS_{11}	—	October 14, 2007	Kitt Peak	Spacewatch	·	850 m	MPC · JPL
839114	2014 PB_{14}	—	August 4, 2014	Haleakala	Pan-STARRS 1	·	2.1 km	MPC · JPL
839115	2014 PK_{15}	—	September 24, 2009	Kitt Peak	Spacewatch	·	1.6 km	MPC · JPL
839116	2014 PV_{15}	—	January 16, 2005	Mauna Kea	P. A. Wiegert, D. D. Balam	·	690 m	MPC · JPL
839117	2014 PK_{16}	—	July 25, 2014	Haleakala	Pan-STARRS 1	·	610 m	MPC · JPL
839118	2014 PA_{17}	—	August 16, 2009	Kitt Peak	Spacewatch	·	1.6 km	MPC · JPL
839119	2014 PF_{19}	—	January 8, 2011	Mount Lemmon	Mount Lemmon Survey	·	2.0 km	MPC · JPL
839120	2014 PY_{19}	—	July 25, 2014	Haleakala	Pan-STARRS 1	EOS	1.4 km	MPC · JPL
839121	2014 PM_{21}	—	July 25, 2014	Haleakala	Pan-STARRS 1	·	2.0 km	MPC · JPL
839122	2014 PO_{23}	—	June 6, 2014	Roque de los Muchachos	EURONEAR	·	950 m	MPC · JPL
839123	2014 PT_{24}	—	October 5, 2004	Kitt Peak	Spacewatch	·	550 m	MPC · JPL
839124	2014 PF_{26}	—	September 19, 2009	Kitt Peak	Spacewatch	·	1.7 km	MPC · JPL
839125	2014 PP_{29}	—	July 29, 2014	ESA OGS	ESA OGS	·	800 m	MPC · JPL
839126	2014 PR_{29}	—	July 25, 2014	Haleakala	Pan-STARRS 1	·	840 m	MPC · JPL
839127	2014 PG_{30}	—	October 11, 2004	Kitt Peak	Spacewatch	·	430 m	MPC · JPL
839128	2014 PX_{30}	—	October 10, 2007	Mount Lemmon	Mount Lemmon Survey	3:2	3.4 km	MPC · JPL
839129	2014 PG_{31}	—	July 26, 2014	Haleakala	Pan-STARRS 1	·	2.2 km	MPC · JPL
839130	2014 PX_{32}	—	September 19, 2003	Kitt Peak	Spacewatch	·	2.2 km	MPC · JPL
839131	2014 PM_{36}	—	June 6, 2014	Roque de los Muchachos	EURONEAR	·	2.0 km	MPC · JPL
839132	2014 PQ_{38}	—	August 4, 2014	Haleakala	Pan-STARRS 1	TIR	2.3 km	MPC · JPL
839133	2014 PZ_{38}	—	July 7, 2014	Haleakala	Pan-STARRS 1	·	2.4 km	MPC · JPL
839134	2014 PC_{39}	—	July 7, 2014	Haleakala	Pan-STARRS 1	·	2.1 km	MPC · JPL
839135	2014 PX_{41}	—	January 22, 2010	WISE	WISE	·	2.5 km	MPC · JPL
839136	2014 PV_{42}	—	July 28, 2014	Haleakala	Pan-STARRS 1	·	550 m	MPC · JPL
839137	2014 PB_{44}	—	December 10, 2009	Mount Lemmon	Mount Lemmon Survey	TIR	1.8 km	MPC · JPL
839138	2014 PH_{44}	—	March 16, 2010	WISE	WISE	T_{j} (2.98) · EUP	3.0 km	MPC · JPL
839139	2014 PR_{44}	—	July 3, 2014	Haleakala	Pan-STARRS 1	·	2.1 km	MPC · JPL
839140	2014 PO_{45}	—	March 20, 1999	Sacramento Peak	SDSS	·	800 m	MPC · JPL
839141	2014 PA_{46}	—	January 30, 2010	WISE	WISE	EUP	3.3 km	MPC · JPL
839142	2014 PD_{48}	—	June 23, 2014	Mount Lemmon	Mount Lemmon Survey	NYS	770 m	MPC · JPL
839143	2014 PV_{48}	—	November 7, 2007	Kitt Peak	Spacewatch	MAS	580 m	MPC · JPL
839144	2014 PH_{49}	—	November 21, 2003	Palomar	NEAT	T_{j} (2.97)	3.8 km	MPC · JPL
839145	2014 PQ_{51}	—	July 26, 2014	Haleakala	Pan-STARRS 1	critical	1.3 km	MPC · JPL
839146	2014 PV_{54}	—	July 7, 2014	Haleakala	Pan-STARRS 1	·	1.9 km	MPC · JPL
839147	2014 PA_{56}	—	October 13, 2007	Mount Lemmon	Mount Lemmon Survey	·	780 m	MPC · JPL
839148	2014 PR_{58}	—	December 31, 2011	Kitt Peak	Spacewatch	·	730 m	MPC · JPL
839149	2014 PF_{59}	—	August 3, 2014	Haleakala	Pan-STARRS 1	·	390 m	MPC · JPL
839150	2014 PL_{59}	—	August 6, 2014	Haleakala	Pan-STARRS 1	·	1.7 km	MPC · JPL
839151	2014 PN_{59}	—	August 10, 2014	WISE	WISE	T_{j} (2.96)	2.6 km	MPC · JPL
839152	2014 PY_{59}	—	May 12, 2013	Haleakala	Pan-STARRS 1	·	2.5 km	MPC · JPL
839153	2014 PH_{60}	—	April 2, 2010	WISE	WISE	·	2.2 km	MPC · JPL
839154	2014 PT_{61}	—	July 19, 2010	WISE	WISE	·	2.0 km	MPC · JPL
839155	2014 PJ_{65}	—	July 27, 2014	ESA OGS	ESA OGS	·	480 m	MPC · JPL
839156	2014 PM_{66}	—	July 28, 2014	Haleakala	Pan-STARRS 1	AEO	850 m	MPC · JPL
839157	2014 PL_{67}	—	July 25, 2014	Haleakala	Pan-STARRS 1	·	2.0 km	MPC · JPL
839158	2014 PE_{68}	—	August 15, 2014	Haleakala	Pan-STARRS 1	H	380 m	MPC · JPL
839159	2014 PR_{68}	—	January 8, 2007	Mount Lemmon	Mount Lemmon Survey	·	1.4 km	MPC · JPL
839160	2014 PE_{75}	—	August 3, 2014	Haleakala	Pan-STARRS 1	·	2.0 km	MPC · JPL
839161	2014 PT_{75}	—	October 12, 2010	Kitt Peak	Spacewatch	·	1.0 km	MPC · JPL
839162	2014 PC_{76}	—	March 5, 2013	Haleakala	Pan-STARRS 1	·	1.8 km	MPC · JPL
839163	2014 PN_{76}	—	August 3, 2014	Haleakala	Pan-STARRS 1	·	1.5 km	MPC · JPL
839164	2014 PW_{76}	—	November 6, 2010	Mount Lemmon	Mount Lemmon Survey	·	950 m	MPC · JPL
839165	2014 PO_{77}	—	March 16, 2013	Kitt Peak	Spacewatch	·	1.3 km	MPC · JPL
839166	2014 PP_{78}	—	October 8, 2007	Mount Lemmon	Mount Lemmon Survey	·	730 m	MPC · JPL
839167	2014 PM_{81}	—	September 10, 2010	Mount Lemmon	Mount Lemmon Survey	ADE	1.5 km	MPC · JPL
839168	2014 PY_{81}	—	September 28, 2009	Mount Lemmon	Mount Lemmon Survey	·	1.7 km	MPC · JPL
839169	2014 PF_{83}	—	December 16, 2009	Kitt Peak	Spacewatch	·	2.0 km	MPC · JPL
839170	2014 PK_{83}	—	August 15, 2014	Haleakala	Pan-STARRS 1	EOS	1.3 km	MPC · JPL
839171	2014 PZ_{83}	—	August 6, 2014	Haleakala	Pan-STARRS 1	·	1.7 km	MPC · JPL
839172	2014 PJ_{86}	—	August 3, 2014	Haleakala	Pan-STARRS 1	·	1.9 km	MPC · JPL
839173	2014 PB_{87}	—	August 3, 2014	Haleakala	Pan-STARRS 1	·	1.1 km	MPC · JPL
839174	2014 PF_{88}	—	September 17, 2003	Kitt Peak	Spacewatch	·	2.5 km	MPC · JPL
839175	2014 PQ_{88}	—	August 3, 2014	Haleakala	Pan-STARRS 1	·	2.7 km	MPC · JPL
839176	2014 PT_{89}	—	August 3, 2014	Haleakala	Pan-STARRS 1	·	420 m	MPC · JPL
839177	2014 PW_{90}	—	June 26, 2014	Mount Lemmon	Mount Lemmon Survey	·	2.6 km	MPC · JPL
839178	2014 PG_{91}	—	August 3, 2014	Haleakala	Pan-STARRS 1	·	2.2 km	MPC · JPL
839179	2014 PH_{91}	—	August 3, 2014	Haleakala	Pan-STARRS 1	·	2.1 km	MPC · JPL
839180	2014 PQ_{91}	—	August 5, 2014	Haleakala	Pan-STARRS 1	·	2.0 km	MPC · JPL
839181	2014 PA_{92}	—	August 3, 2014	Haleakala	Pan-STARRS 1	·	2.0 km	MPC · JPL
839182	2014 PC_{92}	—	August 3, 2014	Haleakala	Pan-STARRS 1	·	2.0 km	MPC · JPL
839183	2014 PH_{92}	—	August 6, 2014	Haleakala	Pan-STARRS 1	ADE	1.4 km	MPC · JPL
839184	2014 PJ_{92}	—	August 3, 2014	Haleakala	Pan-STARRS 1	·	2.2 km	MPC · JPL
839185	2014 PT_{92}	—	August 3, 2014	Haleakala	Pan-STARRS 1	·	2.3 km	MPC · JPL
839186	2014 PZ_{92}	—	August 3, 2014	Haleakala	Pan-STARRS 1	URS	2.4 km	MPC · JPL
839187	2014 PU_{93}	—	August 3, 2014	Haleakala	Pan-STARRS 1	·	2.1 km	MPC · JPL
839188	2014 PA_{106}	—	August 3, 2014	Haleakala	Pan-STARRS 1	·	2.2 km	MPC · JPL
839189	2014 PA_{116}	—	August 3, 2014	Haleakala	Pan-STARRS 1	·	1.2 km	MPC · JPL
839190	2014 QV_{4}	—	August 18, 2014	Haleakala	Pan-STARRS 1	TIR	2.0 km	MPC · JPL
839191	2014 QU_{7}	—	July 3, 2014	Haleakala	Pan-STARRS 1	·	1.7 km	MPC · JPL
839192	2014 QX_{9}	—	August 18, 2014	Haleakala	Pan-STARRS 1	(194)	1.4 km	MPC · JPL
839193	2014 QM_{10}	—	June 23, 2010	WISE	WISE	·	1.7 km	MPC · JPL
839194	2014 QX_{10}	—	January 14, 2002	Cerro Tololo	Deep Lens Survey	·	2.1 km	MPC · JPL
839195	2014 QM_{12}	—	December 19, 2004	Mount Lemmon	Mount Lemmon Survey	·	2.9 km	MPC · JPL
839196	2014 QH_{14}	—	January 31, 2010	WISE	WISE	TIR	2.2 km	MPC · JPL
839197	2014 QT_{14}	—	July 22, 2010	WISE	WISE	·	700 m	MPC · JPL
839198	2014 QC_{16}	—	August 18, 2014	Haleakala	Pan-STARRS 1	·	2.3 km	MPC · JPL
839199	2014 QK_{16}	—	September 14, 1998	Kitt Peak	Spacewatch	·	850 m	MPC · JPL
839200	2014 QV_{17}	—	August 18, 2014	Haleakala	Pan-STARRS 1	·	2.2 km	MPC · JPL

== 839201–839300 ==
back to top

Designation			Discovery			Properties		Ref
Permanent	Provisional	Named after	Date	Site	Discoverer(s)	Category	Diam.	Ref
839201	2014 QR_{18}	—	July 27, 2014	Haleakala	Pan-STARRS 1	·	2.7 km	MPC · JPL
839202	2014 QF_{19}	—	September 15, 2007	Mount Lemmon	Mount Lemmon Survey	V	470 m	MPC · JPL
839203	2014 QJ_{19}	—	August 18, 2014	Haleakala	Pan-STARRS 1	EOS	1.5 km	MPC · JPL
839204	2014 QR_{20}	—	March 4, 2010	WISE	WISE	EUP	2.5 km	MPC · JPL
839205	2014 QQ_{21}	—	October 24, 2009	Kitt Peak	Spacewatch	·	2.2 km	MPC · JPL
839206	2014 QM_{23}	—	August 18, 2014	Haleakala	Pan-STARRS 1	·	2.6 km	MPC · JPL
839207	2014 QP_{23}	—	July 7, 2014	Haleakala	Pan-STARRS 1	·	2.2 km	MPC · JPL
839208	2014 QH_{24}	—	September 18, 2009	Kitt Peak	Spacewatch	·	1.9 km	MPC · JPL
839209	2014 QA_{25}	—	October 14, 2001	Sacramento Peak	SDSS	·	2.0 km	MPC · JPL
839210	2014 QK_{25}	—	April 17, 2013	Haleakala	Pan-STARRS 1	·	1.3 km	MPC · JPL
839211	2014 QE_{26}	—	May 16, 2010	WISE	WISE	·	1.7 km	MPC · JPL
839212	2014 QO_{27}	—	March 20, 1999	Sacramento Peak	SDSS	·	2.0 km	MPC · JPL
839213	2014 QZ_{28}	—	August 6, 2014	Haleakala	Pan-STARRS 1	·	2.1 km	MPC · JPL
839214	2014 QE_{29}	—	August 18, 2014	Haleakala	Pan-STARRS 1	·	1.6 km	MPC · JPL
839215	2014 QU_{35}	—	July 1, 2014	Haleakala	Pan-STARRS 1	·	1.7 km	MPC · JPL
839216	2014 QW_{36}	—	June 27, 2014	Haleakala	Pan-STARRS 1	·	2.4 km	MPC · JPL
839217	2014 QX_{37}	—	July 25, 2014	Haleakala	Pan-STARRS 1	·	2.3 km	MPC · JPL
839218	2014 QY_{37}	—	July 28, 2014	Haleakala	Pan-STARRS 1	EOS	1.2 km	MPC · JPL
839219	2014 QH_{39}	—	August 18, 2014	Haleakala	Pan-STARRS 1	·	1.9 km	MPC · JPL
839220	2014 QE_{40}	—	February 13, 2008	Kitt Peak	Spacewatch	DOR	1.8 km	MPC · JPL
839221	2014 QP_{41}	—	June 24, 2014	Haleakala	Pan-STARRS 1	·	2.4 km	MPC · JPL
839222	2014 QQ_{43}	—	June 30, 2014	Haleakala	Pan-STARRS 1	·	1.8 km	MPC · JPL
839223	2014 QW_{43}	—	August 20, 2014	Haleakala	Pan-STARRS 1	·	1.5 km	MPC · JPL
839224	2014 QS_{46}	—	July 28, 2014	Haleakala	Pan-STARRS 1	·	1.8 km	MPC · JPL
839225	2014 QM_{50}	—	June 29, 2014	Haleakala	Pan-STARRS 1	·	1.6 km	MPC · JPL
839226	2014 QM_{51}	—	August 27, 2009	Kitt Peak	Spacewatch	·	1.8 km	MPC · JPL
839227	2014 QB_{53}	—	July 30, 2010	WISE	WISE	·	1.3 km	MPC · JPL
839228	2014 QN_{53}	—	July 28, 2014	Haleakala	Pan-STARRS 1	AGN	860 m	MPC · JPL
839229	2014 QJ_{54}	—	August 3, 2014	Haleakala	Pan-STARRS 1	PHO	600 m	MPC · JPL
839230	2014 QO_{54}	—	June 27, 2014	Haleakala	Pan-STARRS 1	H	270 m	MPC · JPL
839231	2014 QS_{55}	—	September 20, 2003	Palomar	NEAT	·	2.4 km	MPC · JPL
839232	2014 QU_{55}	—	January 13, 2010	WISE	WISE	·	1.8 km	MPC · JPL
839233	2014 QP_{56}	—	August 20, 2014	Haleakala	Pan-STARRS 1	·	1.5 km	MPC · JPL
839234	2014 QA_{57}	—	January 31, 2010	WISE	WISE	·	1.6 km	MPC · JPL
839235	2014 QX_{60}	—	December 2, 2010	Mount Lemmon	Mount Lemmon Survey	·	1.9 km	MPC · JPL
839236	2014 QY_{62}	—	October 29, 2002	Sacramento Peak	SDSS	·	1.1 km	MPC · JPL
839237	2014 QM_{64}	—	June 3, 2014	Haleakala	Pan-STARRS 1	·	1.5 km	MPC · JPL
839238	2014 QP_{69}	—	March 5, 2013	Mount Lemmon	Mount Lemmon Survey	·	1.5 km	MPC · JPL
839239	2014 QU_{71}	—	July 1, 2014	Haleakala	Pan-STARRS 1	EOS	1.4 km	MPC · JPL
839240	2014 QX_{71}	—	August 20, 2014	Haleakala	Pan-STARRS 1	·	1.3 km	MPC · JPL
839241	2014 QQ_{73}	—	July 1, 2014	Haleakala	Pan-STARRS 1	·	2.1 km	MPC · JPL
839242	2014 QQ_{83}	—	August 17, 2014	Tincana	Zolnowski, M., Kusiak, M.	·	1.9 km	MPC · JPL
839243	2014 QH_{84}	—	February 11, 2011	Mount Lemmon	Mount Lemmon Survey	·	1.7 km	MPC · JPL
839244	2014 QN_{84}	—	August 20, 2014	Haleakala	Pan-STARRS 1	EOS	1.6 km	MPC · JPL
839245	2014 QX_{84}	—	September 28, 2009	Kitt Peak	Spacewatch	·	2.0 km	MPC · JPL
839246	2014 QH_{86}	—	February 27, 2012	Haleakala	Pan-STARRS 1	EOS	1.4 km	MPC · JPL
839247	2014 QA_{87}	—	August 20, 2014	Haleakala	Pan-STARRS 1	·	2.3 km	MPC · JPL
839248	2014 QR_{88}	—	August 20, 2014	Haleakala	Pan-STARRS 1	·	1.5 km	MPC · JPL
839249	2014 QF_{92}	—	September 23, 2005	Kitt Peak	Spacewatch	·	1.7 km	MPC · JPL
839250	2014 QG_{96}	—	January 27, 2011	Mount Lemmon	Mount Lemmon Survey	·	2.4 km	MPC · JPL
839251	2014 QJ_{98}	—	February 28, 2010	WISE	WISE	·	3.0 km	MPC · JPL
839252	2014 QV_{98}	—	April 24, 2007	Kitt Peak	Spacewatch	·	470 m	MPC · JPL
839253	2014 QZ_{98}	—	December 25, 2010	Mount Lemmon	Mount Lemmon Survey	·	2.2 km	MPC · JPL
839254	2014 QX_{99}	—	January 19, 2012	Haleakala	Pan-STARRS 1	·	2.6 km	MPC · JPL
839255	2014 QY_{100}	—	August 20, 2014	Haleakala	Pan-STARRS 1	·	1.9 km	MPC · JPL
839256	2014 QP_{101}	—	November 21, 2009	Mount Lemmon	Mount Lemmon Survey	·	2.3 km	MPC · JPL
839257	2014 QB_{110}	—	June 3, 2014	Haleakala	Pan-STARRS 1	·	2.0 km	MPC · JPL
839258	2014 QC_{110}	—	July 1, 2014	Haleakala	Pan-STARRS 1	·	1.9 km	MPC · JPL
839259	2014 QH_{110}	—	February 11, 2010	WISE	WISE	·	3.0 km	MPC · JPL
839260	2014 QP_{110}	—	September 15, 2009	Kitt Peak	Spacewatch	EOS	1.3 km	MPC · JPL
839261	2014 QD_{119}	—	August 3, 2014	Haleakala	Pan-STARRS 1	THM	1.7 km	MPC · JPL
839262	2014 QW_{119}	—	July 26, 2014	Haleakala	Pan-STARRS 1	·	2.0 km	MPC · JPL
839263	2014 QQ_{121}	—	January 19, 2012	Kitt Peak	Spacewatch	·	790 m	MPC · JPL
839264	2014 QB_{123}	—	November 16, 2009	Mount Lemmon	Mount Lemmon Survey	THM	1.5 km	MPC · JPL
839265	2014 QW_{123}	—	August 4, 2014	Haleakala	Pan-STARRS 1	·	1.5 km	MPC · JPL
839266	2014 QX_{124}	—	August 20, 2014	Haleakala	Pan-STARRS 1	·	810 m	MPC · JPL
839267	2014 QH_{125}	—	July 26, 2014	Haleakala	Pan-STARRS 1	·	2.0 km	MPC · JPL
839268	2014 QA_{126}	—	September 10, 2007	Kitt Peak	Spacewatch	·	500 m	MPC · JPL
839269	2014 QW_{132}	—	August 20, 2014	Haleakala	Pan-STARRS 1	·	740 m	MPC · JPL
839270	2014 QZ_{132}	—	April 26, 2006	Cerro Tololo	Deep Ecliptic Survey	·	2.1 km	MPC · JPL
839271	2014 QK_{133}	—	July 28, 2014	Haleakala	Pan-STARRS 1	·	2.2 km	MPC · JPL
839272	2014 QU_{133}	—	February 20, 2009	Mount Lemmon	Mount Lemmon Survey	V	440 m	MPC · JPL
839273	2014 QA_{137}	—	August 20, 2014	Haleakala	Pan-STARRS 1	·	910 m	MPC · JPL
839274	2014 QL_{137}	—	December 30, 2011	Kitt Peak	Spacewatch	·	780 m	MPC · JPL
839275	2014 QJ_{138}	—	July 31, 2014	Haleakala	Pan-STARRS 1	V	540 m	MPC · JPL
839276	2014 QX_{139}	—	February 5, 2011	Mount Lemmon	Mount Lemmon Survey	·	2.3 km	MPC · JPL
839277	2014 QE_{140}	—	August 20, 2014	Haleakala	Pan-STARRS 1	·	2.0 km	MPC · JPL
839278	2014 QS_{140}	—	August 20, 2014	Haleakala	Pan-STARRS 1	EOS	1.5 km	MPC · JPL
839279	2014 QG_{141}	—	August 20, 2014	Haleakala	Pan-STARRS 1	·	500 m	MPC · JPL
839280	2014 QV_{141}	—	August 20, 2014	Haleakala	Pan-STARRS 1	THB	1.6 km	MPC · JPL
839281	2014 QB_{142}	—	August 20, 2014	Haleakala	Pan-STARRS 1	·	1.3 km	MPC · JPL
839282	2014 QJ_{144}	—	April 3, 2010	WISE	WISE	·	1.5 km	MPC · JPL
839283	2014 QB_{153}	—	July 31, 2014	Haleakala	Pan-STARRS 1	·	2.7 km	MPC · JPL
839284	2014 QD_{155}	—	August 22, 2014	Haleakala	Pan-STARRS 1	EOS	1.3 km	MPC · JPL
839285	2014 QF_{155}	—	June 30, 2014	Haleakala	Pan-STARRS 1	·	2.2 km	MPC · JPL
839286	2014 QO_{156}	—	June 27, 2014	Haleakala	Pan-STARRS 1	·	2.0 km	MPC · JPL
839287	2014 QN_{157}	—	March 11, 2005	Kitt Peak	Spacewatch	·	970 m	MPC · JPL
839288	2014 QR_{157}	—	September 26, 2009	Mount Lemmon	Mount Lemmon Survey	·	2.2 km	MPC · JPL
839289	2014 QK_{162}	—	September 9, 2011	Kitt Peak	Spacewatch	·	510 m	MPC · JPL
839290	2014 QO_{164}	—	June 13, 2010	WISE	WISE	·	1.2 km	MPC · JPL
839291	2014 QR_{164}	—	August 18, 2009	Kitt Peak	Spacewatch	·	2.2 km	MPC · JPL
839292	2014 QL_{165}	—	February 19, 2009	Kitt Peak	Spacewatch	·	1.3 km	MPC · JPL
839293	2014 QZ_{166}	—	August 22, 2014	Haleakala	Pan-STARRS 1	·	2.0 km	MPC · JPL
839294	2014 QG_{168}	—	January 4, 2011	Mount Lemmon	Mount Lemmon Survey	BRA	1.1 km	MPC · JPL
839295	2014 QX_{168}	—	June 3, 2014	Haleakala	Pan-STARRS 1	T_{j} (2.85)	2.8 km	MPC · JPL
839296	2014 QE_{169}	—	July 1, 2014	Haleakala	Pan-STARRS 1	H	310 m	MPC · JPL
839297	2014 QP_{175}	—	October 16, 2003	Kitt Peak	Spacewatch	·	2.6 km	MPC · JPL
839298	2014 QH_{182}	—	October 16, 2009	Mount Lemmon	Mount Lemmon Survey	·	1.7 km	MPC · JPL
839299	2014 QP_{182}	—	August 22, 2014	Haleakala	Pan-STARRS 1	·	1.4 km	MPC · JPL
839300	2014 QQ_{182}	—	August 22, 2014	Haleakala	Pan-STARRS 1	·	2.3 km	MPC · JPL

== 839301–839400 ==
back to top

Designation			Discovery			Properties		Ref
Permanent	Provisional	Named after	Date	Site	Discoverer(s)	Category	Diam.	Ref
839301	2014 QF_{183}	—	August 22, 2014	Haleakala	Pan-STARRS 1	·	840 m	MPC · JPL
839302	2014 QA_{186}	—	August 22, 2014	Haleakala	Pan-STARRS 1	·	2.0 km	MPC · JPL
839303	2014 QY_{189}	—	July 30, 2014	Kitt Peak	Spacewatch	·	1.8 km	MPC · JPL
839304	2014 QG_{192}	—	February 9, 2010	WISE	WISE	THB	1.9 km	MPC · JPL
839305	2014 QW_{192}	—	August 22, 2014	Haleakala	Pan-STARRS 1	·	3.0 km	MPC · JPL
839306	2014 QN_{196}	—	March 16, 2012	Kitt Peak	Spacewatch	·	1.2 km	MPC · JPL
839307	2014 QT_{196}	—	August 22, 2014	Haleakala	Pan-STARRS 1	·	1.5 km	MPC · JPL
839308	2014 QB_{200}	—	July 24, 2003	Palomar	NEAT	·	2.5 km	MPC · JPL
839309	2014 QN_{202}	—	February 2, 2010	WISE	WISE	·	2.3 km	MPC · JPL
839310	2014 QL_{203}	—	January 19, 2012	Haleakala	Pan-STARRS 1	·	2.1 km	MPC · JPL
839311	2014 QS_{205}	—	June 19, 2010	WISE	WISE	·	2.4 km	MPC · JPL
839312	2014 QT_{205}	—	August 22, 2014	Haleakala	Pan-STARRS 1	·	2.1 km	MPC · JPL
839313	2014 QF_{214}	—	January 29, 2011	Mount Lemmon	Mount Lemmon Survey	·	1.8 km	MPC · JPL
839314	2014 QE_{216}	—	March 1, 2008	Kitt Peak	Spacewatch	·	1.3 km	MPC · JPL
839315	2014 QY_{216}	—	August 22, 2014	Haleakala	Pan-STARRS 1	·	2.3 km	MPC · JPL
839316	2014 QC_{217}	—	November 8, 2009	Mount Lemmon	Mount Lemmon Survey	·	1.8 km	MPC · JPL
839317	2014 QW_{218}	—	August 22, 2014	Haleakala	Pan-STARRS 1	·	2.3 km	MPC · JPL
839318	2014 QZ_{219}	—	September 4, 2010	Mount Lemmon	Mount Lemmon Survey	·	620 m	MPC · JPL
839319	2014 QC_{224}	—	September 19, 2003	Kitt Peak	Spacewatch	·	2.2 km	MPC · JPL
839320	2014 QJ_{228}	—	August 22, 2014	Haleakala	Pan-STARRS 1	·	1.3 km	MPC · JPL
839321	2014 QD_{230}	—	March 20, 1999	Sacramento Peak	SDSS	·	640 m	MPC · JPL
839322	2014 QJ_{230}	—	February 12, 2010	WISE	WISE	·	3.8 km	MPC · JPL
839323	2014 QZ_{231}	—	February 5, 2010	WISE	WISE	LUT	3.4 km	MPC · JPL
839324	2014 QW_{232}	—	March 25, 2012	Mount Lemmon	Mount Lemmon Survey	·	2.1 km	MPC · JPL
839325	2014 QF_{236}	—	August 26, 2005	Palomar	NEAT	·	1.5 km	MPC · JPL
839326	2014 QH_{238}	—	February 24, 2010	WISE	WISE	·	3.3 km	MPC · JPL
839327	2014 QR_{238}	—	February 8, 2011	Mount Lemmon	Mount Lemmon Survey	·	2.3 km	MPC · JPL
839328	2014 QP_{239}	—	October 14, 2009	Mount Lemmon	Mount Lemmon Survey	·	1.9 km	MPC · JPL
839329	2014 QQ_{240}	—	August 20, 2014	Haleakala	Pan-STARRS 1	VER	1.9 km	MPC · JPL
839330	2014 QN_{241}	—	May 12, 2013	Haleakala	Pan-STARRS 1	·	1.9 km	MPC · JPL
839331	2014 QR_{242}	—	March 21, 1999	Sacramento Peak	SDSS	NEM	1.7 km	MPC · JPL
839332	2014 QM_{247}	—	October 1, 2003	Kitt Peak	Spacewatch	·	2.1 km	MPC · JPL
839333	2014 QB_{250}	—	July 31, 2014	Haleakala	Pan-STARRS 1	URS	2.1 km	MPC · JPL
839334	2014 QB_{252}	—	October 27, 2003	Kitt Peak	Spacewatch	·	2.2 km	MPC · JPL
839335	2014 QW_{253}	—	September 28, 2003	Sacramento Peak	SDSS	·	2.3 km	MPC · JPL
839336	2014 QM_{254}	—	August 5, 2010	WISE	WISE	(194)	1.5 km	MPC · JPL
839337	2014 QS_{254}	—	November 16, 2009	Mount Lemmon	Mount Lemmon Survey	·	2.2 km	MPC · JPL
839338	2014 QB_{256}	—	October 22, 2009	Mount Lemmon	Mount Lemmon Survey	(31811)	2.2 km	MPC · JPL
839339	2014 QQ_{257}	—	April 19, 2013	Haleakala	Pan-STARRS 1	·	2.3 km	MPC · JPL
839340	2014 QF_{258}	—	August 22, 2014	Haleakala	Pan-STARRS 1	·	2.1 km	MPC · JPL
839341	2014 QZ_{258}	—	April 13, 2013	Haleakala	Pan-STARRS 1	TIR	1.8 km	MPC · JPL
839342	2014 QC_{259}	—	November 19, 2009	Kitt Peak	Spacewatch	LIX	2.7 km	MPC · JPL
839343	2014 QB_{260}	—	October 24, 2009	Kitt Peak	Spacewatch	·	2.0 km	MPC · JPL
839344	2014 QD_{260}	—	August 22, 2014	Haleakala	Pan-STARRS 1	·	1.9 km	MPC · JPL
839345	2014 QN_{261}	—	February 11, 2010	WISE	WISE	·	2.0 km	MPC · JPL
839346	2014 QF_{262}	—	August 22, 2014	Haleakala	Pan-STARRS 1	·	2.1 km	MPC · JPL
839347	2014 QS_{262}	—	August 22, 2014	Haleakala	Pan-STARRS 1	VER	1.9 km	MPC · JPL
839348	2014 QU_{262}	—	July 7, 2014	Haleakala	Pan-STARRS 1	·	2.0 km	MPC · JPL
839349	2014 QH_{263}	—	July 31, 2014	Haleakala	Pan-STARRS 1	PHO	700 m	MPC · JPL
839350	2014 QG_{264}	—	August 22, 2014	Haleakala	Pan-STARRS 1	·	2.0 km	MPC · JPL
839351	2014 QY_{271}	—	October 4, 2004	Kitt Peak	Spacewatch	EOS	1.4 km	MPC · JPL
839352	2014 QY_{273}	—	October 27, 1998	Kitt Peak	Spacewatch	·	2.3 km	MPC · JPL
839353	2014 QH_{276}	—	August 1, 2014	Haleakala	Pan-STARRS 1	·	580 m	MPC · JPL
839354	2014 QJ_{277}	—	September 19, 2009	Kitt Peak	Spacewatch	·	1.6 km	MPC · JPL
839355	2014 QB_{279}	—	January 29, 2011	Mount Lemmon	Mount Lemmon Survey	·	1.7 km	MPC · JPL
839356	2014 QA_{280}	—	July 28, 2014	Haleakala	Pan-STARRS 1	·	1.8 km	MPC · JPL
839357	2014 QY_{280}	—	March 20, 1999	Sacramento Peak	SDSS	·	1.7 km	MPC · JPL
839358	2014 QC_{283}	—	June 19, 2010	WISE	WISE	·	2.5 km	MPC · JPL
839359	2014 QP_{283}	—	April 17, 2013	Haleakala	Pan-STARRS 1	LIX	2.4 km	MPC · JPL
839360	2014 QB_{285}	—	March 21, 1999	Sacramento Peak	SDSS	·	2.3 km	MPC · JPL
839361	2014 QT_{285}	—	February 14, 2010	WISE	WISE	·	4.3 km	MPC · JPL
839362	2014 QB_{287}	—	August 25, 2014	Haleakala	Pan-STARRS 1	·	2.1 km	MPC · JPL
839363	2014 QS_{287}	—	August 25, 2014	Haleakala	Pan-STARRS 1	·	1.9 km	MPC · JPL
839364	2014 QX_{289}	—	August 25, 2014	Haleakala	Pan-STARRS 1	·	2.2 km	MPC · JPL
839365	2014 QC_{291}	—	January 29, 2010	WISE	WISE	·	2.2 km	MPC · JPL
839366	2014 QH_{291}	—	September 21, 2009	Mount Lemmon	Mount Lemmon Survey	·	2.0 km	MPC · JPL
839367	2014 QJ_{291}	—	August 25, 2014	Haleakala	Pan-STARRS 1	·	1.9 km	MPC · JPL
839368	2014 QU_{291}	—	November 20, 2003	Socorro	LINEAR	THB	2.2 km	MPC · JPL
839369	2014 QV_{291}	—	June 28, 2010	WISE	WISE	·	2.0 km	MPC · JPL
839370	2014 QB_{294}	—	January 13, 2002	Sacramento Peak	SDSS	·	2.4 km	MPC · JPL
839371	2014 QN_{300}	—	February 9, 2010	WISE	WISE	URS	2.5 km	MPC · JPL
839372	2014 QQ_{300}	—	August 20, 2014	Haleakala	Pan-STARRS 1	·	2.5 km	MPC · JPL
839373	2014 QH_{304}	—	January 8, 2010	WISE	WISE	·	2.7 km	MPC · JPL
839374	2014 QJ_{306}	—	January 27, 2010	WISE	WISE	·	1.8 km	MPC · JPL
839375	2014 QO_{308}	—	July 25, 2014	Haleakala	Pan-STARRS 1	·	2.0 km	MPC · JPL
839376	2014 QS_{310}	—	June 24, 2014	Haleakala	Pan-STARRS 1	·	1.9 km	MPC · JPL
839377	2014 QG_{311}	—	August 25, 2014	Haleakala	Pan-STARRS 1	·	1.9 km	MPC · JPL
839378	2014 QP_{313}	—	July 3, 2014	Haleakala	Pan-STARRS 1	·	1.7 km	MPC · JPL
839379	2014 QY_{315}	—	May 3, 2006	Mount Lemmon	Mount Lemmon Survey	MAS	550 m	MPC · JPL
839380	2014 QZ_{316}	—	August 15, 2014	Haleakala	Pan-STARRS 1	·	1.8 km	MPC · JPL
839381	2014 QN_{320}	—	July 28, 2014	ESA OGS	ESA OGS	·	2.2 km	MPC · JPL
839382	2014 QO_{320}	—	August 25, 2014	Haleakala	Pan-STARRS 1	·	1.5 km	MPC · JPL
839383	2014 QP_{322}	—	March 9, 2010	WISE	WISE	LIX	2.7 km	MPC · JPL
839384	2014 QP_{323}	—	October 1, 2010	Mount Lemmon	Mount Lemmon Survey	·	790 m	MPC · JPL
839385	2014 QN_{328}	—	October 21, 2003	Kitt Peak	Spacewatch	LIX	2.2 km	MPC · JPL
839386	2014 QO_{330}	—	August 22, 2003	Palomar	NEAT	·	3.1 km	MPC · JPL
839387	2014 QU_{330}	—	August 25, 2014	Haleakala	Pan-STARRS 1	·	480 m	MPC · JPL
839388	2014 QA_{334}	—	August 24, 2014	Kitt Peak	Spacewatch	THM	1.9 km	MPC · JPL
839389	2014 QV_{334}	—	February 9, 2005	Kitt Peak	Spacewatch	LIX	2.7 km	MPC · JPL
839390	2014 QZ_{334}	—	September 26, 2000	Sacramento Peak	SDSS	MRX	890 m	MPC · JPL
839391	2014 QX_{337}	—	June 27, 2010	WISE	WISE	·	3.1 km	MPC · JPL
839392	2014 QX_{339}	—	September 18, 2009	Mount Lemmon	Mount Lemmon Survey	·	1.8 km	MPC · JPL
839393	2014 QN_{340}	—	August 26, 2014	Haleakala	Pan-STARRS 1	·	730 m	MPC · JPL
839394	2014 QZ_{340}	—	June 10, 2010	WISE	WISE	·	2.0 km	MPC · JPL
839395	2014 QG_{342}	—	January 30, 2006	Kitt Peak	Spacewatch	PHO	610 m	MPC · JPL
839396	2014 QM_{342}	—	October 11, 2007	Kitt Peak	Spacewatch	NYS	750 m	MPC · JPL
839397	2014 QG_{346}	—	June 28, 2014	Haleakala	Pan-STARRS 1	·	2.2 km	MPC · JPL
839398	2014 QJ_{346}	—	July 2, 2014	Haleakala	Pan-STARRS 1	·	1.9 km	MPC · JPL
839399	2014 QL_{348}	—	August 27, 2014	Haleakala	Pan-STARRS 1	·	1.9 km	MPC · JPL
839400	2014 QP_{348}	—	February 13, 2010	WISE	WISE	·	3.0 km	MPC · JPL

== 839401–839500 ==
back to top

Designation			Discovery			Properties		Ref
Permanent	Provisional	Named after	Date	Site	Discoverer(s)	Category	Diam.	Ref
839401	2014 QR_{349}	—	September 11, 2007	Mount Lemmon	Mount Lemmon Survey	·	590 m	MPC · JPL
839402	2014 QB_{350}	—	March 20, 1999	Sacramento Peak	SDSS	·	710 m	MPC · JPL
839403	2014 QY_{352}	—	August 27, 2014	Haleakala	Pan-STARRS 1	·	2.6 km	MPC · JPL
839404	2014 QX_{353}	—	December 14, 2003	Kitt Peak	Spacewatch	MAS	520 m	MPC · JPL
839405	2014 QZ_{358}	—	July 29, 2014	Haleakala	Pan-STARRS 1	THB	2.4 km	MPC · JPL
839406	2014 QG_{360}	—	October 14, 2009	Mount Lemmon	Mount Lemmon Survey	·	2.0 km	MPC · JPL
839407	2014 QC_{361}	—	October 21, 2009	Mount Lemmon	Mount Lemmon Survey	·	1.4 km	MPC · JPL
839408	2014 QY_{367}	—	January 16, 2011	Mount Lemmon	Mount Lemmon Survey	·	940 m	MPC · JPL
839409	2014 QA_{368}	—	December 6, 2007	Mount Lemmon	Mount Lemmon Survey	·	900 m	MPC · JPL
839410	2014 QX_{369}	—	September 19, 2003	Kitt Peak	Spacewatch	·	2.4 km	MPC · JPL
839411	2014 QO_{371}	—	November 27, 2009	Kitt Peak	Spacewatch	THM	1.4 km	MPC · JPL
839412	2014 QM_{372}	—	February 16, 2010	WISE	WISE	EUP	3.8 km	MPC · JPL
839413	2014 QA_{381}	—	August 27, 2014	Haleakala	Pan-STARRS 1	·	2.0 km	MPC · JPL
839414	2014 QZ_{381}	—	June 28, 2014	Mount Lemmon	Mount Lemmon Survey	·	1.8 km	MPC · JPL
839415	2014 QW_{382}	—	August 28, 2014	Haleakala	Pan-STARRS 1	TIR	2.5 km	MPC · JPL
839416	2014 QR_{384}	—	September 18, 2009	Kitt Peak	Spacewatch	·	1.4 km	MPC · JPL
839417	2014 QM_{385}	—	October 13, 2010	Mount Lemmon	Mount Lemmon Survey	·	1.1 km	MPC · JPL
839418	2014 QX_{387}	—	August 5, 2010	WISE	WISE	ADE	2.0 km	MPC · JPL
839419	2014 QA_{390}	—	February 10, 2011	Mount Lemmon	Mount Lemmon Survey	·	2.2 km	MPC · JPL
839420	2014 QP_{393}	—	August 20, 2014	Haleakala	Pan-STARRS 1	·	2.2 km	MPC · JPL
839421	2014 QN_{394}	—	June 5, 2013	Mount Lemmon	Mount Lemmon Survey	·	1.3 km	MPC · JPL
839422	2014 QY_{396}	—	August 27, 2014	Haleakala	Pan-STARRS 1	·	2.1 km	MPC · JPL
839423	2014 QS_{397}	—	August 27, 2014	Haleakala	Pan-STARRS 1	·	2.2 km	MPC · JPL
839424	2014 QV_{398}	—	August 28, 2014	Kitt Peak	Spacewatch	·	820 m	MPC · JPL
839425	2014 QZ_{398}	—	September 19, 1998	Sacramento Peak	SDSS	·	2.5 km	MPC · JPL
839426	2014 QC_{400}	—	July 6, 2014	Haleakala	Pan-STARRS 1	·	1.9 km	MPC · JPL
839427	2014 QZ_{404}	—	August 28, 2014	Haleakala	Pan-STARRS 1	TIR	1.9 km	MPC · JPL
839428	2014 QJ_{405}	—	August 28, 2014	Haleakala	Pan-STARRS 1	·	2.1 km	MPC · JPL
839429	2014 QN_{405}	—	September 3, 2007	Mount Lemmon	Mount Lemmon Survey	PHO	570 m	MPC · JPL
839430	2014 QC_{410}	—	August 30, 2014	Mount Lemmon	Mount Lemmon Survey	·	880 m	MPC · JPL
839431	2014 QX_{410}	—	November 9, 2009	Mount Lemmon	Mount Lemmon Survey	THM	1.7 km	MPC · JPL
839432	2014 QE_{412}	—	July 25, 2014	Haleakala	Pan-STARRS 1	·	1.9 km	MPC · JPL
839433	2014 QD_{415}	—	August 3, 2014	Haleakala	Pan-STARRS 1	LIX	1.9 km	MPC · JPL
839434	2014 QR_{415}	—	March 11, 2010	WISE	WISE	·	1.0 km	MPC · JPL
839435	2014 QB_{417}	—	August 30, 2014	Kitt Peak	Spacewatch	·	2.2 km	MPC · JPL
839436	2014 QP_{418}	—	July 28, 2005	Palomar	NEAT	·	1.5 km	MPC · JPL
839437	2014 QS_{418}	—	March 16, 2012	Mount Lemmon	Mount Lemmon Survey	·	930 m	MPC · JPL
839438	2014 QM_{421}	—	June 24, 2014	Haleakala	Pan-STARRS 1	·	1.9 km	MPC · JPL
839439	2014 QX_{421}	—	August 31, 2014	Kitt Peak	Spacewatch	·	2.6 km	MPC · JPL
839440	2014 QK_{424}	—	October 21, 2011	Mount Lemmon	Mount Lemmon Survey	·	550 m	MPC · JPL
839441	2014 QP_{427}	—	August 22, 2014	Haleakala	Pan-STARRS 1	·	2.0 km	MPC · JPL
839442	2014 QD_{428}	—	August 20, 2014	Haleakala	Pan-STARRS 1	·	860 m	MPC · JPL
839443	2014 QL_{428}	—	August 19, 2014	Haleakala	Pan-STARRS 1	V	450 m	MPC · JPL
839444	2014 QX_{432}	—	August 28, 2014	Haleakala	Pan-STARRS 1	APO · PHA	380 m	MPC · JPL
839445	2014 QM_{434}	—	October 8, 1999	Socorro	LINEAR	·	910 m	MPC · JPL
839446	2014 QM_{439}	—	October 19, 2003	Sacramento Peak	SDSS	·	950 m	MPC · JPL
839447	2014 QO_{440}	—	June 5, 2014	Haleakala	Pan-STARRS 1	·	2.1 km	MPC · JPL
839448	2014 QL_{442}	—	August 23, 2014	Haleakala	Pan-STARRS 1	H	350 m	MPC · JPL
839449	2014 QA_{443}	—	October 13, 1999	Sacramento Peak	SDSS	3:2 · SHU	3.7 km	MPC · JPL
839450	2014 QA_{444}	—	August 6, 2014	Haleakala	Pan-STARRS 1	·	2.0 km	MPC · JPL
839451	2014 QO_{445}	—	August 23, 2014	Haleakala	Pan-STARRS 1	·	1.8 km	MPC · JPL
839452	2014 QH_{446}	—	August 27, 2014	Haleakala	Pan-STARRS 1	HYG · critical	2.0 km	MPC · JPL
839453	2014 QC_{447}	—	August 29, 2014	Haleakala	Pan-STARRS 1	EUN	940 m	MPC · JPL
839454	2014 QR_{447}	—	March 12, 2010	WISE	WISE	·	2.1 km	MPC · JPL
839455	2014 QJ_{448}	—	December 2, 2005	Mount Lemmon	Mount Lemmon Survey	KOR	990 m	MPC · JPL
839456	2014 QH_{450}	—	March 16, 2007	Mount Lemmon	Mount Lemmon Survey	TIR	2.4 km	MPC · JPL
839457	2014 QC_{455}	—	August 20, 2014	Haleakala	Pan-STARRS 1	·	1.7 km	MPC · JPL
839458	2014 QM_{456}	—	September 21, 2003	Kitt Peak	Spacewatch	·	1.9 km	MPC · JPL
839459	2014 QT_{456}	—	October 24, 2009	Kitt Peak	Spacewatch	·	1.8 km	MPC · JPL
839460	2014 QU_{457}	—	February 10, 2010	WISE	WISE	·	1.9 km	MPC · JPL
839461	2014 QD_{459}	—	April 11, 2013	Kitt Peak	Spacewatch	·	2.0 km	MPC · JPL
839462	2014 QD_{462}	—	August 22, 2014	Haleakala	Pan-STARRS 1	·	1.0 km	MPC · JPL
839463	2014 QR_{465}	—	October 30, 2009	Mount Lemmon	Mount Lemmon Survey	·	1.9 km	MPC · JPL
839464	2014 QH_{467}	—	October 26, 2009	Kitt Peak	Spacewatch	·	1.9 km	MPC · JPL
839465	2014 QR_{467}	—	August 27, 2014	Haleakala	Pan-STARRS 1	·	2.2 km	MPC · JPL
839466	2014 QB_{468}	—	August 27, 2014	Haleakala	Pan-STARRS 1	·	1.1 km	MPC · JPL
839467	2014 QC_{470}	—	January 27, 2011	Mount Lemmon	Mount Lemmon Survey	·	1.9 km	MPC · JPL
839468	2014 QD_{471}	—	April 15, 2013	Haleakala	Pan-STARRS 1	·	1.9 km	MPC · JPL
839469	2014 QB_{472}	—	September 28, 2009	Mount Lemmon	Mount Lemmon Survey	·	1.3 km	MPC · JPL
839470	2014 QP_{472}	—	September 18, 2003	Palomar	NEAT	·	2.2 km	MPC · JPL
839471	2014 QX_{479}	—	October 23, 2009	Mount Lemmon	Mount Lemmon Survey	·	2.2 km	MPC · JPL
839472	2014 QZ_{481}	—	October 2, 2003	Kitt Peak	Spacewatch	·	2.0 km	MPC · JPL
839473	2014 QS_{482}	—	July 28, 2014	Haleakala	Pan-STARRS 1	·	2.0 km	MPC · JPL
839474	2014 QF_{483}	—	January 30, 2011	Mount Lemmon	Mount Lemmon Survey	URS	2.0 km	MPC · JPL
839475	2014 QG_{486}	—	July 31, 2014	Haleakala	Pan-STARRS 1	·	1 km	MPC · JPL
839476	2014 QX_{486}	—	August 21, 2014	Haleakala	Pan-STARRS 1	·	760 m	MPC · JPL
839477	2014 QD_{492}	—	July 30, 2010	WISE	WISE	·	1.5 km	MPC · JPL
839478	2014 QX_{492}	—	August 25, 2014	Haleakala	Pan-STARRS 1	·	2.2 km	MPC · JPL
839479	2014 QG_{497}	—	January 30, 2010	WISE	WISE	·	2.6 km	MPC · JPL
839480	2014 QB_{499}	—	August 28, 2014	Haleakala	Pan-STARRS 1	·	1.5 km	MPC · JPL
839481	2014 QG_{499}	—	August 28, 2014	Haleakala	Pan-STARRS 1	·	2.2 km	MPC · JPL
839482	2014 QR_{499}	—	June 9, 2010	WISE	WISE	·	1.1 km	MPC · JPL
839483	2014 QA_{500}	—	November 23, 2009	Catalina	CSS	·	2.1 km	MPC · JPL
839484	2014 QE_{500}	—	December 10, 2009	Catalina	CSS	·	2.2 km	MPC · JPL
839485	2014 QL_{500}	—	August 18, 2014	Haleakala	Pan-STARRS 1	·	2.0 km	MPC · JPL
839486	2014 QO_{500}	—	August 23, 2014	Haleakala	Pan-STARRS 1	·	1.8 km	MPC · JPL
839487	2014 QZ_{500}	—	August 23, 2014	Haleakala	Pan-STARRS 1	·	570 m	MPC · JPL
839488	2014 QB_{505}	—	August 28, 2014	Haleakala	Pan-STARRS 1	·	1.1 km	MPC · JPL
839489	2014 QC_{505}	—	August 23, 2014	Haleakala	Pan-STARRS 1	·	2.1 km	MPC · JPL
839490	2014 QD_{505}	—	February 25, 2010	WISE	WISE	EUP	2.8 km	MPC · JPL
839491	2014 QU_{505}	—	August 23, 2014	Haleakala	Pan-STARRS 1	·	1.6 km	MPC · JPL
839492	2014 QG_{507}	—	August 26, 2014	Haleakala	Pan-STARRS 1	·	1.4 km	MPC · JPL
839493	2014 QD_{510}	—	August 25, 2014	Haleakala	Pan-STARRS 1	·	1.2 km	MPC · JPL
839494	2014 QX_{520}	—	August 25, 2014	Haleakala	Pan-STARRS 1	·	1.4 km	MPC · JPL
839495	2014 QH_{521}	—	October 24, 2003	Kitt Peak	Spacewatch	URS	2.1 km	MPC · JPL
839496	2014 QP_{521}	—	August 27, 2014	Haleakala	Pan-STARRS 1	EOS	1.5 km	MPC · JPL
839497	2014 QF_{522}	—	September 28, 2003	Sacramento Peak	SDSS	URS	2.5 km	MPC · JPL
839498	2014 QY_{522}	—	August 31, 2014	Haleakala	Pan-STARRS 1	·	2.2 km	MPC · JPL
839499	2014 QT_{525}	—	August 20, 2014	Haleakala	Pan-STARRS 1	·	1.8 km	MPC · JPL
839500	2014 QO_{526}	—	August 18, 2014	Haleakala	Pan-STARRS 1	·	840 m	MPC · JPL

== 839501–839600 ==
back to top

Designation			Discovery			Properties		Ref
Permanent	Provisional	Named after	Date	Site	Discoverer(s)	Category	Diam.	Ref
839501	2014 QC_{528}	—	August 30, 2014	Haleakala	Pan-STARRS 1	·	2.9 km	MPC · JPL
839502	2014 QR_{529}	—	August 25, 2014	Haleakala	Pan-STARRS 1	PHO	640 m	MPC · JPL
839503	2014 QC_{531}	—	August 20, 2014	Haleakala	Pan-STARRS 1	·	2.1 km	MPC · JPL
839504	2014 QK_{532}	—	August 25, 2014	Haleakala	Pan-STARRS 1	·	1.2 km	MPC · JPL
839505	2014 QL_{532}	—	August 20, 2014	Haleakala	Pan-STARRS 1	·	490 m	MPC · JPL
839506	2014 QY_{532}	—	August 20, 2014	Haleakala	Pan-STARRS 1	·	2.1 km	MPC · JPL
839507	2014 QX_{533}	—	August 28, 2014	Haleakala	Pan-STARRS 1	·	2.3 km	MPC · JPL
839508	2014 QB_{535}	—	August 22, 2014	Haleakala	Pan-STARRS 1	·	2.0 km	MPC · JPL
839509	2014 QS_{535}	—	August 20, 2014	Haleakala	Pan-STARRS 1	·	2.0 km	MPC · JPL
839510	2014 QW_{535}	—	August 25, 2014	Haleakala	Pan-STARRS 1	·	2.1 km	MPC · JPL
839511	2014 QE_{536}	—	August 28, 2014	Haleakala	Pan-STARRS 1	·	2.3 km	MPC · JPL
839512	2014 QH_{536}	—	August 29, 2014	Mount Lemmon	Mount Lemmon Survey	·	2.2 km	MPC · JPL
839513	2014 QD_{537}	—	August 28, 2014	Haleakala	Pan-STARRS 1	LIX	2.3 km	MPC · JPL
839514	2014 QK_{537}	—	August 28, 2014	Haleakala	Pan-STARRS 1	THB	1.8 km	MPC · JPL
839515	2014 QY_{537}	—	August 28, 2014	Haleakala	Pan-STARRS 1	·	2.2 km	MPC · JPL
839516	2014 QG_{538}	—	August 28, 2014	Haleakala	Pan-STARRS 1	·	2.0 km	MPC · JPL
839517	2014 QQ_{538}	—	August 25, 2014	Haleakala	Pan-STARRS 1	·	2.0 km	MPC · JPL
839518	2014 QT_{538}	—	August 28, 2014	Haleakala	Pan-STARRS 1	EOS	1.5 km	MPC · JPL
839519	2014 QG_{539}	—	August 30, 2014	Mount Lemmon	Mount Lemmon Survey	·	2.4 km	MPC · JPL
839520	2014 QH_{539}	—	August 20, 2014	Haleakala	Pan-STARRS 1	·	2.3 km	MPC · JPL
839521	2014 QK_{539}	—	August 28, 2014	Haleakala	Pan-STARRS 1	·	2.0 km	MPC · JPL
839522	2014 QV_{539}	—	August 25, 2014	Haleakala	Pan-STARRS 1	VER	2.1 km	MPC · JPL
839523	2014 QK_{540}	—	August 20, 2014	Haleakala	Pan-STARRS 1	VER	2.0 km	MPC · JPL
839524	2014 QM_{540}	—	August 30, 2014	Mount Lemmon	Mount Lemmon Survey	·	1.9 km	MPC · JPL
839525	2014 QV_{541}	—	August 25, 2014	Haleakala	Pan-STARRS 1	·	2.1 km	MPC · JPL
839526	2014 QX_{541}	—	August 27, 2014	Haleakala	Pan-STARRS 1	VER	2.0 km	MPC · JPL
839527	2014 QZ_{549}	—	August 28, 2014	Haleakala	Pan-STARRS 1	·	2.3 km	MPC · JPL
839528	2014 QU_{551}	—	August 28, 2014	Haleakala	Pan-STARRS 1	·	570 m	MPC · JPL
839529	2014 QZ_{555}	—	August 25, 2014	Haleakala	Pan-STARRS 1	·	1.1 km	MPC · JPL
839530	2014 QM_{563}	—	August 20, 2014	Haleakala	Pan-STARRS 1	·	2.6 km	MPC · JPL
839531	2014 QB_{574}	—	August 28, 2014	Haleakala	Pan-STARRS 1	·	2.2 km	MPC · JPL
839532	2014 QR_{575}	—	August 27, 2014	Haleakala	Pan-STARRS 1	·	1.3 km	MPC · JPL
839533	2014 QT_{577}	—	August 18, 2014	Haleakala	Pan-STARRS 1	ELF	2.7 km	MPC · JPL
839534	2014 QM_{579}	—	May 10, 2000	Sacramento Peak	SDSS	·	1.3 km	MPC · JPL
839535	2014 QE_{585}	—	August 23, 2014	Haleakala	Pan-STARRS 1	·	2.1 km	MPC · JPL
839536	2014 QT_{594}	—	August 22, 2014	Haleakala	Pan-STARRS 1	·	1.1 km	MPC · JPL
839537	2014 QT_{598}	—	February 27, 2012	Haleakala	Pan-STARRS 1	·	2.3 km	MPC · JPL
839538	2014 QS_{601}	—	August 30, 2014	Mount Lemmon	Mount Lemmon Survey	·	2.2 km	MPC · JPL
839539	2014 QS_{603}	—	August 19, 2014	Haleakala	Pan-STARRS 1	·	2.7 km	MPC · JPL
839540	2014 QG_{604}	—	August 23, 2014	Haleakala	Pan-STARRS 1	·	2.0 km	MPC · JPL
839541	2014 RN_{1}	—	January 30, 2004	Mauna Kea	Allen, R. L.	·	850 m	MPC · JPL
839542	2014 RM_{5}	—	August 19, 2014	Haleakala	Pan-STARRS 1	·	2.5 km	MPC · JPL
839543	2014 RT_{6}	—	March 30, 2010	WISE	WISE	·	3.0 km	MPC · JPL
839544	2014 RE_{8}	—	September 26, 2006	Kitt Peak	Spacewatch	(5)	760 m	MPC · JPL
839545	2014 RQ_{11}	—	May 12, 2010	WISE	WISE	·	2.1 km	MPC · JPL
839546	2014 RC_{12}	—	September 3, 2014	Mount Lemmon	Mount Lemmon Survey	AMO	610 m	MPC · JPL
839547	2014 RN_{14}	—	March 5, 2013	Haleakala	Pan-STARRS 1	·	1.3 km	MPC · JPL
839548	2014 RY_{16}	—	September 18, 2003	Kitt Peak	Spacewatch	·	2.5 km	MPC · JPL
839549	2014 RN_{21}	—	June 24, 2014	Haleakala	Pan-STARRS 1	·	1.9 km	MPC · JPL
839550	2014 RO_{22}	—	March 13, 2008	Kitt Peak	Spacewatch	H	350 m	MPC · JPL
839551	2014 RP_{24}	—	August 28, 2014	Haleakala	Pan-STARRS 1	·	2.2 km	MPC · JPL
839552	2014 RT_{24}	—	September 4, 2014	Haleakala	Pan-STARRS 1	·	2.0 km	MPC · JPL
839553	2014 RG_{29}	—	August 20, 2014	Haleakala	Pan-STARRS 1	THM	1.7 km	MPC · JPL
839554	2014 RQ_{29}	—	January 29, 2010	WISE	WISE	·	2.5 km	MPC · JPL
839555	2014 RE_{30}	—	March 8, 2013	Haleakala	Pan-STARRS 1	·	1.2 km	MPC · JPL
839556	2014 RX_{30}	—	September 15, 2014	Haleakala	Pan-STARRS 1	AMO	540 m	MPC · JPL
839557	2014 RN_{31}	—	June 18, 2010	WISE	WISE	·	1.5 km	MPC · JPL
839558	2014 RL_{32}	—	February 26, 2012	Roque de los Muchachos	EURONEAR	·	1.1 km	MPC · JPL
839559	2014 RH_{34}	—	January 28, 2010	WISE	WISE	T_{j} (2.98)	2.5 km	MPC · JPL
839560	2014 RW_{34}	—	August 28, 2014	Haleakala	Pan-STARRS 1	·	1.9 km	MPC · JPL
839561	2014 RL_{36}	—	September 12, 2014	Haleakala	Pan-STARRS 1	PHO	770 m	MPC · JPL
839562	2014 RB_{41}	—	December 1, 2011	Haleakala	Pan-STARRS 1	(883)	580 m	MPC · JPL
839563	2014 RF_{42}	—	January 29, 2010	WISE	WISE	·	2.0 km	MPC · JPL
839564	2014 RX_{42}	—	August 28, 2014	Haleakala	Pan-STARRS 1	T_{j} (2.92)	1.9 km	MPC · JPL
839565	2014 RZ_{44}	—	August 31, 2014	Haleakala	Pan-STARRS 1	·	520 m	MPC · JPL
839566	2014 RV_{50}	—	September 10, 2007	Kitt Peak	Spacewatch	·	520 m	MPC · JPL
839567	2014 RP_{53}	—	September 15, 2009	Kitt Peak	Spacewatch	·	2.0 km	MPC · JPL
839568	2014 RD_{54}	—	September 28, 2003	Sacramento Peak	SDSS	·	1.9 km	MPC · JPL
839569	2014 RH_{57}	—	September 15, 2014	Mount Lemmon	Mount Lemmon Survey	·	2.3 km	MPC · JPL
839570	2014 RV_{57}	—	September 18, 2009	Mount Lemmon	Mount Lemmon Survey	KOR	1.1 km	MPC · JPL
839571	2014 RW_{58}	—	September 15, 2014	Mount Lemmon	Mount Lemmon Survey	URS	2.6 km	MPC · JPL
839572	2014 RG_{59}	—	September 15, 2014	Mount Lemmon	Mount Lemmon Survey	KOR	890 m	MPC · JPL
839573	2014 RB_{60}	—	October 24, 2011	Haleakala	Pan-STARRS 1	·	390 m	MPC · JPL
839574	2014 RG_{60}	—	August 27, 2014	Haleakala	Pan-STARRS 1	THM	1.8 km	MPC · JPL
839575	2014 RZ_{61}	—	September 22, 2006	Catalina	CSS	·	960 m	MPC · JPL
839576	2014 RP_{65}	—	July 25, 2008	Mount Lemmon	Mount Lemmon Survey	·	2.0 km	MPC · JPL
839577	2014 RJ_{68}	—	September 18, 2010	Mount Lemmon	Mount Lemmon Survey	·	1.2 km	MPC · JPL
839578	2014 RG_{69}	—	September 11, 2014	Haleakala	Pan-STARRS 1	EUP	2.8 km	MPC · JPL
839579	2014 RT_{71}	—	September 13, 2014	Haleakala	Pan-STARRS 1	TIR	2.1 km	MPC · JPL
839580	2014 RX_{71}	—	February 7, 2010	WISE	WISE	·	3.3 km	MPC · JPL
839581	2014 RH_{72}	—	September 14, 2014	Mount Lemmon	Mount Lemmon Survey	·	2.9 km	MPC · JPL
839582	2014 RZ_{72}	—	September 9, 2014	Haleakala	Pan-STARRS 1	·	1.1 km	MPC · JPL
839583	2014 RB_{73}	—	September 5, 2014	Sutherland	Astronomical Research Institute	·	1.4 km	MPC · JPL
839584	2014 RL_{73}	—	September 2, 2014	Haleakala	Pan-STARRS 1	NEM	1.6 km	MPC · JPL
839585	2014 RA_{76}	—	September 2, 2014	Haleakala	Pan-STARRS 1	TIR	1.7 km	MPC · JPL
839586	2014 RL_{77}	—	September 1, 2014	Mount Lemmon	Mount Lemmon Survey	·	2.4 km	MPC · JPL
839587	2014 RX_{77}	—	September 2, 2014	Haleakala	Pan-STARRS 1	·	900 m	MPC · JPL
839588	2014 RX_{78}	—	September 2, 2014	Haleakala	Pan-STARRS 1	·	2.4 km	MPC · JPL
839589	2014 RZ_{78}	—	September 2, 2014	Haleakala	Pan-STARRS 1	VER	2.0 km	MPC · JPL
839590	2014 RB_{80}	—	September 2, 2014	Haleakala	Pan-STARRS 1	·	2.5 km	MPC · JPL
839591	2014 RD_{80}	—	September 3, 2014	Mount Lemmon	Mount Lemmon Survey	·	2.5 km	MPC · JPL
839592	2014 RJ_{80}	—	September 2, 2014	Haleakala	Pan-STARRS 1	EOS	1.6 km	MPC · JPL
839593	2014 RD_{81}	—	September 4, 2014	Haleakala	Pan-STARRS 1	TIR	1.6 km	MPC · JPL
839594	2014 RK_{81}	—	September 1, 2014	Mount Lemmon	Mount Lemmon Survey	·	2.1 km	MPC · JPL
839595	2014 RO_{81}	—	September 2, 2014	Haleakala	Pan-STARRS 1	T_{j} (2.98) · EUP	1.9 km	MPC · JPL
839596	2014 RC_{83}	—	September 2, 2014	Haleakala	Pan-STARRS 1	·	2.3 km	MPC · JPL
839597	2014 RO_{83}	—	September 2, 2014	Haleakala	Pan-STARRS 1	·	2.5 km	MPC · JPL
839598	2014 RE_{87}	—	September 2, 2014	Haleakala	Pan-STARRS 1	·	2.1 km	MPC · JPL
839599	2014 RP_{88}	—	September 15, 2014	Mount Lemmon	Mount Lemmon Survey	·	1.9 km	MPC · JPL
839600	2014 RW_{94}	—	September 2, 2014	Haleakala	Pan-STARRS 1	·	1.9 km	MPC · JPL

== 839601–839700 ==
back to top

Designation			Discovery			Properties		Ref
Permanent	Provisional	Named after	Date	Site	Discoverer(s)	Category	Diam.	Ref
839601	2014 SZ_{1}	—	March 15, 2012	Mount Lemmon	Mount Lemmon Survey	·	2.8 km	MPC · JPL
839602	2014 SN_{2}	—	July 7, 2014	Haleakala	Pan-STARRS 1	·	1.7 km	MPC · JPL
839603	2014 SR_{4}	—	September 18, 2009	Kitt Peak	Spacewatch	·	2.1 km	MPC · JPL
839604	2014 SC_{6}	—	August 23, 2014	Haleakala	Pan-STARRS 1	·	1.7 km	MPC · JPL
839605	2014 SS_{7}	—	October 2, 2003	Kitt Peak	Spacewatch	·	2.2 km	MPC · JPL
839606	2014 SB_{8}	—	October 22, 2003	Kitt Peak	Deep Ecliptic Survey	·	1.9 km	MPC · JPL
839607	2014 SU_{8}	—	September 19, 1998	Sacramento Peak	SDSS	EOS	1.5 km	MPC · JPL
839608	2014 SZ_{8}	—	October 13, 2010	Kitt Peak	Spacewatch	·	1.4 km	MPC · JPL
839609	2014 SY_{10}	—	August 23, 2014	Haleakala	Pan-STARRS 1	·	1.5 km	MPC · JPL
839610	2014 SC_{14}	—	August 22, 2014	Haleakala	Pan-STARRS 1	·	420 m	MPC · JPL
839611	2014 SE_{17}	—	August 20, 2014	Haleakala	Pan-STARRS 1	·	1.1 km	MPC · JPL
839612	2014 SL_{17}	—	August 20, 2014	Haleakala	Pan-STARRS 1	MRX	660 m	MPC · JPL
839613	2014 SK_{19}	—	August 27, 2014	Haleakala	Pan-STARRS 1	THM	1.5 km	MPC · JPL
839614	2014 SP_{20}	—	August 20, 2014	Haleakala	Pan-STARRS 1	·	1.8 km	MPC · JPL
839615	2014 SQ_{23}	—	September 21, 2003	Kitt Peak	Spacewatch	THM	1.6 km	MPC · JPL
839616	2014 SD_{27}	—	January 16, 2010	WISE	WISE	·	2.0 km	MPC · JPL
839617	2014 SY_{33}	—	March 27, 2010	WISE	WISE	THB	2.5 km	MPC · JPL
839618	2014 SV_{34}	—	October 12, 2010	Mount Lemmon	Mount Lemmon Survey	·	960 m	MPC · JPL
839619	2014 ST_{37}	—	August 27, 2014	Haleakala	Pan-STARRS 1	KOR	900 m	MPC · JPL
839620	2014 SH_{38}	—	September 17, 2014	Haleakala	Pan-STARRS 1	·	1.9 km	MPC · JPL
839621	2014 SX_{38}	—	September 17, 2014	Haleakala	Pan-STARRS 1	·	2.2 km	MPC · JPL
839622	2014 SP_{39}	—	January 26, 2011	Mount Lemmon	Mount Lemmon Survey	·	1.9 km	MPC · JPL
839623	2014 SJ_{40}	—	September 17, 2014	Haleakala	Pan-STARRS 1	VER	2.1 km	MPC · JPL
839624	2014 SA_{42}	—	September 17, 2014	Haleakala	Pan-STARRS 1	EOS	1.6 km	MPC · JPL
839625	2014 SK_{45}	—	October 22, 2009	Bisei	BATTeRS	·	2.2 km	MPC · JPL
839626	2014 SD_{47}	—	November 22, 2011	Mount Lemmon	Mount Lemmon Survey	·	540 m	MPC · JPL
839627	2014 SP_{47}	—	August 28, 2014	Haleakala	Pan-STARRS 1	·	2.2 km	MPC · JPL
839628	2014 SS_{52}	—	August 23, 2014	Haleakala	Pan-STARRS 1	·	2.3 km	MPC · JPL
839629	2014 SH_{54}	—	August 28, 2014	Haleakala	Pan-STARRS 1	·	2.2 km	MPC · JPL
839630	2014 SN_{54}	—	August 28, 2014	Haleakala	Pan-STARRS 1	·	2.4 km	MPC · JPL
839631	2014 SA_{55}	—	August 28, 2014	Haleakala	Pan-STARRS 1	·	770 m	MPC · JPL
839632	2014 SA_{58}	—	February 7, 2011	Mount Lemmon	Mount Lemmon Survey	VER	2.0 km	MPC · JPL
839633	2014 SX_{58}	—	August 20, 2014	Haleakala	Pan-STARRS 1	·	2.0 km	MPC · JPL
839634	2014 SQ_{59}	—	August 22, 2014	Haleakala	Pan-STARRS 1	·	1.9 km	MPC · JPL
839635	2014 ST_{60}	—	June 16, 2013	Haleakala	Pan-STARRS 1	EOS	1.5 km	MPC · JPL
839636	2014 SU_{65}	—	January 26, 2012	Mount Lemmon	Mount Lemmon Survey	·	790 m	MPC · JPL
839637	2014 SV_{67}	—	August 28, 2014	Haleakala	Pan-STARRS 1	·	2.1 km	MPC · JPL
839638	2014 SY_{68}	—	June 22, 2010	WISE	WISE	·	990 m	MPC · JPL
839639	2014 SK_{69}	—	August 20, 2014	Haleakala	Pan-STARRS 1	·	2.0 km	MPC · JPL
839640	2014 SO_{69}	—	September 28, 2009	Mount Lemmon	Mount Lemmon Survey	·	1.8 km	MPC · JPL
839641	2014 SS_{71}	—	September 16, 2003	Kitt Peak	Spacewatch	·	2.8 km	MPC · JPL
839642	2014 SW_{71}	—	September 28, 1998	Kitt Peak	Spacewatch	·	2.2 km	MPC · JPL
839643	2014 SO_{72}	—	October 26, 2009	Kitt Peak	Spacewatch	·	1.8 km	MPC · JPL
839644	2014 SG_{73}	—	October 29, 2011	Kitt Peak	Spacewatch	·	510 m	MPC · JPL
839645	2014 SS_{78}	—	August 3, 2014	Haleakala	Pan-STARRS 1	EOS	1.4 km	MPC · JPL
839646	2014 SZ_{78}	—	August 28, 2014	Haleakala	Pan-STARRS 1	·	1.2 km	MPC · JPL
839647	2014 SY_{79}	—	August 28, 2014	Haleakala	Pan-STARRS 1	VER	1.9 km	MPC · JPL
839648	2014 ST_{81}	—	August 31, 2014	Mount Lemmon	Mount Lemmon Survey	EOS	1.4 km	MPC · JPL
839649	2014 SS_{82}	—	September 18, 2014	Haleakala	Pan-STARRS 1	·	2.1 km	MPC · JPL
839650	2014 SQ_{87}	—	July 29, 2014	Haleakala	Pan-STARRS 1	(895)	3.2 km	MPC · JPL
839651	2014 SL_{89}	—	February 24, 2006	Kitt Peak	Spacewatch	·	2.3 km	MPC · JPL
839652	2014 SS_{89}	—	August 27, 2014	Haleakala	Pan-STARRS 1	·	1.9 km	MPC · JPL
839653	2014 SX_{89}	—	April 16, 2007	Mount Lemmon	Mount Lemmon Survey	·	1.9 km	MPC · JPL
839654	2014 SF_{90}	—	August 27, 2014	Haleakala	Pan-STARRS 1	·	2.1 km	MPC · JPL
839655	2014 SO_{95}	—	October 1, 2005	Kitt Peak	Spacewatch	·	1.4 km	MPC · JPL
839656	2014 SU_{96}	—	August 27, 2014	Haleakala	Pan-STARRS 1	·	1.5 km	MPC · JPL
839657	2014 SG_{100}	—	March 2, 2011	Mount Lemmon	Mount Lemmon Survey	·	1.8 km	MPC · JPL
839658	2014 SB_{104}	—	February 11, 2011	Mount Lemmon	Mount Lemmon Survey	·	2.3 km	MPC · JPL
839659	2014 SL_{109}	—	September 18, 2014	Haleakala	Pan-STARRS 1	·	2.1 km	MPC · JPL
839660	2014 SR_{110}	—	September 18, 2014	Haleakala	Pan-STARRS 1	·	630 m	MPC · JPL
839661	2014 SJ_{118}	—	March 11, 2007	Mount Lemmon	Mount Lemmon Survey	·	1.8 km	MPC · JPL
839662	2014 SH_{121}	—	March 20, 1999	Sacramento Peak	SDSS	·	590 m	MPC · JPL
839663	2014 SZ_{122}	—	September 18, 2014	Haleakala	Pan-STARRS 1	NEM	1.6 km	MPC · JPL
839664	2014 SD_{130}	—	August 28, 2014	Kitt Peak	Spacewatch	·	2.2 km	MPC · JPL
839665	2014 SV_{130}	—	August 27, 2014	Haleakala	Pan-STARRS 1	·	750 m	MPC · JPL
839666	2014 SZ_{132}	—	September 18, 2014	Haleakala	Pan-STARRS 1	·	470 m	MPC · JPL
839667	2014 SZ_{133}	—	October 26, 2009	Kitt Peak	Spacewatch	·	2.3 km	MPC · JPL
839668	2014 SG_{134}	—	October 12, 2010	Mount Lemmon	Mount Lemmon Survey	·	730 m	MPC · JPL
839669	2014 SZ_{134}	—	January 5, 2010	Kitt Peak	Spacewatch	H	500 m	MPC · JPL
839670	2014 SR_{136}	—	January 21, 2010	WISE	WISE	EUP	2.2 km	MPC · JPL
839671	2014 SF_{139}	—	October 16, 2009	Mount Lemmon	Mount Lemmon Survey	KOR	1.1 km	MPC · JPL
839672	2014 SF_{141}	—	September 19, 2006	Anderson Mesa	LONEOS	T_{j} (2.95)	3.3 km	MPC · JPL
839673	2014 SE_{148}	—	September 7, 2014	Haleakala	Pan-STARRS 1	·	2.2 km	MPC · JPL
839674	2014 ST_{149}	—	August 28, 2014	Haleakala	Pan-STARRS 1	·	680 m	MPC · JPL
839675	2014 SS_{153}	—	March 24, 2006	Mount Lemmon	Mount Lemmon Survey	·	3.4 km	MPC · JPL
839676	2014 ST_{156}	—	September 19, 2014	Haleakala	Pan-STARRS 1	·	1.2 km	MPC · JPL
839677	2014 SA_{161}	—	October 30, 2009	Mount Lemmon	Mount Lemmon Survey	·	1.5 km	MPC · JPL
839678	2014 SP_{166}	—	September 14, 2014	Kitt Peak	Spacewatch	·	1.9 km	MPC · JPL
839679	2014 SW_{166}	—	September 6, 2008	Mount Lemmon	Mount Lemmon Survey	·	2.4 km	MPC · JPL
839680	2014 SH_{168}	—	March 4, 2010	WISE	WISE	·	2.3 km	MPC · JPL
839681	2014 SK_{168}	—	September 20, 2014	Mount Lemmon	Mount Lemmon Survey	·	2.3 km	MPC · JPL
839682	2014 SD_{169}	—	January 14, 2010	WISE	WISE	·	2.2 km	MPC · JPL
839683	2014 SX_{169}	—	September 20, 2014	Haleakala	Pan-STARRS 1	URS	2.6 km	MPC · JPL
839684	2014 SB_{170}	—	December 18, 2003	Socorro	LINEAR	THB	2.1 km	MPC · JPL
839685	2014 SM_{170}	—	November 12, 2009	Zelenchukskaya	T. V. Krjačko, B. Satovski	·	2.3 km	MPC · JPL
839686	2014 SB_{172}	—	September 16, 2010	Mount Lemmon	Mount Lemmon Survey	·	1.3 km	MPC · JPL
839687	2014 SP_{172}	—	September 24, 2009	Kitt Peak	Spacewatch	·	1.6 km	MPC · JPL
839688	2014 SG_{175}	—	August 27, 2014	Haleakala	Pan-STARRS 1	·	2.1 km	MPC · JPL
839689	2014 SL_{176}	—	September 21, 2003	Campo Imperatore	CINEOS	·	2.1 km	MPC · JPL
839690	2014 SQ_{176}	—	March 3, 2010	WISE	WISE	·	1.7 km	MPC · JPL
839691	2014 SB_{177}	—	July 28, 2010	WISE	WISE	·	600 m	MPC · JPL
839692	2014 SE_{177}	—	September 26, 2003	Sacramento Peak	SDSS	·	2.3 km	MPC · JPL
839693	2014 SS_{178}	—	September 20, 2014	Haleakala	Pan-STARRS 1	·	1.0 km	MPC · JPL
839694	2014 SU_{179}	—	November 17, 2009	Kitt Peak	Spacewatch	·	1.8 km	MPC · JPL
839695	2014 SR_{186}	—	January 13, 2008	Kitt Peak	Spacewatch	·	870 m	MPC · JPL
839696	2014 SQ_{190}	—	June 7, 2013	Haleakala	Pan-STARRS 1	·	1.7 km	MPC · JPL
839697	2014 SB_{198}	—	May 4, 2000	Sacramento Peak	SDSS	·	1.4 km	MPC · JPL
839698	2014 SK_{203}	—	September 20, 2014	Haleakala	Pan-STARRS 1	·	2.2 km	MPC · JPL
839699	2014 SA_{207}	—	October 26, 2008	Mount Lemmon	Mount Lemmon Survey	EUP	2.9 km	MPC · JPL
839700	2014 SB_{209}	—	February 9, 2011	Mount Lemmon	Mount Lemmon Survey	·	1.1 km	MPC · JPL

== 839701–839800 ==
back to top

Designation			Discovery			Properties		Ref
Permanent	Provisional	Named after	Date	Site	Discoverer(s)	Category	Diam.	Ref
839701	2014 SW_{213}	—	September 4, 2014	Haleakala	Pan-STARRS 1	·	1.0 km	MPC · JPL
839702	2014 SO_{217}	—	September 20, 2014	Haleakala	Pan-STARRS 1	·	2.5 km	MPC · JPL
839703	2014 SX_{217}	—	October 23, 2003	Sacramento Peak	SDSS	·	1 km	MPC · JPL
839704	2014 SD_{218}	—	October 29, 2010	Catalina	CSS	·	1.0 km	MPC · JPL
839705	2014 SH_{222}	—	February 15, 2010	WISE	WISE	·	3.3 km	MPC · JPL
839706	2014 SN_{222}	—	September 22, 2014	Kitt Peak	Spacewatch	·	510 m	MPC · JPL
839707	2014 SZ_{237}	—	May 30, 2014	Mount Lemmon	Mount Lemmon Survey	·	1.4 km	MPC · JPL
839708	2014 SZ_{240}	—	August 20, 2014	Haleakala	Pan-STARRS 1	·	1.8 km	MPC · JPL
839709	2014 SW_{245}	—	July 15, 2010	WISE	WISE	·	900 m	MPC · JPL
839710	2014 SB_{246}	—	July 31, 2014	Haleakala	Pan-STARRS 1	·	2.2 km	MPC · JPL
839711	2014 SS_{246}	—	July 31, 2014	Haleakala	Pan-STARRS 1	·	1.5 km	MPC · JPL
839712	2014 SA_{248}	—	July 31, 2014	Haleakala	Pan-STARRS 1	T_{j} (2.98) · EUP	2.5 km	MPC · JPL
839713	2014 SN_{248}	—	January 14, 2010	WISE	WISE	·	1.4 km	MPC · JPL
839714	2014 SQ_{248}	—	July 31, 2014	Haleakala	Pan-STARRS 1	·	2.4 km	MPC · JPL
839715	2014 SS_{252}	—	September 2, 2014	Haleakala	Pan-STARRS 1	V	500 m	MPC · JPL
839716	2014 SS_{255}	—	September 27, 2003	Kitt Peak	Spacewatch	·	1.9 km	MPC · JPL
839717	2014 SX_{255}	—	March 16, 2012	Mount Lemmon	Mount Lemmon Survey	·	1.3 km	MPC · JPL
839718	2014 SA_{256}	—	October 12, 2009	Mount Lemmon	Mount Lemmon Survey	·	1.5 km	MPC · JPL
839719	2014 SP_{257}	—	July 28, 2008	Mount Lemmon	Mount Lemmon Survey	TIR	1.9 km	MPC · JPL
839720	2014 SH_{258}	—	November 28, 2011	Kitt Peak	Spacewatch	·	530 m	MPC · JPL
839721	2014 SV_{262}	—	December 27, 2006	Mount Lemmon	Mount Lemmon Survey	·	320 m	MPC · JPL
839722	2014 SB_{264}	—	March 5, 2011	Mount Lemmon	Mount Lemmon Survey	·	1.8 km	MPC · JPL
839723	2014 SB_{265}	—	August 27, 2014	Haleakala	Pan-STARRS 1	EUN	1.0 km	MPC · JPL
839724	2014 SX_{265}	—	September 20, 2003	Palomar	NEAT	·	2.0 km	MPC · JPL
839725	2014 SS_{267}	—	August 27, 2014	Haleakala	Pan-STARRS 1	·	1.9 km	MPC · JPL
839726	2014 SN_{268}	—	April 2, 2013	Mount Lemmon	Mount Lemmon Survey	·	1.2 km	MPC · JPL
839727	2014 SC_{274}	—	April 4, 2010	WISE	WISE	THB	1.7 km	MPC · JPL
839728	2014 SP_{274}	—	December 18, 2001	Sacramento Peak	SDSS	·	2.1 km	MPC · JPL
839729	2014 SM_{275}	—	November 2, 2007	Kitt Peak	Spacewatch	NYS	660 m	MPC · JPL
839730	2014 SV_{275}	—	December 15, 2010	Mount Lemmon	Mount Lemmon Survey	·	980 m	MPC · JPL
839731	2014 SD_{282}	—	April 12, 2010	WISE	WISE	T_{j} (2.99)	2.8 km	MPC · JPL
839732	2014 SV_{283}	—	September 2, 2014	Haleakala	Pan-STARRS 1	·	2.3 km	MPC · JPL
839733	2014 SW_{284}	—	December 18, 2001	Kitt Peak	Deep Lens Survey	·	1.2 km	MPC · JPL
839734	2014 SR_{286}	—	September 20, 2003	Kitt Peak	Spacewatch	·	2.1 km	MPC · JPL
839735	2014 SL_{287}	—	December 5, 2007	Kitt Peak	Spacewatch	ERI	1.1 km	MPC · JPL
839736	2014 SD_{293}	—	August 6, 2014	Haleakala	Pan-STARRS 1	·	2.4 km	MPC · JPL
839737	2014 SP_{293}	—	September 25, 2014	Mount Lemmon	Mount Lemmon Survey	·	1.4 km	MPC · JPL
839738	2014 SG_{294}	—	June 6, 2010	WISE	WISE	·	940 m	MPC · JPL
839739	2014 SJ_{294}	—	October 30, 2009	Mount Lemmon	Mount Lemmon Survey	ELF	3.2 km	MPC · JPL
839740	2014 SL_{296}	—	August 28, 2014	Haleakala	Pan-STARRS 1	·	2.0 km	MPC · JPL
839741	2014 SB_{298}	—	October 25, 2003	Socorro	LINEAR	·	920 m	MPC · JPL
839742	2014 SH_{305}	—	November 3, 1999	Kitt Peak	Spacewatch	NYS	820 m	MPC · JPL
839743	2014 SH_{310}	—	September 14, 1993	La Silla	H. Debehogne, E. W. Elst	·	1.7 km	MPC · JPL
839744	2014 SO_{311}	—	August 18, 2014	Haleakala	Pan-STARRS 1	NYS	1.0 km	MPC · JPL
839745	2014 SC_{312}	—	July 11, 2010	WISE	WISE	·	2.3 km	MPC · JPL
839746	2014 SW_{317}	—	December 18, 2003	Kitt Peak	Spacewatch	LIX	3.0 km	MPC · JPL
839747	2014 SB_{319}	—	February 1, 2010	WISE	WISE	·	4.3 km	MPC · JPL
839748	2014 SH_{320}	—	September 3, 2014	Mount Lemmon	Mount Lemmon Survey	·	1.3 km	MPC · JPL
839749	2014 SO_{326}	—	December 2, 2010	Mount Lemmon	Mount Lemmon Survey	·	960 m	MPC · JPL
839750	2014 SN_{328}	—	September 26, 2014	Catalina	CSS	EUN	920 m	MPC · JPL
839751	2014 ST_{328}	—	September 26, 2014	Catalina	CSS	·	2.0 km	MPC · JPL
839752	2014 SZ_{330}	—	May 31, 2010	WISE	WISE	·	950 m	MPC · JPL
839753	2014 SY_{332}	—	September 10, 2004	Kitt Peak	Spacewatch	·	1.2 km	MPC · JPL
839754	2014 SB_{337}	—	July 31, 2014	Haleakala	Pan-STARRS 1	·	2.3 km	MPC · JPL
839755	2014 SF_{337}	—	September 30, 2014	Kitt Peak	Spacewatch	·	460 m	MPC · JPL
839756	2014 SS_{346}	—	September 28, 2003	Kitt Peak	Spacewatch	·	1.9 km	MPC · JPL
839757	2014 SA_{352}	—	September 18, 2014	Haleakala	Pan-STARRS 1	BRA	1.3 km	MPC · JPL
839758	2014 SK_{352}	—	September 19, 2014	Haleakala	Pan-STARRS 1	·	2.6 km	MPC · JPL
839759	2014 SU_{354}	—	September 18, 2014	Haleakala	Pan-STARRS 1	·	1.9 km	MPC · JPL
839760	2014 SW_{354}	—	July 30, 2008	Mount Lemmon	Mount Lemmon Survey	THM	1.6 km	MPC · JPL
839761	2014 SY_{356}	—	September 17, 2014	Haleakala	Pan-STARRS 1	KOR	930 m	MPC · JPL
839762	2014 SA_{359}	—	April 1, 2012	Mount Lemmon	Mount Lemmon Survey	·	2.6 km	MPC · JPL
839763	2014 SE_{359}	—	October 23, 2006	Kitt Peak	Spacewatch	MAR	720 m	MPC · JPL
839764	2014 SB_{360}	—	March 27, 2012	Kitt Peak	Spacewatch	·	2.2 km	MPC · JPL
839765	2014 SB_{366}	—	September 19, 2014	Haleakala	Pan-STARRS 1	·	750 m	MPC · JPL
839766	2014 SK_{366}	—	November 22, 2014	Mount Lemmon	Mount Lemmon Survey	·	2.4 km	MPC · JPL
839767	2014 SX_{368}	—	September 22, 2014	Haleakala	Pan-STARRS 1	·	990 m	MPC · JPL
839768	2014 SZ_{369}	—	September 25, 2014	Mount Lemmon	Mount Lemmon Survey	H	360 m	MPC · JPL
839769	2014 SD_{374}	—	September 24, 2014	Mount Lemmon	Mount Lemmon Survey	THM	1.8 km	MPC · JPL
839770	2014 SY_{374}	—	September 19, 2014	Haleakala	Pan-STARRS 1	HYG	2.2 km	MPC · JPL
839771	2014 SS_{378}	—	September 25, 2014	Kitt Peak	Spacewatch	·	1.4 km	MPC · JPL
839772	2014 SO_{379}	—	September 20, 2014	Haleakala	Pan-STARRS 1	·	820 m	MPC · JPL
839773	2014 ST_{381}	—	September 23, 2014	Mount Lemmon	Mount Lemmon Survey	·	2.0 km	MPC · JPL
839774	2014 SQ_{382}	—	September 23, 2014	Haleakala	Pan-STARRS 1	·	1.1 km	MPC · JPL
839775	2014 SB_{384}	—	September 20, 2014	Haleakala	Pan-STARRS 1	·	2.0 km	MPC · JPL
839776	2014 SB_{386}	—	September 24, 2008	Catalina	CSS	·	2.6 km	MPC · JPL
839777	2014 SU_{389}	—	September 19, 2014	Haleakala	Pan-STARRS 1	critical	1.8 km	MPC · JPL
839778	2014 SY_{389}	—	September 17, 2014	Haleakala	Pan-STARRS 1	·	2.0 km	MPC · JPL
839779	2014 SH_{397}	—	September 25, 2014	Kitt Peak	Spacewatch	·	1.1 km	MPC · JPL
839780	2014 SV_{399}	—	September 19, 2014	Haleakala	Pan-STARRS 1	V	360 m	MPC · JPL
839781	2014 SB_{417}	—	September 28, 2014	Haleakala	Pan-STARRS 1	·	2.2 km	MPC · JPL
839782	2014 SY_{424}	—	September 20, 2014	Haleakala	Pan-STARRS 1	·	2.0 km	MPC · JPL
839783	2014 SR_{434}	—	September 21, 2009	Mount Lemmon	Mount Lemmon Survey	·	1.3 km	MPC · JPL
839784	2014 TO	—	October 2, 2014	Catalina	CSS	·	380 m	MPC · JPL
839785	2014 TV_{2}	—	March 17, 2010	WISE	WISE	·	2.0 km	MPC · JPL
839786	2014 TU_{11}	—	October 1, 2014	Haleakala	Pan-STARRS 1	·	1.9 km	MPC · JPL
839787	2014 TT_{12}	—	October 1, 2014	Haleakala	Pan-STARRS 1	·	2.0 km	MPC · JPL
839788	2014 TP_{13}	—	September 25, 2014	Kitt Peak	Spacewatch	·	910 m	MPC · JPL
839789	2014 TT_{14}	—	November 22, 2005	Kitt Peak	Spacewatch	·	1.4 km	MPC · JPL
839790	2014 TR_{15}	—	September 25, 2014	Kitt Peak	Spacewatch	·	2.5 km	MPC · JPL
839791	2014 TX_{15}	—	September 19, 2014	Haleakala	Pan-STARRS 1	·	2.0 km	MPC · JPL
839792	2014 TW_{23}	—	January 28, 2010	WISE	WISE	·	2.3 km	MPC · JPL
839793	2014 TQ_{26}	—	April 19, 2012	Mount Lemmon	Mount Lemmon Survey	·	2.6 km	MPC · JPL
839794	2014 TY_{27}	—	October 8, 2007	Mount Lemmon	Mount Lemmon Survey	NYS	680 m	MPC · JPL
839795	2014 TZ_{30}	—	September 6, 2008	Mount Lemmon	Mount Lemmon Survey	·	1.9 km	MPC · JPL
839796	2014 TL_{31}	—	November 12, 2005	Kitt Peak	Spacewatch	·	1.3 km	MPC · JPL
839797	2014 TE_{36}	—	March 1, 1992	La Silla	UESAC	PHO	1.6 km	MPC · JPL
839798	2014 TW_{38}	—	September 25, 2014	Catalina	CSS	·	1.2 km	MPC · JPL
839799	2014 TC_{41}	—	August 28, 2014	Haleakala	Pan-STARRS 1	·	3.6 km	MPC · JPL
839800	2014 TL_{42}	—	October 1, 2010	Mount Lemmon	Mount Lemmon Survey	·	1.0 km	MPC · JPL

== 839801–839900 ==
back to top

Designation			Discovery			Properties		Ref
Permanent	Provisional	Named after	Date	Site	Discoverer(s)	Category	Diam.	Ref
839801	2014 TV_{42}	—	September 2, 2014	Haleakala	Pan-STARRS 1	HYG	2.0 km	MPC · JPL
839802	2014 TD_{46}	—	October 25, 2009	Kitt Peak	Spacewatch	·	1.2 km	MPC · JPL
839803	2014 TT_{48}	—	November 18, 2009	Kitt Peak	Spacewatch	·	1.2 km	MPC · JPL
839804	2014 TJ_{49}	—	August 20, 2014	Haleakala	Pan-STARRS 1	·	2.3 km	MPC · JPL
839805	2014 TO_{49}	—	October 14, 2014	Mount Lemmon	Mount Lemmon Survey	·	1.8 km	MPC · JPL
839806	2014 TJ_{54}	—	September 22, 2014	Haleakala	Pan-STARRS 1	·	540 m	MPC · JPL
839807	2014 TB_{56}	—	September 6, 2008	Kitt Peak	Spacewatch	·	2.3 km	MPC · JPL
839808	2014 TC_{61}	—	February 12, 2010	WISE	WISE	·	1.7 km	MPC · JPL
839809	2014 TJ_{65}	—	October 25, 2003	Kitt Peak	Spacewatch	THB	2.2 km	MPC · JPL
839810	2014 TO_{65}	—	September 2, 2014	Haleakala	Pan-STARRS 1	·	1.3 km	MPC · JPL
839811	2014 TL_{70}	—	September 7, 2008	Mount Lemmon	Mount Lemmon Survey	·	2.1 km	MPC · JPL
839812	2014 TW_{70}	—	September 23, 2008	Mount Lemmon	Mount Lemmon Survey	·	2.2 km	MPC · JPL
839813	2014 TO_{71}	—	September 4, 2014	Haleakala	Pan-STARRS 1	·	2.2 km	MPC · JPL
839814	2014 TS_{75}	—	September 19, 2014	Haleakala	Pan-STARRS 1	·	500 m	MPC · JPL
839815	2014 TA_{77}	—	September 30, 2014	Kitt Peak	Spacewatch	·	2.0 km	MPC · JPL
839816	2014 TO_{77}	—	October 14, 2014	Mount Lemmon	Mount Lemmon Survey	EOS	1.3 km	MPC · JPL
839817	2014 TR_{84}	—	August 4, 2013	Haleakala	Pan-STARRS 1	·	1.6 km	MPC · JPL
839818	2014 TT_{84}	—	November 16, 2009	Mount Lemmon	Mount Lemmon Survey	(16286)	1.8 km	MPC · JPL
839819	2014 TB_{87}	—	January 6, 2010	Kitt Peak	Spacewatch	·	2.4 km	MPC · JPL
839820	2014 TJ_{87}	—	October 3, 2014	Mount Lemmon	Mount Lemmon Survey	·	810 m	MPC · JPL
839821	2014 TV_{88}	—	October 1, 2014	Kitt Peak	Spacewatch	THM	1.8 km	MPC · JPL
839822	2014 TD_{89}	—	November 2, 2008	Mount Lemmon	Mount Lemmon Survey	·	1.7 km	MPC · JPL
839823	2014 TG_{91}	—	August 26, 2000	Cerro Tololo	Deep Ecliptic Survey	·	1.7 km	MPC · JPL
839824	2014 TM_{93}	—	October 3, 2014	Mount Lemmon	Mount Lemmon Survey	·	1.1 km	MPC · JPL
839825	2014 TS_{93}	—	August 24, 2008	Kitt Peak	Spacewatch	·	2.2 km	MPC · JPL
839826	2014 TL_{94}	—	October 5, 2014	Mount Lemmon	Mount Lemmon Survey	EOS	1.4 km	MPC · JPL
839827	2014 TD_{95}	—	October 14, 2014	Kitt Peak	Spacewatch	·	2.1 km	MPC · JPL
839828	2014 TC_{97}	—	October 12, 2014	Mount Lemmon	Mount Lemmon Survey	·	2.5 km	MPC · JPL
839829	2014 TU_{97}	—	October 3, 2014	Mount Lemmon	Mount Lemmon Survey	TIR	2.1 km	MPC · JPL
839830	2014 TJ_{98}	—	January 25, 2010	WISE	WISE	·	1.7 km	MPC · JPL
839831	2014 TX_{98}	—	October 2, 2014	Haleakala	Pan-STARRS 1	·	2.5 km	MPC · JPL
839832	2014 TO_{99}	—	March 12, 2016	Haleakala	Pan-STARRS 1	·	550 m	MPC · JPL
839833	2014 TV_{99}	—	October 2, 2014	Haleakala	Pan-STARRS 1	·	2.3 km	MPC · JPL
839834	2014 TN_{101}	—	October 1, 2014	Haleakala	Pan-STARRS 1	·	2.1 km	MPC · JPL
839835	2014 TN_{107}	—	October 15, 2014	Kitt Peak	Spacewatch	·	700 m	MPC · JPL
839836	2014 TF_{108}	—	October 1, 2014	Haleakala	Pan-STARRS 1	·	2.6 km	MPC · JPL
839837	2014 TM_{108}	—	October 1, 2014	Haleakala	Pan-STARRS 1	THB	1.8 km	MPC · JPL
839838	2014 TA_{109}	—	October 2, 2014	Haleakala	Pan-STARRS 1	·	2.7 km	MPC · JPL
839839	2014 TU_{114}	—	October 3, 2014	Mount Lemmon	Mount Lemmon Survey	V	480 m	MPC · JPL
839840	2014 TN_{120}	—	October 14, 2014	Kitt Peak	Spacewatch	(5)	890 m	MPC · JPL
839841	2014 TC_{124}	—	October 2, 2014	Haleakala	Pan-STARRS 1	·	2.0 km	MPC · JPL
839842	2014 UD_{1}	—	October 16, 2014	Kitt Peak	Spacewatch	·	360 m	MPC · JPL
839843	2014 UC_{13}	—	April 2, 2010	WISE	WISE	·	3.1 km	MPC · JPL
839844	2014 UA_{15}	—	August 26, 2009	Catalina	CSS	·	1.3 km	MPC · JPL
839845	2014 UU_{15}	—	November 22, 2009	Mount Lemmon	Mount Lemmon Survey	LIX	4.1 km	MPC · JPL
839846	2014 UW_{20}	—	January 25, 2010	WISE	WISE	·	1.9 km	MPC · JPL
839847	2014 UN_{21}	—	August 20, 2006	Palomar	NEAT	·	1.1 km	MPC · JPL
839848	2014 UG_{23}	—	October 30, 2002	Sacramento Peak	SDSS	·	2.6 km	MPC · JPL
839849	2014 UY_{31}	—	March 9, 2005	Mount Lemmon	Mount Lemmon Survey	(895)	3.7 km	MPC · JPL
839850	2014 UQ_{32}	—	March 12, 2005	Kitt Peak	Deep Ecliptic Survey	·	750 m	MPC · JPL
839851	2014 UN_{44}	—	September 16, 2009	Mount Lemmon	Mount Lemmon Survey	·	1.4 km	MPC · JPL
839852	2014 UE_{48}	—	September 24, 2014	Kitt Peak	Spacewatch	·	900 m	MPC · JPL
839853	2014 UL_{49}	—	October 21, 2014	Kitt Peak	Spacewatch	·	2.6 km	MPC · JPL
839854	2014 UZ_{50}	—	May 3, 2010	WISE	WISE	·	2.5 km	MPC · JPL
839855	2014 UX_{51}	—	October 22, 2014	Nogales	M. Schwartz, P. R. Holvorcem	·	2.0 km	MPC · JPL
839856	2014 UV_{53}	—	May 21, 2010	WISE	WISE	·	1.2 km	MPC · JPL
839857	2014 UX_{55}	—	March 16, 2010	WISE	WISE	·	2.3 km	MPC · JPL
839858	2014 UR_{61}	—	September 18, 2014	Haleakala	Pan-STARRS 1	·	2.3 km	MPC · JPL
839859	2014 UW_{61}	—	September 24, 2014	Mount Lemmon	Mount Lemmon Survey	PHO	690 m	MPC · JPL
839860	2014 UJ_{66}	—	September 3, 2010	Mount Lemmon	Mount Lemmon Survey	NYS	650 m	MPC · JPL
839861	2014 UF_{68}	—	March 21, 1999	Sacramento Peak	SDSS	·	2.2 km	MPC · JPL
839862	2014 UR_{74}	—	March 27, 2010	WISE	WISE	·	3.0 km	MPC · JPL
839863	2014 UU_{76}	—	February 3, 2010	WISE	WISE	TEL	960 m	MPC · JPL
839864	2014 UL_{79}	—	September 24, 2014	Kitt Peak	Spacewatch	THB	1.8 km	MPC · JPL
839865	2014 UE_{86}	—	October 21, 2014	Mount Lemmon	Mount Lemmon Survey	MAS	540 m	MPC · JPL
839866	2014 UJ_{87}	—	October 23, 2009	Kitt Peak	Spacewatch	·	1.2 km	MPC · JPL
839867	2014 UR_{87}	—	October 7, 2008	Mount Lemmon	Mount Lemmon Survey	·	2.4 km	MPC · JPL
839868	2014 UN_{90}	—	October 22, 2014	Kitt Peak	Spacewatch	·	2.0 km	MPC · JPL
839869	2014 UG_{94}	—	March 16, 2010	WISE	WISE	·	2.6 km	MPC · JPL
839870	2014 UD_{96}	—	October 15, 2014	Mount Lemmon	Mount Lemmon Survey	·	860 m	MPC · JPL
839871	2014 UZ_{98}	—	October 23, 2014	Kitt Peak	Spacewatch	EOS	1.4 km	MPC · JPL
839872	2014 UQ_{101}	—	September 19, 2014	Haleakala	Pan-STARRS 1	·	520 m	MPC · JPL
839873	2014 UB_{104}	—	October 24, 2014	Kitt Peak	Spacewatch	·	2.1 km	MPC · JPL
839874	2014 UQ_{105}	—	April 13, 2010	WISE	WISE	·	2.6 km	MPC · JPL
839875	2014 UD_{106}	—	October 24, 2014	Kitt Peak	Spacewatch	·	770 m	MPC · JPL
839876	2014 UG_{106}	—	October 22, 2014	Catalina	CSS	·	950 m	MPC · JPL
839877	2014 UC_{109}	—	October 14, 2001	Sacramento Peak	SDSS	·	1.2 km	MPC · JPL
839878	2014 UR_{109}	—	October 14, 2010	Mount Lemmon	Mount Lemmon Survey	KON	1.3 km	MPC · JPL
839879	2014 UF_{110}	—	August 22, 2003	Campo Imperatore	CINEOS	·	2.0 km	MPC · JPL
839880	2014 UW_{110}	—	October 14, 2009	Mount Lemmon	Mount Lemmon Survey	·	1.9 km	MPC · JPL
839881	2014 US_{111}	—	October 2, 2014	Haleakala	Pan-STARRS 1	·	1.3 km	MPC · JPL
839882	2014 UJ_{112}	—	August 30, 2014	Haleakala	Pan-STARRS 1	·	590 m	MPC · JPL
839883	2014 UN_{113}	—	February 12, 2008	Kitt Peak	Spacewatch	NYS	910 m	MPC · JPL
839884	2014 UQ_{115}	—	September 9, 2014	Haleakala	Pan-STARRS 1	·	750 m	MPC · JPL
839885	2014 UA_{116}	—	October 27, 2014	Haleakala	Pan-STARRS 1	H	470 m	MPC · JPL
839886	2014 UP_{116}	—	April 25, 2003	Kitt Peak	Spacewatch	H	500 m	MPC · JPL
839887	2014 UB_{118}	—	August 24, 2014	Haleakala	Pan-STARRS 1	·	870 m	MPC · JPL
839888	2014 UJ_{119}	—	October 22, 2014	Kitt Peak	Spacewatch	MAS	450 m	MPC · JPL
839889	2014 US_{121}	—	October 3, 2014	Mount Lemmon	Mount Lemmon Survey	TIR	2.3 km	MPC · JPL
839890	2014 UF_{122}	—	March 1, 2010	WISE	WISE	·	2.1 km	MPC · JPL
839891	2014 US_{122}	—	March 19, 2010	WISE	WISE	·	4.1 km	MPC · JPL
839892	2014 UX_{123}	—	October 13, 2010	Mount Lemmon	Mount Lemmon Survey	·	810 m	MPC · JPL
839893	2014 UN_{124}	—	September 30, 2003	Kitt Peak	Spacewatch	·	2.1 km	MPC · JPL
839894	2014 UU_{124}	—	March 4, 2006	Mount Lemmon	Mount Lemmon Survey	·	1.7 km	MPC · JPL
839895	2014 UQ_{129}	—	March 4, 2010	WISE	WISE	·	2.5 km	MPC · JPL
839896	2014 UT_{132}	—	November 17, 1998	Kitt Peak	Spacewatch	EOS	1.2 km	MPC · JPL
839897	2014 UY_{132}	—	August 31, 2014	Haleakala	Pan-STARRS 1	·	2.8 km	MPC · JPL
839898	2014 UX_{133}	—	November 27, 2009	Mount Lemmon	Mount Lemmon Survey	·	2.3 km	MPC · JPL
839899	2014 US_{138}	—	April 26, 2010	WISE	WISE	·	2.5 km	MPC · JPL
839900	2014 UZ_{138}	—	September 26, 2014	Mount Lemmon	Mount Lemmon Survey	·	810 m	MPC · JPL

== 839901–840000 ==
back to top

Designation			Discovery			Properties		Ref
Permanent	Provisional	Named after	Date	Site	Discoverer(s)	Category	Diam.	Ref
839901	2014 UB_{144}	—	October 3, 2008	La Sagra	OAM	T_{j} (2.99) · EUP	2.4 km	MPC · JPL
839902	2014 UY_{151}	—	May 1, 2006	Kitt Peak	Spacewatch	·	910 m	MPC · JPL
839903	2014 UU_{152}	—	April 5, 2010	WISE	WISE	·	2.9 km	MPC · JPL
839904	2014 UD_{155}	—	August 25, 2014	Haleakala	Pan-STARRS 1	·	2.3 km	MPC · JPL
839905	2014 UU_{156}	—	November 27, 2009	Kitt Peak	Spacewatch	·	4.0 km	MPC · JPL
839906	2014 UK_{160}	—	October 25, 2014	Haleakala	Pan-STARRS 1	·	2.0 km	MPC · JPL
839907	2014 UY_{160}	—	October 25, 2014	Haleakala	Pan-STARRS 1	·	2.5 km	MPC · JPL
839908	2014 UV_{163}	—	October 25, 2014	Haleakala	Pan-STARRS 1	·	650 m	MPC · JPL
839909	2014 UO_{165}	—	October 29, 2002	Sacramento Peak	SDSS	·	3.4 km	MPC · JPL
839910	2014 UL_{168}	—	October 26, 2014	Mount Lemmon	Mount Lemmon Survey	·	2.5 km	MPC · JPL
839911	2014 UG_{169}	—	November 29, 2009	Zelenchukskaya	T. V. Krjačko, B. Satovski	·	2.9 km	MPC · JPL
839912	2014 UO_{173}	—	October 28, 2014	Mount Lemmon	Mount Lemmon Survey	EUN	820 m	MPC · JPL
839913	2014 UP_{173}	—	January 16, 2010	Mount Lemmon	Mount Lemmon Survey	LIX	3.7 km	MPC · JPL
839914	2014 UF_{174}	—	October 1, 2000	Sacramento Peak	SDSS	·	2.5 km	MPC · JPL
839915	2014 UZ_{174}	—	October 1, 1997	Mauna Kea	C. Veillet, R. Shanks	·	2.2 km	MPC · JPL
839916	2014 UD_{175}	—	October 28, 2014	Haleakala	Pan-STARRS 1	·	2.1 km	MPC · JPL
839917	2014 UO_{175}	—	January 31, 2010	WISE	WISE	·	3.1 km	MPC · JPL
839918	2014 UN_{176}	—	September 2, 2014	Haleakala	Pan-STARRS 1	·	1.7 km	MPC · JPL
839919	2014 UO_{185}	—	October 2, 2014	Haleakala	Pan-STARRS 1	·	1.3 km	MPC · JPL
839920	2014 UE_{191}	—	October 3, 2014	Mount Lemmon	Mount Lemmon Survey	·	1.8 km	MPC · JPL
839921	2014 UX_{193}	—	October 2, 2014	Haleakala	Pan-STARRS 1	·	490 m	MPC · JPL
839922	2014 US_{195}	—	October 23, 2009	Mount Lemmon	Mount Lemmon Survey	·	1.2 km	MPC · JPL
839923	2014 UE_{197}	—	August 31, 2014	Haleakala	Pan-STARRS 1	NYS	930 m	MPC · JPL
839924	2014 UH_{208}	—	November 22, 2009	Catalina	CSS	·	1.6 km	MPC · JPL
839925	2014 UV_{211}	—	December 20, 2009	Catalina	CSS	·	2.4 km	MPC · JPL
839926	2014 UG_{213}	—	November 10, 2009	Kitt Peak	Spacewatch	·	2.6 km	MPC · JPL
839927	2014 UT_{215}	—	August 29, 2014	Mount Lemmon	Mount Lemmon Survey	·	1.2 km	MPC · JPL
839928	2014 UN_{218}	—	November 11, 2009	Mount Lemmon	Mount Lemmon Survey	TIR	2.6 km	MPC · JPL
839929	2014 UP_{218}	—	October 5, 2014	Mount Lemmon	Mount Lemmon Survey	·	2.3 km	MPC · JPL
839930	2014 UQ_{218}	—	September 17, 2014	Haleakala	Pan-STARRS 1	·	2.5 km	MPC · JPL
839931	2014 UV_{218}	—	February 14, 2010	WISE	WISE	·	2.0 km	MPC · JPL
839932	2014 UB_{219}	—	August 30, 2014	Mount Lemmon	Mount Lemmon Survey	THB	2.3 km	MPC · JPL
839933	2014 UM_{219}	—	January 6, 2010	Mount Lemmon	Mount Lemmon Survey	·	1.9 km	MPC · JPL
839934	2014 UR_{219}	—	February 26, 2010	WISE	WISE	·	2.1 km	MPC · JPL
839935	2014 UH_{222}	—	September 17, 2014	Haleakala	Pan-STARRS 1	TIR	2.1 km	MPC · JPL
839936	2014 UA_{223}	—	April 12, 2010	WISE	WISE	EUP	3.3 km	MPC · JPL
839937	2014 UC_{224}	—	December 18, 2009	Kitt Peak	Spacewatch	·	3.1 km	MPC · JPL
839938	2014 UR_{226}	—	March 17, 2010	WISE	WISE	·	2.6 km	MPC · JPL
839939	2014 UL_{230}	—	October 29, 2014	Haleakala	Pan-STARRS 1	·	840 m	MPC · JPL
839940	2014 UD_{231}	—	September 30, 2008	Catalina	CSS	·	2.4 km	MPC · JPL
839941	2014 UY_{233}	—	October 18, 2014	Mount Lemmon	Mount Lemmon Survey	·	2.3 km	MPC · JPL
839942	2014 UK_{237}	—	October 16, 2014	Kitt Peak	Spacewatch	·	1.2 km	MPC · JPL
839943	2014 UA_{239}	—	September 27, 2003	Kitt Peak	Spacewatch	·	2.2 km	MPC · JPL
839944	2014 UL_{242}	—	March 14, 2010	WISE	WISE	·	2.7 km	MPC · JPL
839945	2014 UT_{242}	—	October 27, 2014	Haleakala	Pan-STARRS 1	LIX	3.0 km	MPC · JPL
839946	2014 UG_{243}	—	March 28, 2010	WISE	WISE	EUP	2.9 km	MPC · JPL
839947	2014 UT_{243}	—	October 26, 2014	Mount Lemmon	Mount Lemmon Survey	·	2.2 km	MPC · JPL
839948	2014 UR_{244}	—	October 24, 2014	Mount Lemmon	Mount Lemmon Survey	·	670 m	MPC · JPL
839949	2014 UD_{246}	—	October 22, 2014	Mount Lemmon	Mount Lemmon Survey	·	1.7 km	MPC · JPL
839950	2014 UF_{246}	—	October 22, 2014	Mount Lemmon	Mount Lemmon Survey	·	1.5 km	MPC · JPL
839951	2014 UL_{247}	—	February 5, 2016	Haleakala	Pan-STARRS 1	EOS	1.3 km	MPC · JPL
839952	2014 UP_{247}	—	October 27, 2014	Haleakala	Pan-STARRS 1	·	1.6 km	MPC · JPL
839953	2014 UR_{248}	—	February 11, 2010	WISE	WISE	·	1.2 km	MPC · JPL
839954	2014 UN_{256}	—	September 30, 2014	Kitt Peak	Spacewatch	·	500 m	MPC · JPL
839955	2014 UU_{256}	—	October 29, 2014	Haleakala	Pan-STARRS 1	·	990 m	MPC · JPL
839956	2014 UL_{258}	—	October 25, 2014	Mount Lemmon	Mount Lemmon Survey	·	1.5 km	MPC · JPL
839957	2014 UD_{259}	—	October 22, 2014	Mount Lemmon	Mount Lemmon Survey	·	2.4 km	MPC · JPL
839958	2014 UV_{259}	—	October 28, 2014	Haleakala	Pan-STARRS 1	·	1.4 km	MPC · JPL
839959	2014 UC_{261}	—	October 28, 2014	Mount Lemmon	Mount Lemmon Survey	·	650 m	MPC · JPL
839960	2014 UP_{264}	—	October 27, 2014	Haleakala	Pan-STARRS 1	·	2.6 km	MPC · JPL
839961	2014 UY_{267}	—	October 17, 2014	Mount Lemmon	Mount Lemmon Survey	·	2.0 km	MPC · JPL
839962	2014 UM_{268}	—	October 22, 2014	Mount Lemmon	Mount Lemmon Survey	·	2.7 km	MPC · JPL
839963	2014 UG_{269}	—	October 16, 2014	Mount Lemmon	Mount Lemmon Survey	·	1.3 km	MPC · JPL
839964	2014 UL_{274}	—	October 26, 2014	Mount Lemmon	Mount Lemmon Survey	·	640 m	MPC · JPL
839965	2014 UP_{275}	—	October 30, 2014	Haleakala	Pan-STARRS 1	PHO	680 m	MPC · JPL
839966	2014 UH_{282}	—	October 29, 2014	Haleakala	Pan-STARRS 1	(2076)	540 m	MPC · JPL
839967	2014 UM_{283}	—	September 13, 2007	Mount Lemmon	Mount Lemmon Survey	·	440 m	MPC · JPL
839968	2014 UO_{283}	—	October 20, 2007	Mount Lemmon	Mount Lemmon Survey	·	480 m	MPC · JPL
839969	2014 UP_{286}	—	October 22, 2014	Catalina	CSS	T_{j} (2.93)	3.0 km	MPC · JPL
839970	2014 UG_{290}	—	October 21, 2014	Mount Lemmon	Mount Lemmon Survey	·	990 m	MPC · JPL
839971	2014 UO_{293}	—	May 29, 2024	Haleakala	Pan-STARRS 1	·	2.3 km	MPC · JPL
839972	2014 VT	—	November 6, 2014	Haleakala	Pan-STARRS 1	T_{j} (2.9)	2.2 km	MPC · JPL
839973	2014 VK_{6}	—	September 3, 2008	Kitt Peak	Spacewatch	·	2.6 km	MPC · JPL
839974	2014 VP_{8}	—	November 12, 2014	Haleakala	Pan-STARRS 1	·	1.5 km	MPC · JPL
839975	2014 VJ_{13}	—	September 9, 2008	Catalina	CSS	·	3.0 km	MPC · JPL
839976	2014 VT_{15}	—	March 1, 2010	WISE	WISE	·	1.2 km	MPC · JPL
839977	2014 VX_{16}	—	March 15, 2010	WISE	WISE	·	2.5 km	MPC · JPL
839978	2014 VO_{18}	—	August 27, 2014	Haleakala	Pan-STARRS 1	TIR	2.1 km	MPC · JPL
839979	2014 VV_{19}	—	September 7, 2008	Mount Lemmon	Mount Lemmon Survey	THM	1.7 km	MPC · JPL
839980	2014 VG_{20}	—	October 25, 2014	Kitt Peak	Spacewatch	·	830 m	MPC · JPL
839981	2014 VM_{22}	—	December 4, 2007	Mount Lemmon	Mount Lemmon Survey	·	660 m	MPC · JPL
839982	2014 VX_{31}	—	March 8, 2010	WISE	WISE	·	1.5 km	MPC · JPL
839983	2014 VX_{39}	—	November 10, 2014	Haleakala	Pan-STARRS 1	H	380 m	MPC · JPL
839984	2014 VD_{40}	—	February 11, 2010	WISE	WISE	·	1.7 km	MPC · JPL
839985	2014 VL_{40}	—	November 11, 2014	Haleakala	Pan-STARRS 1	·	2.3 km	MPC · JPL
839986	2014 WE_{2}	—	November 12, 2006	Mount Lemmon	Mount Lemmon Survey	·	800 m	MPC · JPL
839987	2014 WY_{2}	—	March 29, 2010	WISE	WISE	·	2.5 km	MPC · JPL
839988	2014 WD_{11}	—	November 1, 2014	Kitt Peak	Spacewatch	·	490 m	MPC · JPL
839989	2014 WO_{14}	—	February 18, 2010	WISE	WISE	·	2.9 km	MPC · JPL
839990	2014 WQ_{17}	—	April 7, 2010	WISE	WISE	·	3.4 km	MPC · JPL
839991	2014 WB_{20}	—	November 10, 2010	Kitt Peak	Spacewatch	·	790 m	MPC · JPL
839992	2014 WR_{22}	—	November 24, 2009	Kitt Peak	Spacewatch	·	1.5 km	MPC · JPL
839993	2014 WA_{28}	—	September 4, 2014	Haleakala	Pan-STARRS 1	TIN	810 m	MPC · JPL
839994	2014 WY_{31}	—	October 3, 2014	Mount Lemmon	Mount Lemmon Survey	·	960 m	MPC · JPL
839995	2014 WU_{32}	—	December 20, 2000	Kitt Peak	Deep Lens Survey	DOR	1.6 km	MPC · JPL
839996	2014 WL_{36}	—	April 6, 2010	WISE	WISE	·	2.4 km	MPC · JPL
839997	2014 WP_{36}	—	March 17, 2012	Mount Lemmon	Mount Lemmon Survey	NYS	910 m	MPC · JPL
839998	2014 WM_{37}	—	October 28, 2014	Mount Lemmon	Mount Lemmon Survey	H	430 m	MPC · JPL
839999	2014 WR_{37}	—	January 27, 2011	Kitt Peak	Spacewatch	·	1.3 km	MPC · JPL
840000	2014 WJ_{41}	—	October 18, 2014	Mount Lemmon	Mount Lemmon Survey	HNS	800 m	MPC · JPL

back to top
