= List of minor planets: 797001–798000 =

The following is a partial list of minor planets, running from minor-planet number 797001 through 798000, inclusive. The primary data for this and other partial lists is based on JPL's "Small-Body Orbital Elements" and data available from the Minor Planet Center. Critical list information is also provided by the MPC, unless otherwise specified from Lowell Observatory. A detailed description of the table's columns and additional sources are given on the main page including a complete list of every page in this series, and a statistical break-up on the dynamical classification of minor planets.

Also see the summary list of all named bodies in numerical and alphabetical order, and the corresponding naming citations for the number range of this particular list. New namings may only be added to this list after official publication, as the preannouncement of names is condemned by the Working Group for Small Bodies Nomenclature of the International Astronomical Union.

Near-Earth obj.	MBA (inner)	MBA (outer)	Centaur
Mars-crosser	MBA (middle)	Jupiter trojan	Trans-Neptunian obj.
Unclassified

== 797001–797100 ==
Designation			Discovery			Properties		Ref
Permanent	Provisional	Named after	Date	Site	Discoverer(s)	Category	Diam.	Ref
797001	2010 VP_{248}	—	November 11, 2010	Mount Lemmon	Mount Lemmon Survey	·	910 m	MPC · JPL
797002	2010 VO_{249}	—	November 8, 2010	Mount Lemmon	Mount Lemmon Survey	·	1.3 km	MPC · JPL
797003	2010 VS_{250}	—	November 1, 2010	Mount Lemmon	Mount Lemmon Survey	KOR	960 m	MPC · JPL
797004	2010 VR_{257}	—	May 21, 2014	Haleakala	Pan-STARRS 1	·	2.2 km	MPC · JPL
797005	2010 VT_{258}	—	November 3, 2010	Mount Lemmon	Mount Lemmon Survey	·	1.6 km	MPC · JPL
797006	2010 VA_{259}	—	November 3, 2010	Mount Lemmon	Mount Lemmon Survey	·	1 km	MPC · JPL
797007	2010 VM_{264}	—	November 2, 2010	Mount Lemmon	Mount Lemmon Survey	EOS	1.2 km	MPC · JPL
797008	2010 VD_{265}	—	November 12, 2010	Mount Lemmon	Mount Lemmon Survey	·	1.0 km	MPC · JPL
797009	2010 VM_{265}	—	November 12, 2010	Mount Lemmon	Mount Lemmon Survey	·	900 m	MPC · JPL
797010	2010 VL_{267}	—	November 2, 2010	Mount Lemmon	Mount Lemmon Survey	KOR	1.1 km	MPC · JPL
797011	2010 VW_{270}	—	November 2, 2010	Mount Lemmon	Mount Lemmon Survey	L4	6.3 km	MPC · JPL
797012	2010 VE_{271}	—	November 6, 2010	Mount Lemmon	Mount Lemmon Survey	VER	2.1 km	MPC · JPL
797013	2010 VF_{271}	—	November 2, 2010	Mount Lemmon	Mount Lemmon Survey	·	2.2 km	MPC · JPL
797014	2010 VW_{273}	—	November 8, 2010	Mount Lemmon	Mount Lemmon Survey	L4 · ERY	5.3 km	MPC · JPL
797015	2010 VM_{274}	—	November 13, 2010	Mount Lemmon	Mount Lemmon Survey	VER	2.1 km	MPC · JPL
797016	2010 VK_{276}	—	November 10, 2010	Mount Lemmon	Mount Lemmon Survey	·	1.7 km	MPC · JPL
797017	2010 VD_{277}	—	November 3, 2010	Kitt Peak	Spacewatch	·	2.3 km	MPC · JPL
797018	2010 VM_{277}	—	November 11, 2010	Mount Lemmon	Mount Lemmon Survey	·	1.0 km	MPC · JPL
797019	2010 VV_{277}	—	November 3, 2010	Kitt Peak	Spacewatch	·	670 m	MPC · JPL
797020	2010 VY_{278}	—	November 1, 2010	Mount Lemmon	Mount Lemmon Survey	·	2.1 km	MPC · JPL
797021	2010 VY_{280}	—	November 6, 2010	Mount Lemmon	Mount Lemmon Survey	·	880 m	MPC · JPL
797022	2010 VD_{281}	—	November 1, 2010	Mount Lemmon	Mount Lemmon Survey	·	970 m	MPC · JPL
797023	2010 VH_{283}	—	November 2, 2010	Mount Lemmon	Mount Lemmon Survey	·	1.1 km	MPC · JPL
797024	2010 VO_{283}	—	November 9, 2010	Mount Lemmon	Mount Lemmon Survey	·	1.2 km	MPC · JPL
797025	2010 VO_{284}	—	November 10, 2010	Mount Lemmon	Mount Lemmon Survey	·	1.1 km	MPC · JPL
797026	2010 VU_{284}	—	November 8, 2010	Mount Lemmon	Mount Lemmon Survey	·	1.0 km	MPC · JPL
797027	2010 WA_{2}	—	November 26, 2010	Mount Lemmon	Mount Lemmon Survey	·	1.0 km	MPC · JPL
797028	2010 WL_{5}	—	October 29, 2010	Kitt Peak	Spacewatch	·	1.0 km	MPC · JPL
797029	2010 WX_{10}	—	November 26, 2010	Mount Lemmon	Mount Lemmon Survey	·	2.0 km	MPC · JPL
797030	2010 WZ_{10}	—	November 26, 2010	Mount Lemmon	Mount Lemmon Survey	H	440 m	MPC · JPL
797031	2010 WN_{17}	—	October 29, 2010	Kitt Peak	Spacewatch	·	650 m	MPC · JPL
797032	2010 WS_{18}	—	January 7, 2006	Kitt Peak	Spacewatch	·	1.6 km	MPC · JPL
797033	2010 WD_{22}	—	October 14, 2010	Mount Lemmon	Mount Lemmon Survey	·	680 m	MPC · JPL
797034	2010 WM_{22}	—	November 27, 2010	Mount Lemmon	Mount Lemmon Survey	TIR	1.8 km	MPC · JPL
797035	2010 WC_{23}	—	November 27, 2010	Mount Lemmon	Mount Lemmon Survey	·	1.2 km	MPC · JPL
797036	2010 WV_{24}	—	November 27, 2010	Mount Lemmon	Mount Lemmon Survey	·	1.3 km	MPC · JPL
797037	2010 WE_{26}	—	March 1, 2008	Kitt Peak	Spacewatch	·	460 m	MPC · JPL
797038	2010 WY_{29}	—	November 27, 2010	Mount Lemmon	Mount Lemmon Survey	·	1.6 km	MPC · JPL
797039	2010 WJ_{30}	—	November 27, 2010	Mount Lemmon	Mount Lemmon Survey	·	1.1 km	MPC · JPL
797040	2010 WZ_{30}	—	November 13, 2010	Kitt Peak	Spacewatch	·	950 m	MPC · JPL
797041	2010 WY_{35}	—	November 27, 2010	Mount Lemmon	Mount Lemmon Survey	·	1.6 km	MPC · JPL
797042	2010 WA_{37}	—	November 27, 2010	Mount Lemmon	Mount Lemmon Survey	·	900 m	MPC · JPL
797043	2010 WB_{41}	—	November 27, 2010	Mount Lemmon	Mount Lemmon Survey	KON	2.0 km	MPC · JPL
797044	2010 WW_{43}	—	November 27, 2010	Mount Lemmon	Mount Lemmon Survey	EUN	650 m	MPC · JPL
797045	2010 WA_{53}	—	November 28, 2010	Mount Lemmon	Mount Lemmon Survey	·	1.2 km	MPC · JPL
797046	2010 WF_{58}	—	November 30, 2010	Mount Lemmon	Mount Lemmon Survey	·	1.3 km	MPC · JPL
797047	2010 WK_{64}	—	November 28, 2010	Kitt Peak	Spacewatch	EUN	1.1 km	MPC · JPL
797048	2010 WO_{77}	—	September 2, 2014	Haleakala	Pan-STARRS 1	·	1.1 km	MPC · JPL
797049	2010 WE_{78}	—	November 17, 2010	Kitt Peak	Spacewatch	(1547)	810 m	MPC · JPL
797050	2010 WK_{78}	—	November 28, 2010	Mount Lemmon	Mount Lemmon Survey	·	1.1 km	MPC · JPL
797051	2010 WA_{80}	—	November 25, 2010	Mount Lemmon	Mount Lemmon Survey	·	2.5 km	MPC · JPL
797052	2010 WF_{80}	—	November 26, 2010	Mount Lemmon	Mount Lemmon Survey	T_{j} (2.97)	2.7 km	MPC · JPL
797053	2010 XH_{6}	—	December 2, 2010	Mount Lemmon	Mount Lemmon Survey	·	890 m	MPC · JPL
797054	2010 XY_{6}	—	December 2, 2010	Mount Lemmon	Mount Lemmon Survey	·	2.5 km	MPC · JPL
797055	2010 XL_{7}	—	December 2, 2010	Mount Lemmon	Mount Lemmon Survey	EUN	710 m	MPC · JPL
797056	2010 XU_{12}	—	December 2, 2010	Mayhill-ISON	L. Elenin	·	2.0 km	MPC · JPL
797057	2010 XA_{19}	—	December 4, 2010	Mount Lemmon	Mount Lemmon Survey	JUN	680 m	MPC · JPL
797058	2010 XW_{19}	—	September 5, 2010	Mount Lemmon	Mount Lemmon Survey	·	1.4 km	MPC · JPL
797059	2010 XA_{23}	—	October 7, 2004	Kitt Peak	Spacewatch	THM	1.8 km	MPC · JPL
797060	2010 XC_{27}	—	December 1, 2010	Mount Lemmon	Mount Lemmon Survey	·	1.3 km	MPC · JPL
797061	2010 XH_{29}	—	November 27, 2010	Mount Lemmon	Mount Lemmon Survey	·	1.0 km	MPC · JPL
797062	2010 XZ_{31}	—	January 12, 2016	Haleakala	Pan-STARRS 1	EUN	830 m	MPC · JPL
797063	2010 XE_{32}	—	August 24, 2005	Palomar Mountain	NEAT	·	1.1 km	MPC · JPL
797064	2010 XU_{33}	—	December 2, 2010	Mount Lemmon	Mount Lemmon Survey	·	1.1 km	MPC · JPL
797065	2010 XN_{41}	—	December 5, 2010	Kitt Peak	Spacewatch	·	2.3 km	MPC · JPL
797066	2010 XW_{52}	—	December 6, 2010	Mount Lemmon	Mount Lemmon Survey	·	2.2 km	MPC · JPL
797067	2010 XC_{53}	—	November 11, 2010	Mount Lemmon	Mount Lemmon Survey	THB	1.6 km	MPC · JPL
797068	2010 XS_{58}	—	December 3, 2010	La Silla	M. E. Schwamb, D. L. Rabinowitz, S. Tourtellotte	centaur	70 km	MPC · JPL
797069	2010 XA_{61}	—	February 7, 2008	Kitt Peak	Spacewatch	·	550 m	MPC · JPL
797070	2010 XQ_{68}	—	December 11, 2010	Catalina	CSS	PHO	770 m	MPC · JPL
797071	2010 XM_{82}	—	December 3, 2010	Mount Lemmon	Mount Lemmon Survey	·	1.1 km	MPC · JPL
797072	2010 XO_{92}	—	December 3, 2010	Mount Lemmon	Mount Lemmon Survey	·	2.2 km	MPC · JPL
797073	2010 XA_{94}	—	December 10, 2010	Mount Lemmon	Mount Lemmon Survey	·	660 m	MPC · JPL
797074	2010 XF_{94}	—	December 1, 2010	Mount Lemmon	Mount Lemmon Survey	·	1.1 km	MPC · JPL
797075	2010 XP_{97}	—	December 7, 2010	Mount Lemmon	Mount Lemmon Survey	H	500 m	MPC · JPL
797076	2010 XH_{98}	—	December 2, 2010	Mount Lemmon	Mount Lemmon Survey	H	410 m	MPC · JPL
797077	2010 XB_{100}	—	April 16, 2012	Haleakala	Pan-STARRS 1	·	1.1 km	MPC · JPL
797078	2010 XC_{104}	—	November 16, 2014	Mount Lemmon	Mount Lemmon Survey	·	860 m	MPC · JPL
797079	2010 XL_{106}	—	January 14, 2018	Haleakala	Pan-STARRS 1	·	2.6 km	MPC · JPL
797080	2010 XW_{106}	—	December 10, 2010	Mount Lemmon	Mount Lemmon Survey	·	1.1 km	MPC · JPL
797081	2010 XW_{107}	—	December 3, 2010	Mount Lemmon	Mount Lemmon Survey	·	1.3 km	MPC · JPL
797082	2010 XD_{108}	—	June 8, 2018	Haleakala	Pan-STARRS 1	·	1.4 km	MPC · JPL
797083	2010 XV_{109}	—	December 14, 2010	Mount Lemmon	Mount Lemmon Survey	·	990 m	MPC · JPL
797084	2010 XB_{110}	—	December 8, 2010	Mount Lemmon	Mount Lemmon Survey	·	1.3 km	MPC · JPL
797085	2010 XR_{111}	—	December 8, 2010	Mayhill-ISON	L. Elenin	T_{j} (2.98) · EUP	3.1 km	MPC · JPL
797086	2010 XV_{112}	—	December 2, 2010	Mount Lemmon	Mount Lemmon Survey	·	2.1 km	MPC · JPL
797087	2010 XP_{113}	—	December 6, 2010	Mount Lemmon	Mount Lemmon Survey	·	1.3 km	MPC · JPL
797088	2010 XV_{114}	—	December 4, 2010	Mount Lemmon	Mount Lemmon Survey	L4	5.4 km	MPC · JPL
797089	2010 XJ_{116}	—	December 3, 2010	Mount Lemmon	Mount Lemmon Survey	·	1.2 km	MPC · JPL
797090	2010 XQ_{118}	—	December 6, 2010	Mount Lemmon	Mount Lemmon Survey	·	2.3 km	MPC · JPL
797091	2010 XV_{119}	—	December 3, 2010	Mount Lemmon	Mount Lemmon Survey	L4	5.1 km	MPC · JPL
797092	2010 XS_{121}	—	December 2, 2010	Mount Lemmon	Mount Lemmon Survey	·	2.2 km	MPC · JPL
797093	2010 XH_{122}	—	December 8, 2010	Mount Lemmon	Mount Lemmon Survey	·	880 m	MPC · JPL
797094	2010 XK_{122}	—	December 13, 2010	Mount Lemmon	Mount Lemmon Survey	·	2.1 km	MPC · JPL
797095	2010 XQ_{123}	—	December 6, 2010	Mount Lemmon	Mount Lemmon Survey	AEO	780 m	MPC · JPL
797096	2010 XN_{124}	—	December 5, 2010	Mount Lemmon	Mount Lemmon Survey	·	1.6 km	MPC · JPL
797097	2010 YY_{2}	—	December 30, 2010	Piszkés-tető	K. Sárneczky, Z. Kuli	·	1.1 km	MPC · JPL
797098	2010 YH_{4}	—	December 8, 2010	Kitt Peak	Spacewatch	·	1.0 km	MPC · JPL
797099	2010 YK_{6}	—	October 22, 2014	Mount Lemmon	Mount Lemmon Survey	EUN	870 m	MPC · JPL
797100	2010 YT_{6}	—	December 25, 2010	Mount Lemmon	Mount Lemmon Survey	·	2.9 km	MPC · JPL

== 797101–797200 ==
back to top

Designation			Discovery			Properties		Ref
Permanent	Provisional	Named after	Date	Site	Discoverer(s)	Category	Diam.	Ref
797101	2010 YY_{6}	—	December 25, 2010	Mount Lemmon	Mount Lemmon Survey	EUN	790 m	MPC · JPL
797102	2011 AX_{2}	—	January 3, 2011	Mount Lemmon	Mount Lemmon Survey	DOR	1.6 km	MPC · JPL
797103	2011 AJ_{6}	—	January 4, 2011	Mount Lemmon	Mount Lemmon Survey	·	1.0 km	MPC · JPL
797104	2011 AF_{16}	—	December 17, 2003	Socorro	LINEAR	·	370 m	MPC · JPL
797105	2011 AB_{20}	—	January 23, 2006	Kitt Peak	Spacewatch	·	2.1 km	MPC · JPL
797106	2011 AE_{20}	—	January 8, 2011	Mount Lemmon	Mount Lemmon Survey	H	490 m	MPC · JPL
797107	2011 AC_{25}	—	December 12, 2010	Mayhill-ISON	L. Elenin	H	430 m	MPC · JPL
797108	2011 AG_{26}	—	January 8, 2011	Kitt Peak	Spacewatch	·	1.8 km	MPC · JPL
797109	2011 AM_{27}	—	August 16, 2001	Palomar Mountain	NEAT	H	440 m	MPC · JPL
797110	2011 AP_{29}	—	January 8, 2011	Mount Lemmon	Mount Lemmon Survey	·	2.8 km	MPC · JPL
797111	2011 AY_{32}	—	January 10, 2011	Mount Lemmon	Mount Lemmon Survey	·	980 m	MPC · JPL
797112	2011 AL_{34}	—	January 10, 2011	Zelenchukskaya	T. V. Krjačko, B. Satovski	·	1.4 km	MPC · JPL
797113	2011 AH_{40}	—	December 1, 2010	Mount Lemmon	Mount Lemmon Survey	·	1.5 km	MPC · JPL
797114	2011 AC_{44}	—	January 10, 2011	Kitt Peak	Spacewatch	·	840 m	MPC · JPL
797115	2011 AB_{45}	—	January 10, 2011	Kitt Peak	Spacewatch	·	1.1 km	MPC · JPL
797116	2011 AT_{46}	—	January 10, 2011	Kitt Peak	Spacewatch	·	1.4 km	MPC · JPL
797117	2011 AU_{53}	—	December 3, 2010	Mount Lemmon	Mount Lemmon Survey	PHO	710 m	MPC · JPL
797118	2011 AK_{55}	—	December 14, 2010	Mount Lemmon	Mount Lemmon Survey	·	1.2 km	MPC · JPL
797119	2011 AR_{59}	—	January 12, 2011	Mount Lemmon	Mount Lemmon Survey	·	600 m	MPC · JPL
797120	2011 AJ_{64}	—	January 14, 2011	Mount Lemmon	Mount Lemmon Survey	·	1.4 km	MPC · JPL
797121	2011 AQ_{71}	—	January 14, 2011	Mount Lemmon	Mount Lemmon Survey	·	1.1 km	MPC · JPL
797122	2011 AC_{77}	—	January 10, 2011	Mount Lemmon	Mount Lemmon Survey	·	1.4 km	MPC · JPL
797123	2011 AS_{82}	—	January 12, 2011	Mount Lemmon	Mount Lemmon Survey	critical	1.2 km	MPC · JPL
797124	2011 AC_{83}	—	January 14, 2011	Mount Lemmon	Mount Lemmon Survey	·	2.2 km	MPC · JPL
797125	2011 AT_{86}	—	January 8, 2011	Mount Lemmon	Mount Lemmon Survey	·	1.7 km	MPC · JPL
797126	2011 AO_{87}	—	January 8, 2011	Kitt Peak	Spacewatch	AEO	740 m	MPC · JPL
797127	2011 AB_{88}	—	January 10, 2011	Mount Lemmon	Mount Lemmon Survey	·	1.3 km	MPC · JPL
797128	2011 AC_{88}	—	January 14, 2011	Kitt Peak	Spacewatch	·	1.2 km	MPC · JPL
797129	2011 AN_{88}	—	January 10, 2011	Mount Lemmon	Mount Lemmon Survey	ADE	1.4 km	MPC · JPL
797130	2011 AC_{90}	—	November 17, 2014	Haleakala	Pan-STARRS 1	·	1.1 km	MPC · JPL
797131	2011 AJ_{93}	—	January 12, 2011	Mount Lemmon	Mount Lemmon Survey	·	1.2 km	MPC · JPL
797132	2011 AQ_{93}	—	January 14, 2011	Mount Lemmon	Mount Lemmon Survey	·	830 m	MPC · JPL
797133	2011 AR_{93}	—	January 4, 2011	Mount Lemmon	Mount Lemmon Survey	EUN	680 m	MPC · JPL
797134	2011 AU_{93}	—	January 13, 2011	Mount Lemmon	Mount Lemmon Survey	·	940 m	MPC · JPL
797135	2011 AZ_{95}	—	January 11, 2011	Kitt Peak	Spacewatch	·	1.6 km	MPC · JPL
797136	2011 AK_{96}	—	January 8, 2011	Mount Lemmon	Mount Lemmon Survey	·	1.2 km	MPC · JPL
797137	2011 AE_{97}	—	January 12, 2011	Mount Lemmon	Mount Lemmon Survey	MRX	610 m	MPC · JPL
797138	2011 AT_{99}	—	January 5, 2011	Mount Lemmon	Mount Lemmon Survey	L4	6.2 km	MPC · JPL
797139	2011 AZ_{100}	—	January 13, 2011	Mount Lemmon	Mount Lemmon Survey	·	1.2 km	MPC · JPL
797140	2011 AN_{101}	—	January 3, 2011	Mount Lemmon	Mount Lemmon Survey	·	2.0 km	MPC · JPL
797141	2011 AW_{101}	—	January 14, 2011	Mount Lemmon	Mount Lemmon Survey	·	1.3 km	MPC · JPL
797142	2011 AE_{102}	—	January 12, 2011	Mount Lemmon	Mount Lemmon Survey	·	970 m	MPC · JPL
797143	2011 AG_{102}	—	January 2, 2011	Mount Lemmon	Mount Lemmon Survey	·	1.2 km	MPC · JPL
797144	2011 AO_{102}	—	January 13, 2011	Mount Lemmon	Mount Lemmon Survey	·	1.4 km	MPC · JPL
797145	2011 AT_{104}	—	January 14, 2011	Kitt Peak	Spacewatch	·	1.2 km	MPC · JPL
797146	2011 AW_{104}	—	December 15, 2006	Mount Lemmon	Mount Lemmon Survey	·	890 m	MPC · JPL
797147	2011 AE_{105}	—	January 9, 2011	Westfield	International Astronomical Search Collaboration	·	1.1 km	MPC · JPL
797148	2011 AN_{107}	—	January 14, 2011	Mount Lemmon	Mount Lemmon Survey	·	1.1 km	MPC · JPL
797149	2011 AX_{108}	—	January 2, 2011	Mount Lemmon	Mount Lemmon Survey	L4	5.0 km	MPC · JPL
797150	2011 AZ_{109}	—	January 14, 2011	Mount Lemmon	Mount Lemmon Survey	KOR	950 m	MPC · JPL
797151	2011 AH_{112}	—	January 14, 2011	Mount Lemmon	Mount Lemmon Survey	·	1.2 km	MPC · JPL
797152	2011 BP	—	January 3, 2011	Mount Lemmon	Mount Lemmon Survey	VER	2.1 km	MPC · JPL
797153	2011 BB_{8}	—	December 13, 2010	Mount Lemmon	Mount Lemmon Survey	V	440 m	MPC · JPL
797154	2011 BU_{21}	—	December 5, 2010	Mount Lemmon	Mount Lemmon Survey	·	1.5 km	MPC · JPL
797155	2011 BM_{24}	—	January 28, 2011	Haleakala	Pan-STARRS 1	AMO +1km	790 m	MPC · JPL
797156	2011 BE_{25}	—	January 24, 2011	Catalina	CSS	·	650 m	MPC · JPL
797157	2011 BU_{25}	—	January 23, 2011	Mount Lemmon	Mount Lemmon Survey	·	1.1 km	MPC · JPL
797158	2011 BV_{28}	—	January 26, 2011	Mount Lemmon	Mount Lemmon Survey	·	1.1 km	MPC · JPL
797159	2011 BE_{31}	—	January 26, 2011	Mount Lemmon	Mount Lemmon Survey	·	1.1 km	MPC · JPL
797160	2011 BD_{44}	—	January 30, 2011	Piszkés-tető	K. Sárneczky, Z. Kuli	·	1.1 km	MPC · JPL
797161	2011 BW_{57}	—	January 30, 2011	Mount Lemmon	Mount Lemmon Survey	·	1.1 km	MPC · JPL
797162	2011 BQ_{58}	—	January 30, 2011	Mount Lemmon	Mount Lemmon Survey	·	2.4 km	MPC · JPL
797163	2011 BC_{64}	—	December 8, 2010	Mount Lemmon	Mount Lemmon Survey	·	1.6 km	MPC · JPL
797164	2011 BN_{74}	—	February 5, 2011	Haleakala	Pan-STARRS 1	·	2.2 km	MPC · JPL
797165	2011 BR_{74}	—	February 5, 2011	Haleakala	Pan-STARRS 1	·	1.2 km	MPC · JPL
797166	2011 BD_{89}	—	February 7, 2002	Kitt Peak	Spacewatch	·	1.2 km	MPC · JPL
797167	2011 BS_{97}	—	January 29, 2011	Mount Lemmon	Mount Lemmon Survey	·	1.2 km	MPC · JPL
797168	2011 BC_{108}	—	February 10, 2011	Mount Lemmon	Mount Lemmon Survey	MRX	560 m	MPC · JPL
797169	2011 BY_{110}	—	January 16, 2005	Mauna Kea	Veillet, C.	VER	1.7 km	MPC · JPL
797170	2011 BA_{111}	—	February 5, 2011	Haleakala	Pan-STARRS 1	·	1.2 km	MPC · JPL
797171	2011 BM_{113}	—	February 5, 2011	Haleakala	Pan-STARRS 1	·	1.4 km	MPC · JPL
797172	2011 BC_{114}	—	February 26, 2011	Mount Lemmon	Mount Lemmon Survey	·	1.2 km	MPC · JPL
797173	2011 BP_{116}	—	January 24, 2011	Mount Lemmon	Mount Lemmon Survey	·	1.3 km	MPC · JPL
797174	2011 BA_{120}	—	October 28, 2005	Mount Lemmon	Mount Lemmon Survey	·	1.1 km	MPC · JPL
797175	2011 BJ_{120}	—	March 14, 2007	Kitt Peak	Spacewatch	·	1.3 km	MPC · JPL
797176	2011 BN_{123}	—	February 10, 2011	Mount Lemmon	Mount Lemmon Survey	·	1.2 km	MPC · JPL
797177	2011 BO_{125}	—	January 27, 2011	Mount Lemmon	Mount Lemmon Survey	THM	1.6 km	MPC · JPL
797178	2011 BR_{125}	—	January 27, 2011	Mount Lemmon	Mount Lemmon Survey	·	1.0 km	MPC · JPL
797179	2011 BR_{127}	—	January 28, 2011	Mount Lemmon	Mount Lemmon Survey	ADE	1.5 km	MPC · JPL
797180	2011 BY_{130}	—	January 28, 2011	Mount Lemmon	Mount Lemmon Survey	·	1.1 km	MPC · JPL
797181	2011 BZ_{131}	—	January 28, 2011	Mount Lemmon	Mount Lemmon Survey	·	1.2 km	MPC · JPL
797182	2011 BT_{132}	—	January 28, 2011	Mount Lemmon	Mount Lemmon Survey	·	1.1 km	MPC · JPL
797183	2011 BC_{133}	—	January 29, 2011	Kitt Peak	Spacewatch	·	1.3 km	MPC · JPL
797184	2011 BY_{136}	—	January 29, 2011	Mount Lemmon	Mount Lemmon Survey	(12739)	1.1 km	MPC · JPL
797185	2011 BX_{141}	—	January 8, 2011	Mount Lemmon	Mount Lemmon Survey	·	1.3 km	MPC · JPL
797186	2011 BJ_{146}	—	January 29, 2011	Mount Lemmon	Mount Lemmon Survey	·	1.1 km	MPC · JPL
797187	2011 BA_{150}	—	January 29, 2011	Mount Lemmon	Mount Lemmon Survey	·	1.2 km	MPC · JPL
797188	2011 BG_{152}	—	December 8, 2010	Mount Lemmon	Mount Lemmon Survey	·	1.2 km	MPC · JPL
797189	2011 BJ_{154}	—	January 27, 2011	Mount Lemmon	Mount Lemmon Survey	·	1.0 km	MPC · JPL
797190	2011 BN_{156}	—	November 4, 2005	Mount Lemmon	Mount Lemmon Survey	·	1.1 km	MPC · JPL
797191	2011 BM_{157}	—	January 29, 2011	Mount Lemmon	Mount Lemmon Survey	·	1.1 km	MPC · JPL
797192	2011 BV_{159}	—	March 16, 2007	Mount Lemmon	Mount Lemmon Survey	·	1.2 km	MPC · JPL
797193	2011 BF_{160}	—	January 29, 2011	Mount Lemmon	Mount Lemmon Survey	·	1.3 km	MPC · JPL
797194	2011 BN_{160}	—	January 10, 2011	Mount Lemmon	Mount Lemmon Survey	(13314)	1.2 km	MPC · JPL
797195	2011 BE_{168}	—	February 26, 2011	Mount Lemmon	Mount Lemmon Survey	AGN	820 m	MPC · JPL
797196	2011 BD_{175}	—	April 19, 2017	Mount Lemmon	Mount Lemmon Survey	H	420 m	MPC · JPL
797197	2011 BJ_{176}	—	March 16, 2012	Haleakala	Pan-STARRS 1	·	1.3 km	MPC · JPL
797198	2011 BP_{176}	—	August 3, 2016	Haleakala	Pan-STARRS 1	·	590 m	MPC · JPL
797199	2011 BU_{176}	—	January 28, 2011	Mount Lemmon	Mount Lemmon Survey	·	570 m	MPC · JPL
797200	2011 BC_{177}	—	March 31, 2012	Kitt Peak	Spacewatch	·	1.9 km	MPC · JPL

== 797201–797300 ==
back to top

Designation			Discovery			Properties		Ref
Permanent	Provisional	Named after	Date	Site	Discoverer(s)	Category	Diam.	Ref
797201	2011 BP_{177}	—	February 7, 2011	Mount Lemmon	Mount Lemmon Survey	·	1.6 km	MPC · JPL
797202	2011 BT_{177}	—	January 30, 2011	Haleakala	Pan-STARRS 1	AGN	730 m	MPC · JPL
797203	2011 BD_{178}	—	January 30, 2011	Mount Lemmon	Mount Lemmon Survey	·	610 m	MPC · JPL
797204	2011 BU_{179}	—	January 27, 2011	Mount Lemmon	Mount Lemmon Survey	·	1.6 km	MPC · JPL
797205	2011 BX_{179}	—	January 30, 2011	Mount Lemmon	Mount Lemmon Survey	·	1.2 km	MPC · JPL
797206	2011 BS_{180}	—	September 17, 1995	Kitt Peak	Spacewatch	·	750 m	MPC · JPL
797207	2011 BB_{182}	—	February 7, 2011	Mount Lemmon	Mount Lemmon Survey	·	660 m	MPC · JPL
797208	2011 BZ_{182}	—	June 20, 2013	Haleakala	Pan-STARRS 1	LUT	3.0 km	MPC · JPL
797209	2011 BU_{183}	—	September 12, 2016	Mount Lemmon	Mount Lemmon Survey	V	490 m	MPC · JPL
797210	2011 BC_{186}	—	November 17, 2014	Mount Lemmon	Mount Lemmon Survey	·	1.4 km	MPC · JPL
797211	2011 BX_{189}	—	September 2, 2014	Haleakala	Pan-STARRS 1	EOS	1.3 km	MPC · JPL
797212	2011 BJ_{190}	—	March 4, 2016	Haleakala	Pan-STARRS 1	·	1.4 km	MPC · JPL
797213	2011 BC_{191}	—	January 26, 2011	Mount Lemmon	Mount Lemmon Survey	·	1.2 km	MPC · JPL
797214	2011 BH_{191}	—	August 27, 2014	Haleakala	Pan-STARRS 1	VER	2.1 km	MPC · JPL
797215	2011 BF_{192}	—	October 28, 2014	Haleakala	Pan-STARRS 1	·	960 m	MPC · JPL
797216	2011 BL_{193}	—	January 29, 2011	Mount Lemmon	Mount Lemmon Survey	·	1.1 km	MPC · JPL
797217	2011 BM_{194}	—	January 23, 2011	Mount Lemmon	Mount Lemmon Survey	EOS	1.4 km	MPC · JPL
797218	2011 BT_{194}	—	January 29, 2011	Mount Lemmon	Mount Lemmon Survey	EOS	1.2 km	MPC · JPL
797219	2011 BH_{195}	—	January 27, 2011	Mount Lemmon	Mount Lemmon Survey	·	1.2 km	MPC · JPL
797220	2011 BK_{195}	—	January 30, 2011	Mount Lemmon	Mount Lemmon Survey	WIT	600 m	MPC · JPL
797221	2011 BY_{196}	—	January 29, 2011	Mount Lemmon	Mount Lemmon Survey	KOR	850 m	MPC · JPL
797222	2011 BV_{197}	—	January 30, 2011	Haleakala	Pan-STARRS 1	·	1.4 km	MPC · JPL
797223	2011 BL_{198}	—	January 26, 2011	Catalina	CSS	·	1.2 km	MPC · JPL
797224	2011 BS_{201}	—	January 23, 2011	Mount Lemmon	Mount Lemmon Survey	·	1.1 km	MPC · JPL
797225	2011 BA_{203}	—	January 25, 2011	Kitt Peak	Spacewatch	·	610 m	MPC · JPL
797226	2011 BM_{203}	—	January 28, 2011	Mount Lemmon	Mount Lemmon Survey	·	2.3 km	MPC · JPL
797227	2011 BK_{204}	—	January 23, 2011	Mount Lemmon	Mount Lemmon Survey	·	1.1 km	MPC · JPL
797228	2011 BO_{205}	—	January 30, 2011	Mount Lemmon	Mount Lemmon Survey	EOS	1.3 km	MPC · JPL
797229	2011 BR_{205}	—	January 29, 2011	Mount Lemmon	Mount Lemmon Survey	·	1.6 km	MPC · JPL
797230	2011 BU_{205}	—	January 29, 2011	Mount Lemmon	Mount Lemmon Survey	EOS	1.4 km	MPC · JPL
797231	2011 BG_{206}	—	January 29, 2011	Mount Lemmon	Mount Lemmon Survey	EOS	1.3 km	MPC · JPL
797232	2011 BJ_{208}	—	January 29, 2011	Mount Lemmon	Mount Lemmon Survey	·	910 m	MPC · JPL
797233	2011 BO_{208}	—	January 30, 2011	Mount Lemmon	Mount Lemmon Survey	·	1.2 km	MPC · JPL
797234	2011 BR_{208}	—	January 26, 2011	Kitt Peak	Spacewatch	·	910 m	MPC · JPL
797235	2011 BM_{210}	—	January 22, 2015	Haleakala	Pan-STARRS 1	·	1.1 km	MPC · JPL
797236	2011 BX_{210}	—	January 29, 2011	Mount Lemmon	Mount Lemmon Survey	·	1.1 km	MPC · JPL
797237	2011 BY_{211}	—	January 23, 2011	Mount Lemmon	Mount Lemmon Survey	(260)	2.7 km	MPC · JPL
797238	2011 CO_{7}	—	February 5, 2011	Mount Lemmon	Mount Lemmon Survey	·	1.2 km	MPC · JPL
797239	2011 CT_{7}	—	February 6, 2011	Kitt Peak	Spacewatch	·	1.2 km	MPC · JPL
797240	2011 CZ_{12}	—	February 5, 2011	Mount Lemmon	Mount Lemmon Survey	·	1.1 km	MPC · JPL
797241	2011 CF_{16}	—	February 4, 2011	Catalina	CSS	·	1.4 km	MPC · JPL
797242	2011 CJ_{24}	—	February 1, 2011	Piszkés-tető	K. Sárneczky, Z. Kuli	·	1.9 km	MPC · JPL
797243	2011 CD_{27}	—	December 8, 2010	Mount Lemmon	Mount Lemmon Survey	·	660 m	MPC · JPL
797244	2011 CG_{28}	—	January 28, 2011	Mount Lemmon	Mount Lemmon Survey	·	550 m	MPC · JPL
797245	2011 CX_{28}	—	February 5, 2011	Mount Lemmon	Mount Lemmon Survey	·	1.2 km	MPC · JPL
797246	2011 CJ_{31}	—	January 16, 2011	Mount Lemmon	Mount Lemmon Survey	·	1.2 km	MPC · JPL
797247	2011 CS_{32}	—	February 1, 2017	Mount Lemmon	Mount Lemmon Survey	·	2.2 km	MPC · JPL
797248	2011 CV_{38}	—	February 5, 2011	Mount Lemmon	Mount Lemmon Survey	·	1.2 km	MPC · JPL
797249	2011 CX_{40}	—	February 8, 2011	Mount Lemmon	Mount Lemmon Survey	AEO	590 m	MPC · JPL
797250	2011 CD_{41}	—	February 8, 2011	Mount Lemmon	Mount Lemmon Survey	·	1 km	MPC · JPL
797251	2011 CJ_{49}	—	February 7, 2011	Kitt Peak	Spacewatch	·	1.1 km	MPC · JPL
797252	2011 CN_{55}	—	January 27, 2011	Mount Lemmon	Mount Lemmon Survey	MRX	640 m	MPC · JPL
797253	2011 CO_{56}	—	February 8, 2011	Mount Lemmon	Mount Lemmon Survey	EOS	1.3 km	MPC · JPL
797254	2011 CR_{59}	—	February 8, 2011	Mount Lemmon	Mount Lemmon Survey	·	560 m	MPC · JPL
797255	2011 CB_{64}	—	February 10, 2011	Mount Lemmon	Mount Lemmon Survey	·	780 m	MPC · JPL
797256	2011 CS_{65}	—	February 5, 2011	Catalina	CSS	H	470 m	MPC · JPL
797257	2011 CA_{69}	—	January 30, 2011	Mount Lemmon	Mount Lemmon Survey	EOS	1.4 km	MPC · JPL
797258	2011 CA_{73}	—	February 5, 2011	Catalina	CSS	·	1.4 km	MPC · JPL
797259	2011 CK_{77}	—	February 3, 2011	Piszkés-tető	K. Sárneczky, Z. Kuli	·	1.3 km	MPC · JPL
797260	2011 CL_{86}	—	March 15, 2002	Palomar Mountain	NEAT	·	1.3 km	MPC · JPL
797261	2011 CC_{89}	—	February 5, 2011	Haleakala	Pan-STARRS 1	·	540 m	MPC · JPL
797262	2011 CJ_{89}	—	February 1, 2011	Kitt Peak	Spacewatch	·	1.4 km	MPC · JPL
797263	2011 CA_{98}	—	February 5, 2011	Haleakala	Pan-STARRS 1	·	2.3 km	MPC · JPL
797264	2011 CW_{98}	—	November 10, 2009	Kitt Peak	Spacewatch	·	2.2 km	MPC · JPL
797265	2011 CN_{99}	—	February 5, 2011	Haleakala	Pan-STARRS 1	DOR	1.5 km	MPC · JPL
797266	2011 CL_{102}	—	February 5, 2011	Haleakala	Pan-STARRS 1	·	1.1 km	MPC · JPL
797267	2011 CR_{102}	—	February 5, 2011	Haleakala	Pan-STARRS 1	AGN	750 m	MPC · JPL
797268	2011 CV_{102}	—	March 6, 2011	Mount Lemmon	Mount Lemmon Survey	·	1.9 km	MPC · JPL
797269	2011 CC_{108}	—	February 5, 2011	Haleakala	Pan-STARRS 1	·	2.2 km	MPC · JPL
797270	2011 CW_{118}	—	February 10, 2011	Mount Lemmon	Mount Lemmon Survey	·	1.3 km	MPC · JPL
797271	2011 CA_{121}	—	February 7, 2011	Mount Lemmon	Mount Lemmon Survey	DOR	1.6 km	MPC · JPL
797272	2011 CT_{121}	—	January 30, 2011	Mount Lemmon	Mount Lemmon Survey	·	980 m	MPC · JPL
797273	2011 CL_{122}	—	February 26, 2011	Mount Lemmon	Mount Lemmon Survey	·	950 m	MPC · JPL
797274	2011 CU_{123}	—	February 13, 2011	Mount Lemmon	Mount Lemmon Survey	·	1.2 km	MPC · JPL
797275	2011 CA_{124}	—	February 26, 2011	Mount Lemmon	Mount Lemmon Survey	·	1.3 km	MPC · JPL
797276	2011 CZ_{124}	—	February 22, 2017	Mount Lemmon	Mount Lemmon Survey	·	2.4 km	MPC · JPL
797277	2011 CN_{125}	—	February 5, 2011	Mount Lemmon	Mount Lemmon Survey	·	1.5 km	MPC · JPL
797278	2011 CS_{126}	—	February 5, 2011	Haleakala	Pan-STARRS 1	·	2.1 km	MPC · JPL
797279	2011 CC_{129}	—	February 7, 2011	Mount Lemmon	Mount Lemmon Survey	·	1.4 km	MPC · JPL
797280	2011 CP_{129}	—	February 8, 2011	Mount Lemmon	Mount Lemmon Survey	·	920 m	MPC · JPL
797281	2011 CU_{129}	—	February 13, 2011	Mount Lemmon	Mount Lemmon Survey	·	1.2 km	MPC · JPL
797282	2011 CP_{134}	—	February 9, 2011	Mount Lemmon	Mount Lemmon Survey	·	1.2 km	MPC · JPL
797283	2011 CU_{134}	—	February 5, 2011	Mount Lemmon	Mount Lemmon Survey	·	1.2 km	MPC · JPL
797284	2011 CV_{134}	—	February 13, 2011	Mount Lemmon	Mount Lemmon Survey	·	1.1 km	MPC · JPL
797285	2011 CV_{135}	—	February 5, 2011	Haleakala	Pan-STARRS 1	·	1.7 km	MPC · JPL
797286	2011 CG_{136}	—	February 10, 2011	Mount Lemmon	Mount Lemmon Survey	·	1.1 km	MPC · JPL
797287	2011 CL_{137}	—	February 11, 2011	Mount Lemmon	Mount Lemmon Survey	·	1.2 km	MPC · JPL
797288	2011 CG_{138}	—	February 7, 2011	Mount Lemmon	Mount Lemmon Survey	AGN	820 m	MPC · JPL
797289	2011 CD_{139}	—	February 8, 2011	Mount Lemmon	Mount Lemmon Survey	·	390 m	MPC · JPL
797290	2011 CP_{140}	—	February 7, 2011	Mount Lemmon	Mount Lemmon Survey	·	1.8 km	MPC · JPL
797291	2011 CL_{143}	—	February 8, 2011	Mount Lemmon	Mount Lemmon Survey	·	2.0 km	MPC · JPL
797292	2011 CO_{144}	—	February 10, 2011	Mount Lemmon	Mount Lemmon Survey	·	1.1 km	MPC · JPL
797293	2011 CQ_{144}	—	February 7, 2011	Mount Lemmon	Mount Lemmon Survey	·	1.8 km	MPC · JPL
797294	2011 CE_{146}	—	April 4, 2016	Haleakala	Pan-STARRS 1	·	1.5 km	MPC · JPL
797295	2011 CP_{146}	—	February 8, 2011	Mount Lemmon	Mount Lemmon Survey	·	1.3 km	MPC · JPL
797296	2011 CR_{147}	—	February 11, 2011	Mount Lemmon	Mount Lemmon Survey	·	1.4 km	MPC · JPL
797297	2011 CU_{147}	—	February 10, 2011	Mount Lemmon	Mount Lemmon Survey	EOS	1.3 km	MPC · JPL
797298	2011 CW_{147}	—	February 7, 2011	Mount Lemmon	Mount Lemmon Survey	·	1.2 km	MPC · JPL
797299	2011 CZ_{148}	—	February 5, 2011	Haleakala	Pan-STARRS 1	·	1.3 km	MPC · JPL
797300	2011 CG_{149}	—	February 5, 2011	Haleakala	Pan-STARRS 1	·	1.3 km	MPC · JPL

== 797301–797400 ==
back to top

Designation			Discovery			Properties		Ref
Permanent	Provisional	Named after	Date	Site	Discoverer(s)	Category	Diam.	Ref
797301	2011 CJ_{149}	—	February 8, 2011	Mount Lemmon	Mount Lemmon Survey	·	960 m	MPC · JPL
797302	2011 CN_{149}	—	February 7, 2011	Mount Lemmon	Mount Lemmon Survey	·	1.1 km	MPC · JPL
797303	2011 CO_{149}	—	February 7, 2011	Mount Lemmon	Mount Lemmon Survey	·	1.0 km	MPC · JPL
797304	2011 CM_{150}	—	February 7, 2011	Mount Lemmon	Mount Lemmon Survey	AST	1.2 km	MPC · JPL
797305	2011 CR_{150}	—	February 7, 2011	Mount Lemmon	Mount Lemmon Survey	·	1.2 km	MPC · JPL
797306	2011 CH_{151}	—	February 5, 2011	Haleakala	Pan-STARRS 1	·	2.1 km	MPC · JPL
797307	2011 CK_{151}	—	February 7, 2011	Mount Lemmon	Mount Lemmon Survey	·	1.8 km	MPC · JPL
797308	2011 CY_{151}	—	February 5, 2011	Haleakala	Pan-STARRS 1	KOR	970 m	MPC · JPL
797309	2011 CD_{152}	—	February 7, 2011	Mount Lemmon	Mount Lemmon Survey	KOR	870 m	MPC · JPL
797310	2011 CZ_{153}	—	February 11, 2011	Mount Lemmon	Mount Lemmon Survey	·	820 m	MPC · JPL
797311	2011 CW_{154}	—	February 8, 2011	Mount Lemmon	Mount Lemmon Survey	·	1.2 km	MPC · JPL
797312	2011 CC_{156}	—	February 10, 2011	Mount Lemmon	Mount Lemmon Survey	·	1.4 km	MPC · JPL
797313	2011 DH	—	February 22, 2011	Kitt Peak	Spacewatch	·	1.3 km	MPC · JPL
797314	2011 DL_{1}	—	February 22, 2011	Kitt Peak	Spacewatch	V	520 m	MPC · JPL
797315	2011 DV_{1}	—	February 22, 2011	Kitt Peak	Spacewatch	HNS	730 m	MPC · JPL
797316	2011 DO_{3}	—	February 23, 2011	Kitt Peak	Spacewatch	·	990 m	MPC · JPL
797317	2011 DJ_{7}	—	February 25, 2011	Mount Lemmon	Mount Lemmon Survey	·	1.5 km	MPC · JPL
797318	2011 DH_{9}	—	February 25, 2011	Mount Lemmon	Mount Lemmon Survey	·	840 m	MPC · JPL
797319	2011 DG_{12}	—	February 7, 2011	Mount Lemmon	Mount Lemmon Survey	·	570 m	MPC · JPL
797320	2011 DB_{15}	—	February 25, 2011	Mount Lemmon	Mount Lemmon Survey	·	1.4 km	MPC · JPL
797321	2011 DM_{16}	—	November 20, 2009	Mount Lemmon	Mount Lemmon Survey	THM	1.8 km	MPC · JPL
797322	2011 DT_{16}	—	February 25, 2011	Mount Lemmon	Mount Lemmon Survey	·	1.7 km	MPC · JPL
797323	2011 DZ_{30}	—	February 25, 2011	Mount Lemmon	Mount Lemmon Survey	·	1.9 km	MPC · JPL
797324	2011 DA_{39}	—	October 27, 2005	Kitt Peak	Spacewatch	(5)	810 m	MPC · JPL
797325	2011 DW_{47}	—	January 8, 2011	Mount Lemmon	Mount Lemmon Survey	·	1.3 km	MPC · JPL
797326	2011 DX_{52}	—	February 22, 2011	Kitt Peak	Spacewatch	H	380 m	MPC · JPL
797327	2011 DZ_{53}	—	September 5, 2013	Kitt Peak	Spacewatch	AGN	940 m	MPC · JPL
797328	2011 DA_{55}	—	October 4, 2016	Mount Lemmon	Mount Lemmon Survey	·	610 m	MPC · JPL
797329	2011 DC_{56}	—	February 25, 2011	Mount Lemmon	Mount Lemmon Survey	·	1.2 km	MPC · JPL
797330	2011 DK_{56}	—	February 25, 2011	Mount Lemmon	Mount Lemmon Survey	·	1.2 km	MPC · JPL
797331	2011 DQ_{56}	—	February 25, 2011	Mount Lemmon	Mount Lemmon Survey	·	2.0 km	MPC · JPL
797332	2011 DW_{56}	—	February 22, 2011	Kitt Peak	Spacewatch	·	1.2 km	MPC · JPL
797333	2011 DU_{59}	—	February 26, 2011	Mount Lemmon	Mount Lemmon Survey	·	1.1 km	MPC · JPL
797334	2011 DX_{60}	—	February 25, 2011	Mount Lemmon	Mount Lemmon Survey	·	1.5 km	MPC · JPL
797335	2011 DY_{60}	—	February 26, 2011	Mount Lemmon	Mount Lemmon Survey	·	1.9 km	MPC · JPL
797336	2011 ES	—	February 8, 2011	Mount Lemmon	Mount Lemmon Survey	·	1.3 km	MPC · JPL
797337	2011 EX_{1}	—	February 13, 2011	Mount Lemmon	Mount Lemmon Survey	·	1.2 km	MPC · JPL
797338	2011 EY_{1}	—	February 7, 2011	Mount Lemmon	Mount Lemmon Survey	·	1.1 km	MPC · JPL
797339	2011 EW_{2}	—	February 10, 2011	Mount Lemmon	Mount Lemmon Survey	H	410 m	MPC · JPL
797340	2011 EU_{18}	—	January 29, 2011	Kitt Peak	Spacewatch	·	1.1 km	MPC · JPL
797341	2011 EV_{22}	—	February 26, 2011	Mount Lemmon	Mount Lemmon Survey	·	1.5 km	MPC · JPL
797342	2011 ER_{29}	—	March 7, 2011	Bergisch Gladbach	W. Bickel	·	1.8 km	MPC · JPL
797343	2011 EP_{32}	—	March 4, 2011	Mount Lemmon	Mount Lemmon Survey	·	1.1 km	MPC · JPL
797344	2011 EH_{34}	—	March 4, 2011	Mount Lemmon	Mount Lemmon Survey	MRX	730 m	MPC · JPL
797345	2011 EU_{45}	—	March 10, 2011	Kitt Peak	Spacewatch	·	750 m	MPC · JPL
797346	2011 EC_{47}	—	March 10, 2011	Dauban	C. Rinner, F. Kugel	·	1.3 km	MPC · JPL
797347	2011 EM_{47}	—	March 4, 2011	Wildberg	R. Apitzsch	·	1.7 km	MPC · JPL
797348	2011 EJ_{57}	—	March 12, 2011	Mount Lemmon	Mount Lemmon Survey	·	2.1 km	MPC · JPL
797349	2011 EA_{59}	—	March 12, 2011	Mount Lemmon	Mount Lemmon Survey	·	1.4 km	MPC · JPL
797350	2011 EG_{59}	—	March 12, 2011	Mount Lemmon	Mount Lemmon Survey	·	1.4 km	MPC · JPL
797351	2011 EB_{61}	—	March 12, 2011	Mount Lemmon	Mount Lemmon Survey	·	1.4 km	MPC · JPL
797352	2011 EB_{64}	—	March 9, 2011	Mount Lemmon	Mount Lemmon Survey	MRX	830 m	MPC · JPL
797353	2011 EB_{65}	—	March 9, 2011	Mount Lemmon	Mount Lemmon Survey	·	1.1 km	MPC · JPL
797354	2011 EH_{67}	—	March 10, 2011	Kitt Peak	Spacewatch	EOS	1.2 km	MPC · JPL
797355	2011 EN_{67}	—	February 8, 2011	Mount Lemmon	Mount Lemmon Survey	NYS	620 m	MPC · JPL
797356	2011 EA_{76}	—	March 4, 2011	Mount Lemmon	Mount Lemmon Survey	PHO	580 m	MPC · JPL
797357	2011 EC_{76}	—	March 4, 2011	Catalina	CSS	T_{j} (2.82)	1.9 km	MPC · JPL
797358	2011 EP_{79}	—	February 9, 2011	Mount Lemmon	Mount Lemmon Survey	·	2.5 km	MPC · JPL
797359	2011 EN_{80}	—	March 14, 2011	Mount Lemmon	Mount Lemmon Survey	·	1.5 km	MPC · JPL
797360	2011 EV_{88}	—	March 3, 2011	Mayhill	E. Schwab	DOR	1.8 km	MPC · JPL
797361	2011 EC_{89}	—	March 1, 2011	Mount Lemmon	Mount Lemmon Survey	·	1.3 km	MPC · JPL
797362	2011 EM_{89}	—	March 5, 2011	Mount Lemmon	Mount Lemmon Survey	·	1.2 km	MPC · JPL
797363	2011 EA_{95}	—	December 15, 2006	Kitt Peak	Spacewatch	·	710 m	MPC · JPL
797364	2011 EC_{95}	—	March 9, 2011	Mount Lemmon	Mount Lemmon Survey	·	1.1 km	MPC · JPL
797365	2011 ED_{95}	—	March 14, 2011	Mount Lemmon	Mount Lemmon Survey	critical	1.1 km	MPC · JPL
797366	2011 EW_{95}	—	March 10, 2011	Catalina	CSS	ERI	1.1 km	MPC · JPL
797367	2011 EW_{96}	—	March 11, 2011	Kitt Peak	Spacewatch	·	760 m	MPC · JPL
797368	2011 EV_{99}	—	March 1, 2011	Catalina	CSS	·	1.6 km	MPC · JPL
797369	2011 EY_{100}	—	March 2, 2011	Kitt Peak	Spacewatch	·	1.3 km	MPC · JPL
797370	2011 EL_{103}	—	March 2, 2011	Mount Lemmon	Mount Lemmon Survey	VER	1.9 km	MPC · JPL
797371	2011 EV_{104}	—	March 2, 2011	Kitt Peak	Spacewatch	·	890 m	MPC · JPL
797372	2011 EM_{105}	—	March 6, 2011	Kitt Peak	Spacewatch	·	1.6 km	MPC · JPL
797373	2011 EJ_{108}	—	March 11, 2011	Mount Lemmon	Mount Lemmon Survey	·	1.5 km	MPC · JPL
797374	2011 EX_{110}	—	March 14, 2011	Mount Lemmon	Mount Lemmon Survey	·	2.2 km	MPC · JPL
797375	2011 EK_{113}	—	January 29, 2011	Mount Lemmon	Mount Lemmon Survey	EOS	1.4 km	MPC · JPL
797376	2011 EM_{114}	—	March 13, 2011	Kitt Peak	Spacewatch	·	1.4 km	MPC · JPL
797377	2011 EO_{114}	—	March 8, 2011	Mount Lemmon	Mount Lemmon Survey	·	1.4 km	MPC · JPL
797378	2011 EH_{115}	—	March 6, 2011	Mount Lemmon	Mount Lemmon Survey	·	1.3 km	MPC · JPL
797379	2011 EW_{115}	—	March 10, 2011	Kitt Peak	Spacewatch	·	1.7 km	MPC · JPL
797380	2011 FG_{2}	—	March 25, 2011	Mount Lemmon	Mount Lemmon Survey	·	780 m	MPC · JPL
797381	2011 FL_{5}	—	March 24, 2011	Piszkés-tető	K. Sárneczky, Z. Kuli	·	1.3 km	MPC · JPL
797382	2011 FZ_{13}	—	March 27, 2011	Mount Lemmon	Mount Lemmon Survey	VER	1.8 km	MPC · JPL
797383	2011 FM_{14}	—	March 28, 2011	Mount Lemmon	Mount Lemmon Survey	·	690 m	MPC · JPL
797384	2011 FB_{15}	—	March 28, 2011	Mount Lemmon	Mount Lemmon Survey	·	1.1 km	MPC · JPL
797385	2011 FG_{15}	—	March 28, 2011	Mount Lemmon	Mount Lemmon Survey	AEO	780 m	MPC · JPL
797386	2011 FT_{25}	—	March 29, 2011	Piszkés-tető	K. Sárneczky, Z. Kuli	·	2.1 km	MPC · JPL
797387	2011 FW_{34}	—	February 25, 2011	Kitt Peak	Spacewatch	·	1.4 km	MPC · JPL
797388	2011 FA_{49}	—	March 30, 2011	Mount Lemmon	Mount Lemmon Survey	URS	2.6 km	MPC · JPL
797389	2011 FA_{52}	—	March 28, 2011	Mount Lemmon	Mount Lemmon Survey	HOF	1.9 km	MPC · JPL
797390	2011 FG_{55}	—	December 29, 2005	Kitt Peak	Spacewatch	AEO	750 m	MPC · JPL
797391	2011 FY_{66}	—	March 27, 2011	Mount Lemmon	Mount Lemmon Survey	·	1.4 km	MPC · JPL
797392	2011 FZ_{88}	—	March 25, 2011	Haleakala	Pan-STARRS 1	·	1.4 km	MPC · JPL
797393	2011 FZ_{90}	—	March 28, 2011	Mount Lemmon	Mount Lemmon Survey	·	1.8 km	MPC · JPL
797394	2011 FV_{95}	—	March 29, 2011	Mount Lemmon	Mount Lemmon Survey	GAL	980 m	MPC · JPL
797395	2011 FF_{96}	—	March 29, 2011	Mount Lemmon	Mount Lemmon Survey	EOS	1.3 km	MPC · JPL
797396	2011 FJ_{98}	—	March 30, 2011	Mount Lemmon	Mount Lemmon Survey	·	1.2 km	MPC · JPL
797397	2011 FM_{109}	—	September 19, 2017	Haleakala	Pan-STARRS 1	·	920 m	MPC · JPL
797398	2011 FP_{110}	—	April 1, 2011	Mount Lemmon	Mount Lemmon Survey	DOR	1.8 km	MPC · JPL
797399	2011 FS_{111}	—	April 1, 2011	Mount Lemmon	Mount Lemmon Survey	·	630 m	MPC · JPL
797400	2011 FL_{112}	—	September 28, 2008	Mount Lemmon	Mount Lemmon Survey	·	1.2 km	MPC · JPL

== 797401–797500 ==
back to top

Designation			Discovery			Properties		Ref
Permanent	Provisional	Named after	Date	Site	Discoverer(s)	Category	Diam.	Ref
797401	2011 FV_{114}	—	April 2, 2011	Mount Lemmon	Mount Lemmon Survey	·	1.7 km	MPC · JPL
797402	2011 FU_{116}	—	April 2, 2011	Mount Lemmon	Mount Lemmon Survey	·	2.1 km	MPC · JPL
797403	2011 FJ_{118}	—	April 2, 2011	Mount Lemmon	Mount Lemmon Survey	·	1.4 km	MPC · JPL
797404	2011 FU_{119}	—	April 2, 2011	Mount Lemmon	Mount Lemmon Survey	·	1.2 km	MPC · JPL
797405	2011 FN_{121}	—	April 6, 2011	Mount Lemmon	Mount Lemmon Survey	GEF	730 m	MPC · JPL
797406	2011 FN_{122}	—	April 5, 2011	Mount Lemmon	Mount Lemmon Survey	·	1.2 km	MPC · JPL
797407	2011 FD_{123}	—	April 5, 2011	Mount Lemmon	Mount Lemmon Survey	·	1.4 km	MPC · JPL
797408	2011 FK_{123}	—	April 5, 2011	Mount Lemmon	Mount Lemmon Survey	·	1.4 km	MPC · JPL
797409	2011 FD_{124}	—	September 3, 2008	Kitt Peak	Spacewatch	·	1.4 km	MPC · JPL
797410	2011 FW_{139}	—	April 5, 2011	Mount Lemmon	Mount Lemmon Survey	·	1.3 km	MPC · JPL
797411	2011 FL_{146}	—	October 16, 2009	Mount Lemmon	Mount Lemmon Survey	·	760 m	MPC · JPL
797412	2011 FB_{155}	—	March 27, 2011	Mount Lemmon	Mount Lemmon Survey	·	1.3 km	MPC · JPL
797413	2011 FF_{155}	—	May 21, 2004	Kitt Peak	Spacewatch	·	770 m	MPC · JPL
797414	2011 FG_{156}	—	April 1, 2011	Mount Lemmon	Mount Lemmon Survey	·	1.0 km	MPC · JPL
797415	2011 FS_{159}	—	April 1, 2016	Haleakala	Pan-STARRS 1	·	1.3 km	MPC · JPL
797416	2011 FD_{161}	—	August 8, 2004	Anderson Mesa	LONEOS	·	1.6 km	MPC · JPL
797417	2011 FC_{162}	—	October 28, 2014	Haleakala	Pan-STARRS 1	VER	2.0 km	MPC · JPL
797418	2011 FX_{164}	—	March 7, 2016	Haleakala	Pan-STARRS 1	·	1.9 km	MPC · JPL
797419	2011 FS_{165}	—	October 3, 2013	Haleakala	Pan-STARRS 1	·	1.3 km	MPC · JPL
797420	2011 FX_{165}	—	March 16, 2016	Haleakala	Pan-STARRS 1	·	1.4 km	MPC · JPL
797421	2011 FM_{166}	—	November 23, 2014	Haleakala	Pan-STARRS 1	·	2.3 km	MPC · JPL
797422	2011 FE_{168}	—	March 26, 2011	Haleakala	Pan-STARRS 1	·	1.8 km	MPC · JPL
797423	2011 FF_{168}	—	March 27, 2011	Mount Lemmon	Mount Lemmon Survey	·	1.2 km	MPC · JPL
797424	2011 FG_{168}	—	March 27, 2011	Kitt Peak	Spacewatch	·	1.1 km	MPC · JPL
797425	2011 FH_{170}	—	October 3, 2018	Haleakala	Pan-STARRS 2	·	1.5 km	MPC · JPL
797426	2011 FK_{170}	—	October 28, 2017	Haleakala	Pan-STARRS 1	DOR	1.5 km	MPC · JPL
797427	2011 FP_{171}	—	March 25, 2011	Haleakala	Pan-STARRS 1	·	1.8 km	MPC · JPL
797428	2011 GV_{1}	—	March 11, 2011	Kitt Peak	Spacewatch	·	1.5 km	MPC · JPL
797429	2011 GC_{2}	—	April 1, 2011	Kitt Peak	Spacewatch	·	1.8 km	MPC · JPL
797430	2011 GT_{5}	—	April 2, 2011	Mount Lemmon	Mount Lemmon Survey	·	1.4 km	MPC · JPL
797431	2011 GY_{8}	—	April 2, 2011	Mount Lemmon	Mount Lemmon Survey	·	1.3 km	MPC · JPL
797432	2011 GJ_{9}	—	April 2, 2011	Mount Lemmon	Mount Lemmon Survey	·	1.3 km	MPC · JPL
797433	2011 GE_{18}	—	March 30, 2011	Mount Lemmon	Mount Lemmon Survey	·	930 m	MPC · JPL
797434	2011 GT_{18}	—	April 2, 2011	Mount Lemmon	Mount Lemmon Survey	·	1.6 km	MPC · JPL
797435	2011 GY_{19}	—	April 2, 2011	Mount Lemmon	Mount Lemmon Survey	·	2.0 km	MPC · JPL
797436	2011 GT_{28}	—	April 1, 2011	Kitt Peak	Spacewatch	AGN	840 m	MPC · JPL
797437	2011 GS_{39}	—	March 27, 2011	Mount Lemmon	Mount Lemmon Survey	·	1.5 km	MPC · JPL
797438	2011 GH_{40}	—	March 14, 2004	Kitt Peak	Spacewatch	·	760 m	MPC · JPL
797439	2011 GG_{41}	—	March 2, 2011	Kitt Peak	Spacewatch	·	1.6 km	MPC · JPL
797440	2011 GU_{43}	—	April 4, 2011	Mount Lemmon	Mount Lemmon Survey	·	1.5 km	MPC · JPL
797441	2011 GJ_{76}	—	March 26, 2011	Mount Lemmon	Mount Lemmon Survey	·	1.5 km	MPC · JPL
797442	2011 GH_{91}	—	April 12, 2011	Mount Lemmon	Mount Lemmon Survey	·	2.1 km	MPC · JPL
797443	2011 GW_{93}	—	April 6, 2011	Mount Lemmon	Mount Lemmon Survey	·	1.5 km	MPC · JPL
797444	2011 GX_{93}	—	April 12, 2011	Mount Lemmon	Mount Lemmon Survey	·	1.1 km	MPC · JPL
797445	2011 GE_{95}	—	April 3, 2011	Haleakala	Pan-STARRS 1	·	2.2 km	MPC · JPL
797446	2011 GC_{97}	—	August 1, 2016	Haleakala	Pan-STARRS 1	·	710 m	MPC · JPL
797447	2011 GL_{97}	—	September 6, 2013	Mount Lemmon	Mount Lemmon Survey	·	1.5 km	MPC · JPL
797448	2011 GR_{102}	—	April 11, 2011	Mount Lemmon	Mount Lemmon Survey	·	1.9 km	MPC · JPL
797449	2011 GK_{103}	—	April 1, 2011	Mount Lemmon	Mount Lemmon Survey	·	1.2 km	MPC · JPL
797450	2011 GS_{105}	—	April 13, 2011	Kitt Peak	Spacewatch	·	1.9 km	MPC · JPL
797451	2011 GT_{106}	—	April 13, 2011	Kitt Peak	Spacewatch	·	1.5 km	MPC · JPL
797452	2011 GG_{107}	—	April 12, 2011	Mount Lemmon	Mount Lemmon Survey	·	1.1 km	MPC · JPL
797453	2011 GV_{109}	—	April 13, 2011	Kitt Peak	Spacewatch	·	2.0 km	MPC · JPL
797454	2011 HX_{3}	—	April 21, 2011	Bergisch Gladbach	W. Bickel	·	1.6 km	MPC · JPL
797455	2011 HJ_{7}	—	April 26, 2011	Mount Lemmon	Mount Lemmon Survey	APO	120 m	MPC · JPL
797456	2011 HX_{87}	—	April 28, 2011	Mount Lemmon	Mount Lemmon Survey	·	1.4 km	MPC · JPL
797457	2011 HM_{90}	—	April 21, 2011	Haleakala	Pan-STARRS 1	DOR	1.6 km	MPC · JPL
797458	2011 HJ_{105}	—	October 8, 2012	Haleakala	Pan-STARRS 1	·	1.1 km	MPC · JPL
797459	2011 HN_{106}	—	February 20, 2015	Haleakala	Pan-STARRS 1	·	1.6 km	MPC · JPL
797460	2011 HS_{110}	—	April 26, 2011	Mount Lemmon	Mount Lemmon Survey	·	1.4 km	MPC · JPL
797461	2011 HX_{110}	—	April 26, 2011	Mount Lemmon	Mount Lemmon Survey	·	2.1 km	MPC · JPL
797462	2011 HC_{112}	—	April 23, 2011	Haleakala	Pan-STARRS 1	·	1.4 km	MPC · JPL
797463	2011 HO_{114}	—	April 24, 2011	Mount Lemmon	Mount Lemmon Survey	·	2.3 km	MPC · JPL
797464	2011 JW_{14}	—	May 8, 2011	Kitt Peak	Spacewatch	PHO	690 m	MPC · JPL
797465	2011 JW_{22}	—	February 27, 2006	Mount Lemmon	Mount Lemmon Survey	·	1.4 km	MPC · JPL
797466	2011 JO_{32}	—	May 1, 2011	Haleakala	Pan-STARRS 1	·	1.4 km	MPC · JPL
797467	2011 JE_{35}	—	May 8, 2011	Mount Lemmon	Mount Lemmon Survey	H	420 m	MPC · JPL
797468	2011 JF_{37}	—	May 9, 2011	Mount Lemmon	Mount Lemmon Survey	DOR	1.7 km	MPC · JPL
797469	2011 JR_{38}	—	May 3, 2011	Mount Lemmon	Mount Lemmon Survey	·	930 m	MPC · JPL
797470	2011 JS_{38}	—	May 9, 2011	Mount Lemmon	Mount Lemmon Survey	·	1.5 km	MPC · JPL
797471	2011 JM_{39}	—	May 4, 2011	Mount Lemmon	Mount Lemmon Survey	·	2.3 km	MPC · JPL
797472	2011 KS_{13}	—	May 22, 2011	Mount Lemmon	Mount Lemmon Survey	H	470 m	MPC · JPL
797473	2011 KU_{14}	—	May 25, 2011	Mount Lemmon	Mount Lemmon Survey	·	2.4 km	MPC · JPL
797474	2011 KC_{35}	—	October 9, 2008	Mount Lemmon	Mount Lemmon Survey	·	970 m	MPC · JPL
797475	2011 KD_{38}	—	May 22, 2011	Mount Lemmon	Mount Lemmon Survey	·	1.3 km	MPC · JPL
797476	2011 KP_{50}	—	June 28, 2016	Haleakala	Pan-STARRS 1	BRA	1.2 km	MPC · JPL
797477	2011 KC_{51}	—	August 24, 2012	Kitt Peak	Spacewatch	·	1.6 km	MPC · JPL
797478	2011 KS_{53}	—	May 13, 2015	Mount Lemmon	Mount Lemmon Survey	·	730 m	MPC · JPL
797479	2011 KA_{55}	—	November 9, 2013	Mount Lemmon	Mount Lemmon Survey	·	2.6 km	MPC · JPL
797480	2011 KN_{55}	—	May 24, 2011	Haleakala	Pan-STARRS 1	·	1.7 km	MPC · JPL
797481	2011 KL_{56}	—	May 23, 2011	Mount Lemmon	Mount Lemmon Survey	·	1.1 km	MPC · JPL
797482	2011 KF_{57}	—	May 24, 2011	Haleakala	Pan-STARRS 1	·	1.2 km	MPC · JPL
797483	2011 KQ_{58}	—	May 24, 2011	Mount Lemmon	Mount Lemmon Survey	·	1.3 km	MPC · JPL
797484	2011 KE_{59}	—	May 29, 2011	Mount Lemmon	Mount Lemmon Survey	·	1.6 km	MPC · JPL
797485	2011 KL_{60}	—	May 23, 2011	Mount Lemmon	Mount Lemmon Survey	BRA	1.3 km	MPC · JPL
797486	2011 LB_{23}	—	June 4, 2011	Mount Lemmon	Mount Lemmon Survey	·	1.7 km	MPC · JPL
797487	2011 LF_{32}	—	December 21, 2014	Haleakala	Pan-STARRS 1	·	2.6 km	MPC · JPL
797488	2011 LK_{34}	—	June 4, 2011	Mount Lemmon	Mount Lemmon Survey	AGN	860 m	MPC · JPL
797489	2011 MU	—	June 23, 2011	Catalina	CSS	APO · PHA	310 m	MPC · JPL
797490	2011 MV_{1}	—	June 25, 2011	Mount Lemmon	Mount Lemmon Survey	AMO	330 m	MPC · JPL
797491	2011 MG_{7}	—	June 4, 2011	Mount Lemmon	Mount Lemmon Survey	·	940 m	MPC · JPL
797492	2011 MJ_{8}	—	June 24, 2011	Mount Lemmon	Mount Lemmon Survey	·	760 m	MPC · JPL
797493	2011 MT_{11}	—	September 11, 2007	Mount Lemmon	Mount Lemmon Survey	·	830 m	MPC · JPL
797494	2011 NO_{5}	—	August 18, 2006	Kitt Peak	Spacewatch	THM	1.7 km	MPC · JPL
797495	2011 OT_{8}	—	July 26, 2011	Haleakala	Pan-STARRS 1	BRG	1.1 km	MPC · JPL
797496	2011 OD_{17}	—	July 27, 2011	Haleakala	Pan-STARRS 1	·	680 m	MPC · JPL
797497	2011 OW_{36}	—	August 1, 2011	Haleakala	Pan-STARRS 1	NYS	950 m	MPC · JPL
797498	2011 OY_{36}	—	August 1, 2011	Haleakala	Pan-STARRS 1	·	910 m	MPC · JPL
797499	2011 OK_{40}	—	July 26, 2011	Haleakala	Pan-STARRS 1	KOR	1.2 km	MPC · JPL
797500	2011 OV_{61}	—	July 28, 2011	Haleakala	Pan-STARRS 1	·	1.5 km	MPC · JPL

== 797501–797600 ==
back to top

Designation			Discovery			Properties		Ref
Permanent	Provisional	Named after	Date	Site	Discoverer(s)	Category	Diam.	Ref
797501	2011 OX_{62}	—	July 28, 2011	Haleakala	Pan-STARRS 1	·	1.3 km	MPC · JPL
797502	2011 OF_{70}	—	October 11, 2012	Haleakala	Pan-STARRS 1	·	2.0 km	MPC · JPL
797503	2011 OR_{72}	—	July 28, 2011	Haleakala	Pan-STARRS 1	WIT	700 m	MPC · JPL
797504	2011 OZ_{75}	—	July 28, 2011	Haleakala	Pan-STARRS 1	EOS	1.5 km	MPC · JPL
797505	2011 OH_{77}	—	July 28, 2011	Haleakala	Pan-STARRS 1	EOS	1.2 km	MPC · JPL
797506	2011 OK_{77}	—	July 28, 2011	Haleakala	Pan-STARRS 1	·	1.4 km	MPC · JPL
797507	2011 PN	—	August 2, 2011	Haleakala	Pan-STARRS 1	H	370 m	MPC · JPL
797508	2011 PT_{1}	—	August 4, 2011	Siding Spring	SSS	AMO	310 m	MPC · JPL
797509	2011 PD_{17}	—	August 1, 2011	Siding Spring	SSS	·	1.1 km	MPC · JPL
797510	2011 PS_{17}	—	October 19, 2012	Mount Lemmon	Mount Lemmon Survey	·	2.0 km	MPC · JPL
797511	2011 PG_{18}	—	July 14, 2016	Haleakala	Pan-STARRS 1	·	1.6 km	MPC · JPL
797512	2011 PK_{18}	—	July 9, 2016	Haleakala	Pan-STARRS 1	·	1.5 km	MPC · JPL
797513	2011 PH_{19}	—	February 26, 2014	Haleakala	Pan-STARRS 1	·	920 m	MPC · JPL
797514	2011 PK_{19}	—	December 23, 2017	Haleakala	Pan-STARRS 1	·	1.1 km	MPC · JPL
797515	2011 PO_{19}	—	January 26, 2014	Haleakala	Pan-STARRS 1	DOR	1.5 km	MPC · JPL
797516	2011 PS_{20}	—	August 7, 2016	Haleakala	Pan-STARRS 1	TIR	2.0 km	MPC · JPL
797517	2011 PF_{22}	—	January 21, 2015	Haleakala	Pan-STARRS 1	·	2.1 km	MPC · JPL
797518	2011 PK_{22}	—	August 1, 2011	Haleakala	Pan-STARRS 1	·	1.9 km	MPC · JPL
797519	2011 PC_{24}	—	August 2, 2011	Haleakala	Pan-STARRS 1	·	2.5 km	MPC · JPL
797520	2011 QW_{1}	—	October 29, 2008	Kitt Peak	Spacewatch	·	400 m	MPC · JPL
797521	2011 QC_{22}	—	July 28, 2011	Haleakala	Pan-STARRS 1	ERI	1.2 km	MPC · JPL
797522	2011 QW_{29}	—	August 24, 2011	Haleakala	Pan-STARRS 1	·	960 m	MPC · JPL
797523	2011 QQ_{35}	—	August 27, 2011	Westfield	International Astronomical Search Collaboration	·	1.9 km	MPC · JPL
797524	2011 QS_{46}	—	June 8, 2011	Haleakala	Pan-STARRS 1	·	1.3 km	MPC · JPL
797525	2011 QB_{50}	—	March 6, 2008	Mount Lemmon	Mount Lemmon Survey	·	410 m	MPC · JPL
797526	2011 QX_{50}	—	February 20, 2009	Kitt Peak	Spacewatch	·	860 m	MPC · JPL
797527	2011 QS_{53}	—	August 31, 2011	Haleakala	Pan-STARRS 1	·	1.9 km	MPC · JPL
797528	2011 QL_{61}	—	August 31, 2011	Haleakala	Pan-STARRS 1	·	1.0 km	MPC · JPL
797529	2011 QR_{71}	—	August 28, 2011	Puebla de Don Fadrique	OAM	PHO	900 m	MPC · JPL
797530	2011 QM_{77}	—	August 23, 2011	Haleakala	Pan-STARRS 1	·	2.1 km	MPC · JPL
797531	2011 QH_{86}	—	August 26, 2011	Haleakala	Pan-STARRS 1	·	2.8 km	MPC · JPL
797532	2011 QK_{93}	—	October 15, 2004	Mount Lemmon	Mount Lemmon Survey	·	860 m	MPC · JPL
797533	2011 QC_{96}	—	August 31, 2011	Siding Spring	SSS	(1547)	1.5 km	MPC · JPL
797534	2011 QT_{101}	—	May 21, 2015	Haleakala	Pan-STARRS 1	·	1.7 km	MPC · JPL
797535	2011 QE_{102}	—	July 12, 2016	Mount Lemmon	Mount Lemmon Survey	·	1.7 km	MPC · JPL
797536	2011 QN_{102}	—	August 27, 2011	Haleakala	Pan-STARRS 1	·	2.5 km	MPC · JPL
797537	2011 QD_{103}	—	January 10, 2014	Mount Lemmon	Mount Lemmon Survey	·	1.1 km	MPC · JPL
797538	2011 QQ_{103}	—	August 23, 2011	Haleakala	Pan-STARRS 1	·	860 m	MPC · JPL
797539	2011 QY_{103}	—	August 24, 2011	Haleakala	Pan-STARRS 1	·	1.9 km	MPC · JPL
797540	2011 QK_{108}	—	September 4, 2016	Mount Lemmon	Mount Lemmon Survey	·	1.2 km	MPC · JPL
797541	2011 QK_{111}	—	August 23, 2011	Haleakala	Pan-STARRS 1	AGN	840 m	MPC · JPL
797542	2011 QA_{113}	—	August 24, 2011	Haleakala	Pan-STARRS 1	·	1.1 km	MPC · JPL
797543	2011 QH_{114}	—	August 30, 2011	Haleakala	Pan-STARRS 1	·	1.8 km	MPC · JPL
797544	2011 QS_{115}	—	August 24, 2011	Haleakala	Pan-STARRS 1	·	1.4 km	MPC · JPL
797545	2011 RP	—	September 4, 2011	Haleakala	Pan-STARRS 1	·	1.1 km	MPC · JPL
797546	2011 RY_{7}	—	September 4, 2011	Haleakala	Pan-STARRS 1	·	1.3 km	MPC · JPL
797547	2011 RE_{22}	—	September 8, 2011	Haleakala	Pan-STARRS 1	T_{j} (2.99)	2.7 km	MPC · JPL
797548	2011 RQ_{23}	—	September 4, 2011	Haleakala	Pan-STARRS 1	·	1.6 km	MPC · JPL
797549	2011 RT_{23}	—	February 10, 2014	Haleakala	Pan-STARRS 1	·	1.1 km	MPC · JPL
797550	2011 RV_{23}	—	September 7, 2011	Kitt Peak	Spacewatch	(895)	2.3 km	MPC · JPL
797551	2011 RO_{24}	—	September 4, 2011	Haleakala	Pan-STARRS 1	(895)	2.2 km	MPC · JPL
797552	2011 RC_{28}	—	September 6, 2011	Haleakala	Pan-STARRS 1	·	890 m	MPC · JPL
797553	2011 RS_{33}	—	September 4, 2011	Haleakala	Pan-STARRS 1	T_{j} (2.99) · 3:2 · (6124)	3.7 km	MPC · JPL
797554	2011 RK_{34}	—	September 2, 2011	Haleakala	Pan-STARRS 1	BRA	1.3 km	MPC · JPL
797555	2011 RK_{39}	—	September 2, 2011	Haleakala	Pan-STARRS 1	·	2.0 km	MPC · JPL
797556	2011 RL_{39}	—	September 8, 2011	Kitt Peak	Spacewatch	·	1.8 km	MPC · JPL
797557	2011 RT_{39}	—	September 4, 2011	Haleakala	Pan-STARRS 1	·	1.5 km	MPC · JPL
797558	2011 RY_{40}	—	September 4, 2011	Haleakala	Pan-STARRS 1	·	1.7 km	MPC · JPL
797559	2011 RO_{41}	—	September 4, 2011	Haleakala	Pan-STARRS 1	·	1.6 km	MPC · JPL
797560	2011 SA_{2}	—	September 2, 2011	Westfield	International Astronomical Search Collaboration	·	2.1 km	MPC · JPL
797561	2011 SX_{9}	—	September 4, 2011	Haleakala	Pan-STARRS 1	·	1.0 km	MPC · JPL
797562	2011 ST_{11}	—	September 4, 2011	Haleakala	Pan-STARRS 1	·	1.5 km	MPC · JPL
797563	2011 SA_{12}	—	September 19, 2011	Mount Lemmon	Mount Lemmon Survey	·	1.7 km	MPC · JPL
797564	2011 SX_{14}	—	September 19, 2011	Mount Lemmon	Mount Lemmon Survey	·	2.4 km	MPC · JPL
797565	2011 SJ_{24}	—	September 21, 2011	Kitt Peak	Spacewatch	·	2.0 km	MPC · JPL
797566	2011 SU_{31}	—	August 27, 2011	Haleakala	Pan-STARRS 1	·	1.7 km	MPC · JPL
797567	2011 SX_{35}	—	November 12, 2006	Mount Lemmon	Mount Lemmon Survey	·	1.7 km	MPC · JPL
797568	2011 SO_{38}	—	September 4, 2011	Haleakala	Pan-STARRS 1	·	2.1 km	MPC · JPL
797569	2011 SG_{42}	—	September 18, 2011	Mount Lemmon	Mount Lemmon Survey	·	820 m	MPC · JPL
797570	2011 SL_{55}	—	September 23, 2011	Haleakala	Pan-STARRS 1	T_{j} (2.97)	2.9 km	MPC · JPL
797571	2011 SP_{68}	—	September 24, 2011	Catalina	CSS	AMO	160 m	MPC · JPL
797572	2011 SN_{82}	—	September 20, 2011	Mount Lemmon	Mount Lemmon Survey	·	1.2 km	MPC · JPL
797573	2011 SM_{91}	—	September 22, 2011	Kitt Peak	Spacewatch	·	2.3 km	MPC · JPL
797574	2011 SL_{95}	—	September 4, 2011	Haleakala	Pan-STARRS 1	·	1.5 km	MPC · JPL
797575	2011 SH_{110}	—	August 27, 2011	Haleakala	Pan-STARRS 1	NYS	950 m	MPC · JPL
797576	2011 SL_{110}	—	June 25, 2011	Mount Lemmon	Mount Lemmon Survey	NYS	1.0 km	MPC · JPL
797577	2011 SS_{111}	—	September 19, 2011	Haleakala	Pan-STARRS 1	·	990 m	MPC · JPL
797578	2011 SF_{113}	—	August 26, 2011	Kitt Peak	Spacewatch	NYS	1.1 km	MPC · JPL
797579	2011 SQ_{113}	—	August 27, 2011	Zelenchukskaya	T. V. Krjačko	·	1.8 km	MPC · JPL
797580	2011 SS_{124}	—	September 20, 2011	Kitt Peak	Spacewatch	·	1.5 km	MPC · JPL
797581	2011 SW_{130}	—	September 20, 2011	Kitt Peak	Spacewatch	·	1.3 km	MPC · JPL
797582	2011 SP_{134}	—	September 26, 2011	Puebla de Don Fadrique	OAM	·	2.6 km	MPC · JPL
797583	2011 SB_{139}	—	September 4, 2007	Mount Lemmon	Mount Lemmon Survey	·	930 m	MPC · JPL
797584	2011 SP_{139}	—	September 23, 2011	Haleakala	Pan-STARRS 1	·	1.3 km	MPC · JPL
797585	2011 SW_{142}	—	September 23, 2011	Haleakala	Pan-STARRS 1	·	1.1 km	MPC · JPL
797586	2011 SC_{145}	—	September 4, 2011	Haleakala	Pan-STARRS 1	·	1.4 km	MPC · JPL
797587	2011 SP_{145}	—	September 26, 2011	Mount Lemmon	Mount Lemmon Survey	·	1.1 km	MPC · JPL
797588	2011 SZ_{148}	—	September 26, 2011	Mount Lemmon	Mount Lemmon Survey	·	1.4 km	MPC · JPL
797589	2011 ST_{151}	—	September 26, 2011	Haleakala	Pan-STARRS 1	AGN	860 m	MPC · JPL
797590	2011 SF_{155}	—	September 26, 2011	Haleakala	Pan-STARRS 1	·	2.1 km	MPC · JPL
797591	2011 SP_{160}	—	September 23, 2011	Kitt Peak	Spacewatch	·	1.4 km	MPC · JPL
797592	2011 SX_{167}	—	September 20, 2011	Kitt Peak	Spacewatch	·	1.4 km	MPC · JPL
797593	2011 SY_{193}	—	September 26, 2011	Haleakala	Pan-STARRS 1	·	1.2 km	MPC · JPL
797594	2011 SU_{197}	—	September 2, 2011	Haleakala	Pan-STARRS 1	·	1.6 km	MPC · JPL
797595	2011 SP_{199}	—	October 19, 2006	Mount Lemmon	Mount Lemmon Survey	·	2.0 km	MPC · JPL
797596	2011 SL_{208}	—	September 20, 2011	Mount Lemmon	Mount Lemmon Survey	·	2.1 km	MPC · JPL
797597	2011 SX_{214}	—	September 21, 2011	Kitt Peak	Spacewatch	·	1.3 km	MPC · JPL
797598	2011 SV_{219}	—	March 1, 2008	Kitt Peak	Spacewatch	·	2.0 km	MPC · JPL
797599	2011 SU_{220}	—	September 26, 2011	Mount Lemmon	Mount Lemmon Survey	·	2.1 km	MPC · JPL
797600	2011 SP_{223}	—	September 20, 2011	Kitt Peak	Spacewatch	EOS	1.4 km	MPC · JPL

== 797601–797700 ==
back to top

Designation			Discovery			Properties		Ref
Permanent	Provisional	Named after	Date	Site	Discoverer(s)	Category	Diam.	Ref
797601	2011 SZ_{224}	—	September 29, 2011	Mount Lemmon	Mount Lemmon Survey	·	980 m	MPC · JPL
797602	2011 SF_{232}	—	September 24, 2011	Mount Lemmon	Mount Lemmon Survey	NYS	910 m	MPC · JPL
797603	2011 SK_{232}	—	September 30, 2011	Piszkéstető	K. Sárneczky	·	1.5 km	MPC · JPL
797604	2011 SZ_{232}	—	September 26, 2011	Bergisch Gladbach	W. Bickel	·	1.0 km	MPC · JPL
797605	2011 SE_{243}	—	January 14, 2008	Kitt Peak	Spacewatch	·	1.4 km	MPC · JPL
797606	2011 ST_{244}	—	September 26, 2011	Haleakala	Pan-STARRS 1	·	1.4 km	MPC · JPL
797607	2011 SP_{260}	—	September 30, 2011	Kitt Peak	Spacewatch	·	2.0 km	MPC · JPL
797608	2011 SL_{263}	—	September 4, 2011	Kitt Peak	Spacewatch	·	2.1 km	MPC · JPL
797609	2011 SN_{269}	—	September 21, 2000	Kitt Peak	Deep Ecliptic Survey	·	1.9 km	MPC · JPL
797610	2011 SL_{270}	—	September 8, 2011	Kitt Peak	Spacewatch	·	1.0 km	MPC · JPL
797611	2011 SV_{270}	—	September 26, 2011	Haleakala	Pan-STARRS 1	·	1.2 km	MPC · JPL
797612	2011 SY_{275}	—	August 26, 2011	Piszkéstető	K. Sárneczky	·	1.2 km	MPC · JPL
797613	2011 SA_{284}	—	December 23, 2012	Haleakala	Pan-STARRS 1	·	2.4 km	MPC · JPL
797614	2011 SF_{284}	—	June 5, 2016	Haleakala	Pan-STARRS 1	·	2.0 km	MPC · JPL
797615	2011 SP_{286}	—	September 29, 2011	Kitt Peak	Spacewatch	·	1.9 km	MPC · JPL
797616	2011 SS_{286}	—	January 5, 2013	Kitt Peak	Spacewatch	·	2.1 km	MPC · JPL
797617	2011 SK_{288}	—	September 26, 2011	Haleakala	Pan-STARRS 1	TIR	1.8 km	MPC · JPL
797618	2011 SR_{289}	—	September 27, 2011	Mount Lemmon	Mount Lemmon Survey	·	1.6 km	MPC · JPL
797619	2011 SV_{291}	—	September 24, 2011	Haleakala	Pan-STARRS 1	·	1.7 km	MPC · JPL
797620	2011 SW_{291}	—	September 29, 2011	Mount Lemmon	Mount Lemmon Survey	·	1.5 km	MPC · JPL
797621	2011 ST_{292}	—	September 23, 2011	Haleakala	Pan-STARRS 1	·	1.9 km	MPC · JPL
797622	2011 SE_{295}	—	April 5, 2014	Haleakala	Pan-STARRS 1	·	750 m	MPC · JPL
797623	2011 SX_{297}	—	September 20, 2011	Haleakala	Pan-STARRS 1	·	950 m	MPC · JPL
797624	2011 SB_{303}	—	September 22, 2011	Kitt Peak	Spacewatch	·	2.1 km	MPC · JPL
797625	2011 SA_{305}	—	September 27, 2011	Mount Lemmon	Mount Lemmon Survey	·	980 m	MPC · JPL
797626	2011 SX_{305}	—	September 12, 2015	Haleakala	Pan-STARRS 1	·	660 m	MPC · JPL
797627	2011 SF_{306}	—	September 23, 2011	Haleakala	Pan-STARRS 1	·	1.6 km	MPC · JPL
797628	2011 SS_{308}	—	September 18, 2011	Mount Lemmon	Mount Lemmon Survey	KOR	1.1 km	MPC · JPL
797629	2011 SH_{309}	—	September 23, 2011	Haleakala	Pan-STARRS 1	·	750 m	MPC · JPL
797630	2011 SB_{311}	—	September 22, 2011	Kitt Peak	Spacewatch	·	1.6 km	MPC · JPL
797631	2011 SN_{311}	—	September 18, 2011	Mount Lemmon	Mount Lemmon Survey	·	1.8 km	MPC · JPL
797632	2011 SX_{312}	—	September 26, 2011	Haleakala	Pan-STARRS 1	EOS	1.2 km	MPC · JPL
797633	2011 SE_{314}	—	September 26, 2011	Mount Lemmon	Mount Lemmon Survey	AGN	890 m	MPC · JPL
797634	2011 ST_{314}	—	September 24, 2011	Haleakala	Pan-STARRS 1	·	1.7 km	MPC · JPL
797635	2011 SX_{317}	—	September 24, 2011	Haleakala	Pan-STARRS 1	·	1.1 km	MPC · JPL
797636	2011 SZ_{317}	—	September 24, 2011	Mount Lemmon	Mount Lemmon Survey	·	1.4 km	MPC · JPL
797637	2011 SO_{321}	—	September 26, 2011	Mount Lemmon	Mount Lemmon Survey	·	1.8 km	MPC · JPL
797638	2011 SC_{323}	—	September 24, 2011	Mount Lemmon	Mount Lemmon Survey	·	1.2 km	MPC · JPL
797639	2011 SV_{328}	—	September 23, 2011	Kitt Peak	Spacewatch	3:2	3.7 km	MPC · JPL
797640	2011 SP_{329}	—	September 20, 2011	Haleakala	Pan-STARRS 1	·	1.4 km	MPC · JPL
797641	2011 SR_{329}	—	September 30, 2011	Kitt Peak	Spacewatch	·	1.2 km	MPC · JPL
797642	2011 SB_{332}	—	September 28, 2011	Kitt Peak	Spacewatch	EOS	1.3 km	MPC · JPL
797643	2011 SG_{332}	—	September 22, 2011	Kitt Peak	Spacewatch	·	1.7 km	MPC · JPL
797644	2011 SR_{332}	—	September 24, 2011	Mount Lemmon	Mount Lemmon Survey	·	1.3 km	MPC · JPL
797645	2011 ST_{332}	—	September 18, 2011	Mount Lemmon	Mount Lemmon Survey	·	1.2 km	MPC · JPL
797646	2011 SY_{333}	—	October 12, 2007	Mount Lemmon	Mount Lemmon Survey	(5)	810 m	MPC · JPL
797647	2011 SM_{334}	—	September 24, 2011	Haleakala	Pan-STARRS 1	·	1.4 km	MPC · JPL
797648	2011 SO_{334}	—	September 24, 2011	Haleakala	Pan-STARRS 1	EOS	1.1 km	MPC · JPL
797649	2011 SR_{334}	—	September 23, 2011	Haleakala	Pan-STARRS 1	·	1.2 km	MPC · JPL
797650	2011 SN_{336}	—	September 18, 2011	Mount Lemmon	Mount Lemmon Survey	·	1.3 km	MPC · JPL
797651	2011 SZ_{340}	—	September 29, 2011	Kitt Peak	Spacewatch	THM	1.5 km	MPC · JPL
797652	2011 SR_{344}	—	September 20, 2011	Haleakala	Pan-STARRS 1	EOS	1.2 km	MPC · JPL
797653	2011 SN_{346}	—	September 21, 2011	Kitt Peak	Spacewatch	TEL	790 m	MPC · JPL
797654	2011 SA_{348}	—	September 26, 2011	Mount Lemmon	Mount Lemmon Survey	·	1.2 km	MPC · JPL
797655	2011 SL_{348}	—	September 19, 2011	Mount Lemmon	Mount Lemmon Survey	EOS	1.3 km	MPC · JPL
797656	2011 SW_{352}	—	September 29, 2011	Mount Lemmon	Mount Lemmon Survey	·	2.2 km	MPC · JPL
797657	2011 SK_{353}	—	September 24, 2011	Mount Lemmon	Mount Lemmon Survey	·	1.7 km	MPC · JPL
797658	2011 SY_{353}	—	September 25, 2011	Haleakala	Pan-STARRS 1	·	2.0 km	MPC · JPL
797659	2011 SE_{354}	—	September 26, 2011	Mount Lemmon	Mount Lemmon Survey	EOS	1.1 km	MPC · JPL
797660	2011 SK_{354}	—	September 27, 2011	Mount Lemmon	Mount Lemmon Survey	·	2.2 km	MPC · JPL
797661	2011 SG_{355}	—	September 24, 2011	Haleakala	Pan-STARRS 1	·	1.9 km	MPC · JPL
797662	2011 SS_{356}	—	September 29, 2011	Kitt Peak	Spacewatch	EOS	1.4 km	MPC · JPL
797663	2011 SN_{357}	—	September 22, 2011	Mount Lemmon	Mount Lemmon Survey	·	1.8 km	MPC · JPL
797664	2011 SC_{358}	—	September 23, 2011	Haleakala	Pan-STARRS 1	·	1.8 km	MPC · JPL
797665	2011 SH_{358}	—	September 24, 2011	Mount Lemmon	Mount Lemmon Survey	·	1.9 km	MPC · JPL
797666	2011 SQ_{359}	—	September 19, 2011	Mount Lemmon	Mount Lemmon Survey	·	2.8 km	MPC · JPL
797667	2011 SS_{359}	—	September 24, 2011	Haleakala	Pan-STARRS 1	RAF	630 m	MPC · JPL
797668	2011 SK_{364}	—	September 26, 2011	Haleakala	Pan-STARRS 1	·	1.0 km	MPC · JPL
797669	2011 TV_{13}	—	September 23, 2011	Catalina	CSS	·	1.3 km	MPC · JPL
797670	2011 TV_{14}	—	December 24, 2006	Kitt Peak	Spacewatch	·	2.3 km	MPC · JPL
797671	2011 TM_{15}	—	June 9, 2011	Haleakala	Pan-STARRS 1	·	1.9 km	MPC · JPL
797672	2011 TZ_{18}	—	October 7, 2011	Westfield	International Astronomical Search Collaboration	·	2.1 km	MPC · JPL
797673	2011 TB_{19}	—	June 18, 2015	Mount Lemmon	Mount Lemmon Survey	·	2.0 km	MPC · JPL
797674	2011 TB_{21}	—	October 1, 2011	Mount Lemmon	Mount Lemmon Survey	·	1.1 km	MPC · JPL
797675	2011 TS_{21}	—	October 3, 2011	Mount Lemmon	Mount Lemmon Survey	·	1.1 km	MPC · JPL
797676	2011 TJ_{22}	—	October 1, 2011	Kitt Peak	Spacewatch	·	2.3 km	MPC · JPL
797677	2011 TZ_{23}	—	October 3, 2011	Mount Lemmon	Mount Lemmon Survey	·	1.6 km	MPC · JPL
797678	2011 TD_{24}	—	October 1, 2011	Kitt Peak	Spacewatch	EOS	1.4 km	MPC · JPL
797679	2011 UT_{4}	—	August 20, 2001	Cerro Tololo	Deep Ecliptic Survey	·	1.4 km	MPC · JPL
797680	2011 UU_{4}	—	October 18, 2011	Mount Lemmon	Mount Lemmon Survey	KOR	1.1 km	MPC · JPL
797681	2011 UY_{4}	—	October 18, 2011	Mount Lemmon	Mount Lemmon Survey	EOS	1.2 km	MPC · JPL
797682	2011 UH_{7}	—	October 18, 2011	Mount Lemmon	Mount Lemmon Survey	·	910 m	MPC · JPL
797683	2011 UO_{11}	—	September 18, 2011	Mount Lemmon	Mount Lemmon Survey	EOS	1.3 km	MPC · JPL
797684	2011 UT_{20}	—	October 19, 2011	Haleakala	Pan-STARRS 1	APO · PHA	280 m	MPC · JPL
797685	2011 UX_{20}	—	September 26, 2008	Kitt Peak	Spacewatch	·	730 m	MPC · JPL
797686	2011 UB_{25}	—	September 28, 2011	Mount Lemmon	Mount Lemmon Survey	·	860 m	MPC · JPL
797687	2011 UR_{32}	—	September 23, 2011	Kitt Peak	Spacewatch	·	2.8 km	MPC · JPL
797688	2011 UK_{45}	—	September 24, 2011	Haleakala	Pan-STARRS 1	EOS	1.2 km	MPC · JPL
797689	2011 UQ_{45}	—	October 19, 2011	Haleakala	Pan-STARRS 1	·	2.5 km	MPC · JPL
797690	2011 UL_{66}	—	October 20, 2011	Mount Lemmon	Mount Lemmon Survey	·	2.2 km	MPC · JPL
797691	2011 UQ_{66}	—	October 20, 2011	Mount Lemmon	Mount Lemmon Survey	·	1.9 km	MPC · JPL
797692	2011 UT_{78}	—	October 19, 2011	Kitt Peak	Spacewatch	·	1.6 km	MPC · JPL
797693	2011 UL_{81}	—	October 19, 2011	Kitt Peak	Spacewatch	·	2.4 km	MPC · JPL
797694	2011 UO_{81}	—	October 19, 2011	Kitt Peak	Spacewatch	·	2.3 km	MPC · JPL
797695	2011 UH_{93}	—	October 18, 2011	Mount Lemmon	Mount Lemmon Survey	·	2.0 km	MPC · JPL
797696	2011 UC_{96}	—	September 21, 2011	Kitt Peak	Spacewatch	·	2.0 km	MPC · JPL
797697	2011 UB_{98}	—	October 19, 2011	Kitt Peak	Spacewatch	·	1.4 km	MPC · JPL
797698	2011 UW_{100}	—	October 20, 2011	Mount Lemmon	Mount Lemmon Survey	·	2.2 km	MPC · JPL
797699	2011 UM_{121}	—	September 23, 2011	Haleakala	Pan-STARRS 1	·	1.0 km	MPC · JPL
797700	2011 UM_{133}	—	September 24, 2011	Mount Lemmon	Mount Lemmon Survey	(5)	680 m	MPC · JPL

== 797701–797800 ==
back to top

Designation			Discovery			Properties		Ref
Permanent	Provisional	Named after	Date	Site	Discoverer(s)	Category	Diam.	Ref
797701	2011 UQ_{136}	—	October 20, 2011	Mount Lemmon	Mount Lemmon Survey	·	1.2 km	MPC · JPL
797702	2011 UH_{137}	—	October 20, 2011	Mount Lemmon	Mount Lemmon Survey	EOS	1.5 km	MPC · JPL
797703	2011 UZ_{167}	—	October 24, 2011	Haleakala	Pan-STARRS 1	PHO	560 m	MPC · JPL
797704	2011 UF_{181}	—	October 24, 2011	Haleakala	Pan-STARRS 1	·	2.0 km	MPC · JPL
797705	2011 UR_{192}	—	August 31, 2005	Junk Bond	D. Healy	THM	1.9 km	MPC · JPL
797706	2011 UC_{196}	—	October 24, 2011	Haleakala	Pan-STARRS 1	·	2.3 km	MPC · JPL
797707	2011 UV_{207}	—	October 24, 2011	Mount Lemmon	Mount Lemmon Survey	·	980 m	MPC · JPL
797708	2011 UE_{208}	—	October 24, 2011	Mount Lemmon	Mount Lemmon Survey	PAD	1.1 km	MPC · JPL
797709	2011 UR_{212}	—	October 24, 2011	Mount Lemmon	Mount Lemmon Survey	·	1.9 km	MPC · JPL
797710	2011 UT_{212}	—	October 2, 2011	Bergisch Gladbach	W. Bickel	·	1.1 km	MPC · JPL
797711	2011 UH_{214}	—	October 19, 2011	Mount Lemmon	Mount Lemmon Survey	·	2.1 km	MPC · JPL
797712	2011 UA_{215}	—	October 24, 2011	Mount Lemmon	Mount Lemmon Survey	·	1.5 km	MPC · JPL
797713	2011 UB_{216}	—	August 30, 2005	Kitt Peak	Spacewatch	·	2.1 km	MPC · JPL
797714	2011 UJ_{216}	—	October 24, 2011	Mount Lemmon	Mount Lemmon Survey	·	1.9 km	MPC · JPL
797715	2011 UT_{220}	—	February 8, 2019	Mount Lemmon	Mount Lemmon Survey	·	1.9 km	MPC · JPL
797716	2011 UV_{222}	—	October 24, 2011	Mount Lemmon	Mount Lemmon Survey	·	1.5 km	MPC · JPL
797717	2011 UX_{231}	—	October 24, 2011	Mount Lemmon	Mount Lemmon Survey	·	1.3 km	MPC · JPL
797718	2011 UO_{235}	—	October 19, 2011	Kitt Peak	Spacewatch	·	1.9 km	MPC · JPL
797719	2011 UN_{237}	—	October 18, 2011	Kitt Peak	Spacewatch	·	2.0 km	MPC · JPL
797720	2011 UN_{248}	—	October 26, 2011	Haleakala	Pan-STARRS 1	·	1.5 km	MPC · JPL
797721	2011 UH_{249}	—	October 26, 2011	Haleakala	Pan-STARRS 1	·	2.3 km	MPC · JPL
797722	2011 US_{249}	—	October 22, 2011	Kitt Peak	Spacewatch	(5)	780 m	MPC · JPL
797723	2011 UA_{251}	—	October 26, 2011	Haleakala	Pan-STARRS 1	·	2.1 km	MPC · JPL
797724	2011 UC_{257}	—	October 24, 2011	Haleakala	Pan-STARRS 1	·	2.3 km	MPC · JPL
797725	2011 US_{258}	—	October 24, 2011	Haleakala	Pan-STARRS 1	(6355)	2.3 km	MPC · JPL
797726	2011 UO_{260}	—	October 25, 2011	Haleakala	Pan-STARRS 1	·	2.0 km	MPC · JPL
797727	2011 UY_{261}	—	October 25, 2011	Haleakala	Pan-STARRS 1	(5)	760 m	MPC · JPL
797728	2011 UG_{263}	—	October 25, 2011	Haleakala	Pan-STARRS 1	·	2.4 km	MPC · JPL
797729	2011 UK_{274}	—	October 30, 2011	Mount Lemmon	Mount Lemmon Survey	HOF	2.1 km	MPC · JPL
797730	2011 UK_{287}	—	September 1, 2005	Kitt Peak	Spacewatch	·	2.4 km	MPC · JPL
797731	2011 UC_{291}	—	October 22, 2011	Mount Lemmon	Mount Lemmon Survey	LIX	3.3 km	MPC · JPL
797732	2011 UO_{293}	—	October 26, 2011	Haleakala	Pan-STARRS 1	·	830 m	MPC · JPL
797733	2011 UJ_{294}	—	October 26, 2011	Haleakala	Pan-STARRS 1	·	2.1 km	MPC · JPL
797734	2011 UA_{312}	—	October 30, 2011	Kitt Peak	Spacewatch	NYS	930 m	MPC · JPL
797735	2011 UE_{329}	—	October 23, 2011	Mount Lemmon	Mount Lemmon Survey	EUP	2.1 km	MPC · JPL
797736	2011 UR_{329}	—	October 23, 2011	Mount Lemmon	Mount Lemmon Survey	(5)	980 m	MPC · JPL
797737	2011 UK_{334}	—	October 31, 2011	Mount Lemmon	Mount Lemmon Survey	·	1.4 km	MPC · JPL
797738	2011 UO_{334}	—	October 23, 2011	Mount Lemmon	Mount Lemmon Survey	·	2.1 km	MPC · JPL
797739	2011 UX_{339}	—	October 18, 2011	Kitt Peak	Spacewatch	·	1.5 km	MPC · JPL
797740	2011 UU_{341}	—	October 18, 2011	Mount Lemmon	Mount Lemmon Survey	·	1.2 km	MPC · JPL
797741	2011 UC_{344}	—	October 19, 2011	Kitt Peak	Spacewatch	·	2.2 km	MPC · JPL
797742	2011 UM_{346}	—	November 25, 2006	Kitt Peak	Spacewatch	·	1.8 km	MPC · JPL
797743	2011 UW_{347}	—	October 19, 2011	Haleakala	Pan-STARRS 1	·	2.3 km	MPC · JPL
797744	2011 UU_{348}	—	October 19, 2011	Mount Lemmon	Mount Lemmon Survey	THM	1.7 km	MPC · JPL
797745	2011 UV_{348}	—	March 19, 2009	Mount Lemmon	Mount Lemmon Survey	·	1.2 km	MPC · JPL
797746	2011 UA_{349}	—	October 19, 2011	Mount Lemmon	Mount Lemmon Survey	·	2.1 km	MPC · JPL
797747	2011 UW_{349}	—	September 26, 2006	Mount Lemmon	Mount Lemmon Survey	·	1.6 km	MPC · JPL
797748	2011 UL_{352}	—	October 20, 2011	Kitt Peak	Spacewatch	·	1.7 km	MPC · JPL
797749	2011 UE_{353}	—	September 28, 2011	Kitt Peak	Spacewatch	·	2.3 km	MPC · JPL
797750	2011 UL_{364}	—	October 22, 2011	Mount Lemmon	Mount Lemmon Survey	·	1.4 km	MPC · JPL
797751	2011 UZ_{367}	—	November 11, 2006	Kitt Peak	Spacewatch	·	1.4 km	MPC · JPL
797752	2011 UC_{375}	—	October 23, 2011	Mount Lemmon	Mount Lemmon Survey	VER	2.1 km	MPC · JPL
797753	2011 UD_{376}	—	October 23, 2011	Mount Lemmon	Mount Lemmon Survey	EOS	1.4 km	MPC · JPL
797754	2011 UE_{376}	—	October 23, 2011	Mount Lemmon	Mount Lemmon Survey	EOS	1.3 km	MPC · JPL
797755	2011 UW_{377}	—	October 23, 2011	Mount Lemmon	Mount Lemmon Survey	(5)	890 m	MPC · JPL
797756	2011 UJ_{380}	—	October 24, 2011	Mount Lemmon	Mount Lemmon Survey	VER	2.0 km	MPC · JPL
797757	2011 UD_{381}	—	October 24, 2011	Mount Lemmon	Mount Lemmon Survey	·	1.8 km	MPC · JPL
797758	2011 UG_{390}	—	September 23, 2011	Catalina	CSS	·	930 m	MPC · JPL
797759	2011 UN_{399}	—	October 31, 2011	Mount Lemmon	Mount Lemmon Survey	·	1.2 km	MPC · JPL
797760	2011 UW_{399}	—	October 31, 2011	Mount Lemmon	Mount Lemmon Survey	·	1.9 km	MPC · JPL
797761	2011 UJ_{409}	—	September 26, 2011	Mount Lemmon	Mount Lemmon Survey	·	1.2 km	MPC · JPL
797762	2011 UH_{415}	—	October 20, 2011	Mount Lemmon	Mount Lemmon Survey	·	800 m	MPC · JPL
797763	2011 UV_{417}	—	September 30, 2011	Kitt Peak	Spacewatch	·	2.0 km	MPC · JPL
797764	2011 UA_{424}	—	August 3, 2016	Haleakala	Pan-STARRS 1	·	2.4 km	MPC · JPL
797765	2011 UP_{425}	—	October 19, 2011	Mount Lemmon	Mount Lemmon Survey	·	2.2 km	MPC · JPL
797766	2011 UR_{427}	—	October 20, 2011	Mount Lemmon	Mount Lemmon Survey	·	2.4 km	MPC · JPL
797767	2011 UA_{428}	—	April 4, 2014	Haleakala	Pan-STARRS 1	·	1.3 km	MPC · JPL
797768	2011 UR_{431}	—	October 23, 2011	Mount Lemmon	Mount Lemmon Survey	·	1.9 km	MPC · JPL
797769	2011 UQ_{432}	—	October 26, 2011	Haleakala	Pan-STARRS 1	·	690 m	MPC · JPL
797770	2011 UC_{435}	—	October 9, 2015	Haleakala	Pan-STARRS 1	·	820 m	MPC · JPL
797771	2011 UF_{435}	—	October 24, 2011	Westfield	International Astronomical Search Collaboration	T_{j} (2.99)	2.7 km	MPC · JPL
797772	2011 UX_{438}	—	January 10, 2013	Haleakala	Pan-STARRS 1	·	2.0 km	MPC · JPL
797773	2011 UW_{439}	—	October 30, 2011	Mount Lemmon	Mount Lemmon Survey	·	2.3 km	MPC · JPL
797774	2011 UC_{442}	—	October 19, 2011	Mount Lemmon	Mount Lemmon Survey	·	930 m	MPC · JPL
797775	2011 UD_{442}	—	October 26, 2011	Haleakala	Pan-STARRS 1	·	1.2 km	MPC · JPL
797776	2011 UH_{442}	—	September 18, 2015	Mount Lemmon	Mount Lemmon Survey	·	900 m	MPC · JPL
797777	2011 UD_{443}	—	July 28, 2015	Haleakala	Pan-STARRS 1	·	1.1 km	MPC · JPL
797778	2011 UB_{444}	—	October 24, 2011	Haleakala	Pan-STARRS 1	·	1.4 km	MPC · JPL
797779	2011 UB_{448}	—	October 24, 2011	Haleakala	Pan-STARRS 1	·	1.3 km	MPC · JPL
797780	2011 UG_{448}	—	October 26, 2011	Haleakala	Pan-STARRS 1	·	1.3 km	MPC · JPL
797781	2011 UC_{449}	—	October 20, 2011	Mount Lemmon	Mount Lemmon Survey	·	1.6 km	MPC · JPL
797782	2011 UU_{449}	—	October 18, 2011	Kitt Peak	Spacewatch	(5651)	2.1 km	MPC · JPL
797783	2011 UU_{450}	—	October 22, 2011	Kitt Peak	Spacewatch	·	2.6 km	MPC · JPL
797784	2011 UM_{451}	—	April 13, 2002	Kitt Peak	Spacewatch	THB	2.1 km	MPC · JPL
797785	2011 UZ_{452}	—	October 26, 2011	Haleakala	Pan-STARRS 1	·	2.3 km	MPC · JPL
797786	2011 UL_{453}	—	August 2, 2016	Haleakala	Pan-STARRS 1	EOS	1.4 km	MPC · JPL
797787	2011 UU_{453}	—	October 26, 2011	Haleakala	Pan-STARRS 1	·	630 m	MPC · JPL
797788	2011 UF_{454}	—	October 26, 2011	Haleakala	Pan-STARRS 1	·	790 m	MPC · JPL
797789	2011 UP_{454}	—	October 23, 2011	Mount Lemmon	Mount Lemmon Survey	·	540 m	MPC · JPL
797790	2011 UW_{455}	—	October 19, 2011	Mount Lemmon	Mount Lemmon Survey	·	1.5 km	MPC · JPL
797791	2011 UE_{456}	—	October 18, 2011	Kitt Peak	Spacewatch	THM	1.5 km	MPC · JPL
797792	2011 UY_{456}	—	October 23, 2011	Mount Lemmon	Mount Lemmon Survey	·	2.3 km	MPC · JPL
797793	2011 UC_{457}	—	October 19, 2011	Mount Lemmon	Mount Lemmon Survey	·	1.6 km	MPC · JPL
797794	2011 UF_{459}	—	October 20, 2011	Mount Lemmon	Mount Lemmon Survey	TIR	2.0 km	MPC · JPL
797795	2011 UO_{459}	—	August 20, 2015	Kitt Peak	Spacewatch	·	1.4 km	MPC · JPL
797796	2011 UK_{460}	—	October 24, 2011	Haleakala	Pan-STARRS 1	·	2.2 km	MPC · JPL
797797	2011 UB_{461}	—	October 26, 2011	Haleakala	Pan-STARRS 1	KOR	1.1 km	MPC · JPL
797798	2011 UG_{463}	—	October 19, 2011	Mount Lemmon	Mount Lemmon Survey	·	1.9 km	MPC · JPL
797799	2011 UP_{463}	—	October 24, 2011	Haleakala	Pan-STARRS 1	VER	1.9 km	MPC · JPL
797800	2011 UX_{463}	—	October 22, 2011	Mount Lemmon	Mount Lemmon Survey	·	1.9 km	MPC · JPL

== 797801–797900 ==
back to top

Designation			Discovery			Properties		Ref
Permanent	Provisional	Named after	Date	Site	Discoverer(s)	Category	Diam.	Ref
797801	2011 UJ_{464}	—	October 24, 2011	Haleakala	Pan-STARRS 1	LIX	2.3 km	MPC · JPL
797802	2011 UM_{465}	—	February 14, 2013	Mount Lemmon	Mount Lemmon Survey	·	1.1 km	MPC · JPL
797803	2011 UR_{467}	—	October 25, 2011	Haleakala	Pan-STARRS 1	·	1.1 km	MPC · JPL
797804	2011 UA_{469}	—	October 20, 2011	Mount Lemmon	Mount Lemmon Survey	KOR	1.1 km	MPC · JPL
797805	2011 UB_{469}	—	October 25, 2011	Haleakala	Pan-STARRS 1	·	1.3 km	MPC · JPL
797806	2011 UK_{470}	—	October 23, 2011	Mount Lemmon	Mount Lemmon Survey	·	790 m	MPC · JPL
797807	2011 UO_{471}	—	October 19, 2011	Mount Lemmon	Mount Lemmon Survey	EOS	1.4 km	MPC · JPL
797808	2011 UC_{473}	—	October 21, 2011	Kitt Peak	Spacewatch	·	2.4 km	MPC · JPL
797809	2011 UZ_{474}	—	October 24, 2011	Haleakala	Pan-STARRS 1	·	2.0 km	MPC · JPL
797810	2011 UH_{475}	—	October 26, 2011	Haleakala	Pan-STARRS 1	EOS	1.4 km	MPC · JPL
797811	2011 UL_{475}	—	October 24, 2011	Haleakala	Pan-STARRS 1	·	1.9 km	MPC · JPL
797812	2011 UK_{476}	—	October 24, 2011	Haleakala	Pan-STARRS 1	·	1.9 km	MPC · JPL
797813	2011 UC_{479}	—	October 22, 2011	Mount Lemmon	Mount Lemmon Survey	·	1.4 km	MPC · JPL
797814	2011 UO_{479}	—	October 25, 2011	Haleakala	Pan-STARRS 1	·	2.1 km	MPC · JPL
797815	2011 UB_{480}	—	October 26, 2011	Haleakala	Pan-STARRS 1	·	1.7 km	MPC · JPL
797816	2011 UQ_{480}	—	October 26, 2011	Haleakala	Pan-STARRS 1	·	2.3 km	MPC · JPL
797817	2011 UE_{482}	—	October 25, 2011	Haleakala	Pan-STARRS 1	·	2.4 km	MPC · JPL
797818	2011 US_{484}	—	October 26, 2011	Haleakala	Pan-STARRS 1	·	1.4 km	MPC · JPL
797819	2011 UD_{485}	—	October 24, 2011	Haleakala	Pan-STARRS 1	·	1.3 km	MPC · JPL
797820	2011 UA_{487}	—	October 26, 2011	Haleakala	Pan-STARRS 1	TIR	2.2 km	MPC · JPL
797821	2011 UG_{487}	—	October 23, 2011	Kitt Peak	Spacewatch	·	2.0 km	MPC · JPL
797822	2011 UN_{488}	—	October 28, 2011	Mount Lemmon	Mount Lemmon Survey	·	1.9 km	MPC · JPL
797823	2011 UP_{490}	—	October 25, 2011	Haleakala	Pan-STARRS 1	VER	1.8 km	MPC · JPL
797824	2011 UG_{491}	—	October 24, 2011	Haleakala	Pan-STARRS 1	VER	1.9 km	MPC · JPL
797825	2011 UD_{492}	—	October 21, 2011	Mount Lemmon	Mount Lemmon Survey	·	2.4 km	MPC · JPL
797826	2011 UY_{494}	—	October 24, 2011	Haleakala	Pan-STARRS 1	·	2.1 km	MPC · JPL
797827	2011 UD_{495}	—	October 20, 2011	Mount Lemmon	Mount Lemmon Survey	·	1.9 km	MPC · JPL
797828	2011 UQ_{495}	—	October 20, 2011	Mount Lemmon	Mount Lemmon Survey	·	2.1 km	MPC · JPL
797829	2011 UC_{496}	—	October 19, 2011	Mount Lemmon	Mount Lemmon Survey	·	2.1 km	MPC · JPL
797830	2011 UH_{496}	—	October 24, 2011	Haleakala	Pan-STARRS 1	·	2.4 km	MPC · JPL
797831	2011 UM_{496}	—	October 24, 2011	Haleakala	Pan-STARRS 1	·	2.1 km	MPC · JPL
797832	2011 UP_{496}	—	October 24, 2011	Haleakala	Pan-STARRS 1	VER	1.9 km	MPC · JPL
797833	2011 UU_{496}	—	October 25, 2011	Haleakala	Pan-STARRS 1	·	2.2 km	MPC · JPL
797834	2011 UW_{496}	—	October 24, 2011	Haleakala	Pan-STARRS 1	·	2.2 km	MPC · JPL
797835	2011 UG_{497}	—	October 24, 2011	Haleakala	Pan-STARRS 1	·	1.7 km	MPC · JPL
797836	2011 UW_{497}	—	September 5, 2016	ISON-SSO	L. Elenin	TIR	2.4 km	MPC · JPL
797837	2011 UW_{498}	—	October 20, 2011	Mount Lemmon	Mount Lemmon Survey	·	1.8 km	MPC · JPL
797838	2011 UX_{498}	—	October 31, 2011	Kitt Peak	Spacewatch	EOS	1.3 km	MPC · JPL
797839	2011 UD_{499}	—	October 23, 2011	Mount Lemmon	Mount Lemmon Survey	·	1.8 km	MPC · JPL
797840	2011 UZ_{501}	—	October 20, 2011	Mount Lemmon	Mount Lemmon Survey	HOF	1.7 km	MPC · JPL
797841	2011 UB_{502}	—	October 26, 2011	Haleakala	Pan-STARRS 1	·	1.6 km	MPC · JPL
797842	2011 UG_{502}	—	October 19, 2011	Mount Lemmon	Mount Lemmon Survey	·	1.6 km	MPC · JPL
797843	2011 UU_{502}	—	October 23, 2011	Mount Lemmon	Mount Lemmon Survey	·	2.7 km	MPC · JPL
797844	2011 UY_{502}	—	October 31, 2011	Mount Lemmon	Mount Lemmon Survey	·	630 m	MPC · JPL
797845	2011 UH_{505}	—	October 31, 2011	Mount Lemmon	Mount Lemmon Survey	·	950 m	MPC · JPL
797846	2011 UN_{507}	—	October 25, 2011	Haleakala	Pan-STARRS 1	·	1.2 km	MPC · JPL
797847	2011 UR_{507}	—	October 24, 2011	Haleakala	Pan-STARRS 1	·	990 m	MPC · JPL
797848	2011 UW_{507}	—	October 19, 2011	Mount Lemmon	Mount Lemmon Survey	·	980 m	MPC · JPL
797849	2011 UU_{508}	—	October 18, 2011	Mount Lemmon	Mount Lemmon Survey	·	690 m	MPC · JPL
797850	2011 VX	—	August 26, 2011	Westfield	International Astronomical Search Collaboration	·	1.3 km	MPC · JPL
797851	2011 VO_{4}	—	November 2, 2011	Mount Lemmon	Mount Lemmon Survey	·	2.1 km	MPC · JPL
797852	2011 VT_{21}	—	November 3, 2011	Kitt Peak	Spacewatch	·	1.9 km	MPC · JPL
797853	2011 VC_{22}	—	November 3, 2011	Kitt Peak	Spacewatch	·	2.0 km	MPC · JPL
797854	2011 VD_{25}	—	January 9, 2013	Kitt Peak	Spacewatch	·	2.3 km	MPC · JPL
797855	2011 VE_{25}	—	November 2, 2011	Kitt Peak	Spacewatch	·	610 m	MPC · JPL
797856	2011 VS_{26}	—	November 2, 2011	Mount Lemmon	Mount Lemmon Survey	·	1.1 km	MPC · JPL
797857	2011 VG_{27}	—	November 3, 2011	Mount Lemmon	Mount Lemmon Survey	·	1.1 km	MPC · JPL
797858	2011 VD_{28}	—	November 3, 2011	Mount Lemmon	Mount Lemmon Survey	·	730 m	MPC · JPL
797859	2011 VC_{29}	—	September 6, 2015	Haleakala	Pan-STARRS 1	·	1.2 km	MPC · JPL
797860	2011 VF_{32}	—	November 3, 2011	Kitt Peak	Spacewatch	·	1.3 km	MPC · JPL
797861	2011 VO_{33}	—	November 3, 2011	Kitt Peak	Spacewatch	·	2.0 km	MPC · JPL
797862	2011 VG_{34}	—	November 3, 2011	Mount Lemmon	Mount Lemmon Survey	·	1.9 km	MPC · JPL
797863	2011 VN_{35}	—	November 2, 2011	Kitt Peak	Spacewatch	·	1.6 km	MPC · JPL
797864	2011 VY_{35}	—	November 3, 2011	Kitt Peak	Spacewatch	·	2.0 km	MPC · JPL
797865	2011 VD_{36}	—	November 15, 2011	Mount Lemmon	Mount Lemmon Survey	·	1.3 km	MPC · JPL
797866	2011 VY_{36}	—	November 15, 2011	Mount Lemmon	Mount Lemmon Survey	·	2.0 km	MPC · JPL
797867	2011 VB_{37}	—	November 2, 2011	Mount Lemmon	Mount Lemmon Survey	·	2.1 km	MPC · JPL
797868	2011 VG_{37}	—	November 2, 2011	Mount Lemmon	Mount Lemmon Survey	·	1.9 km	MPC · JPL
797869	2011 VJ_{37}	—	November 1, 2011	Kitt Peak	Spacewatch	·	1.9 km	MPC · JPL
797870	2011 VY_{37}	—	November 3, 2011	Mount Lemmon	Mount Lemmon Survey	·	2.0 km	MPC · JPL
797871	2011 WK_{6}	—	October 6, 2016	Haleakala	Pan-STARRS 1	EOS	1.4 km	MPC · JPL
797872	2011 WO_{9}	—	October 25, 2011	Haleakala	Pan-STARRS 1	·	2.3 km	MPC · JPL
797873	2011 WB_{22}	—	November 17, 2011	Mount Lemmon	Mount Lemmon Survey	·	1.7 km	MPC · JPL
797874	2011 WT_{23}	—	November 17, 2011	Mount Lemmon	Mount Lemmon Survey	EOS	1.4 km	MPC · JPL
797875	2011 WH_{35}	—	October 26, 2011	Haleakala	Pan-STARRS 1	VER	2.0 km	MPC · JPL
797876	2011 WA_{39}	—	November 16, 1998	Kitt Peak	Spacewatch	·	750 m	MPC · JPL
797877	2011 WZ_{39}	—	February 13, 2008	Kitt Peak	Spacewatch	·	2.4 km	MPC · JPL
797878	2011 WC_{42}	—	November 3, 2011	Mount Lemmon	Mount Lemmon Survey	·	3.6 km	MPC · JPL
797879	2011 WW_{51}	—	November 23, 2011	Mount Lemmon	Mount Lemmon Survey	·	2.2 km	MPC · JPL
797880	2011 WL_{60}	—	October 26, 2011	Haleakala	Pan-STARRS 1	·	1.3 km	MPC · JPL
797881	2011 WE_{61}	—	October 26, 2011	Haleakala	Pan-STARRS 1	THM	1.6 km	MPC · JPL
797882	2011 WF_{65}	—	December 12, 2001	Palomar Mountain	NEAT	H	430 m	MPC · JPL
797883	2011 WX_{72}	—	October 25, 2011	Kitt Peak	Spacewatch	·	1.1 km	MPC · JPL
797884	2011 WC_{73}	—	October 31, 2011	Zelenchukskaya	T. V. Krjačko	H	430 m	MPC · JPL
797885	2011 WX_{74}	—	November 23, 2011	Kitt Peak	Spacewatch	T_{j} (2.95)	2.6 km	MPC · JPL
797886	2011 WG_{76}	—	November 23, 2011	Mount Lemmon	Mount Lemmon Survey	EOS	1.2 km	MPC · JPL
797887	2011 WY_{76}	—	September 1, 2005	Kitt Peak	Spacewatch	·	1.9 km	MPC · JPL
797888	2011 WP_{77}	—	October 31, 2011	Kitt Peak	Spacewatch	·	2.1 km	MPC · JPL
797889	2011 WV_{77}	—	October 25, 2011	Haleakala	Pan-STARRS 1	·	2.2 km	MPC · JPL
797890	2011 WJ_{83}	—	November 24, 2011	Haleakala	Pan-STARRS 1	·	2.0 km	MPC · JPL
797891	2011 WZ_{85}	—	May 3, 2008	Kitt Peak	Spacewatch	LUT	2.9 km	MPC · JPL
797892	2011 WH_{96}	—	December 22, 2006	Mount Lemmon	Mount Lemmon Survey	H	430 m	MPC · JPL
797893	2011 WK_{101}	—	November 27, 2011	Mount Lemmon	Mount Lemmon Survey	·	1.2 km	MPC · JPL
797894	2011 WU_{101}	—	October 26, 2011	Haleakala	Pan-STARRS 1	·	2.1 km	MPC · JPL
797895	2011 WQ_{111}	—	November 30, 2011	Mount Lemmon	Mount Lemmon Survey	·	1.7 km	MPC · JPL
797896	2011 WD_{138}	—	October 19, 2011	Kitt Peak	Spacewatch	·	2.5 km	MPC · JPL
797897	2011 WN_{138}	—	October 26, 2011	Haleakala	Pan-STARRS 1	·	2.6 km	MPC · JPL
797898	2011 WB_{143}	—	October 24, 2011	Haleakala	Pan-STARRS 1	·	1.3 km	MPC · JPL
797899	2011 WT_{145}	—	November 25, 2011	Haleakala	Pan-STARRS 1	·	860 m	MPC · JPL
797900	2011 WU_{146}	—	October 20, 2011	Mount Lemmon	Mount Lemmon Survey	·	800 m	MPC · JPL

== 797901–798000 ==
back to top

Designation			Discovery			Properties		Ref
Permanent	Provisional	Named after	Date	Site	Discoverer(s)	Category	Diam.	Ref
797901	2011 WH_{149}	—	November 30, 2011	Mount Lemmon	Mount Lemmon Survey	·	1.8 km	MPC · JPL
797902	2011 WL_{157}	—	April 28, 2014	Cerro Tololo	DECam	·	1.9 km	MPC · JPL
797903	2011 WA_{163}	—	November 23, 2011	Kitt Peak	Spacewatch	·	2.2 km	MPC · JPL
797904	2011 WR_{163}	—	November 28, 2011	Kitt Peak	Spacewatch	·	2.1 km	MPC · JPL
797905	2011 WT_{164}	—	November 25, 2011	Haleakala	Pan-STARRS 1	·	2.0 km	MPC · JPL
797906	2011 WU_{164}	—	November 27, 2011	Mount Lemmon	Mount Lemmon Survey	·	980 m	MPC · JPL
797907	2011 WD_{165}	—	November 18, 2011	Catalina	CSS	·	1.0 km	MPC · JPL
797908	2011 WF_{165}	—	November 20, 2011	Bisei	BATTeRS	·	1.0 km	MPC · JPL
797909	2011 WR_{165}	—	November 16, 2011	Kitt Peak	Spacewatch	·	2.4 km	MPC · JPL
797910	2011 WK_{166}	—	August 12, 2015	Haleakala	Pan-STARRS 1	·	1.0 km	MPC · JPL
797911	2011 WC_{168}	—	June 5, 2014	Haleakala	Pan-STARRS 1	·	2.7 km	MPC · JPL
797912	2011 WH_{168}	—	November 24, 2017	Haleakala	Pan-STARRS 1	EUP	2.4 km	MPC · JPL
797913	2011 WL_{168}	—	February 11, 2013	Catalina	CSS	THB	2.3 km	MPC · JPL
797914	2011 WM_{168}	—	November 6, 2015	Mount Lemmon	Mount Lemmon Survey	·	880 m	MPC · JPL
797915	2011 WO_{169}	—	November 22, 2011	Mount Lemmon	Mount Lemmon Survey	·	1.7 km	MPC · JPL
797916	2011 WW_{169}	—	March 6, 2013	Haleakala	Pan-STARRS 1	·	2.2 km	MPC · JPL
797917	2011 WO_{170}	—	July 25, 2015	Haleakala	Pan-STARRS 1	EUN	890 m	MPC · JPL
797918	2011 WY_{171}	—	November 27, 2011	Mount Lemmon	Mount Lemmon Survey	·	610 m	MPC · JPL
797919	2011 WJ_{173}	—	January 31, 2017	Haleakala	Pan-STARRS 1	·	900 m	MPC · JPL
797920	2011 WT_{176}	—	November 25, 2011	Haleakala	Pan-STARRS 1	·	1.3 km	MPC · JPL
797921	2011 WD_{177}	—	November 16, 2011	Mount Lemmon	Mount Lemmon Survey	VER	1.9 km	MPC · JPL
797922	2011 WA_{179}	—	November 23, 2011	Mount Lemmon	Mount Lemmon Survey	·	1.1 km	MPC · JPL
797923	2011 WF_{179}	—	November 18, 2011	Mount Lemmon	Mount Lemmon Survey	VER	1.8 km	MPC · JPL
797924	2011 WH_{179}	—	November 30, 2011	Kitt Peak	Spacewatch	·	1.2 km	MPC · JPL
797925	2011 WW_{180}	—	November 25, 2011	Haleakala	Pan-STARRS 1	·	2.1 km	MPC · JPL
797926	2011 WK_{181}	—	November 30, 2011	Mount Lemmon	Mount Lemmon Survey	·	1.9 km	MPC · JPL
797927	2011 WX_{182}	—	November 22, 2011	Mount Lemmon	Mount Lemmon Survey	·	1.4 km	MPC · JPL
797928	2011 WZ_{182}	—	November 24, 2011	Mount Lemmon	Mount Lemmon Survey	·	2.1 km	MPC · JPL
797929	2011 WB_{183}	—	November 17, 2011	Mount Lemmon	Mount Lemmon Survey	·	2.2 km	MPC · JPL
797930	2011 WV_{184}	—	April 28, 2014	Cerro Tololo	DECam	·	2.3 km	MPC · JPL
797931	2011 WE_{185}	—	November 26, 2011	Mount Lemmon	Mount Lemmon Survey	·	1.3 km	MPC · JPL
797932	2011 WZ_{186}	—	November 28, 2011	Mount Lemmon	Mount Lemmon Survey	·	2.5 km	MPC · JPL
797933	2011 WN_{187}	—	November 18, 2011	Mount Lemmon	Mount Lemmon Survey	·	1.9 km	MPC · JPL
797934	2011 WR_{187}	—	November 17, 2011	Mount Lemmon	Mount Lemmon Survey	·	2.4 km	MPC · JPL
797935	2011 WF_{188}	—	November 24, 2011	Mount Lemmon	Mount Lemmon Survey	·	2.4 km	MPC · JPL
797936	2011 WE_{189}	—	November 24, 2011	Haleakala	Pan-STARRS 1	MAR	980 m	MPC · JPL
797937	2011 XM_{1}	—	December 4, 2011	Haleakala	Pan-STARRS 1	APO	430 m	MPC · JPL
797938	2011 XH_{6}	—	September 9, 2015	Haleakala	Pan-STARRS 1	·	1.1 km	MPC · JPL
797939	2011 XV_{6}	—	December 6, 2011	Haleakala	Pan-STARRS 1	·	2.0 km	MPC · JPL
797940	2011 YN_{6}	—	September 30, 2006	Kitt Peak	Spacewatch	·	1.2 km	MPC · JPL
797941	2011 YO_{10}	—	January 17, 2001	Haleakala	NEAT	EUP	3.4 km	MPC · JPL
797942	2011 YA_{12}	—	December 24, 2011	Mount Lemmon	Mount Lemmon Survey	·	1.0 km	MPC · JPL
797943	2011 YS_{31}	—	December 26, 2011	Kitt Peak	Spacewatch	·	970 m	MPC · JPL
797944	2011 YR_{49}	—	December 28, 2011	Mount Lemmon	Mount Lemmon Survey	H	410 m	MPC · JPL
797945	2011 YF_{50}	—	November 30, 2011	Mount Lemmon	Mount Lemmon Survey	·	770 m	MPC · JPL
797946	2011 YM_{51}	—	December 31, 2011	Mount Lemmon	Mount Lemmon Survey	·	1.3 km	MPC · JPL
797947	2011 YY_{54}	—	December 29, 2011	Kitt Peak	Spacewatch	·	2.1 km	MPC · JPL
797948	2011 YZ_{64}	—	December 31, 2011	Kitt Peak	Spacewatch	·	1.3 km	MPC · JPL
797949	2011 YL_{66}	—	December 31, 2011	Kitt Peak	Spacewatch	·	1.3 km	MPC · JPL
797950	2011 YP_{68}	—	December 31, 2011	Catalina	CSS	·	1.5 km	MPC · JPL
797951	2011 YM_{74}	—	December 29, 2011	Mount Lemmon	Mount Lemmon Survey	L4	6.6 km	MPC · JPL
797952	2011 YM_{75}	—	October 3, 2021	Kitt Peak	Bok NEO Survey	L4	5.2 km	MPC · JPL
797953	2011 YQ_{79}	—	August 30, 2005	Kitt Peak	Spacewatch	·	1.1 km	MPC · JPL
797954	2011 YK_{80}	—	December 29, 2011	Kitt Peak	Spacewatch	·	1.5 km	MPC · JPL
797955	2011 YK_{85}	—	December 28, 2011	Mount Lemmon	Mount Lemmon Survey	·	540 m	MPC · JPL
797956	2011 YU_{87}	—	January 12, 2018	Haleakala	Pan-STARRS 1	·	2.4 km	MPC · JPL
797957	2011 YX_{89}	—	December 31, 2011	Mount Lemmon	Mount Lemmon Survey	·	930 m	MPC · JPL
797958	2011 YZ_{89}	—	December 9, 2015	Haleakala	Pan-STARRS 1	·	820 m	MPC · JPL
797959	2011 YW_{91}	—	December 29, 2011	Mount Lemmon	Mount Lemmon Survey	KON	1.6 km	MPC · JPL
797960	2011 YQ_{94}	—	December 31, 2011	Kitt Peak	Spacewatch	·	870 m	MPC · JPL
797961	2011 YS_{94}	—	December 30, 2011	Mount Lemmon	Mount Lemmon Survey	·	810 m	MPC · JPL
797962	2011 YB_{95}	—	December 29, 2011	Mount Lemmon	Mount Lemmon Survey	L4	6.3 km	MPC · JPL
797963	2011 YJ_{95}	—	December 24, 2011	Mount Lemmon	Mount Lemmon Survey	·	1.0 km	MPC · JPL
797964	2011 YK_{95}	—	December 29, 2011	Mount Lemmon	Mount Lemmon Survey	·	1.4 km	MPC · JPL
797965	2011 YL_{95}	—	December 27, 2011	Mount Lemmon	Mount Lemmon Survey	EUN	640 m	MPC · JPL
797966	2011 YO_{95}	—	December 29, 2011	Mount Lemmon	Mount Lemmon Survey	·	720 m	MPC · JPL
797967	2011 YS_{95}	—	December 27, 2011	Mount Lemmon	Mount Lemmon Survey	·	780 m	MPC · JPL
797968	2011 YC_{97}	—	December 29, 2011	Mount Lemmon	Mount Lemmon Survey	·	2.1 km	MPC · JPL
797969	2011 YS_{99}	—	December 29, 2011	Kitt Peak	Spacewatch	·	880 m	MPC · JPL
797970	2012 AL_{9}	—	January 2, 2012	Kitt Peak	Spacewatch	·	2.1 km	MPC · JPL
797971	2012 AF_{13}	—	January 4, 2012	Kitt Peak	Spacewatch	·	480 m	MPC · JPL
797972	2012 AW_{22}	—	January 1, 2012	Mount Lemmon	Mount Lemmon Survey	·	710 m	MPC · JPL
797973	2012 AT_{27}	—	August 27, 2014	Haleakala	Pan-STARRS 1	KON	1.7 km	MPC · JPL
797974	2012 AE_{28}	—	January 14, 2012	Kitt Peak	Spacewatch	·	1.3 km	MPC · JPL
797975	2012 AW_{29}	—	January 1, 2012	Mount Lemmon	Mount Lemmon Survey	(1547)	1.2 km	MPC · JPL
797976	2012 AV_{30}	—	February 1, 2017	Mount Lemmon	Mount Lemmon Survey	AGN	890 m	MPC · JPL
797977	2012 AG_{32}	—	January 14, 2012	Mount Lemmon	Mount Lemmon Survey	·	910 m	MPC · JPL
797978	2012 AW_{33}	—	January 2, 2012	Kitt Peak	Spacewatch	AGN	840 m	MPC · JPL
797979	2012 AZ_{33}	—	February 2, 2008	Kitt Peak	Spacewatch	·	970 m	MPC · JPL
797980	2012 AL_{34}	—	January 2, 2012	Kitt Peak	Spacewatch	·	750 m	MPC · JPL
797981	2012 AH_{35}	—	January 2, 2012	Mount Lemmon	Mount Lemmon Survey	·	1.8 km	MPC · JPL
797982	2012 AL_{35}	—	January 2, 2012	Mount Lemmon	Mount Lemmon Survey	·	1.4 km	MPC · JPL
797983	2012 AM_{35}	—	January 2, 2012	Kitt Peak	Spacewatch	(5)	760 m	MPC · JPL
797984	2012 AE_{37}	—	February 17, 2007	Mount Lemmon	Mount Lemmon Survey	·	1.3 km	MPC · JPL
797985	2012 AL_{38}	—	January 2, 2012	Kitt Peak	Spacewatch	·	990 m	MPC · JPL
797986	2012 BX	—	January 16, 2012	Les Engarouines	L. Bernasconi	·	850 m	MPC · JPL
797987	2012 BL_{1}	—	January 2, 2012	Catalina	CSS	·	2.0 km	MPC · JPL
797988	2012 BB_{2}	—	January 17, 2012	Socorro	LINEAR	AMO	240 m	MPC · JPL
797989	2012 BJ_{2}	—	December 27, 2011	Mayhill-ISON	L. Elenin	·	870 m	MPC · JPL
797990	2012 BP_{4}	—	January 30, 2008	Mount Lemmon	Mount Lemmon Survey	·	1.0 km	MPC · JPL
797991	2012 BT_{5}	—	December 29, 2011	Kitt Peak	Spacewatch	L4	5.9 km	MPC · JPL
797992	2012 BB_{8}	—	January 18, 2012	Mount Lemmon	Mount Lemmon Survey	HYG	2.4 km	MPC · JPL
797993	2012 BJ_{8}	—	October 26, 2005	Kitt Peak	Spacewatch	·	1.4 km	MPC · JPL
797994	2012 BG_{12}	—	December 30, 2011	Kitt Peak	Spacewatch	·	930 m	MPC · JPL
797995	2012 BU_{12}	—	January 18, 2012	Mount Lemmon	Mount Lemmon Survey	·	1.0 km	MPC · JPL
797996	2012 BM_{13}	—	January 18, 2012	Kitt Peak	Spacewatch	H	500 m	MPC · JPL
797997	2012 BO_{13}	—	January 19, 2012	Haleakala	Pan-STARRS 1	·	1.2 km	MPC · JPL
797998	2012 BE_{15}	—	December 28, 2011	Mount Lemmon	Mount Lemmon Survey	T_{j} (2.99)	2.5 km	MPC · JPL
797999	2012 BM_{31}	—	January 20, 2012	Kitt Peak	Spacewatch	DOR	1.9 km	MPC · JPL
798000	2012 BQ_{31}	—	January 20, 2012	Mayhill-ISON	L. Elenin	·	1.8 km	MPC · JPL

back to top
