= List of minor planets: 695001–696000 =

The following is a partial list of minor planets, running from minor-planet number 695001 through 696000, inclusive. The primary data for this and other partial lists is based on JPL's "Small-Body Orbital Elements" and data available from the Minor Planet Center. Critical list information is also provided by the MPC, unless otherwise specified from Lowell Observatory. A detailed description of the table's columns and additional sources are given on the main page including a complete list of every page in this series, and a statistical break-up on the dynamical classification of minor planets.

Also see the summary list of all named bodies in numerical and alphabetical order, and the corresponding naming citations for the number range of this particular list. New namings may only be added to this list after official publication, as the preannouncement of names is condemned by the Working Group for Small Bodies Nomenclature of the International Astronomical Union.

Near-Earth obj.	MBA (inner)	MBA (outer)	Centaur
Mars-crosser	MBA (middle)	Jupiter trojan	Trans-Neptunian obj.
Unclassified

== 695001–695100 ==
Designation			Discovery			Properties		Ref
Permanent	Provisional	Named after	Date	Site	Discoverer(s)	Category	Diam.	Ref
695001	2015 UC_{53}	—	April 23, 2011	Haleakala	Pan-STARRS 1	·	560 m	MPC · JPL
695002	2015 UG_{53}	—	September 12, 2015	Haleakala	Pan-STARRS 1	·	2.3 km	MPC · JPL
695003	2015 UT_{53}	—	September 12, 2015	Haleakala	Pan-STARRS 1	·	2.4 km	MPC · JPL
695004	2015 UF_{54}	—	October 25, 2005	Mount Lemmon	Mount Lemmon Survey	·	1.6 km	MPC · JPL
695005	2015 UM_{54}	—	September 12, 2015	Haleakala	Pan-STARRS 1	·	2.1 km	MPC · JPL
695006	2015 UR_{55}	—	April 23, 2011	Haleakala	Pan-STARRS 1	·	650 m	MPC · JPL
695007	2015 UE_{58}	—	March 14, 2012	Mount Lemmon	Mount Lemmon Survey	·	2.4 km	MPC · JPL
695008	2015 UJ_{58}	—	October 8, 2015	Haleakala	Pan-STARRS 1	·	2.2 km	MPC · JPL
695009	2015 UM_{60}	—	April 13, 2013	Kitt Peak	Spacewatch	·	2.6 km	MPC · JPL
695010	2015 UF_{62}	—	September 10, 2010	Kitt Peak	Spacewatch	·	2.3 km	MPC · JPL
695011	2015 UP_{62}	—	October 26, 2011	Haleakala	Pan-STARRS 1	·	1.7 km	MPC · JPL
695012	2015 UW_{64}	—	July 2, 2014	Mount Lemmon	Mount Lemmon Survey	·	1.7 km	MPC · JPL
695013	2015 UE_{65}	—	October 21, 2015	Haleakala	Pan-STARRS 1	·	2.2 km	MPC · JPL
695014	2015 UN_{66}	—	June 27, 2004	Kitt Peak	Spacewatch	·	2.0 km	MPC · JPL
695015	2015 UK_{68}	—	September 15, 2002	Palomar	NEAT	·	620 m	MPC · JPL
695016	2015 UY_{69}	—	February 5, 2013	Kitt Peak	Spacewatch	·	1.5 km	MPC · JPL
695017	2015 UV_{70}	—	August 12, 2015	Haleakala	Pan-STARRS 1	·	1.6 km	MPC · JPL
695018	2015 UA_{74}	—	October 13, 2006	Kitt Peak	Spacewatch	HOF	2.2 km	MPC · JPL
695019	2015 UF_{76}	—	October 24, 2015	Haleakala	Pan-STARRS 1	·	3.0 km	MPC · JPL
695020	2015 UG_{83}	—	August 12, 2015	Haleakala	Pan-STARRS 1	·	2.6 km	MPC · JPL
695021	2015 UO_{87}	—	October 16, 2015	Kitt Peak	Spacewatch	·	1.8 km	MPC · JPL
695022	2015 UP_{87}	—	October 23, 2015	Mount Lemmon	Mount Lemmon Survey	·	2.5 km	MPC · JPL
695023	2015 UU_{87}	—	October 13, 2010	Mount Lemmon	Mount Lemmon Survey	·	1.7 km	MPC · JPL
695024	2015 UV_{87}	—	July 1, 2014	Haleakala	Pan-STARRS 1	·	2.4 km	MPC · JPL
695025	2015 UZ_{87}	—	September 19, 2003	Kitt Peak	Spacewatch	VER	2.6 km	MPC · JPL
695026	2015 UN_{88}	—	July 25, 2014	Haleakala	Pan-STARRS 1	VER	2.1 km	MPC · JPL
695027	2015 UO_{88}	—	October 19, 2015	Haleakala	Pan-STARRS 1	·	1.4 km	MPC · JPL
695028	2015 UX_{88}	—	October 21, 2015	Haleakala	Pan-STARRS 1	·	2.6 km	MPC · JPL
695029	2015 UB_{89}	—	March 20, 2001	Kitt Peak	Spacewatch	·	2.8 km	MPC · JPL
695030	2015 UJ_{89}	—	October 21, 2015	Haleakala	Pan-STARRS 1	·	2.6 km	MPC · JPL
695031	2015 UO_{89}	—	June 17, 2009	Kitt Peak	Spacewatch	TIR	2.2 km	MPC · JPL
695032	2015 UT_{89}	—	October 23, 2015	Mount Lemmon	Mount Lemmon Survey	·	2.5 km	MPC · JPL
695033	2015 UL_{90}	—	October 25, 2015	Haleakala	Pan-STARRS 1	·	1.5 km	MPC · JPL
695034	2015 UX_{97}	—	October 23, 2015	Mount Lemmon	Mount Lemmon Survey	·	2.5 km	MPC · JPL
695035	2015 UY_{97}	—	October 16, 2015	Mount Lemmon	Mount Lemmon Survey	·	630 m	MPC · JPL
695036	2015 UJ_{99}	—	October 25, 2015	Haleakala	Pan-STARRS 1	·	2.6 km	MPC · JPL
695037	2015 UM_{99}	—	October 23, 2015	Mount Lemmon	Mount Lemmon Survey	EOS	1.5 km	MPC · JPL
695038	2015 UX_{99}	—	October 23, 2015	Kitt Peak	Spacewatch	·	2.3 km	MPC · JPL
695039	2015 UK_{100}	—	October 24, 2015	Mount Lemmon	Mount Lemmon Survey	EOS	1.6 km	MPC · JPL
695040	2015 UE_{101}	—	October 25, 2015	Haleakala	Pan-STARRS 1	·	2.3 km	MPC · JPL
695041	2015 UJ_{103}	—	October 16, 2015	Mount Lemmon	Mount Lemmon Survey	·	520 m	MPC · JPL
695042	2015 VG_{4}	—	May 28, 2014	Haleakala	Pan-STARRS 1	·	2.3 km	MPC · JPL
695043	2015 VJ_{4}	—	January 27, 2012	Mount Lemmon	Mount Lemmon Survey	·	2.7 km	MPC · JPL
695044	2015 VH_{5}	—	September 30, 2005	Mauna Kea	A. Boattini	·	2.5 km	MPC · JPL
695045	2015 VP_{5}	—	February 5, 2013	Kitt Peak	Spacewatch	·	1.3 km	MPC · JPL
695046	2015 VH_{6}	—	November 1, 2015	Mount Lemmon	Mount Lemmon Survey	URS	2.3 km	MPC · JPL
695047	2015 VT_{7}	—	December 2, 2005	Mount Lemmon	Mount Lemmon Survey	·	2.1 km	MPC · JPL
695048	2015 VW_{7}	—	October 10, 2015	Haleakala	Pan-STARRS 1	·	2.1 km	MPC · JPL
695049	2015 VY_{9}	—	October 1, 2015	Mount Lemmon	Mount Lemmon Survey	·	1.7 km	MPC · JPL
695050	2015 VA_{10}	—	February 16, 2012	Haleakala	Pan-STARRS 1	·	2.3 km	MPC · JPL
695051	2015 VY_{11}	—	October 2, 2015	Mount Lemmon	Mount Lemmon Survey	·	2.1 km	MPC · JPL
695052	2015 VR_{12}	—	October 2, 2015	Kitt Peak	Spacewatch	KOR	1.1 km	MPC · JPL
695053	2015 VK_{13}	—	July 1, 2014	Haleakala	Pan-STARRS 1	·	2.3 km	MPC · JPL
695054	2015 VF_{14}	—	February 28, 2012	Haleakala	Pan-STARRS 1	·	2.2 km	MPC · JPL
695055	2015 VM_{17}	—	September 12, 2015	Haleakala	Pan-STARRS 1	·	1.5 km	MPC · JPL
695056	2015 VQ_{17}	—	September 12, 2015	Haleakala	Pan-STARRS 1	KOR	1.1 km	MPC · JPL
695057	2015 VS_{17}	—	February 26, 2014	Haleakala	Pan-STARRS 1	·	560 m	MPC · JPL
695058	2015 VR_{18}	—	October 29, 2010	Mount Lemmon	Mount Lemmon Survey	EOS	1.5 km	MPC · JPL
695059	2015 VL_{21}	—	October 17, 2010	Mount Lemmon	Mount Lemmon Survey	·	2.2 km	MPC · JPL
695060	2015 VC_{23}	—	October 2, 2015	Mount Lemmon	Mount Lemmon Survey	·	2.0 km	MPC · JPL
695061	2015 VE_{24}	—	September 6, 2015	Haleakala	Pan-STARRS 1	·	930 m	MPC · JPL
695062	2015 VK_{26}	—	November 1, 2015	Haleakala	Pan-STARRS 1	·	700 m	MPC · JPL
695063	2015 VO_{27}	—	October 16, 2015	Kitt Peak	Spacewatch	·	2.0 km	MPC · JPL
695064	2015 VY_{27}	—	November 1, 2015	Haleakala	Pan-STARRS 1	TIR	2.5 km	MPC · JPL
695065	2015 VK_{28}	—	September 17, 2010	Mount Lemmon	Mount Lemmon Survey	·	1.6 km	MPC · JPL
695066	2015 VF_{29}	—	August 18, 2009	Kitt Peak	Spacewatch	·	2.3 km	MPC · JPL
695067	2015 VQ_{29}	—	November 1, 2015	Haleakala	Pan-STARRS 1	EOS	1.5 km	MPC · JPL
695068	2015 VR_{32}	—	November 1, 2015	Haleakala	Pan-STARRS 1	·	550 m	MPC · JPL
695069	2015 VJ_{33}	—	October 25, 2015	Haleakala	Pan-STARRS 1	·	2.0 km	MPC · JPL
695070	2015 VY_{36}	—	October 8, 2015	Mount Lemmon	Mount Lemmon Survey	·	1.9 km	MPC · JPL
695071	2015 VE_{38}	—	March 27, 2012	Kitt Peak	Spacewatch	·	1.8 km	MPC · JPL
695072	2015 VP_{39}	—	November 1, 2015	Haleakala	Pan-STARRS 1	·	2.2 km	MPC · JPL
695073	2015 VX_{39}	—	November 25, 2005	Kitt Peak	Spacewatch	·	1.5 km	MPC · JPL
695074	2015 VO_{42}	—	November 12, 2010	Mount Lemmon	Mount Lemmon Survey	·	1.4 km	MPC · JPL
695075	2015 VV_{42}	—	October 8, 2004	Kitt Peak	Spacewatch	EOS	1.9 km	MPC · JPL
695076	2015 VS_{45}	—	October 9, 2015	Mount Lemmon	Mount Lemmon Survey	·	1.6 km	MPC · JPL
695077	2015 VF_{46}	—	October 9, 2005	Kitt Peak	Spacewatch	EOS	1.4 km	MPC · JPL
695078	2015 VS_{46}	—	September 30, 2011	Mount Lemmon	Mount Lemmon Survey	MRX	1.1 km	MPC · JPL
695079	2015 VE_{51}	—	November 12, 2010	Kitt Peak	Spacewatch	·	2.1 km	MPC · JPL
695080	2015 VH_{51}	—	April 23, 2009	Kitt Peak	Spacewatch	·	1.6 km	MPC · JPL
695081	2015 VM_{51}	—	August 30, 2005	Junk Bond	D. Healy	KOR	1.1 km	MPC · JPL
695082	2015 VJ_{52}	—	September 10, 2015	Haleakala	Pan-STARRS 1	·	3.0 km	MPC · JPL
695083	2015 VN_{52}	—	September 10, 2015	Haleakala	Pan-STARRS 1	·	2.7 km	MPC · JPL
695084	2015 VS_{52}	—	November 2, 2015	Haleakala	Pan-STARRS 1	·	2.4 km	MPC · JPL
695085	2015 VP_{53}	—	September 12, 2015	Haleakala	Pan-STARRS 1	VER	1.9 km	MPC · JPL
695086	2015 VX_{54}	—	May 4, 2014	Mount Lemmon	Mount Lemmon Survey	·	1.4 km	MPC · JPL
695087	2015 VX_{55}	—	December 27, 2011	Mount Lemmon	Mount Lemmon Survey	·	1.5 km	MPC · JPL
695088	2015 VF_{56}	—	September 30, 2006	Mount Lemmon	Mount Lemmon Survey	·	1.8 km	MPC · JPL
695089	2015 VV_{56}	—	October 18, 1998	Kitt Peak	Spacewatch	·	2.7 km	MPC · JPL
695090	2015 VU_{57}	—	September 7, 2008	Mount Lemmon	Mount Lemmon Survey	·	580 m	MPC · JPL
695091	2015 VX_{59}	—	October 12, 2015	Haleakala	Pan-STARRS 1	LUT	3.2 km	MPC · JPL
695092	2015 VS_{61}	—	June 24, 2014	Haleakala	Pan-STARRS 1	·	2.3 km	MPC · JPL
695093	2015 VY_{61}	—	April 30, 2009	Kitt Peak	Spacewatch	AGN	1.1 km	MPC · JPL
695094	2015 VV_{66}	—	October 9, 2004	Kitt Peak	Spacewatch	·	2.7 km	MPC · JPL
695095	2015 VH_{67}	—	April 16, 2013	Haleakala	Pan-STARRS 1	·	2.5 km	MPC · JPL
695096	2015 VS_{67}	—	August 13, 2015	XuYi	PMO NEO Survey Program	LIX	3.1 km	MPC · JPL
695097	2015 VN_{69}	—	October 10, 2015	Haleakala	Pan-STARRS 1	·	1.9 km	MPC · JPL
695098	2015 VS_{70}	—	October 27, 2009	Mount Lemmon	Mount Lemmon Survey	THM	2.0 km	MPC · JPL
695099	2015 VJ_{71}	—	November 25, 2011	Haleakala	Pan-STARRS 1	·	1.6 km	MPC · JPL
695100	2015 VC_{72}	—	December 31, 2011	Mount Lemmon	Mount Lemmon Survey	·	1.6 km	MPC · JPL

== 695101–695200 ==
back to top

Designation			Discovery			Properties		Ref
Permanent	Provisional	Named after	Date	Site	Discoverer(s)	Category	Diam.	Ref
695101	2015 VG_{73}	—	October 9, 2012	Mount Lemmon	Mount Lemmon Survey	·	540 m	MPC · JPL
695102	2015 VG_{74}	—	September 28, 2002	Haleakala	NEAT	·	1.4 km	MPC · JPL
695103	2015 VA_{75}	—	July 31, 2005	Palomar	NEAT	BRA	1.8 km	MPC · JPL
695104	2015 VD_{76}	—	July 14, 2009	Kitt Peak	Spacewatch	·	2.1 km	MPC · JPL
695105	2015 VE_{76}	—	October 28, 2005	Mount Lemmon	Mount Lemmon Survey	TEL	1.1 km	MPC · JPL
695106	2015 VG_{76}	—	April 6, 2008	Kitt Peak	Spacewatch	·	2.4 km	MPC · JPL
695107	2015 VF_{77}	—	February 6, 1999	Mauna Kea	Anderson, J., Veillet, C.	·	660 m	MPC · JPL
695108	2015 VD_{78}	—	April 17, 2013	Haleakala	Pan-STARRS 1	·	2.7 km	MPC · JPL
695109	2015 VP_{78}	—	November 6, 2015	Mount Lemmon	Mount Lemmon Survey	EUP	3.6 km	MPC · JPL
695110	2015 VL_{79}	—	September 21, 2009	Mount Lemmon	Mount Lemmon Survey	·	2.5 km	MPC · JPL
695111	2015 VT_{79}	—	September 23, 2015	Haleakala	Pan-STARRS 1	·	2.6 km	MPC · JPL
695112	2015 VO_{81}	—	July 27, 2014	Haleakala	Pan-STARRS 1	·	2.1 km	MPC · JPL
695113	2015 VS_{81}	—	March 19, 2007	Mount Lemmon	Mount Lemmon Survey	·	2.6 km	MPC · JPL
695114	2015 VA_{82}	—	October 10, 2015	Haleakala	Pan-STARRS 1	·	1.7 km	MPC · JPL
695115	2015 VN_{82}	—	March 13, 2012	Mount Lemmon	Mount Lemmon Survey	VER	1.9 km	MPC · JPL
695116	2015 VW_{83}	—	October 18, 2015	Haleakala	Pan-STARRS 1	·	1.5 km	MPC · JPL
695117	2015 VF_{84}	—	September 18, 2009	Mount Lemmon	Mount Lemmon Survey	EOS	1.5 km	MPC · JPL
695118	2015 VQ_{84}	—	January 13, 2013	Mount Lemmon	Mount Lemmon Survey	·	640 m	MPC · JPL
695119	2015 VR_{84}	—	August 22, 2009	Tiki	Teamo, N.	·	2.3 km	MPC · JPL
695120	2015 VD_{88}	—	September 23, 2015	Haleakala	Pan-STARRS 1	·	2.1 km	MPC · JPL
695121	2015 VJ_{89}	—	December 4, 2005	Mount Lemmon	Mount Lemmon Survey	EOS	1.8 km	MPC · JPL
695122	2015 VY_{89}	—	April 7, 2002	Cerro Tololo	Deep Ecliptic Survey	EOS	1.6 km	MPC · JPL
695123	2015 VB_{92}	—	March 12, 2007	Mount Lemmon	Mount Lemmon Survey	·	590 m	MPC · JPL
695124	2015 VZ_{92}	—	October 15, 2004	Mount Lemmon	Mount Lemmon Survey	·	2.8 km	MPC · JPL
695125	2015 VL_{95}	—	December 24, 2005	Kitt Peak	Spacewatch	·	2.0 km	MPC · JPL
695126	2015 VQ_{96}	—	October 10, 2015	Haleakala	Pan-STARRS 1	T_{j} (2.98)	2.6 km	MPC · JPL
695127	2015 VZ_{96}	—	September 18, 1995	Kitt Peak	Spacewatch	·	1.5 km	MPC · JPL
695128	2015 VC_{98}	—	September 23, 2008	Mount Lemmon	Mount Lemmon Survey	·	630 m	MPC · JPL
695129	2015 VJ_{98}	—	December 23, 2012	Haleakala	Pan-STARRS 1	·	610 m	MPC · JPL
695130	2015 VK_{98}	—	August 7, 2004	Palomar	NEAT	·	1.8 km	MPC · JPL
695131	2015 VD_{99}	—	March 6, 2008	Mount Lemmon	Mount Lemmon Survey	AGN	1.1 km	MPC · JPL
695132	2015 VB_{100}	—	September 30, 2006	Mount Lemmon	Mount Lemmon Survey	·	1.6 km	MPC · JPL
695133	2015 VE_{100}	—	October 30, 2007	Kitt Peak	Spacewatch	(5)	1.1 km	MPC · JPL
695134	2015 VR_{100}	—	November 7, 2015	Mount Lemmon	Mount Lemmon Survey	EOS	1.6 km	MPC · JPL
695135	2015 VX_{100}	—	September 29, 2010	Mount Lemmon	Mount Lemmon Survey	·	1.8 km	MPC · JPL
695136	2015 VB_{101}	—	July 3, 2014	Haleakala	Pan-STARRS 1	AGN	1.2 km	MPC · JPL
695137	2015 VC_{103}	—	November 7, 2002	Kitt Peak	Deep Ecliptic Survey	·	520 m	MPC · JPL
695138	2015 VO_{103}	—	October 8, 2004	Kitt Peak	Spacewatch	·	2.5 km	MPC · JPL
695139	2015 VZ_{108}	—	January 13, 2011	Mount Lemmon	Mount Lemmon Survey	LIX	2.6 km	MPC · JPL
695140	2015 VA_{109}	—	November 30, 2010	Mount Lemmon	Mount Lemmon Survey	·	2.5 km	MPC · JPL
695141	2015 VE_{109}	—	September 9, 2015	Haleakala	Pan-STARRS 1	·	1.8 km	MPC · JPL
695142	2015 VS_{110}	—	August 22, 2004	Kitt Peak	Spacewatch	·	2.0 km	MPC · JPL
695143	2015 VO_{111}	—	October 7, 2008	Mount Lemmon	Mount Lemmon Survey	(2076)	690 m	MPC · JPL
695144	2015 VW_{111}	—	October 4, 2004	Kitt Peak	Spacewatch	·	2.7 km	MPC · JPL
695145	2015 VJ_{112}	—	August 22, 2014	Haleakala	Pan-STARRS 1	·	3.0 km	MPC · JPL
695146	2015 VT_{112}	—	April 11, 2008	Mount Lemmon	Mount Lemmon Survey	·	2.7 km	MPC · JPL
695147	2015 VE_{114}	—	April 9, 2013	Haleakala	Pan-STARRS 1	T_{j} (2.98)	2.7 km	MPC · JPL
695148	2015 VN_{115}	—	January 16, 2013	Mount Lemmon	Mount Lemmon Survey	·	640 m	MPC · JPL
695149	2015 VU_{115}	—	October 2, 2010	Kitt Peak	Spacewatch	·	1.7 km	MPC · JPL
695150	2015 VF_{116}	—	June 29, 2014	Haleakala	Pan-STARRS 1	·	2.5 km	MPC · JPL
695151	2015 VC_{118}	—	October 10, 2015	Haleakala	Pan-STARRS 1	·	2.0 km	MPC · JPL
695152	2015 VH_{118}	—	June 30, 2014	Haleakala	Pan-STARRS 1	·	2.3 km	MPC · JPL
695153	2015 VQ_{118}	—	September 9, 2015	Haleakala	Pan-STARRS 1	EUP	2.9 km	MPC · JPL
695154	2015 VT_{125}	—	November 8, 2010	Mount Lemmon	Mount Lemmon Survey	TIR	2.6 km	MPC · JPL
695155	2015 VY_{126}	—	November 7, 2015	Catalina	CSS	·	3.3 km	MPC · JPL
695156	2015 VH_{128}	—	February 28, 2012	Haleakala	Pan-STARRS 1	·	2.4 km	MPC · JPL
695157	2015 VN_{129}	—	September 5, 2008	Kitt Peak	Spacewatch	·	560 m	MPC · JPL
695158	2015 VW_{129}	—	September 19, 2009	Mount Lemmon	Mount Lemmon Survey	THM	1.7 km	MPC · JPL
695159	2015 VT_{130}	—	August 30, 2005	Kitt Peak	Spacewatch	·	580 m	MPC · JPL
695160	2015 VV_{130}	—	June 29, 2014	Haleakala	Pan-STARRS 1	·	1.5 km	MPC · JPL
695161	2015 VX_{130}	—	November 20, 2004	Kitt Peak	Spacewatch	·	2.9 km	MPC · JPL
695162	2015 VZ_{131}	—	March 1, 2008	Kitt Peak	Spacewatch	·	1.8 km	MPC · JPL
695163	2015 VN_{132}	—	September 8, 2015	Haleakala	Pan-STARRS 1	·	2.9 km	MPC · JPL
695164	2015 VV_{132}	—	December 8, 2005	Kitt Peak	Spacewatch	·	600 m	MPC · JPL
695165	2015 VU_{133}	—	November 9, 1999	Kitt Peak	Spacewatch	·	2.0 km	MPC · JPL
695166	2015 VY_{133}	—	November 10, 2004	Kitt Peak	Spacewatch	·	2.5 km	MPC · JPL
695167	2015 VV_{134}	—	May 6, 2008	Mount Lemmon	Mount Lemmon Survey	·	3.2 km	MPC · JPL
695168	2015 VG_{136}	—	July 8, 2014	Haleakala	Pan-STARRS 1	·	2.4 km	MPC · JPL
695169	2015 VE_{139}	—	January 10, 2013	Haleakala	Pan-STARRS 1	·	410 m	MPC · JPL
695170	2015 VX_{139}	—	February 10, 2008	Mount Lemmon	Mount Lemmon Survey	AGN	1.0 km	MPC · JPL
695171	2015 VF_{140}	—	October 12, 2010	Mount Lemmon	Mount Lemmon Survey	·	1.8 km	MPC · JPL
695172	2015 VT_{141}	—	May 7, 2014	Haleakala	Pan-STARRS 1	H	460 m	MPC · JPL
695173	2015 VN_{142}	—	April 19, 2012	Mount Lemmon	Mount Lemmon Survey	·	420 m	MPC · JPL
695174	2015 VS_{143}	—	January 3, 2011	Piszkés-tető	K. Sárneczky, Z. Kuli	T_{j} (2.98) · EUP	2.7 km	MPC · JPL
695175	2015 VZ_{143}	—	December 3, 2010	Mount Lemmon	Mount Lemmon Survey	·	2.6 km	MPC · JPL
695176	2015 VG_{144}	—	August 16, 2009	Kitt Peak	Spacewatch	·	2.0 km	MPC · JPL
695177	2015 VQ_{146}	—	July 25, 2014	Haleakala	Pan-STARRS 1	·	2.4 km	MPC · JPL
695178	2015 VX_{147}	—	December 4, 2010	Mount Lemmon	Mount Lemmon Survey	·	1.7 km	MPC · JPL
695179	2015 VA_{148}	—	October 10, 2015	Haleakala	Pan-STARRS 1	·	560 m	MPC · JPL
695180	2015 VF_{149}	—	November 3, 2015	Haleakala	Pan-STARRS 1	PHO	700 m	MPC · JPL
695181	2015 VV_{152}	—	December 14, 2010	Mount Lemmon	Mount Lemmon Survey	·	2.7 km	MPC · JPL
695182	2015 VW_{155}	—	November 1, 2006	Mount Lemmon	Mount Lemmon Survey	·	1.4 km	MPC · JPL
695183	2015 VN_{156}	—	August 28, 2014	Haleakala	Pan-STARRS 1	·	2.2 km	MPC · JPL
695184	2015 VB_{157}	—	November 2, 2010	Mount Lemmon	Mount Lemmon Survey	·	1.5 km	MPC · JPL
695185	2015 VP_{157}	—	November 15, 2015	Haleakala	Pan-STARRS 1	·	2.4 km	MPC · JPL
695186	2015 VT_{157}	—	September 28, 2000	Kitt Peak	Spacewatch	BRA	1.4 km	MPC · JPL
695187	2015 VY_{157}	—	March 14, 2007	Mount Lemmon	Mount Lemmon Survey	·	1.9 km	MPC · JPL
695188	2015 VW_{158}	—	December 1, 2010	Mount Lemmon	Mount Lemmon Survey	·	3.0 km	MPC · JPL
695189	2015 VB_{159}	—	June 27, 2014	Haleakala	Pan-STARRS 1	·	2.4 km	MPC · JPL
695190	2015 VK_{159}	—	July 6, 2014	Haleakala	Pan-STARRS 1	·	2.2 km	MPC · JPL
695191	2015 VD_{160}	—	September 9, 2015	Haleakala	Pan-STARRS 1	·	910 m	MPC · JPL
695192	2015 VP_{160}	—	February 9, 2008	Kitt Peak	Spacewatch	·	1.3 km	MPC · JPL
695193	2015 VW_{160}	—	May 8, 2013	Haleakala	Pan-STARRS 1	·	2.2 km	MPC · JPL
695194	2015 VY_{161}	—	November 8, 2015	Haleakala	Pan-STARRS 1	·	2.4 km	MPC · JPL
695195	2015 VZ_{161}	—	November 16, 2006	Mount Lemmon	Mount Lemmon Survey	AGN	950 m	MPC · JPL
695196	2015 VG_{162}	—	November 6, 2010	Mount Lemmon	Mount Lemmon Survey	·	2.6 km	MPC · JPL
695197	2015 VO_{162}	—	February 4, 2012	Haleakala	Pan-STARRS 1	·	1.5 km	MPC · JPL
695198	2015 VC_{189}	—	November 3, 2015	Haleakala	Pan-STARRS 1	·	3.0 km	MPC · JPL
695199	2015 VJ_{189}	—	November 8, 2015	Mount Lemmon	Mount Lemmon Survey	·	2.3 km	MPC · JPL
695200	2015 VL_{190}	—	November 14, 2015	Mount Lemmon	Mount Lemmon Survey	(31811)	2.1 km	MPC · JPL

== 695201–695300 ==
back to top

Designation			Discovery			Properties		Ref
Permanent	Provisional	Named after	Date	Site	Discoverer(s)	Category	Diam.	Ref
695201	2015 VP_{191}	—	November 7, 2015	Haleakala	Pan-STARRS 1	EOS	1.5 km	MPC · JPL
695202	2015 VT_{191}	—	November 1, 2015	Mount Lemmon	Mount Lemmon Survey	·	2.8 km	MPC · JPL
695203	2015 VD_{193}	—	November 3, 2015	Mount Lemmon	Mount Lemmon Survey	VER	1.9 km	MPC · JPL
695204	2015 VT_{193}	—	November 2, 2015	Mount Lemmon	Mount Lemmon Survey	·	2.8 km	MPC · JPL
695205	2015 VZ_{193}	—	November 7, 2015	Haleakala	Pan-STARRS 1	·	2.4 km	MPC · JPL
695206	2015 VF_{194}	—	November 6, 2015	Mount Lemmon	Mount Lemmon Survey	·	3.6 km	MPC · JPL
695207	2015 VD_{195}	—	November 2, 2015	Haleakala	Pan-STARRS 1	·	1.3 km	MPC · JPL
695208	2015 VE_{195}	—	November 1, 2015	Mount Lemmon	Mount Lemmon Survey	·	2.9 km	MPC · JPL
695209	2015 VY_{196}	—	November 3, 2015	Mount Lemmon	Mount Lemmon Survey	·	2.5 km	MPC · JPL
695210	2015 VO_{208}	—	November 13, 2015	Mount Lemmon	Mount Lemmon Survey	·	3.8 km	MPC · JPL
695211	2015 VG_{220}	—	November 3, 2015	Mount Lemmon	Mount Lemmon Survey	·	2.3 km	MPC · JPL
695212	2015 VJ_{220}	—	November 3, 2015	Mount Lemmon	Mount Lemmon Survey	·	2.4 km	MPC · JPL
695213	2015 WU	—	November 2, 2015	Haleakala	Pan-STARRS 1	·	2.3 km	MPC · JPL
695214	2015 WQ_{3}	—	May 2, 2014	Kitt Peak	Spacewatch	·	1.2 km	MPC · JPL
695215	2015 WB_{4}	—	November 18, 2015	Haleakala	Pan-STARRS 1	·	710 m	MPC · JPL
695216	2015 WM_{4}	—	November 7, 2015	Haleakala	Pan-STARRS 1	·	2.4 km	MPC · JPL
695217	2015 WV_{4}	—	May 28, 2008	Mount Lemmon	Mount Lemmon Survey	·	2.4 km	MPC · JPL
695218	2015 WU_{6}	—	October 29, 2010	Mount Lemmon	Mount Lemmon Survey	·	2.1 km	MPC · JPL
695219	2015 WE_{8}	—	September 28, 2006	Catalina	CSS	·	2.0 km	MPC · JPL
695220	2015 WA_{11}	—	August 27, 2005	Kitt Peak	Spacewatch	·	1.6 km	MPC · JPL
695221	2015 WG_{11}	—	August 30, 2005	Kitt Peak	Spacewatch	·	2.0 km	MPC · JPL
695222	2015 WH_{14}	—	September 6, 2008	Catalina	CSS	·	760 m	MPC · JPL
695223	2015 WG_{17}	—	November 18, 2015	Kitt Peak	Spacewatch	·	1.4 km	MPC · JPL
695224	2015 WO_{17}	—	October 21, 2006	Mount Lemmon	Mount Lemmon Survey	·	1.4 km	MPC · JPL
695225	2015 WT_{18}	—	November 17, 2015	Haleakala	Pan-STARRS 1	·	1.6 km	MPC · JPL
695226	2015 WB_{19}	—	November 18, 2009	Mount Lemmon	Mount Lemmon Survey	VER	2.8 km	MPC · JPL
695227	2015 WD_{19}	—	November 18, 2015	Haleakala	Pan-STARRS 1	·	1.9 km	MPC · JPL
695228	2015 WR_{19}	—	November 17, 2015	Haleakala	Pan-STARRS 1	·	1.9 km	MPC · JPL
695229	2015 WV_{19}	—	August 21, 2014	Oukaïmeden	C. Rinner	URS	2.4 km	MPC · JPL
695230	2015 WL_{20}	—	November 18, 2015	Haleakala	Pan-STARRS 1	·	2.4 km	MPC · JPL
695231	2015 WY_{20}	—	June 22, 2014	Haleakala	Pan-STARRS 1	·	2.3 km	MPC · JPL
695232	2015 WF_{21}	—	March 15, 2012	Kitt Peak	Spacewatch	·	2.7 km	MPC · JPL
695233	2015 WT_{21}	—	September 17, 2010	Mount Lemmon	Mount Lemmon Survey	AST	1.4 km	MPC · JPL
695234	2015 WL_{22}	—	February 25, 2007	Mount Lemmon	Mount Lemmon Survey	·	1.8 km	MPC · JPL
695235	2015 WP_{28}	—	November 21, 2015	Mount Lemmon	Mount Lemmon Survey	·	980 m	MPC · JPL
695236	2015 WX_{29}	—	November 21, 2015	Mount Lemmon	Mount Lemmon Survey	VER	2.0 km	MPC · JPL
695237	2015 WB_{30}	—	November 22, 2015	Mount Lemmon	Mount Lemmon Survey	·	2.2 km	MPC · JPL
695238	2015 WR_{30}	—	November 20, 2015	Mount Lemmon	Mount Lemmon Survey	·	2.0 km	MPC · JPL
695239	2015 WM_{31}	—	November 20, 2015	Mount Lemmon	Mount Lemmon Survey	·	2.5 km	MPC · JPL
695240	2015 WX_{31}	—	November 20, 2015	Mount Lemmon	Mount Lemmon Survey	·	3.1 km	MPC · JPL
695241	2015 XD	—	May 4, 2014	Catalina	CSS	H	510 m	MPC · JPL
695242	2015 XL	—	May 4, 2014	Haleakala	Pan-STARRS 1	·	1.0 km	MPC · JPL
695243	2015 XO_{2}	—	August 27, 2009	Kitt Peak	Spacewatch	HYG	2.4 km	MPC · JPL
695244	2015 XQ_{2}	—	January 20, 2009	Catalina	CSS	·	930 m	MPC · JPL
695245	2015 XL_{4}	—	February 10, 2013	Haleakala	Pan-STARRS 1	·	640 m	MPC · JPL
695246	2015 XS_{4}	—	September 17, 2009	Kitt Peak	Spacewatch	·	2.3 km	MPC · JPL
695247	2015 XE_{5}	—	July 4, 2014	Haleakala	Pan-STARRS 1	·	2.8 km	MPC · JPL
695248	2015 XC_{6}	—	February 25, 2006	Kitt Peak	Spacewatch	·	2.2 km	MPC · JPL
695249	2015 XZ_{6}	—	September 15, 2009	Kitt Peak	Spacewatch	·	2.7 km	MPC · JPL
695250	2015 XU_{7}	—	August 31, 2014	Mount Lemmon	Mount Lemmon Survey	·	2.4 km	MPC · JPL
695251	2015 XG_{8}	—	October 21, 2009	Mount Lemmon	Mount Lemmon Survey	VER	1.8 km	MPC · JPL
695252	2015 XO_{8}	—	January 30, 2011	Mount Lemmon	Mount Lemmon Survey	LIX	3.1 km	MPC · JPL
695253	2015 XE_{9}	—	March 15, 2013	Kitt Peak	Spacewatch	·	830 m	MPC · JPL
695254	2015 XQ_{9}	—	December 1, 2015	Haleakala	Pan-STARRS 1	·	1.6 km	MPC · JPL
695255	2015 XW_{9}	—	January 13, 2002	Kitt Peak	Spacewatch	·	850 m	MPC · JPL
695256	2015 XS_{10}	—	August 20, 2004	Kitt Peak	Spacewatch	·	670 m	MPC · JPL
695257	2015 XY_{10}	—	July 10, 2014	Haleakala	Pan-STARRS 1	·	2.8 km	MPC · JPL
695258	2015 XT_{11}	—	December 2, 2015	Haleakala	Pan-STARRS 1	·	2.6 km	MPC · JPL
695259	2015 XH_{12}	—	October 13, 2004	Anderson Mesa	LONEOS	·	3.0 km	MPC · JPL
695260	2015 XT_{13}	—	September 13, 2005	Kitt Peak	Spacewatch	KOR	1.1 km	MPC · JPL
695261	2015 XY_{15}	—	January 2, 2011	Mount Lemmon	Mount Lemmon Survey	·	2.2 km	MPC · JPL
695262	2015 XC_{16}	—	February 24, 2012	Kitt Peak	Spacewatch	HYG	2.3 km	MPC · JPL
695263	2015 XR_{16}	—	November 1, 2015	Kitt Peak	Spacewatch	·	2.3 km	MPC · JPL
695264	2015 XA_{17}	—	April 14, 2007	Kitt Peak	Spacewatch	·	2.5 km	MPC · JPL
695265	2015 XN_{17}	—	October 7, 2004	Kitt Peak	Spacewatch	EOS	1.4 km	MPC · JPL
695266	2015 XO_{17}	—	November 7, 2015	Haleakala	Pan-STARRS 1	VER	2.7 km	MPC · JPL
695267	2015 XY_{17}	—	November 1, 2015	Kitt Peak	Spacewatch	·	2.3 km	MPC · JPL
695268	2015 XF_{18}	—	September 9, 2015	Haleakala	Pan-STARRS 1	EOS	1.4 km	MPC · JPL
695269	2015 XE_{20}	—	October 10, 2015	Haleakala	Pan-STARRS 1	·	2.6 km	MPC · JPL
695270	2015 XX_{21}	—	April 25, 2007	Mount Lemmon	Mount Lemmon Survey	·	2.7 km	MPC · JPL
695271	2015 XL_{22}	—	December 1, 2010	Mount Lemmon	Mount Lemmon Survey	·	3.2 km	MPC · JPL
695272	2015 XY_{23}	—	December 2, 2015	Haleakala	Pan-STARRS 1	·	2.5 km	MPC · JPL
695273	2015 XB_{24}	—	October 25, 2005	Kitt Peak	Spacewatch	·	1.7 km	MPC · JPL
695274	2015 XS_{26}	—	November 11, 2001	Apache Point	SDSS Collaboration	·	650 m	MPC · JPL
695275	2015 XO_{27}	—	September 2, 2014	Haleakala	Pan-STARRS 1	·	2.3 km	MPC · JPL
695276	2015 XJ_{28}	—	November 20, 2007	Kitt Peak	Spacewatch	·	1.2 km	MPC · JPL
695277	2015 XC_{29}	—	November 7, 2015	Haleakala	Pan-STARRS 1	·	860 m	MPC · JPL
695278	2015 XA_{30}	—	January 2, 2011	Mount Lemmon	Mount Lemmon Survey	·	2.4 km	MPC · JPL
695279	2015 XQ_{30}	—	April 17, 2013	Haleakala	Pan-STARRS 1	·	2.2 km	MPC · JPL
695280	2015 XA_{31}	—	December 26, 2006	Kitt Peak	Spacewatch	·	1.5 km	MPC · JPL
695281	2015 XU_{31}	—	September 18, 2009	Kitt Peak	Spacewatch	·	2.3 km	MPC · JPL
695282	2015 XX_{31}	—	November 18, 2015	Haleakala	Pan-STARRS 1	·	750 m	MPC · JPL
695283	2015 XQ_{32}	—	October 9, 2010	Mount Lemmon	Mount Lemmon Survey	·	1.4 km	MPC · JPL
695284	2015 XT_{32}	—	March 15, 2012	Kitt Peak	Spacewatch	·	2.3 km	MPC · JPL
695285	2015 XU_{33}	—	April 14, 2008	Mount Lemmon	Mount Lemmon Survey	·	1.8 km	MPC · JPL
695286	2015 XX_{34}	—	November 18, 2015	Kitt Peak	Spacewatch	VER	2.2 km	MPC · JPL
695287	2015 XN_{35}	—	January 7, 2006	Kitt Peak	Spacewatch	·	2.0 km	MPC · JPL
695288	2015 XB_{36}	—	April 25, 2007	Kitt Peak	Spacewatch	·	550 m	MPC · JPL
695289	2015 XK_{37}	—	August 28, 2005	Anderson Mesa	LONEOS	·	730 m	MPC · JPL
695290	2015 XF_{38}	—	December 2, 2015	Haleakala	Pan-STARRS 1	·	440 m	MPC · JPL
695291	2015 XY_{38}	—	July 6, 2014	Haleakala	Pan-STARRS 1	·	2.8 km	MPC · JPL
695292	2015 XP_{39}	—	April 18, 2013	Mount Lemmon	Mount Lemmon Survey	·	2.8 km	MPC · JPL
695293	2015 XT_{40}	—	August 31, 2014	Haleakala	Pan-STARRS 1	VER	2.3 km	MPC · JPL
695294	2015 XU_{41}	—	November 22, 2015	Mount Lemmon	Mount Lemmon Survey	·	690 m	MPC · JPL
695295	2015 XY_{42}	—	December 2, 2015	Haleakala	Pan-STARRS 1	·	2.5 km	MPC · JPL
695296	2015 XD_{44}	—	April 9, 2008	Mount Lemmon	Mount Lemmon Survey	HOF	2.4 km	MPC · JPL
695297	2015 XG_{45}	—	May 22, 2003	Kitt Peak	Spacewatch	·	1.9 km	MPC · JPL
695298	2015 XZ_{46}	—	November 8, 2010	Mount Lemmon	Mount Lemmon Survey	·	1.8 km	MPC · JPL
695299	2015 XD_{50}	—	November 13, 2015	Kitt Peak	Spacewatch	·	2.2 km	MPC · JPL
695300	2015 XL_{50}	—	January 5, 2012	Haleakala	Pan-STARRS 1	·	2.7 km	MPC · JPL

== 695301–695400 ==
back to top

Designation			Discovery			Properties		Ref
Permanent	Provisional	Named after	Date	Site	Discoverer(s)	Category	Diam.	Ref
695301	2015 XQ_{50}	—	April 20, 2004	Kitt Peak	Spacewatch	·	2.0 km	MPC · JPL
695302	2015 XD_{51}	—	September 17, 2009	Catalina	CSS	·	2.7 km	MPC · JPL
695303	2015 XA_{52}	—	August 16, 2009	Catalina	CSS	·	2.3 km	MPC · JPL
695304	2015 XN_{53}	—	February 1, 2012	Kitt Peak	Spacewatch	GEF	1.1 km	MPC · JPL
695305	2015 XD_{56}	—	April 24, 2007	Mount Lemmon	Mount Lemmon Survey	·	2.1 km	MPC · JPL
695306	2015 XG_{56}	—	April 15, 2007	Kitt Peak	Spacewatch	·	2.4 km	MPC · JPL
695307	2015 XK_{58}	—	September 20, 2009	Kitt Peak	Spacewatch	·	2.1 km	MPC · JPL
695308	2015 XD_{59}	—	January 18, 2012	Kitt Peak	Spacewatch	·	2.1 km	MPC · JPL
695309	2015 XD_{60}	—	July 2, 2014	Mount Lemmon	Mount Lemmon Survey	·	2.2 km	MPC · JPL
695310	2015 XT_{60}	—	July 25, 2014	Haleakala	Pan-STARRS 1	·	2.4 km	MPC · JPL
695311	2015 XT_{61}	—	September 28, 2003	Kitt Peak	Spacewatch	·	2.5 km	MPC · JPL
695312	2015 XZ_{61}	—	April 17, 2013	Cerro Tololo	DECam	·	1.7 km	MPC · JPL
695313	2015 XH_{62}	—	January 18, 2006	Catalina	CSS	·	1.7 km	MPC · JPL
695314	2015 XE_{63}	—	December 1, 2015	Haleakala	Pan-STARRS 1	·	630 m	MPC · JPL
695315	2015 XO_{63}	—	May 7, 2014	Haleakala	Pan-STARRS 1	·	610 m	MPC · JPL
695316	2015 XQ_{63}	—	September 21, 2009	Kitt Peak	Spacewatch	·	2.3 km	MPC · JPL
695317	2015 XE_{65}	—	September 13, 2005	Kitt Peak	Spacewatch	·	1.6 km	MPC · JPL
695318	2015 XD_{66}	—	November 8, 2008	Mount Lemmon	Mount Lemmon Survey	PHO	770 m	MPC · JPL
695319	2015 XZ_{70}	—	December 4, 2010	Mount Lemmon	Mount Lemmon Survey	EOS	1.6 km	MPC · JPL
695320	2015 XC_{71}	—	July 17, 2004	Cerro Tololo	Deep Ecliptic Survey	·	1.7 km	MPC · JPL
695321	2015 XF_{72}	—	December 3, 2015	Haleakala	Pan-STARRS 1	·	2.6 km	MPC · JPL
695322	2015 XV_{73}	—	April 12, 1996	Kitt Peak	Spacewatch	LIX	3.8 km	MPC · JPL
695323	2015 XP_{74}	—	December 1, 2015	Haleakala	Pan-STARRS 1	BRA	1.5 km	MPC · JPL
695324	2015 XF_{76}	—	November 22, 2008	Kitt Peak	Spacewatch	·	710 m	MPC · JPL
695325	2015 XK_{76}	—	March 24, 2012	Mount Lemmon	Mount Lemmon Survey	·	2.3 km	MPC · JPL
695326	2015 XQ_{76}	—	October 8, 2015	Haleakala	Pan-STARRS 1	·	2.6 km	MPC · JPL
695327	2015 XT_{76}	—	February 4, 2006	Kitt Peak	Spacewatch	·	520 m	MPC · JPL
695328	2015 XC_{77}	—	August 28, 2014	Haleakala	Pan-STARRS 1	·	2.3 km	MPC · JPL
695329	2015 XN_{77}	—	June 8, 2013	Mount Lemmon	Mount Lemmon Survey	·	2.4 km	MPC · JPL
695330	2015 XH_{80}	—	January 28, 2011	Mount Lemmon	Mount Lemmon Survey	URS	3.1 km	MPC · JPL
695331	2015 XP_{80}	—	October 27, 2008	Mount Lemmon	Mount Lemmon Survey	·	690 m	MPC · JPL
695332	2015 XP_{83}	—	March 17, 2012	Mount Lemmon	Mount Lemmon Survey	·	1.6 km	MPC · JPL
695333	2015 XG_{85}	—	March 14, 2007	Mount Lemmon	Mount Lemmon Survey	EOS	1.8 km	MPC · JPL
695334	2015 XY_{85}	—	September 22, 2014	Haleakala	Pan-STARRS 1	·	2.3 km	MPC · JPL
695335	2015 XC_{87}	—	April 15, 2012	Haleakala	Pan-STARRS 1	EOS	1.6 km	MPC · JPL
695336	2015 XR_{88}	—	January 8, 2006	Kitt Peak	Spacewatch	·	3.0 km	MPC · JPL
695337	2015 XS_{89}	—	November 18, 2015	Haleakala	Pan-STARRS 1	T_{j} (2.98)	2.8 km	MPC · JPL
695338	2015 XZ_{89}	—	December 4, 2015	Haleakala	Pan-STARRS 1	·	2.4 km	MPC · JPL
695339	2015 XH_{90}	—	June 18, 2014	Mount Lemmon	Mount Lemmon Survey	·	1.8 km	MPC · JPL
695340	2015 XJ_{90}	—	December 4, 2015	Haleakala	Pan-STARRS 1	·	650 m	MPC · JPL
695341	2015 XR_{94}	—	January 14, 2011	Mount Lemmon	Mount Lemmon Survey	·	2.2 km	MPC · JPL
695342	2015 XC_{97}	—	December 4, 2015	Haleakala	Pan-STARRS 1	·	2.1 km	MPC · JPL
695343	2015 XL_{97}	—	September 30, 2006	Mount Lemmon	Mount Lemmon Survey	·	1.4 km	MPC · JPL
695344	2015 XX_{97}	—	May 8, 2013	Haleakala	Pan-STARRS 1	·	2.0 km	MPC · JPL
695345	2015 XG_{99}	—	June 5, 2014	Haleakala	Pan-STARRS 1	·	660 m	MPC · JPL
695346	2015 XH_{99}	—	January 14, 2011	Mount Lemmon	Mount Lemmon Survey	·	2.3 km	MPC · JPL
695347	2015 XF_{101}	—	September 4, 2011	Haleakala	Pan-STARRS 1	·	530 m	MPC · JPL
695348	2015 XA_{103}	—	December 4, 2015	Haleakala	Pan-STARRS 1	·	600 m	MPC · JPL
695349	2015 XB_{104}	—	August 28, 2014	Haleakala	Pan-STARRS 1	·	2.2 km	MPC · JPL
695350	2015 XH_{104}	—	December 4, 2015	Haleakala	Pan-STARRS 1	·	750 m	MPC · JPL
695351	2015 XA_{105}	—	January 29, 2011	Mount Lemmon	Mount Lemmon Survey	·	2.3 km	MPC · JPL
695352	2015 XU_{105}	—	September 19, 1998	Apache Point	SDSS	·	1.5 km	MPC · JPL
695353	2015 XQ_{108}	—	December 4, 2015	Haleakala	Pan-STARRS 1	·	2.3 km	MPC · JPL
695354	2015 XR_{113}	—	November 13, 2015	Mount Lemmon	Mount Lemmon Survey	·	2.6 km	MPC · JPL
695355	2015 XE_{116}	—	October 14, 2009	Mount Lemmon	Mount Lemmon Survey	EOS	1.4 km	MPC · JPL
695356	2015 XN_{117}	—	December 4, 2015	Haleakala	Pan-STARRS 1	·	2.2 km	MPC · JPL
695357	2015 XL_{120}	—	August 26, 2003	Cerro Tololo	Deep Ecliptic Survey	·	2.6 km	MPC · JPL
695358	2015 XQ_{121}	—	February 5, 2006	Mount Lemmon	Mount Lemmon Survey	·	2.5 km	MPC · JPL
695359	2015 XL_{125}	—	June 3, 2014	Haleakala	Pan-STARRS 1	·	2.4 km	MPC · JPL
695360	2015 XH_{126}	—	March 5, 2011	Mount Lemmon	Mount Lemmon Survey	·	2.8 km	MPC · JPL
695361	2015 XM_{127}	—	January 30, 2006	Kitt Peak	Spacewatch	·	600 m	MPC · JPL
695362	2015 XD_{134}	—	December 4, 2015	Mount Lemmon	Mount Lemmon Survey	·	580 m	MPC · JPL
695363	2015 XS_{134}	—	May 16, 2013	Haleakala	Pan-STARRS 1	·	2.8 km	MPC · JPL
695364	2015 XD_{135}	—	October 18, 2004	Kitt Peak	Deep Ecliptic Survey	·	1.8 km	MPC · JPL
695365	2015 XR_{135}	—	September 11, 2010	Mount Lemmon	Mount Lemmon Survey	KOR	1.2 km	MPC · JPL
695366	2015 XQ_{137}	—	November 9, 2015	Mount Lemmon	Mount Lemmon Survey	·	2.0 km	MPC · JPL
695367	2015 XM_{139}	—	June 30, 2014	Haleakala	Pan-STARRS 1	·	2.3 km	MPC · JPL
695368	2015 XO_{139}	—	October 26, 2009	Mount Lemmon	Mount Lemmon Survey	·	3.0 km	MPC · JPL
695369	2015 XU_{141}	—	September 19, 2015	Haleakala	Pan-STARRS 1	VER	2.3 km	MPC · JPL
695370	2015 XA_{143}	—	July 1, 2014	Haleakala	Pan-STARRS 1	·	1.3 km	MPC · JPL
695371	2015 XD_{143}	—	April 10, 2013	Haleakala	Pan-STARRS 1	·	1.3 km	MPC · JPL
695372	2015 XO_{143}	—	December 3, 2004	Kitt Peak	Spacewatch	·	840 m	MPC · JPL
695373	2015 XZ_{143}	—	November 22, 2015	Catalina	CSS	VER	2.3 km	MPC · JPL
695374	2015 XN_{144}	—	October 14, 2009	Kitt Peak	Spacewatch	·	2.4 km	MPC · JPL
695375	2015 XT_{145}	—	October 6, 2004	Kitt Peak	Spacewatch	·	830 m	MPC · JPL
695376	2015 XG_{148}	—	November 10, 2015	Mount Lemmon	Mount Lemmon Survey	MAS	560 m	MPC · JPL
695377	2015 XN_{150}	—	September 19, 2003	Kitt Peak	Spacewatch	·	2.5 km	MPC · JPL
695378	2015 XE_{154}	—	December 4, 2005	Kitt Peak	Spacewatch	·	3.9 km	MPC · JPL
695379	2015 XY_{154}	—	March 9, 2007	Mount Lemmon	Mount Lemmon Survey	·	2.9 km	MPC · JPL
695380	2015 XD_{156}	—	February 27, 2012	Kitt Peak	Spacewatch	·	3.0 km	MPC · JPL
695381	2015 XO_{159}	—	December 5, 2015	Haleakala	Pan-STARRS 1	·	640 m	MPC · JPL
695382	2015 XJ_{163}	—	November 12, 2010	Mount Lemmon	Mount Lemmon Survey	·	2.5 km	MPC · JPL
695383	2015 XT_{163}	—	June 29, 2014	Haleakala	Pan-STARRS 1	·	2.6 km	MPC · JPL
695384	2015 XP_{166}	—	February 22, 2009	Kitt Peak	Spacewatch	·	900 m	MPC · JPL
695385	2015 XK_{167}	—	August 28, 2014	Haleakala	Pan-STARRS 1	·	3.2 km	MPC · JPL
695386	2015 XV_{172}	—	September 23, 2015	Haleakala	Pan-STARRS 1	·	2.0 km	MPC · JPL
695387	2015 XA_{173}	—	August 21, 2015	Haleakala	Pan-STARRS 1	·	2.4 km	MPC · JPL
695388	2015 XF_{174}	—	January 13, 2011	Mount Lemmon	Mount Lemmon Survey	·	2.4 km	MPC · JPL
695389	2015 XH_{177}	—	November 19, 2015	Kitt Peak	Spacewatch	·	1.0 km	MPC · JPL
695390	2015 XF_{178}	—	April 15, 2004	Palomar	NEAT	·	2.1 km	MPC · JPL
695391	2015 XW_{181}	—	February 8, 2013	Haleakala	Pan-STARRS 1	V	490 m	MPC · JPL
695392	2015 XG_{182}	—	February 27, 2012	Haleakala	Pan-STARRS 1	VER	2.0 km	MPC · JPL
695393	2015 XG_{185}	—	May 8, 2008	Kitt Peak	Spacewatch	·	1.9 km	MPC · JPL
695394	2015 XY_{190}	—	December 27, 2005	Kitt Peak	Spacewatch	·	1.8 km	MPC · JPL
695395	2015 XD_{192}	—	April 13, 2013	Haleakala	Pan-STARRS 1	AGN	1.0 km	MPC · JPL
695396	2015 XL_{192}	—	November 1, 2015	Haleakala	Pan-STARRS 1	·	2.6 km	MPC · JPL
695397	2015 XM_{192}	—	August 3, 2014	Haleakala	Pan-STARRS 1	V	450 m	MPC · JPL
695398	2015 XU_{195}	—	November 16, 2006	Kitt Peak	Spacewatch	·	1.5 km	MPC · JPL
695399	2015 XD_{197}	—	January 13, 2011	Mount Lemmon	Mount Lemmon Survey	·	2.4 km	MPC · JPL
695400	2015 XW_{197}	—	December 18, 2001	Kitt Peak	Spacewatch	·	600 m	MPC · JPL

== 695401–695500 ==
back to top

Designation			Discovery			Properties		Ref
Permanent	Provisional	Named after	Date	Site	Discoverer(s)	Category	Diam.	Ref
695401	2015 XN_{201}	—	January 20, 2013	Mount Lemmon	Mount Lemmon Survey	·	530 m	MPC · JPL
695402	2015 XQ_{204}	—	November 1, 2005	Kitt Peak	Spacewatch	KOR	1.2 km	MPC · JPL
695403	2015 XJ_{208}	—	September 23, 2015	Haleakala	Pan-STARRS 1	·	3.0 km	MPC · JPL
695404	2015 XZ_{209}	—	February 9, 2011	Mount Lemmon	Mount Lemmon Survey	THM	1.6 km	MPC · JPL
695405	2015 XE_{210}	—	December 3, 2015	Mount Lemmon	Mount Lemmon Survey	·	590 m	MPC · JPL
695406	2015 XV_{211}	—	October 21, 2006	Mount Lemmon	Mount Lemmon Survey	·	1.5 km	MPC · JPL
695407	2015 XF_{212}	—	March 24, 2012	Mount Lemmon	Mount Lemmon Survey	·	2.3 km	MPC · JPL
695408	2015 XD_{215}	—	October 14, 2010	Mount Lemmon	Mount Lemmon Survey	AST	1.4 km	MPC · JPL
695409	2015 XS_{217}	—	August 22, 2004	Kitt Peak	Spacewatch	·	1.6 km	MPC · JPL
695410	2015 XK_{219}	—	October 16, 2009	Mount Lemmon	Mount Lemmon Survey	·	2.2 km	MPC · JPL
695411	2015 XM_{219}	—	July 2, 2014	Haleakala	Pan-STARRS 1	·	2.0 km	MPC · JPL
695412	2015 XU_{220}	—	August 23, 2014	Haleakala	Pan-STARRS 1	·	2.2 km	MPC · JPL
695413	2015 XT_{222}	—	October 26, 2009	Mount Lemmon	Mount Lemmon Survey	·	2.6 km	MPC · JPL
695414	2015 XO_{225}	—	December 6, 2015	Haleakala	Pan-STARRS 1	·	1.5 km	MPC · JPL
695415	2015 XF_{229}	—	December 6, 2015	Haleakala	Pan-STARRS 1	·	570 m	MPC · JPL
695416	2015 XJ_{237}	—	May 21, 2014	Haleakala	Pan-STARRS 1	·	490 m	MPC · JPL
695417	2015 XW_{239}	—	October 26, 2009	Mount Lemmon	Mount Lemmon Survey	·	2.1 km	MPC · JPL
695418	2015 XL_{241}	—	March 31, 2008	Kitt Peak	Spacewatch	AGN	1.0 km	MPC · JPL
695419	2015 XX_{242}	—	July 25, 2014	Haleakala	Pan-STARRS 1	·	1.4 km	MPC · JPL
695420	2015 XQ_{246}	—	January 6, 2006	Mount Lemmon	Mount Lemmon Survey	EOS	1.7 km	MPC · JPL
695421	2015 XW_{247}	—	June 29, 2014	Haleakala	Pan-STARRS 1	·	3.4 km	MPC · JPL
695422	2015 XL_{252}	—	December 7, 2015	Haleakala	Pan-STARRS 1	·	2.4 km	MPC · JPL
695423	2015 XS_{252}	—	May 31, 2014	Haleakala	Pan-STARRS 1	·	2.3 km	MPC · JPL
695424	2015 XR_{253}	—	August 23, 2014	Haleakala	Pan-STARRS 1	·	2.6 km	MPC · JPL
695425	2015 XF_{258}	—	September 26, 2011	Haleakala	Pan-STARRS 1	MAS	560 m	MPC · JPL
695426	2015 XC_{259}	—	November 16, 2006	Kitt Peak	Spacewatch	AGN	1.0 km	MPC · JPL
695427	2015 XP_{262}	—	February 22, 2006	Mount Lemmon	Mount Lemmon Survey	·	720 m	MPC · JPL
695428	2015 XD_{264}	—	November 19, 2006	Kitt Peak	Spacewatch	·	1.3 km	MPC · JPL
695429	2015 XQ_{268}	—	June 4, 2014	Haleakala	Pan-STARRS 1	·	570 m	MPC · JPL
695430	2015 XN_{269}	—	January 20, 2009	Mount Lemmon	Mount Lemmon Survey	·	780 m	MPC · JPL
695431	2015 XV_{270}	—	December 6, 2015	Haleakala	Pan-STARRS 1	·	920 m	MPC · JPL
695432	2015 XK_{271}	—	August 20, 2014	Haleakala	Pan-STARRS 1	·	2.0 km	MPC · JPL
695433	2015 XP_{275}	—	July 28, 2014	Haleakala	Pan-STARRS 1	NYS	860 m	MPC · JPL
695434	2015 XZ_{276}	—	December 3, 2015	Mount Lemmon	Mount Lemmon Survey	·	900 m	MPC · JPL
695435	2015 XY_{278}	—	December 7, 2015	Haleakala	Pan-STARRS 1	·	850 m	MPC · JPL
695436	2015 XZ_{280}	—	December 4, 2015	Mount Lemmon	Mount Lemmon Survey	·	480 m	MPC · JPL
695437	2015 XZ_{281}	—	December 7, 2015	Haleakala	Pan-STARRS 1	·	2.1 km	MPC · JPL
695438	2015 XQ_{283}	—	June 7, 2013	Haleakala	Pan-STARRS 1	·	2.7 km	MPC · JPL
695439	2015 XW_{283}	—	March 25, 2007	Mount Lemmon	Mount Lemmon Survey	·	2.3 km	MPC · JPL
695440	2015 XS_{284}	—	June 25, 2014	Kitt Peak	Spacewatch	·	2.6 km	MPC · JPL
695441	2015 XN_{290}	—	May 12, 2013	Haleakala	Pan-STARRS 1	·	2.3 km	MPC · JPL
695442	2015 XH_{291}	—	October 14, 2010	Mount Lemmon	Mount Lemmon Survey	·	1.2 km	MPC · JPL
695443	2015 XD_{293}	—	August 20, 2014	Haleakala	Pan-STARRS 1	·	890 m	MPC · JPL
695444	2015 XT_{295}	—	September 20, 2003	Kitt Peak	Spacewatch	·	2.4 km	MPC · JPL
695445	2015 XK_{298}	—	August 27, 2014	Haleakala	Pan-STARRS 1	HYG	2.3 km	MPC · JPL
695446	2015 XU_{299}	—	February 19, 2013	Kitt Peak	Spacewatch	MAS	540 m	MPC · JPL
695447	2015 XK_{304}	—	October 25, 2009	Kitt Peak	Spacewatch	·	2.2 km	MPC · JPL
695448	2015 XX_{304}	—	September 20, 2011	Haleakala	Pan-STARRS 1	·	700 m	MPC · JPL
695449	2015 XO_{305}	—	December 22, 2008	Kitt Peak	Spacewatch	·	630 m	MPC · JPL
695450	2015 XP_{305}	—	November 22, 2015	Mount Lemmon	Mount Lemmon Survey	·	3.1 km	MPC · JPL
695451	2015 XF_{308}	—	December 7, 2015	Haleakala	Pan-STARRS 1	·	950 m	MPC · JPL
695452	2015 XZ_{309}	—	November 20, 2004	Kitt Peak	Spacewatch	·	2.4 km	MPC · JPL
695453	2015 XH_{311}	—	February 28, 2006	Mount Lemmon	Mount Lemmon Survey	·	1.9 km	MPC · JPL
695454	2015 XV_{311}	—	December 8, 2015	Mount Lemmon	Mount Lemmon Survey	·	1.8 km	MPC · JPL
695455	2015 XP_{312}	—	January 1, 2009	Mount Lemmon	Mount Lemmon Survey	·	640 m	MPC · JPL
695456	2015 XT_{313}	—	June 4, 2013	Mount Lemmon	Mount Lemmon Survey	·	2.3 km	MPC · JPL
695457	2015 XG_{314}	—	October 14, 2010	Mount Lemmon	Mount Lemmon Survey	·	1.4 km	MPC · JPL
695458	2015 XF_{318}	—	December 6, 2015	Mount Lemmon	Mount Lemmon Survey	V	500 m	MPC · JPL
695459	2015 XO_{320}	—	December 8, 2015	Mount Lemmon	Mount Lemmon Survey	·	670 m	MPC · JPL
695460	2015 XL_{321}	—	August 23, 2014	Haleakala	Pan-STARRS 1	·	2.5 km	MPC · JPL
695461	2015 XS_{321}	—	July 9, 2013	Haleakala	Pan-STARRS 1	·	3.5 km	MPC · JPL
695462	2015 XL_{322}	—	November 1, 2005	Kitt Peak	Spacewatch	KOR	1.1 km	MPC · JPL
695463	2015 XC_{328}	—	December 8, 2015	Haleakala	Pan-STARRS 1	·	700 m	MPC · JPL
695464	2015 XT_{329}	—	October 16, 2003	Kitt Peak	Spacewatch	·	2.8 km	MPC · JPL
695465	2015 XW_{331}	—	December 8, 2015	Haleakala	Pan-STARRS 1	·	2.1 km	MPC · JPL
695466	2015 XZ_{333}	—	December 8, 2015	Haleakala	Pan-STARRS 1	·	2.9 km	MPC · JPL
695467	2015 XH_{335}	—	December 8, 2015	Haleakala	Pan-STARRS 1	·	2.9 km	MPC · JPL
695468	2015 XX_{335}	—	August 22, 2014	Haleakala	Pan-STARRS 1	·	2.6 km	MPC · JPL
695469	2015 XO_{336}	—	December 21, 2008	Kitt Peak	Spacewatch	·	770 m	MPC · JPL
695470	2015 XR_{336}	—	December 8, 2015	Haleakala	Pan-STARRS 1	·	3.1 km	MPC · JPL
695471	2015 XA_{337}	—	November 17, 2009	Kitt Peak	Spacewatch	VER	2.5 km	MPC · JPL
695472	2015 XC_{337}	—	May 29, 2008	Mount Lemmon	Mount Lemmon Survey	THB	2.9 km	MPC · JPL
695473	2015 XU_{339}	—	October 22, 2003	Kitt Peak	Spacewatch	THM	2.3 km	MPC · JPL
695474	2015 XR_{340}	—	October 19, 2006	Kitt Peak	Spacewatch	·	1.2 km	MPC · JPL
695475	2015 XW_{340}	—	October 22, 2003	Apache Point	SDSS	VER	2.6 km	MPC · JPL
695476	2015 XZ_{340}	—	October 1, 2003	Kitt Peak	Spacewatch	VER	1.8 km	MPC · JPL
695477	2015 XE_{342}	—	October 23, 2011	Mount Lemmon	Mount Lemmon Survey	·	690 m	MPC · JPL
695478	2015 XR_{342}	—	December 8, 2015	Haleakala	Pan-STARRS 1	·	1.5 km	MPC · JPL
695479	2015 XB_{344}	—	October 17, 2010	Mount Lemmon	Mount Lemmon Survey	·	1.9 km	MPC · JPL
695480	2015 XK_{345}	—	December 8, 2015	Haleakala	Pan-STARRS 1	·	980 m	MPC · JPL
695481	2015 XQ_{345}	—	May 20, 2014	Haleakala	Pan-STARRS 1	MAS	500 m	MPC · JPL
695482	2015 XR_{346}	—	January 29, 2011	Mount Lemmon	Mount Lemmon Survey	·	2.5 km	MPC · JPL
695483	2015 XV_{346}	—	February 26, 2012	Kitt Peak	Spacewatch	·	2.7 km	MPC · JPL
695484	2015 XB_{347}	—	November 17, 2009	Mount Lemmon	Mount Lemmon Survey	THM	1.8 km	MPC · JPL
695485	2015 XF_{347}	—	August 3, 2014	Haleakala	Pan-STARRS 1	·	2.7 km	MPC · JPL
695486	2015 XU_{348}	—	September 14, 2014	Catalina	CSS	·	2.6 km	MPC · JPL
695487	2015 XX_{349}	—	August 30, 2014	Mount Lemmon	Mount Lemmon Survey	VER	2.8 km	MPC · JPL
695488	2015 XK_{350}	—	September 18, 2009	Mount Lemmon	Mount Lemmon Survey	THM	1.9 km	MPC · JPL
695489	2015 XD_{351}	—	December 4, 2010	Mount Lemmon	Mount Lemmon Survey	H	390 m	MPC · JPL
695490	2015 XP_{354}	—	April 29, 2008	Mount Lemmon	Mount Lemmon Survey	·	2.3 km	MPC · JPL
695491	2015 XK_{356}	—	June 6, 2011	Mount Lemmon	Mount Lemmon Survey	·	520 m	MPC · JPL
695492	2015 XA_{357}	—	October 16, 2009	Mount Lemmon	Mount Lemmon Survey	·	2.2 km	MPC · JPL
695493	2015 XK_{357}	—	August 12, 2004	Cerro Tololo	Deep Ecliptic Survey	·	1.4 km	MPC · JPL
695494	2015 XR_{359}	—	May 7, 2014	Haleakala	Pan-STARRS 1	·	1.9 km	MPC · JPL
695495	2015 XS_{359}	—	August 20, 2014	Haleakala	Pan-STARRS 1	·	2.3 km	MPC · JPL
695496	2015 XD_{361}	—	July 28, 2014	Haleakala	Pan-STARRS 1	EOS	1.3 km	MPC · JPL
695497	2015 XH_{361}	—	October 9, 2010	Mount Lemmon	Mount Lemmon Survey	ELF	3.3 km	MPC · JPL
695498	2015 XX_{361}	—	December 12, 2015	Haleakala	Pan-STARRS 1	·	740 m	MPC · JPL
695499	2015 XE_{362}	—	December 12, 2015	Haleakala	Pan-STARRS 1	·	2.3 km	MPC · JPL
695500	2015 XO_{362}	—	December 16, 2007	Mount Lemmon	Mount Lemmon Survey	(5)	1.2 km	MPC · JPL

== 695501–695600 ==
back to top

Designation			Discovery			Properties		Ref
Permanent	Provisional	Named after	Date	Site	Discoverer(s)	Category	Diam.	Ref
695501	2015 XS_{362}	—	January 12, 2011	Mount Lemmon	Mount Lemmon Survey	·	2.6 km	MPC · JPL
695502	2015 XO_{364}	—	December 9, 2015	Mount Lemmon	Mount Lemmon Survey	V	670 m	MPC · JPL
695503	2015 XW_{364}	—	September 2, 2014	Haleakala	Pan-STARRS 1	EOS	1.9 km	MPC · JPL
695504	2015 XQ_{366}	—	December 9, 2015	Mount Lemmon	Mount Lemmon Survey	NYS	820 m	MPC · JPL
695505	2015 XY_{366}	—	December 12, 2015	Haleakala	Pan-STARRS 1	PHO	810 m	MPC · JPL
695506	2015 XS_{367}	—	October 17, 1995	Kitt Peak	Spacewatch	KOR	1.2 km	MPC · JPL
695507	2015 XB_{368}	—	October 9, 2004	Kitt Peak	Spacewatch	·	860 m	MPC · JPL
695508	2015 XC_{369}	—	August 13, 2015	Kitt Peak	Spacewatch	·	780 m	MPC · JPL
695509	2015 XE_{369}	—	October 6, 2008	Catalina	CSS	·	570 m	MPC · JPL
695510	2015 XP_{369}	—	January 30, 2006	Kitt Peak	Spacewatch	·	2.4 km	MPC · JPL
695511	2015 XB_{373}	—	December 8, 2015	Mount Lemmon	Mount Lemmon Survey	·	1.3 km	MPC · JPL
695512	2015 XM_{373}	—	December 8, 2015	Mount Lemmon	Mount Lemmon Survey	·	730 m	MPC · JPL
695513	2015 XC_{376}	—	December 8, 2015	Mount Lemmon	Mount Lemmon Survey	·	2.4 km	MPC · JPL
695514	2015 XD_{376}	—	January 12, 2011	Kitt Peak	Spacewatch	·	2.6 km	MPC · JPL
695515	2015 XF_{376}	—	December 12, 2015	Haleakala	Pan-STARRS 1	V	430 m	MPC · JPL
695516	2015 XZ_{376}	—	December 9, 2015	Haleakala	Pan-STARRS 1	·	3.9 km	MPC · JPL
695517	2015 XM_{379}	—	October 24, 2011	Mount Lemmon	Mount Lemmon Survey	MAS	550 m	MPC · JPL
695518	2015 XO_{381}	—	December 6, 2015	Haleakala	Pan-STARRS 1	·	3.0 km	MPC · JPL
695519	2015 XL_{383}	—	October 31, 2010	ESA OGS	ESA OGS	·	1.4 km	MPC · JPL
695520	2015 XW_{385}	—	December 12, 2015	Haleakala	Pan-STARRS 1	H	330 m	MPC · JPL
695521	2015 XP_{386}	—	December 14, 2010	Mount Lemmon	Mount Lemmon Survey	H	400 m	MPC · JPL
695522	2015 XP_{395}	—	March 27, 2011	Mount Lemmon	Mount Lemmon Survey	·	2.7 km	MPC · JPL
695523	2015 XD_{397}	—	January 21, 2009	Bergisch Gladbach	W. Bickel	V	500 m	MPC · JPL
695524	2015 XO_{397}	—	November 2, 2008	Kitt Peak	Spacewatch	·	2.6 km	MPC · JPL
695525	2015 XC_{398}	—	February 24, 2012	Mount Lemmon	Mount Lemmon Survey	·	1.5 km	MPC · JPL
695526	2015 XF_{399}	—	November 24, 2008	Mount Lemmon	Mount Lemmon Survey	·	830 m	MPC · JPL
695527	2015 XQ_{399}	—	November 1, 2008	Mount Lemmon	Mount Lemmon Survey	HYG	2.5 km	MPC · JPL
695528	2015 XT_{399}	—	September 15, 2013	Mount Lemmon	Mount Lemmon Survey	EOS	1.7 km	MPC · JPL
695529	2015 XH_{400}	—	February 27, 2012	Haleakala	Pan-STARRS 1	TEL	990 m	MPC · JPL
695530	2015 XJ_{400}	—	September 27, 2009	Mount Lemmon	Mount Lemmon Survey	·	2.5 km	MPC · JPL
695531	2015 XL_{400}	—	August 23, 2014	Haleakala	Pan-STARRS 1	·	1.6 km	MPC · JPL
695532	2015 XM_{400}	—	December 3, 2015	Mount Lemmon	Mount Lemmon Survey	·	860 m	MPC · JPL
695533	2015 XH_{401}	—	August 19, 2014	Haleakala	Pan-STARRS 1	·	3.5 km	MPC · JPL
695534	2015 XM_{401}	—	December 7, 2015	Haleakala	Pan-STARRS 1	·	1.3 km	MPC · JPL
695535	2015 XB_{402}	—	October 26, 2009	Mount Lemmon	Mount Lemmon Survey	·	2.8 km	MPC · JPL
695536	2015 XR_{402}	—	October 8, 2010	Bergisch Gladbach	W. Bickel	·	1.4 km	MPC · JPL
695537	2015 XT_{402}	—	September 19, 2014	Haleakala	Pan-STARRS 1	·	2.7 km	MPC · JPL
695538	2015 XR_{403}	—	September 2, 2013	Mount Lemmon	Mount Lemmon Survey	·	2.1 km	MPC · JPL
695539	2015 XU_{403}	—	December 13, 2014	Haleakala	Pan-STARRS 1	·	1.9 km	MPC · JPL
695540	2015 XT_{404}	—	July 25, 2014	Haleakala	Pan-STARRS 1	HOF	1.9 km	MPC · JPL
695541	2015 XR_{405}	—	November 9, 2015	Mount Lemmon	Mount Lemmon Survey	·	660 m	MPC · JPL
695542	2015 XV_{405}	—	June 23, 2014	Mount Lemmon	Mount Lemmon Survey	NEM	1.9 km	MPC · JPL
695543	2015 XG_{406}	—	October 23, 2003	Apache Point	SDSS Collaboration	·	2.9 km	MPC · JPL
695544	2015 XW_{407}	—	December 2, 2010	Mount Lemmon	Mount Lemmon Survey	·	1.7 km	MPC · JPL
695545	2015 XG_{410}	—	September 28, 2003	Apache Point	SDSS Collaboration	·	1.9 km	MPC · JPL
695546	2015 XF_{411}	—	December 8, 2015	Mount Lemmon	Mount Lemmon Survey	V	380 m	MPC · JPL
695547	2015 XT_{411}	—	April 17, 2013	Haleakala	Pan-STARRS 1	·	2.5 km	MPC · JPL
695548	2015 XJ_{417}	—	October 29, 2008	Kitt Peak	Spacewatch	·	2.6 km	MPC · JPL
695549	2015 XV_{426}	—	December 3, 2015	Mount Lemmon	Mount Lemmon Survey	NYS	730 m	MPC · JPL
695550	2015 XM_{440}	—	December 8, 2015	Haleakala	Pan-STARRS 1	·	880 m	MPC · JPL
695551	2015 XQ_{440}	—	December 10, 2015	Haleakala	Pan-STARRS 1	·	730 m	MPC · JPL
695552	2015 XS_{440}	—	December 9, 2015	Haleakala	Pan-STARRS 1	AGN	1.0 km	MPC · JPL
695553	2015 XN_{443}	—	December 8, 2015	Haleakala	Pan-STARRS 1	·	1.6 km	MPC · JPL
695554	2015 XQ_{443}	—	December 9, 2015	Haleakala	Pan-STARRS 1	·	660 m	MPC · JPL
695555	2015 XS_{443}	—	December 9, 2015	Haleakala	Pan-STARRS 1	V	510 m	MPC · JPL
695556	2015 XT_{443}	—	December 14, 2015	Mount Lemmon	Mount Lemmon Survey	·	800 m	MPC · JPL
695557	2015 XF_{444}	—	December 13, 2015	Haleakala	Pan-STARRS 1	V	410 m	MPC · JPL
695558	2015 XN_{444}	—	December 8, 2015	Haleakala	Pan-STARRS 1	·	750 m	MPC · JPL
695559	2015 XT_{444}	—	December 13, 2015	Haleakala	Pan-STARRS 1	V	450 m	MPC · JPL
695560	2015 XP_{446}	—	December 13, 2015	Haleakala	Pan-STARRS 1	·	2.4 km	MPC · JPL
695561	2015 XR_{448}	—	December 14, 2015	Haleakala	Pan-STARRS 1	V	460 m	MPC · JPL
695562	2015 XW_{448}	—	December 4, 2015	Haleakala	Pan-STARRS 1	(2076)	640 m	MPC · JPL
695563	2015 XM_{449}	—	March 22, 2001	Kitt Peak	SKADS	·	1.7 km	MPC · JPL
695564	2015 XR_{449}	—	December 4, 2015	Haleakala	Pan-STARRS 1	·	2.4 km	MPC · JPL
695565	2015 XW_{452}	—	December 6, 2015	Mount Lemmon	Mount Lemmon Survey	·	2.2 km	MPC · JPL
695566	2015 XY_{452}	—	December 8, 2015	Haleakala	Pan-STARRS 1	EOS	1.5 km	MPC · JPL
695567	2015 XA_{453}	—	December 6, 2015	Mount Lemmon	Mount Lemmon Survey	·	2.2 km	MPC · JPL
695568	2015 XG_{453}	—	December 8, 2015	Haleakala	Pan-STARRS 1	EOS	1.2 km	MPC · JPL
695569	2015 XP_{454}	—	December 4, 2015	Haleakala	Pan-STARRS 1	·	2.6 km	MPC · JPL
695570	2015 XJ_{464}	—	December 13, 2015	Haleakala	Pan-STARRS 1	·	870 m	MPC · JPL
695571	2015 XP_{476}	—	December 9, 2015	Haleakala	Pan-STARRS 1	·	1.7 km	MPC · JPL
695572	2015 XJ_{483}	—	December 4, 2015	Haleakala	Pan-STARRS 1	·	810 m	MPC · JPL
695573	2015 XE_{490}	—	December 14, 2015	Haleakala	Pan-STARRS 1	·	730 m	MPC · JPL
695574	2015 XO_{492}	—	July 1, 2014	Haleakala	Pan-STARRS 1	V	510 m	MPC · JPL
695575	2015 XV_{496}	—	October 20, 2011	Mount Lemmon	Mount Lemmon Survey	·	900 m	MPC · JPL
695576	2015 XC_{500}	—	December 4, 2015	Haleakala	Pan-STARRS 1	·	2.1 km	MPC · JPL
695577	2015 XY_{507}	—	December 5, 2015	Haleakala	Pan-STARRS 1	EOS	1.1 km	MPC · JPL
695578	2015 XQ_{508}	—	December 7, 2015	Haleakala	Pan-STARRS 1	EOS	960 m	MPC · JPL
695579	2015 YX_{1}	—	November 7, 2004	Palomar	NEAT	T_{j} (2.98) · EUP	5.3 km	MPC · JPL
695580	2015 YW_{2}	—	April 7, 2007	Mount Lemmon	Mount Lemmon Survey	EOS	1.5 km	MPC · JPL
695581	2015 YH_{6}	—	September 15, 2010	Kitt Peak	Spacewatch	·	1.4 km	MPC · JPL
695582	2015 YU_{6}	—	November 12, 2015	Mount Lemmon	Mount Lemmon Survey	·	810 m	MPC · JPL
695583	2015 YE_{17}	—	December 3, 2015	Haleakala	Pan-STARRS 1	·	4.2 km	MPC · JPL
695584	2015 YL_{18}	—	February 11, 2011	Mount Lemmon	Mount Lemmon Survey	·	2.2 km	MPC · JPL
695585	2015 YT_{18}	—	December 10, 2015	Haleakala	Pan-STARRS 1	T_{j} (2.95)	4.7 km	MPC · JPL
695586	2015 YD_{23}	—	November 20, 2009	Kitt Peak	Spacewatch	·	2.4 km	MPC · JPL
695587	2015 YK_{25}	—	March 9, 2007	Kitt Peak	Spacewatch	·	1.7 km	MPC · JPL
695588	2015 YS_{25}	—	April 13, 2013	Haleakala	Pan-STARRS 1	·	970 m	MPC · JPL
695589	2015 YT_{25}	—	January 30, 2011	Mount Lemmon	Mount Lemmon Survey	EOS	1.7 km	MPC · JPL
695590	2015 YY_{25}	—	January 14, 2011	Mount Lemmon	Mount Lemmon Survey	·	1.6 km	MPC · JPL
695591	2015 YG_{26}	—	March 3, 2009	Kitt Peak	Spacewatch	·	850 m	MPC · JPL
695592	2015 YG_{32}	—	December 16, 2015	Mount Lemmon	Mount Lemmon Survey	·	660 m	MPC · JPL
695593	2015 YT_{32}	—	December 19, 2015	Mount Lemmon	Mount Lemmon Survey	ERI	1.2 km	MPC · JPL
695594	2015 YC_{34}	—	December 18, 2015	Mount Lemmon	Mount Lemmon Survey	·	2.6 km	MPC · JPL
695595	2016 AX	—	November 17, 2014	Mount Lemmon	Mount Lemmon Survey	·	2.4 km	MPC · JPL
695596	2016 AL_{1}	—	February 24, 2009	Kitt Peak	Spacewatch	·	800 m	MPC · JPL
695597	2016 AY_{4}	—	March 2, 2009	Kitt Peak	Spacewatch	·	900 m	MPC · JPL
695598	2016 AG_{5}	—	December 1, 2008	Mount Lemmon	Mount Lemmon Survey	·	660 m	MPC · JPL
695599	2016 AU_{5}	—	November 6, 2005	Mount Lemmon	Mount Lemmon Survey	AGN	1.1 km	MPC · JPL
695600	2016 AN_{6}	—	January 2, 2016	Haleakala	Pan-STARRS 1	·	900 m	MPC · JPL

== 695601–695700 ==
back to top

Designation			Discovery			Properties		Ref
Permanent	Provisional	Named after	Date	Site	Discoverer(s)	Category	Diam.	Ref
695601	2016 AC_{7}	—	December 14, 2001	Socorro	LINEAR	·	720 m	MPC · JPL
695602	2016 AD_{7}	—	December 4, 2002	Kitt Peak	Deep Ecliptic Survey	·	580 m	MPC · JPL
695603	2016 AV_{12}	—	September 30, 2003	Apache Point	SDSS Collaboration	·	920 m	MPC · JPL
695604	2016 AH_{14}	—	February 26, 2011	Mount Lemmon	Mount Lemmon Survey	·	2.3 km	MPC · JPL
695605	2016 AO_{14}	—	December 1, 2010	Mount Lemmon	Mount Lemmon Survey	·	1.8 km	MPC · JPL
695606	2016 AE_{17}	—	September 23, 2014	ESA OGS	ESA OGS	HYG	2.7 km	MPC · JPL
695607	2016 AP_{17}	—	December 3, 2015	Mount Lemmon	Mount Lemmon Survey	HOF	2.3 km	MPC · JPL
695608	2016 AW_{17}	—	October 1, 2014	Mount Lemmon	Mount Lemmon Survey	·	1.6 km	MPC · JPL
695609	2016 AE_{20}	—	January 3, 2016	Mount Lemmon	Mount Lemmon Survey	·	2.0 km	MPC · JPL
695610	2016 AN_{20}	—	October 27, 2005	Kitt Peak	Spacewatch	·	1.9 km	MPC · JPL
695611	2016 AX_{21}	—	February 3, 2009	Kitt Peak	Spacewatch	MAS	580 m	MPC · JPL
695612	2016 AG_{22}	—	December 25, 2005	Mount Lemmon	Mount Lemmon Survey	·	1.6 km	MPC · JPL
695613	2016 AB_{26}	—	December 20, 2004	Mount Lemmon	Mount Lemmon Survey	·	780 m	MPC · JPL
695614	2016 AG_{26}	—	April 29, 2012	Kitt Peak	Spacewatch	·	2.5 km	MPC · JPL
695615	2016 AU_{27}	—	May 25, 2006	Mauna Kea	P. A. Wiegert	HYG	2.5 km	MPC · JPL
695616	2016 AB_{30}	—	October 26, 2009	Mount Lemmon	Mount Lemmon Survey	·	2.1 km	MPC · JPL
695617	2016 AW_{30}	—	February 20, 2009	Kitt Peak	Spacewatch	·	880 m	MPC · JPL
695618	2016 AS_{32}	—	January 19, 2005	Kitt Peak	Spacewatch	·	850 m	MPC · JPL
695619	2016 AZ_{32}	—	August 20, 2008	Kitt Peak	Spacewatch	EOS	1.8 km	MPC · JPL
695620	2016 AV_{33}	—	March 13, 2007	Mount Lemmon	Mount Lemmon Survey	·	1.8 km	MPC · JPL
695621	2016 AK_{34}	—	January 16, 2009	Kitt Peak	Spacewatch	·	1.1 km	MPC · JPL
695622	2016 AO_{34}	—	December 21, 2008	Kitt Peak	Spacewatch	·	1.1 km	MPC · JPL
695623	2016 AA_{35}	—	October 1, 2014	Haleakala	Pan-STARRS 1	·	2.5 km	MPC · JPL
695624	2016 AO_{35}	—	January 3, 2016	Mount Lemmon	Mount Lemmon Survey	·	910 m	MPC · JPL
695625	2016 AX_{38}	—	January 4, 2016	Haleakala	Pan-STARRS 1	·	710 m	MPC · JPL
695626	2016 AK_{41}	—	January 17, 2007	Kitt Peak	Spacewatch	AGN	1.0 km	MPC · JPL
695627	2016 AV_{43}	—	March 14, 2007	Kitt Peak	Spacewatch	KOR	1.3 km	MPC · JPL
695628	2016 AQ_{44}	—	December 3, 2015	Mount Lemmon	Mount Lemmon Survey	L5	8.0 km	MPC · JPL
695629	2016 AU_{44}	—	December 13, 2010	Kitt Peak	Spacewatch	·	1.9 km	MPC · JPL
695630	2016 AH_{45}	—	September 21, 2003	Kitt Peak	Spacewatch	·	1.8 km	MPC · JPL
695631	2016 AH_{46}	—	July 25, 2014	Haleakala	Pan-STARRS 1	·	1.2 km	MPC · JPL
695632	2016 AP_{47}	—	August 23, 2004	Kitt Peak	Spacewatch	KOR	1.3 km	MPC · JPL
695633	2016 AS_{48}	—	November 27, 2010	Mount Lemmon	Mount Lemmon Survey	·	1.8 km	MPC · JPL
695634	2016 AP_{52}	—	October 7, 2005	Mauna Kea	A. Boattini	EOS	1.7 km	MPC · JPL
695635	2016 AA_{53}	—	August 23, 2014	Haleakala	Pan-STARRS 1	·	3.2 km	MPC · JPL
695636	2016 AH_{53}	—	August 20, 2014	Haleakala	Pan-STARRS 1	·	1.9 km	MPC · JPL
695637	2016 AY_{54}	—	September 6, 2008	Mount Lemmon	Mount Lemmon Survey	·	2.2 km	MPC · JPL
695638	2016 AF_{55}	—	October 3, 2014	Mount Lemmon	Mount Lemmon Survey	·	2.6 km	MPC · JPL
695639	2016 AN_{55}	—	March 4, 2006	Kitt Peak	Spacewatch	·	560 m	MPC · JPL
695640	2016 AT_{56}	—	March 10, 2011	Catalina	CSS	·	2.6 km	MPC · JPL
695641	2016 AM_{57}	—	November 9, 2009	Mount Lemmon	Mount Lemmon Survey	·	2.1 km	MPC · JPL
695642	2016 AF_{58}	—	July 14, 2013	Haleakala	Pan-STARRS 1	EOS	1.7 km	MPC · JPL
695643	2016 AM_{59}	—	January 4, 2016	Haleakala	Pan-STARRS 1	·	750 m	MPC · JPL
695644	2016 AV_{66}	—	December 11, 2009	Mount Lemmon	Mount Lemmon Survey	·	2.7 km	MPC · JPL
695645	2016 AA_{69}	—	December 12, 2006	Mount Lemmon	Mount Lemmon Survey	WIT	900 m	MPC · JPL
695646	2016 AK_{71}	—	September 20, 2009	Mount Lemmon	Mount Lemmon Survey	·	1.9 km	MPC · JPL
695647	2016 AM_{71}	—	January 3, 2011	Mount Lemmon	Mount Lemmon Survey	·	1.6 km	MPC · JPL
695648	2016 AJ_{76}	—	December 1, 2003	Kitt Peak	Spacewatch	·	3.3 km	MPC · JPL
695649	2016 AU_{80}	—	September 24, 2014	Catalina	CSS	·	3.2 km	MPC · JPL
695650	2016 AW_{81}	—	December 5, 2005	Mount Lemmon	Mount Lemmon Survey	KOR	1.1 km	MPC · JPL
695651	2016 AQ_{83}	—	September 23, 2015	Haleakala	Pan-STARRS 1	·	2.2 km	MPC · JPL
695652	2016 AV_{85}	—	January 28, 2011	Mount Lemmon	Mount Lemmon Survey	·	2.7 km	MPC · JPL
695653	2016 AQ_{86}	—	February 14, 2013	Haleakala	Pan-STARRS 1	·	940 m	MPC · JPL
695654	2016 AZ_{89}	—	September 23, 2015	Haleakala	Pan-STARRS 1	·	2.9 km	MPC · JPL
695655	2016 AH_{90}	—	November 9, 2009	Kitt Peak	Spacewatch	·	2.8 km	MPC · JPL
695656	2016 AZ_{90}	—	October 22, 2006	Kitt Peak	Spacewatch	·	1.5 km	MPC · JPL
695657	2016 AA_{91}	—	November 4, 2005	Mount Lemmon	Mount Lemmon Survey	·	630 m	MPC · JPL
695658	2016 AE_{94}	—	August 31, 2014	Kitt Peak	Spacewatch	·	2.5 km	MPC · JPL
695659	2016 AY_{95}	—	January 14, 2011	Mount Lemmon	Mount Lemmon Survey	KOR	1.1 km	MPC · JPL
695660	2016 AV_{96}	—	January 7, 2016	Haleakala	Pan-STARRS 1	·	810 m	MPC · JPL
695661	2016 AJ_{97}	—	October 11, 2007	Mount Lemmon	Mount Lemmon Survey	·	3.6 km	MPC · JPL
695662	2016 AN_{98}	—	October 7, 2007	Mount Lemmon	Mount Lemmon Survey	MAS	590 m	MPC · JPL
695663	2016 AO_{98}	—	October 10, 2008	Mount Lemmon	Mount Lemmon Survey	EOS	2.1 km	MPC · JPL
695664	2016 AU_{99}	—	January 30, 2009	Mount Lemmon	Mount Lemmon Survey	·	820 m	MPC · JPL
695665	2016 AC_{101}	—	December 18, 2009	Kitt Peak	Spacewatch	·	2.8 km	MPC · JPL
695666	2016 AW_{101}	—	October 24, 2011	Mount Lemmon	Mount Lemmon Survey	V	490 m	MPC · JPL
695667	2016 AZ_{101}	—	November 11, 2014	Haleakala	Pan-STARRS 1	·	2.9 km	MPC · JPL
695668	2016 AM_{102}	—	January 7, 2016	Haleakala	Pan-STARRS 1	EOS	1.4 km	MPC · JPL
695669	2016 AF_{105}	—	October 21, 2008	Mount Lemmon	Mount Lemmon Survey	·	2.3 km	MPC · JPL
695670	2016 AN_{105}	—	December 26, 2011	Mount Lemmon	Mount Lemmon Survey	·	1.0 km	MPC · JPL
695671	2016 AT_{106}	—	November 3, 2005	Mount Lemmon	Mount Lemmon Survey	HOF	2.6 km	MPC · JPL
695672	2016 AC_{107}	—	May 13, 2009	Mount Lemmon	Mount Lemmon Survey	·	940 m	MPC · JPL
695673	2016 AN_{113}	—	April 11, 2007	Mount Lemmon	Mount Lemmon Survey	·	1.5 km	MPC · JPL
695674	2016 AC_{114}	—	November 5, 2007	Mount Lemmon	Mount Lemmon Survey	MAS	560 m	MPC · JPL
695675	2016 AZ_{114}	—	November 21, 2014	Haleakala	Pan-STARRS 1	·	2.0 km	MPC · JPL
695676	2016 AF_{115}	—	April 27, 2012	Haleakala	Pan-STARRS 1	VER	2.5 km	MPC · JPL
695677	2016 AR_{115}	—	October 20, 2007	Mount Lemmon	Mount Lemmon Survey	·	940 m	MPC · JPL
695678	2016 AG_{117}	—	September 20, 2014	Haleakala	Pan-STARRS 1	EOS	1.9 km	MPC · JPL
695679	2016 AF_{120}	—	October 1, 2013	Mount Lemmon	Mount Lemmon Survey	SYL	3.4 km	MPC · JPL
695680	2016 AU_{120}	—	September 6, 2013	Kitt Peak	Spacewatch	·	3.4 km	MPC · JPL
695681	2016 AY_{122}	—	January 8, 2016	Haleakala	Pan-STARRS 1	·	2.7 km	MPC · JPL
695682	2016 AC_{128}	—	January 8, 2016	Haleakala	Pan-STARRS 1	EUN	850 m	MPC · JPL
695683	2016 AG_{136}	—	December 13, 2015	Haleakala	Pan-STARRS 1	·	2.2 km	MPC · JPL
695684	2016 AJ_{137}	—	October 1, 2014	Haleakala	Pan-STARRS 1	·	2.1 km	MPC · JPL
695685	2016 AJ_{138}	—	September 7, 2008	Mount Lemmon	Mount Lemmon Survey	·	2.1 km	MPC · JPL
695686	2016 AD_{140}	—	January 9, 2016	Haleakala	Pan-STARRS 1	·	1.1 km	MPC · JPL
695687	2016 AW_{141}	—	November 9, 2007	Mount Lemmon	Mount Lemmon Survey	·	990 m	MPC · JPL
695688	2016 AJ_{145}	—	January 9, 2016	Haleakala	Pan-STARRS 1	T_{j} (2.98)	3.2 km	MPC · JPL
695689	2016 AZ_{148}	—	September 19, 1998	Apache Point	SDSS Collaboration	EOS	1.3 km	MPC · JPL
695690	2016 AG_{153}	—	January 11, 2016	Haleakala	Pan-STARRS 1	·	840 m	MPC · JPL
695691	2016 AC_{157}	—	October 3, 2014	Mount Lemmon	Mount Lemmon Survey	PHO	630 m	MPC · JPL
695692	2016 AY_{162}	—	June 24, 2014	Haleakala	Pan-STARRS 1	H	320 m	MPC · JPL
695693	2016 AN_{163}	—	January 11, 2016	Haleakala	Pan-STARRS 1	PHO	730 m	MPC · JPL
695694	2016 AQ_{165}	—	December 9, 2015	Haleakala	Pan-STARRS 1	H	510 m	MPC · JPL
695695	2016 AC_{168}	—	October 13, 2014	Mount Lemmon	Mount Lemmon Survey	·	2.8 km	MPC · JPL
695696	2016 AB_{169}	—	November 19, 2003	Kitt Peak	Spacewatch	·	3.3 km	MPC · JPL
695697	2016 AX_{177}	—	October 22, 2003	Kitt Peak	Spacewatch	EOS	2.3 km	MPC · JPL
695698	2016 AY_{177}	—	December 13, 2015	Haleakala	Pan-STARRS 1	·	2.8 km	MPC · JPL
695699	2016 AA_{181}	—	June 9, 2013	Mount Lemmon	Mount Lemmon Survey	EOS	1.6 km	MPC · JPL
695700	2016 AY_{181}	—	September 29, 2008	Mount Lemmon	Mount Lemmon Survey	EOS	2.2 km	MPC · JPL

== 695701–695800 ==
back to top

Designation			Discovery			Properties		Ref
Permanent	Provisional	Named after	Date	Site	Discoverer(s)	Category	Diam.	Ref
695701	2016 AK_{182}	—	October 5, 2013	Haleakala	Pan-STARRS 1	·	3.2 km	MPC · JPL
695702	2016 AE_{188}	—	October 21, 2015	Haleakala	Pan-STARRS 1	TRE	2.0 km	MPC · JPL
695703	2016 AO_{189}	—	July 28, 2009	Catalina	CSS	·	2.0 km	MPC · JPL
695704	2016 AJ_{190}	—	January 13, 2016	Haleakala	Pan-STARRS 1	·	2.5 km	MPC · JPL
695705	2016 AL_{192}	—	December 3, 2015	Haleakala	Pan-STARRS 1	·	710 m	MPC · JPL
695706	2016 AP_{192}	—	June 21, 2007	Mount Lemmon	Mount Lemmon Survey	·	3.7 km	MPC · JPL
695707	2016 AV_{194}	—	August 18, 2014	Haleakala	Pan-STARRS 1	H	390 m	MPC · JPL
695708	2016 AH_{195}	—	January 12, 2016	Haleakala	Pan-STARRS 1	H	540 m	MPC · JPL
695709	2016 AN_{196}	—	June 22, 2014	Mount Lemmon	Mount Lemmon Survey	H	620 m	MPC · JPL
695710	2016 AP_{196}	—	March 4, 2011	Catalina	CSS	H	410 m	MPC · JPL
695711	2016 AV_{198}	—	February 11, 2008	Kitt Peak	Spacewatch	H	460 m	MPC · JPL
695712	2016 AC_{200}	—	January 14, 2016	Haleakala	Pan-STARRS 1	H	350 m	MPC · JPL
695713	2016 AX_{200}	—	November 27, 2010	Mount Lemmon	Mount Lemmon Survey	AGN	1.0 km	MPC · JPL
695714	2016 AF_{211}	—	January 9, 2016	Haleakala	Pan-STARRS 1	·	970 m	MPC · JPL
695715	2016 AK_{216}	—	September 4, 2008	Kitt Peak	Spacewatch	HYG	2.2 km	MPC · JPL
695716	2016 AZ_{216}	—	March 9, 2011	Mount Lemmon	Mount Lemmon Survey	·	2.6 km	MPC · JPL
695717	2016 AD_{217}	—	January 7, 2016	Haleakala	Pan-STARRS 1	NYS	920 m	MPC · JPL
695718	2016 AF_{217}	—	October 8, 2008	Kitt Peak	Spacewatch	·	2.5 km	MPC · JPL
695719	2016 AG_{217}	—	December 20, 2004	Mount Lemmon	Mount Lemmon Survey	·	2.3 km	MPC · JPL
695720	2016 AH_{217}	—	October 2, 2013	Mount Lemmon	Mount Lemmon Survey	THM	2.2 km	MPC · JPL
695721	2016 AU_{219}	—	January 31, 2009	Kitt Peak	Spacewatch	·	830 m	MPC · JPL
695722	2016 AC_{220}	—	August 14, 2013	Haleakala	Pan-STARRS 1	·	1.8 km	MPC · JPL
695723	2016 AN_{220}	—	August 19, 2006	Kitt Peak	Spacewatch	·	3.4 km	MPC · JPL
695724	2016 AN_{222}	—	September 28, 1997	Kitt Peak	Spacewatch	·	2.5 km	MPC · JPL
695725	2016 AW_{222}	—	January 2, 2016	Mount Lemmon	Mount Lemmon Survey	·	820 m	MPC · JPL
695726	2016 AB_{223}	—	March 27, 2012	Mount Lemmon	Mount Lemmon Survey	EOS	1.7 km	MPC · JPL
695727	2016 AC_{223}	—	February 8, 2011	Kitt Peak	Spacewatch	EOS	1.5 km	MPC · JPL
695728	2016 AE_{223}	—	February 4, 2000	Kitt Peak	Spacewatch	·	2.7 km	MPC · JPL
695729	2016 AF_{223}	—	January 3, 2016	Haleakala	Pan-STARRS 1	THM	2.2 km	MPC · JPL
695730	2016 AH_{223}	—	October 7, 2007	Mount Lemmon	Mount Lemmon Survey	·	800 m	MPC · JPL
695731	2016 AK_{223}	—	January 3, 2016	Haleakala	Pan-STARRS 1	·	740 m	MPC · JPL
695732	2016 AT_{223}	—	September 13, 2013	Mount Lemmon	Mount Lemmon Survey	·	3.0 km	MPC · JPL
695733	2016 AF_{224}	—	February 14, 2005	Kitt Peak	Spacewatch	EOS	2.1 km	MPC · JPL
695734	2016 AL_{225}	—	November 15, 2007	Mount Lemmon	Mount Lemmon Survey	·	880 m	MPC · JPL
695735	2016 AE_{226}	—	January 30, 2006	Kitt Peak	Spacewatch	·	2.0 km	MPC · JPL
695736	2016 AS_{227}	—	December 20, 2009	Mount Lemmon	Mount Lemmon Survey	·	3.2 km	MPC · JPL
695737	2016 AT_{227}	—	February 12, 2011	Mount Lemmon	Mount Lemmon Survey	·	3.6 km	MPC · JPL
695738	2016 AC_{228}	—	November 8, 2008	Mount Lemmon	Mount Lemmon Survey	·	2.9 km	MPC · JPL
695739	2016 AA_{230}	—	October 9, 2008	Mount Lemmon	Mount Lemmon Survey	·	2.7 km	MPC · JPL
695740	2016 AA_{231}	—	January 30, 2011	Mount Lemmon	Mount Lemmon Survey	·	2.0 km	MPC · JPL
695741	2016 AB_{231}	—	October 26, 2011	Haleakala	Pan-STARRS 1	NYS	740 m	MPC · JPL
695742	2016 AD_{231}	—	October 30, 2014	Mount Lemmon	Mount Lemmon Survey	·	1.6 km	MPC · JPL
695743	2016 AG_{231}	—	October 1, 2009	Mount Lemmon	Mount Lemmon Survey	EOS	1.7 km	MPC · JPL
695744	2016 AM_{231}	—	October 25, 2014	Mount Lemmon	Mount Lemmon Survey	·	1.5 km	MPC · JPL
695745	2016 AT_{231}	—	September 21, 2009	Mount Lemmon	Mount Lemmon Survey	·	1.8 km	MPC · JPL
695746	2016 AU_{231}	—	February 28, 2009	Kitt Peak	Spacewatch	·	1.2 km	MPC · JPL
695747	2016 AK_{233}	—	January 3, 2016	Haleakala	Pan-STARRS 1	·	710 m	MPC · JPL
695748	2016 AC_{236}	—	December 25, 2001	Kitt Peak	Spacewatch	·	2.0 km	MPC · JPL
695749	2016 AE_{236}	—	October 5, 2003	Kitt Peak	Spacewatch	EOS	1.9 km	MPC · JPL
695750	2016 AG_{236}	—	November 20, 2003	Kitt Peak	Spacewatch	·	2.6 km	MPC · JPL
695751	2016 AR_{237}	—	May 11, 2007	Mount Lemmon	Mount Lemmon Survey	KOR	1.4 km	MPC · JPL
695752	2016 AW_{237}	—	May 20, 2006	Mount Lemmon	Mount Lemmon Survey	·	2.7 km	MPC · JPL
695753	2016 AX_{237}	—	September 24, 2008	Mount Lemmon	Mount Lemmon Survey	·	2.4 km	MPC · JPL
695754	2016 AJ_{241}	—	September 27, 2009	Mount Lemmon	Mount Lemmon Survey	KOR	1.1 km	MPC · JPL
695755	2016 AP_{242}	—	August 28, 2013	Mount Lemmon	Mount Lemmon Survey	·	1.6 km	MPC · JPL
695756	2016 AE_{243}	—	January 3, 2016	Haleakala	Pan-STARRS 1	·	720 m	MPC · JPL
695757	2016 AQ_{245}	—	April 2, 2009	Kitt Peak	Spacewatch	NYS	1 km	MPC · JPL
695758	2016 AK_{247}	—	January 29, 2003	Kitt Peak	Spacewatch	·	1.5 km	MPC · JPL
695759	2016 AW_{249}	—	January 4, 2016	Haleakala	Pan-STARRS 1	V	510 m	MPC · JPL
695760	2016 AK_{250}	—	January 28, 2011	Mount Lemmon	Mount Lemmon Survey	·	1.4 km	MPC · JPL
695761	2016 AY_{250}	—	February 10, 2011	Mount Lemmon	Mount Lemmon Survey	EOS	1.4 km	MPC · JPL
695762	2016 AQ_{251}	—	January 4, 2016	Haleakala	Pan-STARRS 1	V	470 m	MPC · JPL
695763	2016 AF_{253}	—	October 31, 2013	Mount Lemmon	Mount Lemmon Survey	·	3.5 km	MPC · JPL
695764	2016 AL_{255}	—	January 7, 2016	Haleakala	Pan-STARRS 1	CLA	1.2 km	MPC · JPL
695765	2016 AR_{255}	—	October 4, 2014	Mount Lemmon	Mount Lemmon Survey	·	2.8 km	MPC · JPL
695766	2016 AH_{256}	—	September 18, 2014	Haleakala	Pan-STARRS 1	·	1.9 km	MPC · JPL
695767	2016 AB_{261}	—	January 8, 2016	Haleakala	Pan-STARRS 1	·	1.4 km	MPC · JPL
695768	2016 AH_{261}	—	March 2, 2011	Mount Lemmon	Mount Lemmon Survey	·	2.7 km	MPC · JPL
695769	2016 AL_{262}	—	March 3, 2000	Apache Point	SDSS	EOS	1.6 km	MPC · JPL
695770	2016 AS_{265}	—	January 9, 2016	Haleakala	Pan-STARRS 1	PHO	790 m	MPC · JPL
695771	2016 AJ_{270}	—	December 5, 2008	Kitt Peak	Spacewatch	·	3.2 km	MPC · JPL
695772	2016 AR_{271}	—	November 3, 2008	Mount Lemmon	Mount Lemmon Survey	·	800 m	MPC · JPL
695773	2016 AG_{272}	—	October 23, 2011	Haleakala	Pan-STARRS 1	·	860 m	MPC · JPL
695774	2016 AC_{275}	—	January 14, 2016	Haleakala	Pan-STARRS 1	·	2.2 km	MPC · JPL
695775	2016 AE_{276}	—	August 14, 2013	Haleakala	Pan-STARRS 1	·	2.1 km	MPC · JPL
695776	2016 AL_{276}	—	January 14, 2016	Haleakala	Pan-STARRS 1	V	460 m	MPC · JPL
695777	2016 AT_{276}	—	July 2, 2013	Haleakala	Pan-STARRS 1	·	2.8 km	MPC · JPL
695778	2016 AR_{291}	—	January 4, 2016	Haleakala	Pan-STARRS 1	·	2.6 km	MPC · JPL
695779	2016 AU_{296}	—	January 7, 2016	Haleakala	Pan-STARRS 1	·	2.6 km	MPC · JPL
695780	2016 AF_{301}	—	January 2, 2016	Mount Lemmon	Mount Lemmon Survey	·	850 m	MPC · JPL
695781	2016 AB_{305}	—	January 12, 2016	Haleakala	Pan-STARRS 1	·	1.1 km	MPC · JPL
695782	2016 AW_{305}	—	January 4, 2016	Haleakala	Pan-STARRS 1	CLA	1.1 km	MPC · JPL
695783	2016 AA_{306}	—	January 2, 2016	Haleakala	Pan-STARRS 1	MAS	540 m	MPC · JPL
695784	2016 AB_{306}	—	January 3, 2016	Mount Lemmon	Mount Lemmon Survey	·	1.6 km	MPC · JPL
695785	2016 AS_{306}	—	January 3, 2016	Haleakala	Pan-STARRS 1	NYS	830 m	MPC · JPL
695786	2016 AX_{308}	—	January 4, 2016	Haleakala	Pan-STARRS 1	·	770 m	MPC · JPL
695787	2016 AQ_{309}	—	January 2, 2016	Haleakala	Pan-STARRS 1	·	810 m	MPC · JPL
695788	2016 AH_{311}	—	January 4, 2016	Haleakala	Pan-STARRS 1	·	960 m	MPC · JPL
695789	2016 AZ_{311}	—	January 3, 2016	Haleakala	Pan-STARRS 1	·	880 m	MPC · JPL
695790	2016 AP_{315}	—	January 2, 2016	Mount Lemmon	Mount Lemmon Survey	·	580 m	MPC · JPL
695791	2016 AB_{316}	—	January 4, 2016	Haleakala	Pan-STARRS 1	·	2.5 km	MPC · JPL
695792	2016 AR_{316}	—	January 2, 2016	Mount Lemmon	Mount Lemmon Survey	·	1.0 km	MPC · JPL
695793	2016 AH_{320}	—	January 3, 2016	Haleakala	Pan-STARRS 1	·	930 m	MPC · JPL
695794	2016 AQ_{324}	—	January 4, 2016	Haleakala	Pan-STARRS 1	·	880 m	MPC · JPL
695795	2016 AK_{325}	—	January 4, 2016	Haleakala	Pan-STARRS 1	HYG	1.6 km	MPC · JPL
695796	2016 AT_{329}	—	January 4, 2016	Haleakala	Pan-STARRS 1	·	850 m	MPC · JPL
695797	2016 AM_{342}	—	January 4, 2016	Haleakala	Pan-STARRS 1	V	450 m	MPC · JPL
695798	2016 AX_{344}	—	January 12, 2016	Haleakala	Pan-STARRS 1	·	3.3 km	MPC · JPL
695799	2016 AP_{347}	—	January 3, 2016	Haleakala	Pan-STARRS 1	·	2.5 km	MPC · JPL
695800	2016 AE_{351}	—	January 4, 2016	Haleakala	Pan-STARRS 1	·	860 m	MPC · JPL

== 695801–695900 ==
back to top

Designation			Discovery			Properties		Ref
Permanent	Provisional	Named after	Date	Site	Discoverer(s)	Category	Diam.	Ref
695801	2016 AQ_{352}	—	January 7, 2016	Haleakala	Pan-STARRS 1	·	800 m	MPC · JPL
695802	2016 AX_{354}	—	September 19, 2014	Haleakala	Pan-STARRS 1	·	960 m	MPC · JPL
695803	2016 AV_{359}	—	January 11, 2016	Haleakala	Pan-STARRS 1	H	320 m	MPC · JPL
695804	2016 AJ_{365}	—	January 3, 2016	Mount Lemmon	Mount Lemmon Survey	AEO	640 m	MPC · JPL
695805	2016 BV_{3}	—	December 25, 2010	Mount Lemmon	Mount Lemmon Survey	·	1.6 km	MPC · JPL
695806	2016 BK_{5}	—	December 9, 2015	Haleakala	Pan-STARRS 1	·	3.4 km	MPC · JPL
695807	2016 BE_{9}	—	September 19, 2014	Haleakala	Pan-STARRS 1	V	600 m	MPC · JPL
695808	2016 BE_{12}	—	August 30, 2014	Haleakala	Pan-STARRS 1	·	2.0 km	MPC · JPL
695809	2016 BG_{12}	—	January 4, 2016	Haleakala	Pan-STARRS 1	·	550 m	MPC · JPL
695810	2016 BM_{14}	—	January 28, 2016	Haleakala	Pan-STARRS 1	H	440 m	MPC · JPL
695811	2016 BB_{17}	—	December 23, 2001	Kitt Peak	Spacewatch	·	730 m	MPC · JPL
695812	2016 BY_{17}	—	January 7, 2016	Haleakala	Pan-STARRS 1	·	2.3 km	MPC · JPL
695813	2016 BD_{19}	—	September 18, 2009	Kitt Peak	Spacewatch	KOR	1.2 km	MPC · JPL
695814	2016 BR_{20}	—	August 9, 2007	Kitt Peak	Spacewatch	·	720 m	MPC · JPL
695815	2016 BZ_{20}	—	June 28, 2014	Haleakala	Pan-STARRS 1	·	1.3 km	MPC · JPL
695816	2016 BA_{22}	—	October 8, 2007	Mount Lemmon	Mount Lemmon Survey	MAS	570 m	MPC · JPL
695817	2016 BH_{22}	—	August 12, 2013	Kitt Peak	Spacewatch	VER	2.6 km	MPC · JPL
695818	2016 BS_{23}	—	August 29, 2009	Kitt Peak	Spacewatch	·	1.8 km	MPC · JPL
695819	2016 BQ_{24}	—	September 4, 2007	Mount Lemmon	Mount Lemmon Survey	·	3.3 km	MPC · JPL
695820	2016 BN_{25}	—	June 18, 2013	Haleakala	Pan-STARRS 1	EOS	1.6 km	MPC · JPL
695821	2016 BF_{26}	—	January 11, 2011	Kitt Peak	Spacewatch	·	1.4 km	MPC · JPL
695822	2016 BG_{26}	—	September 30, 2005	Kitt Peak	Spacewatch	·	1.9 km	MPC · JPL
695823	2016 BX_{27}	—	June 20, 2013	Haleakala	Pan-STARRS 1	EOS	2.1 km	MPC · JPL
695824	2016 BV_{29}	—	April 29, 2011	Kitt Peak	Spacewatch	·	3.1 km	MPC · JPL
695825	2016 BW_{30}	—	January 8, 2016	Haleakala	Pan-STARRS 1	·	930 m	MPC · JPL
695826	2016 BQ_{33}	—	October 26, 2011	Haleakala	Pan-STARRS 1	MAS	570 m	MPC · JPL
695827	2016 BZ_{33}	—	August 12, 2013	Haleakala	Pan-STARRS 1	·	2.4 km	MPC · JPL
695828	2016 BM_{34}	—	September 15, 2004	Kitt Peak	Spacewatch	KOR	1.2 km	MPC · JPL
695829	2016 BG_{35}	—	September 12, 2007	Mount Lemmon	Mount Lemmon Survey	NYS	950 m	MPC · JPL
695830	2016 BK_{37}	—	January 7, 2016	Haleakala	Pan-STARRS 1	PHO	660 m	MPC · JPL
695831	2016 BX_{38}	—	July 8, 2014	Haleakala	Pan-STARRS 1	·	1.0 km	MPC · JPL
695832	2016 BG_{44}	—	August 12, 2013	Haleakala	Pan-STARRS 1	·	3.0 km	MPC · JPL
695833	2016 BW_{44}	—	January 29, 2016	Mount Lemmon	Mount Lemmon Survey	·	2.1 km	MPC · JPL
695834	2016 BL_{47}	—	October 26, 2011	Zelenchukskaya Stn	T. V. Krjačko, Satovski, B.	·	740 m	MPC · JPL
695835	2016 BX_{49}	—	October 24, 2011	Kitt Peak	Spacewatch	·	990 m	MPC · JPL
695836	2016 BV_{52}	—	February 4, 2006	Kitt Peak	Spacewatch	KOR	1.1 km	MPC · JPL
695837	2016 BY_{52}	—	August 14, 2013	Haleakala	Pan-STARRS 1	·	2.9 km	MPC · JPL
695838	2016 BJ_{54}	—	January 27, 2006	Mount Lemmon	Mount Lemmon Survey	·	2.0 km	MPC · JPL
695839	2016 BJ_{55}	—	July 29, 2008	Kitt Peak	Spacewatch	EOS	1.7 km	MPC · JPL
695840	2016 BD_{57}	—	January 30, 2006	Kitt Peak	Spacewatch	·	1.6 km	MPC · JPL
695841	2016 BE_{57}	—	July 23, 2007	Lulin	LUSS	·	3.1 km	MPC · JPL
695842	2016 BQ_{58}	—	January 9, 2016	Haleakala	Pan-STARRS 1	MAS	580 m	MPC · JPL
695843	2016 BB_{59}	—	April 18, 2009	Mount Lemmon	Mount Lemmon Survey	MAS	580 m	MPC · JPL
695844	2016 BF_{60}	—	September 18, 2003	Kitt Peak	Spacewatch	·	2.1 km	MPC · JPL
695845	2016 BJ_{60}	—	September 5, 2008	Kitt Peak	Spacewatch	·	2.5 km	MPC · JPL
695846	2016 BK_{60}	—	January 30, 2016	Mount Lemmon	Mount Lemmon Survey	·	970 m	MPC · JPL
695847	2016 BN_{60}	—	January 8, 2016	Haleakala	Pan-STARRS 1	·	2.9 km	MPC · JPL
695848	2016 BS_{60}	—	September 13, 2007	Mount Lemmon	Mount Lemmon Survey	·	1 km	MPC · JPL
695849	2016 BZ_{60}	—	December 25, 2011	Mount Lemmon	Mount Lemmon Survey	MAS	570 m	MPC · JPL
695850	2016 BQ_{62}	—	August 20, 2014	Haleakala	Pan-STARRS 1	(5651)	2.7 km	MPC · JPL
695851	2016 BB_{63}	—	November 24, 2014	Mount Lemmon	Mount Lemmon Survey	·	2.8 km	MPC · JPL
695852	2016 BV_{67}	—	October 2, 2003	Kitt Peak	Spacewatch	·	2.7 km	MPC · JPL
695853	2016 BS_{76}	—	November 24, 2011	Mount Lemmon	Mount Lemmon Survey	MAS	460 m	MPC · JPL
695854	2016 BX_{76}	—	July 13, 2013	Haleakala	Pan-STARRS 1	·	1.6 km	MPC · JPL
695855	2016 BC_{78}	—	October 18, 2003	Kitt Peak	Spacewatch	·	1.9 km	MPC · JPL
695856	2016 BG_{78}	—	September 11, 2007	Mount Lemmon	Mount Lemmon Survey	CLA	1.2 km	MPC · JPL
695857	2016 BA_{81}	—	March 19, 2009	Kitt Peak	Spacewatch	NYS	1.1 km	MPC · JPL
695858	2016 BR_{88}	—	January 12, 2011	Mount Lemmon	Mount Lemmon Survey	·	1.5 km	MPC · JPL
695859	2016 BN_{89}	—	August 15, 2013	Haleakala	Pan-STARRS 1	·	2.9 km	MPC · JPL
695860	2016 BD_{91}	—	August 12, 2013	Haleakala	Pan-STARRS 1	NAE	1.6 km	MPC · JPL
695861	2016 BG_{91}	—	January 17, 2016	Haleakala	Pan-STARRS 1	EUN	840 m	MPC · JPL
695862	2016 BM_{91}	—	January 18, 2016	Haleakala	Pan-STARRS 1	·	830 m	MPC · JPL
695863	2016 BK_{93}	—	February 5, 2000	Kitt Peak	Spacewatch	·	790 m	MPC · JPL
695864	2016 BU_{93}	—	August 15, 2013	Haleakala	Pan-STARRS 1	VER	2.6 km	MPC · JPL
695865	2016 BF_{94}	—	September 16, 2003	Kitt Peak	Spacewatch	·	1.6 km	MPC · JPL
695866	2016 BG_{94}	—	January 31, 2016	Mount Lemmon	Mount Lemmon Survey	·	990 m	MPC · JPL
695867	2016 BA_{95}	—	January 16, 2016	Haleakala	Pan-STARRS 1	EOS	1.5 km	MPC · JPL
695868	2016 BR_{96}	—	January 17, 2016	Haleakala	Pan-STARRS 1	MAS	540 m	MPC · JPL
695869	2016 BY_{96}	—	September 14, 2013	Mount Lemmon	Mount Lemmon Survey	EOS	1.3 km	MPC · JPL
695870	2016 BZ_{97}	—	November 10, 2009	Kitt Peak	Spacewatch	KOR	1.3 km	MPC · JPL
695871	2016 BC_{98}	—	January 17, 2016	Haleakala	Pan-STARRS 1	NYS	870 m	MPC · JPL
695872	2016 BP_{98}	—	January 28, 2004	Kitt Peak	Spacewatch	·	2.8 km	MPC · JPL
695873	2016 BW_{104}	—	September 2, 2014	Haleakala	Pan-STARRS 1	·	790 m	MPC · JPL
695874	2016 BA_{105}	—	August 28, 2014	Haleakala	Pan-STARRS 1	·	840 m	MPC · JPL
695875	2016 BG_{113}	—	January 17, 2016	Haleakala	Pan-STARRS 1	·	730 m	MPC · JPL
695876	2016 BK_{114}	—	January 31, 2016	Haleakala	Pan-STARRS 1	·	700 m	MPC · JPL
695877	2016 BR_{130}	—	January 29, 2016	Mount Lemmon	Mount Lemmon Survey	NYS	830 m	MPC · JPL
695878	2016 BT_{130}	—	January 30, 2016	Mount Lemmon	Mount Lemmon Survey	V	490 m	MPC · JPL
695879	2016 BC_{134}	—	August 30, 2014	Haleakala	Pan-STARRS 1	·	750 m	MPC · JPL
695880	2016 BH_{138}	—	November 9, 2007	Kitt Peak	Spacewatch	·	820 m	MPC · JPL
695881	2016 BT_{139}	—	October 31, 2014	Mount Lemmon	Mount Lemmon Survey	·	2.0 km	MPC · JPL
695882	2016 CM_{2}	—	May 8, 2013	Haleakala	Pan-STARRS 1	·	820 m	MPC · JPL
695883	2016 CZ_{5}	—	March 21, 2009	Kitt Peak	Spacewatch	NYS	920 m	MPC · JPL
695884	2016 CP_{6}	—	February 27, 2006	Mount Lemmon	Mount Lemmon Survey	·	1.6 km	MPC · JPL
695885	2016 CX_{6}	—	October 15, 2007	Mount Lemmon	Mount Lemmon Survey	·	740 m	MPC · JPL
695886	2016 CE_{7}	—	March 4, 2005	Mount Lemmon	Mount Lemmon Survey	·	870 m	MPC · JPL
695887	2016 CV_{7}	—	August 9, 2013	Haleakala	Pan-STARRS 1	VER	2.5 km	MPC · JPL
695888	2016 CB_{10}	—	January 4, 2016	Haleakala	Pan-STARRS 1	EOS	1.6 km	MPC · JPL
695889	2016 CR_{10}	—	September 23, 2008	Mount Lemmon	Mount Lemmon Survey	·	3.0 km	MPC · JPL
695890	2016 CZ_{12}	—	March 11, 2005	Mount Lemmon	Mount Lemmon Survey	NYS	930 m	MPC · JPL
695891	2016 CS_{13}	—	December 21, 2008	Mount Lemmon	Mount Lemmon Survey	·	4.0 km	MPC · JPL
695892	2016 CP_{14}	—	September 10, 2007	Kitt Peak	Spacewatch	·	700 m	MPC · JPL
695893	2016 CG_{16}	—	February 20, 2009	Mount Lemmon	Mount Lemmon Survey	·	840 m	MPC · JPL
695894	2016 CS_{17}	—	February 16, 2010	Mount Lemmon	Mount Lemmon Survey	HYG	2.9 km	MPC · JPL
695895	2016 CM_{19}	—	October 8, 2008	Mount Lemmon	Mount Lemmon Survey	·	3.1 km	MPC · JPL
695896	2016 CD_{20}	—	February 14, 2005	Kitt Peak	Spacewatch	·	3.0 km	MPC · JPL
695897	2016 CG_{20}	—	October 11, 2010	Mount Lemmon	Mount Lemmon Survey	·	1.4 km	MPC · JPL
695898	2016 CW_{20}	—	January 15, 2016	Haleakala	Pan-STARRS 1	V	540 m	MPC · JPL
695899	2016 CS_{21}	—	July 12, 2013	Haleakala	Pan-STARRS 1	EOS	1.5 km	MPC · JPL
695900	2016 CC_{22}	—	March 29, 2009	Bergisch Gladbach	W. Bickel	·	880 m	MPC · JPL

== 695901–696000 ==
back to top

Designation			Discovery			Properties		Ref
Permanent	Provisional	Named after	Date	Site	Discoverer(s)	Category	Diam.	Ref
695901	2016 CQ_{22}	—	March 24, 2006	Kitt Peak	Spacewatch	·	2.6 km	MPC · JPL
695902	2016 CG_{26}	—	March 10, 2005	Kitt Peak	Deep Ecliptic Survey	·	850 m	MPC · JPL
695903	2016 CO_{28}	—	November 26, 2014	Haleakala	Pan-STARRS 1	·	2.5 km	MPC · JPL
695904	2016 CN_{33}	—	April 4, 1998	Kitt Peak	Spacewatch	NYS	840 m	MPC · JPL
695905	2016 CH_{36}	—	January 29, 2016	Mount Lemmon	Mount Lemmon Survey	·	910 m	MPC · JPL
695906	2016 CU_{37}	—	October 9, 2007	Mount Lemmon	Mount Lemmon Survey	NYS	730 m	MPC · JPL
695907	2016 CG_{38}	—	March 12, 2011	Mount Lemmon	Mount Lemmon Survey	·	2.7 km	MPC · JPL
695908	2016 CJ_{38}	—	September 3, 2008	Kitt Peak	Spacewatch	EOS	1.9 km	MPC · JPL
695909	2016 CS_{39}	—	February 3, 2006	Mauna Kea	P. A. Wiegert, R. Rasmussen	KOR	1.0 km	MPC · JPL
695910	2016 CJ_{41}	—	January 8, 2016	Haleakala	Pan-STARRS 1	·	970 m	MPC · JPL
695911	2016 CT_{43}	—	April 2, 2009	Kitt Peak	Spacewatch	·	920 m	MPC · JPL
695912	2016 CK_{44}	—	December 19, 2004	Mount Lemmon	Mount Lemmon Survey	·	2.1 km	MPC · JPL
695913	2016 CT_{46}	—	March 9, 2011	Mount Lemmon	Mount Lemmon Survey	·	2.1 km	MPC · JPL
695914	2016 CA_{47}	—	October 12, 2007	Kitt Peak	Spacewatch	MAS	520 m	MPC · JPL
695915	2016 CQ_{47}	—	September 18, 2014	Haleakala	Pan-STARRS 1	·	1.5 km	MPC · JPL
695916	2016 CG_{50}	—	November 21, 2007	Mount Lemmon	Mount Lemmon Survey	·	940 m	MPC · JPL
695917	2016 CD_{52}	—	September 29, 2008	Mount Lemmon	Mount Lemmon Survey	·	2.7 km	MPC · JPL
695918	2016 CS_{52}	—	February 1, 2005	Kitt Peak	Spacewatch	NYS	870 m	MPC · JPL
695919	2016 CT_{53}	—	December 18, 2007	Kitt Peak	Spacewatch	MAS	590 m	MPC · JPL
695920	2016 CZ_{54}	—	March 14, 2011	Mount Lemmon	Mount Lemmon Survey	VER	2.4 km	MPC · JPL
695921	2016 CY_{55}	—	April 21, 2009	Kitt Peak	Spacewatch	·	990 m	MPC · JPL
695922	2016 CF_{70}	—	August 28, 2003	Palomar	NEAT	·	1.4 km	MPC · JPL
695923	2016 CF_{71}	—	October 9, 2007	Mount Lemmon	Mount Lemmon Survey	·	920 m	MPC · JPL
695924	2016 CN_{71}	—	November 17, 2011	Mount Lemmon	Mount Lemmon Survey	V	470 m	MPC · JPL
695925	2016 CE_{73}	—	November 1, 2008	Kitt Peak	Spacewatch	·	2.3 km	MPC · JPL
695926	2016 CQ_{73}	—	November 3, 2008	Kitt Peak	Spacewatch	·	2.9 km	MPC · JPL
695927	2016 CX_{73}	—	March 6, 2008	Mount Lemmon	Mount Lemmon Survey	·	1.5 km	MPC · JPL
695928	2016 CJ_{74}	—	October 23, 2006	Mount Lemmon	Mount Lemmon Survey	·	2.0 km	MPC · JPL
695929	2016 CV_{76}	—	February 24, 2006	Kitt Peak	Spacewatch	·	1.9 km	MPC · JPL
695930	2016 CO_{77}	—	April 26, 2009	Kitt Peak	Spacewatch	·	920 m	MPC · JPL
695931	2016 CT_{78}	—	November 28, 2014	Haleakala	Pan-STARRS 1	·	1.9 km	MPC · JPL
695932	2016 CO_{79}	—	February 5, 2016	Haleakala	Pan-STARRS 1	·	860 m	MPC · JPL
695933	2016 CP_{79}	—	September 1, 2013	Haleakala	Pan-STARRS 1	·	2.2 km	MPC · JPL
695934	2016 CF_{84}	—	April 17, 2013	Haleakala	Pan-STARRS 1	·	1.1 km	MPC · JPL
695935	2016 CG_{84}	—	November 7, 2008	Mount Lemmon	Mount Lemmon Survey	·	2.8 km	MPC · JPL
695936	2016 CJ_{88}	—	December 4, 2007	Mount Lemmon	Mount Lemmon Survey	V	480 m	MPC · JPL
695937	2016 CS_{95}	—	October 26, 2001	Kitt Peak	Spacewatch	·	680 m	MPC · JPL
695938	2016 CO_{98}	—	March 14, 2011	Mount Lemmon	Mount Lemmon Survey	·	2.3 km	MPC · JPL
695939	2016 CS_{104}	—	April 30, 2013	Mount Lemmon	Mount Lemmon Survey	·	510 m	MPC · JPL
695940	2016 CC_{105}	—	January 4, 2016	Haleakala	Pan-STARRS 1	·	900 m	MPC · JPL
695941	2016 CY_{105}	—	October 26, 2009	Mount Lemmon	Mount Lemmon Survey	·	1.8 km	MPC · JPL
695942	2016 CV_{108}	—	May 16, 2013	Haleakala	Pan-STARRS 1	·	960 m	MPC · JPL
695943	2016 CS_{109}	—	March 14, 2005	Mount Lemmon	Mount Lemmon Survey	·	3.0 km	MPC · JPL
695944	2016 CC_{112}	—	February 5, 2011	Haleakala	Pan-STARRS 1	·	1.2 km	MPC · JPL
695945	2016 CU_{114}	—	October 1, 2008	Kitt Peak	Spacewatch	·	2.7 km	MPC · JPL
695946	2016 CN_{121}	—	September 19, 2014	Haleakala	Pan-STARRS 1	·	780 m	MPC · JPL
695947	2016 CM_{122}	—	December 9, 2015	Haleakala	Pan-STARRS 1	·	950 m	MPC · JPL
695948	2016 CP_{126}	—	April 3, 2011	Siding Spring	SSS	·	3.5 km	MPC · JPL
695949	2016 CH_{130}	—	October 26, 2008	Kitt Peak	Spacewatch	·	2.7 km	MPC · JPL
695950	2016 CQ_{131}	—	August 15, 2012	Siding Spring	SSS	·	3.8 km	MPC · JPL
695951	2016 CD_{133}	—	March 3, 2009	Mount Lemmon	Mount Lemmon Survey	·	760 m	MPC · JPL
695952	2016 CD_{135}	—	August 28, 2014	Haleakala	Pan-STARRS 1	V	550 m	MPC · JPL
695953	2016 CR_{139}	—	October 8, 2007	Mount Lemmon	Mount Lemmon Survey	·	3.0 km	MPC · JPL
695954	2016 CT_{145}	—	October 1, 2003	Kitt Peak	Spacewatch	·	1.7 km	MPC · JPL
695955	2016 CD_{146}	—	February 25, 2011	Mount Lemmon	Mount Lemmon Survey	·	1.7 km	MPC · JPL
695956	2016 CP_{146}	—	October 24, 2003	Kitt Peak	Spacewatch	·	1.8 km	MPC · JPL
695957	2016 CJ_{147}	—	February 20, 2009	Kitt Peak	Spacewatch	·	990 m	MPC · JPL
695958	2016 CM_{148}	—	November 23, 2003	Kitt Peak	Deep Ecliptic Survey	MAS	600 m	MPC · JPL
695959	2016 CP_{151}	—	January 3, 2016	Haleakala	Pan-STARRS 1	·	770 m	MPC · JPL
695960	2016 CC_{152}	—	May 24, 2006	Kitt Peak	Spacewatch	·	2.5 km	MPC · JPL
695961	2016 CF_{154}	—	February 1, 2009	Kitt Peak	Spacewatch	·	960 m	MPC · JPL
695962	2016 CC_{157}	—	September 29, 2010	Mount Lemmon	Mount Lemmon Survey	·	910 m	MPC · JPL
695963	2016 CS_{157}	—	November 25, 2011	Haleakala	Pan-STARRS 1	·	960 m	MPC · JPL
695964	2016 CV_{157}	—	May 1, 2011	Haleakala	Pan-STARRS 1	·	3.5 km	MPC · JPL
695965	2016 CS_{158}	—	November 24, 2011	Mount Lemmon	Mount Lemmon Survey	·	720 m	MPC · JPL
695966	2016 CA_{160}	—	November 17, 2014	Haleakala	Pan-STARRS 1	·	2.3 km	MPC · JPL
695967	2016 CE_{161}	—	November 20, 2014	Mount Lemmon	Mount Lemmon Survey	·	3.4 km	MPC · JPL
695968	2016 CF_{161}	—	September 7, 2014	Haleakala	Pan-STARRS 1	·	2.4 km	MPC · JPL
695969	2016 CY_{163}	—	March 24, 2006	Kitt Peak	Spacewatch	THM	2.3 km	MPC · JPL
695970	2016 CZ_{168}	—	July 6, 2014	Haleakala	Pan-STARRS 1	·	1.0 km	MPC · JPL
695971	2016 CR_{172}	—	January 15, 2016	Haleakala	Pan-STARRS 1	MAS	530 m	MPC · JPL
695972	2016 CT_{179}	—	September 23, 2008	Mount Lemmon	Mount Lemmon Survey	EOS	1.6 km	MPC · JPL
695973	2016 CR_{182}	—	March 1, 2011	Mount Lemmon	Mount Lemmon Survey	·	2.8 km	MPC · JPL
695974	2016 CD_{183}	—	December 8, 2015	Haleakala	Pan-STARRS 1	PHO	640 m	MPC · JPL
695975	2016 CQ_{183}	—	August 15, 2013	Haleakala	Pan-STARRS 1	·	1.9 km	MPC · JPL
695976	2016 CH_{190}	—	September 16, 2003	Kitt Peak	Spacewatch	·	1.6 km	MPC · JPL
695977	2016 CQ_{190}	—	October 30, 2011	Kitt Peak	Spacewatch	MAS	500 m	MPC · JPL
695978	2016 CX_{190}	—	October 29, 2005	Kitt Peak	Spacewatch	AGN	1.0 km	MPC · JPL
695979	2016 CO_{191}	—	December 2, 2011	ESA OGS	ESA OGS	NYS	770 m	MPC · JPL
695980	2016 CC_{192}	—	September 12, 2004	Kitt Peak	Spacewatch	·	2.2 km	MPC · JPL
695981	2016 CD_{192}	—	February 27, 2009	Kitt Peak	Spacewatch	·	800 m	MPC · JPL
695982	2016 CD_{195}	—	February 10, 2016	Haleakala	Pan-STARRS 1	H	390 m	MPC · JPL
695983	2016 CS_{196}	—	February 9, 2016	Mount Lemmon	Mount Lemmon Survey	·	610 m	MPC · JPL
695984	2016 CB_{197}	—	February 14, 2005	Kitt Peak	Spacewatch	·	2.2 km	MPC · JPL
695985	2016 CA_{198}	—	May 1, 2011	Haleakala	Pan-STARRS 1	·	2.8 km	MPC · JPL
695986	2016 CS_{199}	—	May 24, 2006	Kitt Peak	Spacewatch	·	2.9 km	MPC · JPL
695987	2016 CW_{200}	—	February 2, 2005	Kitt Peak	Spacewatch	EOS	1.8 km	MPC · JPL
695988	2016 CX_{200}	—	January 26, 2012	Mount Lemmon	Mount Lemmon Survey	·	880 m	MPC · JPL
695989	2016 CB_{202}	—	January 18, 2005	Kitt Peak	Spacewatch	·	980 m	MPC · JPL
695990	2016 CO_{203}	—	February 9, 2016	Haleakala	Pan-STARRS 1	·	2.2 km	MPC · JPL
695991	2016 CJ_{204}	—	August 27, 2014	Haleakala	Pan-STARRS 1	·	960 m	MPC · JPL
695992	2016 CN_{204}	—	November 21, 2014	Haleakala	Pan-STARRS 1	·	2.4 km	MPC · JPL
695993	2016 CQ_{204}	—	January 27, 2012	Mount Lemmon	Mount Lemmon Survey	MAS	570 m	MPC · JPL
695994	2016 CD_{206}	—	January 26, 2012	Haleakala	Pan-STARRS 1	MAS	520 m	MPC · JPL
695995	2016 CY_{208}	—	January 21, 2016	Mount Lemmon	Mount Lemmon Survey	·	860 m	MPC · JPL
695996	2016 CS_{209}	—	February 9, 2016	Haleakala	Pan-STARRS 1	·	2.3 km	MPC · JPL
695997	2016 CM_{210}	—	February 9, 2016	Haleakala	Pan-STARRS 1	MAS	600 m	MPC · JPL
695998	2016 CV_{210}	—	August 14, 2013	Haleakala	Pan-STARRS 1	·	3.3 km	MPC · JPL
695999	2016 CA_{213}	—	February 9, 2016	Haleakala	Pan-STARRS 1	·	2.5 km	MPC · JPL
696000	2016 CH_{213}	—	February 9, 2016	Haleakala	Pan-STARRS 1	·	920 m	MPC · JPL

back to top
