= List of named minor planets: I =

This is a partial list of named minor planets, containing all those starting with the letter I, as of 19 October 2026. It is ordered in a case-insensitive, alphabetical manner and contains a total of 479 entries. Grey minor planets have no article and redirect to the list of minor planets instead (see List of minor planets § Main index).

== I ==
- 7626 Iafe
- 604001 Iagiellonica
- 5099 Iainbanks
- 21602 Ialmenus
- 541222 Ianbaker
- 26468 Ianchan
- 826870 Iancooper
- 91007 Ianfleming
- 20386 Ianfranchi
- 17429 Ianhowarth
- 130161 Iankubik
- 7820 Ianlyon
- 249544 Ianmclean
- 15727 Ianmorison
- 33247 Iannacone
- 4652 Iannini
- 26277 Ianrees
- 28533 Iansohl
- 98 Ianthe
- 50768 Ianwessen
- 65244 Ianwong
- 181279 Iapyx
- 21062 Iasky
- 353189 Iasus
- 29561 Iatteri
- 5000 IAU
- 9432 Iba
- 3436 Ibadinov
- 375927 Ibara
- 19713 Ibaraki
- 12648 Ibarbourou
- 2423 Ibarruri
- 15452 Ibramohammed
- 5696 Ibsen
- 23931 Ibuki
- 11251 Icarion
- 1566 Icarus
- 110299 Iceland
- 33520 Ichige
- 4903 Ichikawa
- 13222 Ichikawakazuo
- 14027 Ichimoto
- 23628 Ichimura
- 5532 Ichinohe
- 19853 Ichinomiya
- 6201 Ichiroshimizu
- 27447 Ichunlin
- 7508 Icke
- 286 Iclea
- 243 Ida
- 30705 Idaios
- 6326 Idamiyoshi
- 29804 Idansharon
- 48290 Idastraus
- 35269 Idéfix
- 1403 Idelsonia
- 2759 Idomeneus
- 963 Iduberga
- 176 Iduna
- 9698 Idzerda
- 30308 Ienli
- 134402 Ieshimatoshiaki
- 8300 Iga
- 6699 Igaueno
- 219008 Igazantal
- 372626 IGEM
- 14342 Iglika
- 11963 Ignace
- 21730 Ignaciorod
- 243591 Ignacostantino
- 335668 Ignalina
- 667531 Ignasiribas
- 12939 Ignassnellen
- 8787 Ignatenko
- 296968 Ignatianum
- 3562 Ignatius
- 6148 Ignazgünther
- 622467 Ignés
- 13482 Igorfedorov
- 564780 Igorkarachentsev
- 130229 Igorlazbin
- 10004 Igormakarov
- 269390 Igortkachenko
- 9941 Iguanodon
- 1684 Iguassú
- 5561 Iguchi
- 20387 Iharkacsillik
- 325368 Ihorhuk
- 20388 Ihorkyrylenko
- 16261 Iidemachi
- 8730 Iidesan
- 44013 Iidetenmondai
- 15821 Iijimatatsushi
- 120741 Iijimayuichi
- 2820 Iisalmi
- 8272 Iitatemura
- 343000 Ijontichy
- 12276 IJzer
- 284984 Ikaunieks
- 21022 Ike
- 6730 Ikeda
- 17098 Ikedamai
- 6910 Ikeguchi
- 12564 Ikeller
- 6661 Ikemura
- 4945 Ikenozenni
- 375303 Ikerjiménez
- 7134 Ikeuchisatoru
- 4037 Ikeya
- 12078 Ikezi
- 2828 Iku-Turso
- 6245 Ikufumi
- 13407 Ikukomakino
- 17509 Ikumadan
- 29420 Ikuo
- 7178 Ikuookamoto
- 10058 Ikwilliamson
- 51828 Ilanramon
- 108952 Ilariacinelli
- 20194 Ilarialocantore
- 88371 Ilariamazzanti
- 9077 Ildo
- 3668 Ilfpetrov
- 6604 Ilias
- 130072 Ilincaignat
- 3622 Ilinsky
- 5130 Ilioneus
- 2968 Iliya
- 3750 Ilizarov
- 37655 Illapa
- 191857 Illéserzsébet
- 391988 Illmárton
- 206574 Illyés
- 1160 Illyria
- 2107 Ilmari
- 385 Ilmatar
- 1182 Ilona
- 18282 Ilos
- 249 Ilse
- 919 Ilsebill
- 979 Ilsewa
- 297314 Ilterracottaio
- 9658 Imabari
- 16079 Imada
- 2989 Imago
- 8271 Imai
- 8460 Imainamahoe
- 5432 Imakiire
- 30924 Imamura
- 24841 Imatani
- 1520 Imatra
- 25256 Imbrie-Moore
- 5119 Imbrius
- 34919 Imelda
- 926 Imhilde
- 1813 Imhotep
- 20389 Imkedepater
- 22497 Immanuelfuchs
- 2373 Immo
- 210425 Imogene
- 15718 Imokawa
- 1320 Impala
- 1200 Imperatrix
- 7024 Impey
- 1165 Imprinetta
- 12235 Imranakperov
- 130006 Imranaslam
- 3056 INAG
- 5824 Inagaki
- 5851 Inagawa
- 19983 Inagekiyokazu
- 1325 Inanda
- 14674 INAOE
- 1532 Inari
- 17645 Inarimori
- 3438 Inarradas
- 9516 Inasan
- 32481 Inasaridze
- 9665 Inastronoviny
- 17465 Inawashiroko
- 8275 Inca
- 71855 Incamajorca
- 767321 Inceu
- 3849 Incidentia
- 18781 Indaram
- 1602 Indiana
- 7299 Indiawadkins
- 117783 Indik
- 33382 Indranidas
- 90703 Indulgentia
- 389 Industria
- 711824 Infante
- 12938 Ingakamp
- 4875 Ingalls
- 2494 Inge
- 391 Ingeborg
- 185164 Ingeburgherz
- 321405 Ingehorst
- 5632 Ingelehmann
- 12311 Ingemyr
- 487617 Ingethiering
- 10378 Ingmarbergman
- 173108 Ingola
- 33902 Ingoldsby
- 11813 Ingorichter
- 6285 Ingram
- 12611 Ingres
- 1026 Ingrid
- 134003 Ingridgalinsky
- 294077 Ingridsteeger
- 8993 Ingstad
- 561 Ingwelde
- 1479 Inkeri
- 45595 Inman
- 848 Inna
- 3497 Innanen
- 1658 Innes
- 15318 Innsbruck
- 173 Ino
- 5484 Inoda
- 7673 Inohara
- 32270 Inokuchihiroo
- 6637 Inoue
- 7442 Inouehideo
- 10616 Inouetakeshi
- 9255 Inoutadataka
- 42478 Inozemtseva
- 10245 Inselsberg
- 88260 Insubria
- 8080 Intel
- 704 Interamnia
- 2365 Interkosmos
- 3328 Interposita
- 46701 Interrante
- 9480 Inti
- 5775 Inuyama
- 43957 Invernizzi
- 85 Io
- 2450 Ioannisiani
- 16395 Ioannpravednyj
- 39991 Iochroma
- 5222 Ioffe
- 509 Iolanda
- 50251 Iorg
- 235837 Iota
- 14360 Ipatov
- 29668 Ipf
- 4791 Iphidamas
- 112 Iphigenia
- 43706 Iphiklos
- 11395 Iphinous
- 16974 Iphthime
- 29675 Ippolitonievo
- 257533 Iquique
- 369010 Ira
- 2115 Irakli
- 124398 Iraklisimonia
- 18987 Irani
- 18091 Iranmanesh
- 13910 Iranolt
- 3728 IRAS
- 22566 Irazaitseva
- 117997 Irazú
- 25690 Iredale
- 6749 Ireentje
- 5029 Ireland
- 794 Irenaea
- 14 Irene
- 46722 Ireneadler
- 51430 Ireneclaire
- 90455 Irenehernandez
- 145174 Irenejoliotcurie
- 114735 Irenemagni
- 18180 Irenesun
- 10178 Iriki
- 606017 Irimes
- 5957 Irina
- 5083 Irinara
- 26151 Irinokaigan
- 106869 Irinyi
- 7 Iris
- 569484 Irisdement
- 83464 Irishmccalla
- 26998 Iriso
- 22999 Irizarry
- 3224 Irkutsk
- 177 Irma
- 20533 Irmabonham
- 1178 Irmela
- 591 Irmgard
- 5794 Irmina
- 773 Irmintraud
- 8891 Irokawa
- 2585 Irpedina
- 216451 Irsha
- 75569 IRSOL
- 7158 IRTF
- 14612 Irtish
- 8924 Iruma
- 5229 Irurita
- 13387 Irus
- 6825 Irvine
- 114094 Irvpatterson
- 3959 Irwin
- 325372 Irynadyachuk
- 1485 Isa
- 8000 Isaac Newton
- 613279 Isaacmiguel
- 209552 Isaacroberts
- 9778 Isabelallende
- 13114 Isabelgodin
- 27120 Isabelhawkins
- 20390 Isabelherreros
- 455739 Isabelita
- 210 Isabella
- 34130 Isabellaivy
- 11735 Isabellecohen
- 33175 Isabellegleeson
- 12903 Isabellekatz
- 207341 Isabelmartin
- 66197 Isabosc
- 14834 Isaev
- 34687 Isahaku
- 788573 Isaiah
- 31697 Isaiahoneal
- 33389 Isairisgreco
- 37586 Isakaayumi
- 5091 Isakovskij
- 78867 Isakowitz
- 11085 Isala
- 6878 Isamu
- 34231 Isanisingh
- 73819 Isaootuki
- 6338 Isaosato
- 364 Isara
- 939 Isberga
- 1271 Isergina
- 23067 Ishajain
- 34828 Ishapuri
- 7710 Ishibashi
- 5829 Ishidagoro
- 9091 Ishidatakaki
- 10179 Ishigaki
- 7354 Ishiguro
- 9971 Ishihara
- 8167 Ishii
- 9218 Ishiikazuo
- 26169 Ishikawakiyoshi
- 25693 Ishitani
- 49500 Ishitoshi
- 7842 Ishitsuka
- 8163 Ishizaki
- 4095 Ishizuchisan
- 7216 Ishkov
- 7088 Ishtar
- 48291 Isidorstraus
- 13235 Isiguroyuki
- 42 Isis
- 53818 Isispogson
- 5615 Iskander
- 1409 Isko
- 190026 Iskorosten
- 8970 Islandica
- 190 Ismene
- 6168 Isnello
- 9998 ISO
- 1947 Iso-Heikkilä
- 7187 Isobe
- 11503 Isobeken
- 4210 Isobelthompson
- 6463 Isoda
- 8251 Isogai
- 211 Isolda
- 365756 ISON
- 6501 Isonzo
- 1374 Isora
- 15861 Ispahan
- 7507 Israel
- 530721 Isscas
- 23047 Isseroff
- 30719 Isserstedt
- 10162 Issunboushi
- 183 Istria
- 11614 Istropolitana
- 1735 ITA
- 10468 Itacuruba
- 14551 Itagaki
- 9233 Itagijun
- 477 Italia
- 27086 Italicobrass
- 22370 Italocalvino
- 119602 Italodimaria
- 28193 Italosvevo
- 32400 Itaparica
- 74818 Iten
- 918 Itha
- 1151 Ithaka
- 110404 Itoemi
- 5737 Itoh
- 25143 Itokawa
- 113405 Itomori
- 110405 Itoyumi
- 222249 Itsuki
- 7852 Itsukushima
- 21540 Itthipanyanan
- 133552 Itting-Enke
- 1596 Itzigsohn
- 26713 Iusukyin
- 497 Iva
- 337166 Ivanartioukhov
- 22901 Ivanbella
- 29345 Ivandanilov
- 20654 Ivaneder
- 39802 Ivanhlinka
- 150316 Ivaniosifovich
- 8573 Ivanka
- 69159 Ivanking
- 33129 Ivankrasko
- 25553 Ivanlafer
- 170073 Ivanlinscott
- 95008 Ivanobertini
- 35346 Ivanoferri
- 32938 Ivanopaci
- 4365 Ivanova
- 11802 Ivanovski
- 18814 Ivanovsky
- 30053 Ivanpaskov
- 226858 Ivanpuluj
- 263349 Ivanslyota
- 20391 Ivantsov
- 8332 Ivantsvetaev
- 1627 Ivar
- 16135 Ivarsson
- 12978 Ivashov
- 5991 Ivavladis
- 13633 Ivens
- 202930 Ivezić
- 9814 Ivobenko
- 29738 Ivobudil
- 12032 Ivory
- 126780 Ivovasiljev
- 34003 Ivozell
- 21035 Iwabu
- 40774 Iwaigame
- 4712 Iwaizumi
- 10304 Iwaki
- 11092 Iwakisan
- 5623 Iwamori
- 4951 Iwamoto
- 67853 Iwamura
- 58600 Iwamuroonsen
- 3634 Iwan
- 24808 Iwanaguchi
- 10805 Iwano
- 198820 Iwanowska
- 8406 Iwaokusano
- 7122 Iwasaki
- 19691 Iwate
- 11109 Iwatesan
- 52601 Iwayaji
- 28978 Ixion
- 58664 IYAMMIX
- 6413 Iye
- 29610 Iyengar
- 7452 Izabelyuria
- 10209 Izanaki
- 10227 Izanami
- 5584 Izenberg
- 71783 Izeryna
- 5765 Izett
- 10563 Izhdubar
- 28932 Izidoro
- 1546 Izsák
- 4157 Izu
- 6089 Izumi
- 52261 Izumishikibu
- 3418 Izvekov
- 196000 Izzard
back to top

== See also ==
- List of minor planet discoverers
- List of observatory codes
- Meanings of minor planet names § Index
