= Princetonia =

Princetonia may refer to:

- 508 Princetonia, large asteroid/minor planet
- Princetonia (plant), a fossil angiosperm genus of uncertain affiliation discovered in 1987
- Princetonia (mammal), a fossil Arctocyonidae mammal genus discovered in 1989
