= Mabella =

Mabella may refer to:

- 510 Mabella, minor planet
- Mabella (brachiopod), genus of brachiopod
- Mabella, Sierra Leone, inhabited place in Sierra Leone
