= Dugan (crater) =

Crater on the Moon

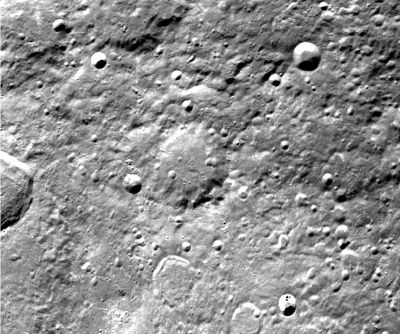
- Clementine image of Dugan (center)
- Coordinates: 64.2°N 103.3°E
- Diameter: 49.65 km (30.85 mi)
- Depth: Unknown
- Colongitude: 261° at sunrise
- Eponym: Raymond S. Dugan

Dugan is a lunar impact crater that is located on the northern part of the Moon's far side. It lies to the southwest of a large walled plain designated Schwarzschild, and due north of the crater Compton. To the west is the Belʹkovich walled plain.

This is a heavily worn and eroded crater with an outer wall that forms an irregular ring of peaks and valleys surrounding the relatively featureless interior floor. The crater is now little more than a circular depression in the rugged lunar terrain. The crater features have a softened appearance, possibly due to overlying ejecta from the much larger Schwarzschild and Compton impacts.

This formation is named after American astronomer Raymond Smith Dugan (1878-1940). Its designation was officially adopted by the International Astronomical Union in 1970.

== Satellite craters ==
By convention these features are identified on lunar maps by placing the letter on the side of the crater midpoint that is closest to Dugan.

Dugan	Latitude	Longitude	Diameter
J	61.6° N	108.0° E	13 km
X	67.8° N	98.5° E	14 km

At the base of the north-facing inner wall of Dugan J is a small area of permanent shadow.
