= 533 Sara =

Main-belt asteroid

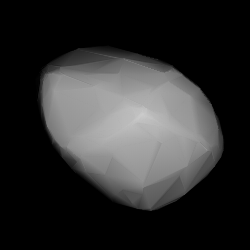
- Modelled shape of Sara from its lightcurve

Discovery
- Discovered by: Raymond Smith Dugan
- Discovery site: Heidelberg
- Discovery date: 19 April 1904

Designations
- Alternative designations: 1904 NZ

Orbital characteristics
- Epoch 31 July 2016 (JD 2457600.5)
- Uncertainty parameter 0
- Observation arc: 114.43 yr (41794 d)
- Aphelion: 3.1166 AU (466.24 Gm)
- Perihelion: 2.8421 AU (425.17 Gm)
- Semi-major axis: 2.9794 AU (445.71 Gm)
- Eccentricity: 0.046070
- Orbital period (sidereal): 5.14 yr (1878.4 d)
- Mean anomaly: 290.755°
- Mean motion: 0° 11^{m} 29.94^{s} / day
- Inclination: 6.5586°
- Longitude of ascending node: 180.352°
- Argument of perihelion: 35.265°

Physical characteristics
- Mean radius: 15.54±0.8 km
- Synodic rotation period: 11.654 h (0.4856 d)
- Geometric albedo: 0.2479±0.028
- Absolute magnitude (H): 9.7

533 Sara is a minor planet orbiting the Sun.
