= 535 Montague =

Main-belt asteroid

Discovery
- Discovered by: Raymond Smith Dugan
- Discovery site: Heidelberg
- Discovery date: 7 May 1904

Designations
- Pronunciation: /ˈmɒntəɡjuː/ MON-tə-ghew
- Alternative designations: 1904 OC

Orbital characteristics
- Epoch 31 July 2016 (JD 2457600.5)
- Uncertainty parameter 0
- Observation arc: 111.95 yr (40889 d)
- Aphelion: 2.6316 AU (393.68 Gm)
- Perihelion: 2.5073 AU (375.09 Gm)
- Semi-major axis: 2.5694 AU (384.38 Gm)
- Eccentricity: 0.024181
- Orbital period (sidereal): 4.12 yr (1504.4 d)
- Mean anomaly: 165.239°
- Mean motion: 0° 14^{m} 21.48^{s} / day
- Inclination: 6.7774°
- Longitude of ascending node: 84.813°
- Argument of perihelion: 64.514°

Physical characteristics
- Mean radius: 37.245±2.3 km
- Mass: (6.7±1.9)×10^{17} kg (Note: Calculated from its standard gravitational parameter GM = 0.045±0.013 km^{3}/s^{2}.)
- Mean density: 2.60 g/cm^{3} (Note: Assuming a diameter of 79.3 km.)
- Synodic rotation period: 10.248 h 10.2482 h (0.42701 d)
- Geometric albedo: 0.0514±0.007
- Absolute magnitude (H): 9.4

535 Montague is a minor planet orbiting the Sun that was discovered by Raymond Smith Dugan on 7 May 1904 in Heidelberg, Germany. It was named after the town Montague in Massachusetts.

Photometric observations of this asteroid give a light curve with a period of 10.248 hours.
