= 516 Amherstia =

Main-belt asteroid

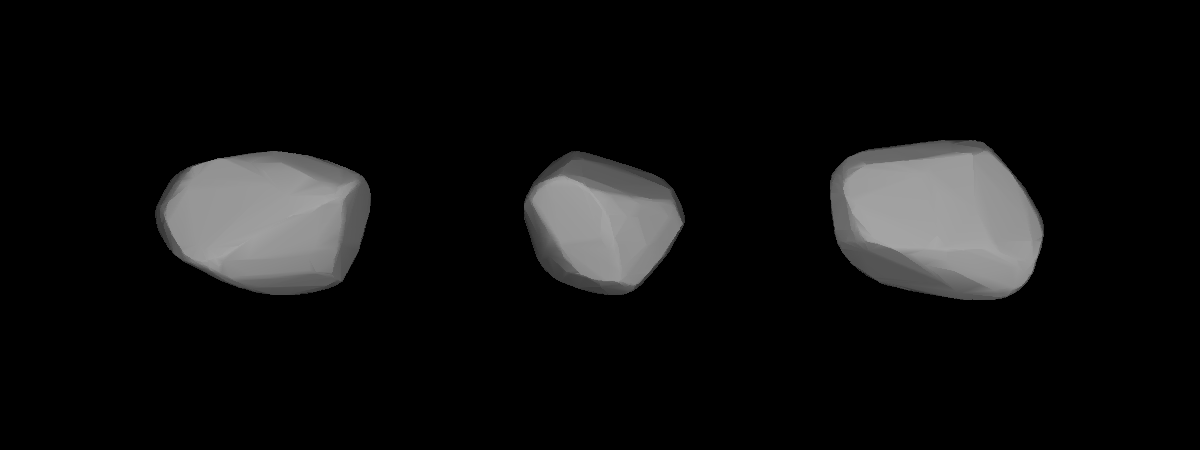
- A three-dimensional model of 516 Amherstia based on its light curve

Discovery
- Discovered by: Raymond Smith Dugan
- Discovery date: 20 September 1903

Designations
- Named after: Amherst College
- Alternative designations: 1903 MG; 1938 YO
- Minor planet category: Main belt

Orbital characteristics
- Epoch 31 July 2016 (JD 2457600.5)
- Uncertainty parameter 0
- Observation arc: 112.26 yr (41003 d)
- Aphelion: 3.4103 AU (510.17 Gm)
- Perihelion: 1.95161 AU (291.957 Gm)
- Semi-major axis: 2.68094 AU (401.063 Gm)
- Eccentricity: 0.27204
- Orbital period (sidereal): 4.39 yr (1,603.4 d)
- Mean anomaly: 26.3259°
- Mean motion: 0° 13^{m} 28.308^{s} / day
- Inclination: 12.960°
- Longitude of ascending node: 328.839°
- Argument of perihelion: 257.966°

Physical characteristics
- Mean diameter: 65.144±0.380 km 41.9±3.3 km
- Mass: (4.7 ± 2.04/1.46)×10^{17} kg (3.6±1.5)×10^{17} kg (Note: Calculated from its standard gravitational parameter GM = 0.024±0.010 km^{3}/s^{2}.)
- Mean density: 3.246 ± 1.408/1.011 g/cm^{3} 2.45 g/cm^{3} (Note: Assuming a diameter of 65.1 km.)
- Synodic rotation period: 0.312 d 7.4842 h (0.31184 d)
- Geometric albedo: 0.163–0.173; 0.202±0.015
- Spectral type: M-type asteroid
- Absolute magnitude (H): 8.40

516 Amherstia was the 8th asteroid discovered by Raymond Smith Dugan, and was named after Amherst College, his alma mater. Amherstia is a large M-type main belt asteroid, with an estimated diameter of 73 km. It follows an eccentric orbit between Jupiter and Mars, with an orbital period of 4.39 years. The orbital plane is inclined at an angle of 13° to the ecliptic.

In 1989, the asteroid was observed from the Collurania-Teramo Observatory, allowing a light curve to be produced that showed an estimated rotation period of 7.49 hours and a brightness variation of 0.25 ± 0.01 in magnitude. On January 14, 2002, Amherstia was observed to occult the seventh-magnitude star SAO 60107 from ten sites in Florida. The measured timing chords were used to estimate a cross-section diameter of 41.9±3.3 km with a generally circular profile. The near infrared spectra of Amherstia suggests a surface consisting of a single mafic silicate with iron–nickel alloy. The infrared albedo is 16%.
