= 497 Iva =

Main-belt asteroid

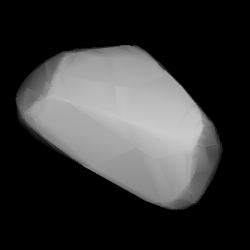
- Modelled shape of Iva from its lightcurve

Discovery
- Discovered by: Raymond Smith Dugan
- Discovery site: Heidelberg
- Discovery date: 4 November 1902

Designations
- Pronunciation: /ˈaɪvə/
- Alternative designations: 1902 KJ

Orbital characteristics
- Epoch 31 July 2016 (JD 2457600.5)
- Uncertainty parameter 0
- Observation arc: 113.45 yr (41,438 d) 113.45 yr (41438 d)
- Aphelion: 3.7065 AU (554.48 Gm)
- Perihelion: 1.9966 AU (298.69 Gm)
- Semi-major axis: 2.8516 AU (426.59 Gm)
- Eccentricity: 0.29981
- Orbital period (sidereal): 4.82 yr (1,758.8 d) 4.82 yr (1758.8 d)
- Mean anomaly: 242.202°
- Mean motion: 0° 12^{m} 16.848^{s} / day
- Inclination: 4.8205°
- Longitude of ascending node: 6.3305°
- Argument of perihelion: 3.5819°

Physical characteristics
- Synodic rotation period: 4.620 h (0.1925 d)
- Absolute magnitude (H): 10.02

497 Iva is a main-belt asteroid orbiting the Sun, not to be confused with 1627 Ivar. It was discovered by American astronomer R. S. Dugan on 4 November 1902, and was named for Iva Shores, the young daughter of the family where he was staying in Heidelberg. This object is orbiting at a distance of 2.85 AU with a period of 4.82 yr and an eccentricity of 0.3. The orbital plane is inclined at an angle of 4.8° to the plane of the ecliptic.

This asteroid is classified as an M-type asteroid and is considered anhydrous but oxidized. Further analysis of the spectra suggests the "presence of either an olivine or high-Ca pyroxene phase in addition to orthopyroxene ± Type B clinopyroxene". Analysis of light curves based on photometric data show a rotation period of 4.621±0.001 h with a brightness variation of 0.34±0.02 in magnitude.
