= 523 Ada =

Minor planet orbiting the sun

Discovery
- Discovered by: Raymond Smith Dugan
- Discovery site: Heidelberg
- Discovery date: 27 January 1904

Designations
- Alternative designations: 1904 ND

Orbital characteristics
- Epoch 31 July 2016 (JD 2457600.5)
- Uncertainty parameter 0
- Observation arc: 113.46 yr (41442 d)
- Aphelion: 3.4869 AU (521.63 Gm)
- Perihelion: 2.4517 AU (366.77 Gm)
- Semi-major axis: 2.9693 AU (444.20 Gm)
- Eccentricity: 0.17432
- Orbital period (sidereal): 5.12 yr (1868.9 d)
- Mean anomaly: 31.6678°
- Mean motion: 0° 11^{m} 33.468^{s} / day
- Inclination: 4.2955°
- Longitude of ascending node: 260.837°
- Argument of perihelion: 189.461°

Physical characteristics
- Mean radius: 15.945±0.75 km
- Synodic rotation period: 10.03 ± 0.01 hr 10.03 h (0.418 d)
- Geometric albedo: 0.2512±0.026
- Absolute magnitude (H): 9.9

523 Ada is a minor planet orbiting the Sun. It was discovered January 29, 1904, by American astronomer Raymond S. Dugan at Heidelberg, Germany and was named after his friend Ada Helme. CCD images collected during the fall of 2004 at Oakley Observatory in Terre Haute, Indiana, were used to generate a lightcurve for the object, showing a rotation period of 10.03 ± 0.01 hours.
