= Wolf Bickel =

German astronomer

Minor planets discovered: 687
see § List of discovered minor planets

Wolf Bickel (born 6 July 1942, Bensberg) is a German amateur astronomer and a prolific discoverer of asteroids, observing at his private Bergisch Gladbach Observatory, Germany. He is the most successful German discoverer of minor planets.

== Biography ==
Bickel studied electrical engineering at RWTH Aachen University and finished his studies in 1969. He became enthusiastic about astronomy, when he received a celestial chart and Galilean binoculars as a gift from his grandmother at the age of 16. Bickel began to grind parabolic mirrors to build his own telescopes. In 1995, he built a 0.6-meter aperture telescope and discovered his first minor planet, the main-belt asteroid (14053) 1995 YS_{25} the same year. He still uses this self-made telescope as of today.

He lives in Bergisch Gladbach, in the Cologne–Bonn Region of North Rhine-Westphalia, Germany. The Minor Planet Center confused Bickel's home town with the location of his observatory, which is located 30 kilometers from his place of residence. Bickel named 12564 Ikeller – an asteroid of the Koronis family, and his one and only named discovery – after his wife, Ingeborg Bickel–Keller (b. 1941).

== Honors and awards ==
The 12-kilometer sized asteroid 4324 Bickel, discovered by American astronomer Laurence Taff in 1981, was named in his honor.

== Minor planet discoveries ==
=== Official MPC discoveries ===
As of 2017, he is credited by the Minor Planet Center (MPC) with the discovery of 665 numbered minor planets during 1995–2010.

=== Comparison with German discoverers ===
In terms of total discoveries, Bickel is the most successful German discoverer of asteroids, ahead of (professional) astronomer Freimut Börngen and the first amateur astronomer to claim this honor in more than 150 years. The comparison was published by Erwin Schwab in the journal of the German astronomical society "Vereinigung der Sternfreunde" in 2013, and applies a different metric than used by the MPC.

Most prolific German discoverers of minor planets as of April 2013
#	Name	Discoveries^{(a)}	Status^{(b)}	Period	Location
1.	Wolf Bickel	539	A	1995–2010	Bergisch Gladbach, Germany
2.	Freimut Börngen	537	P	1961–1995	Tautenburg, Germany
3.	Sebastian F. Hönig	494	A	2002–2008	Palomar (USA), Punaauia (Polynesia)
4.	Karl Reinmuth	395	P	1914–1957	Heidelberg, Germany
5.	Max F. Wolf	248	P	1891–1932	Heidelberg, Germany
6.	Lutz D. Schmadel	241	P	1960–1993	Tautenburg, Germany, La Silla (Chile), Palomar (USA)
7.	August Kopff	68	P	1904–1909	Heidelberg, Germany
8.	Erwin Schwab	57	A	2006–2010	Taunus, Germany, Mayhill (USA), Moorook (Australia)
9.	Rolf Apitzsch	55	A	2004–2010	Wildberg, Germany
10.	Rainer Kling	52	A	2006–2010	Taunus, Germany
11.	Felix Hormuth	45	P	2003–2009	Calar Alto (Spain), Heppenheim and Heidelberg, Germany
12.	Hans Scholl	42	P	2003–2005	La Silla (Chile)
13.	Stefan Karge	36	A	2007–2010	Taunus, Germany, Mayhill (USA)
14.	Hans-Emil Schuster	25	P	1976–1982	La Silla (Chile)
15.	Robert Luther	24	P	1852–1890	Düsseldorf-Bilk, Germany
16.	Jens Kandler	23	A	1997–2005	Drebach, Germany
17.	Arnold Schwassmann	22	P	1898–1932	Heidelberg and Bergedorf, Germany
18.	Gerhard Lehmann	21	A	1998–2004	Drebach, Germany
18.	Franz Kaiser	21	P	1911–1914	Heidelberg, Germany
20.	Paul Götz	20	P	1903–1905	Heidelberg, Germany
21.	Hermann Goldschmidt	14	A	1852–1861	Paris (France)
22.	Josef Helffrich	13	P	1909–1911	Heidelberg, Germany
22.	André Knöfel	13	A	1998–2007	Drebach, Germany
22.	Maik Meyer	13	A	2002	Palomar (USA)
25.	Ute Zimmer	11	A	2007–2009	Taunus, Germany
26.	Walter Baade	10	P	1920–1949	Bergedorf, Germany, Palomar and Mt Wilson (USA)
Source: VdS-Journal Nr. 47, p. 82, April 2013^{a} Discoveries: co-discoveries are not considered (for the official and more recent count, see List of minor planet discoverers)^{b} Status: A = amateur astronomer; P = professional astronomer

=== List ===
This is a list of Wolf Bickel's officially discovered (numbered) minor planets, as credited by the Minor Planet Center.

12564 Ikeller	22 September 1998	list
(13252) 1998 ON_{1}	18 July 1998	list
(14053) 1995 YS_{25}	27 December 1995	list
(14106) 1997 UO_{24}	27 October 1997	list
(15114) 2000 CY_{101}	12 February 2000	list
(21420) 1998 FL_{74}	21 March 1998	list
(25149) 1998 SM_{49}	22 September 1998	list
(25386) 1999 UE_{3}	17 October 1999	list
(25759) 2000 BH_{30}	25 January 2000	list
(26968) 1997 RB_{9}	10 September 1997	list
(29899) 1999 HU_{1}	20 April 1999	list
(32160) 2000 MT_{2}	27 June 2000	list
(33130) 1998 CR_{1}	1 February 1998	list
(34596) 2000 TB_{34}	4 October 2000	list
(36562) 2000 QV_{109}	26 August 2000	list
(38462) 1999 TL_{21}	12 October 1999	list
(40405) 1999 OU	17 July 1999	list
(49006) 1998 QL_{63}	31 August 1998	list
(51321) 2000 LL_{1}	1 June 2000	list
(53165) 1999 CX_{9}	12 February 1999	list
(55134) 2001 QM_{183}	25 August 2001	list
(55135) 2001 QP_{183}	28 August 2001	list
(55935) 1998 FO_{74}	24 March 1998	list
(58783) 1998 FN_{74}	21 March 1998	list
(58949) 1998 QK_{63}	30 August 1998	list

(61338) 2000 PK	1 August 2000	list
(61345) 2000 PU_{5}	3 August 2000	list
(61405) 2000 QT_{9}	24 August 2000	list
(63259) 2001 BS_{81}	30 January 2001	list
(63512) 2001 OZ_{95}	29 July 2001	list
(63544) 2001 PD_{47}	13 August 2001	list
(63770) 2001 QM_{293}	25 August 2001	list
(64297) 2001 UD_{14}	17 October 2001	list
(64722) 2001 XJ_{105}	9 December 2001	list
(64788) 2001 XL_{201}	14 December 2001	list
(65810) 1996 RL_{26}	5 September 1996	list
(65854) 1997 EH_{46}	7 March 1997	list
(68797) 2002 GG_{10}	4 April 2002	list
(70206) 1999 RT_{31}	5 September 1999	list
(70726) 1999 VS_{2}	1 November 1999	list
(70777) 1999 VG_{40}	15 November 1999	list
(71814) 2000 UU_{2}	22 October 2000	list
(73295) 2002 JM_{67}	8 May 2002	list
(73542) 2003 OJ_{23}	29 July 2003	list
(73946) 1997 SD_{32}	24 September 1997	list
(74097) 1998 QX_{15}	17 August 1998	list
(74600) 1999 RH_{3}	2 September 1999	list
(77742) 2001 OW_{95}	27 July 2001	list
(77930) 2002 GR_{10}	8 April 2002	list
(79679) 1998 SK_{49}	20 September 1998	list

(81684) 2000 JJ_{7}	6 May 2000	list
(82600) 2001 OU_{95}	25 July 2001	list
(82601) 2001 OC_{96}	29 July 2001	list
(82714) 2001 PE_{47}	13 August 2001	list
(84795) 2002 XO_{89}	9 December 2002	list
(85969) 1999 GP_{2}	8 April 1999	list
(88534) 2001 QG_{183}	22 August 2001	list
(88535) 2001 QR_{183}	28 August 2001	list
(89057) 2001 TK_{127}	12 October 2001	list
(91391) 1999 KQ_{5}	16 May 1999	list
(91552) 1999 RG_{213}	8 September 1999	list
(92542) 2000 OW_{21}	31 July 2000	list
(94463) 2001 TH_{127}	12 October 2001	list
(100599) 1997 QV_{4}	31 August 1997	list
(100602) 1997 RD_{9}	10 September 1997	list
(100635) 1997 UQ_{24}	30 October 1997	list
(100789) 1998 FK_{74}	21 March 1998	list
(100790) 1998 FQ_{74}	24 March 1998	list
(101025) 1998 QJ_{63}	30 August 1998	list
(102235) 1999 TN_{21}	13 October 1999	list
(104642) 2000 GO_{122}	6 April 2000	list
(105094) 2000 LK_{1}	1 June 2000	list
(105095) 2000 LQ_{1}	1 June 2000	list
(105223) 2000 PJ	1 August 2000	list
(105228) 2000 PW_{5}	4 August 2000	list

(105676) 2000 SM_{43}	23 September 2000	list
(105677) 2000 SN_{43}	23 September 2000	list
(106173) 2000 UX_{2}	22 October 2000	list
(108369) 2001 KZ_{17}	20 May 2001	list
(108856) 2001 OT_{95}	25 July 2001	list
(108857) 2001 OV_{95}	25 July 2001	list
(109618) 2001 QN_{293}	25 August 2001	list
(112760) 2002 PD_{140}	13 August 2002	list
(112761) 2002 PF_{140}	14 August 2002	list
(112762) 2002 PN_{140}	15 August 2002	list
(112817) 2002 QR_{5}	16 August 2002	list
(114992) 2003 QG_{70}	20 August 2003	list
(114993) 2003 QK_{70}	24 August 2003	list
(115852) 2003 UX_{269}	24 October 2003	list
(117005) 2004 HU_{60}	25 April 2004	list
(117069) 2004 KV_{12}	17 May 2004	list
(117510) 2005 CE_{40}	5 February 2005	list
(118356) 1999 EM_{3}	12 March 1999	list
(119147) 2001 PF_{47}	14 August 2001	list
(119569) 2001 VD_{82}	10 November 2001	list
(120727) 1997 SF_{32}	27 September 1997	list
(122312) 2000 QU_{9}	24 August 2000	list
(122729) 2000 SL_{43}	22 September 2000	list
(123181) 2000 UW_{2}	22 October 2000	list
(123607) 2000 YA_{12}	21 December 2000	list

(123766) 2001 AH_{48}	15 January 2001	list
(124206) 2001 OX_{95}	27 July 2001	list
(125880) 2001 XF_{201}	9 December 2001	list
(127738) 2003 FH_{8}	21 March 2003	list
(128004) 2003 HY_{53}	23 April 2003	list
(128101) 2003 PG_{11}	5 August 2003	list
(128176) 2003 RB_{10}	1 September 2003	list
(128469) 2004 OH_{12}	28 July 2004	list
(128623) 2004 RP_{2}	5 September 2004	list
(128903) 2004 TV_{20}	10 October 2004	list
(129275) 2005 RJ_{4}	4 September 2005	list
(129578) 1997 RM_{10}	10 September 1997	list
(129592) 1997 UP_{24}	30 October 1997	list
(129593) 1997 UZ_{24}	27 October 1997	list
(129802) 1999 KP_{5}	16 May 1999	list
(130225) 2000 BW_{10}	25 January 2000	list
(131685) 2001 XH_{201}	10 December 2001	list
(132115) 2002 CL_{225}	15 February 2002	list
(132694) 2002 NH_{34}	11 July 2002	list
(133049) 2003 DU_{7}	24 February 2003	list
(133452) 2003 SJ_{224}	25 September 2003	list
(133727) 2003 UD_{270}	28 October 2003	list
(133903) 2004 RH_{85}	7 September 2004	list
(136259) 2003 YH_{45}	17 December 2003	list
(137465) 1999 UG_{3}	19 October 1999	list

(138929) 2001 BU_{1}	16 January 2001	list
(139509) 2001 PC_{47}	13 August 2001	list
(139510) 2001 PG_{47}	14 August 2001	list
(139655) 2001 QD_{183}	22 August 2001	list
(140458) 2001 TF_{127}	11 October 2001	list
(140874) 2001 VL_{17}	9 November 2001	list
(141559) 2002 GQ_{76}	7 April 2002	list
(141992) 2002 PA_{140}	13 August 2002	list
(141993) 2002 PQ_{140}	15 August 2002	list
(143633) 2003 HX_{53}	22 April 2003	list
(145435) 2005 QU_{87}	27 August 2005	list
(146292) 2001 HZ_{13}	21 April 2001	list
(146834) 2002 AY_{31}	4 January 2002	list
(149882) 2005 RM_{4}	6 September 2005	list
(150631) 2001 AK_{48}	15 January 2001	list
(151744) 2003 CA_{22}	11 February 2003	list
(152024) 2004 MZ_{6}	24 June 2004	list
(152296) 2005 TE_{47}	3 October 2005	list
(153247) 2001 BT_{1}	16 January 2001	list
(154412) 2003 AX_{82}	8 January 2003	list
(154816) 2004 QR_{7}	22 August 2004	list
(154907) 2004 RE_{316}	15 September 2004	list
(155517) 1999 RH_{213}	12 September 1999	list
(156607) 2002 GE_{91}	8 April 2002	list
(156979) 2003 JB_{13}	5 May 2003	list

(158620) 2003 AU_{82}	7 January 2003	list
(158900) 2004 QT_{7}	22 August 2004	list
(159732) 2003 DP_{22}	24 February 2003	list
(162180) 1999 KR_{5}	20 May 1999	list
(162592) 2000 SO_{43}	24 September 2000	list
(164804) 1999 JL_{75}	9 May 1999	list
(164869) 1999 UJ_{11}	31 October 1999	list
(165657) 2001 KA_{18}	20 May 2001	list
(166711) 2002 TL_{200}	10 October 2002	list
(167672) 2004 FM_{29}	24 March 2004	list
(167793) 2005 AO_{45}	14 January 2005	list
(168164) 2006 HV_{60}	27 April 2006	list
(168697) 2000 GQ_{122}	6 April 2000	list
(169156) 2001 QS_{183}	28 August 2001	list
(169416) 2001 XM_{201}	14 December 2001	list
(169730) 2002 NW_{46}	11 July 2002	list
(169740) 2002 OC_{5}	16 July 2002	list
(169982) 2002 TF_{200}	9 October 2002	list
(171432) 2007 RK_{19}	5 September 2007	list
(171569) 1999 UD_{3}	16 October 1999	list
(172058) 2001 XN_{201}	14 December 2001	list
(172893) 2005 GE_{9}	2 April 2005	list
(173074) 2006 TU_{60}	14 October 2006	list
(175024) 2004 FU_{29}	27 March 2004	list
(175134) 2005 CM_{56}	7 February 2005	list

(175342) 2005 NS_{80}	12 July 2005	list
(175787) 1999 QL	17 August 1999	list
(175969) 2000 LQ_{22}	7 June 2000	list
(177179) 2003 SF_{224}	25 September 2003	list
(177535) 2004 FV_{29}	27 March 2004	list
(177601) 2004 GN_{73}	14 April 2004	list
(178264) 2007 YU_{2}	16 December 2007	list
(178380) 1997 KM_{4}	28 May 1997	list
(179536) 2002 CG_{225}	14 February 2002	list
(181018) 2005 NU_{80}	12 July 2005	list
(181826) 1998 SP_{49}	22 September 1998	list
(181878) 1999 OT	17 July 1999	list
(182375) 2001 QJ_{183}	22 August 2001	list
(183028) 2002 PC_{140}	13 August 2002	list
(183440) 2003 AW_{82}	8 January 2003	list
(184270) 2004 XU_{41}	9 December 2004	list
(184624) 2005 RT_{29}	7 September 2005	list
(187476) 2006 BB_{213}	30 January 2006	list
(187493) 2006 SQ_{275}	28 September 2006	list
(187674) 2008 CZ_{74}	10 February 2008	list
(188464) 2004 JB_{45}	15 May 2004	list
(189231) 2004 LW_{23}	14 June 2004	list
(191138) 2002 GX_{70}	8 April 2002	list
(191320) 2003 JZ_{12}	4 May 2003	list
(191590) 2004 FN_{29}	24 March 2004	list

(191850) 2004 VV_{54}	7 November 2004	list
(192772) 1999 UH_{11}	31 October 1999	list
(193215) 2000 QG_{232}	31 August 2000	list
(193924) 2001 QR_{293}	28 August 2001	list
(194858) 2002 AB_{32}	10 January 2002	list
(195160) 2002 CE_{225}	14 February 2002	list
(195390) 2002 GJ_{10}	5 April 2002	list
(196810) 2003 SC_{224}	24 September 2003	list
(198481) 2004 XV_{41}	9 December 2004	list
(199651) 2006 GV_{31}	6 April 2006	list
(199901) 2007 GG_{5}	12 April 2007	list
(200233) 1999 VV_{2}	4 November 1999	list
(201013) 2002 CJ_{225}	15 February 2002	list
(201557) 2003 RC_{26}	3 September 2003	list
(202037) 2004 RL_{85}	9 September 2004	list
(202213) 2004 XQ_{121}	15 December 2004	list
(202402) 2005 JO_{108}	10 May 2005	list
(202802) 2008 RE_{79}	9 September 2008	list
(202864) 2008 UY_{3}	23 October 2008	list
(203195) 2001 CH_{42}	14 February 2001	list
(204342) 2004 RB_{316}	7 September 2004	list
(204619) 2005 LB_{37}	13 June 2005	list
(205074) 1999 RL_{213}	13 September 1999	list
(205216) 2000 MU_{2}	27 June 2000	list
(205624) 2001 VN_{17}	9 November 2001	list

(205889) 2002 GF_{10}	1 April 2002	list
(206388) 2003 RF_{26}	3 September 2003	list
(206958) 2004 SU_{2}	17 September 2004	list
(207409) 2006 BD_{213}	30 January 2006	list
(207758) 2007 SN_{19}	23 September 2007	list
(208154) 2000 GS_{122}	8 April 2000	list
(208749) 2002 OD_{5}	16 July 2002	list
(208905) 2002 TJ_{200}	9 October 2002	list
(209360) 2004 DF_{53}	19 February 2004	list
(209407) 2004 FA_{4}	17 March 2004	list
(209512) 2004 RO_{2}	5 September 2004	list
(209662) 2005 CC_{40}	4 February 2005	list
(210291) 2007 TE_{72}	14 October 2007	list
(212638) 2006 UE_{2}	16 October 2006	list
(212917) 2007 YR	16 December 2007	list
(213430) 2001 XP_{201}	14 December 2001	list
(214259) 2005 GO_{8}	1 April 2005	list
(214444) 2005 RH_{4}	4 September 2005	list
(214511) 2006 BA_{213}	29 January 2006	list
(214775) 2006 UL_{71}	16 October 2006	list
(215247) 2001 KY_{17}	20 May 2001	list
(215739) 2004 DL_{53}	23 February 2004	list
(216004) 2005 TK_{103}	8 October 2005	list
(216184) 2006 TT_{60}	14 October 2006	list
(216443) 2009 FS_{20}	18 March 2009	list

(218075) 2002 GY_{70}	8 April 2002	list
(218376) 2004 JA_{45}	15 May 2004	list
(218629) 2005 RN_{4}	6 September 2005	list
(219137) 1998 WO_{8}	21 November 1998	list
(219664) 2001 VM_{17}	9 November 2001	list
(220297) 2003 CA_{21}	10 February 2003	list
(220589) 2004 KZ_{12}	20 May 2004	list
(220890) 2004 XL_{129}	14 December 2004	list
(221001) 2005 NE_{83}	12 July 2005	list
(221162) 2005 TZ_{107}	7 October 2005	list
(223659) 2004 PM_{26}	8 August 2004	list
(224274) 2005 TK_{51}	11 October 2005	list
(224275) 2005 TU_{51}	12 October 2005	list
(225674) 2001 OA_{96}	29 July 2001	list
(225806) 2001 VC_{82}	9 November 2001	list
(225983) 2002 CH_{225}	15 February 2002	list
(226422) 2003 RE_{10}	2 September 2003	list
(226996) 2004 XS_{74}	9 December 2004	list
(228086) 2008 RX_{78}	9 September 2008	list
(228889) 2003 QH_{70}	22 August 2003	list
(229096) 2004 QQ_{7}	22 August 2004	list
(229357) 2005 QW_{87}	28 August 2005	list
(229642) 2006 FU_{20}	24 March 2006	list
(229792) 2008 RD_{79}	9 September 2008	list
(229860) 2009 TA_{12}	14 October 2009	list

(229975) 1999 VC_{40}	12 November 1999	list
(231468) 2007 PT_{26}	11 August 2007	list
(231732) 1999 GD_{7}	15 April 1999	list
(232580) 2003 SZ_{356}	18 September 2003	list
(233785) 2008 UA_{4}	23 October 2008	list
(233910) 2009 FJ_{20}	17 March 2009	list
(235566) 2004 GP_{73}	14 April 2004	list
(235618) 2004 QU_{7}	22 August 2004	list
(235620) 2004 RQ_{2}	5 September 2004	list
(235680) 2004 RD_{316}	8 September 2004	list
(235996) 2005 GF_{9}	2 April 2005	list
(236056) 2005 JK_{23}	2 May 2005	list
(236475) 2006 FT_{20}	24 March 2006	list
(236861) 2007 RC_{188}	8 September 2007	list
(237177) 2008 UZ_{160}	24 October 2008	list
(237300) 2008 YA_{34}	27 December 2008	list
(237596) 2001 KH_{33}	23 May 2001	list
(238114) 2003 MX	21 June 2003	list
(239202) 2006 OX	19 July 2006	list
(239306) 2007 QH_{2}	18 August 2007	list
(240108) 2002 CD_{225}	14 February 2002	list
(241012) 2006 OQ_{14}	24 July 2006	list
(241194) 2007 SX_{10}	21 September 2007	list
(241791) 2001 PB_{51}	15 August 2001	list
(241967) 2002 GO_{10}	8 April 2002	list

(242418) 2004 GV_{73}	11 April 2004	list
(244684) 2003 OH_{23}	28 July 2003	list
(244803) 2003 SJ_{269}	20 September 2003	list
(245451) 2005 LV	1 June 2005	list
(246249) 2007 TV_{3}	5 October 2007	list
(246661) 2008 YA_{85}	27 December 2008	list
(246808) 2009 FC_{44}	29 March 2009	list
(247730) 2003 GK_{51}	7 April 2003	list
(248098) 2004 RG_{85}	7 September 2004	list
(248342) 2005 QZ_{87}	29 August 2005	list
(248440) 2005 TN_{51}	12 October 2005	list
(249043) 2007 TA_{72}	14 October 2007	list
(250541) 2004 RR_{2}	5 September 2004	list
(251169) 2006 UF_{2}	16 October 2006	list
(251720) 1997 SE_{32}	25 September 1997	list
(252037) 2000 QW_{109}	30 August 2000	list
(252819) 2002 GE_{54}	5 April 2002	list
(253210) 2002 XQ_{89}	10 December 2002	list
(253453) 2003 RD_{26}	3 September 2003	list
(253563) 2003 SK_{269}	21 September 2003	list
(254847) 2005 RG_{4}	3 September 2005	list
(256033) 2006 UJ_{47}	16 October 2006	list
(256291) 2006 WZ_{129}	26 November 2006	list
(256456) 2007 CX_{54}	15 February 2007	list
(256569) 2007 TC_{9}	6 October 2007	list

(257118) 2008 GS_{81}	8 April 2008	list
(257139) 2008 HB_{3}	26 April 2008	list
(257249) 2009 FL_{20}	17 March 2009	list
(257608) 1999 RM_{213}	13 September 1999	list
(257609) 1999 RQ_{214}	12 September 1999	list
(257900) 2000 TZ_{33}	4 October 2000	list
(258329) 2001 VO_{17}	10 November 2001	list
(258814) 2002 NH_{28}	9 July 2002	list
(259025) 2002 TD_{200}	8 October 2002	list
(259148) 2002 XP_{89}	9 December 2002	list
(259155) 2002 XF_{115}	8 December 2002	list
(259310) 2003 FG_{8}	21 March 2003	list
(259488) 2003 SK_{224}	25 September 2003	list
(259598) 2003 UE_{270}	23 October 2003	list
(260090) 2004 KW_{17}	24 May 2004	list
(261134) 2005 TS_{47}	5 October 2005	list
(261166) 2005 TJ_{103}	8 October 2005	list
(262914) 2007 CW_{54}	15 February 2007	list
(263820) 2008 RF_{140}	8 September 2008	list
(263989) 2009 LP_{1}	12 June 2009	list
(264023) 2009 QA_{8}	19 August 2009	list
(265054) 2003 RG_{10}	3 September 2003	list
(265946) 2006 BX_{212}	30 January 2006	list
(266419) 2007 GH_{4}	9 April 2007	list
(266703) 2009 QG_{19}	18 August 2009	list

(266737) 2009 SQ_{21}	22 September 2009	list
(266771) 2009 SN_{169}	24 September 2009	list
(266819) 2009 TQ_{11}	14 October 2009	list
(266827) 2009 TS_{36}	15 October 2009	list
(267210) 2000 SA_{321}	29 September 2000	list
(268112) 2004 SW_{61}	17 September 2004	list
(269126) 2007 PP_{43}	11 August 2007	list
(269392) 2009 QX_{37}	29 August 2009	list
(269705) 1997 UR_{24}	31 October 1997	list
(270035) 2001 KF_{33}	22 May 2001	list
(270453) 2002 CK_{225}	15 February 2002	list
(270649) 2002 PM_{140}	14 August 2002	list
(271291) 2003 UA_{270}	24 October 2003	list
(272230) 2005 QX_{87}	28 August 2005	list
(273633) 2007 DW_{45}	21 February 2007	list
(273696) 2007 EK_{40}	12 March 2007	list
(274000) 2007 PF_{1}	4 August 2007	list
(274054) 2007 TA_{9}	6 October 2007	list
(274389) 2008 RS_{107}	9 September 2008	list
(274507) 2008 SP_{147}	25 September 2008	list
(274528) 2008 SH_{207}	26 September 2008	list
(274845) 2009 QB_{38}	31 August 2009	list
(274926) 2009 SU_{168}	22 September 2009	list
(274989) 2009 TS_{11}	14 October 2009	list
(275007) 2009 TW_{40}	13 October 2009	list

(275798) 2001 QL_{183}	25 August 2001	list
(276112) 2002 GP_{10}	8 April 2002	list
(276439) 2003 CB_{21}	10 February 2003	list
(276478) 2003 MK_{10}	24 June 2003	list
(276800) 2004 OJ_{12}	28 July 2004	list
(278345) 2007 JA_{3}	6 May 2007	list
(278393) 2007 PS_{26}	11 August 2007	list
(278665) 2008 RV_{78}	9 September 2008	list
(279100) 2008 YW_{30}	25 December 2008	list
(279653) 2011 FP_{4}	24 March 2004	list
(280346) 2003 SD_{224}	24 September 2003	list
(280532) 2004 RG_{15}	6 September 2004	list
(282539) 2004 RC_{316}	8 September 2004	list
(283143) 2008 YO_{34}	31 December 2008	list
(283207) 2010 HH_{79}	17 April 2010	list
(283954) 2004 QS_{7}	22 August 2004	list
(284329) 2006 RE_{12}	14 September 2006	list
(284842) 2009 BT_{81}	29 January 2009	list
(285411) 1999 VW_{2}	4 November 1999	list
(285883) 2001 OR_{95}	24 July 2001	list
(287294) 2002 TH_{200}	9 October 2002	list
(288043) 2003 UW_{269}	24 October 2003	list
(288472) 2004 FB_{4}	17 March 2004	list
(289272) 2004 XB_{147}	14 December 2004	list
(289588) 2005 FL_{5}	31 March 2005	list

(290409) 2005 TX_{47}	6 October 2005	list
(290589) 2005 UU_{157}	27 October 2005	list
(292550) 2006 TV_{60}	14 October 2006	list
(292625) 2006 UH_{18}	16 October 2006	list
(292746) 2006 UU_{174}	16 October 2006	list
(293694) 2007 PY_{38}	12 August 2007	list
(293695) 2007 PB_{39}	14 August 2007	list
(294542) 2007 YU	16 December 2007	list
(294619) 2008 AG_{31}	10 January 2008	list
(295385) 2008 JB_{3}	2 May 2008	list
(295408) 2008 JF_{21}	10 May 2008	list
(296134) 2009 BN_{81}	26 January 2009	list
(296356) 2009 FE_{23}	20 March 2009	list
(296374) 2009 FA_{44}	29 March 2009	list
(296448) 2009 HE_{59}	21 April 2009	list
(296518) 2009 LK_{5}	13 June 2009	list
(296552) 2009 QR_{7}	18 August 2009	list
(296564) 2009 QU_{37}	29 August 2009	list
(296615) 2009 SL_{21}	21 September 2009	list
(296732) 2009 TP_{11}	14 October 2009	list
(297045) 2010 HB_{20}	17 April 2010	list
(299363) 2005 TV_{47}	5 October 2005	list
(299658) 2006 OV	18 July 2006	list
(299952) 2006 TS_{60}	14 October 2006	list
(300427) 2007 TW_{8}	6 October 2007	list

(301162) 2008 YS_{34}	31 December 2008	list
(301288) 2009 BA_{110}	30 January 2009	list
(301526) 2009 FV_{28}	20 March 2009	list
(301534) 2009 FD_{44}	30 March 2009	list
(301612) 2010 DN_{34}	17 February 2010	list
(301750) 2010 HM_{105}	20 April 2010	list
(302055) 2000 UV_{2}	22 October 2000	list
(302127) 2001 QQ_{183}	28 August 2001	list
(303693) 2005 NT_{80}	12 July 2005	list
(304528) 2006 UH_{263}	31 October 2006	list
(305286) 2008 AD_{1}	1 January 2008	list
(307590) 2003 JX_{12}	3 May 2003	list
(307916) 2004 DO_{53}	23 February 2004	list
(309756) 2008 WO_{121}	29 November 2008	list
(310976) 2003 UB_{270}	27 October 2003	list
(312593) 2009 KN_{2}	18 May 2009	list
(313907) 2004 PO_{26}	9 August 2004	list
(313917) 2004 QO_{7}	22 August 2004	list
(313930) 2004 RF_{85}	7 September 2004	list
(314338) 2005 TL_{51}	11 October 2005	list
(314820) 2006 UK_{47}	16 October 2006	list
(315253) 2007 TY_{8}	6 October 2007	list
(315875) 2008 JB_{21}	9 May 2008	list
(315928) 2008 SP_{198}	25 September 2008	list
(319311) 2006 BW_{146}	28 January 2006	list

(319721) 2006 UN_{71}	16 October 2006	list
(319910) 2006 XM_{31}	15 December 2006	list
(320164) 2007 GP_{1}	8 April 2007	list
(320168) 2007 GD_{5}	12 April 2007	list
(320180) 2007 GZ_{28}	15 April 2007	list
(320257) 2007 PU_{26}	12 August 2007	list
(320515) 2007 YA_{3}	18 December 2007	list
(320631) 2008 CA_{75}	10 February 2008	list
(320949) 2008 HR_{4}	26 April 2008	list
(323298) 2003 UT_{12}	17 October 2003	list
(323638) 2004 XT_{41}	9 December 2004	list
(324758) 2007 GC_{5}	11 April 2007	list
(325357) 2008 LS_{12}	9 June 2008	list
(325435) 2009 OP_{21}	26 July 2009	list
(326785) 2003 SH_{269}	20 September 2003	list
(326976) 2004 MY_{6}	20 June 2004	list
(327771) 2006 UK_{91}	18 October 2006	list
(328507) 2009 QV_{7}	18 August 2009	list
(328517) 2009 QN_{20}	19 August 2009	list
(328522) 2009 QC_{38}	31 August 2009	list
(328832) 2009 WJ_{26}	20 November 2009	list
(328891) 2010 RQ_{52}	5 September 2010	list
(329011) 2010 XY_{76}	23 January 2007	list
(329276) 1999 VF_{40}	15 November 1999	list
(330028) 2005 UW_{157}	28 October 2005	list

(330336) 2006 UG_{263}	31 October 2006	list
(330574) 2008 CZ_{68}	7 February 2008	list
(330720) 2008 QR_{23}	30 August 2008	list
(330751) 2008 SV_{145}	21 September 2008	list
(330752) 2008 SO_{147}	25 September 2008	list
(330859) 2009 QP_{29}	23 August 2009	list
(330977) 2009 TY_{11}	14 October 2009	list
(332410) 2007 OH_{1}	17 July 2007	list
(332457) 2008 CG_{69}	8 February 2008	list
(332852) 2010 RZ_{3}	1 September 2010	list
(332887) 2011 AJ_{55}	15 March 2007	list
(332897) 2011 BB_{25}	24 January 2007	list
(334045) 2001 KX_{17}	19 May 2001	list
(334363) 2002 AZ_{31}	9 January 2002	list
(334802) 2003 SG_{224}	25 September 2003	list
(336507) 2008 WR_{121}	29 November 2008	list
(336539) 2009 BW_{9}	20 January 2009	list
(337061) 1997 RC_{9}	10 September 1997	list
(337397) 2001 QF_{183}	22 August 2001	list
(338505) 2003 PB_{12}	2 August 2003	list
(338776) 2003 UZ_{269}	24 October 2003	list
(341817) 2007 YV_{2}	17 December 2007	list
(342158) 2008 SX_{147}	26 September 2008	list
(342867) 2008 YP_{34}	31 December 2008	list
(343001) 2009 BH_{75}	21 January 2009	list

(344376) 2001 XJ_{201}	13 December 2001	list
(344749) 2003 UX_{289}	26 September 2003	list
(345736) 2007 DY_{45}	21 February 2007	list
(345877) 2007 RB_{8}	5 September 2007	list
(346402) 2008 SF_{148}	25 September 2008	list
(346403) 2008 SL_{149}	24 September 2008	list
(346675) 2008 YM_{34}	31 December 2008	list
(346676) 2008 YT_{34}	27 December 2008	list
(346687) 2008 YY_{84}	27 December 2008	list
(349450) 2008 CF_{69}	8 February 2008	list
(349605) 2008 UZ_{3}	23 October 2008	list
(349896) 2009 FB_{23}	20 March 2009	list
(349904) 2009 FZ_{43}	29 March 2009	list
(350113) 2011 QM_{9}	21 January 2009	list
(350262) 2012 TA_{186}	25 August 2003	list
(351036) 2003 SM_{157}	5 September 2003	list
(351367) 2005 CD_{40}	5 February 2005	list
(352508) 2008 CY_{74}	10 February 2008	list
(352888) 2008 YQ_{34}	31 December 2008	list
(354951) 2006 FA_{1}	19 March 2006	list
(355501) 2007 YB_{3}	18 December 2007	list
(355770) 2008 RE_{80}	11 September 2008	list
(355925) 2008 YA_{38}	27 December 2008	list
(356111) 2009 FE_{20}	17 March 2009	list
(356827) 2011 UY_{401}	23 December 2006	list

(357070) 2001 QH_{172}	14 August 2001	list
(357338) 2003 PE_{11}	1 August 2003	list
(357508) 2004 QP_{7}	22 August 2004	list
(357509) 2004 RT_{2}	5 September 2004	list
(358263) 2006 TX_{60}	15 October 2006	list
(358289) 2006 UM_{71}	16 October 2006	list
(358383) 2006 YQ_{19}	24 December 2006	list
(359056) 2008 YN_{24}	26 December 2008	list
(359058) 2008 YY_{37}	26 December 2008	list
(359251) 2009 FF_{20}	17 March 2009	list
(359943) 2011 YG_{75}	13 October 2009	list
(360841) 2005 NK_{63}	11 July 2005	list
(362071) 2009 BD_{76}	25 January 2009	list
(362098) 2009 BS_{186}	21 January 2009	list
(363114) 2001 AG_{48}	15 January 2001	list
(363618) 2004 LX_{23}	13 June 2004	list
(363848) 2005 QE_{89}	29 August 2005	list
(364773) 2007 YT	16 December 2007	list
(364834) 2008 CD_{116}	8 February 2008	list
(364968) 2008 HA_{3}	7 April 2008	list
(365408) 2010 AD_{88}	1 February 2006	list
(365696) 2010 VE_{119}	18 August 2009	list
(365972) 2012 BL_{49}	8 February 2008	list
(366225) 2012 TA_{287}	12 May 2005	list
(366275) 2013 AK_{59}	26 February 2003	list

(367663) 2009 XV_{20}	15 December 2009	list
(368115) 2013 GQ_{79}	11 December 2004	list
(368320) 2002 PE_{140}	14 August 2002	list
(368998) 2007 GB_{5}	7 April 2007	list
(369271) 2009 QU_{5}	16 August 2009	list
(370996) 2005 TM_{51}	11 October 2005	list
(372346) 2009 FA_{23}	19 March 2009	list
(372720) 2009 XU_{20}	15 December 2009	list
(374070) 2004 RH_{113}	6 September 2004	list
(374287) 2005 QT_{87}	27 August 2005	list
(374557) 2006 BU_{146}	28 January 2006	list
(375178) 2008 DR_{27}	1 April 2005	list
(375626) 2008 WP_{121}	29 November 2008	list
(375723) 2009 QM_{38}	29 August 2009	list
(375799) 2009 TO_{11}	13 October 2009	list
(376051) 2010 EK_{30}	9 March 2010	list
(376725) 1998 FP_{74}	24 March 1998	list
(377270) 2004 DC_{53}	19 February 2004	list
(377365) 2004 RJ_{113}	6 September 2004	list
(378272) 2007 EJ_{40}	12 March 2007	list
(378319) 2007 GM_{5}	14 April 2007	list
(378701) 2008 NJ_{1}	1 July 2008	list
(379124) 2009 BE_{10}	20 January 2009	list
(380143) 1999 UH_{3}	19 October 1999	list
(381149) 2007 GN_{5}	14 April 2007	list

(381198) 2007 RG_{35}	7 September 2007	list
(381716) 2009 QA_{38}	31 August 2009	list
(382344) 2013 TW_{55}	14 April 2004	list
(382452) 2000 QS_{9}	24 August 2000	list
(382847) 2004 DK_{53}	23 February 2004	list
(383607) 2007 JC_{10}	5 May 2007	list
(383920) 2008 SM_{147}	24 September 2008	list
(386224) 2007 YY_{2}	18 December 2007	list
(386546) 2009 DE_{14}	18 February 2009	list
(386583) 2009 FM_{22}	19 March 2009	list
(388223) 2006 JC_{1}	3 May 2006	list
(389522) 2010 GB_{161}	6 April 2010	list
(391557) 2007 TQ_{71}	13 October 2007	list
(391993) 2008 YB_{38}	27 December 2008	list
(393365) 1999 RK_{213}	12 September 1999	list
(393878) 2005 TC_{47}	3 October 2005	list
(394245) 2006 TW_{60}	15 October 2006	list
(395096) 2009 KY_{28}	31 May 2009	list
(395100) 2009 OQ_{21}	26 July 2009	list
(395101) 2009 OT_{21}	31 July 2009	list
(398172) 2010 HN_{23}	17 April 2010	list
(399980) 2006 BC_{213}	30 January 2006	list
(400434) 2008 DP_{8}	24 February 2008	list
(400694) 2009 QX_{58}	17 August 2009	list
(402037) 2003 SE_{224}	25 September 2003	list

(402141) 2004 RU_{2}	5 September 2004	list
(402910) 2007 TC_{72}	14 October 2007	list
(406323) 2007 PE_{1}	4 August 2007	list
(406386) 2007 SZ_{10}	21 September 2007	list
(407045) 2009 SU_{110}	18 September 2009	list
(407143) 2009 TJ_{11}	13 October 2009	list
(410049) 2007 AL_{12}	14 January 2007	list
(410247) 2007 TB_{72}	14 October 2007	list
(410612) 2008 MV_{4}	29 June 2008	list
(410779) 2009 FD_{23}	20 March 2009	list
(413225) 2003 RD_{10}	2 September 2003	list
(413941) 2006 YP_{19}	24 December 2006	list
(415703) 1997 US_{24}	31 October 1997	list
(417820) 2007 FX_{20}	24 March 2007	list
(418496) 2008 RG_{140}	8 September 2008	list
(418688) 2008 UT_{3}	22 October 2008	list
(419507) 2010 GW_{27}	5 April 2010	list
(424655) 2008 QB_{33}	31 August 2008	list
(425051) 2009 QR_{29}	23 August 2009	list
(425300) 2009 XV_{21}	15 December 2009	list
(428396) 2007 SY_{10}	21 September 2007	list
(429098) 2009 SN_{21}	22 September 2009	list
(429312) 2010 EN_{30}	10 March 2010	list
(430634) 2003 RF_{10}	3 September 2003	list
(431158) 2006 RO_{2}	11 September 2006	list

(431477) 2007 TT_{8}	6 October 2007	list
(434320) 2004 GT_{73}	15 April 2004	list
(435999) 2009 FE_{41}	21 March 2009	list
(438134) 2005 RE_{4}	3 September 2005	list
(438723) 2008 SH_{226}	27 September 2008	list
(440111) 2003 RK_{27}	5 September 2003	list
(440124) 2003 SH_{224}	25 September 2003	list
(440426) 2005 RC_{45}	8 September 2005	list
(444169) 2005 JO_{106}	12 May 2005	list
(448388) 2009 QS_{7}	18 August 2009	list
(452331) 2000 WC_{159}	24 November 2000	list
(452987) 2007 GE_{1}	6 April 2007	list
(453437) 2009 QT_{29}	23 August 2009	list
(455922) 2005 UC_{268}	27 October 2005	list
(456159) 2006 GO_{2}	2 April 2006	list
(456240) 2006 OW	18 July 2006	list
(457769) 2009 KZ_{4}	22 May 2009	list
(457798) 2009 QH_{38}	29 August 2009	list
(462104) 2007 QJ_{2}	18 August 2007	list
(462149) 2007 TP_{71}	7 October 2007	list
(464081) 2014 WJ_{301}	9 December 2002	list
(465225) 2007 RC_{139}	15 September 2007	list
(467673) 2008 UV_{160}	23 October 2008	list
(468521) 2005 UT_{157}	27 October 2005	list
(469978) 2006 FC	18 March 2006	list

(470598) 2008 OR_{13}	31 July 2008	list
(474962) 2005 TW_{47}	5 October 2005	list
(476072) 2007 TV_{8}	6 October 2007	list
(476162) 2007 TE_{374}	14 October 2007	list
(476589) 2008 SU_{11}	25 September 2008	list
(476720) 2008 UU_{3}	22 October 2008	list
(476974) 2008 YS_{31}	29 December 2008	list
(477054) 2009 BD_{10}	20 January 2009	list
(483586) 2004 FK_{115}	24 February 2004	list
(489166) 2006 FS_{20}	24 March 2006	list
(490391) 2009 Q_{7}	18 September 2009	list
(494692) 2004 PL_{26}	8 August 2004	list
(497018) 2003 GJ_{51}	6 April 2003	list
(498391) 2007 XC_{25}	15 December 2007	list
(499472) 2010 HL_{77}	19 April 2010	list
(508797) 2000 PV_{5}	3 August 2000	list
(509363) 2007 BJ_{7}	23 January 2007	list
(516605) 2007 KG_{4}	18 May 2007	list
(526478) 2006 RM_{2}	11 September 2006	list
(526965) 2007 RL_{35}	8 September 2007	list
(529081) 2009 QX_{45}	27 August 2009	list
(543067) 2013 RC_{104}	10 February 2003	list
(543080) 2013 SQ_{25}	27 September 2013	list
(543341) 2014 AT_{18}	19 April 2010	list
(543364) 2014 BX_{30}	31 July 2005	list

(543636) 2014 OB_{147}	24 September 2011	list
(544345) 2014 UM_{118}	29 August 2005	list
(544352) 2014 UQ_{125}	19 August 2009	list
(544481) 2014 VZ_{36}	5 July 2013	list
(544748) 2014 WB_{357}	6 October 2005	list
(544989) 2014 XY_{3}	5 October 2005	list
(545252) 2011 ED_{8}	2 March 2011	list
(545349) 2011 GU_{27}	2 April 2011	list
(545459) 2011 KY_{25}	23 May 2011	list
(545645) 2011 SW_{99}	18 May 2004	list
(545701) 2011 SH_{235}	27 September 2011	list
(545906) 2011 UC_{322}	31 October 2011	list
(546152) 2010 TZ_{127}	11 October 2010	list
(546249) 2010 UO_{43}	9 October 2010	list
(546349) 2010 VT_{47}	18 August 2009	list
(546930) 2010 AC_{141}	24 October 2008	list
(547529) 2010 TM_{15}	5 September 2010	list
(547606) 2010 TZ_{171}	14 October 2010	list
(547739) 2010 VQ_{74}	26 July 2009	list
(548329) 2010 GC_{106}	6 October 2007	list
(548485) 2010 LB_{134}	27 September 2006	list
(548519) 2010 QK_{1}	20 August 2010	list
(549188) 2011 EZ_{47}	7 March 2011	list
(549309) 2011 FU_{167}	30 March 2011	list
(549429) 2011 HK_{86}	24 January 2007	list

(549732) 2011 SM_{89}	31 December 2008	list
(549777) 2011 SH_{222}	24 September 2011	list
(549991) 2011 WC_{122}	18 September 2007	list
(551745) 2013 JD_{27}	24 April 2009	list
(551771) 2013 JV_{66}	13 October 2010	list
(552715) 2010 OM_{126}	18 July 2010	list
(552807) 2010 TX_{127}	11 October 2010	list
(552976) 2010 WQ_{74}	16 April 2012	list
(553170) 2011 CR_{60}	29 January 2011	list
(553392) 2011 MS_{14}	28 June 2011	list
(554524) 2012 UQ_{58}	21 September 2006	list
(554700) 2012 XX64	6 April 2010	list
(555626) 2014 BO_{40}	16 December 2007	list
(556956) 2014 SN_{179}	21 September 2010	list
(557108) 2014 SK_{365}	12 April 2004	list
(557537) 2014 VA_{28}	7 April 2007	list
(558154) 2014 XL_{31}	22 April 2007	list
(558503) 2015 AK_{246}	11 March 2007	list
(559003) 2015 BC_{343}	11 August 2012	list
(559401) 2015 CG_{64}	25 December 2008	list
(559565) 2015 DQ_{92}	10 May 2005	list
(560432) 2015 FC_{367}	31 December 2008	list
(561105) 2015 PC_{290}	30 March 2011	list
(561264) 2015 RJ_{214}	10 September 2015	list
(561671) 2015 UX_{5}	25 August 2011	list

(562512) 2016 AO_{39}	19 September 2010	list
(562535) 2016 AP_{53}	2 January 2008	list
(562632) 2016 AS_{119}	13 October 2005	list
(563163) 2016 CY_{20}	29 August 2009	list
(563468) 2016 CW_{258}	5 April 2010	list
(563475) 2016 CR_{266}	6 March 2011	list
(563565) 2016 CW_{306}	9 February 2011	list
(563769) 2016 EG_{57}	19 July 2006	list
(564196) 2016 GN_{9}	24 March 2006	list
(564656) 2016 JU_{40}	6 April 2010	list
(564723) 2016 LZ29	4 March 2011	list
(565251) 2017 CP1035	18 December 2007	list
(566211) 2017 QE0156	14 October 2007	list
(566471) 2018 JE094	31 January 2011	list
(567501) 2001 UR03235	10 September 2015	list
(568509) 2004 FT0929	27 March 2004	list
(569288) 2005 RB084	3 September 2005	list
(569620) 2005 UD10539	16 August 2009	list
(569832) 2005 XJ126	13 October 2010	list
(570485) 2006 SX_{163}	24 September 2006	list
(570500) 2006 SE_{197}	20 September 2006	list
(570585) 2006 TQ_{60}	20 September 2006	list
(570636) 2006 UO_{71}	17 October 2006	list
(571152) 2007 DZ_{90}	23 January 2007	list
(571690) 2007 UL_{95}	8 October 2007	list

(571881) 2007 XX_{64}	28 August 2017	list
(571888) 2007 YP	16 December 2007	list
(571889) 2007 YS	16 December 2007	list
(572595) 2008 RR_{152}	9 September 2008	list
(572659) 2008 SR_{185}	24 September 2008	list
(573478) 2009 FY_{43}	29 March 2009	list
(573674) 2009 PQ_{9}	2 May 2008	list
(573801) 2009 TB_{12}	14 October 2009	list
(574332) 2010 JZ_{36}	29 December 2008	list
(574475) 2010 RD_{41}	5 September 2010	list
(574816) 2010 XU_{92}	21 February 2007	list
(575397) 2011 SK_{174}	17 March 2009	list
(575516) 2011 UA_{43}	16 November 2006	list
(575614) 2011 UR_{215}	24 September 2011	list
(576021) 2012 BP_{122}	22 September 2009	list
(576053) 2012 CX_{11}	1 February 2012	list
(576061) 2012 CN_{30}	6 October 2007	list
(576431) 2012 SQ_{2}	28 October 2003	list
(576587) 2012 TY_{197}	10 October 2012	list
(577108) 2013 AD_{92}	23 December 2006	list
(577118) 2013 AM_{111}	12 January 2013	list
(577807) 2013 QG_{93}	1 September 2009	list
(577814) 2013 RS_{14}	31 January 2011	list
(578054) 2013 WY_{1}	23 March 2011	list
(578261) 2013 YP_{101}	8 September 2012	list

(578454) 2014 DZ_{32}	17 March 2009	list
(578613) 2014 EQ_{7}	22 June 2009	list
(579280) 2014 QR_{50}	2 October 2011	list
(580388) 2015 BC_{354}	22 June 2012	list
(580830) 2015 DR_{175}	30 August 2005	list
(581900) 2015 MQ_{5}	12 January 2013	list
(582197) 2015 PN_{198}	14 October 2010	list
(582650) 2016 AG_{3}	26 September 2011	list
(582728) 2016 AX_{187}	6 February 2005	list
(583549) 2016 JT_{14}	24 April 2003	list
(583688) 2016 NZ_{16}	24 May 2006	list
(583976) 2016 QC_{81}	27 September 2011	list
(584345) 2016 XC_{22}	18 May 2007	list
(584709) 2017 QG_{36}	1 August 2009	list
(585278) 2017 XV_{36}	15 April 2007	list
(586654) 2004 HX_{84}	11 September 2008	list
(587949) 2007 DJ_{1}	16 February 2007	list
(588064) 2007 GM_{1}	8 April 2007	list
(588209) 2007 TT_{13}	6 October 2007	list
(588214) 2007 TV_{71}	13 October 2007	list
(588496) 2008 EN_{85}	1 April 2003	list
(588657) 2008 QW_{32}	31 August 2008	list
(588730) 2008 SO_{216}	9 September 2008	list
(589786) 2010 TY_{81}	9 October 2010	list
(590048) 2011 EG_{8}	2 March 2011	list

(590315) 2011 VF_{15}	31 October 2011	list
(590344) 2011 WM_{94}	2 November 2006	list
(590479) 2012 BN_{85}	18 January 2012	list
(590624) 2012 JZ_{10}	20 February 2004	list
(590683) 2012 QP_{3}	16 February 2007	list
(590702) 2012 RN_{3}	8 September 2012	list
(590895) 2012 VY_{74}	12 November 2012	list
(591479) 2013 TB_{171}	14 October 2009	list
(591623) 2013 YK_{114}	9 September 2012	list
(591787) 2014 EY_{80}	24 September 2011	list
(592092) 2014 OV_{119}	18 January 2012	list
(592093) 2014 OZ_{122}	29 August 2009	list
(592354) 2014 UF	21 April 2009	list
(592635) 2015 BF_{263}	2 June 2011	list
(593199) 2015 HN_{86}	26 April 2011	list
(593349) 2015 MX_{129}	15 January 2007	list
(593894) 2016 CR_{8}	6 February 2005	list
(594146) 2016 HY_{15}	2 February 2012	list
(594182) 2016 LO_{5}	12 January 2013	list
(595018) 2000 TY_{33}	4 October 2000	list
(595125) 2001 RR_{18}	30 July 2001	list
(596075) 2004 YJ_{5}	20 December 2004	list
(597072) 2006 SU_{64}	20 September 2006	list
(597477) 2007 HJ	16 April 2007	list
(597540) 2007 MR_{19}	24 April 2006	list

(597759) 2007 UA_{58}	8 October 2007	list
(598569) 2008 VS_{5}	26 September 2008	list
(598581) 2008 VN_{49}	4 November 2008	list
(598964) 2009 KQ_{21}	29 May 2009	list
(598966) 2009 KX_{28}	30 May 2009	list
(599013) 2009 QN_{7}	17 August 2009	list
(599234) 2009 UO_{117}	14 October 2009	list
(599497) 2010 HH_{59}	16 April 2010	list
(599582) 2010 ON_{126}	19 July 2010	list
(599691) 2010 TL_{151}	9 October 2010	list
(600001) 2011 EQ_{29}	6 March 2011	list
(600141) 2011 LN	26 May 2011	list
(601382) 2013 CK_{117}	6 March 2008	list
(601560) 2013 GC_{60}	12 October 2010	list
(601694) 2013 LC_{24}	2 June 2013	list
(601705) 2013 NV_{3}	28 September 2006	list
(602281) 2014 FN_{35}	19 March 2009	list
(602313) 2014 GX_{25}	26 January 2009	list
(602548) 2014 MS_{10}	20 August 2009	list
(602877) 2014 SU_{53}	6 March 2008	list
(603734) 2015 FT_{340}	26 September 2008	list
(604422) 2015 PE_{260}	18 March 2009	list
(604973) 2015 XE_{193}	16 April 2012	list
(605895) 2016 WX_{34}	5 September 2010	list
(607086) 1998 OP_{1}	18 July 1998	list

(607630) 2002 BD_{33}	6 March 2008	list
(607692) 2002 GL_{10}	7 April 2002	list
(608142) 2003 LZ_{9}	14 October 2009	list
(608919) 2004 HZ_{70}	24 April 2004	list
(611373) 2006 UK_{377}	2 January 2008	list
(611973) 2007 LC	5 June 2007	list
(612816) 2004 RK_{85}	9 September 2004	list
(613031) 2005 RD_{4}	3 September 2005	list
(613518) 2006 SO_{154}	21 September 2006	list
(614011) 2008 QQ_{23}	30 August 2008	list
(615851) 2004 KO_{20}	17 May 2004	list
(616118) 2005 JR_{190}	12 May 2005	list
(617328) 2004 RJ_{85}	8 September 2004	list
(617988) 2006 SN_{154}	21 September 2006	list
(618110) 2006 VU_{184}	2 November 2006	list
(618162) 2006 YX_{13}	22 December 2006	list
(618585) 2002 CH_{124}	13 January 2002	list
(622425) 2013 TR_{162}	18 September 2007	list
(625797) 2006 SR_{64}	20 September 2006	list
(626501) 2007 SF_{12}	17 September 2007	list
(626636) 2007 TK_{482}	8 October 2007	list
(626836) 2007 YX	16 December 2007	list
(627245) 2008 SK_{147}	8 September 2008	list
(627270) 2008 SY_{277}	26 September 2008	list
(628722) 2015 XV_{401}	21 September 2010	list

(628973) 2018 VC_{30}	20 September 2012	list
(629225) 2000 TF_{49}	11 September 2000	list
(629313) 2001 RA_{158}	15 December 2006	list
(629352) 2001 TH_{262}	29 August 2001	list
(629635) 2002 VZ_{140}	19 December 2007	list
(631045) 2006 UZ_{17}	16 October 2006	list
(631467) 2007 GX_{28}	8 April 2007	list
(631588) 2007 RU_{135}	13 September 2007	list
(631591) 2007 RA_{150}	8 September 2007	list
(632021) 2007 YV	16 December 2007	list
(632022) 2007 YX_{2}	17 December 2007	list
(632528) 2008 PC_{7}	1 August 2008	list
(633168) 2009 FP_{20}	18 March 2009	list
(633292) 2009 OG_{23}	16 July 2009	list
(634162) 2011 DJ_{25}	22 September 2009	list
(634227) 2011 FQ_{33}	12 April 2004	list
(634333) 2011 JW_{4}	26 December 2008	list
(634708) 2012 GF_{20}	13 April 2012	list
(634869) 2012 TV_{1}	15 December 2009	list
(635047) 2012 VN_{43}	5 February 2005	list
(635151) 2013 AV_{75}	12 January 2013	list
(635637) 2013 YK_{105}	11 August 2007	list
(636097) 2014 OU_{91}	17 September 2009	list
(636806) 2014 WQ_{420}	29 May 2012	list
(636850) 2014 WP_{602}	16 December 2007	list

(637407) 2015 FU_{311}	30 March 2011	list
(637448) 2015 FL_{382}	30 August 2009	list
(637660) 2015 KA_{100}	19 March 2009	list
(639758) 2017 QD_{61}	15 December 2007	list
(641831) 2004 SX_{2}	17 September 2004	list
(643861) 2006 ST_{64}	14 September 2006	list
(643864) 2006 SD_{78}	21 September 2006	list
(644206) 2006 UL_{47}	16 October 2006	list
(644310) 2006 UF_{263}	31 October 2006	list
(645201) 2007 GG_{1}	7 April 2007	list
(645205) 2007 GJ_{5}	12 April 2007	list
(645206) 2007 GK_{5}	11 April 2007	list
(645677) 2007 UU_{53}	15 October 2007	list
(645889) 2007 VO_{351}	27 August 2001	list
(645959) 2007 WQ_{68}	10 September 2012	list
(646126) 2007 YA_{92}	17 December 2007	list
(646193) 2008 AW_{128}	2 January 2008	list
(646328) 2008 CK_{69}	2 February 2008	list
(646427) 2008 CZ_{222}	1 February 2012	list
(647287) 2008 SP_{213}	11 September 2008	list
(647825) 2008 YY_{30}	25 December 2008	list
(647958) 2009 BF_{13}	21 January 2009	list
(647974) 2009 BZ_{108}	30 January 2009	list
(648081) 2009 FE_{44}	30 March 2009	list
(648241) 2009 SS_{21}	22 September 2009	list

(648610) 2009 WE_{154}	14 January 2007	list
(649869) 2011 TT_{7}	2 October 2011	list
(649880) 2011 TO_{20}	1 October 2011	list
(649911) 2011 UA_{105}	26 September 2011	list
(650139) 2011 WD_{160}	21 November 2011	list
(650308) 2012 FF_{1}	16 March 2012	list
(650631) 2012 TN_{7}	10 September 2012	list
(653401) 2014 OZ_{344}	21 September 2009	list
(653489) 2014 QG_{112}	11 July 2005	list
(653956) 2014 WL_{99}	5 July 2008	list
(653973) 2014 WX_{137}	4 August 2013	list
(654019) 2014 WF_{252}	6 February 2005	list
(654322) 2015 AW_{277}	1 August 2009	list
(654440) 2015 BT_{233}	27 December 2008	list
(656237) 2015 XH_{377}	9 December 2015	list
(656691) 2016 CE_{286}	29 May 2012	list
(657138) 2016 HQ_{12}	8 November 2004	list
(657986) 2017 DP_{117}	14 October 2009	list
(658218) 2017 OJ_{51}	22 September 2012	list
(658391) 2017 QE_{128}	2 February 2006	list
(658741) 2017 UG_{21}	29 December 2008	list
(660133) 1999 RN_{213}	13 September 1999	list
(661380) 2004 RE_{85}	7 September 2004	list
(662831) 2006 TR_{60}	14 October 2006	list
(663145) 2007 BG_{7}	23 January 2007	list

(663531) 2007 RT_{135}	8 September 2007	list
(664010) 2008 CW_{68}	2 February 2008	list
(664674) 2008 SD_{333}	7 July 2013	list
(665350) 2009 FV_{43}	29 March 2009	list
(665464) 2009 OS_{21}	30 July 2009	list
(665502) 2009 QO_{29}	23 August 2009	list
(665507) 2009 QF_{38}	29 August 2009	list
(665588) 2009 SR_{21}	18 September 2009	list
(665626) 2009 SW_{108}	1 September 2009	list
(665723) 2009 SF_{289}	16 April 2007	list
(665879) 2009 UV_{107}	14 October 2009	list
(665886) 2009 UJ_{125}	14 October 2009	list
(665887) 2009 UN_{125}	15 October 2009	list
(666526) 2010 QS_{7}	20 August 2010	list
(666772) 2010 UF_{12}	12 October 2010	list
(667293) 2011 FQ	22 March 2011	list
(667730) 2011 SS_{106}	24 September 2011	list
(667913) 2011 TV_{6}	1 October 2011	list
(667914) 2011 TE_{7}	2 October 2011	list
(668087) 2011 UX_{253}	26 October 2011	list
(668615) 2012 CJ_{31}	18 January 2012	list
(669037) 2012 RO_{47}	13 August 2012	list
(669471) 2012 XL_{54}	15 July 2007	list
(669613) 2013 AQ_{64}	8 July 2010	list
(670286) 2013 KX_{16}	13 October 2009	list

(670417) 2013 RM_{31}	5 September 2013	list
(671203) 2014 HV_{98}	21 April 2009	list
(671726) 2014 OD_{297}	23 March 2012	list
(671867) 2014 QD_{54}	30 August 2009	list
(671945) 2014 QH_{235}	12 October 2005	list
(672039) 2014 QO_{425}	2 February 2006	list
(673310) 2015 BL_{384}	8 August 2004	list
(673911) 2015 GG_{53}	26 May 2011	list
(673969) 2015 HL_{96}	13 November 2012	list
(674143) 2015 LU_{2}	2 April 2006	list
(674541) 2015 PQ_{305}	15 April 2004	list
(675745) 2016 AB_{83}	9 December 2015	list
(676404) 2016 GF_{15}	3 May 2011	list
(677721) 2017 CJ_{10}	23 January 2007	list
(677774) 2017 DS_{25}	16 April 2012	list
(677996) 2017 FP_{87}	20 August 2007	list
(678256) 2017 QE	17 September 2007	list
(680406) 2001 VY_{134}	2 February 2012	list
(680622) 2002 TX_{392}	11 October 2015	list
(680866) 2003 UY_{269}	24 October 2003	list
(682359) 2006 NA_{1}	2 July 2006	list
(682513) 2006 TP_{60}	14 October 2006	list
(683126) 2007 OQ_{4}	18 July 2007	list
(683141) 2007 QZ_{3}	18 August 2007	list
(683147) 2007 RQ_{19}	12 September 2007	list

(684155) 2008 LU_{12}	10 June 2008	list
(684362) 2008 ST_{289}	27 September 2008	list
(684743) 2008 WR_{52}	24 October 2008	list
(684866) 2008 YB_{85}	27 December 2008	list
(685123) 2009 FW_{43}	29 March 2009	list
(685551) 2009 UV_{95}	15 October 2009	list
(685558) 2009 UL_{122}	15 October 2009	list
(686682) 2011 BX_{40}	29 January 2011	list
(686878) 2011 FP	22 March 2011	list
(687050) 2011 JE_{2}	1 May 2011	list
(687367) 2011 TV_{7}	3 October 2011	list
(687379) 2011 UX_{15}	19 December 2007	list
(687436) 2011 UW_{210}	2 October 2011	list
(687438) 2011 UT_{213}	4 October 2011	list
(688894) 2013 AM_{190}	11 October 2015	list
(690992) 2014 OW_{56}	17 January 2012	list
(694843) 2015 TN_{360}	11 October 2015	list
(694849) 2015 TN_{367}	20 August 2009	list
(695523) 2015 XD_{397}	21 January 2009	list
(695536) 2015 XR_{402}	8 October 2010	list
(695900) 2016 CC_{22}	29 March 2009	list
(697325) 2017 BT_{75}	20 January 2017	list
(697362) 2017 BQ_{128}	1 September 2011	list
(699868) 2021 SA_{32}	13 October 2010	list
(701741) 2005 LA_{31}	9 June 2005	list

(702454) 2006 HJ_{37}	5 April 2006	list
(702703) 2006 SW_{64}	20 September 2006	list
(703143) 2007 DK_{132}	23 January 2007	list
(703824) 2007 VF_{34}	20 October 2007	list
(704027) 2007 XD_{25}	15 December 2007	list
(704049) 2007 YW_{2}	17 December 2007	list
(704096) 2008 AF_{1}	1 January 2008	list
(704181) 2008 CE_{69}	8 February 2008	list
(704183) 2008 CN_{74}	9 February 2008	list
(704261) 2008 DT_{60}	13 February 2001	list
(704566) 2008 RR_{78}	8 September 2008	list
(704567) 2008 RU_{78}	8 September 2008	list
(704673) 2008 SS_{185}	25 September 2008	list
(705302) 2008 YV_{31}	29 December 2008	list
(705313) 2008 YQ_{64}	2 July 2006	list
(705669) 2009 HD_{67}	9 October 2002	list
(705758) 2009 QD_{8}	18 August 2009	list
(705767) 2009 QT_{37}	27 August 2009	list
(705825) 2009 SV_{21}	18 September 2009	list
(706009) 2009 TL_{11}	13 October 2009	list
(707362) 2011 EF_{8}	2 March 2011	list
(707364) 2011 EL_{14}	2 March 2011	list
(707888) 2011 SF_{235}	23 September 2011	list
(708481) 2012 DA_{83}	29 January 2006	list
(709360) 2013 AT_{75}	12 January 2013	list

(709625) 2013 CD_{214}	28 September 2011	list
(709716) 2013 EK_{90}	14 September 2006	list
(709812) 2013 GE_{95}	16 March 1999	list
(710910) 2014 GO_{7}	21 January 2009	list
(711301) 2014 NC_{26}	16 February 2007	list
(712743) 2014 WP_{117}	26 September 2008	list
(714943) 2015 RU_{242}	18 February 2007	list
(717535) 2016 UB_{84}	30 December 2008	list
(717626) 2016 VV_{17}	14 October 2006	list
(719234) 2018 UM_{15}	11 December 2004	list
(720056) 1997 SC_{32}	24 September 1997	list
(720558) 2001 UU_{236}	14 October 2010	list
(722940) 2006 FE_{58}	20 March 2006	list
(723230) 2006 SX_{64}	20 September 2006	list
(723998) 2007 TT_{71}	13 October 2007	list
(724812) 2008 JG_{8}	5 May 2008	list
(724845) 2008 LT_{12}	9 June 2008	list
(724960) 2008 SQ_{198}	25 September 2008	list
(724966) 2008 ST_{216}	11 September 2008	list
(725458) 2008 XU_{62}	1 October 2011	list
(725639) 2009 BQ_{192}	20 January 2009	list
(725811) 2009 FN_{20}	17 March 2009	list
(726711) 2010 BD_{77}	7 April 2010	list
(726726) 2010 BD_{82}	22 April 2010	list
(727811) 2010 KG	10 December 2004	list

(727909) 2010 KQ_{64}	17 March 2010	list
(728033) 2010 LA_{1}	2 July 2006	list
(728054) 2010 LK_{14}	23 May 2010	list
(728882) 2010 TL_{197}	14 October 2010	list
(729118) 2011 BT_{40}	29 January 2011	list
(729356) 2011 EV_{46}	16 January 2005	list
(729503) 2011 FA_{162}	22 March 2011	list
(730425) 2012 FC_{59}	27 March 2012	list
(730428) 2012 FR_{67}	19 November 2009	list
(730948) 2012 VN_{67}	23 October 2012	list
(731265) 2013 CE_{88}	14 October 2009	list
(731556) 2013 HE_{116}	12 October 2010	list
(731653) 2013 NE_{52}	12 July 2013	list
(731827) 2013 RD_{142}	6 September 2013	list
(731913) 2013 TN_{70}	21 July 2012	list
(732066) 2013 WQ_{56}	15 December 2009	list
(733853) 2014 UR_{282}	6 March 2011	list
(734413) 2015 AT_{88}	11 December 2004	list
(734620) 2015 BP_{99}	18 April 2007	list
(735450) 2015 GM_{36}	24 April 2004	list
(735487) 2015 HW_{36}	15 December 2009	list
(736654) 2015 VK_{10}	16 October 2006	list
(736962) 2015 XJ_{407}	12 January 2013	list
(737720) 2016 EF_{10}	7 April 2011	list
(737853) 2016 EK_{169}	16 September 2007	list

(742160) 2007 EY_{126}	21 February 2007	list
(742954) 2008 CS_{74}	9 February 2008	list
(743893) 2008 YA_{31}	25 December 2008	list
(744367) 2009 OU_{21}	31 July 2009	list
(744371) 2009 OM_{27}	30 July 2009	list
(744393) 2009 QL_{29}	22 August 2009	list
(744504) 2009 SV_{168}	22 September 2009	list
(744549) 2009 SB_{323}	22 September 2009	list
(744610) 2009 TZ_{11}	14 October 2009	list
(744885) 2010 CH_{272}	28 October 2003	list
(745056) 2010 PH_{73}	6 August 2010	list
(745057) 2010 QG_{1}	20 August 2010	list
(745124) 2010 SB_{37}	21 September 2010	list
(746082) 2011 SZ_{105}	23 September 2011	list
(746432) 2011 VC	1 November 2011	list
(746464) 2011 WH_{30}	21 November 2011	list
(746762) 2012 FG_{3}	23 August 2009	list
(746785) 2012 FB_{59}	27 March 2012	list
(748435) 2013 RR_{6}	30 August 2008	list
(748480) 2013 RX_{92}	21 September 2006	list
(749719) 2014 OW_{193}	30 January 2011	list
(749784) 2014 ON_{350}	20 August 2009	list
(749818) 2014 OJ_{428}	12 October 2010	list
(749823) 2014 PQ_{1}	17 January 2012	list
(750987) 2015 AY_{219}	21 May 2011	list

(751115) 2015 BF_{146}	2 January 2008	list
(751342) 2015 CX_{4}	8 February 2008	list
(753844) 2016 EF_{61}	23 March 2012	list
(754057) 2016 GP_{53}	10 September 2004	list
(755368) 2017 DS_{10}	12 August 2007	list
(756107) 2018 GM_{5}	15 August 2009	list
(756282) 2018 VN_{84}	8 September 2012	list
(760249) 2008 TS_{14}	9 September 2008	list
(761786) 2010 RN_{40}	1 September 2010	list
(763003) 2011 TS_{7}	2 October 2011	list
(763169) 2011 UR_{450}	22 October 2011	list
(763889) 2012 RE_{46}	10 September 2012	list
(763950) 2012 TJ_{15}	20 September 2012	list
(765183) 2013 TA_{96}	2 October 2013	list
(767517) 2014 WP_{198}	17 May 2012	list
(768106) 2015 BR_{147}	12 August 2007	list
(768505) 2015 DX_{63}	27 March 2012	list
(770496) 2016 AF_{61}	3 September 2014	list
(771289) 2016 FA_{74}	14 March 2016	list
(771347) 2016 GR_{88}	1 June 2011	list
(771526) 2016 JL_{19}	6 May 2016	list
(775574) 2006 UO_{379}	16 October 2006	list
(775800) 2007 DL_{98}	18 February 2007	list
(776055) 2007 TR_{3}	5 October 2007	list
(776479) 2007 YS_{2}	16 December 2007	list

(777556) 2009 BF_{210}	30 January 2009	list
(777821) 2009 LG	1 June 2009	list
(777841) 2009 QJ_{29}	22 August 2009	list
(778441) 2010 QT_{6}	21 August 2010	list
(778474) 2010 RO_{120}	27 November 2006	list
(780087) 2012 FG_{107}	27 March 2012	list
(780219) 2012 PH_{27}	16 September 2007	list
(780939) 2013 AN_{159}	22 October 2011	list
(781212) 2013 EB_{12}	20 February 2004	list
(786030) 2015 UR_{38}	16 February 2001	list
(788600) 2017 CS_{34}	5 February 2005	list
(793262) 2002 NN_{80}	8 October 2002	list
(794831) 2007 PC_{1}	4 August 2007	list
(797342) 2011 ER_{29}	7 March 2011	list
(797454) 2011 HX_{3}	21 April 2011	list
(797604) 2011 SZ_{232}	26 September 2011	list
(797710) 2011 UT_{212}	2 October 2011	list
(799139) 2013 CT_{259}	13 February 2013	list
(800413) 2014 FN_{2}	5 March 2014	list
(812208) 2004 DM_{53}	23 February 2004	list
(812240) 2004 KZ_{20}	4 March 2011	list
(812981) 2006 DT_{165}	2 February 2006	list
(813358) 2006 VR_{185}	2 November 2006	list
(815077) 2009 QB_{29}	18 August 2009	list
(815078) 2009 QF_{29}	19 August 2009	list

(815079) 2009 QG_{38}	29 August 2009	list
(815118) 2009 SM_{21}	21 September 2009	list
(815477) 2009 XT_{20}	15 December 2009	list
(815829) 2010 TW_{162}	11 October 2010	list
(816255) 2011 EH_{14}	2 March 2011	list
(816298) 2011 FT	23 March 2011	list
(816719) 2011 SB_{290}	27 September 2011	list
(816963) 2011 WZ_{46}	22 November 2011	list
(820217) 2014 QC_{395}	15 September 2007	list
(820504) 2014 UF_{131}	28 October 2003	list
(821082) 2015 BW_{572}	19 July 2010	list
(822163) 2015 PR_{96}	28 September 2011	list
(822934) 2015 XV_{192}	22 September 2009	list
(823778) 2016 NA_{8}	18 May 2007	list
(826041) 2019 JV_{16}	2 November 2015	list
(826674) 2021 PT_{123}	24 September 2016	list
(828878) 2005 TD_{47}	23 September 2005	list
(829651) 2006 YR_{19}	24 December 2006	list
(829716) 2007 DG_{1}	16 February 2007	list
(829724) 2007 DX_{45}	21 February 2007	list
(829802) 2007 GO_{1}	8 April 2007	list
(830019) 2007 TQ_{3}	5 October 2007	list
(830281) 2007 XM_{67}	1 September 2011	list
(831097) 2008 YQ_{24}	26 December 2008	list
(831328) 2009 OR_{21}	30 July 2009	list

(831341) 2009 QS_{37}	27 August 2009	list
(831879) 2009 XX_{20}	15 December 2009	list
(832718) 2010 EA_{155}	15 December 2009	list
(835631) 2011 SQ_{235}	26 September 2011	list
(835699) 2011 TF_{21}	2 October 2011	list
(835759) 2011 UG_{224}	30 January 2009	list
(836068) 2012 CQ_{27}	17 January 2012	list
(836619) 2012 TB_{198}	11 October 2012	list
(837463) 2013 NB_{34}	14 July 2013	list
(838559) 2014 JF_{96}	23 December 2006	list
(844437) 2016 XD_{10}	2 October 2011	list
(844450) 2016 XN_{29}	4 December 2016	list
(848629) 2004 SW_{2}	17 September 2004	list
(849164) 2005 TY_{47}	6 October 2005	list
(849988) 2006 SU_{126}	22 September 2006	list
(850275) 2006 UK_{381}	17 October 2006	list
(850555) 2007 EA_{113}	12 March 2007	list
(850948) 2007 SB_{28}	22 September 2007	list
(850979) 2007 TX_{71}	6 October 2007	list
(850997) 2007 TA_{108}	6 October 2007	list
(851220) 2007 UT_{82}	20 October 2007	list
(852077) 2008 RY_{78}	9 September 2008	list
(852078) 2008 RB_{79}	9 September 2008	list
(852254) 2008 SN_{147}	25 September 2008	list
(852255) 2008 SQ_{147}	25 September 2008	list

(852267) 2008 SB_{175}	9 September 2008	list
(852290) 2008 SY_{208}	27 September 2008	list
(852387) 2008 SN_{332}	24 September 2008	list
(853295) 2009 BX_{209}	21 January 2009	list
(853371) 2009 DD_{96}	25 January 2009	list
(853575) 2009 QQ_{29}	23 August 2009	list
(853591) 2009 QX_{72}	30 August 2009	list
(853599) 2009 QK_{77}	18 August 2009	list
(854448) 2010 HG_{79}	17 April 2010	list
(854778) 2010 TR_{81}	8 October 2010	list
(856189) 2011 SL_{106}	24 September 2011	list
(856458) 2011 TN_{23}	2 October 2011	list
(856594) 2011 UQ_{294}	26 October 2011	list
(856599) 2011 UB_{305}	31 October 2011	list
(856635) 2011 UU_{391}	26 October 2011	list
(857436) 2012 KS_{54}	29 May 2012	list
(857834) 2012 TN_{145}	10 October 2012	list
(858399) 2012 WD_{18}	13 November 2012	list
(862049) 2014 PK_{35}	13 October 2009	list
(862145) 2014 QF_{28}	16 June 2010	list
(864346) 2014 XU_{16}	12 October 2010	list
(866794) 2015 TL2_{06}	20 July 2010	list
(869131) 2016 NE8_{3}	11 August 2012	list
(870444) 2017 BS_{4}	12 September 2007	list
(875573) 2004 XW_{199}	11 December 2004	list

(876403) 2008 CD_{69}	3 February 2008	list
(876556) 2008 SG_{207}	26 September 2008	list
(877827) 2011 FY_{17}	23 March 2011	list
(877907) 2011 LN_{8}	2 April 2005	list
(878028) 2011 SK_{106}	24 September 2011	list
(878103) 2011 TK_{7}	2 October 2011	list
(878104) 2011 TN_{7}	2 October 2011	list
(878718) 2012 VO_{128}	12 November 2012	list
(884092) 2017 BB_{5}	21 January 2017	list
(885415) 2019 CT_{18}	9 September 2016	list
