= 521 Brixia =

Minor planet in the asteroid belt

Discovery
- Discovered by: Raymond Smith Dugan
- Discovery site: Heidelberg
- Discovery date: 10 January 1904

Designations
- Pronunciation: /ˈbrɪksiə/
- Alternative designations: 1904 NB

Orbital characteristics
- Epoch 31 July 2016 (JD 2457600.5)
- Uncertainty parameter 0
- Observation arc: 112.27 yr (41005 d)
- Aphelion: 3.5139 AU (525.67 Gm)
- Perihelion: 1.9657 AU (294.06 Gm)
- Semi-major axis: 2.7398 AU (409.87 Gm)
- Eccentricity: 0.28254
- Orbital period (sidereal): 4.54 yr (1656.4 d)
- Mean anomaly: 308.887°
- Mean motion: 0° 13^{m} 2.388^{s} / day
- Inclination: 10.596°
- Longitude of ascending node: 89.665°
- Argument of perihelion: 316.010°

Physical characteristics
- Mean diameter: 118.11±6.86 km (composite estimate)
- Mass: (1.24±0.33)×10^{18} kg (Note: Calculated from its standard gravitational parameter GM = 0.083±0.022 km^{3}/s^{2}.)
- Mean density: 1.92 g/cm^{3} (Note: Assuming a diameter of 107 km.)
- Synodic rotation period: 28.479 h (1.1866 d)
- Geometric albedo: 0.0626±0.002
- Absolute magnitude (H): 8.31

521 Brixia is a relatively large minor planet, specifically an asteroid orbiting mostly in the asteroid belt that was discovered by American astronomer Raymond Smith Dugan on January 10, 1904. The name derives from Brixia, the ancient name of the Italian city of Brescia.
