= 507 Laodica =

Main-belt asteroid

Discovery
- Discovered by: Raymond Smith Dugan
- Discovery site: Heidelberg
- Discovery date: 19 February 1903

Designations
- Pronunciation: /leɪˈɒdɪkə/
- Alternative designations: 1903 LO
- Minor planet category: Main belt Laodica family

Orbital characteristics
- Epoch 31 July 2016 (JD 2457600.5)
- Uncertainty parameter 0
- Observation arc: 109.58 yr (40025 d)
- Aphelion: 3.4678 AU (518.78 Gm)
- Perihelion: 2.8401 AU (424.87 Gm)
- Semi-major axis: 3.1540 AU (471.83 Gm)
- Eccentricity: 0.099503
- Orbital period (sidereal): 5.60 yr (2045.9 d)
- Mean anomaly: 189.236°
- Mean motion: 0° 10^{m} 33.456^{s} / day
- Inclination: 9.4964°
- Longitude of ascending node: 293.461°
- Argument of perihelion: 100.68°

Physical characteristics
- Mean radius: 22.58±0.14km
- Synodic rotation period: 6.737 h (0.2807 d)
- Geometric albedo: 0.2112±0.045
- Absolute magnitude (H): 9.2

507 Laodica is a minor planet orbiting the Sun.
