= 506 Marion =

Minor planet

Discovery
- Discovered by: Raymond Smith Dugan
- Discovery site: Heidelberg
- Discovery date: 17 February 1903

Designations
- Pronunciation: /ˈmɛəriɒn, -ən/
- Alternative designations: 1903 LN

Orbital characteristics
- Epoch 31 July 2016 (JD 2457600.5)
- Uncertainty parameter 0
- Observation arc: 104.59 yr (38200 d)
- Aphelion: 3.4888 AU (521.92 Gm)
- Perihelion: 2.5889 AU (387.29 Gm)
- Semi-major axis: 3.0389 AU (454.61 Gm)
- Eccentricity: 0.14806
- Orbital period (sidereal): 5.30 yr (1934.9 d)
- Mean anomaly: 178.097°
- Mean motion: 0° 11^{m} 9.78^{s} / day
- Inclination: 17.008°
- Longitude of ascending node: 312.950°
- Argument of perihelion: 146.177°

Physical characteristics
- Mean radius: 52.97±1.3 km
- Mass: (1.08±0.34)×10^{18} kg (Note: Calculated from its standard gravitational parameter GM = 0.072±0.023 km^{3}/s^{2}.)
- Mean density: 1.73 g/cm^{3} (Note: Assuming a diameter of 106 km.)
- Synodic rotation period: 13.546 h (0.5644 d)
- Geometric albedo: 0.0454±0.002
- Absolute magnitude (H): 8.85

506 Marion is a minor planet orbiting the Sun. It was discovered by Raymond Smith Dugan in February 1903, and was later named after a cousin of his. It is designated as a C-type asteroid with a size of approximately 104 kilometres (64.6 mi).
