= 534 Nassovia =

Main-belt asteroid

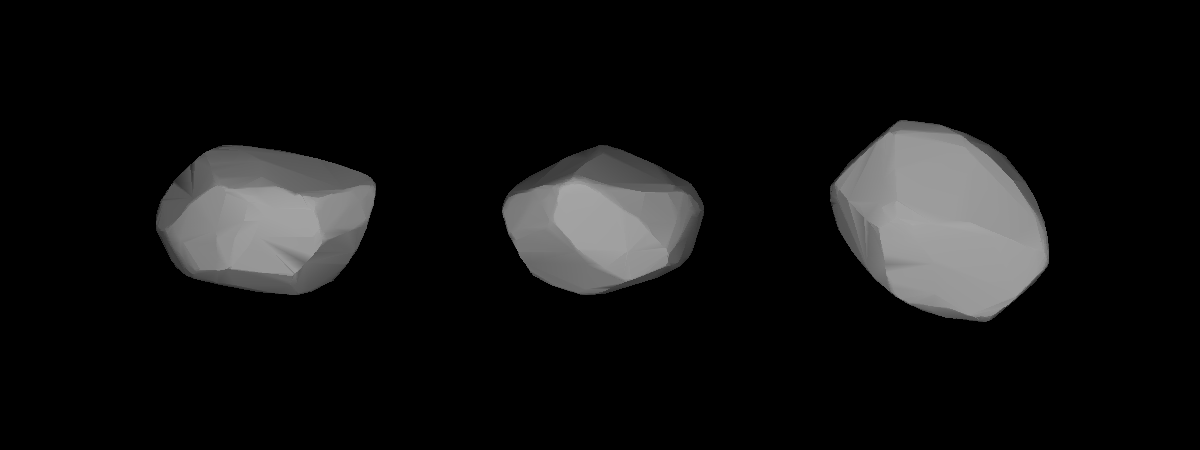
- A three-dimensional model of 534 Nassovia based on its light curve

Discovery
- Discovered by: Raymond Smith Dugan
- Discovery site: Heidelberg
- Discovery date: 19 April 1904

Designations
- Pronunciation: /nəˈsoʊviə/
- Alternative designations: 1904 OA

Orbital characteristics
- Epoch 31 July 2016 (JD 2457600.5)
- Uncertainty parameter 0
- Observation arc: 111.96 yr (40895 d)
- Aphelion: 3.0508 AU (456.39 Gm)
- Perihelion: 2.7227 AU (407.31 Gm)
- Semi-major axis: 2.8867 AU (431.84 Gm)
- Eccentricity: 0.056838
- Orbital period (sidereal): 4.90 yr (1791.5 d)
- Mean anomaly: 102.82°
- Mean motion: 0° 12^{m} 3.42^{s} / day
- Inclination: 3.2735°
- Longitude of ascending node: 94.151°
- Argument of perihelion: 339.550°

Physical characteristics
- Mean radius: 16.56±0.7 km
- Synodic rotation period: 9.382 h (0.3909 d)
- Geometric albedo: 0.1991±0.018
- Absolute magnitude (H): 9.77

534 Nassovia is a minor planet orbiting the Sun. It is a member of the Koronis family of asteroids.
