= 517 Edith =

Main-belt asteroid

Discovery
- Discovered by: R. S. Dugan
- Discovery site: Heidelberg Obs.
- Discovery date: 22 September 1903

Designations
- Named after: Edith Eveleth (discoverer's sister)
- Alternative designations: 1903 MH · 1953 VS; A905 BB · A909 XA
- Minor planet category: main-belt · (outer)

Orbital characteristics
- Epoch 4 September 2017 (JD 2458000.5)
- Uncertainty parameter 0
- Observation arc: 113.69 yr (41,525 days)
- Aphelion: 3.7279 AU
- Perihelion: 2.5889 AU
- Semi-major axis: 3.1584 AU
- Eccentricity: 0.1803
- Orbital period (sidereal): 5.61 yr (2,050 days)
- Mean anomaly: 114.65°
- Mean motion: 0° 10^{m} 32.16^{s} / day
- Inclination: 3.1934°
- Longitude of ascending node: 274.40°
- Argument of perihelion: 140.13°

Physical characteristics
- Dimensions: 79.72±26.64 km 80.11±20.71 km 83.24 km (derived); 83.35±1.27 km 91.12±2.1 km 111.890±0.587 km 111.89±0.59 km
- Mass: (7.5±7.5)×10^{17} kg (Note: Calculated from its standard gravitational parameter GM = 0.05±0.05 km^{3}/s^{2}.) (SB441)
- Mean density: 1.0–2.8 g/cm^{3} (calculated)
- Synodic rotation period: 4.328±0.001 h 9.25±0.04 h 9.274±0.001 h (Note: Lightcurve plot of (517) , Robert Koff, at his Antelope Hills Observatory (H09). Summary figures at LCDB); 9.2747±0.0003 h 9.41±0.07 h
- Geometric albedo: 0.026±0.005; 0.0387±0.002; 0.0397 (derived); 0.04±0.07; 0.047±0.002; 0.05±0.03
- Spectral type: Tholen = X · C · P B–V = 0.711; U–B = 0.327
- Absolute magnitude (H): 9.35 · 9.41±0.32 · 9.52 · 9.52±0.01

517 Edith, provisional designation 1903 MH, is a carbonaceous background asteroid from the outer regions of the asteroid belt, approximately 83 kilometers in diameter. It was discovered on 22 September 1903, by American astronomer Raymond Dugan at the Heidelberg-Königstuhl State Observatory in southwest Germany, who named it after his sister Edith Eveleth.

== Orbit and classification ==
Edith orbits the Sun in the outer main-belt at a distance of 2.6–3.7 AU once every 5 years and 7 months (2,050 days). Its orbit has an eccentricity of 0.18 and an inclination of 3° with respect to the ecliptic.

The body's observation arc begins at Heidelberg, five days after its official discovery observation (first recorded observation at the MPC).

== Physical characteristics ==
In the Tholen taxonomy, Edith is an X-type asteroid. Due to its very low albedo, a more specific P-type is derived by the LCDB, while a spectroscopic survey of Tholen X-type asteroids characterizes Edith as a C-type asteroid.

=== Rotation period ===
In October 2009, the best-rated rotational lightcurve of Edith was obtained from photometric observations by French amateur astronomer Maurice Audejean at his Chinon Observatory (B92) in Chinon, France. Lightcurve analysis gave a well-defined rotation period of 9.2747 hours with a brightness variation of 0.16 magnitude (U=3), indicating that the body is rather spheroidal.

Additional measurements of the asteroid's period were made by French amateur astronomers René Roy and Laurent Bernasconi, as well as by American astronomer Robert Koff at his Antelope Hills Observatory in Bennett, Colorado (H09) and by Alan W. Harris of the Earth and Planetary Physics Group at JPL in the 1980s (U=2/2/2/2).

=== Diameter and albedo ===
According to the surveys carried out by the Infrared Astronomical Satellite IRAS, the Japanese Akari satellite and the NEOWISE mission of NASA's Wide-field Infrared Survey Explorer, Edith measures between 79.72 and 111.89 kilometers in diameter and its surface has a low albedo between 0.026 and 0.05.

The Collaborative Asteroid Lightcurve Link derives an albedo of 0.0397 and a diameter of 83.24 kilometers based on an absolute magnitude of 9.52.

== Naming ==
This minor planet was named by the discoverer after his sister Edith Eveleth (née Dugan). The official naming citation was mentioned in The Names of the Minor Planets by Paul Herget in 1955 (H 55). Edith Eveleth also proposed and prepared the naming citation for Raymond Dugan's first discovery, 497 Iva.
