= Raymond Smith Dugan =

American astronomer

Minor planets discovered: 16
| 497 Iva | 4 November 1902 | list |
| 503 Evelyn | 19 January 1903 | list |
| 506 Marion | 17 February 1903 | list |
| 507 Laodica | 19 February 1903 | list |
| 508 Princetonia | 20 April 1903 | list |
| 510 Mabella | 20 May 1903 | list |
| 511 Davida | 30 May 1903 | list |
| 516 Amherstia | 20 September 1903 | list |
| 517 Edith | 22 September 1903 | list |
| 518 Halawe | 20 October 1903 | list |
| 519 Sylvania | 20 October 1903 | list |
| 521 Brixia | 10 January 1904 | list |
| 523 Ada | 27 January 1904 | list |
| 533 Sara | 19 April 1904 | list |
| 534 Nassovia | 19 April 1904 | list |
| 535 Montague | 7 May 1904 | list |

Raymond Smith Dugan (May 30, 1878 – August 31, 1940) was an American astronomer and discoverer of minor planets. His parents were Jeremiah Welby and Mary Evelyn Smith and he was born in Montague in the U.S. state of Massachusetts.

His undergraduate and Masters was from Amherst College in Massachusetts in 1899 and 1902. Dugan then received his Ph.D. dissertation in 1905 at the Landessternwarte Heidelberg-Königstuhl (Königstuhl Observatory, near Heidelberg) at the University of Heidelberg.

At the time, the observatory at Heidelberg was a center of asteroid discovery under Max Wolf. During Dugan's stay there, he discovered 16 asteroids between 1902 and 1904, notably including 511 Davida.

He was employed by Princeton University as an instructor (1905–1908), assistant professor (1908–1920), and professor (1920—). He married Annette Rumford in 1909.

Dugan co-wrote an influential two-volume textbook in 1927 with Henry Norris Russell and John Quincy Stewart called Astronomy: A Revision of Young’s Manual of Astronomy (Ginn & Co., Boston, 1926–27, 1938, 1945). This became the standard astronomy textbook for about two decades. There are two volumes: the first is The Solar System and the second is Astrophysics and Stellar Astronomy.

Dugan was elected to the American Philosophical Society in 1931. The lunar crater Dugan and the main-belt asteroid 2772 Dugan are named in his honour.

== See also ==
- Dugan
