= 503 Evelyn =

Main-belt asteroid

Discovery
- Discovered by: Raymond Smith Dugan
- Discovery site: Heidelberg
- Discovery date: 19 January 1903

Designations
- Alternative designations: 1903 LF

Orbital characteristics
- Epoch 31 July 2016 (JD 2457600.5)
- Uncertainty parameter 0
- Observation arc: 113.24 yr (41362 d)
- Aphelion: 3.2031 AU (479.18 Gm)
- Perihelion: 2.2418 AU (335.37 Gm)
- Semi-major axis: 2.7225 AU (407.28 Gm)
- Eccentricity: 0.17655
- Orbital period (sidereal): 4.49 yr (1640.7 d)
- Mean anomaly: 98.1577°
- Mean motion: 0° 13^{m} 9.876^{s} / day
- Inclination: 5.0103°
- Longitude of ascending node: 68.903°
- Argument of perihelion: 42.058°

Physical characteristics
- Mean diameter: 89.48±2.49 km (composite estimate); 81.68±4.9 km
- Mass: (1.03±0.15)×10^{18} kg (Note: Calculated from its standard gravitational parameter GM = 0.069±0.010 km^{3}/s^{2}.)
- Mean density: 3.62 g/cm^{3} (Note: Assuming a diameter of 81.7 km.)
- Synodic rotation period: 38.728 h (1.6137 d)
- Geometric albedo: 0.0585±0.008
- Absolute magnitude (H): 9.3

503 Evelyn is a main belt asteroid discovered by Raymond Smith Dugan on 19 January 1903. The asteroid was named after Evelyn Smith Dugan, mother of the discoverer.
