= 518 Halawe =

Main-belt asteroid

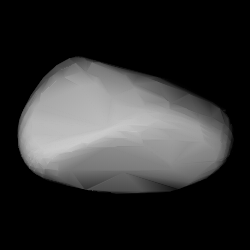
- Modelled shape of Halawe from its lightcurve

Discovery
- Discovered by: Raymond Smith Dugan
- Discovery site: Heidelberg
- Discovery date: 20 October 1903

Designations
- Alternative designations: 1903 MO

Orbital characteristics
- Epoch 31 July 2016 (JD 2457600.5)
- Uncertainty parameter 0
- Observation arc: 112.49 yr (41086 d)
- Aphelion: 3.1107 AU (465.35 Gm)
- Perihelion: 1.9544 AU (292.37 Gm)
- Semi-major axis: 2.5325 AU (378.86 Gm)
- Eccentricity: 0.22829
- Orbital period (sidereal): 4.03 yr (1472.1 d)
- Mean anomaly: 21.1970°
- Mean motion: 0° 14^{m} 40.38^{s} / day
- Inclination: 6.7288°
- Longitude of ascending node: 203.955°
- Argument of perihelion: 117.567°

Physical characteristics
- Mean radius: 7.815±0.9 km
- Synodic rotation period: 14.310 h (0.5963 d)
- Geometric albedo: 0.2880±0.079
- Absolute magnitude (H): 11.00

518 Halawe is a minor planet orbiting the Sun. It is named after the Middle Eastern confectionery halva.
