= 510 Mabella =

Main-belt asteroid

Discovery
- Discovered by: Raymond Smith Dugan
- Discovery site: Heidelberg
- Discovery date: 20 May 1903

Designations
- Alternative designations: 1903 LT

Orbital characteristics
- Epoch 31 July 2016 (JD 2457600.5)
- Uncertainty parameter 0
- Observation arc: 112.91 yr (41239 d)
- Aphelion: 3.1096 AU (465.19 Gm)
- Perihelion: 2.1147 AU (316.35 Gm)
- Semi-major axis: 2.6122 AU (390.78 Gm)
- Eccentricity: 0.19043
- Orbital period (sidereal): 4.22 yr (1542.0 d)
- Mean anomaly: 270.33°
- Mean motion: 0° 14^{m} 0.456^{s} / day
- Inclination: 9.5323°
- Longitude of ascending node: 202.719°
- Argument of perihelion: 90.758°

Physical characteristics
- Mean radius: 28.72±1.4 km
- Synodic rotation period: 19.4 h (0.81 d)
- Geometric albedo: 0.0687±0.007
- Absolute magnitude (H): 9.73

510 Mabella is a minor planet orbiting the Sun.
