= 12564 Ikeller =

Stony Koronian asteroid

Discovery
- Discovered by: W. Bickel
- Discovery site: Bergisch Gladbach Obs.
- Discovery date: 22 September 1998

Designations
- Named after: Ingeborg Bickel–Keller (discoverer's wife)
- Alternative designations: 1998 SO_{49} · 1988 RA_{7} 1991 EG_{5} · 1993 SK_{13}
- Minor planet category: main-belt · Koronis

Orbital characteristics
- Epoch 4 September 2017 (JD 2458000.5)
- Uncertainty parameter 0
- Observation arc: 27.90 yr (10,190 days)
- Aphelion: 2.9423 AU
- Perihelion: 2.7273 AU
- Semi-major axis: 2.8348 AU
- Eccentricity: 0.0379
- Orbital period (sidereal): 4.77 yr (1,743 days)
- Mean anomaly: 67.076°
- Mean motion: 0° 12^{m} 23.4^{s} / day
- Inclination: 1.6200°
- Longitude of ascending node: 180.04°
- Argument of perihelion: 117.88°

Physical characteristics
- Dimensions: 5.17 km (calculated); 5.369±0.259 km
- Synodic rotation period: 7.0321±0.0196 h (R); 7.0423±0.0196 h (S)
- Geometric albedo: 0.222±0.049; 0.2225±0.0495; 0.24 (assumed)
- Spectral type: S
- Absolute magnitude (H): 13.6 · 13.644±0.003 (R) · 14.16±0.23 · 14.282±0.007 (S)

12564 Ikeller, provisional designation 1998 SO_{49}, is a stony Koronian asteroid from the outer region of the asteroid belt, approximately 5 kilometers in diameter.

The asteroid was discovered by German amateur astronomer Wolf Bickel at his private Bergisch Gladbach Observatory on 22 September 1998. It was named after the discoverer's wife, Ingeborg Bickel–Keller.

== Orbit and classification ==
Ikeller is a member of the Koronis family, a group of stony asteroids in the outer main-belt named after 158 Koronis. It orbits the Sun at a distance of 2.7–2.9 AU once every 4 years and 9 months (1,743 days). Its orbit has an eccentricity of 0.04 and an inclination of 2° with respect to the ecliptic.

The body's observation arc begins 10 years prior to its official discovery observation, with its identification as 1988 RA_{7} at ESO's La Silla Observatory in September 1988.

== Physical characteristics ==
According to the survey carried out by the NEOWISE mission of NASA's space-based Wide-field Infrared Survey Explorer, Ikeller measures 5.4 kilometers in diameter and its surface has an albedo of 0.22, while the Collaborative Asteroid Lightcurve Link assumes a standard albedo for Koronian asteroids of 0.24 and thus calculates a smaller diameter of 5.2 kilometers, as the higher the albedo (reflectivity), the smaller a body's diameter at a certain absolute magnitude (brightness).

=== Lightcurve ===
In August 2012, a photometric lightcurve of Ikeller was obtained from photometric observations by astronomers at the Palomar Transient Factory in California. Lightcurve analysis gave a rotation period of 7.0423 hours with a brightness variation of 0.44 magnitude (U=2).

== Naming ==
This minor planet was named by the discoverer after his wife, Ingeborg Bickel–Keller (born 1941). The approved naming citation was published by the Minor Planet Center on 16 January 2014 (M.P.C. 86713).
