= 1947 Iso-Heikkilä =

Carbonaceous main-belt asteroid

Discovery
- Discovered by: Y. Väisälä
- Discovery site: Turku Obs.
- Discovery date: 4 March 1935

Designations
- Named after: Iso-Heikkilä (location)
- Alternative designations: 1935 EA
- Minor planet category: main-belt · (outer); Eos

Orbital characteristics
- Epoch 4 September 2017 (JD 2458000.5)
- Uncertainty parameter 0
- Observation arc: 81.94 yr (29,928 days)
- Aphelion: 3.2712 AU
- Perihelion: 3.0367 AU
- Semi-major axis: 3.1539 AU
- Eccentricity: 0.0372
- Orbital period (sidereal): 5.60 yr (2,046 days)
- Mean anomaly: 198.82°
- Mean motion: 0° 10^{m} 33.6^{s} / day
- Inclination: 11.912°
- Longitude of ascending node: 90.908°
- Argument of perihelion: 144.06°

Physical characteristics
- Dimensions: 29.20 km (derived); 30.72±0.86 km 31.61±0.81 km
- Synodic rotation period: 5.0158 h
- Geometric albedo: 0.049±0.009; 0.0571 (derived); 0.091±0.006
- Spectral type: D · C
- Absolute magnitude (H): 10.80 · 11.4 · 11.51 · 11.61±0.33

1947 Iso-Heikkilä, provisional designation 1935 EA, is a carbonaceous Eos asteroid from the outer region of the asteroid belt, approximately 30 kilometers in diameter. It was discovered on 4 March 1935, by Finnish astronomer Yrjö Väisälä at Turku Observatory in Southwest Finland. It was named after the location of the discovering observatory, which is also known as the "Iso-Heikkilä Observatory".

== Orbit and classification ==
Iso-Heikkilä is a member of the Eos family (606), the largest asteroid family in the outer main belt consisting of nearly 10,000 asteroids. It orbits the Sun in the outer main-belt at a distance of 3.0–3.3 AU once every 5 years and 7 months (2,046 days). Its orbit has an eccentricity of 0.04 and an inclination of 12° with respect to the ecliptic. As no precoveries were taken, and no prior identifications were made, the body's observation arc begins with its discovery observation.

== Physical characteristics ==
The C-type asteroid has been characterized as a rare and reddish D-type asteroid by Pan-STARRS' large-scale photometric survey.

=== Diameter and albedo ===
According to the surveys carried out by the Japanese Akari satellite and NASA's Wide-field Infrared Survey Explorer with its subsequent NEOWISE mission, Iso-Heikkilä measures 30.7 and 31.6 kilometers in diameter, and its surface has an albedo of 0.091 and 0.049, respectively. The Collaborative Asteroid Lightcurve Link derives an albedo of 0.0571 and a diameter of 29.2 kilometers with an absolute magnitude of 11.4.

=== Rotation period ===
In October 2005, a rotational lightcurve of Iso-Heikkilä was obtained from photometric observations by Slovak astronomer Adrián Galád. It gave a rotation period of 5.0158 hours with a brightness variation of 0.35 magnitude. However, the lightcurve is ambiguous and several alternative period solutions are possible (U=n.a.)

== Naming ==
This minor planet was named for the farm, which is located in the Iso-Heikkilä district and owned by Turku University. It became the site of the Turku Observatory, which is also called Iso-Heikkilä Observatory (Finnish: Iso-Heikkilän tähtitorni). It was the observatory's first minor planet discovery. The official naming citation was published by the Minor Planet Center on 1 August 1980 (M.P.C. 5450).
