= 508 Princetonia =

Main-belt asteroid, discovered 1903

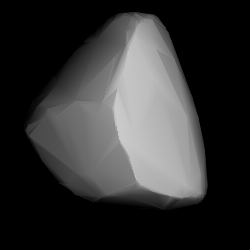
- Shape of Princetonia from modeled lightcurve

Discovery
- Discovered by: Raymond Smith Dugan
- Discovery site: Heidelberg Observatory
- Discovery date: 20 April 1903

Designations
- Pronunciation: /prɪnˈstoʊniə/
- Alternative designations: 1903 LQ

Orbital characteristics
- Epoch 31 July 2016 (JD 2457600.5)
- Uncertainty parameter 0
- Observation arc: 107.99 yr (39445 d)
- Aphelion: 3.1869 AU (476.75 Gm)
- Perihelion: 3.1353 AU (469.03 Gm)
- Semi-major axis: 3.1611 AU (472.89 Gm)
- Eccentricity: 0.0081585
- Orbital period (sidereal): 5.62 yr (2052.8 d)
- Mean anomaly: 25.2307°
- Mean motion: 0° 10^{m} 31.332^{s} / day
- Inclination: 13.337°
- Longitude of ascending node: 44.223°
- Argument of perihelion: 195.015°

Physical characteristics
- Mean radius: 69.845 ± 1.7 km (composite estimate); 71.175±1.3 km
- Mass: (2.99 ± 0.65) × 10^{18} kg (composite estimate) (2.02±0.42)×10^{18} kg (Note: Calculated from its standard gravitational parameter GM = 0.135±0.028 km^{3}/s^{2}.)
- Mean density: 2.09 ± 0.47 g/cm^{3} 2.39 g/cm^{3} (Note: Assuming a diameter of 117 km.)
- Synodic rotation period: 52.8 h (2.20 d)
- Geometric albedo: 0.0441±0.002
- Absolute magnitude (H): 8.4

508 Princetonia is a large asteroid, a type of minor planet, orbiting in the asteroid belt. It was discovered by Raymond Smith Dugan at Heidelberg, Germany in 1903 and named "Princetonia" for Princeton University in New Jersey in the United States.

Dugan found it during his time at Königstuhl Observatory with Max Wolf in Heidelberg, Germany. At the time he was working on his PhD from Heidelberg University. The asteroid is located in the outer areas of the main asteroid belt and is about 140 km (87 mi) in diameter according to data from IRAS, an infrared space observatory in the 1980s.

== See also ==
- List of Solar System objects by size
