= 1627 Ivar =

Elongated stony asteroid and near-Earth object

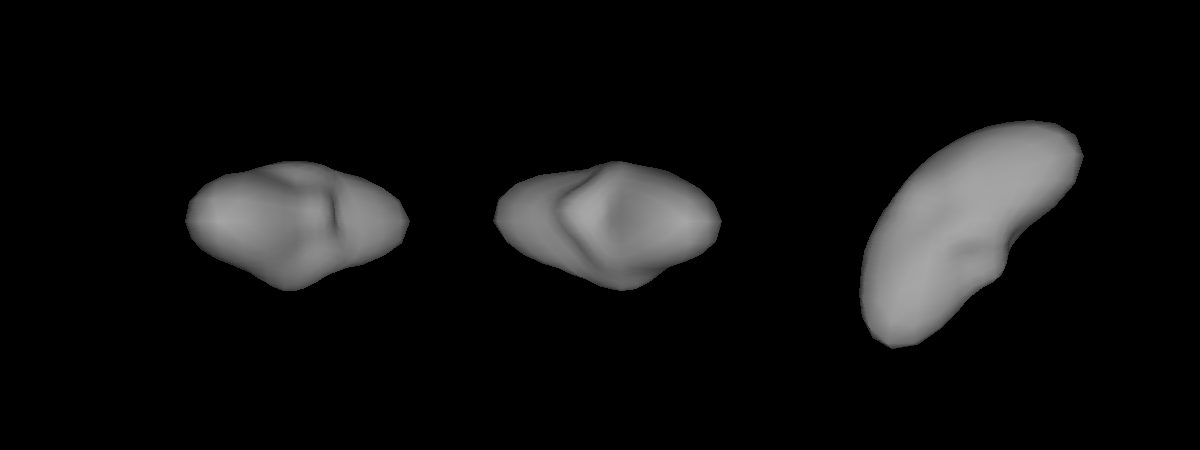
- Light-curve-based 3D-model of 1627 Ivar

Discovery
- Discovered by: E. Hertzsprung
- Discovery site: Johannesburg Obs. (Leiden Southern Station)
- Discovery date: 25 September 1929

Designations
- Named after: Ivar Hertzsprung (discoverer's brother)
- Alternative designations: 1929 SH · 1957 NA; 1957 XA
- Minor planet category: NEO · Amor

Orbital characteristics
- Epoch 4 September 2017 (JD 2458000.5)
- Uncertainty parameter 0
- Observation arc: 87.62 yr (32,002 days)
- Aphelion: 2.6015 AU
- Perihelion: 1.1240 AU
- Semi-major axis: 1.8628 AU
- Eccentricity: 0.3966
- Orbital period (sidereal): 2.54 yr (929 days)
- Mean anomaly: 229.02°
- Mean motion: 0° 23^{m} 15.72^{s} / day
- Inclination: 8.4513°
- Longitude of ascending node: 133.14°
- Time of perihelion: 2023-Sep-09
- Argument of perihelion: 167.76°
- Earth MOID: 0.1117 AU · 43.5 LD

Physical characteristics
- Dimensions: (15.15 × 6.25 × 5.66 km) ± 10%
- Mean diameter: 7.60 km ± 10%
- Surface area: 226.19 km^{2} ± 20%
- Volume: 230.05 km^{3} ± 30%
- Mean density: 2450 kg/m^{3} (optimum assumption)
- Synodic rotation period: 4.7951689±0.0000026 h
- Pole ecliptic longitude: 336° ± 6°
- Pole ecliptic latitude: 37° ± 6°
- Geometric albedo: 0.26 ± 0.02 (weighted mean)
- Spectral type: S (Tholen) · S (SMASS); Srw · S B–V = 0.872; U–B = 0.459
- Absolute magnitude (H): 12.43–12.83

1627 Ivar (provisional designation 1929 SH) is an elongated stony asteroid and near-Earth object of the Amor group, approximately 15×6×6 km. It was discovered on 25 September 1929, by Danish astronomer Ejnar Hertzsprung at Leiden Southern Station, annex to the Johannesburg Observatory in South Africa. It was named after Ivar Hertzsprung, brother of the discoverer. 1627 Ivar was the first asteroid to be imaged by radar, in July 1985 by the Arecibo Observatory.

== Classification and orbit ==
Ivar orbits the Sun at a distance of 1.1–2.6 AU once every 2 years and 6 months (929 days). Its orbit has an eccentricity of 0.40 and an inclination of 8° with respect to the ecliptic. Ivar's observation arc begins with its official discovery observation in 1929, as no precoveries were taken, and no prior identifications were made.

It has an Earth minimum orbit intersection distance of 0.1117 AU (16,700,000 km) which corresponds to 43.5 lunar distances. The eccentric Amor asteroid is also a Mars-crosser. In August 2074, it will pass Earth at 0.141 AU, closer than it actually approached Mars in July 1975 (0.150 AU).

== Physical characteristics ==
In the SMASS and Tholen taxonomic scheme, Ivar is characterized as a common stony S-type asteroid.

=== Rotation period ===
A large number of rotational lightcurves of Ivar have been obtained from photometric observations since 1985 (see infobox). They give a well-defined rotation period between 4.795 and 4.80 hours with a brightness variation between 0.27 and 1.40 magnitude, indicative of its non-spheroidal shape (also see 3D-model image). New radar and visual observations refined the period to 4.7951689 ± 0.0000026 hours. Future photometric observations will show whether the YORP effect will slowly change the body's spin rate (as seen with 1862 Apollo).

In 1985, the body was observed with radar from the Arecibo Observatory in Puerto Rico at a distance of 0.20 AU. The measured radar cross-section was 7.5 square kilometers. It was the first asteroid to be imaged by radar. Radar observations have been performed again in June & July 2013 and July 2018.

=== Diameter and albedo ===
According to the EXPLORENEOs survey carried out by the Spitzer Space Telescope, thermal infrared observations by the Keck Observatory, and NASA's Wide-field Infrared Survey Explorer with its subsequent NEOWISE mission, and thermal modeling by Alan Harris, Ivar measures between 8.37 and 10.2 kilometers in diameter, and it surface has an albedo between 0.09 and 0.15. The Collaborative Asteroid Lightcurve Link adopts an albedo of 0.151 and a diameter of 9.12 kilometers with an absolute magnitude of 12.87. According to model based on radar and photometric observations Ivar is an elongated asteroid with maximum extensions along the three body-fixed coordinates being 15.15 × 6.25 × 5.66 km ± 10%.

== Naming ==
This minor planet was named by the discoverer in honor of his late brother Ivar Hertzsprung. The official naming citation was published by the Minor Planet Center in February 1959 (M.P.C. 1860).
