= List of minor planets: 852001–853000 =

The following is a partial list of minor planets, running from minor-planet number 852001 through 853000, inclusive. The primary data for this and other partial lists is based on JPL's "Small-Body Orbital Elements" and data available from the Minor Planet Center. Critical list information is also provided by the MPC, unless otherwise specified from Lowell Observatory. A detailed description of the table's columns and additional sources are given on the main page including a complete list of every page in this series, and a statistical break-up on the dynamical classification of minor planets.

Also see the summary list of all named bodies in numerical and alphabetical order, and the corresponding naming citations for the number range of this particular list. New namings may only be added to this list after official publication, as the preannouncement of names is condemned by the Working Group for Small Bodies Nomenclature of the International Astronomical Union.

Near-Earth obj.	MBA (inner)	MBA (outer)	Centaur
Mars-crosser	MBA (middle)	Jupiter trojan	Trans-Neptunian obj.
Unclassified

== 852001–852100 ==
Designation			Discovery			Properties		Ref
Permanent	Provisional	Named after	Date	Site	Discoverer(s)	Category	Diam.	Ref
852001	2008 PB_{20}	—	August 7, 2008	Kitt Peak	Spacewatch	·	910 m	MPC · JPL
852002	2008 PC_{20}	—	August 7, 2008	Kitt Peak	Spacewatch	3:2	3.8 km	MPC · JPL
852003	2008 PA_{21}	—	August 3, 2008	Siding Spring	SSS	·	960 m	MPC · JPL
852004	2008 PR_{22}	—	August 7, 2008	Kitt Peak	Spacewatch	·	1.0 km	MPC · JPL
852005	2008 PS_{22}	—	August 1, 2008	La Sagra	OAM	·	2.4 km	MPC · JPL
852006	2008 PG_{23}	—	August 12, 2008	La Sagra	OAM	·	580 m	MPC · JPL
852007	2008 PU_{23}	—	August 7, 2008	Kitt Peak	Spacewatch	·	1.6 km	MPC · JPL
852008	2008 PP_{24}	—	August 7, 2008	Kitt Peak	Spacewatch	·	1.0 km	MPC · JPL
852009	2008 PQ_{24}	—	August 7, 2008	Kitt Peak	Spacewatch	·	1.2 km	MPC · JPL
852010	2008 PU_{24}	—	August 7, 2008	Kitt Peak	Spacewatch	·	960 m	MPC · JPL
852011	2008 QU_{2}	—	August 23, 2008	Dauban	C. Rinner, F. Kugel	·	1.5 km	MPC · JPL
852012	2008 QJ_{12}	—	August 21, 2008	Kitt Peak	Spacewatch	·	510 m	MPC · JPL
852013	2008 QS_{18}	—	August 29, 2008	Pla D'Arguines	R. Ferrando, Ferrando, M.	·	530 m	MPC · JPL
852014	2008 QD_{20}	—	July 30, 2008	Kitt Peak	Spacewatch	·	2.3 km	MPC · JPL
852015	2008 QY_{24}	—	August 30, 2008	Dauban	C. Rinner, F. Kugel	·	1.6 km	MPC · JPL
852016	2008 QJ_{26}	—	August 29, 2008	La Sagra	OAM	·	870 m	MPC · JPL
852017	2008 QQ_{36}	—	August 21, 2008	Kitt Peak	Spacewatch	·	1.5 km	MPC · JPL
852018	2008 QR_{36}	—	August 21, 2008	Kitt Peak	Spacewatch	·	2.2 km	MPC · JPL
852019	2008 QB_{37}	—	August 21, 2008	Kitt Peak	Spacewatch	·	2.0 km	MPC · JPL
852020	2008 QM_{40}	—	August 24, 2008	Kitt Peak	Spacewatch	·	1.2 km	MPC · JPL
852021	2008 QE_{41}	—	August 21, 2008	Kitt Peak	Spacewatch	·	2.3 km	MPC · JPL
852022	2008 QJ_{43}	—	August 21, 2008	Kitt Peak	Spacewatch	NYS	800 m	MPC · JPL
852023	2008 QA_{45}	—	August 24, 2008	Kitt Peak	Spacewatch	·	500 m	MPC · JPL
852024	2008 QK_{46}	—	August 24, 2008	Kitt Peak	Spacewatch	·	2.8 km	MPC · JPL
852025	2008 QA_{49}	—	August 21, 2008	Kitt Peak	Spacewatch	·	470 m	MPC · JPL
852026	2008 QK_{49}	—	August 23, 2008	Siding Spring	SSS	H	400 m	MPC · JPL
852027	2008 QV_{49}	—	December 22, 2012	Haleakala	Pan-STARRS 1	·	680 m	MPC · JPL
852028	2008 QW_{49}	—	August 20, 2008	Kitt Peak	Spacewatch	·	710 m	MPC · JPL
852029	2008 QY_{49}	—	August 21, 2008	Kitt Peak	Spacewatch	·	490 m	MPC · JPL
852030	2008 QF_{50}	—	August 21, 2008	Kitt Peak	Spacewatch	MAS	560 m	MPC · JPL
852031	2008 QG_{50}	—	August 21, 2008	Kitt Peak	Spacewatch	·	1.9 km	MPC · JPL
852032	2008 QL_{50}	—	March 17, 2018	Mount Lemmon	Mount Lemmon Survey	·	2.1 km	MPC · JPL
852033	2008 QR_{51}	—	August 24, 2008	Kitt Peak	Spacewatch	VER	1.9 km	MPC · JPL
852034	2008 QS_{51}	—	August 20, 2008	Kitt Peak	Spacewatch	·	440 m	MPC · JPL
852035	2008 QQ_{52}	—	March 31, 2003	Kitt Peak	Spacewatch	·	840 m	MPC · JPL
852036	2008 RV_{1}	—	September 2, 2008	Kitt Peak	Spacewatch	·	2.2 km	MPC · JPL
852037	2008 RJ_{2}	—	September 2, 2008	Kitt Peak	Spacewatch	·	1.9 km	MPC · JPL
852038	2008 RU_{2}	—	September 2, 2008	Kitt Peak	Spacewatch	·	960 m	MPC · JPL
852039	2008 RR_{4}	—	September 2, 2008	Kitt Peak	Spacewatch	·	1.1 km	MPC · JPL
852040	2008 RC_{6}	—	September 3, 2008	Kitt Peak	Spacewatch	·	2.0 km	MPC · JPL
852041	2008 RP_{9}	—	September 3, 2008	Kitt Peak	Spacewatch	·	1.6 km	MPC · JPL
852042	2008 RA_{13}	—	August 24, 2008	Kitt Peak	Spacewatch	·	380 m	MPC · JPL
852043	2008 RC_{15}	—	September 4, 2008	Kitt Peak	Spacewatch	·	840 m	MPC · JPL
852044	2008 RA_{17}	—	September 4, 2008	Kitt Peak	Spacewatch	ADE	1.5 km	MPC · JPL
852045	2008 RN_{19}	—	August 24, 2008	Kitt Peak	Spacewatch	·	570 m	MPC · JPL
852046	2008 RC_{20}	—	September 4, 2008	Kitt Peak	Spacewatch	·	950 m	MPC · JPL
852047	2008 RQ_{20}	—	September 4, 2008	Kitt Peak	Spacewatch	·	910 m	MPC · JPL
852048	2008 RV_{20}	—	September 4, 2008	Kitt Peak	Spacewatch	·	970 m	MPC · JPL
852049	2008 RB_{25}	—	September 2, 2008	Zelenchukskaya	T. V. Krjačko, S. Korotkiy	·	1.1 km	MPC · JPL
852050	2008 RU_{26}	—	August 21, 2008	Kitt Peak	Spacewatch	·	2.3 km	MPC · JPL
852051	2008 RZ_{26}	—	September 2, 2008	Kitt Peak	Spacewatch	·	800 m	MPC · JPL
852052	2008 RR_{28}	—	September 2, 2008	Kitt Peak	Spacewatch	·	460 m	MPC · JPL
852053	2008 RH_{29}	—	September 2, 2008	Kitt Peak	Spacewatch	·	1.6 km	MPC · JPL
852054	2008 RC_{34}	—	September 2, 2008	Kitt Peak	Spacewatch	·	2.0 km	MPC · JPL
852055	2008 RN_{34}	—	September 2, 2008	Kitt Peak	Spacewatch	·	480 m	MPC · JPL
852056	2008 RB_{35}	—	September 2, 2008	Kitt Peak	Spacewatch	·	1.0 km	MPC · JPL
852057	2008 RG_{37}	—	September 2, 2008	Kitt Peak	Spacewatch	·	2.0 km	MPC · JPL
852058	2008 RD_{38}	—	September 2, 2008	Kitt Peak	Spacewatch	EUN	690 m	MPC · JPL
852059	2008 RM_{40}	—	September 2, 2008	Kitt Peak	Spacewatch	H	370 m	MPC · JPL
852060	2008 RM_{42}	—	September 2, 2008	Kitt Peak	Spacewatch	·	1.4 km	MPC · JPL
852061	2008 RM_{43}	—	September 2, 2008	Kitt Peak	Spacewatch	·	520 m	MPC · JPL
852062	2008 RX_{44}	—	October 9, 2004	Kitt Peak	Spacewatch	·	870 m	MPC · JPL
852063	2008 RF_{50}	—	September 3, 2008	Kitt Peak	Spacewatch	V	480 m	MPC · JPL
852064	2008 RJ_{51}	—	September 3, 2008	Kitt Peak	Spacewatch	·	880 m	MPC · JPL
852065	2008 RV_{56}	—	September 3, 2008	Kitt Peak	Spacewatch	(2076)	500 m	MPC · JPL
852066	2008 RC_{57}	—	September 3, 2008	Kitt Peak	Spacewatch	·	800 m	MPC · JPL
852067	2008 RV_{62}	—	September 4, 2008	Kitt Peak	Spacewatch	·	990 m	MPC · JPL
852068	2008 RF_{63}	—	September 4, 2008	Kitt Peak	Spacewatch	(7744)	970 m	MPC · JPL
852069	2008 RY_{63}	—	September 4, 2008	Kitt Peak	Spacewatch	·	450 m	MPC · JPL
852070	2008 RX_{64}	—	September 4, 2008	Kitt Peak	Spacewatch	·	1.6 km	MPC · JPL
852071	2008 RG_{67}	—	September 4, 2008	Kitt Peak	Spacewatch	·	490 m	MPC · JPL
852072	2008 RK_{70}	—	September 5, 2008	Kitt Peak	Spacewatch	·	2.3 km	MPC · JPL
852073	2008 RY_{70}	—	September 6, 2008	Mount Lemmon	Mount Lemmon Survey	·	690 m	MPC · JPL
852074	2008 RN_{71}	—	September 6, 2008	Mount Lemmon	Mount Lemmon Survey	·	2.2 km	MPC · JPL
852075	2008 RM_{76}	—	September 6, 2008	Kitt Peak	Spacewatch	·	680 m	MPC · JPL
852076	2008 RP_{77}	—	July 30, 2008	Kitt Peak	Spacewatch	·	2.0 km	MPC · JPL
852077	2008 RY_{78}	—	September 9, 2008	Bergisch Gladbach	W. Bickel	·	770 m	MPC · JPL
852078	2008 RB_{79}	—	September 9, 2008	Bergisch Gladbach	W. Bickel	·	780 m	MPC · JPL
852079	2008 RL_{80}	—	September 3, 2008	Kitt Peak	Spacewatch	·	1.9 km	MPC · JPL
852080	2008 RS_{81}	—	September 4, 2008	Kitt Peak	Spacewatch	·	860 m	MPC · JPL
852081	2008 RZ_{81}	—	September 4, 2008	Kitt Peak	Spacewatch	·	2.1 km	MPC · JPL
852082	2008 RV_{82}	—	September 4, 2008	Kitt Peak	Spacewatch	·	1.0 km	MPC · JPL
852083	2008 RO_{83}	—	September 4, 2008	Kitt Peak	Spacewatch	·	1.0 km	MPC · JPL
852084	2008 RT_{83}	—	July 29, 2008	Kitt Peak	Spacewatch	·	520 m	MPC · JPL
852085	2008 RD_{84}	—	September 4, 2008	Kitt Peak	Spacewatch	·	1.1 km	MPC · JPL
852086	2008 RZ_{84}	—	August 24, 2008	Kitt Peak	Spacewatch	·	1.1 km	MPC · JPL
852087	2008 RA_{86}	—	September 5, 2008	Kitt Peak	Spacewatch	·	1.4 km	MPC · JPL
852088	2008 RK_{88}	—	September 5, 2008	Kitt Peak	Spacewatch	·	390 m	MPC · JPL
852089	2008 RX_{94}	—	September 7, 2008	Mount Lemmon	Mount Lemmon Survey	·	390 m	MPC · JPL
852090	2008 RZ_{94}	—	August 7, 2008	Kitt Peak	Spacewatch	·	430 m	MPC · JPL
852091	2008 RE_{95}	—	September 7, 2008	Mount Lemmon	Mount Lemmon Survey	·	870 m	MPC · JPL
852092	2008 RM_{95}	—	September 7, 2008	Catalina	CSS	·	2.0 km	MPC · JPL
852093	2008 RR_{95}	—	September 4, 2008	Kitt Peak	Spacewatch	·	630 m	MPC · JPL
852094	2008 RZ_{108}	—	September 2, 2008	Kitt Peak	Spacewatch	·	820 m	MPC · JPL
852095	2008 RC_{109}	—	September 4, 2008	Kitt Peak	Spacewatch	·	1.8 km	MPC · JPL
852096	2008 RD_{110}	—	September 3, 2008	Kitt Peak	Spacewatch	THM	1.7 km	MPC · JPL
852097	2008 RW_{117}	—	September 9, 2008	Kitt Peak	Spacewatch	JUN	810 m	MPC · JPL
852098	2008 RF_{119}	—	September 3, 2008	Kitt Peak	Spacewatch	·	1 km	MPC · JPL
852099	2008 RR_{119}	—	September 10, 2008	Kitt Peak	Spacewatch	·	380 m	MPC · JPL
852100	2008 RB_{120}	—	September 6, 2008	Mount Lemmon	Mount Lemmon Survey	·	430 m	MPC · JPL

== 852101–852200 ==
back to top

Designation			Discovery			Properties		Ref
Permanent	Provisional	Named after	Date	Site	Discoverer(s)	Category	Diam.	Ref
852101	2008 RT_{123}	—	September 6, 2008	Kitt Peak	Spacewatch	THM	1.8 km	MPC · JPL
852102	2008 RQ_{126}	—	September 4, 2008	Kitt Peak	Spacewatch	·	1.9 km	MPC · JPL
852103	2008 RY_{130}	—	September 5, 2008	Kitt Peak	Spacewatch	·	570 m	MPC · JPL
852104	2008 RK_{131}	—	September 4, 2008	Kitt Peak	Spacewatch	·	880 m	MPC · JPL
852105	2008 RD_{133}	—	September 8, 2008	Kitt Peak	Spacewatch	·	640 m	MPC · JPL
852106	2008 RZ_{133}	—	July 30, 2008	Kitt Peak	Spacewatch	·	1.0 km	MPC · JPL
852107	2008 RB_{135}	—	September 2, 2008	Kitt Peak	Spacewatch	·	940 m	MPC · JPL
852108	2008 RD_{144}	—	September 8, 2008	Kitt Peak	Spacewatch	(2076)	420 m	MPC · JPL
852109	2008 RT_{144}	—	September 4, 2008	Kitt Peak	Spacewatch	V	410 m	MPC · JPL
852110	2008 RS_{148}	—	September 6, 2008	Kitt Peak	Spacewatch	·	2.0 km	MPC · JPL
852111	2008 RG_{150}	—	September 7, 2008	Mount Lemmon	Mount Lemmon Survey	·	1.0 km	MPC · JPL
852112	2008 RM_{152}	—	September 5, 2008	Kitt Peak	Spacewatch	·	490 m	MPC · JPL
852113	2008 RH_{153}	—	September 6, 2008	Mount Lemmon	Mount Lemmon Survey	·	1.2 km	MPC · JPL
852114	2008 RT_{153}	—	September 5, 2008	Kitt Peak	Spacewatch	·	1.4 km	MPC · JPL
852115	2008 RV_{153}	—	September 7, 2008	Mount Lemmon	Mount Lemmon Survey	·	1.1 km	MPC · JPL
852116	2008 RZ_{153}	—	September 6, 2008	Mount Lemmon	Mount Lemmon Survey	·	930 m	MPC · JPL
852117	2008 RC_{154}	—	September 5, 2008	Kitt Peak	Spacewatch	·	900 m	MPC · JPL
852118	2008 RF_{154}	—	September 6, 2008	Mount Lemmon	Mount Lemmon Survey	·	990 m	MPC · JPL
852119	2008 RN_{154}	—	September 5, 2008	Kitt Peak	Spacewatch	·	1.0 km	MPC · JPL
852120	2008 RO_{154}	—	September 6, 2008	Mount Lemmon	Mount Lemmon Survey	·	860 m	MPC · JPL
852121	2008 RB_{155}	—	September 9, 2008	Kitt Peak	Spacewatch	·	420 m	MPC · JPL
852122	2008 RG_{155}	—	September 2, 2008	Kitt Peak	Spacewatch	·	1.9 km	MPC · JPL
852123	2008 RA_{157}	—	May 1, 2006	Kitt Peak	Deep Ecliptic Survey	TIR	2.1 km	MPC · JPL
852124	2008 RB_{158}	—	September 7, 2008	Mount Lemmon	Mount Lemmon Survey	·	610 m	MPC · JPL
852125	2008 RK_{158}	—	September 9, 2008	Mount Lemmon	Mount Lemmon Survey	·	1.6 km	MPC · JPL
852126	2008 RT_{158}	—	September 3, 2008	Kitt Peak	Spacewatch	TIR	1.9 km	MPC · JPL
852127	2008 RW_{158}	—	June 6, 2018	Haleakala	Pan-STARRS 1	·	1.8 km	MPC · JPL
852128	2008 RH_{159}	—	September 5, 2008	Kitt Peak	Spacewatch	·	410 m	MPC · JPL
852129	2008 RP_{159}	—	September 5, 2008	Kitt Peak	Spacewatch	·	2.1 km	MPC · JPL
852130	2008 RQ_{159}	—	September 9, 2008	Kitt Peak	Spacewatch	·	1.8 km	MPC · JPL
852131	2008 RA_{160}	—	June 19, 2015	Haleakala	Pan-STARRS 1	·	1 km	MPC · JPL
852132	2008 RB_{160}	—	July 29, 2008	Mount Lemmon	Mount Lemmon Survey	HYG	2.0 km	MPC · JPL
852133	2008 RC_{160}	—	August 7, 2008	Kitt Peak	Spacewatch	·	1.2 km	MPC · JPL
852134	2008 RC_{161}	—	September 7, 2008	Mount Lemmon	Mount Lemmon Survey	·	2.1 km	MPC · JPL
852135	2008 RT_{161}	—	September 2, 2008	Kitt Peak	Spacewatch	THB	2.2 km	MPC · JPL
852136	2008 RE_{162}	—	September 7, 2008	Mount Lemmon	Mount Lemmon Survey	·	1.8 km	MPC · JPL
852137	2008 RF_{162}	—	September 5, 2008	Kitt Peak	Spacewatch	THB	1.6 km	MPC · JPL
852138	2008 RK_{162}	—	January 2, 2016	Mount Lemmon	Mount Lemmon Survey	VER	2.0 km	MPC · JPL
852139	2008 RW_{162}	—	June 1, 2013	Haleakala	Pan-STARRS 1	·	2.1 km	MPC · JPL
852140	2008 RB_{163}	—	February 3, 2017	Mount Lemmon	Mount Lemmon Survey	·	2.1 km	MPC · JPL
852141	2008 RC_{163}	—	September 3, 2008	Kitt Peak	Spacewatch	·	2.0 km	MPC · JPL
852142	2008 RS_{163}	—	September 7, 2008	Mount Lemmon	Mount Lemmon Survey	·	1.6 km	MPC · JPL
852143	2008 RM_{164}	—	September 5, 2008	Kitt Peak	Spacewatch	·	1.8 km	MPC · JPL
852144	2008 RQ_{164}	—	September 6, 2008	Kitt Peak	Spacewatch	·	2.1 km	MPC · JPL
852145	2008 RL_{165}	—	September 5, 2008	Kitt Peak	Spacewatch	·	1.9 km	MPC · JPL
852146	2008 RW_{165}	—	September 2, 2008	Kitt Peak	Spacewatch	·	850 m	MPC · JPL
852147	2008 RG_{166}	—	January 3, 2017	Haleakala	Pan-STARRS 1	·	630 m	MPC · JPL
852148	2008 RL_{166}	—	October 5, 2013	Haleakala	Pan-STARRS 1	·	1.4 km	MPC · JPL
852149	2008 RU_{166}	—	September 6, 2008	Kitt Peak	Spacewatch	MAR	680 m	MPC · JPL
852150	2008 RM_{168}	—	September 3, 2008	Kitt Peak	Spacewatch	·	2.2 km	MPC · JPL
852151	2008 RO_{168}	—	September 9, 2008	Kitt Peak	Spacewatch	·	520 m	MPC · JPL
852152	2008 RL_{169}	—	September 5, 2008	Kitt Peak	Spacewatch	·	530 m	MPC · JPL
852153	2008 RY_{169}	—	September 6, 2008	Kitt Peak	Spacewatch	EOS	1.2 km	MPC · JPL
852154	2008 RZ_{169}	—	September 10, 2008	Kitt Peak	Spacewatch	·	1.7 km	MPC · JPL
852155	2008 RE_{170}	—	September 3, 2008	Kitt Peak	Spacewatch	·	1.1 km	MPC · JPL
852156	2008 RJ_{170}	—	September 10, 2008	Kitt Peak	Spacewatch	·	1.1 km	MPC · JPL
852157	2008 RL_{170}	—	September 7, 2008	Mount Lemmon	Mount Lemmon Survey	·	760 m	MPC · JPL
852158	2008 RF_{171}	—	September 6, 2008	Mount Lemmon	Mount Lemmon Survey	·	1.5 km	MPC · JPL
852159	2008 RL_{171}	—	September 4, 2008	Kitt Peak	Spacewatch	·	900 m	MPC · JPL
852160	2008 RM_{171}	—	September 6, 2008	Mount Lemmon	Mount Lemmon Survey	EUN	720 m	MPC · JPL
852161	2008 RR_{171}	—	September 4, 2008	Kitt Peak	Spacewatch	·	920 m	MPC · JPL
852162	2008 RS_{171}	—	September 4, 2008	Kitt Peak	Spacewatch	·	950 m	MPC · JPL
852163	2008 RU_{171}	—	September 4, 2008	Kitt Peak	Spacewatch	·	940 m	MPC · JPL
852164	2008 RA_{172}	—	September 7, 2008	Mount Lemmon	Mount Lemmon Survey	·	660 m	MPC · JPL
852165	2008 RQ_{172}	—	September 6, 2008	Mount Lemmon	Mount Lemmon Survey	·	490 m	MPC · JPL
852166	2008 RW_{172}	—	September 4, 2008	Kitt Peak	Spacewatch	·	450 m	MPC · JPL
852167	2008 RF_{173}	—	September 7, 2008	Mount Lemmon	Mount Lemmon Survey	·	1.0 km	MPC · JPL
852168	2008 RK_{173}	—	September 7, 2008	Mount Lemmon	Mount Lemmon Survey	·	930 m	MPC · JPL
852169	2008 RA_{175}	—	September 5, 2008	Kitt Peak	Spacewatch	·	2.2 km	MPC · JPL
852170	2008 RB_{175}	—	September 5, 2008	Kitt Peak	Spacewatch	·	380 m	MPC · JPL
852171	2008 RV_{175}	—	September 9, 2008	Kitt Peak	Spacewatch	(194)	820 m	MPC · JPL
852172	2008 RG_{176}	—	September 5, 2008	Kitt Peak	Spacewatch	L4	6.0 km	MPC · JPL
852173	2008 RG_{177}	—	September 5, 2008	Kitt Peak	Spacewatch	·	580 m	MPC · JPL
852174	2008 RR_{177}	—	September 6, 2008	Kitt Peak	Spacewatch	·	1.2 km	MPC · JPL
852175	2008 RS_{177}	—	September 6, 2008	Kitt Peak	Spacewatch	THM	1.5 km	MPC · JPL
852176	2008 RU_{177}	—	October 1, 2014	Haleakala	Pan-STARRS 1	·	2.1 km	MPC · JPL
852177	2008 RS_{180}	—	September 2, 2008	Kitt Peak	Spacewatch	·	940 m	MPC · JPL
852178	2008 RV_{180}	—	September 6, 2008	Mount Lemmon	Mount Lemmon Survey	·	870 m	MPC · JPL
852179	2008 RG_{181}	—	September 3, 2008	Kitt Peak	Spacewatch	·	950 m	MPC · JPL
852180	2008 RT_{181}	—	September 5, 2008	Kitt Peak	Spacewatch	(2076)	490 m	MPC · JPL
852181	2008 RX_{181}	—	September 4, 2008	Kitt Peak	Spacewatch	·	2.2 km	MPC · JPL
852182	2008 RY_{181}	—	September 6, 2008	Kitt Peak	Spacewatch	·	800 m	MPC · JPL
852183	2008 RC_{182}	—	September 6, 2008	Kitt Peak	Spacewatch	·	950 m	MPC · JPL
852184	2008 RG_{182}	—	September 4, 2008	Kitt Peak	Spacewatch	·	1.1 km	MPC · JPL
852185	2008 RH_{182}	—	September 7, 2008	Catalina	CSS	·	960 m	MPC · JPL
852186	2008 RW_{182}	—	September 5, 2008	Kitt Peak	Spacewatch	·	740 m	MPC · JPL
852187	2008 RF_{183}	—	September 7, 2008	Mount Lemmon	Mount Lemmon Survey	·	730 m	MPC · JPL
852188	2008 RG_{183}	—	September 6, 2008	Mount Lemmon	Mount Lemmon Survey	·	460 m	MPC · JPL
852189	2008 RH_{183}	—	September 6, 2008	Kitt Peak	Spacewatch	THB	1.6 km	MPC · JPL
852190	2008 RT_{183}	—	August 24, 2008	Kitt Peak	Spacewatch	·	1.8 km	MPC · JPL
852191	2008 RC_{184}	—	September 5, 2008	Kitt Peak	Spacewatch	MAR	650 m	MPC · JPL
852192	2008 RE_{184}	—	September 9, 2008	Mount Lemmon	Mount Lemmon Survey	·	950 m	MPC · JPL
852193	2008 RG_{184}	—	September 6, 2008	Mount Lemmon	Mount Lemmon Survey	·	980 m	MPC · JPL
852194	2008 RS_{184}	—	September 3, 2008	Kitt Peak	Spacewatch	·	440 m	MPC · JPL
852195	2008 RY_{184}	—	September 6, 2008	Mount Lemmon	Mount Lemmon Survey	HNS	740 m	MPC · JPL
852196	2008 RK_{185}	—	September 7, 2008	Mount Lemmon	Mount Lemmon Survey	·	1.7 km	MPC · JPL
852197	2008 RZ_{187}	—	September 5, 2008	Kitt Peak	Spacewatch	·	2.1 km	MPC · JPL
852198	2008 RV_{189}	—	September 9, 2008	Mount Lemmon	Mount Lemmon Survey	·	2.6 km	MPC · JPL
852199	2008 RA_{190}	—	September 6, 2008	Kitt Peak	Spacewatch	·	1.8 km	MPC · JPL
852200	2008 RB_{190}	—	September 3, 2008	Kitt Peak	Spacewatch	·	1.8 km	MPC · JPL

== 852201–852300 ==
back to top

Designation			Discovery			Properties		Ref
Permanent	Provisional	Named after	Date	Site	Discoverer(s)	Category	Diam.	Ref
852201	2008 RH_{190}	—	September 9, 2008	Mount Lemmon	Mount Lemmon Survey	·	1.9 km	MPC · JPL
852202	2008 SM_{2}	—	September 7, 2008	Catalina	CSS	·	950 m	MPC · JPL
852203	2008 SD_{14}	—	September 7, 2008	Mount Lemmon	Mount Lemmon Survey	(5)	970 m	MPC · JPL
852204	2008 SQ_{15}	—	July 29, 2008	Kitt Peak	Spacewatch	MAS	580 m	MPC · JPL
852205	2008 SV_{16}	—	September 4, 2008	Kitt Peak	Spacewatch	·	840 m	MPC · JPL
852206	2008 SK_{21}	—	September 9, 2008	Mount Lemmon	Mount Lemmon Survey	·	780 m	MPC · JPL
852207	2008 SP_{24}	—	September 6, 2008	Mount Lemmon	Mount Lemmon Survey	·	530 m	MPC · JPL
852208	2008 SA_{34}	—	September 4, 2008	Kitt Peak	Spacewatch	·	440 m	MPC · JPL
852209	2008 SX_{34}	—	September 7, 2008	Mount Lemmon	Mount Lemmon Survey	TIR	2.0 km	MPC · JPL
852210	2008 SP_{35}	—	September 20, 2008	Kitt Peak	Spacewatch	·	490 m	MPC · JPL
852211	2008 SR_{36}	—	July 30, 2008	Kitt Peak	Spacewatch	(5)	910 m	MPC · JPL
852212	2008 SN_{40}	—	September 20, 2008	Kitt Peak	Spacewatch	·	1.0 km	MPC · JPL
852213	2008 SB_{41}	—	August 26, 2008	La Sagra	OAM	·	1.1 km	MPC · JPL
852214	2008 SN_{53}	—	September 2, 2008	Kitt Peak	Spacewatch	·	2.6 km	MPC · JPL
852215	2008 SF_{58}	—	September 20, 2008	Kitt Peak	Spacewatch	·	480 m	MPC · JPL
852216	2008 SM_{62}	—	August 24, 2008	Kitt Peak	Spacewatch	·	1.4 km	MPC · JPL
852217	2008 SK_{64}	—	September 21, 2008	Kitt Peak	Spacewatch	·	1.2 km	MPC · JPL
852218	2008 SV_{75}	—	September 3, 2008	Kitt Peak	Spacewatch	·	470 m	MPC · JPL
852219	2008 SA_{76}	—	September 3, 2008	Kitt Peak	Spacewatch	·	830 m	MPC · JPL
852220	2008 SN_{76}	—	September 23, 2008	Mount Lemmon	Mount Lemmon Survey	·	2.3 km	MPC · JPL
852221	2008 SO_{76}	—	September 2, 2008	Kitt Peak	Spacewatch	·	920 m	MPC · JPL
852222	2008 SK_{79}	—	September 23, 2008	Mount Lemmon	Mount Lemmon Survey	EOS	1.4 km	MPC · JPL
852223	2008 SX_{79}	—	September 23, 2008	Mount Lemmon	Mount Lemmon Survey	·	500 m	MPC · JPL
852224	2008 SS_{80}	—	September 23, 2008	Mount Lemmon	Mount Lemmon Survey	EUP	3.0 km	MPC · JPL
852225	2008 SP_{82}	—	September 9, 2008	Mount Lemmon	Mount Lemmon Survey	ERI	980 m	MPC · JPL
852226	2008 SP_{85}	—	August 29, 2008	Parc National des Cévennes	C. Demeautis, J.-M. Lopez	·	740 m	MPC · JPL
852227	2008 SU_{85}	—	August 21, 2008	Kitt Peak	Spacewatch	·	530 m	MPC · JPL
852228	2008 SM_{90}	—	September 21, 2008	Kitt Peak	Spacewatch	NYS	800 m	MPC · JPL
852229	2008 SC_{91}	—	September 21, 2008	Kitt Peak	Spacewatch	·	580 m	MPC · JPL
852230	2008 ST_{91}	—	October 14, 2001	Sacramento Peak	SDSS	·	560 m	MPC · JPL
852231	2008 SU_{91}	—	September 21, 2008	Kitt Peak	Spacewatch	·	940 m	MPC · JPL
852232	2008 SA_{93}	—	September 9, 2008	Mount Lemmon	Mount Lemmon Survey	·	900 m	MPC · JPL
852233	2008 SB_{93}	—	September 21, 2008	Kitt Peak	Spacewatch	·	580 m	MPC · JPL
852234	2008 SC_{93}	—	September 21, 2008	Kitt Peak	Spacewatch	·	560 m	MPC · JPL
852235	2008 SQ_{94}	—	September 3, 2008	Kitt Peak	Spacewatch	·	1.9 km	MPC · JPL
852236	2008 SQ_{101}	—	September 21, 2008	Kitt Peak	Spacewatch	·	440 m	MPC · JPL
852237	2008 SU_{114}	—	September 22, 2008	Kitt Peak	Spacewatch	·	840 m	MPC · JPL
852238	2008 SU_{115}	—	September 22, 2008	Kitt Peak	Spacewatch	NYS	910 m	MPC · JPL
852239	2008 SY_{116}	—	September 22, 2008	Mount Lemmon	Mount Lemmon Survey	·	2.2 km	MPC · JPL
852240	2008 SK_{118}	—	September 22, 2008	Mount Lemmon	Mount Lemmon Survey	MAS	490 m	MPC · JPL
852241	2008 SE_{119}	—	September 22, 2008	Mount Lemmon	Mount Lemmon Survey	·	530 m	MPC · JPL
852242	2008 SR_{122}	—	September 22, 2008	Mount Lemmon	Mount Lemmon Survey	MAS	550 m	MPC · JPL
852243	2008 SF_{124}	—	September 22, 2008	Mount Lemmon	Mount Lemmon Survey	·	930 m	MPC · JPL
852244	2008 SP_{127}	—	September 22, 2008	Mount Lemmon	Mount Lemmon Survey	·	1.3 km	MPC · JPL
852245	2008 SW_{127}	—	September 22, 2008	Kitt Peak	Spacewatch	·	480 m	MPC · JPL
852246	2008 SL_{134}	—	August 21, 2008	Kitt Peak	Spacewatch	·	420 m	MPC · JPL
852247	2008 SN_{136}	—	September 23, 2008	Kitt Peak	Spacewatch	·	2.1 km	MPC · JPL
852248	2008 SR_{137}	—	August 22, 2004	Kitt Peak	Spacewatch	NYS	790 m	MPC · JPL
852249	2008 SX_{137}	—	September 23, 2008	Kitt Peak	Spacewatch	·	550 m	MPC · JPL
852250	2008 SC_{138}	—	September 23, 2008	Kitt Peak	Spacewatch	·	400 m	MPC · JPL
852251	2008 SJ_{139}	—	September 6, 2008	Catalina	CSS	·	1.0 km	MPC · JPL
852252	2008 SA_{140}	—	September 24, 2008	Catalina	CSS	·	460 m	MPC · JPL
852253	2008 SO_{146}	—	September 5, 2008	Kitt Peak	Spacewatch	·	2.2 km	MPC · JPL
852254	2008 SN_{147}	—	September 25, 2008	Bergisch Gladbach	W. Bickel	V	410 m	MPC · JPL
852255	2008 SQ_{147}	—	September 25, 2008	Bergisch Gladbach	W. Bickel	·	1.2 km	MPC · JPL
852256	2008 SV_{153}	—	September 3, 2008	Kitt Peak	Spacewatch	·	1.1 km	MPC · JPL
852257	2008 SO_{158}	—	August 24, 2008	Kitt Peak	Spacewatch	·	470 m	MPC · JPL
852258	2008 SX_{158}	—	September 6, 2008	Kitt Peak	Spacewatch	·	1.1 km	MPC · JPL
852259	2008 SY_{158}	—	September 3, 2008	Kitt Peak	Spacewatch	·	880 m	MPC · JPL
852260	2008 SK_{162}	—	September 3, 2008	Kitt Peak	Spacewatch	·	930 m	MPC · JPL
852261	2008 SL_{162}	—	September 3, 2008	Kitt Peak	Spacewatch	·	1.2 km	MPC · JPL
852262	2008 SK_{168}	—	September 2, 2008	Kitt Peak	Spacewatch	·	650 m	MPC · JPL
852263	2008 SF_{169}	—	September 21, 2008	Mount Lemmon	Mount Lemmon Survey	HOF	2.0 km	MPC · JPL
852264	2008 SK_{170}	—	September 5, 2008	Kitt Peak	Spacewatch	·	430 m	MPC · JPL
852265	2008 SQ_{171}	—	September 3, 2008	Kitt Peak	Spacewatch	ADE	1.0 km	MPC · JPL
852266	2008 SA_{175}	—	September 5, 2008	Kitt Peak	Spacewatch	(2076)	450 m	MPC · JPL
852267	2008 SB_{175}	—	September 9, 2008	Bergisch Gladbach	W. Bickel	EUN	740 m	MPC · JPL
852268	2008 SC_{175}	—	September 23, 2008	Kitt Peak	Spacewatch	·	1.1 km	MPC · JPL
852269	2008 SP_{175}	—	September 23, 2008	Kitt Peak	Spacewatch	·	1.7 km	MPC · JPL
852270	2008 SL_{177}	—	September 23, 2008	Mount Lemmon	Mount Lemmon Survey	·	2.6 km	MPC · JPL
852271	2008 SN_{177}	—	September 23, 2008	Mount Lemmon	Mount Lemmon Survey	(1547)	1.2 km	MPC · JPL
852272	2008 SL_{183}	—	September 24, 2008	Kitt Peak	Spacewatch	THM	1.6 km	MPC · JPL
852273	2008 SQ_{184}	—	September 24, 2008	Kitt Peak	Spacewatch	·	1.6 km	MPC · JPL
852274	2008 SC_{186}	—	September 25, 2008	Mount Lemmon	Mount Lemmon Survey	·	870 m	MPC · JPL
852275	2008 SC_{187}	—	September 25, 2008	Kitt Peak	Spacewatch	·	2.2 km	MPC · JPL
852276	2008 SX_{188}	—	March 10, 2002	Kitt Peak	Spacewatch	·	900 m	MPC · JPL
852277	2008 ST_{189}	—	September 7, 2008	Mount Lemmon	Mount Lemmon Survey	·	2.3 km	MPC · JPL
852278	2008 SK_{190}	—	September 25, 2008	Kitt Peak	Spacewatch	·	1.4 km	MPC · JPL
852279	2008 SN_{190}	—	September 25, 2008	Kitt Peak	Spacewatch	·	1 km	MPC · JPL
852280	2008 ST_{190}	—	September 25, 2008	Mount Lemmon	Mount Lemmon Survey	·	670 m	MPC · JPL
852281	2008 SQ_{191}	—	September 21, 2008	Kitt Peak	Spacewatch	·	550 m	MPC · JPL
852282	2008 ST_{194}	—	September 25, 2008	Kitt Peak	Spacewatch	·	2.3 km	MPC · JPL
852283	2008 SJ_{195}	—	September 7, 2008	Mount Lemmon	Mount Lemmon Survey	·	480 m	MPC · JPL
852284	2008 SD_{198}	—	September 25, 2008	Kitt Peak	Spacewatch	·	1.0 km	MPC · JPL
852285	2008 SB_{199}	—	September 26, 2008	Mount Lemmon	Mount Lemmon Survey	·	910 m	MPC · JPL
852286	2008 SL_{200}	—	September 26, 2008	Kitt Peak	Spacewatch	·	1.8 km	MPC · JPL
852287	2008 SW_{202}	—	September 26, 2008	Kitt Peak	Spacewatch	T_{j} (2.96)	1.9 km	MPC · JPL
852288	2008 SD_{204}	—	September 26, 2008	Kitt Peak	Spacewatch	H	450 m	MPC · JPL
852289	2008 SK_{206}	—	September 26, 2008	Kitt Peak	Spacewatch	·	980 m	MPC · JPL
852290	2008 SY_{208}	—	September 27, 2008	Bergisch Gladbach	W. Bickel	·	880 m	MPC · JPL
852291	2008 SQ_{209}	—	October 13, 2004	Kitt Peak	Spacewatch	·	730 m	MPC · JPL
852292	2008 SU_{210}	—	September 28, 2008	Catalina	CSS	JUN	810 m	MPC · JPL
852293	2008 SH_{211}	—	September 28, 2008	Mount Lemmon	Mount Lemmon Survey	·	670 m	MPC · JPL
852294	2008 SO_{212}	—	September 19, 2008	Kitt Peak	Spacewatch	·	2.3 km	MPC · JPL
852295	2008 SU_{212}	—	September 29, 2008	Mount Lemmon	Mount Lemmon Survey	H	280 m	MPC · JPL
852296	2008 SP_{214}	—	September 6, 2008	Kitt Peak	Spacewatch	·	1.9 km	MPC · JPL
852297	2008 SH_{216}	—	September 2, 2008	Kitt Peak	Spacewatch	·	410 m	MPC · JPL
852298	2008 SU_{216}	—	September 29, 2008	Mount Lemmon	Mount Lemmon Survey	·	2.3 km	MPC · JPL
852299	2008 SE_{217}	—	September 29, 2008	Mount Lemmon	Mount Lemmon Survey	·	1.8 km	MPC · JPL
852300	2008 SH_{221}	—	September 25, 2008	Mount Lemmon	Mount Lemmon Survey	MIS	1.4 km	MPC · JPL

== 852301–852400 ==
back to top

Designation			Discovery			Properties		Ref
Permanent	Provisional	Named after	Date	Site	Discoverer(s)	Category	Diam.	Ref
852301	2008 SF_{223}	—	August 24, 2008	Kitt Peak	Spacewatch	·	510 m	MPC · JPL
852302	2008 SW_{224}	—	September 26, 2008	Kitt Peak	Spacewatch	·	880 m	MPC · JPL
852303	2008 SR_{226}	—	September 27, 2008	Mount Lemmon	Mount Lemmon Survey	·	1.4 km	MPC · JPL
852304	2008 SC_{227}	—	September 5, 2008	Kitt Peak	Spacewatch	·	570 m	MPC · JPL
852305	2008 SD_{228}	—	September 28, 2008	Mount Lemmon	Mount Lemmon Survey	·	1.0 km	MPC · JPL
852306	2008 SB_{231}	—	September 28, 2008	Mount Lemmon	Mount Lemmon Survey	·	850 m	MPC · JPL
852307	2008 SX_{234}	—	September 28, 2008	Mount Lemmon	Mount Lemmon Survey	·	1.8 km	MPC · JPL
852308	2008 SB_{236}	—	September 29, 2008	Mount Lemmon	Mount Lemmon Survey	·	910 m	MPC · JPL
852309	2008 ST_{240}	—	September 29, 2008	Kitt Peak	Spacewatch	·	1.5 km	MPC · JPL
852310	2008 SY_{243}	—	September 24, 2008	Kitt Peak	Spacewatch	·	870 m	MPC · JPL
852311	2008 SZ_{245}	—	September 29, 2008	Catalina	CSS	·	1.2 km	MPC · JPL
852312	2008 SF_{249}	—	September 22, 2008	Kitt Peak	Spacewatch	·	1.1 km	MPC · JPL
852313	2008 SG_{249}	—	September 22, 2008	Kitt Peak	Spacewatch	·	840 m	MPC · JPL
852314	2008 SA_{254}	—	September 22, 2008	Kitt Peak	Spacewatch	·	1.8 km	MPC · JPL
852315	2008 ST_{257}	—	September 22, 2008	Kitt Peak	Spacewatch	·	1.1 km	MPC · JPL
852316	2008 SG_{260}	—	September 23, 2008	Mount Lemmon	Mount Lemmon Survey	·	1.9 km	MPC · JPL
852317	2008 SS_{261}	—	September 24, 2008	Kitt Peak	Spacewatch	·	480 m	MPC · JPL
852318	2008 SV_{262}	—	September 24, 2008	Kitt Peak	Spacewatch	·	920 m	MPC · JPL
852319	2008 SG_{263}	—	September 24, 2008	Kitt Peak	Spacewatch	·	830 m	MPC · JPL
852320	2008 SX_{265}	—	September 29, 2008	Kitt Peak	Spacewatch	·	880 m	MPC · JPL
852321	2008 SA_{271}	—	September 26, 2008	Kitt Peak	Spacewatch	(5)	970 m	MPC · JPL
852322	2008 SC_{271}	—	September 27, 2008	Mount Lemmon	Mount Lemmon Survey	·	2.4 km	MPC · JPL
852323	2008 SQ_{272}	—	September 23, 2008	Mount Lemmon	Mount Lemmon Survey	·	550 m	MPC · JPL
852324	2008 SP_{276}	—	September 24, 2008	Kitt Peak	Spacewatch	·	1.1 km	MPC · JPL
852325	2008 SJ_{278}	—	September 29, 2008	Kitt Peak	Spacewatch	·	470 m	MPC · JPL
852326	2008 SO_{281}	—	September 22, 2008	Mount Lemmon	Mount Lemmon Survey	(2076)	560 m	MPC · JPL
852327	2008 SJ_{283}	—	September 22, 2008	Mount Lemmon	Mount Lemmon Survey	·	2.0 km	MPC · JPL
852328	2008 SS_{283}	—	September 23, 2008	Kitt Peak	Spacewatch	V	400 m	MPC · JPL
852329	2008 SF_{285}	—	September 29, 2008	Kitt Peak	Spacewatch	·	450 m	MPC · JPL
852330	2008 SX_{287}	—	September 23, 2008	Kitt Peak	Spacewatch	·	950 m	MPC · JPL
852331	2008 SP_{288}	—	September 24, 2008	Mount Lemmon	Mount Lemmon Survey	·	1.1 km	MPC · JPL
852332	2008 SX_{288}	—	September 24, 2008	Kitt Peak	Spacewatch	NYS	960 m	MPC · JPL
852333	2008 SS_{290}	—	September 23, 2008	Mount Lemmon	Mount Lemmon Survey	PHO	780 m	MPC · JPL
852334	2008 SC_{291}	—	September 20, 2008	Mount Lemmon	Mount Lemmon Survey	·	980 m	MPC · JPL
852335	2008 SZ_{291}	—	September 6, 2008	Catalina	CSS	·	1.1 km	MPC · JPL
852336	2008 SH_{295}	—	September 24, 2008	Catalina	CSS	·	950 m	MPC · JPL
852337	2008 SN_{295}	—	September 5, 2008	Kitt Peak	Spacewatch	·	1.4 km	MPC · JPL
852338	2008 SO_{295}	—	September 24, 2008	Catalina	CSS	(1547)	1.0 km	MPC · JPL
852339	2008 ST_{296}	—	September 29, 2008	Catalina	CSS	EUN	900 m	MPC · JPL
852340	2008 SG_{297}	—	September 23, 2008	Catalina	CSS	·	1.4 km	MPC · JPL
852341	2008 ST_{299}	—	September 22, 2008	Kitt Peak	Spacewatch	THM	1.6 km	MPC · JPL
852342	2008 SM_{303}	—	September 24, 2008	Kitt Peak	Spacewatch	·	1.0 km	MPC · JPL
852343	2008 SY_{307}	—	September 29, 2008	Kitt Peak	Spacewatch	THM	1.7 km	MPC · JPL
852344	2008 SB_{308}	—	September 29, 2008	Kitt Peak	Spacewatch	·	830 m	MPC · JPL
852345	2008 SE_{309}	—	September 23, 2008	Socorro	LINEAR	·	1.2 km	MPC · JPL
852346	2008 SN_{310}	—	September 23, 2008	Mount Lemmon	Mount Lemmon Survey	·	1.2 km	MPC · JPL
852347	2008 SZ_{310}	—	April 4, 2021	Mount Lemmon	Mount Lemmon Survey	·	490 m	MPC · JPL
852348	2008 SP_{311}	—	September 26, 2008	Kitt Peak	Spacewatch	·	890 m	MPC · JPL
852349	2008 SM_{312}	—	September 28, 2008	Mount Lemmon	Mount Lemmon Survey	·	2.3 km	MPC · JPL
852350	2008 SH_{315}	—	September 24, 2008	Mount Lemmon	Mount Lemmon Survey	·	1.2 km	MPC · JPL
852351	2008 SK_{317}	—	January 10, 2013	Haleakala	Pan-STARRS 1	·	490 m	MPC · JPL
852352	2008 SL_{317}	—	March 28, 2011	Mount Lemmon	Mount Lemmon Survey	·	820 m	MPC · JPL
852353	2008 SP_{318}	—	September 24, 2008	Kitt Peak	Spacewatch	HYG	2.0 km	MPC · JPL
852354	2008 SN_{320}	—	September 20, 2008	Mount Lemmon	Mount Lemmon Survey	AGN	850 m	MPC · JPL
852355	2008 SR_{320}	—	September 23, 2008	Kitt Peak	Spacewatch	·	1 km	MPC · JPL
852356	2008 SB_{321}	—	September 28, 2008	Mount Lemmon	Mount Lemmon Survey	·	510 m	MPC · JPL
852357	2008 SD_{321}	—	September 23, 2008	Kitt Peak	Spacewatch	·	410 m	MPC · JPL
852358	2008 SE_{321}	—	September 21, 2008	Mount Lemmon	Mount Lemmon Survey	·	670 m	MPC · JPL
852359	2008 SN_{321}	—	April 9, 2015	Mount Lemmon	Mount Lemmon Survey	HNS	730 m	MPC · JPL
852360	2008 SR_{321}	—	September 25, 2008	Mount Lemmon	Mount Lemmon Survey	·	880 m	MPC · JPL
852361	2008 SK_{322}	—	September 23, 2008	Kitt Peak	Spacewatch	(5)	930 m	MPC · JPL
852362	2008 SL_{322}	—	September 27, 2008	Mount Lemmon	Mount Lemmon Survey	NYS	790 m	MPC · JPL
852363	2008 SK_{323}	—	September 25, 2008	Kitt Peak	Spacewatch	·	840 m	MPC · JPL
852364	2008 SY_{323}	—	September 28, 2008	Mount Lemmon	Mount Lemmon Survey	·	860 m	MPC · JPL
852365	2008 SO_{324}	—	September 23, 2008	Kitt Peak	Spacewatch	LIX	2.6 km	MPC · JPL
852366	2008 SK_{325}	—	September 27, 2008	Mount Lemmon	Mount Lemmon Survey	·	2.0 km	MPC · JPL
852367	2008 SU_{325}	—	September 20, 2008	Mount Lemmon	Mount Lemmon Survey	NYS	700 m	MPC · JPL
852368	2008 SW_{325}	—	September 25, 2008	Kitt Peak	Spacewatch	·	2.3 km	MPC · JPL
852369	2008 SP_{327}	—	September 24, 2008	Kitt Peak	Spacewatch	·	1.4 km	MPC · JPL
852370	2008 SM_{328}	—	September 16, 2012	Mount Lemmon	Mount Lemmon Survey	·	940 m	MPC · JPL
852371	2008 SS_{328}	—	September 23, 2008	Mount Lemmon	Mount Lemmon Survey	·	2.2 km	MPC · JPL
852372	2008 ST_{328}	—	November 26, 2014	Haleakala	Pan-STARRS 1	·	1.6 km	MPC · JPL
852373	2008 SA_{329}	—	September 23, 2008	Kitt Peak	Spacewatch	(5)	910 m	MPC · JPL
852374	2008 SB_{329}	—	August 20, 2003	Campo Imperatore	CINEOS	DOR	1.4 km	MPC · JPL
852375	2008 SE_{329}	—	June 25, 2015	Haleakala	Pan-STARRS 1	MAS	550 m	MPC · JPL
852376	2008 SK_{329}	—	September 23, 2008	Kitt Peak	Spacewatch	·	2.4 km	MPC · JPL
852377	2008 SQ_{329}	—	September 28, 2008	Mount Lemmon	Mount Lemmon Survey	·	2.2 km	MPC · JPL
852378	2008 SJ_{330}	—	October 17, 2014	Mount Lemmon	Mount Lemmon Survey	·	2.7 km	MPC · JPL
852379	2008 SL_{330}	—	September 23, 2008	Kitt Peak	Spacewatch	·	490 m	MPC · JPL
852380	2008 SW_{330}	—	September 21, 2008	Kitt Peak	Spacewatch	·	490 m	MPC · JPL
852381	2008 SG_{331}	—	September 20, 2008	Mount Lemmon	Mount Lemmon Survey	·	510 m	MPC · JPL
852382	2008 SK_{331}	—	September 23, 2008	Kitt Peak	Spacewatch	·	470 m	MPC · JPL
852383	2008 SP_{331}	—	September 23, 2008	Kitt Peak	Spacewatch	·	510 m	MPC · JPL
852384	2008 SR_{331}	—	September 6, 2008	Kitt Peak	Spacewatch	·	450 m	MPC · JPL
852385	2008 SS_{331}	—	September 29, 2008	Mount Lemmon	Mount Lemmon Survey	(2076)	420 m	MPC · JPL
852386	2008 SK_{332}	—	February 18, 2017	Haleakala	Pan-STARRS 1	·	2.4 km	MPC · JPL
852387	2008 SN_{332}	—	September 24, 2008	Bergisch Gladbach	W. Bickel	·	2.1 km	MPC · JPL
852388	2008 SO_{332}	—	September 21, 2008	Mount Lemmon	Mount Lemmon Survey	NYS	840 m	MPC · JPL
852389	2008 SW_{332}	—	September 21, 2008	Kitt Peak	Spacewatch	·	2.2 km	MPC · JPL
852390	2008 SB_{333}	—	September 23, 2008	Mount Lemmon	Mount Lemmon Survey	·	1.0 km	MPC · JPL
852391	2008 SJ_{333}	—	September 23, 2008	Kitt Peak	Spacewatch	·	1.8 km	MPC · JPL
852392	2008 SM_{333}	—	September 19, 2008	Kitt Peak	Spacewatch	·	2.4 km	MPC · JPL
852393	2008 SE_{335}	—	September 21, 2008	Mount Lemmon	Mount Lemmon Survey	·	2.3 km	MPC · JPL
852394	2008 SC_{336}	—	September 29, 2008	Mount Lemmon	Mount Lemmon Survey	·	410 m	MPC · JPL
852395	2008 SK_{337}	—	September 23, 2008	Mount Lemmon	Mount Lemmon Survey	·	920 m	MPC · JPL
852396	2008 SG_{338}	—	April 1, 2017	Haleakala	Pan-STARRS 1	·	2.2 km	MPC · JPL
852397	2008 SO_{338}	—	September 23, 2008	Kitt Peak	Spacewatch	·	1.5 km	MPC · JPL
852398	2008 SE_{339}	—	September 22, 2008	Mount Lemmon	Mount Lemmon Survey	·	2.3 km	MPC · JPL
852399	2008 SL_{339}	—	September 6, 2008	Mount Lemmon	Mount Lemmon Survey	·	690 m	MPC · JPL
852400	2008 SS_{339}	—	September 23, 2008	Kitt Peak	Spacewatch	·	680 m	MPC · JPL

== 852401–852500 ==
back to top

Designation			Discovery			Properties		Ref
Permanent	Provisional	Named after	Date	Site	Discoverer(s)	Category	Diam.	Ref
852401	2008 SZ_{339}	—	September 23, 2008	Mount Lemmon	Mount Lemmon Survey	·	830 m	MPC · JPL
852402	2008 SH_{341}	—	September 26, 2008	Kitt Peak	Spacewatch	·	2.6 km	MPC · JPL
852403	2008 ST_{341}	—	September 23, 2008	Kitt Peak	Spacewatch	H	410 m	MPC · JPL
852404	2008 SU_{342}	—	September 23, 2008	Kitt Peak	Spacewatch	·	710 m	MPC · JPL
852405	2008 SH_{343}	—	September 23, 2008	Mount Lemmon	Mount Lemmon Survey	·	540 m	MPC · JPL
852406	2008 SJ_{343}	—	September 22, 2008	Mount Lemmon	Mount Lemmon Survey	·	540 m	MPC · JPL
852407	2008 SO_{343}	—	September 23, 2008	Mount Lemmon	Mount Lemmon Survey	·	1.0 km	MPC · JPL
852408	2008 SP_{344}	—	September 23, 2008	Kitt Peak	Spacewatch	·	470 m	MPC · JPL
852409	2008 SW_{344}	—	September 29, 2008	Kitt Peak	Spacewatch	·	1.4 km	MPC · JPL
852410	2008 SM_{346}	—	September 29, 2008	Kitt Peak	Spacewatch	·	2.0 km	MPC · JPL
852411	2008 SE_{347}	—	September 27, 2008	Mount Lemmon	Mount Lemmon Survey	·	1.9 km	MPC · JPL
852412	2008 SK_{347}	—	September 24, 2008	Kitt Peak	Spacewatch	·	2.3 km	MPC · JPL
852413	2008 SE_{348}	—	September 29, 2008	Kitt Peak	Spacewatch	·	920 m	MPC · JPL
852414	2008 SX_{348}	—	September 23, 2008	Kitt Peak	Spacewatch	·	520 m	MPC · JPL
852415	2008 SO_{350}	—	September 24, 2008	Kitt Peak	Spacewatch	EUN	760 m	MPC · JPL
852416	2008 SB_{351}	—	September 23, 2008	Kitt Peak	Spacewatch	V	370 m	MPC · JPL
852417	2008 SN_{351}	—	September 23, 2008	Kitt Peak	Spacewatch	·	880 m	MPC · JPL
852418	2008 SR_{351}	—	September 29, 2008	Mount Lemmon	Mount Lemmon Survey	·	2.0 km	MPC · JPL
852419	2008 SH_{353}	—	September 21, 2008	Mount Lemmon	Mount Lemmon Survey	H	340 m	MPC · JPL
852420	2008 SJ_{353}	—	September 23, 2008	Kitt Peak	Spacewatch	·	870 m	MPC · JPL
852421	2008 SH_{354}	—	November 2, 2008	Mount Lemmon	Mount Lemmon Survey	·	1.1 km	MPC · JPL
852422	2008 SO_{354}	—	September 23, 2008	Mount Lemmon	Mount Lemmon Survey	·	880 m	MPC · JPL
852423	2008 SD_{355}	—	September 23, 2008	Mount Lemmon	Mount Lemmon Survey	·	1.9 km	MPC · JPL
852424	2008 SM_{355}	—	September 29, 2008	Mount Lemmon	Mount Lemmon Survey	·	450 m	MPC · JPL
852425	2008 SS_{355}	—	September 25, 2008	Mount Lemmon	Mount Lemmon Survey	·	1.0 km	MPC · JPL
852426	2008 SW_{355}	—	September 25, 2008	Kitt Peak	Spacewatch	·	980 m	MPC · JPL
852427	2008 SZ_{355}	—	September 24, 2008	Mount Lemmon	Mount Lemmon Survey	·	1.0 km	MPC · JPL
852428	2008 SC_{356}	—	September 27, 2008	Mount Lemmon	Mount Lemmon Survey	·	1.0 km	MPC · JPL
852429	2008 SQ_{356}	—	September 24, 2008	Kitt Peak	Spacewatch	(1547)	1.1 km	MPC · JPL
852430	2008 SX_{356}	—	September 23, 2008	Kitt Peak	Spacewatch	(5)	830 m	MPC · JPL
852431	2008 SO_{357}	—	September 24, 2008	Kitt Peak	Spacewatch	·	1.3 km	MPC · JPL
852432	2008 SQ_{357}	—	May 20, 2015	Cerro Tololo	DECam	·	680 m	MPC · JPL
852433	2008 SM_{361}	—	September 23, 2008	Kitt Peak	Spacewatch	V	440 m	MPC · JPL
852434	2008 SG_{365}	—	September 25, 2008	Kitt Peak	Spacewatch	·	1.5 km	MPC · JPL
852435	2008 TJ_{4}	—	October 3, 2008	Mount Lemmon	Mount Lemmon Survey	·	870 m	MPC · JPL
852436	2008 TO_{8}	—	October 4, 2008	La Sagra	OAM	H	450 m	MPC · JPL
852437	2008 TW_{8}	—	September 19, 2008	Kitt Peak	Spacewatch	·	1.8 km	MPC · JPL
852438	2008 TD_{10}	—	September 4, 2008	Kitt Peak	Spacewatch	DOR	1.7 km	MPC · JPL
852439	2008 TU_{10}	—	August 29, 2008	La Sagra	OAM	·	770 m	MPC · JPL
852440	2008 TA_{14}	—	October 1, 2008	Mount Lemmon	Mount Lemmon Survey	·	1.1 km	MPC · JPL
852441	2008 TU_{14}	—	October 1, 2008	Mount Lemmon	Mount Lemmon Survey	·	1.1 km	MPC · JPL
852442	2008 TB_{15}	—	October 1, 2008	Mount Lemmon	Mount Lemmon Survey	·	1.8 km	MPC · JPL
852443	2008 TD_{15}	—	October 1, 2008	Mount Lemmon	Mount Lemmon Survey	·	1.6 km	MPC · JPL
852444	2008 TP_{15}	—	September 2, 2008	Kitt Peak	Spacewatch	·	540 m	MPC · JPL
852445	2008 TT_{17}	—	September 22, 2008	Mount Lemmon	Mount Lemmon Survey	·	530 m	MPC · JPL
852446	2008 TD_{18}	—	October 1, 2008	Mount Lemmon	Mount Lemmon Survey	·	1.2 km	MPC · JPL
852447	2008 TC_{19}	—	October 1, 2008	Mount Lemmon	Mount Lemmon Survey	·	1.9 km	MPC · JPL
852448	2008 TR_{25}	—	September 10, 2008	Kitt Peak	Spacewatch	·	770 m	MPC · JPL
852449	2008 TL_{27}	—	September 20, 2008	Mount Lemmon	Mount Lemmon Survey	MAS	540 m	MPC · JPL
852450	2008 TP_{27}	—	October 2, 2008	Catalina	CSS	·	400 m	MPC · JPL
852451	2008 TT_{32}	—	October 1, 2008	Kitt Peak	Spacewatch	·	1.9 km	MPC · JPL
852452	2008 TU_{36}	—	October 1, 2008	Catalina	CSS	·	1.6 km	MPC · JPL
852453	2008 TR_{37}	—	September 4, 2008	Kitt Peak	Spacewatch	·	480 m	MPC · JPL
852454	2008 TN_{40}	—	November 30, 2003	Kitt Peak	Spacewatch	·	1.7 km	MPC · JPL
852455	2008 TJ_{42}	—	October 1, 2008	Mount Lemmon	Mount Lemmon Survey	·	520 m	MPC · JPL
852456	2008 TX_{42}	—	October 1, 2008	Mount Lemmon	Mount Lemmon Survey	·	1.3 km	MPC · JPL
852457	2008 TA_{43}	—	October 1, 2008	Mount Lemmon	Mount Lemmon Survey	·	2.4 km	MPC · JPL
852458	2008 TJ_{43}	—	October 1, 2008	Mount Lemmon	Mount Lemmon Survey	H	460 m	MPC · JPL
852459	2008 TP_{43}	—	October 1, 2008	Mount Lemmon	Mount Lemmon Survey	·	500 m	MPC · JPL
852460	2008 TD_{45}	—	October 1, 2008	Mount Lemmon	Mount Lemmon Survey	EUN	810 m	MPC · JPL
852461	2008 TB_{48}	—	October 1, 2008	Kitt Peak	Spacewatch	·	1.3 km	MPC · JPL
852462	2008 TC_{50}	—	September 24, 2008	Kitt Peak	Spacewatch	·	2.5 km	MPC · JPL
852463	2008 TQ_{52}	—	September 24, 2008	Kitt Peak	Spacewatch	NYS	840 m	MPC · JPL
852464	2008 TF_{53}	—	October 2, 2008	Kitt Peak	Spacewatch	·	750 m	MPC · JPL
852465	2008 TO_{60}	—	September 22, 2008	Mount Lemmon	Mount Lemmon Survey	·	920 m	MPC · JPL
852466	2008 TP_{60}	—	September 22, 2008	Mount Lemmon	Mount Lemmon Survey	MAS	470 m	MPC · JPL
852467	2008 TD_{64}	—	September 22, 2008	Mount Lemmon	Mount Lemmon Survey	JUN	590 m	MPC · JPL
852468	2008 TL_{64}	—	October 2, 2008	Kitt Peak	Spacewatch	·	1.2 km	MPC · JPL
852469	2008 TP_{67}	—	October 2, 2008	Kitt Peak	Spacewatch	·	1.4 km	MPC · JPL
852470	2008 TQ_{69}	—	October 2, 2008	Kitt Peak	Spacewatch	PHO	570 m	MPC · JPL
852471	2008 TM_{70}	—	October 2, 2008	Kitt Peak	Spacewatch	MIS	1.8 km	MPC · JPL
852472	2008 TV_{70}	—	October 2, 2008	Kitt Peak	Spacewatch	·	520 m	MPC · JPL
852473	2008 TO_{75}	—	October 2, 2008	Kitt Peak	Spacewatch	HYG	2.0 km	MPC · JPL
852474	2008 TH_{78}	—	September 2, 2008	Kitt Peak	Spacewatch	·	1.4 km	MPC · JPL
852475	2008 TX_{83}	—	September 25, 2008	Kitt Peak	Spacewatch	NEM	1.6 km	MPC · JPL
852476	2008 TC_{85}	—	October 3, 2008	Mount Lemmon	Mount Lemmon Survey	V	400 m	MPC · JPL
852477	2008 TP_{86}	—	September 2, 2008	Kitt Peak	Spacewatch	·	730 m	MPC · JPL
852478	2008 TR_{87}	—	October 3, 2008	Kitt Peak	Spacewatch	·	930 m	MPC · JPL
852479	2008 TO_{88}	—	September 20, 2008	Kitt Peak	Spacewatch	·	2.1 km	MPC · JPL
852480	2008 TR_{88}	—	October 3, 2008	Mount Lemmon	Mount Lemmon Survey	·	920 m	MPC · JPL
852481	2008 TM_{89}	—	September 6, 2008	Mount Lemmon	Mount Lemmon Survey	·	890 m	MPC · JPL
852482	2008 TH_{90}	—	October 3, 2008	Kitt Peak	Spacewatch	MAS	630 m	MPC · JPL
852483	2008 TR_{92}	—	September 23, 2008	Mount Lemmon	Mount Lemmon Survey	·	780 m	MPC · JPL
852484	2008 TU_{94}	—	September 23, 2008	Mount Lemmon	Mount Lemmon Survey	·	570 m	MPC · JPL
852485	2008 TX_{96}	—	September 4, 2008	Kitt Peak	Spacewatch	HNS	930 m	MPC · JPL
852486	2008 TB_{97}	—	September 5, 2008	Kitt Peak	Spacewatch	·	400 m	MPC · JPL
852487	2008 TP_{98}	—	September 24, 2008	Kitt Peak	Spacewatch	MIS	1.9 km	MPC · JPL
852488	2008 TQ_{99}	—	October 6, 2008	Kitt Peak	Spacewatch	·	480 m	MPC · JPL
852489	2008 TM_{100}	—	October 6, 2008	Catalina	CSS	·	1.5 km	MPC · JPL
852490	2008 TN_{101}	—	September 24, 2008	Kitt Peak	Spacewatch	·	2.1 km	MPC · JPL
852491	2008 TZ_{101}	—	September 20, 2008	Kitt Peak	Spacewatch	MAS	540 m	MPC · JPL
852492	2008 TA_{102}	—	September 20, 2008	Kitt Peak	Spacewatch	·	1 km	MPC · JPL
852493	2008 TL_{103}	—	October 6, 2008	Kitt Peak	Spacewatch	·	890 m	MPC · JPL
852494	2008 TC_{105}	—	September 26, 2008	Kitt Peak	Spacewatch	·	1.3 km	MPC · JPL
852495	2008 TH_{106}	—	October 2, 2008	Kitt Peak	Spacewatch	·	1.3 km	MPC · JPL
852496	2008 TB_{108}	—	September 26, 2008	Kitt Peak	Spacewatch	·	510 m	MPC · JPL
852497	2008 TM_{111}	—	October 6, 2008	Catalina	CSS	·	1.4 km	MPC · JPL
852498	2008 TV_{111}	—	October 6, 2008	Catalina	CSS	·	1.3 km	MPC · JPL
852499	2008 TC_{114}	—	September 23, 2008	Kitt Peak	Spacewatch	·	920 m	MPC · JPL
852500	2008 TZ_{116}	—	October 6, 2008	Mount Lemmon	Mount Lemmon Survey	·	490 m	MPC · JPL

== 852501–852600 ==
back to top

Designation			Discovery			Properties		Ref
Permanent	Provisional	Named after	Date	Site	Discoverer(s)	Category	Diam.	Ref
852501	2008 TJ_{117}	—	October 6, 2008	Mount Lemmon	Mount Lemmon Survey	·	1.1 km	MPC · JPL
852502	2008 TG_{119}	—	September 19, 2008	Kitt Peak	Spacewatch	·	1.1 km	MPC · JPL
852503	2008 TC_{120}	—	September 9, 2008	Mount Lemmon	Mount Lemmon Survey	(2076)	480 m	MPC · JPL
852504	2008 TO_{122}	—	September 7, 2008	Mount Lemmon	Mount Lemmon Survey	·	1.3 km	MPC · JPL
852505	2008 TV_{123}	—	October 8, 2008	Kitt Peak	Spacewatch	·	1.9 km	MPC · JPL
852506	2008 TT_{125}	—	October 8, 2008	Mount Lemmon	Mount Lemmon Survey	THB	1.8 km	MPC · JPL
852507	2008 TW_{125}	—	September 24, 2008	Mount Lemmon	Mount Lemmon Survey	H	360 m	MPC · JPL
852508	2008 TW_{126}	—	October 6, 2008	Kitt Peak	Spacewatch	·	2.2 km	MPC · JPL
852509	2008 TA_{127}	—	October 8, 2008	Mount Lemmon	Mount Lemmon Survey	·	700 m	MPC · JPL
852510	2008 TW_{127}	—	October 8, 2008	Mount Lemmon	Mount Lemmon Survey	·	2.0 km	MPC · JPL
852511	2008 TR_{131}	—	October 8, 2008	Mount Lemmon	Mount Lemmon Survey	·	2.1 km	MPC · JPL
852512	2008 TZ_{131}	—	October 8, 2008	Mount Lemmon	Mount Lemmon Survey	·	870 m	MPC · JPL
852513	2008 TE_{133}	—	October 8, 2008	Mount Lemmon	Mount Lemmon Survey	·	1.4 km	MPC · JPL
852514	2008 TL_{133}	—	October 8, 2008	Mount Lemmon	Mount Lemmon Survey	·	550 m	MPC · JPL
852515	2008 TH_{134}	—	October 8, 2008	Mount Lemmon	Mount Lemmon Survey	·	1.0 km	MPC · JPL
852516	2008 TR_{134}	—	October 8, 2008	Kitt Peak	Spacewatch	·	2.1 km	MPC · JPL
852517	2008 TF_{135}	—	September 6, 2008	Mount Lemmon	Mount Lemmon Survey	·	1.8 km	MPC · JPL
852518	2008 TB_{137}	—	October 8, 2008	Kitt Peak	Spacewatch	·	2.4 km	MPC · JPL
852519	2008 TX_{137}	—	October 8, 2008	Mount Lemmon	Mount Lemmon Survey	·	1.3 km	MPC · JPL
852520	2008 TC_{138}	—	October 8, 2008	Mount Lemmon	Mount Lemmon Survey	PHO	560 m	MPC · JPL
852521	2008 TL_{138}	—	September 23, 2008	Kitt Peak	Spacewatch	·	740 m	MPC · JPL
852522	2008 TG_{145}	—	October 9, 2008	Mount Lemmon	Mount Lemmon Survey	·	2.0 km	MPC · JPL
852523	2008 TB_{147}	—	October 9, 2008	Mount Lemmon	Mount Lemmon Survey	PHO	600 m	MPC · JPL
852524	2008 TC_{147}	—	October 9, 2008	Mount Lemmon	Mount Lemmon Survey	·	2.1 km	MPC · JPL
852525	2008 TL_{149}	—	September 28, 2008	Mount Lemmon	Mount Lemmon Survey	·	1.9 km	MPC · JPL
852526	2008 TP_{149}	—	September 2, 2008	Kitt Peak	Spacewatch	·	980 m	MPC · JPL
852527	2008 TU_{152}	—	September 3, 2008	Kitt Peak	Spacewatch	·	1.8 km	MPC · JPL
852528	2008 TL_{153}	—	October 9, 2008	Mount Lemmon	Mount Lemmon Survey	EOS	1.3 km	MPC · JPL
852529	2008 TG_{154}	—	October 9, 2008	Mount Lemmon	Mount Lemmon Survey	·	2.1 km	MPC · JPL
852530	2008 TQ_{155}	—	October 9, 2008	Mount Lemmon	Mount Lemmon Survey	·	2.1 km	MPC · JPL
852531	2008 TZ_{155}	—	October 9, 2008	Mount Lemmon	Mount Lemmon Survey	·	1.1 km	MPC · JPL
852532	2008 TN_{160}	—	October 1, 2008	Kitt Peak	Spacewatch	·	1.3 km	MPC · JPL
852533	2008 TV_{168}	—	October 3, 2008	Mount Lemmon	Mount Lemmon Survey	·	1.4 km	MPC · JPL
852534	2008 TY_{169}	—	October 8, 2008	Mount Lemmon	Mount Lemmon Survey	·	1.1 km	MPC · JPL
852535	2008 TC_{170}	—	October 8, 2008	Kitt Peak	Spacewatch	·	2.6 km	MPC · JPL
852536	2008 TT_{171}	—	October 6, 2008	Kitt Peak	Spacewatch	NYS	720 m	MPC · JPL
852537	2008 TD_{173}	—	October 2, 2008	Kitt Peak	Spacewatch	·	950 m	MPC · JPL
852538	2008 TC_{176}	—	October 10, 2008	Kitt Peak	Spacewatch	URS	2.4 km	MPC · JPL
852539	2008 TG_{176}	—	October 6, 2008	Kitt Peak	Spacewatch	·	1.0 km	MPC · JPL
852540	2008 TR_{179}	—	October 1, 2008	Catalina	CSS	·	550 m	MPC · JPL
852541	2008 TN_{180}	—	September 9, 2021	Haleakala	Pan-STARRS 2	·	1.3 km	MPC · JPL
852542	2008 TY_{181}	—	October 1, 2008	Kitt Peak	Spacewatch	KON	1.4 km	MPC · JPL
852543	2008 TH_{182}	—	October 1, 2008	Kitt Peak	Spacewatch	·	1.0 km	MPC · JPL
852544	2008 TK_{184}	—	October 6, 2008	Kitt Peak	Spacewatch	·	2.1 km	MPC · JPL
852545	2008 TR_{186}	—	October 8, 2008	Kitt Peak	Spacewatch	MAS	470 m	MPC · JPL
852546	2008 TC_{188}	—	October 9, 2008	Kitt Peak	Spacewatch	·	970 m	MPC · JPL
852547	2008 TJ_{188}	—	October 9, 2008	Mount Lemmon	Mount Lemmon Survey	HNS	660 m	MPC · JPL
852548	2008 TK_{188}	—	October 9, 2008	Mount Lemmon	Mount Lemmon Survey	·	1.6 km	MPC · JPL
852549	2008 TZ_{191}	—	October 6, 2008	Mount Lemmon	Mount Lemmon Survey	·	2.2 km	MPC · JPL
852550	2008 TL_{194}	—	October 1, 2008	Kitt Peak	Spacewatch	·	1.5 km	MPC · JPL
852551	2008 TD_{197}	—	October 8, 2008	Kitt Peak	Spacewatch	·	1.5 km	MPC · JPL
852552	2008 TT_{197}	—	October 1, 2008	Mount Lemmon	Mount Lemmon Survey	·	1.1 km	MPC · JPL
852553	2008 TH_{198}	—	April 15, 2012	Haleakala	Pan-STARRS 1	·	1.7 km	MPC · JPL
852554	2008 TT_{198}	—	October 2, 2008	Kitt Peak	Spacewatch	·	1.0 km	MPC · JPL
852555	2008 TC_{199}	—	September 23, 2017	Haleakala	Pan-STARRS 1	·	1.2 km	MPC · JPL
852556	2008 TG_{199}	—	October 6, 2008	Mount Lemmon	Mount Lemmon Survey	·	1.4 km	MPC · JPL
852557	2008 TC_{200}	—	October 2, 2008	Mount Lemmon	Mount Lemmon Survey	·	830 m	MPC · JPL
852558	2008 TS_{201}	—	October 2, 2008	Mount Lemmon	Mount Lemmon Survey	·	2.1 km	MPC · JPL
852559	2008 TW_{201}	—	October 8, 2008	Mount Lemmon	Mount Lemmon Survey	·	390 m	MPC · JPL
852560	2008 TB_{202}	—	January 20, 2016	Haleakala	Pan-STARRS 1	·	2.3 km	MPC · JPL
852561	2008 TX_{202}	—	October 2, 2008	Mount Lemmon	Mount Lemmon Survey	·	2.0 km	MPC · JPL
852562	2008 TK_{203}	—	October 1, 2008	Mount Lemmon	Mount Lemmon Survey	·	1.1 km	MPC · JPL
852563	2008 TM_{203}	—	October 7, 2008	Kitt Peak	Spacewatch	(3460)	1.8 km	MPC · JPL
852564	2008 TO_{203}	—	October 2, 2008	Kitt Peak	Spacewatch	·	720 m	MPC · JPL
852565	2008 TS_{203}	—	October 6, 2008	Mount Lemmon	Mount Lemmon Survey	·	1.9 km	MPC · JPL
852566	2008 TH_{204}	—	October 8, 2008	Mount Lemmon	Mount Lemmon Survey	T_{j} (2.99)	2.5 km	MPC · JPL
852567	2008 TO_{204}	—	October 6, 2008	Catalina	CSS	·	2.8 km	MPC · JPL
852568	2008 TU_{205}	—	October 7, 2008	Kitt Peak	Spacewatch	H	350 m	MPC · JPL
852569	2008 TK_{206}	—	November 26, 2014	Haleakala	Pan-STARRS 1	·	2.1 km	MPC · JPL
852570	2008 TZ_{206}	—	October 8, 2008	Mount Lemmon	Mount Lemmon Survey	·	1.8 km	MPC · JPL
852571	2008 TN_{207}	—	August 24, 2008	Kitt Peak	Spacewatch	·	1.4 km	MPC · JPL
852572	2008 TB_{208}	—	February 25, 2011	Mount Lemmon	Mount Lemmon Survey	ELF	2.1 km	MPC · JPL
852573	2008 TO_{208}	—	November 17, 2014	Haleakala	Pan-STARRS 1	EOS	1.4 km	MPC · JPL
852574	2008 TT_{208}	—	October 7, 2008	Mount Lemmon	Mount Lemmon Survey	EOS	1.3 km	MPC · JPL
852575	2008 TU_{208}	—	October 6, 2008	Kitt Peak	Spacewatch	THM	1.5 km	MPC · JPL
852576	2008 TC_{209}	—	October 9, 2008	Kitt Peak	Spacewatch	(5)	1.0 km	MPC · JPL
852577	2008 TX_{209}	—	March 26, 2017	Mount Lemmon	Mount Lemmon Survey	·	1.8 km	MPC · JPL
852578	2008 TG_{210}	—	October 8, 2008	Mount Lemmon	Mount Lemmon Survey	·	560 m	MPC · JPL
852579	2008 TW_{210}	—	October 7, 2008	Kitt Peak	Spacewatch	·	1.2 km	MPC · JPL
852580	2008 TT_{211}	—	February 22, 2017	Haleakala	Pan-STARRS 1	·	620 m	MPC · JPL
852581	2008 TB_{212}	—	March 14, 2012	Mount Lemmon	Mount Lemmon Survey	·	2.4 km	MPC · JPL
852582	2008 TD_{212}	—	November 27, 2013	Haleakala	Pan-STARRS 1	AEO	780 m	MPC · JPL
852583	2008 TS_{212}	—	October 9, 2008	Mount Lemmon	Mount Lemmon Survey	·	1.9 km	MPC · JPL
852584	2008 TU_{212}	—	December 25, 2017	Haleakala	Pan-STARRS 1	HNS	610 m	MPC · JPL
852585	2008 TV_{212}	—	April 23, 2014	Haleakala	Pan-STARRS 1	·	440 m	MPC · JPL
852586	2008 TN_{213}	—	October 14, 2014	Mount Lemmon	Mount Lemmon Survey	·	2.2 km	MPC · JPL
852587	2008 TP_{213}	—	October 10, 2008	Mount Lemmon	Mount Lemmon Survey	·	2.1 km	MPC · JPL
852588	2008 TZ_{213}	—	October 25, 2014	Haleakala	Pan-STARRS 1	HYG	1.9 km	MPC · JPL
852589	2008 TW_{214}	—	October 25, 2014	Mount Lemmon	Mount Lemmon Survey	·	2.0 km	MPC · JPL
852590	2008 TX_{214}	—	July 28, 2015	Haleakala	Pan-STARRS 1	MAS	600 m	MPC · JPL
852591	2008 TN_{215}	—	October 1, 2008	Mount Lemmon	Mount Lemmon Survey	·	2.2 km	MPC · JPL
852592	2008 TS_{215}	—	February 7, 2011	Mount Lemmon	Mount Lemmon Survey	·	2.2 km	MPC · JPL
852593	2008 TK_{216}	—	October 8, 2008	Mount Lemmon	Mount Lemmon Survey	·	1.3 km	MPC · JPL
852594	2008 TC_{218}	—	October 8, 2008	Kitt Peak	Spacewatch	·	750 m	MPC · JPL
852595	2008 TM_{218}	—	October 1, 2008	Mount Lemmon	Mount Lemmon Survey	·	2.0 km	MPC · JPL
852596	2008 TQ_{218}	—	October 6, 2008	Kitt Peak	Spacewatch	·	2.1 km	MPC · JPL
852597	2008 TT_{218}	—	October 1, 2008	Mount Lemmon	Mount Lemmon Survey	VER	1.9 km	MPC · JPL
852598	2008 TV_{218}	—	October 1, 2008	Mount Lemmon	Mount Lemmon Survey	THM	1.3 km	MPC · JPL
852599	2008 TZ_{218}	—	October 1, 2008	Mount Lemmon	Mount Lemmon Survey	H	390 m	MPC · JPL
852600	2008 TE_{222}	—	October 9, 2008	Mount Lemmon	Mount Lemmon Survey	·	1.1 km	MPC · JPL

== 852601–852700 ==
back to top

Designation			Discovery			Properties		Ref
Permanent	Provisional	Named after	Date	Site	Discoverer(s)	Category	Diam.	Ref
852601	2008 TL_{222}	—	October 6, 2008	Kitt Peak	Spacewatch	L4	5.8 km	MPC · JPL
852602	2008 TZ_{222}	—	October 1, 2008	Kitt Peak	Spacewatch	·	1.1 km	MPC · JPL
852603	2008 TF_{223}	—	October 1, 2008	Mount Lemmon	Mount Lemmon Survey	·	2.2 km	MPC · JPL
852604	2008 TA_{225}	—	October 6, 2008	Kitt Peak	Spacewatch	·	2.2 km	MPC · JPL
852605	2008 TD_{225}	—	October 3, 2008	Mount Lemmon	Mount Lemmon Survey	L4	5.6 km	MPC · JPL
852606	2008 TH_{225}	—	October 7, 2008	Mount Lemmon	Mount Lemmon Survey	·	2.0 km	MPC · JPL
852607	2008 TS_{226}	—	October 6, 2008	Mount Lemmon	Mount Lemmon Survey	EOS	1.3 km	MPC · JPL
852608	2008 TL_{227}	—	October 6, 2008	Kitt Peak	Spacewatch	·	1.2 km	MPC · JPL
852609	2008 TP_{227}	—	October 8, 2008	Mount Lemmon	Mount Lemmon Survey	(5)	670 m	MPC · JPL
852610	2008 TO_{228}	—	October 1, 2008	Kitt Peak	Spacewatch	·	1.4 km	MPC · JPL
852611	2008 TB_{229}	—	October 3, 2008	Kitt Peak	Spacewatch	·	2.1 km	MPC · JPL
852612	2008 TG_{231}	—	October 6, 2008	Mount Lemmon	Mount Lemmon Survey	·	830 m	MPC · JPL
852613	2008 TV_{231}	—	October 10, 2008	Mount Lemmon	Mount Lemmon Survey	·	1.1 km	MPC · JPL
852614	2008 TO_{232}	—	October 8, 2008	Kitt Peak	Spacewatch	·	980 m	MPC · JPL
852615	2008 TA_{233}	—	October 1, 2008	Catalina	CSS	ADE	1.7 km	MPC · JPL
852616	2008 TB_{233}	—	October 2, 2008	Kitt Peak	Spacewatch	·	1.1 km	MPC · JPL
852617	2008 TQ_{233}	—	October 9, 2008	Mount Lemmon	Mount Lemmon Survey	MAR	700 m	MPC · JPL
852618	2008 TD_{234}	—	October 7, 2008	Mount Lemmon	Mount Lemmon Survey	(5)	1.1 km	MPC · JPL
852619	2008 TH_{235}	—	October 7, 2008	Mount Lemmon	Mount Lemmon Survey	·	530 m	MPC · JPL
852620	2008 TO_{235}	—	September 26, 2008	Kitt Peak	Spacewatch	·	770 m	MPC · JPL
852621	2008 TF_{236}	—	October 7, 2008	Mount Lemmon	Mount Lemmon Survey	ADE	960 m	MPC · JPL
852622	2008 TV_{236}	—	October 9, 2008	Mount Lemmon	Mount Lemmon Survey	·	1.1 km	MPC · JPL
852623	2008 TX_{236}	—	October 1, 2008	Mount Lemmon	Mount Lemmon Survey	·	720 m	MPC · JPL
852624	2008 TF_{237}	—	October 4, 2008	La Sagra	OAM	·	930 m	MPC · JPL
852625	2008 TE_{239}	—	October 10, 2008	Mount Lemmon	Mount Lemmon Survey	·	480 m	MPC · JPL
852626	2008 TP_{239}	—	October 9, 2008	Mount Lemmon	Mount Lemmon Survey	·	1.6 km	MPC · JPL
852627	2008 TS_{239}	—	October 8, 2008	Kitt Peak	Spacewatch	·	2.1 km	MPC · JPL
852628	2008 TA_{240}	—	October 9, 2008	Kitt Peak	Spacewatch	V	430 m	MPC · JPL
852629	2008 TQ_{240}	—	October 1, 2008	Kitt Peak	Spacewatch	3:2 · SHU	3.1 km	MPC · JPL
852630	2008 TB_{243}	—	October 7, 2008	Mount Lemmon	Mount Lemmon Survey	·	1.1 km	MPC · JPL
852631	2008 TD_{243}	—	October 8, 2008	Mount Lemmon	Mount Lemmon Survey	·	2.3 km	MPC · JPL
852632	2008 TF_{243}	—	October 9, 2008	Mount Lemmon	Mount Lemmon Survey	·	2.1 km	MPC · JPL
852633	2008 UP_{4}	—	October 23, 2008	Modra	Gajdoš, S.	·	1.2 km	MPC · JPL
852634	2008 UL_{9}	—	September 4, 2008	Kitt Peak	Spacewatch	·	2.0 km	MPC · JPL
852635	2008 UM_{9}	—	September 19, 2008	Kitt Peak	Spacewatch	·	1.4 km	MPC · JPL
852636	2008 UV_{13}	—	September 25, 2008	Kitt Peak	Spacewatch	·	1.1 km	MPC · JPL
852637	2008 UN_{14}	—	September 30, 2008	La Sagra	OAM	·	520 m	MPC · JPL
852638	2008 UJ_{18}	—	October 19, 2008	Kitt Peak	Spacewatch	·	1.1 km	MPC · JPL
852639	2008 UN_{18}	—	October 2, 2008	Kitt Peak	Spacewatch	·	1.7 km	MPC · JPL
852640	2008 UZ_{18}	—	October 19, 2008	Kitt Peak	Spacewatch	·	920 m	MPC · JPL
852641	2008 UN_{19}	—	September 24, 2008	Kitt Peak	Spacewatch	·	510 m	MPC · JPL
852642	2008 UD_{20}	—	October 19, 2008	Kitt Peak	Spacewatch	(1547)	750 m	MPC · JPL
852643	2008 UN_{20}	—	August 23, 2004	Kitt Peak	Spacewatch	·	700 m	MPC · JPL
852644	2008 UY_{20}	—	September 29, 2008	Kitt Peak	Spacewatch	·	2.0 km	MPC · JPL
852645	2008 UQ_{22}	—	October 19, 2008	Kitt Peak	Spacewatch	·	1.1 km	MPC · JPL
852646	2008 UX_{25}	—	September 25, 2008	Kitt Peak	Spacewatch	·	790 m	MPC · JPL
852647	2008 UJ_{26}	—	September 24, 2008	Kitt Peak	Spacewatch	(2076)	500 m	MPC · JPL
852648	2008 UN_{30}	—	September 6, 2008	Mount Lemmon	Mount Lemmon Survey	THB	2.1 km	MPC · JPL
852649	2008 UA_{31}	—	October 20, 2008	Kitt Peak	Spacewatch	·	410 m	MPC · JPL
852650	2008 UJ_{31}	—	September 23, 2004	Kitt Peak	Spacewatch	MAS	510 m	MPC · JPL
852651	2008 UE_{34}	—	September 9, 2008	Mount Lemmon	Mount Lemmon Survey	·	1.5 km	MPC · JPL
852652	2008 UM_{35}	—	October 8, 2008	Kitt Peak	Spacewatch	·	500 m	MPC · JPL
852653	2008 UQ_{39}	—	October 8, 2008	Kitt Peak	Spacewatch	·	890 m	MPC · JPL
852654	2008 UV_{39}	—	October 1, 2008	Kitt Peak	Spacewatch	·	850 m	MPC · JPL
852655	2008 UN_{42}	—	October 20, 2008	Kitt Peak	Spacewatch	EUN	1.0 km	MPC · JPL
852656	2008 UX_{42}	—	October 20, 2008	Kitt Peak	Spacewatch	·	980 m	MPC · JPL
852657	2008 UE_{43}	—	October 8, 2008	Kitt Peak	Spacewatch	·	760 m	MPC · JPL
852658	2008 UZ_{43}	—	October 20, 2008	Mount Lemmon	Mount Lemmon Survey	PHO	700 m	MPC · JPL
852659	2008 UG_{44}	—	October 20, 2008	Mount Lemmon	Mount Lemmon Survey	WIT	730 m	MPC · JPL
852660	2008 UV_{45}	—	October 1, 2008	Kitt Peak	Spacewatch	PHO	820 m	MPC · JPL
852661	2008 UW_{53}	—	October 20, 2008	Mount Lemmon	Mount Lemmon Survey	·	820 m	MPC · JPL
852662	2008 UN_{61}	—	October 21, 2008	Kitt Peak	Spacewatch	·	550 m	MPC · JPL
852663	2008 UD_{64}	—	October 21, 2008	Kitt Peak	Spacewatch	·	1.0 km	MPC · JPL
852664	2008 UE_{64}	—	October 8, 2008	Kitt Peak	Spacewatch	(5)	1.0 km	MPC · JPL
852665	2008 UG_{68}	—	September 23, 2008	Mount Lemmon	Mount Lemmon Survey	·	1.0 km	MPC · JPL
852666	2008 UR_{69}	—	October 6, 2008	Mount Lemmon	Mount Lemmon Survey	·	2.2 km	MPC · JPL
852667	2008 UR_{70}	—	October 1, 2008	Kitt Peak	Spacewatch	·	1.1 km	MPC · JPL
852668	2008 UP_{72}	—	October 21, 2008	Mount Lemmon	Mount Lemmon Survey	(2076)	590 m	MPC · JPL
852669	2008 UQ_{73}	—	October 21, 2008	Kitt Peak	Spacewatch	·	2.0 km	MPC · JPL
852670	2008 UK_{74}	—	October 21, 2008	Kitt Peak	Spacewatch	·	1.1 km	MPC · JPL
852671	2008 UF_{76}	—	September 6, 2008	Mount Lemmon	Mount Lemmon Survey	·	960 m	MPC · JPL
852672	2008 UA_{82}	—	October 22, 2008	Kitt Peak	Spacewatch	H	440 m	MPC · JPL
852673	2008 UB_{82}	—	October 22, 2008	Kitt Peak	Spacewatch	JUN	640 m	MPC · JPL
852674	2008 UU_{84}	—	October 1, 2008	Mount Lemmon	Mount Lemmon Survey	·	1.7 km	MPC · JPL
852675	2008 UY_{86}	—	October 2, 2008	Kitt Peak	Spacewatch	T_{j} (2.98)	3.2 km	MPC · JPL
852676	2008 UD_{89}	—	October 10, 2008	Mount Lemmon	Mount Lemmon Survey	·	2.0 km	MPC · JPL
852677	2008 UQ_{95}	—	October 25, 2008	Piszkés-tető	K. Sárneczky, Á. Kárpáti	·	1.2 km	MPC · JPL
852678	2008 UZ_{96}	—	October 7, 2008	Catalina	CSS	THB	3.1 km	MPC · JPL
852679	2008 UW_{97}	—	October 27, 2008	Mount Lemmon	Mount Lemmon Survey	·	1.2 km	MPC · JPL
852680	2008 US_{102}	—	October 20, 2008	Kitt Peak	Spacewatch	·	1.4 km	MPC · JPL
852681	2008 UD_{104}	—	September 23, 2008	Kitt Peak	Spacewatch	·	1.9 km	MPC · JPL
852682	2008 UU_{104}	—	September 23, 2008	Kitt Peak	Spacewatch	·	950 m	MPC · JPL
852683	2008 UB_{106}	—	September 4, 2008	Kitt Peak	Spacewatch	·	1.4 km	MPC · JPL
852684	2008 UJ_{110}	—	October 1, 2008	Mount Lemmon	Mount Lemmon Survey	·	540 m	MPC · JPL
852685	2008 US_{116}	—	September 29, 2008	Mount Lemmon	Mount Lemmon Survey	·	900 m	MPC · JPL
852686	2008 UE_{117}	—	September 28, 2008	Mount Lemmon	Mount Lemmon Survey	THB	1.6 km	MPC · JPL
852687	2008 US_{117}	—	October 22, 2008	Kitt Peak	Spacewatch	·	2.0 km	MPC · JPL
852688	2008 UA_{118}	—	October 22, 2008	Kitt Peak	Spacewatch	·	1.3 km	MPC · JPL
852689	2008 UV_{118}	—	October 22, 2008	Kitt Peak	Spacewatch	·	900 m	MPC · JPL
852690	2008 UP_{122}	—	October 22, 2008	Kitt Peak	Spacewatch	·	370 m	MPC · JPL
852691	2008 UB_{126}	—	October 22, 2008	Kitt Peak	Spacewatch	·	550 m	MPC · JPL
852692	2008 UE_{130}	—	November 20, 2004	Kitt Peak	Spacewatch	(5)	820 m	MPC · JPL
852693	2008 UJ_{131}	—	October 23, 2008	Kitt Peak	Spacewatch	·	1.4 km	MPC · JPL
852694	2008 UE_{133}	—	October 23, 2008	Kitt Peak	Spacewatch	·	1 km	MPC · JPL
852695	2008 UR_{135}	—	October 23, 2008	Kitt Peak	Spacewatch	·	1.8 km	MPC · JPL
852696	2008 UQ_{137}	—	September 24, 2008	Mount Lemmon	Mount Lemmon Survey	·	1.8 km	MPC · JPL
852697	2008 UW_{138}	—	October 23, 2008	Kitt Peak	Spacewatch	·	1.0 km	MPC · JPL
852698	2008 UG_{143}	—	October 23, 2008	Kitt Peak	Spacewatch	·	800 m	MPC · JPL
852699	2008 UE_{144}	—	October 23, 2008	Kitt Peak	Spacewatch	·	940 m	MPC · JPL
852700	2008 UF_{145}	—	September 12, 2002	Palomar	NEAT	THM	1.7 km	MPC · JPL

== 852701–852800 ==
back to top

Designation			Discovery			Properties		Ref
Permanent	Provisional	Named after	Date	Site	Discoverer(s)	Category	Diam.	Ref
852701	2008 UK_{146}	—	October 23, 2008	Kitt Peak	Spacewatch	·	420 m	MPC · JPL
852702	2008 UN_{147}	—	October 23, 2008	Kitt Peak	Spacewatch	·	1.1 km	MPC · JPL
852703	2008 US_{148}	—	October 23, 2008	Kitt Peak	Spacewatch	·	630 m	MPC · JPL
852704	2008 UF_{150}	—	October 23, 2008	Mount Lemmon	Mount Lemmon Survey	·	550 m	MPC · JPL
852705	2008 UX_{150}	—	October 23, 2008	Mount Lemmon	Mount Lemmon Survey	·	420 m	MPC · JPL
852706	2008 UF_{153}	—	September 22, 2008	Mount Lemmon	Mount Lemmon Survey	·	1.5 km	MPC · JPL
852707	2008 UZ_{156}	—	October 23, 2008	Mount Lemmon	Mount Lemmon Survey	·	490 m	MPC · JPL
852708	2008 UH_{158}	—	October 23, 2008	Mount Lemmon	Mount Lemmon Survey	·	790 m	MPC · JPL
852709	2008 UR_{160}	—	October 23, 2008	Kitt Peak	Spacewatch	·	1.5 km	MPC · JPL
852710	2008 UB_{162}	—	October 24, 2008	Kitt Peak	Spacewatch	·	470 m	MPC · JPL
852711	2008 UV_{163}	—	October 24, 2008	Kitt Peak	Spacewatch	·	960 m	MPC · JPL
852712	2008 US_{165}	—	October 24, 2008	Kitt Peak	Spacewatch	KOR	1.2 km	MPC · JPL
852713	2008 UY_{165}	—	October 24, 2008	Kitt Peak	Spacewatch	THM	1.7 km	MPC · JPL
852714	2008 UC_{166}	—	October 24, 2008	Kitt Peak	Spacewatch	CLA	1.2 km	MPC · JPL
852715	2008 UN_{166}	—	October 2, 2008	Kitt Peak	Spacewatch	HNS	770 m	MPC · JPL
852716	2008 UP_{166}	—	September 26, 2008	Kitt Peak	Spacewatch	·	1.2 km	MPC · JPL
852717	2008 UY_{166}	—	October 6, 2008	Mount Lemmon	Mount Lemmon Survey	V	470 m	MPC · JPL
852718	2008 UG_{169}	—	October 24, 2008	Kitt Peak	Spacewatch	·	1.3 km	MPC · JPL
852719	2008 UR_{169}	—	October 24, 2008	Kitt Peak	Spacewatch	(5)	1 km	MPC · JPL
852720	2008 UN_{170}	—	October 9, 2008	Mount Lemmon	Mount Lemmon Survey	·	550 m	MPC · JPL
852721	2008 UH_{174}	—	October 24, 2008	Kitt Peak	Spacewatch	·	610 m	MPC · JPL
852722	2008 UN_{174}	—	October 24, 2008	Kitt Peak	Spacewatch	·	740 m	MPC · JPL
852723	2008 UF_{176}	—	October 8, 2008	Kitt Peak	Spacewatch	·	2.1 km	MPC · JPL
852724	2008 UD_{177}	—	October 24, 2008	Mount Lemmon	Mount Lemmon Survey	·	1.0 km	MPC · JPL
852725	2008 US_{178}	—	October 24, 2008	Mount Lemmon	Mount Lemmon Survey	·	1.4 km	MPC · JPL
852726	2008 UN_{179}	—	September 7, 2008	Mount Lemmon	Mount Lemmon Survey	·	850 m	MPC · JPL
852727	2008 UY_{181}	—	September 30, 2003	Kitt Peak	Spacewatch	GEF	650 m	MPC · JPL
852728	2008 UK_{183}	—	October 6, 2008	Kitt Peak	Spacewatch	·	470 m	MPC · JPL
852729	2008 UW_{184}	—	October 24, 2008	Kitt Peak	Spacewatch	·	980 m	MPC · JPL
852730	2008 UK_{186}	—	October 9, 2008	Mount Lemmon	Mount Lemmon Survey	·	950 m	MPC · JPL
852731	2008 UA_{189}	—	October 1, 2008	Mount Lemmon	Mount Lemmon Survey	·	980 m	MPC · JPL
852732	2008 UA_{190}	—	September 28, 2008	Mount Lemmon	Mount Lemmon Survey	NYS	840 m	MPC · JPL
852733	2008 UT_{190}	—	October 25, 2008	Kitt Peak	Spacewatch	·	1.0 km	MPC · JPL
852734	2008 UV_{191}	—	September 23, 2008	Kitt Peak	Spacewatch	LIX	2.9 km	MPC · JPL
852735	2008 UA_{195}	—	October 3, 2008	Mount Lemmon	Mount Lemmon Survey	·	1.5 km	MPC · JPL
852736	2008 UX_{196}	—	October 27, 2008	Kitt Peak	Spacewatch	HNS	800 m	MPC · JPL
852737	2008 UD_{206}	—	October 22, 2008	Kitt Peak	Spacewatch	H	340 m	MPC · JPL
852738	2008 UH_{210}	—	September 25, 2008	Kitt Peak	Spacewatch	(5)	880 m	MPC · JPL
852739	2008 UK_{211}	—	September 9, 2008	Mount Lemmon	Mount Lemmon Survey	·	1.4 km	MPC · JPL
852740	2008 UV_{211}	—	October 23, 2008	Kitt Peak	Spacewatch	·	1.2 km	MPC · JPL
852741	2008 UE_{212}	—	September 19, 2008	Kitt Peak	Spacewatch	MAS	550 m	MPC · JPL
852742	2008 UP_{214}	—	September 22, 2008	Kitt Peak	Spacewatch	·	1.5 km	MPC · JPL
852743	2008 UU_{215}	—	October 24, 2008	Kitt Peak	Spacewatch	·	1 km	MPC · JPL
852744	2008 UN_{216}	—	October 24, 2008	Kitt Peak	Spacewatch	·	2.4 km	MPC · JPL
852745	2008 UV_{218}	—	October 25, 2008	Kitt Peak	Spacewatch	·	1.9 km	MPC · JPL
852746	2008 UV_{220}	—	October 10, 2008	Catalina	CSS	JUN	830 m	MPC · JPL
852747	2008 US_{225}	—	October 25, 2008	Mount Lemmon	Mount Lemmon Survey	·	1.3 km	MPC · JPL
852748	2008 UO_{228}	—	June 13, 2008	Catalina	CSS	·	1.7 km	MPC · JPL
852749	2008 UV_{228}	—	October 25, 2008	Kitt Peak	Spacewatch	·	640 m	MPC · JPL
852750	2008 US_{235}	—	September 25, 2008	Kitt Peak	Spacewatch	·	860 m	MPC · JPL
852751	2008 UG_{236}	—	October 26, 2008	Kitt Peak	Spacewatch	·	820 m	MPC · JPL
852752	2008 UM_{236}	—	October 9, 2008	Mount Lemmon	Mount Lemmon Survey	·	1.3 km	MPC · JPL
852753	2008 UP_{237}	—	October 26, 2008	Kitt Peak	Spacewatch	·	1.2 km	MPC · JPL
852754	2008 US_{242}	—	October 26, 2008	Kitt Peak	Spacewatch	·	810 m	MPC · JPL
852755	2008 UB_{245}	—	October 26, 2008	Kitt Peak	Spacewatch	PHO	780 m	MPC · JPL
852756	2008 UD_{247}	—	October 26, 2008	Kitt Peak	Spacewatch	·	1.2 km	MPC · JPL
852757	2008 UU_{248}	—	October 26, 2008	Kitt Peak	Spacewatch	·	1.2 km	MPC · JPL
852758	2008 UJ_{250}	—	April 22, 2007	Mount Lemmon	Mount Lemmon Survey	·	2.3 km	MPC · JPL
852759	2008 UW_{251}	—	October 6, 2008	Mount Lemmon	Mount Lemmon Survey	PHO	740 m	MPC · JPL
852760	2008 UU_{252}	—	October 27, 2008	Kitt Peak	Spacewatch	·	460 m	MPC · JPL
852761	2008 UL_{255}	—	October 27, 2008	Kitt Peak	Spacewatch	THM	1.7 km	MPC · JPL
852762	2008 UP_{256}	—	October 27, 2008	Kitt Peak	Spacewatch	·	2.0 km	MPC · JPL
852763	2008 UA_{257}	—	October 27, 2008	Mount Lemmon	Mount Lemmon Survey	EUN	740 m	MPC · JPL
852764	2008 UX_{257}	—	October 27, 2008	Kitt Peak	Spacewatch	·	990 m	MPC · JPL
852765	2008 UW_{258}	—	October 27, 2008	Kitt Peak	Spacewatch	·	2.1 km	MPC · JPL
852766	2008 UW_{260}	—	October 27, 2008	Mount Lemmon	Mount Lemmon Survey	·	1.4 km	MPC · JPL
852767	2008 US_{262}	—	September 23, 2008	Mount Lemmon	Mount Lemmon Survey	·	710 m	MPC · JPL
852768	2008 UD_{263}	—	October 27, 2008	Kitt Peak	Spacewatch	·	410 m	MPC · JPL
852769	2008 UE_{265}	—	September 28, 2008	Mount Lemmon	Mount Lemmon Survey	·	1.0 km	MPC · JPL
852770	2008 UU_{265}	—	October 28, 2008	Kitt Peak	Spacewatch	·	450 m	MPC · JPL
852771	2008 UX_{265}	—	October 28, 2008	Kitt Peak	Spacewatch	·	1.2 km	MPC · JPL
852772	2008 UY_{268}	—	October 24, 2008	Kitt Peak	Spacewatch	HYG	2.1 km	MPC · JPL
852773	2008 UC_{269}	—	September 19, 1998	Sacramento Peak	SDSS	KOR	1.0 km	MPC · JPL
852774	2008 UX_{271}	—	October 20, 2008	Kitt Peak	Spacewatch	·	2.0 km	MPC · JPL
852775	2008 UP_{276}	—	September 29, 2008	Kitt Peak	Spacewatch	EUN	790 m	MPC · JPL
852776	2008 UQ_{276}	—	October 28, 2008	Mount Lemmon	Mount Lemmon Survey	V	450 m	MPC · JPL
852777	2008 US_{276}	—	September 7, 2008	Mount Lemmon	Mount Lemmon Survey	·	520 m	MPC · JPL
852778	2008 UQ_{277}	—	October 28, 2008	Mount Lemmon	Mount Lemmon Survey	·	1.1 km	MPC · JPL
852779	2008 UZ_{280}	—	October 28, 2008	Kitt Peak	Spacewatch	NYS	750 m	MPC · JPL
852780	2008 UR_{282}	—	October 28, 2008	Mount Lemmon	Mount Lemmon Survey	MAS	490 m	MPC · JPL
852781	2008 UY_{282}	—	September 26, 2008	Kitt Peak	Spacewatch	ELF	2.5 km	MPC · JPL
852782	2008 UJ_{284}	—	October 2, 2008	Kitt Peak	Spacewatch	·	1.7 km	MPC · JPL
852783	2008 UM_{284}	—	October 28, 2008	Mount Lemmon	Mount Lemmon Survey	MAS	560 m	MPC · JPL
852784	2008 UG_{286}	—	October 28, 2008	Mount Lemmon	Mount Lemmon Survey	3:2	3.4 km	MPC · JPL
852785	2008 UH_{287}	—	October 28, 2008	Mount Lemmon	Mount Lemmon Survey	·	1.4 km	MPC · JPL
852786	2008 UD_{292}	—	October 29, 2008	Kitt Peak	Spacewatch	·	780 m	MPC · JPL
852787	2008 UE_{292}	—	October 29, 2008	Kitt Peak	Spacewatch	EUN	720 m	MPC · JPL
852788	2008 UR_{294}	—	October 21, 2008	Kitt Peak	Spacewatch	·	1.8 km	MPC · JPL
852789	2008 UX_{294}	—	October 2, 2008	Kitt Peak	Spacewatch	·	1.2 km	MPC · JPL
852790	2008 UX_{295}	—	October 2, 2008	Mount Lemmon	Mount Lemmon Survey	·	1.9 km	MPC · JPL
852791	2008 UO_{296}	—	October 29, 2008	Kitt Peak	Spacewatch	·	820 m	MPC · JPL
852792	2008 UF_{297}	—	October 21, 2008	Kitt Peak	Spacewatch	·	2.1 km	MPC · JPL
852793	2008 UF_{299}	—	October 29, 2008	Kitt Peak	Spacewatch	·	2.0 km	MPC · JPL
852794	2008 UH_{302}	—	October 29, 2008	Kitt Peak	Spacewatch	·	950 m	MPC · JPL
852795	2008 UL_{305}	—	October 17, 2008	Kitt Peak	Spacewatch	·	510 m	MPC · JPL
852796	2008 UO_{305}	—	October 30, 2008	Kitt Peak	Spacewatch	H	390 m	MPC · JPL
852797	2008 UT_{305}	—	October 9, 2008	Kitt Peak	Spacewatch	·	2.2 km	MPC · JPL
852798	2008 UE_{309}	—	October 30, 2008	Catalina	CSS	·	570 m	MPC · JPL
852799	2008 UE_{310}	—	October 30, 2008	Catalina	CSS	·	2.2 km	MPC · JPL
852800	2008 UP_{311}	—	October 26, 2008	Kitt Peak	Spacewatch	·	1.6 km	MPC · JPL

== 852801–852900 ==
back to top

Designation			Discovery			Properties		Ref
Permanent	Provisional	Named after	Date	Site	Discoverer(s)	Category	Diam.	Ref
852801	2008 UA_{318}	—	September 24, 2008	Kitt Peak	Spacewatch	(2076)	540 m	MPC · JPL
852802	2008 UD_{319}	—	October 10, 2008	Mount Lemmon	Mount Lemmon Survey	·	2.0 km	MPC · JPL
852803	2008 UL_{322}	—	September 28, 2008	Mount Lemmon	Mount Lemmon Survey	·	720 m	MPC · JPL
852804	2008 UW_{325}	—	October 10, 2008	Catalina	CSS	·	810 m	MPC · JPL
852805	2008 UB_{326}	—	October 31, 2008	Mount Lemmon	Mount Lemmon Survey	·	2.2 km	MPC · JPL
852806	2008 UY_{327}	—	October 8, 2008	Mount Lemmon	Mount Lemmon Survey	·	1.1 km	MPC · JPL
852807	2008 UH_{328}	—	October 8, 2008	Mount Lemmon	Mount Lemmon Survey	LIX	2.6 km	MPC · JPL
852808	2008 UY_{328}	—	October 30, 2008	Mount Lemmon	Mount Lemmon Survey	·	1.3 km	MPC · JPL
852809	2008 UG_{329}	—	November 12, 2001	Sacramento Peak	SDSS	·	550 m	MPC · JPL
852810	2008 UU_{336}	—	October 24, 2008	Kitt Peak	Spacewatch	·	1.7 km	MPC · JPL
852811	2008 UP_{337}	—	October 24, 2008	Kitt Peak	Spacewatch	·	440 m	MPC · JPL
852812	2008 UL_{339}	—	October 23, 2008	Kitt Peak	Spacewatch	·	550 m	MPC · JPL
852813	2008 UO_{339}	—	October 23, 2008	Kitt Peak	Spacewatch	·	2.3 km	MPC · JPL
852814	2008 UN_{341}	—	October 26, 2008	Kitt Peak	Spacewatch	EUN	730 m	MPC · JPL
852815	2008 UH_{353}	—	October 22, 2008	Kitt Peak	Spacewatch	LIX	2.7 km	MPC · JPL
852816	2008 UC_{355}	—	October 31, 2008	Kitt Peak	Spacewatch	·	2.0 km	MPC · JPL
852817	2008 UO_{359}	—	October 28, 2008	Kitt Peak	Spacewatch	THM	1.5 km	MPC · JPL
852818	2008 UQ_{359}	—	October 28, 2008	Kitt Peak	Spacewatch	·	770 m	MPC · JPL
852819	2008 UX_{363}	—	September 30, 2008	Mount Lemmon	Mount Lemmon Survey	·	920 m	MPC · JPL
852820	2008 UZ_{364}	—	September 30, 2008	Mount Lemmon	Mount Lemmon Survey	THB	2.7 km	MPC · JPL
852821	2008 UF_{379}	—	October 30, 2008	Kitt Peak	Spacewatch	·	2.0 km	MPC · JPL
852822	2008 UU_{379}	—	October 20, 2008	Kitt Peak	Spacewatch	·	1.0 km	MPC · JPL
852823	2008 UW_{379}	—	October 29, 2008	Kitt Peak	Spacewatch	·	1.2 km	MPC · JPL
852824	2008 UO_{380}	—	October 26, 2008	Mount Lemmon	Mount Lemmon Survey	·	1.2 km	MPC · JPL
852825	2008 UQ_{380}	—	June 11, 2015	Haleakala	Pan-STARRS 1	EUN	820 m	MPC · JPL
852826	2008 UJ_{383}	—	July 14, 2016	Mount Lemmon	Mount Lemmon Survey	·	1.3 km	MPC · JPL
852827	2008 UK_{383}	—	October 22, 2008	Kitt Peak	Spacewatch	·	840 m	MPC · JPL
852828	2008 UX_{384}	—	October 25, 2008	Kitt Peak	Spacewatch	·	610 m	MPC · JPL
852829	2008 UB_{385}	—	October 29, 2008	Mount Lemmon	Mount Lemmon Survey	H	340 m	MPC · JPL
852830	2008 UD_{385}	—	October 28, 2008	Kitt Peak	Spacewatch	·	960 m	MPC · JPL
852831	2008 UQ_{385}	—	January 10, 2014	Mount Lemmon	Mount Lemmon Survey	ADE	1.3 km	MPC · JPL
852832	2008 US_{385}	—	October 24, 2008	Kitt Peak	Spacewatch	V	370 m	MPC · JPL
852833	2008 UZ_{385}	—	October 28, 2008	Kitt Peak	Spacewatch	·	500 m	MPC · JPL
852834	2008 UK_{386}	—	October 23, 2008	Kitt Peak	Spacewatch	HNS	740 m	MPC · JPL
852835	2008 UP_{386}	—	October 26, 2008	Kitt Peak	Spacewatch	TIR	1.7 km	MPC · JPL
852836	2008 UA_{388}	—	October 26, 2008	Kitt Peak	Spacewatch	HYG	2.1 km	MPC · JPL
852837	2008 UL_{388}	—	October 29, 2008	Mount Lemmon	Mount Lemmon Survey	·	1.2 km	MPC · JPL
852838	2008 UN_{388}	—	October 24, 2014	Kitt Peak	Spacewatch	·	2.3 km	MPC · JPL
852839	2008 UV_{390}	—	December 25, 2013	Kitt Peak	Spacewatch	·	1.0 km	MPC · JPL
852840	2008 UZ_{390}	—	April 20, 2017	Haleakala	Pan-STARRS 1	·	2.0 km	MPC · JPL
852841	2008 UK_{391}	—	October 23, 2008	Mount Lemmon	Mount Lemmon Survey	·	510 m	MPC · JPL
852842	2008 UU_{391}	—	August 9, 2013	Kitt Peak	Spacewatch	THM	1.8 km	MPC · JPL
852843	2008 UW_{391}	—	October 24, 2008	Kitt Peak	Spacewatch	·	2.3 km	MPC · JPL
852844	2008 UG_{392}	—	October 31, 2008	Mount Lemmon	Mount Lemmon Survey	·	2.5 km	MPC · JPL
852845	2008 UH_{392}	—	August 10, 2015	Haleakala	Pan-STARRS 2	V	450 m	MPC · JPL
852846	2008 UL_{392}	—	March 2, 2011	Kitt Peak	Spacewatch	·	2.5 km	MPC · JPL
852847	2008 UM_{392}	—	July 7, 2011	Mayhill-ISON	L. Elenin	·	510 m	MPC · JPL
852848	2008 UQ_{392}	—	March 20, 2017	Haleakala	Pan-STARRS 1	VER	2.0 km	MPC · JPL
852849	2008 US_{392}	—	October 28, 2008	Mount Lemmon	Mount Lemmon Survey	·	2.6 km	MPC · JPL
852850	2008 UE_{393}	—	October 28, 2008	Mount Lemmon	Mount Lemmon Survey	PHO	650 m	MPC · JPL
852851	2008 UF_{393}	—	June 5, 2018	Haleakala	Pan-STARRS 1	TIR	2.0 km	MPC · JPL
852852	2008 UJ_{393}	—	October 21, 2008	Kitt Peak	Spacewatch	·	450 m	MPC · JPL
852853	2008 UM_{394}	—	October 25, 2014	Haleakala	Pan-STARRS 1	VER	1.9 km	MPC · JPL
852854	2008 UA_{395}	—	October 26, 2008	Mount Lemmon	Mount Lemmon Survey	·	2.7 km	MPC · JPL
852855	2008 UG_{396}	—	October 24, 2008	Kitt Peak	Spacewatch	·	2.4 km	MPC · JPL
852856	2008 UL_{396}	—	September 20, 2011	Mount Lemmon	Mount Lemmon Survey	·	380 m	MPC · JPL
852857	2008 UT_{396}	—	July 14, 2013	Haleakala	Pan-STARRS 1	·	2.2 km	MPC · JPL
852858	2008 UW_{396}	—	September 21, 2012	Mount Lemmon	Mount Lemmon Survey	·	1 km	MPC · JPL
852859	2008 UF_{397}	—	November 21, 2014	Haleakala	Pan-STARRS 1	·	1.8 km	MPC · JPL
852860	2008 UN_{397}	—	May 19, 2018	Haleakala	Pan-STARRS 1	·	2.4 km	MPC · JPL
852861	2008 UR_{397}	—	October 22, 2008	Kitt Peak	Spacewatch	·	420 m	MPC · JPL
852862	2008 UZ_{397}	—	August 8, 2013	Haleakala	Pan-STARRS 1	·	2.1 km	MPC · JPL
852863	2008 UU_{398}	—	April 20, 2017	Haleakala	Pan-STARRS 1	·	2.1 km	MPC · JPL
852864	2008 UF_{401}	—	August 12, 2013	Haleakala	Pan-STARRS 1	·	2.1 km	MPC · JPL
852865	2008 UK_{402}	—	October 19, 2008	Kitt Peak	Spacewatch	EUN	780 m	MPC · JPL
852866	2008 UT_{402}	—	October 31, 2008	Catalina	CSS	(1547)	1.0 km	MPC · JPL
852867	2008 UK_{403}	—	October 23, 2008	Kitt Peak	Spacewatch	·	2.1 km	MPC · JPL
852868	2008 UT_{403}	—	October 23, 2008	Mount Lemmon	Mount Lemmon Survey	·	2.0 km	MPC · JPL
852869	2008 UO_{404}	—	October 20, 2008	Mount Lemmon	Mount Lemmon Survey	·	1.0 km	MPC · JPL
852870	2008 UP_{404}	—	October 20, 2008	Mount Lemmon	Mount Lemmon Survey	MAS	460 m	MPC · JPL
852871	2008 UU_{404}	—	October 27, 2008	Kitt Peak	Spacewatch	·	440 m	MPC · JPL
852872	2008 UW_{404}	—	October 30, 2008	Kitt Peak	Spacewatch	·	1.4 km	MPC · JPL
852873	2008 UX_{404}	—	October 21, 2008	Kitt Peak	Spacewatch	·	1.1 km	MPC · JPL
852874	2008 UA_{405}	—	October 25, 2008	Kitt Peak	Spacewatch	(2076)	620 m	MPC · JPL
852875	2008 UB_{405}	—	October 26, 2008	Kitt Peak	Spacewatch	URS	2.2 km	MPC · JPL
852876	2008 UP_{405}	—	October 31, 2008	Kitt Peak	Spacewatch	·	1.9 km	MPC · JPL
852877	2008 UJ_{406}	—	October 22, 2008	Kitt Peak	Spacewatch	·	1.9 km	MPC · JPL
852878	2008 UX_{406}	—	October 21, 2008	Mount Lemmon	Mount Lemmon Survey	·	1.1 km	MPC · JPL
852879	2008 UW_{408}	—	October 27, 2008	Kitt Peak	Spacewatch	·	2.7 km	MPC · JPL
852880	2008 UA_{409}	—	October 29, 2008	Mount Lemmon	Mount Lemmon Survey	·	1.1 km	MPC · JPL
852881	2008 UH_{409}	—	October 20, 2008	Kitt Peak	Spacewatch	EUP	2.4 km	MPC · JPL
852882	2008 UP_{409}	—	October 29, 2008	Kitt Peak	Spacewatch	(895)	2.8 km	MPC · JPL
852883	2008 UP_{411}	—	October 30, 2008	Mount Lemmon	Mount Lemmon Survey	JUN	860 m	MPC · JPL
852884	2008 UY_{411}	—	October 25, 2008	Mount Lemmon	Mount Lemmon Survey	·	1.2 km	MPC · JPL
852885	2008 UG_{412}	—	August 11, 2018	Haleakala	Pan-STARRS 1	·	520 m	MPC · JPL
852886	2008 UM_{412}	—	October 27, 2008	Kitt Peak	Spacewatch	·	2.0 km	MPC · JPL
852887	2008 UJ_{413}	—	October 20, 2008	Mount Lemmon	Mount Lemmon Survey	EOS	1.2 km	MPC · JPL
852888	2008 UK_{413}	—	October 9, 2008	Mount Lemmon	Mount Lemmon Survey	·	570 m	MPC · JPL
852889	2008 UL_{413}	—	October 31, 2008	Kitt Peak	Spacewatch	·	420 m	MPC · JPL
852890	2008 UN_{413}	—	October 27, 2008	Kitt Peak	Spacewatch	·	590 m	MPC · JPL
852891	2008 UG_{414}	—	October 28, 2008	Mount Lemmon	Mount Lemmon Survey	·	540 m	MPC · JPL
852892	2008 UD_{418}	—	October 24, 2008	Kitt Peak	Spacewatch	EUN	910 m	MPC · JPL
852893	2008 UM_{418}	—	October 26, 2008	Mount Lemmon	Mount Lemmon Survey	H	340 m	MPC · JPL
852894	2008 UO_{418}	—	October 23, 2008	Kitt Peak	Spacewatch	V	460 m	MPC · JPL
852895	2008 UU_{418}	—	October 27, 2008	Kitt Peak	Spacewatch	·	940 m	MPC · JPL
852896	2008 UV_{418}	—	October 29, 2008	Kitt Peak	Spacewatch	HNS	710 m	MPC · JPL
852897	2008 UF_{419}	—	October 28, 2008	Kitt Peak	Spacewatch	·	1.2 km	MPC · JPL
852898	2008 UA_{420}	—	October 30, 2008	Mount Lemmon	Mount Lemmon Survey	·	1.1 km	MPC · JPL
852899	2008 UB_{420}	—	October 29, 2008	Kitt Peak	Spacewatch	·	1.1 km	MPC · JPL
852900	2008 UF_{420}	—	October 25, 2008	Kitt Peak	Spacewatch	·	940 m	MPC · JPL

== 852901–853000 ==
back to top

Designation			Discovery			Properties		Ref
Permanent	Provisional	Named after	Date	Site	Discoverer(s)	Category	Diam.	Ref
852901	2008 UZ_{420}	—	October 24, 2008	Mount Lemmon	Mount Lemmon Survey	·	1.2 km	MPC · JPL
852902	2008 UB_{421}	—	October 25, 2008	Mount Lemmon	Mount Lemmon Survey	PHO	750 m	MPC · JPL
852903	2008 UC_{421}	—	September 20, 2008	Catalina	CSS	T_{j} (2.94)	2.5 km	MPC · JPL
852904	2008 UB_{428}	—	October 21, 2008	Kitt Peak	Spacewatch	·	1.6 km	MPC · JPL
852905	2008 UN_{428}	—	October 29, 2008	Kitt Peak	Spacewatch	·	2.2 km	MPC · JPL
852906	2008 US_{429}	—	October 21, 2008	Kitt Peak	Spacewatch	·	510 m	MPC · JPL
852907	2008 UW_{429}	—	October 21, 2008	Mount Lemmon	Mount Lemmon Survey	·	2.1 km	MPC · JPL
852908	2008 VF_{8}	—	November 2, 2008	Mount Lemmon	Mount Lemmon Survey	·	2.6 km	MPC · JPL
852909	2008 VX_{8}	—	November 2, 2008	Mount Lemmon	Mount Lemmon Survey	EUN	780 m	MPC · JPL
852910	2008 VG_{10}	—	November 2, 2008	Kitt Peak	Spacewatch	·	460 m	MPC · JPL
852911	2008 VF_{15}	—	September 25, 2008	Kitt Peak	Spacewatch	·	2.4 km	MPC · JPL
852912	2008 VL_{16}	—	November 1, 2008	Kitt Peak	Spacewatch	·	1.0 km	MPC · JPL
852913	2008 VV_{23}	—	November 1, 2008	Kitt Peak	Spacewatch	·	920 m	MPC · JPL
852914	2008 VZ_{23}	—	November 1, 2008	Kitt Peak	Spacewatch	·	1.9 km	MPC · JPL
852915	2008 VP_{27}	—	October 25, 2008	Kitt Peak	Spacewatch	·	850 m	MPC · JPL
852916	2008 VN_{28}	—	October 24, 2008	Črni Vrh	Matičič, S.	·	1.0 km	MPC · JPL
852917	2008 VE_{29}	—	April 24, 2006	Kitt Peak	Spacewatch	HNS	800 m	MPC · JPL
852918	2008 VJ_{29}	—	October 21, 2008	Kitt Peak	Spacewatch	TIR	2.4 km	MPC · JPL
852919	2008 VQ_{29}	—	September 25, 2008	Mount Lemmon	Mount Lemmon Survey	·	800 m	MPC · JPL
852920	2008 VN_{36}	—	November 2, 2008	Mount Lemmon	Mount Lemmon Survey	·	1.3 km	MPC · JPL
852921	2008 VM_{38}	—	September 24, 2008	Mount Lemmon	Mount Lemmon Survey	·	2.1 km	MPC · JPL
852922	2008 VM_{39}	—	November 2, 2008	Kitt Peak	Spacewatch	·	620 m	MPC · JPL
852923	2008 VR_{51}	—	September 23, 2008	Kitt Peak	Spacewatch	·	1.4 km	MPC · JPL
852924	2008 VV_{55}	—	November 6, 2008	Mount Lemmon	Mount Lemmon Survey	·	1.2 km	MPC · JPL
852925	2008 VM_{58}	—	September 23, 2008	Kitt Peak	Spacewatch	·	1.2 km	MPC · JPL
852926	2008 VM_{60}	—	November 7, 2008	Mount Lemmon	Mount Lemmon Survey	·	1.1 km	MPC · JPL
852927	2008 VE_{62}	—	October 27, 2008	Kitt Peak	Spacewatch	·	480 m	MPC · JPL
852928	2008 VO_{62}	—	October 23, 2008	Kitt Peak	Spacewatch	·	2.2 km	MPC · JPL
852929	2008 VU_{63}	—	October 10, 2008	Mount Lemmon	Mount Lemmon Survey	·	590 m	MPC · JPL
852930	2008 VJ_{64}	—	November 8, 2008	Kitt Peak	Spacewatch	·	1.1 km	MPC · JPL
852931	2008 VX_{65}	—	November 1, 2008	Mount Lemmon	Mount Lemmon Survey	MAS	590 m	MPC · JPL
852932	2008 VM_{68}	—	November 3, 2008	Mount Lemmon	Mount Lemmon Survey	·	1.5 km	MPC · JPL
852933	2008 VP_{70}	—	November 7, 2008	Mount Lemmon	Mount Lemmon Survey	·	1.7 km	MPC · JPL
852934	2008 VZ_{71}	—	November 1, 2008	Mount Lemmon	Mount Lemmon Survey	THB	1.7 km	MPC · JPL
852935	2008 VV_{72}	—	November 1, 2008	Mount Lemmon	Mount Lemmon Survey	·	960 m	MPC · JPL
852936	2008 VL_{73}	—	November 3, 2008	Kitt Peak	Spacewatch	·	1.1 km	MPC · JPL
852937	2008 VB_{75}	—	November 2, 2008	Catalina	CSS	BAR	1.0 km	MPC · JPL
852938	2008 VQ_{82}	—	November 2, 2008	Catalina	CSS	DOR	2.0 km	MPC · JPL
852939	2008 VL_{84}	—	November 6, 2008	Mount Lemmon	Mount Lemmon Survey	·	1.4 km	MPC · JPL
852940	2008 VB_{86}	—	November 2, 2008	Mount Lemmon	Mount Lemmon Survey	JUN	630 m	MPC · JPL
852941	2008 VG_{86}	—	July 2, 2011	Kitt Peak	Spacewatch	·	450 m	MPC · JPL
852942	2008 VD_{87}	—	November 1, 2008	Kitt Peak	Spacewatch	EUN	850 m	MPC · JPL
852943	2008 VU_{87}	—	October 16, 2012	Mount Lemmon	Mount Lemmon Survey	·	1.1 km	MPC · JPL
852944	2008 VM_{88}	—	November 6, 2008	Kitt Peak	Spacewatch	EUN	960 m	MPC · JPL
852945	2008 VW_{88}	—	November 7, 2008	Mount Lemmon	Mount Lemmon Survey	·	2.1 km	MPC · JPL
852946	2008 VY_{88}	—	November 7, 2008	Mount Lemmon	Mount Lemmon Survey	THM	1.9 km	MPC · JPL
852947	2008 VZ_{88}	—	November 8, 2008	Mount Lemmon	Mount Lemmon Survey	·	890 m	MPC · JPL
852948	2008 VW_{89}	—	November 26, 2014	Haleakala	Pan-STARRS 1	LIX	2.3 km	MPC · JPL
852949	2008 VD_{90}	—	November 3, 2008	Kitt Peak	Spacewatch	·	2.1 km	MPC · JPL
852950	2008 VK_{90}	—	November 9, 2008	Mount Lemmon	Mount Lemmon Survey	·	2.1 km	MPC · JPL
852951	2008 VA_{91}	—	July 25, 2015	Haleakala	Pan-STARRS 1	·	750 m	MPC · JPL
852952	2008 VZ_{91}	—	August 15, 2013	Haleakala	Pan-STARRS 1	·	2.0 km	MPC · JPL
852953	2008 VB_{92}	—	November 8, 2008	Mount Lemmon	Mount Lemmon Survey	·	2.3 km	MPC · JPL
852954	2008 VE_{92}	—	March 13, 2016	Haleakala	Pan-STARRS 1	EOS	1.3 km	MPC · JPL
852955	2008 VG_{92}	—	December 16, 2015	Mount Lemmon	Mount Lemmon Survey	·	490 m	MPC · JPL
852956	2008 VV_{92}	—	November 3, 2008	Kitt Peak	Spacewatch	·	2.2 km	MPC · JPL
852957	2008 VJ_{93}	—	October 26, 2008	Kitt Peak	Spacewatch	·	980 m	MPC · JPL
852958	2008 VT_{93}	—	December 4, 2015	Mount Lemmon	Mount Lemmon Survey	·	530 m	MPC · JPL
852959	2008 VX_{93}	—	July 11, 2016	Haleakala	Pan-STARRS 1	MAR	680 m	MPC · JPL
852960	2008 VA_{94}	—	November 3, 2008	Mount Lemmon	Mount Lemmon Survey	H	310 m	MPC · JPL
852961	2008 VV_{94}	—	November 26, 2014	Mount Lemmon	Mount Lemmon Survey	·	2.2 km	MPC · JPL
852962	2008 VY_{94}	—	November 27, 2014	Haleakala	Pan-STARRS 1	·	2.0 km	MPC · JPL
852963	2008 VN_{95}	—	November 7, 2008	Mount Lemmon	Mount Lemmon Survey	·	1.1 km	MPC · JPL
852964	2008 VJ_{96}	—	December 11, 2014	Mount Lemmon	Mount Lemmon Survey	·	2.2 km	MPC · JPL
852965	2008 VL_{97}	—	February 11, 2016	Haleakala	Pan-STARRS 1	·	2.1 km	MPC · JPL
852966	2008 VU_{97}	—	August 12, 2013	Haleakala	Pan-STARRS 1	·	2.0 km	MPC · JPL
852967	2008 VD_{98}	—	November 7, 2008	Mount Lemmon	Mount Lemmon Survey	·	940 m	MPC · JPL
852968	2008 VL_{98}	—	November 7, 2008	Mount Lemmon	Mount Lemmon Survey	KOR	1.0 km	MPC · JPL
852969	2008 VY_{100}	—	November 9, 2008	Kitt Peak	Spacewatch	·	420 m	MPC · JPL
852970	2008 VD_{101}	—	November 7, 2008	Mount Lemmon	Mount Lemmon Survey	·	1.2 km	MPC · JPL
852971	2008 VF_{101}	—	November 7, 2008	Mount Lemmon	Mount Lemmon Survey	·	1.2 km	MPC · JPL
852972	2008 VL_{101}	—	November 9, 2008	Kitt Peak	Spacewatch	·	1.7 km	MPC · JPL
852973	2008 VX_{101}	—	November 1, 2008	Mount Lemmon	Mount Lemmon Survey	·	1.9 km	MPC · JPL
852974	2008 VB_{102}	—	November 2, 2008	Kitt Peak	Spacewatch	H	330 m	MPC · JPL
852975	2008 VU_{102}	—	November 1, 2008	Kitt Peak	Spacewatch	·	710 m	MPC · JPL
852976	2008 VK_{103}	—	November 2, 2008	Mount Lemmon	Mount Lemmon Survey	·	900 m	MPC · JPL
852977	2008 VQ_{103}	—	November 6, 2008	Mount Lemmon	Mount Lemmon Survey	EOS	1.4 km	MPC · JPL
852978	2008 VT_{103}	—	November 8, 2008	Mount Lemmon	Mount Lemmon Survey	·	1.3 km	MPC · JPL
852979	2008 VW_{104}	—	November 1, 2008	Kitt Peak	Spacewatch	·	2.2 km	MPC · JPL
852980	2008 VJ_{106}	—	November 7, 2008	Mount Lemmon	Mount Lemmon Survey	·	830 m	MPC · JPL
852981	2008 VM_{106}	—	November 8, 2008	Kitt Peak	Spacewatch	·	1.2 km	MPC · JPL
852982	2008 VX_{106}	—	November 1, 2008	Mount Lemmon	Mount Lemmon Survey	·	1.1 km	MPC · JPL
852983	2008 VG_{108}	—	November 8, 2008	Mount Lemmon	Mount Lemmon Survey	·	1.1 km	MPC · JPL
852984	2008 VN_{111}	—	November 3, 2008	Kitt Peak	Spacewatch	·	880 m	MPC · JPL
852985	2008 WL_{1}	—	November 17, 2008	Kitt Peak	Spacewatch	·	320 m	MPC · JPL
852986	2008 WU_{5}	—	October 8, 2008	Kitt Peak	Spacewatch	·	2.1 km	MPC · JPL
852987	2008 WC_{6}	—	November 17, 2008	Kitt Peak	Spacewatch	·	2.5 km	MPC · JPL
852988	2008 WR_{6}	—	October 9, 2008	Kitt Peak	Spacewatch	·	440 m	MPC · JPL
852989	2008 WV_{6}	—	October 2, 2008	Kitt Peak	Spacewatch	·	540 m	MPC · JPL
852990	2008 WV_{7}	—	October 20, 2008	Kitt Peak	Spacewatch	·	880 m	MPC · JPL
852991	2008 WF_{16}	—	October 22, 2008	Kitt Peak	Spacewatch	·	2.2 km	MPC · JPL
852992	2008 WN_{19}	—	October 31, 2008	Kitt Peak	Spacewatch	·	1.3 km	MPC · JPL
852993	2008 WW_{20}	—	October 28, 2008	Kitt Peak	Spacewatch	·	740 m	MPC · JPL
852994	2008 WC_{21}	—	November 17, 2008	Kitt Peak	Spacewatch	·	2.3 km	MPC · JPL
852995	2008 WU_{21}	—	October 9, 2008	Kitt Peak	Spacewatch	THM	1.5 km	MPC · JPL
852996	2008 WQ_{22}	—	November 18, 2008	Kitt Peak	Spacewatch	·	850 m	MPC · JPL
852997	2008 WW_{26}	—	November 19, 2008	Mount Lemmon	Mount Lemmon Survey	·	1.6 km	MPC · JPL
852998	2008 WZ_{33}	—	October 9, 2008	Kitt Peak	Spacewatch	·	920 m	MPC · JPL
852999	2008 WS_{36}	—	November 7, 2008	Kitt Peak	Spacewatch	·	1.6 km	MPC · JPL
853000	2008 WW_{38}	—	November 3, 2008	Kitt Peak	Spacewatch	·	1.8 km	MPC · JPL

back to top
