= Remote Astronomical Society Observatory of New Mexico =

Remote Astronomical Society Observatory, Mayhill
- Observatory code: H06
- Location: Mayhill, New Mexico, USA
- Coordinates: 32.9039°N 105.5289°W
- Altitude: 2,225 m (7,300 ft)
- Website: New Mexico Skies Observatory

Minor planets discovered: 43
see § List of discovered minor planets

The Remote Astronomical Society (RAS) Observatory, Mayhill, also known as the New Mexico Skies Observatory (obs. code H06) is a remotely controlled observatory hosted by the New Mexico Skies astronomy hosting company.

It is located 15 miles north-east of the Apache Point Observatory.

== List of discovered minor planets ==
(183876) 2004 CU_{50}	15 February 2004	list
(191904) 2005 CU_{37}	4 February 2005	list
(212427) 2006 OL	17 July 2006	list
(229895) 2009 VK_{1}	9 November 2009	list
(229896) 2009 VE_{3}	10 November 2009	list
(231660) 2009 XK_{2}	11 December 2009	list
(233966) 2010 BS_{2}	16 January 2010	list
(237336) 2009 WC_{25}	21 November 2009	list
(237349) 2010 CM_{12}	12 February 2010	list
(239761) 2010 CU_{18}	13 February 2010	list
(239762) 2010 CV_{18}	13 February 2010	list
(241555) 2010 GT_{5}	3 April 2010	list
(243490) 2009 UF_{19}	23 October 2009	list
(255588) 2006 OJ_{5}	18 July 2006	list
(261709) 2006 AZ_{3}	6 January 2006	list
(269487) 2009 UW_{17}	20 October 2009	list
(269528) 2009 VN_{44}	15 November 2009	list
(272670) 2005 XD	1 December 2005	list
(275104) 2009 VF_{42}	11 November 2009	list
(275240) 2009 XH_{2}	11 December 2009	list
(279240) 2009 VV	8 November 2009	list
(279317) 2009 XH_{1}	10 December 2009	list
(280968) 2006 DJ_{1}	20 February 2006	list
(296901) 2010 CL_{12}	12 February 2010	list
(297060) 2010 JF_{1}	4 May 2010	list

(306105) 2010 JU_{14}	5 May 2010	list
(311499) 2005 WM_{57}	30 November 2005	list
(328790) 2009 VJ_{1}	9 November 2009	list
(330083) 2005 WL_{57}	30 November 2005	list
(331055) 2009 WJ	16 November 2009	list
(336654) 2009 XX_{2}	12 December 2009	list
(372601) 2009 VH_{1}	9 November 2009	list
(372603) 2009 VD_{3}	10 November 2009	list
(372712) 2009 XG_{2}	11 December 2009	list
(372744) 2010 AQ_{61}	15 January 2010	list
(379294) 2009 VO_{44}	15 November 2009	list
(381903) 2010 CC_{12}	6 February 2010	list
(384353) 2009 UV_{17}	20 October 2009	list
(384375) 2009 VC_{3}	10 November 2009	list
(389396) 2009 XZ_{7}	15 December 2009	list
(419365) 2009 XF_{1}	10 December 2009	list
(423637) 2005 XP	1 December 2005	list
(482041) 2009 WT_{105}	25 November 2009	list

== See also ==
- List of minor planet discoverers § Discovering dedicated institutions
- List of observatories
