= Meanings of minor-planet names: 372001–373000 =

As minor planet discoveries are confirmed, they are given a permanent number by the IAU's Minor Planet Center (MPC), and the discoverers can then submit names for them, following the IAU's naming conventions. The list below concerns those minor planets in the specified number-range that have received names, and explains the meanings of those names.

Official naming citations of newly named small Solar System bodies are approved and published in a bulletin by IAU's Working Group for Small Bodies Nomenclature (WGSBN). Before May 2021, citations were published in MPC's Minor Planet Circulars for many decades. Recent citations can also be found on the JPL Small-Body Database (SBDB). Until his death in 2016, German astronomer Lutz D. Schmadel compiled these citations into the Dictionary of Minor Planet Names (DMP) and regularly updated the collection.

Based on Paul Herget's The Names of the Minor Planets, Schmadel also researched the unclear origin of numerous asteroids, most of which had been named prior to World War II. This article incorporates text from this source, which is in the public domain: SBDB New namings may only be added to this list below after official publication as the preannouncement of names is condemned. The WGSBN publishes a comprehensive guideline for the naming rules of non-cometary small Solar System bodies.

== 372001–372100 ==
Named minor planet	Provisional	This minor planet was named for...	Ref · Catalog
372024 Ayapani	2008 QA_{3}	Ayapani is the local name for the beautiful feathers of the crested serpent eagles, when they are adults and fly away at New Year.	JPL · 372024

== 372101–372200 ==
back to top

Named minor planet	Provisional	This minor planet was named for...	Ref · Catalog
There are no named minor planets in this number range

== 372201–372300 ==
back to top

Named minor planet	Provisional	This minor planet was named for...	Ref · Catalog
There are no named minor planets in this number range

== 372301–372400 ==
back to top

Named minor planet	Provisional	This minor planet was named for...	Ref · Catalog
372305 Bourdeille	2008 WO_{61}	Christian Bourdeille (born 1958) is the founding president of Uranoscope de l´Ile de France, an astronomical observatory open to the public since 1983 in Gretz Armainvilliers (France). He is also the founding president of Uranoscope de France created in 1995 with the fundamental goal of developing international relations between amateur and professional astronomers worldwide.	JPL · 372305

== 372401–372500 ==
back to top

Named minor planet	Provisional	This minor planet was named for...	Ref · Catalog
There are no named minor planets in this number range

== 372501–372600 ==
back to top

Named minor planet	Provisional	This minor planet was named for...	Ref · Catalog
372573 Pietromenga	2009 UW_{59}	Pietro Menga (born 1943), active on a voluntary basis in environmental policies, has contributed to Italian initiatives on sustainable energy use and on the protection of the night sky.	JPL · 372573
372578 Khromov	2009 UB_{92}	Gavriil Sergeevich Khromov (1937–2014), a Russian astronomer and organizer of science.	JPL · 372578

== 372601–372700 ==
back to top

Named minor planet	Provisional	This minor planet was named for...	Ref · Catalog
372626 IGEM	2009 VQ_{57}	IGEM, the Institute of Ore Geology, Petrography, Mineralogy and Geochemistry within the Russian Academy of Sciences (RAS)	JPL · 372626

== 372701–372800 ==
back to top

Named minor planet	Provisional	This minor planet was named for...	Ref · Catalog
There are no named minor planets in this number range

== 372801–372900 ==
back to top

Named minor planet	Provisional	This minor planet was named for...	Ref · Catalog
There are no named minor planets in this number range

== 372901–373000 ==
back to top

Named minor planet	Provisional	This minor planet was named for...	Ref · Catalog
There are no named minor planets in this number range

back to top

Preceded by 371,001–372,000	Meanings of minor-planet names List of minor planets: 372,001–373,000	Succeeded by 373,001–374,000
