= List of minor planets: 372001–373000 =

The following is a partial list of minor planets, running from minor-planet number 372001 through 373000, inclusive. The primary data for this and other partial lists is based on JPL's "Small-Body Orbital Elements" and data available from the Minor Planet Center. Critical list information is also provided by the MPC, unless otherwise specified from Lowell Observatory. A detailed description of the table's columns and additional sources are given on the main page including a complete list of every page in this series, and a statistical break-up on the dynamical classification of minor planets.

Also see the summary list of all named bodies in numerical and alphabetical order, and the corresponding naming citations for the number range of this particular list. New namings may only be added to this list after official publication, as the preannouncement of names is condemned by the Working Group for Small Bodies Nomenclature of the International Astronomical Union.

Near-Earth obj.	MBA (inner)	MBA (outer)	Centaur
Mars-crosser	MBA (middle)	Jupiter trojan	Trans-Neptunian obj.
Unclassified

== 372001–372100 ==
Designation			Discovery			Properties		Ref
Permanent	Provisional	Named after	Date	Site	Discoverer(s)	Category	Diam.	Ref
372001	2008 HL_{27}	—	April 27, 2008	Kitt Peak	Spacewatch	·	2.0 km	MPC · JPL
372002	2008 HN_{28}	—	February 12, 2008	Mount Lemmon	Mount Lemmon Survey	·	1.3 km	MPC · JPL
372003	2008 HW_{44}	—	March 28, 2008	Mount Lemmon	Mount Lemmon Survey	·	950 m	MPC · JPL
372004	2008 HP_{47}	—	March 5, 2008	Mount Lemmon	Mount Lemmon Survey	JUN	980 m	MPC · JPL
372005	2008 JF_{5}	—	January 30, 2008	Mount Lemmon	Mount Lemmon Survey	·	1.3 km	MPC · JPL
372006	2008 JV_{8}	—	March 5, 2008	Mount Lemmon	Mount Lemmon Survey	·	1.3 km	MPC · JPL
372007	2008 JW_{30}	—	January 10, 2007	Mount Lemmon	Mount Lemmon Survey	·	1.1 km	MPC · JPL
372008	2008 JM_{31}	—	April 16, 2008	Mount Lemmon	Mount Lemmon Survey	·	1.7 km	MPC · JPL
372009	2008 JJ_{34}	—	May 14, 2008	Kitt Peak	Spacewatch	·	2.0 km	MPC · JPL
372010	2008 JE_{38}	—	May 5, 2008	Kitt Peak	Spacewatch	·	2.0 km	MPC · JPL
372011	2008 KJ_{12}	—	May 26, 2008	Kitt Peak	Spacewatch	HNS	1.4 km	MPC · JPL
372012	2008 KN_{24}	—	May 28, 2008	Kitt Peak	Spacewatch	EUN	1.4 km	MPC · JPL
372013	2008 KQ_{37}	—	April 30, 2008	Mount Lemmon	Mount Lemmon Survey	·	1.3 km	MPC · JPL
372014	2008 LA_{7}	—	June 3, 2008	Kitt Peak	Spacewatch	·	1.5 km	MPC · JPL
372015	2008 LX_{7}	—	June 4, 2008	Kitt Peak	Spacewatch	EUN	940 m	MPC · JPL
372016	2008 LD_{13}	—	May 28, 2008	Mount Lemmon	Mount Lemmon Survey	·	1.8 km	MPC · JPL
372017	2008 LB_{16}	—	June 10, 2008	Kitt Peak	Spacewatch	ADE	2.4 km	MPC · JPL
372018	2008 LU_{17}	—	June 2, 2008	Mount Lemmon	Mount Lemmon Survey	·	6.3 km	MPC · JPL
372019	2008 NS_{4}	—	July 12, 2008	La Sagra	OAM	AEO	1.1 km	MPC · JPL
372020	2008 OC_{12}	—	July 25, 2008	La Sagra	OAM	·	2.9 km	MPC · JPL
372021	2008 OQ_{13}	—	July 26, 2008	Siding Spring	SSS	·	2.7 km	MPC · JPL
372022	2008 PK_{20}	—	August 7, 2008	Kitt Peak	Spacewatch	KOR	1.5 km	MPC · JPL
372023	2008 PU_{20}	—	August 6, 2008	Siding Spring	SSS	·	3.4 km	MPC · JPL
372024 Ayapani	2008 QA_{3}	Ayapani	August 24, 2008	Ishigakijima	Ishigakijima	·	2.2 km	MPC · JPL
372025	2008 QX_{8}	—	August 25, 2008	La Sagra	OAM	·	3.0 km	MPC · JPL
372026	2008 QV_{28}	—	August 20, 2008	Tiki	Teamo, N.	·	2.6 km	MPC · JPL
372027	2008 QU_{37}	—	August 21, 2008	Kitt Peak	Spacewatch	·	1.5 km	MPC · JPL
372028	2008 QC_{42}	—	August 21, 2008	Kitt Peak	Spacewatch	KOR	1.3 km	MPC · JPL
372029	2008 QB_{45}	—	August 24, 2008	Kitt Peak	Spacewatch	EOS	2.4 km	MPC · JPL
372030	2008 RT_{9}	—	September 3, 2008	Kitt Peak	Spacewatch	EOS	1.7 km	MPC · JPL
372031	2008 RV_{17}	—	September 4, 2008	Kitt Peak	Spacewatch	·	1.8 km	MPC · JPL
372032	2008 RW_{17}	—	August 24, 2008	Kitt Peak	Spacewatch	·	2.3 km	MPC · JPL
372033	2008 RJ_{18}	—	September 4, 2008	Kitt Peak	Spacewatch	·	2.7 km	MPC · JPL
372034	2008 RR_{22}	—	September 5, 2008	Pla D'Arguines	R. Ferrando	·	2.3 km	MPC · JPL
372035	2008 RP_{30}	—	September 2, 2008	Kitt Peak	Spacewatch	·	2.8 km	MPC · JPL
372036	2008 RS_{38}	—	September 2, 2008	Kitt Peak	Spacewatch	·	1.8 km	MPC · JPL
372037	2008 RC_{39}	—	September 2, 2008	Kitt Peak	Spacewatch	·	2.4 km	MPC · JPL
372038	2008 RC_{40}	—	September 2, 2008	Kitt Peak	Spacewatch	·	2.1 km	MPC · JPL
372039	2008 RZ_{40}	—	September 2, 2008	Kitt Peak	Spacewatch	KOR	1.9 km	MPC · JPL
372040	2008 RF_{43}	—	September 2, 2008	Kitt Peak	Spacewatch	·	2.9 km	MPC · JPL
372041	2008 RD_{65}	—	September 4, 2008	Kitt Peak	Spacewatch	EOS	1.9 km	MPC · JPL
372042	2008 RD_{68}	—	September 4, 2008	Kitt Peak	Spacewatch	·	2.1 km	MPC · JPL
372043	2008 RM_{74}	—	September 6, 2008	Catalina	CSS	·	2.5 km	MPC · JPL
372044	2008 RS_{77}	—	September 7, 2008	Mount Lemmon	Mount Lemmon Survey	·	2.1 km	MPC · JPL
372045	2008 RN_{80}	—	September 3, 2008	Kitt Peak	Spacewatch	·	2.6 km	MPC · JPL
372046	2008 RY_{88}	—	September 5, 2008	Kitt Peak	Spacewatch	·	2.0 km	MPC · JPL
372047	2008 RR_{89}	—	September 5, 2008	Kitt Peak	Spacewatch	·	3.4 km	MPC · JPL
372048	2008 RF_{90}	—	September 5, 2008	Kitt Peak	Spacewatch	·	2.1 km	MPC · JPL
372049	2008 RO_{92}	—	September 6, 2008	Kitt Peak	Spacewatch	·	2.0 km	MPC · JPL
372050	2008 RN_{96}	—	September 7, 2008	Mount Lemmon	Mount Lemmon Survey	·	2.5 km	MPC · JPL
372051	2008 RS_{96}	—	September 7, 2008	Mount Lemmon	Mount Lemmon Survey	EOS	2.7 km	MPC · JPL
372052	2008 RC_{97}	—	September 7, 2008	Mount Lemmon	Mount Lemmon Survey	·	2.1 km	MPC · JPL
372053	2008 RX_{100}	—	September 5, 2008	Kitt Peak	Spacewatch	·	2.6 km	MPC · JPL
372054	2008 RB_{106}	—	September 6, 2008	Mount Lemmon	Mount Lemmon Survey	·	6.2 km	MPC · JPL
372055	2008 RP_{106}	—	September 7, 2008	Mount Lemmon	Mount Lemmon Survey	·	1.9 km	MPC · JPL
372056	2008 RU_{107}	—	September 9, 2008	Mount Lemmon	Mount Lemmon Survey	AGN	1.3 km	MPC · JPL
372057	2008 RA_{109}	—	September 2, 2008	Kitt Peak	Spacewatch	·	1.7 km	MPC · JPL
372058	2008 RJ_{110}	—	September 3, 2008	Kitt Peak	Spacewatch	·	2.2 km	MPC · JPL
372059	2008 RR_{110}	—	September 3, 2008	Kitt Peak	Spacewatch	·	2.7 km	MPC · JPL
372060	2008 RG_{111}	—	September 4, 2008	Kitt Peak	Spacewatch	·	3.1 km	MPC · JPL
372061	2008 RZ_{114}	—	September 6, 2008	Mount Lemmon	Mount Lemmon Survey	THM	2.1 km	MPC · JPL
372062	2008 RJ_{123}	—	September 6, 2008	Kitt Peak	Spacewatch	KOR	1.5 km	MPC · JPL
372063	2008 RQ_{123}	—	September 6, 2008	Kitt Peak	Spacewatch	EOS	2.0 km	MPC · JPL
372064	2008 RK_{129}	—	September 7, 2008	Mount Lemmon	Mount Lemmon Survey	·	3.3 km	MPC · JPL
372065	2008 RS_{129}	—	September 7, 2008	Mount Lemmon	Mount Lemmon Survey	·	2.3 km	MPC · JPL
372066	2008 RR_{131}	—	September 5, 2008	Kitt Peak	Spacewatch	·	1.7 km	MPC · JPL
372067	2008 RH_{136}	—	September 4, 2008	Socorro	LINEAR	EOS	2.5 km	MPC · JPL
372068	2008 RJ_{141}	—	August 7, 2008	Kitt Peak	Spacewatch	·	2.3 km	MPC · JPL
372069	2008 RX_{142}	—	September 2, 2008	Kitt Peak	Spacewatch	EOS	1.7 km	MPC · JPL
372070	2008 SM	—	September 20, 2008	Kitt Peak	Spacewatch	H	600 m	MPC · JPL
372071	2008 SP_{1}	—	September 23, 2008	Catalina	CSS	H	570 m	MPC · JPL
372072	2008 SH_{11}	—	September 22, 2008	Calvin-Rehoboth	Calvin College	·	2.4 km	MPC · JPL
372073	2008 SZ_{11}	—	September 23, 2008	Catalina	CSS	·	2.7 km	MPC · JPL
372074	2008 SL_{26}	—	September 19, 2008	Kitt Peak	Spacewatch	KOR	1.7 km	MPC · JPL
372075	2008 SW_{27}	—	September 19, 2008	Kitt Peak	Spacewatch	KOR	1.6 km	MPC · JPL
372076	2008 SE_{28}	—	September 19, 2008	Kitt Peak	Spacewatch	H	410 m	MPC · JPL
372077	2008 SW_{32}	—	September 20, 2008	Kitt Peak	Spacewatch	·	5.3 km	MPC · JPL
372078	2008 SC_{33}	—	September 20, 2008	Mount Lemmon	Mount Lemmon Survey	·	1.7 km	MPC · JPL
372079	2008 SP_{34}	—	September 20, 2008	Kitt Peak	Spacewatch	·	3.7 km	MPC · JPL
372080	2008 SD_{36}	—	September 20, 2008	Kitt Peak	Spacewatch	·	3.7 km	MPC · JPL
372081	2008 SF_{40}	—	September 20, 2008	Kitt Peak	Spacewatch	AGN	1.3 km	MPC · JPL
372082	2008 SK_{40}	—	September 20, 2008	Kitt Peak	Spacewatch	KOR	1.5 km	MPC · JPL
372083	2008 SO_{50}	—	August 24, 2008	Kitt Peak	Spacewatch	EOS	2.0 km	MPC · JPL
372084	2008 SQ_{52}	—	September 20, 2008	Mount Lemmon	Mount Lemmon Survey	·	2.6 km	MPC · JPL
372085	2008 SR_{52}	—	September 20, 2008	Mount Lemmon	Mount Lemmon Survey	·	2.1 km	MPC · JPL
372086	2008 SS_{53}	—	March 2, 2006	Kitt Peak	Spacewatch	·	2.3 km	MPC · JPL
372087	2008 SY_{53}	—	September 20, 2008	Mount Lemmon	Mount Lemmon Survey	·	2.2 km	MPC · JPL
372088	2008 SJ_{57}	—	September 20, 2008	Mount Lemmon	Mount Lemmon Survey	·	4.0 km	MPC · JPL
372089	2008 SU_{65}	—	September 21, 2008	Mount Lemmon	Mount Lemmon Survey	·	3.3 km	MPC · JPL
372090	2008 SV_{65}	—	September 21, 2008	Mount Lemmon	Mount Lemmon Survey	·	4.7 km	MPC · JPL
372091	2008 SP_{75}	—	September 23, 2008	Mount Lemmon	Mount Lemmon Survey	·	2.0 km	MPC · JPL
372092	2008 SZ_{89}	—	September 21, 2008	Kitt Peak	Spacewatch	EOS	2.6 km	MPC · JPL
372093	2008 SB_{90}	—	September 21, 2008	Kitt Peak	Spacewatch	·	3.1 km	MPC · JPL
372094	2008 SV_{93}	—	September 21, 2008	Kitt Peak	Spacewatch	·	2.6 km	MPC · JPL
372095	2008 SC_{94}	—	September 21, 2008	Kitt Peak	Spacewatch	HYG	2.8 km	MPC · JPL
372096	2008 SC_{97}	—	September 21, 2008	Kitt Peak	Spacewatch	·	4.1 km	MPC · JPL
372097	2008 SL_{97}	—	September 21, 2008	Kitt Peak	Spacewatch	EOS	2.0 km	MPC · JPL
372098	2008 SV_{100}	—	September 21, 2008	Kitt Peak	Spacewatch	·	4.8 km	MPC · JPL
372099	2008 ST_{102}	—	September 21, 2008	Mount Lemmon	Mount Lemmon Survey	·	3.0 km	MPC · JPL
372100	2008 SL_{104}	—	September 21, 2008	Kitt Peak	Spacewatch	VER	2.7 km	MPC · JPL

== 372101–372200 ==
back to top

Designation			Discovery			Properties		Ref
Permanent	Provisional	Named after	Date	Site	Discoverer(s)	Category	Diam.	Ref
372101	2008 SA_{105}	—	September 21, 2008	Kitt Peak	Spacewatch	HYG	2.6 km	MPC · JPL
372102	2008 SR_{119}	—	September 22, 2008	Mount Lemmon	Mount Lemmon Survey	KOR	1.4 km	MPC · JPL
372103	2008 SK_{120}	—	September 22, 2008	Mount Lemmon	Mount Lemmon Survey	KOR	1.5 km	MPC · JPL
372104	2008 SZ_{122}	—	September 22, 2008	Mount Lemmon	Mount Lemmon Survey	·	2.4 km	MPC · JPL
372105	2008 SK_{128}	—	September 22, 2008	Kitt Peak	Spacewatch	·	4.3 km	MPC · JPL
372106	2008 ST_{128}	—	September 22, 2008	Kitt Peak	Spacewatch	·	2.7 km	MPC · JPL
372107	2008 SJ_{129}	—	September 22, 2008	Kitt Peak	Spacewatch	·	2.1 km	MPC · JPL
372108	2008 SK_{129}	—	September 22, 2008	Kitt Peak	Spacewatch	·	2.6 km	MPC · JPL
372109	2008 SX_{129}	—	September 22, 2008	Kitt Peak	Spacewatch	·	2.9 km	MPC · JPL
372110	2008 SG_{131}	—	September 22, 2008	Kitt Peak	Spacewatch	·	2.7 km	MPC · JPL
372111	2008 SR_{132}	—	September 22, 2008	Kitt Peak	Spacewatch	H	570 m	MPC · JPL
372112	2008 SU_{132}	—	September 22, 2008	Kitt Peak	Spacewatch	·	1.4 km	MPC · JPL
372113	2008 SM_{134}	—	September 23, 2008	Kitt Peak	Spacewatch	(31811)	3.1 km	MPC · JPL
372114	2008 SP_{136}	—	September 23, 2008	Kitt Peak	Spacewatch	·	2.5 km	MPC · JPL
372115	2008 SF_{142}	—	September 24, 2008	Mount Lemmon	Mount Lemmon Survey	THM	2.0 km	MPC · JPL
372116	2008 SM_{145}	—	September 20, 2008	Kitt Peak	Spacewatch	·	2.8 km	MPC · JPL
372117	2008 SV_{146}	—	September 23, 2008	Catalina	CSS	·	3.5 km	MPC · JPL
372118	2008 SE_{161}	—	August 24, 2008	Kitt Peak	Spacewatch	·	2.0 km	MPC · JPL
372119	2008 SB_{162}	—	September 28, 2008	Socorro	LINEAR	·	5.9 km	MPC · JPL
372120	2008 SY_{164}	—	September 28, 2008	Socorro	LINEAR	·	3.6 km	MPC · JPL
372121	2008 SM_{167}	—	September 28, 2008	Socorro	LINEAR	·	2.8 km	MPC · JPL
372122	2008 SV_{169}	—	September 21, 2008	Mount Lemmon	Mount Lemmon Survey	·	1.6 km	MPC · JPL
372123	2008 SZ_{179}	—	September 24, 2008	Kitt Peak	Spacewatch	·	2.5 km	MPC · JPL
372124	2008 SJ_{180}	—	September 24, 2008	Kitt Peak	Spacewatch	·	3.6 km	MPC · JPL
372125	2008 SF_{182}	—	September 24, 2008	Mount Lemmon	Mount Lemmon Survey	VER	2.7 km	MPC · JPL
372126	2008 SA_{193}	—	September 25, 2008	Kitt Peak	Spacewatch	TIR	3.5 km	MPC · JPL
372127	2008 SY_{196}	—	September 25, 2008	Kitt Peak	Spacewatch	·	2.9 km	MPC · JPL
372128	2008 SA_{198}	—	September 25, 2008	Kitt Peak	Spacewatch	·	4.3 km	MPC · JPL
372129	2008 SC_{198}	—	September 25, 2008	Kitt Peak	Spacewatch	·	2.2 km	MPC · JPL
372130	2008 ST_{206}	—	September 26, 2008	Kitt Peak	Spacewatch	EOS	2.6 km	MPC · JPL
372131	2008 SC_{220}	—	September 30, 2008	La Sagra	OAM	·	2.2 km	MPC · JPL
372132	2008 SE_{226}	—	September 26, 2008	Kitt Peak	Spacewatch	·	2.6 km	MPC · JPL
372133	2008 SE_{236}	—	September 29, 2008	Kitt Peak	Spacewatch	H	510 m	MPC · JPL
372134	2008 SN_{237}	—	September 29, 2008	Mount Lemmon	Mount Lemmon Survey	·	1.9 km	MPC · JPL
372135	2008 SF_{240}	—	September 29, 2008	Kitt Peak	Spacewatch	·	3.2 km	MPC · JPL
372136	2008 SP_{241}	—	September 4, 2008	Kitt Peak	Spacewatch	·	2.9 km	MPC · JPL
372137	2008 SH_{243}	—	September 29, 2008	Kitt Peak	Spacewatch	·	3.4 km	MPC · JPL
372138	2008 SG_{244}	—	September 24, 2008	Kitt Peak	Spacewatch	THM	2.8 km	MPC · JPL
372139	2008 SQ_{248}	—	September 21, 2008	Kitt Peak	Spacewatch	·	2.2 km	MPC · JPL
372140	2008 SW_{249}	—	September 23, 2008	Kitt Peak	Spacewatch	·	2.3 km	MPC · JPL
372141	2008 SA_{253}	—	September 21, 2008	Kitt Peak	Spacewatch	EOS	2.0 km	MPC · JPL
372142	2008 SV_{256}	—	September 21, 2008	Catalina	CSS	·	2.7 km	MPC · JPL
372143	2008 SP_{261}	—	September 23, 2008	Kitt Peak	Spacewatch	·	3.7 km	MPC · JPL
372144	2008 SH_{265}	—	September 27, 2008	Mount Lemmon	Mount Lemmon Survey	·	3.4 km	MPC · JPL
372145	2008 SR_{265}	—	September 29, 2008	Catalina	CSS	·	3.9 km	MPC · JPL
372146	2008 SH_{267}	—	September 23, 2008	Catalina	CSS	·	3.6 km	MPC · JPL
372147	2008 SQ_{267}	—	September 23, 2008	Kitt Peak	Spacewatch	VER	4.3 km	MPC · JPL
372148	2008 SQ_{271}	—	September 29, 2008	Mount Lemmon	Mount Lemmon Survey	·	4.1 km	MPC · JPL
372149	2008 SU_{273}	—	September 19, 2008	Kitt Peak	Spacewatch	·	1.8 km	MPC · JPL
372150	2008 SJ_{279}	—	September 19, 2008	Kitt Peak	Spacewatch	·	2.1 km	MPC · JPL
372151	2008 SQ_{282}	—	September 23, 2008	Kitt Peak	Spacewatch	·	3.7 km	MPC · JPL
372152	2008 SV_{284}	—	September 24, 2008	Kitt Peak	Spacewatch	·	3.7 km	MPC · JPL
372153	2008 SD_{289}	—	September 25, 2008	Kitt Peak	Spacewatch	·	2.7 km	MPC · JPL
372154	2008 SG_{293}	—	September 30, 2008	Catalina	CSS	H	560 m	MPC · JPL
372155	2008 SM_{293}	—	September 24, 2008	Mount Lemmon	Mount Lemmon Survey	·	3.3 km	MPC · JPL
372156	2008 SK_{297}	—	September 30, 2008	Catalina	CSS	·	5.2 km	MPC · JPL
372157	2008 SC_{308}	—	September 29, 2008	Mount Lemmon	Mount Lemmon Survey	·	3.8 km	MPC · JPL
372158	2008 SL_{309}	—	September 27, 2008	Mount Lemmon	Mount Lemmon Survey	THM	2.7 km	MPC · JPL
372159	2008 SF_{310}	—	September 29, 2008	Mount Lemmon	Mount Lemmon Survey	EOS	2.2 km	MPC · JPL
372160	2008 TP_{1}	—	September 4, 2008	Kitt Peak	Spacewatch	·	2.6 km	MPC · JPL
372161	2008 TB_{3}	—	October 3, 2008	Sandlot	G. Hug	·	3.6 km	MPC · JPL
372162	2008 TZ_{5}	—	October 3, 2008	La Sagra	OAM	·	2.2 km	MPC · JPL
372163	2008 TT_{8}	—	October 6, 2008	Junk Bond	D. Healy	·	2.9 km	MPC · JPL
372164	2008 TV_{13}	—	October 1, 2008	Mount Lemmon	Mount Lemmon Survey	·	4.0 km	MPC · JPL
372165	2008 TZ_{13}	—	October 1, 2008	Mount Lemmon	Mount Lemmon Survey	·	2.6 km	MPC · JPL
372166	2008 TG_{16}	—	October 1, 2008	Mount Lemmon	Mount Lemmon Survey	·	2.0 km	MPC · JPL
372167	2008 TF_{24}	—	October 2, 2008	Catalina	CSS	EOS	2.2 km	MPC · JPL
372168	2008 TO_{34}	—	October 1, 2008	Kitt Peak	Spacewatch	·	3.4 km	MPC · JPL
372169	2008 TL_{38}	—	October 1, 2008	Catalina	CSS	·	3.0 km	MPC · JPL
372170	2008 TL_{42}	—	October 1, 2008	Mount Lemmon	Mount Lemmon Survey	·	4.1 km	MPC · JPL
372171	2008 TE_{46}	—	October 1, 2008	Kitt Peak	Spacewatch	·	2.8 km	MPC · JPL
372172	2008 TH_{51}	—	October 2, 2008	Kitt Peak	Spacewatch	·	2.0 km	MPC · JPL
372173	2008 TN_{53}	—	February 6, 2006	Kitt Peak	Spacewatch	·	3.4 km	MPC · JPL
372174	2008 TB_{55}	—	October 2, 2008	Kitt Peak	Spacewatch	HYG	3.2 km	MPC · JPL
372175	2008 TX_{55}	—	September 9, 2008	Mount Lemmon	Mount Lemmon Survey	HYG	2.3 km	MPC · JPL
372176	2008 TW_{57}	—	October 2, 2008	Kitt Peak	Spacewatch	THM	1.9 km	MPC · JPL
372177	2008 TB_{63}	—	October 2, 2008	Kitt Peak	Spacewatch	·	2.0 km	MPC · JPL
372178	2008 TD_{63}	—	October 2, 2008	Catalina	CSS	EOS	2.9 km	MPC · JPL
372179	2008 TZ_{63}	—	October 2, 2008	Kitt Peak	Spacewatch	THM	2.2 km	MPC · JPL
372180	2008 TP_{66}	—	October 2, 2008	Kitt Peak	Spacewatch	·	3.3 km	MPC · JPL
372181	2008 TW_{73}	—	October 2, 2008	Kitt Peak	Spacewatch	·	3.4 km	MPC · JPL
372182	2008 TS_{77}	—	October 2, 2008	Mount Lemmon	Mount Lemmon Survey	·	4.4 km	MPC · JPL
372183	2008 TA_{80}	—	October 2, 2008	Mount Lemmon	Mount Lemmon Survey	·	1.6 km	MPC · JPL
372184	2008 TB_{84}	—	October 3, 2008	Kitt Peak	Spacewatch	·	3.9 km	MPC · JPL
372185	2008 TB_{85}	—	October 3, 2008	Mount Lemmon	Mount Lemmon Survey	KOR	1.7 km	MPC · JPL
372186	2008 TV_{85}	—	October 3, 2008	Mount Lemmon	Mount Lemmon Survey	·	2.7 km	MPC · JPL
372187	2008 TY_{85}	—	October 3, 2008	Mount Lemmon	Mount Lemmon Survey	·	1.7 km	MPC · JPL
372188	2008 TR_{89}	—	October 3, 2008	Kitt Peak	Spacewatch	·	3.3 km	MPC · JPL
372189	2008 TS_{89}	—	October 3, 2008	Kitt Peak	Spacewatch	·	3.7 km	MPC · JPL
372190	2008 TT_{98}	—	October 6, 2008	Kitt Peak	Spacewatch	·	2.6 km	MPC · JPL
372191	2008 TC_{99}	—	October 6, 2008	Kitt Peak	Spacewatch	·	3.5 km	MPC · JPL
372192	2008 TX_{105}	—	October 6, 2008	Kitt Peak	Spacewatch	EOS	2.1 km	MPC · JPL
372193	2008 TU_{106}	—	October 6, 2008	Mount Lemmon	Mount Lemmon Survey	·	1.8 km	MPC · JPL
372194	2008 TZ_{110}	—	October 6, 2008	Catalina	CSS	EOS	2.3 km	MPC · JPL
372195	2008 TS_{123}	—	October 8, 2008	Mount Lemmon	Mount Lemmon Survey	·	3.2 km	MPC · JPL
372196	2008 TX_{127}	—	October 8, 2008	Mount Lemmon	Mount Lemmon Survey	·	2.0 km	MPC · JPL
372197	2008 TN_{130}	—	October 8, 2008	Mount Lemmon	Mount Lemmon Survey	·	4.3 km	MPC · JPL
372198	2008 TC_{131}	—	September 23, 2008	Kitt Peak	Spacewatch	·	2.8 km	MPC · JPL
372199	2008 TM_{133}	—	September 10, 2008	Kitt Peak	Spacewatch	·	1.8 km	MPC · JPL
372200	2008 TA_{142}	—	October 9, 2008	Mount Lemmon	Mount Lemmon Survey	·	2.5 km	MPC · JPL

== 372201–372300 ==
back to top

Designation			Discovery			Properties		Ref
Permanent	Provisional	Named after	Date	Site	Discoverer(s)	Category	Diam.	Ref
372201	2008 TE_{143}	—	October 9, 2008	Mount Lemmon	Mount Lemmon Survey	·	3.4 km	MPC · JPL
372202	2008 TZ_{143}	—	October 9, 2008	Mount Lemmon	Mount Lemmon Survey	·	1.9 km	MPC · JPL
372203	2008 TD_{148}	—	October 9, 2008	Mount Lemmon	Mount Lemmon Survey	·	1.5 km	MPC · JPL
372204	2008 TJ_{152}	—	September 3, 2008	Kitt Peak	Spacewatch	·	3.1 km	MPC · JPL
372205	2008 TO_{154}	—	October 9, 2008	Mount Lemmon	Mount Lemmon Survey	TEL	1.9 km	MPC · JPL
372206	2008 TD_{158}	—	October 5, 2008	La Sagra	OAM	EOS	2.9 km	MPC · JPL
372207	2008 TT_{160}	—	October 2, 2008	Kitt Peak	Spacewatch	THM	2.5 km	MPC · JPL
372208	2008 TC_{163}	—	October 1, 2008	Catalina	CSS	·	3.7 km	MPC · JPL
372209	2008 TT_{169}	—	October 7, 2008	Kitt Peak	Spacewatch	·	2.6 km	MPC · JPL
372210	2008 TB_{170}	—	October 8, 2008	Catalina	CSS	·	2.7 km	MPC · JPL
372211	2008 TV_{173}	—	October 1, 2008	Catalina	CSS	EOS	2.3 km	MPC · JPL
372212	2008 TR_{177}	—	October 2, 2008	Catalina	CSS	EOS	2.4 km	MPC · JPL
372213	2008 TY_{189}	—	October 10, 2008	Socorro	LINEAR	EUP	7.9 km	MPC · JPL
372214	2008 UM_{2}	—	October 23, 2008	Desert Moon	Stevens, B. L.	·	3.6 km	MPC · JPL
372215	2008 UU_{11}	—	October 17, 2008	Kitt Peak	Spacewatch	EOS	2.2 km	MPC · JPL
372216	2008 UH_{12}	—	October 17, 2008	Kitt Peak	Spacewatch	·	2.5 km	MPC · JPL
372217	2008 UR_{12}	—	September 2, 2008	Kitt Peak	Spacewatch	·	1.8 km	MPC · JPL
372218	2008 UA_{22}	—	October 19, 2008	Kitt Peak	Spacewatch	·	1.4 km	MPC · JPL
372219	2008 UN_{29}	—	October 20, 2008	Kitt Peak	Spacewatch	·	4.8 km	MPC · JPL
372220	2008 UJ_{32}	—	October 20, 2008	Kitt Peak	Spacewatch	·	4.0 km	MPC · JPL
372221	2008 UQ_{33}	—	October 20, 2008	Mount Lemmon	Mount Lemmon Survey	·	2.4 km	MPC · JPL
372222	2008 UL_{36}	—	October 20, 2008	Kitt Peak	Spacewatch	·	3.2 km	MPC · JPL
372223	2008 UA_{46}	—	October 20, 2008	Kitt Peak	Spacewatch	·	3.4 km	MPC · JPL
372224	2008 US_{50}	—	September 25, 2008	Kitt Peak	Spacewatch	·	2.9 km	MPC · JPL
372225	2008 UB_{57}	—	October 21, 2008	Kitt Peak	Spacewatch	·	2.5 km	MPC · JPL
372226	2008 UB_{66}	—	October 21, 2008	Kitt Peak	Spacewatch	·	3.5 km	MPC · JPL
372227	2008 UJ_{71}	—	October 21, 2008	Mount Lemmon	Mount Lemmon Survey	·	3.1 km	MPC · JPL
372228	2008 UL_{77}	—	October 21, 2008	Kitt Peak	Spacewatch	·	4.5 km	MPC · JPL
372229	2008 UT_{79}	—	October 22, 2008	Kitt Peak	Spacewatch	·	2.7 km	MPC · JPL
372230	2008 UO_{80}	—	October 22, 2008	Kitt Peak	Spacewatch	CYB	4.0 km	MPC · JPL
372231	2008 UG_{86}	—	October 23, 2008	Kitt Peak	Spacewatch	·	2.2 km	MPC · JPL
372232	2008 UR_{91}	—	October 28, 2008	Wrightwood	J. W. Young	·	6.6 km	MPC · JPL
372233	2008 UF_{100}	—	October 27, 2008	Bisei SG Center	BATTeRS	·	2.7 km	MPC · JPL
372234	2008 UC_{107}	—	October 21, 2008	Kitt Peak	Spacewatch	HYG	2.9 km	MPC · JPL
372235	2008 UU_{111}	—	October 22, 2008	Kitt Peak	Spacewatch	·	4.3 km	MPC · JPL
372236	2008 UL_{116}	—	October 22, 2008	Kitt Peak	Spacewatch	·	3.2 km	MPC · JPL
372237	2008 UT_{117}	—	October 22, 2008	Kitt Peak	Spacewatch	·	3.0 km	MPC · JPL
372238	2008 UY_{120}	—	October 22, 2008	Kitt Peak	Spacewatch	·	3.0 km	MPC · JPL
372239	2008 UF_{122}	—	October 22, 2008	Kitt Peak	Spacewatch	·	4.1 km	MPC · JPL
372240	2008 UG_{124}	—	October 22, 2008	Kitt Peak	Spacewatch	EOS	2.5 km	MPC · JPL
372241	2008 UV_{124}	—	October 22, 2008	Kitt Peak	Spacewatch	·	3.0 km	MPC · JPL
372242	2008 UV_{125}	—	October 22, 2008	Kitt Peak	Spacewatch	·	3.4 km	MPC · JPL
372243	2008 US_{133}	—	October 23, 2008	Kitt Peak	Spacewatch	·	4.0 km	MPC · JPL
372244	2008 UL_{137}	—	October 23, 2008	Kitt Peak	Spacewatch	·	2.9 km	MPC · JPL
372245	2008 UY_{139}	—	September 22, 2008	Mount Lemmon	Mount Lemmon Survey	·	3.2 km	MPC · JPL
372246	2008 UP_{142}	—	October 23, 2008	Kitt Peak	Spacewatch	·	3.0 km	MPC · JPL
372247	2008 UE_{151}	—	October 23, 2008	Kitt Peak	Spacewatch	·	2.2 km	MPC · JPL
372248	2008 UX_{155}	—	October 23, 2008	Kitt Peak	Spacewatch	·	2.5 km	MPC · JPL
372249	2008 UG_{158}	—	October 23, 2008	Mount Lemmon	Mount Lemmon Survey	·	3.0 km	MPC · JPL
372250	2008 UT_{159}	—	October 23, 2008	Kitt Peak	Spacewatch	·	3.3 km	MPC · JPL
372251	2008 UW_{161}	—	October 24, 2008	Kitt Peak	Spacewatch	VER	2.2 km	MPC · JPL
372252	2008 UL_{162}	—	October 24, 2008	Kitt Peak	Spacewatch	·	3.3 km	MPC · JPL
372253	2008 UU_{182}	—	October 24, 2008	Mount Lemmon	Mount Lemmon Survey	THM	2.1 km	MPC · JPL
372254	2008 UL_{189}	—	October 25, 2008	Mount Lemmon	Mount Lemmon Survey	·	1.6 km	MPC · JPL
372255	2008 UF_{192}	—	October 25, 2008	Catalina	CSS	·	3.3 km	MPC · JPL
372256	2008 UX_{208}	—	October 23, 2008	Kitt Peak	Spacewatch	·	3.9 km	MPC · JPL
372257	2008 UX_{209}	—	October 23, 2008	Kitt Peak	Spacewatch	EOS	2.1 km	MPC · JPL
372258	2008 UG_{216}	—	October 24, 2008	Kitt Peak	Spacewatch	THM	2.5 km	MPC · JPL
372259	2008 US_{220}	—	October 25, 2008	Kitt Peak	Spacewatch	·	3.3 km	MPC · JPL
372260	2008 UJ_{236}	—	October 26, 2008	Kitt Peak	Spacewatch	·	4.2 km	MPC · JPL
372261	2008 UL_{242}	—	October 26, 2008	Mount Lemmon	Mount Lemmon Survey	·	3.6 km	MPC · JPL
372262	2008 UK_{245}	—	October 26, 2008	Kitt Peak	Spacewatch	CYB	3.3 km	MPC · JPL
372263	2008 UX_{253}	—	October 27, 2008	Kitt Peak	Spacewatch	·	3.7 km	MPC · JPL
372264	2008 UE_{254}	—	October 27, 2008	Kitt Peak	Spacewatch	·	2.9 km	MPC · JPL
372265	2008 UA_{258}	—	October 27, 2008	Kitt Peak	Spacewatch	(1298)	3.3 km	MPC · JPL
372266	2008 UM_{277}	—	September 22, 2008	Kitt Peak	Spacewatch	·	3.6 km	MPC · JPL
372267	2008 UF_{282}	—	October 28, 2008	Kitt Peak	Spacewatch	THM	2.0 km	MPC · JPL
372268	2008 UR_{285}	—	October 28, 2008	Mount Lemmon	Mount Lemmon Survey	·	2.8 km	MPC · JPL
372269	2008 UQ_{292}	—	October 7, 1999	Socorro	LINEAR	GEF	1.5 km	MPC · JPL
372270	2008 UW_{296}	—	October 29, 2008	Kitt Peak	Spacewatch	·	2.1 km	MPC · JPL
372271	2008 UC_{304}	—	October 29, 2008	Mount Lemmon	Mount Lemmon Survey	·	3.5 km	MPC · JPL
372272	2008 UG_{307}	—	October 30, 2008	Kitt Peak	Spacewatch	·	3.0 km	MPC · JPL
372273	2008 UN_{310}	—	October 30, 2008	Catalina	CSS	EOS	2.5 km	MPC · JPL
372274	2008 UH_{324}	—	October 31, 2008	Mount Lemmon	Mount Lemmon Survey	·	4.3 km	MPC · JPL
372275	2008 UG_{331}	—	October 31, 2008	Mount Lemmon	Mount Lemmon Survey	·	3.3 km	MPC · JPL
372276	2008 UQ_{337}	—	October 19, 2008	Kitt Peak	Spacewatch	·	2.5 km	MPC · JPL
372277	2008 UK_{341}	—	October 25, 2008	Mount Lemmon	Mount Lemmon Survey	·	3.1 km	MPC · JPL
372278	2008 UF_{343}	—	October 22, 2008	Kitt Peak	Spacewatch	LIX	4.8 km	MPC · JPL
372279	2008 UQ_{343}	—	October 20, 2008	Mount Lemmon	Mount Lemmon Survey	·	3.7 km	MPC · JPL
372280	2008 UH_{345}	—	October 31, 2008	Kitt Peak	Spacewatch	THM	2.5 km	MPC · JPL
372281	2008 UZ_{350}	—	October 25, 2008	Mount Lemmon	Mount Lemmon Survey	·	2.8 km	MPC · JPL
372282	2008 UW_{351}	—	October 26, 2008	Mount Lemmon	Mount Lemmon Survey	CYB	3.8 km	MPC · JPL
372283	2008 UN_{352}	—	October 26, 2008	Mount Lemmon	Mount Lemmon Survey	LIX	4.4 km	MPC · JPL
372284	2008 UZ_{360}	—	October 23, 2008	Kitt Peak	Spacewatch	·	3.1 km	MPC · JPL
372285	2008 UF_{361}	—	October 26, 2008	Catalina	CSS	·	3.6 km	MPC · JPL
372286	2008 UN_{368}	—	October 24, 2008	Kitt Peak	Spacewatch	·	2.9 km	MPC · JPL
372287	2008 UU_{368}	—	October 26, 2008	Mount Lemmon	Mount Lemmon Survey	·	3.0 km	MPC · JPL
372288	2008 VU_{1}	—	November 2, 2008	Socorro	LINEAR	·	5.4 km	MPC · JPL
372289	2008 VL_{3}	—	November 3, 2008	Socorro	LINEAR	·	6.1 km	MPC · JPL
372290	2008 VN_{5}	—	November 1, 2008	Mount Lemmon	Mount Lemmon Survey	·	4.0 km	MPC · JPL
372291	2008 VM_{8}	—	November 2, 2008	Mount Lemmon	Mount Lemmon Survey	EOS	2.6 km	MPC · JPL
372292	2008 VQ_{17}	—	November 1, 2008	Kitt Peak	Spacewatch	·	1.9 km	MPC · JPL
372293	2008 VR_{24}	—	November 1, 2008	Kitt Peak	Spacewatch	·	3.6 km	MPC · JPL
372294	2008 VE_{25}	—	October 8, 2008	Kitt Peak	Spacewatch	·	3.0 km	MPC · JPL
372295	2008 VN_{38}	—	November 2, 2008	Kitt Peak	Spacewatch	·	2.3 km	MPC · JPL
372296	2008 VD_{54}	—	November 6, 2008	Kitt Peak	Spacewatch	URS	4.0 km	MPC · JPL
372297	2008 VF_{57}	—	November 6, 2008	Mount Lemmon	Mount Lemmon Survey	·	2.4 km	MPC · JPL
372298	2008 VQ_{59}	—	November 7, 2008	Catalina	CSS	·	3.7 km	MPC · JPL
372299	2008 VN_{73}	—	November 6, 2008	Mount Lemmon	Mount Lemmon Survey	CYB	4.6 km	MPC · JPL
372300	2008 VU_{77}	—	November 6, 2008	Mount Lemmon	Mount Lemmon Survey	·	3.2 km	MPC · JPL

== 372301–372400 ==
back to top

Designation			Discovery			Properties		Ref
Permanent	Provisional	Named after	Date	Site	Discoverer(s)	Category	Diam.	Ref
372301	2008 WA_{12}	—	October 31, 2008	Kitt Peak	Spacewatch	·	3.1 km	MPC · JPL
372302	2008 WO_{15}	—	November 9, 2008	Mount Lemmon	Mount Lemmon Survey	THM	2.2 km	MPC · JPL
372303	2008 WT_{58}	—	November 21, 2008	Kitt Peak	Spacewatch	H	740 m	MPC · JPL
372304	2008 WP_{60}	—	November 22, 2008	Hibiscus	Teamo, N.	VER	5.5 km	MPC · JPL
372305 Bourdeille	2008 WO_{61}	Bourdeille	November 20, 2008	Vicques	M. Ory	THM	1.9 km	MPC · JPL
372306	2008 WB_{63}	—	November 20, 2008	Socorro	LINEAR	·	3.1 km	MPC · JPL
372307	2008 WR_{66}	—	November 18, 2008	Kitt Peak	Spacewatch	·	2.3 km	MPC · JPL
372308	2008 WT_{67}	—	November 18, 2008	Kitt Peak	Spacewatch	THM	2.4 km	MPC · JPL
372309	2008 WW_{88}	—	November 21, 2008	Kitt Peak	Spacewatch	·	5.1 km	MPC · JPL
372310	2008 WR_{94}	—	November 29, 2008	Mayhill	Lowe, A.	·	2.7 km	MPC · JPL
372311	2008 WM_{107}	—	November 30, 2008	Catalina	CSS	·	4.2 km	MPC · JPL
372312	2008 WL_{111}	—	November 30, 2008	Kitt Peak	Spacewatch	THM	2.4 km	MPC · JPL
372313	2008 WT_{111}	—	November 30, 2008	Kitt Peak	Spacewatch	CYB	3.3 km	MPC · JPL
372314	2008 WN_{135}	—	November 18, 2008	Kitt Peak	Spacewatch	·	6.4 km	MPC · JPL
372315	2008 WT_{140}	—	November 19, 2008	Catalina	CSS	·	2.4 km	MPC · JPL
372316	2008 XM_{3}	—	December 2, 2008	Socorro	LINEAR	·	3.9 km	MPC · JPL
372317	2008 XS_{14}	—	December 1, 2008	Kitt Peak	Spacewatch	KOR	1.5 km	MPC · JPL
372318	2008 XC_{35}	—	December 2, 2008	Kitt Peak	Spacewatch	·	3.7 km	MPC · JPL
372319	2008 XP_{47}	—	December 4, 2008	Kitt Peak	Spacewatch	THM	2.1 km	MPC · JPL
372320	2008 XL_{52}	—	December 1, 2008	Socorro	LINEAR	HYG	3.3 km	MPC · JPL
372321	2008 YR_{3}	—	December 21, 2008	Dauban	Kugel, F.	THM	2.6 km	MPC · JPL
372322	2008 YD_{9}	—	December 23, 2008	Dauban	Kugel, F.	ARM	5.2 km	MPC · JPL
372323	2008 YO_{12}	—	November 19, 2008	Mount Lemmon	Mount Lemmon Survey	·	4.5 km	MPC · JPL
372324	2008 YN_{23}	—	December 20, 2008	La Sagra	OAM	THM	2.3 km	MPC · JPL
372325	2009 AV_{15}	—	December 21, 2008	Catalina	CSS	·	1.3 km	MPC · JPL
372326	2009 AN_{46}	—	January 1, 2009	Mount Lemmon	Mount Lemmon Survey	3:2	6.7 km	MPC · JPL
372327	2009 BQ_{14}	—	January 16, 2009	Kitt Peak	Spacewatch	·	6.0 km	MPC · JPL
372328	2009 BH_{68}	—	December 31, 2008	Mount Lemmon	Mount Lemmon Survey	·	730 m	MPC · JPL
372329	2009 BL_{75}	—	January 23, 2009	Purple Mountain	PMO NEO Survey Program	H	520 m	MPC · JPL
372330	2009 BW_{76}	—	January 28, 2009	Catalina	CSS	H	720 m	MPC · JPL
372331	2009 BU_{142}	—	January 30, 2009	Kitt Peak	Spacewatch	H	570 m	MPC · JPL
372332	2009 BY_{178}	—	January 31, 2009	Mount Lemmon	Mount Lemmon Survey	·	880 m	MPC · JPL
372333	2009 CS_{24}	—	February 1, 2009	Kitt Peak	Spacewatch	·	4.4 km	MPC · JPL
372334	2009 CK_{53}	—	December 30, 2008	Catalina	CSS	H	700 m	MPC · JPL
372335	2009 DJ_{4}	—	February 4, 2009	Catalina	CSS	H	760 m	MPC · JPL
372336	2009 DQ_{13}	—	February 16, 2009	Kitt Peak	Spacewatch	·	610 m	MPC · JPL
372337	2009 DF_{82}	—	February 24, 2009	Kitt Peak	Spacewatch	·	670 m	MPC · JPL
372338	2009 DQ_{82}	—	February 24, 2009	Kitt Peak	Spacewatch	·	750 m	MPC · JPL
372339	2009 DS_{82}	—	February 24, 2009	Kitt Peak	Spacewatch	·	810 m	MPC · JPL
372340	2009 DY_{93}	—	February 28, 2009	Mount Lemmon	Mount Lemmon Survey	·	970 m	MPC · JPL
372341	2009 DG_{94}	—	February 28, 2009	Mount Lemmon	Mount Lemmon Survey	·	810 m	MPC · JPL
372342	2009 DF_{97}	—	February 26, 2009	Kitt Peak	Spacewatch	·	1.3 km	MPC · JPL
372343	2009 EL_{25}	—	March 3, 2009	Kitt Peak	Spacewatch	·	570 m	MPC · JPL
372344	2009 EG_{28}	—	March 1, 2009	Mount Lemmon	Mount Lemmon Survey	·	820 m	MPC · JPL
372345	2009 FG_{21}	—	March 21, 2009	Mount Lemmon	Mount Lemmon Survey	·	550 m	MPC · JPL
372346	2009 FA_{23}	—	March 19, 2009	Bergisch Gladbach	W. Bickel	·	670 m	MPC · JPL
372347	2009 FK_{31}	—	March 25, 2009	La Sagra	OAM	PHO	1.8 km	MPC · JPL
372348	2009 FS_{36}	—	March 26, 2009	Mount Lemmon	Mount Lemmon Survey	·	470 m	MPC · JPL
372349	2009 FF_{46}	—	March 23, 2009	XuYi	PMO NEO Survey Program	·	780 m	MPC · JPL
372350	2009 FT_{47}	—	March 16, 2009	Kitt Peak	Spacewatch	·	830 m	MPC · JPL
372351	2009 FV_{66}	—	March 24, 2009	Kitt Peak	Spacewatch	·	720 m	MPC · JPL
372352	2009 FA_{71}	—	March 28, 2009	Kitt Peak	Spacewatch	·	550 m	MPC · JPL
372353	2009 FG_{71}	—	March 29, 2009	Kitt Peak	Spacewatch	·	660 m	MPC · JPL
372354	2009 FD_{74}	—	March 31, 2009	Kitt Peak	Spacewatch	·	600 m	MPC · JPL
372355	2009 HL_{1}	—	April 17, 2009	Catalina	CSS	·	700 m	MPC · JPL
372356	2009 HY_{5}	—	March 29, 2009	Kitt Peak	Spacewatch	·	660 m	MPC · JPL
372357	2009 HZ_{13}	—	March 24, 2009	Mount Lemmon	Mount Lemmon Survey	·	1.1 km	MPC · JPL
372358	2009 HR_{21}	—	April 16, 2009	Catalina	CSS	·	720 m	MPC · JPL
372359	2009 HN_{29}	—	April 19, 2009	Kitt Peak	Spacewatch	·	680 m	MPC · JPL
372360	2009 HX_{42}	—	April 20, 2009	Kitt Peak	Spacewatch	·	640 m	MPC · JPL
372361	2009 HC_{47}	—	September 30, 2003	Kitt Peak	Spacewatch	·	730 m	MPC · JPL
372362	2009 HK_{77}	—	April 21, 2009	La Sagra	OAM	·	560 m	MPC · JPL
372363	2009 HX_{93}	—	April 30, 2009	Kitt Peak	Spacewatch	·	1.2 km	MPC · JPL
372364	2009 HE_{102}	—	April 20, 2009	Mount Lemmon	Mount Lemmon Survey	·	680 m	MPC · JPL
372365	2009 JH_{2}	—	March 2, 2009	Mount Lemmon	Mount Lemmon Survey	ERI	2.4 km	MPC · JPL
372366	2009 JQ_{6}	—	May 13, 2009	Mount Lemmon	Mount Lemmon Survey	·	960 m	MPC · JPL
372367	2009 KP_{7}	—	May 21, 2009	Cerro Burek	Burek, Cerro	(883)	720 m	MPC · JPL
372368	2009 KR_{20}	—	May 29, 2009	Mount Lemmon	Mount Lemmon Survey	·	1.1 km	MPC · JPL
372369	2009 LC	—	June 2, 2009	La Sagra	OAM	·	2.5 km	MPC · JPL
372370	2009 LM_{1}	—	June 12, 2009	Kitt Peak	Spacewatch	·	810 m	MPC · JPL
372371	2009 MK	—	May 28, 2009	Mount Lemmon	Mount Lemmon Survey	PHO	1.4 km	MPC · JPL
372372	2009 OO_{4}	—	July 19, 2009	La Sagra	OAM	MAS	830 m	MPC · JPL
372373	2009 OV_{4}	—	July 21, 2009	La Sagra	OAM	·	1.6 km	MPC · JPL
372374	2009 OK_{21}	—	July 25, 2009	La Sagra	OAM	NYS	1.5 km	MPC · JPL
372375	2009 OJ_{22}	—	July 28, 2009	La Sagra	OAM	PHO	1.4 km	MPC · JPL
372376	2009 OC_{25}	—	March 2, 2008	Kitt Peak	Spacewatch	·	1.7 km	MPC · JPL
372377	2009 PN_{4}	—	August 14, 2009	La Sagra	OAM	·	1.7 km	MPC · JPL
372378	2009 PP_{4}	—	August 14, 2009	La Sagra	OAM	·	1.2 km	MPC · JPL
372379	2009 PW_{9}	—	August 14, 2009	La Sagra	OAM	·	1.3 km	MPC · JPL
372380	2009 PQ_{11}	—	August 15, 2009	Kitt Peak	Spacewatch	·	2.0 km	MPC · JPL
372381	2009 PC_{12}	—	September 11, 2005	Kitt Peak	Spacewatch	·	1.4 km	MPC · JPL
372382	2009 PA_{14}	—	November 16, 2006	Kitt Peak	Spacewatch	·	1.4 km	MPC · JPL
372383	2009 PX_{16}	—	August 15, 2009	Kitt Peak	Spacewatch	·	1.9 km	MPC · JPL
372384	2009 PA_{20}	—	August 15, 2009	Kitt Peak	Spacewatch	·	1.1 km	MPC · JPL
372385	2009 QY_{9}	—	August 22, 2009	Pla D'Arguines	R. Ferrando	·	2.5 km	MPC · JPL
372386	2009 QK_{12}	—	August 16, 2009	Kitt Peak	Spacewatch	·	910 m	MPC · JPL
372387	2009 QK_{14}	—	August 16, 2009	Kitt Peak	Spacewatch	·	1.0 km	MPC · JPL
372388	2009 QB_{15}	—	August 16, 2009	Kitt Peak	Spacewatch	·	780 m	MPC · JPL
372389	2009 QJ_{15}	—	August 16, 2009	Kitt Peak	Spacewatch	·	1.0 km	MPC · JPL
372390	2009 QH_{21}	—	August 19, 2009	La Sagra	OAM	·	1.5 km	MPC · JPL
372391	2009 QK_{31}	—	August 20, 2009	La Sagra	OAM	BRG	1.5 km	MPC · JPL
372392	2009 QC_{34}	—	August 19, 2009	Catalina	CSS	·	2.3 km	MPC · JPL
372393	2009 QM_{34}	—	August 27, 2009	Sierra Stars	R. Matson	·	1.2 km	MPC · JPL
372394	2009 QW_{34}	—	August 28, 2009	Socorro	LINEAR	HNS	1.5 km	MPC · JPL
372395	2009 QH_{35}	—	August 26, 2009	Wildberg	R. Apitzsch	·	1.3 km	MPC · JPL
372396	2009 QN_{44}	—	August 27, 2009	Kitt Peak	Spacewatch	(5)	1.0 km	MPC · JPL
372397	2009 QU_{44}	—	August 27, 2009	Kitt Peak	Spacewatch	NYS	1.4 km	MPC · JPL
372398	2009 QS_{58}	—	August 19, 2009	Kitt Peak	Spacewatch	V	790 m	MPC · JPL
372399	2009 QN_{62}	—	August 29, 2009	Kitt Peak	Spacewatch	EUN	1.3 km	MPC · JPL
372400	2009 RM_{3}	—	September 11, 2009	La Sagra	OAM	·	2.4 km	MPC · JPL

== 372401–372500 ==
back to top

Designation			Discovery			Properties		Ref
Permanent	Provisional	Named after	Date	Site	Discoverer(s)	Category	Diam.	Ref
372401	2009 RX_{9}	—	September 12, 2009	Kitt Peak	Spacewatch	HNS	1.1 km	MPC · JPL
372402	2009 RZ_{11}	—	September 12, 2009	Kitt Peak	Spacewatch	·	2.2 km	MPC · JPL
372403	2009 RN_{12}	—	September 12, 2009	Kitt Peak	Spacewatch	·	1.7 km	MPC · JPL
372404	2009 RP_{15}	—	September 12, 2009	Kitt Peak	Spacewatch	·	1.8 km	MPC · JPL
372405	2009 RB_{17}	—	November 21, 2005	Kitt Peak	Spacewatch	·	1.4 km	MPC · JPL
372406	2009 RE_{23}	—	July 31, 2009	Kitt Peak	Spacewatch	·	1.2 km	MPC · JPL
372407	2009 RF_{33}	—	September 14, 2009	Kitt Peak	Spacewatch	EUN	1.7 km	MPC · JPL
372408	2009 RD_{36}	—	September 15, 2009	Kitt Peak	Spacewatch	·	1.3 km	MPC · JPL
372409	2009 RW_{36}	—	September 15, 2009	Kitt Peak	Spacewatch	·	980 m	MPC · JPL
372410	2009 RD_{43}	—	September 15, 2009	Kitt Peak	Spacewatch	·	2.1 km	MPC · JPL
372411	2009 RE_{43}	—	September 15, 2009	Kitt Peak	Spacewatch	PAD	1.6 km	MPC · JPL
372412	2009 RP_{43}	—	September 15, 2009	Kitt Peak	Spacewatch	(5)	1.2 km	MPC · JPL
372413	2009 RK_{45}	—	September 15, 2009	Kitt Peak	Spacewatch	·	1.5 km	MPC · JPL
372414	2009 RZ_{46}	—	November 25, 2005	Catalina	CSS	(1547)	1.5 km	MPC · JPL
372415	2009 RX_{47}	—	September 15, 2009	Kitt Peak	Spacewatch	·	2.0 km	MPC · JPL
372416	2009 RN_{49}	—	September 15, 2009	Kitt Peak	Spacewatch	·	2.3 km	MPC · JPL
372417	2009 RO_{49}	—	September 15, 2009	Kitt Peak	Spacewatch	·	2.3 km	MPC · JPL
372418	2009 RD_{51}	—	September 15, 2009	Kitt Peak	Spacewatch	·	2.6 km	MPC · JPL
372419	2009 RE_{60}	—	September 11, 2009	Catalina	CSS	·	2.3 km	MPC · JPL
372420	2009 RW_{61}	—	September 14, 2009	La Sagra	OAM	·	1.4 km	MPC · JPL
372421	2009 SO_{1}	—	September 16, 2009	Kachina	Hobart, J.	·	1.3 km	MPC · JPL
372422	2009 SP_{16}	—	September 16, 2009	Kitt Peak	Spacewatch	·	1.5 km	MPC · JPL
372423	2009 SG_{25}	—	April 11, 2003	Kitt Peak	Spacewatch	EUN	1.3 km	MPC · JPL
372424	2009 SB_{31}	—	September 16, 2009	Kitt Peak	Spacewatch	·	970 m	MPC · JPL
372425	2009 SM_{34}	—	September 16, 2009	Kitt Peak	Spacewatch	·	1.1 km	MPC · JPL
372426	2009 SP_{35}	—	September 16, 2009	Kitt Peak	Spacewatch	GEF	1.3 km	MPC · JPL
372427	2009 ST_{35}	—	September 16, 2009	Kitt Peak	Spacewatch	·	2.2 km	MPC · JPL
372428	2009 ST_{36}	—	September 16, 2009	Kitt Peak	Spacewatch	·	1.2 km	MPC · JPL
372429	2009 SY_{36}	—	September 16, 2009	Kitt Peak	Spacewatch	·	1.6 km	MPC · JPL
372430	2009 SE_{42}	—	September 16, 2009	Kitt Peak	Spacewatch	GEF	1.3 km	MPC · JPL
372431	2009 SG_{42}	—	September 16, 2009	Kitt Peak	Spacewatch	·	2.0 km	MPC · JPL
372432	2009 SQ_{46}	—	September 16, 2009	Kitt Peak	Spacewatch	·	1.5 km	MPC · JPL
372433	2009 SM_{48}	—	September 16, 2009	Kitt Peak	Spacewatch	·	1.6 km	MPC · JPL
372434	2009 SO_{48}	—	September 16, 2009	Kitt Peak	Spacewatch	AGN	1.4 km	MPC · JPL
372435	2009 SE_{49}	—	September 17, 2009	La Sagra	OAM	·	2.0 km	MPC · JPL
372436	2009 SK_{53}	—	September 17, 2009	Catalina	CSS	(5)	1.3 km	MPC · JPL
372437	2009 SX_{54}	—	August 27, 2009	Kitt Peak	Spacewatch	·	1.2 km	MPC · JPL
372438	2009 SU_{70}	—	March 11, 2007	Kitt Peak	Spacewatch	·	2.4 km	MPC · JPL
372439	2009 SJ_{71}	—	November 4, 2005	Mount Lemmon	Mount Lemmon Survey	·	1.4 km	MPC · JPL
372440	2009 SY_{71}	—	September 17, 2009	Mount Lemmon	Mount Lemmon Survey	·	1.1 km	MPC · JPL
372441	2009 SS_{72}	—	September 17, 2009	Mount Lemmon	Mount Lemmon Survey	·	1.4 km	MPC · JPL
372442	2009 SV_{72}	—	September 17, 2009	Mount Lemmon	Mount Lemmon Survey	·	1.2 km	MPC · JPL
372443	2009 SV_{73}	—	September 17, 2009	Kitt Peak	Spacewatch	HOF	2.3 km	MPC · JPL
372444	2009 SL_{86}	—	September 18, 2009	Kitt Peak	Spacewatch	·	1.9 km	MPC · JPL
372445	2009 SJ_{92}	—	September 18, 2009	Mount Lemmon	Mount Lemmon Survey	·	1.6 km	MPC · JPL
372446	2009 SS_{95}	—	September 12, 2009	Kitt Peak	Spacewatch	·	2.1 km	MPC · JPL
372447	2009 SC_{96}	—	September 19, 2009	Kitt Peak	Spacewatch	·	1.5 km	MPC · JPL
372448	2009 SV_{96}	—	September 19, 2009	Mount Lemmon	Mount Lemmon Survey	HOF	2.7 km	MPC · JPL
372449	2009 SP_{100}	—	September 18, 2009	Kitt Peak	Spacewatch	·	1.6 km	MPC · JPL
372450	2009 SV_{104}	—	September 26, 2009	Mount Lemmon	Mount Lemmon Survey	EUP	5.9 km	MPC · JPL
372451	2009 SK_{114}	—	September 18, 2009	Kitt Peak	Spacewatch	·	1.2 km	MPC · JPL
372452	2009 SK_{124}	—	September 18, 2009	Kitt Peak	Spacewatch	·	2.1 km	MPC · JPL
372453	2009 SD_{125}	—	September 18, 2009	Kitt Peak	Spacewatch	·	1.6 km	MPC · JPL
372454	2009 SP_{127}	—	September 18, 2009	Kitt Peak	Spacewatch	·	1.2 km	MPC · JPL
372455	2009 SF_{131}	—	September 18, 2009	Kitt Peak	Spacewatch	·	1.8 km	MPC · JPL
372456	2009 SL_{134}	—	September 18, 2009	Kitt Peak	Spacewatch	·	1.4 km	MPC · JPL
372457	2009 SX_{134}	—	September 18, 2009	Kitt Peak	Spacewatch	·	1.6 km	MPC · JPL
372458	2009 SR_{135}	—	September 18, 2009	Kitt Peak	Spacewatch	·	2.4 km	MPC · JPL
372459	2009 SF_{136}	—	September 18, 2009	Kitt Peak	Spacewatch	·	1.0 km	MPC · JPL
372460	2009 SM_{138}	—	September 18, 2009	Kitt Peak	Spacewatch	·	1.3 km	MPC · JPL
372461	2009 SV_{138}	—	September 18, 2009	Mount Lemmon	Mount Lemmon Survey	·	2.0 km	MPC · JPL
372462	2009 SH_{141}	—	September 19, 2009	Kitt Peak	Spacewatch	·	1.9 km	MPC · JPL
372463	2009 SE_{145}	—	September 19, 2009	Mount Lemmon	Mount Lemmon Survey	·	1.5 km	MPC · JPL
372464	2009 SE_{147}	—	September 19, 2009	Kitt Peak	Spacewatch	·	1.7 km	MPC · JPL
372465	2009 SF_{154}	—	September 20, 2009	Kitt Peak	Spacewatch	·	1.0 km	MPC · JPL
372466	2009 SJ_{156}	—	September 20, 2009	Kitt Peak	Spacewatch	·	1.1 km	MPC · JPL
372467	2009 SH_{157}	—	September 14, 2009	Kitt Peak	Spacewatch	·	3.7 km	MPC · JPL
372468	2009 SX_{157}	—	September 20, 2009	Mount Lemmon	Mount Lemmon Survey	·	2.7 km	MPC · JPL
372469	2009 SE_{160}	—	September 20, 2009	Kitt Peak	Spacewatch	·	1.1 km	MPC · JPL
372470	2009 SK_{170}	—	September 26, 2009	Saint-Sulpice	B. Christophe	·	1.7 km	MPC · JPL
372471	2009 SL_{172}	—	October 22, 2005	Kitt Peak	Spacewatch	·	1.6 km	MPC · JPL
372472	2009 SX_{183}	—	September 21, 2009	Kitt Peak	Spacewatch	·	2.0 km	MPC · JPL
372473	2009 SB_{184}	—	September 21, 2009	Kitt Peak	Spacewatch	(5)	1.3 km	MPC · JPL
372474	2009 SW_{184}	—	September 21, 2009	Kitt Peak	Spacewatch	·	1.6 km	MPC · JPL
372475	2009 SK_{185}	—	September 21, 2009	Kitt Peak	Spacewatch	·	1.3 km	MPC · JPL
372476	2009 SN_{200}	—	September 22, 2009	Kitt Peak	Spacewatch	·	920 m	MPC · JPL
372477	2009 SH_{203}	—	September 22, 2009	Kitt Peak	Spacewatch	·	2.0 km	MPC · JPL
372478	2009 SC_{204}	—	September 22, 2009	Kitt Peak	Spacewatch	·	2.1 km	MPC · JPL
372479	2009 SD_{204}	—	September 22, 2009	Kitt Peak	Spacewatch	EUN	1.4 km	MPC · JPL
372480	2009 SA_{206}	—	September 22, 2009	Kitt Peak	Spacewatch	HNS	1.4 km	MPC · JPL
372481	2009 SU_{209}	—	September 23, 2009	Kitt Peak	Spacewatch	NEM	2.2 km	MPC · JPL
372482	2009 SX_{210}	—	September 23, 2009	Kitt Peak	Spacewatch	·	1.5 km	MPC · JPL
372483	2009 SE_{211}	—	September 23, 2009	Kitt Peak	Spacewatch	·	1.9 km	MPC · JPL
372484	2009 SY_{213}	—	September 23, 2009	Kitt Peak	Spacewatch	·	2.3 km	MPC · JPL
372485	2009 SL_{216}	—	September 24, 2009	Kitt Peak	Spacewatch	·	1.5 km	MPC · JPL
372486	2009 SG_{222}	—	September 16, 2009	Kitt Peak	Spacewatch	·	1.7 km	MPC · JPL
372487	2009 SH_{225}	—	September 25, 2009	Mount Lemmon	Mount Lemmon Survey	·	2.2 km	MPC · JPL
372488	2009 SC_{233}	—	September 19, 2009	Kitt Peak	Spacewatch	·	1.2 km	MPC · JPL
372489	2009 SF_{233}	—	September 19, 2009	Catalina	CSS	·	1.4 km	MPC · JPL
372490	2009 SC_{235}	—	September 18, 2009	Catalina	CSS	·	1.9 km	MPC · JPL
372491	2009 SR_{240}	—	September 18, 2009	Catalina	CSS	·	1.8 km	MPC · JPL
372492	2009 SM_{241}	—	September 18, 2009	Catalina	CSS	·	1.8 km	MPC · JPL
372493	2009 SO_{243}	—	September 24, 2009	La Sagra	OAM	EUN	1.1 km	MPC · JPL
372494	2009 SO_{249}	—	September 18, 2009	Kitt Peak	Spacewatch	(5)	920 m	MPC · JPL
372495	2009 SW_{249}	—	September 18, 2009	Kitt Peak	Spacewatch	·	1.5 km	MPC · JPL
372496	2009 SM_{253}	—	September 23, 2009	Kitt Peak	Spacewatch	·	1.2 km	MPC · JPL
372497	2009 SW_{254}	—	September 16, 2009	Catalina	CSS	·	1.7 km	MPC · JPL
372498	2009 SL_{261}	—	September 22, 2009	Catalina	CSS	·	2.0 km	MPC · JPL
372499	2009 SH_{262}	—	September 15, 2009	Kitt Peak	Spacewatch	·	1.9 km	MPC · JPL
372500	2009 SH_{266}	—	April 26, 2003	Kitt Peak	Spacewatch	·	2.0 km	MPC · JPL

== 372501–372600 ==
back to top

Designation			Discovery			Properties		Ref
Permanent	Provisional	Named after	Date	Site	Discoverer(s)	Category	Diam.	Ref
372501	2009 SN_{272}	—	September 24, 2009	Kitt Peak	Spacewatch	·	1.2 km	MPC · JPL
372502	2009 SJ_{275}	—	September 25, 2009	Kitt Peak	Spacewatch	·	2.0 km	MPC · JPL
372503	2009 SE_{277}	—	September 25, 2009	Kitt Peak	Spacewatch	·	1.9 km	MPC · JPL
372504	2009 ST_{277}	—	September 17, 2009	Kitt Peak	Spacewatch	·	1.4 km	MPC · JPL
372505	2009 SR_{278}	—	September 25, 2009	Kitt Peak	Spacewatch	(5)	1.8 km	MPC · JPL
372506	2009 SX_{280}	—	September 25, 2009	Kitt Peak	Spacewatch	BRG	1.4 km	MPC · JPL
372507	2009 SO_{282}	—	September 25, 2009	Kitt Peak	Spacewatch	·	1.9 km	MPC · JPL
372508	2009 SQ_{283}	—	September 25, 2009	Kitt Peak	Spacewatch	·	2.0 km	MPC · JPL
372509	2009 SZ_{283}	—	September 25, 2009	Kitt Peak	Spacewatch	·	1.6 km	MPC · JPL
372510	2009 SF_{284}	—	September 25, 2009	Kitt Peak	Spacewatch	·	1.8 km	MPC · JPL
372511	2009 SU_{286}	—	September 25, 2009	Kitt Peak	Spacewatch	·	1.8 km	MPC · JPL
372512	2009 SQ_{287}	—	September 25, 2009	Kitt Peak	Spacewatch	·	1.3 km	MPC · JPL
372513	2009 SG_{288}	—	September 25, 2009	Kitt Peak	Spacewatch	WIT	1.1 km	MPC · JPL
372514	2009 SM_{288}	—	September 25, 2009	Kitt Peak	Spacewatch	·	1.4 km	MPC · JPL
372515	2009 SA_{297}	—	September 28, 2009	Catalina	CSS	·	2.0 km	MPC · JPL
372516	2009 SH_{297}	—	September 28, 2009	Catalina	CSS	·	2.2 km	MPC · JPL
372517	2009 SW_{312}	—	September 18, 2009	Catalina	CSS	·	1.1 km	MPC · JPL
372518	2009 SB_{316}	—	September 19, 2009	Kitt Peak	Spacewatch	·	1.7 km	MPC · JPL
372519	2009 SS_{319}	—	September 20, 2009	Kitt Peak	Spacewatch	·	640 m	MPC · JPL
372520	2009 SZ_{326}	—	September 20, 2009	Mount Lemmon	Mount Lemmon Survey	(5)	1.7 km	MPC · JPL
372521	2009 SS_{337}	—	September 28, 2009	Catalina	CSS	·	1.6 km	MPC · JPL
372522	2009 SF_{342}	—	September 16, 2009	Kitt Peak	Spacewatch	·	1.7 km	MPC · JPL
372523	2009 SN_{342}	—	September 16, 2009	Mount Lemmon	Mount Lemmon Survey	RAF	1.0 km	MPC · JPL
372524	2009 SU_{342}	—	September 17, 2009	Kitt Peak	Spacewatch	·	1.3 km	MPC · JPL
372525	2009 SC_{344}	—	September 17, 2009	Kitt Peak	Spacewatch	·	1.9 km	MPC · JPL
372526	2009 SN_{344}	—	September 18, 2009	Kitt Peak	Spacewatch	(17392)	1.2 km	MPC · JPL
372527	2009 SQ_{352}	—	September 27, 2009	Kitt Peak	Spacewatch	ARM	5.9 km	MPC · JPL
372528	2009 SF_{357}	—	September 21, 2009	Mount Lemmon	Mount Lemmon Survey	·	2.0 km	MPC · JPL
372529	2009 ST_{358}	—	September 18, 2009	Catalina	CSS	·	1.9 km	MPC · JPL
372530	2009 SY_{360}	—	September 21, 2009	Mount Lemmon	Mount Lemmon Survey	·	1.9 km	MPC · JPL
372531	2009 SN_{361}	—	September 27, 2009	Socorro	LINEAR	·	2.9 km	MPC · JPL
372532	2009 SO_{363}	—	September 19, 2009	Mount Lemmon	Mount Lemmon Survey	·	1.4 km	MPC · JPL
372533	2009 TZ	—	October 10, 2009	Pla D'Arguines	R. Ferrando	·	2.5 km	MPC · JPL
372534	2009 TS_{1}	—	October 8, 2009	La Sagra	OAM	(5)	1.1 km	MPC · JPL
372535	2009 TU_{1}	—	September 18, 2009	Kitt Peak	Spacewatch	·	1.3 km	MPC · JPL
372536	2009 TR_{3}	—	October 11, 2009	Mount Lemmon	Mount Lemmon Survey	·	1.7 km	MPC · JPL
372537	2009 TN_{6}	—	October 12, 2009	La Sagra	OAM	(5)	1.8 km	MPC · JPL
372538	2009 TF_{7}	—	October 13, 2009	La Sagra	OAM	·	1.8 km	MPC · JPL
372539	2009 TD_{9}	—	September 28, 2009	Catalina	CSS	·	1.7 km	MPC · JPL
372540	2009 TN_{9}	—	October 14, 2009	Bisei SG Center	BATTeRS	·	1.5 km	MPC · JPL
372541	2009 TL_{15}	—	October 14, 2009	Catalina	CSS	NYS	1.2 km	MPC · JPL
372542	2009 TM_{15}	—	October 14, 2009	Taunus	Karge, S., R. Kling	·	1.3 km	MPC · JPL
372543	2009 TL_{18}	—	September 19, 2009	Kitt Peak	Spacewatch	·	1.5 km	MPC · JPL
372544	2009 TJ_{23}	—	October 14, 2009	La Sagra	OAM	·	2.3 km	MPC · JPL
372545	2009 TV_{25}	—	September 6, 1999	Kitt Peak	Spacewatch	·	3.5 km	MPC · JPL
372546	2009 TK_{26}	—	October 14, 2009	La Sagra	OAM	MAR	1.3 km	MPC · JPL
372547	2009 TK_{27}	—	October 14, 2009	La Sagra	OAM	·	1.8 km	MPC · JPL
372548	2009 TS_{33}	—	September 25, 1992	Kitt Peak	Spacewatch	·	2.0 km	MPC · JPL
372549	2009 TC_{34}	—	October 10, 2009	La Sagra	OAM	KON	2.7 km	MPC · JPL
372550	2009 TA_{35}	—	October 14, 2009	La Sagra	OAM	·	1.1 km	MPC · JPL
372551	2009 TK_{36}	—	October 14, 2009	Purple Mountain	PMO NEO Survey Program	·	2.4 km	MPC · JPL
372552	2009 TC_{38}	—	October 14, 2009	Catalina	CSS	·	1.8 km	MPC · JPL
372553	2009 TN_{44}	—	October 15, 2009	Catalina	CSS	·	2.5 km	MPC · JPL
372554	2009 UY_{1}	—	October 17, 2009	Hibiscus	Teamo, N.	MAR	1.3 km	MPC · JPL
372555	2009 UJ_{2}	—	October 27, 2005	Catalina	CSS	EUN	1.2 km	MPC · JPL
372556	2009 UG_{3}	—	October 18, 2009	Tiki	Teamo, N.	·	2.3 km	MPC · JPL
372557	2009 UG_{4}	—	October 17, 2009	Bisei SG Center	BATTeRS	·	2.4 km	MPC · JPL
372558	2009 UG_{5}	—	October 20, 2009	Mayhill	Lowe, A.	·	2.4 km	MPC · JPL
372559	2009 UX_{12}	—	October 17, 2009	Mount Lemmon	Mount Lemmon Survey	·	1.4 km	MPC · JPL
372560	2009 UH_{15}	—	September 28, 2009	Mount Lemmon	Mount Lemmon Survey	MRX	1.0 km	MPC · JPL
372561	2009 UM_{17}	—	October 20, 2009	Bisei SG Center	BATTeRS	·	2.0 km	MPC · JPL
372562	2009 UN_{20}	—	October 25, 2009	Tzec Maun	L. Elenin	HNS	1.5 km	MPC · JPL
372563	2009 UC_{33}	—	October 18, 2009	Mount Lemmon	Mount Lemmon Survey	·	1.7 km	MPC · JPL
372564	2009 UH_{36}	—	October 22, 2009	Mount Lemmon	Mount Lemmon Survey	·	2.2 km	MPC · JPL
372565	2009 UL_{39}	—	October 22, 2009	Mount Lemmon	Mount Lemmon Survey	·	3.7 km	MPC · JPL
372566	2009 UU_{39}	—	October 22, 2009	Mount Lemmon	Mount Lemmon Survey	·	1.7 km	MPC · JPL
372567	2009 UF_{46}	—	October 18, 2009	Mount Lemmon	Mount Lemmon Survey	NEM	2.4 km	MPC · JPL
372568	2009 US_{47}	—	October 18, 2009	Kitt Peak	Spacewatch	·	1.9 km	MPC · JPL
372569	2009 UJ_{49}	—	October 22, 2009	Mount Lemmon	Mount Lemmon Survey	·	2.2 km	MPC · JPL
372570	2009 UF_{52}	—	October 11, 2009	Mount Lemmon	Mount Lemmon Survey	PAD	1.7 km	MPC · JPL
372571	2009 UH_{56}	—	October 23, 2009	Mount Lemmon	Mount Lemmon Survey	KOR	1.4 km	MPC · JPL
372572	2009 UK_{57}	—	October 23, 2009	Mount Lemmon	Mount Lemmon Survey	·	1.1 km	MPC · JPL
372573 Pietromenga	2009 UW_{59}	Pietromenga	October 24, 2009	Magasa	Tonincelli, M., Zanardini, F.	HNS	1.5 km	MPC · JPL
372574	2009 UR_{72}	—	October 23, 2009	Mount Lemmon	Mount Lemmon Survey	·	1.9 km	MPC · JPL
372575	2009 UC_{77}	—	October 21, 2009	Mount Lemmon	Mount Lemmon Survey	·	1.6 km	MPC · JPL
372576	2009 UG_{82}	—	October 22, 2009	Mount Lemmon	Mount Lemmon Survey	·	1.9 km	MPC · JPL
372577	2009 UP_{91}	—	October 18, 2009	Catalina	CSS	(5)	1.4 km	MPC · JPL
372578 Khromov	2009 UB_{92}	Khromov	October 24, 2009	Zelenchukskaya Stn	T. V. Krjačko	·	2.6 km	MPC · JPL
372579	2009 UB_{95}	—	January 5, 2002	Kitt Peak	Spacewatch	·	1.5 km	MPC · JPL
372580	2009 UJ_{96}	—	December 27, 2005	Kitt Peak	Spacewatch	·	1.1 km	MPC · JPL
372581	2009 UX_{98}	—	September 17, 2004	Kitt Peak	Spacewatch	·	1.8 km	MPC · JPL
372582	2009 UZ_{98}	—	March 29, 2007	Kitt Peak	Spacewatch	·	1.8 km	MPC · JPL
372583	2009 UT_{99}	—	October 23, 2009	Mount Lemmon	Mount Lemmon Survey	·	1.4 km	MPC · JPL
372584	2009 UX_{99}	—	October 23, 2009	Mount Lemmon	Mount Lemmon Survey	·	3.2 km	MPC · JPL
372585	2009 UW_{101}	—	October 23, 2009	Mount Lemmon	Mount Lemmon Survey	·	3.3 km	MPC · JPL
372586	2009 UE_{104}	—	October 25, 2009	Mount Lemmon	Mount Lemmon Survey	·	2.1 km	MPC · JPL
372587	2009 UD_{109}	—	October 23, 2009	Mount Lemmon	Mount Lemmon Survey	·	1.7 km	MPC · JPL
372588	2009 UA_{112}	—	October 24, 2009	Kitt Peak	Spacewatch	·	1.6 km	MPC · JPL
372589	2009 UN_{121}	—	October 25, 2009	Kitt Peak	Spacewatch	NEM	2.0 km	MPC · JPL
372590	2009 UV_{124}	—	March 16, 2002	Kitt Peak	Spacewatch	·	1.7 km	MPC · JPL
372591	2009 UP_{126}	—	October 27, 2009	Catalina	CSS	·	1.4 km	MPC · JPL
372592	2009 UD_{138}	—	October 26, 2009	Kitt Peak	Spacewatch	·	2.3 km	MPC · JPL
372593	2009 UH_{138}	—	October 16, 2009	Catalina	CSS	·	1.2 km	MPC · JPL
372594	2009 UJ_{139}	—	October 27, 2009	Mount Lemmon	Mount Lemmon Survey	EUN	1.6 km	MPC · JPL
372595	2009 UW_{139}	—	October 27, 2009	La Sagra	OAM	ADE	3.1 km	MPC · JPL
372596	2009 UP_{141}	—	October 23, 2009	Mount Lemmon	Mount Lemmon Survey	·	1.8 km	MPC · JPL
372597	2009 UN_{145}	—	October 18, 2009	La Sagra	OAM	·	2.6 km	MPC · JPL
372598	2009 UB_{148}	—	October 18, 2009	Mount Lemmon	Mount Lemmon Survey	HOF	2.5 km	MPC · JPL
372599	2009 UW_{149}	—	October 26, 2009	Mount Lemmon	Mount Lemmon Survey	·	2.0 km	MPC · JPL
372600	2009 UN_{150}	—	October 18, 2009	Mount Lemmon	Mount Lemmon Survey	KOR	1.4 km	MPC · JPL

== 372601–372700 ==
back to top

Designation			Discovery			Properties		Ref
Permanent	Provisional	Named after	Date	Site	Discoverer(s)	Category	Diam.	Ref
372601	2009 VH_{1}	—	November 9, 2009	Mayhill	Mayhill	MAR	1.5 km	MPC · JPL
372602	2009 VX_{1}	—	October 29, 2009	Catalina	CSS	·	1.5 km	MPC · JPL
372603	2009 VD_{3}	—	November 10, 2009	Mayhill	Mayhill	EUN	1.9 km	MPC · JPL
372604	2009 VD_{5}	—	November 8, 2009	Kitt Peak	Spacewatch	·	2.3 km	MPC · JPL
372605	2009 VH_{5}	—	November 8, 2009	Kitt Peak	Spacewatch	WIT	1.3 km	MPC · JPL
372606	2009 VU_{7}	—	November 8, 2009	Catalina	CSS	·	2.9 km	MPC · JPL
372607	2009 VJ_{9}	—	November 8, 2009	Mount Lemmon	Mount Lemmon Survey	AGN	1.2 km	MPC · JPL
372608	2009 VW_{10}	—	November 8, 2009	Mount Lemmon	Mount Lemmon Survey	AGN	1.8 km	MPC · JPL
372609	2009 VP_{17}	—	November 8, 2009	Mount Lemmon	Mount Lemmon Survey	·	1.4 km	MPC · JPL
372610	2009 VP_{18}	—	October 24, 2009	Kitt Peak	Spacewatch	·	1.9 km	MPC · JPL
372611	2009 VZ_{18}	—	November 9, 2009	Kitt Peak	Spacewatch	·	1.6 km	MPC · JPL
372612	2009 VB_{19}	—	November 9, 2009	Kitt Peak	Spacewatch	AGN	1.2 km	MPC · JPL
372613	2009 VZ_{23}	—	November 9, 2009	Mount Lemmon	Mount Lemmon Survey	·	1.7 km	MPC · JPL
372614	2009 VA_{29}	—	November 9, 2009	Kitt Peak	Spacewatch	(5)	1.2 km	MPC · JPL
372615	2009 VA_{34}	—	November 10, 2009	Mount Lemmon	Mount Lemmon Survey	AGN	1.3 km	MPC · JPL
372616	2009 VE_{37}	—	September 19, 2009	Mount Lemmon	Mount Lemmon Survey	·	1.4 km	MPC · JPL
372617	2009 VW_{37}	—	November 8, 2009	Mount Lemmon	Mount Lemmon Survey	·	1.7 km	MPC · JPL
372618	2009 VG_{38}	—	November 8, 2009	Mount Lemmon	Mount Lemmon Survey	·	2.1 km	MPC · JPL
372619	2009 VM_{39}	—	November 10, 2009	Mount Lemmon	Mount Lemmon Survey	·	2.5 km	MPC · JPL
372620	2009 VK_{40}	—	November 8, 2009	Catalina	CSS	·	2.8 km	MPC · JPL
372621	2009 VG_{41}	—	April 15, 2007	Mount Lemmon	Mount Lemmon Survey	·	1.8 km	MPC · JPL
372622	2009 VX_{42}	—	November 9, 2009	Kitt Peak	Spacewatch	·	2.4 km	MPC · JPL
372623	2009 VM_{48}	—	January 9, 2006	Kitt Peak	Spacewatch	AGN	950 m	MPC · JPL
372624	2009 VT_{49}	—	February 2, 2006	Catalina	CSS	·	2.7 km	MPC · JPL
372625	2009 VK_{50}	—	November 12, 2009	La Sagra	OAM	LEO	2.0 km	MPC · JPL
372626 IGEM	2009 VQ_{57}	IGEM	November 12, 2009	Zelenchukskaya Stn	T. V. Krjačko	·	1.0 km	MPC · JPL
372627	2009 VB_{59}	—	November 8, 2009	Catalina	CSS	ADE	2.5 km	MPC · JPL
372628	2009 VX_{59}	—	November 9, 2009	Catalina	CSS	·	1.8 km	MPC · JPL
372629	2009 VC_{62}	—	November 8, 2009	Mount Lemmon	Mount Lemmon Survey	·	1.6 km	MPC · JPL
372630	2009 VU_{68}	—	September 24, 2000	Kitt Peak	Spacewatch	MIS	2.3 km	MPC · JPL
372631	2009 VJ_{71}	—	November 9, 2009	Mount Lemmon	Mount Lemmon Survey	·	2.2 km	MPC · JPL
372632	2009 VU_{72}	—	October 18, 2009	Catalina	CSS	·	2.4 km	MPC · JPL
372633	2009 VS_{79}	—	November 10, 2009	Catalina	CSS	·	1.4 km	MPC · JPL
372634	2009 VV_{79}	—	November 10, 2009	Catalina	CSS	·	1.8 km	MPC · JPL
372635	2009 VT_{81}	—	March 13, 2007	Mount Lemmon	Mount Lemmon Survey	·	2.3 km	MPC · JPL
372636	2009 VD_{89}	—	November 11, 2009	Kitt Peak	Spacewatch	·	2.1 km	MPC · JPL
372637	2009 VU_{94}	—	November 9, 2009	Kitt Peak	Spacewatch	·	2.1 km	MPC · JPL
372638	2009 VR_{101}	—	September 17, 2004	Kitt Peak	Spacewatch	·	2.3 km	MPC · JPL
372639	2009 VS_{104}	—	November 8, 2009	Catalina	CSS	·	2.2 km	MPC · JPL
372640	2009 VL_{108}	—	November 8, 2009	Catalina	CSS	·	2.6 km	MPC · JPL
372641	2009 WD_{10}	—	November 19, 2009	Socorro	LINEAR	·	1.5 km	MPC · JPL
372642	2009 WM_{18}	—	November 17, 2009	Mount Lemmon	Mount Lemmon Survey	KOR	1.3 km	MPC · JPL
372643	2009 WU_{20}	—	November 17, 2009	Catalina	CSS	HOF	3.1 km	MPC · JPL
372644	2009 WA_{24}	—	November 17, 2009	Socorro	LINEAR	·	3.4 km	MPC · JPL
372645	2009 WB_{24}	—	November 18, 2009	Socorro	LINEAR	·	3.5 km	MPC · JPL
372646	2009 WM_{26}	—	November 22, 2009	Sandlot	G. Hug	EOS	3.7 km	MPC · JPL
372647	2009 WH_{27}	—	November 16, 2009	Kitt Peak	Spacewatch	KOR	1.7 km	MPC · JPL
372648	2009 WU_{28}	—	November 16, 2009	Kitt Peak	Spacewatch	PAD	2.9 km	MPC · JPL
372649	2009 WZ_{30}	—	November 30, 2005	Kitt Peak	Spacewatch	·	1.8 km	MPC · JPL
372650	2009 WE_{32}	—	November 16, 2009	Kitt Peak	Spacewatch	·	2.0 km	MPC · JPL
372651	2009 WV_{37}	—	November 17, 2009	Kitt Peak	Spacewatch	·	2.6 km	MPC · JPL
372652	2009 WF_{38}	—	November 8, 2009	Mount Lemmon	Mount Lemmon Survey	·	2.4 km	MPC · JPL
372653	2009 WB_{42}	—	November 17, 2009	Kitt Peak	Spacewatch	·	1.9 km	MPC · JPL
372654	2009 WQ_{45}	—	November 18, 2009	Kitt Peak	Spacewatch	MRX	1.3 km	MPC · JPL
372655	2009 WU_{51}	—	November 22, 2009	Mount Lemmon	Mount Lemmon Survey	EUP	4.6 km	MPC · JPL
372656	2009 WE_{52}	—	November 16, 2009	Auberry	Auberry	·	1.8 km	MPC · JPL
372657	2009 WS_{53}	—	November 16, 2009	Socorro	LINEAR	TEL	1.7 km	MPC · JPL
372658	2009 WR_{55}	—	November 16, 2009	Kitt Peak	Spacewatch	·	1.4 km	MPC · JPL
372659	2009 WL_{70}	—	October 25, 2009	Kitt Peak	Spacewatch	·	2.0 km	MPC · JPL
372660	2009 WJ_{72}	—	November 18, 2009	Kitt Peak	Spacewatch	·	1.3 km	MPC · JPL
372661	2009 WD_{74}	—	November 18, 2009	Kitt Peak	Spacewatch	·	4.8 km	MPC · JPL
372662	2009 WS_{74}	—	November 18, 2009	Kitt Peak	Spacewatch	·	1.9 km	MPC · JPL
372663	2009 WN_{79}	—	November 18, 2009	Kitt Peak	Spacewatch	·	2.0 km	MPC · JPL
372664	2009 WU_{79}	—	November 18, 2009	Kitt Peak	Spacewatch	EOS	2.6 km	MPC · JPL
372665	2009 WY_{82}	—	November 11, 2009	Kitt Peak	Spacewatch	·	2.4 km	MPC · JPL
372666	2009 WD_{89}	—	September 18, 2009	Mount Lemmon	Mount Lemmon Survey	·	2.1 km	MPC · JPL
372667	2009 WU_{90}	—	November 19, 2009	Kitt Peak	Spacewatch	·	2.1 km	MPC · JPL
372668	2009 WW_{95}	—	December 7, 2005	Kitt Peak	Spacewatch	·	1.3 km	MPC · JPL
372669	2009 WW_{97}	—	January 23, 2006	Kitt Peak	Spacewatch	·	2.4 km	MPC · JPL
372670	2009 WF_{98}	—	November 21, 2009	Kitt Peak	Spacewatch	·	1.6 km	MPC · JPL
372671	2009 WP_{109}	—	November 17, 2009	Mount Lemmon	Mount Lemmon Survey	·	2.1 km	MPC · JPL
372672	2009 WX_{111}	—	October 12, 2009	Mount Lemmon	Mount Lemmon Survey	·	2.2 km	MPC · JPL
372673	2009 WS_{116}	—	October 27, 2009	Kitt Peak	Spacewatch	·	1.8 km	MPC · JPL
372674	2009 WY_{118}	—	November 20, 2009	Kitt Peak	Spacewatch	·	1.9 km	MPC · JPL
372675	2009 WS_{122}	—	November 20, 2009	Kitt Peak	Spacewatch	KOR	1.3 km	MPC · JPL
372676	2009 WH_{124}	—	November 20, 2009	Kitt Peak	Spacewatch	·	2.1 km	MPC · JPL
372677	2009 WR_{127}	—	November 20, 2009	Kitt Peak	Spacewatch	·	2.0 km	MPC · JPL
372678	2009 WR_{133}	—	September 7, 2004	Kitt Peak	Spacewatch	·	1.4 km	MPC · JPL
372679	2009 WW_{134}	—	November 22, 2009	Mount Lemmon	Mount Lemmon Survey	·	1.7 km	MPC · JPL
372680	2009 WT_{139}	—	September 15, 2009	Kitt Peak	Spacewatch	·	1.6 km	MPC · JPL
372681	2009 WD_{145}	—	November 19, 2009	Mount Lemmon	Mount Lemmon Survey	AGN	1.1 km	MPC · JPL
372682	2009 WK_{155}	—	November 19, 2009	La Sagra	OAM	·	2.8 km	MPC · JPL
372683	2009 WT_{161}	—	November 10, 2009	Kitt Peak	Spacewatch	EUP	5.2 km	MPC · JPL
372684	2009 WW_{165}	—	November 21, 2009	Kitt Peak	Spacewatch	KOR	1.3 km	MPC · JPL
372685	2009 WT_{167}	—	November 22, 2009	Kitt Peak	Spacewatch	HOF	2.7 km	MPC · JPL
372686	2009 WL_{171}	—	November 22, 2009	Mount Lemmon	Mount Lemmon Survey	·	1.8 km	MPC · JPL
372687	2009 WN_{175}	—	November 23, 2009	Kitt Peak	Spacewatch	·	2.2 km	MPC · JPL
372688	2009 WU_{176}	—	November 23, 2009	Kitt Peak	Spacewatch	·	3.1 km	MPC · JPL
372689	2009 WB_{177}	—	November 2, 2000	Kitt Peak	Spacewatch	·	1.9 km	MPC · JPL
372690	2009 WX_{186}	—	November 9, 2009	Kitt Peak	Spacewatch	·	1.7 km	MPC · JPL
372691	2009 WT_{188}	—	November 24, 2009	Mount Lemmon	Mount Lemmon Survey	·	1.9 km	MPC · JPL
372692	2009 WC_{195}	—	November 24, 2009	La Sagra	OAM	·	2.1 km	MPC · JPL
372693	2009 WL_{197}	—	November 25, 2009	Mount Lemmon	Mount Lemmon Survey	·	3.6 km	MPC · JPL
372694	2009 WL_{206}	—	April 18, 2007	Mount Lemmon	Mount Lemmon Survey	AGN	1.2 km	MPC · JPL
372695	2009 WR_{207}	—	November 17, 2009	Kitt Peak	Spacewatch	KOR	1.3 km	MPC · JPL
372696	2009 WM_{209}	—	November 17, 2009	Kitt Peak	Spacewatch	HOF	3.1 km	MPC · JPL
372697	2009 WH_{211}	—	November 18, 2009	Kitt Peak	Spacewatch	·	1.8 km	MPC · JPL
372698	2009 WZ_{224}	—	November 16, 2009	Kitt Peak	Spacewatch	EOS ·	3.6 km	MPC · JPL
372699	2009 WJ_{226}	—	September 22, 1995	Kitt Peak	Spacewatch	·	2.0 km	MPC · JPL
372700	2009 WQ_{230}	—	October 7, 2004	Kitt Peak	Spacewatch	AGN	1.5 km	MPC · JPL

== 372701–372800 ==
back to top

Designation			Discovery			Properties		Ref
Permanent	Provisional	Named after	Date	Site	Discoverer(s)	Category	Diam.	Ref
372701	2009 WV_{230}	—	November 17, 2009	Mount Lemmon	Mount Lemmon Survey	·	2.2 km	MPC · JPL
372702	2009 WJ_{237}	—	November 17, 2009	Kitt Peak	Spacewatch	·	2.5 km	MPC · JPL
372703	2009 WE_{248}	—	September 20, 2009	Mount Lemmon	Mount Lemmon Survey	MRX	1.1 km	MPC · JPL
372704	2009 WL_{249}	—	November 25, 2009	Kitt Peak	Spacewatch	·	2.7 km	MPC · JPL
372705	2009 WX_{249}	—	November 19, 2009	Kitt Peak	Spacewatch	KOR	1.5 km	MPC · JPL
372706	2009 WT_{250}	—	November 24, 2009	La Sagra	OAM	·	4.2 km	MPC · JPL
372707	2009 WM_{256}	—	November 24, 2009	Kitt Peak	Spacewatch	AST	1.8 km	MPC · JPL
372708	2009 WY_{258}	—	October 21, 2008	Mount Lemmon	Mount Lemmon Survey	·	3.9 km	MPC · JPL
372709	2009 WZ_{259}	—	November 17, 2009	Kitt Peak	Spacewatch	·	3.0 km	MPC · JPL
372710	2009 WF_{260}	—	November 21, 2009	Mount Lemmon	Mount Lemmon Survey	·	4.1 km	MPC · JPL
372711	2009 WQ_{260}	—	November 20, 2009	Kitt Peak	Spacewatch	KOR	1.4 km	MPC · JPL
372712	2009 XG_{2}	—	December 11, 2009	Mayhill	Mayhill	·	5.4 km	MPC · JPL
372713	2009 XJ_{7}	—	December 10, 2009	Socorro	LINEAR	·	3.2 km	MPC · JPL
372714	2009 XT_{10}	—	December 10, 2009	Mount Lemmon	Mount Lemmon Survey	·	5.6 km	MPC · JPL
372715	2009 XR_{11}	—	December 11, 2009	Mount Lemmon	Mount Lemmon Survey	·	2.8 km	MPC · JPL
372716	2009 XS_{12}	—	December 11, 2009	Catalina	CSS	·	2.4 km	MPC · JPL
372717	2009 XX_{16}	—	December 15, 2009	Mount Lemmon	Mount Lemmon Survey	·	3.6 km	MPC · JPL
372718	2009 XD_{19}	—	December 15, 2009	Mount Lemmon	Mount Lemmon Survey	·	3.0 km	MPC · JPL
372719	2009 XK_{19}	—	December 15, 2009	Mount Lemmon	Mount Lemmon Survey	·	2.1 km	MPC · JPL
372720	2009 XU_{20}	—	December 15, 2009	Bergisch Gladbach	W. Bickel	·	3.5 km	MPC · JPL
372721	2009 XD_{21}	—	September 3, 2004	Siding Spring	SSS	·	2.8 km	MPC · JPL
372722	2009 XN_{21}	—	December 10, 2009	Mount Lemmon	Mount Lemmon Survey	·	4.1 km	MPC · JPL
372723	2009 XY_{22}	—	December 15, 2009	Mount Lemmon	Mount Lemmon Survey	·	2.9 km	MPC · JPL
372724	2009 YA_{4}	—	December 17, 2009	Mount Lemmon	Mount Lemmon Survey	EOS	2.1 km	MPC · JPL
372725	2009 YJ_{4}	—	December 17, 2009	Mount Lemmon	Mount Lemmon Survey	·	2.8 km	MPC · JPL
372726	2009 YL_{4}	—	December 17, 2009	Mount Lemmon	Mount Lemmon Survey	·	4.8 km	MPC · JPL
372727	2009 YH_{6}	—	November 25, 2009	Mount Lemmon	Mount Lemmon Survey	·	2.3 km	MPC · JPL
372728	2009 YV_{9}	—	December 17, 2009	Mount Lemmon	Mount Lemmon Survey	EOS	1.9 km	MPC · JPL
372729	2009 YO_{11}	—	December 18, 2009	Mount Lemmon	Mount Lemmon Survey	·	2.8 km	MPC · JPL
372730	2009 YM_{17}	—	December 10, 2009	Mount Lemmon	Mount Lemmon Survey	·	3.8 km	MPC · JPL
372731	2009 YX_{19}	—	December 25, 2009	Kitt Peak	Spacewatch	·	2.8 km	MPC · JPL
372732	2009 YD_{20}	—	December 26, 2009	Kitt Peak	Spacewatch	·	2.6 km	MPC · JPL
372733	2009 YP_{20}	—	December 27, 2009	Kitt Peak	Spacewatch	·	3.5 km	MPC · JPL
372734	2009 YE_{21}	—	December 27, 2009	Kitt Peak	Spacewatch	·	4.6 km	MPC · JPL
372735	2010 AG_{17}	—	September 5, 2008	Kitt Peak	Spacewatch	·	2.8 km	MPC · JPL
372736	2010 AD_{23}	—	January 6, 2010	Kitt Peak	Spacewatch	·	2.7 km	MPC · JPL
372737	2010 AR_{25}	—	January 6, 2010	Kitt Peak	Spacewatch	·	4.4 km	MPC · JPL
372738	2010 AT_{47}	—	January 8, 2010	Kitt Peak	Spacewatch	·	3.7 km	MPC · JPL
372739	2010 AV_{48}	—	January 8, 2010	Kitt Peak	Spacewatch	·	2.9 km	MPC · JPL
372740	2010 AH_{49}	—	January 8, 2010	Kitt Peak	Spacewatch	·	3.5 km	MPC · JPL
372741	2010 AP_{49}	—	January 8, 2010	Kitt Peak	Spacewatch	ELF	4.8 km	MPC · JPL
372742	2010 AF_{55}	—	January 8, 2010	Kitt Peak	Spacewatch	EOS	2.1 km	MPC · JPL
372743	2010 AG_{60}	—	October 10, 2008	Mount Lemmon	Mount Lemmon Survey	·	4.5 km	MPC · JPL
372744	2010 AQ_{61}	—	January 15, 2010	Mayhill	Mayhill	·	3.7 km	MPC · JPL
372745	2010 AH_{64}	—	January 10, 2010	Kitt Peak	Spacewatch	·	3.6 km	MPC · JPL
372746	2010 AJ_{67}	—	January 12, 2010	Kitt Peak	Spacewatch	·	4.2 km	MPC · JPL
372747	2010 AT_{67}	—	November 4, 1991	Kitt Peak	Spacewatch	·	1.5 km	MPC · JPL
372748	2010 AV_{69}	—	January 12, 2010	Mount Lemmon	Mount Lemmon Survey	·	2.8 km	MPC · JPL
372749	2010 AG_{80}	—	January 13, 2010	Mount Lemmon	Mount Lemmon Survey	·	4.1 km	MPC · JPL
372750	2010 BT	—	January 17, 2010	Bisei SG Center	BATTeRS	·	3.0 km	MPC · JPL
372751	2010 BZ_{2}	—	January 19, 2010	Črni Vrh	J. Zakrajšek, B. Mikuž	·	2.2 km	MPC · JPL
372752	2010 BV_{14}	—	May 5, 2000	Kitt Peak	Spacewatch	·	2.8 km	MPC · JPL
372753	2010 CY_{1}	—	February 5, 2010	Catalina	CSS	·	3.4 km	MPC · JPL
372754	2010 CJ_{2}	—	February 5, 2010	Kitt Peak	Spacewatch	VER	3.1 km	MPC · JPL
372755	2010 CC_{13}	—	February 9, 2010	WISE	WISE	·	2.2 km	MPC · JPL
372756	2010 CR_{15}	—	September 20, 2009	Catalina	CSS	·	3.5 km	MPC · JPL
372757	2010 CT_{21}	—	February 9, 2010	Mount Lemmon	Mount Lemmon Survey	THM	2.4 km	MPC · JPL
372758	2010 CD_{27}	—	February 9, 2010	Mount Lemmon	Mount Lemmon Survey	·	4.2 km	MPC · JPL
372759	2010 CH_{28}	—	February 9, 2010	Catalina	CSS	·	1.6 km	MPC · JPL
372760	2010 CJ_{29}	—	February 9, 2010	Kitt Peak	Spacewatch	CYB	5.4 km	MPC · JPL
372761	2010 CV_{69}	—	February 13, 2010	Mount Lemmon	Mount Lemmon Survey	·	5.1 km	MPC · JPL
372762	2010 CQ_{70}	—	February 13, 2010	Mount Lemmon	Mount Lemmon Survey	·	3.9 km	MPC · JPL
372763	2010 CP_{92}	—	January 15, 2004	Kitt Peak	Spacewatch	·	2.8 km	MPC · JPL
372764	2010 CW_{107}	—	February 14, 2010	Catalina	CSS	·	3.5 km	MPC · JPL
372765	2010 CV_{120}	—	February 15, 2010	Catalina	CSS	·	4.3 km	MPC · JPL
372766	2010 CD_{138}	—	October 20, 2008	Mount Lemmon	Mount Lemmon Survey	THM	2.7 km	MPC · JPL
372767	2010 CB_{141}	—	February 15, 2010	Socorro	LINEAR	·	3.8 km	MPC · JPL
372768	2010 CR_{142}	—	December 19, 2003	Kitt Peak	Spacewatch	·	3.7 km	MPC · JPL
372769	2010 CY_{159}	—	February 15, 2010	Kitt Peak	Spacewatch	·	5.0 km	MPC · JPL
372770	2010 CF_{160}	—	February 9, 2010	Catalina	CSS	·	5.3 km	MPC · JPL
372771	2010 CM_{160}	—	February 13, 2010	Catalina	CSS	·	4.0 km	MPC · JPL
372772	2010 CY_{169}	—	February 10, 2010	Kitt Peak	Spacewatch	·	5.1 km	MPC · JPL
372773	2010 DG_{6}	—	February 16, 2010	Kitt Peak	Spacewatch	·	2.5 km	MPC · JPL
372774	2010 DO_{20}	—	February 18, 2010	Siding Spring	SSS	BAR	1.6 km	MPC · JPL
372775	2010 DR_{35}	—	October 10, 2008	Mount Lemmon	Mount Lemmon Survey	·	2.5 km	MPC · JPL
372776	2010 DH_{43}	—	February 17, 2010	Kitt Peak	Spacewatch	·	3.8 km	MPC · JPL
372777	2010 DN_{44}	—	February 17, 2010	Kitt Peak	Spacewatch	·	3.3 km	MPC · JPL
372778	2010 DS_{60}	—	January 10, 2006	Kitt Peak	Spacewatch	·	2.5 km	MPC · JPL
372779	2010 EX_{140}	—	March 17, 2005	Kitt Peak	Spacewatch	·	1.9 km	MPC · JPL
372780	2010 FP_{6}	—	March 16, 2010	Dauban	Kugel, F.	·	4.7 km	MPC · JPL
372781	2010 FC_{34}	—	October 15, 2009	Mount Lemmon	Mount Lemmon Survey	·	5.5 km	MPC · JPL
372782	2010 FQ_{43}	—	March 21, 2010	WISE	WISE	(13314)	3.6 km	MPC · JPL
372783	2010 GC_{41}	—	April 7, 2010	WISE	WISE	·	5.1 km	MPC · JPL
372784	2010 GS_{173}	—	April 6, 2005	Mount Lemmon	Mount Lemmon Survey	·	3.8 km	MPC · JPL
372785	2010 JL_{34}	—	May 7, 2010	Nogales	Tenagra II	H	690 m	MPC · JPL
372786	2010 NA_{114}	—	December 4, 2007	Mount Lemmon	Mount Lemmon Survey	·	1.4 km	MPC · JPL
372787	2010 OK_{61}	—	November 12, 2007	Mount Lemmon	Mount Lemmon Survey	·	1.5 km	MPC · JPL
372788	2010 OR_{125}	—	February 13, 2008	Mount Lemmon	Mount Lemmon Survey	ERI	1.8 km	MPC · JPL
372789	2010 PK_{26}	—	January 30, 2006	Kitt Peak	Spacewatch	·	1.4 km	MPC · JPL
372790	2010 PQ_{26}	—	November 11, 2007	Mount Lemmon	Mount Lemmon Survey	·	870 m	MPC · JPL
372791	2010 RT_{51}	—	April 19, 2006	Mount Lemmon	Mount Lemmon Survey	·	510 m	MPC · JPL
372792	2010 RR_{60}	—	February 1, 2005	Kitt Peak	Spacewatch	·	750 m	MPC · JPL
372793	2010 RA_{62}	—	September 6, 2010	Kitt Peak	Spacewatch	·	700 m	MPC · JPL
372794	2010 RG_{107}	—	April 19, 2006	Mount Lemmon	Mount Lemmon Survey	·	590 m	MPC · JPL
372795	2010 RS_{107}	—	September 10, 2010	Kitt Peak	Spacewatch	·	670 m	MPC · JPL
372796	2010 RT_{113}	—	September 11, 2010	Kitt Peak	Spacewatch	·	540 m	MPC · JPL
372797	2010 RW_{141}	—	November 8, 2007	Kitt Peak	Spacewatch	·	750 m	MPC · JPL
372798	2010 RH_{154}	—	September 15, 2010	Kitt Peak	Spacewatch	·	740 m	MPC · JPL
372799	2010 RO_{173}	—	November 20, 2000	Socorro	LINEAR	·	890 m	MPC · JPL
372800	2010 ST_{8}	—	September 17, 2010	Kitt Peak	Spacewatch	·	600 m	MPC · JPL

== 372801–372900 ==
back to top

Designation			Discovery			Properties		Ref
Permanent	Provisional	Named after	Date	Site	Discoverer(s)	Category	Diam.	Ref
372801	2010 SY_{8}	—	September 1, 2010	Mount Lemmon	Mount Lemmon Survey	·	660 m	MPC · JPL
372802	2010 SA_{19}	—	May 11, 2002	Socorro	LINEAR	V	820 m	MPC · JPL
372803	2010 ST_{28}	—	December 15, 2007	Kitt Peak	Spacewatch	·	630 m	MPC · JPL
372804	2010 SH_{41}	—	April 2, 2005	Kitt Peak	Spacewatch	·	1.4 km	MPC · JPL
372805	2010 TE_{7}	—	September 15, 2007	Mount Lemmon	Mount Lemmon Survey	·	930 m	MPC · JPL
372806	2010 TB_{38}	—	October 28, 1994	Kitt Peak	Spacewatch	·	590 m	MPC · JPL
372807	2010 TP_{40}	—	April 1, 2009	Mount Lemmon	Mount Lemmon Survey	·	640 m	MPC · JPL
372808	2010 TP_{43}	—	October 31, 2007	Kitt Peak	Spacewatch	·	570 m	MPC · JPL
372809	2010 TW_{56}	—	October 3, 2010	Kitt Peak	Spacewatch	·	750 m	MPC · JPL
372810	2010 TO_{64}	—	September 16, 2010	Kitt Peak	Spacewatch	·	530 m	MPC · JPL
372811	2010 TS_{85}	—	October 30, 2000	Kitt Peak	Spacewatch	·	590 m	MPC · JPL
372812	2010 TA_{113}	—	September 22, 2003	Kitt Peak	Spacewatch	·	830 m	MPC · JPL
372813	2010 TX_{116}	—	October 9, 1994	Kitt Peak	Spacewatch	·	930 m	MPC · JPL
372814	2010 TW_{124}	—	September 11, 2010	Kitt Peak	Spacewatch	·	670 m	MPC · JPL
372815	2010 TL_{138}	—	September 16, 2010	Mount Lemmon	Mount Lemmon Survey	·	770 m	MPC · JPL
372816	2010 TG_{151}	—	October 9, 2010	Catalina	CSS	·	2.6 km	MPC · JPL
372817	2010 TQ_{161}	—	October 7, 2010	Kitt Peak	Spacewatch	·	520 m	MPC · JPL
372818	2010 US_{13}	—	October 17, 2010	Mount Lemmon	Mount Lemmon Survey	·	770 m	MPC · JPL
372819	2010 UF_{16}	—	March 9, 2005	Mount Lemmon	Mount Lemmon Survey	·	620 m	MPC · JPL
372820	2010 UT_{16}	—	October 27, 2003	Kitt Peak	Spacewatch	·	770 m	MPC · JPL
372821	2010 UE_{25}	—	November 27, 2000	Kitt Peak	Spacewatch	·	720 m	MPC · JPL
372822	2010 UF_{26}	—	December 17, 2007	Mount Lemmon	Mount Lemmon Survey	·	720 m	MPC · JPL
372823	2010 UZ_{32}	—	December 19, 2007	Mount Lemmon	Mount Lemmon Survey	·	900 m	MPC · JPL
372824	2010 UB_{35}	—	December 30, 2007	Kitt Peak	Spacewatch	·	900 m	MPC · JPL
372825	2010 UG_{41}	—	October 30, 2010	Kitt Peak	Spacewatch	·	980 m	MPC · JPL
372826	2010 UU_{45}	—	September 16, 2010	Mount Lemmon	Mount Lemmon Survey	·	790 m	MPC · JPL
372827	2010 UH_{54}	—	October 29, 2010	Kitt Peak	Spacewatch	·	830 m	MPC · JPL
372828	2010 UJ_{57}	—	November 11, 2007	Mount Lemmon	Mount Lemmon Survey	·	720 m	MPC · JPL
372829	2010 UQ_{57}	—	February 7, 2008	Kitt Peak	Spacewatch	·	1.1 km	MPC · JPL
372830	2010 UL_{60}	—	October 21, 2003	Socorro	LINEAR	·	570 m	MPC · JPL
372831	2010 UR_{64}	—	May 29, 2009	Siding Spring	SSS	V	700 m	MPC · JPL
372832	2010 UJ_{70}	—	October 19, 2010	Mount Lemmon	Mount Lemmon Survey	·	760 m	MPC · JPL
372833	2010 UE_{73}	—	October 20, 2003	Socorro	LINEAR	·	850 m	MPC · JPL
372834	2010 UU_{76}	—	October 19, 2006	Catalina	CSS	V	790 m	MPC · JPL
372835	2010 UA_{80}	—	December 19, 2007	Mount Lemmon	Mount Lemmon Survey	·	740 m	MPC · JPL
372836	2010 VT_{14}	—	September 20, 2003	Anderson Mesa	LONEOS	·	750 m	MPC · JPL
372837	2010 VQ_{22}	—	November 1, 2010	Kitt Peak	Spacewatch	·	1.6 km	MPC · JPL
372838	2010 VG_{32}	—	December 19, 2004	Mount Lemmon	Mount Lemmon Survey	·	750 m	MPC · JPL
372839	2010 VH_{47}	—	October 17, 2006	Kitt Peak	Spacewatch	·	1.1 km	MPC · JPL
372840	2010 VA_{61}	—	August 24, 2000	Socorro	LINEAR	·	830 m	MPC · JPL
372841	2010 VZ_{61}	—	September 29, 2003	Kitt Peak	Spacewatch	V	580 m	MPC · JPL
372842	2010 VE_{86}	—	November 16, 1995	Kitt Peak	Spacewatch	·	1.1 km	MPC · JPL
372843	2010 VM_{91}	—	January 15, 2008	Mount Lemmon	Mount Lemmon Survey	·	720 m	MPC · JPL
372844	2010 VZ_{91}	—	September 15, 2006	Kitt Peak	Spacewatch	·	1.4 km	MPC · JPL
372845	2010 VK_{92}	—	March 24, 2006	Mount Lemmon	Mount Lemmon Survey	·	670 m	MPC · JPL
372846	2010 VN_{99}	—	September 24, 2000	Socorro	LINEAR	·	610 m	MPC · JPL
372847	2010 VK_{101}	—	March 8, 2008	Mount Lemmon	Mount Lemmon Survey	MAS	680 m	MPC · JPL
372848	2010 VR_{112}	—	January 12, 2008	Kitt Peak	Spacewatch	·	660 m	MPC · JPL
372849	2010 VN_{128}	—	October 1, 2003	Kitt Peak	Spacewatch	·	830 m	MPC · JPL
372850	2010 VA_{130}	—	September 24, 2000	Socorro	LINEAR	·	620 m	MPC · JPL
372851	2010 VW_{135}	—	September 18, 2006	Catalina	CSS	V	870 m	MPC · JPL
372852	2010 VN_{148}	—	November 13, 2007	Mount Lemmon	Mount Lemmon Survey	·	1.3 km	MPC · JPL
372853	2010 VK_{150}	—	August 16, 2006	Siding Spring	SSS	·	960 m	MPC · JPL
372854	2010 VZ_{159}	—	August 18, 2006	Kitt Peak	Spacewatch	·	900 m	MPC · JPL
372855	2010 VX_{160}	—	May 28, 2009	Siding Spring	SSS	·	940 m	MPC · JPL
372856	2010 VK_{162}	—	May 6, 2005	Mount Lemmon	Mount Lemmon Survey	·	740 m	MPC · JPL
372857	2010 VZ_{163}	—	December 4, 2007	Mount Lemmon	Mount Lemmon Survey	·	670 m	MPC · JPL
372858	2010 VB_{171}	—	April 7, 2006	Kitt Peak	Spacewatch	slow	1.2 km	MPC · JPL
372859	2010 VG_{173}	—	May 23, 2006	Mount Lemmon	Mount Lemmon Survey	·	770 m	MPC · JPL
372860	2010 VJ_{173}	—	January 18, 2008	Mount Lemmon	Mount Lemmon Survey	·	640 m	MPC · JPL
372861	2010 VE_{182}	—	November 5, 2010	Kitt Peak	Spacewatch	·	1.7 km	MPC · JPL
372862	2010 VX_{196}	—	December 14, 2003	Kitt Peak	Spacewatch	·	1.1 km	MPC · JPL
372863	2010 VB_{197}	—	September 16, 2003	Kitt Peak	Spacewatch	·	580 m	MPC · JPL
372864	2010 VR_{213}	—	October 1, 2003	Kitt Peak	Spacewatch	·	920 m	MPC · JPL
372865	2010 VG_{216}	—	November 11, 2007	Mount Lemmon	Mount Lemmon Survey	·	600 m	MPC · JPL
372866	2010 VP_{216}	—	August 27, 2006	Kitt Peak	Spacewatch	·	850 m	MPC · JPL
372867	2010 VO_{217}	—	November 18, 2003	Kitt Peak	Spacewatch	·	1.3 km	MPC · JPL
372868	2010 VA_{218}	—	February 9, 2005	Mount Lemmon	Mount Lemmon Survey	(883)	680 m	MPC · JPL
372869	2010 WG_{22}	—	October 2, 2006	Mount Lemmon	Mount Lemmon Survey	·	910 m	MPC · JPL
372870	2010 WZ_{27}	—	November 10, 2010	Kitt Peak	Spacewatch	·	1.7 km	MPC · JPL
372871	2010 WJ_{28}	—	December 18, 2003	Socorro	LINEAR	·	920 m	MPC · JPL
372872	2010 WA_{40}	—	November 1, 2000	Socorro	LINEAR	·	880 m	MPC · JPL
372873	2010 WZ_{43}	—	October 21, 2003	Kitt Peak	Spacewatch	·	1.0 km	MPC · JPL
372874	2010 WB_{52}	—	November 19, 2003	Kitt Peak	Spacewatch	·	690 m	MPC · JPL
372875	2010 WC_{52}	—	January 14, 2008	Kitt Peak	Spacewatch	·	650 m	MPC · JPL
372876	2010 WG_{60}	—	July 25, 2003	Socorro	LINEAR	·	1.1 km	MPC · JPL
372877	2010 WS_{61}	—	January 15, 2008	Mount Lemmon	Mount Lemmon Survey	·	680 m	MPC · JPL
372878	2010 XY_{2}	—	December 1, 2010	Mount Lemmon	Mount Lemmon Survey	·	2.9 km	MPC · JPL
372879	2010 XZ_{2}	—	September 16, 2006	Catalina	CSS	·	1.3 km	MPC · JPL
372880	2010 XO_{66}	—	January 17, 2007	Kitt Peak	Spacewatch	·	1.7 km	MPC · JPL
372881	2010 XF_{68}	—	February 2, 2008	Mount Lemmon	Mount Lemmon Survey	·	1.6 km	MPC · JPL
372882	2010 XT_{83}	—	October 23, 2006	Catalina	CSS	PHO	1.6 km	MPC · JPL
372883	2010 XZ_{83}	—	January 11, 2008	Mount Lemmon	Mount Lemmon Survey	·	910 m	MPC · JPL
372884	2010 XD_{84}	—	October 9, 1999	Kitt Peak	Spacewatch	·	790 m	MPC · JPL
372885	2010 XZ_{84}	—	January 13, 2008	Mount Lemmon	Mount Lemmon Survey	·	730 m	MPC · JPL
372886	2010 XL_{85}	—	September 17, 2003	Kitt Peak	Spacewatch	·	590 m	MPC · JPL
372887	2010 YM	—	October 13, 2006	Kitt Peak	Spacewatch	·	870 m	MPC · JPL
372888	2010 YC_{3}	—	February 28, 2000	Socorro	LINEAR	·	1.8 km	MPC · JPL
372889	2011 AC_{9}	—	December 14, 2010	Mount Lemmon	Mount Lemmon Survey	·	2.4 km	MPC · JPL
372890	2011 AD_{13}	—	March 4, 2006	Catalina	CSS	TIR	4.4 km	MPC · JPL
372891	2011 AS_{15}	—	September 18, 2009	Mount Lemmon	Mount Lemmon Survey	·	1.6 km	MPC · JPL
372892	2011 AO_{21}	—	October 24, 2005	Kitt Peak	Spacewatch	·	1.6 km	MPC · JPL
372893	2011 AP_{23}	—	December 27, 2006	Mount Lemmon	Mount Lemmon Survey	·	2.2 km	MPC · JPL
372894	2011 AD_{26}	—	July 21, 2006	Mount Lemmon	Mount Lemmon Survey	·	930 m	MPC · JPL
372895	2011 AE_{26}	—	January 10, 2007	Kitt Peak	Spacewatch	·	1.4 km	MPC · JPL
372896	2011 AL_{31}	—	March 9, 2003	Kitt Peak	Spacewatch	WIT	1.2 km	MPC · JPL
372897	2011 AJ_{32}	—	March 13, 2003	Kitt Peak	Spacewatch	·	1.3 km	MPC · JPL
372898	2011 AW_{33}	—	November 4, 2005	Kitt Peak	Spacewatch	·	2.0 km	MPC · JPL
372899	2011 AD_{34}	—	September 15, 2009	Mount Lemmon	Mount Lemmon Survey	·	1.9 km	MPC · JPL
372900	2011 AK_{38}	—	November 11, 2005	Kitt Peak	Spacewatch	·	1.8 km	MPC · JPL

== 372901–373000 ==
back to top

Designation			Discovery			Properties		Ref
Permanent	Provisional	Named after	Date	Site	Discoverer(s)	Category	Diam.	Ref
372901	2011 AC_{43}	—	January 10, 2011	Kitt Peak	Spacewatch	·	2.8 km	MPC · JPL
372902	2011 AR_{46}	—	October 26, 2005	Kitt Peak	Spacewatch	·	1.4 km	MPC · JPL
372903	2011 AB_{53}	—	February 11, 2010	WISE	WISE	·	3.0 km	MPC · JPL
372904	2011 AF_{58}	—	December 13, 2010	Mount Lemmon	Mount Lemmon Survey	·	1.9 km	MPC · JPL
372905	2011 AF_{61}	—	January 13, 2011	Kitt Peak	Spacewatch	·	2.1 km	MPC · JPL
372906	2011 AM_{65}	—	February 23, 2007	Kitt Peak	Spacewatch	·	1.8 km	MPC · JPL
372907	2011 AT_{65}	—	January 14, 2011	Kitt Peak	Spacewatch	·	1.4 km	MPC · JPL
372908	2011 AZ_{67}	—	January 27, 2007	Mount Lemmon	Mount Lemmon Survey	·	1.0 km	MPC · JPL
372909	2011 AY_{68}	—	April 22, 2007	Catalina	CSS	·	2.7 km	MPC · JPL
372910	2011 AB_{70}	—	January 10, 2007	Kitt Peak	Spacewatch	·	1.2 km	MPC · JPL
372911	2011 AJ_{75}	—	December 12, 2006	Kitt Peak	Spacewatch	V	1.0 km	MPC · JPL
372912	2011 AN_{76}	—	September 14, 1994	Kitt Peak	Spacewatch	·	1.5 km	MPC · JPL
372913	2011 AN_{77}	—	April 12, 2000	Kitt Peak	Spacewatch	MAS	980 m	MPC · JPL
372914	2011 BD	—	December 14, 2010	Mount Lemmon	Mount Lemmon Survey	·	1.7 km	MPC · JPL
372915	2011 BW_{4}	—	December 5, 2010	Mount Lemmon	Mount Lemmon Survey	·	2.3 km	MPC · JPL
372916	2011 BA_{5}	—	November 25, 2006	Kitt Peak	Spacewatch	·	1.0 km	MPC · JPL
372917	2011 BV_{5}	—	November 10, 2006	Kitt Peak	Spacewatch	·	1.4 km	MPC · JPL
372918	2011 BW_{5}	—	January 27, 2007	Mount Lemmon	Mount Lemmon Survey	·	820 m	MPC · JPL
372919	2011 BW_{8}	—	November 15, 2006	Kitt Peak	Spacewatch	·	1.1 km	MPC · JPL
372920	2011 BO_{9}	—	December 22, 2006	Kitt Peak	Spacewatch	MAS	800 m	MPC · JPL
372921	2011 BT_{9}	—	September 20, 2009	Kitt Peak	Spacewatch	HOF	2.4 km	MPC · JPL
372922	2011 BM_{17}	—	August 21, 2004	Siding Spring	SSS	WIT	1.1 km	MPC · JPL
372923	2011 BV_{19}	—	November 1, 2005	Catalina	CSS	·	1.9 km	MPC · JPL
372924	2011 BC_{21}	—	February 8, 2002	Kitt Peak	Spacewatch	·	2.1 km	MPC · JPL
372925	2011 BW_{21}	—	October 7, 2005	Kitt Peak	Spacewatch	·	1.4 km	MPC · JPL
372926	2011 BR_{22}	—	October 17, 2009	Catalina	CSS	HOF	2.6 km	MPC · JPL
372927	2011 BO_{25}	—	September 19, 2009	Kitt Peak	Spacewatch	·	2.2 km	MPC · JPL
372928	2011 BW_{27}	—	March 10, 2000	Kitt Peak	Spacewatch	·	3.0 km	MPC · JPL
372929	2011 BG_{28}	—	January 15, 2005	Catalina	CSS	·	4.5 km	MPC · JPL
372930	2011 BZ_{28}	—	October 24, 2005	Kitt Peak	Spacewatch	·	1.3 km	MPC · JPL
372931	2011 BE_{32}	—	February 21, 2007	Mount Lemmon	Mount Lemmon Survey	·	1.2 km	MPC · JPL
372932	2011 BL_{35}	—	February 23, 2007	Kitt Peak	Spacewatch	·	980 m	MPC · JPL
372933	2011 BC_{38}	—	December 2, 2010	Mount Lemmon	Mount Lemmon Survey	·	2.8 km	MPC · JPL
372934	2011 BS_{46}	—	September 15, 2004	Kitt Peak	Spacewatch	AGN	1.3 km	MPC · JPL
372935	2011 BT_{47}	—	January 31, 2011	Piszkés-tető	K. Sárneczky, Z. Kuli	LUT	5.6 km	MPC · JPL
372936	2011 BN_{51}	—	December 25, 2005	Kitt Peak	Spacewatch	AGN	1.6 km	MPC · JPL
372937	2011 BO_{53}	—	November 16, 2006	Mount Lemmon	Mount Lemmon Survey	·	1.2 km	MPC · JPL
372938	2011 BC_{54}	—	February 27, 2006	Kitt Peak	Spacewatch	THM	2.1 km	MPC · JPL
372939	2011 BF_{61}	—	April 7, 2008	Mount Lemmon	Mount Lemmon Survey	·	1.8 km	MPC · JPL
372940	2011 BX_{66}	—	September 5, 2008	Kitt Peak	Spacewatch	EOS	1.8 km	MPC · JPL
372941	2011 BQ_{70}	—	February 25, 2007	Mount Lemmon	Mount Lemmon Survey	·	1.5 km	MPC · JPL
372942	2011 BN_{71}	—	October 1, 2000	Socorro	LINEAR	·	2.0 km	MPC · JPL
372943	2011 BQ_{71}	—	September 6, 2008	Kitt Peak	Spacewatch	·	2.2 km	MPC · JPL
372944	2011 BF_{73}	—	September 18, 2003	Kitt Peak	Spacewatch	·	2.2 km	MPC · JPL
372945	2011 BN_{73}	—	November 15, 2006	Catalina	CSS	·	1.1 km	MPC · JPL
372946	2011 BO_{73}	—	October 29, 2005	Catalina	CSS	·	1.3 km	MPC · JPL
372947	2011 BL_{74}	—	September 22, 2009	Mount Lemmon	Mount Lemmon Survey	·	1.6 km	MPC · JPL
372948	2011 BE_{76}	—	March 13, 2007	Kitt Peak	Spacewatch	·	2.2 km	MPC · JPL
372949	2011 BR_{76}	—	February 26, 2007	Mount Lemmon	Mount Lemmon Survey	·	1.4 km	MPC · JPL
372950	2011 BO_{78}	—	November 22, 2006	Mount Lemmon	Mount Lemmon Survey	·	1.1 km	MPC · JPL
372951	2011 BY_{78}	—	October 25, 2005	Mount Lemmon	Mount Lemmon Survey	MRX	1.1 km	MPC · JPL
372952	2011 BL_{85}	—	November 22, 2005	Kitt Peak	Spacewatch	·	1.9 km	MPC · JPL
372953	2011 BJ_{86}	—	October 16, 2009	Mount Lemmon	Mount Lemmon Survey	·	1.4 km	MPC · JPL
372954	2011 BJ_{89}	—	January 22, 1998	Kitt Peak	Spacewatch	·	2.1 km	MPC · JPL
372955	2011 BO_{89}	—	December 28, 2005	Kitt Peak	Spacewatch	·	2.2 km	MPC · JPL
372956	2011 BX_{89}	—	February 7, 2002	Kitt Peak	Spacewatch	·	1.9 km	MPC · JPL
372957	2011 BA_{97}	—	January 14, 2011	Kitt Peak	Spacewatch	·	2.2 km	MPC · JPL
372958	2011 BU_{99}	—	November 29, 2005	Kitt Peak	Spacewatch	WIT	1.2 km	MPC · JPL
372959	2011 BQ_{102}	—	December 26, 2006	Kitt Peak	Spacewatch	·	1.2 km	MPC · JPL
372960	2011 BS_{103}	—	November 19, 1995	Kitt Peak	Spacewatch	·	1.6 km	MPC · JPL
372961	2011 BH_{104}	—	September 25, 2008	Mount Lemmon	Mount Lemmon Survey	HYG	2.7 km	MPC · JPL
372962	2011 BL_{105}	—	February 8, 2002	Kitt Peak	Spacewatch	·	2.1 km	MPC · JPL
372963	2011 BY_{111}	—	November 5, 2005	Kitt Peak	Spacewatch	fast?	1.2 km	MPC · JPL
372964	2011 BT_{112}	—	December 19, 2001	Kitt Peak	Spacewatch	·	1.6 km	MPC · JPL
372965	2011 BS_{116}	—	October 30, 2005	Kitt Peak	Spacewatch	·	1.7 km	MPC · JPL
372966	2011 BK_{119}	—	October 14, 2001	Kitt Peak	Spacewatch	·	1.3 km	MPC · JPL
372967	2011 BV_{124}	—	August 31, 2005	Kitt Peak	Spacewatch	·	1.0 km	MPC · JPL
372968	2011 BP_{152}	—	January 11, 2002	Kitt Peak	Spacewatch	·	1.7 km	MPC · JPL
372969	2011 CX	—	September 7, 2008	Mount Lemmon	Mount Lemmon Survey	·	3.4 km	MPC · JPL
372970	2011 CD_{2}	—	December 27, 2005	Kitt Peak	Spacewatch	·	2.4 km	MPC · JPL
372971	2011 CW_{10}	—	August 28, 2005	Kitt Peak	Spacewatch	·	930 m	MPC · JPL
372972	2011 CT_{14}	—	January 20, 2006	Kitt Peak	Spacewatch	·	2.3 km	MPC · JPL
372973	2011 CV_{27}	—	December 11, 2006	Kitt Peak	Spacewatch	·	1.1 km	MPC · JPL
372974	2011 CE_{32}	—	October 25, 2009	Kitt Peak	Spacewatch	AGN	1.1 km	MPC · JPL
372975	2011 CT_{33}	—	August 22, 2004	Siding Spring	SSS	·	2.9 km	MPC · JPL
372976	2011 CF_{34}	—	December 8, 2010	Mount Lemmon	Mount Lemmon Survey	NYS	1.3 km	MPC · JPL
372977	2011 CT_{34}	—	September 26, 2009	Kitt Peak	Spacewatch	MRX	1.1 km	MPC · JPL
372978	2011 CZ_{34}	—	September 30, 2009	Mount Lemmon	Mount Lemmon Survey	·	2.1 km	MPC · JPL
372979	2011 CB_{49}	—	February 15, 1997	Kitt Peak	Spacewatch	·	2.7 km	MPC · JPL
372980	2011 CY_{49}	—	September 6, 2008	Kitt Peak	Spacewatch	·	3.2 km	MPC · JPL
372981	2011 CY_{53}	—	January 23, 2006	Kitt Peak	Spacewatch	·	1.6 km	MPC · JPL
372982	2011 CB_{54}	—	September 29, 1995	Kitt Peak	Spacewatch	·	1.8 km	MPC · JPL
372983	2011 CP_{59}	—	May 6, 2006	Mount Lemmon	Mount Lemmon Survey	·	2.4 km	MPC · JPL
372984	2011 CS_{67}	—	September 9, 2004	Socorro	LINEAR	·	2.3 km	MPC · JPL
372985	2011 CT_{68}	—	October 14, 2009	Mount Lemmon	Mount Lemmon Survey	·	2.0 km	MPC · JPL
372986	2011 CS_{70}	—	December 31, 2005	Kitt Peak	Spacewatch	·	1.8 km	MPC · JPL
372987	2011 CF_{71}	—	October 26, 2009	Mount Lemmon	Mount Lemmon Survey	MRX	1.2 km	MPC · JPL
372988	2011 CK_{71}	—	March 27, 2000	Kitt Peak	Spacewatch	·	1.6 km	MPC · JPL
372989	2011 CE_{73}	—	March 9, 2003	Anderson Mesa	LONEOS	·	1.8 km	MPC · JPL
372990	2011 CJ_{74}	—	October 10, 1996	Kitt Peak	Spacewatch	·	1.6 km	MPC · JPL
372991	2011 CN_{75}	—	December 31, 1997	Kitt Peak	Spacewatch	EUN	1.6 km	MPC · JPL
372992	2011 CQ_{76}	—	March 14, 2007	Mount Lemmon	Mount Lemmon Survey	·	1.8 km	MPC · JPL
372993	2011 CP_{80}	—	March 15, 2004	Kitt Peak	Spacewatch	·	1.4 km	MPC · JPL
372994	2011 CD_{86}	—	October 1, 2003	Kitt Peak	Spacewatch	·	2.8 km	MPC · JPL
372995	2011 CQ_{86}	—	September 18, 2009	Kitt Peak	Spacewatch	·	1.3 km	MPC · JPL
372996	2011 CD_{87}	—	August 25, 2004	Kitt Peak	Spacewatch	·	2.0 km	MPC · JPL
372997	2011 CC_{88}	—	January 26, 2006	Mount Lemmon	Mount Lemmon Survey	·	2.2 km	MPC · JPL
372998	2011 CW_{89}	—	November 19, 2009	Mount Lemmon	Mount Lemmon Survey	·	2.0 km	MPC · JPL
372999	2011 CR_{90}	—	March 3, 2006	Kitt Peak	Spacewatch	·	2.1 km	MPC · JPL
373000	2011 CF_{92}	—	January 27, 2006	Mount Lemmon	Mount Lemmon Survey	·	1.8 km	MPC · JPL

back to top

== See also ==
- Meanings of minor-planet names: 372001–373000
