= List of minor planets: 371001–372000 =

The following is a partial list of minor planets, running from minor-planet number 371001 through 372000, inclusive. The primary data for this and other partial lists is based on JPL's "Small-Body Orbital Elements" and data available from the Minor Planet Center. Critical list information is also provided by the MPC, unless otherwise specified from Lowell Observatory. A detailed description of the table's columns and additional sources are given on the main page including a complete list of every page in this series, and a statistical break-up on the dynamical classification of minor planets.

Also see the summary list of all named bodies in numerical and alphabetical order, and the corresponding naming citations for the number range of this particular list. New namings may only be added to this list after official publication, as the preannouncement of names is condemned by the Working Group for Small Bodies Nomenclature of the International Astronomical Union.

Near-Earth obj.	MBA (inner)	MBA (outer)	Centaur
Mars-crosser	MBA (middle)	Jupiter trojan	Trans-Neptunian obj.
Unclassified

== 371001–371100 ==
Designation			Discovery			Properties		Ref
Permanent	Provisional	Named after	Date	Site	Discoverer(s)	Category	Diam.	Ref
371001	2005 TZ_{90}	—	August 30, 2005	Kitt Peak	Spacewatch	·	990 m	MPC · JPL
371002	2005 TH_{107}	—	October 4, 2005	Mount Lemmon	Mount Lemmon Survey	·	770 m	MPC · JPL
371003	2005 TB_{109}	—	October 7, 2005	Kitt Peak	Spacewatch	·	840 m	MPC · JPL
371004	2005 TL_{114}	—	October 7, 2005	Kitt Peak	Spacewatch	·	1.4 km	MPC · JPL
371005	2005 TC_{138}	—	October 7, 2005	Catalina	CSS	·	1.5 km	MPC · JPL
371006	2005 TV_{154}	—	September 29, 2005	Kitt Peak	Spacewatch	·	1.9 km	MPC · JPL
371007	2005 TM_{160}	—	October 9, 2005	Kitt Peak	Spacewatch	·	600 m	MPC · JPL
371008	2005 TY_{165}	—	October 9, 2005	Kitt Peak	Spacewatch	·	1.1 km	MPC · JPL
371009	2005 TC_{172}	—	October 10, 2005	Kitt Peak	Spacewatch	(5)	1.0 km	MPC · JPL
371010	2005 TE_{178}	—	October 1, 2005	Kitt Peak	Spacewatch	·	1.0 km	MPC · JPL
371011	2005 TV_{195}	—	October 1, 2005	Kitt Peak	Spacewatch	·	1.1 km	MPC · JPL
371012	2005 UT_{16}	—	October 22, 2005	Kitt Peak	Spacewatch	·	1.0 km	MPC · JPL
371013	2005 UB_{20}	—	October 22, 2005	Kitt Peak	Spacewatch	·	2.0 km	MPC · JPL
371014	2005 UJ_{22}	—	October 23, 2005	Kitt Peak	Spacewatch	·	1.4 km	MPC · JPL
371015	2005 UJ_{27}	—	October 23, 2005	Catalina	CSS	·	990 m	MPC · JPL
371016	2005 UD_{38}	—	October 24, 2005	Kitt Peak	Spacewatch	·	1.4 km	MPC · JPL
371017	2005 UK_{40}	—	October 24, 2005	Kitt Peak	Spacewatch	·	1.1 km	MPC · JPL
371018	2005 UH_{46}	—	October 22, 2005	Kitt Peak	Spacewatch	·	1.4 km	MPC · JPL
371019	2005 UD_{50}	—	October 23, 2005	Catalina	CSS	·	1.5 km	MPC · JPL
371020	2005 UP_{58}	—	October 24, 2005	Kitt Peak	Spacewatch	·	1.2 km	MPC · JPL
371021	2005 UM_{63}	—	October 25, 2005	Mount Lemmon	Mount Lemmon Survey	·	1.5 km	MPC · JPL
371022	2005 UU_{63}	—	October 25, 2005	Mount Lemmon	Mount Lemmon Survey	·	1.3 km	MPC · JPL
371023	2005 UP_{65}	—	September 29, 2005	Catalina	CSS	·	2.0 km	MPC · JPL
371024	2005 UN_{66}	—	October 22, 2005	Kitt Peak	Spacewatch	·	1.4 km	MPC · JPL
371025	2005 UZ_{71}	—	October 23, 2005	Catalina	CSS	H	710 m	MPC · JPL
371026	2005 UL_{76}	—	October 24, 2005	Palomar	NEAT	EUN	1.5 km	MPC · JPL
371027	2005 UL_{78}	—	October 25, 2005	Mount Lemmon	Mount Lemmon Survey	·	1.5 km	MPC · JPL
371028	2005 UK_{90}	—	October 22, 2005	Kitt Peak	Spacewatch	·	1.6 km	MPC · JPL
371029	2005 UP_{97}	—	October 22, 2005	Kitt Peak	Spacewatch	·	1.4 km	MPC · JPL
371030	2005 UR_{97}	—	October 22, 2005	Kitt Peak	Spacewatch	·	1.3 km	MPC · JPL
371031	2005 UF_{102}	—	October 22, 2005	Kitt Peak	Spacewatch	·	1.4 km	MPC · JPL
371032	2005 UK_{103}	—	October 22, 2005	Kitt Peak	Spacewatch	·	1.4 km	MPC · JPL
371033	2005 UM_{109}	—	October 22, 2005	Kitt Peak	Spacewatch	·	1.7 km	MPC · JPL
371034	2005 UK_{114}	—	October 22, 2005	Catalina	CSS	·	1.3 km	MPC · JPL
371035	2005 UR_{149}	—	October 26, 2005	Kitt Peak	Spacewatch	·	1.1 km	MPC · JPL
371036	2005 UZ_{151}	—	October 26, 2005	Kitt Peak	Spacewatch	·	1.0 km	MPC · JPL
371037	2005 UM_{152}	—	October 26, 2005	Kitt Peak	Spacewatch	·	3.0 km	MPC · JPL
371038	2005 UC_{153}	—	October 26, 2005	Kitt Peak	Spacewatch	·	1.4 km	MPC · JPL
371039	2005 US_{153}	—	October 26, 2005	Kitt Peak	Spacewatch	·	1.7 km	MPC · JPL
371040	2005 UJ_{161}	—	October 22, 2005	Palomar	NEAT	·	1.1 km	MPC · JPL
371041	2005 UL_{161}	—	October 23, 2005	Kitt Peak	Spacewatch	·	1.2 km	MPC · JPL
371042	2005 UM_{162}	—	October 27, 2005	Anderson Mesa	LONEOS	·	1.1 km	MPC · JPL
371043	2005 UC_{163}	—	October 23, 2005	Kitt Peak	Spacewatch	·	1.1 km	MPC · JPL
371044	2005 UJ_{163}	—	October 23, 2005	Kitt Peak	Spacewatch	·	1.1 km	MPC · JPL
371045	2005 UE_{167}	—	October 24, 2005	Kitt Peak	Spacewatch	·	1.7 km	MPC · JPL
371046	2005 UZ_{173}	—	October 24, 2005	Kitt Peak	Spacewatch	·	2.1 km	MPC · JPL
371047	2005 UT_{174}	—	October 24, 2005	Kitt Peak	Spacewatch	(5)	1.9 km	MPC · JPL
371048	2005 UD_{182}	—	October 24, 2005	Kitt Peak	Spacewatch	·	1.8 km	MPC · JPL
371049	2005 UT_{186}	—	October 26, 2005	Kitt Peak	Spacewatch	·	1.5 km	MPC · JPL
371050	2005 UX_{199}	—	October 25, 2005	Kitt Peak	Spacewatch	·	1.2 km	MPC · JPL
371051	2005 UG_{202}	—	October 25, 2005	Kitt Peak	Spacewatch	(5)	1.2 km	MPC · JPL
371052	2005 UK_{214}	—	October 25, 2005	Catalina	CSS	·	1.4 km	MPC · JPL
371053	2005 UX_{217}	—	October 22, 2005	Kitt Peak	Spacewatch	·	1.4 km	MPC · JPL
371054	2005 US_{222}	—	October 25, 2005	Kitt Peak	Spacewatch	·	1.5 km	MPC · JPL
371055	2005 UX_{225}	—	October 25, 2005	Kitt Peak	Spacewatch	·	1.4 km	MPC · JPL
371056	2005 UE_{229}	—	October 25, 2005	Kitt Peak	Spacewatch	·	1.3 km	MPC · JPL
371057	2005 UL_{234}	—	October 25, 2005	Kitt Peak	Spacewatch	·	1.1 km	MPC · JPL
371058	2005 UE_{235}	—	October 25, 2005	Kitt Peak	Spacewatch	(5)	1.0 km	MPC · JPL
371059	2005 UY_{238}	—	October 25, 2005	Kitt Peak	Spacewatch	JUN	1.6 km	MPC · JPL
371060	2005 UA_{249}	—	October 28, 2005	Mount Lemmon	Mount Lemmon Survey	·	1.9 km	MPC · JPL
371061	2005 UJ_{249}	—	October 28, 2005	Mount Lemmon	Mount Lemmon Survey	·	1.9 km	MPC · JPL
371062	2005 UU_{251}	—	October 24, 2005	Kitt Peak	Spacewatch	(5)	1.1 km	MPC · JPL
371063	2005 UB_{253}	—	October 26, 2005	Palomar	NEAT	·	1.7 km	MPC · JPL
371064	2005 UH_{259}	—	October 25, 2005	Kitt Peak	Spacewatch	(5)	1.3 km	MPC · JPL
371065	2005 UX_{260}	—	October 25, 2005	Mount Lemmon	Mount Lemmon Survey	·	1.2 km	MPC · JPL
371066	2005 UG_{261}	—	October 25, 2005	Mount Lemmon	Mount Lemmon Survey	EUN	1.6 km	MPC · JPL
371067	2005 UD_{276}	—	October 24, 2005	Kitt Peak	Spacewatch	·	1.1 km	MPC · JPL
371068	2005 US_{277}	—	October 24, 2005	Kitt Peak	Spacewatch	·	1.1 km	MPC · JPL
371069	2005 UT_{280}	—	October 24, 2005	Kitt Peak	Spacewatch	·	1.9 km	MPC · JPL
371070	2005 UR_{281}	—	October 25, 2005	Mount Lemmon	Mount Lemmon Survey	·	1.2 km	MPC · JPL
371071	2005 UU_{290}	—	October 26, 2005	Kitt Peak	Spacewatch	(5)	1.1 km	MPC · JPL
371072	2005 UQ_{292}	—	October 26, 2005	Kitt Peak	Spacewatch	·	1.1 km	MPC · JPL
371073	2005 UF_{307}	—	October 27, 2005	Mount Lemmon	Mount Lemmon Survey	·	1.7 km	MPC · JPL
371074	2005 US_{307}	—	October 27, 2005	Mount Lemmon	Mount Lemmon Survey	·	1.3 km	MPC · JPL
371075	2005 UD_{327}	—	October 29, 2005	Kitt Peak	Spacewatch	·	1.7 km	MPC · JPL
371076	2005 UE_{327}	—	October 29, 2005	Kitt Peak	Spacewatch	·	1.9 km	MPC · JPL
371077	2005 UW_{333}	—	October 29, 2005	Mount Lemmon	Mount Lemmon Survey	·	1.9 km	MPC · JPL
371078	2005 US_{349}	—	October 27, 2005	Mount Lemmon	Mount Lemmon Survey	H	520 m	MPC · JPL
371079	2005 UO_{352}	—	October 29, 2005	Catalina	CSS	·	2.0 km	MPC · JPL
371080	2005 UJ_{368}	—	October 27, 2005	Kitt Peak	Spacewatch	·	1.3 km	MPC · JPL
371081	2005 UV_{369}	—	October 27, 2005	Kitt Peak	Spacewatch	·	1.5 km	MPC · JPL
371082	2005 UY_{383}	—	October 27, 2005	Catalina	CSS	ADE	2.6 km	MPC · JPL
371083	2005 UA_{388}	—	October 26, 2005	Kitt Peak	Spacewatch	·	1.3 km	MPC · JPL
371084	2005 UA_{391}	—	October 29, 2005	Mount Lemmon	Mount Lemmon Survey	·	1.2 km	MPC · JPL
371085	2005 UA_{397}	—	October 27, 2005	Catalina	CSS	·	1.6 km	MPC · JPL
371086	2005 UA_{400}	—	October 26, 2005	Kitt Peak	Spacewatch	·	1.2 km	MPC · JPL
371087	2005 UA_{421}	—	October 26, 2005	Kitt Peak	Spacewatch	·	1.6 km	MPC · JPL
371088	2005 UT_{437}	—	October 22, 2005	Kitt Peak	Spacewatch	·	1.3 km	MPC · JPL
371089	2005 UJ_{443}	—	October 30, 2005	Socorro	LINEAR	·	970 m	MPC · JPL
371090	2005 UB_{444}	—	October 30, 2005	Socorro	LINEAR	·	1.3 km	MPC · JPL
371091	2005 UN_{449}	—	October 30, 2005	Socorro	LINEAR	·	3.0 km	MPC · JPL
371092	2005 UA_{459}	—	October 30, 2005	Palomar	NEAT	·	1.2 km	MPC · JPL
371093	2005 UZ_{461}	—	October 30, 2005	Kitt Peak	Spacewatch	·	870 m	MPC · JPL
371094	2005 UD_{463}	—	October 30, 2005	Kitt Peak	Spacewatch	·	1.1 km	MPC · JPL
371095	2005 UT_{468}	—	October 30, 2005	Kitt Peak	Spacewatch	·	2.4 km	MPC · JPL
371096	2005 UR_{475}	—	October 22, 2005	Kitt Peak	Spacewatch	·	1.3 km	MPC · JPL
371097	2005 UU_{509}	—	October 22, 2005	Kitt Peak	Spacewatch	(5)	990 m	MPC · JPL
371098	2005 UR_{510}	—	October 25, 2005	Mount Lemmon	Mount Lemmon Survey	·	940 m	MPC · JPL
371099	2005 UO_{512}	—	October 30, 2005	Mount Lemmon	Mount Lemmon Survey	·	1.2 km	MPC · JPL
371100	2005 UC_{520}	—	October 26, 2005	Apache Point	A. C. Becker	·	1.2 km	MPC · JPL

== 371101–371200 ==
back to top

Designation			Discovery			Properties		Ref
Permanent	Provisional	Named after	Date	Site	Discoverer(s)	Category	Diam.	Ref
371101	2005 VW_{6}	—	November 6, 2005	Mount Lemmon	Mount Lemmon Survey	·	1.0 km	MPC · JPL
371102	2005 VH_{7}	—	November 13, 2005	Desert Moon	Stevens, B. L.	·	1.4 km	MPC · JPL
371103	2005 VR_{15}	—	November 1, 2005	Catalina	CSS	·	1.6 km	MPC · JPL
371104	2005 VK_{26}	—	October 3, 2005	Kitt Peak	Spacewatch	·	1.1 km	MPC · JPL
371105	2005 VF_{44}	—	November 3, 2005	Mount Lemmon	Mount Lemmon Survey	3:2 · SHU	6.0 km	MPC · JPL
371106	2005 VD_{51}	—	November 3, 2005	Catalina	CSS	KON	2.0 km	MPC · JPL
371107	2005 VY_{60}	—	November 5, 2005	Kitt Peak	Spacewatch	·	1.1 km	MPC · JPL
371108	2005 VH_{61}	—	November 5, 2005	Catalina	CSS	(5)	1.5 km	MPC · JPL
371109	2005 VZ_{74}	—	November 1, 2005	Mount Lemmon	Mount Lemmon Survey	·	1.3 km	MPC · JPL
371110	2005 VB_{75}	—	November 1, 2005	Mount Lemmon	Mount Lemmon Survey	·	870 m	MPC · JPL
371111	2005 VA_{88}	—	November 6, 2005	Kitt Peak	Spacewatch	·	1.5 km	MPC · JPL
371112	2005 VH_{88}	—	October 25, 2005	Kitt Peak	Spacewatch	·	1.5 km	MPC · JPL
371113	2005 VR_{88}	—	November 6, 2005	Kitt Peak	Spacewatch	·	1.2 km	MPC · JPL
371114	2005 VE_{89}	—	October 29, 2005	Kitt Peak	Spacewatch	·	1.5 km	MPC · JPL
371115	2005 VS_{98}	—	November 10, 2005	Catalina	CSS	EUN	1.7 km	MPC · JPL
371116	2005 VZ_{99}	—	November 1, 2005	Kitt Peak	Spacewatch	·	1.2 km	MPC · JPL
371117	2005 VM_{107}	—	November 5, 2005	Kitt Peak	Spacewatch	(5)	1.1 km	MPC · JPL
371118	2005 VS_{111}	—	November 6, 2005	Mount Lemmon	Mount Lemmon Survey	(5)	1.5 km	MPC · JPL
371119	2005 VD_{120}	—	November 10, 2005	Mount Lemmon	Mount Lemmon Survey	EUN	1.9 km	MPC · JPL
371120	2005 VN_{126}	—	November 1, 2005	Apache Point	A. C. Becker	·	1.2 km	MPC · JPL
371121	2005 WG_{19}	—	November 24, 2005	Palomar	NEAT	·	980 m	MPC · JPL
371122	2005 WS_{24}	—	November 21, 2005	Kitt Peak	Spacewatch	·	1.2 km	MPC · JPL
371123	2005 WQ_{30}	—	November 21, 2005	Kitt Peak	Spacewatch	(5)	1.4 km	MPC · JPL
371124	2005 WV_{32}	—	November 21, 2005	Kitt Peak	Spacewatch	·	2.0 km	MPC · JPL
371125	2005 WA_{35}	—	November 22, 2005	Kitt Peak	Spacewatch	·	1.3 km	MPC · JPL
371126	2005 WT_{35}	—	November 22, 2005	Kitt Peak	Spacewatch	(5)	1.6 km	MPC · JPL
371127	2005 WH_{40}	—	November 25, 2005	Mount Lemmon	Mount Lemmon Survey	·	1.2 km	MPC · JPL
371128	2005 WB_{54}	—	November 25, 2005	Catalina	CSS	·	1.6 km	MPC · JPL
371129	2005 WX_{62}	—	November 25, 2005	Catalina	CSS	·	1.5 km	MPC · JPL
371130	2005 WK_{77}	—	November 25, 2005	Kitt Peak	Spacewatch	·	2.1 km	MPC · JPL
371131	2005 WW_{78}	—	November 25, 2005	Kitt Peak	Spacewatch	(5)	1.7 km	MPC · JPL
371132	2005 WZ_{93}	—	November 26, 2005	Kitt Peak	Spacewatch	·	1.7 km	MPC · JPL
371133	2005 WZ_{97}	—	November 26, 2005	Kitt Peak	Spacewatch	·	1.1 km	MPC · JPL
371134	2005 WR_{104}	—	November 28, 2005	Catalina	CSS	·	2.8 km	MPC · JPL
371135	2005 WJ_{118}	—	November 28, 2005	Catalina	CSS	BRG	1.8 km	MPC · JPL
371136	2005 WZ_{121}	—	November 30, 2005	Socorro	LINEAR	·	2.5 km	MPC · JPL
371137	2005 WD_{122}	—	November 30, 2005	Kitt Peak	Spacewatch	·	1.3 km	MPC · JPL
371138	2005 WV_{131}	—	November 25, 2005	Mount Lemmon	Mount Lemmon Survey	·	1.2 km	MPC · JPL
371139	2005 WG_{134}	—	November 25, 2005	Mount Lemmon	Mount Lemmon Survey	·	1.5 km	MPC · JPL
371140	2005 WR_{134}	—	November 25, 2005	Mount Lemmon	Mount Lemmon Survey	·	1.7 km	MPC · JPL
371141	2005 WX_{149}	—	November 28, 2005	Kitt Peak	Spacewatch	·	1.3 km	MPC · JPL
371142	2005 WX_{152}	—	November 29, 2005	Kitt Peak	Spacewatch	·	1.9 km	MPC · JPL
371143	2005 WF_{172}	—	November 30, 2005	Mount Lemmon	Mount Lemmon Survey	AEO	1.2 km	MPC · JPL
371144	2005 WN_{176}	—	November 30, 2005	Kitt Peak	Spacewatch	AGN	940 m	MPC · JPL
371145	2005 WV_{177}	—	November 30, 2005	Kitt Peak	Spacewatch	·	1.2 km	MPC · JPL
371146	2005 XR_{21}	—	December 2, 2005	Mount Lemmon	Mount Lemmon Survey	·	1.4 km	MPC · JPL
371147	2005 XA_{24}	—	December 2, 2005	Mount Lemmon	Mount Lemmon Survey	·	2.0 km	MPC · JPL
371148	2005 XA_{27}	—	December 4, 2005	Kitt Peak	Spacewatch	·	1.3 km	MPC · JPL
371149	2005 XC_{35}	—	December 4, 2005	Kitt Peak	Spacewatch	·	1.5 km	MPC · JPL
371150	2005 XP_{41}	—	November 30, 2005	Kitt Peak	Spacewatch	WIT	930 m	MPC · JPL
371151	2005 XA_{43}	—	December 2, 2005	Kitt Peak	Spacewatch	·	1.8 km	MPC · JPL
371152	2005 XR_{48}	—	December 2, 2005	Mount Lemmon	Mount Lemmon Survey	·	1.3 km	MPC · JPL
371153	2005 XJ_{54}	—	December 5, 2005	Kitt Peak	Spacewatch	·	1.2 km	MPC · JPL
371154	2005 XC_{65}	—	December 7, 2005	Kitt Peak	Spacewatch	·	1.9 km	MPC · JPL
371155	2005 XQ_{73}	—	December 6, 2005	Kitt Peak	Spacewatch	·	1.9 km	MPC · JPL
371156	2005 XU_{74}	—	December 6, 2005	Kitt Peak	Spacewatch	(5)	1.7 km	MPC · JPL
371157	2005 XK_{75}	—	December 6, 2005	Kitt Peak	Spacewatch	·	1.6 km	MPC · JPL
371158	2005 XF_{78}	—	December 1, 2005	Anderson Mesa	LONEOS	·	2.2 km	MPC · JPL
371159	2005 XW_{101}	—	December 1, 2005	Kitt Peak	M. W. Buie	·	1.9 km	MPC · JPL
371160	2005 XV_{102}	—	December 1, 2005	Kitt Peak	M. W. Buie	·	2.0 km	MPC · JPL
371161	2005 YU_{15}	—	December 22, 2005	Kitt Peak	Spacewatch	·	2.0 km	MPC · JPL
371162	2005 YQ_{17}	—	November 6, 2005	Mount Lemmon	Mount Lemmon Survey	·	1.6 km	MPC · JPL
371163	2005 YY_{20}	—	December 24, 2005	Kitt Peak	Spacewatch	·	1.3 km	MPC · JPL
371164	2005 YS_{24}	—	December 24, 2005	Kitt Peak	Spacewatch	·	1.9 km	MPC · JPL
371165	2005 YO_{26}	—	December 21, 2005	Kitt Peak	Spacewatch	·	1.5 km	MPC · JPL
371166	2005 YT_{31}	—	December 22, 2005	Kitt Peak	Spacewatch	·	2.4 km	MPC · JPL
371167	2005 YB_{33}	—	December 22, 2005	Kitt Peak	Spacewatch	·	1.6 km	MPC · JPL
371168	2005 YP_{33}	—	December 24, 2005	Kitt Peak	Spacewatch	·	1.6 km	MPC · JPL
371169	2005 YD_{34}	—	December 24, 2005	Kitt Peak	Spacewatch	AEO	1.2 km	MPC · JPL
371170	2005 YE_{40}	—	December 22, 2005	Kitt Peak	Spacewatch	·	1.8 km	MPC · JPL
371171	2005 YH_{42}	—	December 24, 2005	Kitt Peak	Spacewatch	·	1.7 km	MPC · JPL
371172	2005 YL_{48}	—	December 22, 2005	Kitt Peak	Spacewatch	·	2.0 km	MPC · JPL
371173	2005 YY_{48}	—	December 22, 2005	Kitt Peak	Spacewatch	·	2.2 km	MPC · JPL
371174	2005 YC_{55}	—	December 25, 2005	Kitt Peak	Spacewatch	·	2.1 km	MPC · JPL
371175	2005 YG_{80}	—	December 24, 2005	Kitt Peak	Spacewatch	·	1.8 km	MPC · JPL
371176	2005 YR_{80}	—	December 24, 2005	Kitt Peak	Spacewatch	·	2.5 km	MPC · JPL
371177	2005 YZ_{81}	—	December 24, 2005	Kitt Peak	Spacewatch	·	2.4 km	MPC · JPL
371178	2005 YS_{82}	—	December 24, 2005	Kitt Peak	Spacewatch	WIT	1.2 km	MPC · JPL
371179	2005 YG_{87}	—	December 25, 2005	Mount Lemmon	Mount Lemmon Survey	·	1.6 km	MPC · JPL
371180	2005 YL_{87}	—	December 25, 2005	Mount Lemmon	Mount Lemmon Survey	·	2.3 km	MPC · JPL
371181	2005 YQ_{88}	—	December 25, 2005	Mount Lemmon	Mount Lemmon Survey	·	2.0 km	MPC · JPL
371182	2005 YX_{90}	—	December 26, 2005	Mount Lemmon	Mount Lemmon Survey	·	1.8 km	MPC · JPL
371183	2005 YA_{105}	—	December 25, 2005	Kitt Peak	Spacewatch	·	1.9 km	MPC · JPL
371184	2005 YV_{111}	—	December 25, 2005	Kitt Peak	Spacewatch	·	2.0 km	MPC · JPL
371185	2005 YH_{113}	—	December 25, 2005	Mount Lemmon	Mount Lemmon Survey	·	2.2 km	MPC · JPL
371186	2005 YX_{115}	—	December 25, 2005	Kitt Peak	Spacewatch	AGN	1.2 km	MPC · JPL
371187	2005 YF_{118}	—	December 10, 2005	Kitt Peak	Spacewatch	AGN	1.2 km	MPC · JPL
371188	2005 YK_{118}	—	December 25, 2005	Kitt Peak	Spacewatch	KOR	1.6 km	MPC · JPL
371189	2005 YV_{126}	—	December 26, 2005	Kitt Peak	Spacewatch	·	1.6 km	MPC · JPL
371190	2005 YW_{126}	—	December 26, 2005	Catalina	CSS	·	2.3 km	MPC · JPL
371191	2005 YA_{127}	—	December 27, 2005	Mount Lemmon	Mount Lemmon Survey	·	2.1 km	MPC · JPL
371192	2005 YF_{133}	—	December 26, 2005	Kitt Peak	Spacewatch	PAD	1.9 km	MPC · JPL
371193	2005 YG_{133}	—	November 30, 2005	Kitt Peak	Spacewatch	AGN	1.0 km	MPC · JPL
371194	2005 YN_{146}	—	December 29, 2005	Mount Lemmon	Mount Lemmon Survey	·	1.9 km	MPC · JPL
371195	2005 YW_{148}	—	December 25, 2005	Kitt Peak	Spacewatch	·	1.6 km	MPC · JPL
371196	2005 YL_{154}	—	December 29, 2005	Socorro	LINEAR	·	2.7 km	MPC · JPL
371197	2005 YO_{159}	—	December 27, 2005	Kitt Peak	Spacewatch	·	1.6 km	MPC · JPL
371198	2005 YC_{162}	—	December 27, 2005	Socorro	LINEAR	·	1.6 km	MPC · JPL
371199	2005 YJ_{176}	—	December 22, 2005	Kitt Peak	Spacewatch	·	1.5 km	MPC · JPL
371200	2005 YQ_{193}	—	November 29, 2005	Mount Lemmon	Mount Lemmon Survey	·	2.2 km	MPC · JPL

== 371201–371300 ==
back to top

Designation			Discovery			Properties		Ref
Permanent	Provisional	Named after	Date	Site	Discoverer(s)	Category	Diam.	Ref
371201	2005 YP_{208}	—	December 21, 2005	Catalina	CSS	·	1.1 km	MPC · JPL
371202	2005 YS_{213}	—	December 29, 2005	Socorro	LINEAR	·	1.6 km	MPC · JPL
371203	2005 YS_{289}	—	December 28, 2005	Mount Lemmon	Mount Lemmon Survey	L5	9.0 km	MPC · JPL
371204	2006 AN_{7}	—	January 5, 2006	Catalina	CSS	·	2.0 km	MPC · JPL
371205	2006 AT_{8}	—	January 2, 2006	Mount Lemmon	Mount Lemmon Survey	·	2.2 km	MPC · JPL
371206	2006 AO_{39}	—	January 7, 2006	Mount Lemmon	Mount Lemmon Survey	·	1.8 km	MPC · JPL
371207	2006 AG_{41}	—	January 7, 2006	Kitt Peak	Spacewatch	·	1.8 km	MPC · JPL
371208	2006 AU_{46}	—	December 29, 2005	Kitt Peak	Spacewatch	·	2.1 km	MPC · JPL
371209	2006 AF_{52}	—	January 5, 2006	Kitt Peak	Spacewatch	HOF	2.5 km	MPC · JPL
371210	2006 AK_{53}	—	January 5, 2006	Kitt Peak	Spacewatch	·	3.1 km	MPC · JPL
371211	2006 AQ_{54}	—	January 5, 2006	Kitt Peak	Spacewatch	AGN	920 m	MPC · JPL
371212	2006 AU_{66}	—	January 9, 2006	Kitt Peak	Spacewatch	·	1.9 km	MPC · JPL
371213	2006 AR_{75}	—	January 4, 2006	Mount Lemmon	Mount Lemmon Survey	HOF	2.5 km	MPC · JPL
371214	2006 AN_{81}	—	January 7, 2006	Mount Lemmon	Mount Lemmon Survey	GEF	1.7 km	MPC · JPL
371215	2006 AG_{92}	—	January 7, 2006	Mount Lemmon	Mount Lemmon Survey	·	1.3 km	MPC · JPL
371216	2006 AX_{92}	—	January 7, 2006	Kitt Peak	Spacewatch	·	2.1 km	MPC · JPL
371217	2006 AA_{101}	—	January 5, 2006	Mount Lemmon	Mount Lemmon Survey	·	1.8 km	MPC · JPL
371218	2006 AH_{101}	—	January 7, 2006	Mount Lemmon	Mount Lemmon Survey	·	2.3 km	MPC · JPL
371219	2006 AJ_{101}	—	January 8, 2006	Mount Lemmon	Mount Lemmon Survey	·	2.4 km	MPC · JPL
371220 Angers	2006 BD_{8}	Angers	January 22, 2006	Nogales	J.-C. Merlin	·	2.2 km	MPC · JPL
371221	2006 BM_{40}	—	January 21, 2006	Kitt Peak	Spacewatch	·	1.8 km	MPC · JPL
371222	2006 BR_{41}	—	January 22, 2006	Mount Lemmon	Mount Lemmon Survey	·	2.1 km	MPC · JPL
371223	2006 BJ_{47}	—	January 7, 2006	Kitt Peak	Spacewatch	·	1.8 km	MPC · JPL
371224	2006 BG_{50}	—	January 25, 2006	Kitt Peak	Spacewatch	·	2.2 km	MPC · JPL
371225	2006 BO_{52}	—	January 25, 2006	Kitt Peak	Spacewatch	AEO	1.2 km	MPC · JPL
371226	2006 BP_{52}	—	January 25, 2006	Kitt Peak	Spacewatch	NAE	2.4 km	MPC · JPL
371227	2006 BJ_{59}	—	December 28, 2005	Mount Lemmon	Mount Lemmon Survey	·	2.7 km	MPC · JPL
371228	2006 BO_{62}	—	January 24, 2006	Socorro	LINEAR	·	2.6 km	MPC · JPL
371229	2006 BS_{70}	—	January 23, 2006	Kitt Peak	Spacewatch	AGN	1.4 km	MPC · JPL
371230	2006 BJ_{73}	—	January 23, 2006	Kitt Peak	Spacewatch	·	2.3 km	MPC · JPL
371231	2006 BY_{74}	—	January 23, 2006	Kitt Peak	Spacewatch	KOR	1.2 km	MPC · JPL
371232	2006 BX_{79}	—	January 23, 2006	Kitt Peak	Spacewatch	·	3.3 km	MPC · JPL
371233	2006 BA_{80}	—	January 23, 2006	Kitt Peak	Spacewatch	·	2.2 km	MPC · JPL
371234	2006 BE_{87}	—	January 25, 2006	Kitt Peak	Spacewatch	·	1.9 km	MPC · JPL
371235	2006 BS_{89}	—	January 25, 2006	Kitt Peak	Spacewatch	·	2.2 km	MPC · JPL
371236	2006 BV_{89}	—	January 25, 2006	Kitt Peak	Spacewatch	TIR	2.9 km	MPC · JPL
371237	2006 BH_{94}	—	January 26, 2006	Kitt Peak	Spacewatch	·	2.1 km	MPC · JPL
371238	2006 BC_{97}	—	January 26, 2006	Mount Lemmon	Mount Lemmon Survey	·	4.3 km	MPC · JPL
371239	2006 BW_{121}	—	January 26, 2006	Mount Lemmon	Mount Lemmon Survey	AST	1.6 km	MPC · JPL
371240	2006 BT_{123}	—	January 26, 2006	Kitt Peak	Spacewatch	·	2.2 km	MPC · JPL
371241	2006 BW_{126}	—	October 10, 2004	Kitt Peak	Spacewatch	·	1.7 km	MPC · JPL
371242	2006 BR_{127}	—	January 26, 2006	Kitt Peak	Spacewatch	·	2.0 km	MPC · JPL
371243	2006 BP_{128}	—	January 26, 2006	Mount Lemmon	Mount Lemmon Survey	·	2.0 km	MPC · JPL
371244	2006 BA_{139}	—	January 28, 2006	Mount Lemmon	Mount Lemmon Survey	·	1.9 km	MPC · JPL
371245	2006 BJ_{144}	—	January 23, 2006	Catalina	CSS	·	2.7 km	MPC · JPL
371246	2006 BT_{145}	—	January 24, 2006	Socorro	LINEAR	·	3.5 km	MPC · JPL
371247	2006 BB_{148}	—	January 31, 2006	7300	W. K. Y. Yeung	·	1.7 km	MPC · JPL
371248	2006 BN_{152}	—	January 25, 2006	Kitt Peak	Spacewatch	KOR	1.5 km	MPC · JPL
371249	2006 BG_{156}	—	January 25, 2006	Kitt Peak	Spacewatch	·	2.0 km	MPC · JPL
371250	2006 BJ_{165}	—	January 26, 2006	Kitt Peak	Spacewatch	·	1.8 km	MPC · JPL
371251	2006 BV_{171}	—	January 27, 2006	Kitt Peak	Spacewatch	·	3.0 km	MPC · JPL
371252	2006 BT_{172}	—	January 27, 2006	Kitt Peak	Spacewatch	·	2.2 km	MPC · JPL
371253	2006 BV_{172}	—	January 27, 2006	Kitt Peak	Spacewatch	HOF	3.2 km	MPC · JPL
371254	2006 BL_{173}	—	January 27, 2006	Kitt Peak	Spacewatch	L5	7.8 km	MPC · JPL
371255	2006 BQ_{198}	—	January 30, 2006	Kitt Peak	Spacewatch	·	2.2 km	MPC · JPL
371256	2006 BJ_{224}	—	October 4, 1999	Kitt Peak	Spacewatch	HOF	3.5 km	MPC · JPL
371257	2006 BP_{224}	—	January 30, 2006	Kitt Peak	Spacewatch	·	2.1 km	MPC · JPL
371258	2006 BT_{224}	—	January 30, 2006	Kitt Peak	Spacewatch	·	2.2 km	MPC · JPL
371259	2006 BQ_{227}	—	January 30, 2006	Kitt Peak	Spacewatch	KOR	1.3 km	MPC · JPL
371260	2006 BU_{233}	—	January 23, 2006	Kitt Peak	Spacewatch	AGN	1.3 km	MPC · JPL
371261	2006 BS_{255}	—	January 31, 2006	Catalina	CSS	·	2.3 km	MPC · JPL
371262	2006 BY_{266}	—	January 25, 2006	Anderson Mesa	LONEOS	·	2.0 km	MPC · JPL
371263	2006 CC_{20}	—	February 1, 2006	Mount Lemmon	Mount Lemmon Survey	AGN	1.0 km	MPC · JPL
371264	2006 CM_{57}	—	February 4, 2006	Kitt Peak	Spacewatch	·	1.9 km	MPC · JPL
371265	2006 DW_{1}	—	February 20, 2006	Kitt Peak	Spacewatch	·	2.3 km	MPC · JPL
371266	2006 DU_{7}	—	February 20, 2006	Kitt Peak	Spacewatch	·	2.8 km	MPC · JPL
371267	2006 DM_{36}	—	February 20, 2006	Mount Lemmon	Mount Lemmon Survey	·	2.4 km	MPC · JPL
371268	2006 DJ_{44}	—	February 20, 2006	Catalina	CSS	·	2.9 km	MPC · JPL
371269	2006 DC_{45}	—	February 20, 2006	Kitt Peak	Spacewatch	EOS	4.0 km	MPC · JPL
371270	2006 DA_{46}	—	February 20, 2006	Kitt Peak	Spacewatch	·	2.0 km	MPC · JPL
371271	2006 DR_{49}	—	February 22, 2006	Catalina	CSS	·	2.6 km	MPC · JPL
371272	2006 DD_{77}	—	February 24, 2006	Kitt Peak	Spacewatch	THM	2.6 km	MPC · JPL
371273	2006 DP_{82}	—	February 24, 2006	Kitt Peak	Spacewatch	·	1.6 km	MPC · JPL
371274	2006 DR_{94}	—	February 24, 2006	Kitt Peak	Spacewatch	·	2.9 km	MPC · JPL
371275	2006 DE_{96}	—	February 24, 2006	Kitt Peak	Spacewatch	·	660 m	MPC · JPL
371276	2006 DX_{99}	—	February 25, 2006	Kitt Peak	Spacewatch	KOR	1.3 km	MPC · JPL
371277	2006 DW_{102}	—	February 25, 2006	Mount Lemmon	Mount Lemmon Survey	·	2.1 km	MPC · JPL
371278	2006 DK_{106}	—	February 25, 2006	Mount Lemmon	Mount Lemmon Survey	·	1.9 km	MPC · JPL
371279	2006 DP_{113}	—	February 27, 2006	Kitt Peak	Spacewatch	·	3.1 km	MPC · JPL
371280	2006 DO_{117}	—	February 27, 2006	Kitt Peak	Spacewatch	·	2.9 km	MPC · JPL
371281	2006 DQ_{131}	—	February 25, 2006	Kitt Peak	Spacewatch	·	2.1 km	MPC · JPL
371282	2006 DQ_{132}	—	February 25, 2006	Kitt Peak	Spacewatch	·	4.5 km	MPC · JPL
371283	2006 DX_{134}	—	February 25, 2006	Mount Lemmon	Mount Lemmon Survey	·	1.9 km	MPC · JPL
371284	2006 DF_{140}	—	February 25, 2006	Kitt Peak	Spacewatch	EMA	4.3 km	MPC · JPL
371285	2006 DD_{151}	—	February 25, 2006	Mount Lemmon	Mount Lemmon Survey	·	2.3 km	MPC · JPL
371286	2006 DU_{159}	—	February 27, 2006	Kitt Peak	Spacewatch	TEL	1.3 km	MPC · JPL
371287	2006 DC_{166}	—	February 2, 2006	Mount Lemmon	Mount Lemmon Survey	KOR	1.6 km	MPC · JPL
371288	2006 DX_{173}	—	February 27, 2006	Kitt Peak	Spacewatch	·	830 m	MPC · JPL
371289	2006 DK_{210}	—	February 20, 2006	Kitt Peak	Spacewatch	HYG	2.7 km	MPC · JPL
371290	2006 DE_{211}	—	February 24, 2006	Mount Lemmon	Mount Lemmon Survey	·	1.8 km	MPC · JPL
371291	2006 DP_{211}	—	October 18, 2003	Kitt Peak	Spacewatch	·	2.1 km	MPC · JPL
371292	2006 EE_{7}	—	March 2, 2006	Kitt Peak	Spacewatch	·	1.8 km	MPC · JPL
371293	2006 EV_{17}	—	March 2, 2006	Kitt Peak	Spacewatch	·	2.9 km	MPC · JPL
371294	2006 EO_{26}	—	March 3, 2006	Kitt Peak	Spacewatch	·	2.1 km	MPC · JPL
371295	2006 EQ_{42}	—	March 4, 2006	Kitt Peak	Spacewatch	EOS	1.7 km	MPC · JPL
371296	2006 EJ_{47}	—	March 4, 2006	Kitt Peak	Spacewatch	·	2.6 km	MPC · JPL
371297	2006 ES_{55}	—	March 5, 2006	Kitt Peak	Spacewatch	·	2.3 km	MPC · JPL
371298	2006 EB_{66}	—	March 5, 2006	Kitt Peak	Spacewatch	·	2.5 km	MPC · JPL
371299	2006 EM_{74}	—	March 3, 2006	Kitt Peak	Spacewatch	·	2.0 km	MPC · JPL
371300	2006 FB_{1}	—	March 21, 2006	Mount Lemmon	Mount Lemmon Survey	KOR	1.2 km	MPC · JPL

== 371301–371400 ==
back to top

Designation			Discovery			Properties		Ref
Permanent	Provisional	Named after	Date	Site	Discoverer(s)	Category	Diam.	Ref
371301	2006 FU_{3}	—	March 23, 2006	Kitt Peak	Spacewatch	·	2.6 km	MPC · JPL
371302	2006 FS_{4}	—	February 22, 2006	Catalina	CSS	·	3.6 km	MPC · JPL
371303	2006 FM_{10}	—	March 19, 2006	Socorro	LINEAR	·	2.7 km	MPC · JPL
371304	2006 FD_{13}	—	March 23, 2006	Kitt Peak	Spacewatch	·	2.8 km	MPC · JPL
371305	2006 FN_{17}	—	March 23, 2006	Kitt Peak	Spacewatch	·	620 m	MPC · JPL
371306	2006 FG_{26}	—	March 24, 2006	Mount Lemmon	Mount Lemmon Survey	·	3.4 km	MPC · JPL
371307	2006 FH_{38}	—	March 23, 2006	Kitt Peak	Spacewatch	·	2.9 km	MPC · JPL
371308	2006 FM_{42}	—	March 26, 2006	Mount Lemmon	Mount Lemmon Survey	·	2.8 km	MPC · JPL
371309	2006 GO_{9}	—	April 2, 2006	Kitt Peak	Spacewatch	·	3.3 km	MPC · JPL
371310	2006 GY_{27}	—	April 2, 2006	Kitt Peak	Spacewatch	THM	2.7 km	MPC · JPL
371311	2006 GN_{29}	—	April 2, 2006	Kitt Peak	Spacewatch	·	2.2 km	MPC · JPL
371312	2006 GV_{30}	—	April 2, 2006	Mount Lemmon	Mount Lemmon Survey	·	3.0 km	MPC · JPL
371313	2006 GX_{50}	—	April 2, 2006	Anderson Mesa	LONEOS	·	3.1 km	MPC · JPL
371314	2006 GZ_{51}	—	April 7, 2006	Siding Spring	SSS	EUP	4.1 km	MPC · JPL
371315	2006 HP_{10}	—	April 19, 2006	Kitt Peak	Spacewatch	·	1.9 km	MPC · JPL
371316	2006 HP_{14}	—	April 19, 2006	Mount Lemmon	Mount Lemmon Survey	THM	2.3 km	MPC · JPL
371317	2006 HS_{21}	—	April 20, 2006	Kitt Peak	Spacewatch	·	1.1 km	MPC · JPL
371318	2006 HU_{41}	—	April 21, 2006	Kitt Peak	Spacewatch	·	3.1 km	MPC · JPL
371319	2006 HE_{65}	—	April 24, 2006	Kitt Peak	Spacewatch	·	2.6 km	MPC · JPL
371320	2006 HF_{65}	—	April 24, 2006	Kitt Peak	Spacewatch	·	570 m	MPC · JPL
371321	2006 HF_{66}	—	April 24, 2006	Kitt Peak	Spacewatch	HYG	3.0 km	MPC · JPL
371322	2006 HC_{72}	—	April 25, 2006	Kitt Peak	Spacewatch	·	3.0 km	MPC · JPL
371323	2006 HM_{80}	—	April 26, 2006	Kitt Peak	Spacewatch	EOS	3.6 km	MPC · JPL
371324	2006 HK_{94}	—	April 29, 2006	Kitt Peak	Spacewatch	·	2.8 km	MPC · JPL
371325	2006 HU_{94}	—	April 30, 2006	Kitt Peak	Spacewatch	THM	2.3 km	MPC · JPL
371326	2006 JW_{3}	—	May 2, 2006	Mount Lemmon	Mount Lemmon Survey	·	3.2 km	MPC · JPL
371327	2006 JX_{3}	—	May 2, 2006	Mount Lemmon	Mount Lemmon Survey	·	4.0 km	MPC · JPL
371328	2006 JO_{7}	—	May 1, 2006	Kitt Peak	Spacewatch	·	540 m	MPC · JPL
371329	2006 JU_{14}	—	May 1, 2006	Kitt Peak	Spacewatch	·	2.9 km	MPC · JPL
371330	2006 JU_{16}	—	May 2, 2006	Kitt Peak	Spacewatch	·	2.5 km	MPC · JPL
371331	2006 JK_{21}	—	May 2, 2006	Kitt Peak	Spacewatch	·	650 m	MPC · JPL
371332	2006 JW_{28}	—	May 3, 2006	Kitt Peak	Spacewatch	·	730 m	MPC · JPL
371333	2006 JJ_{33}	—	May 3, 2006	Kitt Peak	Spacewatch	VER	3.6 km	MPC · JPL
371334	2006 JC_{59}	—	May 1, 2006	Kitt Peak	M. W. Buie	·	3.3 km	MPC · JPL
371335	2006 JS_{80}	—	May 9, 2006	Mount Lemmon	Mount Lemmon Survey	·	3.1 km	MPC · JPL
371336	2006 KD_{1}	—	May 20, 2006	Socorro	LINEAR	T_{j} (2.83) · APO +1km	1.1 km	MPC · JPL
371337	2006 KV_{2}	—	May 18, 2006	Palomar	NEAT	·	880 m	MPC · JPL
371338	2006 KY_{7}	—	May 19, 2006	Mount Lemmon	Mount Lemmon Survey	·	5.3 km	MPC · JPL
371339	2006 KG_{18}	—	May 21, 2006	Kitt Peak	Spacewatch	·	3.3 km	MPC · JPL
371340	2006 KL_{19}	—	May 21, 2006	Siding Spring	SSS	·	670 m	MPC · JPL
371341	2006 KX_{34}	—	May 20, 2006	Kitt Peak	Spacewatch	·	3.5 km	MPC · JPL
371342	2006 KT_{39}	—	May 21, 2006	Anderson Mesa	LONEOS	·	5.8 km	MPC · JPL
371343	2006 KY_{49}	—	May 21, 2006	Kitt Peak	Spacewatch	THM	2.6 km	MPC · JPL
371344	2006 KJ_{50}	—	May 21, 2006	Kitt Peak	Spacewatch	VER	3.2 km	MPC · JPL
371345	2006 KA_{51}	—	May 21, 2006	Kitt Peak	Spacewatch	·	2.7 km	MPC · JPL
371346	2006 KZ_{52}	—	May 21, 2006	Kitt Peak	Spacewatch	·	4.6 km	MPC · JPL
371347	2006 KL_{66}	—	May 24, 2006	Mount Lemmon	Mount Lemmon Survey	·	3.4 km	MPC · JPL
371348	2006 KB_{83}	—	May 20, 2006	Kitt Peak	Spacewatch	EOS	2.1 km	MPC · JPL
371349	2006 KB_{94}	—	May 25, 2006	Kitt Peak	Spacewatch	·	3.4 km	MPC · JPL
371350	2006 KG_{103}	—	May 30, 2006	Kitt Peak	Spacewatch	·	3.9 km	MPC · JPL
371351	2006 KW_{143}	—	May 23, 2006	Kitt Peak	Spacewatch	·	3.1 km	MPC · JPL
371352	2006 KZ_{144}	—	May 25, 2006	Kitt Peak	Spacewatch	·	3.0 km	MPC · JPL
371353	2006 LX	—	June 3, 2006	Mount Lemmon	Mount Lemmon Survey	·	620 m	MPC · JPL
371354	2006 LH_{1}	—	June 1, 2006	Kitt Peak	Spacewatch	·	660 m	MPC · JPL
371355	2006 MN_{1}	—	June 18, 2006	Kitt Peak	Spacewatch	·	4.5 km	MPC · JPL
371356	2006 MD_{2}	—	June 16, 2006	Kitt Peak	Spacewatch	·	3.8 km	MPC · JPL
371357	2006 MW_{14}	—	June 22, 2006	Palomar	NEAT	·	1.0 km	MPC · JPL
371358	2006 OJ	—	May 30, 2006	Mount Lemmon	Mount Lemmon Survey	·	850 m	MPC · JPL
371359	2006 OT_{8}	—	July 20, 2006	Palomar	NEAT	·	690 m	MPC · JPL
371360	2006 PK_{4}	—	August 15, 2006	Reedy Creek	J. Broughton	·	850 m	MPC · JPL
371361	2006 PF_{9}	—	July 18, 2006	Mount Lemmon	Mount Lemmon Survey	·	750 m	MPC · JPL
371362	2006 PO_{14}	—	August 15, 2006	Palomar	NEAT	·	1.1 km	MPC · JPL
371363	2006 PB_{15}	—	August 15, 2006	Palomar	NEAT	·	750 m	MPC · JPL
371364	2006 PA_{17}	—	August 15, 2006	Palomar	NEAT	V	940 m	MPC · JPL
371365	2006 PF_{21}	—	August 15, 2006	Palomar	NEAT	·	750 m	MPC · JPL
371366	2006 PH_{27}	—	July 31, 2006	Siding Spring	SSS	·	1.1 km	MPC · JPL
371367	2006 PM_{34}	—	August 15, 2006	Palomar	NEAT	·	860 m	MPC · JPL
371368	2006 QD_{1}	—	August 18, 2006	Piszkéstető	K. Sárneczky	·	1.1 km	MPC · JPL
371369	2006 QC_{29}	—	August 21, 2006	Kitt Peak	Spacewatch	·	910 m	MPC · JPL
371370	2006 QL_{40}	—	August 24, 2006	Socorro	LINEAR	V	710 m	MPC · JPL
371371	2006 QS_{47}	—	August 20, 2006	Kitt Peak	Spacewatch	·	980 m	MPC · JPL
371372	2006 QC_{51}	—	August 23, 2006	Socorro	LINEAR	·	970 m	MPC · JPL
371373	2006 QB_{61}	—	August 21, 2006	Socorro	LINEAR	·	770 m	MPC · JPL
371374	2006 QJ_{63}	—	August 24, 2006	Palomar	NEAT	·	770 m	MPC · JPL
371375	2006 QW_{79}	—	July 18, 2006	Mount Lemmon	Mount Lemmon Survey	·	880 m	MPC · JPL
371376	2006 QB_{99}	—	August 23, 2006	Socorro	LINEAR	·	630 m	MPC · JPL
371377	2006 QD_{108}	—	August 28, 2006	Catalina	CSS	NYS	690 m	MPC · JPL
371378	2006 QG_{114}	—	August 27, 2006	Anderson Mesa	LONEOS	·	770 m	MPC · JPL
371379	2006 QV_{116}	—	August 27, 2006	Anderson Mesa	LONEOS	·	910 m	MPC · JPL
371380	2006 QU_{122}	—	August 29, 2006	Catalina	CSS	slow	1.3 km	MPC · JPL
371381	2006 QP_{126}	—	August 16, 2006	Palomar	NEAT	·	790 m	MPC · JPL
371382	2006 QB_{145}	—	August 18, 2006	Kitt Peak	Spacewatch	·	1.1 km	MPC · JPL
371383	2006 QZ_{162}	—	August 21, 2006	Kitt Peak	Spacewatch	·	850 m	MPC · JPL
371384	2006 QF_{182}	—	August 27, 2006	Apache Point	A. C. Becker	·	950 m	MPC · JPL
371385	2006 QJ_{187}	—	August 18, 2006	Palomar	NEAT	·	810 m	MPC · JPL
371386	2006 RE	—	September 1, 2006	Ottmarsheim	C. Rinner	·	1.1 km	MPC · JPL
371387	2006 RQ_{8}	—	September 12, 2006	Catalina	CSS	V	670 m	MPC · JPL
371388	2006 RA_{9}	—	August 27, 2006	Kitt Peak	Spacewatch	·	700 m	MPC · JPL
371389	2006 RS_{10}	—	September 14, 2006	Palomar	NEAT	NYS	800 m	MPC · JPL
371390	2006 RD_{19}	—	July 21, 2006	Mount Lemmon	Mount Lemmon Survey	·	1.1 km	MPC · JPL
371391	2006 RH_{19}	—	September 14, 2006	Kitt Peak	Spacewatch	PHO	970 m	MPC · JPL
371392	2006 RO_{19}	—	September 14, 2006	Catalina	CSS	·	1.2 km	MPC · JPL
371393	2006 RW_{19}	—	September 15, 2006	Kitt Peak	Spacewatch	·	1.0 km	MPC · JPL
371394	2006 RH_{28}	—	September 15, 2006	Kitt Peak	Spacewatch	·	680 m	MPC · JPL
371395	2006 RB_{33}	—	September 15, 2006	Kitt Peak	Spacewatch	·	1.1 km	MPC · JPL
371396	2006 RR_{37}	—	September 12, 2006	Catalina	CSS	·	760 m	MPC · JPL
371397	2006 RA_{60}	—	September 15, 2006	Catalina	CSS	PHO	1.2 km	MPC · JPL
371398	2006 RP_{63}	—	September 14, 2006	Catalina	CSS	(2076)	910 m	MPC · JPL
371399	2006 RH_{71}	—	September 15, 2006	Kitt Peak	Spacewatch	·	500 m	MPC · JPL
371400	2006 RZ_{71}	—	September 15, 2006	Kitt Peak	Spacewatch	·	630 m	MPC · JPL

== 371401–371500 ==
back to top

Designation			Discovery			Properties		Ref
Permanent	Provisional	Named after	Date	Site	Discoverer(s)	Category	Diam.	Ref
371401	2006 RR_{73}	—	September 15, 2006	Kitt Peak	Spacewatch	NYS	1.0 km	MPC · JPL
371402	2006 RV_{73}	—	September 15, 2006	Kitt Peak	Spacewatch	·	1.1 km	MPC · JPL
371403	2006 RQ_{82}	—	September 15, 2006	Kitt Peak	Spacewatch	·	770 m	MPC · JPL
371404	2006 RU_{82}	—	September 15, 2006	Kitt Peak	Spacewatch	·	960 m	MPC · JPL
371405	2006 RN_{84}	—	September 15, 2006	Kitt Peak	Spacewatch	MAS	680 m	MPC · JPL
371406	2006 RM_{86}	—	September 15, 2006	Kitt Peak	Spacewatch	·	1.2 km	MPC · JPL
371407	2006 RP_{95}	—	September 15, 2006	Kitt Peak	Spacewatch	NYS	1.1 km	MPC · JPL
371408	2006 RV_{100}	—	September 14, 2006	Catalina	CSS	·	780 m	MPC · JPL
371409	2006 RU_{121}	—	September 15, 2006	Kitt Peak	Spacewatch	·	810 m	MPC · JPL
371410	2006 SU_{21}	—	September 17, 2006	Catalina	CSS	V	610 m	MPC · JPL
371411	2006 SF_{34}	—	September 17, 2006	Catalina	CSS	·	860 m	MPC · JPL
371412	2006 SA_{40}	—	September 18, 2006	Catalina	CSS	·	780 m	MPC · JPL
371413	2006 SW_{48}	—	September 18, 2006	Kitt Peak	Spacewatch	NYS	830 m	MPC · JPL
371414	2006 SZ_{48}	—	September 18, 2006	Kitt Peak	Spacewatch	·	910 m	MPC · JPL
371415	2006 SZ_{59}	—	September 18, 2006	Catalina	CSS	·	1.5 km	MPC · JPL
371416	2006 SM_{66}	—	September 19, 2006	Kitt Peak	Spacewatch	·	930 m	MPC · JPL
371417	2006 SE_{76}	—	September 19, 2006	Kitt Peak	Spacewatch	·	910 m	MPC · JPL
371418	2006 SJ_{80}	—	September 18, 2006	Kitt Peak	Spacewatch	·	1.2 km	MPC · JPL
371419	2006 SV_{85}	—	September 18, 2006	Kitt Peak	Spacewatch	V	610 m	MPC · JPL
371420	2006 SB_{94}	—	September 18, 2006	Kitt Peak	Spacewatch	·	980 m	MPC · JPL
371421	2006 SA_{103}	—	September 19, 2006	Kitt Peak	Spacewatch	·	770 m	MPC · JPL
371422	2006 SW_{104}	—	September 19, 2006	Kitt Peak	Spacewatch	·	1.1 km	MPC · JPL
371423	2006 SX_{105}	—	September 19, 2006	Kitt Peak	Spacewatch	·	1.0 km	MPC · JPL
371424	2006 SD_{110}	—	September 20, 2006	Socorro	LINEAR	·	930 m	MPC · JPL
371425	2006 SM_{115}	—	September 24, 2006	Kitt Peak	Spacewatch	·	1.0 km	MPC · JPL
371426	2006 SY_{117}	—	September 24, 2006	Kitt Peak	Spacewatch	·	640 m	MPC · JPL
371427	2006 SN_{141}	—	September 19, 2006	Catalina	CSS	·	960 m	MPC · JPL
371428	2006 ST_{150}	—	September 19, 2006	Kitt Peak	Spacewatch	·	910 m	MPC · JPL
371429	2006 SY_{157}	—	September 23, 2006	Kitt Peak	Spacewatch	V	650 m	MPC · JPL
371430	2006 SS_{163}	—	September 24, 2006	Kitt Peak	Spacewatch	·	850 m	MPC · JPL
371431	2006 SF_{175}	—	September 25, 2006	Mount Lemmon	Mount Lemmon Survey	·	860 m	MPC · JPL
371432	2006 SG_{185}	—	September 25, 2006	Mount Lemmon	Mount Lemmon Survey	·	1.1 km	MPC · JPL
371433	2006 SH_{192}	—	September 26, 2006	Mount Lemmon	Mount Lemmon Survey	·	1.1 km	MPC · JPL
371434	2006 SZ_{199}	—	September 24, 2006	Kitt Peak	Spacewatch	·	940 m	MPC · JPL
371435	2006 SG_{206}	—	September 25, 2006	Mount Lemmon	Mount Lemmon Survey	·	960 m	MPC · JPL
371436	2006 SW_{212}	—	September 26, 2006	Catalina	CSS	·	1.4 km	MPC · JPL
371437	2006 SJ_{215}	—	September 27, 2006	Kitt Peak	Spacewatch	·	1.0 km	MPC · JPL
371438	2006 SO_{221}	—	September 25, 2006	Mount Lemmon	Mount Lemmon Survey	·	910 m	MPC · JPL
371439	2006 ST_{239}	—	September 18, 2006	Kitt Peak	Spacewatch	·	860 m	MPC · JPL
371440	2006 SJ_{240}	—	September 26, 2006	Kitt Peak	Spacewatch	·	940 m	MPC · JPL
371441	2006 SM_{258}	—	September 19, 2006	Kitt Peak	Spacewatch	·	1.1 km	MPC · JPL
371442	2006 SW_{272}	—	September 27, 2006	Mount Lemmon	Mount Lemmon Survey	·	2.2 km	MPC · JPL
371443	2006 SB_{274}	—	September 27, 2006	Mount Lemmon	Mount Lemmon Survey	NYS	900 m	MPC · JPL
371444	2006 SG_{279}	—	September 28, 2006	Mount Lemmon	Mount Lemmon Survey	·	1.2 km	MPC · JPL
371445	2006 SM_{285}	—	September 24, 2006	Kitt Peak	Spacewatch	·	1.8 km	MPC · JPL
371446	2006 SY_{287}	—	September 25, 2006	Socorro	LINEAR	·	1.0 km	MPC · JPL
371447	2006 SJ_{290}	—	September 30, 2006	Catalina	CSS	·	1.0 km	MPC · JPL
371448	2006 SU_{296}	—	September 25, 2006	Kitt Peak	Spacewatch	V	660 m	MPC · JPL
371449	2006 SM_{300}	—	September 26, 2006	Catalina	CSS	·	880 m	MPC · JPL
371450	2006 SO_{316}	—	September 27, 2006	Kitt Peak	Spacewatch	·	690 m	MPC · JPL
371451	2006 SV_{316}	—	September 27, 2006	Kitt Peak	Spacewatch	NYS	830 m	MPC · JPL
371452	2006 SB_{317}	—	September 27, 2006	Kitt Peak	Spacewatch	NYS	780 m	MPC · JPL
371453	2006 SL_{317}	—	September 27, 2006	Kitt Peak	Spacewatch	·	880 m	MPC · JPL
371454	2006 SZ_{322}	—	September 27, 2006	Kitt Peak	Spacewatch	·	1.3 km	MPC · JPL
371455	2006 SQ_{332}	—	September 28, 2006	Mount Lemmon	Mount Lemmon Survey	NYS	1.1 km	MPC · JPL
371456	2006 SY_{346}	—	September 15, 2006	Kitt Peak	Spacewatch	NYS	1.1 km	MPC · JPL
371457	2006 SG_{348}	—	September 28, 2006	Kitt Peak	Spacewatch	·	1.1 km	MPC · JPL
371458	2006 SR_{355}	—	September 30, 2006	Catalina	CSS	NYS	1.3 km	MPC · JPL
371459	2006 SH_{361}	—	September 30, 2006	Mount Lemmon	Mount Lemmon Survey	·	1.0 km	MPC · JPL
371460	2006 SO_{361}	—	September 30, 2006	Mount Lemmon	Mount Lemmon Survey	NYS	1.1 km	MPC · JPL
371461	2006 SR_{364}	—	September 28, 2006	Mount Lemmon	Mount Lemmon Survey	·	1.2 km	MPC · JPL
371462	2006 SW_{367}	—	September 28, 2006	Catalina	CSS	·	1.6 km	MPC · JPL
371463	2006 SB_{391}	—	September 17, 2006	Kitt Peak	Spacewatch	·	930 m	MPC · JPL
371464	2006 SG_{393}	—	September 28, 2006	Catalina	CSS	·	820 m	MPC · JPL
371465	2006 SE_{397}	—	September 19, 2006	Kitt Peak	Spacewatch	·	700 m	MPC · JPL
371466	2006 SN_{406}	—	September 17, 2006	Kitt Peak	Spacewatch	·	870 m	MPC · JPL
371467	2006 SF_{409}	—	September 30, 2006	Catalina	CSS	·	1.0 km	MPC · JPL
371468	2006 TF_{4}	—	October 2, 2006	Mount Lemmon	Mount Lemmon Survey	·	1.1 km	MPC · JPL
371469	2006 TS_{6}	—	October 3, 2006	Mount Lemmon	Mount Lemmon Survey	NYS	1.1 km	MPC · JPL
371470	2006 TL_{9}	—	October 11, 2006	Kitt Peak	Spacewatch	MAS	710 m	MPC · JPL
371471	2006 TE_{14}	—	October 10, 2006	Palomar	NEAT	·	1.1 km	MPC · JPL
371472	2006 TP_{17}	—	October 11, 2006	Kitt Peak	Spacewatch	·	950 m	MPC · JPL
371473	2006 TG_{18}	—	October 11, 2006	Kitt Peak	Spacewatch	NYS	1.0 km	MPC · JPL
371474	2006 TL_{21}	—	October 11, 2006	Kitt Peak	Spacewatch	·	1.3 km	MPC · JPL
371475	2006 TM_{27}	—	October 12, 2006	Kitt Peak	Spacewatch	·	1.2 km	MPC · JPL
371476	2006 TE_{28}	—	October 12, 2006	Kitt Peak	Spacewatch	·	1.1 km	MPC · JPL
371477	2006 TR_{30}	—	October 12, 2006	Kitt Peak	Spacewatch	·	960 m	MPC · JPL
371478	2006 TB_{33}	—	October 12, 2006	Kitt Peak	Spacewatch	V	790 m	MPC · JPL
371479	2006 TY_{35}	—	October 12, 2006	Kitt Peak	Spacewatch	NYS	1.0 km	MPC · JPL
371480	2006 TK_{36}	—	October 12, 2006	Kitt Peak	Spacewatch	NYS	1.1 km	MPC · JPL
371481	2006 TX_{39}	—	October 12, 2006	Kitt Peak	Spacewatch	·	940 m	MPC · JPL
371482	2006 TY_{39}	—	October 12, 2006	Kitt Peak	Spacewatch	MAS	640 m	MPC · JPL
371483	2006 TQ_{46}	—	October 12, 2006	Kitt Peak	Spacewatch	·	970 m	MPC · JPL
371484	2006 TG_{53}	—	September 30, 2006	Mount Lemmon	Mount Lemmon Survey	·	760 m	MPC · JPL
371485	2006 TM_{66}	—	September 18, 2006	Kitt Peak	Spacewatch	·	750 m	MPC · JPL
371486	2006 TT_{66}	—	October 11, 2006	Palomar	NEAT	·	1.1 km	MPC · JPL
371487	2006 TY_{66}	—	October 11, 2006	Palomar	NEAT	·	1.1 km	MPC · JPL
371488	2006 TN_{72}	—	October 11, 2006	Palomar	NEAT	·	1.1 km	MPC · JPL
371489	2006 TV_{73}	—	September 30, 2006	Catalina	CSS	·	1.2 km	MPC · JPL
371490	2006 TB_{92}	—	October 13, 2006	Kitt Peak	Spacewatch	·	1.7 km	MPC · JPL
371491	2006 TW_{92}	—	October 15, 2006	Kitt Peak	Spacewatch	·	910 m	MPC · JPL
371492	2006 TT_{93}	—	October 15, 2006	Kitt Peak	Spacewatch	NYS	1.2 km	MPC · JPL
371493	2006 TR_{94}	—	October 15, 2006	Lulin	Lin, C.-S., Q. Ye	·	1.2 km	MPC · JPL
371494	2006 TJ_{102}	—	October 15, 2006	Kitt Peak	Spacewatch	·	770 m	MPC · JPL
371495	2006 TG_{110}	—	October 13, 2006	Kitt Peak	Spacewatch	·	1.2 km	MPC · JPL
371496	2006 UA_{16}	—	October 17, 2006	Mount Lemmon	Mount Lemmon Survey	·	1.0 km	MPC · JPL
371497	2006 UG_{25}	—	September 26, 2006	Mount Lemmon	Mount Lemmon Survey	·	1.3 km	MPC · JPL
371498	2006 UV_{26}	—	October 16, 2006	Kitt Peak	Spacewatch	·	940 m	MPC · JPL
371499	2006 UA_{36}	—	October 16, 2006	Kitt Peak	Spacewatch	·	860 m	MPC · JPL
371500	2006 UH_{36}	—	October 16, 2006	Kitt Peak	Spacewatch	NYS	1.4 km	MPC · JPL

== 371501–371600 ==
back to top

Designation			Discovery			Properties		Ref
Permanent	Provisional	Named after	Date	Site	Discoverer(s)	Category	Diam.	Ref
371501	2006 UP_{39}	—	October 16, 2006	Kitt Peak	Spacewatch	NYS	940 m	MPC · JPL
371502	2006 UK_{41}	—	October 16, 2006	Kitt Peak	Spacewatch	·	1.4 km	MPC · JPL
371503	2006 UP_{45}	—	October 16, 2006	Kitt Peak	Spacewatch	MAS	710 m	MPC · JPL
371504	2006 UE_{46}	—	October 16, 2006	Kitt Peak	Spacewatch	·	1.3 km	MPC · JPL
371505	2006 UN_{63}	—	October 21, 2006	7300	W. K. Y. Yeung	·	1.1 km	MPC · JPL
371506	2006 UT_{68}	—	October 16, 2006	Catalina	CSS	·	1.1 km	MPC · JPL
371507	2006 UL_{70}	—	October 16, 2006	Kitt Peak	Spacewatch	·	1.5 km	MPC · JPL
371508	2006 UQ_{74}	—	October 17, 2006	Kitt Peak	Spacewatch	·	790 m	MPC · JPL
371509	2006 UV_{74}	—	October 17, 2006	Kitt Peak	Spacewatch	·	1.1 km	MPC · JPL
371510	2006 UX_{74}	—	September 25, 2006	Kitt Peak	Spacewatch	·	1.2 km	MPC · JPL
371511	2006 UU_{75}	—	October 17, 2006	Mount Lemmon	Mount Lemmon Survey	V	610 m	MPC · JPL
371512	2006 UY_{77}	—	October 17, 2006	Kitt Peak	Spacewatch	·	1.1 km	MPC · JPL
371513	2006 UP_{82}	—	October 17, 2006	Kitt Peak	Spacewatch	·	1.4 km	MPC · JPL
371514	2006 UO_{88}	—	October 17, 2006	Kitt Peak	Spacewatch	·	1.0 km	MPC · JPL
371515	2006 UF_{94}	—	October 2, 2006	Mount Lemmon	Mount Lemmon Survey	MAS	800 m	MPC · JPL
371516	2006 UM_{123}	—	October 19, 2006	Palomar	NEAT	·	860 m	MPC · JPL
371517	2006 UK_{144}	—	October 19, 2006	Kitt Peak	Spacewatch	·	1.0 km	MPC · JPL
371518	2006 UN_{155}	—	September 17, 2006	Kitt Peak	Spacewatch	NYS	940 m	MPC · JPL
371519	2006 UQ_{166}	—	October 21, 2006	Mount Lemmon	Mount Lemmon Survey	·	880 m	MPC · JPL
371520	2006 UY_{169}	—	October 21, 2006	Mount Lemmon	Mount Lemmon Survey	·	1.4 km	MPC · JPL
371521	2006 UK_{178}	—	October 16, 2006	Catalina	CSS	·	1.4 km	MPC · JPL
371522	2006 UG_{185}	—	October 27, 2006	Mount Lemmon	Mount Lemmon Survey	T_{j} (2.87)	8.8 km	MPC · JPL
371523	2006 UJ_{191}	—	October 19, 2006	Catalina	CSS	·	920 m	MPC · JPL
371524	2006 UX_{196}	—	October 20, 2006	Kitt Peak	Spacewatch	·	1.2 km	MPC · JPL
371525	2006 UR_{198}	—	October 20, 2006	Kitt Peak	Spacewatch	MAS	500 m	MPC · JPL
371526	2006 UV_{213}	—	October 23, 2006	Kitt Peak	Spacewatch	·	1.2 km	MPC · JPL
371527	2006 UB_{216}	—	October 28, 2006	Calvin-Rehoboth	L. A. Molnar	·	1.2 km	MPC · JPL
371528	2006 UC_{220}	—	October 16, 2006	Catalina	CSS	·	1.1 km	MPC · JPL
371529	2006 UQ_{221}	—	October 17, 2006	Kitt Peak	Spacewatch	·	1.2 km	MPC · JPL
371530	2006 UZ_{224}	—	February 29, 2004	Kitt Peak	Spacewatch	·	910 m	MPC · JPL
371531	2006 UC_{225}	—	October 19, 2006	Catalina	CSS	·	1.1 km	MPC · JPL
371532	2006 UY_{234}	—	October 22, 2006	Mount Lemmon	Mount Lemmon Survey	·	1.7 km	MPC · JPL
371533	2006 UM_{240}	—	October 23, 2006	Kitt Peak	Spacewatch	3:2 · SHU	4.5 km	MPC · JPL
371534	2006 UB_{247}	—	September 26, 2006	Mount Lemmon	Mount Lemmon Survey	NYS	1.2 km	MPC · JPL
371535	2006 UC_{250}	—	October 27, 2006	Mount Lemmon	Mount Lemmon Survey	NYS	1.1 km	MPC · JPL
371536	2006 UZ_{265}	—	October 27, 2006	Catalina	CSS	·	1.1 km	MPC · JPL
371537	2006 UF_{266}	—	October 4, 2006	Mount Lemmon	Mount Lemmon Survey	MAS	680 m	MPC · JPL
371538	2006 UD_{274}	—	October 27, 2006	Kitt Peak	Spacewatch	NYS	1.2 km	MPC · JPL
371539	2006 UR_{274}	—	October 28, 2006	Kitt Peak	Spacewatch	NYS	1.1 km	MPC · JPL
371540	2006 UZ_{285}	—	October 28, 2006	Kitt Peak	Spacewatch	MAS	680 m	MPC · JPL
371541	2006 UB_{290}	—	October 31, 2006	Kitt Peak	Spacewatch	·	1.0 km	MPC · JPL
371542	2006 UK_{291}	—	October 30, 2006	Catalina	CSS	·	1.5 km	MPC · JPL
371543	2006 UV_{291}	—	October 24, 2006	Cordell-Lorenz	Cordell-Lorenz	MAS	730 m	MPC · JPL
371544	2006 UT_{302}	—	September 14, 2006	Catalina	CSS	·	820 m	MPC · JPL
371545	2006 UK_{304}	—	October 19, 2006	Kitt Peak	M. W. Buie	·	640 m	MPC · JPL
371546	2006 UL_{331}	—	October 19, 2006	Catalina	CSS	V	820 m	MPC · JPL
371547	2006 UO_{337}	—	October 16, 2006	Kitt Peak	Spacewatch	NYS	890 m	MPC · JPL
371548	2006 UY_{349}	—	October 26, 2006	Mauna Kea	P. A. Wiegert	3:2	5.2 km	MPC · JPL
371549	2006 VF_{2}	—	November 2, 2006	Mount Lemmon	Mount Lemmon Survey	·	1.4 km	MPC · JPL
371550	2006 VC_{10}	—	November 11, 2006	Mount Lemmon	Mount Lemmon Survey	MAS	800 m	MPC · JPL
371551	2006 VC_{16}	—	November 9, 2006	Kitt Peak	Spacewatch	·	1.2 km	MPC · JPL
371552	2006 VT_{16}	—	November 9, 2006	Kitt Peak	Spacewatch	NYS	1.2 km	MPC · JPL
371553	2006 VP_{25}	—	November 10, 2006	Kitt Peak	Spacewatch	·	1.1 km	MPC · JPL
371554	2006 VL_{29}	—	November 10, 2006	Kitt Peak	Spacewatch	NYS	1.1 km	MPC · JPL
371555	2006 VX_{29}	—	November 10, 2006	Kitt Peak	Spacewatch	·	1.5 km	MPC · JPL
371556	2006 VK_{30}	—	November 10, 2006	Kitt Peak	Spacewatch	·	1.0 km	MPC · JPL
371557	2006 VO_{30}	—	November 10, 2006	Kitt Peak	Spacewatch	·	1.0 km	MPC · JPL
371558	2006 VQ_{30}	—	November 10, 2006	Kitt Peak	Spacewatch	·	920 m	MPC · JPL
371559	2006 VV_{38}	—	November 12, 2006	Mount Lemmon	Mount Lemmon Survey	CLA	1.5 km	MPC · JPL
371560	2006 VK_{52}	—	November 11, 2006	Kitt Peak	Spacewatch	·	1.4 km	MPC · JPL
371561	2006 VK_{57}	—	November 11, 2006	Kitt Peak	Spacewatch	NYS	1.1 km	MPC · JPL
371562	2006 VF_{58}	—	November 11, 2006	Kitt Peak	Spacewatch	·	1.2 km	MPC · JPL
371563	2006 VF_{64}	—	November 11, 2006	Kitt Peak	Spacewatch	·	1.4 km	MPC · JPL
371564	2006 VL_{66}	—	November 11, 2006	Catalina	CSS	·	1.1 km	MPC · JPL
371565	2006 VO_{68}	—	November 11, 2006	Catalina	CSS	MAS	770 m	MPC · JPL
371566	2006 VX_{70}	—	November 11, 2006	Kitt Peak	Spacewatch	·	1.6 km	MPC · JPL
371567	2006 VE_{72}	—	November 11, 2006	Mount Lemmon	Mount Lemmon Survey	MAS	640 m	MPC · JPL
371568	2006 VC_{95}	—	November 15, 2006	Ottmarsheim	C. Rinner	NYS	960 m	MPC · JPL
371569	2006 VE_{98}	—	October 22, 2006	Mount Lemmon	Mount Lemmon Survey	·	1.3 km	MPC · JPL
371570	2006 VF_{104}	—	November 13, 2006	Palomar	NEAT	NYS	1.4 km	MPC · JPL
371571	2006 VR_{104}	—	November 13, 2006	Catalina	CSS	·	1.2 km	MPC · JPL
371572	2006 VH_{107}	—	November 13, 2006	Kitt Peak	Spacewatch	·	1.2 km	MPC · JPL
371573	2006 VF_{115}	—	November 14, 2006	Kitt Peak	Spacewatch	MAS	790 m	MPC · JPL
371574	2006 VR_{130}	—	November 15, 2006	Kitt Peak	Spacewatch	MAS	640 m	MPC · JPL
371575	2006 VS_{130}	—	November 15, 2006	Kitt Peak	Spacewatch	·	1.1 km	MPC · JPL
371576	2006 VJ_{133}	—	November 15, 2006	Kitt Peak	Spacewatch	·	1.3 km	MPC · JPL
371577	2006 VY_{140}	—	November 15, 2006	Kitt Peak	Spacewatch	MAS	840 m	MPC · JPL
371578	2006 VU_{142}	—	November 14, 2006	Kitt Peak	Spacewatch	·	960 m	MPC · JPL
371579	2006 VF_{143}	—	November 14, 2006	Kitt Peak	Spacewatch	·	1.2 km	MPC · JPL
371580	2006 VM_{151}	—	September 25, 2006	Mount Lemmon	Mount Lemmon Survey	NYS	930 m	MPC · JPL
371581	2006 VP_{154}	—	October 3, 2006	Mount Lemmon	Mount Lemmon Survey	·	940 m	MPC · JPL
371582	2006 VN_{170}	—	November 15, 2006	Kitt Peak	Spacewatch	MAS	570 m	MPC · JPL
371583	2006 VY_{172}	—	November 1, 2006	Mount Lemmon	Mount Lemmon Survey	·	1.5 km	MPC · JPL
371584	2006 WH_{4}	—	November 19, 2006	Kitt Peak	Spacewatch	NYS	1.1 km	MPC · JPL
371585	2006 WO_{7}	—	November 16, 2006	Kitt Peak	Spacewatch	·	1.2 km	MPC · JPL
371586	2006 WW_{24}	—	November 17, 2006	Mount Lemmon	Mount Lemmon Survey	·	910 m	MPC · JPL
371587	2006 WD_{29}	—	November 19, 2006	Kitt Peak	Spacewatch	·	1.4 km	MPC · JPL
371588	2006 WC_{41}	—	November 16, 2006	Kitt Peak	Spacewatch	·	910 m	MPC · JPL
371589	2006 WN_{42}	—	November 16, 2006	Kitt Peak	Spacewatch	·	1.3 km	MPC · JPL
371590	2006 WB_{47}	—	November 16, 2006	Kitt Peak	Spacewatch	·	820 m	MPC · JPL
371591	2006 WQ_{49}	—	November 2, 2006	Mount Lemmon	Mount Lemmon Survey	·	1.3 km	MPC · JPL
371592	2006 WH_{52}	—	November 16, 2006	Kitt Peak	Spacewatch	·	860 m	MPC · JPL
371593	2006 WB_{90}	—	November 18, 2006	Kitt Peak	Spacewatch	·	1.2 km	MPC · JPL
371594	2006 WQ_{98}	—	November 19, 2006	Kitt Peak	Spacewatch	·	1.1 km	MPC · JPL
371595	2006 WA_{101}	—	November 19, 2006	Socorro	LINEAR	MAS	770 m	MPC · JPL
371596	2006 WL_{110}	—	November 11, 2006	Kitt Peak	Spacewatch	MAS	660 m	MPC · JPL
371597	2006 WE_{118}	—	November 11, 2006	Kitt Peak	Spacewatch	NYS	1.3 km	MPC · JPL
371598	2006 WF_{125}	—	November 22, 2006	Kitt Peak	Spacewatch	·	1.5 km	MPC · JPL
371599	2006 WG_{125}	—	November 22, 2006	Socorro	LINEAR	·	1.5 km	MPC · JPL
371600	2006 WK_{143}	—	October 23, 2006	Mount Lemmon	Mount Lemmon Survey	MAS	830 m	MPC · JPL

== 371601–371700 ==
back to top

Designation			Discovery			Properties		Ref
Permanent	Provisional	Named after	Date	Site	Discoverer(s)	Category	Diam.	Ref
371601	2006 WB_{146}	—	November 20, 2006	Kitt Peak	Spacewatch	·	1.0 km	MPC · JPL
371602	2006 WO_{146}	—	October 28, 2006	Mount Lemmon	Mount Lemmon Survey	·	880 m	MPC · JPL
371603	2006 WQ_{146}	—	November 20, 2006	Kitt Peak	Spacewatch	NYS	1.2 km	MPC · JPL
371604	2006 WY_{152}	—	October 23, 2006	Mount Lemmon	Mount Lemmon Survey	·	1.4 km	MPC · JPL
371605	2006 WZ_{161}	—	November 23, 2006	Kitt Peak	Spacewatch	MAS	650 m	MPC · JPL
371606	2006 WW_{174}	—	November 23, 2006	Kitt Peak	Spacewatch	MAS	600 m	MPC · JPL
371607	2006 WA_{182}	—	November 24, 2006	Mount Lemmon	Mount Lemmon Survey	·	1.1 km	MPC · JPL
371608	2006 XD_{6}	—	December 8, 2006	Palomar	NEAT	·	1.1 km	MPC · JPL
371609	2006 XQ_{9}	—	December 9, 2006	Kitt Peak	Spacewatch	·	1.7 km	MPC · JPL
371610	2006 XC_{13}	—	December 10, 2006	Kitt Peak	Spacewatch	·	1.5 km	MPC · JPL
371611	2006 XN_{19}	—	December 11, 2006	Kitt Peak	Spacewatch	MAS	860 m	MPC · JPL
371612	2006 XL_{26}	—	December 12, 2006	Catalina	CSS	·	1.2 km	MPC · JPL
371613	2006 XC_{40}	—	December 12, 2006	Mount Lemmon	Mount Lemmon Survey	MAS	730 m	MPC · JPL
371614	2006 XG_{41}	—	December 12, 2006	Mount Lemmon	Mount Lemmon Survey	·	1.4 km	MPC · JPL
371615	2006 XW_{41}	—	November 14, 2006	Mount Lemmon	Mount Lemmon Survey	NYS	1.3 km	MPC · JPL
371616	2006 XS_{57}	—	December 14, 2006	Mount Lemmon	Mount Lemmon Survey	·	1.6 km	MPC · JPL
371617	2006 XP_{60}	—	December 14, 2006	Kitt Peak	Spacewatch	·	1.4 km	MPC · JPL
371618	2006 XY_{62}	—	December 15, 2006	Mount Lemmon	Mount Lemmon Survey	·	1.3 km	MPC · JPL
371619	2006 XU_{70}	—	December 13, 2006	Mount Lemmon	Mount Lemmon Survey	·	1.3 km	MPC · JPL
371620	2006 YB_{18}	—	December 22, 2006	Socorro	LINEAR	·	1.5 km	MPC · JPL
371621	2006 YL_{29}	—	December 21, 2006	Kitt Peak	Spacewatch	·	1.2 km	MPC · JPL
371622	2006 YA_{30}	—	December 21, 2006	Kitt Peak	Spacewatch	·	1.8 km	MPC · JPL
371623	2006 YQ_{34}	—	December 21, 2006	Kitt Peak	Spacewatch	·	1.2 km	MPC · JPL
371624	2006 YB_{36}	—	December 21, 2006	Kitt Peak	Spacewatch	·	1.1 km	MPC · JPL
371625	2006 YB_{41}	—	December 22, 2006	Kitt Peak	Spacewatch	·	1.4 km	MPC · JPL
371626	2006 YM_{50}	—	December 21, 2006	Kitt Peak	M. W. Buie	NYS	1.1 km	MPC · JPL
371627	2007 AP_{7}	—	January 9, 2007	Mount Lemmon	Mount Lemmon Survey	·	890 m	MPC · JPL
371628	2007 AF_{8}	—	January 10, 2007	Mount Nyukasa	Japan Aerospace Exploration Agency	·	1.2 km	MPC · JPL
371629	2007 AQ_{8}	—	November 18, 2006	Mount Lemmon	Mount Lemmon Survey	NYS	1.1 km	MPC · JPL
371630	2007 AK_{10}	—	January 9, 2007	Kitt Peak	Spacewatch	·	1.7 km	MPC · JPL
371631	2007 AB_{15}	—	January 10, 2007	Mount Lemmon	Mount Lemmon Survey	·	1.2 km	MPC · JPL
371632	2007 AE_{15}	—	January 10, 2007	Mount Lemmon	Mount Lemmon Survey	NYS	1.3 km	MPC · JPL
371633	2007 AY_{18}	—	January 13, 2007	Socorro	LINEAR	·	1.5 km	MPC · JPL
371634	2007 AJ_{19}	—	January 15, 2007	Anderson Mesa	LONEOS	NYS	1.6 km	MPC · JPL
371635	2007 BC_{2}	—	January 16, 2007	Catalina	CSS	·	1.7 km	MPC · JPL
371636	2007 BL_{6}	—	January 17, 2007	Palomar	NEAT	·	1.6 km	MPC · JPL
371637	2007 BG_{8}	—	January 24, 2007	Mount Lemmon	Mount Lemmon Survey	·	1.5 km	MPC · JPL
371638	2007 BR_{10}	—	January 17, 2007	Kitt Peak	Spacewatch	·	1.5 km	MPC · JPL
371639	2007 BW_{17}	—	January 8, 2007	Kitt Peak	Spacewatch	RAF	1.0 km	MPC · JPL
371640	2007 BW_{20}	—	January 18, 2007	Palomar	NEAT	·	1.7 km	MPC · JPL
371641	2007 BZ_{26}	—	January 24, 2007	Catalina	CSS	·	1.4 km	MPC · JPL
371642	2007 BM_{27}	—	January 24, 2007	Catalina	CSS	·	1.4 km	MPC · JPL
371643	2007 BL_{34}	—	January 24, 2007	Mount Lemmon	Mount Lemmon Survey	·	1.3 km	MPC · JPL
371644	2007 BX_{42}	—	January 24, 2007	Mount Lemmon	Mount Lemmon Survey	·	1.3 km	MPC · JPL
371645	2007 BL_{45}	—	September 27, 1994	Kitt Peak	Spacewatch	·	1.2 km	MPC · JPL
371646	2007 BS_{54}	—	January 24, 2007	Socorro	LINEAR	·	2.0 km	MPC · JPL
371647	2007 BS_{55}	—	January 24, 2007	Socorro	LINEAR	·	1.8 km	MPC · JPL
371648	2007 BT_{63}	—	January 10, 2007	Mount Lemmon	Mount Lemmon Survey	·	1.7 km	MPC · JPL
371649	2007 BT_{64}	—	January 27, 2007	Mount Lemmon	Mount Lemmon Survey	·	1.2 km	MPC · JPL
371650	2007 BH_{67}	—	January 27, 2007	Mount Lemmon	Mount Lemmon Survey	(5)	1.0 km	MPC · JPL
371651	2007 BW_{74}	—	January 27, 2007	Kitt Peak	Spacewatch	·	1.2 km	MPC · JPL
371652	2007 BV_{75}	—	January 26, 2007	Kitt Peak	Spacewatch	NYS	1.2 km	MPC · JPL
371653	2007 BZ_{77}	—	January 27, 2007	Mount Lemmon	Mount Lemmon Survey	·	2.1 km	MPC · JPL
371654	2007 BK_{92}	—	January 19, 2007	Mauna Kea	Mauna Kea	·	1.2 km	MPC · JPL
371655	2007 BX_{99}	—	January 17, 2007	Kitt Peak	Spacewatch	·	1.1 km	MPC · JPL
371656	2007 CH_{1}	—	February 6, 2007	Kitt Peak	Spacewatch	·	1.6 km	MPC · JPL
371657	2007 CZ_{1}	—	February 6, 2007	Kitt Peak	Spacewatch	·	2.8 km	MPC · JPL
371658	2007 CA_{2}	—	January 17, 2007	Mount Lemmon	Mount Lemmon Survey	·	2.0 km	MPC · JPL
371659	2007 CG_{3}	—	January 24, 2007	Catalina	CSS	HNS	1.2 km	MPC · JPL
371660	2007 CN_{26}	—	February 10, 2007	Mount Lemmon	Mount Lemmon Survey	APO · PHA	230 m	MPC · JPL
371661	2007 CZ_{34}	—	February 6, 2007	Palomar	NEAT	BRG	1.3 km	MPC · JPL
371662	2007 CA_{37}	—	February 6, 2007	Mount Lemmon	Mount Lemmon Survey	AEO	1.4 km	MPC · JPL
371663	2007 CD_{40}	—	January 10, 2007	Mount Lemmon	Mount Lemmon Survey	·	1.5 km	MPC · JPL
371664	2007 CP_{41}	—	February 7, 2007	Kitt Peak	Spacewatch	·	2.2 km	MPC · JPL
371665	2007 CL_{47}	—	February 9, 2007	Kitt Peak	Spacewatch	·	1.8 km	MPC · JPL
371666	2007 CX_{49}	—	February 10, 2007	Mount Lemmon	Mount Lemmon Survey	MAR	1.2 km	MPC · JPL
371667	2007 CH_{51}	—	February 7, 2007	Catalina	CSS	·	1.3 km	MPC · JPL
371668	2007 CO_{52}	—	February 10, 2007	Catalina	CSS	·	2.4 km	MPC · JPL
371669	2007 CC_{56}	—	February 13, 2007	Socorro	LINEAR	·	1.7 km	MPC · JPL
371670	2007 CS_{57}	—	November 21, 2006	Mount Lemmon	Mount Lemmon Survey	MAR	1.4 km	MPC · JPL
371671	2007 CY_{59}	—	February 10, 2007	Catalina	CSS	·	1.8 km	MPC · JPL
371672	2007 CS_{63}	—	February 15, 2007	Catalina	CSS	EUN	1.6 km	MPC · JPL
371673	2007 DY_{10}	—	February 17, 2007	Kitt Peak	Spacewatch	·	2.2 km	MPC · JPL
371674	2007 DR_{11}	—	February 16, 2007	Palomar	NEAT	·	1.1 km	MPC · JPL
371675	2007 DV_{11}	—	February 16, 2007	Mount Lemmon	Mount Lemmon Survey	H	540 m	MPC · JPL
371676	2007 DU_{12}	—	February 16, 2007	Palomar	NEAT	·	2.3 km	MPC · JPL
371677	2007 DC_{13}	—	February 16, 2007	Palomar	NEAT	·	1.2 km	MPC · JPL
371678	2007 DO_{13}	—	January 27, 2007	Mount Lemmon	Mount Lemmon Survey	·	2.6 km	MPC · JPL
371679	2007 DF_{15}	—	February 17, 2007	Kitt Peak	Spacewatch	·	1.9 km	MPC · JPL
371680	2007 DG_{29}	—	February 17, 2007	Palomar	NEAT	·	1.9 km	MPC · JPL
371681	2007 DN_{29}	—	January 27, 2007	Mount Lemmon	Mount Lemmon Survey	·	1.1 km	MPC · JPL
371682	2007 DE_{30}	—	February 17, 2007	Kitt Peak	Spacewatch	L5	9.9 km	MPC · JPL
371683	2007 DP_{33}	—	February 17, 2007	Kitt Peak	Spacewatch	·	1.7 km	MPC · JPL
371684	2007 DT_{36}	—	February 17, 2007	Kitt Peak	Spacewatch	EUN	980 m	MPC · JPL
371685	2007 DK_{38}	—	February 17, 2007	Kitt Peak	Spacewatch	·	970 m	MPC · JPL
371686	2007 DB_{42}	—	February 16, 2007	Catalina	CSS	·	2.8 km	MPC · JPL
371687	2007 DF_{53}	—	February 19, 2007	Mount Lemmon	Mount Lemmon Survey	·	1.7 km	MPC · JPL
371688	2007 DQ_{56}	—	February 21, 2007	Mount Lemmon	Mount Lemmon Survey	·	930 m	MPC · JPL
371689	2007 DT_{57}	—	February 21, 2007	Mount Lemmon	Mount Lemmon Survey	·	1.6 km	MPC · JPL
371690	2007 DV_{57}	—	February 21, 2007	Mount Lemmon	Mount Lemmon Survey	·	850 m	MPC · JPL
371691	2007 DD_{59}	—	February 22, 2007	Kitt Peak	Spacewatch	·	1.4 km	MPC · JPL
371692	2007 DZ_{59}	—	February 22, 2007	Anderson Mesa	LONEOS	H	620 m	MPC · JPL
371693	2007 DU_{68}	—	February 21, 2007	Kitt Peak	Spacewatch	·	1.9 km	MPC · JPL
371694	2007 DM_{85}	—	February 21, 2007	Socorro	LINEAR	EUN	1.6 km	MPC · JPL
371695	2007 DY_{85}	—	January 28, 2007	Mount Lemmon	Mount Lemmon Survey	·	2.1 km	MPC · JPL
371696	2007 DJ_{90}	—	February 23, 2007	Kitt Peak	Spacewatch	·	890 m	MPC · JPL
371697	2007 DC_{109}	—	February 25, 2007	Mount Lemmon	Mount Lemmon Survey	·	1.7 km	MPC · JPL
371698	2007 DD_{110}	—	February 16, 2007	Mount Lemmon	Mount Lemmon Survey	·	2.4 km	MPC · JPL
371699	2007 DL_{110}	—	February 17, 2007	Mount Lemmon	Mount Lemmon Survey	·	1.4 km	MPC · JPL
371700	2007 EZ_{4}	—	March 9, 2007	Palomar	NEAT	·	1.1 km	MPC · JPL

== 371701–371800 ==
back to top

Designation			Discovery			Properties		Ref
Permanent	Provisional	Named after	Date	Site	Discoverer(s)	Category	Diam.	Ref
371701	2007 ER_{6}	—	February 21, 2007	Mount Lemmon	Mount Lemmon Survey	AEO	1.3 km	MPC · JPL
371702	2007 EP_{15}	—	March 9, 2007	Kitt Peak	Spacewatch	·	2.2 km	MPC · JPL
371703	2007 EW_{20}	—	March 10, 2007	Kitt Peak	Spacewatch	·	1.5 km	MPC · JPL
371704	2007 EC_{21}	—	March 10, 2007	Kitt Peak	Spacewatch	·	1.8 km	MPC · JPL
371705	2007 EW_{27}	—	March 9, 2007	Catalina	CSS	·	2.4 km	MPC · JPL
371706	2007 EK_{28}	—	March 9, 2007	Palomar	NEAT	HNS	1.6 km	MPC · JPL
371707	2007 EK_{34}	—	December 27, 2006	Mount Lemmon	Mount Lemmon Survey	(18466)	2.5 km	MPC · JPL
371708	2007 EE_{39}	—	February 17, 2007	Socorro	LINEAR	·	2.6 km	MPC · JPL
371709	2007 EF_{41}	—	March 9, 2007	Palomar	NEAT	·	1.2 km	MPC · JPL
371710	2007 EO_{43}	—	March 9, 2007	Kitt Peak	Spacewatch	·	2.3 km	MPC · JPL
371711	2007 EE_{45}	—	March 9, 2007	Kitt Peak	Spacewatch	·	2.5 km	MPC · JPL
371712	2007 EQ_{45}	—	March 9, 2007	Kitt Peak	Spacewatch	·	2.5 km	MPC · JPL
371713	2007 EJ_{46}	—	March 9, 2007	Mount Lemmon	Mount Lemmon Survey	RAF	960 m	MPC · JPL
371714	2007 EZ_{48}	—	March 9, 2007	Kitt Peak	Spacewatch	·	2.0 km	MPC · JPL
371715	2007 EY_{55}	—	March 12, 2007	Mount Lemmon	Mount Lemmon Survey	·	1.8 km	MPC · JPL
371716	2007 EL_{57}	—	February 17, 2007	Kitt Peak	Spacewatch	·	2.4 km	MPC · JPL
371717	2007 EE_{63}	—	February 17, 2007	Kitt Peak	Spacewatch	·	1.8 km	MPC · JPL
371718	2007 ED_{69}	—	March 10, 2007	Kitt Peak	Spacewatch	·	1.9 km	MPC · JPL
371719	2007 ET_{74}	—	March 10, 2007	Kitt Peak	Spacewatch	·	2.3 km	MPC · JPL
371720	2007 EU_{78}	—	February 17, 2007	Catalina	CSS	·	1.7 km	MPC · JPL
371721	2007 EA_{84}	—	March 12, 2007	Mount Lemmon	Mount Lemmon Survey	NEM	2.1 km	MPC · JPL
371722	2007 ED_{84}	—	March 12, 2007	Mount Lemmon	Mount Lemmon Survey	(5)	1.4 km	MPC · JPL
371723	2007 EY_{85}	—	March 12, 2007	Mount Lemmon	Mount Lemmon Survey	BAR	1.6 km	MPC · JPL
371724	2007 EZ_{85}	—	March 12, 2007	Mount Lemmon	Mount Lemmon Survey	HNS	1.4 km	MPC · JPL
371725	2007 EZ_{87}	—	March 13, 2007	Saint-Sulpice	B. Christophe	·	3.3 km	MPC · JPL
371726	2007 EU_{99}	—	March 11, 2007	Kitt Peak	Spacewatch	·	1.4 km	MPC · JPL
371727	2007 EG_{101}	—	March 11, 2007	Kitt Peak	Spacewatch	ADE	2.0 km	MPC · JPL
371728	2007 EB_{105}	—	March 11, 2007	Mount Lemmon	Mount Lemmon Survey	(5)	1.0 km	MPC · JPL
371729	2007 EN_{106}	—	March 11, 2007	Anderson Mesa	LONEOS	·	2.9 km	MPC · JPL
371730	2007 EU_{126}	—	March 9, 2007	Mount Lemmon	Mount Lemmon Survey	·	850 m	MPC · JPL
371731	2007 EN_{127}	—	March 9, 2007	Mount Lemmon	Mount Lemmon Survey	·	2.9 km	MPC · JPL
371732	2007 EZ_{130}	—	March 9, 2007	Mount Lemmon	Mount Lemmon Survey	·	1.6 km	MPC · JPL
371733	2007 EE_{137}	—	February 9, 2007	Kitt Peak	Spacewatch	·	1.9 km	MPC · JPL
371734	2007 EQ_{139}	—	March 12, 2007	Kitt Peak	Spacewatch	(12739)	1.8 km	MPC · JPL
371735	2007 EM_{149}	—	March 12, 2007	Mount Lemmon	Mount Lemmon Survey	·	1.8 km	MPC · JPL
371736	2007 EJ_{150}	—	March 12, 2007	Mount Lemmon	Mount Lemmon Survey	·	1.8 km	MPC · JPL
371737	2007 EO_{156}	—	March 12, 2007	Kitt Peak	Spacewatch	·	1.7 km	MPC · JPL
371738	2007 EE_{157}	—	March 13, 2007	Kitt Peak	Spacewatch	AGN	1.2 km	MPC · JPL
371739	2007 ET_{166}	—	March 11, 2007	Mount Lemmon	Mount Lemmon Survey	ADE	2.0 km	MPC · JPL
371740	2007 EL_{171}	—	March 13, 2007	Črni Vrh	Mikuž, H.	BAR	1.9 km	MPC · JPL
371741	2007 ET_{171}	—	March 11, 2007	Kitt Peak	Spacewatch	·	2.1 km	MPC · JPL
371742	2007 EQ_{190}	—	February 23, 2007	Kitt Peak	Spacewatch	(5)	1.0 km	MPC · JPL
371743	2007 EL_{192}	—	March 14, 2007	Kitt Peak	Spacewatch	L5	9.1 km	MPC · JPL
371744	2007 EG_{195}	—	March 15, 2007	Kitt Peak	Spacewatch	·	1.6 km	MPC · JPL
371745	2007 EZ_{203}	—	March 10, 2007	Mount Lemmon	Mount Lemmon Survey	HNS	1.2 km	MPC · JPL
371746	2007 EH_{217}	—	March 10, 2007	Mount Lemmon	Mount Lemmon Survey	·	2.2 km	MPC · JPL
371747	2007 EU_{217}	—	March 13, 2007	Kitt Peak	Spacewatch	·	1.4 km	MPC · JPL
371748	2007 EQ_{218}	—	March 10, 2007	Palomar	NEAT	H	620 m	MPC · JPL
371749	2007 EY_{218}	—	March 12, 2007	Catalina	CSS	HNS	1.6 km	MPC · JPL
371750	2007 EM_{223}	—	March 14, 2007	Mount Lemmon	Mount Lemmon Survey	·	3.0 km	MPC · JPL
371751	2007 FX_{1}	—	March 18, 2007	Pla D'Arguines	R. Ferrando	·	2.6 km	MPC · JPL
371752	2007 FZ_{16}	—	March 20, 2007	Mount Lemmon	Mount Lemmon Survey	(5)	970 m	MPC · JPL
371753	2007 FU_{21}	—	February 22, 2007	Kitt Peak	Spacewatch	·	2.2 km	MPC · JPL
371754	2007 FZ_{24}	—	March 20, 2007	Kitt Peak	Spacewatch	·	1.6 km	MPC · JPL
371755	2007 FL_{26}	—	March 20, 2007	Kitt Peak	Spacewatch	·	2.1 km	MPC · JPL
371756	2007 FM_{34}	—	March 25, 2007	Altschwendt	W. Ries	·	2.5 km	MPC · JPL
371757	2007 FK_{37}	—	March 26, 2007	Mount Lemmon	Mount Lemmon Survey	·	2.1 km	MPC · JPL
371758	2007 FQ_{40}	—	March 20, 2007	Mount Lemmon	Mount Lemmon Survey	·	1.7 km	MPC · JPL
371759	2007 FH_{47}	—	March 26, 2007	Mount Lemmon	Mount Lemmon Survey	·	1.5 km	MPC · JPL
371760	2007 GB_{14}	—	April 11, 2007	Kitt Peak	Spacewatch	·	2.3 km	MPC · JPL
371761	2007 GU_{25}	—	April 14, 2007	Kitt Peak	Spacewatch	·	1.6 km	MPC · JPL
371762	2007 GU_{26}	—	April 14, 2007	Kitt Peak	Spacewatch	HOF	2.5 km	MPC · JPL
371763	2007 GM_{33}	—	April 11, 2007	Mount Lemmon	Mount Lemmon Survey	·	2.1 km	MPC · JPL
371764	2007 GC_{49}	—	April 14, 2007	Kitt Peak	Spacewatch	·	2.5 km	MPC · JPL
371765	2007 GH_{51}	—	April 7, 2007	Catalina	CSS	H	680 m	MPC · JPL
371766	2007 GQ_{53}	—	September 22, 2004	Kitt Peak	Spacewatch	HOF	2.8 km	MPC · JPL
371767	2007 GE_{61}	—	April 15, 2007	Kitt Peak	Spacewatch	·	2.3 km	MPC · JPL
371768	2007 GH_{62}	—	April 15, 2007	Kitt Peak	Spacewatch	·	2.2 km	MPC · JPL
371769	2007 HD_{3}	—	April 16, 2007	Mount Lemmon	Mount Lemmon Survey	·	2.1 km	MPC · JPL
371770	2007 HA_{10}	—	April 18, 2007	Mount Lemmon	Mount Lemmon Survey	NEM	2.3 km	MPC · JPL
371771	2007 HF_{18}	—	March 18, 2007	Kitt Peak	Spacewatch	·	1.9 km	MPC · JPL
371772	2007 HE_{20}	—	April 14, 2007	Kitt Peak	Spacewatch	·	1.9 km	MPC · JPL
371773	2007 HA_{24}	—	April 18, 2007	Kitt Peak	Spacewatch	·	2.3 km	MPC · JPL
371774	2007 HH_{34}	—	April 15, 2007	Kitt Peak	Spacewatch	·	1.9 km	MPC · JPL
371775	2007 HN_{36}	—	April 19, 2007	Kitt Peak	Spacewatch	·	3.2 km	MPC · JPL
371776	2007 HM_{38}	—	April 20, 2007	Mount Lemmon	Mount Lemmon Survey	·	2.2 km	MPC · JPL
371777	2007 HL_{44}	—	April 24, 2007	Tiki	S. F. Hönig, Teamo, N.	·	2.5 km	MPC · JPL
371778	2007 HU_{70}	—	April 19, 2007	Kitt Peak	Spacewatch	KOR	1.5 km	MPC · JPL
371779	2007 HH_{76}	—	April 22, 2007	Kitt Peak	Spacewatch	·	2.4 km	MPC · JPL
371780	2007 JV_{6}	—	April 19, 2007	Kitt Peak	Spacewatch	·	1.9 km	MPC · JPL
371781	2007 JB_{15}	—	May 10, 2007	Mount Lemmon	Mount Lemmon Survey	HOF	2.9 km	MPC · JPL
371782	2007 KN_{5}	—	May 24, 2007	Mount Lemmon	Mount Lemmon Survey	·	5.0 km	MPC · JPL
371783	2007 LK_{5}	—	June 9, 2007	Kitt Peak	Spacewatch	GEF	1.5 km	MPC · JPL
371784	2007 LZ_{28}	—	June 15, 2007	Kitt Peak	Spacewatch	·	3.4 km	MPC · JPL
371785	2007 LQ_{35}	—	April 25, 2007	Mount Lemmon	Mount Lemmon Survey	·	3.4 km	MPC · JPL
371786	2007 MO_{4}	—	June 17, 2007	Kitt Peak	Spacewatch	·	3.2 km	MPC · JPL
371787	2007 MM_{16}	—	June 22, 2007	Kitt Peak	Spacewatch	·	3.0 km	MPC · JPL
371788	2007 NS	—	July 9, 2007	Eskridge	G. Hug	EOS	2.2 km	MPC · JPL
371789	2007 OE_{3}	—	July 21, 2007	Wrightwood	J. W. Young	LIX	4.0 km	MPC · JPL
371790	2007 ON_{3}	—	July 21, 2007	Tiki	S. F. Hönig, Teamo, N.	·	900 m	MPC · JPL
371791	2007 OC_{6}	—	July 22, 2007	Lulin	LUSS	·	6.1 km	MPC · JPL
371792	2007 PP_{1}	—	August 5, 2007	Črni Vrh	Skvarč, J.	·	4.6 km	MPC · JPL
371793	2007 PG_{12}	—	August 10, 2007	Tiki	S. F. Hönig, Teamo, N.	T_{j} (2.98) · EUP	8.0 km	MPC · JPL
371794	2007 PY_{13}	—	August 8, 2007	Socorro	LINEAR	·	4.7 km	MPC · JPL
371795	2007 PS_{35}	—	August 11, 2007	Socorro	LINEAR	·	3.6 km	MPC · JPL
371796	2007 QE_{12}	—	September 4, 2007	Catalina	CSS	·	3.6 km	MPC · JPL
371797	2007 QQ_{12}	—	August 21, 2007	Siding Spring	SSS	·	1.8 km	MPC · JPL
371798	2007 RD_{4}	—	September 3, 2007	Catalina	CSS	·	5.3 km	MPC · JPL
371799	2007 RB_{16}	—	September 12, 2007	Gaisberg	Gierlinger, R.	VER	2.7 km	MPC · JPL
371800	2007 RN_{22}	—	September 3, 2007	Catalina	CSS	·	4.5 km	MPC · JPL

== 371801–371900 ==
back to top

Designation			Discovery			Properties		Ref
Permanent	Provisional	Named after	Date	Site	Discoverer(s)	Category	Diam.	Ref
371801	2007 RE_{36}	—	September 8, 2007	Anderson Mesa	LONEOS	TIR	3.6 km	MPC · JPL
371802	2007 RJ_{51}	—	September 9, 2007	Kitt Peak	Spacewatch	CYB	4.2 km	MPC · JPL
371803	2007 RR_{57}	—	September 9, 2007	Kitt Peak	Spacewatch	·	690 m	MPC · JPL
371804	2007 RS_{68}	—	September 10, 2007	Kitt Peak	Spacewatch	·	5.5 km	MPC · JPL
371805	2007 RW_{149}	—	September 12, 2007	Siding Spring	SSS	T_{j} (2.98)	5.4 km	MPC · JPL
371806	2007 RQ_{162}	—	September 10, 2007	Kitt Peak	Spacewatch	HYG	2.8 km	MPC · JPL
371807	2007 RE_{190}	—	September 11, 2007	Catalina	CSS	·	4.5 km	MPC · JPL
371808	2007 RD_{289}	—	September 10, 2007	Mount Lemmon	Mount Lemmon Survey	·	1.0 km	MPC · JPL
371809	2007 RG_{308}	—	September 11, 2007	Kitt Peak	Spacewatch	THM	5.4 km	MPC · JPL
371810	2007 RR_{308}	—	August 24, 2007	Kitt Peak	Spacewatch	·	3.1 km	MPC · JPL
371811	2007 TZ_{36}	—	October 4, 2007	Mount Lemmon	Mount Lemmon Survey	T_{j} (2.99)	3.8 km	MPC · JPL
371812	2007 TA_{60}	—	October 5, 2007	Kitt Peak	Spacewatch	CYB	5.6 km	MPC · JPL
371813	2007 TQ_{62}	—	October 7, 2007	Mount Lemmon	Mount Lemmon Survey	CYB	4.2 km	MPC · JPL
371814	2007 TD_{65}	—	October 7, 2007	Mount Lemmon	Mount Lemmon Survey	·	560 m	MPC · JPL
371815	2007 TQ_{144}	—	October 6, 2007	Socorro	LINEAR	SYL · CYB	6.6 km	MPC · JPL
371816	2007 TD_{232}	—	October 8, 2007	Kitt Peak	Spacewatch	·	610 m	MPC · JPL
371817	2007 TV_{337}	—	October 13, 2007	Catalina	CSS	·	5.4 km	MPC · JPL
371818	2007 TY_{349}	—	August 16, 2007	XuYi	PMO NEO Survey Program	T_{j} (2.94)	3.1 km	MPC · JPL
371819	2007 TN_{356}	—	September 9, 2007	Kitt Peak	Spacewatch	·	3.5 km	MPC · JPL
371820	2007 UW	—	October 16, 2007	Mount Lemmon	Mount Lemmon Survey	·	2.6 km	MPC · JPL
371821	2007 UJ_{12}	—	October 19, 2007	Mount Lemmon	Mount Lemmon Survey	TIR	3.3 km	MPC · JPL
371822	2007 UD_{43}	—	May 6, 2006	Mount Lemmon	Mount Lemmon Survey	·	640 m	MPC · JPL
371823	2007 UY_{49}	—	October 24, 2007	Mount Lemmon	Mount Lemmon Survey	·	1.2 km	MPC · JPL
371824	2007 UJ_{108}	—	October 11, 2007	Kitt Peak	Spacewatch	·	760 m	MPC · JPL
371825	2007 UO_{132}	—	October 20, 2007	Mount Lemmon	Mount Lemmon Survey	·	630 m	MPC · JPL
371826	2007 US_{132}	—	October 20, 2007	Mount Lemmon	Mount Lemmon Survey	·	560 m	MPC · JPL
371827	2007 UZ_{132}	—	October 20, 2007	Mount Lemmon	Mount Lemmon Survey	·	640 m	MPC · JPL
371828	2007 VC_{5}	—	November 3, 2007	Dauban	Chante-Perdrix	·	6.2 km	MPC · JPL
371829	2007 VF_{6}	—	November 3, 2007	Mount Lemmon	Mount Lemmon Survey	EUP	4.6 km	MPC · JPL
371830	2007 VS_{62}	—	November 1, 2007	Kitt Peak	Spacewatch	·	540 m	MPC · JPL
371831	2007 VD_{98}	—	November 1, 2007	Kitt Peak	Spacewatch	·	700 m	MPC · JPL
371832	2007 VJ_{230}	—	November 7, 2007	Kitt Peak	Spacewatch	·	760 m	MPC · JPL
371833	2007 VU_{235}	—	November 11, 2007	Mount Lemmon	Mount Lemmon Survey	·	670 m	MPC · JPL
371834	2007 VR_{245}	—	November 8, 2007	Catalina	CSS	CYB	7.0 km	MPC · JPL
371835	2007 VW_{314}	—	November 2, 2007	Kitt Peak	Spacewatch	·	700 m	MPC · JPL
371836	2007 VE_{317}	—	November 11, 2007	Mount Lemmon	Mount Lemmon Survey	V	830 m	MPC · JPL
371837	2007 VM_{318}	—	November 7, 2007	Kitt Peak	Spacewatch	T_{j} (2.94) · 3:2	9.7 km	MPC · JPL
371838	2007 VW_{324}	—	November 8, 2007	Kitt Peak	Spacewatch	·	670 m	MPC · JPL
371839	2007 VU_{334}	—	November 14, 2007	Kitt Peak	Spacewatch	·	710 m	MPC · JPL
371840	2007 VE_{335}	—	November 14, 2007	Kitt Peak	Spacewatch	·	790 m	MPC · JPL
371841	2007 WK_{27}	—	November 3, 2007	Kitt Peak	Spacewatch	·	560 m	MPC · JPL
371842	2007 WH_{58}	—	November 18, 2007	Mount Lemmon	Mount Lemmon Survey	·	680 m	MPC · JPL
371843	2007 XX_{25}	—	December 15, 2007	Dauban	Chante-Perdrix	·	1.1 km	MPC · JPL
371844	2007 XA_{30}	—	December 15, 2007	Catalina	CSS	·	740 m	MPC · JPL
371845	2007 XC_{50}	—	December 15, 2007	Kitt Peak	Spacewatch	·	640 m	MPC · JPL
371846	2007 YT_{11}	—	December 17, 2007	Mount Lemmon	Mount Lemmon Survey	·	750 m	MPC · JPL
371847	2007 YQ_{14}	—	December 17, 2007	Mount Lemmon	Mount Lemmon Survey	·	1.2 km	MPC · JPL
371848	2007 YU_{34}	—	December 28, 2007	Kitt Peak	Spacewatch	·	1.3 km	MPC · JPL
371849	2007 YE_{38}	—	December 30, 2007	Mount Lemmon	Mount Lemmon Survey	·	1.1 km	MPC · JPL
371850	2007 YV_{48}	—	December 28, 2007	Kitt Peak	Spacewatch	·	1.0 km	MPC · JPL
371851	2007 YK_{63}	—	December 31, 2007	Kitt Peak	Spacewatch	·	790 m	MPC · JPL
371852	2007 YP_{74}	—	December 17, 2007	Mount Lemmon	Mount Lemmon Survey	JUN	1.1 km	MPC · JPL
371853	2008 AD_{20}	—	January 10, 2008	Catalina	CSS	·	740 m	MPC · JPL
371854	2008 AE_{20}	—	January 10, 2008	Catalina	CSS	·	1.1 km	MPC · JPL
371855	2008 AA_{29}	—	January 5, 2008	Mayhill	Dillon, W. G., Wells, D.	·	810 m	MPC · JPL
371856	2008 AP_{64}	—	January 10, 2008	Catalina	CSS	·	1.1 km	MPC · JPL
371857	2008 AE_{75}	—	January 11, 2008	Kitt Peak	Spacewatch	·	1.1 km	MPC · JPL
371858	2008 AQ_{98}	—	January 1, 2008	Kitt Peak	Spacewatch	·	1.3 km	MPC · JPL
371859	2008 AJ_{111}	—	December 15, 2007	Mount Lemmon	Mount Lemmon Survey	·	750 m	MPC · JPL
371860	2008 BX_{7}	—	December 19, 2007	Mount Lemmon	Mount Lemmon Survey	·	870 m	MPC · JPL
371861	2008 BN_{19}	—	December 31, 2007	Kitt Peak	Spacewatch	·	680 m	MPC · JPL
371862	2008 BX_{24}	—	January 30, 2008	Kitt Peak	Spacewatch	·	1.1 km	MPC · JPL
371863	2008 BN_{26}	—	December 31, 2007	Mount Lemmon	Mount Lemmon Survey	NYS	1.3 km	MPC · JPL
371864	2008 BZ_{37}	—	January 31, 2008	Mount Lemmon	Mount Lemmon Survey	·	1.5 km	MPC · JPL
371865	2008 BN_{47}	—	January 30, 2008	Mount Lemmon	Mount Lemmon Survey	·	980 m	MPC · JPL
371866	2008 CQ_{4}	—	February 2, 2008	Mount Lemmon	Mount Lemmon Survey	·	1.1 km	MPC · JPL
371867	2008 CO_{21}	—	December 31, 2007	Kitt Peak	Spacewatch	·	1.2 km	MPC · JPL
371868	2008 CQ_{21}	—	February 7, 2008	Taunus	E. Schwab, Zimmer, U.	·	720 m	MPC · JPL
371869	2008 CJ_{24}	—	December 14, 2007	Mount Lemmon	Mount Lemmon Survey	·	1.3 km	MPC · JPL
371870	2008 CP_{24}	—	February 1, 2008	Kitt Peak	Spacewatch	·	1.1 km	MPC · JPL
371871	2008 CQ_{24}	—	February 1, 2008	Kitt Peak	Spacewatch	·	770 m	MPC · JPL
371872	2008 CW_{24}	—	February 1, 2008	Kitt Peak	Spacewatch	·	1.4 km	MPC · JPL
371873	2008 CZ_{29}	—	January 19, 2008	Kitt Peak	Spacewatch	NYS	1.2 km	MPC · JPL
371874	2008 CN_{30}	—	February 2, 2008	Kitt Peak	Spacewatch	·	930 m	MPC · JPL
371875	2008 CX_{33}	—	February 2, 2008	Kitt Peak	Spacewatch	NYS	1.1 km	MPC · JPL
371876	2008 CU_{34}	—	February 2, 2008	Kitt Peak	Spacewatch	V	770 m	MPC · JPL
371877	2008 CJ_{35}	—	February 2, 2008	Kitt Peak	Spacewatch	·	1.2 km	MPC · JPL
371878	2008 CF_{36}	—	February 2, 2008	Kitt Peak	Spacewatch	3:2	6.3 km	MPC · JPL
371879	2008 CR_{40}	—	February 2, 2008	Kitt Peak	Spacewatch	·	1.5 km	MPC · JPL
371880	2008 CQ_{47}	—	February 3, 2008	Kitt Peak	Spacewatch	·	730 m	MPC · JPL
371881	2008 CW_{49}	—	February 6, 2008	Catalina	CSS	·	1.7 km	MPC · JPL
371882	2008 CR_{53}	—	February 7, 2008	Mount Lemmon	Mount Lemmon Survey	·	650 m	MPC · JPL
371883	2008 CC_{54}	—	February 7, 2008	Catalina	CSS	·	770 m	MPC · JPL
371884	2008 CE_{56}	—	January 12, 2008	Kitt Peak	Spacewatch	·	890 m	MPC · JPL
371885	2008 CG_{68}	—	February 2, 2008	Socorro	LINEAR	·	770 m	MPC · JPL
371886	2008 CM_{68}	—	November 18, 2007	Mount Lemmon	Mount Lemmon Survey	V	860 m	MPC · JPL
371887	2008 CE_{74}	—	December 31, 2007	Mount Lemmon	Mount Lemmon Survey	·	840 m	MPC · JPL
371888	2008 CY_{75}	—	February 3, 2008	Kitt Peak	Spacewatch	·	1.6 km	MPC · JPL
371889	2008 CH_{82}	—	February 7, 2008	Kitt Peak	Spacewatch	·	1.6 km	MPC · JPL
371890	2008 CH_{87}	—	February 7, 2008	Mount Lemmon	Mount Lemmon Survey	·	1.4 km	MPC · JPL
371891	2008 CQ_{87}	—	April 12, 1994	Kitt Peak	Spacewatch	·	1.0 km	MPC · JPL
371892	2008 CL_{91}	—	February 8, 2008	Kitt Peak	Spacewatch	MAS	630 m	MPC · JPL
371893	2008 CD_{110}	—	February 9, 2008	Kitt Peak	Spacewatch	·	1.3 km	MPC · JPL
371894	2008 CT_{122}	—	February 7, 2008	Mount Lemmon	Mount Lemmon Survey	NYS	810 m	MPC · JPL
371895	2008 CB_{123}	—	February 7, 2008	Mount Lemmon	Mount Lemmon Survey	MAS	710 m	MPC · JPL
371896	2008 CF_{130}	—	December 31, 2007	Mount Lemmon	Mount Lemmon Survey	·	1.0 km	MPC · JPL
371897	2008 CF_{133}	—	February 8, 2008	Kitt Peak	Spacewatch	·	1.3 km	MPC · JPL
371898	2008 CR_{133}	—	February 8, 2008	Kitt Peak	Spacewatch	·	760 m	MPC · JPL
371899	2008 CL_{142}	—	January 10, 2008	Mount Lemmon	Mount Lemmon Survey	·	1.2 km	MPC · JPL
371900	2008 CP_{142}	—	February 8, 2008	Kitt Peak	Spacewatch	·	1.3 km	MPC · JPL

== 371901–372000 ==
back to top

Designation			Discovery			Properties		Ref
Permanent	Provisional	Named after	Date	Site	Discoverer(s)	Category	Diam.	Ref
371901	2008 CY_{147}	—	February 9, 2008	Kitt Peak	Spacewatch	V	760 m	MPC · JPL
371902	2008 CF_{150}	—	February 9, 2008	Kitt Peak	Spacewatch	·	1.0 km	MPC · JPL
371903	2008 CM_{175}	—	February 6, 2008	Socorro	LINEAR	(2076)	810 m	MPC · JPL
371904	2008 CG_{183}	—	February 11, 2008	Mount Lemmon	Mount Lemmon Survey	V	690 m	MPC · JPL
371905	2008 CK_{198}	—	February 12, 2008	Kitt Peak	Spacewatch	·	980 m	MPC · JPL
371906	2008 CT_{201}	—	February 8, 2008	Kitt Peak	Spacewatch	V	560 m	MPC · JPL
371907	2008 CC_{213}	—	February 9, 2008	Mount Lemmon	Mount Lemmon Survey	·	1.2 km	MPC · JPL
371908	2008 DD_{16}	—	February 27, 2008	Catalina	CSS	·	1.2 km	MPC · JPL
371909	2008 DK_{22}	—	February 28, 2008	Catalina	CSS	·	1.4 km	MPC · JPL
371910	2008 DO_{32}	—	January 11, 2008	Mount Lemmon	Mount Lemmon Survey	MAS	780 m	MPC · JPL
371911	2008 DB_{47}	—	February 28, 2008	Kitt Peak	Spacewatch	L5	10 km	MPC · JPL
371912	2008 DG_{55}	—	February 26, 2008	Kitt Peak	Spacewatch	·	1.4 km	MPC · JPL
371913	2008 DQ_{58}	—	February 26, 2008	Kitt Peak	Spacewatch	·	890 m	MPC · JPL
371914	2008 DS_{58}	—	February 26, 2008	Kitt Peak	Spacewatch	NYS	850 m	MPC · JPL
371915	2008 DZ_{71}	—	February 26, 2008	Kitt Peak	Spacewatch	·	740 m	MPC · JPL
371916	2008 DQ_{72}	—	February 8, 2008	Kitt Peak	Spacewatch	·	1.7 km	MPC · JPL
371917	2008 DW_{81}	—	February 28, 2008	Kitt Peak	Spacewatch	·	1.3 km	MPC · JPL
371918	2008 DX_{81}	—	February 28, 2008	Kitt Peak	Spacewatch	L5	10 km	MPC · JPL
371919	2008 DK_{83}	—	February 29, 2008	Kitt Peak	Spacewatch	·	1.2 km	MPC · JPL
371920	2008 DN_{88}	—	February 18, 2008	Mount Lemmon	Mount Lemmon Survey	·	1.2 km	MPC · JPL
371921	2008 EZ	—	March 1, 2008	Kitt Peak	Spacewatch	·	770 m	MPC · JPL
371922	2008 EE_{7}	—	March 5, 2008	Altschwendt	W. Ries	V	680 m	MPC · JPL
371923	2008 EY_{10}	—	March 1, 2008	Kitt Peak	Spacewatch	·	1.0 km	MPC · JPL
371924	2008 EE_{13}	—	February 10, 2008	Kitt Peak	Spacewatch	·	1.1 km	MPC · JPL
371925	2008 ET_{13}	—	March 1, 2008	Kitt Peak	Spacewatch	·	1.7 km	MPC · JPL
371926	2008 EL_{17}	—	March 1, 2008	Kitt Peak	Spacewatch	V	740 m	MPC · JPL
371927	2008 EE_{19}	—	January 1, 2008	Kitt Peak	Spacewatch	·	780 m	MPC · JPL
371928	2008 EX_{25}	—	February 8, 2008	Mount Lemmon	Mount Lemmon Survey	V	620 m	MPC · JPL
371929	2008 EV_{59}	—	March 8, 2008	Catalina	CSS	·	1.4 km	MPC · JPL
371930	2008 EN_{64}	—	March 1, 2008	Kitt Peak	Spacewatch	·	1.5 km	MPC · JPL
371931	2008 EH_{70}	—	February 11, 2008	Mount Lemmon	Mount Lemmon Survey	·	1.9 km	MPC · JPL
371932	2008 ES_{70}	—	March 5, 2008	Mount Lemmon	Mount Lemmon Survey	·	1.5 km	MPC · JPL
371933	2008 EQ_{75}	—	March 7, 2008	Kitt Peak	Spacewatch	V	650 m	MPC · JPL
371934	2008 ET_{75}	—	February 28, 2008	Kitt Peak	Spacewatch	NYS	920 m	MPC · JPL
371935	2008 EV_{78}	—	March 8, 2008	Mount Lemmon	Mount Lemmon Survey	·	1.3 km	MPC · JPL
371936	2008 ED_{79}	—	March 8, 2008	Catalina	CSS	·	1.2 km	MPC · JPL
371937	2008 EH_{104}	—	March 6, 2008	Mount Lemmon	Mount Lemmon Survey	V	670 m	MPC · JPL
371938	2008 EX_{108}	—	March 7, 2008	Mount Lemmon	Mount Lemmon Survey	NYS	1.2 km	MPC · JPL
371939	2008 EL_{121}	—	March 9, 2008	Kitt Peak	Spacewatch	·	1.0 km	MPC · JPL
371940	2008 ET_{127}	—	March 11, 2008	Kitt Peak	Spacewatch	·	900 m	MPC · JPL
371941	2008 ET_{129}	—	February 8, 2008	Mount Lemmon	Mount Lemmon Survey	·	1.1 km	MPC · JPL
371942	2008 EO_{138}	—	March 11, 2008	Mount Lemmon	Mount Lemmon Survey	·	1.6 km	MPC · JPL
371943	2008 EZ_{138}	—	March 11, 2008	Kitt Peak	Spacewatch	(1547)	1.7 km	MPC · JPL
371944	2008 EW_{140}	—	February 27, 2008	Kitt Peak	Spacewatch	EUN	1.2 km	MPC · JPL
371945	2008 EV_{142}	—	February 28, 2008	Kitt Peak	Spacewatch	·	1.1 km	MPC · JPL
371946	2008 EU_{148}	—	March 2, 2008	Kitt Peak	Spacewatch	·	1.5 km	MPC · JPL
371947	2008 ET_{149}	—	March 5, 2008	Kitt Peak	Spacewatch	·	1.0 km	MPC · JPL
371948	2008 EW_{166}	—	March 6, 2008	Mount Lemmon	Mount Lemmon Survey	·	1.8 km	MPC · JPL
371949	2008 FB_{3}	—	March 25, 2008	Kitt Peak	Spacewatch	·	1.1 km	MPC · JPL
371950	2008 FB_{7}	—	March 30, 2008	Grove Creek	Tozzi, F.	·	2.1 km	MPC · JPL
371951	2008 FX_{19}	—	February 27, 2008	Mount Lemmon	Mount Lemmon Survey	·	1.2 km	MPC · JPL
371952	2008 FK_{26}	—	March 27, 2008	Kitt Peak	Spacewatch	·	1.6 km	MPC · JPL
371953	2008 FG_{34}	—	March 28, 2008	Mount Lemmon	Mount Lemmon Survey	·	1.0 km	MPC · JPL
371954	2008 FY_{37}	—	March 28, 2008	Kitt Peak	Spacewatch	·	1.0 km	MPC · JPL
371955	2008 FY_{38}	—	March 28, 2008	Kitt Peak	Spacewatch	·	1.4 km	MPC · JPL
371956	2008 FA_{39}	—	March 28, 2008	Kitt Peak	Spacewatch	·	820 m	MPC · JPL
371957	2008 FQ_{43}	—	March 28, 2008	Mount Lemmon	Mount Lemmon Survey	·	980 m	MPC · JPL
371958	2008 FX_{49}	—	March 28, 2008	Mount Lemmon	Mount Lemmon Survey	·	1.1 km	MPC · JPL
371959	2008 FT_{50}	—	March 28, 2008	Kitt Peak	Spacewatch	·	1 km	MPC · JPL
371960	2008 FM_{51}	—	October 1, 2005	Kitt Peak	Spacewatch	·	960 m	MPC · JPL
371961	2008 FQ_{58}	—	March 28, 2008	Mount Lemmon	Mount Lemmon Survey	·	1.1 km	MPC · JPL
371962	2008 FQ_{83}	—	March 28, 2008	Kitt Peak	Spacewatch	·	1.5 km	MPC · JPL
371963	2008 FX_{97}	—	March 30, 2008	Kitt Peak	Spacewatch	·	1.6 km	MPC · JPL
371964	2008 FE_{101}	—	March 30, 2008	Kitt Peak	Spacewatch	·	1.3 km	MPC · JPL
371965	2008 FV_{102}	—	March 30, 2008	Kitt Peak	Spacewatch	·	1.5 km	MPC · JPL
371966	2008 FV_{116}	—	March 31, 2008	Kitt Peak	Spacewatch	·	1.3 km	MPC · JPL
371967	2008 FV_{125}	—	March 31, 2008	Mount Lemmon	Mount Lemmon Survey	·	1.5 km	MPC · JPL
371968	2008 FM_{126}	—	March 29, 2008	Kitt Peak	Spacewatch	·	1.6 km	MPC · JPL
371969	2008 FV_{128}	—	March 29, 2008	Kitt Peak	Spacewatch	·	1.3 km	MPC · JPL
371970	2008 FV_{132}	—	March 29, 2008	Kitt Peak	Spacewatch	·	1.0 km	MPC · JPL
371971	2008 FQ_{134}	—	March 30, 2008	Kitt Peak	Spacewatch	KON	1.9 km	MPC · JPL
371972	2008 FQ_{135}	—	March 31, 2008	Mount Lemmon	Mount Lemmon Survey	EUN	1.4 km	MPC · JPL
371973	2008 GE_{1}	—	April 4, 2008	Mount Lemmon	Mount Lemmon Survey	AMO	440 m	MPC · JPL
371974	2008 GO_{12}	—	January 11, 2008	Mount Lemmon	Mount Lemmon Survey	NYS	1.2 km	MPC · JPL
371975	2008 GK_{14}	—	March 11, 2008	Kitt Peak	Spacewatch	·	1.3 km	MPC · JPL
371976	2008 GW_{38}	—	April 3, 2008	Mount Lemmon	Mount Lemmon Survey	·	1.4 km	MPC · JPL
371977	2008 GN_{40}	—	April 4, 2008	Kitt Peak	Spacewatch	(5)	1.3 km	MPC · JPL
371978	2008 GC_{52}	—	April 5, 2008	Mount Lemmon	Mount Lemmon Survey	(5)	1.2 km	MPC · JPL
371979	2008 GR_{66}	—	April 6, 2008	Kitt Peak	Spacewatch	·	1.2 km	MPC · JPL
371980	2008 GO_{68}	—	February 10, 2008	Mount Lemmon	Mount Lemmon Survey	·	1.6 km	MPC · JPL
371981	2008 GY_{76}	—	February 10, 2007	Mount Lemmon	Mount Lemmon Survey	V	720 m	MPC · JPL
371982	2008 GK_{93}	—	April 6, 2008	Catalina	CSS	·	1.6 km	MPC · JPL
371983	2008 GH_{95}	—	April 8, 2008	Kitt Peak	Spacewatch	·	1.3 km	MPC · JPL
371984	2008 GY_{95}	—	April 8, 2008	Kitt Peak	Spacewatch	·	1.2 km	MPC · JPL
371985	2008 GL_{100}	—	April 9, 2008	Kitt Peak	Spacewatch	EUN	1.4 km	MPC · JPL
371986	2008 GZ_{103}	—	April 11, 2008	Kitt Peak	Spacewatch	·	1.3 km	MPC · JPL
371987	2008 GM_{104}	—	March 4, 2008	Mount Lemmon	Mount Lemmon Survey	·	1.2 km	MPC · JPL
371988	2008 GO_{110}	—	December 20, 2007	Mount Lemmon	Mount Lemmon Survey	BAR	1.5 km	MPC · JPL
371989	2008 GW_{111}	—	April 11, 2008	Socorro	LINEAR	·	1.6 km	MPC · JPL
371990	2008 GF_{129}	—	April 14, 2004	Kitt Peak	Spacewatch	·	1.2 km	MPC · JPL
371991	2008 GU_{129}	—	April 4, 2008	Goodricke-Pigott	R. A. Tucker	EUN	1.6 km	MPC · JPL
371992	2008 GD_{137}	—	April 3, 2008	Kitt Peak	Spacewatch	EUN	960 m	MPC · JPL
371993	2008 GD_{144}	—	April 3, 2008	Socorro	LINEAR	·	2.0 km	MPC · JPL
371994	2008 HX_{4}	—	March 13, 2008	Kitt Peak	Spacewatch	·	1 km	MPC · JPL
371995	2008 HJ_{9}	—	February 27, 2008	Kitt Peak	Spacewatch	·	1.1 km	MPC · JPL
371996	2008 HH_{12}	—	April 4, 2008	Mount Lemmon	Mount Lemmon Survey	·	2.0 km	MPC · JPL
371997	2008 HO_{14}	—	April 11, 2008	Mount Lemmon	Mount Lemmon Survey	(5)	1.1 km	MPC · JPL
371998	2008 HC_{16}	—	April 25, 2008	Kitt Peak	Spacewatch	(5)	1.5 km	MPC · JPL
371999	2008 HU_{19}	—	April 26, 2008	Kitt Peak	Spacewatch	·	1.6 km	MPC · JPL
372000	2008 HS_{22}	—	April 9, 2008	Kitt Peak	Spacewatch	·	1.2 km	MPC · JPL

back to top

== See also ==
- Meanings of minor-planet names: 371001–372000
