= List of minor planets: 419001–420000 =

The following is a partial list of minor planets, running from minor-planet number 419001 through 420000, inclusive. The primary data for this and other partial lists is based on JPL's "Small-Body Orbital Elements" and data available from the Minor Planet Center. Critical list information is also provided by the MPC, unless otherwise specified from Lowell Observatory. A detailed description of the table's columns and additional sources are given on the main page including a complete list of every page in this series, and a statistical break-up on the dynamical classification of minor planets.

Also see the summary list of all named bodies in numerical and alphabetical order, and the corresponding naming citations for the number range of this particular list. New namings may only be added to this list after official publication, as the preannouncement of names is condemned by the Working Group for Small Bodies Nomenclature of the International Astronomical Union.

Near-Earth obj.	MBA (inner)	MBA (outer)	Centaur
Mars-crosser	MBA (middle)	Jupiter trojan	Trans-Neptunian obj.
Unclassified

== 419001–419100 ==
Designation			Discovery			Properties		Ref
Permanent	Provisional	Named after	Date	Site	Discoverer(s)	Category	Diam.	Ref
419001	2009 OW_{21}	—	July 29, 2009	Kitt Peak	Spacewatch	·	1.3 km	MPC · JPL
419002	2009 OS_{23}	—	July 24, 2000	Kitt Peak	Spacewatch	·	2.2 km	MPC · JPL
419003	2009 OC_{24}	—	July 31, 2009	Kitt Peak	Spacewatch	·	1.3 km	MPC · JPL
419004	2009 PG_{2}	—	August 12, 2009	La Sagra	OAM	ADE	2.2 km	MPC · JPL
419005	2009 PQ_{4}	—	November 2, 2005	Mount Lemmon	Mount Lemmon Survey	MRX	1.2 km	MPC · JPL
419006	2009 PV_{6}	—	July 28, 2009	Catalina	CSS	·	2.1 km	MPC · JPL
419007	2009 PF_{8}	—	August 15, 2009	Catalina	CSS	·	1.4 km	MPC · JPL
419008	2009 PA_{11}	—	August 15, 2009	Socorro	LINEAR	·	1.9 km	MPC · JPL
419009	2009 PO_{16}	—	August 15, 2009	Kitt Peak	Spacewatch	JUN	1.2 km	MPC · JPL
419010	2009 PY_{16}	—	August 1, 2009	Siding Spring	SSS	·	1.6 km	MPC · JPL
419011	2009 PB_{17}	—	August 15, 2009	La Sagra	OAM	ADE	1.9 km	MPC · JPL
419012	2009 PY_{17}	—	August 15, 2009	Kitt Peak	Spacewatch	·	990 m	MPC · JPL
419013	2009 QA_{3}	—	July 14, 2009	Kitt Peak	Spacewatch	ADE	2.4 km	MPC · JPL
419014	2009 QH_{5}	—	August 17, 2009	Farra d'Isonzo	Farra d'Isonzo	PHO	1.4 km	MPC · JPL
419015	2009 QF_{6}	—	August 19, 2009	Skylive	Tozzi, F.	·	1.9 km	MPC · JPL
419016	2009 QE_{7}	—	June 17, 2009	Mount Lemmon	Mount Lemmon Survey	·	1.4 km	MPC · JPL
419017	2009 QA_{10}	—	August 21, 2009	Sandlot	G. Hug	DOR	2.5 km	MPC · JPL
419018	2009 QS_{10}	—	October 24, 2005	Kitt Peak	Spacewatch	·	1.9 km	MPC · JPL
419019	2009 QQ_{12}	—	August 16, 2009	Kitt Peak	Spacewatch	·	1.9 km	MPC · JPL
419020	2009 QH_{22}	—	August 20, 2009	La Sagra	OAM	·	2.5 km	MPC · JPL
419021	2009 QR_{22}	—	August 20, 2009	La Sagra	OAM	ADE	2.1 km	MPC · JPL
419022	2009 QF_{31}	—	August 26, 2009	Catalina	CSS	AMO	750 m	MPC · JPL
419023	2009 QT_{36}	—	August 29, 2009	Taunus	Karge, S., Zimmer, U.	EUN	1.2 km	MPC · JPL
419024	2009 QZ_{36}	—	August 27, 2009	Kitt Peak	Spacewatch	GEF	1.2 km	MPC · JPL
419025	2009 QF_{39}	—	August 20, 2009	Kitt Peak	Spacewatch	·	1.3 km	MPC · JPL
419026	2009 QJ_{40}	—	August 26, 2009	La Sagra	OAM	·	1.5 km	MPC · JPL
419027	2009 QP_{47}	—	August 28, 2009	La Sagra	OAM	·	2.5 km	MPC · JPL
419028	2009 QY_{48}	—	August 28, 2009	La Sagra	OAM	·	1.6 km	MPC · JPL
419029	2009 QA_{54}	—	August 19, 2009	Kitt Peak	Spacewatch	·	2.5 km	MPC · JPL
419030	2009 QX_{54}	—	August 28, 2009	Catalina	CSS	·	1.9 km	MPC · JPL
419031	2009 QB_{55}	—	August 17, 2009	Catalina	CSS	·	1.7 km	MPC · JPL
419032	2009 QY_{55}	—	August 28, 2009	Kitt Peak	Spacewatch	·	1.4 km	MPC · JPL
419033	2009 QT_{57}	—	May 27, 2009	Catalina	CSS	·	2.4 km	MPC · JPL
419034	2009 QM_{58}	—	August 20, 2009	Kitt Peak	Spacewatch	·	1.6 km	MPC · JPL
419035	2009 QV_{63}	—	August 16, 2009	Kitt Peak	Spacewatch	EOS	1.7 km	MPC · JPL
419036	2009 QF_{64}	—	August 19, 2009	La Sagra	OAM	·	2.1 km	MPC · JPL
419037	2009 RH_{8}	—	September 12, 2009	Kitt Peak	Spacewatch	NEM	1.9 km	MPC · JPL
419038	2009 RW_{8}	—	September 12, 2009	Kitt Peak	Spacewatch	·	1.7 km	MPC · JPL
419039	2009 RW_{11}	—	September 12, 2009	Kitt Peak	Spacewatch	AGN	970 m	MPC · JPL
419040	2009 RU_{12}	—	September 12, 2009	Kitt Peak	Spacewatch	·	2.7 km	MPC · JPL
419041	2009 RX_{17}	—	September 12, 2009	Kitt Peak	Spacewatch	·	1.6 km	MPC · JPL
419042	2009 RZ_{17}	—	September 12, 2009	Kitt Peak	Spacewatch	·	2.2 km	MPC · JPL
419043	2009 RC_{20}	—	September 14, 2009	Catalina	CSS	·	1.7 km	MPC · JPL
419044	2009 RT_{27}	—	September 14, 2009	Kitt Peak	Spacewatch	·	1.9 km	MPC · JPL
419045	2009 RP_{28}	—	September 13, 2009	Purple Mountain	PMO NEO Survey Program	·	1.6 km	MPC · JPL
419046	2009 RN_{36}	—	August 27, 2009	Catalina	CSS	·	1.9 km	MPC · JPL
419047	2009 RT_{36}	—	September 15, 2009	Kitt Peak	Spacewatch	·	1.5 km	MPC · JPL
419048	2009 RQ_{41}	—	September 15, 2009	Kitt Peak	Spacewatch	·	1.9 km	MPC · JPL
419049	2009 RW_{41}	—	December 7, 2005	Kitt Peak	Spacewatch	·	2.5 km	MPC · JPL
419050	2009 RJ_{43}	—	September 15, 2009	Kitt Peak	Spacewatch	·	2.0 km	MPC · JPL
419051	2009 RO_{46}	—	September 15, 2009	Kitt Peak	Spacewatch	·	1.6 km	MPC · JPL
419052	2009 RS_{63}	—	September 15, 2009	Mount Lemmon	Mount Lemmon Survey	·	2.6 km	MPC · JPL
419053	2009 RP_{69}	—	September 15, 2009	Mount Lemmon	Mount Lemmon Survey	·	1.9 km	MPC · JPL
419054	2009 RX_{69}	—	September 14, 2009	Kitt Peak	Spacewatch	·	2.0 km	MPC · JPL
419055	2009 RX_{71}	—	September 15, 2009	Kitt Peak	Spacewatch	KOR	1.1 km	MPC · JPL
419056	2009 RN_{72}	—	September 15, 2009	Kitt Peak	Spacewatch	HOF	2.6 km	MPC · JPL
419057	2009 RL_{73}	—	September 12, 2009	Kitt Peak	Spacewatch	·	1.8 km	MPC · JPL
419058	2009 RS_{74}	—	September 14, 2009	Socorro	LINEAR	·	2.0 km	MPC · JPL
419059	2009 ST_{1}	—	August 15, 2009	Kitt Peak	Spacewatch	·	1.8 km	MPC · JPL
419060	2009 SL_{9}	—	January 27, 2007	Mount Lemmon	Mount Lemmon Survey	·	1.8 km	MPC · JPL
419061	2009 SX_{19}	—	September 21, 2009	Mount Lemmon	Mount Lemmon Survey	L5	10 km	MPC · JPL
419062	2009 SH_{20}	—	September 22, 2009	Drebach	Drebach	·	3.4 km	MPC · JPL
419063	2009 SD_{21}	—	September 17, 2009	Catalina	CSS	·	2.0 km	MPC · JPL
419064	2009 SY_{23}	—	September 16, 2009	Kitt Peak	Spacewatch	·	1.9 km	MPC · JPL
419065	2009 SD_{35}	—	September 16, 2009	Kitt Peak	Spacewatch	EUN	1.2 km	MPC · JPL
419066	2009 SK_{45}	—	September 16, 2009	Kitt Peak	Spacewatch	MRX	1.0 km	MPC · JPL
419067	2009 SY_{46}	—	September 16, 2009	Kitt Peak	Spacewatch	·	2.3 km	MPC · JPL
419068	2009 SL_{49}	—	September 25, 2005	Kitt Peak	Spacewatch	·	1.6 km	MPC · JPL
419069	2009 SB_{51}	—	September 17, 2009	Kitt Peak	Spacewatch	·	1.4 km	MPC · JPL
419070	2009 SR_{55}	—	February 7, 2002	Kitt Peak	Spacewatch	·	1.6 km	MPC · JPL
419071	2009 SJ_{58}	—	September 17, 2009	Kitt Peak	Spacewatch	·	1.6 km	MPC · JPL
419072	2009 SY_{60}	—	September 17, 2009	Kitt Peak	Spacewatch	·	1.6 km	MPC · JPL
419073	2009 SC_{61}	—	September 17, 2009	Kitt Peak	Spacewatch	·	2.3 km	MPC · JPL
419074	2009 SL_{61}	—	September 17, 2009	Kitt Peak	Spacewatch	·	2.3 km	MPC · JPL
419075	2009 SN_{74}	—	September 17, 2009	Kitt Peak	Spacewatch	·	3.4 km	MPC · JPL
419076	2009 SY_{78}	—	September 18, 2009	Kitt Peak	Spacewatch	WIT	910 m	MPC · JPL
419077	2009 SN_{99}	—	April 13, 2008	Mount Lemmon	Mount Lemmon Survey	·	1.7 km	MPC · JPL
419078	2009 SH_{106}	—	August 16, 2009	Kitt Peak	Spacewatch	MAR	1.3 km	MPC · JPL
419079	2009 SB_{110}	—	August 17, 2009	Kitt Peak	Spacewatch	·	2.6 km	MPC · JPL
419080	2009 SG_{114}	—	September 18, 2009	Kitt Peak	Spacewatch	·	2.0 km	MPC · JPL
419081	2009 SZ_{122}	—	September 18, 2009	Kitt Peak	Spacewatch	·	1.7 km	MPC · JPL
419082	2009 SQ_{124}	—	September 18, 2009	Kitt Peak	Spacewatch	·	2.0 km	MPC · JPL
419083	2009 SU_{124}	—	September 18, 2009	Kitt Peak	Spacewatch	·	1.6 km	MPC · JPL
419084	2009 SK_{125}	—	September 18, 2009	Kitt Peak	Spacewatch	·	2.2 km	MPC · JPL
419085	2009 SE_{126}	—	September 18, 2009	Kitt Peak	Spacewatch	·	1.9 km	MPC · JPL
419086	2009 SV_{127}	—	September 18, 2009	Catalina	CSS	·	1.6 km	MPC · JPL
419087	2009 SK_{128}	—	September 18, 2009	Kitt Peak	Spacewatch	HOF	2.4 km	MPC · JPL
419088	2009 SQ_{130}	—	September 18, 2009	Kitt Peak	Spacewatch	·	2.1 km	MPC · JPL
419089	2009 SW_{133}	—	September 18, 2009	Kitt Peak	Spacewatch	TEL	1.4 km	MPC · JPL
419090	2009 SF_{140}	—	April 25, 2003	Kitt Peak	Spacewatch	·	2.6 km	MPC · JPL
419091	2009 SE_{141}	—	September 19, 2009	Kitt Peak	Spacewatch	·	1.6 km	MPC · JPL
419092	2009 SZ_{144}	—	August 28, 2009	Kitt Peak	Spacewatch	·	1.6 km	MPC · JPL
419093	2009 SQ_{146}	—	September 19, 2009	Kitt Peak	Spacewatch	·	2.1 km	MPC · JPL
419094	2009 SQ_{147}	—	September 19, 2009	Mount Lemmon	Mount Lemmon Survey	JUN	1.0 km	MPC · JPL
419095	2009 SQ_{149}	—	September 20, 2009	Kitt Peak	Spacewatch	·	2.3 km	MPC · JPL
419096	2009 SX_{155}	—	September 20, 2009	Kitt Peak	Spacewatch	·	1.8 km	MPC · JPL
419097	2009 SE_{156}	—	September 25, 2005	Kitt Peak	Spacewatch	·	1.4 km	MPC · JPL
419098	2009 SF_{157}	—	September 20, 2009	Kitt Peak	Spacewatch	·	1.8 km	MPC · JPL
419099	2009 SW_{158}	—	September 20, 2009	Kitt Peak	Spacewatch	·	1.8 km	MPC · JPL
419100	2009 SA_{159}	—	September 20, 2009	Kitt Peak	Spacewatch	PAD	1.3 km	MPC · JPL

== 419101–419200 ==
back to top

Designation			Discovery			Properties		Ref
Permanent	Provisional	Named after	Date	Site	Discoverer(s)	Category	Diam.	Ref
419101	2009 SX_{160}	—	September 20, 2009	Mount Lemmon	Mount Lemmon Survey	·	1.5 km	MPC · JPL
419102	2009 SK_{165}	—	November 6, 2005	Mount Lemmon	Mount Lemmon Survey	·	1.3 km	MPC · JPL
419103	2009 SF_{167}	—	September 23, 2009	Mount Lemmon	Mount Lemmon Survey	·	1.9 km	MPC · JPL
419104	2009 SK_{171}	—	September 28, 2009	Wildberg	R. Apitzsch	·	1.8 km	MPC · JPL
419105	2009 SA_{173}	—	September 18, 2009	Kitt Peak	Spacewatch	·	1.8 km	MPC · JPL
419106	2009 SG_{179}	—	October 30, 2006	Mount Lemmon	Mount Lemmon Survey	·	1.6 km	MPC · JPL
419107	2009 SG_{180}	—	September 16, 2009	Kitt Peak	Spacewatch	·	1.6 km	MPC · JPL
419108	2009 SN_{183}	—	September 17, 2009	Kitt Peak	Spacewatch	·	2.1 km	MPC · JPL
419109	2009 SS_{183}	—	September 21, 2009	Kitt Peak	Spacewatch	·	2.0 km	MPC · JPL
419110	2009 SL_{185}	—	September 21, 2009	Kitt Peak	Spacewatch	PAD	1.4 km	MPC · JPL
419111	2009 SX_{188}	—	September 21, 2009	La Sagra	OAM	·	3.0 km	MPC · JPL
419112	2009 SQ_{192}	—	September 18, 1995	Kitt Peak	Spacewatch	·	1.8 km	MPC · JPL
419113	2009 SZ_{192}	—	September 22, 2009	Kitt Peak	Spacewatch	AGN	1.3 km	MPC · JPL
419114	2009 SA_{193}	—	September 22, 2009	Kitt Peak	Spacewatch	·	1.4 km	MPC · JPL
419115	2009 SU_{198}	—	September 22, 2009	Kitt Peak	Spacewatch	·	2.1 km	MPC · JPL
419116	2009 SY_{200}	—	September 10, 2009	Catalina	CSS	·	2.2 km	MPC · JPL
419117	2009 SV_{201}	—	March 10, 2007	Kitt Peak	Spacewatch	·	1.8 km	MPC · JPL
419118	2009 SO_{203}	—	September 22, 2009	Kitt Peak	Spacewatch	·	1.5 km	MPC · JPL
419119	2009 SB_{205}	—	September 22, 2009	Kitt Peak	Spacewatch	·	1.6 km	MPC · JPL
419120	2009 SX_{209}	—	September 23, 2009	Kitt Peak	Spacewatch	HOF	2.1 km	MPC · JPL
419121	2009 SL_{211}	—	September 23, 2009	Kitt Peak	Spacewatch	·	1.9 km	MPC · JPL
419122	2009 SH_{213}	—	September 15, 2009	Kitt Peak	Spacewatch	·	2.1 km	MPC · JPL
419123	2009 SK_{214}	—	September 15, 2009	Kitt Peak	Spacewatch	AST	1.5 km	MPC · JPL
419124	2009 SO_{216}	—	September 24, 2009	Kitt Peak	Spacewatch	·	2.6 km	MPC · JPL
419125	2009 SP_{227}	—	September 18, 2009	Kitt Peak	Spacewatch	AST	1.6 km	MPC · JPL
419126	2009 SK_{231}	—	September 19, 2009	Kitt Peak	Spacewatch	·	2.1 km	MPC · JPL
419127	2009 SX_{232}	—	September 19, 2009	Catalina	CSS	·	1.9 km	MPC · JPL
419128	2009 SB_{239}	—	August 16, 2009	Catalina	CSS	·	2.2 km	MPC · JPL
419129	2009 SU_{240}	—	September 18, 2009	Catalina	CSS	·	2.2 km	MPC · JPL
419130	2009 SK_{242}	—	July 8, 2004	Siding Spring	SSS	DOR	2.3 km	MPC · JPL
419131	2009 SZ_{242}	—	September 21, 2009	La Sagra	OAM	·	1.9 km	MPC · JPL
419132	2009 SC_{245}	—	September 19, 2009	Kitt Peak	Spacewatch	·	2.3 km	MPC · JPL
419133	2009 SO_{246}	—	September 17, 2009	Kitt Peak	Spacewatch	EUN	1.3 km	MPC · JPL
419134	2009 ST_{250}	—	September 19, 2009	Kitt Peak	Spacewatch	·	1.8 km	MPC · JPL
419135	2009 SX_{264}	—	September 23, 2009	Mount Lemmon	Mount Lemmon Survey	DOR	2.6 km	MPC · JPL
419136	2009 SR_{265}	—	September 23, 2009	Mount Lemmon	Mount Lemmon Survey	·	2.0 km	MPC · JPL
419137	2009 SV_{265}	—	September 17, 2004	Kitt Peak	Spacewatch	·	4.5 km	MPC · JPL
419138	2009 SH_{269}	—	September 12, 2009	Kitt Peak	Spacewatch	·	1.7 km	MPC · JPL
419139	2009 SV_{274}	—	September 17, 2009	Kitt Peak	Spacewatch	·	2.9 km	MPC · JPL
419140	2009 SZ_{278}	—	September 17, 2009	Kitt Peak	Spacewatch	·	1.6 km	MPC · JPL
419141	2009 SD_{279}	—	September 17, 2009	Kitt Peak	Spacewatch	·	1.7 km	MPC · JPL
419142	2009 SU_{282}	—	September 25, 2009	Kitt Peak	Spacewatch	·	1.9 km	MPC · JPL
419143	2009 SX_{287}	—	September 25, 2009	Kitt Peak	Spacewatch	·	2.0 km	MPC · JPL
419144	2009 SK_{288}	—	September 25, 2009	Kitt Peak	Spacewatch	·	2.2 km	MPC · JPL
419145	2009 SF_{290}	—	December 29, 2005	Mount Lemmon	Mount Lemmon Survey	AGN	1.0 km	MPC · JPL
419146	2009 SC_{294}	—	September 27, 2009	Kitt Peak	Spacewatch	·	1.5 km	MPC · JPL
419147	2009 SD_{294}	—	September 15, 2009	Kitt Peak	Spacewatch	NEM	2.1 km	MPC · JPL
419148	2009 SA_{302}	—	August 15, 2009	Kitt Peak	Spacewatch	·	3.1 km	MPC · JPL
419149	2009 SQ_{316}	—	February 6, 2002	Kitt Peak	Spacewatch	AST	1.4 km	MPC · JPL
419150	2009 SG_{319}	—	September 20, 2009	Kitt Peak	Spacewatch	AGN	1.1 km	MPC · JPL
419151	2009 SJ_{324}	—	May 22, 2003	Kitt Peak	Spacewatch	·	1.8 km	MPC · JPL
419152	2009 SC_{325}	—	September 25, 2009	Kitt Peak	Spacewatch	WIT	900 m	MPC · JPL
419153	2009 SB_{329}	—	September 16, 2009	Catalina	CSS	·	1.7 km	MPC · JPL
419154	2009 SO_{335}	—	September 20, 2009	Kitt Peak	Spacewatch	·	1.8 km	MPC · JPL
419155	2009 SD_{337}	—	September 25, 2009	Catalina	CSS	·	2.1 km	MPC · JPL
419156	2009 SM_{337}	—	September 27, 2009	Catalina	CSS	·	1.6 km	MPC · JPL
419157	2009 SN_{337}	—	September 27, 2009	Siding Spring	SSS	(1547)	1.8 km	MPC · JPL
419158	2009 SC_{341}	—	September 23, 2009	Kitt Peak	Spacewatch	·	1.7 km	MPC · JPL
419159	2009 ST_{344}	—	September 18, 2009	Kitt Peak	Spacewatch	·	3.5 km	MPC · JPL
419160	2009 SZ_{344}	—	September 18, 2009	Kitt Peak	Spacewatch	AGN	1.1 km	MPC · JPL
419161	2009 SK_{354}	—	September 21, 2009	Mount Lemmon	Mount Lemmon Survey	·	2.2 km	MPC · JPL
419162	2009 SY_{354}	—	September 29, 2009	Kitt Peak	Spacewatch	·	1.9 km	MPC · JPL
419163	2009 SY_{357}	—	September 28, 2009	Mount Lemmon	Mount Lemmon Survey	·	3.7 km	MPC · JPL
419164	2009 SU_{359}	—	September 25, 2009	Socorro	LINEAR	EUN	1.9 km	MPC · JPL
419165	2009 SA_{361}	—	September 22, 2009	Catalina	CSS	·	1.8 km	MPC · JPL
419166	2009 TB_{5}	—	October 10, 2009	La Sagra	OAM	·	2.0 km	MPC · JPL
419167	2009 TQ_{5}	—	October 11, 2009	Mount Lemmon	Mount Lemmon Survey	·	1.4 km	MPC · JPL
419168	2009 TV_{5}	—	October 11, 2009	La Sagra	OAM	·	1.9 km	MPC · JPL
419169	2009 TP_{9}	—	October 14, 2009	Bisei SG Center	BATTeRS	·	2.2 km	MPC · JPL
419170	2009 TK_{13}	—	October 14, 2009	Bisei SG Center	BATTeRS	·	1.3 km	MPC · JPL
419171	2009 TG_{20}	—	September 22, 2009	Catalina	CSS	·	2.2 km	MPC · JPL
419172	2009 TX_{25}	—	October 14, 2009	Catalina	CSS	·	2.0 km	MPC · JPL
419173	2009 TY_{29}	—	April 23, 2007	Mount Lemmon	Mount Lemmon Survey	JUN	1.1 km	MPC · JPL
419174	2009 TA_{31}	—	October 15, 2009	Mount Lemmon	Mount Lemmon Survey	·	1.4 km	MPC · JPL
419175	2009 TP_{32}	—	October 14, 2009	Catalina	CSS	NAE	4.2 km	MPC · JPL
419176	2009 TH_{33}	—	October 12, 2009	La Sagra	OAM	·	2.4 km	MPC · JPL
419177	2009 TK_{33}	—	October 14, 2009	La Sagra	OAM	·	2.0 km	MPC · JPL
419178	2009 TU_{33}	—	October 9, 2009	Catalina	CSS	DOR	2.4 km	MPC · JPL
419179	2009 TJ_{39}	—	October 15, 2009	Catalina	CSS	·	2.7 km	MPC · JPL
419180	2009 TM_{40}	—	December 1, 2005	Kitt Peak	Spacewatch	·	2.3 km	MPC · JPL
419181	2009 TN_{40}	—	October 15, 2009	Catalina	CSS	·	2.5 km	MPC · JPL
419182	2009 TN_{42}	—	October 12, 2009	Mount Lemmon	Mount Lemmon Survey	·	2.3 km	MPC · JPL
419183	2009 TL_{43}	—	October 1, 2009	Mount Lemmon	Mount Lemmon Survey	·	4.3 km	MPC · JPL
419184	2009 TF_{47}	—	October 14, 2009	Catalina	CSS	·	3.2 km	MPC · JPL
419185	2009 UP_{2}	—	August 18, 2009	Catalina	CSS	·	3.7 km	MPC · JPL
419186	2009 UY_{11}	—	October 16, 2009	Catalina	CSS	·	2.1 km	MPC · JPL
419187	2009 UA_{24}	—	October 18, 2009	Mount Lemmon	Mount Lemmon Survey	·	2.1 km	MPC · JPL
419188	2009 UP_{27}	—	August 25, 2004	Kitt Peak	Spacewatch	·	1.9 km	MPC · JPL
419189	2009 UG_{28}	—	October 22, 2009	Mount Lemmon	Mount Lemmon Survey	KOR	1.1 km	MPC · JPL
419190	2009 UX_{30}	—	October 18, 2009	Mount Lemmon	Mount Lemmon Survey	·	3.2 km	MPC · JPL
419191	2009 UA_{33}	—	October 18, 2009	Mount Lemmon	Mount Lemmon Survey	(32418)	2.4 km	MPC · JPL
419192	2009 UM_{37}	—	October 22, 2009	Mount Lemmon	Mount Lemmon Survey	KOR	1.3 km	MPC · JPL
419193	2009 UT_{40}	—	August 20, 2009	Kitt Peak	Spacewatch	·	1.9 km	MPC · JPL
419194	2009 UZ_{49}	—	September 27, 2009	Kitt Peak	Spacewatch	AGN	1.5 km	MPC · JPL
419195	2009 UY_{50}	—	October 22, 2009	Catalina	CSS	·	1.5 km	MPC · JPL
419196	2009 UZ_{56}	—	October 23, 2009	Mount Lemmon	Mount Lemmon Survey	·	1.7 km	MPC · JPL
419197	2009 UA_{66}	—	September 17, 2009	Kitt Peak	Spacewatch	·	2.7 km	MPC · JPL
419198	2009 UO_{66}	—	October 17, 2009	Mount Lemmon	Mount Lemmon Survey	·	2.8 km	MPC · JPL
419199	2009 UZ_{69}	—	October 22, 2009	Mount Lemmon	Mount Lemmon Survey	H	600 m	MPC · JPL
419200	2009 UT_{80}	—	September 29, 2009	Mount Lemmon	Mount Lemmon Survey	·	1.5 km	MPC · JPL

== 419201–419300 ==
back to top

Designation			Discovery			Properties		Ref
Permanent	Provisional	Named after	Date	Site	Discoverer(s)	Category	Diam.	Ref
419201	2009 UW_{82}	—	October 23, 2009	Mount Lemmon	Mount Lemmon Survey	·	1.8 km	MPC · JPL
419202	2009 UV_{84}	—	October 23, 2009	Mount Lemmon	Mount Lemmon Survey	·	1.7 km	MPC · JPL
419203	2009 UN_{90}	—	October 16, 2009	Catalina	CSS	EUN	1.5 km	MPC · JPL
419204	2009 UC_{96}	—	October 22, 2009	Mount Lemmon	Mount Lemmon Survey	KOR	1.3 km	MPC · JPL
419205	2009 UN_{99}	—	October 23, 2009	Kitt Peak	Spacewatch	·	2.5 km	MPC · JPL
419206	2009 UQ_{101}	—	January 6, 2006	Catalina	CSS	·	2.7 km	MPC · JPL
419207	2009 UH_{103}	—	October 24, 2009	Kitt Peak	Spacewatch	·	1.4 km	MPC · JPL
419208	2009 UU_{107}	—	September 17, 2009	Catalina	CSS	·	1.7 km	MPC · JPL
419209	2009 UJ_{110}	—	October 23, 2009	Kitt Peak	Spacewatch	DOR	2.7 km	MPC · JPL
419210	2009 UD_{113}	—	October 22, 2009	Catalina	CSS	·	2.4 km	MPC · JPL
419211	2009 UJ_{113}	—	October 21, 2009	Mount Lemmon	Mount Lemmon Survey	NEM	2.0 km	MPC · JPL
419212	2009 UY_{117}	—	October 14, 2009	XuYi	PMO NEO Survey Program	EOS	4.1 km	MPC · JPL
419213	2009 UB_{130}	—	October 29, 2009	La Sagra	OAM	·	1.7 km	MPC · JPL
419214	2009 UO_{132}	—	October 16, 2009	Catalina	CSS	·	2.5 km	MPC · JPL
419215	2009 UR_{133}	—	October 22, 2009	Mount Lemmon	Mount Lemmon Survey	HOF	2.0 km	MPC · JPL
419216	2009 UY_{134}	—	August 6, 2004	Palomar	NEAT	·	2.1 km	MPC · JPL
419217	2009 UQ_{137}	—	December 2, 2005	Kitt Peak	Spacewatch	·	2.5 km	MPC · JPL
419218	2009 UQ_{146}	—	October 26, 2009	Mount Lemmon	Mount Lemmon Survey	·	2.6 km	MPC · JPL
419219	2009 UB_{150}	—	October 27, 2009	La Sagra	OAM	·	3.5 km	MPC · JPL
419220	2009 UN_{151}	—	October 16, 2009	Mount Lemmon	Mount Lemmon Survey	·	1.9 km	MPC · JPL
419221	2009 UY_{151}	—	October 18, 2009	Socorro	LINEAR	·	3.7 km	MPC · JPL
419222	2009 UV_{152}	—	October 22, 2009	Mount Lemmon	Mount Lemmon Survey	·	2.7 km	MPC · JPL
419223	2009 UM_{154}	—	October 16, 2009	Mount Lemmon	Mount Lemmon Survey	·	2.0 km	MPC · JPL
419224	2009 UV_{154}	—	October 23, 2009	Mount Lemmon	Mount Lemmon Survey	·	1.2 km	MPC · JPL
419225	2009 VP_{4}	—	November 8, 2009	Kitt Peak	Spacewatch	·	1.8 km	MPC · JPL
419226	2009 VF_{7}	—	October 30, 2009	Mount Lemmon	Mount Lemmon Survey	·	3.4 km	MPC · JPL
419227	2009 VL_{7}	—	November 8, 2009	Catalina	CSS	GEF	1.4 km	MPC · JPL
419228	2009 VT_{9}	—	October 23, 2009	Mount Lemmon	Mount Lemmon Survey	·	1.9 km	MPC · JPL
419229	2009 VP_{11}	—	May 12, 2007	Kitt Peak	Spacewatch	·	2.2 km	MPC · JPL
419230	2009 VB_{17}	—	November 8, 2009	Mount Lemmon	Mount Lemmon Survey	·	2.3 km	MPC · JPL
419231	2009 VO_{23}	—	November 9, 2009	Catalina	CSS	GEF	3.0 km	MPC · JPL
419232	2009 VT_{23}	—	November 9, 2009	Mount Lemmon	Mount Lemmon Survey	·	2.3 km	MPC · JPL
419233	2009 VW_{23}	—	December 20, 2004	Mount Lemmon	Mount Lemmon Survey	·	2.7 km	MPC · JPL
419234	2009 VB_{24}	—	November 9, 2009	Mount Lemmon	Mount Lemmon Survey	·	4.1 km	MPC · JPL
419235	2009 VE_{24}	—	October 26, 2009	Mount Lemmon	Mount Lemmon Survey	·	2.4 km	MPC · JPL
419236	2009 VN_{29}	—	October 24, 2009	Kitt Peak	Spacewatch	·	4.1 km	MPC · JPL
419237	2009 VX_{30}	—	November 9, 2009	Mount Lemmon	Mount Lemmon Survey	·	1.8 km	MPC · JPL
419238	2009 VO_{31}	—	October 9, 2004	Kitt Peak	Spacewatch	·	2.2 km	MPC · JPL
419239	2009 VJ_{39}	—	October 22, 2009	Catalina	CSS	·	2.1 km	MPC · JPL
419240	2009 VY_{39}	—	November 11, 2009	Kitt Peak	Spacewatch	·	2.7 km	MPC · JPL
419241	2009 VW_{41}	—	November 9, 2009	Mount Lemmon	Mount Lemmon Survey	·	1.9 km	MPC · JPL
419242	2009 VU_{42}	—	October 21, 2009	Mount Lemmon	Mount Lemmon Survey	·	2.4 km	MPC · JPL
419243	2009 VR_{43}	—	November 9, 2009	Mount Lemmon	Mount Lemmon Survey	·	3.5 km	MPC · JPL
419244	2009 VY_{47}	—	October 25, 2009	Kitt Peak	Spacewatch	·	2.5 km	MPC · JPL
419245	2009 VS_{50}	—	November 15, 2009	La Sagra	OAM	·	3.9 km	MPC · JPL
419246	2009 VP_{52}	—	October 24, 2009	Kitt Peak	Spacewatch	AGN	1.1 km	MPC · JPL
419247	2009 VO_{59}	—	October 14, 2009	Mount Lemmon	Mount Lemmon Survey	·	3.0 km	MPC · JPL
419248	2009 VT_{61}	—	November 8, 2009	Kitt Peak	Spacewatch	·	5.2 km	MPC · JPL
419249	2009 VJ_{62}	—	September 20, 2009	Mount Lemmon	Mount Lemmon Survey	·	3.5 km	MPC · JPL
419250	2009 VP_{62}	—	November 8, 2009	Kitt Peak	Spacewatch	·	3.9 km	MPC · JPL
419251	2009 VS_{63}	—	November 8, 2009	Mount Lemmon	Mount Lemmon Survey	·	1.8 km	MPC · JPL
419252	2009 VD_{64}	—	October 16, 2009	Mount Lemmon	Mount Lemmon Survey	BRA	1.7 km	MPC · JPL
419253	2009 VB_{68}	—	April 14, 2007	Kitt Peak	Spacewatch	·	2.3 km	MPC · JPL
419254	2009 VE_{70}	—	November 9, 2009	Mount Lemmon	Mount Lemmon Survey	·	2.2 km	MPC · JPL
419255	2009 VW_{77}	—	November 9, 2009	Catalina	CSS	·	6.5 km	MPC · JPL
419256	2009 VP_{81}	—	October 24, 2009	Kitt Peak	Spacewatch	BRA	1.5 km	MPC · JPL
419257	2009 VK_{85}	—	October 5, 2003	Kitt Peak	Spacewatch	THM	1.7 km	MPC · JPL
419258	2009 VP_{87}	—	November 10, 2009	Kitt Peak	Spacewatch	·	3.1 km	MPC · JPL
419259	2009 VX_{92}	—	November 11, 2009	Catalina	CSS	·	2.4 km	MPC · JPL
419260	2009 VA_{94}	—	October 14, 2009	Mount Lemmon	Mount Lemmon Survey	·	1.8 km	MPC · JPL
419261	2009 VT_{94}	—	November 9, 2009	Kitt Peak	Spacewatch	KOR	1.2 km	MPC · JPL
419262	2009 VT_{99}	—	October 17, 2009	Mount Lemmon	Mount Lemmon Survey	·	3.1 km	MPC · JPL
419263	2009 VH_{100}	—	November 10, 2009	Kitt Peak	Spacewatch	·	3.8 km	MPC · JPL
419264	2009 VX_{101}	—	October 26, 2009	Kitt Peak	Spacewatch	·	1.7 km	MPC · JPL
419265	2009 VU_{105}	—	July 15, 2004	Siding Spring	SSS	·	2.4 km	MPC · JPL
419266	2009 VR_{108}	—	November 9, 2009	Catalina	CSS	·	2.2 km	MPC · JPL
419267	2009 VS_{109}	—	November 9, 2009	Catalina	CSS	·	2.6 km	MPC · JPL
419268	2009 VW_{110}	—	November 10, 2009	Mount Lemmon	Mount Lemmon Survey	·	4.3 km	MPC · JPL
419269	2009 VU_{112}	—	November 8, 2009	Mount Lemmon	Mount Lemmon Survey	·	2.4 km	MPC · JPL
419270	2009 VS_{114}	—	November 11, 2009	Mount Lemmon	Mount Lemmon Survey	·	2.8 km	MPC · JPL
419271	2009 VX_{115}	—	November 8, 2009	Kitt Peak	Spacewatch	·	2.4 km	MPC · JPL
419272	2009 WC_{1}	—	November 17, 2009	Kitt Peak	Spacewatch	H	620 m	MPC · JPL
419273	2009 WN_{3}	—	October 23, 2009	Mount Lemmon	Mount Lemmon Survey	EOS	1.5 km	MPC · JPL
419274	2009 WY_{3}	—	March 10, 2007	Mount Lemmon	Mount Lemmon Survey	NYS	1.0 km	MPC · JPL
419275	2009 WE_{10}	—	November 19, 2009	Socorro	LINEAR	·	3.3 km	MPC · JPL
419276	2009 WW_{10}	—	November 18, 2009	Dauban	Kugel, F.	DOR	2.5 km	MPC · JPL
419277	2009 WU_{11}	—	September 22, 2009	Mount Lemmon	Mount Lemmon Survey	KOR	1.1 km	MPC · JPL
419278	2009 WD_{12}	—	October 22, 2009	Mount Lemmon	Mount Lemmon Survey	KOR	1.2 km	MPC · JPL
419279	2009 WL_{12}	—	October 22, 2009	Mount Lemmon	Mount Lemmon Survey	·	1.3 km	MPC · JPL
419280	2009 WT_{12}	—	February 1, 2006	Kitt Peak	Spacewatch	KOR	1.0 km	MPC · JPL
419281	2009 WB_{15}	—	November 16, 2009	Mount Lemmon	Mount Lemmon Survey	·	2.5 km	MPC · JPL
419282	2009 WV_{15}	—	November 16, 2009	Mount Lemmon	Mount Lemmon Survey	·	3.9 km	MPC · JPL
419283	2009 WM_{21}	—	October 12, 2009	Mount Lemmon	Mount Lemmon Survey	·	2.1 km	MPC · JPL
419284	2009 WM_{22}	—	November 18, 2009	Kitt Peak	Spacewatch	·	5.0 km	MPC · JPL
419285	2009 WW_{23}	—	November 16, 2009	Mayhill	Evdokimova, E.	·	1.8 km	MPC · JPL
419286	2009 WN_{24}	—	October 23, 2009	Mount Lemmon	Mount Lemmon Survey	EOS	2.1 km	MPC · JPL
419287	2009 WQ_{28}	—	October 17, 2009	Mount Lemmon	Mount Lemmon Survey	·	2.3 km	MPC · JPL
419288	2009 WR_{30}	—	November 16, 2009	Kitt Peak	Spacewatch	·	1.8 km	MPC · JPL
419289	2009 WD_{31}	—	November 16, 2009	Kitt Peak	Spacewatch	THM	2.0 km	MPC · JPL
419290	2009 WB_{33}	—	November 16, 2009	Kitt Peak	Spacewatch	·	2.2 km	MPC · JPL
419291	2009 WQ_{33}	—	November 29, 1999	Kitt Peak	Spacewatch	·	1.9 km	MPC · JPL
419292	2009 WV_{33}	—	November 8, 2009	Kitt Peak	Spacewatch	·	2.1 km	MPC · JPL
419293	2009 WH_{34}	—	November 16, 2009	Kitt Peak	Spacewatch	·	2.6 km	MPC · JPL
419294	2009 WR_{34}	—	November 16, 2009	Kitt Peak	Spacewatch	EOS	2.0 km	MPC · JPL
419295	2009 WG_{35}	—	September 19, 2009	Kitt Peak	Spacewatch	·	1.4 km	MPC · JPL
419296	2009 WX_{35}	—	November 17, 2009	Kitt Peak	Spacewatch	KOR	1.2 km	MPC · JPL
419297	2009 WK_{40}	—	November 8, 2009	Mount Lemmon	Mount Lemmon Survey	KOR	1.4 km	MPC · JPL
419298	2009 WQ_{41}	—	November 17, 2009	Kitt Peak	Spacewatch	·	1.5 km	MPC · JPL
419299	2009 WX_{42}	—	November 17, 2009	Catalina	CSS	·	2.8 km	MPC · JPL
419300	2009 WA_{47}	—	October 24, 2009	Mount Lemmon	Mount Lemmon Survey	·	2.4 km	MPC · JPL

== 419301–419400 ==
back to top

Designation			Discovery			Properties		Ref
Permanent	Provisional	Named after	Date	Site	Discoverer(s)	Category	Diam.	Ref
419301	2009 WG_{47}	—	November 18, 2009	La Sagra	OAM	·	2.8 km	MPC · JPL
419302	2009 WE_{48}	—	November 19, 2009	Kitt Peak	Spacewatch	·	1.5 km	MPC · JPL
419303	2009 WC_{49}	—	November 19, 2009	Kitt Peak	Spacewatch	·	3.0 km	MPC · JPL
419304	2009 WV_{50}	—	November 20, 2009	Kitt Peak	Spacewatch	·	2.8 km	MPC · JPL
419305	2009 WO_{59}	—	December 29, 2005	Mount Lemmon	Mount Lemmon Survey	AGN	1.4 km	MPC · JPL
419306	2009 WN_{61}	—	December 30, 2005	Kitt Peak	Spacewatch	·	1.7 km	MPC · JPL
419307	2009 WL_{66}	—	October 23, 2009	Mount Lemmon	Mount Lemmon Survey	·	2.2 km	MPC · JPL
419308	2009 WQ_{71}	—	November 18, 2009	Kitt Peak	Spacewatch	·	2.1 km	MPC · JPL
419309	2009 WM_{72}	—	November 18, 2009	Kitt Peak	Spacewatch	·	1.6 km	MPC · JPL
419310	2009 WN_{74}	—	November 10, 2009	Kitt Peak	Spacewatch	·	3.3 km	MPC · JPL
419311	2009 WS_{75}	—	November 18, 2009	Kitt Peak	Spacewatch	·	3.1 km	MPC · JPL
419312	2009 WZ_{75}	—	November 18, 2009	Kitt Peak	Spacewatch	·	1.7 km	MPC · JPL
419313	2009 WZ_{79}	—	November 18, 2009	Kitt Peak	Spacewatch	H	540 m	MPC · JPL
419314	2009 WN_{82}	—	November 19, 2009	Kitt Peak	Spacewatch	·	2.1 km	MPC · JPL
419315	2009 WH_{83}	—	November 9, 2009	Mount Lemmon	Mount Lemmon Survey	·	2.0 km	MPC · JPL
419316	2009 WJ_{83}	—	November 19, 2009	Kitt Peak	Spacewatch	·	2.9 km	MPC · JPL
419317	2009 WN_{85}	—	November 19, 2009	Kitt Peak	Spacewatch	(21885)	2.4 km	MPC · JPL
419318	2009 WM_{87}	—	November 19, 2009	Kitt Peak	Spacewatch	·	2.5 km	MPC · JPL
419319	2009 WS_{90}	—	October 12, 2009	Mount Lemmon	Mount Lemmon Survey	·	2.3 km	MPC · JPL
419320	2009 WY_{93}	—	September 19, 2003	Kitt Peak	Spacewatch	EOS	2.3 km	MPC · JPL
419321	2009 WG_{96}	—	November 8, 2009	Kitt Peak	Spacewatch	·	1.6 km	MPC · JPL
419322	2009 WO_{101}	—	November 22, 2009	Catalina	CSS	·	2.3 km	MPC · JPL
419323	2009 WU_{104}	—	September 18, 2003	Kitt Peak	Spacewatch	·	3.0 km	MPC · JPL
419324	2009 WV_{104}	—	November 8, 2009	Catalina	CSS	EOS	2.5 km	MPC · JPL
419325	2009 WY_{110}	—	April 11, 2007	Catalina	CSS	·	2.5 km	MPC · JPL
419326	2009 WR_{119}	—	November 20, 2009	Kitt Peak	Spacewatch	·	2.8 km	MPC · JPL
419327	2009 WR_{128}	—	November 3, 2004	Kitt Peak	Spacewatch	KOR	1 km	MPC · JPL
419328	2009 WZ_{131}	—	August 27, 2009	Kitt Peak	Spacewatch	·	2.0 km	MPC · JPL
419329	2009 WX_{133}	—	October 27, 2009	Kitt Peak	Spacewatch	·	1.7 km	MPC · JPL
419330	2009 WO_{134}	—	November 22, 2009	Catalina	CSS	·	2.4 km	MPC · JPL
419331	2009 WE_{149}	—	November 19, 2009	Mount Lemmon	Mount Lemmon Survey	·	4.9 km	MPC · JPL
419332	2009 WW_{156}	—	January 27, 2006	Mount Lemmon	Mount Lemmon Survey	·	1.7 km	MPC · JPL
419333	2009 WW_{160}	—	November 21, 2009	Kitt Peak	Spacewatch	KOR	1.3 km	MPC · JPL
419334	2009 WC_{161}	—	November 21, 2009	Mount Lemmon	Mount Lemmon Survey	EOS	3.0 km	MPC · JPL
419335	2009 WS_{164}	—	November 24, 2003	Anderson Mesa	LONEOS	·	3.8 km	MPC · JPL
419336	2009 WF_{166}	—	April 20, 2007	Kitt Peak	Spacewatch	·	2.0 km	MPC · JPL
419337	2009 WT_{169}	—	November 22, 2009	Kitt Peak	Spacewatch	·	4.8 km	MPC · JPL
419338	2009 WN_{171}	—	October 18, 2003	Kitt Peak	Spacewatch	EOS	2.1 km	MPC · JPL
419339	2009 WN_{172}	—	November 9, 2009	Catalina	CSS	·	1.8 km	MPC · JPL
419340	2009 WN_{176}	—	November 23, 2009	Kitt Peak	Spacewatch	EOS	2.0 km	MPC · JPL
419341	2009 WH_{177}	—	November 23, 2009	Kitt Peak	Spacewatch	·	2.3 km	MPC · JPL
419342	2009 WX_{180}	—	January 7, 2006	Kitt Peak	Spacewatch	·	2.2 km	MPC · JPL
419343	2009 WP_{181}	—	November 23, 2009	Kitt Peak	Spacewatch	·	5.1 km	MPC · JPL
419344	2009 WE_{182}	—	November 23, 2009	Kitt Peak	Spacewatch	·	2.3 km	MPC · JPL
419345	2009 WJ_{185}	—	September 20, 2003	Kitt Peak	Spacewatch	·	2.9 km	MPC · JPL
419346	2009 WT_{185}	—	November 24, 2009	Mount Lemmon	Mount Lemmon Survey	·	1.9 km	MPC · JPL
419347	2009 WS_{186}	—	November 24, 2009	Mount Lemmon	Mount Lemmon Survey	·	3.7 km	MPC · JPL
419348	2009 WS_{187}	—	October 3, 2003	Kitt Peak	Spacewatch	·	5.0 km	MPC · JPL
419349	2009 WO_{198}	—	November 26, 2009	Mount Lemmon	Mount Lemmon Survey	·	2.1 km	MPC · JPL
419350	2009 WQ_{200}	—	November 26, 2009	Mount Lemmon	Mount Lemmon Survey	EOS	1.7 km	MPC · JPL
419351	2009 WM_{208}	—	October 26, 2009	Mount Lemmon	Mount Lemmon Survey	·	2.6 km	MPC · JPL
419352	2009 WB_{209}	—	November 17, 2009	Kitt Peak	Spacewatch	·	1.5 km	MPC · JPL
419353	2009 WN_{209}	—	November 9, 2009	Kitt Peak	Spacewatch	·	4.1 km	MPC · JPL
419354	2009 WN_{215}	—	September 15, 2009	Kitt Peak	Spacewatch	·	2.9 km	MPC · JPL
419355	2009 WE_{222}	—	December 25, 2005	Mount Lemmon	Mount Lemmon Survey	KOR	1.3 km	MPC · JPL
419356	2009 WO_{224}	—	November 22, 2000	Kitt Peak	Spacewatch	·	2.5 km	MPC · JPL
419357	2009 WV_{249}	—	November 17, 2009	Kitt Peak	Spacewatch	·	3.4 km	MPC · JPL
419358	2009 WE_{250}	—	November 17, 2009	Kitt Peak	Spacewatch	·	2.3 km	MPC · JPL
419359	2009 WA_{254}	—	November 9, 2009	Mount Lemmon	Mount Lemmon Survey	EOS	2.0 km	MPC · JPL
419360	2009 WB_{257}	—	August 28, 2009	Kitt Peak	Spacewatch	EOS	2.0 km	MPC · JPL
419361	2009 WA_{260}	—	November 21, 2009	Kitt Peak	Spacewatch	KOR	1.3 km	MPC · JPL
419362	2009 WD_{260}	—	November 21, 2009	Mount Lemmon	Mount Lemmon Survey	·	2.7 km	MPC · JPL
419363	2009 WL_{260}	—	November 25, 2009	Mount Lemmon	Mount Lemmon Survey	·	3.7 km	MPC · JPL
419364	2009 WE_{264}	—	November 16, 2009	Mount Lemmon	Mount Lemmon Survey	·	4.6 km	MPC · JPL
419365	2009 XF_{1}	—	December 10, 2009	Mayhill	Mayhill	·	2.4 km	MPC · JPL
419366	2009 XP_{1}	—	December 10, 2009	Mayhill	Nevski, V.	·	4.8 km	MPC · JPL
419367	2009 XQ_{3}	—	December 9, 2009	La Sagra	OAM	·	3.0 km	MPC · JPL
419368	2009 XL_{4}	—	December 10, 2009	Mount Lemmon	Mount Lemmon Survey	·	3.7 km	MPC · JPL
419369	2009 XT_{8}	—	November 27, 2009	Mount Lemmon	Mount Lemmon Survey	·	2.5 km	MPC · JPL
419370	2009 XU_{12}	—	December 11, 1998	Kitt Peak	Spacewatch	·	3.1 km	MPC · JPL
419371	2009 XJ_{13}	—	December 11, 2009	Mount Lemmon	Mount Lemmon Survey	·	1.8 km	MPC · JPL
419372	2009 XC_{14}	—	October 26, 2009	Kitt Peak	Spacewatch	·	3.9 km	MPC · JPL
419373	2009 XO_{14}	—	December 15, 2009	Mount Lemmon	Mount Lemmon Survey	·	5.0 km	MPC · JPL
419374	2009 XB_{16}	—	December 15, 2009	Mount Lemmon	Mount Lemmon Survey	·	4.3 km	MPC · JPL
419375	2009 XK_{16}	—	December 15, 2009	Mount Lemmon	Mount Lemmon Survey	·	3.0 km	MPC · JPL
419376	2009 XJ_{21}	—	December 10, 2009	Mount Lemmon	Mount Lemmon Survey	VER	3.8 km	MPC · JPL
419377	2009 YR_{2}	—	December 17, 2009	Mount Lemmon	Mount Lemmon Survey	·	2.6 km	MPC · JPL
419378	2009 YP_{5}	—	December 17, 2009	Mount Lemmon	Mount Lemmon Survey	·	2.3 km	MPC · JPL
419379	2009 YN_{9}	—	November 19, 2009	Mount Lemmon	Mount Lemmon Survey	·	3.1 km	MPC · JPL
419380	2009 YT_{9}	—	December 17, 2009	Mount Lemmon	Mount Lemmon Survey	·	4.2 km	MPC · JPL
419381	2009 YX_{11}	—	December 18, 2009	Mount Lemmon	Mount Lemmon Survey	·	3.0 km	MPC · JPL
419382	2009 YM_{12}	—	December 18, 2009	Mount Lemmon	Mount Lemmon Survey	EOS	1.9 km	MPC · JPL
419383	2009 YO_{12}	—	December 18, 2009	Mount Lemmon	Mount Lemmon Survey	·	2.4 km	MPC · JPL
419384	2009 YU_{12}	—	December 18, 2009	Mount Lemmon	Mount Lemmon Survey	EOS	1.6 km	MPC · JPL
419385	2009 YA_{21}	—	November 11, 2009	Mount Lemmon	Mount Lemmon Survey	·	2.8 km	MPC · JPL
419386	2009 YM_{21}	—	December 27, 2009	Kitt Peak	Spacewatch	VER	3.7 km	MPC · JPL
419387	2009 YT_{21}	—	December 27, 2009	Kitt Peak	Spacewatch	·	3.0 km	MPC · JPL
419388	2009 YM_{22}	—	November 21, 2009	Mount Lemmon	Mount Lemmon Survey	·	2.4 km	MPC · JPL
419389	2010 AA_{6}	—	November 25, 2009	Kitt Peak	Spacewatch	·	5.0 km	MPC · JPL
419390	2010 AT_{10}	—	December 19, 2009	Mount Lemmon	Mount Lemmon Survey	·	2.8 km	MPC · JPL
419391	2010 AO_{11}	—	January 6, 2010	Mount Lemmon	Mount Lemmon Survey	·	4.2 km	MPC · JPL
419392	2010 AA_{12}	—	October 18, 2009	Mount Lemmon	Mount Lemmon Survey	VER	4.0 km	MPC · JPL
419393	2010 AO_{13}	—	January 7, 2010	Kitt Peak	Spacewatch	·	1.5 km	MPC · JPL
419394	2010 AN_{22}	—	January 6, 2010	Kitt Peak	Spacewatch	THM	2.4 km	MPC · JPL
419395	2010 AA_{26}	—	January 6, 2010	Kitt Peak	Spacewatch	(3460)	3.4 km	MPC · JPL
419396	2010 AZ_{30}	—	December 18, 2009	Mount Lemmon	Mount Lemmon Survey	·	2.5 km	MPC · JPL
419397	2010 AD_{32}	—	January 6, 2010	Kitt Peak	Spacewatch	·	3.9 km	MPC · JPL
419398	2010 AV_{33}	—	January 7, 2010	Kitt Peak	Spacewatch	VER	3.7 km	MPC · JPL
419399	2010 AK_{35}	—	January 7, 2010	Kitt Peak	Spacewatch	·	4.3 km	MPC · JPL
419400	2010 AE_{38}	—	December 19, 2009	Mount Lemmon	Mount Lemmon Survey	H	790 m	MPC · JPL

== 419401–419500 ==
back to top

Designation			Discovery			Properties		Ref
Permanent	Provisional	Named after	Date	Site	Discoverer(s)	Category	Diam.	Ref
419401	2010 AU_{38}	—	January 8, 2010	Kitt Peak	Spacewatch	H	640 m	MPC · JPL
419402	2010 AY_{39}	—	January 7, 2010	Socorro	LINEAR	·	3.6 km	MPC · JPL
419403	2010 AY_{41}	—	January 6, 2010	Catalina	CSS	H	670 m	MPC · JPL
419404	2010 AM_{44}	—	January 7, 2010	Kitt Peak	Spacewatch	·	2.7 km	MPC · JPL
419405	2010 AX_{48}	—	January 8, 2010	Kitt Peak	Spacewatch	EOS	2.5 km	MPC · JPL
419406	2010 AG_{55}	—	January 8, 2010	Kitt Peak	Spacewatch	·	3.1 km	MPC · JPL
419407	2010 AC_{59}	—	September 29, 2009	Mount Lemmon	Mount Lemmon Survey	T_{j} (2.99)	3.8 km	MPC · JPL
419408	2010 AS_{59}	—	January 6, 2010	Catalina	CSS	·	1.9 km	MPC · JPL
419409	2010 AT_{64}	—	January 10, 2010	Kitt Peak	Spacewatch	·	5.6 km	MPC · JPL
419410	2010 AR_{66}	—	January 11, 2010	Kitt Peak	Spacewatch	·	2.9 km	MPC · JPL
419411	2010 AV_{66}	—	January 11, 2010	Kitt Peak	Spacewatch	·	3.0 km	MPC · JPL
419412	2010 AM_{67}	—	January 12, 2010	Kitt Peak	Spacewatch	·	3.3 km	MPC · JPL
419413	2010 AK_{70}	—	March 12, 2005	Socorro	LINEAR	·	4.1 km	MPC · JPL
419414	2010 AS_{74}	—	January 13, 2010	Socorro	LINEAR	·	5.1 km	MPC · JPL
419415	2010 AF_{78}	—	October 30, 2009	Mount Lemmon	Mount Lemmon Survey	DOR	3.5 km	MPC · JPL
419416	2010 AN_{79}	—	January 8, 2010	Kitt Peak	Spacewatch	·	3.3 km	MPC · JPL
419417	2010 AY_{79}	—	January 13, 2010	Catalina	CSS	·	2.7 km	MPC · JPL
419418	2010 AF_{81}	—	January 7, 2010	Kitt Peak	Spacewatch	T_{j} (2.98)	5.8 km	MPC · JPL
419419	2010 AR_{103}	—	January 12, 2010	WISE	WISE	·	3.9 km	MPC · JPL
419420	2010 AY_{103}	—	February 14, 2010	Mount Lemmon	Mount Lemmon Survey	·	3.7 km	MPC · JPL
419421	2010 AC_{116}	—	December 27, 2005	Kitt Peak	Spacewatch	·	2.3 km	MPC · JPL
419422	2010 BA	—	January 16, 2010	Bisei SG Center	BATTeRS	THM	2.2 km	MPC · JPL
419423	2010 BA_{3}	—	January 19, 2010	Črni Vrh	J. Zakrajšek, B. Mikuž	·	5.3 km	MPC · JPL
419424	2010 BB_{6}	—	January 20, 2010	Siding Spring	SSS	THB	4.2 km	MPC · JPL
419425	2010 BC_{6}	—	January 20, 2010	Siding Spring	SSS	·	2.1 km	MPC · JPL
419426	2010 BU_{6}	—	January 16, 2010	WISE	WISE	·	4.7 km	MPC · JPL
419427	2010 BD_{8}	—	January 16, 2010	WISE	WISE	·	5.7 km	MPC · JPL
419428	2010 BR_{59}	—	October 24, 2009	Kitt Peak	Spacewatch	·	2.7 km	MPC · JPL
419429	2010 BW_{62}	—	October 21, 2009	Catalina	CSS	·	1.4 km	MPC · JPL
419430	2010 CD_{5}	—	February 8, 2010	Kitt Peak	Spacewatch	·	2.1 km	MPC · JPL
419431	2010 CC_{33}	—	February 10, 2010	Kitt Peak	Spacewatch	·	3.5 km	MPC · JPL
419432	2010 CN_{33}	—	March 8, 2005	Mount Lemmon	Mount Lemmon Survey	HYG	2.3 km	MPC · JPL
419433	2010 CL_{35}	—	February 10, 2010	Kitt Peak	Spacewatch	H	650 m	MPC · JPL
419434	2010 CY_{42}	—	February 9, 2010	Catalina	CSS	LIX	3.8 km	MPC · JPL
419435 Tiramisu	2010 CW_{43}	Tiramisu	February 14, 2010	Nogales	J.-C. Merlin	·	3.5 km	MPC · JPL
419436	2010 CT_{56}	—	February 13, 2010	Socorro	LINEAR	·	5.1 km	MPC · JPL
419437	2010 CV_{58}	—	February 13, 2010	Socorro	LINEAR	·	5.0 km	MPC · JPL
419438	2010 CP_{73}	—	September 23, 2008	Catalina	CSS	·	4.5 km	MPC · JPL
419439	2010 CP_{74}	—	January 13, 2005	Kitt Peak	Spacewatch	·	2.2 km	MPC · JPL
419440	2010 CQ_{75}	—	February 13, 2010	Catalina	CSS	·	2.7 km	MPC · JPL
419441	2010 CS_{76}	—	February 13, 2010	Kitt Peak	Spacewatch	SYL · CYB	5.9 km	MPC · JPL
419442	2010 CN_{82}	—	February 13, 2010	Kitt Peak	Spacewatch	H	570 m	MPC · JPL
419443	2010 CS_{82}	—	February 13, 2010	Kitt Peak	Spacewatch	·	3.5 km	MPC · JPL
419444	2010 CN_{85}	—	February 14, 2010	Kitt Peak	Spacewatch	·	5.1 km	MPC · JPL
419445	2010 CF_{99}	—	February 14, 2010	Kitt Peak	Spacewatch	THM	2.4 km	MPC · JPL
419446	2010 CZ_{100}	—	February 14, 2010	Mount Lemmon	Mount Lemmon Survey	CYB	3.2 km	MPC · JPL
419447	2010 CX_{117}	—	February 15, 2010	Kitt Peak	Spacewatch	THM	2.2 km	MPC · JPL
419448	2010 CO_{124}	—	October 26, 2009	Kitt Peak	Spacewatch	·	3.4 km	MPC · JPL
419449	2010 CE_{128}	—	December 16, 2003	Kitt Peak	Spacewatch	·	3.4 km	MPC · JPL
419450	2010 CW_{128}	—	February 9, 2010	Catalina	CSS	THB	3.5 km	MPC · JPL
419451	2010 CJ_{129}	—	February 11, 2010	La Sagra	OAM	·	3.3 km	MPC · JPL
419452	2010 CC_{138}	—	February 9, 2010	Kitt Peak	Spacewatch	·	2.9 km	MPC · JPL
419453	2010 CN_{139}	—	February 13, 2010	Kitt Peak	Spacewatch	·	4.0 km	MPC · JPL
419454	2010 CX_{141}	—	January 6, 2010	Catalina	CSS	·	3.4 km	MPC · JPL
419455	2010 CY_{141}	—	December 20, 2009	Kitt Peak	Spacewatch	·	3.8 km	MPC · JPL
419456	2010 CJ_{142}	—	February 6, 2010	Mount Lemmon	Mount Lemmon Survey	·	3.6 km	MPC · JPL
419457	2010 CQ_{144}	—	February 13, 2010	Catalina	CSS	·	4.9 km	MPC · JPL
419458	2010 CC_{146}	—	February 15, 2010	Catalina	CSS	·	3.1 km	MPC · JPL
419459	2010 CX_{147}	—	February 13, 2010	Kitt Peak	Spacewatch	·	2.2 km	MPC · JPL
419460	2010 CJ_{148}	—	February 14, 2010	Mount Lemmon	Mount Lemmon Survey	·	2.4 km	MPC · JPL
419461	2010 CJ_{153}	—	February 14, 2010	Catalina	CSS	·	3.9 km	MPC · JPL
419462	2010 CW_{157}	—	February 15, 2010	Kitt Peak	Spacewatch	·	3.1 km	MPC · JPL
419463	2010 CX_{157}	—	February 15, 2010	Kitt Peak	Spacewatch	H	460 m	MPC · JPL
419464	2010 CC_{180}	—	February 12, 2010	La Sagra	OAM	AMO	640 m	MPC · JPL
419465	2010 CK_{180}	—	February 15, 2010	Catalina	CSS	·	3.0 km	MPC · JPL
419466	2010 CO_{181}	—	February 14, 2010	Haleakala	Pan-STARRS 1	·	3.6 km	MPC · JPL
419467	2010 CA_{182}	—	August 10, 2007	Kitt Peak	Spacewatch	·	3.4 km	MPC · JPL
419468	2010 CS_{183}	—	November 18, 2008	Catalina	CSS	·	2.6 km	MPC · JPL
419469	2010 CA_{184}	—	February 15, 2010	Catalina	CSS	·	1.6 km	MPC · JPL
419470	2010 CE_{185}	—	March 4, 2010	Catalina	CSS	·	5.4 km	MPC · JPL
419471	2010 CQ_{204}	—	August 23, 2004	Anderson Mesa	LONEOS	·	3.0 km	MPC · JPL
419472	2010 DW_{1}	—	February 17, 2010	Socorro	LINEAR	APO · PHA	460 m	MPC · JPL
419473	2010 DS_{5}	—	October 7, 2008	Mount Lemmon	Mount Lemmon Survey	·	2.1 km	MPC · JPL
419474	2010 DN_{32}	—	February 18, 2010	WISE	WISE	·	4.1 km	MPC · JPL
419475	2010 DE_{37}	—	March 20, 1999	Apache Point	SDSS	·	2.2 km	MPC · JPL
419476	2010 DY_{40}	—	February 17, 2010	Mount Lemmon	Mount Lemmon Survey	·	2.6 km	MPC · JPL
419477	2010 DD_{42}	—	February 17, 2010	Mount Lemmon	Mount Lemmon Survey	EOS	3.6 km	MPC · JPL
419478	2010 DN_{43}	—	February 17, 2010	Kitt Peak	Spacewatch	·	2.7 km	MPC · JPL
419479	2010 DS_{49}	—	February 19, 2010	Mount Lemmon	Mount Lemmon Survey	·	2.8 km	MPC · JPL
419480	2010 DC_{52}	—	February 21, 2010	WISE	WISE	·	3.0 km	MPC · JPL
419481	2010 DE_{61}	—	December 10, 2009	Mount Lemmon	Mount Lemmon Survey	·	4.6 km	MPC · JPL
419482	2010 DW_{66}	—	December 13, 2009	Mount Lemmon	Mount Lemmon Survey	·	4.5 km	MPC · JPL
419483	2010 DA_{75}	—	February 17, 2010	Kitt Peak	Spacewatch	·	5.1 km	MPC · JPL
419484	2010 EJ_{7}	—	May 8, 2006	Mount Lemmon	Mount Lemmon Survey	·	4.2 km	MPC · JPL
419485	2010 EK_{9}	—	July 30, 2008	Kitt Peak	Spacewatch	·	4.1 km	MPC · JPL
419486	2010 EK_{16}	—	March 6, 2010	WISE	WISE	·	3.2 km	MPC · JPL
419487	2010 EM_{29}	—	March 4, 2010	Kitt Peak	Spacewatch	·	2.0 km	MPC · JPL
419488	2010 EB_{30}	—	March 5, 2010	Catalina	CSS	THB	3.1 km	MPC · JPL
419489	2010 EH_{36}	—	December 20, 2009	Kitt Peak	Spacewatch	URS	5.0 km	MPC · JPL
419490	2010 ET_{43}	—	March 12, 2010	Dauban	Kugel, F.	·	3.8 km	MPC · JPL
419491	2010 EY_{45}	—	March 14, 2010	Catalina	CSS	H	620 m	MPC · JPL
419492	2010 ES_{75}	—	March 12, 2010	Kitt Peak	Spacewatch	·	3.1 km	MPC · JPL
419493	2010 EF_{105}	—	March 5, 2010	Catalina	CSS	·	2.0 km	MPC · JPL
419494	2010 EF_{108}	—	March 13, 2010	Kitt Peak	Spacewatch	·	4.0 km	MPC · JPL
419495	2010 EJ_{124}	—	March 12, 2010	Kitt Peak	Spacewatch	·	5.6 km	MPC · JPL
419496	2010 ES_{124}	—	March 12, 2010	Mount Lemmon	Mount Lemmon Survey	·	3.3 km	MPC · JPL
419497	2010 EC_{126}	—	March 13, 2010	Catalina	CSS	H	590 m	MPC · JPL
419498	2010 ES_{126}	—	March 15, 2010	La Sagra	OAM	·	3.1 km	MPC · JPL
419499	2010 EV_{127}	—	March 14, 2010	Catalina	CSS	·	4.7 km	MPC · JPL
419500	2010 EP_{140}	—	March 15, 2010	Catalina	CSS	EOS	3.2 km	MPC · JPL

== 419501–419600 ==
back to top

Designation			Discovery			Properties		Ref
Permanent	Provisional	Named after	Date	Site	Discoverer(s)	Category	Diam.	Ref
419501	2010 FZ_{25}	—	October 11, 2007	Kitt Peak	Spacewatch	·	3.4 km	MPC · JPL
419502	2010 FY_{27}	—	March 20, 2010	Catalina	CSS	·	3.8 km	MPC · JPL
419503	2010 FE_{83}	—	March 19, 2010	Kitt Peak	Spacewatch	·	3.2 km	MPC · JPL
419504	2010 FG_{83}	—	March 19, 2010	Catalina	CSS	·	4.6 km	MPC · JPL
419505	2010 FG_{98}	—	March 18, 2010	Mount Lemmon	Mount Lemmon Survey	·	2.3 km	MPC · JPL
419506	2010 GE_{11}	—	April 2, 2010	WISE	WISE	VER	3.6 km	MPC · JPL
419507	2010 GW_{27}	—	April 5, 2010	Bergisch Gladbach	W. Bickel	·	3.1 km	MPC · JPL
419508	2010 GR_{62}	—	April 12, 2010	Socorro	LINEAR	T_{j} (2.93)	3.5 km	MPC · JPL
419509	2010 GB_{66}	—	April 6, 2010	Mount Lemmon	Mount Lemmon Survey	·	2.2 km	MPC · JPL
419510	2010 GB_{113}	—	December 31, 2008	Catalina	CSS	EOS	2.4 km	MPC · JPL
419511	2010 GR_{116}	—	April 10, 2010	Mount Lemmon	Mount Lemmon Survey	·	730 m	MPC · JPL
419512	2010 GV_{145}	—	March 17, 2010	Catalina	CSS	·	2.1 km	MPC · JPL
419513	2010 GY_{163}	—	October 27, 2008	Kitt Peak	Spacewatch	·	4.4 km	MPC · JPL
419514	2010 GY_{172}	—	December 21, 2008	Socorro	LINEAR	EOS	2.7 km	MPC · JPL
419515	2010 HS_{10}	—	April 17, 2010	WISE	WISE	L5	10 km	MPC · JPL
419516	2010 HN_{14}	—	April 18, 2010	WISE	WISE	·	4.5 km	MPC · JPL
419517	2010 HU_{22}	—	June 10, 2011	Mount Lemmon	Mount Lemmon Survey	L5	10 km	MPC · JPL
419518	2010 HS_{27}	—	April 19, 2010	WISE	WISE	·	3.5 km	MPC · JPL
419519	2010 HZ_{100}	—	April 30, 2010	WISE	WISE	·	1.2 km	MPC · JPL
419520	2010 JG_{1}	—	May 5, 2010	Catalina	CSS	H	660 m	MPC · JPL
419521 Meursault	2010 JQ_{34}	Meursault	May 7, 2010	Sierra Stars	M. Ory	·	770 m	MPC · JPL
419522	2010 JU_{38}	—	October 7, 2005	Mount Lemmon	Mount Lemmon Survey	·	1 km	MPC · JPL
419523	2010 JA_{65}	—	May 8, 2010	WISE	WISE	·	3.5 km	MPC · JPL
419524	2010 JV_{80}	—	May 10, 2010	WISE	WISE	L5	8.1 km	MPC · JPL
419525	2010 JD_{82}	—	April 10, 2010	Kitt Peak	Spacewatch	·	750 m	MPC · JPL
419526	2010 JH_{123}	—	May 13, 2010	WISE	WISE	·	1.8 km	MPC · JPL
419527	2010 KN_{4}	—	May 16, 2010	WISE	WISE	·	4.3 km	MPC · JPL
419528	2010 KA_{33}	—	January 10, 1999	Kitt Peak	Spacewatch	·	4.4 km	MPC · JPL
419529	2010 KL_{73}	—	May 25, 2010	WISE	WISE	·	2.3 km	MPC · JPL
419530	2010 KF_{78}	—	May 25, 2010	WISE	WISE	·	2.7 km	MPC · JPL
419531	2010 KT_{88}	—	May 27, 2010	WISE	WISE	·	1.7 km	MPC · JPL
419532	2010 KM_{94}	—	May 27, 2010	WISE	WISE	·	1.5 km	MPC · JPL
419533	2010 KJ_{104}	—	May 29, 2010	WISE	WISE	·	5.2 km	MPC · JPL
419534	2010 KT_{117}	—	May 17, 2010	La Sagra	OAM	·	780 m	MPC · JPL
419535	2010 LS_{4}	—	June 1, 2010	WISE	WISE	·	1.1 km	MPC · JPL
419536	2010 LE_{82}	—	June 11, 2010	WISE	WISE	·	1.5 km	MPC · JPL
419537	2010 MO_{6}	—	June 16, 2010	WISE	WISE	·	1.9 km	MPC · JPL
419538	2010 MF_{14}	—	June 17, 2010	WISE	WISE	·	3.3 km	MPC · JPL
419539	2010 MA_{65}	—	June 24, 2010	WISE	WISE	NYS	1.5 km	MPC · JPL
419540	2010 NO_{3}	—	June 18, 2010	Mount Lemmon	Mount Lemmon Survey	MAS	760 m	MPC · JPL
419541	2010 NH_{6}	—	June 20, 2010	Mount Lemmon	Mount Lemmon Survey	·	1.0 km	MPC · JPL
419542	2010 NX_{21}	—	July 6, 2010	WISE	WISE	·	1.4 km	MPC · JPL
419543	2010 OC_{4}	—	July 16, 2010	WISE	WISE	·	3.1 km	MPC · JPL
419544	2010 OX_{34}	—	July 20, 2010	WISE	WISE	EUN	1.8 km	MPC · JPL
419545	2010 OS_{50}	—	December 18, 2003	Socorro	LINEAR	·	2.0 km	MPC · JPL
419546	2010 OG_{64}	—	February 2, 2009	Kitt Peak	Spacewatch	·	4.6 km	MPC · JPL
419547	2010 OV_{74}	—	January 18, 2009	Catalina	CSS	·	4.3 km	MPC · JPL
419548	2010 OR_{81}	—	October 4, 2006	Mount Lemmon	Mount Lemmon Survey	·	2.1 km	MPC · JPL
419549	2010 OZ_{83}	—	July 26, 2010	WISE	WISE	·	4.1 km	MPC · JPL
419550	2010 OM_{90}	—	July 27, 2010	WISE	WISE	·	1.9 km	MPC · JPL
419551	2010 OM_{106}	—	July 29, 2010	WISE	WISE	ADE	2.0 km	MPC · JPL
419552	2010 OF_{118}	—	July 30, 2010	WISE	WISE	·	1.8 km	MPC · JPL
419553	2010 PA_{25}	—	August 7, 2010	Purple Mountain	PMO NEO Survey Program	·	1.2 km	MPC · JPL
419554	2010 PA_{52}	—	August 8, 2010	WISE	WISE	(194)	2.3 km	MPC · JPL
419555	2010 PJ_{62}	—	February 27, 2006	Kitt Peak	Spacewatch	·	940 m	MPC · JPL
419556	2010 PO_{73}	—	August 7, 2010	La Sagra	OAM	MAS	610 m	MPC · JPL
419557	2010 PC_{77}	—	August 12, 2010	Kitt Peak	Spacewatch	MAS	670 m	MPC · JPL
419558	2010 PO_{77}	—	June 21, 2010	Mount Lemmon	Mount Lemmon Survey	·	1.4 km	MPC · JPL
419559	2010 QA_{1}	—	August 16, 2010	La Sagra	OAM	NYS	1.1 km	MPC · JPL
419560	2010 QX_{3}	—	February 9, 2005	Kitt Peak	Spacewatch	·	830 m	MPC · JPL
419561	2010 RL_{4}	—	November 23, 2003	Kitt Peak	Spacewatch	NYS	1.1 km	MPC · JPL
419562	2010 RF_{5}	—	September 1, 2010	ESA OGS	ESA OGS	·	1.3 km	MPC · JPL
419563	2010 RS_{7}	—	September 2, 2010	Mount Lemmon	Mount Lemmon Survey	·	1.3 km	MPC · JPL
419564	2010 RM_{9}	—	September 2, 2010	Socorro	LINEAR	·	1.1 km	MPC · JPL
419565	2010 RT_{10}	—	September 2, 2010	Mount Lemmon	Mount Lemmon Survey	·	840 m	MPC · JPL
419566	2010 RN_{12}	—	September 1, 2010	Socorro	LINEAR	·	950 m	MPC · JPL
419567	2010 RX_{18}	—	February 7, 2008	Mount Lemmon	Mount Lemmon Survey	·	900 m	MPC · JPL
419568	2010 RS_{47}	—	September 4, 2010	Kitt Peak	Spacewatch	·	1.2 km	MPC · JPL
419569	2010 RQ_{48}	—	January 11, 2008	Kitt Peak	Spacewatch	·	910 m	MPC · JPL
419570	2010 RY_{48}	—	October 4, 1999	Kitt Peak	Spacewatch	·	960 m	MPC · JPL
419571	2010 RL_{50}	—	September 4, 2010	Kitt Peak	Spacewatch	MAS	660 m	MPC · JPL
419572	2010 RQ_{50}	—	September 4, 2010	Kitt Peak	Spacewatch	NYS	960 m	MPC · JPL
419573	2010 RE_{52}	—	September 4, 2010	Kitt Peak	Spacewatch	·	1.1 km	MPC · JPL
419574	2010 RE_{53}	—	September 6, 2010	Socorro	LINEAR	·	870 m	MPC · JPL
419575	2010 RH_{53}	—	November 19, 2007	Mount Lemmon	Mount Lemmon Survey	·	1.3 km	MPC · JPL
419576	2010 RY_{58}	—	March 8, 2009	Mount Lemmon	Mount Lemmon Survey	V	620 m	MPC · JPL
419577	2010 RB_{65}	—	October 13, 1999	Apache Point	SDSS	·	1.2 km	MPC · JPL
419578	2010 RV_{67}	—	September 5, 2010	Mount Lemmon	Mount Lemmon Survey	(5)	990 m	MPC · JPL
419579	2010 RL_{71}	—	September 14, 1999	Kitt Peak	Spacewatch	NYS	1.0 km	MPC · JPL
419580	2010 RA_{79}	—	January 30, 2008	Mount Lemmon	Mount Lemmon Survey	·	1.1 km	MPC · JPL
419581	2010 RD_{80}	—	November 29, 1999	Kitt Peak	Spacewatch	·	1.1 km	MPC · JPL
419582	2010 RQ_{81}	—	April 12, 2005	Kitt Peak	Deep Ecliptic Survey	V	650 m	MPC · JPL
419583	2010 RY_{81}	—	November 18, 2003	Palomar	NEAT	·	1.1 km	MPC · JPL
419584	2010 RC_{94}	—	September 19, 2003	Kitt Peak	Spacewatch	·	750 m	MPC · JPL
419585	2010 RN_{96}	—	September 2, 2010	Mount Lemmon	Mount Lemmon Survey	·	1.3 km	MPC · JPL
419586	2010 RE_{98}	—	February 11, 2008	Mount Lemmon	Mount Lemmon Survey	·	1.0 km	MPC · JPL
419587	2010 RK_{98}	—	April 28, 2009	Mount Lemmon	Mount Lemmon Survey	·	840 m	MPC · JPL
419588	2010 RA_{102}	—	September 10, 2010	Kitt Peak	Spacewatch	NYS	1.0 km	MPC · JPL
419589	2010 RS_{103}	—	September 10, 2010	Kitt Peak	Spacewatch	·	1.2 km	MPC · JPL
419590	2010 RD_{105}	—	February 12, 2008	Kitt Peak	Spacewatch	NYS	1.0 km	MPC · JPL
419591	2010 RC_{107}	—	August 24, 2006	Palomar	NEAT	·	1.2 km	MPC · JPL
419592	2010 RX_{110}	—	September 11, 2010	Kitt Peak	Spacewatch	·	970 m	MPC · JPL
419593	2010 RV_{111}	—	September 11, 2010	Kitt Peak	Spacewatch	NYS	1.0 km	MPC · JPL
419594	2010 RS_{112}	—	September 11, 2010	Kitt Peak	Spacewatch	·	1.3 km	MPC · JPL
419595	2010 RW_{112}	—	November 20, 2003	Socorro	LINEAR	·	1 km	MPC · JPL
419596	2010 RB_{113}	—	October 19, 2003	Apache Point	SDSS	·	680 m	MPC · JPL
419597	2010 RH_{113}	—	September 11, 2010	Kitt Peak	Spacewatch	V	610 m	MPC · JPL
419598	2010 RO_{115}	—	September 11, 2010	Catalina	CSS	·	1.3 km	MPC · JPL
419599	2010 RT_{117}	—	September 11, 2010	Kitt Peak	Spacewatch	NYS	1.2 km	MPC · JPL
419600	2010 RT_{118}	—	September 11, 2010	Kitt Peak	Spacewatch	·	1.4 km	MPC · JPL

== 419601–419700 ==
back to top

Designation			Discovery			Properties		Ref
Permanent	Provisional	Named after	Date	Site	Discoverer(s)	Category	Diam.	Ref
419601	2010 RE_{119}	—	December 19, 2007	Mount Lemmon	Mount Lemmon Survey	·	1.4 km	MPC · JPL
419602	2010 RT_{120}	—	September 11, 2010	Catalina	CSS	·	850 m	MPC · JPL
419603	2010 RO_{121}	—	October 24, 2003	Kitt Peak	Spacewatch	V	610 m	MPC · JPL
419604	2010 RF_{125}	—	February 19, 2009	Kitt Peak	Spacewatch	·	1.1 km	MPC · JPL
419605	2010 RJ_{125}	—	November 29, 1999	Kitt Peak	Spacewatch	MAS	620 m	MPC · JPL
419606	2010 RQ_{128}	—	September 14, 2010	Kitt Peak	Spacewatch	V	570 m	MPC · JPL
419607	2010 RJ_{136}	—	August 18, 2006	Kitt Peak	Spacewatch	·	900 m	MPC · JPL
419608	2010 RM_{140}	—	March 9, 2005	Kitt Peak	Spacewatch	PHO	1.6 km	MPC · JPL
419609	2010 RX_{140}	—	February 8, 2008	Kitt Peak	Spacewatch	·	1.1 km	MPC · JPL
419610	2010 RL_{141}	—	March 2, 2009	Kitt Peak	Spacewatch	·	950 m	MPC · JPL
419611	2010 RH_{142}	—	September 14, 2010	Kitt Peak	Spacewatch	·	1.1 km	MPC · JPL
419612	2010 RJ_{146}	—	October 20, 2003	Kitt Peak	Spacewatch	·	740 m	MPC · JPL
419613	2010 RY_{149}	—	September 15, 2010	Kitt Peak	Spacewatch	·	990 m	MPC · JPL
419614	2010 RA_{152}	—	September 4, 2010	Kitt Peak	Spacewatch	·	1.0 km	MPC · JPL
419615	2010 RS_{164}	—	November 7, 2007	Kitt Peak	Spacewatch	·	790 m	MPC · JPL
419616	2010 RT_{166}	—	October 12, 2006	Kitt Peak	Spacewatch	·	1.2 km	MPC · JPL
419617	2010 RS_{173}	—	June 3, 2006	Mount Lemmon	Mount Lemmon Survey	·	870 m	MPC · JPL
419618	2010 RE_{175}	—	September 9, 2010	Kitt Peak	Spacewatch	·	1.4 km	MPC · JPL
419619	2010 RC_{182}	—	January 13, 2008	Mount Lemmon	Mount Lemmon Survey	·	1.2 km	MPC · JPL
419620	2010 RK_{182}	—	November 7, 2007	Kitt Peak	Spacewatch	V	670 m	MPC · JPL
419621	2010 SN	—	December 18, 2007	Mount Lemmon	Mount Lemmon Survey	V	590 m	MPC · JPL
419622	2010 SQ_{11}	—	September 30, 2003	Kitt Peak	Spacewatch	·	900 m	MPC · JPL
419623	2010 SR_{14}	—	February 12, 2008	Kitt Peak	Spacewatch	·	960 m	MPC · JPL
419624	2010 SO_{16}	—	September 17, 2010	WISE	WISE	APO · PHA	360 m	MPC · JPL
419625	2010 SQ_{18}	—	March 11, 2005	Kitt Peak	Spacewatch	·	840 m	MPC · JPL
419626	2010 SY_{18}	—	October 10, 1999	Socorro	LINEAR	·	960 m	MPC · JPL
419627	2010 SM_{22}	—	November 23, 2003	Kitt Peak	Spacewatch	·	890 m	MPC · JPL
419628	2010 SL_{23}	—	September 19, 2010	Kitt Peak	Spacewatch	·	900 m	MPC · JPL
419629	2010 SS_{29}	—	February 2, 2008	Mount Lemmon	Mount Lemmon Survey	MAS	810 m	MPC · JPL
419630	2010 SK_{34}	—	February 9, 2008	Kitt Peak	Spacewatch	·	1.2 km	MPC · JPL
419631	2010 SD_{42}	—	August 21, 2006	Kitt Peak	Spacewatch	MAS	740 m	MPC · JPL
419632	2010 TO_{3}	—	November 20, 2003	Kitt Peak	Spacewatch	V	700 m	MPC · JPL
419633	2010 TU_{3}	—	April 18, 2009	Mount Lemmon	Mount Lemmon Survey	·	1.2 km	MPC · JPL
419634	2010 TK_{5}	—	November 14, 1995	Kitt Peak	Spacewatch	NYS	1.0 km	MPC · JPL
419635	2010 TG_{9}	—	September 28, 2003	Kitt Peak	Spacewatch	·	910 m	MPC · JPL
419636	2010 TF_{13}	—	September 15, 2006	Kitt Peak	Spacewatch	·	1.1 km	MPC · JPL
419637	2010 TY_{13}	—	January 18, 2008	Kitt Peak	Spacewatch	·	920 m	MPC · JPL
419638	2010 TO_{17}	—	January 11, 2008	Kitt Peak	Spacewatch	·	1.1 km	MPC · JPL
419639	2010 TU_{19}	—	December 5, 2007	Mount Lemmon	Mount Lemmon Survey	·	930 m	MPC · JPL
419640	2010 TL_{22}	—	January 1, 2008	Kitt Peak	Spacewatch	NYS	820 m	MPC · JPL
419641	2010 TP_{22}	—	September 19, 2003	Kitt Peak	Spacewatch	V	660 m	MPC · JPL
419642	2010 TY_{25}	—	November 28, 1999	Kitt Peak	Spacewatch	·	1.2 km	MPC · JPL
419643	2010 TA_{26}	—	September 18, 2003	Kitt Peak	Spacewatch	V	550 m	MPC · JPL
419644	2010 TU_{28}	—	October 22, 1995	Kitt Peak	Spacewatch	NYS	970 m	MPC · JPL
419645	2010 TP_{29}	—	October 15, 1999	Kitt Peak	Spacewatch	·	980 m	MPC · JPL
419646	2010 TT_{35}	—	April 28, 2009	Mount Lemmon	Mount Lemmon Survey	·	1.2 km	MPC · JPL
419647	2010 TV_{35}	—	December 13, 2006	Catalina	CSS	·	1.6 km	MPC · JPL
419648	2010 TW_{37}	—	August 17, 2006	Palomar	NEAT	·	1.0 km	MPC · JPL
419649	2010 TX_{41}	—	December 31, 2007	Kitt Peak	Spacewatch	·	1.0 km	MPC · JPL
419650	2010 TG_{49}	—	March 22, 2009	Mount Lemmon	Mount Lemmon Survey	·	1.2 km	MPC · JPL
419651	2010 TJ_{58}	—	August 19, 2010	XuYi	PMO NEO Survey Program	MAS	660 m	MPC · JPL
419652	2010 TG_{62}	—	August 29, 2006	Kitt Peak	Spacewatch	·	1.3 km	MPC · JPL
419653	2010 TT_{62}	—	September 19, 2010	Kitt Peak	Spacewatch	·	1.1 km	MPC · JPL
419654	2010 TW_{69}	—	September 30, 2003	Kitt Peak	Spacewatch	·	760 m	MPC · JPL
419655	2010 TC_{73}	—	February 28, 2008	Mount Lemmon	Mount Lemmon Survey	·	990 m	MPC · JPL
419656	2010 TC_{79}	—	October 2, 2006	Mount Lemmon	Mount Lemmon Survey	MAS	800 m	MPC · JPL
419657	2010 TZ_{84}	—	March 21, 2009	Kitt Peak	Spacewatch	·	2.0 km	MPC · JPL
419658	2010 TG_{88}	—	August 30, 2003	Kitt Peak	Spacewatch	·	650 m	MPC · JPL
419659	2010 TH_{92}	—	November 10, 1999	Kitt Peak	Spacewatch	·	1.1 km	MPC · JPL
419660	2010 TN_{101}	—	October 2, 2006	Kitt Peak	Spacewatch	·	1.0 km	MPC · JPL
419661	2010 TM_{102}	—	August 23, 2003	Palomar	NEAT	·	1.1 km	MPC · JPL
419662	2010 TV_{102}	—	March 24, 2009	Mount Lemmon	Mount Lemmon Survey	·	960 m	MPC · JPL
419663	2010 TG_{104}	—	September 12, 2010	Kitt Peak	Spacewatch	V	650 m	MPC · JPL
419664	2010 TE_{110}	—	April 11, 2005	Mount Lemmon	Mount Lemmon Survey	·	1.2 km	MPC · JPL
419665	2010 TS_{113}	—	October 22, 2006	Kitt Peak	Spacewatch	·	940 m	MPC · JPL
419666	2010 TZ_{137}	—	December 25, 2006	Catalina	CSS	·	1.7 km	MPC · JPL
419667	2010 TT_{141}	—	May 18, 2009	Mount Lemmon	Mount Lemmon Survey	·	1.3 km	MPC · JPL
419668	2010 TN_{142}	—	November 18, 2006	Mount Lemmon	Mount Lemmon Survey	·	1.1 km	MPC · JPL
419669	2010 TC_{144}	—	September 30, 2006	Mount Lemmon	Mount Lemmon Survey	·	1.6 km	MPC · JPL
419670	2010 TD_{148}	—	April 16, 2004	Kitt Peak	Spacewatch	·	1.8 km	MPC · JPL
419671	2010 TP_{153}	—	March 10, 2007	Palomar	NEAT	·	2.1 km	MPC · JPL
419672	2010 TB_{168}	—	August 28, 2006	Catalina	CSS	MAS	630 m	MPC · JPL
419673	2010 TC_{170}	—	February 12, 2008	Kitt Peak	Spacewatch	MAS	790 m	MPC · JPL
419674	2010 TD_{172}	—	August 28, 2006	Kitt Peak	Spacewatch	·	870 m	MPC · JPL
419675	2010 TW_{172}	—	March 5, 2008	Mount Lemmon	Mount Lemmon Survey	·	1.0 km	MPC · JPL
419676	2010 TQ_{173}	—	March 6, 2008	Mount Lemmon	Mount Lemmon Survey	·	1.0 km	MPC · JPL
419677	2010 TJ_{179}	—	December 17, 2007	Mount Lemmon	Mount Lemmon Survey	·	1.2 km	MPC · JPL
419678	2010 TJ_{180}	—	October 2, 2010	Mount Lemmon	Mount Lemmon Survey	V	680 m	MPC · JPL
419679	2010 TV_{183}	—	January 20, 2008	Mount Lemmon	Mount Lemmon Survey	MAR	1.2 km	MPC · JPL
419680	2010 TP_{185}	—	March 10, 2005	Mount Lemmon	Mount Lemmon Survey	·	710 m	MPC · JPL
419681	2010 TR_{185}	—	August 27, 2006	Kitt Peak	Spacewatch	V	580 m	MPC · JPL
419682	2010 TF_{187}	—	May 31, 2006	Mount Lemmon	Mount Lemmon Survey	·	1.3 km	MPC · JPL
419683	2010 UV	—	August 27, 2006	Kitt Peak	Spacewatch	NYS	1.0 km	MPC · JPL
419684	2010 UZ	—	February 28, 2008	Kitt Peak	Spacewatch	·	870 m	MPC · JPL
419685	2010 UT_{3}	—	October 17, 2010	Mount Lemmon	Mount Lemmon Survey	·	1.8 km	MPC · JPL
419686	2010 UY_{11}	—	August 22, 2006	Palomar	NEAT	·	1.1 km	MPC · JPL
419687	2010 UC_{12}	—	September 18, 2010	Mount Lemmon	Mount Lemmon Survey	·	1.5 km	MPC · JPL
419688	2010 UV_{12}	—	November 16, 2003	Kitt Peak	Spacewatch	·	900 m	MPC · JPL
419689	2010 UJ_{15}	—	November 18, 1995	Kitt Peak	Spacewatch	·	1.2 km	MPC · JPL
419690	2010 UW_{21}	—	November 24, 2003	Kitt Peak	Spacewatch	·	1.2 km	MPC · JPL
419691	2010 UP_{31}	—	December 30, 2007	Kitt Peak	Spacewatch	·	1.2 km	MPC · JPL
419692	2010 UP_{37}	—	October 29, 2010	Mount Lemmon	Mount Lemmon Survey	·	1.9 km	MPC · JPL
419693	2010 UY_{40}	—	August 30, 2006	Anderson Mesa	LONEOS	MAS	810 m	MPC · JPL
419694	2010 UC_{41}	—	June 29, 2005	Kitt Peak	Spacewatch	·	1.6 km	MPC · JPL
419695	2010 UO_{41}	—	October 1, 2006	Kitt Peak	Spacewatch	·	1.4 km	MPC · JPL
419696	2010 UV_{41}	—	April 20, 2009	Mount Lemmon	Mount Lemmon Survey	·	1.5 km	MPC · JPL
419697	2010 UU_{44}	—	March 9, 2008	Socorro	LINEAR	·	1.4 km	MPC · JPL
419698	2010 UO_{50}	—	March 12, 2008	Catalina	CSS	·	2.1 km	MPC · JPL
419699	2010 UF_{55}	—	April 5, 2008	Kitt Peak	Spacewatch	EUN	1.1 km	MPC · JPL
419700	2010 UY_{58}	—	May 15, 2005	Mount Lemmon	Mount Lemmon Survey	·	1.6 km	MPC · JPL

== 419701–419800 ==
back to top

Designation			Discovery			Properties		Ref
Permanent	Provisional	Named after	Date	Site	Discoverer(s)	Category	Diam.	Ref
419701	2010 UE_{59}	—	May 6, 2000	Kitt Peak	Spacewatch	·	1.6 km	MPC · JPL
419702	2010 UV_{59}	—	February 21, 2007	Catalina	CSS	·	2.1 km	MPC · JPL
419703	2010 UG_{63}	—	September 11, 2010	Mount Lemmon	Mount Lemmon Survey	·	1.4 km	MPC · JPL
419704	2010 UH_{69}	—	November 19, 2006	Lulin	LUSS	·	1.3 km	MPC · JPL
419705	2010 UX_{70}	—	October 15, 2001	Socorro	LINEAR	·	2.3 km	MPC · JPL
419706	2010 UU_{74}	—	October 22, 2006	Catalina	CSS	·	1.6 km	MPC · JPL
419707	2010 UV_{75}	—	October 13, 2010	Mount Lemmon	Mount Lemmon Survey	·	1.2 km	MPC · JPL
419708	2010 UM_{76}	—	October 10, 1999	Socorro	LINEAR	·	1.6 km	MPC · JPL
419709	2010 UN_{76}	—	August 29, 2006	Kitt Peak	Spacewatch	·	1.1 km	MPC · JPL
419710	2010 UN_{79}	—	October 30, 2010	Mount Lemmon	Mount Lemmon Survey	·	1.1 km	MPC · JPL
419711	2010 UW_{80}	—	October 11, 2010	Mount Lemmon	Mount Lemmon Survey	·	1.8 km	MPC · JPL
419712	2010 UO_{88}	—	October 30, 2010	Mount Lemmon	Mount Lemmon Survey	·	1.5 km	MPC · JPL
419713	2010 UO_{93}	—	March 9, 2008	Siding Spring	SSS	PHO	2.4 km	MPC · JPL
419714	2010 UK_{98}	—	September 28, 2006	Mount Lemmon	Mount Lemmon Survey	(5)	1.2 km	MPC · JPL
419715	2010 UW_{100}	—	August 28, 2006	Anderson Mesa	LONEOS	·	1.3 km	MPC · JPL
419716	2010 UL_{105}	—	October 30, 2002	Apache Point	SDSS	·	1.0 km	MPC · JPL
419717	2010 VC_{14}	—	November 1, 2010	Mount Lemmon	Mount Lemmon Survey	·	1.2 km	MPC · JPL
419718	2010 VR_{17}	—	December 5, 2000	Socorro	LINEAR	·	1.3 km	MPC · JPL
419719	2010 VB_{18}	—	October 12, 2010	Mount Lemmon	Mount Lemmon Survey	·	1.3 km	MPC · JPL
419720	2010 VY_{19}	—	April 21, 2003	Kitt Peak	Spacewatch	(5)	1.7 km	MPC · JPL
419721	2010 VT_{23}	—	September 28, 2006	Kitt Peak	Spacewatch	·	1.2 km	MPC · JPL
419722	2010 VP_{24}	—	November 14, 1998	Kitt Peak	Spacewatch	·	880 m	MPC · JPL
419723	2010 VE_{25}	—	December 16, 2006	Mount Lemmon	Mount Lemmon Survey	·	1.3 km	MPC · JPL
419724	2010 VU_{25}	—	October 21, 2006	Mount Lemmon	Mount Lemmon Survey	·	1 km	MPC · JPL
419725	2010 VX_{25}	—	September 25, 2006	Mount Lemmon	Mount Lemmon Survey	NYS	910 m	MPC · JPL
419726	2010 VM_{26}	—	October 2, 2006	Kitt Peak	Spacewatch	·	820 m	MPC · JPL
419727	2010 VU_{28}	—	December 17, 2003	Kitt Peak	Spacewatch	NYS	1.2 km	MPC · JPL
419728	2010 VR_{29}	—	October 13, 2010	Mount Lemmon	Mount Lemmon Survey	·	2.3 km	MPC · JPL
419729	2010 VX_{31}	—	October 27, 1995	Kitt Peak	Spacewatch	NYS	1.3 km	MPC · JPL
419730	2010 VF_{36}	—	October 23, 2006	Palomar	NEAT	PHO	1.4 km	MPC · JPL
419731	2010 VS_{46}	—	October 20, 2006	Mount Lemmon	Mount Lemmon Survey	·	1.2 km	MPC · JPL
419732	2010 VW_{46}	—	February 13, 2004	Kitt Peak	Spacewatch	·	1.6 km	MPC · JPL
419733	2010 VY_{46}	—	October 4, 2006	Mount Lemmon	Mount Lemmon Survey	·	1.3 km	MPC · JPL
419734	2010 VS_{51}	—	August 1, 2001	Palomar	NEAT	MAR	1.3 km	MPC · JPL
419735	2010 VY_{51}	—	December 12, 2006	Kitt Peak	Spacewatch	·	1.2 km	MPC · JPL
419736	2010 VB_{52}	—	December 5, 2007	Kitt Peak	Spacewatch	·	800 m	MPC · JPL
419737	2010 VZ_{60}	—	November 26, 2003	Kitt Peak	Spacewatch	·	860 m	MPC · JPL
419738	2010 VW_{66}	—	August 30, 2006	Anderson Mesa	LONEOS	·	1.5 km	MPC · JPL
419739	2010 VY_{70}	—	February 9, 2008	Mount Lemmon	Mount Lemmon Survey	·	1.2 km	MPC · JPL
419740	2010 VN_{72}	—	September 16, 2006	Catalina	CSS	PHO	740 m	MPC · JPL
419741	2010 VT_{73}	—	March 6, 2008	Mount Lemmon	Mount Lemmon Survey	·	1.4 km	MPC · JPL
419742	2010 VG_{74}	—	November 3, 2010	Mount Lemmon	Mount Lemmon Survey	(5)	1.0 km	MPC · JPL
419743	2010 VN_{74}	—	May 4, 2005	Mount Lemmon	Mount Lemmon Survey	·	1.4 km	MPC · JPL
419744	2010 VP_{77}	—	December 15, 1999	Kitt Peak	Spacewatch	·	1.1 km	MPC · JPL
419745	2010 VH_{80}	—	April 22, 2004	Kitt Peak	Spacewatch	·	1.6 km	MPC · JPL
419746	2010 VT_{81}	—	November 3, 2010	Kitt Peak	Spacewatch	·	1.2 km	MPC · JPL
419747	2010 VW_{83}	—	May 9, 2004	Kitt Peak	Spacewatch	·	990 m	MPC · JPL
419748	2010 VD_{85}	—	November 24, 2006	Kitt Peak	Spacewatch	·	1.2 km	MPC · JPL
419749	2010 VA_{86}	—	December 21, 2006	Kitt Peak	Spacewatch	·	1.4 km	MPC · JPL
419750	2010 VB_{87}	—	September 28, 2006	Mount Lemmon	Mount Lemmon Survey	·	630 m	MPC · JPL
419751	2010 VB_{89}	—	November 6, 2010	Kitt Peak	Spacewatch	·	1.1 km	MPC · JPL
419752	2010 VN_{90}	—	November 20, 2006	Kitt Peak	Spacewatch	·	950 m	MPC · JPL
419753	2010 VP_{90}	—	October 29, 2010	Mount Lemmon	Mount Lemmon Survey	·	1.7 km	MPC · JPL
419754	2010 VF_{95}	—	November 7, 2010	Mount Lemmon	Mount Lemmon Survey	·	2.4 km	MPC · JPL
419755	2010 VU_{96}	—	August 29, 2006	Kitt Peak	Spacewatch	NYS	1.0 km	MPC · JPL
419756	2010 VX_{98}	—	March 17, 2007	Catalina	CSS	·	2.6 km	MPC · JPL
419757	2010 VW_{103}	—	October 22, 2006	Mount Lemmon	Mount Lemmon Survey	·	1.1 km	MPC · JPL
419758	2010 VY_{105}	—	November 16, 2006	Kitt Peak	Spacewatch	·	800 m	MPC · JPL
419759	2010 VS_{110}	—	September 25, 2006	Catalina	CSS	·	1.2 km	MPC · JPL
419760	2010 VA_{112}	—	September 18, 2010	Mount Lemmon	Mount Lemmon Survey	·	1.2 km	MPC · JPL
419761	2010 VK_{114}	—	September 5, 2010	Mount Lemmon	Mount Lemmon Survey	(5)	1.1 km	MPC · JPL
419762	2010 VO_{114}	—	August 28, 2006	Kitt Peak	Spacewatch	·	1.0 km	MPC · JPL
419763	2010 VQ_{114}	—	October 30, 2010	Kitt Peak	Spacewatch	·	1.2 km	MPC · JPL
419764	2010 VP_{120}	—	November 8, 2010	Kitt Peak	Spacewatch	·	1.4 km	MPC · JPL
419765	2010 VX_{122}	—	February 9, 2008	Catalina	CSS	·	1.3 km	MPC · JPL
419766	2010 VA_{131}	—	October 11, 2010	Catalina	CSS	·	870 m	MPC · JPL
419767	2010 VC_{132}	—	October 22, 2003	Kitt Peak	Spacewatch	·	930 m	MPC · JPL
419768	2010 VF_{133}	—	April 7, 2008	Mount Lemmon	Mount Lemmon Survey	·	920 m	MPC · JPL
419769	2010 VO_{133}	—	October 28, 2010	Mount Lemmon	Mount Lemmon Survey	·	1.4 km	MPC · JPL
419770	2010 VC_{134}	—	November 10, 1996	Kitt Peak	Spacewatch	NYS	840 m	MPC · JPL
419771	2010 VF_{137}	—	September 30, 2006	Mount Lemmon	Mount Lemmon Survey	·	1.1 km	MPC · JPL
419772	2010 VO_{146}	—	November 16, 2006	Kitt Peak	Spacewatch	·	1.4 km	MPC · JPL
419773	2010 VR_{147}	—	November 6, 2010	Mount Lemmon	Mount Lemmon Survey	·	1.2 km	MPC · JPL
419774	2010 VT_{147}	—	September 27, 2006	Mount Lemmon	Mount Lemmon Survey	·	1.2 km	MPC · JPL
419775	2010 VW_{151}	—	November 6, 2010	Mount Lemmon	Mount Lemmon Survey	·	1.6 km	MPC · JPL
419776	2010 VF_{161}	—	September 11, 2010	Mount Lemmon	Mount Lemmon Survey	·	1.1 km	MPC · JPL
419777	2010 VG_{165}	—	November 11, 2006	Kitt Peak	Spacewatch	·	990 m	MPC · JPL
419778	2010 VZ_{170}	—	October 28, 2010	Kitt Peak	Spacewatch	(5)	1.2 km	MPC · JPL
419779	2010 VL_{172}	—	February 10, 2008	Kitt Peak	Spacewatch	·	1.1 km	MPC · JPL
419780	2010 VQ_{173}	—	November 10, 2010	Mount Lemmon	Mount Lemmon Survey	RAF	810 m	MPC · JPL
419781	2010 VP_{178}	—	March 15, 2008	Mount Lemmon	Mount Lemmon Survey	·	850 m	MPC · JPL
419782	2010 VF_{182}	—	November 6, 2010	Kitt Peak	Spacewatch	(5)	1.2 km	MPC · JPL
419783	2010 VM_{185}	—	September 17, 2006	Kitt Peak	Spacewatch	V	550 m	MPC · JPL
419784	2010 VN_{196}	—	November 5, 2010	Kitt Peak	Spacewatch	·	1.0 km	MPC · JPL
419785	2010 VQ_{198}	—	November 13, 2010	Mount Lemmon	Mount Lemmon Survey	·	2.1 km	MPC · JPL
419786	2010 VY_{199}	—	December 11, 2006	Kitt Peak	Spacewatch	·	1.2 km	MPC · JPL
419787	2010 VP_{203}	—	September 14, 2006	Catalina	CSS	NYS	1.3 km	MPC · JPL
419788	2010 VZ_{204}	—	August 19, 2006	Kitt Peak	Spacewatch	·	850 m	MPC · JPL
419789	2010 VB_{206}	—	January 5, 2000	Kitt Peak	Spacewatch	MAS	610 m	MPC · JPL
419790	2010 VX_{208}	—	August 19, 2002	Palomar	NEAT	·	1.4 km	MPC · JPL
419791	2010 VQ_{210}	—	March 4, 2005	Catalina	CSS	·	940 m	MPC · JPL
419792	2010 VV_{216}	—	November 19, 2001	Socorro	LINEAR	·	2.0 km	MPC · JPL
419793	2010 VD_{217}	—	August 28, 2006	Kitt Peak	Spacewatch	V	690 m	MPC · JPL
419794	2010 VT_{218}	—	September 12, 2002	Palomar	NEAT	·	1.2 km	MPC · JPL
419795	2010 VR_{219}	—	March 16, 2005	Catalina	CSS	V	720 m	MPC · JPL
419796	2010 WU_{3}	—	March 29, 2008	Kitt Peak	Spacewatch	·	1.4 km	MPC · JPL
419797	2010 WP_{13}	—	September 18, 2010	Mount Lemmon	Mount Lemmon Survey	·	1.1 km	MPC · JPL
419798	2010 WK_{15}	—	April 2, 2005	Catalina	CSS	·	1.5 km	MPC · JPL
419799	2010 WP_{29}	—	November 14, 2010	Catalina	CSS	·	1.0 km	MPC · JPL
419800	2010 WH_{30}	—	April 28, 2000	Kitt Peak	Spacewatch	·	1.9 km	MPC · JPL

== 419801–419900 ==
back to top

Designation			Discovery			Properties		Ref
Permanent	Provisional	Named after	Date	Site	Discoverer(s)	Category	Diam.	Ref
419801	2010 WM_{48}	—	October 20, 1995	Kitt Peak	Spacewatch	NYS	1.1 km	MPC · JPL
419802	2010 WT_{48}	—	July 29, 2005	Palomar	NEAT	·	1.3 km	MPC · JPL
419803	2010 WH_{50}	—	February 12, 2008	Siding Spring	SSS	PHO	1.5 km	MPC · JPL
419804	2010 WC_{54}	—	July 28, 2009	Kitt Peak	Spacewatch	·	1.6 km	MPC · JPL
419805	2010 WW_{54}	—	April 1, 2008	Kitt Peak	Spacewatch	·	1.9 km	MPC · JPL
419806	2010 WN_{55}	—	September 28, 2006	Mount Lemmon	Mount Lemmon Survey	·	1.2 km	MPC · JPL
419807	2010 WU_{56}	—	March 1, 2008	Mount Lemmon	Mount Lemmon Survey	·	1.4 km	MPC · JPL
419808	2010 WD_{59}	—	October 23, 2006	Mount Lemmon	Mount Lemmon Survey	·	1.1 km	MPC · JPL
419809	2010 WD_{62}	—	November 16, 2006	Kitt Peak	Spacewatch	·	1.0 km	MPC · JPL
419810	2010 WE_{64}	—	November 18, 2006	Mount Lemmon	Mount Lemmon Survey	(5)	1.4 km	MPC · JPL
419811	2010 WD_{67}	—	January 7, 1999	Kitt Peak	Spacewatch	(5)	1.0 km	MPC · JPL
419812	2010 WL_{69}	—	November 30, 2010	Mount Lemmon	Mount Lemmon Survey	·	1.2 km	MPC · JPL
419813	2010 WS_{70}	—	November 28, 2010	Mount Lemmon	Mount Lemmon Survey	·	2.4 km	MPC · JPL
419814	2010 WT_{74}	—	November 10, 2010	Catalina	CSS	·	1.5 km	MPC · JPL
419815	2010 XB_{5}	—	November 12, 2010	Kitt Peak	Spacewatch	·	1.0 km	MPC · JPL
419816	2010 XO_{8}	—	November 6, 2010	Mount Lemmon	Mount Lemmon Survey	·	1.8 km	MPC · JPL
419817	2010 XZ_{9}	—	July 3, 2005	Palomar	NEAT	·	1.4 km	MPC · JPL
419818	2010 XH_{12}	—	December 9, 2006	Kitt Peak	Spacewatch	·	1.7 km	MPC · JPL
419819	2010 XJ_{13}	—	November 1, 2010	Kitt Peak	Spacewatch	AGN	1.3 km	MPC · JPL
419820	2010 XN_{14}	—	August 24, 2001	Anderson Mesa	LONEOS	·	2.1 km	MPC · JPL
419821	2010 XG_{19}	—	November 6, 2010	Mount Lemmon	Mount Lemmon Survey	KON	2.0 km	MPC · JPL
419822	2010 XE_{23}	—	March 31, 2008	Mount Lemmon	Mount Lemmon Survey	·	1.1 km	MPC · JPL
419823	2010 XZ_{37}	—	January 16, 2007	Anderson Mesa	LONEOS	·	1.3 km	MPC · JPL
419824	2010 XC_{42}	—	October 31, 2010	Mount Lemmon	Mount Lemmon Survey	·	1.7 km	MPC · JPL
419825	2010 XH_{42}	—	November 10, 2010	Mount Lemmon	Mount Lemmon Survey	PAD	1.6 km	MPC · JPL
419826	2010 XL_{42}	—	October 31, 1999	Kitt Peak	Spacewatch	NYS	1.1 km	MPC · JPL
419827	2010 XE_{43}	—	October 22, 2006	Kitt Peak	Spacewatch	·	1.8 km	MPC · JPL
419828	2010 XX_{45}	—	November 28, 2006	Mount Lemmon	Mount Lemmon Survey	·	2.0 km	MPC · JPL
419829	2010 XK_{52}	—	December 10, 2010	Catalina	CSS	AMO +1km	900 m	MPC · JPL
419830	2010 XM_{54}	—	October 7, 2005	Mount Lemmon	Mount Lemmon Survey	·	2.5 km	MPC · JPL
419831	2010 XH_{57}	—	March 14, 2007	Anderson Mesa	LONEOS	·	1.3 km	MPC · JPL
419832	2010 XE_{59}	—	December 18, 2001	Socorro	LINEAR	GEF	1.4 km	MPC · JPL
419833	2010 XZ_{60}	—	April 15, 2008	Mount Lemmon	Mount Lemmon Survey	·	1.5 km	MPC · JPL
419834	2010 XW_{66}	—	April 6, 2008	Kitt Peak	Spacewatch	·	1.3 km	MPC · JPL
419835	2010 XU_{68}	—	October 28, 2006	Mount Lemmon	Mount Lemmon Survey	·	2.2 km	MPC · JPL
419836	2010 XJ_{71}	—	January 10, 2007	Kitt Peak	Spacewatch	(5)	1.1 km	MPC · JPL
419837	2010 XW_{79}	—	November 23, 2006	Mount Lemmon	Mount Lemmon Survey	(5)	1.3 km	MPC · JPL
419838	2010 XR_{82}	—	February 6, 2007	Mount Lemmon	Mount Lemmon Survey	·	1.4 km	MPC · JPL
419839	2010 XK_{84}	—	September 21, 2001	Anderson Mesa	LONEOS	·	1.9 km	MPC · JPL
419840	2010 XA_{85}	—	March 20, 2004	Kitt Peak	Spacewatch	·	1.5 km	MPC · JPL
419841	2010 XB_{85}	—	November 12, 2010	Kitt Peak	Spacewatch	EUN	1.3 km	MPC · JPL
419842	2010 XN_{87}	—	December 7, 2005	Kitt Peak	Spacewatch	·	1.9 km	MPC · JPL
419843	2010 YX_{2}	—	December 10, 2010	Mount Lemmon	Mount Lemmon Survey	·	2.0 km	MPC · JPL
419844	2010 YP_{5}	—	January 17, 2007	Kitt Peak	Spacewatch	·	910 m	MPC · JPL
419845	2011 AO	—	January 9, 2007	Kitt Peak	Spacewatch	·	1.8 km	MPC · JPL
419846	2011 AH_{4}	—	December 8, 2010	Catalina	CSS	·	2.7 km	MPC · JPL
419847	2011 AO_{5}	—	March 18, 2004	Socorro	LINEAR	·	1.7 km	MPC · JPL
419848	2011 AO_{7}	—	December 11, 2001	Socorro	LINEAR	JUN	1.0 km	MPC · JPL
419849	2011 AO_{8}	—	December 5, 2010	Kitt Peak	Spacewatch	·	1.7 km	MPC · JPL
419850	2011 AT_{9}	—	December 10, 2010	Mount Lemmon	Mount Lemmon Survey	·	2.4 km	MPC · JPL
419851	2011 AY_{9}	—	October 12, 2010	Kitt Peak	Spacewatch	·	1.2 km	MPC · JPL
419852	2011 AG_{10}	—	October 21, 2001	Socorro	LINEAR	·	1.3 km	MPC · JPL
419853	2011 AM_{10}	—	December 25, 2005	Mount Lemmon	Mount Lemmon Survey	·	1.7 km	MPC · JPL
419854	2011 AQ_{10}	—	December 16, 2006	Kitt Peak	Spacewatch	·	1.1 km	MPC · JPL
419855	2011 AW_{11}	—	December 6, 2010	Mount Lemmon	Mount Lemmon Survey	·	1.2 km	MPC · JPL
419856	2011 AX_{11}	—	December 13, 2010	Mount Lemmon	Mount Lemmon Survey	·	1.9 km	MPC · JPL
419857	2011 AB_{12}	—	September 25, 2005	Palomar	NEAT	·	1.9 km	MPC · JPL
419858 Abecheng	2011 AC_{13}	Abecheng	February 1, 2010	WISE	WISE	·	3.5 km	MPC · JPL
419859	2011 AU_{14}	—	November 27, 2006	Mount Lemmon	Mount Lemmon Survey	MAR	1.0 km	MPC · JPL
419860	2011 AX_{14}	—	January 31, 2006	Anderson Mesa	LONEOS	·	3.4 km	MPC · JPL
419861	2011 AD_{15}	—	October 25, 2008	Kitt Peak	Spacewatch	·	3.6 km	MPC · JPL
419862	2011 AP_{15}	—	December 1, 2010	Mount Lemmon	Mount Lemmon Survey	·	3.6 km	MPC · JPL
419863	2011 AW_{15}	—	May 3, 2008	Kitt Peak	Spacewatch	EUN	1.5 km	MPC · JPL
419864	2011 AV_{20}	—	September 26, 2009	Kitt Peak	Spacewatch	·	1.8 km	MPC · JPL
419865	2011 AR_{21}	—	January 10, 2007	Kitt Peak	Spacewatch	·	1.0 km	MPC · JPL
419866	2011 AB_{22}	—	February 23, 2007	Catalina	CSS	EUN	1.5 km	MPC · JPL
419867	2011 AF_{24}	—	November 4, 2005	Mount Lemmon	Mount Lemmon Survey	·	2.0 km	MPC · JPL
419868	2011 AG_{24}	—	December 27, 2006	Mount Lemmon	Mount Lemmon Survey	·	1.4 km	MPC · JPL
419869	2011 AL_{27}	—	January 31, 2006	Catalina	CSS	EOS	2.3 km	MPC · JPL
419870	2011 AP_{27}	—	September 9, 2004	Kitt Peak	Spacewatch	·	2.3 km	MPC · JPL
419871	2011 AV_{27}	—	November 21, 2006	Mount Lemmon	Mount Lemmon Survey	·	950 m	MPC · JPL
419872	2011 AW_{27}	—	September 26, 2005	Kitt Peak	Spacewatch	·	1.5 km	MPC · JPL
419873	2011 AK_{32}	—	December 18, 2001	Socorro	LINEAR	·	1.1 km	MPC · JPL
419874	2011 AL_{32}	—	December 17, 2001	Socorro	LINEAR	·	1.7 km	MPC · JPL
419875	2011 AP_{33}	—	February 21, 2007	Mount Lemmon	Mount Lemmon Survey	·	1.6 km	MPC · JPL
419876	2011 AT_{33}	—	August 20, 2009	Kitt Peak	Spacewatch	·	2.0 km	MPC · JPL
419877	2011 AY_{33}	—	February 17, 2007	Kitt Peak	Spacewatch	·	1.2 km	MPC · JPL
419878	2011 AF_{35}	—	December 31, 2002	Socorro	LINEAR	·	1.9 km	MPC · JPL
419879	2011 AO_{35}	—	November 16, 2010	Mount Lemmon	Mount Lemmon Survey	·	2.7 km	MPC · JPL
419880	2011 AH_{37}	—	January 7, 2011	WISE	WISE	APO · PHA	980 m	MPC · JPL
419881	2011 AW_{38}	—	November 22, 2006	Mount Lemmon	Mount Lemmon Survey	·	1.1 km	MPC · JPL
419882	2011 AS_{39}	—	December 5, 2010	Mount Lemmon	Mount Lemmon Survey	EOS	2.1 km	MPC · JPL
419883	2011 AO_{40}	—	January 5, 1994	Kitt Peak	Spacewatch	·	4.3 km	MPC · JPL
419884	2011 AL_{41}	—	March 20, 2007	Mount Lemmon	Mount Lemmon Survey	·	1.7 km	MPC · JPL
419885	2011 AG_{42}	—	January 28, 2007	Mount Lemmon	Mount Lemmon Survey	MIS	2.0 km	MPC · JPL
419886	2011 AQ_{43}	—	November 3, 2010	Kitt Peak	Spacewatch	EMA	3.6 km	MPC · JPL
419887	2011 AL_{45}	—	November 11, 2010	Kitt Peak	Spacewatch	·	2.3 km	MPC · JPL
419888	2011 AW_{45}	—	January 10, 2011	Kitt Peak	Spacewatch	EOS	1.9 km	MPC · JPL
419889	2011 AX_{45}	—	January 10, 2011	Kitt Peak	Spacewatch	DOR	2.8 km	MPC · JPL
419890	2011 AY_{49}	—	October 29, 2005	Mount Lemmon	Mount Lemmon Survey	MIS	2.4 km	MPC · JPL
419891	2011 AW_{52}	—	March 13, 2007	Catalina	CSS	EUN	1.4 km	MPC · JPL
419892	2011 AS_{53}	—	September 6, 1997	Caussols	ODAS	·	1.2 km	MPC · JPL
419893	2011 AE_{54}	—	December 6, 2010	Mount Lemmon	Mount Lemmon Survey	·	1.3 km	MPC · JPL
419894	2011 AU_{54}	—	September 29, 2005	Mount Lemmon	Mount Lemmon Survey	·	1.2 km	MPC · JPL
419895	2011 AV_{60}	—	February 9, 2007	Kitt Peak	Spacewatch	·	1.2 km	MPC · JPL
419896	2011 AQ_{61}	—	March 10, 2007	Palomar	NEAT	·	1.5 km	MPC · JPL
419897	2011 AY_{61}	—	October 12, 2005	Kitt Peak	Spacewatch	·	1.2 km	MPC · JPL
419898	2011 AO_{65}	—	January 17, 2007	Kitt Peak	Spacewatch	(5)	1.0 km	MPC · JPL
419899	2011 AG_{66}	—	January 14, 2011	Kitt Peak	Spacewatch	·	1.6 km	MPC · JPL
419900	2011 AN_{67}	—	November 1, 2006	Mount Lemmon	Mount Lemmon Survey	·	1.9 km	MPC · JPL

== 419901–420000 ==
back to top

Designation			Discovery			Properties		Ref
Permanent	Provisional	Named after	Date	Site	Discoverer(s)	Category	Diam.	Ref
419901	2011 AQ_{67}	—	February 21, 2007	Kitt Peak	Spacewatch	·	1.4 km	MPC · JPL
419902	2011 AT_{67}	—	December 3, 2010	Mount Lemmon	Mount Lemmon Survey	·	2.1 km	MPC · JPL
419903	2011 AG_{74}	—	July 28, 2008	Mount Lemmon	Mount Lemmon Survey	·	2.0 km	MPC · JPL
419904	2011 AW_{74}	—	December 21, 2006	Mount Lemmon	Mount Lemmon Survey	·	1.4 km	MPC · JPL
419905	2011 AY_{74}	—	November 23, 2006	Mount Lemmon	Mount Lemmon Survey	·	2.2 km	MPC · JPL
419906	2011 AW_{79}	—	January 17, 2007	Catalina	CSS	·	2.0 km	MPC · JPL
419907	2011 BQ_{1}	—	January 27, 2007	Mount Lemmon	Mount Lemmon Survey	·	1.4 km	MPC · JPL
419908	2011 BB_{6}	—	February 23, 2007	Kitt Peak	Spacewatch	·	1.4 km	MPC · JPL
419909	2011 BC_{6}	—	October 1, 2005	Mount Lemmon	Mount Lemmon Survey	MIS	2.1 km	MPC · JPL
419910	2011 BD_{7}	—	December 28, 2005	Kitt Peak	Spacewatch	·	2.0 km	MPC · JPL
419911	2011 BM_{8}	—	August 28, 2005	Kitt Peak	Spacewatch	·	970 m	MPC · JPL
419912	2011 BR_{9}	—	January 16, 2011	Mount Lemmon	Mount Lemmon Survey	·	2.9 km	MPC · JPL
419913	2011 BM_{10}	—	January 4, 2006	Mount Lemmon	Mount Lemmon Survey	·	2.1 km	MPC · JPL
419914	2011 BK_{12}	—	December 1, 2005	Kitt Peak	Spacewatch	·	2.1 km	MPC · JPL
419915	2011 BU_{12}	—	January 13, 2011	Kitt Peak	Spacewatch	·	1.8 km	MPC · JPL
419916	2011 BC_{13}	—	January 26, 2010	WISE	WISE	·	2.9 km	MPC · JPL
419917	2011 BA_{14}	—	October 10, 2005	Catalina	CSS	ADE	2.4 km	MPC · JPL
419918	2011 BQ_{16}	—	September 17, 2009	Kitt Peak	Spacewatch	HOF	2.6 km	MPC · JPL
419919	2011 BF_{19}	—	November 30, 2005	Mount Lemmon	Mount Lemmon Survey	·	1.6 km	MPC · JPL
419920	2011 BN_{21}	—	January 23, 2006	Catalina	CSS	·	2.1 km	MPC · JPL
419921	2011 BB_{23}	—	September 18, 2009	Kitt Peak	Spacewatch	·	1.6 km	MPC · JPL
419922	2011 BJ_{24}	—	January 28, 2011	Catalina	CSS	APO +1km	1.0 km	MPC · JPL
419923	2011 BF_{27}	—	February 4, 2006	Mount Lemmon	Mount Lemmon Survey	·	2.3 km	MPC · JPL
419924	2011 BT_{29}	—	December 9, 2010	Mount Lemmon	Mount Lemmon Survey	·	2.2 km	MPC · JPL
419925	2011 BO_{31}	—	January 11, 2011	Kitt Peak	Spacewatch	·	1.7 km	MPC · JPL
419926	2011 BD_{33}	—	December 6, 2005	Kitt Peak	Spacewatch	HOF	2.4 km	MPC · JPL
419927	2011 BW_{33}	—	January 14, 2011	Kitt Peak	Spacewatch	·	1.7 km	MPC · JPL
419928	2011 BE_{35}	—	October 19, 2006	Kitt Peak	Deep Ecliptic Survey	·	1.1 km	MPC · JPL
419929	2011 BL_{44}	—	December 26, 2005	Kitt Peak	Spacewatch	GEF	1.5 km	MPC · JPL
419930	2011 BO_{51}	—	August 29, 2009	Kitt Peak	Spacewatch	·	2.0 km	MPC · JPL
419931	2011 BP_{51}	—	February 8, 2007	Palomar	NEAT	·	960 m	MPC · JPL
419932	2011 BC_{52}	—	March 25, 2006	Catalina	CSS	·	3.9 km	MPC · JPL
419933	2011 BQ_{54}	—	August 5, 2005	Palomar	NEAT	·	1.3 km	MPC · JPL
419934	2011 BE_{55}	—	February 23, 2007	Kitt Peak	Spacewatch	·	1.2 km	MPC · JPL
419935	2011 BG_{55}	—	August 23, 2004	Kitt Peak	Spacewatch	BRA	1.3 km	MPC · JPL
419936	2011 BK_{62}	—	December 29, 2005	Kitt Peak	Spacewatch	·	1.7 km	MPC · JPL
419937	2011 BQ_{62}	—	January 26, 2011	Mount Lemmon	Mount Lemmon Survey	·	1.6 km	MPC · JPL
419938	2011 BG_{68}	—	January 10, 2011	Mount Lemmon	Mount Lemmon Survey	·	1.8 km	MPC · JPL
419939	2011 BL_{75}	—	January 17, 2011	Mount Lemmon	Mount Lemmon Survey	(18466)	2.5 km	MPC · JPL
419940	2011 BC_{79}	—	November 24, 2006	Mount Lemmon	Mount Lemmon Survey	·	1.3 km	MPC · JPL
419941	2011 BB_{80}	—	January 11, 2011	Kitt Peak	Spacewatch	·	2.8 km	MPC · JPL
419942	2011 BD_{82}	—	December 4, 2005	Kitt Peak	Spacewatch	MRX	1.1 km	MPC · JPL
419943	2011 BL_{82}	—	January 10, 2007	Kitt Peak	Spacewatch	·	1.2 km	MPC · JPL
419944	2011 BQ_{82}	—	January 13, 2010	WISE	WISE	·	4.3 km	MPC · JPL
419945	2011 BW_{82}	—	January 11, 2011	Kitt Peak	Spacewatch	AGN	1.4 km	MPC · JPL
419946	2011 BX_{82}	—	December 8, 2010	Mount Lemmon	Mount Lemmon Survey	·	1.7 km	MPC · JPL
419947	2011 BJ_{84}	—	December 8, 2005	Kitt Peak	Spacewatch	·	5.4 km	MPC · JPL
419948	2011 BY_{86}	—	March 15, 2007	Kitt Peak	Spacewatch	·	1.7 km	MPC · JPL
419949	2011 BB_{89}	—	January 16, 2011	Mount Lemmon	Mount Lemmon Survey	EOS	2.0 km	MPC · JPL
419950	2011 BE_{89}	—	February 17, 2007	Kitt Peak	Spacewatch	(5)	1.3 km	MPC · JPL
419951	2011 BA_{90}	—	October 15, 2009	Mount Lemmon	Mount Lemmon Survey	·	1.5 km	MPC · JPL
419952	2011 BW_{94}	—	November 5, 2010	Mount Lemmon	Mount Lemmon Survey	·	1.7 km	MPC · JPL
419953	2011 BF_{96}	—	January 24, 2007	Kitt Peak	Spacewatch	·	1.0 km	MPC · JPL
419954	2011 BH_{96}	—	February 5, 2000	Kitt Peak	Spacewatch	URS	3.4 km	MPC · JPL
419955	2011 BV_{96}	—	September 9, 2008	Mount Lemmon	Mount Lemmon Survey	·	2.0 km	MPC · JPL
419956	2011 BM_{99}	—	October 28, 2005	Kitt Peak	Spacewatch	·	1.5 km	MPC · JPL
419957	2011 BW_{99}	—	February 16, 2010	WISE	WISE	·	4.1 km	MPC · JPL
419958	2011 BM_{100}	—	March 13, 2007	Catalina	CSS	·	1.4 km	MPC · JPL
419959	2011 BO_{100}	—	December 10, 2004	Kitt Peak	Spacewatch	EOS	2.2 km	MPC · JPL
419960	2011 BW_{100}	—	March 1, 2010	WISE	WISE	·	3.4 km	MPC · JPL
419961	2011 BL_{102}	—	January 27, 2007	Kitt Peak	Spacewatch	·	1.2 km	MPC · JPL
419962	2011 BT_{102}	—	October 14, 2010	Mount Lemmon	Mount Lemmon Survey	·	2.1 km	MPC · JPL
419963	2011 BH_{114}	—	October 26, 2009	Kitt Peak	Spacewatch	·	1.6 km	MPC · JPL
419964	2011 BW_{117}	—	August 27, 2005	Palomar	NEAT	·	1.2 km	MPC · JPL
419965	2011 BU_{118}	—	December 30, 2005	Mount Lemmon	Mount Lemmon Survey	·	2.4 km	MPC · JPL
419966	2011 BY_{140}	—	January 23, 2006	Kitt Peak	Spacewatch	·	1.9 km	MPC · JPL
419967	2011 BO_{154}	—	January 27, 2011	Kitt Peak	Spacewatch	·	3.2 km	MPC · JPL
419968	2011 BN_{161}	—	October 22, 2009	Mount Lemmon	Mount Lemmon Survey	·	2.1 km	MPC · JPL
419969	2011 BZ_{161}	—	December 4, 2005	Kitt Peak	Spacewatch	AGN	1.1 km	MPC · JPL
419970	2011 BC_{162}	—	December 2, 2010	Mount Lemmon	Mount Lemmon Survey	EOS	2.8 km	MPC · JPL
419971	2011 BJ_{162}	—	January 21, 2002	Kitt Peak	Spacewatch	·	1.9 km	MPC · JPL
419972	2011 CO	—	March 12, 2007	Kitt Peak	Spacewatch	·	2.3 km	MPC · JPL
419973	2011 CQ	—	September 12, 2009	Kitt Peak	Spacewatch	·	1.8 km	MPC · JPL
419974	2011 CK_{3}	—	December 7, 1999	Kitt Peak	Spacewatch	·	2.9 km	MPC · JPL
419975	2011 CM_{3}	—	September 21, 2003	Anderson Mesa	LONEOS	EOS	2.8 km	MPC · JPL
419976	2011 CD_{4}	—	February 27, 2007	Kitt Peak	Spacewatch	(5)	1.2 km	MPC · JPL
419977	2011 CL_{5}	—	February 21, 2007	Kitt Peak	Spacewatch	·	1.4 km	MPC · JPL
419978	2011 CN_{9}	—	January 14, 2011	Kitt Peak	Spacewatch	·	2.3 km	MPC · JPL
419979	2011 CP_{10}	—	January 11, 2011	Kitt Peak	Spacewatch	·	2.3 km	MPC · JPL
419980	2011 CX_{14}	—	September 20, 2001	Socorro	LINEAR	·	990 m	MPC · JPL
419981	2011 CU_{15}	—	March 16, 2007	Mount Lemmon	Mount Lemmon Survey	·	1.8 km	MPC · JPL
419982	2011 CZ_{16}	—	September 19, 2009	Mount Lemmon	Mount Lemmon Survey	·	1.4 km	MPC · JPL
419983	2011 CV_{19}	—	March 19, 2007	Mount Lemmon	Mount Lemmon Survey	·	1.8 km	MPC · JPL
419984	2011 CP_{22}	—	January 9, 1997	Kitt Peak	Spacewatch	MRX	900 m	MPC · JPL
419985	2011 CG_{23}	—	February 10, 2002	Socorro	LINEAR	·	1.4 km	MPC · JPL
419986	2011 CE_{26}	—	December 7, 2005	Kitt Peak	Spacewatch	AGN	1.3 km	MPC · JPL
419987	2011 CK_{27}	—	February 10, 2002	Socorro	LINEAR	·	1.8 km	MPC · JPL
419988	2011 CK_{29}	—	December 2, 2005	Kitt Peak	Spacewatch	·	1.6 km	MPC · JPL
419989	2011 CS_{29}	—	January 30, 2011	Mount Lemmon	Mount Lemmon Survey	·	1.4 km	MPC · JPL
419990	2011 CF_{32}	—	September 14, 2009	Catalina	CSS	·	1.6 km	MPC · JPL
419991	2011 CH_{32}	—	April 20, 2007	Kitt Peak	Spacewatch	KOR	1.2 km	MPC · JPL
419992	2011 CU_{32}	—	January 14, 2011	Kitt Peak	Spacewatch	·	1.7 km	MPC · JPL
419993	2011 CW_{32}	—	November 16, 2010	Mount Lemmon	Mount Lemmon Survey	·	3.6 km	MPC · JPL
419994	2011 CB_{33}	—	January 27, 2011	Mount Lemmon	Mount Lemmon Survey	·	1.9 km	MPC · JPL
419995	2011 CT_{35}	—	February 28, 2000	Kitt Peak	Spacewatch	VER	2.8 km	MPC · JPL
419996	2011 CC_{38}	—	December 4, 2005	Kitt Peak	Spacewatch	AGN	1.1 km	MPC · JPL
419997	2011 CX_{38}	—	December 24, 2005	Kitt Peak	Spacewatch	·	1.6 km	MPC · JPL
419998	2011 CE_{40}	—	January 11, 2011	Kitt Peak	Spacewatch	EOS	1.8 km	MPC · JPL
419999	2011 CW_{42}	—	December 5, 2005	Kitt Peak	Spacewatch	·	2.1 km	MPC · JPL
420000	2011 CU_{45}	—	May 1, 2003	Kitt Peak	Spacewatch	·	1.7 km	MPC · JPL

back to top

== Meaning of names ==
As minor planet discoveries are confirmed, they are given a permanent number by the IAU's Minor Planet Center (MPC), and the discoverers can then submit names for them, following the IAU's naming conventions. The list below concerns those minor planets in the specified number-range that have received names, and explains the meanings of those names.

Official naming citations of newly named small Solar System bodies are approved and published in a bulletin by IAU's Working Group for Small Bodies Nomenclature (WGSBN). Before May 2021, citations were published in MPC's Minor Planet Circulars for many decades. Recent citations can also be found on the JPL Small-Body Database (SBDB). Until his death in 2016, German astronomer Lutz D. Schmadel compiled these citations into the Dictionary of Minor Planet Names (DMP) and regularly updated the collection.

Based on Paul Herget's The Names of the Minor Planets, Schmadel also researched the unclear origin of numerous asteroids, most of which had been named prior to World War II. This article incorporates text from this source, which is in the public domain: SBDB New namings may only be added to this list below after official publication as the preannouncement of names is condemned. The WGSBN publishes a comprehensive guideline for the naming rules of non-cometary small Solar System bodies.

Named minor planet	Provisional	This minor planet was named for...	Ref · Catalog
419435 Tiramisu	2010 CW_{43}	Tiramisu, a coffee-flavored Italian dessert. The name was suggested by Annick Merlin, wife of French astronomer Jean-Claude Merlin, who discovered this minor planet.	IAU · 419435
419521 Meursault	2010 JQ_{34}	Meursault, is a French village situated south of Beaune: Meursault white wine is a Burgundy wine.	IAU · 419521
419858 Abecheng	2011 AC_{13}	Abe Cheng (1953–2021) was a space physicist. He served on NASA's Stratospheric Observatory for Infrared Astronomy (SOFIA) as a senior engineer, preparing the observatory's computer systems for flight and transferring its astronomical data to its scientific teams.	IAU · 419858
