= List of minor planets: 370001–371000 =

The following is a partial list of minor planets, running from minor-planet number 370001 through 371000, inclusive. The primary data for this and other partial lists is based on JPL's "Small-Body Orbital Elements" and data available from the Minor Planet Center. Critical list information is also provided by the MPC, unless otherwise specified from Lowell Observatory. A detailed description of the table's columns and additional sources are given on the main page including a complete list of every page in this series, and a statistical break-up on the dynamical classification of minor planets.

Also see the summary list of all named bodies in numerical and alphabetical order, and the corresponding naming citations for the number range of this particular list. New namings may only be added to this list after official publication, as the preannouncement of names is condemned by the Working Group for Small Bodies Nomenclature of the International Astronomical Union.

Near-Earth obj.	MBA (inner)	MBA (outer)	Centaur
Mars-crosser	MBA (middle)	Jupiter trojan	Trans-Neptunian obj.
Unclassified

== 370001–370100 ==
Designation			Discovery			Properties		Ref
Permanent	Provisional	Named after	Date	Site	Discoverer(s)	Category	Diam.	Ref
370001	1999 TX_{128}	—	October 6, 1999	Socorro	LINEAR	·	910 m	MPC · JPL
370002	1999 TP_{140}	—	October 6, 1999	Socorro	LINEAR	·	1.1 km	MPC · JPL
370003	1999 TX_{144}	—	October 7, 1999	Socorro	LINEAR	·	900 m	MPC · JPL
370004	1999 TM_{145}	—	October 7, 1999	Socorro	LINEAR	·	890 m	MPC · JPL
370005	1999 TO_{161}	—	October 9, 1999	Socorro	LINEAR	NYS	980 m	MPC · JPL
370006	1999 TF_{295}	—	October 1, 1999	Kitt Peak	Spacewatch	·	3.6 km	MPC · JPL
370007	1999 VT_{136}	—	November 12, 1999	Socorro	LINEAR	·	1.4 km	MPC · JPL
370008	1999 VH_{161}	—	November 14, 1999	Socorro	LINEAR	·	1.1 km	MPC · JPL
370009	1999 WD_{25}	—	November 28, 1999	Kitt Peak	Spacewatch	·	680 m	MPC · JPL
370010	1999 XQ_{252}	—	December 12, 1999	Kitt Peak	Spacewatch	MAS	490 m	MPC · JPL
370011	2000 AD_{42}	—	January 6, 2000	Kleť	Kleť	ERI	1.5 km	MPC · JPL
370012	2000 AO_{129}	—	January 5, 2000	Socorro	LINEAR	·	1.3 km	MPC · JPL
370013	2000 AY_{212}	—	January 6, 2000	Kitt Peak	Spacewatch	NAE	5.4 km	MPC · JPL
370014	2000 CW_{74}	—	February 8, 2000	Kitt Peak	Spacewatch	NYS	1.1 km	MPC · JPL
370015	2000 CE_{143}	—	February 4, 2000	Kitt Peak	Spacewatch	EOS	2.6 km	MPC · JPL
370016	2000 DS_{17}	—	February 29, 2000	Socorro	LINEAR	·	1.5 km	MPC · JPL
370017	2000 DE_{67}	—	January 27, 2000	Kitt Peak	Spacewatch	·	3.3 km	MPC · JPL
370018	2000 DC_{87}	—	February 29, 2000	Socorro	LINEAR	·	1.9 km	MPC · JPL
370019	2000 EW_{33}	—	March 5, 2000	Socorro	LINEAR	·	1.7 km	MPC · JPL
370020	2000 EH_{51}	—	March 3, 2000	Kitt Peak	Spacewatch	·	1.8 km	MPC · JPL
370021	2000 EO_{51}	—	March 3, 2000	Kitt Peak	Spacewatch	·	3.3 km	MPC · JPL
370022	2000 ES_{123}	—	March 11, 2000	Anderson Mesa	LONEOS	·	2.1 km	MPC · JPL
370023	2000 EH_{178}	—	March 4, 2000	Kitt Peak	Spacewatch	·	1.1 km	MPC · JPL
370024	2000 GF	—	April 1, 2000	Kitt Peak	Spacewatch	·	1.2 km	MPC · JPL
370025	2000 HO_{16}	—	April 24, 2000	Kitt Peak	Spacewatch	·	3.5 km	MPC · JPL
370026	2000 OK_{56}	—	July 29, 2000	Anderson Mesa	LONEOS	·	2.6 km	MPC · JPL
370027	2000 PK_{29}	—	August 1, 2000	Socorro	LINEAR	·	610 m	MPC · JPL
370028	2000 QO_{52}	—	August 2, 2000	Socorro	LINEAR	·	2.1 km	MPC · JPL
370029	2000 QN_{64}	—	August 28, 2000	Socorro	LINEAR	·	2.0 km	MPC · JPL
370030	2000 QV_{81}	—	August 24, 2000	Socorro	LINEAR	·	2.1 km	MPC · JPL
370031	2000 QS_{147}	—	August 31, 2000	Socorro	LINEAR	H	600 m	MPC · JPL
370032	2000 RZ_{18}	—	September 1, 2000	Socorro	LINEAR	EUN	1.4 km	MPC · JPL
370033	2000 RB_{105}	—	September 6, 2000	Socorro	LINEAR	·	2.3 km	MPC · JPL
370034	2000 SB_{3}	—	September 21, 2000	Haleakala	NEAT	·	2.2 km	MPC · JPL
370035	2000 SB_{5}	—	September 20, 2000	Socorro	LINEAR	·	2.5 km	MPC · JPL
370036	2000 SH_{7}	—	September 20, 2000	Kitt Peak	Spacewatch	·	2.1 km	MPC · JPL
370037	2000 SV_{20}	—	September 24, 2000	Socorro	LINEAR	AMO	450 m	MPC · JPL
370038	2000 SN_{27}	—	September 23, 2000	Socorro	LINEAR	·	2.1 km	MPC · JPL
370039	2000 SO_{39}	—	September 24, 2000	Socorro	LINEAR	·	800 m	MPC · JPL
370040	2000 SC_{44}	—	September 23, 2000	Socorro	LINEAR	H	710 m	MPC · JPL
370041	2000 SL_{69}	—	September 24, 2000	Socorro	LINEAR	·	1.7 km	MPC · JPL
370042	2000 SV_{69}	—	September 24, 2000	Socorro	LINEAR	EUN	1.5 km	MPC · JPL
370043	2000 SX_{81}	—	September 24, 2000	Socorro	LINEAR	slow	1.5 km	MPC · JPL
370044	2000 SY_{131}	—	September 22, 2000	Socorro	LINEAR	EUN	1.7 km	MPC · JPL
370045	2000 SA_{138}	—	September 23, 2000	Socorro	LINEAR	·	2.1 km	MPC · JPL
370046	2000 SN_{152}	—	September 24, 2000	Socorro	LINEAR	·	850 m	MPC · JPL
370047	2000 SJ_{193}	—	August 31, 2000	Socorro	LINEAR	·	840 m	MPC · JPL
370048	2000 SF_{224}	—	September 27, 2000	Socorro	LINEAR	·	1.9 km	MPC · JPL
370049	2000 SP_{231}	—	September 24, 2000	Socorro	LINEAR	·	1.9 km	MPC · JPL
370050	2000 SX_{267}	—	September 27, 2000	Socorro	LINEAR	·	2.5 km	MPC · JPL
370051	2000 SV_{296}	—	September 28, 2000	Socorro	LINEAR	ADE	3.8 km	MPC · JPL
370052	2000 SM_{308}	—	September 30, 2000	Socorro	LINEAR	JUN	1.4 km	MPC · JPL
370053	2000 SR_{357}	—	September 28, 2000	Anderson Mesa	LONEOS	·	3.4 km	MPC · JPL
370054	2000 TO_{29}	—	October 3, 2000	Socorro	LINEAR	·	2.4 km	MPC · JPL
370055	2000 TE_{63}	—	October 3, 2000	Anderson Mesa	LONEOS	JUN	1.4 km	MPC · JPL
370056	2000 UC_{76}	—	October 25, 2000	Socorro	LINEAR	·	2.1 km	MPC · JPL
370057	2000 UN_{109}	—	October 31, 2000	Socorro	LINEAR	·	2.9 km	MPC · JPL
370058	2000 VU_{11}	—	November 1, 2000	Socorro	LINEAR	·	3.2 km	MPC · JPL
370059	2000 WR_{150}	—	November 19, 2000	Socorro	LINEAR	H	760 m	MPC · JPL
370060	2000 WR_{156}	—	November 30, 2000	Socorro	LINEAR	·	1.1 km	MPC · JPL
370061	2000 YO_{29}	—	December 28, 2000	Socorro	LINEAR	APO +1km	970 m	MPC · JPL
370062	2001 AR_{49}	—	January 15, 2001	Kitt Peak	Spacewatch	·	2.7 km	MPC · JPL
370063	2001 BP_{38}	—	January 17, 2001	Oizumi	T. Kobayashi	·	2.6 km	MPC · JPL
370064	2001 BS_{46}	—	January 21, 2001	Socorro	LINEAR	·	2.7 km	MPC · JPL
370065	2001 CX_{47}	—	February 12, 2001	Anderson Mesa	LONEOS	·	2.9 km	MPC · JPL
370066	2001 FF_{120}	—	March 28, 2001	Kitt Peak	Spacewatch	EOS	2.4 km	MPC · JPL
370067	2001 FZ_{147}	—	March 24, 2001	Anderson Mesa	LONEOS	PHO	1.3 km	MPC · JPL
370068 Chrisholmberg	2001 FB_{216}	Chrisholmberg	March 21, 2001	Kitt Peak	SKADS	EOS	1.6 km	MPC · JPL
370069	2001 NW_{18}	—	July 13, 2001	Palomar	NEAT	·	5.5 km	MPC · JPL
370070	2001 PU_{48}	—	August 14, 2001	Palomar	NEAT	THB	3.3 km	MPC · JPL
370071	2001 QK_{82}	—	August 17, 2001	Socorro	LINEAR	·	2.4 km	MPC · JPL
370072	2001 QA_{154}	—	August 28, 2001	Ondřejov	L. Kotková	·	1.5 km	MPC · JPL
370073	2001 RZ_{64}	—	September 10, 2001	Socorro	LINEAR	·	970 m	MPC · JPL
370074	2001 RW_{83}	—	September 11, 2001	Anderson Mesa	LONEOS	·	870 m	MPC · JPL
370075	2001 RZ_{94}	—	September 11, 2001	Anderson Mesa	LONEOS	(5)	1.2 km	MPC · JPL
370076	2001 RX_{104}	—	September 12, 2001	Socorro	LINEAR	THM	2.5 km	MPC · JPL
370077	2001 RR_{118}	—	September 12, 2001	Socorro	LINEAR	PHO	1.1 km	MPC · JPL
370078	2001 RL_{138}	—	September 12, 2001	Socorro	LINEAR	·	1.1 km	MPC · JPL
370079	2001 SP_{96}	—	September 20, 2001	Socorro	LINEAR	·	840 m	MPC · JPL
370080	2001 SD_{131}	—	September 16, 2001	Socorro	LINEAR	·	1.2 km	MPC · JPL
370081	2001 SJ_{136}	—	September 16, 2001	Socorro	LINEAR	·	1.1 km	MPC · JPL
370082	2001 SF_{152}	—	September 17, 2001	Socorro	LINEAR	·	1.2 km	MPC · JPL
370083	2001 SK_{161}	—	September 17, 2001	Socorro	LINEAR	·	1.2 km	MPC · JPL
370084	2001 SY_{167}	—	September 19, 2001	Socorro	LINEAR	·	1.4 km	MPC · JPL
370085	2001 ST_{209}	—	September 19, 2001	Socorro	LINEAR	·	970 m	MPC · JPL
370086	2001 SS_{220}	—	September 19, 2001	Socorro	LINEAR	·	970 m	MPC · JPL
370087	2001 SG_{221}	—	September 19, 2001	Socorro	LINEAR	L5	8.6 km	MPC · JPL
370088	2001 SN_{224}	—	September 19, 2001	Socorro	LINEAR	·	1.0 km	MPC · JPL
370089	2001 SX_{233}	—	September 19, 2001	Socorro	LINEAR	·	1.1 km	MPC · JPL
370090	2001 SF_{241}	—	September 19, 2001	Socorro	LINEAR	·	1.0 km	MPC · JPL
370091	2001 SL_{274}	—	September 20, 2001	Kitt Peak	Spacewatch	·	4.4 km	MPC · JPL
370092	2001 SR_{298}	—	September 20, 2001	Socorro	LINEAR	·	820 m	MPC · JPL
370093	2001 SZ_{320}	—	September 23, 2001	Socorro	LINEAR	·	810 m	MPC · JPL
370094	2001 SF_{333}	—	September 19, 2001	Palomar	NEAT	·	1.9 km	MPC · JPL
370095	2001 SY_{338}	—	September 20, 2001	Kitt Peak	Spacewatch	·	650 m	MPC · JPL
370096	2001 TP_{6}	—	October 10, 2001	Palomar	NEAT	·	1.4 km	MPC · JPL
370097	2001 TL_{10}	—	October 13, 2001	Socorro	LINEAR	·	1.5 km	MPC · JPL
370098	2001 TX_{26}	—	October 14, 2001	Socorro	LINEAR	·	910 m	MPC · JPL
370099	2001 TO_{59}	—	October 13, 2001	Socorro	LINEAR	(5)	1.1 km	MPC · JPL
370100	2001 TD_{74}	—	October 13, 2001	Socorro	LINEAR	·	1.8 km	MPC · JPL

== 370101–370200 ==
back to top

Designation			Discovery			Properties		Ref
Permanent	Provisional	Named after	Date	Site	Discoverer(s)	Category	Diam.	Ref
370101	2001 TV_{88}	—	October 14, 2001	Socorro	LINEAR	·	1.0 km	MPC · JPL
370102	2001 TZ_{88}	—	October 14, 2001	Socorro	LINEAR	·	1.5 km	MPC · JPL
370103	2001 TT_{108}	—	October 14, 2001	Socorro	LINEAR	·	1.1 km	MPC · JPL
370104	2001 TT_{110}	—	October 14, 2001	Socorro	LINEAR	·	1.3 km	MPC · JPL
370105	2001 TA_{132}	—	October 11, 2001	Palomar	NEAT	L5	15 km	MPC · JPL
370106	2001 TT_{156}	—	October 14, 2001	Kitt Peak	Spacewatch	·	640 m	MPC · JPL
370107	2001 TW_{161}	—	October 11, 2001	Palomar	NEAT	·	990 m	MPC · JPL
370108	2001 TU_{179}	—	October 14, 2001	Socorro	LINEAR	(5)	1 km	MPC · JPL
370109	2001 TQ_{210}	—	October 13, 2001	Palomar	NEAT	·	1.4 km	MPC · JPL
370110	2001 TP_{214}	—	October 13, 2001	Palomar	NEAT	·	750 m	MPC · JPL
370111	2001 TZ_{240}	—	October 14, 2001	Socorro	LINEAR	·	930 m	MPC · JPL
370112	2001 UJ_{7}	—	October 17, 2001	Socorro	LINEAR	·	1.4 km	MPC · JPL
370113	2001 UJ_{35}	—	October 16, 2001	Socorro	LINEAR	·	1.2 km	MPC · JPL
370114	2001 UY_{59}	—	October 17, 2001	Socorro	LINEAR	(5)	1.3 km	MPC · JPL
370115	2001 UQ_{71}	—	October 19, 2001	Kitt Peak	Spacewatch	·	980 m	MPC · JPL
370116	2001 UB_{83}	—	October 20, 2001	Socorro	LINEAR	·	1.2 km	MPC · JPL
370117	2001 UY_{106}	—	October 20, 2001	Socorro	LINEAR	(5)	960 m	MPC · JPL
370118	2001 UG_{109}	—	October 20, 2001	Socorro	LINEAR	·	1.8 km	MPC · JPL
370119	2001 UF_{121}	—	October 22, 2001	Socorro	LINEAR	·	1.4 km	MPC · JPL
370120	2001 UM_{150}	—	October 23, 2001	Socorro	LINEAR	(5)	1.4 km	MPC · JPL
370121	2001 UN_{221}	—	October 23, 2001	Socorro	LINEAR	·	960 m	MPC · JPL
370122	2001 UJ_{227}	—	October 16, 2001	Palomar	NEAT	(5)	1.1 km	MPC · JPL
370123	2001 VP_{2}	—	November 7, 2001	Socorro	LINEAR	·	1.9 km	MPC · JPL
370124	2001 VY_{45}	—	November 9, 2001	Socorro	LINEAR	(5)	1.2 km	MPC · JPL
370125	2001 VT_{73}	—	November 11, 2001	Socorro	LINEAR	·	1.8 km	MPC · JPL
370126	2001 VZ_{83}	—	November 11, 2001	Socorro	LINEAR	·	1.6 km	MPC · JPL
370127	2001 VU_{95}	—	November 15, 2001	Socorro	LINEAR	CYB	3.0 km	MPC · JPL
370128	2001 VL_{109}	—	November 12, 2001	Socorro	LINEAR	(5)	1.1 km	MPC · JPL
370129	2001 VZ_{111}	—	November 12, 2001	Socorro	LINEAR	·	1.4 km	MPC · JPL
370130	2001 VN_{118}	—	November 12, 2001	Socorro	LINEAR	(5)	2.1 km	MPC · JPL
370131	2001 VG_{124}	—	November 9, 2001	Socorro	LINEAR	·	1.2 km	MPC · JPL
370132	2001 VU_{127}	—	November 11, 2001	Apache Point	SDSS	·	700 m	MPC · JPL
370133	2001 VB_{132}	—	November 11, 2001	Apache Point	SDSS	MAR	830 m	MPC · JPL
370134	2001 WN_{19}	—	November 17, 2001	Socorro	LINEAR	·	1.1 km	MPC · JPL
370135	2001 WC_{30}	—	November 17, 2001	Socorro	LINEAR	·	1.0 km	MPC · JPL
370136	2001 WP_{35}	—	November 17, 2001	Socorro	LINEAR	·	1.7 km	MPC · JPL
370137	2001 WS_{57}	—	November 19, 2001	Socorro	LINEAR	·	1.6 km	MPC · JPL
370138	2001 WM_{72}	—	November 20, 2001	Socorro	LINEAR	(5)	830 m	MPC · JPL
370139	2001 WN_{81}	—	November 20, 2001	Socorro	LINEAR	·	1.3 km	MPC · JPL
370140	2001 WA_{101}	—	November 16, 2001	Kitt Peak	Spacewatch	·	1.5 km	MPC · JPL
370141	2001 XP_{13}	—	December 9, 2001	Socorro	LINEAR	·	1.9 km	MPC · JPL
370142	2001 XY_{44}	—	December 9, 2001	Socorro	LINEAR	·	1.7 km	MPC · JPL
370143	2001 XM_{78}	—	December 11, 2001	Socorro	LINEAR	·	1.8 km	MPC · JPL
370144	2001 XC_{93}	—	December 10, 2001	Socorro	LINEAR	·	1.1 km	MPC · JPL
370145	2001 XS_{93}	—	December 10, 2001	Socorro	LINEAR	·	1.7 km	MPC · JPL
370146	2001 XL_{95}	—	December 10, 2001	Socorro	LINEAR	(5)	1.4 km	MPC · JPL
370147	2001 XO_{112}	—	December 11, 2001	Socorro	LINEAR	ADE	2.8 km	MPC · JPL
370148	2001 XG_{150}	—	December 14, 2001	Socorro	LINEAR	·	1.4 km	MPC · JPL
370149	2001 XO_{151}	—	December 14, 2001	Socorro	LINEAR	·	1.2 km	MPC · JPL
370150	2001 XA_{174}	—	December 14, 2001	Socorro	LINEAR	(5)	1.4 km	MPC · JPL
370151	2001 XU_{214}	—	December 13, 2001	Socorro	LINEAR	·	1.6 km	MPC · JPL
370152	2001 XP_{231}	—	December 15, 2001	Socorro	LINEAR	·	1.6 km	MPC · JPL
370153	2001 XN_{239}	—	December 15, 2001	Socorro	LINEAR	·	1.8 km	MPC · JPL
370154	2001 XA_{259}	—	December 8, 2001	Anderson Mesa	LONEOS	·	970 m	MPC · JPL
370155	2001 XK_{266}	—	December 7, 2001	Kitt Peak	Spacewatch	·	1.4 km	MPC · JPL
370156	2001 YY_{11}	—	December 23, 2001	Socorro	LINEAR	·	1.8 km	MPC · JPL
370157	2001 YP_{71}	—	December 18, 2001	Socorro	LINEAR	·	1.7 km	MPC · JPL
370158	2001 YO_{85}	—	December 18, 2001	Socorro	LINEAR	·	1.4 km	MPC · JPL
370159	2001 YW_{126}	—	December 17, 2001	Socorro	LINEAR	·	1.1 km	MPC · JPL
370160	2001 YR_{127}	—	December 17, 2001	Socorro	LINEAR	·	1.1 km	MPC · JPL
370161	2001 YB_{133}	—	December 20, 2001	Socorro	LINEAR	·	1.8 km	MPC · JPL
370162	2001 YS_{149}	—	December 19, 2001	Palomar	NEAT	·	1.6 km	MPC · JPL
370163	2001 YC_{157}	—	December 20, 2001	Palomar	NEAT	·	2.2 km	MPC · JPL
370164	2002 AQ_{11}	—	January 4, 2002	Kitt Peak	Spacewatch	·	1.6 km	MPC · JPL
370165	2002 AY_{72}	—	January 8, 2002	Socorro	LINEAR	·	1.6 km	MPC · JPL
370166	2002 AM_{79}	—	December 19, 2001	Socorro	LINEAR	·	1.6 km	MPC · JPL
370167	2002 AJ_{99}	—	January 8, 2002	Socorro	LINEAR	·	1.3 km	MPC · JPL
370168	2002 AS_{105}	—	January 9, 2002	Socorro	LINEAR	·	1.8 km	MPC · JPL
370169	2002 AF_{133}	—	January 8, 2002	Socorro	LINEAR	·	1.1 km	MPC · JPL
370170	2002 AU_{136}	—	December 19, 2001	Kitt Peak	Spacewatch	·	2.0 km	MPC · JPL
370171	2002 AZ_{142}	—	January 13, 2002	Socorro	LINEAR	·	1.7 km	MPC · JPL
370172	2002 AP_{143}	—	January 13, 2002	Socorro	LINEAR	·	1.6 km	MPC · JPL
370173	2002 AD_{156}	—	January 14, 2002	Socorro	LINEAR	·	1.6 km	MPC · JPL
370174	2002 AG_{158}	—	January 13, 2002	Socorro	LINEAR	RAF	1.2 km	MPC · JPL
370175	2002 BW_{24}	—	January 23, 2002	Socorro	LINEAR	·	2.5 km	MPC · JPL
370176	2002 BD_{25}	—	January 23, 2002	Socorro	LINEAR	·	2.4 km	MPC · JPL
370177	2002 BC_{26}	—	January 26, 2002	Socorro	LINEAR	·	1.5 km	MPC · JPL
370178	2002 CO_{12}	—	February 4, 2002	Črni Vrh	Mikuž, H.	·	1.4 km	MPC · JPL
370179	2002 CZ_{28}	—	February 6, 2002	Socorro	LINEAR	EUN	1.6 km	MPC · JPL
370180	2002 CR_{34}	—	February 6, 2002	Socorro	LINEAR	·	1.6 km	MPC · JPL
370181	2002 CX_{46}	—	February 11, 2002	Socorro	LINEAR	·	1.5 km	MPC · JPL
370182	2002 CO_{60}	—	February 6, 2002	Socorro	LINEAR	·	1.3 km	MPC · JPL
370183	2002 CT_{61}	—	February 6, 2002	Socorro	LINEAR	JUN	1.6 km	MPC · JPL
370184	2002 CM_{82}	—	February 7, 2002	Socorro	LINEAR	·	2.2 km	MPC · JPL
370185	2002 CA_{110}	—	February 7, 2002	Socorro	LINEAR	·	3.2 km	MPC · JPL
370186	2002 CV_{116}	—	February 11, 2002	Eskridge	G. Hug	·	1.9 km	MPC · JPL
370187	2002 CC_{139}	—	February 8, 2002	Socorro	LINEAR	(5)	1.5 km	MPC · JPL
370188	2002 CM_{180}	—	February 10, 2002	Socorro	LINEAR	BRG	2.0 km	MPC · JPL
370189	2002 CO_{182}	—	February 10, 2002	Socorro	LINEAR	·	1.9 km	MPC · JPL
370190	2002 CO_{183}	—	February 10, 2002	Socorro	LINEAR	·	2.1 km	MPC · JPL
370191	2002 CE_{199}	—	February 10, 2002	Socorro	LINEAR	·	1.9 km	MPC · JPL
370192	2002 CA_{204}	—	February 10, 2002	Socorro	LINEAR	·	2.4 km	MPC · JPL
370193	2002 CY_{217}	—	February 10, 2002	Socorro	LINEAR	·	2.5 km	MPC · JPL
370194	2002 CQ_{220}	—	February 10, 2002	Socorro	LINEAR	·	2.0 km	MPC · JPL
370195	2002 CU_{231}	—	February 15, 2002	Cerro Tololo	Deep Lens Survey	·	1.6 km	MPC · JPL
370196	2002 CZ_{253}	—	February 4, 2002	Cima Ekar	ADAS	ADE	3.0 km	MPC · JPL
370197	2002 CT_{296}	—	February 10, 2002	Socorro	LINEAR	·	3.2 km	MPC · JPL
370198	2002 CL_{314}	—	February 12, 2002	Cima Ekar	ADAS	·	2.1 km	MPC · JPL
370199	2002 DG_{2}	—	February 20, 2002	Socorro	LINEAR	·	2.5 km	MPC · JPL
370200	2002 DB_{6}	—	February 16, 2002	Palomar	NEAT	·	2.7 km	MPC · JPL

== 370201–370300 ==
back to top

Designation			Discovery			Properties		Ref
Permanent	Provisional	Named after	Date	Site	Discoverer(s)	Category	Diam.	Ref
370201	2002 EU_{7}	—	March 11, 2002	Ondřejov	P. Kušnirák	·	2.3 km	MPC · JPL
370202	2002 EU_{23}	—	March 5, 2002	Kitt Peak	Spacewatch	·	2.0 km	MPC · JPL
370203	2002 EV_{36}	—	March 9, 2002	Kitt Peak	Spacewatch	·	1.7 km	MPC · JPL
370204	2002 EN_{64}	—	March 10, 2002	Kitt Peak	Spacewatch	·	2.6 km	MPC · JPL
370205	2002 EB_{122}	—	March 12, 2002	Palomar	NEAT	·	1.7 km	MPC · JPL
370206	2002 FN	—	March 16, 2002	Socorro	LINEAR	H	490 m	MPC · JPL
370207	2002 FL_{21}	—	March 19, 2002	Anderson Mesa	LONEOS	DOR	2.9 km	MPC · JPL
370208	2002 GV_{89}	—	April 8, 2002	Palomar	NEAT	·	680 m	MPC · JPL
370209	2002 GO_{103}	—	April 10, 2002	Socorro	LINEAR	·	1.1 km	MPC · JPL
370210	2002 GW_{118}	—	April 12, 2002	Palomar	NEAT	·	980 m	MPC · JPL
370211	2002 GO_{138}	—	April 12, 2002	Haleakala	NEAT	H	620 m	MPC · JPL
370212	2002 GG_{148}	—	April 14, 2002	Socorro	LINEAR	·	1.2 km	MPC · JPL
370213	2002 GR_{162}	—	April 14, 2002	Palomar	NEAT	·	820 m	MPC · JPL
370214	2002 GS_{177}	—	April 14, 2002	Palomar	White, M., M. Collins	·	3.7 km	MPC · JPL
370215	2002 JK_{17}	—	May 7, 2002	Palomar	NEAT	·	720 m	MPC · JPL
370216	2002 JA_{148}	—	May 13, 2002	Socorro	LINEAR	·	820 m	MPC · JPL
370217	2002 JB_{149}	—	May 1, 2002	Palomar	NEAT	·	700 m	MPC · JPL
370218	2002 LB_{25}	—	June 2, 2002	Palomar	NEAT	·	3.0 km	MPC · JPL
370219	2002 LS_{38}	—	June 6, 2002	Socorro	LINEAR	·	3.4 km	MPC · JPL
370220	2002 NE_{59}	—	July 14, 2002	Palomar	NEAT	·	930 m	MPC · JPL
370221	2002 NA_{62}	—	July 4, 2002	Palomar	NEAT	·	3.1 km	MPC · JPL
370222	2002 NH_{67}	—	July 15, 2002	Palomar	NEAT	·	3.6 km	MPC · JPL
370223	2002 NP_{69}	—	July 9, 2002	Palomar	NEAT	·	2.8 km	MPC · JPL
370224	2002 NF_{75}	—	July 14, 2002	Palomar	NEAT	·	2.7 km	MPC · JPL
370225	2002 OS_{1}	—	July 17, 2002	Socorro	LINEAR	·	3.5 km	MPC · JPL
370226	2002 OG_{20}	—	July 26, 2002	Palomar	NEAT	TIR	3.2 km	MPC · JPL
370227	2002 OC_{27}	—	July 22, 2002	Palomar	NEAT	EOS	2.4 km	MPC · JPL
370228	2002 PD_{36}	—	August 6, 2002	Palomar	NEAT	·	3.1 km	MPC · JPL
370229	2002 PA_{62}	—	August 8, 2002	Palomar	NEAT	·	1.4 km	MPC · JPL
370230	2002 PA_{64}	—	August 2, 2002	Campo Imperatore	CINEOS	·	3.0 km	MPC · JPL
370231	2002 PZ_{68}	—	August 13, 2002	Needville	J. Dellinger, L. Casady	·	2.3 km	MPC · JPL
370232	2002 PK_{87}	—	August 13, 2002	Palomar	NEAT	PHO	1.3 km	MPC · JPL
370233	2002 PY_{90}	—	August 13, 2002	Socorro	LINEAR	·	1.8 km	MPC · JPL
370234	2002 PN_{102}	—	August 12, 2002	Socorro	LINEAR	EOS	2.4 km	MPC · JPL
370235	2002 PV_{115}	—	August 13, 2002	Socorro	LINEAR	·	4.0 km	MPC · JPL
370236	2002 PQ_{122}	—	August 14, 2002	Anderson Mesa	LONEOS	·	890 m	MPC · JPL
370237	2002 PR_{129}	—	August 15, 2002	Palomar	NEAT	·	800 m	MPC · JPL
370238	2002 PW_{150}	—	August 6, 2002	Palomar	NEAT	NYS	1.1 km	MPC · JPL
370239	2002 PT_{155}	—	August 8, 2002	Palomar	S. F. Hönig	·	950 m	MPC · JPL
370240	2002 PP_{157}	—	August 8, 2002	Palomar	S. F. Hönig	MAS	710 m	MPC · JPL
370241	2002 PU_{163}	—	August 8, 2002	Palomar	S. F. Hönig	MAS	720 m	MPC · JPL
370242	2002 PY_{164}	—	August 8, 2002	Palomar	S. F. Hönig	MAS	730 m	MPC · JPL
370243	2002 PH_{167}	—	August 8, 2002	Palomar	NEAT	·	2.8 km	MPC · JPL
370244	2002 PL_{173}	—	August 8, 2002	Palomar	NEAT	·	4.2 km	MPC · JPL
370245	2002 PB_{174}	—	August 8, 2002	Palomar	NEAT	·	2.2 km	MPC · JPL
370246	2002 PL_{174}	—	August 7, 2002	Palomar	NEAT	NYS	740 m	MPC · JPL
370247	2002 PR_{174}	—	August 15, 2002	Palomar	NEAT	EMA	5.4 km	MPC · JPL
370248	2002 PT_{174}	—	August 15, 2002	Palomar	NEAT	·	3.1 km	MPC · JPL
370249	2002 PT_{175}	—	August 7, 2002	Palomar	NEAT	ERI	1.5 km	MPC · JPL
370250	2002 PD_{181}	—	August 15, 2002	Palomar	NEAT	·	1.9 km	MPC · JPL
370251	2002 PU_{181}	—	August 15, 2002	Palomar	NEAT	·	3.9 km	MPC · JPL
370252	2002 PN_{183}	—	August 11, 2002	Palomar	NEAT	·	860 m	MPC · JPL
370253	2002 PP_{183}	—	August 11, 2002	Palomar	NEAT	·	1.1 km	MPC · JPL
370254	2002 PM_{186}	—	August 11, 2002	Palomar	NEAT	·	2.4 km	MPC · JPL
370255	2002 PO_{186}	—	August 11, 2002	Palomar	NEAT	·	2.3 km	MPC · JPL
370256	2002 PT_{189}	—	August 8, 2002	Palomar	NEAT	NYS	800 m	MPC · JPL
370257	2002 PT_{192}	—	August 8, 2002	Palomar	NEAT	·	970 m	MPC · JPL
370258	2002 QA_{1}	—	August 16, 2002	Palomar	NEAT	·	860 m	MPC · JPL
370259	2002 QC_{2}	—	August 16, 2002	Palomar	NEAT	·	1.3 km	MPC · JPL
370260	2002 QO_{18}	—	August 26, 2002	Palomar	NEAT	MAS	730 m	MPC · JPL
370261	2002 QH_{22}	—	August 27, 2002	Palomar	NEAT	(5)	1.5 km	MPC · JPL
370262	2002 QR_{24}	—	August 29, 2002	Palomar	NEAT	T_{j} (2.96)	2.8 km	MPC · JPL
370263	2002 QJ_{29}	—	August 29, 2002	Palomar	NEAT	·	1.3 km	MPC · JPL
370264	2002 QQ_{32}	—	August 29, 2002	Palomar	NEAT	MAS	620 m	MPC · JPL
370265	2002 QF_{37}	—	August 30, 2002	Kitt Peak	Spacewatch	·	3.7 km	MPC · JPL
370266	2002 QX_{37}	—	August 30, 2002	Kitt Peak	Spacewatch	·	2.9 km	MPC · JPL
370267	2002 QV_{50}	—	August 29, 2002	Palomar	R. Matson	·	4.2 km	MPC · JPL
370268	2002 QA_{52}	—	August 18, 2002	Palomar	S. F. Hönig	NYS	1.1 km	MPC · JPL
370269	2002 QL_{54}	—	August 29, 2002	Palomar	S. F. Hönig	·	3.5 km	MPC · JPL
370270	2002 QU_{57}	—	August 29, 2002	Palomar	S. F. Hönig	·	3.3 km	MPC · JPL
370271	2002 QO_{58}	—	August 18, 2002	Palomar	S. F. Hönig	·	3.1 km	MPC · JPL
370272	2002 QJ_{59}	—	August 19, 2002	Palomar	NEAT	·	2.8 km	MPC · JPL
370273	2002 QU_{59}	—	August 26, 2002	Palomar	NEAT	·	3.3 km	MPC · JPL
370274	2002 QU_{60}	—	August 28, 2002	Palomar	NEAT	·	1.4 km	MPC · JPL
370275	2002 QM_{64}	—	August 18, 2002	Palomar	NEAT	·	1.1 km	MPC · JPL
370276	2002 QC_{70}	—	August 18, 2002	Palomar	NEAT	·	1.0 km	MPC · JPL
370277	2002 QL_{71}	—	August 28, 2002	Palomar	NEAT	·	2.4 km	MPC · JPL
370278	2002 QL_{74}	—	August 18, 2002	Palomar	NEAT	·	2.1 km	MPC · JPL
370279	2002 QK_{76}	—	August 26, 2002	Palomar	NEAT	·	1.8 km	MPC · JPL
370280	2002 QA_{83}	—	August 16, 2002	Palomar	NEAT	·	850 m	MPC · JPL
370281	2002 QZ_{88}	—	August 27, 2002	Palomar	NEAT	EOS	2.0 km	MPC · JPL
370282	2002 QP_{93}	—	August 18, 2002	Palomar	NEAT	·	3.5 km	MPC · JPL
370283	2002 QC_{94}	—	August 29, 2002	Palomar	NEAT	·	830 m	MPC · JPL
370284	2002 QG_{98}	—	August 18, 2002	Palomar	NEAT	·	700 m	MPC · JPL
370285	2002 QS_{102}	—	August 29, 2002	Palomar	NEAT	·	910 m	MPC · JPL
370286	2002 QG_{104}	—	August 26, 2002	Palomar	NEAT	·	2.9 km	MPC · JPL
370287	2002 QE_{107}	—	August 17, 2002	Palomar	NEAT	·	2.2 km	MPC · JPL
370288	2002 QS_{109}	—	August 17, 2002	Palomar	NEAT	·	930 m	MPC · JPL
370289	2002 QD_{121}	—	August 16, 2002	Palomar	NEAT	·	3.2 km	MPC · JPL
370290	2002 QW_{124}	—	August 26, 2002	Palomar	NEAT	·	2.0 km	MPC · JPL
370291	2002 QJ_{125}	—	August 16, 2002	Kitt Peak	Spacewatch	·	4.5 km	MPC · JPL
370292	2002 QZ_{126}	—	August 19, 2002	Palomar	NEAT	·	1.0 km	MPC · JPL
370293	2002 QT_{130}	—	August 30, 2002	Palomar	NEAT	·	2.5 km	MPC · JPL
370294	2002 QW_{134}	—	August 30, 2002	Palomar	NEAT	HYG	2.7 km	MPC · JPL
370295	2002 QB_{138}	—	August 17, 2002	Palomar	NEAT	·	760 m	MPC · JPL
370296	2002 QN_{139}	—	August 27, 2002	Palomar	NEAT	·	2.8 km	MPC · JPL
370297	2002 QR_{147}	—	September 24, 1995	Kitt Peak	Spacewatch	·	870 m	MPC · JPL
370298	2002 RG_{1}	—	September 2, 2002	Drebach	Payer, T.	H	630 m	MPC · JPL
370299	2002 RB_{5}	—	September 3, 2002	Powell	Powell	(895)	5.8 km	MPC · JPL
370300	2002 RK_{10}	—	September 4, 2002	Palomar	NEAT	·	1.1 km	MPC · JPL

== 370301–370400 ==
back to top

Designation			Discovery			Properties		Ref
Permanent	Provisional	Named after	Date	Site	Discoverer(s)	Category	Diam.	Ref
370301	2002 RT_{15}	—	September 4, 2002	Anderson Mesa	LONEOS	V	790 m	MPC · JPL
370302	2002 RU_{17}	—	September 4, 2002	Anderson Mesa	LONEOS	NYS	1.2 km	MPC · JPL
370303	2002 RM_{23}	—	September 4, 2002	Anderson Mesa	LONEOS	MAS	700 m	MPC · JPL
370304	2002 RL_{29}	—	September 3, 2002	Haleakala	NEAT	TIR	3.5 km	MPC · JPL
370305	2002 RH_{31}	—	August 16, 2002	Socorro	LINEAR	·	3.1 km	MPC · JPL
370306	2002 RV_{35}	—	September 5, 2002	Anderson Mesa	LONEOS	V	810 m	MPC · JPL
370307	2002 RH_{52}	—	September 5, 2002	Socorro	LINEAR	AMO · APO +1km	1.4 km	MPC · JPL
370308	2002 RY_{67}	—	September 3, 2002	Haleakala	NEAT	·	3.5 km	MPC · JPL
370309	2002 RC_{70}	—	September 4, 2002	Anderson Mesa	LONEOS	·	2.8 km	MPC · JPL
370310	2002 RD_{70}	—	September 4, 2002	Anderson Mesa	LONEOS	V	650 m	MPC · JPL
370311	2002 RB_{74}	—	September 5, 2002	Socorro	LINEAR	·	3.6 km	MPC · JPL
370312	2002 RL_{75}	—	September 5, 2002	Socorro	LINEAR	NYS	1.0 km	MPC · JPL
370313	2002 RR_{75}	—	September 5, 2002	Socorro	LINEAR	V	730 m	MPC · JPL
370314	2002 RU_{76}	—	September 5, 2002	Socorro	LINEAR	NYS	1.1 km	MPC · JPL
370315	2002 RP_{112}	—	September 6, 2002	Socorro	LINEAR	·	4.5 km	MPC · JPL
370316	2002 RE_{120}	—	September 3, 2002	Campo Imperatore	CINEOS	·	1.0 km	MPC · JPL
370317	2002 RS_{121}	—	September 7, 2002	Socorro	LINEAR	·	4.8 km	MPC · JPL
370318	2002 RJ_{129}	—	September 11, 2002	Palomar	NEAT	·	3.2 km	MPC · JPL
370319	2002 RG_{130}	—	September 11, 2002	Haleakala	NEAT	·	3.9 km	MPC · JPL
370320	2002 RL_{130}	—	September 10, 2002	Palomar	NEAT	·	3.5 km	MPC · JPL
370321	2002 RK_{131}	—	September 11, 2002	Palomar	NEAT	·	3.2 km	MPC · JPL
370322	2002 RD_{141}	—	September 10, 2002	Palomar	NEAT	·	2.8 km	MPC · JPL
370323	2002 RW_{143}	—	September 11, 2002	Palomar	NEAT	NYS	1.2 km	MPC · JPL
370324	2002 RB_{144}	—	September 11, 2002	Palomar	NEAT	·	2.6 km	MPC · JPL
370325	2002 RG_{148}	—	September 11, 2002	Palomar	NEAT	NYS	1.1 km	MPC · JPL
370326	2002 RU_{152}	—	September 12, 2002	Palomar	NEAT	V	710 m	MPC · JPL
370327	2002 RD_{155}	—	September 11, 2002	Palomar	NEAT	·	3.2 km	MPC · JPL
370328	2002 RR_{162}	—	September 12, 2002	Palomar	NEAT	·	830 m	MPC · JPL
370329	2002 RY_{163}	—	September 12, 2002	Palomar	NEAT	MAS	660 m	MPC · JPL
370330	2002 RV_{170}	—	September 13, 2002	Palomar	NEAT	·	1.0 km	MPC · JPL
370331	2002 RU_{191}	—	September 12, 2002	Palomar	NEAT	·	2.8 km	MPC · JPL
370332	2002 RN_{221}	—	September 15, 2002	Haleakala	NEAT	·	3.1 km	MPC · JPL
370333	2002 RC_{223}	—	September 15, 2002	Haleakala	NEAT	·	3.3 km	MPC · JPL
370334	2002 RZ_{230}	—	September 15, 2002	Haleakala	NEAT	LIX	4.0 km	MPC · JPL
370335	2002 RT_{237}	—	September 15, 2002	Palomar	R. Matson	·	1.2 km	MPC · JPL
370336	2002 RN_{240}	—	April 13, 2001	Kitt Peak	Spacewatch	·	3.0 km	MPC · JPL
370337	2002 RX_{247}	—	September 3, 2002	Palomar	NEAT	·	3.8 km	MPC · JPL
370338	2002 RW_{250}	—	September 12, 2002	Palomar	NEAT	EOS	2.2 km	MPC · JPL
370339	2002 RK_{251}	—	September 1, 2002	Palomar	NEAT	MAS	540 m	MPC · JPL
370340	2002 RZ_{255}	—	September 4, 2002	Palomar	NEAT	EOS	1.8 km	MPC · JPL
370341	2002 RK_{256}	—	September 15, 2002	Palomar	NEAT	·	1.0 km	MPC · JPL
370342	2002 RY_{258}	—	September 14, 2002	Palomar	NEAT	HYG	2.9 km	MPC · JPL
370343	2002 RH_{261}	—	September 11, 2002	Palomar	NEAT	ELF	3.6 km	MPC · JPL
370344	2002 RQ_{261}	—	September 13, 2002	Palomar	Palomar	·	5.2 km	MPC · JPL
370345	2002 RO_{262}	—	September 13, 2002	Palomar	NEAT	·	3.1 km	MPC · JPL
370346	2002 RS_{266}	—	September 13, 2002	Palomar	NEAT	EOS	2.0 km	MPC · JPL
370347	2002 RO_{267}	—	September 3, 2002	Palomar	NEAT	·	3.2 km	MPC · JPL
370348	2002 RX_{267}	—	September 14, 2002	Palomar	NEAT	·	3.9 km	MPC · JPL
370349	2002 RM_{269}	—	September 4, 2002	Palomar	NEAT	·	3.8 km	MPC · JPL
370350	2002 RU_{270}	—	September 4, 2002	Palomar	NEAT	·	3.6 km	MPC · JPL
370351	2002 RN_{274}	—	September 4, 2002	Palomar	NEAT	EOS	3.4 km	MPC · JPL
370352	2002 RH_{275}	—	September 4, 2002	Palomar	NEAT	·	2.5 km	MPC · JPL
370353	2002 RK_{277}	—	September 15, 2002	Palomar	NEAT	·	1.1 km	MPC · JPL
370354	2002 RN_{277}	—	September 15, 2002	Palomar	NEAT	MAS	570 m	MPC · JPL
370355	2002 RV_{278}	—	September 12, 2002	Palomar	NEAT	·	3.6 km	MPC · JPL
370356	2002 RZ_{281}	—	September 12, 2002	Palomar	NEAT	·	5.1 km	MPC · JPL
370357	2002 SU_{3}	—	September 26, 2002	Palomar	NEAT	·	4.1 km	MPC · JPL
370358	2002 SQ_{29}	—	September 28, 2002	Haleakala	NEAT	NYS	1.1 km	MPC · JPL
370359	2002 SO_{35}	—	September 29, 2002	Haleakala	NEAT	·	1.4 km	MPC · JPL
370360	2002 SF_{42}	—	September 28, 2002	Palomar	NEAT	·	4.1 km	MPC · JPL
370361	2002 SV_{55}	—	September 30, 2002	Socorro	LINEAR	·	1.3 km	MPC · JPL
370362	2002 SE_{62}	—	September 17, 2002	Palomar	NEAT	·	3.3 km	MPC · JPL
370363	2002 SQ_{63}	—	September 27, 2002	Palomar	NEAT	·	3.6 km	MPC · JPL
370364	2002 SX_{68}	—	September 26, 2002	Palomar	NEAT	·	910 m	MPC · JPL
370365	2002 SY_{70}	—	September 16, 2002	Palomar	NEAT	·	2.5 km	MPC · JPL
370366	2002 TF_{7}	—	October 1, 2002	Anderson Mesa	LONEOS	TIR	3.7 km	MPC · JPL
370367	2002 TV_{7}	—	October 1, 2002	Haleakala	NEAT	·	1.3 km	MPC · JPL
370368	2002 TE_{8}	—	October 1, 2002	Haleakala	NEAT	·	1.4 km	MPC · JPL
370369	2002 TS_{18}	—	October 2, 2002	Socorro	LINEAR	NYS	1.2 km	MPC · JPL
370370	2002 TX_{28}	—	October 2, 2002	Socorro	LINEAR	LIX	6.1 km	MPC · JPL
370371	2002 TB_{34}	—	October 2, 2002	Socorro	LINEAR	NYS	1.3 km	MPC · JPL
370372	2002 TQ_{42}	—	October 2, 2002	Socorro	LINEAR	TIR	3.2 km	MPC · JPL
370373	2002 TH_{47}	—	October 2, 2002	Socorro	LINEAR	·	1.9 km	MPC · JPL
370374	2002 TB_{49}	—	October 2, 2002	Socorro	LINEAR	·	1.5 km	MPC · JPL
370375	2002 TU_{74}	—	October 1, 2002	Anderson Mesa	LONEOS	·	3.1 km	MPC · JPL
370376	2002 TN_{84}	—	October 2, 2002	Haleakala	NEAT	·	3.9 km	MPC · JPL
370377	2002 TO_{93}	—	October 3, 2002	Socorro	LINEAR	·	3.8 km	MPC · JPL
370378	2002 TS_{94}	—	October 3, 2002	Socorro	LINEAR	·	3.0 km	MPC · JPL
370379	2002 TJ_{107}	—	October 4, 2002	Campo Imperatore	CINEOS	THM	2.9 km	MPC · JPL
370380	2002 TV_{120}	—	October 3, 2002	Palomar	NEAT	EUP	4.6 km	MPC · JPL
370381	2002 TH_{122}	—	October 3, 2002	Campo Imperatore	CINEOS	EUP	5.1 km	MPC · JPL
370382	2002 TW_{122}	—	October 4, 2002	Palomar	NEAT	EOS	2.7 km	MPC · JPL
370383	2002 TG_{123}	—	October 4, 2002	Palomar	NEAT	H	610 m	MPC · JPL
370384	2002 TV_{126}	—	October 4, 2002	Socorro	LINEAR	·	1.3 km	MPC · JPL
370385	2002 TE_{127}	—	October 4, 2002	Palomar	NEAT	·	3.0 km	MPC · JPL
370386	2002 TD_{131}	—	October 4, 2002	Socorro	LINEAR	·	1.4 km	MPC · JPL
370387	2002 TR_{132}	—	October 4, 2002	Socorro	LINEAR	·	1.4 km	MPC · JPL
370388	2002 TS_{136}	—	October 4, 2002	Anderson Mesa	LONEOS	·	3.5 km	MPC · JPL
370389	2002 TP_{145}	—	October 3, 2002	Campo Imperatore	CINEOS	URS	4.6 km	MPC · JPL
370390	2002 TD_{146}	—	October 4, 2002	Socorro	LINEAR	·	3.6 km	MPC · JPL
370391	2002 TC_{152}	—	October 5, 2002	Palomar	NEAT	·	3.9 km	MPC · JPL
370392	2002 TQ_{166}	—	October 3, 2002	Palomar	NEAT	·	4.3 km	MPC · JPL
370393	2002 TJ_{167}	—	October 3, 2002	Palomar	NEAT	·	3.2 km	MPC · JPL
370394	2002 TW_{169}	—	October 3, 2002	Palomar	NEAT	·	4.1 km	MPC · JPL
370395	2002 TL_{170}	—	October 3, 2002	Palomar	NEAT	TIR	3.0 km	MPC · JPL
370396	2002 TU_{170}	—	October 3, 2002	Palomar	NEAT	·	3.9 km	MPC · JPL
370397	2002 TQ_{175}	—	October 4, 2002	Anderson Mesa	LONEOS	·	4.5 km	MPC · JPL
370398	2002 TE_{176}	—	October 4, 2002	Anderson Mesa	LONEOS	LIX	4.2 km	MPC · JPL
370399	2002 TW_{178}	—	October 13, 2002	Palomar	NEAT	·	5.5 km	MPC · JPL
370400	2002 TZ_{193}	—	October 3, 2002	Socorro	LINEAR	·	2.4 km	MPC · JPL

== 370401–370500 ==
back to top

Designation			Discovery			Properties		Ref
Permanent	Provisional	Named after	Date	Site	Discoverer(s)	Category	Diam.	Ref
370401	2002 TW_{194}	—	October 3, 2002	Socorro	LINEAR	·	2.4 km	MPC · JPL
370402	2002 TL_{237}	—	October 6, 2002	Socorro	LINEAR	·	5.8 km	MPC · JPL
370403	2002 TZ_{248}	—	October 7, 2002	Socorro	LINEAR	(6769)	1.3 km	MPC · JPL
370404	2002 TM_{267}	—	October 8, 2002	Socorro	LINEAR	·	2.6 km	MPC · JPL
370405	2002 TL_{271}	—	October 9, 2002	Socorro	LINEAR	·	1.2 km	MPC · JPL
370406	2002 TD_{296}	—	September 5, 2002	Socorro	LINEAR	·	1.3 km	MPC · JPL
370407	2002 TU_{305}	—	October 4, 2002	Apache Point	SDSS	VER	2.7 km	MPC · JPL
370408	2002 TJ_{312}	—	October 4, 2002	Apache Point	SDSS	·	1.6 km	MPC · JPL
370409	2002 TW_{314}	—	October 4, 2002	Apache Point	SDSS	·	3.8 km	MPC · JPL
370410	2002 TH_{315}	—	October 4, 2002	Apache Point	SDSS	·	3.2 km	MPC · JPL
370411	2002 TY_{343}	—	October 5, 2002	Apache Point	SDSS	·	2.3 km	MPC · JPL
370412	2002 TR_{359}	—	October 10, 2002	Apache Point	SDSS	·	2.6 km	MPC · JPL
370413	2002 TU_{366}	—	October 10, 2002	Apache Point	SDSS	HYG	2.5 km	MPC · JPL
370414	2002 TN_{377}	—	October 15, 2002	Palomar	NEAT	·	1.6 km	MPC · JPL
370415	2002 TS_{377}	—	October 4, 2002	Palomar	NEAT	·	3.2 km	MPC · JPL
370416	2002 TY_{378}	—	October 5, 2002	Palomar	NEAT	·	3.3 km	MPC · JPL
370417	2002 TG_{381}	—	October 5, 2002	Palomar	NEAT	·	2.4 km	MPC · JPL
370418	2002 TQ_{381}	—	October 6, 2002	Palomar	NEAT	·	900 m	MPC · JPL
370419	2002 UH_{3}	—	October 28, 2002	Palomar	NEAT	·	3.4 km	MPC · JPL
370420	2002 UE_{12}	—	October 30, 2002	Socorro	LINEAR	·	6.1 km	MPC · JPL
370421	2002 UA_{25}	—	March 20, 2001	Kitt Peak	Spacewatch	NYS	1.6 km	MPC · JPL
370422	2002 UF_{30}	—	October 30, 2002	Kitt Peak	Spacewatch	NYS	1.2 km	MPC · JPL
370423	2002 UL_{35}	—	October 31, 2002	Palomar	NEAT	HYG	3.8 km	MPC · JPL
370424	2002 UP_{39}	—	October 31, 2002	Palomar	NEAT	·	3.7 km	MPC · JPL
370425	2002 UV_{59}	—	October 29, 2002	Apache Point	SDSS	·	1.6 km	MPC · JPL
370426	2002 UL_{71}	—	October 29, 2002	Palomar	NEAT	V	790 m	MPC · JPL
370427	2002 UJ_{72}	—	October 16, 2002	Palomar	NEAT	NYS	1.1 km	MPC · JPL
370428	2002 UC_{77}	—	October 30, 2002	Palomar	NEAT	V	720 m	MPC · JPL
370429	2002 UZ_{78}	—	October 29, 2002	Palomar	NEAT	V	740 m	MPC · JPL
370430	2002 VE_{4}	—	November 2, 2002	Haleakala	NEAT	·	3.1 km	MPC · JPL
370431	2002 VZ_{18}	—	November 4, 2002	Palomar	NEAT	·	1.5 km	MPC · JPL
370432	2002 VH_{51}	—	November 6, 2002	Anderson Mesa	LONEOS	·	4.8 km	MPC · JPL
370433	2002 VP_{59}	—	November 3, 2002	Haleakala	NEAT	·	2.7 km	MPC · JPL
370434	2002 VN_{64}	—	November 6, 2002	Haleakala	NEAT	·	4.9 km	MPC · JPL
370435	2002 VW_{69}	—	November 7, 2002	Socorro	LINEAR	·	4.5 km	MPC · JPL
370436	2002 VF_{86}	—	November 8, 2002	Socorro	LINEAR	H	680 m	MPC · JPL
370437	2002 VK_{92}	—	October 6, 2002	Socorro	LINEAR	·	1.7 km	MPC · JPL
370438	2002 VF_{97}	—	November 12, 2002	Socorro	LINEAR	·	1.6 km	MPC · JPL
370439	2002 VM_{100}	—	November 11, 2002	Anderson Mesa	LONEOS	·	1.6 km	MPC · JPL
370440	2002 VQ_{102}	—	October 31, 2002	Anderson Mesa	LONEOS	·	1.8 km	MPC · JPL
370441	2002 VH_{112}	—	November 13, 2002	Socorro	LINEAR	·	2.2 km	MPC · JPL
370442	2002 VV_{133}	—	November 6, 2002	Anderson Mesa	LONEOS	·	3.5 km	MPC · JPL
370443	2002 WB_{8}	—	November 24, 2002	Palomar	NEAT	·	1.2 km	MPC · JPL
370444	2002 WF_{14}	—	November 28, 2002	Anderson Mesa	LONEOS	·	1.4 km	MPC · JPL
370445	2002 WM_{21}	—	November 16, 2002	Palomar	NEAT	PHO	1.0 km	MPC · JPL
370446	2002 WC_{22}	—	November 16, 2002	Palomar	NEAT	THM	2.5 km	MPC · JPL
370447	2002 WA_{24}	—	November 16, 2002	Palomar	NEAT	·	3.0 km	MPC · JPL
370448	2002 WB_{24}	—	November 16, 2002	Palomar	NEAT	THM	2.6 km	MPC · JPL
370449	2002 XY_{12}	—	December 3, 2002	Haleakala	NEAT	NYS	1.2 km	MPC · JPL
370450	2002 XT_{15}	—	December 3, 2002	Palomar	NEAT	·	4.5 km	MPC · JPL
370451	2002 XX_{22}	—	December 3, 2002	Palomar	NEAT	·	1.4 km	MPC · JPL
370452	2002 XC_{109}	—	December 6, 2002	Socorro	LINEAR	TIR	3.7 km	MPC · JPL
370453	2002 XF_{121}	—	May 29, 2000	Kitt Peak	Spacewatch	·	4.5 km	MPC · JPL
370454	2002 YM_{20}	—	December 31, 2002	Socorro	LINEAR	·	1.4 km	MPC · JPL
370455	2002 YS_{36}	—	December 27, 2002	Palomar	NEAT	·	1.1 km	MPC · JPL
370456	2003 AV_{11}	—	January 1, 2003	Socorro	LINEAR	·	1.8 km	MPC · JPL
370457	2003 AZ_{21}	—	January 5, 2003	Socorro	LINEAR	NYS	1.5 km	MPC · JPL
370458	2003 AV_{39}	—	January 7, 2003	Socorro	LINEAR	·	1.5 km	MPC · JPL
370459	2003 AV_{41}	—	January 7, 2003	Socorro	LINEAR	·	2.2 km	MPC · JPL
370460	2003 AA_{57}	—	January 5, 2003	Socorro	LINEAR	·	1.2 km	MPC · JPL
370461	2003 BR	—	January 24, 2003	Palomar	NEAT	·	2.9 km	MPC · JPL
370462	2003 BJ_{26}	—	January 26, 2003	Palomar	NEAT	·	2.0 km	MPC · JPL
370463	2003 BZ_{60}	—	January 27, 2003	Palomar	NEAT	·	1.8 km	MPC · JPL
370464	2003 BC_{66}	—	January 30, 2003	Kitt Peak	Spacewatch	·	1.1 km	MPC · JPL
370465	2003 BG_{75}	—	January 29, 2003	Palomar	NEAT	·	2.0 km	MPC · JPL
370466	2003 DE_{4}	—	February 19, 2003	Palomar	NEAT	·	1.7 km	MPC · JPL
370467	2003 ES_{34}	—	March 7, 2003	Socorro	LINEAR	·	2.1 km	MPC · JPL
370468	2003 EX_{46}	—	March 8, 2003	Kitt Peak	Spacewatch	·	2.1 km	MPC · JPL
370469	2003 EJ_{63}	—	March 11, 2003	Palomar	NEAT	EUN	1.3 km	MPC · JPL
370470	2003 FH_{4}	—	March 24, 2003	Socorro	LINEAR	BAR	1.3 km	MPC · JPL
370471	2003 FV_{33}	—	March 23, 2003	Kitt Peak	Spacewatch	·	1.5 km	MPC · JPL
370472	2003 FE_{35}	—	March 23, 2003	Kitt Peak	Spacewatch	·	1.5 km	MPC · JPL
370473	2003 FQ_{90}	—	March 29, 2003	Anderson Mesa	LONEOS	JUN	1.5 km	MPC · JPL
370474	2003 FE_{100}	—	March 31, 2003	Anderson Mesa	LONEOS	·	1.8 km	MPC · JPL
370475	2003 FF_{110}	—	March 30, 2003	Kitt Peak	Spacewatch	·	1.6 km	MPC · JPL
370476	2003 FM_{116}	—	March 23, 2003	Kitt Peak	Spacewatch	·	1.5 km	MPC · JPL
370477	2003 GO_{45}	—	April 8, 2003	Palomar	NEAT	MIS	2.9 km	MPC · JPL
370478	2003 HQ_{8}	—	April 25, 2003	Anderson Mesa	LONEOS	·	2.1 km	MPC · JPL
370479	2003 HA_{46}	—	April 27, 2003	Anderson Mesa	LONEOS	·	2.7 km	MPC · JPL
370480	2003 KY_{30}	—	May 26, 2003	Kitt Peak	Spacewatch	·	1.9 km	MPC · JPL
370481	2003 NQ_{1}	—	July 2, 2003	Socorro	LINEAR	·	2.4 km	MPC · JPL
370482	2003 QA_{27}	—	August 22, 2003	Campo Imperatore	CINEOS	·	690 m	MPC · JPL
370483	2003 QS_{38}	—	August 22, 2003	Palomar	NEAT	·	2.4 km	MPC · JPL
370484	2003 QX_{39}	—	August 22, 2003	Socorro	LINEAR	·	840 m	MPC · JPL
370485	2003 QQ_{67}	—	August 24, 2003	Socorro	LINEAR	·	730 m	MPC · JPL
370486	2003 QD_{73}	—	August 24, 2003	Socorro	LINEAR	·	920 m	MPC · JPL
370487	2003 QW_{95}	—	August 30, 2003	Kitt Peak	Spacewatch	KOR	1.4 km	MPC · JPL
370488	2003 RD_{16}	—	September 15, 2003	Palomar	NEAT	·	720 m	MPC · JPL
370489	2003 RN_{20}	—	September 15, 2003	Anderson Mesa	LONEOS	·	2.6 km	MPC · JPL
370490	2003 RR_{20}	—	September 18, 2003	Socorro	LINEAR	·	790 m	MPC · JPL
370491	2003 SE	—	September 16, 2003	Kitt Peak	Spacewatch	·	840 m	MPC · JPL
370492	2003 SP_{15}	—	September 16, 2003	Kitt Peak	Spacewatch	·	2.0 km	MPC · JPL
370493	2003 SR_{25}	—	September 17, 2003	Kitt Peak	Spacewatch	·	2.2 km	MPC · JPL
370494	2003 SC_{26}	—	September 17, 2003	Haleakala	NEAT	·	3.5 km	MPC · JPL
370495	2003 SR_{27}	—	September 18, 2003	Palomar	NEAT	·	920 m	MPC · JPL
370496	2003 SU_{28}	—	September 18, 2003	Palomar	NEAT	EOS	2.6 km	MPC · JPL
370497	2003 SJ_{34}	—	September 18, 2003	Kitt Peak	Spacewatch	·	1.7 km	MPC · JPL
370498	2003 SD_{36}	—	September 18, 2003	Socorro	LINEAR	·	3.7 km	MPC · JPL
370499	2003 SC_{55}	—	September 16, 2003	Anderson Mesa	LONEOS	·	850 m	MPC · JPL
370500	2003 SA_{61}	—	September 17, 2003	Socorro	LINEAR	·	730 m	MPC · JPL

== 370501–370600 ==
back to top

Designation			Discovery			Properties		Ref
Permanent	Provisional	Named after	Date	Site	Discoverer(s)	Category	Diam.	Ref
370501	2003 SE_{73}	—	September 18, 2003	Kitt Peak	Spacewatch	BRA	2.0 km	MPC · JPL
370502	2003 SO_{73}	—	September 18, 2003	Kitt Peak	Spacewatch	·	1.5 km	MPC · JPL
370503	2003 SC_{75}	—	September 18, 2003	Kitt Peak	Spacewatch	·	660 m	MPC · JPL
370504	2003 SM_{88}	—	September 18, 2003	Campo Imperatore	CINEOS	·	870 m	MPC · JPL
370505	2003 ST_{93}	—	September 18, 2003	Kitt Peak	Spacewatch	·	780 m	MPC · JPL
370506	2003 SL_{107}	—	September 20, 2003	Palomar	NEAT	·	830 m	MPC · JPL
370507	2003 SS_{128}	—	September 20, 2003	Kitt Peak	Spacewatch	·	860 m	MPC · JPL
370508	2003 SU_{158}	—	September 19, 2003	Socorro	LINEAR	·	4.2 km	MPC · JPL
370509	2003 SY_{160}	—	September 17, 2003	Kitt Peak	Spacewatch	·	610 m	MPC · JPL
370510	2003 SL_{163}	—	September 19, 2003	Kitt Peak	Spacewatch	H	580 m	MPC · JPL
370511	2003 SA_{187}	—	September 22, 2003	Anderson Mesa	LONEOS	·	850 m	MPC · JPL
370512	2003 SP_{193}	—	September 20, 2003	Socorro	LINEAR	·	2.2 km	MPC · JPL
370513	2003 SE_{197}	—	September 20, 2003	Socorro	LINEAR	·	660 m	MPC · JPL
370514	2003 SK_{208}	—	September 3, 2003	Socorro	LINEAR	·	670 m	MPC · JPL
370515	2003 SK_{222}	—	September 27, 2003	Desert Eagle	W. K. Y. Yeung	·	730 m	MPC · JPL
370516	2003 SG_{225}	—	September 26, 2003	Socorro	LINEAR	·	2.1 km	MPC · JPL
370517	2003 SJ_{240}	—	September 27, 2003	Kitt Peak	Spacewatch	·	510 m	MPC · JPL
370518	2003 SN_{253}	—	September 27, 2003	Socorro	LINEAR	·	1.9 km	MPC · JPL
370519	2003 SN_{264}	—	September 28, 2003	Socorro	LINEAR	·	750 m	MPC · JPL
370520	2003 SF_{273}	—	September 27, 2003	Socorro	LINEAR	EOS	2.1 km	MPC · JPL
370521	2003 SL_{281}	—	September 19, 2003	Kitt Peak	Spacewatch	·	3.3 km	MPC · JPL
370522	2003 SN_{283}	—	September 20, 2003	Socorro	LINEAR	·	2.9 km	MPC · JPL
370523	2003 SH_{295}	—	September 29, 2003	Anderson Mesa	LONEOS	BRA	1.5 km	MPC · JPL
370524	2003 SM_{295}	—	September 29, 2003	Anderson Mesa	LONEOS	·	2.3 km	MPC · JPL
370525	2003 SO_{306}	—	September 30, 2003	Socorro	LINEAR	·	3.4 km	MPC · JPL
370526	2003 SR_{306}	—	September 30, 2003	Socorro	LINEAR	·	4.3 km	MPC · JPL
370527	2003 SD_{320}	—	September 16, 2003	Kitt Peak	Spacewatch	·	630 m	MPC · JPL
370528	2003 SP_{320}	—	September 17, 2003	Palomar	NEAT	·	800 m	MPC · JPL
370529	2003 SK_{321}	—	September 20, 2003	Palomar	NEAT	·	2.2 km	MPC · JPL
370530	2003 SL_{321}	—	September 20, 2003	Kitt Peak	Spacewatch	·	2.5 km	MPC · JPL
370531	2003 SN_{326}	—	September 18, 2003	Kitt Peak	Spacewatch	·	1.7 km	MPC · JPL
370532	2003 SS_{335}	—	September 26, 2003	Apache Point	SDSS	·	890 m	MPC · JPL
370533	2003 SD_{338}	—	September 26, 2003	Apache Point	SDSS	·	1.7 km	MPC · JPL
370534	2003 SA_{339}	—	September 26, 2003	Apache Point	SDSS	·	2.4 km	MPC · JPL
370535	2003 SJ_{372}	—	September 26, 2003	Apache Point	SDSS	·	580 m	MPC · JPL
370536	2003 SV_{395}	—	September 26, 2003	Apache Point	SDSS	EOS	1.7 km	MPC · JPL
370537	2003 SQ_{406}	—	January 16, 2000	Kitt Peak	Spacewatch	·	2.5 km	MPC · JPL
370538	2003 SD_{410}	—	September 28, 2003	Apache Point	SDSS	·	710 m	MPC · JPL
370539	2003 SK_{422}	—	September 26, 2003	Apache Point	SDSS	·	770 m	MPC · JPL
370540	2003 SG_{429}	—	September 20, 2003	Kitt Peak	Spacewatch	·	4.2 km	MPC · JPL
370541	2003 SJ_{430}	—	September 30, 2003	Kitt Peak	Spacewatch	·	1.5 km	MPC · JPL
370542	2003 SH_{432}	—	September 18, 2003	Kitt Peak	Spacewatch	EOS	1.5 km	MPC · JPL
370543	2003 TU_{1}	—	October 3, 2003	Kitt Peak	Spacewatch	·	3.9 km	MPC · JPL
370544	2003 TA_{15}	—	October 15, 2003	Anderson Mesa	LONEOS	·	800 m	MPC · JPL
370545	2003 TF_{15}	—	September 19, 2003	Anderson Mesa	LONEOS	·	930 m	MPC · JPL
370546	2003 TO_{17}	—	October 15, 2003	Anderson Mesa	LONEOS	(2076)	710 m	MPC · JPL
370547	2003 TZ_{18}	—	October 15, 2003	Anderson Mesa	LONEOS	·	4.9 km	MPC · JPL
370548	2003 TV_{23}	—	October 1, 2003	Kitt Peak	Spacewatch	·	660 m	MPC · JPL
370549	2003 TU_{26}	—	October 1, 2003	Kitt Peak	Spacewatch	·	3.0 km	MPC · JPL
370550	2003 UA_{12}	—	October 19, 2003	Kitt Peak	Spacewatch	·	770 m	MPC · JPL
370551	2003 UP_{15}	—	October 16, 2003	Anderson Mesa	LONEOS	·	1 km	MPC · JPL
370552	2003 UA_{23}	—	October 20, 2003	Kitt Peak	Spacewatch	·	1.7 km	MPC · JPL
370553	2003 UD_{24}	—	October 23, 2003	Junk Bond	Junk Bond	(2076)	980 m	MPC · JPL
370554	2003 UJ_{60}	—	October 17, 2003	Anderson Mesa	LONEOS	·	3.9 km	MPC · JPL
370555	2003 UE_{67}	—	October 16, 2003	Kitt Peak	Spacewatch	·	3.0 km	MPC · JPL
370556	2003 UV_{69}	—	October 18, 2003	Kitt Peak	Spacewatch	KOR	1.3 km	MPC · JPL
370557	2003 UE_{83}	—	October 16, 2003	Anderson Mesa	LONEOS	·	2.4 km	MPC · JPL
370558	2003 UU_{111}	—	October 20, 2003	Palomar	NEAT	·	760 m	MPC · JPL
370559	2003 UF_{120}	—	October 18, 2003	Kitt Peak	Spacewatch	·	2.0 km	MPC · JPL
370560	2003 UL_{136}	—	October 21, 2003	Socorro	LINEAR	·	710 m	MPC · JPL
370561	2003 UB_{151}	—	October 21, 2003	Kitt Peak	Spacewatch	EOS	2.3 km	MPC · JPL
370562	2003 UE_{168}	—	October 22, 2003	Socorro	LINEAR	·	1.8 km	MPC · JPL
370563	2003 UM_{175}	—	October 21, 2003	Anderson Mesa	LONEOS	·	2.4 km	MPC · JPL
370564	2003 UE_{180}	—	October 21, 2003	Socorro	LINEAR	·	750 m	MPC · JPL
370565	2003 UD_{186}	—	October 22, 2003	Socorro	LINEAR	·	940 m	MPC · JPL
370566	2003 UM_{186}	—	October 22, 2003	Socorro	LINEAR	·	860 m	MPC · JPL
370567	2003 UJ_{187}	—	October 22, 2003	Socorro	LINEAR	·	2.0 km	MPC · JPL
370568	2003 UV_{191}	—	October 23, 2003	Anderson Mesa	LONEOS	·	1.0 km	MPC · JPL
370569	2003 UP_{195}	—	October 20, 2003	Kitt Peak	Spacewatch	·	1.8 km	MPC · JPL
370570	2003 UQ_{201}	—	October 21, 2003	Socorro	LINEAR	·	1.7 km	MPC · JPL
370571	2003 UV_{212}	—	October 23, 2003	Haleakala	NEAT	·	940 m	MPC · JPL
370572	2003 US_{214}	—	October 21, 2003	Anderson Mesa	LONEOS	·	740 m	MPC · JPL
370573	2003 UL_{225}	—	October 22, 2003	Kitt Peak	Spacewatch	EOS	2.5 km	MPC · JPL
370574	2003 UA_{246}	—	October 24, 2003	Socorro	LINEAR	·	780 m	MPC · JPL
370575	2003 UR_{254}	—	October 24, 2003	Kitt Peak	Spacewatch	·	5.0 km	MPC · JPL
370576	2003 UL_{269}	—	October 29, 2003	Socorro	LINEAR	·	2.7 km	MPC · JPL
370577	2003 UG_{270}	—	October 22, 2003	Anderson Mesa	LONEOS	·	1.4 km	MPC · JPL
370578	2003 UD_{285}	—	October 16, 2003	Kitt Peak	Spacewatch	·	2.6 km	MPC · JPL
370579	2003 UP_{305}	—	October 18, 2003	Kitt Peak	Spacewatch	·	2.6 km	MPC · JPL
370580	2003 UE_{309}	—	October 19, 2003	Kitt Peak	Spacewatch	·	2.4 km	MPC · JPL
370581	2003 UG_{317}	—	October 19, 2003	Apache Point	SDSS	·	1.6 km	MPC · JPL
370582	2003 UW_{317}	—	October 18, 2003	Apache Point	SDSS	·	2.3 km	MPC · JPL
370583	2003 UZ_{338}	—	September 21, 2003	Kitt Peak	Spacewatch	·	1.6 km	MPC · JPL
370584	2003 UD_{363}	—	October 20, 2003	Kitt Peak	Spacewatch	EOS	2.0 km	MPC · JPL
370585	2003 UT_{376}	—	October 22, 2003	Apache Point	SDSS	KOR	1.4 km	MPC · JPL
370586	2003 WD_{14}	—	November 16, 2003	Kitt Peak	Spacewatch	·	1.4 km	MPC · JPL
370587	2003 WN_{18}	—	November 19, 2003	Socorro	LINEAR	·	2.0 km	MPC · JPL
370588	2003 WL_{29}	—	November 18, 2003	Kitt Peak	Spacewatch	EOS	2.1 km	MPC · JPL
370589	2003 WX_{29}	—	November 18, 2003	Kitt Peak	Spacewatch	EOS	2.3 km	MPC · JPL
370590	2003 WJ_{31}	—	November 18, 2003	Palomar	NEAT	·	880 m	MPC · JPL
370591	2003 WY_{33}	—	November 19, 2003	Kitt Peak	Spacewatch	·	2.3 km	MPC · JPL
370592	2003 WN_{35}	—	November 19, 2003	Socorro	LINEAR	EOS	2.5 km	MPC · JPL
370593	2003 WO_{35}	—	November 19, 2003	Socorro	LINEAR	·	2.0 km	MPC · JPL
370594	2003 WL_{37}	—	November 19, 2003	Socorro	LINEAR	·	830 m	MPC · JPL
370595	2003 WZ_{54}	—	November 20, 2003	Socorro	LINEAR	EOS	2.5 km	MPC · JPL
370596	2003 WC_{68}	—	November 19, 2003	Kitt Peak	Spacewatch	·	4.2 km	MPC · JPL
370597	2003 WN_{68}	—	November 19, 2003	Kitt Peak	Spacewatch	·	1.8 km	MPC · JPL
370598	2003 WY_{85}	—	November 20, 2003	Kitt Peak	Spacewatch	·	930 m	MPC · JPL
370599	2003 WS_{95}	—	November 21, 2003	Socorro	LINEAR	·	860 m	MPC · JPL
370600	2003 WD_{100}	—	November 20, 2003	Socorro	LINEAR	·	950 m	MPC · JPL

== 370601–370700 ==
back to top

Designation			Discovery			Properties		Ref
Permanent	Provisional	Named after	Date	Site	Discoverer(s)	Category	Diam.	Ref
370601	2003 WB_{120}	—	November 20, 2003	Socorro	LINEAR	·	860 m	MPC · JPL
370602	2003 WK_{132}	—	November 19, 2003	Kitt Peak	Spacewatch	·	630 m	MPC · JPL
370603	2003 WT_{136}	—	November 21, 2003	Socorro	LINEAR	·	6.5 km	MPC · JPL
370604	2003 WC_{155}	—	November 26, 2003	Kitt Peak	Spacewatch	EOS	2.5 km	MPC · JPL
370605	2003 WE_{161}	—	November 30, 2003	Kitt Peak	Spacewatch	·	2.4 km	MPC · JPL
370606	2003 WT_{161}	—	November 30, 2003	Socorro	LINEAR	·	3.6 km	MPC · JPL
370607	2003 WR_{162}	—	November 30, 2003	Kitt Peak	Spacewatch	·	3.1 km	MPC · JPL
370608	2003 WE_{182}	—	November 22, 2003	Kitt Peak	M. W. Buie	·	530 m	MPC · JPL
370609	2003 WE_{189}	—	November 19, 2003	Palomar	NEAT	·	2.5 km	MPC · JPL
370610	2003 XR_{16}	—	December 14, 2003	Palomar	NEAT	·	3.9 km	MPC · JPL
370611	2003 XW_{20}	—	December 14, 2003	Kitt Peak	Spacewatch	·	730 m	MPC · JPL
370612	2003 YR_{3}	—	December 18, 2003	Socorro	LINEAR	H	640 m	MPC · JPL
370613	2003 YP_{4}	—	December 16, 2003	Socorro	LINEAR	·	6.0 km	MPC · JPL
370614	2003 YX_{5}	—	December 16, 2003	Anderson Mesa	LONEOS	·	4.4 km	MPC · JPL
370615	2003 YK_{12}	—	December 17, 2003	Socorro	LINEAR	·	4.0 km	MPC · JPL
370616	2003 YO_{16}	—	December 17, 2003	Kitt Peak	Spacewatch	·	4.5 km	MPC · JPL
370617	2003 YL_{19}	—	November 26, 2003	Kitt Peak	Spacewatch	·	3.0 km	MPC · JPL
370618	2003 YS_{20}	—	December 17, 2003	Kitt Peak	Spacewatch	HYG	4.1 km	MPC · JPL
370619	2003 YU_{22}	—	December 18, 2003	Kitt Peak	Spacewatch	·	2.8 km	MPC · JPL
370620	2003 YR_{27}	—	December 17, 2003	Kitt Peak	Spacewatch	·	800 m	MPC · JPL
370621	2003 YF_{28}	—	December 17, 2003	Palomar	NEAT	·	1.9 km	MPC · JPL
370622	2003 YC_{40}	—	December 19, 2003	Kitt Peak	Spacewatch	·	1.3 km	MPC · JPL
370623	2003 YN_{48}	—	December 18, 2003	Socorro	LINEAR	·	860 m	MPC · JPL
370624	2003 YK_{52}	—	December 18, 2003	Haleakala	NEAT	THB	4.7 km	MPC · JPL
370625	2003 YA_{53}	—	December 19, 2003	Socorro	LINEAR	·	860 m	MPC · JPL
370626	2003 YS_{55}	—	December 19, 2003	Socorro	LINEAR	EOS	3.3 km	MPC · JPL
370627	2003 YY_{56}	—	December 19, 2003	Socorro	LINEAR	·	4.1 km	MPC · JPL
370628	2003 YB_{75}	—	December 18, 2003	Socorro	LINEAR	·	2.4 km	MPC · JPL
370629	2003 YL_{107}	—	December 23, 2003	Socorro	LINEAR	·	1.3 km	MPC · JPL
370630	2003 YM_{115}	—	December 27, 2003	Socorro	LINEAR	H	680 m	MPC · JPL
370631	2003 YK_{117}	—	November 24, 2003	Socorro	LINEAR	H	690 m	MPC · JPL
370632	2003 YK_{119}	—	December 27, 2003	Socorro	LINEAR	·	900 m	MPC · JPL
370633	2003 YK_{123}	—	December 27, 2003	Socorro	LINEAR	·	710 m	MPC · JPL
370634	2003 YH_{128}	—	December 27, 2003	Socorro	LINEAR	LIX	4.7 km	MPC · JPL
370635	2003 YX_{146}	—	December 28, 2003	Kitt Peak	Spacewatch	·	3.0 km	MPC · JPL
370636	2003 YA_{156}	—	December 19, 2003	Catalina	CSS	·	3.3 km	MPC · JPL
370637	2003 YV_{157}	—	December 17, 2003	Kitt Peak	Spacewatch	(2076)	740 m	MPC · JPL
370638	2003 YE_{166}	—	December 17, 2003	Kitt Peak	Spacewatch	·	4.1 km	MPC · JPL
370639	2003 YR_{174}	—	December 19, 2003	Socorro	LINEAR	·	1.1 km	MPC · JPL
370640	2003 YR_{176}	—	November 24, 2003	Kitt Peak	Spacewatch	·	3.8 km	MPC · JPL
370641	2004 AO_{17}	—	January 15, 2004	Kitt Peak	Spacewatch	·	1.1 km	MPC · JPL
370642	2004 BV_{17}	—	January 18, 2004	Catalina	CSS	·	1.6 km	MPC · JPL
370643	2004 BJ_{26}	—	January 16, 2004	Kitt Peak	Spacewatch	·	740 m	MPC · JPL
370644	2004 BE_{31}	—	January 18, 2004	Palomar	NEAT	·	2.8 km	MPC · JPL
370645	2004 BB_{41}	—	January 21, 2004	Socorro	LINEAR	·	2.7 km	MPC · JPL
370646	2004 BZ_{51}	—	January 21, 2004	Socorro	LINEAR	·	1.1 km	MPC · JPL
370647	2004 BP_{55}	—	January 22, 2004	Socorro	LINEAR	·	1.9 km	MPC · JPL
370648	2004 BQ_{68}	—	January 27, 2004	Socorro	LINEAR	H	650 m	MPC · JPL
370649	2004 BM_{70}	—	January 22, 2004	Socorro	LINEAR	·	3.4 km	MPC · JPL
370650	2004 BP_{77}	—	January 22, 2004	Socorro	LINEAR	·	870 m	MPC · JPL
370651	2004 BX_{102}	—	January 29, 2004	Socorro	LINEAR	·	1.6 km	MPC · JPL
370652	2004 BF_{112}	—	January 24, 2004	Socorro	LINEAR	·	870 m	MPC · JPL
370653	2004 BK_{136}	—	January 19, 2004	Kitt Peak	Spacewatch	·	1.3 km	MPC · JPL
370654	2004 BH_{149}	—	January 16, 2004	Kitt Peak	Spacewatch	·	4.7 km	MPC · JPL
370655	2004 CD_{8}	—	February 10, 2004	Nogales	Tenagra II	·	980 m	MPC · JPL
370656	2004 CQ_{28}	—	February 12, 2004	Kitt Peak	Spacewatch	NYS	1.1 km	MPC · JPL
370657	2004 CQ_{37}	—	February 13, 2004	Desert Eagle	W. K. Y. Yeung	·	1.5 km	MPC · JPL
370658	2004 CC_{50}	—	February 11, 2004	Palomar	NEAT	EUP	4.0 km	MPC · JPL
370659	2004 CL_{50}	—	February 13, 2004	Palomar	NEAT	H	710 m	MPC · JPL
370660	2004 CV_{51}	—	February 12, 2004	Palomar	NEAT	H	730 m	MPC · JPL
370661	2004 CA_{61}	—	February 11, 2004	Kitt Peak	Spacewatch	·	1.4 km	MPC · JPL
370662	2004 CA_{81}	—	February 11, 2004	Palomar	NEAT	EUP	6.3 km	MPC · JPL
370663	2004 CV_{83}	—	February 12, 2004	Kitt Peak	Spacewatch	·	1.4 km	MPC · JPL
370664	2004 CB_{97}	—	February 13, 2004	Palomar	NEAT	LIX	4.5 km	MPC · JPL
370665	2004 CH_{102}	—	February 12, 2004	Palomar	NEAT	·	2.6 km	MPC · JPL
370666	2004 CA_{111}	—	February 15, 2004	Socorro	LINEAR	TIR	3.3 km	MPC · JPL
370667	2004 CO_{112}	—	February 13, 2004	Anderson Mesa	LONEOS	(3025)	4.9 km	MPC · JPL
370668	2004 CF_{115}	—	February 13, 2004	Palomar	NEAT	TIR	2.8 km	MPC · JPL
370669	2004 DN_{13}	—	February 16, 2004	Socorro	LINEAR	·	3.2 km	MPC · JPL
370670	2004 DF_{25}	—	February 19, 2004	Socorro	LINEAR	H	560 m	MPC · JPL
370671	2004 DR_{35}	—	February 19, 2004	Socorro	LINEAR	·	1.4 km	MPC · JPL
370672	2004 DQ_{37}	—	February 19, 2004	Socorro	LINEAR	·	1.8 km	MPC · JPL
370673	2004 DE_{38}	—	February 19, 2004	Haleakala	NEAT	NYS	1.4 km	MPC · JPL
370674	2004 EG_{16}	—	March 12, 2004	Palomar	NEAT	NYS	1.2 km	MPC · JPL
370675	2004 EN_{30}	—	March 15, 2004	Kitt Peak	Spacewatch	V	680 m	MPC · JPL
370676	2004 EK_{60}	—	March 15, 2004	Palomar	NEAT	·	4.8 km	MPC · JPL
370677	2004 EK_{62}	—	March 12, 2004	Palomar	NEAT	·	1.3 km	MPC · JPL
370678	2004 ER_{64}	—	March 14, 2004	Socorro	LINEAR	H	760 m	MPC · JPL
370679	2004 ED_{72}	—	March 15, 2004	Socorro	LINEAR	CYB	6.5 km	MPC · JPL
370680	2004 EE_{77}	—	March 15, 2004	Socorro	LINEAR	·	1.3 km	MPC · JPL
370681	2004 ER_{78}	—	March 15, 2004	Catalina	CSS	NYS	1.6 km	MPC · JPL
370682	2004 ES_{98}	—	March 15, 2004	Kitt Peak	Spacewatch	·	1.2 km	MPC · JPL
370683	2004 FL_{1}	—	March 16, 2004	Campo Imperatore	CINEOS	H	620 m	MPC · JPL
370684	2004 FM_{1}	—	March 17, 2004	Socorro	LINEAR	H	540 m	MPC · JPL
370685	2004 FJ_{7}	—	March 16, 2004	Kitt Peak	Spacewatch	V	610 m	MPC · JPL
370686	2004 FS_{123}	—	March 26, 2004	Kitt Peak	Deep Lens Survey	·	1.4 km	MPC · JPL
370687	2004 GZ_{26}	—	April 14, 2004	Anderson Mesa	LONEOS	EUN	1.8 km	MPC · JPL
370688	2004 GD_{28}	—	April 13, 2004	Palomar	NEAT	AMO +1km	1.2 km	MPC · JPL
370689	2004 GB_{46}	—	April 12, 2004	Kitt Peak	Spacewatch	·	1.3 km	MPC · JPL
370690	2004 GZ_{56}	—	April 14, 2004	Kitt Peak	Spacewatch	·	1.2 km	MPC · JPL
370691	2004 GL_{63}	—	April 13, 2004	Kitt Peak	Spacewatch	CYB	4.8 km	MPC · JPL
370692	2004 HW_{32}	—	April 21, 2004	Socorro	LINEAR	V	820 m	MPC · JPL
370693	2004 HA_{33}	—	April 22, 2004	Goodricke-Pigott	R. A. Tucker	·	1.6 km	MPC · JPL
370694	2004 HA_{56}	—	April 24, 2004	Haleakala	NEAT	·	1.8 km	MPC · JPL
370695	2004 HA_{61}	—	April 24, 2004	Kitt Peak	Spacewatch	·	1.3 km	MPC · JPL
370696	2004 JA_{3}	—	May 9, 2004	Palomar	NEAT	·	1.5 km	MPC · JPL
370697	2004 JL_{5}	—	May 9, 2004	Haleakala	NEAT	·	2.1 km	MPC · JPL
370698	2004 JP_{10}	—	May 12, 2004	Catalina	CSS	·	1.5 km	MPC · JPL
370699	2004 JD_{32}	—	May 13, 2004	Anderson Mesa	LONEOS	·	1.7 km	MPC · JPL
370700	2004 KV_{11}	—	May 21, 2004	Campo Imperatore	CINEOS	EUN	1.6 km	MPC · JPL

== 370701–370800 ==
back to top

Designation			Discovery			Properties		Ref
Permanent	Provisional	Named after	Date	Site	Discoverer(s)	Category	Diam.	Ref
370701	2004 MP_{5}	—	June 17, 2004	Kitt Peak	Spacewatch	·	2.0 km	MPC · JPL
370702	2004 NC_{9}	—	July 15, 2004	Socorro	LINEAR	AMO +1km	1.1 km	MPC · JPL
370703	2004 PS_{19}	—	August 8, 2004	Anderson Mesa	LONEOS	·	2.3 km	MPC · JPL
370704	2004 PD_{21}	—	August 7, 2004	Palomar	NEAT	·	2.0 km	MPC · JPL
370705	2004 PH_{33}	—	August 8, 2004	Socorro	LINEAR	·	2.6 km	MPC · JPL
370706	2004 PN_{46}	—	August 7, 2004	Campo Imperatore	CINEOS	·	2.0 km	MPC · JPL
370707	2004 PV_{52}	—	August 8, 2004	Socorro	LINEAR	·	2.0 km	MPC · JPL
370708	2004 PQ_{75}	—	August 8, 2004	Campo Imperatore	CINEOS	·	2.3 km	MPC · JPL
370709	2004 PP_{92}	—	August 12, 2004	Palomar	NEAT	·	3.1 km	MPC · JPL
370710	2004 PG_{97}	—	August 8, 2004	Socorro	LINEAR	·	2.2 km	MPC · JPL
370711	2004 PA_{100}	—	August 11, 2004	Socorro	LINEAR	·	3.1 km	MPC · JPL
370712	2004 QK_{5}	—	August 8, 2004	Socorro	LINEAR	JUN	1.3 km	MPC · JPL
370713	2004 QW_{12}	—	August 21, 2004	Siding Spring	SSS	·	2.2 km	MPC · JPL
370714	2004 QS_{21}	—	August 25, 2004	Kitt Peak	Spacewatch	·	2.4 km	MPC · JPL
370715	2004 RE_{4}	—	September 4, 2004	Palomar	NEAT	·	2.0 km	MPC · JPL
370716	2004 RJ_{4}	—	September 4, 2004	Palomar	NEAT	·	3.3 km	MPC · JPL
370717	2004 RQ_{11}	—	September 6, 2004	Siding Spring	SSS	·	2.0 km	MPC · JPL
370718	2004 RY_{11}	—	September 7, 2004	Kitt Peak	Spacewatch	JUN	1.2 km	MPC · JPL
370719	2004 RA_{13}	—	September 4, 2004	Palomar	NEAT	·	2.3 km	MPC · JPL
370720	2004 RW_{39}	—	September 7, 2004	Kitt Peak	Spacewatch	·	2.8 km	MPC · JPL
370721	2004 RF_{53}	—	September 8, 2004	Socorro	LINEAR	·	1.8 km	MPC · JPL
370722	2004 RT_{56}	—	September 8, 2004	Socorro	LINEAR	·	3.1 km	MPC · JPL
370723	2004 RC_{57}	—	September 8, 2004	Socorro	LINEAR	·	720 m	MPC · JPL
370724	2004 RM_{57}	—	September 8, 2004	Socorro	LINEAR	·	2.4 km	MPC · JPL
370725	2004 RC_{58}	—	September 8, 2004	Socorro	LINEAR	·	2.5 km	MPC · JPL
370726	2004 RH_{65}	—	September 8, 2004	Socorro	LINEAR	ADE	2.5 km	MPC · JPL
370727	2004 RA_{69}	—	September 8, 2004	Socorro	LINEAR	·	2.4 km	MPC · JPL
370728	2004 RV_{69}	—	September 8, 2004	Socorro	LINEAR	·	2.1 km	MPC · JPL
370729	2004 RV_{74}	—	September 8, 2004	Socorro	LINEAR	·	2.5 km	MPC · JPL
370730	2004 RQ_{75}	—	September 8, 2004	Socorro	LINEAR	·	1.5 km	MPC · JPL
370731	2004 RJ_{82}	—	September 9, 2004	Socorro	LINEAR	·	1.6 km	MPC · JPL
370732	2004 RV_{84}	—	July 14, 2004	Socorro	LINEAR	·	1.9 km	MPC · JPL
370733	2004 RH_{87}	—	September 7, 2004	Palomar	NEAT	·	2.2 km	MPC · JPL
370734	2004 RV_{112}	—	September 6, 2004	Socorro	LINEAR	·	2.8 km	MPC · JPL
370735	2004 RD_{113}	—	September 6, 2004	Socorro	LINEAR	·	2.3 km	MPC · JPL
370736	2004 RQ_{124}	—	September 7, 2004	Kitt Peak	Spacewatch	·	2.3 km	MPC · JPL
370737	2004 RU_{125}	—	September 7, 2004	Kitt Peak	Spacewatch	·	2.5 km	MPC · JPL
370738	2004 RV_{131}	—	September 7, 2004	Kitt Peak	Spacewatch	AGN	900 m	MPC · JPL
370739	2004 RN_{142}	—	September 8, 2004	Socorro	LINEAR	·	1.5 km	MPC · JPL
370740	2004 RR_{146}	—	September 9, 2004	Socorro	LINEAR	·	2.0 km	MPC · JPL
370741	2004 RP_{157}	—	September 10, 2004	Socorro	LINEAR	·	2.2 km	MPC · JPL
370742	2004 RC_{158}	—	September 10, 2004	Socorro	LINEAR	·	1.7 km	MPC · JPL
370743	2004 RG_{159}	—	September 10, 2004	Socorro	LINEAR	·	2.1 km	MPC · JPL
370744	2004 RL_{159}	—	September 10, 2004	Socorro	LINEAR	·	1.5 km	MPC · JPL
370745	2004 RT_{159}	—	September 10, 2004	Socorro	LINEAR	·	3.2 km	MPC · JPL
370746	2004 RZ_{162}	—	September 11, 2004	Socorro	LINEAR	·	2.8 km	MPC · JPL
370747	2004 RY_{179}	—	September 10, 2004	Socorro	LINEAR	·	2.5 km	MPC · JPL
370748	2004 RW_{181}	—	September 10, 2004	Socorro	LINEAR	·	1.9 km	MPC · JPL
370749	2004 RH_{186}	—	September 10, 2004	Socorro	LINEAR	·	2.8 km	MPC · JPL
370750	2004 RU_{191}	—	August 19, 2004	Socorro	LINEAR	·	2.8 km	MPC · JPL
370751	2004 RZ_{198}	—	September 10, 2004	Socorro	LINEAR	·	2.5 km	MPC · JPL
370752	2004 RA_{209}	—	August 20, 2004	Catalina	CSS	·	2.3 km	MPC · JPL
370753	2004 RB_{214}	—	September 11, 2004	Socorro	LINEAR	TIN	1.2 km	MPC · JPL
370754	2004 RJ_{228}	—	September 9, 2004	Kitt Peak	Spacewatch	NEM	2.5 km	MPC · JPL
370755	2004 RZ_{231}	—	September 9, 2004	Kitt Peak	Spacewatch	·	2.1 km	MPC · JPL
370756	2004 RT_{248}	—	September 12, 2004	Socorro	LINEAR	GAL	1.9 km	MPC · JPL
370757	2004 RL_{250}	—	September 13, 2004	Socorro	LINEAR	·	3.8 km	MPC · JPL
370758	2004 RZ_{252}	—	September 15, 2004	Socorro	LINEAR	GAL	2.2 km	MPC · JPL
370759	2004 RR_{253}	—	September 6, 2004	Palomar	NEAT	·	1.9 km	MPC · JPL
370760	2004 RQ_{255}	—	September 6, 2004	Palomar	NEAT	·	2.3 km	MPC · JPL
370761	2004 RB_{257}	—	September 9, 2004	Socorro	LINEAR	·	2.6 km	MPC · JPL
370762	2004 RH_{264}	—	September 10, 2004	Kitt Peak	Spacewatch	·	1.7 km	MPC · JPL
370763	2004 RZ_{271}	—	September 11, 2004	Kitt Peak	Spacewatch	·	1.9 km	MPC · JPL
370764	2004 RM_{277}	—	September 13, 2004	Kitt Peak	Spacewatch	·	1.7 km	MPC · JPL
370765	2004 RR_{283}	—	September 15, 2004	Kitt Peak	Spacewatch	·	1.8 km	MPC · JPL
370766	2004 RJ_{285}	—	September 15, 2004	Kitt Peak	Spacewatch	·	2.3 km	MPC · JPL
370767	2004 RX_{294}	—	September 11, 2004	Kitt Peak	Spacewatch	·	1.8 km	MPC · JPL
370768	2004 RN_{301}	—	September 11, 2004	Kitt Peak	Spacewatch	·	1.5 km	MPC · JPL
370769	2004 RM_{303}	—	September 12, 2004	Kitt Peak	Spacewatch	·	2.0 km	MPC · JPL
370770	2004 RK_{304}	—	September 12, 2004	Kitt Peak	Spacewatch	·	1.7 km	MPC · JPL
370771	2004 RX_{309}	—	August 21, 2004	Catalina	CSS	·	2.5 km	MPC · JPL
370772	2004 RK_{314}	—	September 15, 2004	Kitt Peak	Spacewatch	·	1.9 km	MPC · JPL
370773	2004 RY_{317}	—	September 12, 2004	Kitt Peak	Spacewatch	·	1.8 km	MPC · JPL
370774	2004 RK_{328}	—	September 15, 2004	Anderson Mesa	LONEOS	GEF	2.3 km	MPC · JPL
370775	2004 RR_{335}	—	September 15, 2004	Kitt Peak	Spacewatch	(13314)	1.8 km	MPC · JPL
370776	2004 RW_{335}	—	September 15, 2004	Kitt Peak	Spacewatch	·	2.1 km	MPC · JPL
370777	2004 RV_{339}	—	September 8, 2004	Socorro	LINEAR	GEF	1.6 km	MPC · JPL
370778	2004 RL_{356}	—	September 10, 2004	Kitt Peak	Spacewatch	·	1.9 km	MPC · JPL
370779	2004 SO_{16}	—	September 17, 2004	Anderson Mesa	LONEOS	·	2.1 km	MPC · JPL
370780	2004 SQ_{24}	—	September 18, 2004	Siding Spring	SSS	·	1.8 km	MPC · JPL
370781	2004 SA_{40}	—	September 17, 2004	Socorro	LINEAR	·	2.7 km	MPC · JPL
370782	2004 SC_{43}	—	September 18, 2004	Socorro	LINEAR	·	2.4 km	MPC · JPL
370783	2004 SK_{48}	—	September 18, 2004	Socorro	LINEAR	·	2.8 km	MPC · JPL
370784	2004 SJ_{50}	—	September 22, 2004	Socorro	LINEAR	DOR	2.6 km	MPC · JPL
370785	2004 SS_{55}	—	September 24, 2004	Goodricke-Pigott	R. A. Tucker	·	2.9 km	MPC · JPL
370786	2004 SD_{62}	—	September 22, 2004	Kitt Peak	Spacewatch	·	1.6 km	MPC · JPL
370787	2004 TB_{4}	—	October 4, 2004	Kitt Peak	Spacewatch	·	1.8 km	MPC · JPL
370788	2004 TM_{27}	—	October 4, 2004	Kitt Peak	Spacewatch	·	2.7 km	MPC · JPL
370789	2004 TU_{33}	—	October 4, 2004	Anderson Mesa	LONEOS	DOR	3.5 km	MPC · JPL
370790	2004 TZ_{37}	—	October 4, 2004	Kitt Peak	Spacewatch	·	1.9 km	MPC · JPL
370791	2004 TX_{65}	—	October 5, 2004	Anderson Mesa	LONEOS	·	1.9 km	MPC · JPL
370792	2004 TH_{81}	—	September 18, 2004	Socorro	LINEAR	·	1.7 km	MPC · JPL
370793	2004 TE_{82}	—	September 24, 2004	Kitt Peak	Spacewatch	·	2.1 km	MPC · JPL
370794	2004 TK_{93}	—	October 5, 2004	Kitt Peak	Spacewatch	·	1.6 km	MPC · JPL
370795	2004 TK_{96}	—	October 5, 2004	Kitt Peak	Spacewatch	·	1.8 km	MPC · JPL
370796 Gasiūnas	2004 TE_{115}	Gasiūnas	October 12, 2004	Moletai	K. Černis	615	1.4 km	MPC · JPL
370797	2004 TL_{116}	—	October 4, 2004	Socorro	LINEAR	·	3.0 km	MPC · JPL
370798	2004 TN_{119}	—	October 6, 2004	Palomar	NEAT	·	2.0 km	MPC · JPL
370799	2004 TS_{125}	—	October 7, 2004	Socorro	LINEAR	PAD	3.1 km	MPC · JPL
370800	2004 TZ_{147}	—	October 6, 2004	Kitt Peak	Spacewatch	AGN	950 m	MPC · JPL

== 370801–370900 ==
back to top

Designation			Discovery			Properties		Ref
Permanent	Provisional	Named after	Date	Site	Discoverer(s)	Category	Diam.	Ref
370801	2004 TF_{149}	—	October 6, 2004	Kitt Peak	Spacewatch	MRX	1.2 km	MPC · JPL
370802	2004 TE_{151}	—	October 6, 2004	Kitt Peak	Spacewatch	·	1.9 km	MPC · JPL
370803	2004 TR_{173}	—	October 8, 2004	Socorro	LINEAR	·	2.3 km	MPC · JPL
370804	2004 TA_{176}	—	October 9, 2004	Socorro	LINEAR	DOR	2.9 km	MPC · JPL
370805	2004 TQ_{204}	—	October 7, 2004	Kitt Peak	Spacewatch	AGN	1.5 km	MPC · JPL
370806	2004 TA_{218}	—	October 5, 2004	Kitt Peak	Spacewatch	·	1.6 km	MPC · JPL
370807	2004 TS_{233}	—	October 4, 2004	Kitt Peak	Spacewatch	·	2.7 km	MPC · JPL
370808	2004 TT_{241}	—	October 10, 2004	Socorro	LINEAR	·	3.4 km	MPC · JPL
370809	2004 TV_{241}	—	October 10, 2004	Palomar	NEAT	·	2.9 km	MPC · JPL
370810	2004 TP_{245}	—	October 7, 2004	Kitt Peak	Spacewatch	·	2.4 km	MPC · JPL
370811	2004 TL_{264}	—	October 9, 2004	Kitt Peak	Spacewatch	·	2.2 km	MPC · JPL
370812	2004 TA_{282}	—	October 11, 2004	Palomar	NEAT	·	2.3 km	MPC · JPL
370813	2004 TN_{286}	—	October 9, 2004	Kitt Peak	Spacewatch	·	2.0 km	MPC · JPL
370814	2004 TL_{290}	—	October 10, 2004	Kitt Peak	Spacewatch	AGN	1.1 km	MPC · JPL
370815	2004 TF_{296}	—	October 10, 2004	Kitt Peak	Spacewatch	BRA	1.3 km	MPC · JPL
370816	2004 TZ_{297}	—	October 12, 2004	Anderson Mesa	LONEOS	·	2.8 km	MPC · JPL
370817	2004 TL_{314}	—	September 23, 2004	Kitt Peak	Spacewatch	·	1.6 km	MPC · JPL
370818	2004 TU_{322}	—	October 11, 2004	Kitt Peak	Spacewatch	·	2.0 km	MPC · JPL
370819	2004 TP_{346}	—	October 15, 2004	Anderson Mesa	LONEOS	·	2.8 km	MPC · JPL
370820	2004 TE_{366}	—	October 8, 2004	Kitt Peak	Spacewatch	·	2.7 km	MPC · JPL
370821	2004 TF_{366}	—	October 8, 2004	Kitt Peak	Spacewatch	·	2.9 km	MPC · JPL
370822	2004 TE_{369}	—	October 13, 2004	Kitt Peak	Spacewatch	·	1.8 km	MPC · JPL
370823	2004 UB_{3}	—	October 18, 2004	Socorro	LINEAR	·	3.6 km	MPC · JPL
370824	2004 UG_{8}	—	October 21, 2004	Socorro	LINEAR	·	2.8 km	MPC · JPL
370825	2004 VX_{18}	—	November 4, 2004	Kitt Peak	Spacewatch	·	3.3 km	MPC · JPL
370826	2004 VE_{26}	—	November 4, 2004	Catalina	CSS	·	2.5 km	MPC · JPL
370827	2004 VQ_{27}	—	November 5, 2004	Palomar	NEAT	·	3.0 km	MPC · JPL
370828	2004 VE_{33}	—	November 3, 2004	Kitt Peak	Spacewatch	·	2.2 km	MPC · JPL
370829	2004 VL_{55}	—	November 10, 2004	Socorro	LINEAR	·	810 m	MPC · JPL
370830	2004 VA_{80}	—	November 3, 2004	Anderson Mesa	LONEOS	·	2.3 km	MPC · JPL
370831	2004 VO_{80}	—	November 3, 2004	Palomar	NEAT	·	2.6 km	MPC · JPL
370832	2004 VL_{82}	—	November 9, 2004	Catalina	CSS	·	3.1 km	MPC · JPL
370833	2004 XR_{19}	—	December 8, 2004	Socorro	LINEAR	·	1.8 km	MPC · JPL
370834	2004 XP_{60}	—	December 12, 2004	Kitt Peak	Spacewatch	·	3.3 km	MPC · JPL
370835	2004 XA_{62}	—	December 12, 2004	Socorro	LINEAR	GEF	1.7 km	MPC · JPL
370836	2004 XW_{93}	—	December 11, 2004	Kitt Peak	Spacewatch	NAE	4.9 km	MPC · JPL
370837	2004 XT_{131}	—	December 11, 2004	Socorro	LINEAR	·	2.4 km	MPC · JPL
370838	2004 XW_{161}	—	December 15, 2004	Socorro	LINEAR	·	820 m	MPC · JPL
370839	2004 YO_{20}	—	December 19, 2004	Mount Lemmon	Mount Lemmon Survey	·	950 m	MPC · JPL
370840	2004 YT_{20}	—	December 18, 2004	Mount Lemmon	Mount Lemmon Survey	EOS	2.2 km	MPC · JPL
370841	2005 AL_{44}	—	January 15, 2005	Kitt Peak	Spacewatch	LIX	4.0 km	MPC · JPL
370842	2005 BH_{30}	—	January 16, 2005	Mauna Kea	Veillet, C.	KOR	1.5 km	MPC · JPL
370843	2005 BP_{36}	—	December 19, 2004	Mount Lemmon	Mount Lemmon Survey	·	2.6 km	MPC · JPL
370844	2005 CP_{9}	—	February 1, 2005	Kitt Peak	Spacewatch	·	3.2 km	MPC · JPL
370845	2005 CL_{10}	—	February 1, 2005	Kitt Peak	Spacewatch	·	1.2 km	MPC · JPL
370846	2005 CY_{14}	—	February 2, 2005	Kitt Peak	Spacewatch	KOR	1.8 km	MPC · JPL
370847	2005 CO_{21}	—	February 2, 2005	Catalina	CSS	·	4.9 km	MPC · JPL
370848	2005 CE_{38}	—	January 9, 2005	Catalina	CSS	·	3.1 km	MPC · JPL
370849	2005 CK_{40}	—	February 9, 2005	La Silla	A. Boattini, H. Scholl	·	2.5 km	MPC · JPL
370850	2005 CL_{43}	—	December 20, 2004	Mount Lemmon	Mount Lemmon Survey	·	890 m	MPC · JPL
370851	2005 CT_{45}	—	February 2, 2005	Kitt Peak	Spacewatch	·	3.9 km	MPC · JPL
370852	2005 CY_{46}	—	November 20, 2003	Kitt Peak	Spacewatch	·	2.6 km	MPC · JPL
370853	2005 CL_{58}	—	February 2, 2005	Catalina	CSS	TIR	3.4 km	MPC · JPL
370854	2005 CO_{64}	—	February 9, 2005	Mount Lemmon	Mount Lemmon Survey	·	2.8 km	MPC · JPL
370855	2005 CL_{72}	—	February 1, 2005	Kitt Peak	Spacewatch	·	2.4 km	MPC · JPL
370856	2005 CA_{76}	—	February 2, 2005	Kitt Peak	Spacewatch	·	780 m	MPC · JPL
370857	2005 EK_{2}	—	March 1, 2005	Gnosca	S. Sposetti	NYS	950 m	MPC · JPL
370858	2005 EF_{3}	—	March 1, 2005	Kitt Peak	Spacewatch	·	3.0 km	MPC · JPL
370859	2005 EO_{3}	—	March 1, 2005	Kitt Peak	Spacewatch	EOS	2.1 km	MPC · JPL
370860	2005 EY_{11}	—	March 2, 2005	Catalina	CSS	·	1.0 km	MPC · JPL
370861	2005 EJ_{24}	—	March 3, 2005	Kitt Peak	Spacewatch	·	990 m	MPC · JPL
370862	2005 EK_{24}	—	March 3, 2005	Catalina	CSS	·	940 m	MPC · JPL
370863	2005 EV_{26}	—	March 3, 2005	Catalina	CSS	·	1.1 km	MPC · JPL
370864	2005 EF_{27}	—	March 3, 2005	Catalina	CSS	·	1.0 km	MPC · JPL
370865	2005 ES_{34}	—	March 3, 2005	Kitt Peak	Spacewatch	·	1.3 km	MPC · JPL
370866	2005 EB_{37}	—	March 4, 2005	Socorro	LINEAR	·	1.8 km	MPC · JPL
370867	2005 EE_{55}	—	March 4, 2005	Kitt Peak	Spacewatch	·	670 m	MPC · JPL
370868	2005 EX_{55}	—	March 4, 2005	Kitt Peak	Spacewatch	·	5.4 km	MPC · JPL
370869	2005 EW_{62}	—	March 4, 2005	Mount Lemmon	Mount Lemmon Survey	·	1.7 km	MPC · JPL
370870	2005 ET_{72}	—	March 2, 2005	Catalina	CSS	·	4.2 km	MPC · JPL
370871	2005 EZ_{80}	—	March 4, 2005	Calvin-Rehoboth	Calvin College	·	4.0 km	MPC · JPL
370872	2005 EN_{83}	—	March 4, 2005	Kitt Peak	Spacewatch	·	3.5 km	MPC · JPL
370873	2005 ES_{85}	—	December 15, 2004	Campo Imperatore	CINEOS	·	4.2 km	MPC · JPL
370874	2005 EH_{88}	—	March 8, 2005	Anderson Mesa	LONEOS	TIR	3.5 km	MPC · JPL
370875	2005 ET_{90}	—	March 8, 2005	Socorro	LINEAR	HYG	3.8 km	MPC · JPL
370876	2005 EF_{97}	—	March 3, 2005	Catalina	CSS	·	4.9 km	MPC · JPL
370877	2005 EQ_{99}	—	March 3, 2005	Catalina	CSS	·	1.0 km	MPC · JPL
370878	2005 EV_{102}	—	March 4, 2005	Kitt Peak	Spacewatch	EOS	1.8 km	MPC · JPL
370879	2005 EB_{103}	—	March 4, 2005	Kitt Peak	Spacewatch	THM	3.3 km	MPC · JPL
370880	2005 EV_{111}	—	March 4, 2005	Mount Lemmon	Mount Lemmon Survey	·	4.6 km	MPC · JPL
370881	2005 EO_{152}	—	March 10, 2005	Kitt Peak	Spacewatch	·	740 m	MPC · JPL
370882	2005 EC_{158}	—	March 9, 2005	Mount Lemmon	Mount Lemmon Survey	·	810 m	MPC · JPL
370883	2005 EA_{159}	—	March 9, 2005	Mount Lemmon	Mount Lemmon Survey	MAS	760 m	MPC · JPL
370884	2005 EP_{161}	—	March 9, 2005	Mount Lemmon	Mount Lemmon Survey	·	1.1 km	MPC · JPL
370885	2005 EH_{164}	—	March 11, 2005	Kitt Peak	Spacewatch	·	4.6 km	MPC · JPL
370886	2005 EZ_{168}	—	March 1, 2005	Kitt Peak	Spacewatch	·	680 m	MPC · JPL
370887	2005 EP_{198}	—	March 11, 2005	Mount Lemmon	Mount Lemmon Survey	·	3.6 km	MPC · JPL
370888	2005 EO_{205}	—	March 12, 2005	Kitt Peak	Spacewatch	·	4.0 km	MPC · JPL
370889	2005 EJ_{208}	—	March 4, 2005	Kitt Peak	Spacewatch	·	3.7 km	MPC · JPL
370890	2005 EC_{213}	—	March 4, 2005	Mount Lemmon	Mount Lemmon Survey	·	2.5 km	MPC · JPL
370891	2005 EM_{224}	—	March 12, 2005	Socorro	LINEAR	·	820 m	MPC · JPL
370892	2005 EY_{238}	—	March 11, 2005	Kitt Peak	Spacewatch	·	3.6 km	MPC · JPL
370893	2005 EP_{239}	—	March 11, 2005	Kitt Peak	Spacewatch	·	3.2 km	MPC · JPL
370894	2005 EZ_{270}	—	March 3, 2005	Kitt Peak	Spacewatch	·	4.0 km	MPC · JPL
370895	2005 ER_{287}	—	February 9, 2005	Kitt Peak	Spacewatch	·	1.0 km	MPC · JPL
370896	2005 EP_{299}	—	March 11, 2005	Kitt Peak	M. W. Buie	·	3.8 km	MPC · JPL
370897	2005 ET_{309}	—	March 9, 2005	Mount Lemmon	Mount Lemmon Survey	·	770 m	MPC · JPL
370898	2005 EZ_{329}	—	March 4, 2005	Mount Lemmon	Mount Lemmon Survey	·	3.0 km	MPC · JPL
370899	2005 EC_{330}	—	March 8, 2005	Mount Lemmon	Mount Lemmon Survey	THM	2.7 km	MPC · JPL
370900	2005 GC_{17}	—	March 11, 2005	Mount Lemmon	Mount Lemmon Survey	·	620 m	MPC · JPL

== 370901–371000 ==
back to top

Designation			Discovery			Properties		Ref
Permanent	Provisional	Named after	Date	Site	Discoverer(s)	Category	Diam.	Ref
370901	2005 GZ_{45}	—	April 5, 2005	Mount Lemmon	Mount Lemmon Survey	·	3.7 km	MPC · JPL
370902	2005 GF_{56}	—	April 6, 2005	Mount Lemmon	Mount Lemmon Survey	·	3.9 km	MPC · JPL
370903	2005 GU_{56}	—	April 6, 2005	Kitt Peak	Spacewatch	·	1.1 km	MPC · JPL
370904	2005 GS_{63}	—	April 2, 2005	Catalina	CSS	PHO	860 m	MPC · JPL
370905	2005 GD_{73}	—	April 4, 2005	Catalina	CSS	·	1.7 km	MPC · JPL
370906	2005 GK_{75}	—	April 5, 2005	Mount Lemmon	Mount Lemmon Survey	NYS	820 m	MPC · JPL
370907	2005 GW_{115}	—	October 16, 2003	Kitt Peak	Spacewatch	·	900 m	MPC · JPL
370908	2005 GX_{127}	—	April 9, 2005	Socorro	LINEAR	ERI	1.8 km	MPC · JPL
370909	2005 GK_{222}	—	April 10, 2005	Kitt Peak	Spacewatch	·	660 m	MPC · JPL
370910	2005 GY_{225}	—	April 6, 2005	Mount Lemmon	Mount Lemmon Survey	·	980 m	MPC · JPL
370911	2005 JZ_{50}	—	May 4, 2005	Kitt Peak	Spacewatch	·	750 m	MPC · JPL
370912	2005 JL_{70}	—	April 11, 2005	Mount Lemmon	Mount Lemmon Survey	V	780 m	MPC · JPL
370913	2005 JG_{86}	—	May 8, 2005	Mount Lemmon	Mount Lemmon Survey	NYS	1.2 km	MPC · JPL
370914	2005 JA_{160}	—	May 7, 2005	Mount Lemmon	Mount Lemmon Survey	MAS	690 m	MPC · JPL
370915	2005 KJ_{6}	—	May 8, 2005	Mount Lemmon	Mount Lemmon Survey	·	1.2 km	MPC · JPL
370916	2005 LY_{4}	—	June 1, 2005	Kitt Peak	Spacewatch	·	2.8 km	MPC · JPL
370917	2005 LP_{9}	—	June 1, 2005	Kitt Peak	Spacewatch	V	920 m	MPC · JPL
370918	2005 LG_{11}	—	June 3, 2005	Kitt Peak	Spacewatch	V	680 m	MPC · JPL
370919	2005 LS_{14}	—	May 3, 2005	Kitt Peak	Spacewatch	·	1.3 km	MPC · JPL
370920	2005 MA_{31}	—	May 20, 2005	Mount Lemmon	Mount Lemmon Survey	NYS	1.4 km	MPC · JPL
370921	2005 NO_{12}	—	July 4, 2005	Mount Lemmon	Mount Lemmon Survey	·	1.3 km	MPC · JPL
370922	2005 NY_{35}	—	July 5, 2005	Palomar	NEAT	·	1.3 km	MPC · JPL
370923	2005 NY_{68}	—	July 3, 2005	Catalina	CSS	T_{j} (2.94)	6.1 km	MPC · JPL
370924	2005 NE_{72}	—	July 6, 2005	Kitt Peak	Spacewatch	·	1.2 km	MPC · JPL
370925	2005 NT_{77}	—	July 11, 2005	Mount Lemmon	Mount Lemmon Survey	NYS	1.1 km	MPC · JPL
370926	2005 NZ_{89}	—	July 4, 2005	Mount Lemmon	Mount Lemmon Survey	·	1.1 km	MPC · JPL
370927	2005 NA_{125}	—	July 4, 2005	Palomar	NEAT	·	1.2 km	MPC · JPL
370928	2005 OM_{6}	—	July 28, 2005	Palomar	NEAT	·	960 m	MPC · JPL
370929	2005 PG_{7}	—	August 1, 2005	Siding Spring	SSS	HIL · 3:2 · (3561)	6.4 km	MPC · JPL
370930	2005 QM_{16}	—	August 25, 2005	Palomar	NEAT	H	550 m	MPC · JPL
370931	2005 QB_{34}	—	August 25, 2005	Palomar	NEAT	T_{j} (2.99) · 3:2	4.8 km	MPC · JPL
370932	2005 QU_{54}	—	August 28, 2005	Kitt Peak	Spacewatch	·	1.2 km	MPC · JPL
370933	2005 QU_{122}	—	August 28, 2005	Kitt Peak	Spacewatch	·	1.2 km	MPC · JPL
370934	2005 QO_{129}	—	August 28, 2005	Kitt Peak	Spacewatch	·	1.2 km	MPC · JPL
370935	2005 QA_{154}	—	August 27, 2005	Palomar	NEAT	·	1.8 km	MPC · JPL
370936	2005 QK_{166}	—	August 31, 2005	Campo Imperatore	CINEOS	H	650 m	MPC · JPL
370937	2005 QS_{180}	—	August 28, 2005	Kitt Peak	Spacewatch	3:2 · SHU	5.2 km	MPC · JPL
370938	2005 RN_{1}	—	September 1, 2005	Palomar	NEAT	·	990 m	MPC · JPL
370939	2005 RG_{5}	—	September 5, 2005	Siding Spring	SSS	·	1.6 km	MPC · JPL
370940	2005 RD_{31}	—	August 28, 2005	Kitt Peak	Spacewatch	RAF	1.2 km	MPC · JPL
370941	2005 RE_{42}	—	September 14, 2005	Kitt Peak	Spacewatch	3:2	5.1 km	MPC · JPL
370942	2005 RQ_{51}	—	September 14, 2005	Catalina	CSS	·	800 m	MPC · JPL
370943	2005 SK_{1}	—	September 23, 2005	Kitt Peak	Spacewatch	H	490 m	MPC · JPL
370944	2005 SO_{16}	—	September 26, 2005	Kitt Peak	Spacewatch	·	1.4 km	MPC · JPL
370945	2005 SF_{32}	—	September 23, 2005	Kitt Peak	Spacewatch	·	1.1 km	MPC · JPL
370946	2005 SY_{38}	—	September 24, 2005	Kitt Peak	Spacewatch	(5)	940 m	MPC · JPL
370947	2005 SM_{42}	—	September 24, 2005	Kitt Peak	Spacewatch	·	1.2 km	MPC · JPL
370948	2005 SQ_{44}	—	September 24, 2005	Kitt Peak	Spacewatch	(5)	1.3 km	MPC · JPL
370949	2005 SH_{45}	—	September 24, 2005	Kitt Peak	Spacewatch	EUN	1.0 km	MPC · JPL
370950	2005 SL_{47}	—	September 24, 2005	Kitt Peak	Spacewatch	·	1.0 km	MPC · JPL
370951	2005 SJ_{49}	—	September 24, 2005	Kitt Peak	Spacewatch	·	570 m	MPC · JPL
370952	2005 SA_{54}	—	September 25, 2005	Kitt Peak	Spacewatch	(5)	1.3 km	MPC · JPL
370953	2005 SS_{60}	—	September 26, 2005	Kitt Peak	Spacewatch	·	930 m	MPC · JPL
370954	2005 SH_{65}	—	September 26, 2005	Kitt Peak	Spacewatch	·	1.4 km	MPC · JPL
370955	2005 ST_{76}	—	September 24, 2005	Kitt Peak	Spacewatch	·	920 m	MPC · JPL
370956	2005 SQ_{79}	—	September 24, 2005	Kitt Peak	Spacewatch	·	750 m	MPC · JPL
370957	2005 SA_{81}	—	September 24, 2005	Kitt Peak	Spacewatch	·	880 m	MPC · JPL
370958	2005 SJ_{82}	—	September 24, 2005	Kitt Peak	Spacewatch	·	790 m	MPC · JPL
370959	2005 SO_{91}	—	September 24, 2005	Kitt Peak	Spacewatch	·	1.7 km	MPC · JPL
370960	2005 SU_{92}	—	September 24, 2005	Kitt Peak	Spacewatch	·	950 m	MPC · JPL
370961	2005 SA_{96}	—	September 25, 2005	Kitt Peak	Spacewatch	(5)	960 m	MPC · JPL
370962	2005 SF_{121}	—	September 29, 2005	Kitt Peak	Spacewatch	·	970 m	MPC · JPL
370963	2005 SB_{124}	—	September 29, 2005	Anderson Mesa	LONEOS	(5)	900 m	MPC · JPL
370964	2005 SD_{131}	—	September 29, 2005	Mount Lemmon	Mount Lemmon Survey	·	1.0 km	MPC · JPL
370965	2005 SN_{131}	—	September 29, 2005	Kitt Peak	Spacewatch	·	1.1 km	MPC · JPL
370966	2005 ST_{133}	—	September 29, 2005	Kitt Peak	Spacewatch	·	1.1 km	MPC · JPL
370967	2005 SB_{143}	—	September 25, 2005	Kitt Peak	Spacewatch	(5)	1.1 km	MPC · JPL
370968	2005 SK_{160}	—	September 27, 2005	Kitt Peak	Spacewatch	·	970 m	MPC · JPL
370969	2005 SB_{176}	—	September 29, 2005	Kitt Peak	Spacewatch	·	1.7 km	MPC · JPL
370970	2005 SE_{181}	—	September 29, 2005	Kitt Peak	Spacewatch	·	1.4 km	MPC · JPL
370971	2005 SD_{192}	—	September 29, 2005	Mount Lemmon	Mount Lemmon Survey	H ·	680 m	MPC · JPL
370972	2005 SC_{193}	—	September 29, 2005	Kitt Peak	Spacewatch	·	1.4 km	MPC · JPL
370973	2005 SK_{211}	—	September 30, 2005	Palomar	NEAT	(5)	1.0 km	MPC · JPL
370974	2005 SE_{215}	—	September 30, 2005	Catalina	CSS	·	1.2 km	MPC · JPL
370975	2005 SX_{222}	—	September 30, 2005	Kitt Peak	Spacewatch	H	600 m	MPC · JPL
370976	2005 SA_{233}	—	September 30, 2005	Mount Lemmon	Mount Lemmon Survey	·	1.0 km	MPC · JPL
370977	2005 SA_{237}	—	September 29, 2005	Kitt Peak	Spacewatch	·	740 m	MPC · JPL
370978	2005 SY_{239}	—	September 30, 2005	Kitt Peak	Spacewatch	·	1.0 km	MPC · JPL
370979	2005 SG_{240}	—	September 30, 2005	Kitt Peak	Spacewatch	·	1.3 km	MPC · JPL
370980	2005 SS_{245}	—	September 30, 2005	Mount Lemmon	Mount Lemmon Survey	·	1.1 km	MPC · JPL
370981	2005 SZ_{245}	—	September 30, 2005	Mount Lemmon	Mount Lemmon Survey	·	1.6 km	MPC · JPL
370982	2005 SR_{264}	—	September 25, 2005	Palomar	NEAT	·	860 m	MPC · JPL
370983	2005 SJ_{265}	—	September 26, 2005	Palomar	NEAT	·	690 m	MPC · JPL
370984	2005 SV_{280}	—	September 29, 2005	Catalina	CSS	·	900 m	MPC · JPL
370985	2005 SL_{281}	—	September 30, 2005	Mount Lemmon	Mount Lemmon Survey	(5)	1.5 km	MPC · JPL
370986	2005 SU_{287}	—	September 26, 2005	Apache Point	A. C. Becker	·	1.6 km	MPC · JPL
370987	2005 SD_{289}	—	September 23, 2005	Kitt Peak	Spacewatch	·	870 m	MPC · JPL
370988	2005 SD_{291}	—	September 30, 2005	Mount Lemmon	Mount Lemmon Survey	·	1.3 km	MPC · JPL
370989	2005 SC_{292}	—	September 29, 2005	Kitt Peak	Spacewatch	·	1.1 km	MPC · JPL
370990	2005 TO_{17}	—	October 1, 2005	Mount Lemmon	Mount Lemmon Survey	KON	2.0 km	MPC · JPL
370991	2005 TP_{31}	—	October 1, 2005	Kitt Peak	Spacewatch	·	950 m	MPC · JPL
370992	2005 TH_{40}	—	September 23, 2005	Kitt Peak	Spacewatch	(5)	1.4 km	MPC · JPL
370993	2005 TO_{40}	—	October 1, 2005	Kitt Peak	Spacewatch	·	1.0 km	MPC · JPL
370994	2005 TC_{42}	—	October 3, 2005	Catalina	CSS	·	1.4 km	MPC · JPL
370995	2005 TZ_{45}	—	October 9, 2005	Ottmarsheim	Ottmarsheim	·	1.3 km	MPC · JPL
370996	2005 TM_{51}	—	October 11, 2005	Bergisch Gladbach	W. Bickel	·	1.0 km	MPC · JPL
370997	2005 TS_{56}	—	October 1, 2005	Catalina	CSS	·	830 m	MPC · JPL
370998	2005 TB_{75}	—	October 1, 2005	Kitt Peak	Spacewatch	·	1.6 km	MPC · JPL
370999	2005 TK_{75}	—	October 3, 2005	Socorro	LINEAR	MAR	1.3 km	MPC · JPL
371000	2005 TD_{90}	—	October 5, 2005	Kitt Peak	Spacewatch	·	1.2 km	MPC · JPL

back to top

== See also ==
- Meanings of minor-planet names: 370001–371000
