= Meanings of minor-planet names: 279001–280000 =

As minor planet discoveries are confirmed, they are given a permanent number by the IAU's Minor Planet Center (MPC), and the discoverers can then submit names for them, following the IAU's naming conventions. The list below concerns those minor planets in the specified number-range that have received names, and explains the meanings of those names.

Official naming citations of newly named small Solar System bodies are approved and published in a bulletin by IAU's Working Group for Small Bodies Nomenclature (WGSBN). Before May 2021, citations were published in MPC's Minor Planet Circulars for many decades. Recent citations can also be found on the JPL Small-Body Database (SBDB). Until his death in 2016, German astronomer Lutz D. Schmadel compiled these citations into the Dictionary of Minor Planet Names (DMP) and regularly updated the collection.

Based on Paul Herget's The Names of the Minor Planets, Schmadel also researched the unclear origin of numerous asteroids, most of which had been named prior to World War II. This article incorporates text from this source, which is in the public domain: SBDB New namings may only be added to this list below after official publication as the preannouncement of names is condemned. The WGSBN publishes a comprehensive guideline for the naming rules of non-cometary small Solar System bodies.

== 279001–279100 ==
Named minor planet	Provisional	This minor planet was named for...	Ref · Catalog
279035 Mara	2008 VX_{4}	Mara Ruiz (born 2000), the daughter of Spanish co-discoverer Jose Maria Ruiz (currently not credited by the Minor Planet Center).	JPL · 279035
279037 Utezimmer	2008 VU_{13}	Ute Zimmer (born 1964) is a German amateur astronomer who started her work in 2007 at the Taunus Observatory in Frankfurt am Main. She has discovered numerous minor planets, including the Apollo-type object 2009 DM_{45}.	IAU · 279037

== 279101–279200 ==
back to top

Named minor planet	Provisional	This minor planet was named for...	Ref · Catalog
279119 Khamatova	2009 OY_{1}	Chulpan Khamatova (born 1975), a Russian theater and film actress	JPL · 279119

== 279201–279300 ==
back to top

Named minor planet	Provisional	This minor planet was named for...	Ref · Catalog
279226 Demisroussos	2009 UR_{103}	Demis Roussos (1946–2015), a Greek singer and performer, best remembered for being a member of Aphrodite's Child, a rock band that also included Greek musician Vangelis	JPL · 279226
279274 Shurpakov	2009 WL_{8}	Sergey Shurpakov (born 1966), a Belarusian amateur astronomer, observer of comets and discoverer of minor planets and coordinator of the "International Comet Quarterly" (ICQ) for Belarus	JPL · 279274

== 279301–279400 ==
back to top

Named minor planet	Provisional	This minor planet was named for...	Ref · Catalog
279377 Lechmankiewicz	2010 CH_{1}	Lech Mankiewicz (born 1960), a director of the Center for Theoretical Physics of the Polish Academy of Sciences in Warsaw.	JPL · 279377
279397 Dombeck	2010 DN_{77}	Thomas W. Dombeck (1945–2016) received his Physics PhD from Northwestern University. He displayed his creative genius as professor, research scientist, project director for Pan-STARRS, husband and father.	JPL · 279397

== 279401–279500 ==
back to top

Named minor planet	Provisional	This minor planet was named for...	Ref · Catalog
279410 McCallon	2010 EF_{144}	Howard McCallon (born 1945), an American engineer.	JPL · 279410

== 279501–279600 ==
back to top

Named minor planet	Provisional	This minor planet was named for...	Ref · Catalog
There are no named minor planets in this number range

== 279601–279700 ==
back to top

Named minor planet	Provisional	This minor planet was named for...	Ref · Catalog
There are no named minor planets in this number range

== 279701–279800 ==
back to top

Named minor planet	Provisional	This minor planet was named for...	Ref · Catalog
279723 Wittenberg	1991 RM_{3}	Wittenberg, a town situated in Saxony-Anhalt, Germany. It was starting point of the Reformation, where Martin Luther posted his The Ninety-Five Theses in 1517.	JPL · 279723

== 279801–279900 ==
back to top

Named minor planet	Provisional	This minor planet was named for...	Ref · Catalog
There are no named minor planets in this number range

== 279901–280000 ==
back to top

Named minor planet	Provisional	This minor planet was named for...	Ref · Catalog
There are no named minor planets in this number range

back to top

Preceded by 278,001–279,000	Meanings of minor-planet names List of minor planets: 279,001–280,000	Succeeded by 280,001–281,000
