= List of minor planets: 279001–280000 =

The following is a partial list of minor planets, running from minor-planet number 279001 through 280000, inclusive. The primary data for this and other partial lists is based on JPL's "Small-Body Orbital Elements" and data available from the Minor Planet Center. Critical list information is also provided by the MPC, unless otherwise specified from Lowell Observatory. A detailed description of the table's columns and additional sources are given on the main page including a complete list of every page in this series, and a statistical break-up on the dynamical classification of minor planets.

Also see the summary list of all named bodies in numerical and alphabetical order, and the corresponding naming citations for the number range of this particular list. New namings may only be added to this list after official publication, as the preannouncement of names is condemned by the Working Group for Small Bodies Nomenclature of the International Astronomical Union.

Near-Earth obj.	MBA (inner)	MBA (outer)	Centaur
Mars-crosser	MBA (middle)	Jupiter trojan	Trans-Neptunian obj.
Unclassified

== 279001–279100 ==
Designation			Discovery			Properties		Ref
Permanent	Provisional	Named after	Date	Site	Discoverer(s)	Category	Diam.	Ref
279001	2008 UK_{249}	—	October 27, 2008	Kitt Peak	Spacewatch	·	3.2 km	MPC · JPL
279002	2008 UA_{256}	—	October 27, 2008	Kitt Peak	Spacewatch	KOR	1.5 km	MPC · JPL
279003	2008 UD_{256}	—	October 27, 2008	Kitt Peak	Spacewatch	VER	3.3 km	MPC · JPL
279004	2008 UO_{256}	—	October 27, 2008	Kitt Peak	Spacewatch	·	2.5 km	MPC · JPL
279005	2008 UQ_{256}	—	October 27, 2008	Kitt Peak	Spacewatch	·	2.2 km	MPC · JPL
279006	2008 UU_{260}	—	October 27, 2008	Mount Lemmon	Mount Lemmon Survey	·	2.6 km	MPC · JPL
279007	2008 UP_{274}	—	October 28, 2008	Kitt Peak	Spacewatch	·	1.3 km	MPC · JPL
279008	2008 UK_{277}	—	October 28, 2008	Mount Lemmon	Mount Lemmon Survey	·	4.0 km	MPC · JPL
279009	2008 UV_{279}	—	October 28, 2008	Mount Lemmon	Mount Lemmon Survey	·	2.5 km	MPC · JPL
279010	2008 UN_{281}	—	October 28, 2008	Kitt Peak	Spacewatch	·	3.8 km	MPC · JPL
279011	2008 UQ_{281}	—	October 28, 2008	Kitt Peak	Spacewatch	·	2.7 km	MPC · JPL
279012	2008 UU_{287}	—	October 28, 2008	Mount Lemmon	Mount Lemmon Survey	·	1.1 km	MPC · JPL
279013	2008 UX_{288}	—	October 28, 2008	Mount Lemmon	Mount Lemmon Survey	HOF	4.9 km	MPC · JPL
279014	2008 UZ_{288}	—	October 28, 2008	Mount Lemmon	Mount Lemmon Survey	KOR	1.7 km	MPC · JPL
279015	2008 UV_{290}	—	October 28, 2008	Kitt Peak	Spacewatch	·	3.2 km	MPC · JPL
279016	2008 UR_{291}	—	October 29, 2008	Kitt Peak	Spacewatch	·	3.7 km	MPC · JPL
279017	2008 UJ_{295}	—	October 29, 2008	Kitt Peak	Spacewatch	·	3.6 km	MPC · JPL
279018	2008 UP_{295}	—	October 29, 2008	Kitt Peak	Spacewatch	·	2.0 km	MPC · JPL
279019	2008 UJ_{307}	—	October 30, 2008	Catalina	CSS	·	1.7 km	MPC · JPL
279020	2008 UH_{331}	—	October 31, 2008	Mount Lemmon	Mount Lemmon Survey	·	2.1 km	MPC · JPL
279021	2008 UZ_{339}	—	October 23, 2008	Kitt Peak	Spacewatch	·	3.1 km	MPC · JPL
279022	2008 UA_{340}	—	October 23, 2008	Kitt Peak	Spacewatch	·	2.8 km	MPC · JPL
279023	2008 US_{351}	—	October 25, 2008	Socorro	LINEAR	·	3.6 km	MPC · JPL
279024	2008 UZ_{354}	—	October 30, 2008	Kitt Peak	Spacewatch	·	3.1 km	MPC · JPL
279025	2008 UT_{357}	—	October 24, 2008	Catalina	CSS	EUP	5.7 km	MPC · JPL
279026	2008 UY_{359}	—	October 28, 2008	Kitt Peak	Spacewatch	·	5.9 km	MPC · JPL
279027	2008 UJ_{360}	—	October 20, 2008	Kitt Peak	Spacewatch	·	3.0 km	MPC · JPL
279028	2008 UB_{362}	—	October 24, 2008	Catalina	CSS	·	3.7 km	MPC · JPL
279029	2008 UD_{364}	—	October 26, 2008	Catalina	CSS	·	7.7 km	MPC · JPL
279030	2008 UR_{365}	—	October 21, 2008	Kitt Peak	Spacewatch	HOF	3.3 km	MPC · JPL
279031	2008 UF_{368}	—	October 31, 2008	Socorro	LINEAR	(5)	1.6 km	MPC · JPL
279032	2008 UX_{368}	—	October 26, 2008	Mount Lemmon	Mount Lemmon Survey	·	2.8 km	MPC · JPL
279033	2008 UZ_{368}	—	October 26, 2008	Mount Lemmon	Mount Lemmon Survey	·	4.5 km	MPC · JPL
279034	2008 VQ_{3}	—	November 4, 2008	Nazaret	Muler, G.	·	1.8 km	MPC · JPL
279035 Mara	2008 VX_{4}	Mara	November 7, 2008	Nazaret	Muler, G., Ruiz, J. M.	·	2.5 km	MPC · JPL
279036	2008 VA_{13}	—	November 3, 2008	Mount Lemmon	Mount Lemmon Survey	TIR	2.8 km	MPC · JPL
279037 Utezimmer	2008 VU_{13}	Utezimmer	November 8, 2008	Tzec Maun	E. Schwab	·	2.2 km	MPC · JPL
279038	2008 VD_{20}	—	November 1, 2008	Mount Lemmon	Mount Lemmon Survey	·	2.2 km	MPC · JPL
279039	2008 VZ_{20}	—	November 1, 2008	Mount Lemmon	Mount Lemmon Survey	·	3.2 km	MPC · JPL
279040	2008 VD_{24}	—	November 1, 2008	Kitt Peak	Spacewatch	·	3.6 km	MPC · JPL
279041	2008 VS_{25}	—	November 2, 2008	Kitt Peak	Spacewatch	·	1.7 km	MPC · JPL
279042	2008 VH_{33}	—	November 2, 2008	Mount Lemmon	Mount Lemmon Survey	·	4.4 km	MPC · JPL
279043	2008 VT_{33}	—	November 2, 2008	Mount Lemmon	Mount Lemmon Survey	·	1.5 km	MPC · JPL
279044	2008 VD_{38}	—	November 2, 2008	Mount Lemmon	Mount Lemmon Survey	·	4.3 km	MPC · JPL
279045	2008 VZ_{42}	—	November 3, 2008	Kitt Peak	Spacewatch	·	1.1 km	MPC · JPL
279046	2008 VG_{50}	—	November 4, 2008	Catalina	CSS	·	2.8 km	MPC · JPL
279047	2008 VC_{51}	—	November 4, 2008	Kitt Peak	Spacewatch	·	4.0 km	MPC · JPL
279048	2008 VM_{54}	—	November 6, 2008	Mount Lemmon	Mount Lemmon Survey	·	780 m	MPC · JPL
279049	2008 VO_{58}	—	November 7, 2008	Kitt Peak	Spacewatch	·	4.7 km	MPC · JPL
279050	2008 VN_{59}	—	November 7, 2008	Catalina	CSS	·	1.3 km	MPC · JPL
279051	2008 VE_{64}	—	November 9, 2008	La Sagra	OAM	·	5.8 km	MPC · JPL
279052	2008 VE_{67}	—	November 7, 2008	Mount Lemmon	Mount Lemmon Survey	VER	4.7 km	MPC · JPL
279053	2008 VC_{75}	—	November 3, 2008	Catalina	CSS	·	1.3 km	MPC · JPL
279054	2008 VD_{77}	—	November 2, 2008	Mount Lemmon	Mount Lemmon Survey	·	2.5 km	MPC · JPL
279055	2008 VJ_{77}	—	November 3, 2008	Mount Lemmon	Mount Lemmon Survey	·	5.7 km	MPC · JPL
279056	2008 WY	—	November 17, 2008	Kitt Peak	Spacewatch	EOS	2.0 km	MPC · JPL
279057	2008 WK_{1}	—	November 17, 2008	Kitt Peak	Spacewatch	·	2.4 km	MPC · JPL
279058	2008 WU_{3}	—	November 17, 2008	Kitt Peak	Spacewatch	·	2.1 km	MPC · JPL
279059	2008 WT_{4}	—	November 17, 2008	Kitt Peak	Spacewatch	KOR	1.5 km	MPC · JPL
279060	2008 WB_{9}	—	November 17, 2008	Kitt Peak	Spacewatch	·	1.6 km	MPC · JPL
279061	2008 WJ_{10}	—	November 18, 2008	La Sagra	OAM	·	4.2 km	MPC · JPL
279062	2008 WG_{16}	—	November 17, 2008	Kitt Peak	Spacewatch	·	2.5 km	MPC · JPL
279063	2008 WW_{21}	—	November 18, 2008	La Sagra	OAM	EUN	1.9 km	MPC · JPL
279064	2008 WX_{21}	—	November 18, 2008	La Sagra	OAM	·	3.2 km	MPC · JPL
279065	2008 WE_{27}	—	November 19, 2008	Mount Lemmon	Mount Lemmon Survey	·	3.6 km	MPC · JPL
279066	2008 WU_{38}	—	November 17, 2008	Kitt Peak	Spacewatch	·	1.4 km	MPC · JPL
279067	2008 WF_{45}	—	November 17, 2008	Kitt Peak	Spacewatch	·	4.6 km	MPC · JPL
279068	2008 WM_{47}	—	November 17, 2008	Kitt Peak	Spacewatch	·	2.0 km	MPC · JPL
279069	2008 WH_{58}	—	November 20, 2008	Mount Lemmon	Mount Lemmon Survey	·	2.3 km	MPC · JPL
279070	2008 WV_{67}	—	November 18, 2008	Kitt Peak	Spacewatch	·	3.0 km	MPC · JPL
279071	2008 WV_{71}	—	November 19, 2008	Catalina	CSS	·	3.6 km	MPC · JPL
279072	2008 WX_{74}	—	November 20, 2008	Kitt Peak	Spacewatch	·	3.5 km	MPC · JPL
279073	2008 WK_{77}	—	November 20, 2008	Kitt Peak	Spacewatch	·	3.2 km	MPC · JPL
279074	2008 WX_{77}	—	November 20, 2008	Kitt Peak	Spacewatch	·	2.2 km	MPC · JPL
279075	2008 WU_{79}	—	November 20, 2008	Kitt Peak	Spacewatch	·	2.7 km	MPC · JPL
279076	2008 WM_{83}	—	November 20, 2008	Kitt Peak	Spacewatch	EOS	3.0 km	MPC · JPL
279077	2008 WG_{88}	—	November 21, 2008	Mount Lemmon	Mount Lemmon Survey	·	3.1 km	MPC · JPL
279078	2008 WP_{88}	—	November 21, 2008	Kitt Peak	Spacewatch	·	2.9 km	MPC · JPL
279079	2008 WF_{92}	—	November 24, 2008	Dauban	Kugel, F.	·	2.3 km	MPC · JPL
279080	2008 WM_{98}	—	November 19, 2008	Catalina	CSS	EOS	2.8 km	MPC · JPL
279081	2008 WG_{99}	—	November 24, 2008	Socorro	LINEAR	EOS	2.5 km	MPC · JPL
279082	2008 WC_{101}	—	November 25, 2008	La Sagra	OAM	CYB	4.7 km	MPC · JPL
279083	2008 WW_{102}	—	November 25, 2008	La Sagra	OAM	EOS	2.3 km	MPC · JPL
279084	2008 WD_{104}	—	November 30, 2008	Kitt Peak	Spacewatch	·	3.1 km	MPC · JPL
279085	2008 WW_{105}	—	November 28, 2008	La Sagra	OAM	URS	3.9 km	MPC · JPL
279086	2008 WB_{110}	—	November 30, 2008	Kitt Peak	Spacewatch	·	2.7 km	MPC · JPL
279087	2008 WQ_{110}	—	November 30, 2008	Kitt Peak	Spacewatch	·	2.9 km	MPC · JPL
279088	2008 WA_{116}	—	November 30, 2008	Kitt Peak	Spacewatch	EOS	2.9 km	MPC · JPL
279089	2008 WO_{130}	—	November 24, 2008	Catalina	CSS	·	3.6 km	MPC · JPL
279090	2008 WH_{131}	—	November 19, 2008	Goodricke-Pigott	R. A. Tucker	·	5.7 km	MPC · JPL
279091	2008 WL_{131}	—	November 13, 2002	Kitt Peak	Spacewatch	·	4.8 km	MPC · JPL
279092	2008 WW_{132}	—	November 26, 2008	La Sagra	OAM	EOS	2.9 km	MPC · JPL
279093	2008 WM_{136}	—	November 20, 2008	Kitt Peak	Spacewatch	·	3.9 km	MPC · JPL
279094	2008 WJ_{139}	—	November 30, 2008	Socorro	LINEAR	VER	6.0 km	MPC · JPL
279095	2008 WL_{139}	—	November 30, 2008	Socorro	LINEAR	·	5.0 km	MPC · JPL
279096	2008 XZ_{6}	—	December 6, 2008	Great Shefford	Birtwhistle, P.	·	3.5 km	MPC · JPL
279097	2008 XB_{9}	—	December 1, 2008	Mount Lemmon	Mount Lemmon Survey	·	2.3 km	MPC · JPL
279098	2008 XB_{11}	—	December 1, 2008	Catalina	CSS	·	1.8 km	MPC · JPL
279099	2008 YS_{26}	—	December 26, 2008	Dauban	Kugel, F.	ELF	4.1 km	MPC · JPL
279100	2008 YW_{30}	—	December 25, 2008	Bergisch Gladbach	W. Bickel	EUN	2.2 km	MPC · JPL

== 279101–279200 ==
back to top

Designation			Discovery			Properties		Ref
Permanent	Provisional	Named after	Date	Site	Discoverer(s)	Category	Diam.	Ref
279101	2008 YZ_{42}	—	December 29, 2008	Kitt Peak	Spacewatch	·	1.9 km	MPC · JPL
279102	2008 YC_{44}	—	December 29, 2008	Kitt Peak	Spacewatch	·	3.1 km	MPC · JPL
279103	2008 YN_{152}	—	December 29, 2008	Mount Lemmon	Mount Lemmon Survey	·	5.1 km	MPC · JPL
279104	2008 YA_{157}	—	December 21, 2008	Mount Lemmon	Mount Lemmon Survey	·	4.7 km	MPC · JPL
279105	2009 AO_{8}	—	January 1, 2009	Mount Lemmon	Mount Lemmon Survey	·	2.6 km	MPC · JPL
279106	2009 AU_{26}	—	January 2, 2009	Kitt Peak	Spacewatch	·	3.7 km	MPC · JPL
279107	2009 AB_{28}	—	January 3, 2009	Kitt Peak	Spacewatch	·	4.9 km	MPC · JPL
279108	2009 BM_{84}	—	January 25, 2009	Kitt Peak	Spacewatch	VER	6.5 km	MPC · JPL
279109	2009 BX_{150}	—	January 28, 2009	Catalina	CSS	·	5.0 km	MPC · JPL
279110	2009 CD_{37}	—	February 4, 2009	Kitt Peak	Spacewatch	HIL · 3:2	8.5 km	MPC · JPL
279111	2009 FX_{55}	—	March 18, 2009	Catalina	CSS	H	800 m	MPC · JPL
279112	2009 HG_{1}	—	April 16, 2009	Kitt Peak	Spacewatch	·	2.4 km	MPC · JPL
279113	2009 HE_{65}	—	April 23, 2009	Kitt Peak	Spacewatch	·	3.5 km	MPC · JPL
279114	2009 HM_{66}	—	April 23, 2009	Kitt Peak	Spacewatch	·	2.2 km	MPC · JPL
279115	2009 HA_{99}	—	April 21, 2009	Mount Lemmon	Mount Lemmon Survey	·	900 m	MPC · JPL
279116	2009 JK	—	May 2, 2009	La Sagra	OAM	·	2.4 km	MPC · JPL
279117	2009 KJ_{7}	—	May 26, 2009	Mayhill	Lowe, A.	·	2.6 km	MPC · JPL
279118	2009 MK_{9}	—	November 25, 2005	Catalina	CSS	EOS	2.6 km	MPC · JPL
279119 Khamatova	2009 OY_{1}	Khamatova	July 19, 2009	Zelenchukskaya Stn	T. V. Krjačko	V	890 m	MPC · JPL
279120	2009 ON_{10}	—	July 26, 2009	Siding Spring	SSS	·	1.9 km	MPC · JPL
279121	2009 OP_{22}	—	July 27, 2009	La Sagra	OAM	slow?	1.7 km	MPC · JPL
279122	2009 OO_{23}	—	July 27, 2009	Catalina	CSS	·	1.5 km	MPC · JPL
279123	2009 PS_{2}	—	August 12, 2009	Socorro	LINEAR	PHO	1.8 km	MPC · JPL
279124	2009 PV_{4}	—	August 15, 2009	La Sagra	OAM	PHO	1.5 km	MPC · JPL
279125	2009 PD_{7}	—	August 15, 2009	Kitt Peak	Spacewatch	·	1.4 km	MPC · JPL
279126	2009 PU_{16}	—	August 15, 2009	La Sagra	OAM	·	1.9 km	MPC · JPL
279127	2009 QT_{11}	—	August 16, 2009	La Sagra	OAM	·	790 m	MPC · JPL
279128	2009 QW_{15}	—	August 16, 2009	Kitt Peak	Spacewatch	V	720 m	MPC · JPL
279129	2009 QU_{29}	—	August 21, 2009	La Sagra	OAM	·	1.4 km	MPC · JPL
279130	2009 QO_{39}	—	August 20, 2009	Kitt Peak	Spacewatch	·	820 m	MPC · JPL
279131	2009 QU_{39}	—	August 21, 2009	Sandlot	G. Hug	·	1.1 km	MPC · JPL
279132	2009 QE_{45}	—	August 27, 2009	La Sagra	OAM	(2076)	940 m	MPC · JPL
279133	2009 QU_{51}	—	August 29, 2009	Catalina	CSS	·	760 m	MPC · JPL
279134	2009 RS_{6}	—	September 10, 2009	Catalina	CSS	V	830 m	MPC · JPL
279135	2009 RD_{8}	—	September 12, 2009	Kitt Peak	Spacewatch	·	1.9 km	MPC · JPL
279136	2009 RW_{16}	—	September 12, 2009	Kitt Peak	Spacewatch	·	680 m	MPC · JPL
279137	2009 RQ_{28}	—	September 13, 2009	Purple Mountain	PMO NEO Survey Program	·	1.6 km	MPC · JPL
279138	2009 RU_{28}	—	September 13, 2009	La Sagra	OAM	V	520 m	MPC · JPL
279139	2009 RL_{39}	—	September 15, 2009	Kitt Peak	Spacewatch	·	1.5 km	MPC · JPL
279140	2009 RA_{44}	—	September 15, 2009	Kitt Peak	Spacewatch	·	2.3 km	MPC · JPL
279141	2009 RO_{50}	—	September 15, 2009	Kitt Peak	Spacewatch	·	1.0 km	MPC · JPL
279142	2009 RW_{62}	—	October 27, 2005	Mount Lemmon	Mount Lemmon Survey	NEM	2.6 km	MPC · JPL
279143	2009 RB_{65}	—	September 15, 2009	Kitt Peak	Spacewatch	·	1.6 km	MPC · JPL
279144	2009 SW_{13}	—	September 16, 2009	Catalina	CSS	SYL · CYB	5.0 km	MPC · JPL
279145	2009 SA_{18}	—	September 20, 2009	Socorro	LINEAR	·	5.2 km	MPC · JPL
279146	2009 SS_{18}	—	September 17, 2009	Dauban	Kugel, F.	PHO	3.2 km	MPC · JPL
279147	2009 SR_{34}	—	September 16, 2009	Kitt Peak	Spacewatch	·	2.1 km	MPC · JPL
279148	2009 SQ_{36}	—	September 16, 2009	Kitt Peak	Spacewatch	·	3.7 km	MPC · JPL
279149	2009 SB_{38}	—	September 16, 2009	Kitt Peak	Spacewatch	(6769)	1.3 km	MPC · JPL
279150	2009 SL_{45}	—	September 16, 2009	Kitt Peak	Spacewatch	·	930 m	MPC · JPL
279151	2009 SD_{49}	—	September 17, 2009	La Sagra	OAM	·	3.6 km	MPC · JPL
279152	2009 SD_{70}	—	September 17, 2009	Mount Lemmon	Mount Lemmon Survey	·	820 m	MPC · JPL
279153	2009 SR_{73}	—	September 17, 2009	Mount Lemmon	Mount Lemmon Survey	·	1.0 km	MPC · JPL
279154	2009 SG_{74}	—	September 17, 2009	Kitt Peak	Spacewatch	·	4.1 km	MPC · JPL
279155	2009 SB_{79}	—	September 18, 2009	Kitt Peak	Spacewatch	·	1.9 km	MPC · JPL
279156	2009 SR_{90}	—	September 18, 2009	Mount Lemmon	Mount Lemmon Survey	·	770 m	MPC · JPL
279157	2009 SG_{113}	—	September 18, 2009	Kitt Peak	Spacewatch	·	1.2 km	MPC · JPL
279158	2009 SO_{123}	—	September 18, 2009	Kitt Peak	Spacewatch	·	780 m	MPC · JPL
279159	2009 SJ_{131}	—	September 18, 2009	Kitt Peak	Spacewatch	·	2.5 km	MPC · JPL
279160	2009 SU_{132}	—	September 18, 2009	Kitt Peak	Spacewatch	MAS	890 m	MPC · JPL
279161	2009 SV_{133}	—	September 18, 2009	Kitt Peak	Spacewatch	·	2.1 km	MPC · JPL
279162	2009 SM_{134}	—	September 18, 2009	Kitt Peak	Spacewatch	·	1.2 km	MPC · JPL
279163	2009 SX_{135}	—	September 18, 2009	Kitt Peak	Spacewatch	·	1.4 km	MPC · JPL
279164	2009 SJ_{146}	—	September 19, 2009	Kitt Peak	Spacewatch	·	1.2 km	MPC · JPL
279165	2009 SA_{147}	—	September 19, 2009	Kitt Peak	Spacewatch	·	2.1 km	MPC · JPL
279166	2009 SP_{156}	—	September 20, 2009	Kitt Peak	Spacewatch	V	620 m	MPC · JPL
279167	2009 SP_{160}	—	September 20, 2009	Kitt Peak	Spacewatch	·	2.4 km	MPC · JPL
279168	2009 SS_{160}	—	September 20, 2009	Kitt Peak	Spacewatch	·	1.5 km	MPC · JPL
279169	2009 ST_{166}	—	September 22, 2009	Kitt Peak	Spacewatch	GEF	1.2 km	MPC · JPL
279170	2009 SW_{204}	—	September 22, 2009	Kitt Peak	Spacewatch	NYS	880 m	MPC · JPL
279171	2009 ST_{215}	—	September 24, 2009	Kitt Peak	Spacewatch	·	900 m	MPC · JPL
279172	2009 SU_{241}	—	September 18, 2009	Catalina	CSS	MAR	1.5 km	MPC · JPL
279173	2009 ST_{257}	—	February 1, 2003	Haleakala	NEAT	NYS	1.3 km	MPC · JPL
279174	2009 SM_{265}	—	September 23, 2009	Mount Lemmon	Mount Lemmon Survey	·	1.2 km	MPC · JPL
279175	2009 SM_{274}	—	September 25, 2009	Kitt Peak	Spacewatch	·	1.1 km	MPC · JPL
279176	2009 SM_{277}	—	September 25, 2009	Kitt Peak	Spacewatch	·	2.0 km	MPC · JPL
279177	2009 SE_{281}	—	September 25, 2009	Kitt Peak	Spacewatch	NYS	1.2 km	MPC · JPL
279178	2009 SW_{281}	—	September 25, 2009	Kitt Peak	Spacewatch	·	1.6 km	MPC · JPL
279179	2009 SU_{289}	—	September 25, 2009	Kitt Peak	Spacewatch	·	710 m	MPC · JPL
279180	2009 SW_{290}	—	September 25, 2009	Kitt Peak	Spacewatch	·	980 m	MPC · JPL
279181	2009 SF_{300}	—	September 22, 2009	Mount Lemmon	Mount Lemmon Survey	·	2.9 km	MPC · JPL
279182	2009 SM_{336}	—	February 17, 2004	Kitt Peak	Spacewatch	·	770 m	MPC · JPL
279183	2009 SZ_{336}	—	September 24, 2009	Catalina	CSS	·	1.8 km	MPC · JPL
279184	2009 SG_{339}	—	September 27, 2009	Catalina	CSS	·	1.7 km	MPC · JPL
279185	2009 SS_{339}	—	September 22, 2009	Mount Lemmon	Mount Lemmon Survey	·	1.0 km	MPC · JPL
279186	2009 SD_{343}	—	September 17, 2009	Kitt Peak	Spacewatch	·	2.3 km	MPC · JPL
279187	2009 SB_{350}	—	September 20, 2009	Kitt Peak	Spacewatch	·	680 m	MPC · JPL
279188	2009 SF_{356}	—	September 20, 2009	Mount Lemmon	Mount Lemmon Survey	V	970 m	MPC · JPL
279189	2009 SG_{359}	—	September 22, 2009	La Sagra	OAM	·	1.7 km	MPC · JPL
279190	2009 SL_{360}	—	September 28, 2009	Mount Lemmon	Mount Lemmon Survey	EOS	4.3 km	MPC · JPL
279191	2009 SS_{361}	—	September 18, 2009	Kitt Peak	Spacewatch	·	2.8 km	MPC · JPL
279192	2009 TY_{2}	—	October 13, 2009	Mayhill	Lowe, A.	·	2.8 km	MPC · JPL
279193	2009 TE_{3}	—	October 10, 2009	La Sagra	OAM	·	1.1 km	MPC · JPL
279194	2009 TF_{3}	—	October 10, 2009	La Sagra	OAM	·	880 m	MPC · JPL
279195	2009 TV_{3}	—	October 9, 2009	Socorro	LINEAR	PHO	1.4 km	MPC · JPL
279196	2009 TG_{5}	—	October 11, 2009	La Sagra	OAM	·	1.5 km	MPC · JPL
279197	2009 TZ_{12}	—	October 10, 2009	Bisei SG Center	BATTeRS	·	760 m	MPC · JPL
279198	2009 TJ_{17}	—	October 15, 2009	La Sagra	OAM	HYG	4.9 km	MPC · JPL
279199	2009 TJ_{25}	—	October 14, 2009	Mount Lemmon	Mount Lemmon Survey	·	900 m	MPC · JPL
279200	2009 TU_{27}	—	October 15, 2009	La Sagra	OAM	·	3.1 km	MPC · JPL

== 279201–279300 ==
back to top

Designation			Discovery			Properties		Ref
Permanent	Provisional	Named after	Date	Site	Discoverer(s)	Category	Diam.	Ref
279201	2009 TF_{42}	—	October 2, 2009	Mount Lemmon	Mount Lemmon Survey	·	2.2 km	MPC · JPL
279202	2009 TO_{43}	—	October 12, 2009	Mount Lemmon	Mount Lemmon Survey	·	2.3 km	MPC · JPL
279203	2009 TM_{45}	—	October 15, 2009	Catalina	CSS	·	1.5 km	MPC · JPL
279204	2009 UM_{8}	—	March 24, 2003	Kitt Peak	Spacewatch	L4	10 km	MPC · JPL
279205	2009 UJ_{29}	—	October 18, 2009	Mount Lemmon	Mount Lemmon Survey	·	1.2 km	MPC · JPL
279206	2009 UP_{31}	—	October 18, 2009	Mount Lemmon	Mount Lemmon Survey	V	680 m	MPC · JPL
279207	2009 UW_{34}	—	October 21, 2009	Mount Lemmon	Mount Lemmon Survey	·	960 m	MPC · JPL
279208	2009 UQ_{35}	—	October 21, 2009	Mount Lemmon	Mount Lemmon Survey	slow	1.5 km	MPC · JPL
279209	2009 UB_{38}	—	October 22, 2009	Mount Lemmon	Mount Lemmon Survey	KOR	1.4 km	MPC · JPL
279210	2009 UW_{40}	—	January 18, 2007	Palomar	NEAT	·	1.4 km	MPC · JPL
279211	2009 UK_{41}	—	October 18, 2009	Mount Lemmon	Mount Lemmon Survey	·	2.1 km	MPC · JPL
279212	2009 UR_{43}	—	December 24, 2005	Kitt Peak	Spacewatch	AST	2.6 km	MPC · JPL
279213	2009 UP_{45}	—	October 18, 2009	Mount Lemmon	Mount Lemmon Survey	(1338) (FLO)	710 m	MPC · JPL
279214	2009 UV_{45}	—	October 18, 2009	Mount Lemmon	Mount Lemmon Survey	HOF	3.2 km	MPC · JPL
279215	2009 UY_{56}	—	October 23, 2009	Mount Lemmon	Mount Lemmon Survey	·	2.3 km	MPC · JPL
279216	2009 UQ_{69}	—	October 21, 2009	Catalina	CSS	·	4.1 km	MPC · JPL
279217	2009 UO_{71}	—	October 22, 2009	Catalina	CSS	·	1.5 km	MPC · JPL
279218	2009 UY_{72}	—	October 23, 2009	Mount Lemmon	Mount Lemmon Survey	·	1.8 km	MPC · JPL
279219	2009 UH_{83}	—	October 23, 2009	Mount Lemmon	Mount Lemmon Survey	·	1.1 km	MPC · JPL
279220	2009 UJ_{87}	—	October 24, 2009	Kitt Peak	Spacewatch	·	2.3 km	MPC · JPL
279221	2009 UY_{91}	—	October 25, 2009	BlackBird	Levin, K.	·	2.4 km	MPC · JPL
279222	2009 UC_{97}	—	October 22, 2009	Mount Lemmon	Mount Lemmon Survey	·	4.9 km	MPC · JPL
279223	2009 UP_{99}	—	January 18, 2004	Kitt Peak	Spacewatch	(883)	1.1 km	MPC · JPL
279224	2009 UU_{99}	—	October 23, 2009	Mount Lemmon	Mount Lemmon Survey	·	780 m	MPC · JPL
279225	2009 UL_{101}	—	October 23, 2009	Mount Lemmon	Mount Lemmon Survey	·	1.3 km	MPC · JPL
279226 Demisroussos	2009 UR_{103}	Demisroussos	October 24, 2009	Zelenchukskaya	T. V. Krjačko, B. Satovski	·	3.1 km	MPC · JPL
279227	2009 UZ_{104}	—	November 4, 2004	Kitt Peak	Spacewatch	·	3.6 km	MPC · JPL
279228	2009 UK_{109}	—	October 23, 2009	Kitt Peak	Spacewatch	(5)	1.3 km	MPC · JPL
279229	2009 UK_{121}	—	October 25, 2009	Kitt Peak	Spacewatch	·	1.2 km	MPC · JPL
279230	2009 UX_{122}	—	December 17, 2003	Kitt Peak	Spacewatch	·	670 m	MPC · JPL
279231	2009 UD_{128}	—	October 25, 2009	Kitt Peak	Spacewatch	·	2.2 km	MPC · JPL
279232	2009 UJ_{130}	—	October 26, 2009	Catalina	CSS	H	830 m	MPC · JPL
279233	2009 UT_{139}	—	October 27, 2009	Mount Lemmon	Mount Lemmon Survey	EOS	3.2 km	MPC · JPL
279234	2009 US_{144}	—	October 22, 2009	Catalina	CSS	(2076)	1.1 km	MPC · JPL
279235	2009 UF_{146}	—	October 23, 2009	Mount Lemmon	Mount Lemmon Survey	·	930 m	MPC · JPL
279236	2009 UA_{147}	—	October 24, 2009	Kitt Peak	Spacewatch	·	1.8 km	MPC · JPL
279237	2009 UT_{148}	—	October 23, 2009	Kitt Peak	Spacewatch	·	1.7 km	MPC · JPL
279238	2009 UZ_{150}	—	October 23, 2009	Kitt Peak	Spacewatch	(5)	1.6 km	MPC · JPL
279239	2009 UK_{152}	—	October 25, 2009	Mount Lemmon	Mount Lemmon Survey	T_{j} (2.99) · HIL · 3:2	5.7 km	MPC · JPL
279240	2009 VV	—	November 8, 2009	Mayhill	Mayhill	·	3.9 km	MPC · JPL
279241	2009 VD_{8}	—	November 8, 2009	Catalina	CSS	LIX	4.1 km	MPC · JPL
279242	2009 VL_{16}	—	November 8, 2009	Mount Lemmon	Mount Lemmon Survey	·	1.7 km	MPC · JPL
279243	2009 VD_{24}	—	April 25, 2003	Kitt Peak	Spacewatch	·	2.0 km	MPC · JPL
279244	2009 VN_{25}	—	November 11, 2009	Dauban	Kugel, F.	·	3.0 km	MPC · JPL
279245	2009 VU_{33}	—	November 10, 2009	Mount Lemmon	Mount Lemmon Survey	·	1.8 km	MPC · JPL
279246	2009 VH_{34}	—	November 10, 2009	Mount Lemmon	Mount Lemmon Survey	·	3.4 km	MPC · JPL
279247	2009 VZ_{35}	—	November 10, 2009	Mount Lemmon	Mount Lemmon Survey	·	3.7 km	MPC · JPL
279248	2009 VH_{38}	—	November 8, 2009	Mount Lemmon	Mount Lemmon Survey	·	1.3 km	MPC · JPL
279249	2009 VD_{39}	—	November 9, 2009	Mount Lemmon	Mount Lemmon Survey	·	1.7 km	MPC · JPL
279250	2009 VL_{40}	—	November 8, 2009	Catalina	CSS	·	4.4 km	MPC · JPL
279251	2009 VD_{42}	—	November 12, 2009	Needville	J. Dellinger, Eastman, M.	·	2.1 km	MPC · JPL
279252	2009 VU_{44}	—	November 14, 2009	Plana	Fratev, F.	·	860 m	MPC · JPL
279253	2009 VL_{45}	—	November 11, 2009	Socorro	LINEAR	HOF	3.5 km	MPC · JPL
279254	2009 VN_{46}	—	November 9, 2009	Catalina	CSS	·	2.2 km	MPC · JPL
279255	2009 VE_{47}	—	November 9, 2009	Mount Lemmon	Mount Lemmon Survey	·	1.2 km	MPC · JPL
279256	2009 VS_{48}	—	November 10, 2009	Kitt Peak	Spacewatch	BAR	1.4 km	MPC · JPL
279257	2009 VB_{52}	—	November 10, 2009	Kitt Peak	Spacewatch	·	3.7 km	MPC · JPL
279258	2009 VK_{56}	—	November 11, 2009	Mount Lemmon	Mount Lemmon Survey	·	1.3 km	MPC · JPL
279259	2009 VF_{62}	—	November 8, 2009	Kitt Peak	Spacewatch	(5)	1.1 km	MPC · JPL
279260	2009 VX_{65}	—	September 29, 2005	Kitt Peak	Spacewatch	·	1.5 km	MPC · JPL
279261	2009 VZ_{70}	—	August 1, 2000	Socorro	LINEAR	·	2.0 km	MPC · JPL
279262	2009 VX_{71}	—	November 11, 2009	Kitt Peak	Spacewatch	·	930 m	MPC · JPL
279263	2009 VP_{73}	—	November 11, 2009	Mount Lemmon	Mount Lemmon Survey	·	1.7 km	MPC · JPL
279264	2009 VK_{78}	—	November 9, 2009	Catalina	CSS	·	1 km	MPC · JPL
279265	2009 VJ_{86}	—	November 10, 2009	Kitt Peak	Spacewatch	3:2 · SHU	5.1 km	MPC · JPL
279266	2009 VY_{96}	—	November 8, 2009	Mount Lemmon	Mount Lemmon Survey	·	1.6 km	MPC · JPL
279267	2009 VF_{103}	—	November 11, 2009	Mount Lemmon	Mount Lemmon Survey	(5)	1.6 km	MPC · JPL
279268	2009 VX_{109}	—	November 9, 2009	Catalina	CSS	(5)	1.9 km	MPC · JPL
279269	2009 VS_{110}	—	November 10, 2009	Mount Lemmon	Mount Lemmon Survey	·	4.7 km	MPC · JPL
279270	2009 VY_{112}	—	November 9, 2009	Kitt Peak	Spacewatch	·	2.5 km	MPC · JPL
279271	2009 VR_{114}	—	November 11, 2009	Mount Lemmon	Mount Lemmon Survey	MRX	1.3 km	MPC · JPL
279272	2009 VV_{114}	—	November 8, 2009	Mount Lemmon	Mount Lemmon Survey	·	800 m	MPC · JPL
279273	2009 WF_{1}	—	November 17, 2009	Kachina	Hobart, J.	PHO	1.1 km	MPC · JPL
279274 Shurpakov	2009 WL_{8}	Shurpakov	November 19, 2009	Tzec Maun	Nevski, V.	·	2.3 km	MPC · JPL
279275	2009 WC_{9}	—	November 18, 2009	Socorro	LINEAR	·	2.1 km	MPC · JPL
279276	2009 WB_{14}	—	November 16, 2009	Mount Lemmon	Mount Lemmon Survey	·	760 m	MPC · JPL
279277	2009 WK_{15}	—	November 16, 2009	Mount Lemmon	Mount Lemmon Survey	·	850 m	MPC · JPL
279278	2009 WV_{28}	—	November 16, 2009	Kitt Peak	Spacewatch	EOS	2.7 km	MPC · JPL
279279	2009 WB_{29}	—	November 16, 2009	Kitt Peak	Spacewatch	·	3.4 km	MPC · JPL
279280	2009 WN_{29}	—	November 16, 2009	Mount Lemmon	Mount Lemmon Survey	·	1.8 km	MPC · JPL
279281	2009 WY_{32}	—	November 16, 2009	Kitt Peak	Spacewatch	·	1.2 km	MPC · JPL
279282	2009 WF_{35}	—	September 7, 2008	Mount Lemmon	Mount Lemmon Survey	L4	10 km	MPC · JPL
279283	2009 WS_{36}	—	November 17, 2009	Kitt Peak	Spacewatch	KOR	1.6 km	MPC · JPL
279284	2009 WT_{36}	—	December 12, 2006	Kitt Peak	Spacewatch	·	770 m	MPC · JPL
279285	2009 WW_{53}	—	November 17, 2009	Socorro	LINEAR	·	4.0 km	MPC · JPL
279286	2009 WY_{75}	—	November 18, 2009	Kitt Peak	Spacewatch	DOR	3.4 km	MPC · JPL
279287	2009 WC_{77}	—	November 18, 2009	Kitt Peak	Spacewatch	CYB	4.4 km	MPC · JPL
279288	2009 WU_{81}	—	November 18, 2009	La Sagra	OAM	·	2.6 km	MPC · JPL
279289	2009 WS_{99}	—	November 21, 2009	Kitt Peak	Spacewatch	·	3.3 km	MPC · JPL
279290	2009 WX_{101}	—	November 22, 2009	Kitt Peak	Spacewatch	·	2.8 km	MPC · JPL
279291	2009 WO_{104}	—	November 20, 2009	La Sagra	OAM	·	4.6 km	MPC · JPL
279292	2009 WS_{107}	—	November 17, 2009	Mount Lemmon	Mount Lemmon Survey	MAS	800 m	MPC · JPL
279293	2009 WW_{117}	—	November 20, 2009	Kitt Peak	Spacewatch	KOR	1.5 km	MPC · JPL
279294	2009 WT_{125}	—	November 20, 2009	Kitt Peak	Spacewatch	V	870 m	MPC · JPL
279295	2009 WB_{129}	—	January 7, 2006	Mount Lemmon	Mount Lemmon Survey	·	1.7 km	MPC · JPL
279296	2009 WL_{140}	—	November 18, 2009	Mount Lemmon	Mount Lemmon Survey	VER	3.6 km	MPC · JPL
279297	2009 WN_{142}	—	September 15, 2004	Kitt Peak	Spacewatch	(5)	1.8 km	MPC · JPL
279298	2009 WD_{155}	—	November 19, 2009	Catalina	CSS	·	2.6 km	MPC · JPL
279299	2009 WJ_{161}	—	November 21, 2009	Kitt Peak	Spacewatch	·	2.1 km	MPC · JPL
279300	2009 WN_{177}	—	November 23, 2009	Kitt Peak	Spacewatch	·	880 m	MPC · JPL

== 279301–279400 ==
back to top

Designation			Discovery			Properties		Ref
Permanent	Provisional	Named after	Date	Site	Discoverer(s)	Category	Diam.	Ref
279301	2009 WX_{179}	—	November 23, 2009	Kitt Peak	Spacewatch	·	2.6 km	MPC · JPL
279302	2009 WK_{183}	—	December 16, 1999	Kitt Peak	Spacewatch	·	1.9 km	MPC · JPL
279303	2009 WM_{186}	—	November 24, 2009	Mount Lemmon	Mount Lemmon Survey	MAR	1.3 km	MPC · JPL
279304	2009 WL_{191}	—	November 24, 2009	Mount Lemmon	Mount Lemmon Survey	·	2.1 km	MPC · JPL
279305	2009 WC_{194}	—	November 24, 2009	Kitt Peak	Spacewatch	(5)	1.7 km	MPC · JPL
279306	2009 WQ_{203}	—	November 16, 2009	Kitt Peak	Spacewatch	·	3.1 km	MPC · JPL
279307	2009 WO_{207}	—	November 17, 2009	Kitt Peak	Spacewatch	·	1.6 km	MPC · JPL
279308	2009 WM_{216}	—	November 20, 2009	Mount Lemmon	Mount Lemmon Survey	CYB	5.1 km	MPC · JPL
279309	2009 WM_{217}	—	February 23, 2007	Catalina	CSS	V	880 m	MPC · JPL
279310	2009 WQ_{248}	—	November 17, 2009	Mount Lemmon	Mount Lemmon Survey	·	2.4 km	MPC · JPL
279311	2009 WC_{252}	—	November 24, 2009	Kitt Peak	Spacewatch	·	4.2 km	MPC · JPL
279312	2009 WF_{259}	—	November 21, 2009	Mount Lemmon	Mount Lemmon Survey	·	2.5 km	MPC · JPL
279313	2009 WP_{260}	—	November 16, 2009	Mount Lemmon	Mount Lemmon Survey	·	1.4 km	MPC · JPL
279314	2009 WS_{261}	—	November 16, 2009	Socorro	LINEAR	·	3.1 km	MPC · JPL
279315	2009 WX_{261}	—	November 17, 2009	Kitt Peak	Spacewatch	·	3.0 km	MPC · JPL
279316	2009 WA_{262}	—	November 17, 2009	Mount Lemmon	Mount Lemmon Survey	·	2.7 km	MPC · JPL
279317	2009 XH_{1}	—	December 10, 2009	Mayhill	Mayhill	·	4.3 km	MPC · JPL
279318	2009 XC_{5}	—	December 10, 2009	Mount Lemmon	Mount Lemmon Survey	THM	2.7 km	MPC · JPL
279319	2009 XM_{6}	—	December 14, 2009	Mayhill	Lowe, A.	TIR	5.0 km	MPC · JPL
279320	2009 XZ_{9}	—	December 16, 2006	Mount Lemmon	Mount Lemmon Survey	·	870 m	MPC · JPL
279321	2009 XH_{11}	—	December 10, 2009	Mount Lemmon	Mount Lemmon Survey	MRX	1.6 km	MPC · JPL
279322	2009 XN_{13}	—	December 13, 2009	Mount Lemmon	Mount Lemmon Survey	EOS ·	4.4 km	MPC · JPL
279323	2009 XX_{14}	—	December 15, 2009	Mount Lemmon	Mount Lemmon Survey	·	5.1 km	MPC · JPL
279324	2009 XU_{16}	—	December 15, 2009	Mount Lemmon	Mount Lemmon Survey	·	2.8 km	MPC · JPL
279325	2009 XR_{18}	—	December 15, 2009	Mount Lemmon	Mount Lemmon Survey	·	2.2 km	MPC · JPL
279326	2009 XY_{18}	—	December 15, 2009	Mount Lemmon	Mount Lemmon Survey	V	810 m	MPC · JPL
279327	2009 XZ_{18}	—	December 15, 2009	Mount Lemmon	Mount Lemmon Survey	·	2.9 km	MPC · JPL
279328	2009 XA_{19}	—	December 15, 2009	Mount Lemmon	Mount Lemmon Survey	·	2.5 km	MPC · JPL
279329	2009 XC_{19}	—	December 15, 2009	Mount Lemmon	Mount Lemmon Survey	·	2.2 km	MPC · JPL
279330	2009 XR_{19}	—	December 15, 2009	Mount Lemmon	Mount Lemmon Survey	·	1.6 km	MPC · JPL
279331	2009 XT_{19}	—	December 15, 2009	Mount Lemmon	Mount Lemmon Survey	KOR	1.5 km	MPC · JPL
279332	2009 XY_{19}	—	December 15, 2009	Mount Lemmon	Mount Lemmon Survey	KOR	1.4 km	MPC · JPL
279333	2009 XZ_{19}	—	December 15, 2009	Mount Lemmon	Mount Lemmon Survey	·	1.8 km	MPC · JPL
279334	2009 XM_{24}	—	December 10, 2009	Mount Lemmon	Mount Lemmon Survey	KON	2.4 km	MPC · JPL
279335	2009 XA_{25}	—	December 15, 2009	Mount Lemmon	Mount Lemmon Survey	GEF	1.8 km	MPC · JPL
279336	2009 YL	—	December 17, 2009	Hibiscus	Teamo, N.	·	2.4 km	MPC · JPL
279337	2009 YK_{3}	—	December 17, 2009	Mount Lemmon	Mount Lemmon Survey	·	2.5 km	MPC · JPL
279338	2009 YX_{3}	—	December 17, 2009	Kitt Peak	Spacewatch	·	3.8 km	MPC · JPL
279339	2009 YG_{6}	—	December 18, 2009	Hibiscus	Teamo, N.	·	3.7 km	MPC · JPL
279340	2009 YM_{6}	—	December 17, 2009	Tzec Maun	D. Chestnov, A. Novichonok	·	2.4 km	MPC · JPL
279341	2009 YM_{7}	—	December 16, 2009	Kitt Peak	Spacewatch	·	1.4 km	MPC · JPL
279342	2009 YZ_{7}	—	December 16, 2009	Mount Lemmon	Mount Lemmon Survey	·	4.3 km	MPC · JPL
279343	2009 YZ_{9}	—	December 17, 2009	Mount Lemmon	Mount Lemmon Survey	·	3.1 km	MPC · JPL
279344	2009 YM_{13}	—	December 18, 2009	Mount Lemmon	Mount Lemmon Survey	·	2.7 km	MPC · JPL
279345	2009 YT_{13}	—	December 18, 2009	Mount Lemmon	Mount Lemmon Survey	EOS	2.6 km	MPC · JPL
279346	2009 YL_{19}	—	December 25, 2009	Kitt Peak	Spacewatch	·	2.2 km	MPC · JPL
279347	2009 YB_{20}	—	August 23, 2008	Siding Spring	SSS	·	2.5 km	MPC · JPL
279348	2009 YK_{22}	—	December 17, 2009	Kitt Peak	Spacewatch	·	4.4 km	MPC · JPL
279349	2010 AS_{3}	—	January 7, 2010	Bisei SG Center	BATTeRS	·	1.6 km	MPC · JPL
279350	2010 AW_{8}	—	January 6, 2010	Kitt Peak	Spacewatch	·	2.7 km	MPC · JPL
279351	2010 AP_{10}	—	January 6, 2010	Mount Lemmon	Mount Lemmon Survey	·	3.4 km	MPC · JPL
279352	2010 AN_{12}	—	January 6, 2010	Catalina	CSS	·	2.5 km	MPC · JPL
279353	2010 AV_{14}	—	January 7, 2010	Mount Lemmon	Mount Lemmon Survey	AGN	1.4 km	MPC · JPL
279354	2010 AE_{17}	—	January 7, 2010	Catalina	CSS	DOR	3.9 km	MPC · JPL
279355	2010 AL_{26}	—	January 6, 2010	Kitt Peak	Spacewatch	·	2.1 km	MPC · JPL
279356	2010 AL_{33}	—	January 7, 2010	Kitt Peak	Spacewatch	·	2.4 km	MPC · JPL
279357	2010 AS_{35}	—	January 7, 2010	Kitt Peak	Spacewatch	·	1.6 km	MPC · JPL
279358	2010 AL_{37}	—	January 7, 2010	Kitt Peak	Spacewatch	·	1.9 km	MPC · JPL
279359	2010 AO_{50}	—	January 8, 2010	Kitt Peak	Spacewatch	CYB	3.8 km	MPC · JPL
279360	2010 AZ_{55}	—	January 8, 2010	Kitt Peak	Spacewatch	·	3.6 km	MPC · JPL
279361	2010 AF_{59}	—	January 6, 2010	Catalina	CSS	·	2.0 km	MPC · JPL
279362	2010 AP_{59}	—	January 6, 2010	Catalina	CSS	·	2.4 km	MPC · JPL
279363	2010 AV_{59}	—	January 6, 2010	Catalina	CSS	·	2.7 km	MPC · JPL
279364	2010 AF_{60}	—	January 13, 2010	Hawkeye	Hawkeye	·	2.1 km	MPC · JPL
279365	2010 AK_{61}	—	January 10, 2010	Socorro	LINEAR	·	3.5 km	MPC · JPL
279366	2010 AU_{68}	—	December 20, 2009	Kitt Peak	Spacewatch	VER	3.8 km	MPC · JPL
279367	2010 AO_{72}	—	June 19, 2001	Palomar	NEAT	·	4.7 km	MPC · JPL
279368	2010 AR_{72}	—	January 13, 2010	Mount Lemmon	Mount Lemmon Survey	VER	3.5 km	MPC · JPL
279369	2010 AZ_{73}	—	January 15, 2010	Catalina	CSS	·	3.6 km	MPC · JPL
279370	2010 AC_{74}	—	January 15, 2010	Catalina	CSS	EUN	1.6 km	MPC · JPL
279371	2010 AT_{75}	—	January 10, 2010	Socorro	LINEAR	·	2.3 km	MPC · JPL
279372	2010 AZ_{77}	—	January 13, 2010	Bisei SG Center	BATTeRS	·	2.2 km	MPC · JPL
279373	2010 AU_{79}	—	January 13, 2010	Kitt Peak	Spacewatch	VER	4.1 km	MPC · JPL
279374	2010 AE_{80}	—	January 13, 2010	Mount Lemmon	Mount Lemmon Survey	HYG	4.0 km	MPC · JPL
279375	2010 AC_{81}	—	January 8, 2010	Kitt Peak	Spacewatch	·	3.8 km	MPC · JPL
279376	2010 BW_{101}	—	October 14, 2001	Kitt Peak	Spacewatch	3:2	4.2 km	MPC · JPL
279377 Lechmankiewicz	2010 CH_{1}	Lechmankiewicz	February 7, 2010	Westfield	Astronomical Research Observatory	EOS	3.3 km	MPC · JPL
279378	2010 CS_{2}	—	February 5, 2010	Kitt Peak	Spacewatch	·	3.3 km	MPC · JPL
279379	2010 CU_{4}	—	February 7, 2010	La Sagra	OAM	HYG	4.2 km	MPC · JPL
279380	2010 CL_{41}	—	May 9, 2006	Mount Lemmon	Mount Lemmon Survey	·	6.0 km	MPC · JPL
279381	2010 CD_{42}	—	February 6, 2010	Mount Lemmon	Mount Lemmon Survey	·	4.1 km	MPC · JPL
279382	2010 CO_{43}	—	February 5, 2010	Catalina	CSS	·	2.3 km	MPC · JPL
279383	2010 CM_{59}	—	February 14, 2010	Socorro	LINEAR	·	5.8 km	MPC · JPL
279384	2010 CB_{60}	—	February 14, 2010	Socorro	LINEAR	·	4.7 km	MPC · JPL
279385	2010 CG_{61}	—	February 9, 2010	Catalina	CSS	·	5.1 km	MPC · JPL
279386	2010 CP_{69}	—	February 13, 2010	Mount Lemmon	Mount Lemmon Survey	AGN	1.2 km	MPC · JPL
279387	2010 CA_{70}	—	February 13, 2010	Mount Lemmon	Mount Lemmon Survey	SYL · CYB	7.1 km	MPC · JPL
279388	2010 CK_{98}	—	February 14, 2010	Mount Lemmon	Mount Lemmon Survey	·	3.1 km	MPC · JPL
279389	2010 CA_{121}	—	February 15, 2010	Catalina	CSS	·	4.5 km	MPC · JPL
279390	2010 CW_{142}	—	February 9, 2010	Mount Lemmon	Mount Lemmon Survey	·	2.3 km	MPC · JPL
279391	2010 CN_{145}	—	February 14, 2010	Catalina	CSS	·	2.2 km	MPC · JPL
279392	2010 CB_{152}	—	February 14, 2010	Mount Lemmon	Mount Lemmon Survey	·	4.4 km	MPC · JPL
279393	2010 CE_{160}	—	February 5, 2010	Catalina	CSS	·	3.1 km	MPC · JPL
279394	2010 CX_{176}	—	February 10, 2010	Kitt Peak	Spacewatch	·	4.4 km	MPC · JPL
279395	2010 CU_{179}	—	February 13, 2010	Catalina	CSS	·	4.5 km	MPC · JPL
279396	2010 DK_{77}	—	February 17, 2010	Socorro	LINEAR	·	3.5 km	MPC · JPL
279397 Dombeck	2010 DN_{77}	Dombeck	February 16, 2010	Haleakala	Pan-STARRS 1	EOS	2.8 km	MPC · JPL
279398	2010 EW_{11}	—	March 4, 2010	Dauban	Kugel, F.	·	3.1 km	MPC · JPL
279399	2010 EF_{30}	—	March 5, 2010	Kitt Peak	Spacewatch	·	1.1 km	MPC · JPL
279400	2010 EK_{37}	—	March 12, 2010	Mount Lemmon	Mount Lemmon Survey	·	1.1 km	MPC · JPL

== 279401–279500 ==
back to top

Designation			Discovery			Properties		Ref
Permanent	Provisional	Named after	Date	Site	Discoverer(s)	Category	Diam.	Ref
279401	2010 EK_{38}	—	March 12, 2010	Kitt Peak	Spacewatch	·	2.0 km	MPC · JPL
279402	2010 EK_{41}	—	March 5, 2010	Kitt Peak	Spacewatch	DOR	3.3 km	MPC · JPL
279403	2010 EW_{44}	—	March 13, 2010	Dauban	Kugel, F.	·	3.8 km	MPC · JPL
279404	2010 EJ_{70}	—	March 12, 2010	Kitt Peak	Spacewatch	·	2.0 km	MPC · JPL
279405	2010 EZ_{83}	—	March 13, 2010	Catalina	CSS	·	5.1 km	MPC · JPL
279406	2010 EH_{87}	—	March 13, 2010	Kitt Peak	Spacewatch	ADE	3.6 km	MPC · JPL
279407	2010 EA_{105}	—	March 14, 2010	La Sagra	OAM	·	3.2 km	MPC · JPL
279408	2010 EO_{121}	—	March 15, 2010	Kitt Peak	Spacewatch	·	2.3 km	MPC · JPL
279409	2010 EZ_{124}	—	March 12, 2010	Catalina	CSS	·	2.6 km	MPC · JPL
279410 McCallon	2010 EF_{144}	McCallon	March 1, 2010	WISE	WISE	PHO	2.5 km	MPC · JPL
279411	2010 FM_{6}	—	March 16, 2010	Vallemare Borbona	V. S. Casulli	·	4.1 km	MPC · JPL
279412	2010 FN_{14}	—	March 17, 2010	Kitt Peak	Spacewatch	·	3.4 km	MPC · JPL
279413	2010 FH_{22}	—	March 18, 2010	Mount Lemmon	Mount Lemmon Survey	(2076)	1.3 km	MPC · JPL
279414	2010 FE_{101}	—	March 25, 2010	Kitt Peak	Spacewatch	HYG	3.1 km	MPC · JPL
279415	2010 GM_{6}	—	April 4, 2010	Vail-Jarnac	Jarnac	EMA	5.1 km	MPC · JPL
279416	2010 GR_{6}	—	April 1, 2010	WISE	WISE	·	1.5 km	MPC · JPL
279417	2010 GA_{29}	—	April 8, 2010	Kitt Peak	Spacewatch	·	940 m	MPC · JPL
279418	2010 GQ_{42}	—	March 12, 2005	Socorro	LINEAR	·	4.6 km	MPC · JPL
279419	2010 GX_{111}	—	April 9, 2010	Kitt Peak	Spacewatch	·	2.6 km	MPC · JPL
279420	2010 GC_{140}	—	April 7, 2010	Mount Lemmon	Mount Lemmon Survey	·	2.9 km	MPC · JPL
279421	2010 GR_{152}	—	September 4, 2007	Mount Lemmon	Mount Lemmon Survey	·	4.9 km	MPC · JPL
279422	2010 GX_{158}	—	April 5, 2010	Kitt Peak	Spacewatch	·	2.2 km	MPC · JPL
279423	2010 HS_{111}	—	April 19, 2010	WISE	WISE	·	5.2 km	MPC · JPL
279424	2010 JY_{151}	—	May 5, 2010	Mount Lemmon	Mount Lemmon Survey	·	3.2 km	MPC · JPL
279425	2010 KR_{118}	—	May 30, 2010	WISE	WISE	·	2.8 km	MPC · JPL
279426	2010 MU_{8}	—	June 16, 2010	WISE	WISE	·	1.3 km	MPC · JPL
279427	2010 MG_{28}	—	October 15, 2001	Palomar	NEAT	·	3.3 km	MPC · JPL
279428	2010 MX_{85}	—	March 10, 2008	Kitt Peak	Spacewatch	·	4.5 km	MPC · JPL
279429	2010 NY_{11}	—	October 28, 2005	Catalina	CSS	·	3.5 km	MPC · JPL
279430	2010 NY_{30}	—	November 9, 2005	Catalina	CSS	EOS	2.9 km	MPC · JPL
279431	2010 NL_{51}	—	November 21, 2005	Catalina	CSS	·	3.9 km	MPC · JPL
279432	2010 NF_{63}	—	July 11, 2010	WISE	WISE	·	2.7 km	MPC · JPL
279433	2010 NX_{68}	—	July 14, 2010	WISE	WISE	·	4.0 km	MPC · JPL
279434	2010 NA_{79}	—	December 19, 2003	Socorro	LINEAR	HIL · 3:2	7.3 km	MPC · JPL
279435	2010 NL_{111}	—	May 5, 2008	Mount Lemmon	Mount Lemmon Survey	T_{j} (2.96) · HIL · 3:2	5.7 km	MPC · JPL
279436	2010 NN_{112}	—	March 11, 2002	Palomar	NEAT	VER	5.9 km	MPC · JPL
279437	2010 OV_{10}	—	July 16, 2010	WISE	WISE	·	4.1 km	MPC · JPL
279438	2010 OO_{20}	—	July 18, 2010	WISE	WISE	·	4.0 km	MPC · JPL
279439	2010 OT_{33}	—	May 25, 2003	Kitt Peak	Spacewatch	·	4.3 km	MPC · JPL
279440	2010 OQ_{99}	—	April 5, 2003	Kitt Peak	Spacewatch	·	2.2 km	MPC · JPL
279441	2010 RO_{14}	—	July 25, 2003	Palomar	NEAT	·	850 m	MPC · JPL
279442	2010 RR_{14}	—	October 15, 2001	Palomar	NEAT	·	2.9 km	MPC · JPL
279443	2010 RZ_{45}	—	September 29, 1995	Kitt Peak	Spacewatch	·	1.6 km	MPC · JPL
279444	2010 RY_{46}	—	October 30, 2006	Mount Lemmon	Mount Lemmon Survey	EOS	2.2 km	MPC · JPL
279445	2010 RE_{51}	—	October 27, 2005	Catalina	CSS	EOS · fast	2.2 km	MPC · JPL
279446	2010 RM_{59}	—	November 16, 2003	Kitt Peak	Spacewatch	·	1.3 km	MPC · JPL
279447	2010 RA_{61}	—	September 7, 2004	Socorro	LINEAR	·	3.9 km	MPC · JPL
279448	2010 RK_{65}	—	August 19, 2006	Palomar	NEAT	·	1.8 km	MPC · JPL
279449	2010 RW_{69}	—	September 7, 2010	La Sagra	OAM	·	1.7 km	MPC · JPL
279450	2010 RP_{70}	—	September 24, 2000	Socorro	LINEAR	·	810 m	MPC · JPL
279451	2010 RC_{76}	—	September 11, 2010	La Sagra	OAM	NYS	2.1 km	MPC · JPL
279452	2010 RV_{77}	—	September 6, 2010	La Sagra	OAM	·	2.1 km	MPC · JPL
279453	2010 RX_{81}	—	September 23, 2005	Kitt Peak	Spacewatch	·	2.2 km	MPC · JPL
279454	2010 RV_{88}	—	September 13, 2004	Kitt Peak	Spacewatch	·	3.8 km	MPC · JPL
279455	2010 RF_{99}	—	October 2, 2006	Kitt Peak	Spacewatch	(5)	1.5 km	MPC · JPL
279456	2010 RX_{105}	—	August 13, 2004	Cerro Tololo	Deep Ecliptic Survey	HYG	2.7 km	MPC · JPL
279457	2010 RR_{112}	—	October 21, 2001	Kitt Peak	Spacewatch	·	2.6 km	MPC · JPL
279458	2010 RT_{114}	—	August 7, 2004	Palomar	NEAT	VER	3.4 km	MPC · JPL
279459	2010 RJ_{115}	—	November 22, 1997	Kitt Peak	Spacewatch	·	2.7 km	MPC · JPL
279460	2010 RA_{153}	—	February 16, 2007	Mount Lemmon	Mount Lemmon Survey	·	3.6 km	MPC · JPL
279461	2010 RO_{156}	—	February 12, 2002	Kitt Peak	Spacewatch	EOS	2.3 km	MPC · JPL
279462	2010 RJ_{179}	—	October 23, 2003	Kitt Peak	Spacewatch	NYS	1.2 km	MPC · JPL
279463	2010 SA_{38}	—	July 8, 2005	Kitt Peak	Spacewatch	GEF	1.6 km	MPC · JPL
279464	2010 TH_{160}	—	April 21, 2004	Kitt Peak	Spacewatch	·	2.6 km	MPC · JPL
279465	2010 TU_{165}	—	November 24, 2003	Kitt Peak	Spacewatch	V	750 m	MPC · JPL
279466	2010 UO_{6}	—	April 26, 2006	Mount Lemmon	Mount Lemmon Survey	PAL	2.1 km	MPC · JPL
279467	2010 UJ_{72}	—	February 16, 1996	Kitt Peak	Spacewatch	·	1.3 km	MPC · JPL
279468	2010 UR_{83}	—	November 21, 1993	Kitt Peak	Spacewatch	·	4.2 km	MPC · JPL
279469	2010 UW_{86}	—	August 10, 2004	Socorro	LINEAR	EOS	2.9 km	MPC · JPL
279470	2010 UJ_{95}	—	October 7, 2010	Catalina	CSS	·	2.5 km	MPC · JPL
279471	2010 VC_{23}	—	February 13, 2001	Kitt Peak	Spacewatch	·	3.2 km	MPC · JPL
279472	2010 VV_{26}	—	March 30, 2004	Kitt Peak	Spacewatch	·	2.2 km	MPC · JPL
279473	2010 VJ_{30}	—	December 19, 2003	Kitt Peak	Spacewatch	·	1.5 km	MPC · JPL
279474	2010 VX_{62}	—	July 3, 1995	Kitt Peak	Spacewatch	V	800 m	MPC · JPL
279475	2010 VC_{70}	—	September 17, 2006	Catalina	CSS	·	1.5 km	MPC · JPL
279476	2010 VP_{88}	—	December 18, 2003	Socorro	LINEAR	·	1.8 km	MPC · JPL
279477	2010 VU_{94}	—	June 20, 2005	Palomar	NEAT	·	1.8 km	MPC · JPL
279478	2010 VE_{112}	—	October 10, 1999	Socorro	LINEAR	V	780 m	MPC · JPL
279479	2010 VL_{194}	—	January 8, 2006	Mount Lemmon	Mount Lemmon Survey	·	2.9 km	MPC · JPL
279480	2010 VL_{198}	—	October 27, 2006	Mount Lemmon	Mount Lemmon Survey	·	1.5 km	MPC · JPL
279481	2010 WG_{10}	—	January 8, 2000	Kitt Peak	Spacewatch	·	4.3 km	MPC · JPL
279482	2010 WJ_{14}	—	September 29, 2005	Kitt Peak	Spacewatch	·	1.9 km	MPC · JPL
279483	2010 WW_{16}	—	December 15, 2006	Kitt Peak	Spacewatch	·	1.8 km	MPC · JPL
279484	2010 WJ_{29}	—	May 22, 2003	Kitt Peak	Spacewatch	EOS	2.4 km	MPC · JPL
279485	2010 XE_{4}	—	August 20, 2003	Palomar	NEAT	·	3.7 km	MPC · JPL
279486	2010 XM_{4}	—	December 15, 2003	Kitt Peak	Spacewatch	·	980 m	MPC · JPL
279487	2010 XT_{38}	—	October 1, 2009	Mount Lemmon	Mount Lemmon Survey	L4	14 km	MPC · JPL
279488	2010 XN_{46}	—	September 19, 2003	Kitt Peak	Spacewatch	·	780 m	MPC · JPL
279489	2010 XY_{49}	—	October 14, 2001	Apache Point	SDSS	·	1.9 km	MPC · JPL
279490	2010 XG_{57}	—	December 6, 2002	Socorro	LINEAR	·	2.3 km	MPC · JPL
279491	2010 YD_{2}	—	February 8, 2002	Anderson Mesa	LONEOS	·	3.0 km	MPC · JPL
279492	2011 AX_{5}	—	November 16, 2006	Mount Lemmon	Mount Lemmon Survey	EUN	1.8 km	MPC · JPL
279493	2011 AA_{11}	—	March 24, 2004	Anderson Mesa	LONEOS	NYS	1.4 km	MPC · JPL
279494	2011 AE_{15}	—	August 12, 2001	Haleakala	NEAT	·	4.4 km	MPC · JPL
279495	2011 AA_{16}	—	March 27, 2003	Kitt Peak	Spacewatch	·	1.4 km	MPC · JPL
279496	2011 AE_{19}	—	September 17, 2003	Kitt Peak	Spacewatch	·	3.8 km	MPC · JPL
279497	2011 AK_{23}	—	October 24, 2005	Mauna Kea	A. Boattini	·	3.2 km	MPC · JPL
279498	2011 AY_{28}	—	September 22, 2003	Palomar	NEAT	·	800 m	MPC · JPL
279499	2011 AU_{36}	—	September 20, 2003	Kitt Peak	Spacewatch	VER	2.6 km	MPC · JPL
279500	2011 AS_{42}	—	August 29, 2008	Punaauia	N. Teamo, S. F. Hönig	SYL · CYB	5.9 km	MPC · JPL

== 279501–279600 ==
back to top

Designation			Discovery			Properties		Ref
Permanent	Provisional	Named after	Date	Site	Discoverer(s)	Category	Diam.	Ref
279501	2011 AE_{43}	—	September 16, 2006	Catalina	CSS	·	900 m	MPC · JPL
279502	2011 AQ_{46}	—	December 9, 2006	Kitt Peak	Spacewatch	MAS	790 m	MPC · JPL
279503	2011 AW_{50}	—	February 27, 2000	Kitt Peak	Spacewatch	·	3.9 km	MPC · JPL
279504	2011 AC_{52}	—	January 7, 2000	Socorro	LINEAR	·	4.2 km	MPC · JPL
279505	2011 AD_{52}	—	October 24, 1998	Kitt Peak	Spacewatch	·	2.6 km	MPC · JPL
279506	2011 AQ_{55}	—	September 29, 1973	Palomar	C. J. van Houten, I. van Houten-Groeneveld, T. Gehrels	·	2.1 km	MPC · JPL
279507	2011 AL_{57}	—	July 4, 2005	Socorro	LINEAR	PHO	1.2 km	MPC · JPL
279508	2011 AO_{58}	—	February 7, 2002	Kitt Peak	Spacewatch	AGN	1.2 km	MPC · JPL
279509	2011 AH_{61}	—	October 5, 2004	Kitt Peak	Spacewatch	KOR	1.4 km	MPC · JPL
279510	2011 AZ_{70}	—	January 9, 2006	Mount Lemmon	Mount Lemmon Survey	EOS	3.0 km	MPC · JPL
279511	2011 AQ_{72}	—	April 25, 2003	Kitt Peak	Spacewatch	L4	10 km	MPC · JPL
279512	2011 AK_{74}	—	May 9, 2007	Kitt Peak	Spacewatch	·	4.3 km	MPC · JPL
279513	2011 AB_{77}	—	August 23, 2003	Palomar	NEAT	·	2.9 km	MPC · JPL
279514	2011 AO_{77}	—	May 31, 2003	Cerro Tololo	Deep Ecliptic Survey	·	2.4 km	MPC · JPL
279515	2011 BU_{3}	—	September 21, 2003	Kitt Peak	Spacewatch	·	3.6 km	MPC · JPL
279516	2011 BB_{7}	—	March 14, 2007	Kitt Peak	Spacewatch	·	2.5 km	MPC · JPL
279517	2011 BS_{9}	—	August 28, 2003	Palomar	NEAT	EOS	2.8 km	MPC · JPL
279518	2011 BD_{18}	—	January 20, 2002	Kitt Peak	Spacewatch	·	2.2 km	MPC · JPL
279519	2011 BB_{22}	—	October 30, 2005	Mount Lemmon	Mount Lemmon Survey	·	1.6 km	MPC · JPL
279520	2011 BZ_{24}	—	September 19, 2003	Palomar	NEAT	·	860 m	MPC · JPL
279521	2011 BW_{26}	—	December 24, 2006	Catalina	CSS	·	1.7 km	MPC · JPL
279522	2011 BG_{27}	—	January 6, 1998	Kitt Peak	Spacewatch	·	1.4 km	MPC · JPL
279523	2011 BK_{27}	—	December 18, 2004	Mount Lemmon	Mount Lemmon Survey	·	3.1 km	MPC · JPL
279524	2011 BZ_{27}	—	March 3, 2000	Socorro	LINEAR	·	1.4 km	MPC · JPL
279525	2011 BM_{33}	—	October 24, 2005	Mauna Kea	A. Boattini	·	2.1 km	MPC · JPL
279526	2011 BE_{51}	—	July 29, 2005	Palomar	NEAT	·	1.7 km	MPC · JPL
279527	2011 BJ_{51}	—	April 2, 2000	Anderson Mesa	LONEOS	·	1.5 km	MPC · JPL
279528	2011 BE_{52}	—	May 18, 2002	Kitt Peak	Spacewatch	EOS	2.5 km	MPC · JPL
279529	2011 BF_{52}	—	December 12, 2004	Kitt Peak	Spacewatch	·	3.7 km	MPC · JPL
279530	2011 BM_{52}	—	October 13, 2005	Kitt Peak	Spacewatch	·	1.4 km	MPC · JPL
279531	2011 BL_{53}	—	March 9, 2000	Kitt Peak	Spacewatch	THM	3.0 km	MPC · JPL
279532	2011 BG_{54}	—	October 9, 2004	Anderson Mesa	LONEOS	·	3.3 km	MPC · JPL
279533	2011 BA_{58}	—	March 12, 2007	Mount Lemmon	Mount Lemmon Survey	AEO	1.6 km	MPC · JPL
279534	2011 BT_{58}	—	September 7, 2004	Kitt Peak	Spacewatch	·	1.6 km	MPC · JPL
279535	2011 BQ_{60}	—	October 27, 1998	Kitt Peak	Spacewatch	·	1.3 km	MPC · JPL
279536	2011 CV	—	October 26, 1998	Xinglong	SCAP	V	1.0 km	MPC · JPL
279537	2011 CP_{6}	—	December 1, 2003	Kitt Peak	Spacewatch	·	810 m	MPC · JPL
279538	2011 CE_{7}	—	March 12, 2004	Palomar	NEAT	PHO	1.4 km	MPC · JPL
279539	2011 CM_{10}	—	April 22, 2007	Mount Lemmon	Mount Lemmon Survey	·	3.6 km	MPC · JPL
279540	2011 CJ_{16}	—	February 2, 2006	Kitt Peak	Spacewatch	EOS	2.3 km	MPC · JPL
279541	2011 CZ_{17}	—	March 29, 2000	Kitt Peak	Spacewatch	NYS	1.4 km	MPC · JPL
279542	2011 CR_{18}	—	July 30, 2008	Mount Lemmon	Mount Lemmon Survey	LIX	5.3 km	MPC · JPL
279543	2011 CZ_{22}	—	September 11, 2004	Kitt Peak	Spacewatch	PAD	1.7 km	MPC · JPL
279544	2011 CV_{23}	—	June 20, 1998	Caussols	ODAS	·	2.9 km	MPC · JPL
279545	2011 CU_{29}	—	March 13, 2004	Palomar	NEAT	·	1.6 km	MPC · JPL
279546	2011 CA_{34}	—	December 24, 2005	Kitt Peak	Spacewatch	HOF	3.4 km	MPC · JPL
279547	2011 CL_{34}	—	February 27, 2006	Kitt Peak	Spacewatch	·	2.6 km	MPC · JPL
279548	2011 CU_{34}	—	February 7, 2000	Kitt Peak	Spacewatch	·	1.4 km	MPC · JPL
279549	2011 CP_{39}	—	September 28, 2003	Anderson Mesa	LONEOS	EOS	2.9 km	MPC · JPL
279550	2011 CE_{42}	—	January 6, 2006	Mount Lemmon	Mount Lemmon Survey	·	1.9 km	MPC · JPL
279551	2011 CK_{42}	—	February 12, 2004	Palomar	NEAT	·	910 m	MPC · JPL
279552	2011 CD_{44}	—	September 30, 2003	Kitt Peak	Spacewatch	·	790 m	MPC · JPL
279553	2011 CF_{47}	—	December 1, 2005	Kitt Peak	Spacewatch	·	5.0 km	MPC · JPL
279554	2011 CX_{57}	—	January 27, 2006	Mount Lemmon	Mount Lemmon Survey	·	1.6 km	MPC · JPL
279555	2011 CT_{66}	—	November 26, 2005	Kitt Peak	Spacewatch	·	1.6 km	MPC · JPL
279556	2011 CU_{68}	—	April 19, 2007	Mount Lemmon	Mount Lemmon Survey	·	3.5 km	MPC · JPL
279557	2011 CZ_{68}	—	April 11, 2004	Catalina	CSS	V	900 m	MPC · JPL
279558	2011 CV_{72}	—	December 5, 1997	Kitt Peak	Spacewatch	EUN	2.0 km	MPC · JPL
279559	2011 CV_{74}	—	March 16, 2004	Kitt Peak	Spacewatch	·	1.2 km	MPC · JPL
279560	2011 CF_{77}	—	December 21, 2006	Kitt Peak	Spacewatch	·	1.4 km	MPC · JPL
279561	2011 CF_{78}	—	November 18, 2003	Kitt Peak	Spacewatch	EOS	2.5 km	MPC · JPL
279562	2011 CH_{78}	—	November 27, 2000	Kitt Peak	Spacewatch	·	2.1 km	MPC · JPL
279563	2011 DF_{1}	—	October 7, 2004	Kitt Peak	Spacewatch	AGN	1.5 km	MPC · JPL
279564	2011 DO_{1}	—	February 7, 2002	Kitt Peak	Spacewatch	WIT	1.2 km	MPC · JPL
279565	2011 DT_{1}	—	February 9, 2003	Haleakala	NEAT	T_{j} (2.97) · 3:2	7.4 km	MPC · JPL
279566	2011 DF_{3}	—	August 27, 2001	Kitt Peak	Spacewatch	·	1.3 km	MPC · JPL
279567	2011 DP_{4}	—	August 11, 2002	Palomar	NEAT	·	4.5 km	MPC · JPL
279568	2011 DG_{8}	—	September 6, 2008	Kitt Peak	Spacewatch	THM	2.7 km	MPC · JPL
279569	2011 DJ_{8}	—	December 27, 2005	Kitt Peak	Spacewatch	MRX	1.2 km	MPC · JPL
279570	2011 DN_{8}	—	April 12, 2002	Kitt Peak	Spacewatch	PAD	2.0 km	MPC · JPL
279571	2011 DN_{10}	—	January 18, 2004	Kitt Peak	Spacewatch	·	1.2 km	MPC · JPL
279572	2011 DU_{12}	—	September 24, 2008	Mount Lemmon	Mount Lemmon Survey	HYG	3.3 km	MPC · JPL
279573	2011 DZ_{12}	—	March 30, 2003	Anderson Mesa	LONEOS	·	1.9 km	MPC · JPL
279574	2011 DH_{14}	—	December 29, 2005	Mount Lemmon	Mount Lemmon Survey	·	2.0 km	MPC · JPL
279575	2011 DN_{15}	—	June 13, 2005	Mount Lemmon	Mount Lemmon Survey	·	660 m	MPC · JPL
279576	2011 DZ_{17}	—	September 22, 2003	Kitt Peak	Spacewatch	·	2.4 km	MPC · JPL
279577	2011 DY_{22}	—	October 24, 1981	Palomar	S. J. Bus	·	1.6 km	MPC · JPL
279578	2011 DF_{23}	—	March 16, 2004	Campo Imperatore	CINEOS	·	880 m	MPC · JPL
279579	2011 DG_{23}	—	September 12, 2004	Kitt Peak	Spacewatch	·	1.6 km	MPC · JPL
279580	2011 DJ_{23}	—	October 17, 1995	Kitt Peak	Spacewatch	·	2.3 km	MPC · JPL
279581	2011 DR_{23}	—	May 11, 2007	Mount Lemmon	Mount Lemmon Survey	HOF	3.0 km	MPC · JPL
279582	2011 DP_{28}	—	February 2, 2000	Kitt Peak	Spacewatch	·	1.3 km	MPC · JPL
279583	2011 DE_{42}	—	December 2, 2005	Kitt Peak	Spacewatch	·	1.5 km	MPC · JPL
279584	2011 DY_{46}	—	March 14, 2007	Kitt Peak	Spacewatch	·	1.9 km	MPC · JPL
279585	2011 DX_{49}	—	October 3, 2003	Kitt Peak	Spacewatch	LUT	5.0 km	MPC · JPL
279586	2011 EE	—	February 1, 1997	Kitt Peak	Spacewatch	PAD	2.3 km	MPC · JPL
279587	2011 EJ_{3}	—	December 20, 2009	Mount Lemmon	Mount Lemmon Survey	·	3.6 km	MPC · JPL
279588	2011 ER_{3}	—	February 9, 2005	Kitt Peak	Spacewatch	·	2.8 km	MPC · JPL
279589	2011 EB_{6}	—	March 14, 2004	Kitt Peak	Spacewatch	NYS	1.1 km	MPC · JPL
279590	2011 EO_{6}	—	July 30, 2000	Cerro Tololo	Deep Ecliptic Survey	·	1.2 km	MPC · JPL
279591	2011 EY_{6}	—	May 19, 2005	Mount Lemmon	Mount Lemmon Survey	·	780 m	MPC · JPL
279592	2011 EB_{8}	—	April 14, 2001	Kitt Peak	Spacewatch	·	830 m	MPC · JPL
279593	2011 EL_{8}	—	March 24, 2003	Kitt Peak	Spacewatch	·	1.2 km	MPC · JPL
279594	2011 ET_{9}	—	May 2, 2000	Socorro	LINEAR	V	900 m	MPC · JPL
279595	2011 EU_{9}	—	November 6, 1996	Kitt Peak	Spacewatch	·	1.1 km	MPC · JPL
279596	2011 EW_{9}	—	September 14, 2002	Palomar	NEAT	·	3.2 km	MPC · JPL
279597	2011 EE_{12}	—	September 14, 2007	Catalina	CSS	·	5.5 km	MPC · JPL
279598	2011 EL_{12}	—	April 28, 2000	Kitt Peak	Spacewatch	MAS	660 m	MPC · JPL
279599	2011 ER_{13}	—	January 20, 2002	Anderson Mesa	LONEOS	JUN	1.2 km	MPC · JPL
279600	2011 EA_{14}	—	December 15, 2004	Kitt Peak	Spacewatch	·	2.3 km	MPC · JPL

== 279601–279700 ==
back to top

Designation			Discovery			Properties		Ref
Permanent	Provisional	Named after	Date	Site	Discoverer(s)	Category	Diam.	Ref
279601	2011 ET_{16}	—	January 7, 2006	Kitt Peak	Spacewatch	·	2.4 km	MPC · JPL
279602	2011 EX_{17}	—	February 4, 2005	Palomar	NEAT	EUP	4.2 km	MPC · JPL
279603	2011 EU_{19}	—	March 11, 2004	Palomar	NEAT	(2076)	1.2 km	MPC · JPL
279604	2011 EQ_{21}	—	January 5, 2006	Mount Lemmon	Mount Lemmon Survey	·	1.7 km	MPC · JPL
279605	2011 EF_{24}	—	November 12, 2005	Kitt Peak	Spacewatch	·	1.5 km	MPC · JPL
279606	2011 ER_{24}	—	January 15, 1999	Kitt Peak	Spacewatch	·	3.4 km	MPC · JPL
279607	2011 EX_{24}	—	March 3, 2000	Socorro	LINEAR	·	3.4 km	MPC · JPL
279608	2011 EY_{24}	—	April 6, 2000	Socorro	LINEAR	·	3.5 km	MPC · JPL
279609	2011 EA_{25}	—	January 19, 2002	Anderson Mesa	LONEOS	·	2.2 km	MPC · JPL
279610	2011 EH_{25}	—	January 23, 2006	Catalina	CSS	·	2.8 km	MPC · JPL
279611	2011 EQ_{25}	—	January 22, 2007	Mount Nyukasa	Japan Aerospace Exploration Agency	·	1.4 km	MPC · JPL
279612	2011 EV_{25}	—	December 11, 2006	Kitt Peak	Spacewatch	·	1.4 km	MPC · JPL
279613	2011 ER_{26}	—	March 19, 2004	Socorro	LINEAR	·	860 m	MPC · JPL
279614	2011 EK_{30}	—	April 21, 1998	Socorro	LINEAR	·	870 m	MPC · JPL
279615	2011 EV_{36}	—	February 9, 2005	Kitt Peak	Spacewatch	·	3.9 km	MPC · JPL
279616	2011 ED_{37}	—	October 13, 2006	Kitt Peak	Spacewatch	·	660 m	MPC · JPL
279617	2011 EP_{37}	—	August 6, 2007	Lulin	LUSS	·	2.6 km	MPC · JPL
279618	2011 EH_{38}	—	October 19, 2003	Kitt Peak	Spacewatch	·	2.0 km	MPC · JPL
279619	2011 ED_{39}	—	January 27, 2007	Kitt Peak	Spacewatch	MAS	810 m	MPC · JPL
279620	2011 EH_{39}	—	March 3, 2005	Kitt Peak	Spacewatch	·	3.2 km	MPC · JPL
279621	2011 EW_{41}	—	January 28, 2007	Catalina	CSS	·	1.9 km	MPC · JPL
279622	2011 EX_{42}	—	January 9, 2002	Socorro	LINEAR	·	1.6 km	MPC · JPL
279623	2011 EF_{44}	—	December 31, 1994	Kitt Peak	Spacewatch	·	3.0 km	MPC · JPL
279624	2011 EH_{45}	—	February 11, 2004	Palomar	NEAT	·	780 m	MPC · JPL
279625	2011 EQ_{45}	—	November 16, 1999	Kitt Peak	Spacewatch	KOR	1.6 km	MPC · JPL
279626	2011 ET_{45}	—	February 14, 2005	Kitt Peak	Spacewatch	·	3.6 km	MPC · JPL
279627	2011 EA_{46}	—	April 13, 1996	Kitt Peak	Spacewatch	NYS	1.4 km	MPC · JPL
279628	2011 EN_{50}	—	October 21, 2003	Socorro	LINEAR	·	4.2 km	MPC · JPL
279629	2011 EG_{51}	—	May 6, 2002	Palomar	NEAT	·	2.8 km	MPC · JPL
279630	2011 EF_{53}	—	December 15, 2004	Kitt Peak	Spacewatch	·	3.0 km	MPC · JPL
279631	2011 EG_{53}	—	May 3, 2000	Kitt Peak	Spacewatch	·	2.2 km	MPC · JPL
279632	2011 ES_{66}	—	February 8, 2007	Mount Lemmon	Mount Lemmon Survey	·	1.5 km	MPC · JPL
279633	2011 EL_{68}	—	March 27, 2003	Kitt Peak	Spacewatch	·	1.3 km	MPC · JPL
279634	2011 EO_{68}	—	March 23, 2003	Kitt Peak	Spacewatch	·	1.1 km	MPC · JPL
279635	2011 EN_{69}	—	March 26, 2004	Kitt Peak	Spacewatch	·	1.1 km	MPC · JPL
279636	2011 EM_{70}	—	April 22, 2002	Kitt Peak	Spacewatch	·	3.1 km	MPC · JPL
279637	2011 EX_{70}	—	August 30, 2005	Kitt Peak	Spacewatch	·	1.6 km	MPC · JPL
279638	2011 EM_{71}	—	August 4, 2003	Socorro	LINEAR	·	2.0 km	MPC · JPL
279639	2011 EW_{72}	—	May 30, 2000	Kitt Peak	Spacewatch	V	650 m	MPC · JPL
279640	2011 EC_{73}	—	October 15, 1998	Caussols	ODAS	·	1.6 km	MPC · JPL
279641	2011 EG_{73}	—	December 18, 2004	Mount Lemmon	Mount Lemmon Survey	·	2.2 km	MPC · JPL
279642	2011 ES_{73}	—	February 21, 2007	Kitt Peak	Spacewatch	·	1.3 km	MPC · JPL
279643	2011 EH_{74}	—	November 6, 2005	Mount Lemmon	Mount Lemmon Survey	(5)	1.5 km	MPC · JPL
279644	2011 EM_{74}	—	September 17, 2003	Kitt Peak	Spacewatch	·	2.6 km	MPC · JPL
279645	2011 EF_{75}	—	March 27, 2000	Anderson Mesa	LONEOS	·	3.2 km	MPC · JPL
279646	2011 ER_{75}	—	September 21, 2008	Mount Lemmon	Mount Lemmon Survey	MRX	1.5 km	MPC · JPL
279647	2011 ET_{75}	—	September 28, 2003	Kitt Peak	Spacewatch	·	3.7 km	MPC · JPL
279648	2011 FR	—	April 19, 1998	Socorro	LINEAR	·	2.4 km	MPC · JPL
279649	2011 FS_{1}	—	August 29, 2002	Kitt Peak	Spacewatch	·	3.5 km	MPC · JPL
279650	2011 FT_{1}	—	March 11, 2007	Mount Lemmon	Mount Lemmon Survey	·	2.5 km	MPC · JPL
279651	2011 FB_{4}	—	February 2, 2006	Kitt Peak	Spacewatch	·	2.7 km	MPC · JPL
279652	2011 FJ_{4}	—	August 28, 2005	Kitt Peak	Spacewatch	·	910 m	MPC · JPL
279653	2011 FP_{4}	—	March 24, 2004	Bergisch Gladbach	W. Bickel	·	1.1 km	MPC · JPL
279654	2011 FU_{5}	—	May 11, 2000	Anderson Mesa	LONEOS	ERI	2.0 km	MPC · JPL
279655	2011 FB_{7}	—	January 31, 2006	Kitt Peak	Spacewatch	·	2.0 km	MPC · JPL
279656	2011 FT_{7}	—	March 1, 2005	Catalina	CSS	T_{j} (2.99) · EUP	4.7 km	MPC · JPL
279657	2011 FP_{9}	—	February 1, 2000	Kitt Peak	Spacewatch	·	2.8 km	MPC · JPL
279658	2011 FC_{10}	—	December 1, 2006	Mount Lemmon	Mount Lemmon Survey	·	1.4 km	MPC · JPL
279659	2011 FS_{10}	—	November 16, 2006	Kitt Peak	Spacewatch	·	1.0 km	MPC · JPL
279660	2011 FX_{10}	—	March 24, 2006	Mount Lemmon	Mount Lemmon Survey	MRX	1.3 km	MPC · JPL
279661	2011 FA_{11}	—	November 3, 2005	Kitt Peak	Spacewatch	NYS	1.2 km	MPC · JPL
279662	2011 FB_{11}	—	May 10, 2003	Kitt Peak	Spacewatch	·	1.6 km	MPC · JPL
279663	2011 FK_{11}	—	October 15, 2004	Mount Lemmon	Mount Lemmon Survey	MRX	1.2 km	MPC · JPL
279664	2011 FO_{11}	—	December 15, 2004	Kitt Peak	Spacewatch	·	1.9 km	MPC · JPL
279665	2011 FC_{12}	—	February 27, 2000	Kitt Peak	Spacewatch	·	3.1 km	MPC · JPL
279666	2011 FV_{17}	—	March 2, 2001	Kitt Peak	Spacewatch	·	2.4 km	MPC · JPL
279667	2011 FD_{18}	—	September 17, 2004	Kitt Peak	Spacewatch	·	990 m	MPC · JPL
279668	2011 FP_{18}	—	December 3, 2005	Kitt Peak	Spacewatch	·	1.6 km	MPC · JPL
279669	2011 FJ_{22}	—	March 11, 2002	Palomar	NEAT	·	1.5 km	MPC · JPL
279670	2011 FK_{23}	—	February 25, 2007	Mount Lemmon	Mount Lemmon Survey	V	720 m	MPC · JPL
279671	2011 FZ_{23}	—	April 5, 2000	Socorro	LINEAR	MAS	790 m	MPC · JPL
279672	2011 FE_{28}	—	December 11, 2004	Kitt Peak	Spacewatch	·	5.3 km	MPC · JPL
279673	2011 FA_{29}	—	February 25, 2007	Mount Lemmon	Mount Lemmon Survey	(194)	2.2 km	MPC · JPL
279674	2011 FU_{29}	—	December 17, 2003	Kitt Peak	Spacewatch	·	4.0 km	MPC · JPL
279675	2011 FM_{30}	—	August 10, 2007	Kitt Peak	Spacewatch	·	3.2 km	MPC · JPL
279676	2011 FE_{31}	—	October 10, 2002	Palomar	NEAT	·	2.2 km	MPC · JPL
279677	2011 FT_{31}	—	October 1, 1999	Kitt Peak	Spacewatch	·	2.9 km	MPC · JPL
279678	2011 FP_{32}	—	January 7, 2006	Mount Lemmon	Mount Lemmon Survey	AGN	1.6 km	MPC · JPL
279679	2011 FQ_{32}	—	September 22, 2008	Kitt Peak	Spacewatch	·	2.8 km	MPC · JPL
279680	2011 FR_{32}	—	December 17, 2001	Socorro	LINEAR	·	1.2 km	MPC · JPL
279681	2011 FV_{32}	—	February 29, 2004	Kitt Peak	Spacewatch	·	750 m	MPC · JPL
279682	2011 FY_{32}	—	August 31, 2005	Palomar	NEAT	·	1.2 km	MPC · JPL
279683	2011 FM_{33}	—	October 31, 2005	Kitt Peak	Spacewatch	·	1.3 km	MPC · JPL
279684	2011 FO_{34}	—	May 10, 2007	Mount Lemmon	Mount Lemmon Survey	·	2.0 km	MPC · JPL
279685	2011 FZ_{34}	—	October 30, 2002	Apache Point	SDSS	·	2.8 km	MPC · JPL
279686	2011 FN_{36}	—	February 16, 2004	Kitt Peak	Spacewatch	·	840 m	MPC · JPL
279687	2011 FQ_{36}	—	April 15, 2004	Anderson Mesa	LONEOS	·	1.4 km	MPC · JPL
279688	2011 FS_{37}	—	December 21, 2003	Kitt Peak	Spacewatch	·	1.1 km	MPC · JPL
279689	2011 FT_{40}	—	January 9, 2006	Mount Lemmon	Mount Lemmon Survey	AGN	1.5 km	MPC · JPL
279690	2011 FB_{41}	—	March 11, 2007	Catalina	CSS	·	1.6 km	MPC · JPL
279691	2011 FN_{42}	—	November 30, 1999	Kitt Peak	Spacewatch	·	860 m	MPC · JPL
279692	2011 FQ_{43}	—	July 19, 2001	Palomar	NEAT	LIX	4.5 km	MPC · JPL
279693	2011 FD_{44}	—	March 4, 2005	Kitt Peak	Spacewatch	HYG	3.8 km	MPC · JPL
279694	2011 FO_{45}	—	February 2, 2005	Kitt Peak	Spacewatch	·	1.9 km	MPC · JPL
279695	2011 FX_{46}	—	March 17, 2005	Mount Lemmon	Mount Lemmon Survey	·	4.5 km	MPC · JPL
279696	2011 FF_{47}	—	November 16, 2006	Mount Lemmon	Mount Lemmon Survey	·	790 m	MPC · JPL
279697	2011 FQ_{55}	—	February 3, 2002	Palomar	NEAT	·	1.7 km	MPC · JPL
279698	2011 FA_{56}	—	September 20, 1995	Kitt Peak	Spacewatch	·	1.9 km	MPC · JPL
279699	2011 FK_{56}	—	May 26, 2003	Kitt Peak	Spacewatch	·	2.0 km	MPC · JPL
279700	2011 FN_{65}	—	September 7, 2008	Mount Lemmon	Mount Lemmon Survey	·	1.9 km	MPC · JPL

== 279701–279800 ==
back to top

Designation			Discovery			Properties		Ref
Permanent	Provisional	Named after	Date	Site	Discoverer(s)	Category	Diam.	Ref
279701	2011 FC_{83}	—	September 17, 1998	Kitt Peak	Spacewatch	·	700 m	MPC · JPL
279702	2011 FN_{88}	—	August 22, 2003	Palomar	NEAT	HOF	3.1 km	MPC · JPL
279703	2011 FO_{92}	—	March 6, 2002	Palomar	NEAT	·	2.9 km	MPC · JPL
279704	2011 FS_{140}	—	April 27, 2000	Kitt Peak	Spacewatch	·	3.4 km	MPC · JPL
279705	2011 FB_{142}	—	April 11, 2002	Socorro	LINEAR	·	2.3 km	MPC · JPL
279706	2011 FY_{149}	—	October 24, 2003	Kitt Peak	Spacewatch	EOS	2.7 km	MPC · JPL
279707	2011 FE_{150}	—	May 9, 2006	Mount Lemmon	Mount Lemmon Survey	·	4.0 km	MPC · JPL
279708	2011 GN_{3}	—	December 27, 2005	Kitt Peak	Spacewatch	(5)	1.7 km	MPC · JPL
279709	2011 GH_{4}	—	September 28, 2000	Kitt Peak	Spacewatch	·	1.5 km	MPC · JPL
279710	2011 GK_{12}	—	February 2, 2006	Kitt Peak	Spacewatch	AGN	1.2 km	MPC · JPL
279711	2011 GJ_{31}	—	April 22, 2004	Socorro	LINEAR	NYS	1.0 km	MPC · JPL
279712	2011 GY_{46}	—	December 11, 2004	Catalina	CSS	·	2.9 km	MPC · JPL
279713	2011 GB_{47}	—	January 6, 2006	Kitt Peak	Spacewatch	·	1.2 km	MPC · JPL
279714	2011 GG_{48}	—	January 31, 2006	Mount Lemmon	Mount Lemmon Survey	·	1.4 km	MPC · JPL
279715	2011 GD_{55}	—	February 2, 2006	Mount Lemmon	Mount Lemmon Survey	AGN	1.7 km	MPC · JPL
279716	2011 GJ_{57}	—	October 24, 2001	Palomar	NEAT	CYB	6.2 km	MPC · JPL
279717	2011 GK_{59}	—	March 11, 2005	Mayhill	Lowe, A.	·	5.6 km	MPC · JPL
279718	1579 T-2	—	September 24, 1973	Palomar	C. J. van Houten, I. van Houten-Groeneveld, T. Gehrels	·	740 m	MPC · JPL
279719	5449 T-2	—	September 30, 1973	Palomar	C. J. van Houten, I. van Houten-Groeneveld, T. Gehrels	·	2.6 km	MPC · JPL
279720	5475 T-2	—	September 30, 1973	Palomar	C. J. van Houten, I. van Houten-Groeneveld, T. Gehrels	·	2.5 km	MPC · JPL
279721	1172 T-3	—	October 17, 1977	Palomar	C. J. van Houten, I. van Houten-Groeneveld, T. Gehrels	·	3.3 km	MPC · JPL
279722	5741 T-3	—	October 16, 1977	Palomar	C. J. van Houten, I. van Houten-Groeneveld, T. Gehrels	·	2.5 km	MPC · JPL
279723 Wittenberg	1991 RM_{3}	Wittenberg	September 12, 1991	Tautenburg	F. Börngen, L. D. Schmadel	·	1.6 km	MPC · JPL
279724	1991 RL_{28}	—	September 8, 1991	Kitt Peak	Spacewatch	·	1.4 km	MPC · JPL
279725	1993 DZ_{1}	—	February 26, 1993	Kitt Peak	Spacewatch	·	920 m	MPC · JPL
279726	1993 TG_{30}	—	October 9, 1993	La Silla	E. W. Elst	·	3.5 km	MPC · JPL
279727	1994 HH	—	April 16, 1994	Kitt Peak	Spacewatch	·	1.5 km	MPC · JPL
279728	1994 SM_{1}	—	September 27, 1994	Kitt Peak	Spacewatch	·	1.4 km	MPC · JPL
279729	1995 HU_{1}	—	April 24, 1995	Kitt Peak	Spacewatch	·	1.3 km	MPC · JPL
279730	1995 MA_{6}	—	June 24, 1995	Kitt Peak	Spacewatch	·	1.1 km	MPC · JPL
279731	1995 OC_{9}	—	July 27, 1995	Kitt Peak	Spacewatch	·	2.4 km	MPC · JPL
279732	1995 UC_{66}	—	October 17, 1995	Kitt Peak	Spacewatch	·	1.6 km	MPC · JPL
279733	1995 UZ_{78}	—	October 23, 1995	Kitt Peak	Spacewatch	·	810 m	MPC · JPL
279734	1995 VC_{10}	—	November 15, 1995	Kitt Peak	Spacewatch	·	1.7 km	MPC · JPL
279735	1995 WB_{13}	—	November 16, 1995	Kitt Peak	Spacewatch	AEO	1.2 km	MPC · JPL
279736	1995 WF_{13}	—	November 16, 1995	Kitt Peak	Spacewatch	·	2.8 km	MPC · JPL
279737	1996 UO_{3}	—	October 18, 1996	Kitt Peak	Spacewatch	EOS	2.3 km	MPC · JPL
279738	1997 AW_{9}	—	January 3, 1997	Kitt Peak	Spacewatch	·	2.3 km	MPC · JPL
279739	1997 EF_{1}	—	March 3, 1997	Kitt Peak	Spacewatch	LIX	4.8 km	MPC · JPL
279740	1998 BO_{6}	—	January 23, 1998	Kitt Peak	Spacewatch	·	1.1 km	MPC · JPL
279741	1998 FL_{10}	—	March 24, 1998	Caussols	ODAS	·	1.9 km	MPC · JPL
279742	1998 HG_{29}	—	April 20, 1998	Socorro	LINEAR	·	840 m	MPC · JPL
279743	1998 HE_{50}	—	April 28, 1998	Kitt Peak	Spacewatch	·	1.4 km	MPC · JPL
279744	1998 KM_{3}	—	May 24, 1998	Socorro	LINEAR	APO · PHA	380 m	MPC · JPL
279745	1998 KG_{39}	—	May 22, 1998	Socorro	LINEAR	EUN	1.9 km	MPC · JPL
279746	1998 MK_{6}	—	June 20, 1998	Kitt Peak	Spacewatch	·	2.8 km	MPC · JPL
279747	1998 QA_{58}	—	August 30, 1998	Kitt Peak	Spacewatch	AGN	1.3 km	MPC · JPL
279748	1998 QH_{100}	—	August 26, 1998	La Silla	E. W. Elst	·	3.2 km	MPC · JPL
279749	1998 RH_{20}	—	September 14, 1998	Socorro	LINEAR	·	2.8 km	MPC · JPL
279750	1998 SL	—	September 16, 1998	Kitt Peak	Spacewatch	·	860 m	MPC · JPL
279751	1998 ST_{8}	—	September 20, 1998	Kitt Peak	Spacewatch	·	910 m	MPC · JPL
279752	1998 SB_{68}	—	September 19, 1998	Socorro	LINEAR	·	2.7 km	MPC · JPL
279753	1998 SE_{87}	—	September 26, 1998	Socorro	LINEAR	·	3.9 km	MPC · JPL
279754	1998 UB_{18}	—	October 19, 1998	Xinglong	SCAP	·	1.3 km	MPC · JPL
279755	1998 WS_{27}	—	November 18, 1998	Kitt Peak	Spacewatch	V	850 m	MPC · JPL
279756	1998 WE_{42}	—	November 19, 1998	Caussols	ODAS	MRX	1.3 km	MPC · JPL
279757	1998 XF_{20}	—	December 10, 1998	Kitt Peak	Spacewatch	KOR	1.9 km	MPC · JPL
279758	1999 CL_{137}	—	February 9, 1999	Kitt Peak	Spacewatch	·	1.3 km	MPC · JPL
279759	1999 CZ_{140}	—	February 9, 1999	Kitt Peak	Spacewatch	·	3.4 km	MPC · JPL
279760	1999 EB_{2}	—	March 9, 1999	Kitt Peak	Spacewatch	·	3.3 km	MPC · JPL
279761	1999 FL_{67}	—	March 20, 1999	Apache Point	SDSS	·	3.0 km	MPC · JPL
279762	1999 FV_{83}	—	March 20, 1999	Apache Point	SDSS	·	1.5 km	MPC · JPL
279763	1999 GQ_{1}	—	April 6, 1999	Kitt Peak	Spacewatch	·	1.5 km	MPC · JPL
279764	1999 NB_{59}	—	July 13, 1999	Socorro	LINEAR	·	2.1 km	MPC · JPL
279765	1999 RH_{2}	—	September 5, 1999	Kitt Peak	Spacewatch	·	1.4 km	MPC · JPL
279766	1999 RE_{3}	—	September 6, 1999	Višnjan	K. Korlević	·	1.8 km	MPC · JPL
279767	1999 RT_{56}	—	September 7, 1999	Socorro	LINEAR	·	1.9 km	MPC · JPL
279768	1999 RH_{104}	—	September 8, 1999	Socorro	LINEAR	·	750 m	MPC · JPL
279769	1999 RG_{114}	—	September 13, 1999	Kitt Peak	Spacewatch	·	3.4 km	MPC · JPL
279770	1999 RN_{146}	—	September 9, 1999	Socorro	LINEAR	(5)	1.7 km	MPC · JPL
279771	1999 RO_{146}	—	September 9, 1999	Socorro	LINEAR	·	1.4 km	MPC · JPL
279772	1999 TO_{24}	—	October 4, 1999	Kitt Peak	Spacewatch	·	1.9 km	MPC · JPL
279773	1999 TV_{60}	—	October 7, 1999	Kitt Peak	Spacewatch	·	1.6 km	MPC · JPL
279774	1999 TL_{61}	—	October 7, 1999	Kitt Peak	Spacewatch	·	2.1 km	MPC · JPL
279775	1999 TO_{79}	—	October 11, 1999	Kitt Peak	Spacewatch	·	1.7 km	MPC · JPL
279776	1999 TA_{122}	—	October 4, 1999	Socorro	LINEAR	·	1.3 km	MPC · JPL
279777	1999 TT_{144}	—	October 7, 1999	Socorro	LINEAR	·	2.0 km	MPC · JPL
279778	1999 TD_{196}	—	October 12, 1999	Socorro	LINEAR	·	3.9 km	MPC · JPL
279779	1999 TX_{205}	—	October 13, 1999	Socorro	LINEAR	·	1.8 km	MPC · JPL
279780	1999 TJ_{208}	—	October 14, 1999	Socorro	LINEAR	·	2.2 km	MPC · JPL
279781	1999 TA_{220}	—	October 1, 1999	Catalina	CSS	·	3.5 km	MPC · JPL
279782	1999 TM_{225}	—	October 2, 1999	Kitt Peak	Spacewatch	·	1.9 km	MPC · JPL
279783	1999 TP_{266}	—	October 3, 1999	Socorro	LINEAR	EUN	1.8 km	MPC · JPL
279784	1999 TK_{319}	—	October 9, 1999	Socorro	LINEAR	·	1.7 km	MPC · JPL
279785	1999 UK_{25}	—	October 28, 1999	Catalina	CSS	(116763)	2.4 km	MPC · JPL
279786	1999 VZ_{15}	—	November 2, 1999	Kitt Peak	Spacewatch	·	2.3 km	MPC · JPL
279787	1999 VA_{42}	—	November 4, 1999	Kitt Peak	Spacewatch	WIT	1.1 km	MPC · JPL
279788	1999 VH_{60}	—	November 4, 1999	Socorro	LINEAR	·	2.0 km	MPC · JPL
279789	1999 VM_{73}	—	November 1, 1999	Kitt Peak	Spacewatch	·	640 m	MPC · JPL
279790	1999 VL_{79}	—	November 4, 1999	Socorro	LINEAR	·	2.8 km	MPC · JPL
279791	1999 VU_{100}	—	November 9, 1999	Socorro	LINEAR	·	2.3 km	MPC · JPL
279792	1999 VR_{102}	—	November 9, 1999	Socorro	LINEAR	·	2.4 km	MPC · JPL
279793	1999 VZ_{105}	—	November 9, 1999	Socorro	LINEAR	·	810 m	MPC · JPL
279794	1999 XS_{18}	—	December 3, 1999	Socorro	LINEAR	·	2.6 km	MPC · JPL
279795	1999 XE_{40}	—	December 7, 1999	Socorro	LINEAR	·	3.3 km	MPC · JPL
279796	1999 XJ_{74}	—	December 7, 1999	Socorro	LINEAR	·	2.8 km	MPC · JPL
279797	1999 YC_{26}	—	December 31, 1999	Kitt Peak	Spacewatch	·	2.3 km	MPC · JPL
279798	2000 AQ_{146}	—	January 7, 2000	Socorro	LINEAR	H	840 m	MPC · JPL
279799	2000 BP_{6}	—	January 29, 2000	Socorro	LINEAR	H	870 m	MPC · JPL
279800	2000 CC_{105}	—	February 5, 2000	Kitt Peak	M. W. Buie	·	850 m	MPC · JPL

== 279801–279900 ==
back to top

Designation			Discovery			Properties		Ref
Permanent	Provisional	Named after	Date	Site	Discoverer(s)	Category	Diam.	Ref
279801	2000 CO_{131}	—	February 3, 2000	Kitt Peak	Spacewatch	·	1 km	MPC · JPL
279802	2000 DA_{88}	—	February 29, 2000	Socorro	LINEAR	·	1.3 km	MPC · JPL
279803	2000 EJ_{24}	—	March 8, 2000	Kitt Peak	Spacewatch	URS	3.9 km	MPC · JPL
279804	2000 EZ_{67}	—	March 10, 2000	Socorro	LINEAR	·	1.2 km	MPC · JPL
279805	2000 EW_{170}	—	March 5, 2000	Socorro	LINEAR	·	1.4 km	MPC · JPL
279806	2000 EZ_{184}	—	March 5, 2000	Socorro	LINEAR	·	2.4 km	MPC · JPL
279807	2000 FN_{1}	—	March 25, 2000	Kitt Peak	Spacewatch	EOS	2.2 km	MPC · JPL
279808	2000 FH_{68}	—	March 25, 2000	Kitt Peak	Spacewatch	·	1.2 km	MPC · JPL
279809	2000 GD_{11}	—	April 5, 2000	Socorro	LINEAR	·	2.9 km	MPC · JPL
279810	2000 GU_{20}	—	April 5, 2000	Socorro	LINEAR	V	980 m	MPC · JPL
279811	2000 GN_{21}	—	April 5, 2000	Socorro	LINEAR	·	1.1 km	MPC · JPL
279812	2000 GV_{43}	—	April 5, 2000	Socorro	LINEAR	·	1.3 km	MPC · JPL
279813	2000 HS_{17}	—	April 24, 2000	Kitt Peak	Spacewatch	MAS	700 m	MPC · JPL
279814	2000 HX_{28}	—	April 29, 2000	Socorro	LINEAR	·	3.1 km	MPC · JPL
279815	2000 JT_{3}	—	May 4, 2000	Socorro	LINEAR	·	2.2 km	MPC · JPL
279816	2000 JE_{5}	—	May 1, 2000	Socorro	LINEAR	APO · PHA	500 m	MPC · JPL
279817	2000 JA_{7}	—	May 3, 2000	Ondřejov	P. Kušnirák	·	3.6 km	MPC · JPL
279818	2000 JF_{45}	—	May 7, 2000	Socorro	LINEAR	·	1.6 km	MPC · JPL
279819	2000 KK_{67}	—	May 31, 2000	Anderson Mesa	LONEOS	·	3.6 km	MPC · JPL
279820	2000 LJ_{33}	—	June 4, 2000	Haleakala	NEAT	·	1.2 km	MPC · JPL
279821	2000 QQ_{103}	—	August 28, 2000	Socorro	LINEAR	·	2.2 km	MPC · JPL
279822	2000 QM_{110}	—	August 24, 2000	Socorro	LINEAR	NYS	1.3 km	MPC · JPL
279823	2000 RD_{8}	—	September 1, 2000	Socorro	LINEAR	PHO	1.7 km	MPC · JPL
279824	2000 RS_{67}	—	September 1, 2000	Socorro	LINEAR	·	2.6 km	MPC · JPL
279825	2000 RB_{90}	—	September 3, 2000	Socorro	LINEAR	·	1.4 km	MPC · JPL
279826	2000 SF_{19}	—	September 23, 2000	Socorro	LINEAR	·	740 m	MPC · JPL
279827	2000 ST_{98}	—	September 23, 2000	Socorro	LINEAR	·	2.9 km	MPC · JPL
279828	2000 SQ_{108}	—	September 24, 2000	Socorro	LINEAR	·	2.3 km	MPC · JPL
279829	2000 SD_{137}	—	September 23, 2000	Socorro	LINEAR	·	1.6 km	MPC · JPL
279830	2000 SH_{137}	—	September 23, 2000	Socorro	LINEAR	·	1.7 km	MPC · JPL
279831	2000 SL_{155}	—	September 24, 2000	Socorro	LINEAR	·	1.3 km	MPC · JPL
279832	2000 SH_{161}	—	September 28, 2000	Socorro	LINEAR	·	2.7 km	MPC · JPL
279833	2000 SY_{164}	—	September 23, 2000	Socorro	LINEAR	EOS	2.8 km	MPC · JPL
279834	2000 SZ_{181}	—	September 19, 2000	Kvistaberg	Uppsala-DLR Asteroid Survey	TIR	6.2 km	MPC · JPL
279835	2000 SX_{228}	—	September 28, 2000	Socorro	LINEAR	·	1.9 km	MPC · JPL
279836	2000 SW_{264}	—	September 26, 2000	Socorro	LINEAR	·	1.4 km	MPC · JPL
279837	2000 ST_{272}	—	September 28, 2000	Socorro	LINEAR	(5)	1.6 km	MPC · JPL
279838	2000 SH_{324}	—	September 28, 2000	Kitt Peak	Spacewatch	·	1.8 km	MPC · JPL
279839	2000 SA_{344}	—	September 22, 2000	Socorro	LINEAR	TIR	4.4 km	MPC · JPL
279840	2000 TF_{12}	—	October 1, 2000	Socorro	LINEAR	·	2.3 km	MPC · JPL
279841	2000 TA_{49}	—	October 1, 2000	Socorro	LINEAR	·	1.8 km	MPC · JPL
279842	2000 UR_{22}	—	October 24, 2000	Socorro	LINEAR	·	1.8 km	MPC · JPL
279843	2000 UD_{75}	—	October 31, 2000	Socorro	LINEAR	EUN	1.4 km	MPC · JPL
279844	2000 UF_{106}	—	October 30, 2000	Socorro	LINEAR	(5)	1.7 km	MPC · JPL
279845	2000 VY_{59}	—	November 1, 2000	Socorro	LINEAR	·	1.6 km	MPC · JPL
279846	2000 WM_{136}	—	November 20, 2000	Socorro	LINEAR	·	1.7 km	MPC · JPL
279847	2000 XV_{16}	—	December 1, 2000	Socorro	LINEAR	·	1.8 km	MPC · JPL
279848	2000 XJ_{22}	—	December 4, 2000	Socorro	LINEAR	EUN	1.9 km	MPC · JPL
279849	2000 YD_{8}	—	December 21, 2000	Eskridge	G. Hug	MAR	1.5 km	MPC · JPL
279850	2000 YB_{38}	—	December 30, 2000	Socorro	LINEAR	EUN	1.7 km	MPC · JPL
279851	2000 YY_{98}	—	December 30, 2000	Socorro	LINEAR	EUN	1.9 km	MPC · JPL
279852	2001 AU_{18}	—	January 4, 2001	Haleakala	NEAT	·	2.1 km	MPC · JPL
279853	2001 AE_{19}	—	January 4, 2001	Haleakala	NEAT	·	2.2 km	MPC · JPL
279854	2001 AR_{50}	—	January 14, 2001	Kitt Peak	Spacewatch	·	2.3 km	MPC · JPL
279855	2001 BD_{83}	—	January 21, 2001	Socorro	LINEAR	·	1.9 km	MPC · JPL
279856	2001 CR_{15}	—	February 1, 2001	Socorro	LINEAR	·	4.7 km	MPC · JPL
279857	2001 DB_{23}	—	February 17, 2001	Socorro	LINEAR	DOR	3.7 km	MPC · JPL
279858	2001 DA_{48}	—	February 19, 2001	Nogales	Tenagra II	·	1.9 km	MPC · JPL
279859	2001 DC_{87}	—	February 27, 2001	Kitt Peak	Spacewatch	·	3.4 km	MPC · JPL
279860	2001 FU_{6}	—	March 19, 2001	Kitt Peak	Spacewatch	·	500 m	MPC · JPL
279861	2001 FU_{7}	—	March 20, 2001	Kitt Peak	Spacewatch	·	1.7 km	MPC · JPL
279862	2001 FU_{111}	—	March 18, 2001	Socorro	LINEAR	EOS	2.4 km	MPC · JPL
279863	2001 HH	—	April 16, 2001	Kitt Peak	Spacewatch	·	690 m	MPC · JPL
279864	2001 HP_{17}	—	April 24, 2001	Kitt Peak	Spacewatch	615	2.1 km	MPC · JPL
279865	2001 HU_{24}	—	April 27, 2001	Kitt Peak	Spacewatch	·	860 m	MPC · JPL
279866	2001 KH_{70}	—	May 23, 2001	Kitt Peak	Spacewatch	BRA	2.2 km	MPC · JPL
279867	2001 MA_{16}	—	June 27, 2001	Palomar	NEAT	·	1.6 km	MPC · JPL
279868	2001 MV_{29}	—	June 28, 2001	Anderson Mesa	LONEOS	·	6.5 km	MPC · JPL
279869	2001 NK_{3}	—	July 13, 2001	Palomar	NEAT	·	3.4 km	MPC · JPL
279870	2001 NL_{19}	—	July 14, 2001	Palomar	NEAT	·	4.7 km	MPC · JPL
279871	2001 OR_{17}	—	July 17, 2001	Haleakala	NEAT	·	870 m	MPC · JPL
279872	2001 OD_{38}	—	July 20, 2001	Palomar	NEAT	·	990 m	MPC · JPL
279873	2001 OR_{67}	—	July 27, 2001	Prescott	P. G. Comba	H	680 m	MPC · JPL
279874	2001 OA_{92}	—	July 21, 2001	Haleakala	NEAT	(1338) (FLO)	880 m	MPC · JPL
279875	2001 OG_{101}	—	July 27, 2001	Haleakala	NEAT	·	1.2 km	MPC · JPL
279876	2001 PJ_{8}	—	August 11, 2001	Palomar	NEAT	·	2.0 km	MPC · JPL
279877	2001 PQ_{8}	—	August 11, 2001	Haleakala	NEAT	·	5.5 km	MPC · JPL
279878	2001 PE_{24}	—	August 11, 2001	Haleakala	NEAT	H	770 m	MPC · JPL
279879	2001 PZ_{34}	—	August 10, 2001	Palomar	NEAT	·	6.5 km	MPC · JPL
279880	2001 PJ_{42}	—	August 12, 2001	Palomar	NEAT	H	790 m	MPC · JPL
279881	2001 PX_{50}	—	August 3, 2001	Haleakala	NEAT	·	7.1 km	MPC · JPL
279882	2001 PO_{52}	—	August 15, 2001	Haleakala	NEAT	·	2.6 km	MPC · JPL
279883	2001 PE_{60}	—	August 13, 2001	Haleakala	NEAT	·	1.2 km	MPC · JPL
279884	2001 PE_{65}	—	August 11, 2001	Palomar	NEAT	V	800 m	MPC · JPL
279885	2001 QO	—	August 16, 2001	Socorro	LINEAR	H	680 m	MPC · JPL
279886	2001 QG_{36}	—	August 16, 2001	Socorro	LINEAR	·	3.4 km	MPC · JPL
279887	2001 QF_{45}	—	August 16, 2001	Socorro	LINEAR	·	1.3 km	MPC · JPL
279888	2001 QX_{90}	—	August 22, 2001	Socorro	LINEAR	H	790 m	MPC · JPL
279889	2001 QO_{92}	—	August 22, 2001	Socorro	LINEAR	ERI	2.2 km	MPC · JPL
279890	2001 QP_{105}	—	August 23, 2001	Socorro	LINEAR	·	4.8 km	MPC · JPL
279891	2001 QQ_{115}	—	August 17, 2001	Socorro	LINEAR	·	4.3 km	MPC · JPL
279892	2001 QH_{134}	—	August 22, 2001	Socorro	LINEAR	·	3.4 km	MPC · JPL
279893	2001 QZ_{136}	—	August 22, 2001	Socorro	LINEAR	·	1.6 km	MPC · JPL
279894	2001 QD_{146}	—	August 25, 2001	Kitt Peak	Spacewatch	·	3.7 km	MPC · JPL
279895	2001 QB_{152}	—	August 26, 2001	Socorro	LINEAR	H	1.1 km	MPC · JPL
279896	2001 QH_{163}	—	August 23, 2001	Anderson Mesa	LONEOS	·	3.6 km	MPC · JPL
279897	2001 QZ_{165}	—	August 24, 2001	Haleakala	NEAT	·	1.1 km	MPC · JPL
279898	2001 QP_{174}	—	August 27, 2001	Socorro	LINEAR	·	4.1 km	MPC · JPL
279899	2001 QY_{186}	—	August 21, 2001	Palomar	NEAT	·	5.3 km	MPC · JPL
279900	2001 QP_{205}	—	August 23, 2001	Socorro	LINEAR	·	4.7 km	MPC · JPL

== 279901–280000 ==
back to top

Designation			Discovery			Properties		Ref
Permanent	Provisional	Named after	Date	Site	Discoverer(s)	Category	Diam.	Ref
279901	2001 QW_{222}	—	August 24, 2001	Anderson Mesa	LONEOS	·	3.4 km	MPC · JPL
279902	2001 QT_{223}	—	August 24, 2001	Anderson Mesa	LONEOS	·	2.2 km	MPC · JPL
279903	2001 QD_{225}	—	August 24, 2001	Palomar	NEAT	·	910 m	MPC · JPL
279904	2001 QZ_{228}	—	August 24, 2001	Anderson Mesa	LONEOS	·	4.0 km	MPC · JPL
279905	2001 QP_{229}	—	August 24, 2001	Anderson Mesa	LONEOS	(2076)	890 m	MPC · JPL
279906	2001 QD_{244}	—	August 24, 2001	Socorro	LINEAR	·	3.5 km	MPC · JPL
279907	2001 QO_{249}	—	August 24, 2001	Socorro	LINEAR	·	1.1 km	MPC · JPL
279908	2001 QW_{249}	—	August 24, 2001	Haleakala	NEAT	·	1.9 km	MPC · JPL
279909	2001 QT_{281}	—	August 19, 2001	Socorro	LINEAR	TIR ·	6.2 km	MPC · JPL
279910	2001 QO_{288}	—	August 17, 2001	Palomar	NEAT	·	4.4 km	MPC · JPL
279911	2001 QZ_{333}	—	August 26, 2001	Haleakala	NEAT	·	4.6 km	MPC · JPL
279912	2001 RS_{1}	—	September 7, 2001	Socorro	LINEAR	·	3.7 km	MPC · JPL
279913	2001 RT_{8}	—	September 9, 2001	Socorro	LINEAR	V	940 m	MPC · JPL
279914	2001 RB_{9}	—	September 8, 2001	Socorro	LINEAR	EUP	8.7 km	MPC · JPL
279915	2001 RF_{9}	—	September 8, 2001	Socorro	LINEAR	EUP	7.4 km	MPC · JPL
279916	2001 RU_{16}	—	September 11, 2001	Desert Eagle	W. K. Y. Yeung	·	780 m	MPC · JPL
279917	2001 RU_{26}	—	September 7, 2001	Socorro	LINEAR	·	1.3 km	MPC · JPL
279918	2001 RE_{30}	—	September 7, 2001	Socorro	LINEAR	·	2.2 km	MPC · JPL
279919	2001 RV_{47}	—	September 12, 2001	Socorro	LINEAR	·	1.3 km	MPC · JPL
279920	2001 RZ_{78}	—	September 10, 2001	Socorro	LINEAR	PHO	2.4 km	MPC · JPL
279921	2001 RM_{82}	—	September 11, 2001	Anderson Mesa	LONEOS	·	4.4 km	MPC · JPL
279922	2001 RU_{87}	—	September 11, 2001	Anderson Mesa	LONEOS	·	910 m	MPC · JPL
279923	2001 RL_{104}	—	September 12, 2001	Socorro	LINEAR	NYS	1.6 km	MPC · JPL
279924	2001 RL_{120}	—	September 12, 2001	Socorro	LINEAR	THM	2.9 km	MPC · JPL
279925	2001 RS_{145}	—	September 8, 2001	Socorro	LINEAR	·	3.2 km	MPC · JPL
279926	2001 SC_{8}	—	September 18, 2001	Kitt Peak	Spacewatch	EOS	2.8 km	MPC · JPL
279927	2001 SJ_{11}	—	September 16, 2001	Socorro	LINEAR	V	1.0 km	MPC · JPL
279928	2001 SR_{13}	—	September 16, 2001	Socorro	LINEAR	·	860 m	MPC · JPL
279929	2001 SX_{22}	—	September 16, 2001	Socorro	LINEAR	V	790 m	MPC · JPL
279930	2001 SX_{26}	—	September 16, 2001	Socorro	LINEAR	·	930 m	MPC · JPL
279931	2001 SK_{32}	—	September 16, 2001	Socorro	LINEAR	EUP	4.3 km	MPC · JPL
279932	2001 SD_{37}	—	September 16, 2001	Socorro	LINEAR	·	1.5 km	MPC · JPL
279933	2001 SE_{41}	—	September 16, 2001	Socorro	LINEAR	·	3.1 km	MPC · JPL
279934	2001 SD_{42}	—	September 16, 2001	Socorro	LINEAR	THM	2.8 km	MPC · JPL
279935	2001 SZ_{44}	—	September 16, 2001	Socorro	LINEAR	·	960 m	MPC · JPL
279936	2001 SV_{64}	—	September 17, 2001	Socorro	LINEAR	·	1.6 km	MPC · JPL
279937	2001 SL_{74}	—	September 19, 2001	Anderson Mesa	LONEOS	LIX	6.1 km	MPC · JPL
279938	2001 SJ_{78}	—	September 19, 2001	Socorro	LINEAR	·	3.5 km	MPC · JPL
279939	2001 SF_{79}	—	September 20, 2001	Socorro	LINEAR	·	3.5 km	MPC · JPL
279940	2001 SB_{84}	—	September 20, 2001	Socorro	LINEAR	·	1.7 km	MPC · JPL
279941	2001 SR_{84}	—	September 20, 2001	Socorro	LINEAR	HYG	3.4 km	MPC · JPL
279942	2001 SE_{103}	—	September 20, 2001	Socorro	LINEAR	V	680 m	MPC · JPL
279943	2001 SO_{117}	—	September 16, 2001	Socorro	LINEAR	(2076)	830 m	MPC · JPL
279944	2001 SC_{123}	—	September 16, 2001	Socorro	LINEAR	·	1.8 km	MPC · JPL
279945	2001 SP_{134}	—	September 16, 2001	Socorro	LINEAR	·	4.6 km	MPC · JPL
279946	2001 SO_{136}	—	September 16, 2001	Socorro	LINEAR	·	1.6 km	MPC · JPL
279947	2001 SG_{142}	—	September 16, 2001	Socorro	LINEAR	(2076)	680 m	MPC · JPL
279948	2001 SE_{149}	—	September 17, 2001	Socorro	LINEAR	V	1.1 km	MPC · JPL
279949	2001 SJ_{157}	—	September 17, 2001	Socorro	LINEAR	·	3.3 km	MPC · JPL
279950	2001 SE_{177}	—	September 16, 2001	Socorro	LINEAR	·	1.3 km	MPC · JPL
279951	2001 SO_{179}	—	September 17, 2001	Socorro	LINEAR	PHO	1.0 km	MPC · JPL
279952	2001 SQ_{186}	—	September 19, 2001	Socorro	LINEAR	NYS	930 m	MPC · JPL
279953	2001 SH_{187}	—	September 19, 2001	Socorro	LINEAR	THM	2.6 km	MPC · JPL
279954	2001 SA_{197}	—	September 19, 2001	Socorro	LINEAR	·	1.3 km	MPC · JPL
279955	2001 SM_{223}	—	September 19, 2001	Socorro	LINEAR	·	870 m	MPC · JPL
279956	2001 SB_{225}	—	September 19, 2001	Socorro	LINEAR	·	890 m	MPC · JPL
279957	2001 SM_{235}	—	September 19, 2001	Socorro	LINEAR	MAS	710 m	MPC · JPL
279958	2001 SX_{235}	—	September 19, 2001	Socorro	LINEAR	·	3.7 km	MPC · JPL
279959	2001 SG_{252}	—	September 19, 2001	Socorro	LINEAR	H	650 m	MPC · JPL
279960	2001 SK_{267}	—	September 25, 2001	Bohyunsan	Jeon, Y.-B., Lee, B.-C.	THM	2.8 km	MPC · JPL
279961	2001 SK_{305}	—	September 20, 2001	Socorro	LINEAR	·	4.1 km	MPC · JPL
279962	2001 SD_{312}	—	September 20, 2001	Socorro	LINEAR	V	800 m	MPC · JPL
279963	2001 SF_{314}	—	September 22, 2001	Socorro	LINEAR	·	1.2 km	MPC · JPL
279964	2001 SZ_{325}	—	September 17, 2001	Socorro	LINEAR	·	1.1 km	MPC · JPL
279965	2001 SP_{332}	—	September 19, 2001	Kitt Peak	Spacewatch	·	4.3 km	MPC · JPL
279966	2001 TD_{8}	—	October 15, 2001	Kleť	Kleť	·	1.7 km	MPC · JPL
279967	2001 TA_{14}	—	October 12, 2001	Ondřejov	P. Kušnirák	V	810 m	MPC · JPL
279968	2001 TC_{25}	—	October 14, 2001	Socorro	LINEAR	·	1.2 km	MPC · JPL
279969	2001 TF_{28}	—	October 14, 2001	Socorro	LINEAR	·	1.8 km	MPC · JPL
279970	2001 TZ_{54}	—	October 14, 2001	Socorro	LINEAR	·	950 m	MPC · JPL
279971	2001 TW_{55}	—	October 15, 2001	Socorro	LINEAR	·	810 m	MPC · JPL
279972	2001 TX_{58}	—	October 13, 2001	Socorro	LINEAR	·	5.7 km	MPC · JPL
279973	2001 TM_{70}	—	October 13, 2001	Socorro	LINEAR	·	1.5 km	MPC · JPL
279974	2001 TB_{84}	—	October 14, 2001	Socorro	LINEAR	·	2.6 km	MPC · JPL
279975	2001 TZ_{94}	—	October 14, 2001	Socorro	LINEAR	·	1.5 km	MPC · JPL
279976	2001 TQ_{103}	—	October 7, 2001	Palomar	NEAT	·	720 m	MPC · JPL
279977	2001 TU_{104}	—	October 13, 2001	Socorro	LINEAR	·	1.2 km	MPC · JPL
279978	2001 TT_{121}	—	October 15, 2001	Socorro	LINEAR	H	650 m	MPC · JPL
279979	2001 TS_{134}	—	October 13, 2001	Palomar	NEAT	·	1.2 km	MPC · JPL
279980	2001 TR_{153}	—	October 13, 2001	Palomar	NEAT	·	4.8 km	MPC · JPL
279981	2001 TJ_{167}	—	October 15, 2001	Socorro	LINEAR	PHO	1.2 km	MPC · JPL
279982	2001 TE_{171}	—	October 15, 2001	Palomar	NEAT	·	5.2 km	MPC · JPL
279983	2001 TF_{176}	—	October 14, 2001	Socorro	LINEAR	·	2.3 km	MPC · JPL
279984	2001 TA_{188}	—	October 14, 2001	Socorro	LINEAR	V	810 m	MPC · JPL
279985	2001 TJ_{231}	—	October 15, 2001	Desert Eagle	W. K. Y. Yeung	·	1.1 km	MPC · JPL
279986	2001 TK_{258}	—	October 8, 2001	Palomar	NEAT	V	850 m	MPC · JPL
279987	2001 UP_{15}	—	October 25, 2001	Desert Eagle	W. K. Y. Yeung	·	3.2 km	MPC · JPL
279988	2001 UK_{26}	—	October 18, 2001	Socorro	LINEAR	·	4.0 km	MPC · JPL
279989	2001 UH_{37}	—	October 17, 2001	Socorro	LINEAR	PHO	1.5 km	MPC · JPL
279990	2001 UN_{55}	—	October 17, 2001	Socorro	LINEAR	·	1.9 km	MPC · JPL
279991	2001 UY_{58}	—	October 17, 2001	Socorro	LINEAR	·	1.3 km	MPC · JPL
279992	2001 US_{75}	—	October 17, 2001	Socorro	LINEAR	PHO	3.7 km	MPC · JPL
279993	2001 UP_{88}	—	October 21, 2001	Kitt Peak	Spacewatch	·	940 m	MPC · JPL
279994	2001 UE_{95}	—	October 19, 2001	Palomar	NEAT	V	1.1 km	MPC · JPL
279995	2001 UE_{103}	—	October 20, 2001	Socorro	LINEAR	NYS	1.5 km	MPC · JPL
279996	2001 US_{104}	—	October 20, 2001	Socorro	LINEAR	·	3.0 km	MPC · JPL
279997	2001 UZ_{107}	—	October 20, 2001	Socorro	LINEAR	·	1.1 km	MPC · JPL
279998	2001 UX_{147}	—	October 23, 2001	Socorro	LINEAR	·	1.6 km	MPC · JPL
279999	2001 UD_{151}	—	October 23, 2001	Socorro	LINEAR	·	1.6 km	MPC · JPL
280000	2001 UO_{152}	—	October 23, 2001	Socorro	LINEAR	·	1.9 km	MPC · JPL

back to top

== See also ==
- Meanings of minor-planet names: 279001–280000
