= Meanings of minor-planet names: 280001–281000 =

As minor planet discoveries are confirmed, they are given a permanent number by the IAU's Minor Planet Center (MPC), and the discoverers can then submit names for them, following the IAU's naming conventions. The list below concerns those minor planets in the specified number-range that have received names, and explains the meanings of those names.

Official naming citations of newly named small Solar System bodies are approved and published in a bulletin by IAU's Working Group for Small Bodies Nomenclature (WGSBN). Before May 2021, citations were published in MPC's Minor Planet Circulars for many decades. Recent citations can also be found on the JPL Small-Body Database (SBDB). Until his death in 2016, German astronomer Lutz D. Schmadel compiled these citations into the Dictionary of Minor Planet Names (DMP) and regularly updated the collection.

Based on Paul Herget's The Names of the Minor Planets, Schmadel also researched the unclear origin of numerous asteroids, most of which had been named prior to World War II. This article incorporates text from this source, which is in the public domain: SBDB New namings may only be added to this list below after official publication as the preannouncement of names is condemned. The WGSBN publishes a comprehensive guideline for the naming rules of non-cometary small Solar System bodies.

== 280001–280100 ==
Named minor planet	Provisional	This minor planet was named for...	Ref · Catalog
There are no named minor planets in this number range

== 280101–280200 ==
back to top

Named minor planet	Provisional	This minor planet was named for...	Ref · Catalog
There are no named minor planets in this number range

== 280201–280300 ==
back to top

Named minor planet	Provisional	This minor planet was named for...	Ref · Catalog
280244 Ati	2002 WP_{11}	Ati is a character, created by the National Etruscan Museum of Villa Giulia and Genus Bononiae, symbolizing an Etruscan princess and a free, independent woman of the ancient Etruria (sixth century BCE). She represents the portrait of a truly surprising female status for her epoch: emancipated and full of dignity	IAU · 280244

== 280301–280400 ==
back to top

Named minor planet	Provisional	This minor planet was named for...	Ref · Catalog
There are no named minor planets in this number range

== 280401–280500 ==
back to top

Named minor planet	Provisional	This minor planet was named for...	Ref · Catalog
There are no named minor planets in this number range

== 280501–280600 ==
back to top

Named minor planet	Provisional	This minor planet was named for...	Ref · Catalog
There are no named minor planets in this number range

== 280601–280700 ==
back to top

Named minor planet	Provisional	This minor planet was named for...	Ref · Catalog
280640 Ruetsch	2005 AV	Simon Ruetsch (born 1996), a member of the Jura Astronomy Society (French: Société jurassienne d'astronomie) in Switzerland	JPL · 280640
280641 Edosara	2005 AT_{3}	Edoardo Rossi (born 1998) and Sara Breschi (born 1996), two amateur astronomers at the Pistoia Mountains Astronomical Observatory in Italy	JPL · 280641
280642 Doubs	2005 AR_{27}	The Doubs, a 453-km-long river in eastern France and western Switzerland, tributary of the Saône.	JPL · 280642
280652 Aimaku	2005 CQ	AIMAKU, the Italian association for people who suffer from alkaptonuria (genetic disease)	JPL · 280652
280686 Jasevičius	2005 EU_{249}	Vaidotas Jasevičius, Lithuanian astronomer.	IAU · 280686

== 280701–280800 ==
back to top

Named minor planet	Provisional	This minor planet was named for...	Ref · Catalog
There are no named minor planets in this number range

== 280801–280900 ==
back to top

Named minor planet	Provisional	This minor planet was named for...	Ref · Catalog
280868 Jasevičius	2005 EU_{249}	Vaidotas Jasevičius, Lithuanian astronomer and mathematician.	IAU · 280868

== 280901–281000 ==
back to top

Named minor planet	Provisional	This minor planet was named for...	Ref · Catalog
280924 Eurypterus	2006 AP_{22}	Eurypterus, an extinct genus of sea scorpion from the Silurian period, about 430 million years ago.	IAU · 280924

back to top

Preceded by 279,001–280,000	Meanings of minor-planet names List of minor planets: 280,001–281,000	Succeeded by 281,001–282,000
