= List of minor planets: 280001–281000 =

The following is a partial list of minor planets, running from minor-planet number 280001 through 281000, inclusive. The primary data for this and other partial lists is based on JPL's "Small-Body Orbital Elements" and data available from the Minor Planet Center. Critical list information is also provided by the MPC, unless otherwise specified from Lowell Observatory. A detailed description of the table's columns and additional sources are given on the main page including a complete list of every page in this series, and a statistical break-up on the dynamical classification of minor planets.

Also see the summary list of all named bodies in numerical and alphabetical order, and the corresponding naming citations for the number range of this particular list. New namings may only be added to this list after official publication, as the preannouncement of names is condemned by the Working Group for Small Bodies Nomenclature of the International Astronomical Union.

Near-Earth obj.	MBA (inner)	MBA (outer)	Centaur
Mars-crosser	MBA (middle)	Jupiter trojan	Trans-Neptunian obj.
Unclassified

== 280001–280100 ==
Designation			Discovery			Properties		Ref
Permanent	Provisional	Named after	Date	Site	Discoverer(s)	Category	Diam.	Ref
280001	2001 UH_{156}	—	October 23, 2001	Socorro	LINEAR	·	4.5 km	MPC · JPL
280002	2001 UT_{157}	—	October 23, 2001	Socorro	LINEAR	NYS	1.8 km	MPC · JPL
280003	2001 UF_{163}	—	October 23, 2001	Socorro	LINEAR	NYS	1.4 km	MPC · JPL
280004	2001 US_{171}	—	October 24, 2001	Socorro	LINEAR	·	5.8 km	MPC · JPL
280005	2001 UP_{172}	—	October 18, 2001	Palomar	NEAT	NYS	1.5 km	MPC · JPL
280006	2001 US_{195}	—	October 18, 2001	Kitt Peak	Spacewatch	·	640 m	MPC · JPL
280007	2001 US_{201}	—	October 19, 2001	Palomar	NEAT	HYG	3.4 km	MPC · JPL
280008	2001 UR_{224}	—	October 21, 2001	Socorro	LINEAR	·	1.3 km	MPC · JPL
280009	2001 VM_{6}	—	November 9, 2001	Socorro	LINEAR	·	1.6 km	MPC · JPL
280010	2001 VQ_{17}	—	November 9, 2001	Socorro	LINEAR	NYS	1.2 km	MPC · JPL
280011	2001 VY_{53}	—	November 10, 2001	Socorro	LINEAR	·	1.7 km	MPC · JPL
280012	2001 VR_{72}	—	November 12, 2001	Kitt Peak	Spacewatch	V	740 m	MPC · JPL
280013	2001 VM_{76}	—	November 9, 2001	Socorro	LINEAR	H	720 m	MPC · JPL
280014	2001 VK_{80}	—	November 10, 2001	Palomar	NEAT	·	4.5 km	MPC · JPL
280015	2001 VO_{89}	—	November 12, 2001	Socorro	LINEAR	·	1.5 km	MPC · JPL
280016	2001 WZ_{1}	—	November 18, 2001	Socorro	LINEAR	H	530 m	MPC · JPL
280017	2001 WC_{2}	—	November 18, 2001	Socorro	LINEAR	·	3.2 km	MPC · JPL
280018	2001 WQ_{2}	—	November 17, 2001	Socorro	LINEAR	H	620 m	MPC · JPL
280019	2001 WD_{7}	—	November 17, 2001	Socorro	LINEAR	·	1.5 km	MPC · JPL
280020	2001 WE_{7}	—	November 17, 2001	Socorro	LINEAR	·	1.1 km	MPC · JPL
280021	2001 WG_{13}	—	November 17, 2001	Socorro	LINEAR	·	1.6 km	MPC · JPL
280022	2001 WP_{61}	—	November 19, 2001	Socorro	LINEAR	EOS	2.8 km	MPC · JPL
280023	2001 WH_{101}	—	November 17, 2001	Kitt Peak	Spacewatch	CYB	4.1 km	MPC · JPL
280024	2001 XP_{5}	—	December 7, 2001	Socorro	LINEAR	·	5.1 km	MPC · JPL
280025	2001 XA_{38}	—	December 9, 2001	Socorro	LINEAR	·	2.8 km	MPC · JPL
280026	2001 XA_{53}	—	December 10, 2001	Socorro	LINEAR	·	1.5 km	MPC · JPL
280027	2001 XL_{124}	—	December 14, 2001	Socorro	LINEAR	·	1.7 km	MPC · JPL
280028	2001 XO_{126}	—	December 14, 2001	Socorro	LINEAR	MAS	880 m	MPC · JPL
280029	2001 XW_{131}	—	December 14, 2001	Socorro	LINEAR	·	2.1 km	MPC · JPL
280030	2001 XS_{162}	—	December 14, 2001	Socorro	LINEAR	MAS	990 m	MPC · JPL
280031	2001 XY_{174}	—	December 14, 2001	Socorro	LINEAR	·	1.2 km	MPC · JPL
280032	2001 XT_{192}	—	December 14, 2001	Socorro	LINEAR	RAF	2.4 km	MPC · JPL
280033	2001 XU_{205}	—	December 11, 2001	Socorro	LINEAR	TIR	4.1 km	MPC · JPL
280034	2001 XC_{206}	—	December 11, 2001	Socorro	LINEAR	THB	5.0 km	MPC · JPL
280035	2001 XP_{225}	—	December 15, 2001	Socorro	LINEAR	·	1.4 km	MPC · JPL
280036	2001 XV_{252}	—	December 14, 2001	Socorro	LINEAR	EUN	1.6 km	MPC · JPL
280037	2001 YE_{67}	—	December 18, 2001	Socorro	LINEAR	·	2.0 km	MPC · JPL
280038	2001 YH_{89}	—	December 18, 2001	Socorro	LINEAR	·	1.7 km	MPC · JPL
280039	2001 YQ_{130}	—	December 17, 2001	Socorro	LINEAR	·	1.3 km	MPC · JPL
280040	2001 YF_{138}	—	December 20, 2001	Palomar	NEAT	·	2.3 km	MPC · JPL
280041	2001 YJ_{149}	—	December 19, 2001	Palomar	NEAT	·	2.1 km	MPC · JPL
280042	2002 AB	—	January 3, 2002	Socorro	LINEAR	·	2.1 km	MPC · JPL
280043	2002 AC_{37}	—	January 9, 2002	Socorro	LINEAR	·	1.5 km	MPC · JPL
280044	2002 AT_{54}	—	January 9, 2002	Socorro	LINEAR	·	1.5 km	MPC · JPL
280045	2002 AN_{61}	—	January 11, 2002	Socorro	LINEAR	·	1.8 km	MPC · JPL
280046	2002 AX_{84}	—	January 9, 2002	Socorro	LINEAR	·	1.9 km	MPC · JPL
280047	2002 AY_{123}	—	January 9, 2002	Socorro	LINEAR	·	1.6 km	MPC · JPL
280048	2002 AT_{131}	—	January 8, 2002	Socorro	LINEAR	H	830 m	MPC · JPL
280049	2002 AD_{136}	—	January 9, 2002	Socorro	LINEAR	·	1.3 km	MPC · JPL
280050	2002 AO_{154}	—	January 14, 2002	Socorro	LINEAR	·	2.7 km	MPC · JPL
280051	2002 BA_{12}	—	January 19, 2002	Socorro	LINEAR	·	4.7 km	MPC · JPL
280052	2002 BJ_{13}	—	January 18, 2002	Socorro	LINEAR	RAF	1.5 km	MPC · JPL
280053	2002 CL_{21}	—	February 5, 2002	Palomar	NEAT	·	2.1 km	MPC · JPL
280054	2002 CM_{30}	—	February 6, 2002	Socorro	LINEAR	·	2.3 km	MPC · JPL
280055	2002 CW_{35}	—	February 7, 2002	Socorro	LINEAR	·	2.0 km	MPC · JPL
280056	2002 CV_{54}	—	February 7, 2002	Socorro	LINEAR	(2076)	1.1 km	MPC · JPL
280057	2002 CS_{61}	—	February 6, 2002	Socorro	LINEAR	·	2.7 km	MPC · JPL
280058	2002 CA_{72}	—	February 7, 2002	Socorro	LINEAR	EMA	4.5 km	MPC · JPL
280059	2002 CG_{77}	—	February 7, 2002	Socorro	LINEAR	·	1.6 km	MPC · JPL
280060	2002 CQ_{81}	—	February 7, 2002	Socorro	LINEAR	·	1.2 km	MPC · JPL
280061	2002 CL_{96}	—	February 7, 2002	Socorro	LINEAR	·	970 m	MPC · JPL
280062	2002 CH_{111}	—	February 7, 2002	Socorro	LINEAR	·	1.8 km	MPC · JPL
280063	2002 CF_{115}	—	February 10, 2002	Socorro	LINEAR	·	1.9 km	MPC · JPL
280064	2002 CY_{119}	—	February 7, 2002	Socorro	LINEAR	(5)	1.3 km	MPC · JPL
280065	2002 CK_{125}	—	February 7, 2002	Socorro	LINEAR	·	1.7 km	MPC · JPL
280066	2002 CB_{148}	—	February 10, 2002	Socorro	LINEAR	·	1.6 km	MPC · JPL
280067	2002 CD_{150}	—	February 10, 2002	Socorro	LINEAR	·	1.6 km	MPC · JPL
280068	2002 CU_{155}	—	February 6, 2002	Socorro	LINEAR	·	1.3 km	MPC · JPL
280069	2002 CB_{156}	—	February 6, 2002	Socorro	LINEAR	·	4.5 km	MPC · JPL
280070	2002 CR_{192}	—	February 10, 2002	Socorro	LINEAR	(5)	1.4 km	MPC · JPL
280071	2002 CX_{215}	—	February 10, 2002	Socorro	LINEAR	(5)	1.8 km	MPC · JPL
280072	2002 CL_{218}	—	February 10, 2002	Socorro	LINEAR	L4	10 km	MPC · JPL
280073	2002 CQ_{224}	—	February 11, 2002	Socorro	LINEAR	·	1.8 km	MPC · JPL
280074	2002 CP_{225}	—	February 4, 2002	Palomar	NEAT	·	2.6 km	MPC · JPL
280075	2002 CH_{228}	—	February 6, 2002	Palomar	NEAT	(5)	1.4 km	MPC · JPL
280076	2002 CJ_{237}	—	February 10, 2002	Socorro	LINEAR	·	2.8 km	MPC · JPL
280077	2002 CU_{238}	—	February 11, 2002	Socorro	LINEAR	(13314)	2.3 km	MPC · JPL
280078	2002 CN_{248}	—	February 14, 2002	Haleakala	NEAT	·	2.2 km	MPC · JPL
280079	2002 CG_{263}	—	February 6, 2002	Socorro	LINEAR	·	1.9 km	MPC · JPL
280080	2002 CY_{267}	—	February 7, 2002	Anderson Mesa	LONEOS	·	1.9 km	MPC · JPL
280081	2002 CX_{284}	—	February 9, 2002	Kitt Peak	Spacewatch	·	1.3 km	MPC · JPL
280082	2002 CE_{286}	—	February 10, 2002	Kitt Peak	Spacewatch	·	1.1 km	MPC · JPL
280083	2002 CK_{294}	—	February 10, 2002	Socorro	LINEAR	·	2.3 km	MPC · JPL
280084	2002 CZ_{295}	—	February 10, 2002	Socorro	LINEAR	·	2.0 km	MPC · JPL
280085	2002 CQ_{301}	—	February 11, 2002	Socorro	LINEAR	·	1.9 km	MPC · JPL
280086	2002 CQ_{316}	—	February 6, 2002	Palomar	NEAT	·	1.2 km	MPC · JPL
280087	2002 DO_{8}	—	February 19, 2002	Socorro	LINEAR	·	2.0 km	MPC · JPL
280088	2002 DQ_{9}	—	February 19, 2002	Socorro	LINEAR	·	4.4 km	MPC · JPL
280089	2002 EB_{16}	—	March 6, 2002	Palomar	NEAT	·	2.4 km	MPC · JPL
280090	2002 EH_{24}	—	March 5, 2002	Kitt Peak	Spacewatch	·	1.2 km	MPC · JPL
280091	2002 EK_{25}	—	March 10, 2002	Anderson Mesa	LONEOS	·	3.2 km	MPC · JPL
280092	2002 EF_{56}	—	March 13, 2002	Socorro	LINEAR	MAR	3.3 km	MPC · JPL
280093	2002 EO_{61}	—	March 13, 2002	Socorro	LINEAR	(5)	1.5 km	MPC · JPL
280094	2002 ED_{64}	—	March 13, 2002	Socorro	LINEAR	·	1.6 km	MPC · JPL
280095	2002 EV_{75}	—	February 8, 2002	Palomar	NEAT	·	2.7 km	MPC · JPL
280096	2002 ED_{105}	—	March 9, 2002	Anderson Mesa	LONEOS	·	2.0 km	MPC · JPL
280097	2002 EA_{119}	—	March 10, 2002	Anderson Mesa	LONEOS	·	2.0 km	MPC · JPL
280098	2002 ER_{122}	—	March 12, 2002	Anderson Mesa	LONEOS	·	3.1 km	MPC · JPL
280099	2002 EV_{133}	—	March 13, 2002	Palomar	NEAT	(5)	1.8 km	MPC · JPL
280100	2002 EA_{141}	—	March 12, 2002	Palomar	NEAT	·	1.9 km	MPC · JPL

== 280101–280200 ==
back to top

Designation			Discovery			Properties		Ref
Permanent	Provisional	Named after	Date	Site	Discoverer(s)	Category	Diam.	Ref
280101	2002 FS_{7}	—	March 16, 2002	Kitt Peak	Spacewatch	(5)	1.4 km	MPC · JPL
280102	2002 FG_{17}	—	March 17, 2002	Haleakala	NEAT	·	3.9 km	MPC · JPL
280103	2002 FD_{20}	—	March 18, 2002	Haleakala	NEAT	RAF	1.3 km	MPC · JPL
280104	2002 FS_{32}	—	March 21, 2002	Palomar	NEAT	·	2.2 km	MPC · JPL
280105	2002 GO_{52}	—	April 5, 2002	Anderson Mesa	LONEOS	·	1.7 km	MPC · JPL
280106	2002 GQ_{59}	—	April 8, 2002	Palomar	NEAT	·	850 m	MPC · JPL
280107	2002 GD_{72}	—	April 9, 2002	Anderson Mesa	LONEOS	·	2.6 km	MPC · JPL
280108	2002 GN_{75}	—	April 9, 2002	Socorro	LINEAR	·	2.0 km	MPC · JPL
280109	2002 GU_{82}	—	April 10, 2002	Socorro	LINEAR	·	3.3 km	MPC · JPL
280110	2002 GE_{89}	—	April 10, 2002	Palomar	NEAT	PHO	1.2 km	MPC · JPL
280111	2002 GP_{105}	—	April 11, 2002	Anderson Mesa	LONEOS	EUN	1.8 km	MPC · JPL
280112	2002 GG_{144}	—	April 11, 2002	Palomar	NEAT	·	1.6 km	MPC · JPL
280113	2002 GN_{145}	—	April 12, 2002	Socorro	LINEAR	·	3.2 km	MPC · JPL
280114	2002 GC_{152}	—	April 12, 2002	Palomar	NEAT	·	1.8 km	MPC · JPL
280115	2002 GC_{183}	—	April 11, 2002	Palomar	NEAT	·	2.9 km	MPC · JPL
280116	2002 GH_{186}	—	April 13, 2002	Palomar	NEAT	·	2.2 km	MPC · JPL
280117	2002 HN_{1}	—	April 16, 2002	Socorro	LINEAR	EUN	1.8 km	MPC · JPL
280118	2002 JV_{1}	—	May 4, 2002	Desert Eagle	W. K. Y. Yeung	·	6.6 km	MPC · JPL
280119	2002 JQ_{2}	—	May 5, 2002	Palomar	NEAT	·	2.4 km	MPC · JPL
280120	2002 JM_{5}	—	May 5, 2002	Prescott	P. G. Comba	·	3.7 km	MPC · JPL
280121	2002 JG_{9}	—	May 7, 2002	Prescott	P. G. Comba	ADE	2.5 km	MPC · JPL
280122	2002 JO_{94}	—	May 11, 2002	Socorro	LINEAR	·	3.1 km	MPC · JPL
280123	2002 JM_{114}	—	May 15, 2002	Haleakala	NEAT	RAF	990 m	MPC · JPL
280124	2002 JW_{125}	—	May 7, 2002	Palomar	NEAT	·	1.7 km	MPC · JPL
280125	2002 JK_{136}	—	May 9, 2002	Palomar	NEAT	MAS	840 m	MPC · JPL
280126	2002 JA_{149}	—	May 1, 2002	Palomar	NEAT	ADE	3.2 km	MPC · JPL
280127	2002 KJ_{5}	—	May 16, 2002	Socorro	LINEAR	·	2.8 km	MPC · JPL
280128	2002 KQ_{15}	—	May 17, 2002	Palomar	NEAT	EUN	1.7 km	MPC · JPL
280129	2002 LS_{23}	—	June 8, 2002	Socorro	LINEAR	TIR	4.7 km	MPC · JPL
280130	2002 LP_{29}	—	June 7, 2002	Haleakala	NEAT	·	1.4 km	MPC · JPL
280131	2002 LU_{57}	—	June 11, 2002	Socorro	LINEAR	·	1.6 km	MPC · JPL
280132	2002 NX_{27}	—	July 13, 2002	Socorro	LINEAR	·	2.8 km	MPC · JPL
280133	2002 NG_{53}	—	July 14, 2002	Palomar	NEAT	·	1.2 km	MPC · JPL
280134	2002 NM_{58}	—	July 8, 2002	Palomar	NEAT	·	2.8 km	MPC · JPL
280135	2002 NM_{68}	—	July 14, 2002	Palomar	NEAT	·	1.1 km	MPC · JPL
280136	2002 OM_{4}	—	July 17, 2002	Palomar	NEAT	APO +1km	1.3 km	MPC · JPL
280137	2002 OE_{10}	—	July 21, 2002	Palomar	NEAT	·	3.8 km	MPC · JPL
280138	2002 OE_{18}	—	July 18, 2002	Socorro	LINEAR	H	660 m	MPC · JPL
280139	2002 PV_{8}	—	August 5, 2002	Palomar	NEAT	·	4.1 km	MPC · JPL
280140	2002 PV_{10}	—	August 5, 2002	Palomar	NEAT	·	3.0 km	MPC · JPL
280141	2002 PP_{27}	—	August 6, 2002	Palomar	NEAT	·	3.7 km	MPC · JPL
280142	2002 PQ_{29}	—	August 6, 2002	Palomar	NEAT	(16286)	2.7 km	MPC · JPL
280143	2002 PK_{35}	—	August 6, 2002	Palomar	NEAT	·	2.4 km	MPC · JPL
280144	2002 PL_{82}	—	August 9, 2002	Socorro	LINEAR	·	2.5 km	MPC · JPL
280145	2002 PC_{86}	—	August 13, 2002	Socorro	LINEAR	·	1.1 km	MPC · JPL
280146	2002 PC_{92}	—	August 14, 2002	Palomar	NEAT	BRA	2.0 km	MPC · JPL
280147	2002 PJ_{100}	—	August 14, 2002	Socorro	LINEAR	·	1.3 km	MPC · JPL
280148	2002 PL_{101}	—	August 12, 2002	Socorro	LINEAR	JUN	1.3 km	MPC · JPL
280149	2002 PG_{105}	—	August 12, 2002	Socorro	LINEAR	H	620 m	MPC · JPL
280150	2002 PJ_{110}	—	August 13, 2002	Anderson Mesa	LONEOS	·	3.8 km	MPC · JPL
280151	2002 PG_{111}	—	August 14, 2002	Palomar	NEAT	BRA	1.9 km	MPC · JPL
280152	2002 PN_{138}	—	August 8, 2002	Anderson Mesa	LONEOS	JUN	1.4 km	MPC · JPL
280153	2002 PO_{161}	—	August 8, 2002	Palomar	S. F. Hönig	·	4.0 km	MPC · JPL
280154	2002 PR_{164}	—	August 8, 2002	Palomar	S. F. Hönig	·	910 m	MPC · JPL
280155	2002 PE_{166}	—	August 8, 2002	Palomar	Lowe, A.	AST	2.0 km	MPC · JPL
280156	2002 PL_{170}	—	August 7, 2002	Palomar	NEAT	·	3.0 km	MPC · JPL
280157	2002 PA_{179}	—	August 15, 2002	Palomar	NEAT	·	900 m	MPC · JPL
280158	2002 PM_{185}	—	August 15, 2002	Palomar	NEAT	KOR	1.4 km	MPC · JPL
280159	2002 PU_{195}	—	October 17, 2003	Kitt Peak	Spacewatch	·	3.3 km	MPC · JPL
280160	2002 QA_{14}	—	August 26, 2002	Palomar	NEAT	·	2.3 km	MPC · JPL
280161	2002 QP_{35}	—	August 29, 2002	Palomar	NEAT	·	2.6 km	MPC · JPL
280162	2002 QZ_{57}	—	August 16, 2002	Palomar	R. Matson	·	1.2 km	MPC · JPL
280163	2002 QE_{68}	—	August 29, 2002	Palomar	NEAT	·	2.1 km	MPC · JPL
280164	2002 QO_{74}	—	August 30, 2002	Palomar	NEAT	·	1.5 km	MPC · JPL
280165	2002 QX_{90}	—	August 19, 2002	Palomar	NEAT	·	1.0 km	MPC · JPL
280166	2002 QV_{98}	—	August 19, 2002	Palomar	NEAT	HYG	3.4 km	MPC · JPL
280167	2002 QZ_{99}	—	August 18, 2002	Palomar	NEAT	VER	3.8 km	MPC · JPL
280168	2002 QJ_{109}	—	August 15, 2002	Palomar	NEAT	·	3.5 km	MPC · JPL
280169	2002 QO_{113}	—	August 27, 2002	Palomar	NEAT	·	2.4 km	MPC · JPL
280170	2002 RE_{17}	—	September 4, 2002	Anderson Mesa	LONEOS	KOR	2.2 km	MPC · JPL
280171	2002 RD_{20}	—	September 4, 2002	Anderson Mesa	LONEOS	·	2.3 km	MPC · JPL
280172	2002 RA_{38}	—	September 5, 2002	Anderson Mesa	LONEOS	·	1.1 km	MPC · JPL
280173	2002 RJ_{38}	—	September 5, 2002	Anderson Mesa	LONEOS	·	2.9 km	MPC · JPL
280174	2002 RY_{110}	—	September 6, 2002	Socorro	LINEAR	·	1.2 km	MPC · JPL
280175	2002 RB_{117}	—	September 7, 2002	Kleť	Kleť	·	2.7 km	MPC · JPL
280176	2002 RO_{126}	—	September 9, 2002	Palomar	NEAT	·	3.0 km	MPC · JPL
280177	2002 RH_{128}	—	September 10, 2002	Palomar	NEAT	·	5.3 km	MPC · JPL
280178	2002 RK_{128}	—	September 10, 2002	Palomar	NEAT	EUN	1.9 km	MPC · JPL
280179	2002 RB_{136}	—	September 11, 2002	Haleakala	NEAT	·	3.6 km	MPC · JPL
280180	2002 RG_{172}	—	September 13, 2002	Anderson Mesa	LONEOS	·	1.8 km	MPC · JPL
280181	2002 RP_{178}	—	September 14, 2002	Palomar	NEAT	LIX	5.5 km	MPC · JPL
280182	2002 RP_{182}	—	September 11, 2002	Palomar	NEAT	·	3.0 km	MPC · JPL
280183	2002 RW_{183}	—	September 11, 2002	Palomar	NEAT	EUP	5.8 km	MPC · JPL
280184	2002 RD_{184}	—	September 12, 2002	Palomar	NEAT	·	2.5 km	MPC · JPL
280185	2002 RG_{184}	—	September 12, 2002	Palomar	NEAT	·	4.2 km	MPC · JPL
280186	2002 RU_{202}	—	September 13, 2002	Palomar	NEAT	·	4.0 km	MPC · JPL
280187	2002 RD_{240}	—	September 14, 2002	Palomar	R. Matson	·	2.0 km	MPC · JPL
280188	2002 RW_{252}	—	September 14, 2002	Palomar	NEAT	·	840 m	MPC · JPL
280189	2002 SN_{17}	—	September 26, 2002	Palomar	NEAT	EOS	2.2 km	MPC · JPL
280190	2002 SR_{21}	—	September 26, 2002	Palomar	NEAT	·	2.1 km	MPC · JPL
280191	2002 SS_{21}	—	September 26, 2002	Palomar	NEAT	·	1.9 km	MPC · JPL
280192	2002 SM_{46}	—	September 29, 2002	Haleakala	NEAT	·	3.3 km	MPC · JPL
280193	2002 SY_{48}	—	September 30, 2002	Socorro	LINEAR	·	990 m	MPC · JPL
280194	2002 SH_{53}	—	September 18, 2002	Palomar	NEAT	·	3.8 km	MPC · JPL
280195	2002 SX_{64}	—	September 17, 2002	Palomar	NEAT	·	3.0 km	MPC · JPL
280196	2002 SG_{67}	—	September 17, 2002	Haleakala	NEAT	EOS	3.4 km	MPC · JPL
280197	2002 TE_{26}	—	October 2, 2002	Socorro	LINEAR	·	2.0 km	MPC · JPL
280198	2002 TS_{26}	—	October 2, 2002	Socorro	LINEAR	·	890 m	MPC · JPL
280199	2002 TU_{26}	—	October 2, 2002	Socorro	LINEAR	·	770 m	MPC · JPL
280200	2002 TN_{54}	—	October 2, 2002	Socorro	LINEAR	·	1.0 km	MPC · JPL

== 280201–280300 ==
back to top

Designation			Discovery			Properties		Ref
Permanent	Provisional	Named after	Date	Site	Discoverer(s)	Category	Diam.	Ref
280201	2002 TG_{130}	—	October 4, 2002	Socorro	LINEAR	(5)	1.4 km	MPC · JPL
280202	2002 TX_{132}	—	October 4, 2002	Palomar	NEAT	EOS	2.8 km	MPC · JPL
280203	2002 TK_{134}	—	October 4, 2002	Palomar	NEAT	V	690 m	MPC · JPL
280204	2002 TH_{147}	—	October 4, 2002	Anderson Mesa	LONEOS	·	2.7 km	MPC · JPL
280205	2002 TF_{178}	—	October 12, 2002	Socorro	LINEAR	·	840 m	MPC · JPL
280206	2002 TF_{184}	—	October 4, 2002	Socorro	LINEAR	·	3.0 km	MPC · JPL
280207	2002 TK_{208}	—	October 4, 2002	Socorro	LINEAR	·	3.9 km	MPC · JPL
280208	2002 TL_{214}	—	October 4, 2002	Socorro	LINEAR	·	990 m	MPC · JPL
280209	2002 TB_{223}	—	October 7, 2002	Socorro	LINEAR	EOS	2.7 km	MPC · JPL
280210	2002 TB_{255}	—	October 4, 2002	Socorro	LINEAR	·	1.4 km	MPC · JPL
280211	2002 TB_{261}	—	October 9, 2002	Socorro	LINEAR	·	1.2 km	MPC · JPL
280212	2002 TH_{271}	—	October 9, 2002	Socorro	LINEAR	·	1.1 km	MPC · JPL
280213	2002 TC_{277}	—	October 10, 2002	Palomar	NEAT	·	6.1 km	MPC · JPL
280214	2002 TM_{288}	—	October 10, 2002	Socorro	LINEAR	·	2.9 km	MPC · JPL
280215	2002 TW_{290}	—	October 10, 2002	Socorro	LINEAR	·	1.2 km	MPC · JPL
280216	2002 TQ_{302}	—	October 8, 2002	Anderson Mesa	LONEOS	·	2.7 km	MPC · JPL
280217	2002 TT_{309}	—	October 4, 2002	Apache Point	SDSS	·	860 m	MPC · JPL
280218	2002 TU_{317}	—	October 5, 2002	Apache Point	SDSS	·	1.6 km	MPC · JPL
280219	2002 TV_{339}	—	October 5, 2002	Apache Point	SDSS	·	3.5 km	MPC · JPL
280220	2002 TY_{358}	—	April 11, 2005	Mount Lemmon	Mount Lemmon Survey	·	2.0 km	MPC · JPL
280221	2002 TN_{369}	—	October 10, 2002	Apache Point	SDSS	·	3.3 km	MPC · JPL
280222	2002 US_{21}	—	October 30, 2002	Palomar	NEAT	·	910 m	MPC · JPL
280223	2002 UV_{28}	—	October 31, 2002	Socorro	LINEAR	·	930 m	MPC · JPL
280224	2002 UM_{54}	—	October 29, 2002	Apache Point	SDSS	·	3.8 km	MPC · JPL
280225	2002 UT_{58}	—	October 29, 2002	Apache Point	SDSS	EOS	2.6 km	MPC · JPL
280226	2002 UD_{66}	—	October 30, 2002	Apache Point	SDSS	·	2.4 km	MPC · JPL
280227	2002 UX_{67}	—	October 30, 2002	Apache Point	SDSS	·	860 m	MPC · JPL
280228	2002 UF_{75}	—	October 31, 2002	Palomar	NEAT	·	910 m	MPC · JPL
280229	2002 UK_{77}	—	October 31, 2002	Palomar	NEAT	·	3.7 km	MPC · JPL
280230	2002 VQ_{8}	—	November 1, 2002	Palomar	NEAT	·	4.3 km	MPC · JPL
280231	2002 VJ_{19}	—	November 4, 2002	Palomar	NEAT	·	880 m	MPC · JPL
280232	2002 VT_{22}	—	November 5, 2002	Socorro	LINEAR	·	1.2 km	MPC · JPL
280233	2002 VR_{25}	—	November 5, 2002	Socorro	LINEAR	·	850 m	MPC · JPL
280234	2002 VM_{30}	—	November 5, 2002	Socorro	LINEAR	·	5.3 km	MPC · JPL
280235	2002 VN_{30}	—	November 5, 2002	Socorro	LINEAR	·	5.1 km	MPC · JPL
280236	2002 VQ_{34}	—	November 5, 2002	Socorro	LINEAR	·	1.2 km	MPC · JPL
280237	2002 VT_{39}	—	November 5, 2002	Socorro	LINEAR	·	2.6 km	MPC · JPL
280238	2002 VA_{74}	—	November 7, 2002	Socorro	LINEAR	·	880 m	MPC · JPL
280239	2002 VE_{79}	—	November 7, 2002	Socorro	LINEAR	·	4.5 km	MPC · JPL
280240	2002 VD_{99}	—	November 13, 2002	Kitt Peak	Spacewatch	·	3.6 km	MPC · JPL
280241	2002 VW_{141}	—	November 6, 2002	Haleakala	NEAT	THM	3.2 km	MPC · JPL
280242	2002 VK_{142}	—	November 5, 2002	Palomar	NEAT	·	5.0 km	MPC · JPL
280243	2002 VL_{145}	—	November 4, 2002	Palomar	NEAT	·	2.1 km	MPC · JPL
280244 Ati	2002 WP_{11}	Ati	November 27, 2002	Campo Imperatore	CINEOS	AMO +1km	810 m	MPC · JPL
280245	2002 WZ_{25}	—	November 16, 2002	Palomar	NEAT	·	3.0 km	MPC · JPL
280246	2002 WS_{26}	—	November 22, 2002	Palomar	NEAT	·	900 m	MPC · JPL
280247	2002 WG_{28}	—	November 16, 2002	Palomar	NEAT	·	3.4 km	MPC · JPL
280248	2002 WX_{28}	—	November 22, 2002	Palomar	NEAT	·	4.0 km	MPC · JPL
280249	2002 XR_{1}	—	December 1, 2002	Socorro	LINEAR	·	4.2 km	MPC · JPL
280250	2002 XY_{10}	—	December 3, 2002	Palomar	NEAT	·	4.5 km	MPC · JPL
280251	2002 XR_{12}	—	December 3, 2002	Palomar	NEAT	·	1.2 km	MPC · JPL
280252	2002 XK_{14}	—	December 5, 2002	Socorro	LINEAR	·	1.1 km	MPC · JPL
280253	2002 XM_{46}	—	December 7, 2002	Socorro	LINEAR	·	2.3 km	MPC · JPL
280254	2002 XP_{49}	—	December 10, 2002	Socorro	LINEAR	·	4.9 km	MPC · JPL
280255	2002 XJ_{53}	—	December 10, 2002	Palomar	NEAT	·	3.6 km	MPC · JPL
280256	2002 XL_{61}	—	December 10, 2002	Palomar	NEAT	·	1.1 km	MPC · JPL
280257	2002 XD_{74}	—	December 11, 2002	Socorro	LINEAR	·	1.8 km	MPC · JPL
280258	2002 XY_{81}	—	December 11, 2002	Socorro	LINEAR	·	1.4 km	MPC · JPL
280259	2002 XA_{94}	—	December 3, 2002	Palomar	S. F. Hönig	(31811)	4.1 km	MPC · JPL
280260	2002 XD_{95}	—	December 5, 2002	Socorro	LINEAR	·	3.4 km	MPC · JPL
280261	2002 XE_{97}	—	December 5, 2002	Socorro	LINEAR	·	5.4 km	MPC · JPL
280262	2002 XD_{105}	—	December 5, 2002	Socorro	LINEAR	·	1.1 km	MPC · JPL
280263	2002 XR_{113}	—	December 7, 2002	Kitt Peak	M. W. Buie	·	1.3 km	MPC · JPL
280264	2002 XO_{117}	—	December 13, 2002	Palomar	NEAT	·	3.0 km	MPC · JPL
280265	2002 XU_{120}	—	December 3, 2002	Palomar	NEAT	·	4.2 km	MPC · JPL
280266	2002 YH_{3}	—	December 28, 2002	Nashville	Clingan, R.	EOS	2.5 km	MPC · JPL
280267	2003 AC_{25}	—	January 4, 2003	Socorro	LINEAR	PHO	1.4 km	MPC · JPL
280268	2003 AL_{28}	—	January 4, 2003	Socorro	LINEAR	V	1.0 km	MPC · JPL
280269	2003 AK_{38}	—	January 7, 2003	Socorro	LINEAR	·	1.3 km	MPC · JPL
280270	2003 AG_{39}	—	January 7, 2003	Socorro	LINEAR	·	1.0 km	MPC · JPL
280271	2003 AW_{91}	—	January 6, 2003	Kitt Peak	Spacewatch	·	2.8 km	MPC · JPL
280272	2003 BF_{28}	—	January 26, 2003	Anderson Mesa	LONEOS	HNS	1.7 km	MPC · JPL
280273	2003 BN_{34}	—	January 26, 2003	Haleakala	NEAT	V	880 m	MPC · JPL
280274	2003 BZ_{65}	—	January 30, 2003	Socorro	LINEAR	·	1.5 km	MPC · JPL
280275	2003 CX_{1}	—	February 1, 2003	Anderson Mesa	LONEOS	·	1.6 km	MPC · JPL
280276	2003 CV_{5}	—	February 1, 2003	Socorro	LINEAR	·	1.5 km	MPC · JPL
280277	2003 CD_{8}	—	February 1, 2003	Socorro	LINEAR	·	1.8 km	MPC · JPL
280278	2003 DS_{1}	—	February 21, 2003	Palomar	NEAT	·	1.2 km	MPC · JPL
280279	2003 EO_{18}	—	March 6, 2003	Anderson Mesa	LONEOS	·	1.2 km	MPC · JPL
280280	2003 EB_{22}	—	March 6, 2003	Socorro	LINEAR	·	2.1 km	MPC · JPL
280281	2003 FF_{1}	—	March 22, 2003	Ondřejov	L. Kotková	·	2.2 km	MPC · JPL
280282	2003 FK_{3}	—	March 24, 2003	Socorro	LINEAR	H	980 m	MPC · JPL
280283	2003 FG_{45}	—	March 24, 2003	Kitt Peak	Spacewatch	(194)	1.9 km	MPC · JPL
280284	2003 FS_{76}	—	March 27, 2003	Palomar	NEAT	·	1.6 km	MPC · JPL
280285	2003 FQ_{107}	—	March 30, 2003	Socorro	LINEAR	·	2.2 km	MPC · JPL
280286	2003 GU_{1}	—	April 2, 2003	Haleakala	NEAT	·	1.7 km	MPC · JPL
280287	2003 GM_{22}	—	April 7, 2003	Socorro	LINEAR	H	710 m	MPC · JPL
280288	2003 HW_{14}	—	April 26, 2003	Haleakala	NEAT	·	2.5 km	MPC · JPL
280289	2003 HX_{44}	—	April 29, 2003	Kitt Peak	Spacewatch	NYS	1.4 km	MPC · JPL
280290	2003 HK_{50}	—	April 29, 2003	Anderson Mesa	LONEOS	·	1.4 km	MPC · JPL
280291	2003 HM_{58}	—	April 29, 2003	Kitt Peak	Spacewatch	PHO	3.3 km	MPC · JPL
280292	2003 MF_{10}	—	June 29, 2003	Socorro	LINEAR	·	2.7 km	MPC · JPL
280293	2003 ML_{10}	—	June 21, 2003	Socorro	LINEAR	H	790 m	MPC · JPL
280294	2003 NH_{10}	—	July 3, 2003	Kitt Peak	Spacewatch	·	1.5 km	MPC · JPL
280295	2003 OR_{8}	—	July 26, 2003	Reedy Creek	J. Broughton	·	2.3 km	MPC · JPL
280296	2003 OQ_{9}	—	July 25, 2003	Socorro	LINEAR	(5)	1.9 km	MPC · JPL
280297	2003 OQ_{25}	—	July 24, 2003	Palomar	NEAT	·	1.3 km	MPC · JPL
280298	2003 OV_{26}	—	July 24, 2003	Palomar	NEAT	fast	1.5 km	MPC · JPL
280299	2003 PY_{6}	—	August 1, 2003	Socorro	LINEAR	JUN	1.4 km	MPC · JPL
280300	2003 QA_{16}	—	August 20, 2003	Palomar	NEAT	·	2.3 km	MPC · JPL

== 280301–280400 ==
back to top

Designation			Discovery			Properties		Ref
Permanent	Provisional	Named after	Date	Site	Discoverer(s)	Category	Diam.	Ref
280301	2003 QM_{23}	—	August 20, 2003	Campo Imperatore	CINEOS	·	1.9 km	MPC · JPL
280302	2003 QB_{25}	—	August 22, 2003	Palomar	NEAT	EUN	1.5 km	MPC · JPL
280303	2003 QJ_{30}	—	August 24, 2003	Reedy Creek	J. Broughton	·	2.1 km	MPC · JPL
280304	2003 QM_{30}	—	August 22, 2003	Palomar	NEAT	·	1.8 km	MPC · JPL
280305	2003 QJ_{32}	—	August 21, 2003	Palomar	NEAT	EUN	1.8 km	MPC · JPL
280306	2003 QQ_{40}	—	August 22, 2003	Socorro	LINEAR	·	1.6 km	MPC · JPL
280307	2003 QK_{49}	—	August 22, 2003	Palomar	NEAT	ADE	2.5 km	MPC · JPL
280308	2003 QP_{58}	—	August 23, 2003	Palomar	NEAT	NEM	3.1 km	MPC · JPL
280309	2003 QM_{66}	—	August 22, 2003	Socorro	LINEAR	H	890 m	MPC · JPL
280310	2003 QD_{70}	—	August 27, 2003	Palomar	NEAT	·	2.7 km	MPC · JPL
280311	2003 QP_{77}	—	August 24, 2003	Socorro	LINEAR	·	2.0 km	MPC · JPL
280312	2003 QJ_{87}	—	August 25, 2003	Socorro	LINEAR	·	3.5 km	MPC · JPL
280313	2003 QA_{89}	—	August 26, 2003	Cerro Tololo	M. W. Buie	·	2.4 km	MPC · JPL
280314	2003 QP_{99}	—	August 29, 2003	Haleakala	NEAT	·	2.7 km	MPC · JPL
280315	2003 QS_{102}	—	August 31, 2003	Kitt Peak	Spacewatch	·	1.3 km	MPC · JPL
280316	2003 QW_{119}	—	August 26, 2003	Cerro Tololo	M. W. Buie	·	1.9 km	MPC · JPL
280317	2003 RF_{1}	—	September 2, 2003	Socorro	LINEAR	·	2.4 km	MPC · JPL
280318	2003 RQ_{18}	—	September 15, 2003	Anderson Mesa	LONEOS	·	1.5 km	MPC · JPL
280319	2003 RK_{19}	—	September 15, 2003	Anderson Mesa	LONEOS	AEO	1.7 km	MPC · JPL
280320	2003 RD_{20}	—	September 15, 2003	Anderson Mesa	LONEOS	·	1.9 km	MPC · JPL
280321	2003 RF_{21}	—	September 15, 2003	Anderson Mesa	LONEOS	·	3.7 km	MPC · JPL
280322	2003 RX_{24}	—	September 15, 2003	Palomar	NEAT	·	1.6 km	MPC · JPL
280323	2003 RM_{26}	—	September 15, 2003	Palomar	NEAT	·	2.7 km	MPC · JPL
280324	2003 SQ_{6}	—	September 17, 2003	Desert Eagle	W. K. Y. Yeung	·	2.6 km	MPC · JPL
280325	2003 SK_{20}	—	September 16, 2003	Kitt Peak	Spacewatch	·	1.7 km	MPC · JPL
280326	2003 SN_{34}	—	September 18, 2003	Kitt Peak	Spacewatch	·	2.3 km	MPC · JPL
280327	2003 SE_{35}	—	September 18, 2003	Kitt Peak	Spacewatch	AGN	1.2 km	MPC · JPL
280328	2003 SO_{58}	—	September 17, 2003	Anderson Mesa	LONEOS	·	2.2 km	MPC · JPL
280329	2003 SQ_{67}	—	September 19, 2003	Socorro	LINEAR	·	2.9 km	MPC · JPL
280330	2003 SF_{69}	—	September 17, 2003	Kitt Peak	Spacewatch	AEO	1.5 km	MPC · JPL
280331	2003 SF_{79}	—	September 19, 2003	Kitt Peak	Spacewatch	·	2.6 km	MPC · JPL
280332	2003 SL_{79}	—	September 19, 2003	Kitt Peak	Spacewatch	·	3.1 km	MPC · JPL
280333	2003 SD_{80}	—	September 19, 2003	Haleakala	NEAT	·	2.7 km	MPC · JPL
280334	2003 SL_{99}	—	September 19, 2003	Haleakala	NEAT	·	2.5 km	MPC · JPL
280335	2003 SX_{109}	—	September 20, 2003	Palomar	NEAT	615	2.0 km	MPC · JPL
280336	2003 SV_{129}	—	September 21, 2003	Desert Eagle	W. K. Y. Yeung	·	2.9 km	MPC · JPL
280337	2003 SK_{138}	—	September 19, 2003	Campo Imperatore	CINEOS	EOS	2.6 km	MPC · JPL
280338	2003 SN_{140}	—	September 19, 2003	Palomar	NEAT	·	3.9 km	MPC · JPL
280339	2003 SH_{153}	—	September 19, 2003	Anderson Mesa	LONEOS	NEM	2.7 km	MPC · JPL
280340	2003 SX_{159}	—	September 19, 2003	Campo Imperatore	CINEOS	AGN	1.9 km	MPC · JPL
280341	2003 ST_{169}	—	September 23, 2003	Haleakala	NEAT	·	3.4 km	MPC · JPL
280342	2003 SL_{172}	—	September 18, 2003	Socorro	LINEAR	·	2.4 km	MPC · JPL
280343	2003 SA_{176}	—	September 18, 2003	Palomar	NEAT	·	4.1 km	MPC · JPL
280344	2003 SG_{197}	—	September 21, 2003	Anderson Mesa	LONEOS	AGN	1.7 km	MPC · JPL
280345	2003 SJ_{210}	—	September 26, 2003	Socorro	LINEAR	·	2.3 km	MPC · JPL
280346	2003 SD_{224}	—	September 24, 2003	Bergisch Gladbach	W. Bickel	·	2.2 km	MPC · JPL
280347	2003 SB_{228}	—	September 27, 2003	Socorro	LINEAR	AGN	1.6 km	MPC · JPL
280348	2003 SA_{231}	—	September 24, 2003	Palomar	NEAT	NEM	3.0 km	MPC · JPL
280349	2003 SK_{255}	—	September 27, 2003	Kitt Peak	Spacewatch	·	2.3 km	MPC · JPL
280350	2003 SB_{260}	—	September 28, 2003	Kitt Peak	Spacewatch	GEF	1.8 km	MPC · JPL
280351	2003 SH_{279}	—	September 22, 2003	Anderson Mesa	LONEOS	NEM	2.4 km	MPC · JPL
280352	2003 SU_{280}	—	September 18, 2003	Palomar	NEAT	·	2.1 km	MPC · JPL
280353	2003 SP_{281}	—	September 19, 2003	Kitt Peak	Spacewatch	·	2.4 km	MPC · JPL
280354	2003 SL_{296}	—	September 29, 2003	Anderson Mesa	LONEOS	·	4.2 km	MPC · JPL
280355	2003 SM_{298}	—	September 18, 2003	Haleakala	NEAT	·	2.7 km	MPC · JPL
280356	2003 SY_{300}	—	September 17, 2003	Palomar	NEAT	·	3.8 km	MPC · JPL
280357	2003 SZ_{300}	—	September 17, 2003	Palomar	NEAT	·	2.0 km	MPC · JPL
280358	2003 SN_{320}	—	September 17, 2003	Kitt Peak	Spacewatch	·	2.2 km	MPC · JPL
280359	2003 SO_{320}	—	September 17, 2003	Palomar	NEAT	·	1.9 km	MPC · JPL
280360	2003 SZ_{329}	—	September 26, 2003	Apache Point	SDSS	·	1.7 km	MPC · JPL
280361	2003 SJ_{332}	—	September 28, 2003	Anderson Mesa	LONEOS	NEM ·	3.0 km	MPC · JPL
280362	2003 SL_{388}	—	December 19, 2004	Kitt Peak	Spacewatch	AGN	1.4 km	MPC · JPL
280363	2003 SE_{391}	—	September 26, 2003	Apache Point	SDSS	HOF	3.2 km	MPC · JPL
280364	2003 SC_{430}	—	September 29, 2003	Kitt Peak	Spacewatch	·	4.0 km	MPC · JPL
280365	2003 SR_{430}	—	September 22, 2003	Kitt Peak	Spacewatch	·	3.1 km	MPC · JPL
280366	2003 TE	—	October 1, 2003	Anderson Mesa	LONEOS	·	2.6 km	MPC · JPL
280367	2003 TN_{11}	—	October 14, 2003	Anderson Mesa	LONEOS	·	3.2 km	MPC · JPL
280368	2003 TB_{15}	—	October 15, 2003	Anderson Mesa	LONEOS	·	3.2 km	MPC · JPL
280369	2003 TU_{46}	—	October 3, 2003	Kitt Peak	Spacewatch	·	3.3 km	MPC · JPL
280370	2003 TA_{54}	—	October 5, 2003	Kitt Peak	Spacewatch	·	2.6 km	MPC · JPL
280371	2003 UV_{7}	—	October 18, 2003	Kleť	Kleť	·	2.6 km	MPC · JPL
280372	2003 UQ_{16}	—	October 16, 2003	Palomar	NEAT	JUN	2.0 km	MPC · JPL
280373	2003 UV_{22}	—	October 19, 2003	Kitt Peak	Spacewatch	·	3.9 km	MPC · JPL
280374	2003 UR_{26}	—	October 25, 2003	Goodricke-Pigott	R. A. Tucker	·	3.4 km	MPC · JPL
280375	2003 UB_{27}	—	October 23, 2003	Goodricke-Pigott	R. A. Tucker	·	2.5 km	MPC · JPL
280376	2003 UF_{46}	—	October 18, 2003	Kitt Peak	Spacewatch	·	2.8 km	MPC · JPL
280377	2003 UR_{64}	—	October 16, 2003	Anderson Mesa	LONEOS	·	3.5 km	MPC · JPL
280378	2003 UE_{78}	—	October 17, 2003	Anderson Mesa	LONEOS	·	2.3 km	MPC · JPL
280379	2003 UJ_{79}	—	October 19, 2003	Anderson Mesa	LONEOS	·	1.9 km	MPC · JPL
280380	2003 UZ_{79}	—	October 17, 2003	Goodricke-Pigott	R. A. Tucker	·	2.7 km	MPC · JPL
280381	2003 UK_{91}	—	October 20, 2003	Socorro	LINEAR	·	3.0 km	MPC · JPL
280382	2003 UM_{97}	—	October 19, 2003	Kitt Peak	Spacewatch	PHO	1.3 km	MPC · JPL
280383	2003 UZ_{106}	—	October 18, 2003	Palomar	NEAT	·	3.4 km	MPC · JPL
280384	2003 UW_{118}	—	October 18, 2003	Kitt Peak	Spacewatch	AGN	1.7 km	MPC · JPL
280385	2003 UT_{120}	—	October 18, 2003	Kitt Peak	Spacewatch	AGN	1.3 km	MPC · JPL
280386	2003 UL_{143}	—	October 18, 2003	Anderson Mesa	LONEOS	GEF	2.0 km	MPC · JPL
280387	2003 UJ_{175}	—	October 21, 2003	Anderson Mesa	LONEOS	·	2.8 km	MPC · JPL
280388	2003 UO_{176}	—	October 21, 2003	Palomar	NEAT	MIS	2.8 km	MPC · JPL
280389	2003 UF_{182}	—	October 21, 2003	Palomar	NEAT	AGN	1.5 km	MPC · JPL
280390	2003 UH_{197}	—	October 21, 2003	Kitt Peak	Spacewatch	·	2.3 km	MPC · JPL
280391	2003 UK_{199}	—	October 21, 2003	Palomar	NEAT	MAS	830 m	MPC · JPL
280392	2003 UR_{238}	—	October 24, 2003	Socorro	LINEAR	·	3.0 km	MPC · JPL
280393	2003 UG_{249}	—	October 25, 2003	Socorro	LINEAR	·	3.0 km	MPC · JPL
280394	2003 UA_{269}	—	October 28, 2003	Kitt Peak	Spacewatch	·	2.0 km	MPC · JPL
280395	2003 UG_{272}	—	October 29, 2003	Kitt Peak	Spacewatch	·	4.3 km	MPC · JPL
280396	2003 UP_{297}	—	October 16, 2003	Kitt Peak	Spacewatch	AGN	1.3 km	MPC · JPL
280397	2003 UH_{314}	—	October 16, 2003	Palomar	NEAT	·	1.9 km	MPC · JPL
280398	2003 UY_{317}	—	October 19, 2003	Apache Point	SDSS	AST	1.9 km	MPC · JPL
280399	2003 UO_{324}	—	October 17, 2003	Apache Point	SDSS	H	630 m	MPC · JPL
280400	2003 UW_{327}	—	October 17, 2003	Apache Point	SDSS	·	2.4 km	MPC · JPL

== 280401–280500 ==
back to top

Designation			Discovery			Properties		Ref
Permanent	Provisional	Named after	Date	Site	Discoverer(s)	Category	Diam.	Ref
280401	2003 UB_{346}	—	October 19, 2003	Apache Point	SDSS	·	1.7 km	MPC · JPL
280402	2003 UF_{352}	—	October 19, 2003	Apache Point	SDSS	·	2.3 km	MPC · JPL
280403	2003 UT_{377}	—	October 22, 2003	Apache Point	SDSS	·	2.1 km	MPC · JPL
280404	2003 VS_{10}	—	November 15, 2003	Kitt Peak	Spacewatch	KOR	2.1 km	MPC · JPL
280405	2003 WP_{13}	—	November 16, 2003	Kitt Peak	Spacewatch	AGN	1.6 km	MPC · JPL
280406	2003 WZ_{22}	—	November 18, 2003	Kitt Peak	Spacewatch	·	4.0 km	MPC · JPL
280407	2003 WY_{53}	—	November 20, 2003	Socorro	LINEAR	·	2.7 km	MPC · JPL
280408	2003 WP_{59}	—	November 18, 2003	Kitt Peak	Spacewatch	·	2.1 km	MPC · JPL
280409	2003 WU_{85}	—	November 20, 2003	Socorro	LINEAR	·	3.0 km	MPC · JPL
280410	2003 WJ_{86}	—	November 21, 2003	Socorro	LINEAR	·	900 m	MPC · JPL
280411	2003 WZ_{95}	—	November 19, 2003	Anderson Mesa	LONEOS	·	2.0 km	MPC · JPL
280412	2003 WC_{132}	—	November 19, 2003	Kitt Peak	Spacewatch	·	3.1 km	MPC · JPL
280413	2003 WH_{133}	—	November 21, 2003	Socorro	LINEAR	·	3.8 km	MPC · JPL
280414	2003 WP_{140}	—	November 21, 2003	Socorro	LINEAR	·	3.9 km	MPC · JPL
280415	2003 WT_{156}	—	November 29, 2003	Kitt Peak	Spacewatch	CYB	6.0 km	MPC · JPL
280416	2003 WK_{192}	—	November 19, 2003	Socorro	LINEAR	THB	4.0 km	MPC · JPL
280417	2003 XH_{3}	—	December 1, 2003	Socorro	LINEAR	·	6.3 km	MPC · JPL
280418	2003 XP_{14}	—	December 4, 2003	Socorro	LINEAR	·	4.5 km	MPC · JPL
280419	2003 XE_{31}	—	December 1, 2003	Kitt Peak	Spacewatch	·	2.8 km	MPC · JPL
280420	2003 YN_{17}	—	December 19, 2003	Socorro	LINEAR	·	4.0 km	MPC · JPL
280421	2003 YR_{18}	—	December 17, 2003	Kitt Peak	Spacewatch	·	2.0 km	MPC · JPL
280422	2003 YA_{21}	—	December 17, 2003	Kitt Peak	Spacewatch	·	4.0 km	MPC · JPL
280423	2003 YQ_{24}	—	December 17, 2003	Kitt Peak	Spacewatch	HYG	5.1 km	MPC · JPL
280424	2003 YK_{43}	—	December 19, 2003	Socorro	LINEAR	·	4.2 km	MPC · JPL
280425	2003 YR_{52}	—	December 19, 2003	Kitt Peak	Spacewatch	(5)	1.8 km	MPC · JPL
280426	2003 YD_{56}	—	December 19, 2003	Socorro	LINEAR	·	3.0 km	MPC · JPL
280427	2003 YH_{56}	—	December 19, 2003	Socorro	LINEAR	·	4.2 km	MPC · JPL
280428	2003 YW_{84}	—	December 19, 2003	Kitt Peak	Spacewatch	·	2.9 km	MPC · JPL
280429	2003 YX_{84}	—	December 19, 2003	Kitt Peak	Spacewatch	THB	5.6 km	MPC · JPL
280430	2003 YO_{93}	—	December 21, 2003	Kitt Peak	Spacewatch	NYS	1.4 km	MPC · JPL
280431	2003 YQ_{104}	—	December 21, 2003	Kitt Peak	Spacewatch	·	3.1 km	MPC · JPL
280432	2003 YF_{106}	—	December 22, 2003	Socorro	LINEAR	·	2.7 km	MPC · JPL
280433	2003 YV_{120}	—	December 27, 2003	Socorro	LINEAR	·	2.6 km	MPC · JPL
280434	2003 YH_{134}	—	December 28, 2003	Socorro	LINEAR	·	5.8 km	MPC · JPL
280435	2003 YZ_{140}	—	December 28, 2003	Socorro	LINEAR	T_{j} (2.98)	4.4 km	MPC · JPL
280436	2003 YE_{141}	—	December 28, 2003	Socorro	LINEAR	EOS	4.9 km	MPC · JPL
280437	2003 YU_{141}	—	December 28, 2003	Socorro	LINEAR	·	970 m	MPC · JPL
280438	2003 YR_{164}	—	December 17, 2003	Kitt Peak	Spacewatch	KOR	2.1 km	MPC · JPL
280439	2003 YP_{169}	—	December 18, 2003	Socorro	LINEAR	EOS	2.9 km	MPC · JPL
280440	2004 AF_{7}	—	January 13, 2004	Anderson Mesa	LONEOS	·	5.3 km	MPC · JPL
280441	2004 BS_{72}	—	January 23, 2004	Socorro	LINEAR	·	4.2 km	MPC · JPL
280442	2004 BA_{86}	—	January 29, 2004	Socorro	LINEAR	PHO	1.6 km	MPC · JPL
280443	2004 BO_{96}	—	January 24, 2004	Socorro	LINEAR	EMA	4.7 km	MPC · JPL
280444	2004 BG_{119}	—	January 30, 2004	Anderson Mesa	LONEOS	·	1.2 km	MPC · JPL
280445	2004 BJ_{125}	—	January 16, 2004	Kitt Peak	Spacewatch	·	2.8 km	MPC · JPL
280446	2004 CO_{39}	—	February 14, 2004	Bareggio	Bareggio	·	4.3 km	MPC · JPL
280447	2004 CU_{73}	—	February 15, 2004	Socorro	LINEAR	·	3.5 km	MPC · JPL
280448	2004 CL_{75}	—	February 11, 2004	Palomar	NEAT	HOF	3.8 km	MPC · JPL
280449	2004 CO_{106}	—	February 14, 2004	Palomar	NEAT	·	900 m	MPC · JPL
280450	2004 CB_{129}	—	February 14, 2004	Kitt Peak	Spacewatch	·	3.6 km	MPC · JPL
280451	2004 DJ_{11}	—	February 16, 2004	Kitt Peak	Spacewatch	·	1.3 km	MPC · JPL
280452	2004 DX_{25}	—	February 16, 2004	Socorro	LINEAR	·	770 m	MPC · JPL
280453	2004 DG_{26}	—	February 16, 2004	Kitt Peak	Spacewatch	·	880 m	MPC · JPL
280454	2004 EO	—	March 11, 2004	Palomar	NEAT	·	920 m	MPC · JPL
280455	2004 EA_{17}	—	March 12, 2004	Palomar	NEAT	·	890 m	MPC · JPL
280456	2004 EG_{49}	—	March 15, 2004	Kitt Peak	Spacewatch	·	1.1 km	MPC · JPL
280457	2004 EV_{57}	—	March 15, 2004	Kitt Peak	Spacewatch	·	820 m	MPC · JPL
280458	2004 ER_{69}	—	March 15, 2004	Kitt Peak	Spacewatch	MAS	720 m	MPC · JPL
280459	2004 EG_{86}	—	March 15, 2004	Socorro	LINEAR	·	1.1 km	MPC · JPL
280460	2004 EH_{86}	—	March 15, 2004	Socorro	LINEAR	·	1.2 km	MPC · JPL
280461	2004 FQ_{12}	—	March 16, 2004	Catalina	CSS	·	1.0 km	MPC · JPL
280462	2004 FY_{52}	—	March 19, 2004	Socorro	LINEAR	·	1.1 km	MPC · JPL
280463	2004 FW_{78}	—	March 19, 2004	Kitt Peak	Spacewatch	·	930 m	MPC · JPL
280464	2004 FV_{91}	—	March 22, 2004	Socorro	LINEAR	·	910 m	MPC · JPL
280465	2004 FT_{92}	—	March 18, 2004	Socorro	LINEAR	·	1.4 km	MPC · JPL
280466	2004 FL_{93}	—	March 21, 2004	Nogales	Tenagra II	·	1.0 km	MPC · JPL
280467	2004 FS_{95}	—	March 23, 2004	Socorro	LINEAR	·	960 m	MPC · JPL
280468	2004 FN_{97}	—	March 23, 2004	Socorro	LINEAR	·	1.1 km	MPC · JPL
280469	2004 GL_{10}	—	April 12, 2004	Kitt Peak	Spacewatch	·	1.6 km	MPC · JPL
280470	2004 GF_{25}	—	April 14, 2004	Kitt Peak	Spacewatch	·	1.3 km	MPC · JPL
280471	2004 GT_{25}	—	April 14, 2004	Kitt Peak	Spacewatch	·	790 m	MPC · JPL
280472	2004 GL_{46}	—	April 12, 2004	Kitt Peak	Spacewatch	·	1.2 km	MPC · JPL
280473	2004 GG_{71}	—	April 13, 2004	Kitt Peak	Spacewatch	·	1.1 km	MPC · JPL
280474	2004 HY_{2}	—	April 16, 2004	Socorro	LINEAR	·	1.4 km	MPC · JPL
280475	2004 HW_{6}	—	April 16, 2004	Socorro	LINEAR	·	1.2 km	MPC · JPL
280476	2004 HJ_{17}	—	April 16, 2004	Palomar	NEAT	·	1.3 km	MPC · JPL
280477	2004 HU_{25}	—	April 19, 2004	Socorro	LINEAR	·	1.1 km	MPC · JPL
280478	2004 HB_{36}	—	April 21, 2004	Catalina	CSS	·	860 m	MPC · JPL
280479	2004 HG_{41}	—	April 19, 2004	Socorro	LINEAR	·	960 m	MPC · JPL
280480	2004 HN_{45}	—	April 21, 2004	Socorro	LINEAR	(2076)	920 m	MPC · JPL
280481	2004 HL_{48}	—	April 22, 2004	Siding Spring	SSS	·	1.7 km	MPC · JPL
280482	2004 HK_{59}	—	April 25, 2004	Kitt Peak	Spacewatch	·	920 m	MPC · JPL
280483	2004 JM_{12}	—	May 13, 2004	Socorro	LINEAR	PHO	3.5 km	MPC · JPL
280484	2004 JO_{35}	—	May 15, 2004	Socorro	LINEAR	·	1.1 km	MPC · JPL
280485	2004 LA_{15}	—	June 11, 2004	Palomar	NEAT	·	1.1 km	MPC · JPL
280486	2004 LM_{20}	—	June 12, 2004	Socorro	LINEAR	·	1.1 km	MPC · JPL
280487	2004 LO_{29}	—	June 14, 2004	Kitt Peak	Spacewatch	·	1.4 km	MPC · JPL
280488	2004 LL_{31}	—	June 12, 2004	Anderson Mesa	LONEOS	·	1.4 km	MPC · JPL
280489	2004 ML_{5}	—	June 22, 2004	Kitt Peak	Spacewatch	·	1.5 km	MPC · JPL
280490	2004 MO_{6}	—	June 25, 2004	Kitt Peak	Spacewatch	·	1.7 km	MPC · JPL
280491	2004 MO_{7}	—	June 16, 2004	Mauna Kea	D. J. Tholen	APO	520 m	MPC · JPL
280492	2004 NG_{2}	—	July 9, 2004	Siding Spring	SSS	NYS	1.2 km	MPC · JPL
280493	2004 NF_{5}	—	July 9, 2004	Palomar	NEAT	·	1.6 km	MPC · JPL
280494	2004 NN_{9}	—	July 9, 2004	Socorro	LINEAR	NYS	1.3 km	MPC · JPL
280495	2004 NV_{14}	—	July 11, 2004	Socorro	LINEAR	NYS	1.4 km	MPC · JPL
280496	2004 NS_{20}	—	July 14, 2004	Socorro	LINEAR	·	1.6 km	MPC · JPL
280497	2004 NE_{21}	—	July 14, 2004	Socorro	LINEAR	ERI	1.7 km	MPC · JPL
280498	2004 NF_{23}	—	July 11, 2004	Socorro	LINEAR	·	1.2 km	MPC · JPL
280499	2004 NU_{32}	—	July 11, 2004	Palomar	NEAT	PHO	1.3 km	MPC · JPL
280500	2004 OZ_{3}	—	July 17, 2004	Socorro	LINEAR	EUN	1.8 km	MPC · JPL

== 280501–280600 ==
back to top

Designation			Discovery			Properties		Ref
Permanent	Provisional	Named after	Date	Site	Discoverer(s)	Category	Diam.	Ref
280501	2004 OB_{10}	—	July 21, 2004	Reedy Creek	J. Broughton	NYS	1.2 km	MPC · JPL
280502	2004 PD_{3}	—	August 3, 2004	Siding Spring	SSS	NYS	1.4 km	MPC · JPL
280503	2004 PY_{3}	—	August 3, 2004	Siding Spring	SSS	MAS	760 m	MPC · JPL
280504	2004 PK_{5}	—	August 6, 2004	Palomar	NEAT	·	1.7 km	MPC · JPL
280505	2004 PA_{6}	—	August 6, 2004	Palomar	NEAT	·	1.6 km	MPC · JPL
280506	2004 PK_{6}	—	August 6, 2004	Palomar	NEAT	NYS	1.2 km	MPC · JPL
280507	2004 PN_{6}	—	August 6, 2004	Palomar	NEAT	·	1.5 km	MPC · JPL
280508	2004 PU_{11}	—	August 7, 2004	Palomar	NEAT	NYS	1.2 km	MPC · JPL
280509	2004 PN_{14}	—	August 7, 2004	Palomar	NEAT	MAS	980 m	MPC · JPL
280510	2004 PT_{23}	—	August 8, 2004	Socorro	LINEAR	·	1.3 km	MPC · JPL
280511	2004 PV_{23}	—	August 8, 2004	Socorro	LINEAR	MAS	950 m	MPC · JPL
280512	2004 PE_{27}	—	August 8, 2004	Reedy Creek	J. Broughton	·	1.6 km	MPC · JPL
280513	2004 PD_{28}	—	August 5, 2004	Palomar	NEAT	·	910 m	MPC · JPL
280514	2004 PM_{50}	—	August 8, 2004	Socorro	LINEAR	·	1.7 km	MPC · JPL
280515	2004 PQ_{64}	—	August 10, 2004	Socorro	LINEAR	MAS	700 m	MPC · JPL
280516	2004 PW_{69}	—	August 7, 2004	Palomar	NEAT	·	1.0 km	MPC · JPL
280517	2004 PD_{71}	—	August 8, 2004	Palomar	NEAT	·	1.1 km	MPC · JPL
280518	2004 PY_{75}	—	August 9, 2004	Socorro	LINEAR	·	1.6 km	MPC · JPL
280519	2004 PQ_{76}	—	August 9, 2004	Socorro	LINEAR	·	1.0 km	MPC · JPL
280520	2004 PY_{82}	—	August 10, 2004	Socorro	LINEAR	·	1.5 km	MPC · JPL
280521	2004 PY_{83}	—	August 10, 2004	Socorro	LINEAR	·	3.6 km	MPC · JPL
280522	2004 PF_{86}	—	August 11, 2004	Socorro	LINEAR	NYS	1.4 km	MPC · JPL
280523	2004 PM_{92}	—	August 12, 2004	Palomar	NEAT	·	1.5 km	MPC · JPL
280524	2004 PR_{97}	—	August 9, 2004	Socorro	LINEAR	NYS	1.3 km	MPC · JPL
280525	2004 PD_{108}	—	August 7, 2004	Palomar	NEAT	MAS	830 m	MPC · JPL
280526	2004 PE_{109}	—	August 11, 2004	Socorro	LINEAR	·	1.4 km	MPC · JPL
280527	2004 QS_{3}	—	August 21, 2004	Catalina	CSS	T_{j} (2.99) · HIL · 3:2	8.5 km	MPC · JPL
280528	2004 QV_{12}	—	August 21, 2004	Siding Spring	SSS	·	1.7 km	MPC · JPL
280529	2004 QJ_{21}	—	August 23, 2004	Kitt Peak	Spacewatch	·	1.3 km	MPC · JPL
280530	2004 QE_{27}	—	August 18, 2004	Siding Spring	SSS	PHO	1.2 km	MPC · JPL
280531	2004 RN_{12}	—	September 8, 2004	Socorro	LINEAR	·	1.1 km	MPC · JPL
280532	2004 RG_{15}	—	September 6, 2004	Bergisch Gladbach	W. Bickel	·	1.1 km	MPC · JPL
280533	2004 RG_{25}	—	September 6, 2004	Siding Spring	SSS	MAS	930 m	MPC · JPL
280534	2004 RK_{26}	—	September 6, 2004	Palomar	NEAT	MAS	820 m	MPC · JPL
280535	2004 RO_{40}	—	September 7, 2004	Kitt Peak	Spacewatch	NYS	1.1 km	MPC · JPL
280536	2004 RE_{49}	—	September 8, 2004	Socorro	LINEAR	·	3.0 km	MPC · JPL
280537	2004 RL_{50}	—	September 8, 2004	Socorro	LINEAR	·	1.5 km	MPC · JPL
280538	2004 RH_{51}	—	September 8, 2004	Socorro	LINEAR	·	1.9 km	MPC · JPL
280539	2004 RE_{53}	—	September 8, 2004	Socorro	LINEAR	MAS	850 m	MPC · JPL
280540	2004 RM_{58}	—	September 8, 2004	Socorro	LINEAR	NYS	1.4 km	MPC · JPL
280541	2004 RH_{68}	—	September 8, 2004	Socorro	LINEAR	MAS	900 m	MPC · JPL
280542	2004 RL_{86}	—	September 7, 2004	Socorro	LINEAR	MAS	800 m	MPC · JPL
280543	2004 RZ_{94}	—	September 8, 2004	Socorro	LINEAR	·	1.0 km	MPC · JPL
280544	2004 RG_{95}	—	September 8, 2004	Socorro	LINEAR	·	1.7 km	MPC · JPL
280545	2004 RO_{126}	—	September 7, 2004	Kitt Peak	Spacewatch	·	1.1 km	MPC · JPL
280546	2004 RJ_{138}	—	September 8, 2004	Palomar	NEAT	·	1.8 km	MPC · JPL
280547	2004 RJ_{166}	—	September 7, 2004	Socorro	LINEAR	MAS	850 m	MPC · JPL
280548	2004 RC_{187}	—	September 10, 2004	Socorro	LINEAR	H	590 m	MPC · JPL
280549	2004 RJ_{203}	—	September 11, 2004	Kitt Peak	Spacewatch	V	980 m	MPC · JPL
280550	2004 RX_{215}	—	September 11, 2004	Socorro	LINEAR	·	2.7 km	MPC · JPL
280551	2004 RC_{224}	—	September 8, 2004	Socorro	LINEAR	(5)	1.3 km	MPC · JPL
280552	2004 RT_{230}	—	September 9, 2004	Kitt Peak	Spacewatch	HNS	2.6 km	MPC · JPL
280553	2004 RA_{259}	—	September 10, 2004	Kitt Peak	Spacewatch	·	1.4 km	MPC · JPL
280554	2004 RX_{260}	—	September 10, 2004	Kitt Peak	Spacewatch	(5)	1.0 km	MPC · JPL
280555	2004 RJ_{278}	—	September 15, 2004	Socorro	LINEAR	·	1.9 km	MPC · JPL
280556	2004 RH_{293}	—	September 11, 2004	Socorro	LINEAR	·	1.4 km	MPC · JPL
280557	2004 RR_{306}	—	September 12, 2004	Socorro	LINEAR	·	2.8 km	MPC · JPL
280558	2004 RU_{309}	—	September 13, 2004	Kitt Peak	Spacewatch	·	1.5 km	MPC · JPL
280559	2004 RQ_{311}	—	September 14, 2004	Palomar	NEAT	·	1.4 km	MPC · JPL
280560	2004 RF_{317}	—	September 11, 2004	Palomar	NEAT	·	2.5 km	MPC · JPL
280561	2004 RD_{330}	—	September 15, 2004	Kitt Peak	Spacewatch	·	1.6 km	MPC · JPL
280562	2004 RU_{339}	—	September 8, 2004	Socorro	LINEAR	NYS	1.4 km	MPC · JPL
280563	2004 SJ_{14}	—	September 17, 2004	Anderson Mesa	LONEOS	KON	3.8 km	MPC · JPL
280564	2004 TE_{2}	—	October 4, 2004	Kitt Peak	Spacewatch	·	1.3 km	MPC · JPL
280565	2004 TG_{2}	—	October 4, 2004	Kitt Peak	Spacewatch	·	1.1 km	MPC · JPL
280566	2004 TC_{4}	—	October 4, 2004	Kitt Peak	Spacewatch	·	980 m	MPC · JPL
280567	2004 TK_{13}	—	October 8, 2004	Socorro	LINEAR	H	870 m	MPC · JPL
280568	2004 TN_{24}	—	October 4, 2004	Kitt Peak	Spacewatch	NYS	1.1 km	MPC · JPL
280569	2004 TH_{33}	—	October 4, 2004	Kitt Peak	Spacewatch	·	1.4 km	MPC · JPL
280570	2004 TP_{41}	—	October 4, 2004	Kitt Peak	Spacewatch	·	2.3 km	MPC · JPL
280571	2004 TJ_{44}	—	October 4, 2004	Kitt Peak	Spacewatch	·	3.2 km	MPC · JPL
280572	2004 TS_{44}	—	October 4, 2004	Kitt Peak	Spacewatch	·	1.3 km	MPC · JPL
280573	2004 TG_{55}	—	October 4, 2004	Kitt Peak	Spacewatch	fast	1.5 km	MPC · JPL
280574	2004 TN_{92}	—	October 5, 2004	Kitt Peak	Spacewatch	·	1.5 km	MPC · JPL
280575	2004 TX_{131}	—	October 7, 2004	Anderson Mesa	LONEOS	(5)	1.8 km	MPC · JPL
280576	2004 TN_{133}	—	October 7, 2004	Anderson Mesa	LONEOS	·	1.9 km	MPC · JPL
280577	2004 TM_{176}	—	October 9, 2004	Socorro	LINEAR	EUN	1.8 km	MPC · JPL
280578	2004 TD_{195}	—	October 7, 2004	Kitt Peak	Spacewatch	·	1.2 km	MPC · JPL
280579	2004 TY_{196}	—	October 7, 2004	Kitt Peak	Spacewatch	·	1.4 km	MPC · JPL
280580	2004 TK_{203}	—	October 7, 2004	Kitt Peak	Spacewatch	·	1.2 km	MPC · JPL
280581	2004 TB_{216}	—	October 6, 2004	Palomar	NEAT	·	1.6 km	MPC · JPL
280582	2004 TM_{225}	—	October 8, 2004	Kitt Peak	Spacewatch	·	2.3 km	MPC · JPL
280583	2004 TR_{242}	—	October 6, 2004	Socorro	LINEAR	·	3.2 km	MPC · JPL
280584	2004 TT_{303}	—	October 10, 2004	Kitt Peak	Spacewatch	(5)	1.1 km	MPC · JPL
280585	2004 TE_{323}	—	October 11, 2004	Kitt Peak	Spacewatch	·	1.6 km	MPC · JPL
280586	2004 TO_{328}	—	October 4, 2004	Palomar	NEAT	·	1.5 km	MPC · JPL
280587	2004 TO_{345}	—	October 14, 2004	Kitt Peak	Spacewatch	·	1.6 km	MPC · JPL
280588	2004 TB_{346}	—	October 15, 2004	Socorro	LINEAR	EUN	1.4 km	MPC · JPL
280589	2004 TX_{348}	—	October 7, 2004	Kitt Peak	Spacewatch	slow	2.6 km	MPC · JPL
280590	2004 UU	—	October 18, 2004	Goodricke-Pigott	Goodricke-Pigott	H	650 m	MPC · JPL
280591	2004 VD_{10}	—	November 3, 2004	Anderson Mesa	LONEOS	·	3.1 km	MPC · JPL
280592	2004 VV_{12}	—	November 3, 2004	Palomar	NEAT	·	2.1 km	MPC · JPL
280593	2004 VP_{19}	—	November 4, 2004	Anderson Mesa	LONEOS	·	1.6 km	MPC · JPL
280594	2004 VU_{19}	—	November 4, 2004	Anderson Mesa	LONEOS	·	1.7 km	MPC · JPL
280595	2004 VW_{26}	—	November 4, 2004	Catalina	CSS	·	1.6 km	MPC · JPL
280596	2004 VF_{34}	—	November 3, 2004	Kitt Peak	Spacewatch	·	3.2 km	MPC · JPL
280597	2004 VP_{35}	—	November 3, 2004	Anderson Mesa	LONEOS	H	790 m	MPC · JPL
280598	2004 VW_{41}	—	November 4, 2004	Kitt Peak	Spacewatch	·	1.9 km	MPC · JPL
280599	2004 VB_{51}	—	November 4, 2004	Kitt Peak	Spacewatch	·	1.2 km	MPC · JPL
280600	2004 VN_{53}	—	November 7, 2004	Socorro	LINEAR	·	2.2 km	MPC · JPL

== 280601–280700 ==
back to top

Designation			Discovery			Properties		Ref
Permanent	Provisional	Named after	Date	Site	Discoverer(s)	Category	Diam.	Ref
280601	2004 VO_{76}	—	November 12, 2004	Catalina	CSS	·	1.8 km	MPC · JPL
280602	2004 VU_{77}	—	November 12, 2004	Catalina	CSS	·	2.3 km	MPC · JPL
280603	2004 VN_{92}	—	November 4, 2004	Kitt Peak	Spacewatch	·	1.7 km	MPC · JPL
280604	2004 VJ_{95}	—	November 10, 2004	Kitt Peak	Spacewatch	EUN	1.6 km	MPC · JPL
280605	2004 WX_{1}	—	November 17, 2004	Campo Imperatore	CINEOS	GEF	1.7 km	MPC · JPL
280606	2004 WT_{8}	—	November 18, 2004	Campo Imperatore	CINEOS	(1547)	2.4 km	MPC · JPL
280607	2004 WY_{9}	—	November 30, 2004	Palomar	NEAT	(194)	2.0 km	MPC · JPL
280608	2004 XE	—	December 1, 2004	Socorro	LINEAR	H	710 m	MPC · JPL
280609	2004 XR_{5}	—	December 7, 2004	Nakagawa	Nakagawa	·	2.4 km	MPC · JPL
280610	2004 XJ_{8}	—	December 2, 2004	Palomar	NEAT	·	3.1 km	MPC · JPL
280611	2004 XW_{14}	—	December 8, 2004	Socorro	LINEAR	HNS	1.6 km	MPC · JPL
280612	2004 XF_{20}	—	December 8, 2004	Socorro	LINEAR	DOR	2.5 km	MPC · JPL
280613	2004 XQ_{23}	—	December 9, 2004	Kitt Peak	Spacewatch	·	2.9 km	MPC · JPL
280614	2004 XY_{24}	—	December 9, 2004	Kitt Peak	Spacewatch	EUN · fast	1.8 km	MPC · JPL
280615	2004 XB_{50}	—	December 12, 2004	Socorro	LINEAR	H	680 m	MPC · JPL
280616	2004 XC_{56}	—	December 10, 2004	Socorro	LINEAR	·	4.4 km	MPC · JPL
280617	2004 XC_{63}	—	December 15, 2004	Junk Bond	Junk Bond	·	2.2 km	MPC · JPL
280618	2004 XU_{64}	—	December 2, 2004	Palomar	NEAT	·	2.8 km	MPC · JPL
280619	2004 XY_{77}	—	December 10, 2004	Socorro	LINEAR	·	1.6 km	MPC · JPL
280620	2004 XT_{83}	—	December 11, 2004	Kitt Peak	Spacewatch	·	2.6 km	MPC · JPL
280621	2004 XC_{84}	—	December 11, 2004	Kitt Peak	Spacewatch	(5)	2.1 km	MPC · JPL
280622	2004 XM_{86}	—	December 13, 2004	Kitt Peak	Spacewatch	·	2.4 km	MPC · JPL
280623	2004 XZ_{93}	—	December 11, 2004	Kitt Peak	Spacewatch	·	4.0 km	MPC · JPL
280624	2004 XH_{99}	—	December 12, 2004	Kitt Peak	Spacewatch	(5)	1.8 km	MPC · JPL
280625	2004 XT_{103}	—	December 9, 2004	Catalina	CSS	·	2.6 km	MPC · JPL
280626	2004 XO_{104}	—	December 10, 2004	Kitt Peak	Spacewatch	HYG	3.2 km	MPC · JPL
280627	2004 XR_{122}	—	December 10, 2004	Kitt Peak	Spacewatch	EOS	2.7 km	MPC · JPL
280628	2004 XY_{126}	—	December 14, 2004	Kitt Peak	Spacewatch	·	2.2 km	MPC · JPL
280629	2004 XK_{128}	—	December 14, 2004	Socorro	LINEAR	·	2.0 km	MPC · JPL
280630	2004 XJ_{142}	—	December 2, 2004	Kitt Peak	Spacewatch	·	2.8 km	MPC · JPL
280631	2004 XN_{145}	—	December 14, 2004	Campo Imperatore	CINEOS	·	4.5 km	MPC · JPL
280632	2004 XN_{157}	—	December 14, 2004	Socorro	LINEAR	H	780 m	MPC · JPL
280633	2004 XH_{162}	—	December 15, 2004	Socorro	LINEAR	·	2.6 km	MPC · JPL
280634	2004 XE_{177}	—	December 11, 2004	Kitt Peak	Spacewatch	·	3.8 km	MPC · JPL
280635	2004 YO_{1}	—	December 19, 2004	Junk Bond	Junk Bond	(5)	1.9 km	MPC · JPL
280636	2004 YO_{13}	—	December 18, 2004	Mount Lemmon	Mount Lemmon Survey	·	1.6 km	MPC · JPL
280637	2004 YD_{14}	—	December 18, 2004	Mount Lemmon	Mount Lemmon Survey	ADE	2.6 km	MPC · JPL
280638	2004 YB_{33}	—	December 16, 2004	Anderson Mesa	LONEOS	·	3.5 km	MPC · JPL
280639	2005 AH	—	January 4, 2005	Great Shefford	Birtwhistle, P.	·	1.6 km	MPC · JPL
280640 Ruetsch	2005 AV	Ruetsch	January 4, 2005	Vicques	M. Ory	WIT	1.4 km	MPC · JPL
280641 Edosara	2005 AT_{3}	Edosara	January 6, 2005	San Marcello	L. Tesi, Fagioli, G.	·	2.4 km	MPC · JPL
280642 Doubs	2005 AR_{27}	Doubs	January 13, 2005	Vicques	M. Ory	·	2.5 km	MPC · JPL
280643	2005 AY_{37}	—	January 13, 2005	Kitt Peak	Spacewatch	·	5.1 km	MPC · JPL
280644	2005 AN_{65}	—	January 13, 2005	Kitt Peak	Spacewatch	HOF	3.0 km	MPC · JPL
280645	2005 AE_{77}	—	January 15, 2005	Kitt Peak	Spacewatch	·	4.6 km	MPC · JPL
280646	2005 BD_{3}	—	January 16, 2005	Kitt Peak	Spacewatch	PAD	2.8 km	MPC · JPL
280647	2005 BD_{12}	—	January 17, 2005	Kitt Peak	Spacewatch	·	2.3 km	MPC · JPL
280648	2005 BR_{19}	—	January 16, 2005	Kitt Peak	Spacewatch	HOF	3.2 km	MPC · JPL
280649	2005 BJ_{21}	—	January 16, 2005	Kitt Peak	Spacewatch	HOF	3.3 km	MPC · JPL
280650	2005 BM_{27}	—	January 18, 2005	Catalina	CSS	·	3.2 km	MPC · JPL
280651	2005 BE_{33}	—	January 16, 2005	Mauna Kea	Veillet, C.	·	2.4 km	MPC · JPL
280652 Aimaku	2005 CQ	Aimaku	February 2, 2005	San Marcello	L. Tesi, Fagioli, G.	H	750 m	MPC · JPL
280653	2005 CC_{23}	—	February 1, 2005	Catalina	CSS	·	5.6 km	MPC · JPL
280654	2005 CX_{31}	—	February 1, 2005	Kitt Peak	Spacewatch	·	2.3 km	MPC · JPL
280655	2005 CS_{39}	—	February 1, 2005	Kitt Peak	Spacewatch	EOS	2.3 km	MPC · JPL
280656	2005 EB_{3}	—	March 1, 2005	Kitt Peak	Spacewatch	AGN	1.5 km	MPC · JPL
280657	2005 ED_{8}	—	March 1, 2005	Kitt Peak	Spacewatch	THM	2.5 km	MPC · JPL
280658	2005 EU_{18}	—	March 3, 2005	Kitt Peak	Spacewatch	THM	2.7 km	MPC · JPL
280659	2005 EZ_{20}	—	March 3, 2005	Catalina	CSS	·	2.9 km	MPC · JPL
280660	2005 EO_{24}	—	March 3, 2005	Catalina	CSS	ERI	2.7 km	MPC · JPL
280661	2005 ET_{36}	—	March 4, 2005	Socorro	LINEAR	·	2.3 km	MPC · JPL
280662	2005 EY_{43}	—	March 3, 2005	Kitt Peak	Spacewatch	KOR	1.7 km	MPC · JPL
280663	2005 EU_{55}	—	March 4, 2005	Kitt Peak	Spacewatch	EOS	1.8 km	MPC · JPL
280664	2005 ES_{63}	—	March 4, 2005	Mount Lemmon	Mount Lemmon Survey	·	6.2 km	MPC · JPL
280665	2005 EC_{66}	—	March 4, 2005	Catalina	CSS	TIR	4.0 km	MPC · JPL
280666	2005 EG_{91}	—	March 8, 2005	Kitt Peak	Spacewatch	·	5.1 km	MPC · JPL
280667	2005 EA_{137}	—	March 9, 2005	Mount Lemmon	Mount Lemmon Survey	·	4.6 km	MPC · JPL
280668	2005 EV_{149}	—	March 10, 2005	Kitt Peak	Spacewatch	·	3.8 km	MPC · JPL
280669	2005 EL_{150}	—	March 10, 2005	Kitt Peak	Spacewatch	·	3.9 km	MPC · JPL
280670	2005 ES_{153}	—	March 9, 2005	Catalina	CSS	·	3.3 km	MPC · JPL
280671	2005 EC_{157}	—	March 9, 2005	Mount Lemmon	Mount Lemmon Survey	·	2.7 km	MPC · JPL
280672	2005 EK_{159}	—	March 9, 2005	Mount Lemmon	Mount Lemmon Survey	·	4.4 km	MPC · JPL
280673	2005 EL_{162}	—	March 10, 2005	Mount Lemmon	Mount Lemmon Survey	·	2.2 km	MPC · JPL
280674	2005 EB_{172}	—	March 7, 2005	Socorro	LINEAR	·	5.6 km	MPC · JPL
280675	2005 ED_{177}	—	March 8, 2005	Mount Lemmon	Mount Lemmon Survey	·	3.2 km	MPC · JPL
280676	2005 EE_{185}	—	March 9, 2005	Kitt Peak	Spacewatch	·	4.9 km	MPC · JPL
280677	2005 EL_{185}	—	March 9, 2005	Siding Spring	SSS	·	4.4 km	MPC · JPL
280678	2005 EO_{194}	—	March 4, 2005	Kitt Peak	Spacewatch	HYG	2.9 km	MPC · JPL
280679	2005 EG_{200}	—	March 12, 2005	Socorro	LINEAR	·	5.4 km	MPC · JPL
280680	2005 EG_{220}	—	March 11, 2005	Anderson Mesa	LONEOS	EUP	5.9 km	MPC · JPL
280681	2005 ET_{226}	—	March 9, 2005	Socorro	LINEAR	EOS	2.5 km	MPC · JPL
280682	2005 EF_{233}	—	March 10, 2005	Anderson Mesa	LONEOS	·	3.8 km	MPC · JPL
280683	2005 EZ_{234}	—	March 10, 2005	Mount Lemmon	Mount Lemmon Survey	·	2.5 km	MPC · JPL
280684	2005 EA_{243}	—	March 11, 2005	Catalina	CSS	EOS	3.0 km	MPC · JPL
280685	2005 EQ_{246}	—	March 12, 2005	Kitt Peak	Spacewatch	·	2.3 km	MPC · JPL
280686 Jasevičius	2005 EU_{249}	Jasevičius	March 13, 2005	Moletai	Molėtai	·	2.7 km	MPC · JPL
280687	2005 EB_{268}	—	March 14, 2005	Mount Lemmon	Mount Lemmon Survey	·	2.9 km	MPC · JPL
280688	2005 EP_{276}	—	March 8, 2005	Mount Lemmon	Mount Lemmon Survey	VER	6.0 km	MPC · JPL
280689	2005 ET_{282}	—	March 10, 2005	Catalina	CSS	EOS	2.8 km	MPC · JPL
280690	2005 EQ_{317}	—	March 12, 2005	Kitt Peak	M. W. Buie	THM	3.7 km	MPC · JPL
280691	2005 EL_{330}	—	March 4, 2005	Catalina	CSS	TIR	3.4 km	MPC · JPL
280692	2005 EU_{330}	—	March 1, 2005	Catalina	CSS	·	2.7 km	MPC · JPL
280693	2005 EW_{330}	—	March 15, 2005	Catalina	CSS	·	3.3 km	MPC · JPL
280694	2005 FX_{4}	—	March 30, 2005	Catalina	CSS	LIX	5.9 km	MPC · JPL
280695	2005 FX_{14}	—	March 18, 2005	Catalina	CSS	EOS	2.8 km	MPC · JPL
280696	2005 GL_{2}	—	April 1, 2005	Kitt Peak	Spacewatch	·	3.6 km	MPC · JPL
280697	2005 GE_{23}	—	April 1, 2005	Kitt Peak	Spacewatch	·	2.3 km	MPC · JPL
280698	2005 GP_{23}	—	April 1, 2005	Catalina	CSS	·	5.9 km	MPC · JPL
280699	2005 GD_{26}	—	April 2, 2005	Mount Lemmon	Mount Lemmon Survey	·	3.3 km	MPC · JPL
280700	2005 GS_{28}	—	April 4, 2005	Kitt Peak	Spacewatch	·	4.1 km	MPC · JPL

== 280701–280800 ==
back to top

Designation			Discovery			Properties		Ref
Permanent	Provisional	Named after	Date	Site	Discoverer(s)	Category	Diam.	Ref
280701	2005 GC_{37}	—	April 2, 2005	Catalina	CSS	·	4.3 km	MPC · JPL
280702	2005 GQ_{39}	—	April 4, 2005	Catalina	CSS	·	3.7 km	MPC · JPL
280703	2005 GC_{50}	—	April 5, 2005	Mount Lemmon	Mount Lemmon Survey	EOS	2.5 km	MPC · JPL
280704	2005 GN_{54}	—	April 5, 2005	Mount Lemmon	Mount Lemmon Survey	·	2.3 km	MPC · JPL
280705	2005 GJ_{56}	—	April 6, 2005	Mount Lemmon	Mount Lemmon Survey	·	1.7 km	MPC · JPL
280706	2005 GL_{58}	—	April 6, 2005	Mount Lemmon	Mount Lemmon Survey	THM	3.3 km	MPC · JPL
280707	2005 GV_{59}	—	April 6, 2005	Junk Bond	Junk Bond	·	3.6 km	MPC · JPL
280708	2005 GH_{65}	—	April 2, 2005	Palomar	NEAT	·	5.1 km	MPC · JPL
280709	2005 GN_{68}	—	April 2, 2005	Catalina	CSS	TIR	2.6 km	MPC · JPL
280710	2005 GH_{80}	—	April 7, 2005	Kitt Peak	Spacewatch	·	2.8 km	MPC · JPL
280711	2005 GJ_{80}	—	April 7, 2005	Kitt Peak	Spacewatch	·	4.6 km	MPC · JPL
280712	2005 GB_{88}	—	April 5, 2005	Anderson Mesa	LONEOS	TIR	3.7 km	MPC · JPL
280713	2005 GQ_{89}	—	April 5, 2005	Mount Lemmon	Mount Lemmon Survey	ARM	4.7 km	MPC · JPL
280714	2005 GW_{104}	—	April 10, 2005	Kitt Peak	Spacewatch	·	3.2 km	MPC · JPL
280715	2005 GD_{107}	—	April 10, 2005	Mount Lemmon	Mount Lemmon Survey	·	3.6 km	MPC · JPL
280716	2005 GY_{112}	—	April 6, 2005	Catalina	CSS	URS	4.7 km	MPC · JPL
280717	2005 GC_{116}	—	April 11, 2005	Kitt Peak	Spacewatch	·	3.0 km	MPC · JPL
280718	2005 GQ_{124}	—	April 9, 2005	Catalina	CSS	EOS	3.0 km	MPC · JPL
280719	2005 GV_{128}	—	April 10, 2005	Catalina	CSS	T_{j} (2.96)	5.2 km	MPC · JPL
280720	2005 GA_{139}	—	April 12, 2005	Socorro	LINEAR	·	3.6 km	MPC · JPL
280721	2005 GX_{139}	—	April 12, 2005	Mount Lemmon	Mount Lemmon Survey	·	3.8 km	MPC · JPL
280722	2005 GW_{161}	—	April 13, 2005	Siding Spring	SSS	·	5.0 km	MPC · JPL
280723	2005 GD_{172}	—	April 14, 2005	Kitt Peak	Spacewatch	THM	2.9 km	MPC · JPL
280724	2005 GY_{179}	—	April 6, 2005	Siding Spring	SSS	EUP	7.0 km	MPC · JPL
280725	2005 GV_{180}	—	April 12, 2005	Kitt Peak	Spacewatch	(31811)	4.1 km	MPC · JPL
280726	2005 GD_{181}	—	April 12, 2005	Kitt Peak	Spacewatch	·	4.4 km	MPC · JPL
280727	2005 GU_{192}	—	April 10, 2005	Kitt Peak	M. W. Buie	KOR	1.5 km	MPC · JPL
280728	2005 GH_{220}	—	April 4, 2005	Catalina	CSS	LIX	4.6 km	MPC · JPL
280729	2005 HE_{1}	—	April 16, 2005	Kitt Peak	Spacewatch	·	2.7 km	MPC · JPL
280730	2005 HS_{3}	—	April 27, 2005	Cordell-Lorenz	D. T. Durig	·	5.4 km	MPC · JPL
280731	2005 JQ_{4}	—	May 1, 2005	Kitt Peak	Spacewatch	EUN	1.5 km	MPC · JPL
280732	2005 JE_{20}	—	May 4, 2005	Catalina	CSS	·	4.3 km	MPC · JPL
280733	2005 JB_{72}	—	March 17, 2005	Kitt Peak	Spacewatch	HYG	2.8 km	MPC · JPL
280734	2005 JY_{87}	—	May 10, 2005	Kitt Peak	Spacewatch	EOS	2.4 km	MPC · JPL
280735	2005 JB_{92}	—	May 11, 2005	Palomar	NEAT	·	4.0 km	MPC · JPL
280736	2005 JT_{99}	—	May 9, 2005	Kitt Peak	Spacewatch	·	4.3 km	MPC · JPL
280737	2005 JX_{103}	—	May 10, 2005	Mount Lemmon	Mount Lemmon Survey	·	4.0 km	MPC · JPL
280738	2005 JA_{130}	—	May 13, 2005	Kitt Peak	Spacewatch	HYG	3.7 km	MPC · JPL
280739	2005 JK_{142}	—	May 15, 2005	Palomar	NEAT	·	3.9 km	MPC · JPL
280740	2005 KC_{4}	—	May 17, 2005	Mount Lemmon	Mount Lemmon Survey	THB	2.8 km	MPC · JPL
280741	2005 LC_{1}	—	June 1, 2005	Reedy Creek	J. Broughton	·	2.6 km	MPC · JPL
280742	2005 LY_{42}	—	June 8, 2005	Mauna Kea	D. J. Tholen	·	630 m	MPC · JPL
280743	2005 LM_{51}	—	June 14, 2005	Kitt Peak	Spacewatch	HNS	2.0 km	MPC · JPL
280744	2005 MA_{41}	—	June 30, 2005	Kitt Peak	Spacewatch	·	760 m	MPC · JPL
280745	2005 NF_{2}	—	July 2, 2005	Kitt Peak	Spacewatch	·	5.1 km	MPC · JPL
280746	2005 NJ_{42}	—	July 5, 2005	Kitt Peak	Spacewatch	·	830 m	MPC · JPL
280747	2005 NM_{78}	—	July 11, 2005	Kitt Peak	Spacewatch	·	820 m	MPC · JPL
280748	2005 NO_{94}	—	July 6, 2005	Kitt Peak	Spacewatch	SYL · CYB	6.5 km	MPC · JPL
280749	2005 OL_{1}	—	July 26, 2005	Palomar	NEAT	·	3.8 km	MPC · JPL
280750	2005 PD_{14}	—	August 4, 2005	Palomar	NEAT	·	770 m	MPC · JPL
280751	2005 QR_{19}	—	August 25, 2005	Campo Imperatore	CINEOS	·	690 m	MPC · JPL
280752	2005 QP_{21}	—	August 26, 2005	Anderson Mesa	LONEOS	·	2.1 km	MPC · JPL
280753	2005 QR_{25}	—	August 27, 2005	Kitt Peak	Spacewatch	·	980 m	MPC · JPL
280754	2005 QB_{29}	—	August 26, 2005	Palomar	NEAT	·	820 m	MPC · JPL
280755	2005 QN_{70}	—	August 29, 2005	Socorro	LINEAR	·	980 m	MPC · JPL
280756	2005 QU_{72}	—	August 29, 2005	Kitt Peak	Spacewatch	·	1.1 km	MPC · JPL
280757	2005 QP_{80}	—	August 28, 2005	Anderson Mesa	LONEOS	·	910 m	MPC · JPL
280758	2005 QG_{84}	—	August 29, 2005	Anderson Mesa	LONEOS	·	730 m	MPC · JPL
280759	2005 QX_{96}	—	August 27, 2005	Palomar	NEAT	·	1.2 km	MPC · JPL
280760	2005 QB_{165}	—	August 31, 2005	Palomar	NEAT	·	980 m	MPC · JPL
280761	2005 QH_{166}	—	August 28, 2005	Anderson Mesa	LONEOS	·	2.3 km	MPC · JPL
280762	2005 QM_{178}	—	August 27, 2005	Palomar	NEAT	·	880 m	MPC · JPL
280763	2005 RU_{2}	—	September 1, 2005	Kitt Peak	Spacewatch	·	1.3 km	MPC · JPL
280764	2005 RE_{14}	—	September 1, 2005	Kitt Peak	Spacewatch	·	770 m	MPC · JPL
280765	2005 RY_{41}	—	September 14, 2005	Kitt Peak	Spacewatch	V	840 m	MPC · JPL
280766	2005 RQ_{44}	—	September 1, 2005	Palomar	NEAT	·	2.3 km	MPC · JPL
280767	2005 SQ_{7}	—	September 24, 2005	Kitt Peak	Spacewatch	·	1.5 km	MPC · JPL
280768	2005 SE_{13}	—	September 24, 2005	Kitt Peak	Spacewatch	3:2 · SHU	7.2 km	MPC · JPL
280769	2005 SJ_{20}	—	September 23, 2005	Kitt Peak	Spacewatch	V	1.1 km	MPC · JPL
280770	2005 SW_{20}	—	September 25, 2005	Kitt Peak	Spacewatch	(1338) (FLO)	880 m	MPC · JPL
280771	2005 SZ_{20}	—	September 25, 2005	Kitt Peak	Spacewatch	V	800 m	MPC · JPL
280772	2005 SJ_{37}	—	September 24, 2005	Kitt Peak	Spacewatch	·	820 m	MPC · JPL
280773	2005 SF_{50}	—	September 24, 2005	Kitt Peak	Spacewatch	·	1.2 km	MPC · JPL
280774	2005 SM_{63}	—	September 26, 2005	Kitt Peak	Spacewatch	·	1.2 km	MPC · JPL
280775	2005 SR_{68}	—	September 27, 2005	Kitt Peak	Spacewatch	ERI	2.0 km	MPC · JPL
280776	2005 SP_{69}	—	September 27, 2005	Kitt Peak	Spacewatch	·	1.3 km	MPC · JPL
280777	2005 SU_{72}	—	September 23, 2005	Kitt Peak	Spacewatch	·	860 m	MPC · JPL
280778	2005 SB_{112}	—	September 26, 2005	Palomar	NEAT	·	1.9 km	MPC · JPL
280779	2005 SE_{118}	—	September 28, 2005	Palomar	NEAT	·	920 m	MPC · JPL
280780	2005 SC_{124}	—	September 29, 2005	Anderson Mesa	LONEOS	·	750 m	MPC · JPL
280781	2005 SO_{129}	—	September 29, 2005	Anderson Mesa	LONEOS	·	1.8 km	MPC · JPL
280782	2005 SA_{130}	—	September 29, 2005	Anderson Mesa	LONEOS	·	770 m	MPC · JPL
280783	2005 SV_{139}	—	September 25, 2005	Kitt Peak	Spacewatch	·	770 m	MPC · JPL
280784	2005 SG_{149}	—	September 25, 2005	Kitt Peak	Spacewatch	·	1.4 km	MPC · JPL
280785	2005 SB_{158}	—	September 26, 2005	Kitt Peak	Spacewatch	·	800 m	MPC · JPL
280786	2005 SJ_{175}	—	September 29, 2005	Kitt Peak	Spacewatch	HYG	4.9 km	MPC · JPL
280787	2005 ST_{179}	—	September 29, 2005	Anderson Mesa	LONEOS	·	890 m	MPC · JPL
280788	2005 SK_{187}	—	September 29, 2005	Anderson Mesa	LONEOS	·	1.1 km	MPC · JPL
280789	2005 ST_{204}	—	September 30, 2005	Anderson Mesa	LONEOS	·	1.1 km	MPC · JPL
280790	2005 SP_{210}	—	September 30, 2005	Palomar	NEAT	·	900 m	MPC · JPL
280791	2005 SL_{239}	—	September 30, 2005	Kitt Peak	Spacewatch	·	1.1 km	MPC · JPL
280792	2005 SM_{263}	—	September 23, 2005	Anderson Mesa	LONEOS	V	760 m	MPC · JPL
280793	2005 SC_{266}	—	September 29, 2005	Anderson Mesa	LONEOS	·	1.2 km	MPC · JPL
280794	2005 TV_{3}	—	October 1, 2005	Anderson Mesa	LONEOS	·	1.2 km	MPC · JPL
280795	2005 TY_{17}	—	October 1, 2005	Socorro	LINEAR	·	820 m	MPC · JPL
280796	2005 TV_{24}	—	October 1, 2005	Mount Lemmon	Mount Lemmon Survey	·	720 m	MPC · JPL
280797	2005 TP_{26}	—	October 1, 2005	Mount Lemmon	Mount Lemmon Survey	MAS	820 m	MPC · JPL
280798	2005 TU_{27}	—	October 1, 2005	Catalina	CSS	·	1.5 km	MPC · JPL
280799	2005 TB_{56}	—	October 6, 2005	Kitt Peak	Spacewatch	·	790 m	MPC · JPL
280800	2005 TZ_{71}	—	October 3, 2005	Catalina	CSS	·	1.4 km	MPC · JPL

== 280801–280900 ==
back to top

Designation			Discovery			Properties		Ref
Permanent	Provisional	Named after	Date	Site	Discoverer(s)	Category	Diam.	Ref
280801	2005 TK_{72}	—	October 5, 2005	Socorro	LINEAR	·	780 m	MPC · JPL
280802	2005 TN_{104}	—	October 8, 2005	Socorro	LINEAR	·	850 m	MPC · JPL
280803	2005 TC_{107}	—	October 4, 2005	Mount Lemmon	Mount Lemmon Survey	V	940 m	MPC · JPL
280804	2005 TR_{132}	—	October 7, 2005	Kitt Peak	Spacewatch	·	1.8 km	MPC · JPL
280805	2005 TP_{143}	—	October 8, 2005	Kitt Peak	Spacewatch	·	1.4 km	MPC · JPL
280806	2005 TK_{147}	—	April 12, 2004	Kitt Peak	Spacewatch	V	780 m	MPC · JPL
280807	2005 TN_{164}	—	October 9, 2005	Kitt Peak	Spacewatch	·	730 m	MPC · JPL
280808	2005 TC_{168}	—	October 9, 2005	Kitt Peak	Spacewatch	MAS	850 m	MPC · JPL
280809	2005 TE_{172}	—	October 10, 2005	Kitt Peak	Spacewatch	V	910 m	MPC · JPL
280810	2005 TT_{177}	—	September 15, 2005	Catalina	CSS	·	820 m	MPC · JPL
280811	2005 TC_{186}	—	October 7, 2005	Kitt Peak	Spacewatch	NYS	1.0 km	MPC · JPL
280812	2005 TL_{191}	—	October 1, 2005	Catalina	CSS	HYG	3.1 km	MPC · JPL
280813	2005 UQ_{7}	—	October 26, 2005	Ottmarsheim	C. Rinner	·	1.1 km	MPC · JPL
280814	2005 UZ_{8}	—	October 20, 2005	Palomar	NEAT	·	960 m	MPC · JPL
280815	2005 US_{17}	—	October 22, 2005	Kitt Peak	Spacewatch	·	2.1 km	MPC · JPL
280816	2005 UY_{19}	—	October 22, 2005	Kitt Peak	Spacewatch	·	1.1 km	MPC · JPL
280817	2005 UZ_{23}	—	October 23, 2005	Kitt Peak	Spacewatch	·	1.4 km	MPC · JPL
280818	2005 UM_{37}	—	October 24, 2005	Kitt Peak	Spacewatch	(2076)	990 m	MPC · JPL
280819	2005 UD_{40}	—	October 24, 2005	Kitt Peak	Spacewatch	·	780 m	MPC · JPL
280820	2005 UE_{49}	—	October 23, 2005	Catalina	CSS	·	1.7 km	MPC · JPL
280821	2005 UM_{53}	—	October 23, 2005	Catalina	CSS	·	1.1 km	MPC · JPL
280822	2005 UP_{53}	—	October 23, 2005	Catalina	CSS	·	1.0 km	MPC · JPL
280823	2005 UG_{55}	—	October 23, 2005	Catalina	CSS	·	1.9 km	MPC · JPL
280824	2005 UB_{56}	—	October 23, 2005	Catalina	CSS	·	2.1 km	MPC · JPL
280825	2005 UF_{63}	—	October 25, 2005	Mount Lemmon	Mount Lemmon Survey	·	1.4 km	MPC · JPL
280826	2005 UH_{66}	—	October 22, 2005	Kitt Peak	Spacewatch	V	800 m	MPC · JPL
280827	2005 UT_{68}	—	October 23, 2005	Palomar	NEAT	·	1.5 km	MPC · JPL
280828	2005 UF_{74}	—	October 23, 2005	Catalina	CSS	V	990 m	MPC · JPL
280829	2005 UG_{97}	—	October 22, 2005	Kitt Peak	Spacewatch	·	1.7 km	MPC · JPL
280830	2005 US_{106}	—	October 22, 2005	Kitt Peak	Spacewatch	·	1.6 km	MPC · JPL
280831	2005 UY_{106}	—	October 22, 2005	Kitt Peak	Spacewatch	V	980 m	MPC · JPL
280832	2005 UP_{109}	—	October 22, 2005	Kitt Peak	Spacewatch	·	850 m	MPC · JPL
280833	2005 UG_{116}	—	October 23, 2005	Catalina	CSS	·	900 m	MPC · JPL
280834	2005 UE_{119}	—	October 24, 2005	Kitt Peak	Spacewatch	·	1.0 km	MPC · JPL
280835	2005 UM_{132}	—	October 24, 2005	Palomar	NEAT	·	1.9 km	MPC · JPL
280836	2005 UD_{144}	—	October 26, 2005	Kitt Peak	Spacewatch	·	1.3 km	MPC · JPL
280837	2005 UU_{150}	—	October 26, 2005	Kitt Peak	Spacewatch	·	1.3 km	MPC · JPL
280838	2005 UX_{153}	—	October 26, 2005	Kitt Peak	Spacewatch	·	640 m	MPC · JPL
280839	2005 UL_{160}	—	October 22, 2005	Catalina	CSS	·	970 m	MPC · JPL
280840	2005 UF_{161}	—	October 22, 2005	Palomar	NEAT	·	850 m	MPC · JPL
280841	2005 UX_{163}	—	October 24, 2005	Kitt Peak	Spacewatch	·	1.1 km	MPC · JPL
280842	2005 UH_{167}	—	October 24, 2005	Kitt Peak	Spacewatch	·	1.6 km	MPC · JPL
280843	2005 UT_{168}	—	October 24, 2005	Kitt Peak	Spacewatch	·	1.2 km	MPC · JPL
280844	2005 UO_{189}	—	October 27, 2005	Mount Lemmon	Mount Lemmon Survey	·	1.0 km	MPC · JPL
280845	2005 UD_{197}	—	October 24, 2005	Kitt Peak	Spacewatch	·	980 m	MPC · JPL
280846	2005 US_{213}	—	October 22, 2005	Catalina	CSS	·	1.1 km	MPC · JPL
280847	2005 UM_{216}	—	October 25, 2005	Kitt Peak	Spacewatch	·	1.1 km	MPC · JPL
280848	2005 UR_{223}	—	October 25, 2005	Kitt Peak	Spacewatch	·	1.3 km	MPC · JPL
280849	2005 UW_{252}	—	October 26, 2005	Kitt Peak	Spacewatch	·	840 m	MPC · JPL
280850	2005 UU_{267}	—	October 27, 2005	Kitt Peak	Spacewatch	·	1.5 km	MPC · JPL
280851	2005 UO_{270}	—	October 28, 2005	Mount Lemmon	Mount Lemmon Survey	MAS	760 m	MPC · JPL
280852	2005 UB_{271}	—	October 28, 2005	Mount Lemmon	Mount Lemmon Survey	MAS	960 m	MPC · JPL
280853	2005 UY_{282}	—	October 26, 2005	Kitt Peak	Spacewatch	·	910 m	MPC · JPL
280854	2005 UL_{283}	—	October 26, 2005	Kitt Peak	Spacewatch	NYS	1.2 km	MPC · JPL
280855	2005 UH_{298}	—	October 26, 2005	Kitt Peak	Spacewatch	·	980 m	MPC · JPL
280856	2005 UU_{298}	—	October 26, 2005	Kitt Peak	Spacewatch	MAS	880 m	MPC · JPL
280857	2005 UW_{300}	—	October 26, 2005	Kitt Peak	Spacewatch	EOS	2.3 km	MPC · JPL
280858	2005 UN_{314}	—	October 28, 2005	Catalina	CSS	·	800 m	MPC · JPL
280859	2005 UU_{330}	—	October 28, 2005	Mount Lemmon	Mount Lemmon Survey	MAS	810 m	MPC · JPL
280860	2005 UH_{347}	—	October 30, 2005	Kitt Peak	Spacewatch	MAS	810 m	MPC · JPL
280861	2005 UP_{363}	—	October 27, 2005	Kitt Peak	Spacewatch	·	950 m	MPC · JPL
280862	2005 UE_{372}	—	October 27, 2005	Kitt Peak	Spacewatch	V	900 m	MPC · JPL
280863	2005 UZ_{392}	—	October 30, 2005	Mount Lemmon	Mount Lemmon Survey	·	800 m	MPC · JPL
280864	2005 UT_{425}	—	October 28, 2005	Kitt Peak	Spacewatch	·	1.0 km	MPC · JPL
280865	2005 UT_{458}	—	October 30, 2005	Palomar	NEAT	·	920 m	MPC · JPL
280866	2005 UH_{461}	—	October 28, 2005	Mount Lemmon	Mount Lemmon Survey	·	1.6 km	MPC · JPL
280867	2005 UQ_{484}	—	October 22, 2005	Palomar	NEAT	·	890 m	MPC · JPL
280868	2005 UA_{494}	—	October 25, 2005	Catalina	CSS	·	2.2 km	MPC · JPL
280869	2005 UP_{511}	—	October 27, 2005	Catalina	CSS	·	1.0 km	MPC · JPL
280870	2005 UA_{512}	—	October 28, 2005	Mount Lemmon	Mount Lemmon Survey	·	1.6 km	MPC · JPL
280871	2005 VY_{12}	—	November 3, 2005	Mount Lemmon	Mount Lemmon Survey	·	2.6 km	MPC · JPL
280872	2005 VW_{14}	—	November 3, 2005	Mount Lemmon	Mount Lemmon Survey	·	870 m	MPC · JPL
280873	2005 VQ_{28}	—	November 4, 2005	Catalina	CSS	V	860 m	MPC · JPL
280874	2005 VG_{71}	—	November 1, 2005	Mount Lemmon	Mount Lemmon Survey	·	1.7 km	MPC · JPL
280875	2005 VA_{76}	—	November 3, 2005	Catalina	CSS	·	790 m	MPC · JPL
280876	2005 VK_{81}	—	November 5, 2005	Kitt Peak	Spacewatch	·	1.3 km	MPC · JPL
280877	2005 VD_{82}	—	November 6, 2005	Kitt Peak	Spacewatch	·	980 m	MPC · JPL
280878	2005 VW_{92}	—	November 6, 2005	Mount Lemmon	Mount Lemmon Survey	·	1.0 km	MPC · JPL
280879	2005 WB_{4}	—	November 23, 2005	Ottmarsheim	C. Rinner	·	2.4 km	MPC · JPL
280880	2005 WG_{6}	—	November 21, 2005	Catalina	CSS	·	740 m	MPC · JPL
280881	2005 WJ_{16}	—	November 22, 2005	Kitt Peak	Spacewatch	·	800 m	MPC · JPL
280882	2005 WM_{17}	—	November 22, 2005	Kitt Peak	Spacewatch	·	3.0 km	MPC · JPL
280883	2005 WJ_{26}	—	November 21, 2005	Kitt Peak	Spacewatch	·	790 m	MPC · JPL
280884	2005 WX_{44}	—	November 22, 2005	Kitt Peak	Spacewatch	MAS	810 m	MPC · JPL
280885	2005 WG_{89}	—	November 25, 2005	Mount Lemmon	Mount Lemmon Survey	·	1.7 km	MPC · JPL
280886	2005 WW_{92}	—	November 25, 2005	Mount Lemmon	Mount Lemmon Survey	EOS	3.1 km	MPC · JPL
280887	2005 WG_{100}	—	November 28, 2005	Catalina	CSS	·	1.1 km	MPC · JPL
280888	2005 WV_{106}	—	November 25, 2005	Kitt Peak	Spacewatch	·	1.1 km	MPC · JPL
280889	2005 WF_{112}	—	November 30, 2005	Mount Lemmon	Mount Lemmon Survey	·	1.3 km	MPC · JPL
280890	2005 WT_{130}	—	November 25, 2005	Mount Lemmon	Mount Lemmon Survey	·	2.7 km	MPC · JPL
280891	2005 WF_{137}	—	November 26, 2005	Mount Lemmon	Mount Lemmon Survey	·	1.1 km	MPC · JPL
280892	2005 WK_{161}	—	November 28, 2005	Mount Lemmon	Mount Lemmon Survey	·	1.2 km	MPC · JPL
280893	2005 WZ_{170}	—	November 30, 2005	Kitt Peak	Spacewatch	fast	1.6 km	MPC · JPL
280894	2005 WB_{174}	—	November 30, 2005	Mount Lemmon	Mount Lemmon Survey	MAS	960 m	MPC · JPL
280895	2005 WU_{181}	—	November 25, 2005	Catalina	CSS	(2076)	1.0 km	MPC · JPL
280896	2005 WL_{187}	—	November 29, 2005	Kitt Peak	Spacewatch	·	1.9 km	MPC · JPL
280897	2005 WV_{189}	—	November 21, 2005	Catalina	CSS	·	2.3 km	MPC · JPL
280898	2005 XG_{1}	—	December 2, 2005	Socorro	LINEAR	·	1.1 km	MPC · JPL
280899	2005 XQ_{3}	—	December 1, 2005	Palomar	NEAT	·	930 m	MPC · JPL
280900	2005 XV_{31}	—	December 2, 2005	Mount Lemmon	Mount Lemmon Survey	PHO	1.2 km	MPC · JPL

== 280901–281000 ==
back to top

Designation			Discovery			Properties		Ref
Permanent	Provisional	Named after	Date	Site	Discoverer(s)	Category	Diam.	Ref
280901	2005 XX_{57}	—	December 1, 2005	Kitt Peak	Spacewatch	·	2.9 km	MPC · JPL
280902	2005 XK_{62}	—	December 5, 2005	Mount Lemmon	Mount Lemmon Survey	·	1.6 km	MPC · JPL
280903	2005 XR_{81}	—	December 7, 2005	Kitt Peak	Spacewatch	·	1.6 km	MPC · JPL
280904	2005 XD_{113}	—	December 7, 2005	Catalina	CSS	·	3.9 km	MPC · JPL
280905	2005 XR_{114}	—	December 2, 2005	Mount Lemmon	Mount Lemmon Survey	·	1.3 km	MPC · JPL
280906	2005 YE_{18}	—	December 23, 2005	Kitt Peak	Spacewatch	ERI	2.0 km	MPC · JPL
280907	2005 YX_{21}	—	December 24, 2005	Kitt Peak	Spacewatch	·	2.5 km	MPC · JPL
280908	2005 YM_{36}	—	December 25, 2005	Kitt Peak	Spacewatch	NYS	1.3 km	MPC · JPL
280909	2005 YM_{41}	—	December 21, 2005	Catalina	CSS	·	3.4 km	MPC · JPL
280910	2005 YB_{60}	—	December 22, 2005	Kitt Peak	Spacewatch	V	760 m	MPC · JPL
280911	2005 YJ_{60}	—	December 22, 2005	Kitt Peak	Spacewatch	MAS	1.0 km	MPC · JPL
280912	2005 YS_{64}	—	December 25, 2005	Kitt Peak	Spacewatch	PHO	1.1 km	MPC · JPL
280913	2005 YS_{84}	—	December 25, 2005	Kitt Peak	Spacewatch	·	1.6 km	MPC · JPL
280914	2005 YA_{85}	—	December 25, 2005	Mount Lemmon	Mount Lemmon Survey	·	940 m	MPC · JPL
280915	2005 YK_{92}	—	December 27, 2005	Mount Lemmon	Mount Lemmon Survey	·	1.1 km	MPC · JPL
280916	2005 YS_{170}	—	December 29, 2005	Socorro	LINEAR	·	3.6 km	MPC · JPL
280917	2005 YM_{174}	—	December 29, 2005	Palomar	NEAT	·	1.6 km	MPC · JPL
280918	2005 YJ_{179}	—	December 26, 2005	Mount Lemmon	Mount Lemmon Survey	·	1.8 km	MPC · JPL
280919	2005 YD_{211}	—	December 25, 2005	Catalina	CSS	·	1.8 km	MPC · JPL
280920	2005 YT_{245}	—	December 30, 2005	Kitt Peak	Spacewatch	(5)	1.3 km	MPC · JPL
280921	2006 AZ_{7}	—	January 7, 2006	Anderson Mesa	LONEOS	·	3.2 km	MPC · JPL
280922	2006 AX_{13}	—	January 5, 2006	Mount Lemmon	Mount Lemmon Survey	·	1.3 km	MPC · JPL
280923	2006 AT_{16}	—	January 5, 2006	Socorro	LINEAR	V	960 m	MPC · JPL
280924 Eurypterus	2006 AP_{22}	Eurypterus	January 5, 2006	Catalina	CSS	BRU	4.1 km	MPC · JPL
280925	2006 AA_{47}	—	January 6, 2006	Kitt Peak	Spacewatch	·	820 m	MPC · JPL
280926	2006 AZ_{49}	—	January 5, 2006	Kitt Peak	Spacewatch	·	1.3 km	MPC · JPL
280927	2006 AK_{59}	—	January 4, 2006	Mount Lemmon	Mount Lemmon Survey	·	1.2 km	MPC · JPL
280928	2006 AB_{61}	—	January 5, 2006	Kitt Peak	Spacewatch	·	1.6 km	MPC · JPL
280929	2006 AS_{67}	—	January 9, 2006	Mount Lemmon	Mount Lemmon Survey	·	3.0 km	MPC · JPL
280930	2006 AH_{84}	—	January 6, 2006	Catalina	CSS	JUN	1.1 km	MPC · JPL
280931	2006 AF_{96}	—	January 5, 2006	Catalina	CSS	·	2.6 km	MPC · JPL
280932	2006 BJ_{27}	—	January 20, 2006	Kitt Peak	Spacewatch	EUP	5.0 km	MPC · JPL
280933	2006 BT_{28}	—	January 22, 2006	Mount Lemmon	Mount Lemmon Survey	MAS	920 m	MPC · JPL
280934	2006 BU_{45}	—	January 23, 2006	Mount Lemmon	Mount Lemmon Survey	·	1.7 km	MPC · JPL
280935	2006 BC_{50}	—	January 25, 2006	Kitt Peak	Spacewatch	·	1.4 km	MPC · JPL
280936	2006 BB_{59}	—	January 23, 2006	Kitt Peak	Spacewatch	·	1.6 km	MPC · JPL
280937	2006 BY_{62}	—	January 20, 2006	Kitt Peak	Spacewatch	KOR	1.6 km	MPC · JPL
280938	2006 BG_{73}	—	January 23, 2006	Kitt Peak	Spacewatch	·	2.0 km	MPC · JPL
280939	2006 BB_{89}	—	January 25, 2006	Kitt Peak	Spacewatch	·	1.7 km	MPC · JPL
280940	2006 BX_{93}	—	January 26, 2006	Kitt Peak	Spacewatch	·	1.7 km	MPC · JPL
280941	2006 BM_{96}	—	January 26, 2006	Kitt Peak	Spacewatch	·	1.9 km	MPC · JPL
280942	2006 BO_{96}	—	January 26, 2006	Kitt Peak	Spacewatch	·	2.2 km	MPC · JPL
280943	2006 BC_{109}	—	January 25, 2006	Kitt Peak	Spacewatch	·	1.2 km	MPC · JPL
280944	2006 BC_{120}	—	January 26, 2006	Kitt Peak	Spacewatch	·	2.5 km	MPC · JPL
280945	2006 BK_{141}	—	January 25, 2006	Kitt Peak	Spacewatch	NYS	1.1 km	MPC · JPL
280946	2006 BZ_{142}	—	January 26, 2006	Kitt Peak	Spacewatch	·	1.5 km	MPC · JPL
280947	2006 BZ_{144}	—	January 23, 2006	Socorro	LINEAR	(5)	1.8 km	MPC · JPL
280948	2006 BH_{148}	—	January 26, 2006	Catalina	CSS	·	2.2 km	MPC · JPL
280949	2006 BP_{154}	—	January 25, 2006	Kitt Peak	Spacewatch	(5)	2.1 km	MPC · JPL
280950	2006 BB_{156}	—	January 25, 2006	Kitt Peak	Spacewatch	·	1.5 km	MPC · JPL
280951	2006 BM_{156}	—	January 25, 2006	Kitt Peak	Spacewatch	EOS	2.2 km	MPC · JPL
280952	2006 BS_{181}	—	January 27, 2006	Mount Lemmon	Mount Lemmon Survey	·	1.1 km	MPC · JPL
280953	2006 BM_{189}	—	January 28, 2006	Kitt Peak	Spacewatch	·	2.1 km	MPC · JPL
280954	2006 BK_{200}	—	January 31, 2006	Mount Lemmon	Mount Lemmon Survey	·	1.7 km	MPC · JPL
280955	2006 BY_{217}	—	January 26, 2006	Catalina	CSS	·	1.0 km	MPC · JPL
280956	2006 BF_{224}	—	January 30, 2006	Kitt Peak	Spacewatch	(5)	1.7 km	MPC · JPL
280957	2006 BE_{233}	—	January 23, 2006	Kitt Peak	Spacewatch	·	2.6 km	MPC · JPL
280958	2006 BF_{233}	—	January 31, 2006	Kitt Peak	Spacewatch	·	1.3 km	MPC · JPL
280959	2006 BR_{241}	—	January 31, 2006	Kitt Peak	Spacewatch	·	1.7 km	MPC · JPL
280960	2006 BJ_{250}	—	January 31, 2006	Kitt Peak	Spacewatch	·	1.6 km	MPC · JPL
280961	2006 BM_{267}	—	January 26, 2006	Catalina	CSS	·	2.0 km	MPC · JPL
280962	2006 BC_{268}	—	January 26, 2006	Catalina	CSS	·	3.0 km	MPC · JPL
280963	2006 CJ_{23}	—	February 2, 2006	Kitt Peak	Spacewatch	·	1.8 km	MPC · JPL
280964	2006 CV_{36}	—	February 2, 2006	Mount Lemmon	Mount Lemmon Survey	·	1.5 km	MPC · JPL
280965	2006 CV_{49}	—	February 3, 2006	Socorro	LINEAR	·	3.2 km	MPC · JPL
280966	2006 CP_{60}	—	February 2, 2006	Catalina	CSS	·	3.2 km	MPC · JPL
280967	2006 DF	—	February 20, 2006	Mayhill	Lowe, A.	·	3.1 km	MPC · JPL
280968	2006 DJ_{1}	—	February 20, 2006	Mayhill	Mayhill	·	1.7 km	MPC · JPL
280969	2006 DZ_{4}	—	February 20, 2006	Kitt Peak	Spacewatch	·	1.5 km	MPC · JPL
280970	2006 DN_{7}	—	February 20, 2006	Catalina	CSS	(5)	2.4 km	MPC · JPL
280971	2006 DH_{11}	—	February 21, 2006	Catalina	CSS	·	2.1 km	MPC · JPL
280972	2006 DH_{15}	—	February 20, 2006	Kitt Peak	Spacewatch	TEL	1.8 km	MPC · JPL
280973	2006 DF_{25}	—	February 20, 2006	Kitt Peak	Spacewatch	·	4.9 km	MPC · JPL
280974	2006 DE_{31}	—	February 20, 2006	Catalina	CSS	·	2.3 km	MPC · JPL
280975	2006 DP_{40}	—	February 22, 2006	Catalina	CSS	·	2.0 km	MPC · JPL
280976	2006 DQ_{46}	—	February 20, 2006	Catalina	CSS	·	5.3 km	MPC · JPL
280977	2006 DU_{49}	—	February 22, 2006	Anderson Mesa	LONEOS	·	2.5 km	MPC · JPL
280978	2006 DG_{53}	—	February 24, 2006	Kitt Peak	Spacewatch	·	4.3 km	MPC · JPL
280979	2006 DJ_{54}	—	February 24, 2006	Kitt Peak	Spacewatch	(12739)	1.4 km	MPC · JPL
280980	2006 DB_{57}	—	February 24, 2006	Palomar	NEAT	H	670 m	MPC · JPL
280981	2006 DW_{65}	—	February 21, 2006	Catalina	CSS	MIS	3.4 km	MPC · JPL
280982	2006 DO_{68}	—	February 26, 2006	Anderson Mesa	LONEOS	·	3.0 km	MPC · JPL
280983	2006 DW_{71}	—	February 21, 2006	Mount Lemmon	Mount Lemmon Survey	·	1.7 km	MPC · JPL
280984	2006 DQ_{84}	—	February 24, 2006	Kitt Peak	Spacewatch	·	2.5 km	MPC · JPL
280985	2006 DK_{87}	—	February 24, 2006	Kitt Peak	Spacewatch	·	2.0 km	MPC · JPL
280986	2006 DD_{88}	—	February 24, 2006	Kitt Peak	Spacewatch	·	1.5 km	MPC · JPL
280987	2006 DQ_{88}	—	February 24, 2006	Kitt Peak	Spacewatch	L5	10 km	MPC · JPL
280988	2006 DW_{90}	—	February 24, 2006	Kitt Peak	Spacewatch	WIT	1.1 km	MPC · JPL
280989	2006 DQ_{91}	—	February 24, 2006	Kitt Peak	Spacewatch	AGN	1.3 km	MPC · JPL
280990	2006 DZ_{93}	—	February 24, 2006	Kitt Peak	Spacewatch	·	2.5 km	MPC · JPL
280991	2006 DJ_{103}	—	February 25, 2006	Mount Lemmon	Mount Lemmon Survey	·	1.6 km	MPC · JPL
280992	2006 DS_{106}	—	February 25, 2006	Kitt Peak	Spacewatch	MRX	1.3 km	MPC · JPL
280993	2006 DE_{108}	—	February 25, 2006	Kitt Peak	Spacewatch	·	2.4 km	MPC · JPL
280994	2006 DF_{113}	—	February 27, 2006	Kitt Peak	Spacewatch	(5)	1.5 km	MPC · JPL
280995	2006 DM_{117}	—	February 27, 2006	Kitt Peak	Spacewatch	·	3.6 km	MPC · JPL
280996	2006 DE_{118}	—	February 27, 2006	Kitt Peak	Spacewatch	·	2.5 km	MPC · JPL
280997	2006 DS_{122}	—	February 24, 2006	Anderson Mesa	LONEOS	AEG	7.3 km	MPC · JPL
280998	2006 DB_{126}	—	February 25, 2006	Kitt Peak	Spacewatch	·	1.7 km	MPC · JPL
280999	2006 DK_{131}	—	February 25, 2006	Kitt Peak	Spacewatch	·	1.8 km	MPC · JPL
281000	2006 DQ_{133}	—	February 25, 2006	Kitt Peak	Spacewatch	·	1.8 km	MPC · JPL

back to top

== See also ==
- Meanings of minor-planet names: 280001–281000
