= List of minor planets: 776001–777000 =

The following is a partial list of minor planets, running from minor-planet number 776001 through 777000, inclusive. The primary data for this and other partial lists is based on JPL's "Small-Body Orbital Elements" and data available from the Minor Planet Center. Critical list information is also provided by the MPC, unless otherwise specified from Lowell Observatory. A detailed description of the table's columns and additional sources are given on the main page including a complete list of every page in this series, and a statistical break-up on the dynamical classification of minor planets.

Also see the summary list of all named bodies in numerical and alphabetical order, and the corresponding naming citations for the number range of this particular list. New namings may only be added to this list after official publication, as the preannouncement of names is condemned by the Working Group for Small Bodies Nomenclature of the International Astronomical Union.

Near-Earth obj.	MBA (inner)	MBA (outer)	Centaur
Mars-crosser	MBA (middle)	Jupiter trojan	Trans-Neptunian obj.
Unclassified

== 776001–776100 ==
Designation			Discovery			Properties		Ref
Permanent	Provisional	Named after	Date	Site	Discoverer(s)	Category	Diam.	Ref
776001	2007 RB_{355}	—	September 13, 2007	Mount Lemmon	Mount Lemmon Survey	·	1.5 km	MPC · JPL
776002	2007 RR_{355}	—	September 12, 2007	Mount Lemmon	Mount Lemmon Survey	L4	6.6 km	MPC · JPL
776003	2007 RY_{356}	—	September 11, 2007	Mount Lemmon	Mount Lemmon Survey	·	1.5 km	MPC · JPL
776004	2007 RM_{357}	—	September 15, 2007	Mount Lemmon	Mount Lemmon Survey	·	1.3 km	MPC · JPL
776005	2007 RG_{359}	—	September 9, 2007	Mount Lemmon	Mount Lemmon Survey	·	2.3 km	MPC · JPL
776006	2007 RO_{359}	—	September 4, 2007	Mount Lemmon	Mount Lemmon Survey	·	1.7 km	MPC · JPL
776007	2007 RA_{362}	—	September 12, 2007	Mount Lemmon	Mount Lemmon Survey	AGN	870 m	MPC · JPL
776008	2007 RB_{365}	—	September 13, 2007	Mount Lemmon	Mount Lemmon Survey	·	760 m	MPC · JPL
776009	2007 RA_{366}	—	September 12, 2007	Mount Lemmon	Mount Lemmon Survey	WIT	700 m	MPC · JPL
776010	2007 RD_{366}	—	September 13, 2007	Mount Lemmon	Mount Lemmon Survey	·	860 m	MPC · JPL
776011	2007 RN_{366}	—	September 11, 2007	Mount Lemmon	Mount Lemmon Survey	·	1.7 km	MPC · JPL
776012	2007 RR_{366}	—	September 12, 2007	Mount Lemmon	Mount Lemmon Survey	·	910 m	MPC · JPL
776013	2007 RB_{367}	—	September 13, 2007	Mount Lemmon	Mount Lemmon Survey	KON	1.4 km	MPC · JPL
776014	2007 RF_{367}	—	September 13, 2007	Mount Lemmon	Mount Lemmon Survey	ADE	1.3 km	MPC · JPL
776015	2007 RL_{367}	—	September 13, 2007	Mount Lemmon	Mount Lemmon Survey	·	860 m	MPC · JPL
776016	2007 RX_{368}	—	September 3, 2007	Mount Lemmon	Mount Lemmon Survey	MAR	870 m	MPC · JPL
776017	2007 RB_{369}	—	September 13, 2007	Mount Lemmon	Mount Lemmon Survey	·	1.2 km	MPC · JPL
776018	2007 RV_{369}	—	September 10, 2007	Mount Lemmon	Mount Lemmon Survey	T_{j} (2.99) · 3:2	3.4 km	MPC · JPL
776019	2007 RF_{370}	—	September 13, 2007	Mount Lemmon	Mount Lemmon Survey	·	1.2 km	MPC · JPL
776020	2007 RC_{371}	—	September 10, 2007	Kitt Peak	Spacewatch	·	2.0 km	MPC · JPL
776021	2007 RN_{371}	—	September 13, 2007	Mount Lemmon	Mount Lemmon Survey	·	2.0 km	MPC · JPL
776022	2007 RP_{371}	—	September 14, 2007	Mount Lemmon	Mount Lemmon Survey	·	1.6 km	MPC · JPL
776023	2007 RU_{372}	—	September 11, 2007	Mount Lemmon	Mount Lemmon Survey	·	1.4 km	MPC · JPL
776024	2007 RY_{372}	—	September 14, 2007	Mount Lemmon	Mount Lemmon Survey	·	850 m	MPC · JPL
776025	2007 RM_{373}	—	September 9, 2007	Kitt Peak	Spacewatch	·	1.5 km	MPC · JPL
776026	2007 RX_{373}	—	September 13, 2007	Mount Lemmon	Mount Lemmon Survey	HOF	1.9 km	MPC · JPL
776027	2007 RX_{374}	—	September 11, 2007	Mount Lemmon	Mount Lemmon Survey	THM	1.6 km	MPC · JPL
776028	2007 RY_{375}	—	September 14, 2007	Mount Lemmon	Mount Lemmon Survey	·	910 m	MPC · JPL
776029	2007 RA_{377}	—	September 14, 2007	Kitt Peak	Spacewatch	VER	1.9 km	MPC · JPL
776030	2007 RL_{377}	—	September 13, 2007	Mount Lemmon	Mount Lemmon Survey	·	970 m	MPC · JPL
776031	2007 RE_{378}	—	September 5, 2007	Mount Lemmon	Mount Lemmon Survey	·	810 m	MPC · JPL
776032	2007 RP_{378}	—	September 10, 2007	Mount Lemmon	Mount Lemmon Survey	·	1.4 km	MPC · JPL
776033	2007 RX_{378}	—	September 15, 2007	Mount Lemmon	Mount Lemmon Survey	·	2.4 km	MPC · JPL
776034	2007 RG_{379}	—	September 12, 2007	Mount Lemmon	Mount Lemmon Survey	·	1.9 km	MPC · JPL
776035	2007 RJ_{379}	—	September 13, 2007	Mount Lemmon	Mount Lemmon Survey	·	1.3 km	MPC · JPL
776036	2007 RA_{380}	—	September 12, 2007	Mount Lemmon	Mount Lemmon Survey	EOS	1.3 km	MPC · JPL
776037	2007 RO_{380}	—	September 10, 2007	Mount Lemmon	Mount Lemmon Survey	KOR	1.0 km	MPC · JPL
776038	2007 RW_{381}	—	September 12, 2007	Kitt Peak	Spacewatch	·	2.1 km	MPC · JPL
776039	2007 RM_{382}	—	September 13, 2007	Mount Lemmon	Mount Lemmon Survey	EOS	1.3 km	MPC · JPL
776040	2007 RA_{383}	—	May 1, 2016	Cerro Tololo	DECam	·	1.3 km	MPC · JPL
776041	2007 RD_{383}	—	September 14, 2007	Mount Lemmon	Mount Lemmon Survey	·	1.7 km	MPC · JPL
776042	2007 RY_{383}	—	September 9, 2007	Kitt Peak	Spacewatch	·	2.1 km	MPC · JPL
776043	2007 RF_{384}	—	September 13, 2007	Mount Lemmon	Mount Lemmon Survey	·	750 m	MPC · JPL
776044	2007 RE_{386}	—	September 14, 2007	Mount Lemmon	Mount Lemmon Survey	·	750 m	MPC · JPL
776045	2007 SJ_{8}	—	September 18, 2007	Kitt Peak	Spacewatch	·	910 m	MPC · JPL
776046	2007 SY_{24}	—	September 25, 2007	Mount Lemmon	Mount Lemmon Survey	·	1.8 km	MPC · JPL
776047	2007 ST_{26}	—	July 8, 2018	Haleakala	Pan-STARRS 2	·	2.2 km	MPC · JPL
776048	2007 SV_{26}	—	September 9, 2007	Kitt Peak	Spacewatch	TIR	2.1 km	MPC · JPL
776049	2007 SA_{27}	—	September 19, 2007	Kitt Peak	Spacewatch	·	1.4 km	MPC · JPL
776050	2007 SO_{27}	—	March 30, 2011	Mount Lemmon	Mount Lemmon Survey	·	1.9 km	MPC · JPL
776051	2007 SU_{27}	—	February 14, 2013	Haleakala	Pan-STARRS 1	(5)	810 m	MPC · JPL
776052	2007 SZ_{27}	—	September 25, 2007	Mount Lemmon	Mount Lemmon Survey	HNS	930 m	MPC · JPL
776053	2007 SU_{28}	—	September 18, 2007	Kitt Peak	Spacewatch	·	1.1 km	MPC · JPL
776054	2007 TJ_{3}	—	October 2, 2007	Majdanak	Sergeyev, A., Korotkiy, S.	·	2.0 km	MPC · JPL
776055	2007 TR_{3}	—	October 5, 2007	Bergisch Gladbach	W. Bickel	·	2.0 km	MPC · JPL
776056	2007 TF_{40}	—	September 9, 2007	Mount Lemmon	Mount Lemmon Survey	·	1.3 km	MPC · JPL
776057	2007 TV_{42}	—	September 11, 2007	Mount Lemmon	Mount Lemmon Survey	·	1.2 km	MPC · JPL
776058	2007 TX_{47}	—	October 4, 2007	Kitt Peak	Spacewatch	·	2.0 km	MPC · JPL
776059	2007 TZ_{60}	—	November 10, 1999	Kitt Peak	Spacewatch	T_{j} (2.98) · 3:2	3.5 km	MPC · JPL
776060	2007 TG_{81}	—	September 11, 2007	Mount Lemmon	Mount Lemmon Survey	THM	1.5 km	MPC · JPL
776061	2007 TU_{82}	—	October 8, 2007	Catalina	CSS	·	930 m	MPC · JPL
776062	2007 TV_{90}	—	October 8, 2007	Mount Lemmon	Mount Lemmon Survey	EUN	1.0 km	MPC · JPL
776063	2007 TG_{96}	—	October 8, 2007	Mount Lemmon	Mount Lemmon Survey	THM	1.7 km	MPC · JPL
776064	2007 TF_{99}	—	October 8, 2007	Mount Lemmon	Mount Lemmon Survey	·	600 m	MPC · JPL
776065	2007 TV_{99}	—	October 8, 2007	Kitt Peak	Spacewatch	·	2.0 km	MPC · JPL
776066	2007 TS_{117}	—	October 9, 2007	Kitt Peak	Spacewatch	·	1.6 km	MPC · JPL
776067	2007 TS_{125}	—	October 6, 2007	Kitt Peak	Spacewatch	·	970 m	MPC · JPL
776068	2007 TU_{127}	—	October 6, 2007	Kitt Peak	Spacewatch	·	1.9 km	MPC · JPL
776069	2007 TF_{136}	—	September 18, 2007	Catalina	CSS	·	1.8 km	MPC · JPL
776070	2007 TV_{137}	—	October 8, 2007	Mount Lemmon	Mount Lemmon Survey	·	2.0 km	MPC · JPL
776071	2007 TR_{139}	—	October 9, 2007	Kitt Peak	Spacewatch	·	2.3 km	MPC · JPL
776072	2007 TC_{167}	—	September 14, 2007	Mount Lemmon	Mount Lemmon Survey	·	2.0 km	MPC · JPL
776073	2007 TG_{171}	—	October 12, 2007	Dauban	C. Rinner, F. Kugel	·	830 m	MPC · JPL
776074	2007 TR_{175}	—	October 4, 2007	Kitt Peak	Spacewatch	T_{j} (2.98) · 3:2	3.1 km	MPC · JPL
776075	2007 TM_{176}	—	September 8, 2007	Mount Lemmon	Mount Lemmon Survey	·	1.8 km	MPC · JPL
776076	2007 TP_{177}	—	October 6, 2007	Kitt Peak	Spacewatch	·	1.8 km	MPC · JPL
776077	2007 TC_{189}	—	September 26, 2003	Apache Point	SDSS	·	750 m	MPC · JPL
776078	2007 TG_{190}	—	September 18, 2003	Kitt Peak	Spacewatch	·	650 m	MPC · JPL
776079	2007 TC_{197}	—	August 23, 2007	Kitt Peak	Spacewatch	EOS	1.5 km	MPC · JPL
776080	2007 TD_{197}	—	September 22, 2003	Kitt Peak	Spacewatch	(5)	670 m	MPC · JPL
776081	2007 TY_{199}	—	October 8, 2007	Kitt Peak	Spacewatch	·	1.3 km	MPC · JPL
776082	2007 TX_{202}	—	October 8, 2007	Mount Lemmon	Mount Lemmon Survey	·	1.9 km	MPC · JPL
776083	2007 TF_{207}	—	October 10, 2007	Mount Lemmon	Mount Lemmon Survey	·	1.5 km	MPC · JPL
776084	2007 TK_{207}	—	September 10, 2007	Mount Lemmon	Mount Lemmon Survey	KOR	990 m	MPC · JPL
776085	2007 TR_{212}	—	October 7, 2007	Kitt Peak	Spacewatch	EMA	2.2 km	MPC · JPL
776086	2007 TO_{218}	—	October 7, 2007	Kitt Peak	Spacewatch	EUN	900 m	MPC · JPL
776087	2007 TW_{222}	—	October 10, 2007	Kitt Peak	Spacewatch	(5)	720 m	MPC · JPL
776088	2007 TP_{225}	—	October 4, 2007	Kitt Peak	Spacewatch	·	1.7 km	MPC · JPL
776089	2007 TG_{230}	—	October 8, 2007	Kitt Peak	Spacewatch	·	2.1 km	MPC · JPL
776090	2007 TG_{234}	—	September 10, 2007	Mount Lemmon	Mount Lemmon Survey	·	2.1 km	MPC · JPL
776091	2007 TF_{250}	—	October 11, 2007	Mount Lemmon	Mount Lemmon Survey	·	1.2 km	MPC · JPL
776092	2007 TP_{254}	—	October 8, 2007	Mount Lemmon	Mount Lemmon Survey	·	1.7 km	MPC · JPL
776093	2007 TE_{257}	—	October 10, 2007	Kitt Peak	Spacewatch	3:2 · SHU	3.7 km	MPC · JPL
776094	2007 TU_{257}	—	October 10, 2007	Mount Lemmon	Mount Lemmon Survey	·	950 m	MPC · JPL
776095	2007 TR_{261}	—	October 10, 2007	Kitt Peak	Spacewatch	EUN	770 m	MPC · JPL
776096	2007 TA_{270}	—	October 9, 2007	Kitt Peak	Spacewatch	·	1.7 km	MPC · JPL
776097	2007 TK_{271}	—	September 8, 2007	Mount Lemmon	Mount Lemmon Survey	·	810 m	MPC · JPL
776098	2007 TL_{274}	—	September 10, 2007	Kitt Peak	Spacewatch	·	1.0 km	MPC · JPL
776099	2007 TD_{276}	—	October 11, 2007	Mount Lemmon	Mount Lemmon Survey	·	1.0 km	MPC · JPL
776100	2007 TT_{276}	—	October 11, 2007	Mount Lemmon	Mount Lemmon Survey	AGN	850 m	MPC · JPL

== 776101–776200 ==
back to top

Designation			Discovery			Properties		Ref
Permanent	Provisional	Named after	Date	Site	Discoverer(s)	Category	Diam.	Ref
776101	2007 TN_{278}	—	October 11, 2007	Mount Lemmon	Mount Lemmon Survey	·	2.1 km	MPC · JPL
776102	2007 TK_{281}	—	October 7, 2007	Mount Lemmon	Mount Lemmon Survey	EUN	750 m	MPC · JPL
776103	2007 TW_{296}	—	October 10, 2007	Mount Lemmon	Mount Lemmon Survey	·	1.1 km	MPC · JPL
776104	2007 TO_{302}	—	October 4, 2007	Kitt Peak	Spacewatch	·	1.9 km	MPC · JPL
776105	2007 TA_{304}	—	October 12, 2007	Mount Lemmon	Mount Lemmon Survey	·	990 m	MPC · JPL
776106	2007 TX_{309}	—	October 11, 2007	Kitt Peak	Spacewatch	·	2.0 km	MPC · JPL
776107	2007 TH_{310}	—	October 11, 2007	Kitt Peak	Spacewatch	EUN	720 m	MPC · JPL
776108	2007 TN_{312}	—	October 11, 2007	Mount Lemmon	Mount Lemmon Survey	·	1.8 km	MPC · JPL
776109	2007 TH_{318}	—	October 12, 2007	Kitt Peak	Spacewatch	T_{j} (2.99) · 3:2	3.0 km	MPC · JPL
776110	2007 TE_{326}	—	November 15, 2003	Kitt Peak	Spacewatch	·	980 m	MPC · JPL
776111	2007 TY_{330}	—	October 11, 2007	Kitt Peak	Spacewatch	(5)	800 m	MPC · JPL
776112	2007 TG_{333}	—	October 11, 2007	Kitt Peak	Spacewatch	·	1.1 km	MPC · JPL
776113	2007 TZ_{340}	—	October 9, 2007	Mount Lemmon	Mount Lemmon Survey	·	1.3 km	MPC · JPL
776114	2007 TS_{341}	—	October 9, 2007	Mount Lemmon	Mount Lemmon Survey	·	1.2 km	MPC · JPL
776115	2007 TS_{345}	—	October 13, 2007	Mount Lemmon	Mount Lemmon Survey	·	1.2 km	MPC · JPL
776116	2007 TD_{358}	—	October 15, 2007	Mount Lemmon	Mount Lemmon Survey	·	1.4 km	MPC · JPL
776117	2007 TW_{359}	—	October 15, 2007	Mount Lemmon	Mount Lemmon Survey	·	770 m	MPC · JPL
776118	2007 TJ_{378}	—	October 12, 2007	Kitt Peak	Spacewatch	·	1.3 km	MPC · JPL
776119	2007 TF_{380}	—	October 14, 2007	Kitt Peak	Spacewatch	·	1.5 km	MPC · JPL
776120	2007 TX_{382}	—	October 6, 2007	Kitt Peak	Spacewatch	EOS	1.4 km	MPC · JPL
776121	2007 TR_{383}	—	October 10, 2007	Kitt Peak	Spacewatch	·	1.1 km	MPC · JPL
776122	2007 TY_{384}	—	October 14, 2007	Mount Lemmon	Mount Lemmon Survey	·	2.1 km	MPC · JPL
776123	2007 TT_{385}	—	October 15, 2007	Catalina	CSS	·	810 m	MPC · JPL
776124	2007 TY_{385}	—	October 10, 2007	Catalina	CSS	·	1.2 km	MPC · JPL
776125	2007 TW_{387}	—	October 13, 2007	Kitt Peak	Spacewatch	·	750 m	MPC · JPL
776126	2007 TZ_{393}	—	September 15, 2007	Mount Lemmon	Mount Lemmon Survey	T_{j} (2.94)	2.9 km	MPC · JPL
776127	2007 TP_{394}	—	October 15, 2007	Kitt Peak	Spacewatch	THM	1.5 km	MPC · JPL
776128	2007 TF_{396}	—	October 15, 2007	Kitt Peak	Spacewatch	·	1.9 km	MPC · JPL
776129	2007 TJ_{397}	—	October 10, 2007	Catalina	CSS	·	1.9 km	MPC · JPL
776130	2007 TF_{398}	—	October 11, 2007	Kitt Peak	Spacewatch	·	1.7 km	MPC · JPL
776131	2007 TZ_{398}	—	October 15, 2007	Kitt Peak	Spacewatch	·	1.0 km	MPC · JPL
776132	2007 TW_{402}	—	October 15, 2007	Mount Lemmon	Mount Lemmon Survey	(5)	890 m	MPC · JPL
776133	2007 TY_{406}	—	October 15, 2007	Mount Lemmon	Mount Lemmon Survey	·	970 m	MPC · JPL
776134	2007 TK_{407}	—	October 15, 2007	Mount Lemmon	Mount Lemmon Survey	·	2.1 km	MPC · JPL
776135	2007 TD_{410}	—	October 15, 2007	Kitt Peak	Spacewatch	KON	1.4 km	MPC · JPL
776136	2007 TN_{429}	—	October 12, 2007	Kitt Peak	Spacewatch	·	1.7 km	MPC · JPL
776137	2007 TQ_{439}	—	October 8, 2007	Mount Lemmon	Mount Lemmon Survey	THM	1.8 km	MPC · JPL
776138	2007 TQ_{446}	—	October 9, 2007	Lulin	LUSS	·	1.0 km	MPC · JPL
776139	2007 TR_{449}	—	October 10, 2007	Kitt Peak	Spacewatch	·	1.2 km	MPC · JPL
776140	2007 TD_{450}	—	October 11, 2007	Mount Lemmon	Mount Lemmon Survey	·	1.8 km	MPC · JPL
776141	2007 TZ_{452}	—	October 14, 2007	Mount Lemmon	Mount Lemmon Survey	LIX	2.5 km	MPC · JPL
776142	2007 TN_{461}	—	October 12, 2007	Mount Lemmon	Mount Lemmon Survey	TEL	1.1 km	MPC · JPL
776143	2007 TU_{461}	—	February 25, 2014	Haleakala	Pan-STARRS 1	·	950 m	MPC · JPL
776144	2007 TF_{462}	—	October 15, 2007	Mount Lemmon	Mount Lemmon Survey	·	1.3 km	MPC · JPL
776145	2007 TR_{463}	—	March 20, 2014	Mount Lemmon	Mount Lemmon Survey	·	1.4 km	MPC · JPL
776146	2007 TA_{464}	—	October 13, 2007	Kitt Peak	Spacewatch	·	1.3 km	MPC · JPL
776147	2007 TF_{464}	—	November 11, 2013	Mount Lemmon	Mount Lemmon Survey	·	1.8 km	MPC · JPL
776148	2007 TY_{464}	—	October 14, 2007	Kitt Peak	Spacewatch	·	1.5 km	MPC · JPL
776149	2007 TA_{465}	—	October 8, 2007	Mount Lemmon	Mount Lemmon Survey	·	1.3 km	MPC · JPL
776150	2007 TO_{465}	—	October 12, 2007	Mount Lemmon	Mount Lemmon Survey	·	1.5 km	MPC · JPL
776151	2007 TN_{468}	—	October 11, 2007	Mount Lemmon	Mount Lemmon Survey	·	790 m	MPC · JPL
776152	2007 TB_{471}	—	October 12, 2007	Kitt Peak	Spacewatch	THM	1.5 km	MPC · JPL
776153	2007 TB_{472}	—	January 22, 2015	Haleakala	Pan-STARRS 1	·	2.2 km	MPC · JPL
776154	2007 TE_{472}	—	October 12, 2007	Mount Lemmon	Mount Lemmon Survey	·	1.7 km	MPC · JPL
776155	2007 TD_{473}	—	September 21, 2012	Mount Lemmon	Mount Lemmon Survey	·	1.5 km	MPC · JPL
776156	2007 TL_{473}	—	October 8, 2007	Mount Lemmon	Mount Lemmon Survey	EOS	1.3 km	MPC · JPL
776157	2007 TQ_{473}	—	October 12, 2007	Mount Lemmon	Mount Lemmon Survey	·	1.4 km	MPC · JPL
776158	2007 TA_{476}	—	September 20, 2011	Mount Lemmon	Mount Lemmon Survey	·	780 m	MPC · JPL
776159	2007 TN_{478}	—	December 7, 2013	Kitt Peak	Spacewatch	·	1.6 km	MPC · JPL
776160	2007 TY_{479}	—	October 10, 2007	Mount Lemmon	Mount Lemmon Survey	·	2.6 km	MPC · JPL
776161	2007 TC_{480}	—	October 7, 2007	Kitt Peak	Spacewatch	·	2.5 km	MPC · JPL
776162	2007 TF_{480}	—	October 10, 2007	Mount Lemmon	Mount Lemmon Survey	·	1.2 km	MPC · JPL
776163	2007 TH_{480}	—	October 15, 2007	Mount Lemmon	Mount Lemmon Survey	·	1.6 km	MPC · JPL
776164	2007 TL_{481}	—	October 8, 2007	Mount Lemmon	Mount Lemmon Survey	MAR	780 m	MPC · JPL
776165	2007 TC_{482}	—	October 8, 2007	Mount Lemmon	Mount Lemmon Survey	·	1.5 km	MPC · JPL
776166	2007 TD_{482}	—	October 8, 2007	Mount Lemmon	Mount Lemmon Survey	·	2.1 km	MPC · JPL
776167	2007 TE_{482}	—	October 10, 2007	Mount Lemmon	Mount Lemmon Survey	(194)	1.1 km	MPC · JPL
776168	2007 TE_{483}	—	October 15, 2007	Mount Lemmon	Mount Lemmon Survey	EOS	1.4 km	MPC · JPL
776169	2007 TK_{483}	—	October 14, 2007	Mount Lemmon	Mount Lemmon Survey	·	1.8 km	MPC · JPL
776170	2007 TM_{483}	—	October 10, 2007	Mount Lemmon	Mount Lemmon Survey	·	1.4 km	MPC · JPL
776171	2007 TQ_{483}	—	October 8, 2007	Mount Lemmon	Mount Lemmon Survey	TIR	1.9 km	MPC · JPL
776172	2007 TH_{485}	—	October 10, 2007	Kitt Peak	Spacewatch	EOS	1.4 km	MPC · JPL
776173	2007 TT_{485}	—	October 13, 2007	Mount Lemmon	Mount Lemmon Survey	THM	1.6 km	MPC · JPL
776174	2007 TW_{485}	—	October 8, 2007	Kitt Peak	Spacewatch	THM	1.8 km	MPC · JPL
776175	2007 TA_{486}	—	October 8, 2007	Mount Lemmon	Mount Lemmon Survey	·	1.5 km	MPC · JPL
776176	2007 TU_{486}	—	October 12, 2007	Kitt Peak	Spacewatch	THM	1.5 km	MPC · JPL
776177	2007 TE_{487}	—	October 8, 2007	Mount Lemmon	Mount Lemmon Survey	·	1.4 km	MPC · JPL
776178	2007 TT_{489}	—	October 13, 2007	Kitt Peak	Spacewatch	·	1.4 km	MPC · JPL
776179	2007 TQ_{492}	—	October 8, 2007	Mount Lemmon	Mount Lemmon Survey	·	930 m	MPC · JPL
776180	2007 TL_{493}	—	October 8, 2007	Mount Lemmon	Mount Lemmon Survey	(5)	750 m	MPC · JPL
776181	2007 TH_{494}	—	October 8, 2007	Catalina	CSS	·	1.2 km	MPC · JPL
776182	2007 TP_{494}	—	October 15, 2007	Mount Lemmon	Mount Lemmon Survey	·	2.3 km	MPC · JPL
776183	2007 TE_{495}	—	September 13, 2007	Mount Lemmon	Mount Lemmon Survey	·	2.5 km	MPC · JPL
776184	2007 TF_{495}	—	October 12, 2007	Mount Lemmon	Mount Lemmon Survey	·	2.2 km	MPC · JPL
776185	2007 TH_{495}	—	October 11, 2007	Catalina	CSS	·	1.4 km	MPC · JPL
776186	2007 TH_{496}	—	October 12, 2007	Mount Lemmon	Mount Lemmon Survey	·	2.1 km	MPC · JPL
776187	2007 TW_{497}	—	October 12, 2007	Mount Lemmon	Mount Lemmon Survey	·	700 m	MPC · JPL
776188	2007 TK_{498}	—	October 10, 2007	Kitt Peak	Spacewatch	MAR	670 m	MPC · JPL
776189	2007 TV_{499}	—	October 9, 2007	Mount Lemmon	Mount Lemmon Survey	·	760 m	MPC · JPL
776190	2007 TX_{499}	—	October 12, 2007	Kitt Peak	Spacewatch	KON	1.5 km	MPC · JPL
776191	2007 TB_{500}	—	October 10, 2007	Mount Lemmon	Mount Lemmon Survey	·	2.4 km	MPC · JPL
776192	2007 TN_{502}	—	October 10, 2007	Mount Lemmon	Mount Lemmon Survey	·	1.9 km	MPC · JPL
776193	2007 TB_{504}	—	October 12, 2007	Kitt Peak	Spacewatch	·	1.6 km	MPC · JPL
776194	2007 TC_{504}	—	October 13, 2007	Mount Lemmon	Mount Lemmon Survey	·	1.6 km	MPC · JPL
776195	2007 TU_{504}	—	October 8, 2007	Mount Lemmon	Mount Lemmon Survey	KOR	840 m	MPC · JPL
776196	2007 TV_{505}	—	October 12, 2007	Kitt Peak	Spacewatch	·	1.8 km	MPC · JPL
776197	2007 TX_{505}	—	October 8, 2007	Mount Lemmon	Mount Lemmon Survey	·	1.3 km	MPC · JPL
776198	2007 TA_{506}	—	October 11, 2007	Kitt Peak	Spacewatch	3:2	3.5 km	MPC · JPL
776199	2007 TL_{507}	—	October 9, 2007	Mount Lemmon	Mount Lemmon Survey	·	2.3 km	MPC · JPL
776200	2007 TA_{509}	—	October 8, 2007	Mount Lemmon	Mount Lemmon Survey	·	1.7 km	MPC · JPL

== 776201–776300 ==
back to top

Designation			Discovery			Properties		Ref
Permanent	Provisional	Named after	Date	Site	Discoverer(s)	Category	Diam.	Ref
776201	2007 TS_{509}	—	October 9, 2007	Kitt Peak	Spacewatch	VER	1.9 km	MPC · JPL
776202	2007 TT_{509}	—	October 10, 2007	Kitt Peak	Spacewatch	EOS	1.3 km	MPC · JPL
776203	2007 TA_{510}	—	October 8, 2007	Mount Lemmon	Mount Lemmon Survey	·	1.4 km	MPC · JPL
776204	2007 TE_{510}	—	October 12, 2007	Mount Lemmon	Mount Lemmon Survey	·	2.4 km	MPC · JPL
776205	2007 TM_{510}	—	October 4, 2007	Mount Lemmon	Mount Lemmon Survey	·	1.9 km	MPC · JPL
776206	2007 TN_{511}	—	October 9, 2007	Mount Lemmon	Mount Lemmon Survey	·	2.2 km	MPC · JPL
776207	2007 TR_{512}	—	October 8, 2007	Mount Lemmon	Mount Lemmon Survey	·	2.2 km	MPC · JPL
776208	2007 TD_{513}	—	October 7, 2007	Mount Lemmon	Mount Lemmon Survey	·	770 m	MPC · JPL
776209	2007 UA_{4}	—	October 18, 2007	Socorro	LINEAR	·	1.4 km	MPC · JPL
776210	2007 UR_{17}	—	October 18, 2007	Kitt Peak	Spacewatch	·	1.3 km	MPC · JPL
776211	2007 UG_{26}	—	October 18, 2007	Kitt Peak	Spacewatch	·	1.8 km	MPC · JPL
776212	2007 UB_{28}	—	October 16, 2007	Mount Lemmon	Mount Lemmon Survey	EOS	1.4 km	MPC · JPL
776213	2007 UW_{29}	—	October 9, 2007	Mount Lemmon	Mount Lemmon Survey	(5)	740 m	MPC · JPL
776214	2007 UM_{34}	—	October 18, 2007	Kitt Peak	Spacewatch	·	2.1 km	MPC · JPL
776215	2007 UT_{39}	—	October 20, 2007	Mount Lemmon	Mount Lemmon Survey	·	1.5 km	MPC · JPL
776216	2007 UL_{54}	—	October 30, 2007	Kitt Peak	Spacewatch	·	1.8 km	MPC · JPL
776217	2007 UQ_{68}	—	October 30, 2007	Mount Lemmon	Mount Lemmon Survey	EOS	1.3 km	MPC · JPL
776218	2007 UZ_{68}	—	October 10, 2007	Kitt Peak	Spacewatch	·	1.4 km	MPC · JPL
776219	2007 UQ_{69}	—	October 7, 2007	Mount Lemmon	Mount Lemmon Survey	THM	1.4 km	MPC · JPL
776220	2007 UL_{73}	—	October 18, 2007	Kitt Peak	Spacewatch	EOS	1.4 km	MPC · JPL
776221	2007 UP_{75}	—	October 31, 2007	Mount Lemmon	Mount Lemmon Survey	·	1.9 km	MPC · JPL
776222	2007 UF_{82}	—	September 15, 2007	Mount Lemmon	Mount Lemmon Survey	THB	2.2 km	MPC · JPL
776223	2007 UX_{83}	—	October 30, 2007	Kitt Peak	Spacewatch	·	1.7 km	MPC · JPL
776224	2007 US_{85}	—	October 30, 2007	Kitt Peak	Spacewatch	LIX	2.1 km	MPC · JPL
776225	2007 UY_{94}	—	October 31, 2007	Mount Lemmon	Mount Lemmon Survey	·	840 m	MPC · JPL
776226	2007 UE_{97}	—	October 30, 2007	Mount Lemmon	Mount Lemmon Survey	·	1.4 km	MPC · JPL
776227	2007 UO_{102}	—	October 30, 2007	Mount Lemmon	Mount Lemmon Survey	·	1.1 km	MPC · JPL
776228	2007 UJ_{106}	—	October 31, 2007	Mount Lemmon	Mount Lemmon Survey	HYG	2.0 km	MPC · JPL
776229	2007 UH_{107}	—	October 10, 2007	Mount Lemmon	Mount Lemmon Survey	·	1.0 km	MPC · JPL
776230	2007 UN_{109}	—	October 20, 2007	Kitt Peak	Spacewatch	URS	2.5 km	MPC · JPL
776231	2007 UY_{111}	—	October 30, 2007	Mount Lemmon	Mount Lemmon Survey	THM	1.4 km	MPC · JPL
776232	2007 UB_{117}	—	October 30, 2007	Mount Lemmon	Mount Lemmon Survey	·	1.2 km	MPC · JPL
776233	2007 UF_{120}	—	October 5, 2007	Kitt Peak	Spacewatch	·	2.1 km	MPC · JPL
776234	2007 UH_{120}	—	October 30, 2007	Mount Lemmon	Mount Lemmon Survey	·	2.0 km	MPC · JPL
776235	2007 UC_{131}	—	October 20, 2007	Mount Lemmon	Mount Lemmon Survey	·	1.0 km	MPC · JPL
776236	2007 UM_{133}	—	October 30, 2007	Mount Lemmon	Mount Lemmon Survey	·	2.1 km	MPC · JPL
776237	2007 UZ_{138}	—	October 21, 2007	Mount Lemmon	Mount Lemmon Survey	·	720 m	MPC · JPL
776238	2007 UH_{141}	—	October 25, 2007	Mount Lemmon	Mount Lemmon Survey	·	1.8 km	MPC · JPL
776239	2007 UZ_{144}	—	October 21, 2007	Mount Lemmon	Mount Lemmon Survey	TEL	1.1 km	MPC · JPL
776240	2007 UC_{147}	—	September 12, 2013	Mount Lemmon	Mount Lemmon Survey	·	2.4 km	MPC · JPL
776241	2007 UV_{149}	—	October 10, 2015	Haleakala	Pan-STARRS 1	·	870 m	MPC · JPL
776242	2007 UJ_{150}	—	March 14, 2010	Mount Lemmon	Mount Lemmon Survey	·	1.0 km	MPC · JPL
776243	2007 UK_{150}	—	March 1, 2016	Mount Lemmon	Mount Lemmon Survey	·	2.3 km	MPC · JPL
776244	2007 UQ_{150}	—	July 23, 2015	Haleakala	Pan-STARRS 1	·	730 m	MPC · JPL
776245	2007 UZ_{150}	—	December 21, 2008	Kitt Peak	Spacewatch	·	1.5 km	MPC · JPL
776246	2007 UF_{151}	—	October 18, 2007	Kitt Peak	Spacewatch	·	2.3 km	MPC · JPL
776247	2007 UK_{154}	—	October 30, 2007	Mount Lemmon	Mount Lemmon Survey	·	1.3 km	MPC · JPL
776248	2007 UM_{154}	—	February 16, 2015	Haleakala	Pan-STARRS 1	·	1.8 km	MPC · JPL
776249	2007 UB_{155}	—	October 19, 2007	Kitt Peak	Spacewatch	·	2.2 km	MPC · JPL
776250	2007 UG_{156}	—	October 16, 2007	Mount Lemmon	Mount Lemmon Survey	·	2.0 km	MPC · JPL
776251	2007 UR_{156}	—	October 31, 2007	Mount Lemmon	Mount Lemmon Survey	·	1.9 km	MPC · JPL
776252	2007 UV_{156}	—	October 30, 2007	Mount Lemmon	Mount Lemmon Survey	·	1.4 km	MPC · JPL
776253	2007 UX_{156}	—	October 16, 2007	Kitt Peak	Spacewatch	·	1.2 km	MPC · JPL
776254	2007 UA_{157}	—	October 30, 2007	Mount Lemmon	Mount Lemmon Survey	AGN	880 m	MPC · JPL
776255	2007 UA_{160}	—	October 31, 2007	Catalina	CSS	·	1.5 km	MPC · JPL
776256	2007 UP_{160}	—	October 18, 2007	Kitt Peak	Spacewatch	·	790 m	MPC · JPL
776257	2007 UC_{161}	—	October 31, 2007	Mount Lemmon	Mount Lemmon Survey	·	1 km	MPC · JPL
776258	2007 UK_{161}	—	October 18, 2007	Mount Lemmon	Mount Lemmon Survey	EOS	1.2 km	MPC · JPL
776259	2007 UL_{162}	—	October 21, 2007	Kitt Peak	Spacewatch	·	1.8 km	MPC · JPL
776260	2007 UX_{162}	—	October 19, 2007	Kitt Peak	Spacewatch	(5)	750 m	MPC · JPL
776261	2007 UB_{164}	—	October 20, 2007	Mount Lemmon	Mount Lemmon Survey	·	1.1 km	MPC · JPL
776262	2007 UW_{165}	—	October 18, 2007	Kitt Peak	Spacewatch	·	1.2 km	MPC · JPL
776263	2007 US_{166}	—	October 20, 2007	Mount Lemmon	Mount Lemmon Survey	·	1.6 km	MPC · JPL
776264	2007 UD_{167}	—	October 18, 2007	Kitt Peak	Spacewatch	·	2.0 km	MPC · JPL
776265	2007 UP_{167}	—	October 18, 2007	Kitt Peak	Spacewatch	EOS	1.3 km	MPC · JPL
776266	2007 UW_{167}	—	October 20, 2007	Mount Lemmon	Mount Lemmon Survey	EOS	1.4 km	MPC · JPL
776267	2007 UA_{168}	—	October 30, 2007	Mount Lemmon	Mount Lemmon Survey	·	1.7 km	MPC · JPL
776268	2007 UA_{169}	—	October 20, 2007	Mount Lemmon	Mount Lemmon Survey	·	2.5 km	MPC · JPL
776269	2007 UQ_{169}	—	October 18, 2007	Mount Lemmon	Mount Lemmon Survey	·	760 m	MPC · JPL
776270	2007 VP_{10}	—	April 30, 2016	Haleakala	Pan-STARRS 1	EOS	1.4 km	MPC · JPL
776271	2007 VS_{13}	—	November 1, 2007	Mount Lemmon	Mount Lemmon Survey	KOR	940 m	MPC · JPL
776272	2007 VJ_{19}	—	October 10, 2007	Kitt Peak	Spacewatch	·	970 m	MPC · JPL
776273	2007 VJ_{22}	—	October 20, 2007	Kitt Peak	Spacewatch	VER	2.2 km	MPC · JPL
776274	2007 VM_{29}	—	November 3, 2007	Mount Lemmon	Mount Lemmon Survey	·	1.1 km	MPC · JPL
776275	2007 VY_{31}	—	October 9, 2007	Kitt Peak	Spacewatch	·	880 m	MPC · JPL
776276	2007 VP_{33}	—	November 2, 2007	Kitt Peak	Spacewatch	·	1.5 km	MPC · JPL
776277	2007 VK_{34}	—	October 14, 2007	Mount Lemmon	Mount Lemmon Survey	·	1.0 km	MPC · JPL
776278	2007 VX_{34}	—	November 3, 2007	Kitt Peak	Spacewatch	·	930 m	MPC · JPL
776279	2007 VF_{37}	—	October 15, 2007	Catalina	CSS	·	1.1 km	MPC · JPL
776280	2007 VH_{39}	—	October 10, 2007	Kitt Peak	Spacewatch	THM	1.8 km	MPC · JPL
776281	2007 VX_{39}	—	November 3, 2007	Kitt Peak	Spacewatch	·	1.7 km	MPC · JPL
776282	2007 VX_{43}	—	November 1, 2007	Kitt Peak	Spacewatch	·	1.4 km	MPC · JPL
776283	2007 VD_{44}	—	November 1, 2007	Kitt Peak	Spacewatch	·	1.9 km	MPC · JPL
776284	2007 VR_{44}	—	November 1, 2007	Kitt Peak	Spacewatch	·	2.0 km	MPC · JPL
776285	2007 VK_{47}	—	November 1, 2007	Kitt Peak	Spacewatch	EOS	1.2 km	MPC · JPL
776286	2007 VU_{57}	—	November 1, 2007	Kitt Peak	Spacewatch	·	780 m	MPC · JPL
776287	2007 VV_{59}	—	October 18, 2007	Kitt Peak	Spacewatch	·	990 m	MPC · JPL
776288	2007 VE_{61}	—	November 1, 2007	Kitt Peak	Spacewatch	EUN	960 m	MPC · JPL
776289	2007 VE_{66}	—	October 11, 2007	Kitt Peak	Spacewatch	EUN	860 m	MPC · JPL
776290	2007 VU_{67}	—	September 15, 2007	Kitt Peak	Spacewatch	·	650 m	MPC · JPL
776291	2007 VH_{68}	—	November 3, 2007	Mount Lemmon	Mount Lemmon Survey	·	1.1 km	MPC · JPL
776292	2007 VW_{70}	—	October 14, 2007	Kitt Peak	Spacewatch	·	1.9 km	MPC · JPL
776293	2007 VA_{73}	—	November 2, 2007	Kitt Peak	Spacewatch	EOS	1.5 km	MPC · JPL
776294	2007 VO_{74}	—	November 3, 2007	Kitt Peak	Spacewatch	·	1.7 km	MPC · JPL
776295	2007 VQ_{75}	—	November 3, 2007	Kitt Peak	Spacewatch	·	1.8 km	MPC · JPL
776296	2007 VD_{77}	—	October 12, 2007	Kitt Peak	Spacewatch	·	1.2 km	MPC · JPL
776297	2007 VP_{84}	—	October 30, 2007	Mount Lemmon	Mount Lemmon Survey	·	1.4 km	MPC · JPL
776298	2007 VH_{94}	—	September 14, 2007	Mount Lemmon	Mount Lemmon Survey	·	1.6 km	MPC · JPL
776299	2007 VT_{95}	—	October 9, 2007	Kitt Peak	Spacewatch	·	780 m	MPC · JPL
776300	2007 VH_{97}	—	November 1, 2007	Kitt Peak	Spacewatch	·	1.4 km	MPC · JPL

== 776301–776400 ==
back to top

Designation			Discovery			Properties		Ref
Permanent	Provisional	Named after	Date	Site	Discoverer(s)	Category	Diam.	Ref
776301	2007 VM_{97}	—	October 11, 2007	Kitt Peak	Spacewatch	·	2.3 km	MPC · JPL
776302	2007 VK_{101}	—	November 2, 2007	Kitt Peak	Spacewatch	·	1.2 km	MPC · JPL
776303	2007 VN_{103}	—	November 3, 2007	Kitt Peak	Spacewatch	·	1.2 km	MPC · JPL
776304	2007 VL_{106}	—	November 3, 2007	Kitt Peak	Spacewatch	·	1.9 km	MPC · JPL
776305	2007 VT_{109}	—	November 3, 2007	Kitt Peak	Spacewatch	·	860 m	MPC · JPL
776306	2007 VT_{112}	—	November 3, 2007	Kitt Peak	Spacewatch	3:2	3.8 km	MPC · JPL
776307	2007 VW_{117}	—	November 4, 2007	Kitt Peak	Spacewatch	·	960 m	MPC · JPL
776308	2007 VZ_{124}	—	November 1, 2007	Kitt Peak	Spacewatch	·	2.2 km	MPC · JPL
776309	2007 VZ_{130}	—	November 1, 2007	Mount Lemmon	Mount Lemmon Survey	·	1.6 km	MPC · JPL
776310	2007 VC_{146}	—	November 4, 2007	Kitt Peak	Spacewatch	·	1.8 km	MPC · JPL
776311	2007 VT_{147}	—	November 4, 2007	Kitt Peak	Spacewatch	KOR	1.1 km	MPC · JPL
776312	2007 VR_{150}	—	October 31, 2007	Mount Lemmon	Mount Lemmon Survey	VER	2.2 km	MPC · JPL
776313	2007 VB_{152}	—	November 2, 2007	Mount Lemmon	Mount Lemmon Survey	·	1.1 km	MPC · JPL
776314	2007 VS_{154}	—	October 18, 2007	Kitt Peak	Spacewatch	·	1.8 km	MPC · JPL
776315	2007 VZ_{155}	—	November 5, 2007	Kitt Peak	Spacewatch	·	2.1 km	MPC · JPL
776316	2007 VB_{157}	—	November 5, 2007	Kitt Peak	Spacewatch	·	980 m	MPC · JPL
776317	2007 VC_{160}	—	October 20, 2007	Mount Lemmon	Mount Lemmon Survey	·	1.8 km	MPC · JPL
776318	2007 VT_{164}	—	November 5, 2007	Kitt Peak	Spacewatch	(5)	790 m	MPC · JPL
776319	2007 VF_{172}	—	September 25, 2007	Mount Lemmon	Mount Lemmon Survey	(5)	930 m	MPC · JPL
776320	2007 VT_{176}	—	October 18, 2007	Kitt Peak	Spacewatch	·	1.1 km	MPC · JPL
776321	2007 VL_{177}	—	November 5, 2007	Mount Lemmon	Mount Lemmon Survey	·	880 m	MPC · JPL
776322	2007 VJ_{182}	—	October 7, 2007	Mount Lemmon	Mount Lemmon Survey	EUN	750 m	MPC · JPL
776323	2007 VU_{185}	—	October 12, 2007	Mount Lemmon	Mount Lemmon Survey	·	750 m	MPC · JPL
776324	2007 VY_{193}	—	November 5, 2007	Mount Lemmon	Mount Lemmon Survey	·	1.7 km	MPC · JPL
776325	2007 VH_{196}	—	November 7, 2007	Mount Lemmon	Mount Lemmon Survey	·	1.1 km	MPC · JPL
776326	2007 VF_{198}	—	November 8, 2007	Mount Lemmon	Mount Lemmon Survey	·	2.4 km	MPC · JPL
776327	2007 VC_{200}	—	November 9, 2007	Mount Lemmon	Mount Lemmon Survey	THM	1.8 km	MPC · JPL
776328	2007 VB_{201}	—	November 9, 2007	Mount Lemmon	Mount Lemmon Survey	·	910 m	MPC · JPL
776329	2007 VL_{202}	—	November 6, 2007	Mount Lemmon	Mount Lemmon Survey	TIR	2.2 km	MPC · JPL
776330	2007 VN_{203}	—	October 12, 2007	Mount Lemmon	Mount Lemmon Survey	·	1.4 km	MPC · JPL
776331	2007 VF_{204}	—	September 10, 2007	Mount Lemmon	Mount Lemmon Survey	·	760 m	MPC · JPL
776332	2007 VH_{205}	—	November 9, 2007	Mount Lemmon	Mount Lemmon Survey	·	1.7 km	MPC · JPL
776333	2007 VE_{206}	—	October 30, 2007	Mount Lemmon	Mount Lemmon Survey	·	2.1 km	MPC · JPL
776334	2007 VQ_{209}	—	October 16, 2007	Mount Lemmon	Mount Lemmon Survey	·	850 m	MPC · JPL
776335	2007 VA_{212}	—	November 9, 2007	Kitt Peak	Spacewatch	·	720 m	MPC · JPL
776336	2007 VM_{221}	—	November 3, 2007	Kitt Peak	Spacewatch	·	1.4 km	MPC · JPL
776337	2007 VO_{221}	—	October 20, 2007	Mount Lemmon	Mount Lemmon Survey	·	430 m	MPC · JPL
776338	2007 VU_{242}	—	November 13, 2007	Mount Lemmon	Mount Lemmon Survey	·	1.6 km	MPC · JPL
776339	2007 VL_{245}	—	November 14, 2007	Bisei	BATTeRS	·	1.8 km	MPC · JPL
776340	2007 VM_{258}	—	November 2, 2007	Mount Lemmon	Mount Lemmon Survey	·	1.3 km	MPC · JPL
776341	2007 VL_{259}	—	November 2, 2007	Mount Lemmon	Mount Lemmon Survey	·	1.2 km	MPC · JPL
776342	2007 VQ_{259}	—	October 12, 2007	Mount Lemmon	Mount Lemmon Survey	EOS	1.2 km	MPC · JPL
776343	2007 VM_{264}	—	November 2, 2007	Kitt Peak	Spacewatch	·	1.9 km	MPC · JPL
776344	2007 VK_{272}	—	May 22, 2001	Cerro Tololo	Deep Ecliptic Survey	·	1.6 km	MPC · JPL
776345	2007 VS_{274}	—	November 13, 2007	Mount Lemmon	Mount Lemmon Survey	MAR	630 m	MPC · JPL
776346	2007 VY_{277}	—	October 10, 2007	Kitt Peak	Spacewatch	·	1.3 km	MPC · JPL
776347	2007 VR_{279}	—	November 14, 2007	Kitt Peak	Spacewatch	·	1.6 km	MPC · JPL
776348	2007 VW_{280}	—	November 7, 2007	Kitt Peak	Spacewatch	·	1.4 km	MPC · JPL
776349	2007 VB_{283}	—	November 14, 2007	Kitt Peak	Spacewatch	·	1.4 km	MPC · JPL
776350	2007 VM_{283}	—	November 5, 2007	Mount Lemmon	Mount Lemmon Survey	·	1.8 km	MPC · JPL
776351	2007 VR_{283}	—	October 18, 2012	Haleakala	Pan-STARRS 1	·	1.9 km	MPC · JPL
776352	2007 VY_{293}	—	November 5, 2007	Kitt Peak	Spacewatch	·	840 m	MPC · JPL
776353	2007 VJ_{294}	—	November 5, 2007	Kitt Peak	Spacewatch	·	1.8 km	MPC · JPL
776354	2007 VK_{296}	—	October 18, 2007	Kitt Peak	Spacewatch	·	880 m	MPC · JPL
776355	2007 VM_{307}	—	November 3, 2007	Kitt Peak	Spacewatch	THM	1.4 km	MPC · JPL
776356	2007 VK_{308}	—	November 6, 2007	Kitt Peak	Spacewatch	·	1.7 km	MPC · JPL
776357	2007 VT_{322}	—	November 2, 2007	Kitt Peak	Spacewatch	·	1.3 km	MPC · JPL
776358	2007 VU_{322}	—	November 2, 2007	Kitt Peak	Spacewatch	·	1.1 km	MPC · JPL
776359	2007 VY_{336}	—	September 12, 2007	Mount Lemmon	Mount Lemmon Survey	·	1.0 km	MPC · JPL
776360	2007 VG_{343}	—	November 9, 2007	Mount Lemmon	Mount Lemmon Survey	·	2.3 km	MPC · JPL
776361	2007 VU_{344}	—	November 3, 2007	Kitt Peak	Spacewatch	·	1.3 km	MPC · JPL
776362	2007 VL_{345}	—	March 31, 2009	Mount Lemmon	Mount Lemmon Survey	RAF	590 m	MPC · JPL
776363	2007 VV_{346}	—	September 24, 2011	Mayhill-ISON	L. Elenin	·	1.0 km	MPC · JPL
776364	2007 VJ_{347}	—	October 23, 2012	Mount Lemmon	Mount Lemmon Survey	EOS	1.3 km	MPC · JPL
776365	2007 VP_{347}	—	November 2, 2007	Kitt Peak	Spacewatch	(5)	770 m	MPC · JPL
776366	2007 VQ_{347}	—	November 3, 2007	Mount Lemmon	Mount Lemmon Survey	·	940 m	MPC · JPL
776367	2007 VU_{349}	—	November 5, 2007	Kitt Peak	Spacewatch	·	850 m	MPC · JPL
776368	2007 VZ_{349}	—	May 25, 2006	Kitt Peak	Spacewatch	·	1.3 km	MPC · JPL
776369	2007 VK_{351}	—	July 4, 2017	Haleakala	Pan-STARRS 1	HYG	1.8 km	MPC · JPL
776370	2007 VL_{351}	—	November 3, 2007	Mount Lemmon	Mount Lemmon Survey	·	2.7 km	MPC · JPL
776371	2007 VA_{352}	—	September 2, 2011	Haleakala	Pan-STARRS 1	·	1.1 km	MPC · JPL
776372	2007 VJ_{352}	—	November 7, 2007	Kitt Peak	Spacewatch	·	1.4 km	MPC · JPL
776373	2007 VP_{352}	—	November 9, 2007	Mount Lemmon	Mount Lemmon Survey	·	2.8 km	MPC · JPL
776374	2007 VR_{352}	—	March 22, 2014	Piszkés-tető	K. Sárneczky, M. Langbroek	T_{j} (2.97)	2.5 km	MPC · JPL
776375	2007 VS_{353}	—	October 31, 2011	Kitt Peak	Spacewatch	·	800 m	MPC · JPL
776376	2007 VW_{353}	—	November 19, 2017	Haleakala	Pan-STARRS 1	·	1.6 km	MPC · JPL
776377	2007 VM_{354}	—	October 24, 2011	Haleakala	Pan-STARRS 1	BRG	900 m	MPC · JPL
776378	2007 VN_{354}	—	June 5, 2016	Haleakala	Pan-STARRS 1	·	1.4 km	MPC · JPL
776379	2007 VC_{355}	—	November 9, 2007	Kitt Peak	Spacewatch	THM	1.8 km	MPC · JPL
776380	2007 VV_{355}	—	September 23, 2015	Haleakala	Pan-STARRS 1	·	890 m	MPC · JPL
776381	2007 VP_{356}	—	November 14, 2007	Kitt Peak	Spacewatch	·	1.3 km	MPC · JPL
776382	2007 VA_{357}	—	May 4, 2014	Mount Lemmon	Mount Lemmon Survey	EUN	750 m	MPC · JPL
776383	2007 VJ_{357}	—	February 5, 2016	Haleakala	Pan-STARRS 1	SYL	2.9 km	MPC · JPL
776384	2007 VC_{358}	—	July 19, 2015	Haleakala	Pan-STARRS 1	·	1.2 km	MPC · JPL
776385	2007 VD_{358}	—	January 16, 2018	Haleakala	Pan-STARRS 1	AST	1.3 km	MPC · JPL
776386	2007 VQ_{359}	—	April 19, 2015	Cerro Tololo	DECam	·	1.3 km	MPC · JPL
776387	2007 VA_{361}	—	November 1, 2007	Mount Lemmon	Mount Lemmon Survey	·	2.1 km	MPC · JPL
776388	2007 VY_{361}	—	March 27, 2017	Mount Lemmon	Mount Lemmon Survey	·	790 m	MPC · JPL
776389	2007 VA_{362}	—	November 22, 2012	Kitt Peak	Spacewatch	·	1.3 km	MPC · JPL
776390	2007 VF_{363}	—	November 4, 2007	Kitt Peak	Spacewatch	·	1.3 km	MPC · JPL
776391	2007 VM_{363}	—	November 9, 2007	Kitt Peak	Spacewatch	·	1.8 km	MPC · JPL
776392	2007 VC_{365}	—	November 7, 2007	Kitt Peak	Spacewatch	·	2.0 km	MPC · JPL
776393	2007 VF_{365}	—	November 2, 2007	Mount Lemmon	Mount Lemmon Survey	·	2.1 km	MPC · JPL
776394	2007 VK_{365}	—	November 12, 2007	Mount Lemmon	Mount Lemmon Survey	·	1.5 km	MPC · JPL
776395	2007 VC_{366}	—	November 2, 2007	Kitt Peak	Spacewatch	·	1.6 km	MPC · JPL
776396	2007 VJ_{368}	—	November 12, 2007	Mount Lemmon	Mount Lemmon Survey	·	950 m	MPC · JPL
776397	2007 VL_{369}	—	November 5, 2007	Kitt Peak	Spacewatch	·	1.3 km	MPC · JPL
776398	2007 VW_{370}	—	November 1, 2007	Kitt Peak	Spacewatch	·	1.2 km	MPC · JPL
776399	2007 VN_{372}	—	November 12, 2007	Mount Lemmon	Mount Lemmon Survey	·	1.2 km	MPC · JPL
776400	2007 VS_{373}	—	November 2, 2007	Mount Lemmon	Mount Lemmon Survey	·	990 m	MPC · JPL

== 776401–776500 ==
back to top

Designation			Discovery			Properties		Ref
Permanent	Provisional	Named after	Date	Site	Discoverer(s)	Category	Diam.	Ref
776401	2007 VZ_{373}	—	November 7, 2007	Kitt Peak	Spacewatch	·	1.1 km	MPC · JPL
776402	2007 VP_{374}	—	November 5, 2007	Mount Lemmon	Mount Lemmon Survey	EOS	1.3 km	MPC · JPL
776403	2007 VH_{375}	—	November 4, 2007	Kitt Peak	Spacewatch	·	1.8 km	MPC · JPL
776404	2007 VN_{376}	—	November 4, 2007	Mount Lemmon	Mount Lemmon Survey	EOS	1.2 km	MPC · JPL
776405	2007 VW_{380}	—	November 11, 2007	Mount Lemmon	Mount Lemmon Survey	·	2.6 km	MPC · JPL
776406	2007 VU_{381}	—	November 2, 2007	Kitt Peak	Spacewatch	·	1.9 km	MPC · JPL
776407	2007 VV_{382}	—	October 8, 2007	Catalina	CSS	T_{j} (2.98)	2.0 km	MPC · JPL
776408	2007 VJ_{383}	—	November 5, 2007	Kitt Peak	Spacewatch	3:2	4.1 km	MPC · JPL
776409	2007 VT_{383}	—	November 1, 2007	Mount Lemmon	Mount Lemmon Survey	·	1.6 km	MPC · JPL
776410	2007 VG_{384}	—	November 2, 2007	Kitt Peak	Spacewatch	·	2.2 km	MPC · JPL
776411	2007 VP_{384}	—	November 15, 2007	Mount Lemmon	Mount Lemmon Survey	·	2.3 km	MPC · JPL
776412	2007 VR_{384}	—	November 2, 2007	Mount Lemmon	Mount Lemmon Survey	EOS	1.4 km	MPC · JPL
776413	2007 VS_{385}	—	November 4, 2007	Kitt Peak	Spacewatch	·	2.3 km	MPC · JPL
776414	2007 VX_{385}	—	November 3, 2007	Mount Lemmon	Mount Lemmon Survey	·	2.0 km	MPC · JPL
776415	2007 VG_{386}	—	November 2, 2007	Mount Lemmon	Mount Lemmon Survey	·	1.7 km	MPC · JPL
776416	2007 VO_{386}	—	November 8, 2007	Mount Lemmon	Mount Lemmon Survey	·	1.7 km	MPC · JPL
776417	2007 VG_{387}	—	November 5, 2007	Mount Lemmon	Mount Lemmon Survey	·	1.2 km	MPC · JPL
776418	2007 VQ_{387}	—	November 2, 2007	Kitt Peak	Spacewatch	·	2.2 km	MPC · JPL
776419	2007 VU_{387}	—	November 2, 2007	Mount Lemmon	Mount Lemmon Survey	·	2.1 km	MPC · JPL
776420	2007 VS_{388}	—	November 4, 2007	Kitt Peak	Spacewatch	·	2.1 km	MPC · JPL
776421	2007 WU_{2}	—	October 9, 2007	Kitt Peak	Spacewatch	EUN	850 m	MPC · JPL
776422	2007 WY_{11}	—	November 16, 2007	Mount Lemmon	Mount Lemmon Survey	·	1.5 km	MPC · JPL
776423	2007 WS_{14}	—	November 18, 2007	Mount Lemmon	Mount Lemmon Survey	·	900 m	MPC · JPL
776424	2007 WG_{29}	—	November 19, 2007	Kitt Peak	Spacewatch	·	1.6 km	MPC · JPL
776425	2007 WB_{30}	—	October 21, 2007	Mount Lemmon	Mount Lemmon Survey	·	990 m	MPC · JPL
776426	2007 WR_{30}	—	November 2, 2007	Kitt Peak	Spacewatch	·	1.0 km	MPC · JPL
776427	2007 WM_{37}	—	November 19, 2007	Mount Lemmon	Mount Lemmon Survey	MRX	780 m	MPC · JPL
776428	2007 WW_{37}	—	November 8, 2007	Kitt Peak	Spacewatch	·	1.3 km	MPC · JPL
776429	2007 WE_{38}	—	November 19, 2007	Mount Lemmon	Mount Lemmon Survey	·	1.5 km	MPC · JPL
776430	2007 WT_{43}	—	November 4, 2007	Kitt Peak	Spacewatch	HOF	2.0 km	MPC · JPL
776431	2007 WJ_{46}	—	November 3, 2007	Mount Lemmon	Mount Lemmon Survey	·	1.7 km	MPC · JPL
776432	2007 WG_{49}	—	November 20, 2007	Mount Lemmon	Mount Lemmon Survey	·	1.8 km	MPC · JPL
776433	2007 WW_{56}	—	November 7, 2007	Kitt Peak	Spacewatch	·	1.8 km	MPC · JPL
776434	2007 WP_{58}	—	November 17, 2007	Kitt Peak	Spacewatch	·	2.4 km	MPC · JPL
776435	2007 WB_{61}	—	October 20, 2007	Mount Lemmon	Mount Lemmon Survey	·	1.7 km	MPC · JPL
776436	2007 WW_{62}	—	November 19, 2007	Mount Lemmon	Mount Lemmon Survey	·	1.3 km	MPC · JPL
776437	2007 WF_{66}	—	March 22, 2015	Haleakala	Pan-STARRS 1	EOS	1.4 km	MPC · JPL
776438	2007 WF_{67}	—	October 30, 2011	Mount Lemmon	Mount Lemmon Survey	KON	1.8 km	MPC · JPL
776439	2007 WM_{67}	—	November 17, 2007	Mount Lemmon	Mount Lemmon Survey	HNS	730 m	MPC · JPL
776440	2007 WW_{67}	—	October 12, 2015	Haleakala	Pan-STARRS 1	·	710 m	MPC · JPL
776441	2007 WZ_{67}	—	November 20, 2007	Kitt Peak	Spacewatch	·	1.8 km	MPC · JPL
776442	2007 WE_{68}	—	October 8, 2012	Haleakala	Pan-STARRS 1	·	1.3 km	MPC · JPL
776443	2007 WP_{68}	—	November 19, 2007	Mount Lemmon	Mount Lemmon Survey	·	2.6 km	MPC · JPL
776444	2007 WH_{69}	—	September 20, 2015	Catalina	CSS	(5)	1.1 km	MPC · JPL
776445	2007 WU_{69}	—	March 22, 2015	Haleakala	Pan-STARRS 1	·	1.8 km	MPC · JPL
776446	2007 WS_{70}	—	January 29, 2017	Mount Lemmon	Mount Lemmon Survey	·	1.1 km	MPC · JPL
776447	2007 WY_{70}	—	November 8, 2018	Haleakala	Pan-STARRS 2	·	2.4 km	MPC · JPL
776448	2007 WB_{71}	—	November 19, 2007	Mount Lemmon	Mount Lemmon Survey	·	760 m	MPC · JPL
776449	2007 WG_{71}	—	November 18, 2007	Mount Lemmon	Mount Lemmon Survey	·	1.4 km	MPC · JPL
776450	2007 WM_{71}	—	October 16, 2012	Mount Lemmon	Mount Lemmon Survey	·	2.1 km	MPC · JPL
776451	2007 WQ_{71}	—	November 19, 2007	Kitt Peak	Spacewatch	·	910 m	MPC · JPL
776452	2007 WD_{72}	—	November 18, 2007	Mount Lemmon	Mount Lemmon Survey	·	1.4 km	MPC · JPL
776453	2007 WQ_{72}	—	November 18, 2007	Kitt Peak	Spacewatch	·	1.5 km	MPC · JPL
776454	2007 WT_{72}	—	November 19, 2007	Kitt Peak	Spacewatch	·	960 m	MPC · JPL
776455	2007 WH_{73}	—	November 19, 2007	Mount Lemmon	Mount Lemmon Survey	·	1.2 km	MPC · JPL
776456	2007 WZ_{73}	—	November 18, 2007	Kitt Peak	Spacewatch	·	700 m	MPC · JPL
776457	2007 WU_{74}	—	November 17, 2007	Kitt Peak	Spacewatch	HYG	1.8 km	MPC · JPL
776458	2007 WA_{76}	—	November 18, 2007	Kitt Peak	Spacewatch	·	1.1 km	MPC · JPL
776459	2007 XA_{4}	—	December 3, 2007	Kitt Peak	Spacewatch	·	1.5 km	MPC · JPL
776460	2007 XC_{6}	—	October 24, 2007	Mount Lemmon	Mount Lemmon Survey	·	900 m	MPC · JPL
776461	2007 XZ_{28}	—	December 15, 2007	Kitt Peak	Spacewatch	KOR	1.3 km	MPC · JPL
776462	2007 XY_{43}	—	December 15, 2007	Kitt Peak	Spacewatch	·	2.3 km	MPC · JPL
776463	2007 XB_{44}	—	December 15, 2007	Kitt Peak	Spacewatch	·	1.7 km	MPC · JPL
776464	2007 XH_{45}	—	December 15, 2007	Kitt Peak	Spacewatch	·	890 m	MPC · JPL
776465	2007 XF_{48}	—	November 14, 2007	Mount Lemmon	Mount Lemmon Survey	·	1.1 km	MPC · JPL
776466	2007 XB_{49}	—	December 15, 2007	Kitt Peak	Spacewatch	·	2.2 km	MPC · JPL
776467	2007 XY_{51}	—	December 5, 2007	Kitt Peak	Spacewatch	TIR	2.1 km	MPC · JPL
776468	2007 XZ_{53}	—	December 14, 2007	Mount Lemmon	Mount Lemmon Survey	·	2.2 km	MPC · JPL
776469	2007 XY_{54}	—	December 4, 2007	Mount Lemmon	Mount Lemmon Survey	AGN	820 m	MPC · JPL
776470	2007 XP_{59}	—	December 5, 2007	Kitt Peak	Spacewatch	·	1.8 km	MPC · JPL
776471	2007 XB_{64}	—	December 5, 2007	Kitt Peak	Spacewatch	·	1.5 km	MPC · JPL
776472	2007 XO_{66}	—	October 22, 2012	Haleakala	Pan-STARRS 1	·	1.5 km	MPC · JPL
776473	2007 XY_{66}	—	December 5, 2007	Kitt Peak	Spacewatch	T_{j} (2.98)	2.8 km	MPC · JPL
776474	2007 XD_{67}	—	December 6, 2007	Mount Lemmon	Mount Lemmon Survey	EUP	2.7 km	MPC · JPL
776475	2007 XN_{68}	—	October 9, 2015	Haleakala	Pan-STARRS 1	·	830 m	MPC · JPL
776476	2007 XT_{69}	—	December 5, 2007	Kitt Peak	Spacewatch	·	2.1 km	MPC · JPL
776477	2007 XP_{70}	—	December 5, 2007	Kitt Peak	Spacewatch	·	2.1 km	MPC · JPL
776478	2007 XK_{71}	—	December 15, 2007	Mount Lemmon	Mount Lemmon Survey	·	1.7 km	MPC · JPL
776479	2007 YS_{2}	—	December 16, 2007	Bergisch Gladbach	W. Bickel	·	1.8 km	MPC · JPL
776480	2007 YX_{13}	—	December 17, 2007	Mount Lemmon	Mount Lemmon Survey	(5)	1.0 km	MPC · JPL
776481	2007 YF_{15}	—	December 16, 2007	Kitt Peak	Spacewatch	·	1.4 km	MPC · JPL
776482	2007 YO_{38}	—	December 30, 2007	Mount Lemmon	Mount Lemmon Survey	·	2.3 km	MPC · JPL
776483	2007 YW_{39}	—	December 30, 2007	Mount Lemmon	Mount Lemmon Survey	·	1.7 km	MPC · JPL
776484	2007 YW_{66}	—	December 30, 2007	Kitt Peak	Spacewatch	·	930 m	MPC · JPL
776485	2007 YY_{69}	—	December 31, 2007	Mount Lemmon	Mount Lemmon Survey	·	2.2 km	MPC · JPL
776486	2007 YB_{70}	—	December 31, 2007	Mount Lemmon	Mount Lemmon Survey	·	2.3 km	MPC · JPL
776487	2007 YP_{71}	—	December 17, 2007	Mount Lemmon	Mount Lemmon Survey	T_{j} (2.98)	2.4 km	MPC · JPL
776488	2007 YG_{75}	—	October 22, 2019	Mount Lemmon	Mount Lemmon Survey	·	1.1 km	MPC · JPL
776489	2007 YE_{81}	—	December 18, 2007	Mount Lemmon	Mount Lemmon Survey	3:2	4.1 km	MPC · JPL
776490	2007 YH_{81}	—	December 31, 2007	Kitt Peak	Spacewatch	(5)	790 m	MPC · JPL
776491	2007 YS_{81}	—	October 18, 2012	Mount Lemmon	Mount Lemmon Survey	·	2.2 km	MPC · JPL
776492	2007 YC_{82}	—	December 18, 2007	Kitt Peak	Spacewatch	·	800 m	MPC · JPL
776493	2007 YA_{83}	—	October 17, 2012	Mount Lemmon	Mount Lemmon Survey	·	1.6 km	MPC · JPL
776494	2007 YJ_{83}	—	December 16, 2007	Kitt Peak	Spacewatch	·	790 m	MPC · JPL
776495	2007 YU_{83}	—	October 9, 2015	Haleakala	Pan-STARRS 1	·	820 m	MPC · JPL
776496	2007 YY_{83}	—	June 17, 2018	Haleakala	Pan-STARRS 1	·	1.1 km	MPC · JPL
776497	2007 YN_{84}	—	October 10, 2012	Mount Lemmon	Mount Lemmon Survey	·	1.8 km	MPC · JPL
776498	2007 YZ_{84}	—	December 17, 2007	Kitt Peak	Spacewatch	·	2.0 km	MPC · JPL
776499	2007 YF_{85}	—	October 25, 2011	Haleakala	Pan-STARRS 1	·	870 m	MPC · JPL
776500	2007 YQ_{85}	—	November 8, 2015	Kitt Peak	Spacewatch	·	1.0 km	MPC · JPL

== 776501–776600 ==
back to top

Designation			Discovery			Properties		Ref
Permanent	Provisional	Named after	Date	Site	Discoverer(s)	Category	Diam.	Ref
776501	2007 YS_{85}	—	November 29, 2011	Mount Lemmon	Mount Lemmon Survey	MAR	710 m	MPC · JPL
776502	2007 YT_{85}	—	March 21, 2017	Haleakala	Pan-STARRS 1	·	890 m	MPC · JPL
776503	2007 YV_{85}	—	September 21, 2017	Haleakala	Pan-STARRS 1	EOS	1.5 km	MPC · JPL
776504	2007 YT_{86}	—	December 31, 2007	Mount Lemmon	Mount Lemmon Survey	·	1.6 km	MPC · JPL
776505	2007 YX_{86}	—	November 28, 2011	Mount Lemmon	Mount Lemmon Survey	EUN	750 m	MPC · JPL
776506	2007 YQ_{87}	—	June 11, 2015	Haleakala	Pan-STARRS 1	·	2.0 km	MPC · JPL
776507	2007 YQ_{88}	—	October 9, 2015	Haleakala	Pan-STARRS 1	·	840 m	MPC · JPL
776508	2007 YK_{89}	—	February 21, 2017	Haleakala	Pan-STARRS 1	·	910 m	MPC · JPL
776509	2007 YE_{90}	—	January 24, 2014	Haleakala	Pan-STARRS 1	·	1.6 km	MPC · JPL
776510	2007 YG_{90}	—	February 21, 2014	Mount Lemmon	Mount Lemmon Survey	T_{j} (2.98)	2.6 km	MPC · JPL
776511	2007 YW_{91}	—	December 18, 2007	Mount Lemmon	Mount Lemmon Survey	·	2.5 km	MPC · JPL
776512	2007 YR_{92}	—	December 16, 2007	Kitt Peak	Spacewatch	·	2.1 km	MPC · JPL
776513	2007 YG_{93}	—	December 30, 2007	Kitt Peak	Spacewatch	·	1.5 km	MPC · JPL
776514	2007 YJ_{93}	—	December 31, 2007	Kitt Peak	Spacewatch	·	1.4 km	MPC · JPL
776515	2007 YB_{94}	—	December 20, 2007	Kitt Peak	Spacewatch	·	2.4 km	MPC · JPL
776516	2007 YQ_{94}	—	December 30, 2007	Mount Lemmon	Mount Lemmon Survey	·	970 m	MPC · JPL
776517	2007 YZ_{94}	—	December 30, 2007	Kitt Peak	Spacewatch	·	860 m	MPC · JPL
776518	2007 YA_{95}	—	December 31, 2007	Mount Lemmon	Mount Lemmon Survey	ADE	1.4 km	MPC · JPL
776519	2007 YM_{95}	—	December 16, 2007	Kitt Peak	Spacewatch	·	680 m	MPC · JPL
776520	2007 YW_{95}	—	December 19, 2007	Kitt Peak	Spacewatch	·	1.8 km	MPC · JPL
776521	2007 YG_{96}	—	December 31, 2007	Kitt Peak	Spacewatch	·	2.8 km	MPC · JPL
776522	2007 YP_{97}	—	December 16, 2007	Mount Lemmon	Mount Lemmon Survey	·	2.0 km	MPC · JPL
776523	2007 YW_{97}	—	December 19, 2007	Kitt Peak	Spacewatch	·	970 m	MPC · JPL
776524	2007 YX_{98}	—	December 17, 2007	Kitt Peak	Spacewatch	·	880 m	MPC · JPL
776525	2008 AA_{21}	—	January 10, 2008	Mount Lemmon	Mount Lemmon Survey	DOR	2.0 km	MPC · JPL
776526	2008 AM_{21}	—	January 10, 2008	Mount Lemmon	Mount Lemmon Survey	·	1.4 km	MPC · JPL
776527	2008 AA_{22}	—	January 10, 2008	Mount Lemmon	Mount Lemmon Survey	·	2.2 km	MPC · JPL
776528	2008 AS_{29}	—	January 12, 2008	Pla D'Arguines	R. Ferrando, Ferrando, M.	·	1.4 km	MPC · JPL
776529	2008 AU_{37}	—	January 10, 2008	Mount Lemmon	Mount Lemmon Survey	·	2.3 km	MPC · JPL
776530	2008 AH_{40}	—	January 10, 2008	Mount Lemmon	Mount Lemmon Survey	·	1.9 km	MPC · JPL
776531	2008 AK_{40}	—	January 10, 2008	Mount Lemmon	Mount Lemmon Survey	·	1.2 km	MPC · JPL
776532	2008 AU_{45}	—	January 11, 2008	Kitt Peak	Spacewatch	·	2.7 km	MPC · JPL
776533	2008 AY_{46}	—	January 11, 2008	Kitt Peak	Spacewatch	·	2.1 km	MPC · JPL
776534	2008 AC_{47}	—	January 11, 2008	Kitt Peak	Spacewatch	TIR	2.2 km	MPC · JPL
776535	2008 AV_{52}	—	January 11, 2008	Kitt Peak	Spacewatch	THM	1.6 km	MPC · JPL
776536	2008 AF_{53}	—	January 11, 2008	Kitt Peak	Spacewatch	·	1.4 km	MPC · JPL
776537	2008 AG_{53}	—	January 11, 2008	Kitt Peak	Spacewatch	·	730 m	MPC · JPL
776538	2008 AX_{53}	—	January 11, 2008	Kitt Peak	Spacewatch	·	2.2 km	MPC · JPL
776539	2008 AU_{56}	—	March 29, 2009	Kitt Peak	Spacewatch	·	1.6 km	MPC · JPL
776540	2008 AH_{57}	—	January 11, 2008	Kitt Peak	Spacewatch	(5)	820 m	MPC · JPL
776541	2008 AB_{58}	—	January 11, 2008	Kitt Peak	Spacewatch	·	1.7 km	MPC · JPL
776542	2008 AP_{61}	—	January 11, 2008	Kitt Peak	Spacewatch	EUN	760 m	MPC · JPL
776543	2008 AA_{66}	—	January 11, 2008	Kitt Peak	Spacewatch	·	2.5 km	MPC · JPL
776544	2008 AB_{66}	—	January 11, 2008	Kitt Peak	Spacewatch	·	1.9 km	MPC · JPL
776545	2008 AN_{70}	—	January 12, 2008	Mount Lemmon	Mount Lemmon Survey	(7744)	1.0 km	MPC · JPL
776546	2008 AG_{73}	—	December 30, 2007	Kitt Peak	Spacewatch	·	1.0 km	MPC · JPL
776547	2008 AM_{82}	—	January 14, 2008	Kitt Peak	Spacewatch	·	1.6 km	MPC · JPL
776548	2008 AR_{92}	—	December 19, 2007	Mount Lemmon	Mount Lemmon Survey	JUN	660 m	MPC · JPL
776549	2008 AS_{92}	—	December 16, 2007	Mount Lemmon	Mount Lemmon Survey	·	2.0 km	MPC · JPL
776550	2008 AB_{94}	—	December 19, 2007	Mount Lemmon	Mount Lemmon Survey	·	1.1 km	MPC · JPL
776551	2008 AN_{94}	—	December 31, 2007	Mount Lemmon	Mount Lemmon Survey	·	2.4 km	MPC · JPL
776552	2008 AC_{96}	—	January 14, 2008	Kitt Peak	Spacewatch	·	1.1 km	MPC · JPL
776553	2008 AH_{114}	—	January 14, 2008	Kitt Peak	Spacewatch	LIX	2.6 km	MPC · JPL
776554	2008 AX_{117}	—	January 10, 2008	Mount Lemmon	Mount Lemmon Survey	THB	2.2 km	MPC · JPL
776555	2008 AV_{118}	—	January 6, 2008	Mauna Kea	P. A. Wiegert	·	950 m	MPC · JPL
776556	2008 AQ_{120}	—	January 6, 2008	Mauna Kea	P. A. Wiegert	·	2.0 km	MPC · JPL
776557	2008 AX_{122}	—	January 6, 2008	Mauna Kea	P. A. Wiegert	AGN	820 m	MPC · JPL
776558	2008 AT_{127}	—	January 11, 2008	Kitt Peak	Spacewatch	·	2.2 km	MPC · JPL
776559	2008 AW_{127}	—	January 11, 2008	Kitt Peak	Spacewatch	·	2.0 km	MPC · JPL
776560	2008 AP_{138}	—	March 4, 2014	Cerro Tololo	High Cadence Transient Survey	·	2.2 km	MPC · JPL
776561	2008 AH_{139}	—	January 1, 2008	Mount Lemmon	Mount Lemmon Survey	·	1.2 km	MPC · JPL
776562	2008 AQ_{140}	—	January 1, 2008	Kitt Peak	Spacewatch	·	2.2 km	MPC · JPL
776563	2008 AF_{142}	—	July 2, 2005	Kitt Peak	Spacewatch	TIR	2.3 km	MPC · JPL
776564	2008 AA_{143}	—	July 2, 2011	Kitt Peak	Spacewatch	·	2.7 km	MPC · JPL
776565	2008 AL_{143}	—	December 13, 2015	Haleakala	Pan-STARRS 1	·	970 m	MPC · JPL
776566	2008 AP_{144}	—	January 15, 2008	Kitt Peak	Spacewatch	(31811)	2.1 km	MPC · JPL
776567	2008 AK_{145}	—	November 10, 2017	Haleakala	Pan-STARRS 1	·	2.7 km	MPC · JPL
776568	2008 AP_{145}	—	October 8, 2015	Haleakala	Pan-STARRS 1	EUN	810 m	MPC · JPL
776569	2008 AQ_{145}	—	May 20, 2014	Haleakala	Pan-STARRS 1	·	1.3 km	MPC · JPL
776570	2008 AR_{145}	—	March 24, 2014	Haleakala	Pan-STARRS 1	·	1.7 km	MPC · JPL
776571	2008 AU_{146}	—	January 10, 2008	Kitt Peak	Spacewatch	LIX	2.5 km	MPC · JPL
776572	2008 AS_{147}	—	January 11, 2008	Mount Lemmon	Mount Lemmon Survey	·	2.5 km	MPC · JPL
776573	2008 AT_{147}	—	October 26, 2011	Haleakala	Pan-STARRS 1	·	1.4 km	MPC · JPL
776574	2008 AJ_{148}	—	June 7, 2016	Haleakala	Pan-STARRS 1	·	2.0 km	MPC · JPL
776575	2008 AO_{148}	—	January 10, 2008	Mount Lemmon	Mount Lemmon Survey	·	910 m	MPC · JPL
776576	2008 AU_{148}	—	January 31, 2008	Mount Lemmon	Mount Lemmon Survey	THM	1.8 km	MPC · JPL
776577	2008 AW_{148}	—	October 3, 2015	Kitt Peak	Spacewatch	·	920 m	MPC · JPL
776578	2008 AJ_{149}	—	March 25, 2017	Mount Lemmon	Mount Lemmon Survey	3:2	4.1 km	MPC · JPL
776579	2008 AO_{149}	—	January 14, 2008	Kitt Peak	Spacewatch	·	1.8 km	MPC · JPL
776580	2008 AY_{150}	—	January 14, 2008	Kitt Peak	Spacewatch	·	1.0 km	MPC · JPL
776581	2008 AG_{151}	—	January 1, 2008	Mount Lemmon	Mount Lemmon Survey	·	2.4 km	MPC · JPL
776582	2008 AH_{151}	—	January 10, 2008	Mount Lemmon	Mount Lemmon Survey	THB	2.2 km	MPC · JPL
776583	2008 AN_{151}	—	January 15, 2008	Mount Lemmon	Mount Lemmon Survey	MIS	1.6 km	MPC · JPL
776584	2008 AN_{152}	—	January 15, 2008	Mount Lemmon	Mount Lemmon Survey	·	2.1 km	MPC · JPL
776585	2008 AG_{153}	—	August 8, 2005	Cerro Tololo	Deep Ecliptic Survey	·	1.2 km	MPC · JPL
776586	2008 AF_{154}	—	January 10, 2008	Kitt Peak	Spacewatch	·	2.4 km	MPC · JPL
776587	2008 AK_{154}	—	January 11, 2008	Mount Lemmon	Mount Lemmon Survey	URS	2.2 km	MPC · JPL
776588	2008 AM_{154}	—	January 1, 2008	Kitt Peak	Spacewatch	·	2.2 km	MPC · JPL
776589	2008 AM_{158}	—	January 14, 2008	Kitt Peak	Spacewatch	·	1.7 km	MPC · JPL
776590	2008 AZ_{158}	—	January 10, 2008	Mount Lemmon	Mount Lemmon Survey	·	2.2 km	MPC · JPL
776591	2008 AA_{159}	—	January 11, 2008	Kitt Peak	Spacewatch	VER	2.1 km	MPC · JPL
776592	2008 AB_{159}	—	January 15, 2008	Mount Lemmon	Mount Lemmon Survey	·	2.4 km	MPC · JPL
776593	2008 AQ_{159}	—	January 11, 2008	Kitt Peak	Spacewatch	3:2	3.8 km	MPC · JPL
776594	2008 BT	—	January 16, 2008	Mount Lemmon	Mount Lemmon Survey	RAF	560 m	MPC · JPL
776595	2008 BL_{1}	—	January 16, 2008	Mount Lemmon	Mount Lemmon Survey	·	2.6 km	MPC · JPL
776596	2008 BB_{5}	—	January 16, 2008	Kitt Peak	Spacewatch	·	1.9 km	MPC · JPL
776597	2008 BW_{7}	—	January 16, 2008	Kitt Peak	Spacewatch	·	1.2 km	MPC · JPL
776598	2008 BW_{13}	—	January 11, 2008	Mount Lemmon	Mount Lemmon Survey	·	1.9 km	MPC · JPL
776599	2008 BT_{23}	—	January 31, 2008	Mount Lemmon	Mount Lemmon Survey	·	2.6 km	MPC · JPL
776600	2008 BM_{27}	—	January 11, 2008	Kitt Peak	Spacewatch	EOS	1.2 km	MPC · JPL

== 776601–776700 ==
back to top

Designation			Discovery			Properties		Ref
Permanent	Provisional	Named after	Date	Site	Discoverer(s)	Category	Diam.	Ref
776601	2008 BQ_{27}	—	January 30, 2008	Mount Lemmon	Mount Lemmon Survey	VER	1.9 km	MPC · JPL
776602	2008 BK_{30}	—	January 10, 2008	Kitt Peak	Spacewatch	EOS	1.3 km	MPC · JPL
776603	2008 BG_{39}	—	November 11, 2007	Mount Lemmon	Mount Lemmon Survey	·	1.0 km	MPC · JPL
776604	2008 BW_{39}	—	January 14, 2008	Kitt Peak	Spacewatch	T_{j} (2.95)	3.2 km	MPC · JPL
776605	2008 BR_{50}	—	January 15, 2008	Mount Lemmon	Mount Lemmon Survey	·	1.6 km	MPC · JPL
776606	2008 BU_{51}	—	January 18, 2008	Mount Lemmon	Mount Lemmon Survey	EUP	2.8 km	MPC · JPL
776607	2008 BM_{57}	—	November 1, 2015	Mount Lemmon	Mount Lemmon Survey	·	1.2 km	MPC · JPL
776608	2008 BX_{57}	—	December 16, 2007	Kitt Peak	Spacewatch	URS	2.4 km	MPC · JPL
776609	2008 BE_{58}	—	August 17, 2017	Haleakala	Pan-STARRS 1	TIR	2.2 km	MPC · JPL
776610	2008 BC_{59}	—	October 3, 2015	Haleakala	Pan-STARRS 1	(1547)	1.0 km	MPC · JPL
776611	2008 BL_{59}	—	December 13, 2015	Haleakala	Pan-STARRS 1	·	820 m	MPC · JPL
776612	2008 BQ_{60}	—	January 30, 2008	Mount Lemmon	Mount Lemmon Survey	·	1.0 km	MPC · JPL
776613	2008 BT_{60}	—	January 18, 2008	Kitt Peak	Spacewatch	·	1.9 km	MPC · JPL
776614	2008 BB_{61}	—	January 16, 2008	Kitt Peak	Spacewatch	HNS	780 m	MPC · JPL
776615	2008 BN_{61}	—	January 18, 2008	Mount Lemmon	Mount Lemmon Survey	·	940 m	MPC · JPL
776616	2008 BF_{62}	—	January 17, 2008	Mount Lemmon	Mount Lemmon Survey	·	1.1 km	MPC · JPL
776617	2008 CL_{1}	—	February 2, 2008	Socorro	LINEAR	ATE	460 m	MPC · JPL
776618	2008 CP_{4}	—	February 2, 2008	Mount Lemmon	Mount Lemmon Survey	·	1.5 km	MPC · JPL
776619	2008 CV_{4}	—	January 18, 2008	Kitt Peak	Spacewatch	·	960 m	MPC · JPL
776620	2008 CY_{6}	—	February 1, 2008	Kitt Peak	Spacewatch	(1547)	1.1 km	MPC · JPL
776621	2008 CQ_{7}	—	February 2, 2008	Kitt Peak	Spacewatch	·	1.0 km	MPC · JPL
776622	2008 CJ_{11}	—	January 27, 2004	Kitt Peak	Spacewatch	·	940 m	MPC · JPL
776623	2008 CZ_{12}	—	February 3, 2008	Mount Lemmon	Mount Lemmon Survey	·	2.2 km	MPC · JPL
776624	2008 CF_{13}	—	February 3, 2008	Mount Lemmon	Mount Lemmon Survey	·	2.6 km	MPC · JPL
776625	2008 CG_{16}	—	June 2, 2014	Haleakala	Pan-STARRS 1	·	1.6 km	MPC · JPL
776626	2008 CM_{26}	—	February 2, 2008	Kitt Peak	Spacewatch	·	880 m	MPC · JPL
776627	2008 CY_{26}	—	January 13, 2008	Kitt Peak	Spacewatch	(5)	970 m	MPC · JPL
776628	2008 CM_{31}	—	February 2, 2008	Kitt Peak	Spacewatch	·	3.3 km	MPC · JPL
776629	2008 CZ_{35}	—	January 11, 2008	Mount Lemmon	Mount Lemmon Survey	BRA	1.2 km	MPC · JPL
776630	2008 CN_{36}	—	February 2, 2008	Kitt Peak	Spacewatch	HOF	1.9 km	MPC · JPL
776631	2008 CS_{36}	—	February 2, 2008	Kitt Peak	Spacewatch	·	990 m	MPC · JPL
776632	2008 CF_{37}	—	February 2, 2008	Kitt Peak	Spacewatch	·	2.3 km	MPC · JPL
776633	2008 CC_{38}	—	February 2, 2008	Mount Lemmon	Mount Lemmon Survey	·	1.9 km	MPC · JPL
776634	2008 CN_{39}	—	February 2, 2008	Mount Lemmon	Mount Lemmon Survey	EUN	930 m	MPC · JPL
776635	2008 CU_{39}	—	February 2, 2008	Mount Lemmon	Mount Lemmon Survey	HOF	1.9 km	MPC · JPL
776636	2008 CW_{42}	—	February 2, 2008	Kitt Peak	Spacewatch	·	1.3 km	MPC · JPL
776637	2008 CH_{43}	—	February 2, 2008	Kitt Peak	Spacewatch	·	1.1 km	MPC · JPL
776638	2008 CX_{43}	—	February 2, 2008	Kitt Peak	Spacewatch	·	2.7 km	MPC · JPL
776639	2008 CX_{54}	—	February 7, 2008	Mount Lemmon	Mount Lemmon Survey	·	1.3 km	MPC · JPL
776640	2008 CH_{55}	—	February 7, 2008	Mount Lemmon	Mount Lemmon Survey	·	1.5 km	MPC · JPL
776641	2008 CU_{56}	—	January 18, 2008	Kitt Peak	Spacewatch	EUN	820 m	MPC · JPL
776642	2008 CB_{59}	—	January 10, 2008	Kitt Peak	Spacewatch	THB	2.1 km	MPC · JPL
776643	2008 CR_{59}	—	February 7, 2008	Mount Lemmon	Mount Lemmon Survey	·	2.2 km	MPC · JPL
776644	2008 CB_{64}	—	February 8, 2008	Mount Lemmon	Mount Lemmon Survey	EUP	2.5 km	MPC · JPL
776645 Michaelkarrer	2008 CP_{69}	Michaelkarrer	February 8, 2008	Gaisberg	Gierlinger, R.	·	1.7 km	MPC · JPL
776646	2008 CN_{72}	—	December 31, 2007	Kitt Peak	Spacewatch	·	2.1 km	MPC · JPL
776647	2008 CS_{72}	—	February 7, 2008	Mount Lemmon	Mount Lemmon Survey	·	1.2 km	MPC · JPL
776648	2008 CE_{79}	—	February 7, 2008	Kitt Peak	Spacewatch	·	1.1 km	MPC · JPL
776649	2008 CR_{79}	—	February 7, 2008	Kitt Peak	Spacewatch	·	920 m	MPC · JPL
776650	2008 CF_{88}	—	February 7, 2008	Mount Lemmon	Mount Lemmon Survey	EMA	2.2 km	MPC · JPL
776651	2008 CK_{88}	—	February 7, 2008	Mount Lemmon	Mount Lemmon Survey	·	2.3 km	MPC · JPL
776652	2008 CT_{92}	—	February 8, 2008	Kitt Peak	Spacewatch	·	1 km	MPC · JPL
776653	2008 CZ_{94}	—	February 8, 2008	Mount Lemmon	Mount Lemmon Survey	·	1.2 km	MPC · JPL
776654	2008 CB_{102}	—	February 9, 2008	Mount Lemmon	Mount Lemmon Survey	·	950 m	MPC · JPL
776655	2008 CK_{102}	—	February 9, 2008	Mount Lemmon	Mount Lemmon Survey	·	900 m	MPC · JPL
776656	2008 CA_{103}	—	February 9, 2008	Kitt Peak	Spacewatch	·	1.0 km	MPC · JPL
776657	2008 CC_{109}	—	February 9, 2008	Kitt Peak	Spacewatch	·	1.6 km	MPC · JPL
776658	2008 CA_{113}	—	February 10, 2008	Kitt Peak	Spacewatch	·	1.2 km	MPC · JPL
776659	2008 CY_{125}	—	February 8, 2008	Kitt Peak	Spacewatch	HOF	1.8 km	MPC · JPL
776660	2008 CM_{127}	—	February 8, 2008	Kitt Peak	Spacewatch	·	2.1 km	MPC · JPL
776661	2008 CN_{133}	—	January 30, 2008	Mount Lemmon	Mount Lemmon Survey	·	1.2 km	MPC · JPL
776662	2008 CH_{134}	—	February 8, 2008	Mount Lemmon	Mount Lemmon Survey	URS	2.1 km	MPC · JPL
776663	2008 CX_{141}	—	February 8, 2008	Kitt Peak	Spacewatch	·	1.4 km	MPC · JPL
776664	2008 CF_{145}	—	February 9, 2008	Kitt Peak	Spacewatch	·	1.2 km	MPC · JPL
776665	2008 CY_{145}	—	February 9, 2008	Kitt Peak	Spacewatch	·	1.1 km	MPC · JPL
776666	2008 CL_{146}	—	February 9, 2008	Kitt Peak	Spacewatch	·	2.0 km	MPC · JPL
776667	2008 CW_{151}	—	February 9, 2008	Kitt Peak	Spacewatch	·	900 m	MPC · JPL
776668	2008 CA_{152}	—	November 22, 2006	Kitt Peak	Spacewatch	HOF	1.9 km	MPC · JPL
776669	2008 CD_{153}	—	February 9, 2008	Kitt Peak	Spacewatch	·	1.0 km	MPC · JPL
776670	2008 CL_{154}	—	February 9, 2008	Mount Lemmon	Mount Lemmon Survey	·	1.8 km	MPC · JPL
776671	2008 CH_{155}	—	February 9, 2008	Mount Lemmon	Mount Lemmon Survey	EUN	790 m	MPC · JPL
776672	2008 CR_{160}	—	February 9, 2008	Kitt Peak	Spacewatch	·	1.5 km	MPC · JPL
776673	2008 CB_{162}	—	February 10, 2008	Kitt Peak	Spacewatch	·	940 m	MPC · JPL
776674	2008 CY_{162}	—	January 10, 2008	Mount Lemmon	Mount Lemmon Survey	EUP	2.5 km	MPC · JPL
776675 Jędrzejewicz	2008 CN_{164}	Jędrzejewicz	October 19, 2017	Baldone	K. Černis, I. Eglītis	VER	1.8 km	MPC · JPL
776676	2008 CR_{167}	—	February 11, 2008	Mount Lemmon	Mount Lemmon Survey	·	1.1 km	MPC · JPL
776677	2008 CU_{167}	—	February 11, 2008	Mount Lemmon	Mount Lemmon Survey	·	870 m	MPC · JPL
776678	2008 CM_{169}	—	March 18, 2004	Kitt Peak	Spacewatch	·	960 m	MPC · JPL
776679	2008 CO_{169}	—	February 12, 2008	Mount Lemmon	Mount Lemmon Survey	·	810 m	MPC · JPL
776680	2008 CX_{171}	—	February 12, 2008	Mount Lemmon	Mount Lemmon Survey	·	1.1 km	MPC · JPL
776681	2008 CM_{173}	—	February 13, 2008	Mount Lemmon	Mount Lemmon Survey	·	1.5 km	MPC · JPL
776682	2008 CA_{174}	—	August 9, 2005	Cerro Tololo	Deep Ecliptic Survey	·	2.0 km	MPC · JPL
776683	2008 CM_{198}	—	February 12, 2008	Kitt Peak	Spacewatch	·	2.2 km	MPC · JPL
776684	2008 CP_{203}	—	February 11, 2008	Mount Lemmon	Mount Lemmon Survey	·	2.3 km	MPC · JPL
776685	2008 CD_{206}	—	February 7, 2008	Kitt Peak	Spacewatch	EUN	890 m	MPC · JPL
776686	2008 CV_{212}	—	February 9, 2008	Kitt Peak	Spacewatch	URS	2.3 km	MPC · JPL
776687	2008 CF_{219}	—	February 2, 2008	Mount Lemmon	Mount Lemmon Survey	·	1.2 km	MPC · JPL
776688	2008 CG_{224}	—	May 18, 2015	Mount Lemmon	Mount Lemmon Survey	·	2.3 km	MPC · JPL
776689	2008 CO_{224}	—	September 30, 2011	Mount Lemmon	Mount Lemmon Survey	·	1.1 km	MPC · JPL
776690	2008 CB_{225}	—	September 3, 2014	Mount Lemmon	Mount Lemmon Survey	·	1.2 km	MPC · JPL
776691	2008 CH_{225}	—	October 29, 2017	Haleakala	Pan-STARRS 1	EMA	2.0 km	MPC · JPL
776692	2008 CE_{226}	—	June 12, 2013	Haleakala	Pan-STARRS 1	·	1.1 km	MPC · JPL
776693	2008 CN_{226}	—	February 10, 2008	Kitt Peak	Spacewatch	THB	1.8 km	MPC · JPL
776694	2008 CQ_{226}	—	February 10, 2008	Kitt Peak	Spacewatch	·	1.0 km	MPC · JPL
776695	2008 CR_{226}	—	March 28, 2015	Haleakala	Pan-STARRS 1	VER	2.1 km	MPC · JPL
776696	2008 CB_{227}	—	February 7, 2008	Kitt Peak	Spacewatch	·	1.0 km	MPC · JPL
776697	2008 CU_{227}	—	July 29, 2014	Haleakala	Pan-STARRS 1	HNS	690 m	MPC · JPL
776698	2008 CC_{230}	—	January 26, 2017	Haleakala	Pan-STARRS 1	·	1.4 km	MPC · JPL
776699	2008 CY_{230}	—	December 29, 2011	Mount Lemmon	Mount Lemmon Survey	·	1.1 km	MPC · JPL
776700	2008 CG_{231}	—	February 10, 2008	Kitt Peak	Spacewatch	HNS	770 m	MPC · JPL

== 776701–776800 ==
back to top

Designation			Discovery			Properties		Ref
Permanent	Provisional	Named after	Date	Site	Discoverer(s)	Category	Diam.	Ref
776701	2008 CS_{231}	—	February 9, 2008	Mount Lemmon	Mount Lemmon Survey	·	2.5 km	MPC · JPL
776702	2008 CE_{232}	—	February 1, 2008	Mount Lemmon	Mount Lemmon Survey	·	2.0 km	MPC · JPL
776703	2008 CH_{232}	—	May 15, 2013	Haleakala	Pan-STARRS 1	·	990 m	MPC · JPL
776704	2008 CS_{232}	—	February 2, 2008	Mount Lemmon	Mount Lemmon Survey	(7605)	2.7 km	MPC · JPL
776705	2008 CT_{232}	—	February 7, 2008	Mount Lemmon	Mount Lemmon Survey	·	2.6 km	MPC · JPL
776706	2008 CN_{233}	—	February 10, 2008	Mount Lemmon	Mount Lemmon Survey	·	2.9 km	MPC · JPL
776707	2008 CS_{233}	—	October 10, 2015	Haleakala	Pan-STARRS 1	·	1.4 km	MPC · JPL
776708	2008 CF_{234}	—	February 10, 2008	Kitt Peak	Spacewatch	·	1.6 km	MPC · JPL
776709	2008 CS_{234}	—	April 23, 2015	Haleakala	Pan-STARRS 1	·	2.0 km	MPC · JPL
776710	2008 CT_{234}	—	February 13, 2008	Kitt Peak	Spacewatch	·	2.0 km	MPC · JPL
776711	2008 CU_{234}	—	February 12, 2008	Mount Lemmon	Mount Lemmon Survey	·	2.2 km	MPC · JPL
776712	2008 CC_{235}	—	February 3, 2008	Mount Lemmon	Mount Lemmon Survey	·	2.0 km	MPC · JPL
776713	2008 CK_{235}	—	February 3, 2008	Mount Lemmon	Mount Lemmon Survey	EUP	2.3 km	MPC · JPL
776714	2008 CL_{235}	—	November 10, 2016	Haleakala	Pan-STARRS 1	HNS	1.0 km	MPC · JPL
776715	2008 CR_{235}	—	September 4, 2011	Haleakala	Pan-STARRS 1	VER	1.9 km	MPC · JPL
776716	2008 CP_{236}	—	January 31, 2017	Mount Lemmon	Mount Lemmon Survey	·	1.3 km	MPC · JPL
776717	2008 CF_{237}	—	February 4, 2017	Haleakala	Pan-STARRS 1	·	1.2 km	MPC · JPL
776718	2008 CT_{237}	—	September 18, 2011	Mount Lemmon	Mount Lemmon Survey	·	2.1 km	MPC · JPL
776719	2008 CG_{239}	—	February 10, 2008	Kitt Peak	Spacewatch	·	2.0 km	MPC · JPL
776720	2008 CU_{239}	—	February 9, 2008	Kitt Peak	Spacewatch	·	2.8 km	MPC · JPL
776721	2008 CB_{240}	—	February 11, 2008	Mount Lemmon	Mount Lemmon Survey	·	2.3 km	MPC · JPL
776722	2008 CQ_{241}	—	February 11, 2008	Kitt Peak	Spacewatch	THM	1.5 km	MPC · JPL
776723	2008 CT_{241}	—	February 9, 2008	Kitt Peak	Spacewatch	·	2.3 km	MPC · JPL
776724	2008 CV_{241}	—	February 2, 2008	Mount Lemmon	Mount Lemmon Survey	·	1.3 km	MPC · JPL
776725	2008 CG_{242}	—	February 12, 2008	Mount Lemmon	Mount Lemmon Survey	·	1.7 km	MPC · JPL
776726	2008 CL_{243}	—	February 2, 2008	Kitt Peak	Spacewatch	THB	2.1 km	MPC · JPL
776727	2008 CV_{243}	—	February 13, 2008	Kitt Peak	Spacewatch	EUN	710 m	MPC · JPL
776728	2008 CX_{243}	—	February 10, 2008	Mount Lemmon	Mount Lemmon Survey	·	970 m	MPC · JPL
776729	2008 CK_{244}	—	February 10, 2008	Mount Lemmon	Mount Lemmon Survey	·	970 m	MPC · JPL
776730	2008 CO_{244}	—	February 8, 2008	Kitt Peak	Spacewatch	·	1 km	MPC · JPL
776731	2008 CH_{245}	—	September 1, 2005	Kitt Peak	Spacewatch	·	1.2 km	MPC · JPL
776732	2008 CJ_{245}	—	February 9, 2008	Kitt Peak	Spacewatch	·	1.1 km	MPC · JPL
776733	2008 CF_{246}	—	February 12, 2008	Kitt Peak	Spacewatch	·	2.4 km	MPC · JPL
776734	2008 CQ_{246}	—	February 3, 2008	Mount Lemmon	Mount Lemmon Survey	EOS	1.5 km	MPC · JPL
776735	2008 CO_{247}	—	February 8, 2008	Mount Lemmon	Mount Lemmon Survey	·	1.0 km	MPC · JPL
776736	2008 CE_{248}	—	February 9, 2008	Mount Lemmon	Mount Lemmon Survey	·	1.0 km	MPC · JPL
776737	2008 CQ_{249}	—	February 7, 2008	Kitt Peak	Spacewatch	·	2.2 km	MPC · JPL
776738	2008 CG_{250}	—	February 10, 2008	Kitt Peak	Spacewatch	·	1.9 km	MPC · JPL
776739	2008 CP_{250}	—	February 8, 2008	Kitt Peak	Spacewatch	EOS	1.4 km	MPC · JPL
776740	2008 CE_{251}	—	February 10, 2008	Kitt Peak	Spacewatch	·	1.9 km	MPC · JPL
776741	2008 CY_{251}	—	February 8, 2008	Kitt Peak	Spacewatch	THM	1.6 km	MPC · JPL
776742	2008 DT_{1}	—	January 11, 2008	Mount Lemmon	Mount Lemmon Survey	·	2.1 km	MPC · JPL
776743	2008 DN_{6}	—	February 3, 2008	Mount Lemmon	Mount Lemmon Survey	THB	2.2 km	MPC · JPL
776744	2008 DX_{12}	—	January 30, 2008	Mount Lemmon	Mount Lemmon Survey	·	2.1 km	MPC · JPL
776745	2008 DA_{14}	—	February 26, 2008	Mount Lemmon	Mount Lemmon Survey	·	2.3 km	MPC · JPL
776746	2008 DM_{37}	—	February 27, 2008	Kitt Peak	Spacewatch	·	1.3 km	MPC · JPL
776747	2008 DU_{41}	—	February 28, 2008	Kitt Peak	Spacewatch	·	950 m	MPC · JPL
776748	2008 DX_{59}	—	February 27, 2008	Kitt Peak	Spacewatch	·	2.4 km	MPC · JPL
776749	2008 DE_{63}	—	October 19, 2006	Kitt Peak	Deep Ecliptic Survey	·	1.1 km	MPC · JPL
776750	2008 DM_{63}	—	February 9, 2008	Kitt Peak	Spacewatch	·	1.4 km	MPC · JPL
776751	2008 DR_{64}	—	February 13, 2008	Kitt Peak	Spacewatch	·	1.1 km	MPC · JPL
776752	2008 DW_{65}	—	February 28, 2008	Mount Lemmon	Mount Lemmon Survey	·	1.5 km	MPC · JPL
776753	2008 DJ_{68}	—	January 30, 2008	Kitt Peak	Spacewatch	·	1.7 km	MPC · JPL
776754	2008 DU_{74}	—	February 28, 2008	Mount Lemmon	Mount Lemmon Survey	·	940 m	MPC · JPL
776755	2008 DU_{77}	—	February 28, 2008	Mount Lemmon	Mount Lemmon Survey	·	1.1 km	MPC · JPL
776756	2008 DD_{81}	—	February 27, 2008	Mount Lemmon	Mount Lemmon Survey	TIR	1.7 km	MPC · JPL
776757	2008 DN_{87}	—	February 28, 2008	Mount Lemmon	Mount Lemmon Survey	·	990 m	MPC · JPL
776758	2008 DQ_{91}	—	February 28, 2008	Mount Lemmon	Mount Lemmon Survey	·	1.5 km	MPC · JPL
776759	2008 DU_{93}	—	February 26, 2008	Mount Lemmon	Mount Lemmon Survey	THB	2.0 km	MPC · JPL
776760	2008 DY_{93}	—	January 25, 2012	Haleakala	Pan-STARRS 1	·	1.3 km	MPC · JPL
776761	2008 DL_{94}	—	February 5, 2016	Haleakala	Pan-STARRS 1	3:2	4.2 km	MPC · JPL
776762	2008 DV_{94}	—	April 24, 2014	Mount Lemmon	Mount Lemmon Survey	HYG	2.0 km	MPC · JPL
776763	2008 DY_{94}	—	February 28, 2008	Mount Lemmon	Mount Lemmon Survey	THM	1.7 km	MPC · JPL
776764	2008 DV_{96}	—	February 28, 2008	Kitt Peak	Spacewatch	HYG	2.0 km	MPC · JPL
776765	2008 DZ_{97}	—	February 26, 2008	Mount Lemmon	Mount Lemmon Survey	·	910 m	MPC · JPL
776766	2008 DD_{98}	—	February 28, 2008	Kitt Peak	Spacewatch	·	2.3 km	MPC · JPL
776767	2008 DM_{98}	—	February 28, 2008	Mount Lemmon	Mount Lemmon Survey	·	2.6 km	MPC · JPL
776768	2008 DD_{99}	—	February 28, 2008	Mount Lemmon	Mount Lemmon Survey	·	2.6 km	MPC · JPL
776769	2008 DY_{99}	—	February 28, 2008	Mount Lemmon	Mount Lemmon Survey	·	2.2 km	MPC · JPL
776770	2008 DM_{100}	—	February 26, 2008	Mount Lemmon	Mount Lemmon Survey	·	1.6 km	MPC · JPL
776771	2008 EF_{2}	—	March 1, 2008	Mount Lemmon	Mount Lemmon Survey	·	2.6 km	MPC · JPL
776772	2008 ER_{2}	—	March 1, 2008	Mount Lemmon	Mount Lemmon Survey	·	2.8 km	MPC · JPL
776773	2008 EJ_{11}	—	March 1, 2008	Kitt Peak	Spacewatch	·	1.2 km	MPC · JPL
776774	2008 EK_{17}	—	March 1, 2008	Kitt Peak	Spacewatch	·	1.6 km	MPC · JPL
776775	2008 EE_{22}	—	March 2, 2008	Mount Lemmon	Mount Lemmon Survey	·	1.6 km	MPC · JPL
776776	2008 EU_{23}	—	March 3, 2008	Mount Lemmon	Mount Lemmon Survey	·	2.2 km	MPC · JPL
776777	2008 EA_{28}	—	March 4, 2008	Mount Lemmon	Mount Lemmon Survey	·	1.6 km	MPC · JPL
776778	2008 EQ_{30}	—	March 5, 2008	Mount Lemmon	Mount Lemmon Survey	·	1.0 km	MPC · JPL
776779	2008 EX_{30}	—	February 12, 2008	Mount Lemmon	Mount Lemmon Survey	·	2.5 km	MPC · JPL
776780	2008 EQ_{31}	—	March 5, 2008	Mount Lemmon	Mount Lemmon Survey	·	1.3 km	MPC · JPL
776781	2008 EE_{36}	—	March 3, 2008	Kitt Peak	Spacewatch	·	3.3 km	MPC · JPL
776782	2008 EY_{43}	—	February 24, 2008	Kitt Peak	Spacewatch	·	1.6 km	MPC · JPL
776783	2008 EQ_{48}	—	January 12, 2008	Kitt Peak	Spacewatch	·	910 m	MPC · JPL
776784	2008 EL_{56}	—	February 10, 2008	Kitt Peak	Spacewatch	·	1.2 km	MPC · JPL
776785	2008 EH_{58}	—	February 24, 2008	Mount Lemmon	Mount Lemmon Survey	EUN	720 m	MPC · JPL
776786	2008 EZ_{61}	—	March 9, 2008	Mount Lemmon	Mount Lemmon Survey	·	1.6 km	MPC · JPL
776787	2008 EB_{64}	—	March 9, 2008	Mount Lemmon	Mount Lemmon Survey	ADE	1.5 km	MPC · JPL
776788	2008 EC_{64}	—	February 12, 2008	Mount Lemmon	Mount Lemmon Survey	·	1.1 km	MPC · JPL
776789	2008 EM_{64}	—	March 1, 2008	Kitt Peak	Spacewatch	·	2.0 km	MPC · JPL
776790	2008 EY_{65}	—	February 2, 2008	Kitt Peak	Spacewatch	·	2.7 km	MPC · JPL
776791	2008 ET_{72}	—	March 6, 2008	Mount Lemmon	Mount Lemmon Survey	·	2.4 km	MPC · JPL
776792	2008 EU_{77}	—	March 7, 2008	Kitt Peak	Spacewatch	EUP	2.8 km	MPC · JPL
776793	2008 ER_{101}	—	March 5, 2008	Mount Lemmon	Mount Lemmon Survey	HYG	2.0 km	MPC · JPL
776794	2008 ES_{105}	—	March 6, 2008	Mount Lemmon	Mount Lemmon Survey	·	1.2 km	MPC · JPL
776795	2008 EJ_{114}	—	March 8, 2008	Kitt Peak	Spacewatch	·	1.3 km	MPC · JPL
776796	2008 ET_{115}	—	March 1, 2008	Kitt Peak	Spacewatch	·	1.3 km	MPC · JPL
776797	2008 EX_{119}	—	February 2, 2008	Mount Lemmon	Mount Lemmon Survey	·	1.2 km	MPC · JPL
776798	2008 EA_{126}	—	March 10, 2008	Kitt Peak	Spacewatch	·	1.1 km	MPC · JPL
776799	2008 EG_{129}	—	March 11, 2008	Kitt Peak	Spacewatch	·	1.9 km	MPC · JPL
776800	2008 EJ_{131}	—	March 11, 2008	Kitt Peak	Spacewatch	EOS	1.5 km	MPC · JPL

== 776801–776900 ==
back to top

Designation			Discovery			Properties		Ref
Permanent	Provisional	Named after	Date	Site	Discoverer(s)	Category	Diam.	Ref
776801	2008 EN_{134}	—	March 11, 2008	Mount Lemmon	Mount Lemmon Survey	·	1.2 km	MPC · JPL
776802	2008 EO_{137}	—	March 11, 2008	Kitt Peak	Spacewatch	·	1.2 km	MPC · JPL
776803	2008 EA_{138}	—	December 17, 2007	Mount Lemmon	Mount Lemmon Survey	·	1.3 km	MPC · JPL
776804	2008 ER_{152}	—	March 10, 2008	Kitt Peak	Spacewatch	·	1.1 km	MPC · JPL
776805	2008 EV_{157}	—	March 4, 2008	Mount Lemmon	Mount Lemmon Survey	BAR	1.0 km	MPC · JPL
776806	2008 EC_{158}	—	March 2, 2008	Kitt Peak	Spacewatch	·	2.5 km	MPC · JPL
776807	2008 EU_{159}	—	January 26, 2012	Mount Lemmon	Mount Lemmon Survey	·	700 m	MPC · JPL
776808	2008 EJ_{160}	—	March 1, 2008	Kitt Peak	Spacewatch	EUN	890 m	MPC · JPL
776809	2008 EU_{160}	—	March 1, 2008	Mount Lemmon	Mount Lemmon Survey	THB	2.1 km	MPC · JPL
776810	2008 EG_{174}	—	September 26, 2011	Haleakala	Pan-STARRS 1	URS	2.4 km	MPC · JPL
776811	2008 ET_{176}	—	March 1, 2008	Kitt Peak	Spacewatch	·	2.6 km	MPC · JPL
776812	2008 EP_{178}	—	December 26, 2011	Mount Lemmon	Mount Lemmon Survey	(5)	1.2 km	MPC · JPL
776813	2008 EA_{180}	—	January 19, 2012	Haleakala	Pan-STARRS 1	·	1.1 km	MPC · JPL
776814	2008 EG_{183}	—	February 26, 2014	Haleakala	Pan-STARRS 1	·	2.1 km	MPC · JPL
776815	2008 ET_{184}	—	February 26, 2014	Mount Lemmon	Mount Lemmon Survey	·	2.2 km	MPC · JPL
776816	2008 EC_{185}	—	March 13, 2008	Kitt Peak	Spacewatch	·	1.1 km	MPC · JPL
776817	2008 ER_{185}	—	November 1, 2015	Haleakala	Pan-STARRS 1	HOF	1.9 km	MPC · JPL
776818	2008 EX_{188}	—	December 23, 2012	Haleakala	Pan-STARRS 1	·	2.4 km	MPC · JPL
776819	2008 EE_{189}	—	November 24, 2011	Mount Lemmon	Mount Lemmon Survey	EOS	1.3 km	MPC · JPL
776820	2008 EG_{189}	—	March 24, 2014	Haleakala	Pan-STARRS 1	·	2.0 km	MPC · JPL
776821	2008 EN_{189}	—	January 17, 2016	Haleakala	Pan-STARRS 1	·	860 m	MPC · JPL
776822	2008 EO_{189}	—	July 8, 2014	Haleakala	Pan-STARRS 1	WIT	680 m	MPC · JPL
776823	2008 EK_{192}	—	March 13, 2008	Kitt Peak	Spacewatch	·	1.2 km	MPC · JPL
776824	2008 EG_{193}	—	March 8, 2008	Mount Lemmon	Mount Lemmon Survey	MIS	1.7 km	MPC · JPL
776825	2008 EA_{194}	—	March 13, 2008	Mount Lemmon	Mount Lemmon Survey	·	840 m	MPC · JPL
776826	2008 EB_{194}	—	March 11, 2008	Kitt Peak	Spacewatch	·	1.2 km	MPC · JPL
776827	2008 EC_{194}	—	March 15, 2008	Kitt Peak	Spacewatch	·	1.2 km	MPC · JPL
776828	2008 EH_{194}	—	March 1, 2008	Kitt Peak	Spacewatch	EUN	710 m	MPC · JPL
776829	2008 EL_{196}	—	March 11, 2008	Mount Lemmon	Mount Lemmon Survey	·	2.3 km	MPC · JPL
776830	2008 EU_{196}	—	March 10, 2008	Kitt Peak	Spacewatch	·	1.5 km	MPC · JPL
776831	2008 EE_{198}	—	March 11, 2008	Mount Lemmon	Mount Lemmon Survey	·	2.1 km	MPC · JPL
776832	2008 EN_{198}	—	March 5, 2008	Kitt Peak	Spacewatch	THM	1.6 km	MPC · JPL
776833	2008 EA_{199}	—	March 6, 2008	Mount Lemmon	Mount Lemmon Survey	·	1.8 km	MPC · JPL
776834	2008 EK_{199}	—	March 10, 2008	Kitt Peak	Spacewatch	·	1.7 km	MPC · JPL
776835	2008 EQ_{199}	—	March 8, 2008	Mount Lemmon	Mount Lemmon Survey	·	1.4 km	MPC · JPL
776836	2008 FJ_{1}	—	March 12, 2008	Kitt Peak	Spacewatch	·	2.6 km	MPC · JPL
776837	2008 FH_{3}	—	February 13, 2008	Mount Lemmon	Mount Lemmon Survey	(1547)	1.3 km	MPC · JPL
776838	2008 FP_{13}	—	March 26, 2008	Mount Lemmon	Mount Lemmon Survey	·	1.2 km	MPC · JPL
776839	2008 FW_{16}	—	February 8, 2008	Kitt Peak	Spacewatch	·	1.2 km	MPC · JPL
776840	2008 FP_{17}	—	February 28, 2008	Mount Lemmon	Mount Lemmon Survey	·	2.6 km	MPC · JPL
776841	2008 FM_{18}	—	February 13, 2008	Kitt Peak	Spacewatch	KOR	1.1 km	MPC · JPL
776842	2008 FB_{19}	—	February 27, 2008	Mount Lemmon	Mount Lemmon Survey	·	1.8 km	MPC · JPL
776843	2008 FZ_{29}	—	March 5, 2008	Mount Lemmon	Mount Lemmon Survey	·	2.2 km	MPC · JPL
776844	2008 FW_{32}	—	March 28, 2008	Mount Lemmon	Mount Lemmon Survey	·	2.2 km	MPC · JPL
776845	2008 FN_{35}	—	February 28, 2008	Mount Lemmon	Mount Lemmon Survey	·	1.0 km	MPC · JPL
776846	2008 FW_{35}	—	March 7, 2008	Kitt Peak	Spacewatch	·	1.0 km	MPC · JPL
776847	2008 FU_{42}	—	February 28, 2008	Kitt Peak	Spacewatch	·	2.7 km	MPC · JPL
776848	2008 FV_{43}	—	March 28, 2008	Mount Lemmon	Mount Lemmon Survey	AGN	950 m	MPC · JPL
776849	2008 FV_{44}	—	February 3, 2008	Kitt Peak	Spacewatch	·	1.3 km	MPC · JPL
776850	2008 FU_{46}	—	February 28, 2008	Mount Lemmon	Mount Lemmon Survey	·	890 m	MPC · JPL
776851	2008 FL_{47}	—	March 5, 2008	Kitt Peak	Spacewatch	·	1.2 km	MPC · JPL
776852	2008 FP_{61}	—	March 30, 2008	Catalina	CSS	·	1.2 km	MPC · JPL
776853	2008 FF_{65}	—	March 28, 2008	Kitt Peak	Spacewatch	·	2.6 km	MPC · JPL
776854	2008 FU_{67}	—	March 28, 2008	Kitt Peak	Spacewatch	·	1.3 km	MPC · JPL
776855	2008 FJ_{75}	—	March 31, 2008	Mount Lemmon	Mount Lemmon Survey	·	1.2 km	MPC · JPL
776856	2008 FV_{81}	—	March 27, 2008	Mount Lemmon	Mount Lemmon Survey	·	1.5 km	MPC · JPL
776857	2008 FN_{83}	—	March 28, 2008	Kitt Peak	Spacewatch	·	3.1 km	MPC · JPL
776858	2008 FM_{95}	—	March 29, 2008	Mount Lemmon	Mount Lemmon Survey	EOS	1.3 km	MPC · JPL
776859	2008 FM_{97}	—	March 1, 2008	Kitt Peak	Spacewatch	·	1.3 km	MPC · JPL
776860	2008 FS_{97}	—	March 30, 2008	Kitt Peak	Spacewatch	AGN	850 m	MPC · JPL
776861	2008 FQ_{98}	—	March 30, 2008	Kitt Peak	Spacewatch	·	960 m	MPC · JPL
776862	2008 FL_{100}	—	March 30, 2008	Kitt Peak	Spacewatch	·	1.3 km	MPC · JPL
776863	2008 FN_{106}	—	March 31, 2008	Kitt Peak	Spacewatch	·	1.2 km	MPC · JPL
776864	2008 FY_{108}	—	March 31, 2008	Mount Lemmon	Mount Lemmon Survey	·	1.4 km	MPC · JPL
776865	2008 FC_{109}	—	March 31, 2008	Mount Lemmon	Mount Lemmon Survey	HOF	1.9 km	MPC · JPL
776866	2008 FG_{118}	—	March 31, 2008	Mount Lemmon	Mount Lemmon Survey	·	1.3 km	MPC · JPL
776867	2008 FL_{121}	—	March 31, 2008	Mount Lemmon	Mount Lemmon Survey	VER	1.9 km	MPC · JPL
776868	2008 FS_{125}	—	March 31, 2008	Mount Lemmon	Mount Lemmon Survey	LIX	2.5 km	MPC · JPL
776869	2008 FN_{139}	—	March 31, 2008	Mount Lemmon	Mount Lemmon Survey	·	2.6 km	MPC · JPL
776870	2008 FX_{139}	—	March 28, 2008	Kitt Peak	Spacewatch	·	2.4 km	MPC · JPL
776871	2008 FX_{141}	—	March 30, 2008	Kitt Peak	Spacewatch	·	1.2 km	MPC · JPL
776872	2008 FA_{144}	—	March 31, 2008	Kitt Peak	Spacewatch	·	1.4 km	MPC · JPL
776873	2008 FC_{144}	—	March 31, 2008	Mount Lemmon	Mount Lemmon Survey	·	2.1 km	MPC · JPL
776874	2008 FG_{144}	—	March 30, 2008	Kitt Peak	Spacewatch	TIR	2.3 km	MPC · JPL
776875	2008 FE_{145}	—	March 11, 2008	Kitt Peak	Spacewatch	·	1.3 km	MPC · JPL
776876	2008 FT_{146}	—	March 26, 2008	Mount Lemmon	Mount Lemmon Survey	·	2.2 km	MPC · JPL
776877	2008 FP_{147}	—	March 27, 2008	Mount Lemmon	Mount Lemmon Survey	·	970 m	MPC · JPL
776878	2008 FR_{147}	—	March 31, 2008	Mount Lemmon	Mount Lemmon Survey	·	1.1 km	MPC · JPL
776879	2008 FX_{147}	—	March 31, 2008	Mount Lemmon	Mount Lemmon Survey	·	890 m	MPC · JPL
776880	2008 FF_{148}	—	March 27, 2008	Mount Lemmon	Mount Lemmon Survey	·	1.1 km	MPC · JPL
776881	2008 FT_{148}	—	March 27, 2008	Mount Lemmon	Mount Lemmon Survey	·	2.4 km	MPC · JPL
776882	2008 FD_{149}	—	March 28, 2008	Mount Lemmon	Mount Lemmon Survey	·	2.1 km	MPC · JPL
776883	2008 FE_{149}	—	March 31, 2008	Mount Lemmon	Mount Lemmon Survey	·	2.4 km	MPC · JPL
776884	2008 FY_{149}	—	March 28, 2008	Kitt Peak	Spacewatch	HNS	710 m	MPC · JPL
776885	2008 FZ_{149}	—	March 31, 2008	Kitt Peak	Spacewatch	EUN	780 m	MPC · JPL
776886	2008 FK_{150}	—	March 26, 2008	Mount Lemmon	Mount Lemmon Survey	·	1.0 km	MPC · JPL
776887	2008 GQ_{2}	—	April 5, 2008	Mount Lemmon	Mount Lemmon Survey	·	1.8 km	MPC · JPL
776888	2008 GP_{14}	—	April 3, 2008	Kitt Peak	Spacewatch	·	1.4 km	MPC · JPL
776889	2008 GZ_{14}	—	April 3, 2008	Mount Lemmon	Mount Lemmon Survey	·	1.2 km	MPC · JPL
776890	2008 GD_{24}	—	April 1, 2008	Mount Lemmon	Mount Lemmon Survey	·	1.0 km	MPC · JPL
776891	2008 GR_{25}	—	April 1, 2008	Mount Lemmon	Mount Lemmon Survey	·	2.0 km	MPC · JPL
776892	2008 GL_{32}	—	April 3, 2008	Kitt Peak	Spacewatch	·	1.3 km	MPC · JPL
776893	2008 GC_{33}	—	April 3, 2008	Mount Lemmon	Mount Lemmon Survey	·	800 m	MPC · JPL
776894	2008 GB_{46}	—	April 4, 2008	Kitt Peak	Spacewatch	·	1.3 km	MPC · JPL
776895	2008 GT_{57}	—	April 5, 2008	Mount Lemmon	Mount Lemmon Survey	·	1.1 km	MPC · JPL
776896	2008 GY_{58}	—	April 5, 2008	Mount Lemmon	Mount Lemmon Survey	·	1.4 km	MPC · JPL
776897	2008 GJ_{59}	—	April 5, 2008	Mount Lemmon	Mount Lemmon Survey	·	2.1 km	MPC · JPL
776898	2008 GS_{61}	—	April 5, 2008	Mount Lemmon	Mount Lemmon Survey	·	1.4 km	MPC · JPL
776899	2008 GC_{62}	—	April 5, 2008	Mount Lemmon	Mount Lemmon Survey	·	1.2 km	MPC · JPL
776900	2008 GM_{65}	—	March 28, 2008	Mount Lemmon	Mount Lemmon Survey	·	1.3 km	MPC · JPL

== 776901–777000 ==
back to top

Designation			Discovery			Properties		Ref
Permanent	Provisional	Named after	Date	Site	Discoverer(s)	Category	Diam.	Ref
776901	2008 GD_{73}	—	March 12, 2008	Kitt Peak	Spacewatch	·	2.9 km	MPC · JPL
776902	2008 GP_{74}	—	March 30, 2008	Kitt Peak	Spacewatch	T_{j} (2.99)	2.9 km	MPC · JPL
776903	2008 GH_{76}	—	April 7, 2008	Mount Lemmon	Mount Lemmon Survey	·	550 m	MPC · JPL
776904	2008 GK_{76}	—	April 5, 2008	Mount Lemmon	Mount Lemmon Survey	·	990 m	MPC · JPL
776905	2008 GO_{78}	—	April 7, 2008	Kitt Peak	Spacewatch	DOR	1.8 km	MPC · JPL
776906	2008 GT_{83}	—	April 8, 2008	Mount Lemmon	Mount Lemmon Survey	EUN	940 m	MPC · JPL
776907	2008 GX_{85}	—	March 27, 2008	Mount Lemmon	Mount Lemmon Survey	EOS	1.2 km	MPC · JPL
776908	2008 GY_{86}	—	March 10, 2008	Mount Lemmon	Mount Lemmon Survey	·	910 m	MPC · JPL
776909	2008 GC_{91}	—	April 6, 2008	Mount Lemmon	Mount Lemmon Survey	·	910 m	MPC · JPL
776910	2008 GN_{99}	—	April 9, 2008	Kitt Peak	Spacewatch	·	980 m	MPC · JPL
776911	2008 GG_{106}	—	April 11, 2008	Mount Lemmon	Mount Lemmon Survey	·	1.0 km	MPC · JPL
776912	2008 GD_{111}	—	March 11, 2008	Catalina	CSS	T_{j} (2.95)	3.1 km	MPC · JPL
776913	2008 GD_{116}	—	April 11, 2008	Mount Lemmon	Mount Lemmon Survey	·	1.1 km	MPC · JPL
776914	2008 GJ_{137}	—	April 5, 2008	Mount Lemmon	Mount Lemmon Survey	·	1.3 km	MPC · JPL
776915	2008 GG_{141}	—	December 23, 2017	Haleakala	Pan-STARRS 1	·	2.0 km	MPC · JPL
776916	2008 GL_{150}	—	April 13, 2008	Mount Lemmon	Mount Lemmon Survey	T_{j} (2.97)	2.9 km	MPC · JPL
776917	2008 GQ_{152}	—	December 22, 2012	Haleakala	Pan-STARRS 1	·	1.7 km	MPC · JPL
776918	2008 GJ_{154}	—	February 8, 2013	Haleakala	Pan-STARRS 1	·	2.3 km	MPC · JPL
776919	2008 GQ_{154}	—	August 15, 2009	Kitt Peak	Spacewatch	·	1.1 km	MPC · JPL
776920	2008 GG_{156}	—	August 20, 2014	Haleakala	Pan-STARRS 1	·	1.4 km	MPC · JPL
776921	2008 GQ_{156}	—	April 1, 2008	Kitt Peak	Spacewatch	·	1.3 km	MPC · JPL
776922	2008 GK_{157}	—	September 16, 2010	Kitt Peak	Spacewatch	·	1.5 km	MPC · JPL
776923	2008 GE_{158}	—	April 3, 2008	Catalina	CSS	T_{j} (2.9)	2.1 km	MPC · JPL
776924	2008 GL_{161}	—	April 3, 2008	Mount Lemmon	Mount Lemmon Survey	·	2.0 km	MPC · JPL
776925	2008 GD_{162}	—	October 30, 2014	Mount Lemmon	Mount Lemmon Survey	EUN	980 m	MPC · JPL
776926	2008 GX_{162}	—	April 14, 2008	Kitt Peak	Spacewatch	·	1.1 km	MPC · JPL
776927	2008 GL_{165}	—	August 28, 2014	Haleakala	Pan-STARRS 1	AGN	870 m	MPC · JPL
776928	2008 GT_{165}	—	March 4, 2017	Haleakala	Pan-STARRS 1	·	1.3 km	MPC · JPL
776929	2008 GD_{166}	—	August 27, 2014	Haleakala	Pan-STARRS 1	AGN	860 m	MPC · JPL
776930	2008 GN_{166}	—	October 28, 2017	Haleakala	Pan-STARRS 1	·	2.2 km	MPC · JPL
776931	2008 GT_{166}	—	January 4, 2016	Haleakala	Pan-STARRS 1	EUN	780 m	MPC · JPL
776932	2008 GV_{166}	—	April 14, 2008	Mount Lemmon	Mount Lemmon Survey	·	1.2 km	MPC · JPL
776933	2008 GA_{169}	—	April 6, 2008	Mount Lemmon	Mount Lemmon Survey	L5	6.4 km	MPC · JPL
776934	2008 GD_{169}	—	April 3, 2008	Kitt Peak	Spacewatch	L5	7.1 km	MPC · JPL
776935	2008 GV_{171}	—	April 3, 2008	Kitt Peak	Spacewatch	·	1.0 km	MPC · JPL
776936	2008 GA_{172}	—	April 7, 2008	Kitt Peak	Spacewatch	·	1.2 km	MPC · JPL
776937	2008 GH_{173}	—	April 3, 2008	Kitt Peak	Spacewatch	·	2.2 km	MPC · JPL
776938	2008 GA_{174}	—	April 9, 2008	Kitt Peak	Spacewatch	·	1.4 km	MPC · JPL
776939	2008 GC_{174}	—	April 6, 2008	Kitt Peak	Spacewatch	·	1.9 km	MPC · JPL
776940	2008 GG_{174}	—	April 3, 2008	Mount Lemmon	Mount Lemmon Survey	KON	1.7 km	MPC · JPL
776941	2008 GT_{175}	—	April 3, 2008	Mount Lemmon	Mount Lemmon Survey	·	1.3 km	MPC · JPL
776942	2008 GF_{178}	—	April 5, 2008	Mount Lemmon	Mount Lemmon Survey	ELF	2.7 km	MPC · JPL
776943	2008 HZ_{13}	—	April 11, 2008	Mount Lemmon	Mount Lemmon Survey	MRX	800 m	MPC · JPL
776944	2008 HQ_{20}	—	April 14, 2008	Kitt Peak	Spacewatch	EUN	780 m	MPC · JPL
776945	2008 HY_{23}	—	April 27, 2008	Kitt Peak	Spacewatch	EUN	800 m	MPC · JPL
776946	2008 HZ_{23}	—	April 27, 2008	Kitt Peak	Spacewatch	·	2.5 km	MPC · JPL
776947	2008 HM_{28}	—	April 28, 2008	Kitt Peak	Spacewatch	·	1.5 km	MPC · JPL
776948	2008 HN_{30}	—	April 29, 2008	Mount Lemmon	Mount Lemmon Survey	·	1.0 km	MPC · JPL
776949	2008 HV_{32}	—	April 29, 2008	Mount Lemmon	Mount Lemmon Survey	·	2.3 km	MPC · JPL
776950	2008 HG_{33}	—	April 29, 2008	Mount Lemmon	Mount Lemmon Survey	·	1.3 km	MPC · JPL
776951	2008 HL_{35}	—	April 1, 2008	Mount Lemmon	Mount Lemmon Survey	·	1.9 km	MPC · JPL
776952	2008 HY_{47}	—	March 4, 2008	Mount Lemmon	Mount Lemmon Survey	·	1.3 km	MPC · JPL
776953	2008 HP_{48}	—	April 29, 2008	Kitt Peak	Spacewatch	EUN	1.1 km	MPC · JPL
776954	2008 HU_{52}	—	April 11, 2008	Kitt Peak	Spacewatch	·	1.2 km	MPC · JPL
776955	2008 HS_{53}	—	April 29, 2008	Kitt Peak	Spacewatch	·	1.5 km	MPC · JPL
776956	2008 HP_{66}	—	March 15, 2008	Dauban	C. Rinner, F. Kugel	·	1.6 km	MPC · JPL
776957	2008 HX_{66}	—	April 26, 2008	Kitt Peak	Spacewatch	·	2.5 km	MPC · JPL
776958	2008 HJ_{68}	—	April 30, 2008	Kitt Peak	Spacewatch	·	2.3 km	MPC · JPL
776959	2008 HK_{73}	—	November 1, 2010	Mount Lemmon	Mount Lemmon Survey	·	1.6 km	MPC · JPL
776960	2008 HC_{75}	—	February 20, 2012	Haleakala	Pan-STARRS 1	·	970 m	MPC · JPL
776961	2008 HE_{75}	—	April 24, 2008	Mount Lemmon	Mount Lemmon Survey	·	1.2 km	MPC · JPL
776962	2008 HD_{77}	—	April 27, 2008	Mount Lemmon	Mount Lemmon Survey	·	2.7 km	MPC · JPL
776963	2008 HT_{77}	—	April 25, 2008	Mount Lemmon	Mount Lemmon Survey	·	1.3 km	MPC · JPL
776964	2008 HD_{78}	—	April 28, 2008	Kitt Peak	Spacewatch	·	1.4 km	MPC · JPL
776965	2008 HE_{78}	—	April 30, 2008	Mount Lemmon	Mount Lemmon Survey	EUN	900 m	MPC · JPL
776966	2008 HQ_{78}	—	April 26, 2008	Mount Lemmon	Mount Lemmon Survey	TIR	2.2 km	MPC · JPL
776967	2008 HE_{79}	—	April 30, 2008	Kitt Peak	Spacewatch	EUN	880 m	MPC · JPL
776968	2008 JJ_{3}	—	May 2, 2008	Kitt Peak	Spacewatch	·	1.2 km	MPC · JPL
776969	2008 JG_{11}	—	May 3, 2008	Kitt Peak	Spacewatch	·	990 m	MPC · JPL
776970	2008 JN_{16}	—	May 3, 2008	Mount Lemmon	Mount Lemmon Survey	·	1.4 km	MPC · JPL
776971	2008 JD_{17}	—	May 3, 2008	Mount Lemmon	Mount Lemmon Survey	AGN	930 m	MPC · JPL
776972	2008 JS_{22}	—	May 7, 2008	Kitt Peak	Spacewatch	(1547)	1.2 km	MPC · JPL
776973	2008 JA_{40}	—	April 1, 2008	Kitt Peak	Spacewatch	·	2.4 km	MPC · JPL
776974	2008 JY_{43}	—	November 24, 2017	Mount Lemmon	Mount Lemmon Survey	·	2.0 km	MPC · JPL
776975	2008 JL_{44}	—	October 28, 2014	Haleakala	Pan-STARRS 1	·	1.5 km	MPC · JPL
776976	2008 JT_{44}	—	May 3, 2008	Mount Lemmon	Mount Lemmon Survey	·	1.2 km	MPC · JPL
776977	2008 JZ_{44}	—	May 10, 2014	Haleakala	Pan-STARRS 1	·	2.7 km	MPC · JPL
776978	2008 JK_{48}	—	May 5, 2008	Mount Lemmon	Mount Lemmon Survey	·	1.3 km	MPC · JPL
776979	2008 JC_{49}	—	March 27, 2017	Haleakala	Pan-STARRS 1	·	1.3 km	MPC · JPL
776980	2008 JL_{49}	—	May 15, 2008	Mount Lemmon	Mount Lemmon Survey	·	3.2 km	MPC · JPL
776981	2008 JP_{49}	—	February 28, 2012	Haleakala	Pan-STARRS 1	·	1.2 km	MPC · JPL
776982	2008 JD_{51}	—	May 10, 2008	Mount Lemmon	Mount Lemmon Survey	·	2.6 km	MPC · JPL
776983	2008 JY_{51}	—	May 3, 2008	Mount Lemmon	Mount Lemmon Survey	·	1.1 km	MPC · JPL
776984	2008 JA_{52}	—	May 12, 2008	Siding Spring	SSS	·	1.6 km	MPC · JPL
776985	2008 JF_{52}	—	May 3, 2008	Mount Lemmon	Mount Lemmon Survey	(1547)	1.2 km	MPC · JPL
776986	2008 JK_{52}	—	May 7, 2008	Kitt Peak	Spacewatch	·	1.2 km	MPC · JPL
776987	2008 JQ_{52}	—	May 14, 2008	Kitt Peak	Spacewatch	·	1.7 km	MPC · JPL
776988	2008 JR_{53}	—	May 7, 2008	Kitt Peak	Spacewatch	·	1.5 km	MPC · JPL
776989	2008 JJ_{54}	—	May 7, 2008	Mount Lemmon	Mount Lemmon Survey	·	1.5 km	MPC · JPL
776990	2008 JQ_{55}	—	May 7, 2008	Mount Lemmon	Mount Lemmon Survey	·	1.6 km	MPC · JPL
776991	2008 KW_{7}	—	May 27, 2008	Kitt Peak	Spacewatch	·	2.0 km	MPC · JPL
776992	2008 KS_{13}	—	May 27, 2008	Kitt Peak	Spacewatch	·	1.2 km	MPC · JPL
776993	2008 KC_{16}	—	May 27, 2008	Kitt Peak	Spacewatch	·	1.2 km	MPC · JPL
776994	2008 KA_{23}	—	May 28, 2008	Mount Lemmon	Mount Lemmon Survey	·	2.4 km	MPC · JPL
776995	2008 KQ_{26}	—	May 29, 2008	Kitt Peak	Spacewatch	·	1.1 km	MPC · JPL
776996	2008 KV_{44}	—	February 5, 2016	Haleakala	Pan-STARRS 1	·	1.8 km	MPC · JPL
776997	2008 KD_{47}	—	May 14, 2008	Mount Lemmon	Mount Lemmon Survey	·	1.7 km	MPC · JPL
776998	2008 KK_{47}	—	January 4, 2017	Haleakala	Pan-STARRS 1	L5	6.9 km	MPC · JPL
776999	2008 KG_{48}	—	September 18, 2014	Haleakala	Pan-STARRS 1	·	1.5 km	MPC · JPL
777000	2008 KY_{48}	—	May 26, 2008	Vail-Jarnac	Jarnac	JUN	1.0 km	MPC · JPL

back to top

== Meaning of names ==
As minor planet discoveries are confirmed, they are given a permanent number by the IAU's Minor Planet Center (MPC), and the discoverers can then submit names for them, following the IAU's naming conventions. The list below concerns those minor planets in the specified number-range that have received names, and explains the meanings of those names.

Official naming citations of newly named small Solar System bodies are approved and published in a bulletin by IAU's Working Group for Small Bodies Nomenclature (WGSBN). Before May 2021, citations were published in MPC's Minor Planet Circulars for many decades. Recent citations can also be found on the JPL Small-Body Database (SBDB). Until his death in 2016, German astronomer Lutz D. Schmadel compiled these citations into the Dictionary of Minor Planet Names (DMP) and regularly updated the collection.

Based on Paul Herget's The Names of the Minor Planets, Schmadel also researched the unclear origin of numerous asteroids, most of which had been named prior to World War II. This article incorporates text from this source, which is in the public domain: SBDB New namings may only be added to this list below after official publication as the preannouncement of names is condemned. The WGSBN publishes a comprehensive guideline for the naming rules of non-cometary small Solar System bodies.

Named minor planet	Provisional	This minor planet was named for...	Ref · Catalog
776645 Michaelkarrer	2008 CP_{69}	Michael Karrer, Austrian adult education teacher and amateur astronomer.	IAU · 776645
776675 Jędrzejewicz	2008 CN_{164}	Jan Jędrzejewicz, Polish physician and astronomer.	IAU · 776675
