= List of minor planets: 768001–769000 =

The following is a partial list of minor planets, running from minor-planet number 768001 through 769000, inclusive. The primary data for this and other partial lists is based on JPL's "Small-Body Orbital Elements" and data available from the Minor Planet Center. Critical list information is also provided by the MPC, unless otherwise specified from Lowell Observatory. A detailed description of the table's columns and additional sources are given on the main page including a complete list of every page in this series, and a statistical break-up on the dynamical classification of minor planets.

Also see the summary list of all named bodies in numerical and alphabetical order, and the corresponding naming citations for the number range of this particular list. New namings may only be added to this list after official publication, as the preannouncement of names is condemned by the Working Group for Small Bodies Nomenclature of the International Astronomical Union.

Near-Earth obj.	MBA (inner)	MBA (outer)	Centaur
Mars-crosser	MBA (middle)	Jupiter trojan	Trans-Neptunian obj.
Unclassified

== 768001–768100 ==
Designation			Discovery			Properties		Ref
Permanent	Provisional	Named after	Date	Site	Discoverer(s)	Category	Diam.	Ref
768001	2015 AP_{247}	—	January 13, 2015	Haleakala	Pan-STARRS 1	KOR	980 m	MPC · JPL
768002	2015 AW_{247}	—	November 23, 2014	Mount Lemmon	Mount Lemmon Survey	PHO	770 m	MPC · JPL
768003	2015 AB_{249}	—	January 13, 2015	Haleakala	Pan-STARRS 1	EOS	1.4 km	MPC · JPL
768004	2015 AG_{249}	—	December 21, 2014	Haleakala	Pan-STARRS 1	·	1.9 km	MPC · JPL
768005	2015 AP_{249}	—	September 14, 2013	Haleakala	Pan-STARRS 1	·	2.3 km	MPC · JPL
768006	2015 AF_{255}	—	November 27, 2014	Haleakala	Pan-STARRS 1	·	1.5 km	MPC · JPL
768007	2015 AL_{258}	—	January 15, 2015	Mount Lemmon	Mount Lemmon Survey	EOS	1.4 km	MPC · JPL
768008	2015 AY_{259}	—	October 2, 2013	Kitt Peak	Spacewatch	L5	7.5 km	MPC · JPL
768009	2015 AQ_{260}	—	January 15, 2015	Haleakala	Pan-STARRS 1	·	1.3 km	MPC · JPL
768010	2015 AC_{261}	—	November 9, 2013	Mount Lemmon	Mount Lemmon Survey	·	1.9 km	MPC · JPL
768011	2015 AE_{262}	—	October 25, 2013	Mount Lemmon	Mount Lemmon Survey	·	2.0 km	MPC · JPL
768012	2015 AF_{274}	—	November 9, 2013	Haleakala	Pan-STARRS 1	·	2.4 km	MPC · JPL
768013	2015 AA_{275}	—	January 14, 2015	Haleakala	Pan-STARRS 1	·	2.1 km	MPC · JPL
768014	2015 AY_{277}	—	January 15, 2015	Haleakala	Pan-STARRS 1	·	2.4 km	MPC · JPL
768015	2015 AH_{285}	—	October 25, 2013	Mount Lemmon	Mount Lemmon Survey	·	2.4 km	MPC · JPL
768016	2015 AO_{286}	—	January 15, 2015	Haleakala	Pan-STARRS 1	·	2.3 km	MPC · JPL
768017	2015 AE_{290}	—	December 21, 2014	Haleakala	Pan-STARRS 1	·	2.3 km	MPC · JPL
768018	2015 AY_{291}	—	October 9, 2004	Kitt Peak	Spacewatch	·	630 m	MPC · JPL
768019	2015 AK_{295}	—	January 15, 2015	Haleakala	Pan-STARRS 1	·	2.2 km	MPC · JPL
768020	2015 AJ_{296}	—	August 27, 2013	Haleakala	Pan-STARRS 1	·	2.1 km	MPC · JPL
768021	2015 AW_{298}	—	January 14, 2015	Haleakala	Pan-STARRS 1	·	2.0 km	MPC · JPL
768022	2015 AH_{300}	—	January 15, 2015	Haleakala	Pan-STARRS 1	·	2.0 km	MPC · JPL
768023	2015 AR_{301}	—	January 14, 2015	Haleakala	Pan-STARRS 1	·	2.6 km	MPC · JPL
768024	2015 AM_{302}	—	January 15, 2015	Haleakala	Pan-STARRS 1	·	2.1 km	MPC · JPL
768025	2015 AW_{302}	—	January 15, 2015	Haleakala	Pan-STARRS 1	·	2.4 km	MPC · JPL
768026	2015 AD_{303}	—	January 14, 2015	Haleakala	Pan-STARRS 1	·	1.5 km	MPC · JPL
768027	2015 AW_{303}	—	January 13, 2015	Haleakala	Pan-STARRS 1	·	1.8 km	MPC · JPL
768028	2015 AR_{304}	—	January 14, 2015	Haleakala	Pan-STARRS 1	EOS	1.4 km	MPC · JPL
768029	2015 AS_{305}	—	January 13, 2015	Haleakala	Pan-STARRS 1	·	2.2 km	MPC · JPL
768030	2015 AV_{306}	—	January 14, 2015	Haleakala	Pan-STARRS 1	EOS	1.4 km	MPC · JPL
768031	2015 BA_{2}	—	October 19, 2006	Kitt Peak	Deep Ecliptic Survey	·	910 m	MPC · JPL
768032	2015 BU_{2}	—	October 30, 2013	Haleakala	Pan-STARRS 1	·	2.2 km	MPC · JPL
768033	2015 BQ_{7}	—	July 13, 2013	Haleakala	Pan-STARRS 1	·	540 m	MPC · JPL
768034	2015 BN_{8}	—	December 21, 2014	Haleakala	Pan-STARRS 1	·	1.6 km	MPC · JPL
768035	2015 BY_{8}	—	February 7, 2008	Mount Lemmon	Mount Lemmon Survey	·	550 m	MPC · JPL
768036	2015 BZ_{9}	—	December 29, 2014	Haleakala	Pan-STARRS 1	·	2.0 km	MPC · JPL
768037	2015 BM_{13}	—	December 26, 2014	Haleakala	Pan-STARRS 1	·	2.2 km	MPC · JPL
768038	2015 BS_{14}	—	December 26, 2014	Haleakala	Pan-STARRS 1	·	480 m	MPC · JPL
768039	2015 BD_{23}	—	January 15, 2015	Haleakala	Pan-STARRS 1	·	1.8 km	MPC · JPL
768040	2015 BP_{23}	—	November 27, 2014	Haleakala	Pan-STARRS 1	·	2.1 km	MPC · JPL
768041	2015 BN_{25}	—	November 29, 2014	Haleakala	Pan-STARRS 1	·	2.2 km	MPC · JPL
768042	2015 BR_{30}	—	January 16, 2015	Haleakala	Pan-STARRS 1	·	1.9 km	MPC · JPL
768043	2015 BS_{33}	—	January 16, 2015	Haleakala	Pan-STARRS 1	·	1.7 km	MPC · JPL
768044	2015 BD_{38}	—	December 29, 2014	Haleakala	Pan-STARRS 1	·	760 m	MPC · JPL
768045	2015 BP_{40}	—	January 17, 2015	Mount Lemmon	Mount Lemmon Survey	·	1.5 km	MPC · JPL
768046	2015 BS_{41}	—	October 30, 2008	Mount Lemmon	Mount Lemmon Survey	·	1.8 km	MPC · JPL
768047	2015 BA_{43}	—	November 26, 2014	Haleakala	Pan-STARRS 1	·	460 m	MPC · JPL
768048	2015 BP_{43}	—	December 29, 2014	Haleakala	Pan-STARRS 1	·	1.7 km	MPC · JPL
768049	2015 BD_{48}	—	December 29, 2014	Haleakala	Pan-STARRS 1	·	440 m	MPC · JPL
768050	2015 BU_{48}	—	September 29, 2005	Kitt Peak	Spacewatch	·	1.1 km	MPC · JPL
768051	2015 BW_{49}	—	December 24, 2014	Mount Lemmon	Mount Lemmon Survey	·	530 m	MPC · JPL
768052	2015 BE_{51}	—	January 17, 2015	Haleakala	Pan-STARRS 1	·	1.8 km	MPC · JPL
768053	2015 BE_{54}	—	April 25, 2008	Mount Lemmon	Mount Lemmon Survey	·	1.0 km	MPC · JPL
768054	2015 BG_{57}	—	January 17, 2015	Haleakala	Pan-STARRS 1	·	1.8 km	MPC · JPL
768055	2015 BP_{57}	—	February 10, 2010	Kitt Peak	Spacewatch	·	2.2 km	MPC · JPL
768056	2015 BB_{61}	—	January 19, 2004	Kitt Peak	Spacewatch	·	2.1 km	MPC · JPL
768057	2015 BA_{62}	—	January 17, 2015	Haleakala	Pan-STARRS 1	·	1.9 km	MPC · JPL
768058	2015 BE_{63}	—	January 17, 2015	Haleakala	Pan-STARRS 1	EOS	1.3 km	MPC · JPL
768059	2015 BB_{65}	—	January 8, 2007	Mount Lemmon	Mount Lemmon Survey	·	980 m	MPC · JPL
768060	2015 BU_{65}	—	January 17, 2015	Haleakala	Pan-STARRS 1	·	490 m	MPC · JPL
768061	2015 BL_{68}	—	September 9, 2008	Mount Lemmon	Mount Lemmon Survey	·	2.1 km	MPC · JPL
768062	2015 BE_{71}	—	October 2, 2013	Kitt Peak	Spacewatch	·	2.7 km	MPC · JPL
768063	2015 BB_{73}	—	January 17, 2015	Haleakala	Pan-STARRS 1	·	1.3 km	MPC · JPL
768064	2015 BR_{76}	—	January 17, 2015	Haleakala	Pan-STARRS 1	EOS	1.2 km	MPC · JPL
768065	2015 BK_{78}	—	January 18, 2015	Kitt Peak	Spacewatch	·	470 m	MPC · JPL
768066	2015 BT_{81}	—	November 2, 2008	Mount Lemmon	Mount Lemmon Survey	·	2.3 km	MPC · JPL
768067	2015 BD_{82}	—	November 4, 2013	Kitt Peak	Spacewatch	·	2.5 km	MPC · JPL
768068	2015 BV_{87}	—	January 18, 2015	Haleakala	Pan-STARRS 1	·	470 m	MPC · JPL
768069	2015 BC_{90}	—	December 2, 2014	Haleakala	Pan-STARRS 1	·	2.6 km	MPC · JPL
768070	2015 BH_{90}	—	January 16, 2015	Haleakala	Pan-STARRS 1	·	490 m	MPC · JPL
768071	2015 BP_{90}	—	February 9, 1999	Kitt Peak	Spacewatch	·	2.0 km	MPC · JPL
768072	2015 BH_{95}	—	October 1, 2013	Mount Lemmon	Mount Lemmon Survey	·	1.7 km	MPC · JPL
768073	2015 BL_{96}	—	October 18, 2014	Mount Lemmon	Mount Lemmon Survey	·	2.2 km	MPC · JPL
768074	2015 BZ_{97}	—	December 29, 2014	Haleakala	Pan-STARRS 1	EOS	1.5 km	MPC · JPL
768075	2015 BJ_{98}	—	December 26, 2014	Haleakala	Pan-STARRS 1	·	2.4 km	MPC · JPL
768076	2015 BN_{99}	—	October 29, 2000	Kitt Peak	Spacewatch	·	450 m	MPC · JPL
768077	2015 BW_{99}	—	December 18, 2014	Haleakala	Pan-STARRS 1	·	2.0 km	MPC · JPL
768078	2015 BF_{103}	—	January 16, 2015	Haleakala	Pan-STARRS 1	·	520 m	MPC · JPL
768079	2015 BM_{108}	—	January 17, 2015	Mount Lemmon	Mount Lemmon Survey	EOS	1.4 km	MPC · JPL
768080	2015 BS_{109}	—	January 17, 2015	Mount Lemmon	Mount Lemmon Survey	·	2.5 km	MPC · JPL
768081	2015 BH_{110}	—	November 9, 2013	Catalina	CSS	·	2.6 km	MPC · JPL
768082	2015 BL_{111}	—	January 17, 2015	Mount Lemmon	Mount Lemmon Survey	·	2.3 km	MPC · JPL
768083	2015 BM_{111}	—	November 26, 2014	Haleakala	Pan-STARRS 1	EOS	1.3 km	MPC · JPL
768084	2015 BL_{112}	—	January 17, 2015	Mount Lemmon	Mount Lemmon Survey	VER	2.0 km	MPC · JPL
768085	2015 BK_{114}	—	January 17, 2015	Mount Lemmon	Mount Lemmon Survey	EOS	1.6 km	MPC · JPL
768086	2015 BJ_{121}	—	December 29, 2008	Kitt Peak	Spacewatch	·	2.5 km	MPC · JPL
768087	2015 BG_{124}	—	January 17, 2015	Haleakala	Pan-STARRS 1	·	2.4 km	MPC · JPL
768088	2015 BO_{124}	—	September 7, 2008	Mount Lemmon	Mount Lemmon Survey	NEM	1.9 km	MPC · JPL
768089	2015 BL_{128}	—	January 17, 2015	Haleakala	Pan-STARRS 1	·	2.4 km	MPC · JPL
768090	2015 BL_{129}	—	September 10, 2010	Kitt Peak	Spacewatch	·	480 m	MPC · JPL
768091	2015 BY_{130}	—	January 17, 2015	Haleakala	Pan-STARRS 1	·	1.1 km	MPC · JPL
768092	2015 BL_{131}	—	January 17, 2015	Haleakala	Pan-STARRS 1	·	1.6 km	MPC · JPL
768093	2015 BS_{132}	—	January 17, 2015	Haleakala	Pan-STARRS 1	·	590 m	MPC · JPL
768094	2015 BB_{133}	—	January 17, 2015	Haleakala	Pan-STARRS 1	·	2.5 km	MPC · JPL
768095	2015 BX_{133}	—	January 17, 2015	Haleakala	Pan-STARRS 1	EOS	1.5 km	MPC · JPL
768096	2015 BY_{135}	—	May 29, 2009	Kitt Peak	Spacewatch	·	630 m	MPC · JPL
768097	2015 BJ_{138}	—	October 6, 2008	Mount Lemmon	Mount Lemmon Survey	·	1.1 km	MPC · JPL
768098	2015 BT_{139}	—	January 17, 2015	Haleakala	Pan-STARRS 1	·	2.4 km	MPC · JPL
768099	2015 BX_{141}	—	December 22, 2008	Kitt Peak	Spacewatch	VER	1.8 km	MPC · JPL
768100	2015 BM_{142}	—	October 24, 2013	Mount Lemmon	Mount Lemmon Survey	·	1.9 km	MPC · JPL

== 768101–768200 ==
back to top

Designation			Discovery			Properties		Ref
Permanent	Provisional	Named after	Date	Site	Discoverer(s)	Category	Diam.	Ref
768101	2015 BA_{143}	—	December 29, 2008	Kitt Peak	Spacewatch	·	2.3 km	MPC · JPL
768102	2015 BF_{144}	—	January 17, 2015	Haleakala	Pan-STARRS 1	·	2.4 km	MPC · JPL
768103	2015 BZ_{145}	—	January 17, 2015	Haleakala	Pan-STARRS 1	·	2.3 km	MPC · JPL
768104	2015 BL_{146}	—	December 31, 2008	Kitt Peak	Spacewatch	HYG	2.0 km	MPC · JPL
768105	2015 BW_{146}	—	August 12, 2012	Catalina	CSS	TIR	2.5 km	MPC · JPL
768106	2015 BR_{147}	—	August 12, 2007	Bergisch Gladbach	W. Bickel	THM	1.9 km	MPC · JPL
768107	2015 BR_{149}	—	January 17, 2015	Haleakala	Pan-STARRS 1	KOR	1.0 km	MPC · JPL
768108	2015 BD_{150}	—	October 1, 2008	Kitt Peak	Spacewatch	·	1.2 km	MPC · JPL
768109	2015 BP_{150}	—	December 11, 2009	Mount Lemmon	Mount Lemmon Survey	·	1.2 km	MPC · JPL
768110	2015 BF_{155}	—	January 19, 2004	Kitt Peak	Spacewatch	·	2.0 km	MPC · JPL
768111	2015 BY_{155}	—	December 18, 2014	Haleakala	Pan-STARRS 1	·	1.4 km	MPC · JPL
768112	2015 BH_{157}	—	October 12, 2013	Kitt Peak	Spacewatch	·	1.9 km	MPC · JPL
768113	2015 BB_{160}	—	January 17, 2015	Haleakala	Pan-STARRS 1	·	2.3 km	MPC · JPL
768114	2015 BS_{160}	—	January 15, 2015	Haleakala	Pan-STARRS 1	·	520 m	MPC · JPL
768115	2015 BN_{161}	—	April 19, 2012	Mount Lemmon	Mount Lemmon Survey	·	520 m	MPC · JPL
768116	2015 BS_{163}	—	October 23, 2013	Mount Lemmon	Mount Lemmon Survey	·	1.2 km	MPC · JPL
768117	2015 BF_{165}	—	October 9, 2012	Haleakala	Pan-STARRS 1	·	2.3 km	MPC · JPL
768118	2015 BT_{166}	—	January 17, 2015	Haleakala	Pan-STARRS 1	·	1.3 km	MPC · JPL
768119	2015 BV_{167}	—	October 5, 2013	Mount Lemmon	Mount Lemmon Survey	·	1.8 km	MPC · JPL
768120	2015 BH_{168}	—	October 7, 2013	Kitt Peak	Spacewatch	·	2.1 km	MPC · JPL
768121	2015 BC_{170}	—	July 14, 2013	Haleakala	Pan-STARRS 1	V	400 m	MPC · JPL
768122	2015 BT_{171}	—	January 17, 2015	Haleakala	Pan-STARRS 1	·	2.4 km	MPC · JPL
768123	2015 BN_{172}	—	November 10, 2013	Kitt Peak	Spacewatch	·	1.4 km	MPC · JPL
768124	2015 BP_{172}	—	December 14, 2010	Mount Lemmon	Mount Lemmon Survey	·	860 m	MPC · JPL
768125	2015 BU_{174}	—	September 3, 2013	Calar Alto	F. Hormuth	·	1.2 km	MPC · JPL
768126	2015 BH_{178}	—	January 17, 2015	Haleakala	Pan-STARRS 1	·	420 m	MPC · JPL
768127	2015 BP_{179}	—	January 17, 2015	Haleakala	Pan-STARRS 1	·	2.5 km	MPC · JPL
768128	2015 BX_{180}	—	January 17, 2015	Haleakala	Pan-STARRS 1	·	2.0 km	MPC · JPL
768129	2015 BC_{181}	—	January 17, 2015	Haleakala	Pan-STARRS 1	EOS	1.4 km	MPC · JPL
768130	2015 BQ_{181}	—	January 17, 2015	Haleakala	Pan-STARRS 1	·	2.3 km	MPC · JPL
768131	2015 BA_{182}	—	September 11, 2010	Siding Spring	SSS	·	530 m	MPC · JPL
768132	2015 BL_{182}	—	May 27, 2011	Kitt Peak	Spacewatch	·	2.3 km	MPC · JPL
768133	2015 BC_{183}	—	October 24, 2013	Mount Lemmon	Mount Lemmon Survey	·	1.6 km	MPC · JPL
768134	2015 BG_{185}	—	January 17, 2015	Haleakala	Pan-STARRS 1	·	670 m	MPC · JPL
768135	2015 BT_{186}	—	January 17, 2015	Haleakala	Pan-STARRS 1	·	2.2 km	MPC · JPL
768136	2015 BW_{187}	—	October 25, 2013	Mount Lemmon	Mount Lemmon Survey	·	1.3 km	MPC · JPL
768137	2015 BG_{188}	—	January 17, 2015	Haleakala	Pan-STARRS 1	·	1.5 km	MPC · JPL
768138	2015 BK_{192}	—	October 26, 2013	Mount Lemmon	Mount Lemmon Survey	·	2.1 km	MPC · JPL
768139	2015 BT_{194}	—	October 3, 2013	Haleakala	Pan-STARRS 1	CLA	1.2 km	MPC · JPL
768140	2015 BN_{195}	—	November 11, 2013	Mount Lemmon	Mount Lemmon Survey	·	1.8 km	MPC · JPL
768141	2015 BJ_{196}	—	January 17, 2015	Haleakala	Pan-STARRS 1	VER	1.9 km	MPC · JPL
768142	2015 BO_{199}	—	September 13, 2007	Catalina	CSS	·	2.1 km	MPC · JPL
768143	2015 BL_{205}	—	January 18, 2015	Kitt Peak	Spacewatch	·	500 m	MPC · JPL
768144	2015 BO_{208}	—	December 23, 2014	Mount Lemmon	Mount Lemmon Survey	·	530 m	MPC · JPL
768145	2015 BV_{208}	—	December 27, 2014	Mount Lemmon	Mount Lemmon Survey	·	570 m	MPC · JPL
768146	2015 BP_{212}	—	October 4, 2013	Mount Lemmon	Mount Lemmon Survey	VER	2.0 km	MPC · JPL
768147	2015 BD_{215}	—	January 18, 2015	Haleakala	Pan-STARRS 1	·	2.5 km	MPC · JPL
768148	2015 BN_{215}	—	January 18, 2015	Haleakala	Pan-STARRS 1	·	500 m	MPC · JPL
768149	2015 BB_{216}	—	January 18, 2015	Mount Lemmon	Mount Lemmon Survey	·	2.2 km	MPC · JPL
768150	2015 BZ_{218}	—	November 9, 2007	Mount Lemmon	Mount Lemmon Survey	·	470 m	MPC · JPL
768151	2015 BX_{219}	—	January 18, 2015	Haleakala	Pan-STARRS 1	·	1.8 km	MPC · JPL
768152	2015 BX_{226}	—	November 20, 2014	Mount Lemmon	Mount Lemmon Survey	·	2.5 km	MPC · JPL
768153	2015 BB_{227}	—	January 18, 2015	Mount Lemmon	Mount Lemmon Survey	·	2.2 km	MPC · JPL
768154	2015 BF_{227}	—	May 1, 2011	Haleakala	Pan-STARRS 1	EOS	1.7 km	MPC · JPL
768155	2015 BV_{227}	—	December 29, 2014	Haleakala	Pan-STARRS 1	·	520 m	MPC · JPL
768156	2015 BN_{228}	—	December 29, 2014	Haleakala	Pan-STARRS 1	EOS	1.3 km	MPC · JPL
768157	2015 BV_{230}	—	December 21, 2014	Haleakala	Pan-STARRS 1	·	2.1 km	MPC · JPL
768158	2015 BM_{231}	—	December 29, 2014	Haleakala	Pan-STARRS 1	·	1.9 km	MPC · JPL
768159	2015 BF_{235}	—	December 16, 2007	Mount Lemmon	Mount Lemmon Survey	·	440 m	MPC · JPL
768160	2015 BJ_{235}	—	October 30, 2007	Mount Lemmon	Mount Lemmon Survey	·	440 m	MPC · JPL
768161	2015 BK_{237}	—	December 29, 2014	Haleakala	Pan-STARRS 1	V	390 m	MPC · JPL
768162	2015 BF_{238}	—	January 18, 2015	Mount Lemmon	Mount Lemmon Survey	·	2.2 km	MPC · JPL
768163	2015 BM_{238}	—	March 28, 2012	Mount Lemmon	Mount Lemmon Survey	(2076)	450 m	MPC · JPL
768164	2015 BO_{238}	—	January 18, 2015	Mount Lemmon	Mount Lemmon Survey	EOS	1.6 km	MPC · JPL
768165	2015 BL_{240}	—	November 26, 2014	Haleakala	Pan-STARRS 1	VER	2.6 km	MPC · JPL
768166	2015 BL_{242}	—	January 18, 2015	Haleakala	Pan-STARRS 1	EOS	1.3 km	MPC · JPL
768167	2015 BV_{244}	—	January 2, 2009	Kitt Peak	Spacewatch	·	2.2 km	MPC · JPL
768168	2015 BE_{246}	—	January 18, 2015	Haleakala	Pan-STARRS 1	·	2.4 km	MPC · JPL
768169	2015 BZ_{246}	—	March 10, 2008	Kitt Peak	Spacewatch	·	760 m	MPC · JPL
768170	2015 BW_{250}	—	April 7, 2010	Kitt Peak	Spacewatch	·	2.1 km	MPC · JPL
768171	2015 BF_{251}	—	September 14, 2013	Haleakala	Pan-STARRS 1	·	1.4 km	MPC · JPL
768172	2015 BG_{251}	—	January 18, 2015	Haleakala	Pan-STARRS 1	EOS	1.3 km	MPC · JPL
768173	2015 BU_{251}	—	January 15, 2008	Kitt Peak	Spacewatch	·	540 m	MPC · JPL
768174	2015 BP_{253}	—	January 18, 2015	Haleakala	Pan-STARRS 1	EOS	1.4 km	MPC · JPL
768175	2015 BM_{254}	—	January 18, 2015	Haleakala	Pan-STARRS 1	·	590 m	MPC · JPL
768176	2015 BQ_{255}	—	January 18, 2015	Haleakala	Pan-STARRS 1	·	2.3 km	MPC · JPL
768177	2015 BL_{256}	—	December 18, 2014	Haleakala	Pan-STARRS 1	·	1.8 km	MPC · JPL
768178	2015 BW_{257}	—	January 18, 2015	Haleakala	Pan-STARRS 1	EOS	1.4 km	MPC · JPL
768179	2015 BH_{261}	—	January 18, 2015	Haleakala	Pan-STARRS 1	·	2.1 km	MPC · JPL
768180	2015 BP_{263}	—	January 18, 2015	Haleakala	Pan-STARRS 1	·	2.9 km	MPC · JPL
768181	2015 BH_{278}	—	November 30, 2014	Haleakala	Pan-STARRS 1	·	2.2 km	MPC · JPL
768182	2015 BY_{281}	—	March 15, 2010	Mount Lemmon	Mount Lemmon Survey	·	2.3 km	MPC · JPL
768183	2015 BC_{283}	—	April 28, 2012	Kitt Peak	Spacewatch	·	540 m	MPC · JPL
768184	2015 BQ_{283}	—	January 19, 2015	Haleakala	Pan-STARRS 1	V	400 m	MPC · JPL
768185	2015 BW_{283}	—	November 8, 2013	Mount Lemmon	Mount Lemmon Survey	·	1.6 km	MPC · JPL
768186	2015 BX_{283}	—	November 1, 2008	Kitt Peak	Spacewatch	·	1.5 km	MPC · JPL
768187	2015 BD_{284}	—	October 12, 2007	Kitt Peak	Spacewatch	VER	2.1 km	MPC · JPL
768188	2015 BW_{284}	—	January 19, 2015	Haleakala	Pan-STARRS 1	·	2.4 km	MPC · JPL
768189	2015 BX_{284}	—	January 19, 2015	Haleakala	Pan-STARRS 1	·	2.1 km	MPC · JPL
768190	2015 BE_{285}	—	March 29, 2012	Mount Lemmon	Mount Lemmon Survey	·	450 m	MPC · JPL
768191	2015 BX_{285}	—	March 13, 2010	Mount Lemmon	Mount Lemmon Survey	·	2.4 km	MPC · JPL
768192	2015 BC_{286}	—	November 1, 2013	Mount Lemmon	Mount Lemmon Survey	·	1.5 km	MPC · JPL
768193	2015 BM_{287}	—	January 19, 2015	Haleakala	Pan-STARRS 1	·	2.3 km	MPC · JPL
768194	2015 BE_{290}	—	January 19, 2015	Haleakala	Pan-STARRS 1	·	2.2 km	MPC · JPL
768195	2015 BQ_{290}	—	October 2, 2013	Haleakala	Pan-STARRS 1	EOS	1.5 km	MPC · JPL
768196	2015 BR_{290}	—	January 19, 2015	Haleakala	Pan-STARRS 1	·	2.3 km	MPC · JPL
768197	2015 BX_{290}	—	January 19, 2015	Haleakala	Pan-STARRS 1	·	1.4 km	MPC · JPL
768198	2015 BB_{293}	—	November 9, 2013	Mount Lemmon	Mount Lemmon Survey	·	2.5 km	MPC · JPL
768199	2015 BW_{293}	—	October 26, 2013	Mount Lemmon	Mount Lemmon Survey	·	2.3 km	MPC · JPL
768200	2015 BR_{295}	—	January 19, 2015	Haleakala	Pan-STARRS 1	·	2.2 km	MPC · JPL

== 768201–768300 ==
back to top

Designation			Discovery			Properties		Ref
Permanent	Provisional	Named after	Date	Site	Discoverer(s)	Category	Diam.	Ref
768201	2015 BL_{297}	—	November 17, 2006	Mount Lemmon	Mount Lemmon Survey	·	940 m	MPC · JPL
768202	2015 BA_{300}	—	January 19, 2015	Haleakala	Pan-STARRS 1	·	700 m	MPC · JPL
768203	2015 BZ_{304}	—	February 18, 2008	Mount Lemmon	Mount Lemmon Survey	(2076)	750 m	MPC · JPL
768204	2015 BG_{309}	—	September 9, 2007	Mount Lemmon	Mount Lemmon Survey	EOS	1.5 km	MPC · JPL
768205	2015 BL_{310}	—	July 29, 2008	Mount Lemmon	Mount Lemmon Survey	WIT	670 m	MPC · JPL
768206	2015 BB_{316}	—	October 26, 2013	Mount Lemmon	Mount Lemmon Survey	·	1.7 km	MPC · JPL
768207	2015 BS_{316}	—	September 1, 2013	Catalina	CSS	·	610 m	MPC · JPL
768208	2015 BS_{317}	—	September 28, 2013	Mount Lemmon	Mount Lemmon Survey	·	590 m	MPC · JPL
768209	2015 BB_{318}	—	November 9, 2013	Mount Lemmon	Mount Lemmon Survey	·	1.8 km	MPC · JPL
768210	2015 BB_{320}	—	October 3, 2013	Mount Lemmon	Mount Lemmon Survey	·	2.1 km	MPC · JPL
768211	2015 BQ_{323}	—	January 17, 2015	Haleakala	Pan-STARRS 1	·	2.1 km	MPC · JPL
768212	2015 BE_{325}	—	February 4, 2005	Mount Lemmon	Mount Lemmon Survey	·	520 m	MPC · JPL
768213	2015 BM_{325}	—	January 17, 2015	Haleakala	Pan-STARRS 1	·	580 m	MPC · JPL
768214	2015 BQ_{325}	—	January 17, 2015	Haleakala	Pan-STARRS 1	THM	1.8 km	MPC · JPL
768215	2015 BB_{329}	—	October 17, 2010	Mount Lemmon	Mount Lemmon Survey	·	450 m	MPC · JPL
768216	2015 BH_{329}	—	October 13, 2013	Mount Lemmon	Mount Lemmon Survey	·	1.1 km	MPC · JPL
768217	2015 BC_{330}	—	December 2, 2008	Mount Lemmon	Mount Lemmon Survey	EOS	1.5 km	MPC · JPL
768218	2015 BR_{334}	—	July 14, 2013	Haleakala	Pan-STARRS 1	·	500 m	MPC · JPL
768219	2015 BX_{335}	—	January 17, 2015	Haleakala	Pan-STARRS 1	·	2.0 km	MPC · JPL
768220	2015 BJ_{337}	—	January 17, 2015	Haleakala	Pan-STARRS 1	·	1.0 km	MPC · JPL
768221	2015 BM_{337}	—	October 15, 2004	Mount Lemmon	Mount Lemmon Survey	AGN	850 m	MPC · JPL
768222	2015 BR_{337}	—	November 27, 2013	Haleakala	Pan-STARRS 1	EOS	1.5 km	MPC · JPL
768223	2015 BR_{338}	—	January 17, 2015	Haleakala	Pan-STARRS 1	·	690 m	MPC · JPL
768224	2015 BT_{341}	—	October 24, 2013	Haleakala	Pan-STARRS 1	·	2.2 km	MPC · JPL
768225	2015 BH_{342}	—	March 28, 2012	Kitt Peak	Spacewatch	·	570 m	MPC · JPL
768226	2015 BT_{342}	—	March 28, 2012	Kitt Peak	Spacewatch	·	570 m	MPC · JPL
768227	2015 BD_{345}	—	December 26, 2014	Haleakala	Pan-STARRS 1	·	1.6 km	MPC · JPL
768228	2015 BC_{346}	—	January 23, 2011	Mount Lemmon	Mount Lemmon Survey	·	1.1 km	MPC · JPL
768229	2015 BA_{347}	—	July 13, 2013	Haleakala	Pan-STARRS 1	·	500 m	MPC · JPL
768230	2015 BQ_{347}	—	October 7, 2008	Mount Lemmon	Mount Lemmon Survey	·	1.9 km	MPC · JPL
768231	2015 BC_{348}	—	December 26, 2014	Haleakala	Pan-STARRS 1	·	2.3 km	MPC · JPL
768232	2015 BN_{348}	—	May 6, 2011	Mount Lemmon	Mount Lemmon Survey	EOS	1.4 km	MPC · JPL
768233	2015 BS_{349}	—	April 6, 2011	Mount Lemmon	Mount Lemmon Survey	·	2.3 km	MPC · JPL
768234	2015 BZ_{350}	—	September 19, 1998	Apache Point	SDSS	·	900 m	MPC · JPL
768235	2015 BH_{356}	—	December 30, 2007	Kitt Peak	Spacewatch	·	470 m	MPC · JPL
768236	2015 BL_{357}	—	December 19, 2007	Kitt Peak	Spacewatch	·	600 m	MPC · JPL
768237	2015 BA_{358}	—	January 20, 2015	Haleakala	Pan-STARRS 1	·	2.5 km	MPC · JPL
768238	2015 BC_{358}	—	January 20, 2015	Haleakala	Pan-STARRS 1	·	2.2 km	MPC · JPL
768239	2015 BR_{361}	—	November 24, 2009	Kitt Peak	Spacewatch	HOF	1.8 km	MPC · JPL
768240	2015 BX_{365}	—	November 11, 2010	Mount Lemmon	Mount Lemmon Survey	·	720 m	MPC · JPL
768241	2015 BO_{370}	—	September 17, 2006	Kitt Peak	Spacewatch	·	630 m	MPC · JPL
768242	2015 BD_{377}	—	September 5, 2013	Kitt Peak	Spacewatch	EOS	1.4 km	MPC · JPL
768243	2015 BY_{377}	—	January 20, 2015	Haleakala	Pan-STARRS 1	·	1.5 km	MPC · JPL
768244	2015 BH_{385}	—	August 14, 2012	Kitt Peak	Spacewatch	·	2.1 km	MPC · JPL
768245	2015 BU_{385}	—	October 28, 2013	Mount Lemmon	Mount Lemmon Survey	·	1.6 km	MPC · JPL
768246	2015 BJ_{391}	—	March 13, 2012	Mount Lemmon	Mount Lemmon Survey	·	520 m	MPC · JPL
768247	2015 BJ_{393}	—	September 15, 2007	Lulin	LUSS	·	2.1 km	MPC · JPL
768248	2015 BP_{393}	—	October 13, 2007	Mount Lemmon	Mount Lemmon Survey	·	1.9 km	MPC · JPL
768249	2015 BK_{394}	—	October 24, 2013	Mount Lemmon	Mount Lemmon Survey	·	1.6 km	MPC · JPL
768250	2015 BL_{396}	—	January 20, 2015	Haleakala	Pan-STARRS 1	EOS	1.2 km	MPC · JPL
768251	2015 BR_{402}	—	October 31, 2010	Mount Lemmon	Mount Lemmon Survey	·	490 m	MPC · JPL
768252	2015 BL_{408}	—	December 21, 2008	Kitt Peak	Spacewatch	·	2.0 km	MPC · JPL
768253	2015 BZ_{408}	—	November 18, 2007	Kitt Peak	Spacewatch	·	480 m	MPC · JPL
768254	2015 BD_{409}	—	March 21, 2010	Mount Lemmon	Mount Lemmon Survey	THM	1.7 km	MPC · JPL
768255	2015 BN_{412}	—	February 13, 2008	Kitt Peak	Spacewatch	·	670 m	MPC · JPL
768256	2015 BB_{413}	—	January 20, 2015	Haleakala	Pan-STARRS 1	·	1.8 km	MPC · JPL
768257	2015 BL_{413}	—	September 13, 2007	Mount Lemmon	Mount Lemmon Survey	·	2.2 km	MPC · JPL
768258	2015 BB_{414}	—	March 26, 2008	Mount Lemmon	Mount Lemmon Survey	·	860 m	MPC · JPL
768259	2015 BB_{416}	—	January 20, 2015	Haleakala	Pan-STARRS 1	·	1.7 km	MPC · JPL
768260	2015 BE_{416}	—	January 20, 2015	Haleakala	Pan-STARRS 1	·	1.9 km	MPC · JPL
768261	2015 BM_{418}	—	January 20, 2015	Haleakala	Pan-STARRS 1	·	1.8 km	MPC · JPL
768262	2015 BJ_{419}	—	March 13, 2008	Kitt Peak	Spacewatch	MAS	520 m	MPC · JPL
768263	2015 BT_{419}	—	January 20, 2015	Haleakala	Pan-STARRS 1	·	2.0 km	MPC · JPL
768264	2015 BF_{420}	—	January 20, 2015	Haleakala	Pan-STARRS 1	·	1.9 km	MPC · JPL
768265	2015 BA_{423}	—	January 20, 2015	Haleakala	Pan-STARRS 1	·	1.7 km	MPC · JPL
768266	2015 BA_{424}	—	January 20, 2015	Haleakala	Pan-STARRS 1	·	1.9 km	MPC · JPL
768267	2015 BO_{424}	—	January 20, 2015	Haleakala	Pan-STARRS 1	·	570 m	MPC · JPL
768268	2015 BX_{425}	—	January 20, 2015	Haleakala	Pan-STARRS 1	·	2.2 km	MPC · JPL
768269	2015 BB_{427}	—	January 20, 2015	Haleakala	Pan-STARRS 1	VER	2.3 km	MPC · JPL
768270	2015 BY_{428}	—	April 21, 2012	Mount Lemmon	Mount Lemmon Survey	·	510 m	MPC · JPL
768271	2015 BZ_{428}	—	August 26, 2012	Haleakala	Pan-STARRS 1	·	2.3 km	MPC · JPL
768272	2015 BJ_{429}	—	January 20, 2015	Haleakala	Pan-STARRS 1	V	370 m	MPC · JPL
768273	2015 BK_{429}	—	January 20, 2015	Haleakala	Pan-STARRS 1	HYG	2.2 km	MPC · JPL
768274	2015 BQ_{432}	—	May 22, 2012	ESA OGS	ESA OGS	·	830 m	MPC · JPL
768275	2015 BR_{434}	—	January 20, 2015	Haleakala	Pan-STARRS 1	EOS	1.2 km	MPC · JPL
768276	2015 BZ_{436}	—	January 20, 2015	Haleakala	Pan-STARRS 1	·	2.2 km	MPC · JPL
768277	2015 BY_{437}	—	May 1, 2012	Mount Lemmon	Mount Lemmon Survey	CLA	1.2 km	MPC · JPL
768278	2015 BE_{440}	—	January 20, 2015	Haleakala	Pan-STARRS 1	·	2.2 km	MPC · JPL
768279	2015 BP_{440}	—	September 3, 2008	Kitt Peak	Spacewatch	·	1.4 km	MPC · JPL
768280	2015 BY_{443}	—	February 7, 2011	Mount Lemmon	Mount Lemmon Survey	·	870 m	MPC · JPL
768281	2015 BA_{445}	—	September 3, 2013	Mount Lemmon	Mount Lemmon Survey	·	1.9 km	MPC · JPL
768282	2015 BX_{445}	—	January 20, 2015	Haleakala	Pan-STARRS 1	·	2.3 km	MPC · JPL
768283	2015 BA_{446}	—	January 20, 2015	Haleakala	Pan-STARRS 1	·	1.9 km	MPC · JPL
768284	2015 BA_{448}	—	January 2, 2009	Mount Lemmon	Mount Lemmon Survey	·	2.1 km	MPC · JPL
768285	2015 BU_{448}	—	December 18, 2007	Mount Lemmon	Mount Lemmon Survey	·	520 m	MPC · JPL
768286	2015 BV_{448}	—	January 20, 2015	Haleakala	Pan-STARRS 1	·	1.4 km	MPC · JPL
768287	2015 BE_{450}	—	May 24, 2001	Cerro Tololo	Deep Ecliptic Survey	·	2.0 km	MPC · JPL
768288	2015 BC_{452}	—	March 4, 2005	Mount Lemmon	Mount Lemmon Survey	·	490 m	MPC · JPL
768289	2015 BC_{453}	—	September 1, 2013	Mount Lemmon	Mount Lemmon Survey	·	480 m	MPC · JPL
768290	2015 BD_{453}	—	January 20, 2015	Haleakala	Pan-STARRS 1	EOS	1.3 km	MPC · JPL
768291	2015 BM_{454}	—	January 20, 2015	Haleakala	Pan-STARRS 1	V	530 m	MPC · JPL
768292	2015 BZ_{455}	—	February 13, 2008	Kitt Peak	Spacewatch	·	690 m	MPC · JPL
768293	2015 BG_{464}	—	December 3, 2013	Haleakala	Pan-STARRS 1	·	2.3 km	MPC · JPL
768294	2015 BO_{464}	—	January 20, 2015	Haleakala	Pan-STARRS 1	EUP	3.2 km	MPC · JPL
768295	2015 BR_{465}	—	January 20, 2015	Haleakala	Pan-STARRS 1	·	2.5 km	MPC · JPL
768296	2015 BK_{470}	—	January 20, 2015	Haleakala	Pan-STARRS 1	·	500 m	MPC · JPL
768297	2015 BM_{471}	—	January 20, 2015	Haleakala	Pan-STARRS 1	·	1.4 km	MPC · JPL
768298	2015 BA_{473}	—	January 20, 2015	Haleakala	Pan-STARRS 1	EOS	1.3 km	MPC · JPL
768299	2015 BY_{479}	—	January 20, 2015	Haleakala	Pan-STARRS 1	·	2.1 km	MPC · JPL
768300	2015 BO_{480}	—	January 20, 2015	Haleakala	Pan-STARRS 1	·	2.4 km	MPC · JPL

== 768301–768400 ==
back to top

Designation			Discovery			Properties		Ref
Permanent	Provisional	Named after	Date	Site	Discoverer(s)	Category	Diam.	Ref
768301	2015 BQ_{483}	—	January 15, 2009	Kitt Peak	Spacewatch	·	2.5 km	MPC · JPL
768302	2015 BW_{483}	—	October 26, 2013	Mount Lemmon	Mount Lemmon Survey	HOF	1.9 km	MPC · JPL
768303	2015 BF_{485}	—	January 20, 2015	Haleakala	Pan-STARRS 1	·	2.0 km	MPC · JPL
768304	2015 BJ_{485}	—	July 2, 2013	Haleakala	Pan-STARRS 1	·	550 m	MPC · JPL
768305	2015 BL_{486}	—	January 20, 2015	Haleakala	Pan-STARRS 1	·	440 m	MPC · JPL
768306	2015 BV_{487}	—	April 10, 2012	Kitt Peak	Spacewatch	·	570 m	MPC · JPL
768307	2015 BB_{488}	—	January 20, 2015	Haleakala	Pan-STARRS 1	EOS	1.4 km	MPC · JPL
768308	2015 BL_{489}	—	January 20, 2015	Haleakala	Pan-STARRS 1	·	1.5 km	MPC · JPL
768309	2015 BO_{490}	—	January 20, 2015	Kitt Peak	Spacewatch	·	1.3 km	MPC · JPL
768310	2015 BF_{491}	—	October 8, 2007	Mount Lemmon	Mount Lemmon Survey	·	1.8 km	MPC · JPL
768311	2015 BZ_{491}	—	May 8, 2005	Mount Lemmon	Mount Lemmon Survey	THM	2.0 km	MPC · JPL
768312	2015 BF_{492}	—	September 14, 2013	Haleakala	Pan-STARRS 1	·	750 m	MPC · JPL
768313	2015 BB_{493}	—	January 18, 2009	Mount Lemmon	Mount Lemmon Survey	·	2.6 km	MPC · JPL
768314	2015 BE_{493}	—	January 20, 2015	Haleakala	Pan-STARRS 1	·	2.3 km	MPC · JPL
768315	2015 BS_{497}	—	January 20, 2015	Haleakala	Pan-STARRS 1	·	1.6 km	MPC · JPL
768316	2015 BU_{497}	—	November 30, 2008	Mount Lemmon	Mount Lemmon Survey	·	1.6 km	MPC · JPL
768317	2015 BU_{498}	—	November 7, 2010	Mount Lemmon	Mount Lemmon Survey	·	710 m	MPC · JPL
768318	2015 BH_{501}	—	January 20, 2015	Haleakala	Pan-STARRS 1	EOS	1.3 km	MPC · JPL
768319	2015 BR_{503}	—	October 12, 2007	Mount Lemmon	Mount Lemmon Survey	·	460 m	MPC · JPL
768320	2015 BM_{504}	—	November 8, 2013	Kitt Peak	Spacewatch	·	2.1 km	MPC · JPL
768321	2015 BX_{507}	—	January 20, 2015	Haleakala	Pan-STARRS 1	EOS	1.2 km	MPC · JPL
768322	2015 BT_{508}	—	November 26, 2014	Haleakala	Pan-STARRS 1	URS	2.9 km	MPC · JPL
768323	2015 BZ_{508}	—	October 23, 2013	Mount Lemmon	Mount Lemmon Survey	·	2.1 km	MPC · JPL
768324	2015 BK_{511}	—	May 1, 2012	Mount Lemmon	Mount Lemmon Survey	·	520 m	MPC · JPL
768325 Geyagugv	2015 BP_{519}	Geyagugv	January 17, 2015	Cerro Tololo	Dark Energy Survey	ESDO	516 km	MPC · JPL
768326	2015 BV_{519}	—	January 17, 2015	Haleakala	Pan-STARRS 1	H	370 m	MPC · JPL
768327	2015 BW_{520}	—	March 16, 2007	Catalina	CSS	H	440 m	MPC · JPL
768328	2015 BO_{521}	—	December 18, 2015	Mount Lemmon	Mount Lemmon Survey	L5	6.6 km	MPC · JPL
768329	2015 BS_{527}	—	January 18, 2015	Haleakala	Pan-STARRS 1	H	330 m	MPC · JPL
768330	2015 BK_{528}	—	January 22, 2015	Mount Lemmon	Mount Lemmon Survey	H	440 m	MPC · JPL
768331	2015 BD_{532}	—	January 23, 2015	Haleakala	Pan-STARRS 1	·	1.7 km	MPC · JPL
768332	2015 BQ_{532}	—	January 16, 2004	Kitt Peak	Spacewatch	·	1.6 km	MPC · JPL
768333	2015 BE_{538}	—	November 1, 2006	Mount Lemmon	Mount Lemmon Survey	·	650 m	MPC · JPL
768334	2015 BF_{540}	—	November 9, 2008	Mount Lemmon	Mount Lemmon Survey	·	1.5 km	MPC · JPL
768335	2015 BV_{540}	—	November 9, 2013	Haleakala	Pan-STARRS 1	·	2.1 km	MPC · JPL
768336	2015 BQ_{541}	—	October 15, 2007	Mount Lemmon	Mount Lemmon Survey	·	2.0 km	MPC · JPL
768337	2015 BV_{541}	—	February 13, 2008	Mount Lemmon	Mount Lemmon Survey	V	480 m	MPC · JPL
768338	2015 BG_{542}	—	January 23, 2015	Haleakala	Pan-STARRS 1	MAS	570 m	MPC · JPL
768339	2015 BP_{542}	—	January 26, 2015	Haleakala	Pan-STARRS 1	LUT	4.0 km	MPC · JPL
768340	2015 BV_{542}	—	January 29, 2015	Haleakala	Pan-STARRS 1	NYS	760 m	MPC · JPL
768341	2015 BC_{543}	—	January 17, 2015	Haleakala	Pan-STARRS 1	·	2.1 km	MPC · JPL
768342	2015 BQ_{544}	—	January 27, 2015	Haleakala	Pan-STARRS 1	·	1.4 km	MPC · JPL
768343	2015 BO_{545}	—	February 20, 2009	Mount Lemmon	Mount Lemmon Survey	·	2.3 km	MPC · JPL
768344	2015 BW_{545}	—	January 23, 2015	Haleakala	Pan-STARRS 1	·	2.1 km	MPC · JPL
768345	2015 BD_{550}	—	January 10, 2011	Mount Lemmon	Mount Lemmon Survey	PHO	750 m	MPC · JPL
768346	2015 BG_{552}	—	January 17, 2015	Mount Lemmon	Mount Lemmon Survey	·	2.6 km	MPC · JPL
768347	2015 BO_{552}	—	August 14, 2012	Haleakala	Pan-STARRS 1	ELF	2.8 km	MPC · JPL
768348	2015 BJ_{556}	—	December 29, 2014	Haleakala	Pan-STARRS 1	·	2.3 km	MPC · JPL
768349	2015 BG_{559}	—	December 19, 2009	Mount Lemmon	Mount Lemmon Survey	·	1.4 km	MPC · JPL
768350	2015 BL_{559}	—	May 16, 2012	Mount Lemmon	Mount Lemmon Survey	·	1.0 km	MPC · JPL
768351	2015 BS_{559}	—	October 16, 2007	Kitt Peak	Spacewatch	·	510 m	MPC · JPL
768352	2015 BA_{560}	—	January 18, 2015	Mount Lemmon	Mount Lemmon Survey	·	2.3 km	MPC · JPL
768353	2015 BU_{561}	—	January 20, 2015	Haleakala	Pan-STARRS 1	·	1.5 km	MPC · JPL
768354	2015 BJ_{562}	—	November 17, 2014	Mount Lemmon	Mount Lemmon Survey	·	560 m	MPC · JPL
768355	2015 BC_{567}	—	January 30, 2008	Mount Lemmon	Mount Lemmon Survey	·	670 m	MPC · JPL
768356	2015 BD_{569}	—	January 22, 2015	Haleakala	Pan-STARRS 1	·	470 m	MPC · JPL
768357	2015 BM_{571}	—	January 17, 2015	Haleakala	Pan-STARRS 1	EUP	2.6 km	MPC · JPL
768358	2015 BP_{572}	—	October 9, 2017	Mount Lemmon	Mount Lemmon Survey	PHO	980 m	MPC · JPL
768359	2015 BG_{576}	—	September 10, 2007	Catalina	CSS	·	2.9 km	MPC · JPL
768360	2015 BL_{581}	—	January 28, 2015	Haleakala	Pan-STARRS 1	·	2.2 km	MPC · JPL
768361	2015 BJ_{583}	—	January 27, 2015	Haleakala	Pan-STARRS 1	·	2.0 km	MPC · JPL
768362	2015 BC_{585}	—	January 22, 2015	Haleakala	Pan-STARRS 1	·	1.2 km	MPC · JPL
768363	2015 BX_{585}	—	January 20, 2015	Haleakala	Pan-STARRS 1	·	2.2 km	MPC · JPL
768364	2015 BW_{587}	—	January 21, 2015	Haleakala	Pan-STARRS 1	·	1.9 km	MPC · JPL
768365	2015 BP_{589}	—	January 26, 2015	Haleakala	Pan-STARRS 1	·	1.8 km	MPC · JPL
768366	2015 BN_{590}	—	October 10, 2012	Haleakala	Pan-STARRS 1	·	2.9 km	MPC · JPL
768367	2015 BT_{590}	—	January 19, 2015	Mount Lemmon	Mount Lemmon Survey	·	1.4 km	MPC · JPL
768368	2015 BC_{591}	—	January 18, 2015	Haleakala	Pan-STARRS 1	·	2.2 km	MPC · JPL
768369	2015 BG_{591}	—	January 25, 2015	Haleakala	Pan-STARRS 1	·	1.8 km	MPC · JPL
768370	2015 BX_{591}	—	January 20, 2015	Mount Lemmon	Mount Lemmon Survey	·	2.1 km	MPC · JPL
768371	2015 BA_{592}	—	January 16, 2015	Haleakala	Pan-STARRS 1	·	2.1 km	MPC · JPL
768372	2015 BD_{592}	—	January 21, 2015	Haleakala	Pan-STARRS 1	·	750 m	MPC · JPL
768373	2015 BB_{593}	—	January 22, 2015	Haleakala	Pan-STARRS 1	ARM	2.2 km	MPC · JPL
768374	2015 BK_{593}	—	January 18, 2015	Mount Lemmon	Mount Lemmon Survey	·	2.4 km	MPC · JPL
768375	2015 BM_{594}	—	January 27, 2015	Haleakala	Pan-STARRS 1	·	2.4 km	MPC · JPL
768376	2015 BO_{594}	—	January 22, 2015	Haleakala	Pan-STARRS 1	·	1.7 km	MPC · JPL
768377	2015 BV_{594}	—	January 21, 2015	Haleakala	Pan-STARRS 1	·	2.3 km	MPC · JPL
768378	2015 BF_{595}	—	January 16, 2015	Haleakala	Pan-STARRS 1	·	2.2 km	MPC · JPL
768379	2015 BL_{595}	—	January 22, 2015	Haleakala	Pan-STARRS 1	·	1.8 km	MPC · JPL
768380	2015 BT_{595}	—	January 21, 2015	Haleakala	Pan-STARRS 1	·	2.1 km	MPC · JPL
768381	2015 BZ_{595}	—	January 16, 2015	Haleakala	Pan-STARRS 1	·	2.3 km	MPC · JPL
768382	2015 BH_{596}	—	January 18, 2015	Mount Lemmon	Mount Lemmon Survey	·	1.6 km	MPC · JPL
768383	2015 BM_{596}	—	January 23, 2015	Haleakala	Pan-STARRS 1	EOS	1.3 km	MPC · JPL
768384	2015 BN_{596}	—	January 20, 2015	Mount Lemmon	Mount Lemmon Survey	EOS	1.6 km	MPC · JPL
768385	2015 BV_{596}	—	January 22, 2015	Haleakala	Pan-STARRS 1	·	1.4 km	MPC · JPL
768386	2015 BZ_{596}	—	January 21, 2015	Haleakala	Pan-STARRS 1	·	1.6 km	MPC · JPL
768387	2015 BB_{597}	—	January 28, 2015	Haleakala	Pan-STARRS 1	·	3.0 km	MPC · JPL
768388	2015 BJ_{597}	—	January 19, 2015	Haleakala	Pan-STARRS 1	·	1.5 km	MPC · JPL
768389	2015 BQ_{597}	—	January 17, 2015	Haleakala	Pan-STARRS 1	EOS	1.6 km	MPC · JPL
768390	2015 BA_{598}	—	January 28, 2015	Haleakala	Pan-STARRS 1	(1118)	2.5 km	MPC · JPL
768391	2015 BB_{598}	—	January 27, 2015	Haleakala	Pan-STARRS 1	·	2.0 km	MPC · JPL
768392	2015 BE_{598}	—	January 22, 2015	Haleakala	Pan-STARRS 1	EOS	1.6 km	MPC · JPL
768393	2015 BC_{601}	—	January 20, 2015	Haleakala	Pan-STARRS 1	EOS	1.5 km	MPC · JPL
768394	2015 BX_{601}	—	January 27, 2015	Haleakala	Pan-STARRS 1	·	1.5 km	MPC · JPL
768395	2015 BA_{603}	—	January 29, 2015	Haleakala	Pan-STARRS 1	·	1.1 km	MPC · JPL
768396	2015 BS_{604}	—	January 17, 2015	Mount Lemmon	Mount Lemmon Survey	·	2.6 km	MPC · JPL
768397	2015 BA_{605}	—	December 2, 2008	Kitt Peak	Spacewatch	·	2.7 km	MPC · JPL
768398	2015 BD_{605}	—	January 28, 2015	Haleakala	Pan-STARRS 1	·	2.3 km	MPC · JPL
768399	2015 BW_{605}	—	January 28, 2015	Haleakala	Pan-STARRS 1	EOS	1.2 km	MPC · JPL
768400	2015 BM_{606}	—	January 27, 2015	Haleakala	Pan-STARRS 1	·	2.7 km	MPC · JPL

== 768401–768500 ==
back to top

Designation			Discovery			Properties		Ref
Permanent	Provisional	Named after	Date	Site	Discoverer(s)	Category	Diam.	Ref
768401	2015 BX_{606}	—	January 20, 2015	Haleakala	Pan-STARRS 1	·	2.4 km	MPC · JPL
768402	2015 BY_{606}	—	January 28, 2015	Haleakala	Pan-STARRS 1	·	2.2 km	MPC · JPL
768403	2015 BE_{607}	—	January 19, 2015	Haleakala	Pan-STARRS 1	·	2.2 km	MPC · JPL
768404	2015 BO_{607}	—	January 19, 2015	Mount Lemmon	Mount Lemmon Survey	·	2.4 km	MPC · JPL
768405	2015 BP_{607}	—	January 22, 2015	Haleakala	Pan-STARRS 1	·	620 m	MPC · JPL
768406	2015 BQ_{607}	—	January 29, 2015	Haleakala	Pan-STARRS 1	VER	2.1 km	MPC · JPL
768407	2015 BU_{607}	—	January 27, 2015	Haleakala	Pan-STARRS 1	·	2.5 km	MPC · JPL
768408	2015 BX_{607}	—	January 20, 2015	Haleakala	Pan-STARRS 1	URS	2.2 km	MPC · JPL
768409	2015 BY_{607}	—	January 20, 2015	Haleakala	Pan-STARRS 1	·	2.2 km	MPC · JPL
768410	2015 BB_{608}	—	January 17, 2015	Haleakala	Pan-STARRS 1	·	1.4 km	MPC · JPL
768411	2015 BF_{608}	—	January 24, 2015	Haleakala	Pan-STARRS 1	EOS	1.5 km	MPC · JPL
768412	2015 BH_{608}	—	January 16, 2015	Haleakala	Pan-STARRS 1	EOS	1.3 km	MPC · JPL
768413	2015 BC_{609}	—	January 18, 2015	Mount Lemmon	Mount Lemmon Survey	·	2.7 km	MPC · JPL
768414	2015 BG_{609}	—	January 20, 2015	Haleakala	Pan-STARRS 1	·	2.5 km	MPC · JPL
768415	2015 BY_{609}	—	January 18, 2015	Mount Lemmon	Mount Lemmon Survey	·	2.3 km	MPC · JPL
768416	2015 BB_{612}	—	January 19, 2015	Haleakala	Pan-STARRS 1	·	2.2 km	MPC · JPL
768417	2015 BV_{613}	—	January 21, 2015	Haleakala	Pan-STARRS 1	·	830 m	MPC · JPL
768418	2015 BY_{613}	—	January 17, 2015	Haleakala	Pan-STARRS 1	·	510 m	MPC · JPL
768419	2015 BE_{614}	—	January 21, 2015	Haleakala	Pan-STARRS 1	V	430 m	MPC · JPL
768420	2015 BJ_{614}	—	January 20, 2015	Haleakala	Pan-STARRS 1	·	830 m	MPC · JPL
768421	2015 BS_{617}	—	January 23, 2015	Haleakala	Pan-STARRS 1	·	2.4 km	MPC · JPL
768422	2015 BX_{617}	—	January 28, 2015	Haleakala	Pan-STARRS 1	VER	2.2 km	MPC · JPL
768423	2015 BB_{618}	—	January 21, 2015	Haleakala	Pan-STARRS 1	URS	2.3 km	MPC · JPL
768424	2015 BQ_{618}	—	January 23, 2015	Haleakala	Pan-STARRS 1	·	2.3 km	MPC · JPL
768425	2015 BZ_{618}	—	September 23, 2008	Kitt Peak	Spacewatch	·	1.5 km	MPC · JPL
768426	2015 CF_{2}	—	December 21, 2014	Haleakala	Pan-STARRS 1	TIR	2.1 km	MPC · JPL
768427	2015 CY_{6}	—	January 20, 2015	Haleakala	Pan-STARRS 1	ELF	2.8 km	MPC · JPL
768428	2015 CB_{7}	—	November 8, 2013	Mount Lemmon	Mount Lemmon Survey	KOR	1.1 km	MPC · JPL
768429	2015 CY_{7}	—	January 20, 2015	Haleakala	Pan-STARRS 1	·	3.1 km	MPC · JPL
768430	2015 CS_{8}	—	January 21, 2015	Haleakala	Pan-STARRS 1	·	2.2 km	MPC · JPL
768431	2015 CC_{16}	—	February 8, 2015	Mount Lemmon	Mount Lemmon Survey	EOS	1.3 km	MPC · JPL
768432	2015 CU_{17}	—	February 18, 2010	Mount Lemmon	Mount Lemmon Survey	EOS	1.7 km	MPC · JPL
768433	2015 CZ_{19}	—	January 17, 2015	Haleakala	Pan-STARRS 1	·	2.6 km	MPC · JPL
768434	2015 CP_{21}	—	February 4, 2006	Kitt Peak	Spacewatch	·	1.2 km	MPC · JPL
768435	2015 CB_{22}	—	August 21, 2012	Haleakala	Pan-STARRS 1	·	2.2 km	MPC · JPL
768436	2015 CJ_{22}	—	January 28, 2004	Kitt Peak	Spacewatch	THM	1.6 km	MPC · JPL
768437	2015 CW_{22}	—	June 15, 2013	Mount Lemmon	Mount Lemmon Survey	H	470 m	MPC · JPL
768438	2015 CY_{26}	—	September 30, 2013	Mount Lemmon	Mount Lemmon Survey	·	1.7 km	MPC · JPL
768439	2015 CF_{27}	—	October 3, 2013	Haleakala	Pan-STARRS 1	·	1.5 km	MPC · JPL
768440	2015 CP_{28}	—	February 26, 2012	Mount Lemmon	Mount Lemmon Survey	·	480 m	MPC · JPL
768441	2015 CE_{30}	—	January 20, 2015	Haleakala	Pan-STARRS 1	·	2.3 km	MPC · JPL
768442	2015 CO_{31}	—	March 13, 2010	Mount Lemmon	Mount Lemmon Survey	·	2.0 km	MPC · JPL
768443	2015 CG_{34}	—	December 21, 2014	Haleakala	Pan-STARRS 1	EOS	1.7 km	MPC · JPL
768444	2015 CK_{34}	—	December 21, 2014	Haleakala	Pan-STARRS 1	·	2.1 km	MPC · JPL
768445	2015 CK_{38}	—	January 18, 2015	Haleakala	Pan-STARRS 1	·	2.5 km	MPC · JPL
768446	2015 CK_{41}	—	December 18, 2014	Haleakala	Pan-STARRS 1	·	2.1 km	MPC · JPL
768447	2015 CW_{44}	—	January 30, 2004	Kitt Peak	Spacewatch	·	1.6 km	MPC · JPL
768448	2015 CY_{47}	—	January 14, 2011	Mount Lemmon	Mount Lemmon Survey	·	940 m	MPC · JPL
768449	2015 CA_{49}	—	October 21, 2003	Kitt Peak	Spacewatch	·	520 m	MPC · JPL
768450	2015 CL_{54}	—	March 16, 2004	Kitt Peak	Spacewatch	·	850 m	MPC · JPL
768451	2015 CD_{59}	—	January 11, 2008	Mount Lemmon	Mount Lemmon Survey	·	480 m	MPC · JPL
768452	2015 CR_{67}	—	January 19, 2015	Mount Lemmon	Mount Lemmon Survey	·	2.0 km	MPC · JPL
768453	2015 CE_{68}	—	February 13, 2002	Apache Point	SDSS	·	1.1 km	MPC · JPL
768454	2015 CH_{72}	—	February 8, 2015	Mount Lemmon	Mount Lemmon Survey	KOR	960 m	MPC · JPL
768455	2015 CM_{72}	—	February 13, 2015	Mount Lemmon	Mount Lemmon Survey	·	2.3 km	MPC · JPL
768456	2015 CC_{73}	—	February 9, 2015	Mount Lemmon	Mount Lemmon Survey	EOS	1.4 km	MPC · JPL
768457	2015 CD_{73}	—	February 9, 2015	Mount Lemmon	Mount Lemmon Survey	·	1.7 km	MPC · JPL
768458	2015 CE_{73}	—	February 10, 2015	Mount Lemmon	Mount Lemmon Survey	EOS	1.4 km	MPC · JPL
768459	2015 CC_{74}	—	February 11, 2015	Mount Lemmon	Mount Lemmon Survey	·	2.1 km	MPC · JPL
768460	2015 CF_{74}	—	January 16, 2015	Mount Lemmon	Mount Lemmon Survey	·	2.4 km	MPC · JPL
768461	2015 CG_{76}	—	February 15, 2015	Haleakala	Pan-STARRS 1	·	2.6 km	MPC · JPL
768462	2015 CK_{76}	—	January 23, 2015	Haleakala	Pan-STARRS 1	·	2.2 km	MPC · JPL
768463	2015 CS_{76}	—	January 22, 2015	Haleakala	Pan-STARRS 1	·	2.3 km	MPC · JPL
768464	2015 CM_{77}	—	January 16, 2015	Haleakala	Pan-STARRS 1	·	2.1 km	MPC · JPL
768465	2015 CP_{77}	—	February 15, 2015	Haleakala	Pan-STARRS 1	·	1.3 km	MPC · JPL
768466	2015 CT_{77}	—	February 13, 2015	Mount Lemmon	Mount Lemmon Survey	·	1.5 km	MPC · JPL
768467	2015 CZ_{78}	—	January 23, 2015	Haleakala	Pan-STARRS 1	HOF	2.1 km	MPC · JPL
768468	2015 CX_{79}	—	October 30, 2013	Haleakala	Pan-STARRS 1	·	1.5 km	MPC · JPL
768469	2015 DF_{5}	—	December 4, 2010	Mount Lemmon	Mount Lemmon Survey	·	830 m	MPC · JPL
768470	2015 DU_{8}	—	February 10, 2010	Kitt Peak	Spacewatch	·	2.4 km	MPC · JPL
768471	2015 DO_{11}	—	October 5, 2013	Haleakala	Pan-STARRS 1	·	1.9 km	MPC · JPL
768472	2015 DT_{11}	—	November 17, 2009	Kitt Peak	Spacewatch	·	1.4 km	MPC · JPL
768473	2015 DR_{13}	—	December 18, 2014	Haleakala	Pan-STARRS 1	·	2.6 km	MPC · JPL
768474	2015 DF_{14}	—	January 26, 2015	Haleakala	Pan-STARRS 1	·	2.0 km	MPC · JPL
768475	2015 DJ_{16}	—	January 20, 2015	Haleakala	Pan-STARRS 1	·	1.4 km	MPC · JPL
768476	2015 DV_{21}	—	October 2, 2010	Mount Lemmon	Mount Lemmon Survey	·	510 m	MPC · JPL
768477	2015 DN_{22}	—	January 19, 2015	Mount Lemmon	Mount Lemmon Survey	·	2.5 km	MPC · JPL
768478	2015 DM_{24}	—	February 16, 2015	Haleakala	Pan-STARRS 1	·	560 m	MPC · JPL
768479	2015 DV_{25}	—	November 12, 2010	Mount Lemmon	Mount Lemmon Survey	·	500 m	MPC · JPL
768480	2015 DL_{27}	—	December 14, 2007	Mount Lemmon	Mount Lemmon Survey	·	460 m	MPC · JPL
768481	2015 DJ_{28}	—	October 25, 2001	Apache Point	SDSS	·	2.3 km	MPC · JPL
768482	2015 DL_{30}	—	November 11, 2013	Mount Lemmon	Mount Lemmon Survey	·	2.0 km	MPC · JPL
768483	2015 DN_{30}	—	January 16, 2009	Kitt Peak	Spacewatch	·	2.3 km	MPC · JPL
768484	2015 DU_{30}	—	February 16, 2015	Haleakala	Pan-STARRS 1	·	1.8 km	MPC · JPL
768485	2015 DY_{35}	—	November 9, 2013	Haleakala	Pan-STARRS 1	THM	1.8 km	MPC · JPL
768486	2015 DY_{39}	—	February 16, 2015	Haleakala	Pan-STARRS 1	·	2.5 km	MPC · JPL
768487	2015 DT_{40}	—	February 16, 2015	Haleakala	Pan-STARRS 1	·	1.9 km	MPC · JPL
768488	2015 DW_{40}	—	January 29, 2015	Haleakala	Pan-STARRS 1	·	560 m	MPC · JPL
768489	2015 DP_{41}	—	April 10, 2010	Mount Lemmon	Mount Lemmon Survey	·	2.4 km	MPC · JPL
768490	2015 DS_{42}	—	January 27, 2015	Haleakala	Pan-STARRS 1	·	2.4 km	MPC · JPL
768491	2015 DK_{45}	—	February 16, 2015	Haleakala	Pan-STARRS 1	·	2.1 km	MPC · JPL
768492	2015 DV_{45}	—	January 31, 2009	Mount Lemmon	Mount Lemmon Survey	·	2.2 km	MPC · JPL
768493	2015 DR_{47}	—	February 16, 2015	Haleakala	Pan-STARRS 1	·	2.1 km	MPC · JPL
768494	2015 DZ_{47}	—	January 29, 2015	Haleakala	Pan-STARRS 1	·	1.4 km	MPC · JPL
768495	2015 DL_{48}	—	September 6, 2013	Mount Lemmon	Mount Lemmon Survey	·	980 m	MPC · JPL
768496	2015 DO_{48}	—	February 6, 2008	Kitt Peak	Spacewatch	·	490 m	MPC · JPL
768497	2015 DC_{50}	—	August 17, 2012	Haleakala	Pan-STARRS 1	HOF	1.9 km	MPC · JPL
768498	2015 DU_{50}	—	January 27, 2015	Haleakala	Pan-STARRS 1	·	1.8 km	MPC · JPL
768499	2015 DY_{51}	—	September 26, 2006	Mount Lemmon	Mount Lemmon Survey	·	730 m	MPC · JPL
768500	2015 DF_{53}	—	July 30, 2000	Cerro Tololo	Deep Ecliptic Survey	VER	1.9 km	MPC · JPL

== 768501–768600 ==
back to top

Designation			Discovery			Properties		Ref
Permanent	Provisional	Named after	Date	Site	Discoverer(s)	Category	Diam.	Ref
768501	2015 DW_{59}	—	January 22, 2015	Haleakala	Pan-STARRS 1	·	840 m	MPC · JPL
768502	2015 DN_{61}	—	January 18, 2015	Haleakala	Pan-STARRS 1	EOS	1.2 km	MPC · JPL
768503	2015 DW_{62}	—	January 20, 2015	Haleakala	Pan-STARRS 1	·	2.5 km	MPC · JPL
768504	2015 DH_{63}	—	February 10, 2015	Mount Lemmon	Mount Lemmon Survey	·	2.1 km	MPC · JPL
768505	2015 DX_{63}	—	March 27, 2012	Bergisch Gladbach	W. Bickel	·	560 m	MPC · JPL
768506	2015 DX_{64}	—	February 16, 2015	Haleakala	Pan-STARRS 1	·	1.9 km	MPC · JPL
768507	2015 DF_{66}	—	January 22, 2015	Haleakala	Pan-STARRS 1	EOS	1.4 km	MPC · JPL
768508	2015 DN_{67}	—	December 21, 2008	Kitt Peak	Spacewatch	·	1.8 km	MPC · JPL
768509	2015 DU_{70}	—	January 22, 2015	Haleakala	Pan-STARRS 1	·	1.5 km	MPC · JPL
768510	2015 DH_{72}	—	February 16, 2015	Haleakala	Pan-STARRS 1	·	2.0 km	MPC · JPL
768511	2015 DV_{77}	—	January 20, 2015	Haleakala	Pan-STARRS 1	·	480 m	MPC · JPL
768512	2015 DA_{78}	—	October 2, 2010	Mount Lemmon	Mount Lemmon Survey	·	560 m	MPC · JPL
768513	2015 DE_{81}	—	January 27, 2015	Haleakala	Pan-STARRS 1	·	760 m	MPC · JPL
768514	2015 DH_{81}	—	February 1, 2009	Mount Lemmon	Mount Lemmon Survey	·	2.2 km	MPC · JPL
768515	2015 DK_{81}	—	September 12, 2007	Mount Lemmon	Mount Lemmon Survey	·	1.6 km	MPC · JPL
768516	2015 DW_{82}	—	September 15, 2007	Mount Lemmon	Mount Lemmon Survey	·	1.9 km	MPC · JPL
768517	2015 DB_{85}	—	February 10, 2015	Mount Lemmon	Mount Lemmon Survey	·	1.2 km	MPC · JPL
768518	2015 DB_{90}	—	January 22, 2015	Haleakala	Pan-STARRS 1	EOS	1.2 km	MPC · JPL
768519	2015 DH_{90}	—	January 20, 2015	Haleakala	Pan-STARRS 1	·	2.0 km	MPC · JPL
768520	2015 DJ_{90}	—	January 22, 2015	Haleakala	Pan-STARRS 1	·	2.1 km	MPC · JPL
768521	2015 DU_{94}	—	February 16, 2015	Haleakala	Pan-STARRS 1	·	1.4 km	MPC · JPL
768522	2015 DF_{101}	—	January 21, 2015	Mount Lemmon	Mount Lemmon Survey	·	690 m	MPC · JPL
768523	2015 DS_{101}	—	October 4, 2013	Haleakala	Pan-STARRS 1	EOS	1.2 km	MPC · JPL
768524	2015 DT_{101}	—	October 3, 2013	Kitt Peak	Spacewatch	·	2.1 km	MPC · JPL
768525	2015 DU_{102}	—	October 28, 2013	Kitt Peak	Spacewatch	EOS	1.6 km	MPC · JPL
768526	2015 DG_{103}	—	October 24, 2013	Mount Lemmon	Mount Lemmon Survey	EOS	1.5 km	MPC · JPL
768527	2015 DB_{107}	—	October 3, 2013	Haleakala	Pan-STARRS 1	·	2.2 km	MPC · JPL
768528	2015 DT_{107}	—	September 24, 2013	Mount Lemmon	Mount Lemmon Survey	·	2.0 km	MPC · JPL
768529	2015 DA_{109}	—	January 29, 2015	Haleakala	Pan-STARRS 1	·	2.1 km	MPC · JPL
768530	2015 DD_{109}	—	January 15, 2015	Haleakala	Pan-STARRS 1	·	1.9 km	MPC · JPL
768531	2015 DT_{109}	—	November 28, 2013	Mount Lemmon	Mount Lemmon Survey	VER	1.9 km	MPC · JPL
768532	2015 DD_{112}	—	October 2, 2013	Haleakala	Pan-STARRS 1	·	1.8 km	MPC · JPL
768533	2015 DW_{116}	—	October 13, 2007	Mount Lemmon	Mount Lemmon Survey	·	2.6 km	MPC · JPL
768534	2015 DL_{119}	—	November 10, 2010	Mount Lemmon	Mount Lemmon Survey	·	450 m	MPC · JPL
768535	2015 DW_{120}	—	February 17, 2015	Haleakala	Pan-STARRS 1	·	2.0 km	MPC · JPL
768536	2015 DQ_{122}	—	December 29, 2014	Haleakala	Pan-STARRS 1	·	1.6 km	MPC · JPL
768537	2015 DP_{125}	—	November 2, 2013	Mount Lemmon	Mount Lemmon Survey	·	1.6 km	MPC · JPL
768538	2015 DS_{125}	—	September 14, 2013	Mount Lemmon	Mount Lemmon Survey	·	1.7 km	MPC · JPL
768539	2015 DB_{126}	—	February 17, 2015	Haleakala	Pan-STARRS 1	EOS	1.5 km	MPC · JPL
768540	2015 DJ_{127}	—	January 28, 2015	Haleakala	Pan-STARRS 1	·	2.4 km	MPC · JPL
768541	2015 DJ_{128}	—	February 27, 2009	Kitt Peak	Spacewatch	T_{j} (2.92)	3.2 km	MPC · JPL
768542	2015 DW_{128}	—	January 28, 2015	Haleakala	Pan-STARRS 1	·	680 m	MPC · JPL
768543	2015 DM_{131}	—	October 8, 2013	Mount Lemmon	Mount Lemmon Survey	·	1.6 km	MPC · JPL
768544	2015 DH_{132}	—	February 17, 2015	Haleakala	Pan-STARRS 1	·	2.0 km	MPC · JPL
768545	2015 DV_{133}	—	February 17, 2015	Haleakala	Pan-STARRS 1	TIR	2.4 km	MPC · JPL
768546	2015 DA_{136}	—	January 30, 2015	Haleakala	Pan-STARRS 1	·	630 m	MPC · JPL
768547	2015 DK_{137}	—	February 17, 2015	Haleakala	Pan-STARRS 1	·	2.4 km	MPC · JPL
768548	2015 DV_{137}	—	February 17, 2015	Haleakala	Pan-STARRS 1	·	2.7 km	MPC · JPL
768549	2015 DJ_{139}	—	January 20, 2015	Haleakala	Pan-STARRS 1	·	2.2 km	MPC · JPL
768550	2015 DU_{139}	—	January 18, 2015	Haleakala	Pan-STARRS 1	·	680 m	MPC · JPL
768551	2015 DJ_{140}	—	November 1, 2008	Mount Lemmon	Mount Lemmon Survey	·	1.5 km	MPC · JPL
768552	2015 DZ_{140}	—	January 21, 2015	Haleakala	Pan-STARRS 1	·	2.2 km	MPC · JPL
768553	2015 DX_{143}	—	January 17, 2015	Mount Lemmon	Mount Lemmon Survey	·	2.0 km	MPC · JPL
768554	2015 DV_{145}	—	August 26, 2003	Cerro Tololo	Deep Ecliptic Survey	·	500 m	MPC · JPL
768555	2015 DB_{146}	—	December 5, 2007	Kitt Peak	Spacewatch	·	520 m	MPC · JPL
768556	2015 DB_{147}	—	January 2, 2015	Haleakala	Pan-STARRS 1	·	640 m	MPC · JPL
768557	2015 DF_{147}	—	December 18, 2014	Haleakala	Pan-STARRS 1	·	2.3 km	MPC · JPL
768558	2015 DN_{149}	—	January 22, 2015	Haleakala	Pan-STARRS 1	·	2.3 km	MPC · JPL
768559	2015 DX_{149}	—	November 26, 2014	Haleakala	Pan-STARRS 1	·	2.6 km	MPC · JPL
768560	2015 DD_{151}	—	January 26, 2015	Haleakala	Pan-STARRS 1	·	1.8 km	MPC · JPL
768561	2015 DB_{155}	—	November 3, 2014	Mount Lemmon	Mount Lemmon Survey	H	540 m	MPC · JPL
768562	2015 DP_{156}	—	October 15, 2004	Kitt Peak	Deep Ecliptic Survey	·	1.5 km	MPC · JPL
768563	2015 DZ_{158}	—	December 22, 2008	Mount Lemmon	Mount Lemmon Survey	T_{j} (2.99)	3.1 km	MPC · JPL
768564	2015 DH_{163}	—	September 17, 2012	Kitt Peak	Spacewatch	·	2.3 km	MPC · JPL
768565	2015 DM_{163}	—	February 20, 2009	Kitt Peak	Spacewatch	·	2.2 km	MPC · JPL
768566	2015 DQ_{164}	—	September 13, 2007	Kitt Peak	Spacewatch	·	1.6 km	MPC · JPL
768567	2015 DT_{164}	—	October 10, 2007	Kitt Peak	Spacewatch	EOS	1.5 km	MPC · JPL
768568	2015 DZ_{166}	—	January 21, 2015	Haleakala	Pan-STARRS 1	TEL	1.0 km	MPC · JPL
768569	2015 DN_{169}	—	January 23, 2015	Haleakala	Pan-STARRS 1	·	2.8 km	MPC · JPL
768570	2015 DL_{170}	—	February 19, 2015	Haleakala	Pan-STARRS 1	·	2.3 km	MPC · JPL
768571	2015 DA_{173}	—	January 19, 2015	Haleakala	Pan-STARRS 1	·	2.1 km	MPC · JPL
768572	2015 DS_{182}	—	February 14, 2015	Mount Lemmon	Mount Lemmon Survey	·	2.2 km	MPC · JPL
768573	2015 DF_{183}	—	October 30, 2007	Kitt Peak	Spacewatch	·	2.1 km	MPC · JPL
768574	2015 DP_{183}	—	November 9, 2013	Haleakala	Pan-STARRS 1	·	1.8 km	MPC · JPL
768575	2015 DG_{184}	—	February 20, 2015	Haleakala	Pan-STARRS 1	·	1.4 km	MPC · JPL
768576	2015 DO_{184}	—	November 2, 2013	Kitt Peak	Spacewatch	EOS	1.4 km	MPC · JPL
768577	2015 DJ_{185}	—	February 20, 2015	Haleakala	Pan-STARRS 1	·	1.7 km	MPC · JPL
768578	2015 DF_{187}	—	January 17, 2015	Haleakala	Pan-STARRS 1	·	2.2 km	MPC · JPL
768579	2015 DU_{187}	—	November 8, 2013	Mount Lemmon	Mount Lemmon Survey	EOS	1.4 km	MPC · JPL
768580	2015 DH_{188}	—	January 27, 2015	Haleakala	Pan-STARRS 1	·	910 m	MPC · JPL
768581	2015 DL_{192}	—	October 23, 2013	Mount Lemmon	Mount Lemmon Survey	·	970 m	MPC · JPL
768582	2015 DQ_{192}	—	February 20, 2015	Haleakala	Pan-STARRS 1	·	700 m	MPC · JPL
768583	2015 DK_{195}	—	October 3, 2013	Mount Lemmon	Mount Lemmon Survey	·	2.4 km	MPC · JPL
768584	2015 DC_{196}	—	March 25, 2010	Mount Lemmon	Mount Lemmon Survey	·	2.6 km	MPC · JPL
768585	2015 DT_{197}	—	December 31, 2008	Mount Lemmon	Mount Lemmon Survey	TIR	2.0 km	MPC · JPL
768586	2015 DU_{200}	—	February 10, 2015	Mount Lemmon	Mount Lemmon Survey	·	770 m	MPC · JPL
768587	2015 DK_{202}	—	February 23, 2015	Haleakala	Pan-STARRS 1	·	2.2 km	MPC · JPL
768588	2015 DA_{205}	—	January 25, 2015	Haleakala	Pan-STARRS 1	·	920 m	MPC · JPL
768589	2015 DS_{220}	—	January 23, 2015	Haleakala	Pan-STARRS 1	H	370 m	MPC · JPL
768590	2015 DF_{225}	—	February 16, 2015	Haleakala	Pan-STARRS 1	H	340 m	MPC · JPL
768591	2015 DD_{227}	—	February 16, 2015	Haleakala	Pan-STARRS 1	·	2.7 km	MPC · JPL
768592	2015 DU_{227}	—	February 23, 2015	Haleakala	Pan-STARRS 1	V	470 m	MPC · JPL
768593	2015 DD_{233}	—	January 20, 2015	Mount Lemmon	Mount Lemmon Survey	·	2.4 km	MPC · JPL
768594	2015 DR_{235}	—	October 15, 2012	Haleakala	Pan-STARRS 1	·	2.4 km	MPC · JPL
768595	2015 DS_{235}	—	January 29, 2015	Haleakala	Pan-STARRS 1	·	2.5 km	MPC · JPL
768596	2015 DP_{237}	—	February 16, 2015	Haleakala	Pan-STARRS 1	·	2.8 km	MPC · JPL
768597	2015 DZ_{238}	—	February 16, 2015	Haleakala	Pan-STARRS 1	EOS	1.3 km	MPC · JPL
768598	2015 DU_{239}	—	December 5, 2007	Kitt Peak	Spacewatch	·	2.8 km	MPC · JPL
768599	2015 DH_{241}	—	October 23, 2013	Mount Lemmon	Mount Lemmon Survey	·	580 m	MPC · JPL
768600	2015 DL_{241}	—	November 12, 2013	Kitt Peak	Spacewatch	LIX	2.4 km	MPC · JPL

== 768601–768700 ==
back to top

Designation			Discovery			Properties		Ref
Permanent	Provisional	Named after	Date	Site	Discoverer(s)	Category	Diam.	Ref
768601	2015 DC_{242}	—	September 4, 2011	Haleakala	Pan-STARRS 1	(895)	2.9 km	MPC · JPL
768602	2015 DC_{243}	—	January 26, 2015	Haleakala	Pan-STARRS 1	·	1.4 km	MPC · JPL
768603	2015 DD_{243}	—	November 6, 2013	Catalina	CSS	LIX	2.8 km	MPC · JPL
768604	2015 DV_{243}	—	February 20, 2015	Haleakala	Pan-STARRS 1	·	2.3 km	MPC · JPL
768605	2015 DZ_{243}	—	January 20, 2015	Haleakala	Pan-STARRS 1	·	2.1 km	MPC · JPL
768606	2015 DZ_{244}	—	February 23, 2015	Haleakala	Pan-STARRS 1	VER	2.0 km	MPC · JPL
768607	2015 DY_{247}	—	January 21, 2015	Haleakala	Pan-STARRS 1	V	480 m	MPC · JPL
768608	2015 DL_{248}	—	February 27, 2015	Haleakala	Pan-STARRS 1	LIX	3.0 km	MPC · JPL
768609	2015 DW_{252}	—	February 18, 2015	Haleakala	Pan-STARRS 1	LUT	3.1 km	MPC · JPL
768610	2015 DX_{253}	—	February 16, 2015	Haleakala	Pan-STARRS 1	·	2.4 km	MPC · JPL
768611	2015 DG_{254}	—	February 23, 2015	Haleakala	Pan-STARRS 1	·	2.8 km	MPC · JPL
768612	2015 DC_{256}	—	February 16, 2015	Haleakala	Pan-STARRS 1	·	1.9 km	MPC · JPL
768613	2015 DM_{256}	—	February 18, 2015	Haleakala	Pan-STARRS 1	·	2.7 km	MPC · JPL
768614	2015 DU_{258}	—	February 24, 2015	Haleakala	Pan-STARRS 1	·	730 m	MPC · JPL
768615	2015 DE_{260}	—	February 23, 2015	Haleakala	Pan-STARRS 1	·	1.9 km	MPC · JPL
768616	2015 DP_{263}	—	February 23, 2015	Haleakala	Pan-STARRS 1	·	2.0 km	MPC · JPL
768617	2015 DC_{264}	—	January 5, 2003	Kitt Peak	Deep Lens Survey	·	2.2 km	MPC · JPL
768618	2015 DL_{264}	—	February 16, 2015	Haleakala	Pan-STARRS 1	·	1.9 km	MPC · JPL
768619	2015 DY_{264}	—	February 16, 2015	Haleakala	Pan-STARRS 1	·	2.2 km	MPC · JPL
768620	2015 DC_{265}	—	February 24, 2015	Haleakala	Pan-STARRS 1	TIR	2.3 km	MPC · JPL
768621	2015 DO_{265}	—	February 25, 2015	Haleakala	Pan-STARRS 1	·	1.5 km	MPC · JPL
768622	2015 DR_{265}	—	February 24, 2015	Haleakala	Pan-STARRS 1	VER	2.0 km	MPC · JPL
768623	2015 DB_{266}	—	February 16, 2015	Haleakala	Pan-STARRS 1	·	1.6 km	MPC · JPL
768624	2015 DK_{266}	—	February 17, 2015	Haleakala	Pan-STARRS 1	TIR	1.8 km	MPC · JPL
768625	2015 DR_{266}	—	February 26, 2015	Mount Lemmon	Mount Lemmon Survey	·	2.0 km	MPC · JPL
768626	2015 DU_{266}	—	October 16, 2012	Mount Lemmon	Mount Lemmon Survey	·	2.3 km	MPC · JPL
768627	2015 DY_{266}	—	February 23, 2015	Haleakala	Pan-STARRS 1	·	2.1 km	MPC · JPL
768628	2015 DD_{267}	—	February 19, 2015	Haleakala	Pan-STARRS 1	·	2.3 km	MPC · JPL
768629	2015 DP_{267}	—	February 23, 2015	Haleakala	Pan-STARRS 1	EOS	1.4 km	MPC · JPL
768630	2015 DU_{267}	—	October 17, 2012	Haleakala	Pan-STARRS 1	·	2.0 km	MPC · JPL
768631	2015 DE_{272}	—	February 17, 2015	Haleakala	Pan-STARRS 1	·	860 m	MPC · JPL
768632	2015 DZ_{273}	—	February 18, 2015	Kitt Peak	Spacewatch	EOS	1.2 km	MPC · JPL
768633	2015 DJ_{274}	—	February 24, 2015	Haleakala	Pan-STARRS 1	·	560 m	MPC · JPL
768634	2015 DU_{274}	—	February 16, 2015	Haleakala	Pan-STARRS 1	·	2.4 km	MPC · JPL
768635	2015 DQ_{276}	—	February 24, 2015	Haleakala	Pan-STARRS 1	·	590 m	MPC · JPL
768636	2015 DU_{276}	—	February 16, 2015	Haleakala	Pan-STARRS 1	EOS	1.4 km	MPC · JPL
768637	2015 DL_{277}	—	February 17, 2015	Haleakala	Pan-STARRS 1	·	1.7 km	MPC · JPL
768638	2015 DG_{279}	—	February 24, 2015	Haleakala	Pan-STARRS 1	V	540 m	MPC · JPL
768639	2015 DY_{279}	—	February 16, 2015	Haleakala	Pan-STARRS 1	·	2.7 km	MPC · JPL
768640	2015 DD_{280}	—	February 16, 2015	Haleakala	Pan-STARRS 1	·	570 m	MPC · JPL
768641	2015 DJ_{280}	—	March 6, 2008	Mount Lemmon	Mount Lemmon Survey	·	780 m	MPC · JPL
768642	2015 DA_{281}	—	February 23, 2015	Haleakala	Pan-STARRS 1	·	2.1 km	MPC · JPL
768643	2015 DW_{281}	—	February 23, 2015	Haleakala	Pan-STARRS 1	L4	6.2 km	MPC · JPL
768644	2015 DZ_{281}	—	February 23, 2015	Haleakala	Pan-STARRS 1	EOS	1.5 km	MPC · JPL
768645	2015 DM_{283}	—	February 19, 2015	Haleakala	Pan-STARRS 1	·	2.4 km	MPC · JPL
768646	2015 DY_{283}	—	April 17, 2010	Mount Lemmon	Mount Lemmon Survey	THM	1.8 km	MPC · JPL
768647	2015 DF_{284}	—	February 20, 2015	Haleakala	Pan-STARRS 1	EOS	1.5 km	MPC · JPL
768648	2015 DN_{284}	—	February 20, 2015	Mount Lemmon	Mount Lemmon Survey	·	2.4 km	MPC · JPL
768649	2015 DT_{285}	—	January 25, 2015	Haleakala	Pan-STARRS 1	EOS	1.3 km	MPC · JPL
768650	2015 DU_{285}	—	January 17, 2015	Haleakala	Pan-STARRS 1	EOS	1.5 km	MPC · JPL
768651	2015 DO_{286}	—	January 20, 2015	Haleakala	Pan-STARRS 1	·	1.8 km	MPC · JPL
768652	2015 DQ_{286}	—	February 16, 2015	Haleakala	Pan-STARRS 1	·	3.0 km	MPC · JPL
768653	2015 DT_{286}	—	February 16, 2015	Haleakala	Pan-STARRS 1	·	2.2 km	MPC · JPL
768654	2015 DW_{286}	—	February 18, 2015	Haleakala	Pan-STARRS 1	·	2.6 km	MPC · JPL
768655	2015 DS_{287}	—	February 16, 2015	Haleakala	Pan-STARRS 1	·	2.1 km	MPC · JPL
768656	2015 DJ_{288}	—	February 27, 2015	Haleakala	Pan-STARRS 1	L4	6.0 km	MPC · JPL
768657	2015 DN_{288}	—	February 23, 2015	Haleakala	Pan-STARRS 1	·	950 m	MPC · JPL
768658	2015 DT_{289}	—	February 16, 2015	Haleakala	Pan-STARRS 1	·	1.6 km	MPC · JPL
768659	2015 DW_{289}	—	February 20, 2015	Haleakala	Pan-STARRS 1	·	1.6 km	MPC · JPL
768660	2015 DR_{293}	—	February 17, 2015	Haleakala	Pan-STARRS 1	·	2.4 km	MPC · JPL
768661	2015 DT_{293}	—	October 12, 2007	Kitt Peak	Spacewatch	EOS	1.5 km	MPC · JPL
768662	2015 DB_{294}	—	September 27, 2000	Kitt Peak	Spacewatch	·	2.2 km	MPC · JPL
768663	2015 DD_{298}	—	October 9, 2012	Haleakala	Pan-STARRS 1	·	2.0 km	MPC · JPL
768664	2015 DF_{298}	—	February 20, 2015	Haleakala	Pan-STARRS 1	·	2.5 km	MPC · JPL
768665	2015 DN_{298}	—	February 24, 2015	Haleakala	Pan-STARRS 1	VER	2.0 km	MPC · JPL
768666	2015 DK_{299}	—	February 18, 2015	Haleakala	Pan-STARRS 1	L4	5.5 km	MPC · JPL
768667	2015 DR_{299}	—	February 23, 2015	Haleakala	Pan-STARRS 1	L4	6.3 km	MPC · JPL
768668	2015 DP_{302}	—	February 19, 2015	Haleakala	Pan-STARRS 1	·	620 m	MPC · JPL
768669	2015 DB_{305}	—	February 16, 2015	Haleakala	Pan-STARRS 1	·	2.2 km	MPC · JPL
768670	2015 DV_{305}	—	February 18, 2015	Haleakala	Pan-STARRS 1	·	2.7 km	MPC · JPL
768671	2015 DR_{311}	—	February 20, 2015	Haleakala	Pan-STARRS 1	WIT	660 m	MPC · JPL
768672	2015 DH_{316}	—	February 27, 2015	Haleakala	Pan-STARRS 1	EOS	1.3 km	MPC · JPL
768673	2015 DV_{316}	—	April 14, 2010	Mount Lemmon	Mount Lemmon Survey	·	2.3 km	MPC · JPL
768674	2015 EK_{1}	—	March 9, 2015	Mount Lemmon	Mount Lemmon Survey	·	2.5 km	MPC · JPL
768675	2015 EU_{3}	—	November 2, 2013	Kitt Peak	Spacewatch	·	2.3 km	MPC · JPL
768676	2015 ET_{5}	—	September 27, 2006	Kitt Peak	Spacewatch	·	2.4 km	MPC · JPL
768677	2015 EW_{11}	—	October 9, 2010	Mount Lemmon	Mount Lemmon Survey	·	530 m	MPC · JPL
768678	2015 EF_{16}	—	January 23, 2015	Haleakala	Pan-STARRS 1	·	780 m	MPC · JPL
768679	2015 EJ_{17}	—	January 18, 2015	Kitt Peak	Spacewatch	·	750 m	MPC · JPL
768680	2015 EO_{23}	—	February 16, 2015	Haleakala	Pan-STARRS 1	·	2.4 km	MPC · JPL
768681	2015 EZ_{23}	—	November 11, 2013	Kitt Peak	Spacewatch	·	2.1 km	MPC · JPL
768682	2015 EU_{26}	—	October 24, 2013	Mount Lemmon	Mount Lemmon Survey	·	1.7 km	MPC · JPL
768683	2015 EP_{28}	—	November 15, 2010	Kitt Peak	Spacewatch	·	610 m	MPC · JPL
768684	2015 EE_{29}	—	October 5, 2013	Haleakala	Pan-STARRS 1	·	1.3 km	MPC · JPL
768685	2015 EX_{32}	—	November 17, 2007	Mount Lemmon	Mount Lemmon Survey	·	2.4 km	MPC · JPL
768686	2015 EH_{35}	—	February 16, 2015	Haleakala	Pan-STARRS 1	·	520 m	MPC · JPL
768687	2015 ET_{37}	—	November 1, 2010	Mount Lemmon	Mount Lemmon Survey	·	490 m	MPC · JPL
768688	2015 ED_{40}	—	November 11, 2013	Mount Lemmon	Mount Lemmon Survey	·	1.4 km	MPC · JPL
768689	2015 EX_{41}	—	January 24, 2015	Haleakala	Pan-STARRS 1	·	1.7 km	MPC · JPL
768690	2015 EE_{44}	—	January 29, 2015	Haleakala	Pan-STARRS 1	·	780 m	MPC · JPL
768691	2015 EH_{47}	—	January 21, 2015	Haleakala	Pan-STARRS 1	·	2.2 km	MPC · JPL
768692	2015 ED_{50}	—	February 24, 2015	Haleakala	Pan-STARRS 1	·	2.3 km	MPC · JPL
768693 Șuran	2015 EJ_{55}	Șuran	June 4, 2011	Cerro Tololo	EURONEAR	HYG	2.3 km	MPC · JPL
768694	2015 EW_{55}	—	February 16, 2015	Haleakala	Pan-STARRS 1	HYG	2.1 km	MPC · JPL
768695	2015 ET_{57}	—	December 29, 2014	Haleakala	Pan-STARRS 1	·	2.6 km	MPC · JPL
768696	2015 EE_{58}	—	October 28, 2013	Mount Lemmon	Mount Lemmon Survey	EUP	2.5 km	MPC · JPL
768697	2015 ET_{59}	—	January 21, 2015	Mount Lemmon	Mount Lemmon Survey	V	480 m	MPC · JPL
768698	2015 EM_{60}	—	January 17, 2013	Haleakala	Pan-STARRS 1	L4	6.6 km	MPC · JPL
768699	2015 ED_{62}	—	February 19, 2015	Catalina	CSS	H	480 m	MPC · JPL
768700	2015 EY_{63}	—	November 12, 2013	Mount Lemmon	Mount Lemmon Survey	·	640 m	MPC · JPL

== 768701–768800 ==
back to top

Designation			Discovery			Properties		Ref
Permanent	Provisional	Named after	Date	Site	Discoverer(s)	Category	Diam.	Ref
768701	2015 EF_{66}	—	October 23, 2013	Mount Lemmon	Mount Lemmon Survey	·	1.8 km	MPC · JPL
768702	2015 EM_{66}	—	January 23, 2015	Haleakala	Pan-STARRS 1	·	1.4 km	MPC · JPL
768703	2015 ER_{66}	—	February 17, 2010	Kitt Peak	Spacewatch	·	1.8 km	MPC · JPL
768704	2015 EU_{66}	—	December 2, 2010	Mount Lemmon	Mount Lemmon Survey	V	480 m	MPC · JPL
768705	2015 EG_{67}	—	October 13, 2013	Kitt Peak	Spacewatch	·	2.2 km	MPC · JPL
768706	2015 ES_{68}	—	October 24, 2013	Mount Lemmon	Mount Lemmon Survey	THM	1.5 km	MPC · JPL
768707	2015 ED_{69}	—	March 14, 2015	Haleakala	Pan-STARRS 1	·	1.4 km	MPC · JPL
768708	2015 EQ_{70}	—	July 31, 2005	Mauna Kea	P. A. Wiegert, D. D. Balam	·	870 m	MPC · JPL
768709	2015 EN_{71}	—	October 8, 2007	Mount Lemmon	Mount Lemmon Survey	·	2.0 km	MPC · JPL
768710	2015 EN_{73}	—	March 14, 2015	Haleakala	Pan-STARRS 1	·	1 km	MPC · JPL
768711	2015 EP_{74}	—	November 27, 2013	Haleakala	Pan-STARRS 1	·	2.1 km	MPC · JPL
768712	2015 ED_{75}	—	November 1, 2013	Mount Lemmon	Mount Lemmon Survey	·	2.2 km	MPC · JPL
768713	2015 EK_{75}	—	January 21, 2015	Haleakala	Pan-STARRS 1	·	800 m	MPC · JPL
768714	2015 EL_{75}	—	September 21, 2012	Kitt Peak	Spacewatch	EOS	1.7 km	MPC · JPL
768715	2015 EH_{76}	—	March 15, 2015	Haleakala	Pan-STARRS 1	·	2.7 km	MPC · JPL
768716	2015 EJ_{76}	—	April 11, 2016	Haleakala	Pan-STARRS 1	·	2.6 km	MPC · JPL
768717	2015 ET_{76}	—	March 13, 2015	Mount Lemmon	Mount Lemmon Survey	T_{j} (2.99)	3.1 km	MPC · JPL
768718	2015 EY_{77}	—	March 15, 2015	Haleakala	Pan-STARRS 1	·	2.3 km	MPC · JPL
768719	2015 EH_{81}	—	March 15, 2015	Haleakala	Pan-STARRS 1	·	2.7 km	MPC · JPL
768720	2015 FL_{5}	—	December 30, 2014	Haleakala	Pan-STARRS 1	·	1.6 km	MPC · JPL
768721	2015 FP_{5}	—	December 26, 2014	Haleakala	Pan-STARRS 1	·	2.6 km	MPC · JPL
768722	2015 FX_{5}	—	September 10, 2007	Kitt Peak	Spacewatch	·	2.8 km	MPC · JPL
768723	2015 FZ_{5}	—	February 27, 2012	Haleakala	Pan-STARRS 1	·	480 m	MPC · JPL
768724	2015 FD_{9}	—	January 21, 2015	Haleakala	Pan-STARRS 1	EUN	850 m	MPC · JPL
768725	2015 FW_{11}	—	January 21, 2015	Haleakala	Pan-STARRS 1	·	2.2 km	MPC · JPL
768726	2015 FJ_{12}	—	March 17, 2015	Haleakala	Pan-STARRS 1	EOS	1.5 km	MPC · JPL
768727	2015 FP_{12}	—	March 16, 2015	Haleakala	Pan-STARRS 1	VER	2.0 km	MPC · JPL
768728	2015 FW_{12}	—	March 16, 2015	Haleakala	Pan-STARRS 1	VER	2.0 km	MPC · JPL
768729	2015 FO_{14}	—	December 30, 2013	Haleakala	Pan-STARRS 1	·	2.5 km	MPC · JPL
768730	2015 FV_{14}	—	December 25, 2013	Catalina	CSS	T_{j} (2.96)	2.2 km	MPC · JPL
768731	2015 FM_{15}	—	March 16, 2015	Haleakala	Pan-STARRS 1	·	2.2 km	MPC · JPL
768732	2015 FQ_{19}	—	March 16, 2015	Haleakala	Pan-STARRS 1	·	2.4 km	MPC · JPL
768733	2015 FO_{20}	—	May 21, 2011	Kitt Peak	Spacewatch	·	1.1 km	MPC · JPL
768734	2015 FJ_{21}	—	November 12, 2001	Apache Point	SDSS	·	2.2 km	MPC · JPL
768735	2015 FX_{21}	—	February 18, 2015	Haleakala	Pan-STARRS 1	EOS	1.4 km	MPC · JPL
768736	2015 FJ_{22}	—	March 16, 2015	Haleakala	Pan-STARRS 1	·	2.3 km	MPC · JPL
768737	2015 FS_{22}	—	January 1, 2014	Kitt Peak	Spacewatch	·	2.6 km	MPC · JPL
768738	2015 FJ_{23}	—	March 16, 2015	Haleakala	Pan-STARRS 1	·	2.5 km	MPC · JPL
768739	2015 FT_{23}	—	March 16, 2015	Haleakala	Pan-STARRS 1	·	2.8 km	MPC · JPL
768740	2015 FX_{25}	—	November 9, 2007	Mount Lemmon	Mount Lemmon Survey	URS	2.5 km	MPC · JPL
768741	2015 FY_{26}	—	March 16, 2015	Haleakala	Pan-STARRS 1	·	2.2 km	MPC · JPL
768742	2015 FG_{28}	—	March 16, 2015	Haleakala	Pan-STARRS 1	·	2.5 km	MPC · JPL
768743	2015 FZ_{28}	—	March 16, 2015	Haleakala	Pan-STARRS 1	EUP	2.8 km	MPC · JPL
768744	2015 FW_{32}	—	February 23, 2015	Haleakala	Pan-STARRS 1	·	2.0 km	MPC · JPL
768745	2015 FA_{33}	—	October 24, 2007	Mount Lemmon	Mount Lemmon Survey	·	2.5 km	MPC · JPL
768746	2015 FK_{34}	—	March 18, 2015	Haleakala	Pan-STARRS 1	H	300 m	MPC · JPL
768747	2015 FW_{38}	—	September 11, 2007	Kitt Peak	Spacewatch	·	2.0 km	MPC · JPL
768748	2015 FX_{38}	—	April 12, 2008	Kitt Peak	Spacewatch	·	500 m	MPC · JPL
768749	2015 FG_{44}	—	May 4, 2009	Mount Lemmon	Mount Lemmon Survey	(45637)	2.4 km	MPC · JPL
768750	2015 FB_{45}	—	December 11, 2013	Haleakala	Pan-STARRS 1	·	1.0 km	MPC · JPL
768751	2015 FP_{46}	—	January 20, 2015	Haleakala	Pan-STARRS 1	EOS	1.4 km	MPC · JPL
768752	2015 FK_{49}	—	February 16, 2015	Haleakala	Pan-STARRS 1	·	2.3 km	MPC · JPL
768753	2015 FK_{50}	—	April 5, 2011	Kitt Peak	Spacewatch	NEM	1.9 km	MPC · JPL
768754	2015 FD_{54}	—	January 24, 2015	Haleakala	Pan-STARRS 1	·	2.1 km	MPC · JPL
768755	2015 FQ_{54}	—	November 28, 2013	Mount Lemmon	Mount Lemmon Survey	·	2.6 km	MPC · JPL
768756	2015 FF_{56}	—	September 14, 2013	Mount Lemmon	Mount Lemmon Survey	·	2.3 km	MPC · JPL
768757	2015 FJ_{57}	—	January 22, 2015	Haleakala	Pan-STARRS 1	·	1.9 km	MPC · JPL
768758	2015 FQ_{57}	—	September 29, 2013	Piszkéstető	K. Sárneczky	THB	2.3 km	MPC · JPL
768759	2015 FU_{58}	—	October 12, 2007	Kitt Peak	Spacewatch	·	2.1 km	MPC · JPL
768760	2015 FS_{60}	—	January 26, 2015	Haleakala	Pan-STARRS 1	·	2.7 km	MPC · JPL
768761	2015 FJ_{66}	—	January 20, 2015	Haleakala	Pan-STARRS 1	·	1.6 km	MPC · JPL
768762	2015 FX_{66}	—	March 18, 2015	Haleakala	Pan-STARRS 1	·	2.1 km	MPC · JPL
768763	2015 FS_{68}	—	January 1, 2014	Haleakala	Pan-STARRS 1	·	2.2 km	MPC · JPL
768764	2015 FK_{69}	—	March 18, 2015	Haleakala	Pan-STARRS 1	TIR	2.2 km	MPC · JPL
768765	2015 FF_{70}	—	November 28, 2013	Mount Lemmon	Mount Lemmon Survey	·	2.4 km	MPC · JPL
768766	2015 FH_{70}	—	March 18, 2015	Haleakala	Pan-STARRS 1	H	420 m	MPC · JPL
768767	2015 FX_{70}	—	March 18, 2015	Haleakala	Pan-STARRS 1	L4	7.7 km	MPC · JPL
768768	2015 FO_{79}	—	October 3, 2013	Kitt Peak	Spacewatch	·	2.1 km	MPC · JPL
768769	2015 FE_{83}	—	November 28, 2013	Mount Lemmon	Mount Lemmon Survey	·	2.6 km	MPC · JPL
768770	2015 FT_{84}	—	October 23, 2013	Kitt Peak	Spacewatch	·	1.1 km	MPC · JPL
768771	2015 FM_{87}	—	November 10, 2013	Mount Lemmon	Mount Lemmon Survey	TEL	1.2 km	MPC · JPL
768772	2015 FW_{88}	—	February 25, 2015	Haleakala	Pan-STARRS 1	·	1.9 km	MPC · JPL
768773	2015 FD_{90}	—	October 11, 2012	Haleakala	Pan-STARRS 1	·	2.4 km	MPC · JPL
768774	2015 FL_{90}	—	February 24, 2015	Haleakala	Pan-STARRS 1	·	1.9 km	MPC · JPL
768775	2015 FD_{91}	—	September 10, 2013	Calar Alto	S. Hellmich, S. Mottola	·	700 m	MPC · JPL
768776	2015 FP_{93}	—	February 27, 2015	Haleakala	Pan-STARRS 1	·	2.1 km	MPC · JPL
768777	2015 FU_{93}	—	January 29, 2009	Kitt Peak	Spacewatch	·	2.0 km	MPC · JPL
768778	2015 FV_{93}	—	January 22, 2015	Haleakala	Pan-STARRS 1	EOS	1.2 km	MPC · JPL
768779	2015 FN_{95}	—	January 22, 2015	Haleakala	Pan-STARRS 1	·	2.2 km	MPC · JPL
768780	2015 FH_{98}	—	March 20, 2015	Haleakala	Pan-STARRS 1	·	2.1 km	MPC · JPL
768781	2015 FJ_{99}	—	March 25, 2011	Haleakala	Pan-STARRS 1	·	740 m	MPC · JPL
768782	2015 FV_{100}	—	November 3, 2012	Mount Lemmon	Mount Lemmon Survey	EOS	1.6 km	MPC · JPL
768783	2015 FO_{102}	—	January 22, 2015	Haleakala	Pan-STARRS 1	·	2.4 km	MPC · JPL
768784	2015 FX_{103}	—	January 22, 2015	Haleakala	Pan-STARRS 1	·	2.6 km	MPC · JPL
768785	2015 FB_{104}	—	January 22, 2015	Haleakala	Pan-STARRS 1	·	2.5 km	MPC · JPL
768786	2015 FF_{105}	—	January 26, 2011	Mount Lemmon	Mount Lemmon Survey	·	680 m	MPC · JPL
768787	2015 FZ_{106}	—	October 8, 2007	Mount Lemmon	Mount Lemmon Survey	·	2.0 km	MPC · JPL
768788	2015 FF_{111}	—	March 20, 2015	Haleakala	Pan-STARRS 1	L4	7.1 km	MPC · JPL
768789	2015 FC_{112}	—	March 20, 2015	Haleakala	Pan-STARRS 1	·	2.0 km	MPC · JPL
768790	2015 FE_{113}	—	January 20, 2015	Haleakala	Pan-STARRS 1	·	2.8 km	MPC · JPL
768791	2015 FH_{113}	—	January 18, 2009	Kitt Peak	Spacewatch	·	1.9 km	MPC · JPL
768792	2015 FG_{114}	—	April 13, 2004	Kitt Peak	Spacewatch	·	1.8 km	MPC · JPL
768793	2015 FV_{114}	—	January 25, 2015	Haleakala	Pan-STARRS 1	·	770 m	MPC · JPL
768794	2015 FM_{115}	—	March 18, 2004	Kitt Peak	Spacewatch	NYS	850 m	MPC · JPL
768795	2015 FA_{116}	—	February 16, 2015	Haleakala	Pan-STARRS 1	·	2.7 km	MPC · JPL
768796	2015 FC_{124}	—	January 19, 2015	Haleakala	Pan-STARRS 1	·	2.6 km	MPC · JPL
768797	2015 FN_{126}	—	November 9, 2013	Mount Lemmon	Mount Lemmon Survey	·	2.2 km	MPC · JPL
768798	2015 FS_{129}	—	October 2, 2013	Haleakala	Pan-STARRS 1	·	2.1 km	MPC · JPL
768799	2015 FM_{130}	—	November 26, 2008	La Sagra	OAM	·	2.4 km	MPC · JPL
768800	2015 FZ_{132}	—	November 9, 2013	Mount Lemmon	Mount Lemmon Survey	·	2.3 km	MPC · JPL

== 768801–768900 ==
back to top

Designation			Discovery			Properties		Ref
Permanent	Provisional	Named after	Date	Site	Discoverer(s)	Category	Diam.	Ref
768801	2015 FC_{136}	—	February 25, 2015	Haleakala	Pan-STARRS 1	·	1.6 km	MPC · JPL
768802	2015 FC_{137}	—	January 30, 2011	Kitt Peak	Spacewatch	MAS	570 m	MPC · JPL
768803	2015 FZ_{139}	—	April 15, 2010	Mount Lemmon	Mount Lemmon Survey	·	1.6 km	MPC · JPL
768804	2015 FQ_{140}	—	January 23, 2015	Haleakala	Pan-STARRS 1	·	1.3 km	MPC · JPL
768805	2015 FJ_{141}	—	September 17, 2012	Kitt Peak	Spacewatch	·	1.2 km	MPC · JPL
768806	2015 FG_{145}	—	September 24, 2013	Mount Lemmon	Mount Lemmon Survey	·	520 m	MPC · JPL
768807	2015 FC_{147}	—	October 17, 2012	Haleakala	Pan-STARRS 1	·	1.9 km	MPC · JPL
768808	2015 FD_{149}	—	March 21, 2015	Haleakala	Pan-STARRS 1	·	2.6 km	MPC · JPL
768809	2015 FT_{150}	—	January 13, 2008	Kitt Peak	Spacewatch	·	530 m	MPC · JPL
768810	2015 FM_{152}	—	September 26, 2006	Mount Lemmon	Mount Lemmon Survey	·	2.0 km	MPC · JPL
768811	2015 FR_{152}	—	January 23, 2015	Haleakala	Pan-STARRS 1	·	2.1 km	MPC · JPL
768812	2015 FQ_{153}	—	November 8, 2007	Mount Lemmon	Mount Lemmon Survey	HYG	2.0 km	MPC · JPL
768813	2015 FO_{155}	—	March 17, 2015	Kitt Peak	Spacewatch	NYS	970 m	MPC · JPL
768814	2015 FJ_{156}	—	March 21, 2015	Haleakala	Pan-STARRS 1	·	1.5 km	MPC · JPL
768815	2015 FO_{157}	—	March 21, 2015	Haleakala	Pan-STARRS 1	·	2.1 km	MPC · JPL
768816	2015 FB_{161}	—	March 10, 2008	Kitt Peak	Spacewatch	·	630 m	MPC · JPL
768817	2015 FA_{162}	—	March 21, 2015	Haleakala	Pan-STARRS 1	·	2.6 km	MPC · JPL
768818	2015 FN_{164}	—	March 21, 2015	Haleakala	Pan-STARRS 1	·	1.1 km	MPC · JPL
768819	2015 FA_{166}	—	December 1, 2003	Kitt Peak	Spacewatch	·	440 m	MPC · JPL
768820	2015 FF_{170}	—	November 11, 2013	Kitt Peak	Spacewatch	·	1.5 km	MPC · JPL
768821	2015 FW_{170}	—	March 21, 2015	Haleakala	Pan-STARRS 1	THM	1.8 km	MPC · JPL
768822	2015 FY_{170}	—	March 21, 2015	Haleakala	Pan-STARRS 1	·	2.2 km	MPC · JPL
768823	2015 FU_{171}	—	March 21, 2015	Haleakala	Pan-STARRS 1	·	2.4 km	MPC · JPL
768824	2015 FB_{172}	—	March 21, 2015	Haleakala	Pan-STARRS 1	L4	5.9 km	MPC · JPL
768825	2015 FQ_{177}	—	January 3, 2014	Kitt Peak	Spacewatch	·	2.3 km	MPC · JPL
768826	2015 FD_{182}	—	October 31, 2007	Mount Lemmon	Mount Lemmon Survey	·	2.2 km	MPC · JPL
768827	2015 FP_{182}	—	October 13, 2007	Mount Lemmon	Mount Lemmon Survey	·	1.7 km	MPC · JPL
768828	2015 FB_{183}	—	January 2, 2011	Mount Lemmon	Mount Lemmon Survey	·	600 m	MPC · JPL
768829	2015 FP_{186}	—	October 3, 2013	Kitt Peak	Spacewatch	·	2.0 km	MPC · JPL
768830	2015 FS_{186}	—	March 22, 2015	Mount Lemmon	Mount Lemmon Survey	·	500 m	MPC · JPL
768831	2015 FJ_{190}	—	January 18, 2015	Haleakala	Pan-STARRS 1	·	890 m	MPC · JPL
768832	2015 FU_{190}	—	January 18, 2015	Haleakala	Pan-STARRS 1	·	2.4 km	MPC · JPL
768833	2015 FK_{191}	—	January 23, 2015	Haleakala	Pan-STARRS 1	·	970 m	MPC · JPL
768834	2015 FY_{191}	—	January 20, 2015	Haleakala	Pan-STARRS 1	·	2.6 km	MPC · JPL
768835	2015 FV_{195}	—	February 24, 2015	Haleakala	Pan-STARRS 1	·	760 m	MPC · JPL
768836	2015 FF_{196}	—	January 23, 2015	Haleakala	Pan-STARRS 1	·	2.0 km	MPC · JPL
768837	2015 FP_{197}	—	January 23, 2015	Haleakala	Pan-STARRS 1	·	550 m	MPC · JPL
768838	2015 FB_{198}	—	November 2, 2007	Mount Lemmon	Mount Lemmon Survey	·	2.3 km	MPC · JPL
768839	2015 FQ_{198}	—	September 25, 2012	Kitt Peak	Spacewatch	EOS	1.6 km	MPC · JPL
768840	2015 FM_{199}	—	September 29, 2009	Mount Lemmon	Mount Lemmon Survey	·	930 m	MPC · JPL
768841	2015 FY_{199}	—	November 25, 2006	Kitt Peak	Spacewatch	·	730 m	MPC · JPL
768842	2015 FZ_{202}	—	February 22, 2009	Kitt Peak	Spacewatch	VER	2.0 km	MPC · JPL
768843	2015 FN_{204}	—	January 25, 2015	Haleakala	Pan-STARRS 1	·	1.1 km	MPC · JPL
768844	2015 FW_{204}	—	March 22, 2015	Haleakala	Pan-STARRS 1	·	2.2 km	MPC · JPL
768845	2015 FA_{205}	—	January 22, 2015	Haleakala	Pan-STARRS 1	·	1.9 km	MPC · JPL
768846	2015 FL_{207}	—	March 26, 2008	Mount Lemmon	Mount Lemmon Survey	·	770 m	MPC · JPL
768847	2015 FV_{210}	—	January 23, 2015	Haleakala	Pan-STARRS 1	·	990 m	MPC · JPL
768848	2015 FJ_{211}	—	February 28, 2009	Kitt Peak	Spacewatch	·	2.4 km	MPC · JPL
768849	2015 FC_{215}	—	October 29, 2006	Kitt Peak	Spacewatch	·	690 m	MPC · JPL
768850	2015 FC_{218}	—	December 17, 2003	Kitt Peak	Spacewatch	·	500 m	MPC · JPL
768851	2015 FF_{218}	—	October 1, 2013	Mount Lemmon	Mount Lemmon Survey	·	880 m	MPC · JPL
768852	2015 FE_{221}	—	February 18, 2015	Haleakala	Pan-STARRS 1	·	500 m	MPC · JPL
768853	2015 FR_{223}	—	February 5, 2009	Kitt Peak	Spacewatch	·	2.2 km	MPC · JPL
768854	2015 FX_{226}	—	October 1, 2013	Kitt Peak	Spacewatch	·	670 m	MPC · JPL
768855	2015 FD_{232}	—	February 13, 2008	Kitt Peak	Spacewatch	·	480 m	MPC · JPL
768856	2015 FN_{235}	—	February 28, 2008	Mount Lemmon	Mount Lemmon Survey	·	510 m	MPC · JPL
768857	2015 FT_{238}	—	October 17, 2012	Haleakala	Pan-STARRS 1	·	2.3 km	MPC · JPL
768858	2015 FO_{240}	—	March 23, 2015	Haleakala	Pan-STARRS 1	·	2.0 km	MPC · JPL
768859	2015 FK_{241}	—	February 1, 2009	Kitt Peak	Spacewatch	VER	1.9 km	MPC · JPL
768860	2015 FA_{242}	—	January 1, 2009	Kitt Peak	Spacewatch	·	1.8 km	MPC · JPL
768861	2015 FQ_{242}	—	January 17, 2009	Mount Lemmon	Mount Lemmon Survey	·	1.9 km	MPC · JPL
768862	2015 FR_{245}	—	October 23, 2013	Kitt Peak	Spacewatch	·	950 m	MPC · JPL
768863	2015 FT_{245}	—	March 23, 2015	Haleakala	Pan-STARRS 1	·	1.0 km	MPC · JPL
768864	2015 FU_{245}	—	March 23, 2015	Haleakala	Pan-STARRS 1	EOS	1.4 km	MPC · JPL
768865	2015 FD_{246}	—	March 23, 2015	Haleakala	Pan-STARRS 1	·	2.0 km	MPC · JPL
768866	2015 FP_{246}	—	November 4, 2007	Kitt Peak	Spacewatch	·	2.2 km	MPC · JPL
768867	2015 FF_{253}	—	March 16, 2015	Mount Lemmon	Mount Lemmon Survey	·	1.5 km	MPC · JPL
768868	2015 FS_{254}	—	November 9, 2007	Mount Lemmon	Mount Lemmon Survey	·	2.3 km	MPC · JPL
768869	2015 FU_{254}	—	October 23, 2012	Mount Lemmon	Mount Lemmon Survey	·	2.3 km	MPC · JPL
768870	2015 FZ_{254}	—	October 22, 2006	Kitt Peak	Spacewatch	MAS	470 m	MPC · JPL
768871	2015 FD_{255}	—	February 27, 2015	Haleakala	Pan-STARRS 1	·	1.5 km	MPC · JPL
768872	2015 FZ_{255}	—	February 5, 2011	Haleakala	Pan-STARRS 1	PHO	560 m	MPC · JPL
768873	2015 FP_{257}	—	March 23, 2015	Haleakala	Pan-STARRS 1	·	2.4 km	MPC · JPL
768874	2015 FW_{260}	—	March 29, 2008	Kitt Peak	Spacewatch	·	810 m	MPC · JPL
768875	2015 FX_{260}	—	February 17, 2015	Haleakala	Pan-STARRS 1	NYS	890 m	MPC · JPL
768876	2015 FK_{264}	—	December 31, 2013	Kitt Peak	Spacewatch	·	2.1 km	MPC · JPL
768877	2015 FZ_{266}	—	October 8, 2012	Mount Lemmon	Mount Lemmon Survey	·	2.1 km	MPC · JPL
768878	2015 FY_{267}	—	February 16, 2015	Haleakala	Pan-STARRS 1	·	1.3 km	MPC · JPL
768879	2015 FC_{269}	—	December 29, 2014	Haleakala	Pan-STARRS 1	·	2.3 km	MPC · JPL
768880	2015 FS_{269}	—	October 1, 2006	Kitt Peak	Spacewatch	·	670 m	MPC · JPL
768881	2015 FC_{270}	—	February 19, 2015	Haleakala	Pan-STARRS 1	·	560 m	MPC · JPL
768882	2015 FO_{272}	—	March 24, 2015	Haleakala	Pan-STARRS 1	·	1.4 km	MPC · JPL
768883	2015 FW_{272}	—	February 18, 2008	Mount Lemmon	Mount Lemmon Survey	·	700 m	MPC · JPL
768884	2015 FG_{274}	—	March 24, 2015	Haleakala	Pan-STARRS 1	VER	1.9 km	MPC · JPL
768885	2015 FS_{275}	—	October 2, 2006	Mount Lemmon	Mount Lemmon Survey	·	2.5 km	MPC · JPL
768886	2015 FC_{278}	—	September 11, 2007	Mount Lemmon	Mount Lemmon Survey	EOS	1.5 km	MPC · JPL
768887	2015 FU_{282}	—	January 21, 2015	Haleakala	Pan-STARRS 1	·	740 m	MPC · JPL
768888	2015 FX_{283}	—	March 24, 2015	Haleakala	Pan-STARRS 1	LUT	3.6 km	MPC · JPL
768889	2015 FH_{288}	—	November 20, 2007	Mount Lemmon	Mount Lemmon Survey	·	2.4 km	MPC · JPL
768890	2015 FN_{290}	—	March 25, 2015	Haleakala	Pan-STARRS 1	H	410 m	MPC · JPL
768891	2015 FM_{291}	—	July 11, 2010	WISE	WISE	·	1.9 km	MPC · JPL
768892	2015 FY_{291}	—	April 11, 2010	Kitt Peak	Spacewatch	·	2.5 km	MPC · JPL
768893	2015 FC_{296}	—	March 28, 2015	Haleakala	Pan-STARRS 1	·	1.1 km	MPC · JPL
768894	2015 FV_{297}	—	January 22, 2015	Haleakala	Pan-STARRS 1	·	2.3 km	MPC · JPL
768895	2015 FW_{308}	—	March 25, 2015	Haleakala	Pan-STARRS 1	·	2.9 km	MPC · JPL
768896	2015 FF_{311}	—	March 22, 2015	Kitt Peak	Spacewatch	·	2.1 km	MPC · JPL
768897	2015 FL_{311}	—	September 30, 2013	Calar Alto-CASADO	Mottola, S., Proffe, G.	·	750 m	MPC · JPL
768898	2015 FC_{312}	—	December 31, 2007	Mount Lemmon	Mount Lemmon Survey	·	520 m	MPC · JPL
768899	2015 FK_{313}	—	March 25, 2015	Haleakala	Pan-STARRS 1	·	560 m	MPC · JPL
768900	2015 FU_{313}	—	December 24, 2013	Mount Lemmon	Mount Lemmon Survey	·	2.0 km	MPC · JPL

== 768901–769000 ==
back to top

Designation			Discovery			Properties		Ref
Permanent	Provisional	Named after	Date	Site	Discoverer(s)	Category	Diam.	Ref
768901	2015 FP_{318}	—	November 9, 2013	Mount Lemmon	Mount Lemmon Survey	V	390 m	MPC · JPL
768902	2015 FK_{319}	—	March 25, 2015	Haleakala	Pan-STARRS 1	V	440 m	MPC · JPL
768903	2015 FW_{319}	—	January 24, 2014	Haleakala	Pan-STARRS 1	VER	2.3 km	MPC · JPL
768904	2015 FC_{322}	—	March 16, 2015	Haleakala	Pan-STARRS 1	·	2.3 km	MPC · JPL
768905	2015 FL_{326}	—	March 25, 2015	Haleakala	Pan-STARRS 1	·	2.1 km	MPC · JPL
768906	2015 FN_{327}	—	December 14, 2010	Westfield	International Astronomical Search Collaboration	·	570 m	MPC · JPL
768907	2015 FE_{330}	—	January 23, 2015	Haleakala	Pan-STARRS 1	·	610 m	MPC · JPL
768908	2015 FF_{330}	—	October 25, 2013	Mount Lemmon	Mount Lemmon Survey	EUN	880 m	MPC · JPL
768909	2015 FY_{330}	—	January 20, 2015	Haleakala	Pan-STARRS 1	(1118)	2.3 km	MPC · JPL
768910	2015 FP_{333}	—	February 3, 2011	Bisei	BATTeRS	MAS	620 m	MPC · JPL
768911	2015 FT_{336}	—	November 26, 2013	Mount Lemmon	Mount Lemmon Survey	H	370 m	MPC · JPL
768912	2015 FA_{346}	—	September 23, 2011	Kitt Peak	Spacewatch	H	310 m	MPC · JPL
768913	2015 FB_{346}	—	October 5, 2013	Haleakala	Pan-STARRS 1	·	2.2 km	MPC · JPL
768914	2015 FU_{346}	—	February 9, 2015	Mount Lemmon	Mount Lemmon Survey	·	2.1 km	MPC · JPL
768915	2015 FA_{347}	—	January 22, 2015	Haleakala	Pan-STARRS 1	·	2.1 km	MPC · JPL
768916	2015 FD_{347}	—	August 10, 2007	Kitt Peak	Spacewatch	·	1.6 km	MPC · JPL
768917	2015 FO_{349}	—	February 8, 2013	Mount Lemmon	Mount Lemmon Survey	L4	7.9 km	MPC · JPL
768918	2015 FT_{349}	—	November 9, 2013	Haleakala	Pan-STARRS 1	·	770 m	MPC · JPL
768919	2015 FE_{350}	—	March 16, 2015	Haleakala	Pan-STARRS 1	·	3.0 km	MPC · JPL
768920	2015 FN_{350}	—	November 30, 2011	Kitt Peak	Spacewatch	L4	7.3 km	MPC · JPL
768921	2015 FY_{350}	—	December 27, 2013	Kitt Peak	Spacewatch	·	2.5 km	MPC · JPL
768922	2015 FS_{351}	—	February 27, 2015	Mount Lemmon	Mount Lemmon Survey	·	2.4 km	MPC · JPL
768923	2015 FE_{356}	—	March 17, 2015	Haleakala	Pan-STARRS 1	H	360 m	MPC · JPL
768924	2015 FX_{357}	—	March 17, 2015	Haleakala	Pan-STARRS 1	·	1.7 km	MPC · JPL
768925	2015 FG_{358}	—	March 17, 2015	Haleakala	Pan-STARRS 1	·	2.1 km	MPC · JPL
768926	2015 FJ_{361}	—	March 17, 2015	Haleakala	Pan-STARRS 1	·	940 m	MPC · JPL
768927	2015 FU_{364}	—	March 18, 2015	Haleakala	Pan-STARRS 1	H	370 m	MPC · JPL
768928	2015 FC_{365}	—	January 22, 2015	Haleakala	Pan-STARRS 1	T_{j} (2.94)	2.8 km	MPC · JPL
768929	2015 FQ_{367}	—	February 20, 2015	Haleakala	Pan-STARRS 1	·	1.9 km	MPC · JPL
768930	2015 FS_{370}	—	February 13, 2002	Apache Point	SDSS	L4	6.5 km	MPC · JPL
768931	2015 FU_{370}	—	January 28, 2015	Haleakala	Pan-STARRS 1	L4	7.4 km	MPC · JPL
768932	2015 FT_{371}	—	March 18, 2015	Haleakala	Pan-STARRS 1	L4	6.2 km	MPC · JPL
768933	2015 FK_{373}	—	March 18, 2015	Haleakala	Pan-STARRS 1	PHO	680 m	MPC · JPL
768934	2015 FT_{373}	—	March 18, 2015	Haleakala	Pan-STARRS 1	L4	8.1 km	MPC · JPL
768935	2015 FM_{379}	—	August 24, 2012	Kitt Peak	Spacewatch	·	2.3 km	MPC · JPL
768936	2015 FO_{379}	—	February 20, 2015	Haleakala	Pan-STARRS 1	VER	1.9 km	MPC · JPL
768937	2015 FA_{381}	—	March 20, 2015	Haleakala	Pan-STARRS 1	·	2.5 km	MPC · JPL
768938	2015 FF_{381}	—	November 28, 2013	Mount Lemmon	Mount Lemmon Survey	·	2.4 km	MPC · JPL
768939	2015 FD_{386}	—	October 24, 2013	Mount Lemmon	Mount Lemmon Survey	·	2.3 km	MPC · JPL
768940	2015 FA_{389}	—	January 23, 2011	Mount Lemmon	Mount Lemmon Survey	·	710 m	MPC · JPL
768941	2015 FV_{392}	—	February 20, 2009	Kitt Peak	Spacewatch	·	2.3 km	MPC · JPL
768942	2015 FT_{393}	—	March 29, 2015	Mount Lemmon	Mount Lemmon Survey	H	400 m	MPC · JPL
768943	2015 FX_{393}	—	October 1, 2005	Kitt Peak	Spacewatch	H	370 m	MPC · JPL
768944	2015 FN_{395}	—	March 28, 2009	Catalina	CSS	·	2.4 km	MPC · JPL
768945	2015 FK_{396}	—	March 30, 2015	Haleakala	Pan-STARRS 1	·	760 m	MPC · JPL
768946	2015 FN_{396}	—	March 19, 2007	Mount Lemmon	Mount Lemmon Survey	·	1.2 km	MPC · JPL
768947	2015 FB_{402}	—	October 7, 2007	Mount Lemmon	Mount Lemmon Survey	·	1.6 km	MPC · JPL
768948	2015 FR_{404}	—	February 8, 2011	Mount Lemmon	Mount Lemmon Survey	·	940 m	MPC · JPL
768949	2015 FF_{406}	—	October 23, 2013	Mount Lemmon	Mount Lemmon Survey	·	880 m	MPC · JPL
768950	2015 FB_{407}	—	December 22, 2008	Kitt Peak	Spacewatch	EOS	1.3 km	MPC · JPL
768951	2015 FT_{409}	—	March 22, 2015	Haleakala	Pan-STARRS 1	TIR	2.6 km	MPC · JPL
768952	2015 FE_{412}	—	March 28, 2015	Haleakala	Pan-STARRS 1	·	750 m	MPC · JPL
768953	2015 FR_{413}	—	March 30, 2015	Haleakala	Pan-STARRS 1	·	1.9 km	MPC · JPL
768954	2015 FY_{415}	—	March 20, 2015	Haleakala	Pan-STARRS 1	PHO	580 m	MPC · JPL
768955	2015 FE_{416}	—	March 28, 2015	Haleakala	Pan-STARRS 1	PHO	690 m	MPC · JPL
768956	2015 FN_{416}	—	March 21, 2015	Haleakala	Pan-STARRS 1	·	560 m	MPC · JPL
768957	2015 FT_{422}	—	March 16, 2015	Mount Lemmon	Mount Lemmon Survey	·	1.6 km	MPC · JPL
768958	2015 FU_{425}	—	September 19, 2012	Mount Lemmon	Mount Lemmon Survey	·	2.4 km	MPC · JPL
768959	2015 FP_{426}	—	March 17, 2015	Mount Lemmon	Mount Lemmon Survey	·	1.0 km	MPC · JPL
768960	2015 FV_{427}	—	March 28, 2015	Haleakala	Pan-STARRS 1	·	2.5 km	MPC · JPL
768961	2015 FJ_{428}	—	March 28, 2015	Haleakala	Pan-STARRS 1	URS	2.7 km	MPC · JPL
768962	2015 FZ_{433}	—	March 17, 2015	Haleakala	Pan-STARRS 1	·	2.1 km	MPC · JPL
768963	2015 FL_{436}	—	March 17, 2015	Haleakala	Pan-STARRS 1	·	1.4 km	MPC · JPL
768964	2015 FT_{436}	—	March 25, 2015	Haleakala	Pan-STARRS 1	·	2.2 km	MPC · JPL
768965	2015 FF_{438}	—	March 27, 2015	Haleakala	Pan-STARRS 1	L4	6.6 km	MPC · JPL
768966	2015 FX_{438}	—	March 30, 2015	Haleakala	Pan-STARRS 1	·	3.0 km	MPC · JPL
768967	2015 FO_{439}	—	March 22, 2015	Mount Lemmon	Mount Lemmon Survey	·	820 m	MPC · JPL
768968	2015 FT_{439}	—	March 17, 2015	Haleakala	Pan-STARRS 1	·	520 m	MPC · JPL
768969	2015 FQ_{440}	—	March 25, 2015	Haleakala	Pan-STARRS 1	·	2.9 km	MPC · JPL
768970	2015 FV_{442}	—	January 31, 2015	Haleakala	Pan-STARRS 1	·	3.0 km	MPC · JPL
768971	2015 FD_{443}	—	March 21, 2015	Cerro Paranal	Gaia Ground Based Optical Tracking	·	2.4 km	MPC · JPL
768972	2015 FL_{443}	—	March 16, 2015	Haleakala	Pan-STARRS 1	·	2.1 km	MPC · JPL
768973	2015 FJ_{445}	—	March 16, 2015	Haleakala	Pan-STARRS 1	·	2.3 km	MPC · JPL
768974	2015 FQ_{445}	—	March 25, 2015	Haleakala	Pan-STARRS 1	·	2.7 km	MPC · JPL
768975	2015 FS_{445}	—	March 25, 2015	Haleakala	Pan-STARRS 1	·	2.6 km	MPC · JPL
768976	2015 FZ_{446}	—	January 23, 2015	Haleakala	Pan-STARRS 1	L4	6.4 km	MPC · JPL
768977	2015 FC_{447}	—	January 22, 2015	Haleakala	Pan-STARRS 1	EOS	1.3 km	MPC · JPL
768978	2015 FQ_{447}	—	March 22, 2015	Haleakala	Pan-STARRS 1	·	2.0 km	MPC · JPL
768979	2015 FX_{450}	—	September 18, 2010	Mount Lemmon	Mount Lemmon Survey	L4	7.1 km	MPC · JPL
768980	2015 FD_{453}	—	March 17, 2015	Mount Lemmon	Mount Lemmon Survey	·	1.1 km	MPC · JPL
768981	2015 FL_{453}	—	March 22, 2015	Mount Lemmon	Mount Lemmon Survey	L4	5.9 km	MPC · JPL
768982	2015 FR_{453}	—	May 28, 2008	Mount Lemmon	Mount Lemmon Survey	·	780 m	MPC · JPL
768983	2015 FC_{455}	—	March 17, 2015	Mount Lemmon	Mount Lemmon Survey	·	1.7 km	MPC · JPL
768984	2015 FT_{459}	—	March 22, 2015	Haleakala	Pan-STARRS 1	L4	5.8 km	MPC · JPL
768985	2015 FS_{465}	—	February 22, 2009	Kitt Peak	Spacewatch	HYG	2.0 km	MPC · JPL
768986	2015 FU_{465}	—	March 22, 2015	Haleakala	Pan-STARRS 1	THM	1.8 km	MPC · JPL
768987	2015 FB_{466}	—	March 25, 2015	Haleakala	Pan-STARRS 1	·	1.9 km	MPC · JPL
768988	2015 FK_{467}	—	March 21, 2015	Haleakala	Pan-STARRS 1	KOR	1.1 km	MPC · JPL
768989	2015 FT_{471}	—	September 23, 2012	Mount Lemmon	Mount Lemmon Survey	·	2.2 km	MPC · JPL
768990	2015 FD_{472}	—	March 21, 2015	Haleakala	Pan-STARRS 1	EOS	1.4 km	MPC · JPL
768991	2015 GG_{5}	—	July 6, 2005	Kitt Peak	Spacewatch	·	510 m	MPC · JPL
768992	2015 GG_{7}	—	May 12, 2007	Kitt Peak	Spacewatch	·	1 km	MPC · JPL
768993	2015 GJ_{12}	—	January 18, 2009	Catalina	CSS	·	3.1 km	MPC · JPL
768994	2015 GP_{12}	—	January 1, 2014	Haleakala	Pan-STARRS 1	·	3.1 km	MPC · JPL
768995	2015 GN_{14}	—	October 23, 2006	Kitt Peak	Spacewatch	·	660 m	MPC · JPL
768996	2015 GM_{17}	—	March 24, 2015	Mount Lemmon	Mount Lemmon Survey	·	920 m	MPC · JPL
768997	2015 GQ_{17}	—	February 16, 2015	Haleakala	Pan-STARRS 1	·	2.1 km	MPC · JPL
768998	2015 GF_{18}	—	December 23, 2012	Haleakala	Pan-STARRS 1	L4	6.3 km	MPC · JPL
768999	2015 GX_{18}	—	October 5, 2013	Haleakala	Pan-STARRS 1	·	670 m	MPC · JPL
769000	2015 GK_{22}	—	February 17, 2004	Kitt Peak	Spacewatch	·	1.8 km	MPC · JPL

== Meaning of names ==
As minor planet discoveries are confirmed, they are given a permanent number by the IAU's Minor Planet Center (MPC), and the discoverers can then submit names for them, following the IAU's naming conventions. The list below concerns those minor planets in the specified number-range that have received names, and explains the meanings of those names.

Official naming citations of newly named small Solar System bodies are approved and published in a bulletin by IAU's Working Group for Small Bodies Nomenclature (WGSBN). Before May 2021, citations were published in MPC's Minor Planet Circulars for many decades. Recent citations can also be found on the JPL Small-Body Database (SBDB). Until his death in 2016, German astronomer Lutz D. Schmadel compiled these citations into the Dictionary of Minor Planet Names (DMP) and regularly updated the collection.

Based on Paul Herget's The Names of the Minor Planets, Schmadel also researched the unclear origin of numerous asteroids, most of which had been named prior to World War II. This article incorporates text from this source, which is in the public domain: SBDB New namings may only be added to this list below after official publication as the preannouncement of names is condemned. The WGSBN publishes a comprehensive guideline for the naming rules of non-cometary small Solar System bodies.

Named minor planet	Provisional	This minor planet was named for...	Ref · Catalog
768325 Geyagugv	2015 BP_{519}	Geyagugv (ᎨᏯᎫᎬ), a Cherokee metaphysical being and messenger between the Cherokee people and the Creator residing in galvnati (ᎦᎸᎾᏘ), the sky-vault.	IAU · 768325
768693 Șuran	2015 EJ_{55}	Marian Doru Șuran, Romanian astronomer and a former director of the Astronomical Institute of the Romanian Academy.	IAU · 768693
