= List of minor planets: 761001–762000 =

The following is a partial list of minor planets, running from minor-planet number 761001 through 762000, inclusive. The primary data for this and other partial lists is based on JPL's "Small-Body Orbital Elements" and data available from the Minor Planet Center. Critical list information is also provided by the MPC, unless otherwise specified from Lowell Observatory. A detailed description of the table's columns and additional sources are given on the main page including a complete list of every page in this series, and a statistical break-up on the dynamical classification of minor planets.

Also see the summary list of all named bodies in numerical and alphabetical order, and the corresponding naming citations for the number range of this particular list. New namings may only be added to this list after official publication, as the preannouncement of names is condemned by the Working Group for Small Bodies Nomenclature of the International Astronomical Union.

Near-Earth obj.	MBA (inner)	MBA (outer)	Centaur
Mars-crosser	MBA (middle)	Jupiter trojan	Trans-Neptunian obj.
Unclassified

== 761001–761100 ==
Designation			Discovery			Properties		Ref
Permanent	Provisional	Named after	Date	Site	Discoverer(s)	Category	Diam.	Ref
761001	2009 ER_{38}	—	March 3, 2009	Kitt Peak	Spacewatch	HYG	2.0 km	MPC · JPL
761002	2009 EP_{39}	—	March 2, 2009	Mount Lemmon	Mount Lemmon Survey	·	2.3 km	MPC · JPL
761003	2009 EZ_{40}	—	March 3, 2009	Mount Lemmon	Mount Lemmon Survey	·	2.7 km	MPC · JPL
761004	2009 EG_{41}	—	March 1, 2009	Mount Lemmon	Mount Lemmon Survey	·	2.5 km	MPC · JPL
761005	2009 EJ_{41}	—	March 1, 2009	Kitt Peak	Spacewatch	·	1.2 km	MPC · JPL
761006	2009 EQ_{41}	—	March 3, 2009	Mount Lemmon	Mount Lemmon Survey	·	1.7 km	MPC · JPL
761007	2009 ER_{41}	—	March 3, 2009	Mount Lemmon	Mount Lemmon Survey	·	1.3 km	MPC · JPL
761008	2009 EL_{42}	—	March 1, 2009	Kitt Peak	Spacewatch	·	1.9 km	MPC · JPL
761009	2009 EQ_{42}	—	March 3, 2009	Kitt Peak	Spacewatch	·	2.0 km	MPC · JPL
761010	2009 EC_{43}	—	March 2, 2009	Kitt Peak	Spacewatch	·	2.3 km	MPC · JPL
761011	2009 FB_{8}	—	March 16, 2009	Kitt Peak	Spacewatch	·	590 m	MPC · JPL
761012	2009 FM_{15}	—	February 13, 2009	Kitt Peak	Spacewatch	JUN	1.0 km	MPC · JPL
761013	2009 FW_{20}	—	September 14, 2007	Kitt Peak	Spacewatch	·	2.0 km	MPC · JPL
761014	2009 FP_{35}	—	March 22, 2009	Mount Lemmon	Mount Lemmon Survey	·	630 m	MPC · JPL
761015	2009 FG_{40}	—	March 2, 2009	Mount Lemmon	Mount Lemmon Survey	·	2.4 km	MPC · JPL
761016	2009 FD_{41}	—	February 28, 2009	Mount Lemmon	Mount Lemmon Survey	·	2.1 km	MPC · JPL
761017	2009 FH_{46}	—	March 23, 2009	XuYi	PMO NEO Survey Program	·	2.4 km	MPC · JPL
761018	2009 FU_{55}	—	February 26, 2009	Catalina	CSS	·	2.7 km	MPC · JPL
761019	2009 FN_{59}	—	April 19, 2009	Mount Lemmon	Mount Lemmon Survey	EUN	960 m	MPC · JPL
761020	2009 FE_{60}	—	December 16, 2007	Kitt Peak	Spacewatch	·	2.1 km	MPC · JPL
761021	2009 FO_{63}	—	April 10, 2000	Kitt Peak	M. W. Buie	·	1.3 km	MPC · JPL
761022	2009 FL_{66}	—	March 21, 2009	Mount Lemmon	Mount Lemmon Survey	(29841)	1.2 km	MPC · JPL
761023	2009 FM_{70}	—	March 19, 2009	Mount Lemmon	Mount Lemmon Survey	·	2.4 km	MPC · JPL
761024	2009 FP_{81}	—	March 29, 2009	Mount Lemmon	Mount Lemmon Survey	·	780 m	MPC · JPL
761025	2009 FP_{82}	—	March 31, 2009	Mount Lemmon	Mount Lemmon Survey	·	590 m	MPC · JPL
761026	2009 FX_{82}	—	March 19, 2009	Kitt Peak	Spacewatch	·	1.6 km	MPC · JPL
761027	2009 FE_{84}	—	January 22, 2015	Haleakala	Pan-STARRS 1	·	2.3 km	MPC · JPL
761028	2009 FV_{84}	—	March 19, 2009	Mount Lemmon	Mount Lemmon Survey	JUN	1.0 km	MPC · JPL
761029	2009 FL_{86}	—	September 9, 2015	Haleakala	Pan-STARRS 1	MAR	870 m	MPC · JPL
761030	2009 FF_{87}	—	March 31, 2009	Kitt Peak	Spacewatch	·	590 m	MPC · JPL
761031	2009 FH_{87}	—	March 18, 2018	Haleakala	Pan-STARRS 1	·	1.5 km	MPC · JPL
761032	2009 FB_{88}	—	September 23, 2011	Haleakala	Pan-STARRS 1	·	1.0 km	MPC · JPL
761033	2009 FD_{88}	—	May 7, 2014	Haleakala	Pan-STARRS 1	·	1.3 km	MPC · JPL
761034	2009 FF_{88}	—	March 28, 2009	Mount Lemmon	Mount Lemmon Survey	·	540 m	MPC · JPL
761035	2009 FK_{88}	—	September 23, 2014	Haleakala	Pan-STARRS 1	·	520 m	MPC · JPL
761036	2009 FT_{90}	—	March 29, 2009	Kitt Peak	Spacewatch	EUP	2.0 km	MPC · JPL
761037	2009 FW_{90}	—	March 28, 2009	Kitt Peak	Spacewatch	LIX	2.6 km	MPC · JPL
761038	2009 FK_{91}	—	March 26, 2009	Mount Lemmon	Mount Lemmon Survey	·	530 m	MPC · JPL
761039	2009 FX_{91}	—	March 31, 2009	Kitt Peak	Spacewatch	·	560 m	MPC · JPL
761040	2009 FS_{92}	—	March 26, 2009	Kitt Peak	Spacewatch	·	550 m	MPC · JPL
761041	2009 FR_{94}	—	March 19, 2009	Mount Lemmon	Mount Lemmon Survey	·	1.7 km	MPC · JPL
761042	2009 FV_{94}	—	March 31, 2009	Mount Lemmon	Mount Lemmon Survey	(2076)	490 m	MPC · JPL
761043	2009 FF_{96}	—	March 24, 2009	Mount Lemmon	Mount Lemmon Survey	·	1.4 km	MPC · JPL
761044	2009 GZ_{1}	—	March 7, 2009	Mount Lemmon	Mount Lemmon Survey	THB	2.3 km	MPC · JPL
761045	2009 GD_{4}	—	April 2, 2009	Mount Lemmon	Mount Lemmon Survey	·	2.1 km	MPC · JPL
761046	2009 GF_{7}	—	October 30, 2014	Mount Lemmon	Mount Lemmon Survey	·	550 m	MPC · JPL
761047	2009 GG_{7}	—	March 1, 2009	Kitt Peak	Spacewatch	·	890 m	MPC · JPL
761048	2009 GY_{7}	—	April 2, 2009	Mount Lemmon	Mount Lemmon Survey	H	390 m	MPC · JPL
761049	2009 GN_{8}	—	April 2, 2009	Kitt Peak	Spacewatch	·	1.1 km	MPC · JPL
761050	2009 GU_{8}	—	April 5, 2009	Calar Alto	F. Hormuth	·	1.3 km	MPC · JPL
761051	2009 GD_{9}	—	April 2, 2009	Mount Lemmon	Mount Lemmon Survey	·	2.3 km	MPC · JPL
761052	2009 GO_{9}	—	April 2, 2009	Kitt Peak	Spacewatch	·	2.0 km	MPC · JPL
761053	2009 GY_{9}	—	April 2, 2009	Kitt Peak	Spacewatch	·	2.4 km	MPC · JPL
761054	2009 GJ_{10}	—	April 2, 2009	Mount Lemmon	Mount Lemmon Survey	EOS	1.3 km	MPC · JPL
761055	2009 HJ_{1}	—	April 17, 2009	Kitt Peak	Spacewatch	·	1.3 km	MPC · JPL
761056	2009 HN_{10}	—	April 18, 2009	Kitt Peak	Spacewatch	ARM	2.7 km	MPC · JPL
761057	2009 HR_{14}	—	April 2, 2009	Mount Lemmon	Mount Lemmon Survey	·	2.1 km	MPC · JPL
761058	2009 HG_{16}	—	April 18, 2009	Kitt Peak	Spacewatch	·	2.4 km	MPC · JPL
761059	2009 HU_{24}	—	April 7, 2003	Kitt Peak	Spacewatch	·	2.6 km	MPC · JPL
761060	2009 HN_{27}	—	March 31, 2009	Kitt Peak	Spacewatch	·	490 m	MPC · JPL
761061	2009 HB_{37}	—	March 1, 2009	Kitt Peak	Spacewatch	·	2.6 km	MPC · JPL
761062	2009 HE_{43}	—	April 20, 2009	Kitt Peak	Spacewatch	·	1.0 km	MPC · JPL
761063	2009 HL_{45}	—	April 21, 2009	La Sagra	OAM	·	1.4 km	MPC · JPL
761064	2009 HG_{47}	—	April 18, 2009	Kitt Peak	Spacewatch	·	2.2 km	MPC · JPL
761065	2009 HU_{47}	—	April 19, 2009	Kitt Peak	Spacewatch	WIT	840 m	MPC · JPL
761066	2009 HP_{50}	—	April 21, 2009	Mount Lemmon	Mount Lemmon Survey	·	2.5 km	MPC · JPL
761067	2009 HD_{53}	—	October 22, 2006	Kitt Peak	Spacewatch	·	1.7 km	MPC · JPL
761068	2009 HF_{56}	—	April 21, 2009	Mount Lemmon	Mount Lemmon Survey	·	1.0 km	MPC · JPL
761069	2009 HO_{56}	—	April 21, 2009	Mount Lemmon	Mount Lemmon Survey	·	2.3 km	MPC · JPL
761070	2009 HC_{60}	—	April 24, 2009	Kitt Peak	Spacewatch	·	1.3 km	MPC · JPL
761071	2009 HZ_{66}	—	March 31, 2009	Kitt Peak	Spacewatch	URS	2.5 km	MPC · JPL
761072	2009 HU_{68}	—	March 18, 2018	Haleakala	Pan-STARRS 1	·	1.3 km	MPC · JPL
761073	2009 HM_{72}	—	March 22, 2009	Mount Lemmon	Mount Lemmon Survey	·	1.9 km	MPC · JPL
761074	2009 HA_{86}	—	March 18, 2009	Kitt Peak	Spacewatch	·	1.1 km	MPC · JPL
761075	2009 HQ_{100}	—	April 30, 2009	Kitt Peak	Spacewatch	TIR	2.2 km	MPC · JPL
761076	2009 HR_{112}	—	April 20, 2009	Mount Lemmon	Mount Lemmon Survey	·	660 m	MPC · JPL
761077	2009 HV_{112}	—	September 29, 2011	Mount Lemmon	Mount Lemmon Survey	VER	2.1 km	MPC · JPL
761078	2009 HB_{113}	—	April 1, 2009	Kitt Peak	Spacewatch	PHO	650 m	MPC · JPL
761079	2009 HF_{113}	—	April 18, 2009	Mount Lemmon	Mount Lemmon Survey	·	1.5 km	MPC · JPL
761080	2009 HE_{114}	—	April 18, 2009	Kitt Peak	Spacewatch	·	2.7 km	MPC · JPL
761081 Sandraeglīte	2009 HD_{115}	Sandraeglīte	April 26, 2009	Baldone	K. Černis, I. Eglītis	·	690 m	MPC · JPL
761082	2009 HL_{116}	—	January 18, 2015	Mount Lemmon	Mount Lemmon Survey	·	550 m	MPC · JPL
761083 Micloș	2009 HS_{116}	Micloș	August 23, 2015	La Palma	EURONEAR	·	1.2 km	MPC · JPL
761084	2009 HJ_{117}	—	March 5, 2013	Haleakala	Pan-STARRS 1	NEM	1.9 km	MPC · JPL
761085	2009 HK_{117}	—	April 20, 2009	Kitt Peak	Spacewatch	·	540 m	MPC · JPL
761086	2009 HO_{117}	—	June 13, 2018	Haleakala	Pan-STARRS 2	EUN	700 m	MPC · JPL
761087	2009 HS_{117}	—	August 15, 2013	Haleakala	Pan-STARRS 1	·	520 m	MPC · JPL
761088	2009 HT_{117}	—	April 29, 2009	Kitt Peak	Spacewatch	·	610 m	MPC · JPL
761089	2009 HV_{117}	—	April 22, 2009	Mount Lemmon	Mount Lemmon Survey	·	1.4 km	MPC · JPL
761090	2009 HA_{118}	—	June 24, 2014	Haleakala	Pan-STARRS 1	·	1.1 km	MPC · JPL
761091	2009 HB_{118}	—	October 11, 2012	Haleakala	Pan-STARRS 1	·	2.1 km	MPC · JPL
761092	2009 HT_{118}	—	September 16, 2012	Mount Lemmon	Mount Lemmon Survey	EUP	2.5 km	MPC · JPL
761093	2009 HD_{119}	—	September 12, 2015	Haleakala	Pan-STARRS 1	·	1.2 km	MPC · JPL
761094	2009 HF_{119}	—	February 14, 2013	Haleakala	Pan-STARRS 1	·	1.4 km	MPC · JPL
761095	2009 HG_{119}	—	November 17, 2014	Haleakala	Pan-STARRS 1	V	380 m	MPC · JPL
761096	2009 HP_{119}	—	November 24, 2012	Kitt Peak	Spacewatch	·	2.5 km	MPC · JPL
761097	2009 HQ_{119}	—	April 15, 2015	Kitt Peak	Spacewatch	THM	1.9 km	MPC · JPL
761098	2009 HX_{119}	—	December 23, 2016	Haleakala	Pan-STARRS 1	·	1.6 km	MPC · JPL
761099	2009 HB_{120}	—	April 21, 2009	Kitt Peak	Spacewatch	·	540 m	MPC · JPL
761100	2009 HC_{120}	—	April 22, 2009	Mount Lemmon	Mount Lemmon Survey	·	2.1 km	MPC · JPL

== 761101–761200 ==
back to top

Designation			Discovery			Properties		Ref
Permanent	Provisional	Named after	Date	Site	Discoverer(s)	Category	Diam.	Ref
761101	2009 HE_{120}	—	October 14, 2015	Kitt Peak	Spacewatch	·	880 m	MPC · JPL
761102	2009 HS_{120}	—	April 29, 2016	Mount Lemmon	Mount Lemmon Survey	·	610 m	MPC · JPL
761103	2009 HY_{120}	—	April 16, 2018	Mount Lemmon	Mount Lemmon Survey	·	1.4 km	MPC · JPL
761104	2009 HU_{121}	—	April 20, 2009	Kitt Peak	Spacewatch	·	2.7 km	MPC · JPL
761105	2009 HF_{122}	—	April 20, 2009	Mount Lemmon	Mount Lemmon Survey	THM	1.8 km	MPC · JPL
761106	2009 HT_{122}	—	April 19, 2009	Mount Lemmon	Mount Lemmon Survey	·	1.9 km	MPC · JPL
761107	2009 HU_{123}	—	April 28, 2009	Mount Lemmon	Mount Lemmon Survey	THM	1.9 km	MPC · JPL
761108	2009 HX_{123}	—	April 18, 2009	Mount Lemmon	Mount Lemmon Survey	·	530 m	MPC · JPL
761109	2009 HC_{124}	—	April 20, 2009	Kitt Peak	Spacewatch	·	630 m	MPC · JPL
761110	2009 HB_{125}	—	April 21, 2009	Mount Lemmon	Mount Lemmon Survey	·	1.4 km	MPC · JPL
761111	2009 HH_{125}	—	April 21, 2009	Kitt Peak	Spacewatch	L5	7.8 km	MPC · JPL
761112	2009 HB_{126}	—	April 29, 2009	Kitt Peak	Spacewatch	·	1.2 km	MPC · JPL
761113	2009 JG_{5}	—	March 19, 2009	Kitt Peak	Spacewatch	·	570 m	MPC · JPL
761114	2009 JS_{5}	—	May 3, 2009	Mount Lemmon	Mount Lemmon Survey	·	1.7 km	MPC · JPL
761115	2009 JA_{7}	—	April 18, 2009	Kitt Peak	Spacewatch	·	600 m	MPC · JPL
761116	2009 JN_{10}	—	March 19, 2009	Catalina	CSS	H	490 m	MPC · JPL
761117	2009 JZ_{19}	—	May 1, 2009	Mount Lemmon	Mount Lemmon Survey	EUN	720 m	MPC · JPL
761118	2009 JN_{20}	—	July 12, 2015	Haleakala	Pan-STARRS 1	·	1.9 km	MPC · JPL
761119	2009 JO_{21}	—	January 4, 2017	Haleakala	Pan-STARRS 1	·	1.3 km	MPC · JPL
761120	2009 KR	—	May 16, 2009	Kitt Peak	Spacewatch	·	1.2 km	MPC · JPL
761121	2009 KK_{8}	—	May 28, 2009	Catalina	CSS	APO · PHA	620 m	MPC · JPL
761122	2009 KJ_{10}	—	May 25, 2009	Kitt Peak	Spacewatch	·	1.2 km	MPC · JPL
761123	2009 KY_{12}	—	May 13, 2009	Kitt Peak	Spacewatch	·	2.8 km	MPC · JPL
761124	2009 KW_{23}	—	March 26, 2009	Mount Lemmon	Mount Lemmon Survey	·	1.5 km	MPC · JPL
761125	2009 KQ_{39}	—	May 30, 2009	Mount Lemmon	Mount Lemmon Survey	·	1.4 km	MPC · JPL
761126	2009 KA_{40}	—	November 10, 2010	Mount Lemmon	Mount Lemmon Survey	·	1.1 km	MPC · JPL
761127	2009 KL_{40}	—	September 2, 2014	Haleakala	Pan-STARRS 1	·	1.5 km	MPC · JPL
761128	2009 KM_{40}	—	May 27, 2009	Mount Lemmon	Mount Lemmon Survey	·	560 m	MPC · JPL
761129	2009 KU_{41}	—	May 28, 2009	Mount Lemmon	Mount Lemmon Survey	EUN	950 m	MPC · JPL
761130	2009 KK_{42}	—	March 19, 2013	Haleakala	Pan-STARRS 1	·	1.3 km	MPC · JPL
761131	2009 KM_{43}	—	May 16, 2009	Mount Lemmon	Mount Lemmon Survey	·	580 m	MPC · JPL
761132	2009 KP_{44}	—	October 2, 2011	Mayhill-ISON	L. Elenin	·	1.7 km	MPC · JPL
761133	2009 LL_{4}	—	January 1, 2008	Kitt Peak	Spacewatch	·	2.8 km	MPC · JPL
761134	2009 MW_{10}	—	June 16, 2009	Mount Lemmon	Mount Lemmon Survey	(194)	1.4 km	MPC · JPL
761135	2009 MD_{12}	—	January 10, 2016	Haleakala	Pan-STARRS 1	(194)	1.5 km	MPC · JPL
761136	2009 NK_{1}	—	June 19, 2009	Kitt Peak	Spacewatch	·	2.0 km	MPC · JPL
761137	2009 OM_{18}	—	June 24, 2009	Mount Lemmon	Mount Lemmon Survey	·	750 m	MPC · JPL
761138	2009 OA_{26}	—	July 28, 2009	Kitt Peak	Spacewatch	·	1.6 km	MPC · JPL
761139	2009 OR_{28}	—	July 28, 2009	Kitt Peak	Spacewatch	·	910 m	MPC · JPL
761140	2009 PV_{2}	—	July 29, 2009	Kitt Peak	Spacewatch	JUN	1.0 km	MPC · JPL
761141	2009 PC_{5}	—	August 15, 2009	La Sagra	OAM	·	2.7 km	MPC · JPL
761142	2009 PT_{6}	—	August 15, 2009	Kitt Peak	Spacewatch	(194)	1.5 km	MPC · JPL
761143	2009 PW_{12}	—	August 15, 2009	Kitt Peak	Spacewatch	·	2.5 km	MPC · JPL
761144	2009 PT_{23}	—	August 1, 2009	Kitt Peak	Spacewatch	·	760 m	MPC · JPL
761145	2009 QZ_{11}	—	July 29, 2009	Kitt Peak	Spacewatch	·	870 m	MPC · JPL
761146	2009 QA_{15}	—	August 16, 2009	Kitt Peak	Spacewatch	TIN	780 m	MPC · JPL
761147	2009 QH_{24}	—	August 16, 2009	Kitt Peak	Spacewatch	·	810 m	MPC · JPL
761148	2009 QM_{24}	—	August 16, 2009	Catalina	CSS	T_{j} (2.87)	2.8 km	MPC · JPL
761149	2009 QP_{45}	—	August 20, 2009	Kitt Peak	Spacewatch	·	820 m	MPC · JPL
761150	2009 QJ_{56}	—	August 28, 2009	Kitt Peak	Spacewatch	·	1.4 km	MPC · JPL
761151	2009 QF_{66}	—	August 20, 2009	Kitt Peak	Spacewatch	·	1.2 km	MPC · JPL
761152	2009 QT_{69}	—	January 4, 2016	Haleakala	Pan-STARRS 1	·	1.9 km	MPC · JPL
761153	2009 QZ_{70}	—	August 29, 2009	Kitt Peak	Spacewatch	MAS	560 m	MPC · JPL
761154	2009 QE_{71}	—	August 18, 2009	Kitt Peak	Spacewatch	·	560 m	MPC · JPL
761155	2009 QK_{71}	—	August 16, 2009	Kitt Peak	Spacewatch	·	1.4 km	MPC · JPL
761156	2009 QT_{71}	—	August 28, 2009	Kitt Peak	Spacewatch	·	1.3 km	MPC · JPL
761157	2009 QT_{72}	—	August 18, 2009	Kitt Peak	Spacewatch	·	720 m	MPC · JPL
761158	2009 QC_{73}	—	August 18, 2009	Kitt Peak	Spacewatch	·	870 m	MPC · JPL
761159	2009 QU_{73}	—	August 27, 2009	Kitt Peak	Spacewatch	MAS	420 m	MPC · JPL
761160	2009 QW_{74}	—	August 27, 2009	Kitt Peak	Spacewatch	·	750 m	MPC · JPL
761161	2009 QO_{76}	—	August 29, 2009	Kitt Peak	Spacewatch	·	770 m	MPC · JPL
761162	2009 QM_{77}	—	August 17, 2009	Kitt Peak	Spacewatch	·	2.1 km	MPC · JPL
761163	2009 QO_{77}	—	August 27, 2009	Kitt Peak	Spacewatch	V	480 m	MPC · JPL
761164	2009 QQ_{79}	—	August 17, 2009	Kitt Peak	Spacewatch	L4	6.0 km	MPC · JPL
761165	2009 RY_{4}	—	August 28, 2009	Kitt Peak	Spacewatch	NYS	890 m	MPC · JPL
761166	2009 RQ_{23}	—	September 15, 2009	Mount Lemmon	Mount Lemmon Survey	·	840 m	MPC · JPL
761167	2009 RX_{23}	—	September 15, 2009	Kitt Peak	Spacewatch	·	870 m	MPC · JPL
761168	2009 RG_{29}	—	September 14, 2009	Kitt Peak	Spacewatch	·	1.6 km	MPC · JPL
761169	2009 RY_{30}	—	September 14, 2009	Kitt Peak	Spacewatch	·	2.3 km	MPC · JPL
761170	2009 RR_{31}	—	September 14, 2009	Kitt Peak	Spacewatch	·	950 m	MPC · JPL
761171	2009 RG_{36}	—	September 15, 2009	Kitt Peak	Spacewatch	·	1.5 km	MPC · JPL
761172	2009 RC_{41}	—	September 15, 2009	Kitt Peak	Spacewatch	·	1.7 km	MPC · JPL
761173	2009 RB_{47}	—	September 15, 2009	Kitt Peak	Spacewatch	HOF	2.1 km	MPC · JPL
761174	2009 RD_{49}	—	September 15, 2009	Kitt Peak	Spacewatch	NYS	880 m	MPC · JPL
761175	2009 RB_{68}	—	September 15, 2009	Kitt Peak	Spacewatch	·	2.0 km	MPC · JPL
761176	2009 RM_{71}	—	September 15, 2009	Kitt Peak	Spacewatch	·	1.5 km	MPC · JPL
761177	2009 RM_{77}	—	September 12, 2009	Kitt Peak	Spacewatch	PHO	550 m	MPC · JPL
761178	2009 RT_{78}	—	September 18, 2014	Haleakala	Pan-STARRS 1	GEF	960 m	MPC · JPL
761179	2009 RT_{80}	—	September 15, 2009	Kitt Peak	Spacewatch	MAS	470 m	MPC · JPL
761180	2009 RN_{82}	—	September 15, 2009	Kitt Peak	Spacewatch	L4	7.0 km	MPC · JPL
761181	2009 RY_{82}	—	September 15, 2009	Mount Lemmon	Mount Lemmon Survey	·	1.4 km	MPC · JPL
761182	2009 RA_{83}	—	September 15, 2009	Kitt Peak	Spacewatch	·	1.3 km	MPC · JPL
761183	2009 SD_{4}	—	September 16, 2009	Mount Lemmon	Mount Lemmon Survey	·	570 m	MPC · JPL
761184	2009 SL_{7}	—	September 16, 2009	Mount Lemmon	Mount Lemmon Survey	·	690 m	MPC · JPL
761185	2009 SR_{7}	—	September 16, 2009	Mount Lemmon	Mount Lemmon Survey	V	450 m	MPC · JPL
761186	2009 SV_{11}	—	August 28, 2009	Kitt Peak	Spacewatch	·	660 m	MPC · JPL
761187	2009 SC_{30}	—	October 9, 2004	Kitt Peak	Spacewatch	·	1.3 km	MPC · JPL
761188	2009 SQ_{32}	—	February 28, 2008	Kitt Peak	Spacewatch	·	680 m	MPC · JPL
761189	2009 SB_{34}	—	September 16, 2009	Kitt Peak	Spacewatch	·	1.4 km	MPC · JPL
761190	2009 SY_{37}	—	September 16, 2009	Kitt Peak	Spacewatch	·	2.2 km	MPC · JPL
761191	2009 SZ_{39}	—	September 18, 2003	Kitt Peak	Spacewatch	·	2.0 km	MPC · JPL
761192	2009 SP_{41}	—	August 28, 2009	Kitt Peak	Spacewatch	·	1.3 km	MPC · JPL
761193	2009 SB_{43}	—	September 16, 2009	Kitt Peak	Spacewatch	·	850 m	MPC · JPL
761194	2009 SC_{43}	—	September 16, 2009	Mount Lemmon	Mount Lemmon Survey	·	1.8 km	MPC · JPL
761195	2009 ST_{44}	—	September 16, 2009	Kitt Peak	Spacewatch	·	870 m	MPC · JPL
761196	2009 SG_{45}	—	September 16, 2009	Kitt Peak	Spacewatch	BRA	1.1 km	MPC · JPL
761197	2009 SF_{48}	—	September 16, 2009	Kitt Peak	Spacewatch	·	1.1 km	MPC · JPL
761198	2009 SD_{55}	—	February 10, 2008	Kitt Peak	Spacewatch	·	590 m	MPC · JPL
761199	2009 SG_{57}	—	September 17, 2009	Kitt Peak	Spacewatch	GEF	930 m	MPC · JPL
761200	2009 SD_{65}	—	September 17, 2009	Mount Lemmon	Mount Lemmon Survey	MAS	510 m	MPC · JPL

== 761201–761300 ==
back to top

Designation			Discovery			Properties		Ref
Permanent	Provisional	Named after	Date	Site	Discoverer(s)	Category	Diam.	Ref
761201	2009 SC_{71}	—	August 27, 2009	Kitt Peak	Spacewatch	·	980 m	MPC · JPL
761202	2009 SF_{71}	—	August 29, 2009	Kitt Peak	Spacewatch	·	1.6 km	MPC · JPL
761203	2009 ST_{73}	—	September 17, 2009	Mount Lemmon	Mount Lemmon Survey	·	1.7 km	MPC · JPL
761204	2009 SH_{78}	—	September 18, 2009	Kitt Peak	Spacewatch	·	1.3 km	MPC · JPL
761205	2009 SR_{78}	—	September 18, 2009	Kitt Peak	Spacewatch	·	1.5 km	MPC · JPL
761206	2009 SP_{79}	—	August 27, 2009	Kitt Peak	Spacewatch	·	450 m	MPC · JPL
761207	2009 SX_{80}	—	September 18, 2009	Mount Lemmon	Mount Lemmon Survey	AGN	820 m	MPC · JPL
761208	2009 ST_{88}	—	September 18, 2009	Mount Lemmon	Mount Lemmon Survey	·	440 m	MPC · JPL
761209	2009 SH_{94}	—	September 19, 2009	Mount Lemmon	Mount Lemmon Survey	·	730 m	MPC · JPL
761210	2009 SQ_{97}	—	September 20, 2009	Mount Lemmon	Mount Lemmon Survey	·	1.6 km	MPC · JPL
761211	2009 SW_{105}	—	September 16, 2009	Mount Lemmon	Mount Lemmon Survey	·	830 m	MPC · JPL
761212	2009 SC_{113}	—	September 18, 2009	Kitt Peak	Spacewatch	·	1.4 km	MPC · JPL
761213	2009 SL_{113}	—	September 18, 2009	Kitt Peak	Spacewatch	V	540 m	MPC · JPL
761214	2009 SD_{116}	—	August 28, 2009	Kitt Peak	Spacewatch	·	550 m	MPC · JPL
761215	2009 SK_{119}	—	September 18, 2009	Kitt Peak	Spacewatch	·	2.3 km	MPC · JPL
761216	2009 SM_{122}	—	September 18, 2009	Kitt Peak	Spacewatch	NYS	780 m	MPC · JPL
761217	2009 SU_{122}	—	September 19, 1998	Apache Point	SDSS	NYS	820 m	MPC · JPL
761218	2009 SE_{127}	—	September 18, 2009	Kitt Peak	Spacewatch	PAD	1.2 km	MPC · JPL
761219	2009 SW_{131}	—	September 18, 2009	Kitt Peak	Spacewatch	MAS	520 m	MPC · JPL
761220	2009 SK_{133}	—	September 18, 2009	Kitt Peak	Spacewatch	·	780 m	MPC · JPL
761221	2009 SU_{138}	—	September 18, 2009	Mount Lemmon	Mount Lemmon Survey	·	850 m	MPC · JPL
761222	2009 SH_{142}	—	November 19, 2006	Kitt Peak	Spacewatch	·	430 m	MPC · JPL
761223	2009 SD_{143}	—	September 19, 2009	Kitt Peak	Spacewatch	·	720 m	MPC · JPL
761224	2009 SD_{149}	—	February 9, 2008	Kitt Peak	Spacewatch	V	580 m	MPC · JPL
761225	2009 SS_{149}	—	September 20, 2009	Kitt Peak	Spacewatch	·	1.2 km	MPC · JPL
761226	2009 SM_{150}	—	September 20, 2009	Kitt Peak	Spacewatch	·	490 m	MPC · JPL
761227	2009 SR_{159}	—	September 20, 2009	Kitt Peak	Spacewatch	·	1.5 km	MPC · JPL
761228	2009 SB_{174}	—	September 18, 2009	Mount Lemmon	Mount Lemmon Survey	·	1.5 km	MPC · JPL
761229	2009 SO_{176}	—	January 27, 2007	Kitt Peak	Spacewatch	·	830 m	MPC · JPL
761230	2009 SW_{178}	—	September 20, 2009	Mount Lemmon	Mount Lemmon Survey	·	750 m	MPC · JPL
761231	2009 SK_{181}	—	August 28, 2009	Kitt Peak	Spacewatch	·	1.1 km	MPC · JPL
761232	2009 SR_{184}	—	September 21, 2009	Kitt Peak	Spacewatch	·	1.4 km	MPC · JPL
761233	2009 SE_{186}	—	September 21, 2009	Kitt Peak	Spacewatch	·	940 m	MPC · JPL
761234	2009 SQ_{189}	—	September 22, 2009	Kitt Peak	Spacewatch	·	780 m	MPC · JPL
761235	2009 SM_{190}	—	September 22, 2009	Kitt Peak	Spacewatch	L4	6.5 km	MPC · JPL
761236	2009 SL_{192}	—	September 22, 2009	Kitt Peak	Spacewatch	AGN	930 m	MPC · JPL
761237	2009 SO_{195}	—	September 22, 2009	Kitt Peak	Spacewatch	·	790 m	MPC · JPL
761238	2009 SR_{196}	—	August 20, 2009	Kitt Peak	Spacewatch	·	1.4 km	MPC · JPL
761239	2009 SS_{196}	—	September 22, 2009	Kitt Peak	Spacewatch	L4	6.7 km	MPC · JPL
761240	2009 SR_{199}	—	September 18, 2009	Kitt Peak	Spacewatch	·	1.4 km	MPC · JPL
761241	2009 SX_{199}	—	September 22, 2009	Kitt Peak	Spacewatch	AGN	790 m	MPC · JPL
761242	2009 SY_{201}	—	September 22, 2009	Kitt Peak	Spacewatch	·	1.0 km	MPC · JPL
761243	2009 SQ_{202}	—	September 22, 2009	Kitt Peak	Spacewatch	MAS	470 m	MPC · JPL
761244	2009 SA_{207}	—	September 23, 2009	Kitt Peak	Spacewatch	V	460 m	MPC · JPL
761245	2009 SQ_{215}	—	September 15, 2009	Kitt Peak	Spacewatch	·	770 m	MPC · JPL
761246	2009 SQ_{219}	—	September 24, 2009	Mount Lemmon	Mount Lemmon Survey	·	1.1 km	MPC · JPL
761247	2009 SD_{220}	—	September 24, 2009	Mount Lemmon	Mount Lemmon Survey	L4	6.6 km	MPC · JPL
761248	2009 SD_{223}	—	September 16, 2009	Kitt Peak	Spacewatch	·	730 m	MPC · JPL
761249	2009 SE_{223}	—	September 25, 2009	Mount Lemmon	Mount Lemmon Survey	·	1.6 km	MPC · JPL
761250	2009 SE_{226}	—	September 15, 2009	Mount Lemmon	Mount Lemmon Survey	NYS	950 m	MPC · JPL
761251	2009 SD_{228}	—	September 26, 2009	Mount Lemmon	Mount Lemmon Survey	PHO	630 m	MPC · JPL
761252	2009 SM_{229}	—	September 26, 2009	Mount Lemmon	Mount Lemmon Survey	·	1.4 km	MPC · JPL
761253	2009 SK_{244}	—	September 17, 2009	Kitt Peak	Spacewatch	AGN	790 m	MPC · JPL
761254	2009 SZ_{246}	—	September 18, 2009	Kitt Peak	Spacewatch	L4	5.4 km	MPC · JPL
761255	2009 SL_{249}	—	September 18, 2009	Kitt Peak	Spacewatch	KOR	970 m	MPC · JPL
761256	2009 SM_{251}	—	September 20, 2009	Kitt Peak	Spacewatch	V	500 m	MPC · JPL
761257	2009 SU_{251}	—	September 20, 2009	Kitt Peak	Spacewatch	·	920 m	MPC · JPL
761258	2009 SW_{256}	—	September 21, 2009	Mount Lemmon	Mount Lemmon Survey	L4	6.7 km	MPC · JPL
761259	2009 SJ_{259}	—	September 22, 2009	Mount Lemmon	Mount Lemmon Survey	KOR	1.0 km	MPC · JPL
761260	2009 SF_{262}	—	September 23, 2009	Kitt Peak	Spacewatch	·	1.1 km	MPC · JPL
761261	2009 SN_{268}	—	September 24, 2009	Kitt Peak	Spacewatch	·	780 m	MPC · JPL
761262	2009 SR_{270}	—	January 2, 2011	Mount Lemmon	Mount Lemmon Survey	KOR	1.0 km	MPC · JPL
761263	2009 SU_{273}	—	September 12, 2009	Kitt Peak	Spacewatch	·	1.5 km	MPC · JPL
761264	2009 SU_{277}	—	October 17, 1998	Kitt Peak	Spacewatch	·	690 m	MPC · JPL
761265	2009 ST_{280}	—	September 25, 2009	Kitt Peak	Spacewatch	·	800 m	MPC · JPL
761266	2009 SA_{282}	—	September 25, 2009	Kitt Peak	Spacewatch	AGN	910 m	MPC · JPL
761267	2009 SZ_{285}	—	September 25, 2009	Mount Lemmon	Mount Lemmon Survey	·	780 m	MPC · JPL
761268	2009 SN_{289}	—	September 18, 2009	Kitt Peak	Spacewatch	·	1.0 km	MPC · JPL
761269	2009 SF_{291}	—	September 25, 2009	Kitt Peak	Spacewatch	VER	2.0 km	MPC · JPL
761270	2009 SW_{291}	—	September 26, 2009	Kitt Peak	Spacewatch	·	1.3 km	MPC · JPL
761271	2009 SW_{295}	—	September 27, 2009	Mount Lemmon	Mount Lemmon Survey	·	580 m	MPC · JPL
761272	2009 ST_{298}	—	September 17, 2009	Kitt Peak	Spacewatch	·	950 m	MPC · JPL
761273	2009 SN_{303}	—	August 16, 2009	Kitt Peak	Spacewatch	·	1.4 km	MPC · JPL
761274	2009 SZ_{303}	—	September 16, 2009	Kitt Peak	Spacewatch	L4 · ERY	6.2 km	MPC · JPL
761275	2009 SS_{305}	—	September 17, 2009	Mount Lemmon	Mount Lemmon Survey	EOS	1.3 km	MPC · JPL
761276	2009 SB_{306}	—	September 17, 2009	Mount Lemmon	Mount Lemmon Survey	·	1.1 km	MPC · JPL
761277	2009 SK_{308}	—	September 17, 2009	Mount Lemmon	Mount Lemmon Survey	·	1.3 km	MPC · JPL
761278	2009 SH_{309}	—	September 18, 2009	Mount Lemmon	Mount Lemmon Survey	·	1.9 km	MPC · JPL
761279	2009 SN_{343}	—	September 17, 2009	Kitt Peak	Spacewatch	·	830 m	MPC · JPL
761280	2009 SS_{345}	—	September 19, 2009	Kitt Peak	Spacewatch	MAS	520 m	MPC · JPL
761281	2009 SK_{346}	—	September 19, 2009	Kitt Peak	Spacewatch	·	3.2 km	MPC · JPL
761282	2009 SD_{349}	—	September 21, 2009	Mount Lemmon	Mount Lemmon Survey	·	680 m	MPC · JPL
761283	2009 SS_{356}	—	September 18, 2009	Kitt Peak	Spacewatch	·	1.7 km	MPC · JPL
761284	2009 SB_{359}	—	September 21, 2009	Catalina	CSS	·	850 m	MPC · JPL
761285	2009 SM_{362}	—	September 27, 2009	Kitt Peak	Spacewatch	V	400 m	MPC · JPL
761286	2009 SM_{369}	—	July 1, 2013	Haleakala	Pan-STARRS 1	KOR	1.1 km	MPC · JPL
761287	2009 SM_{370}	—	May 14, 2008	Mount Lemmon	Mount Lemmon Survey	·	1.6 km	MPC · JPL
761288	2009 SC_{371}	—	September 20, 2009	Mount Lemmon	Mount Lemmon Survey	GEF	960 m	MPC · JPL
761289	2009 SZ_{375}	—	April 2, 2016	Kitt Peak	Spacewatch	NYS	890 m	MPC · JPL
761290	2009 SJ_{376}	—	November 9, 2013	Mount Lemmon	Mount Lemmon Survey	·	700 m	MPC · JPL
761291	2009 SO_{376}	—	July 7, 2016	Haleakala	Pan-STARRS 1	·	780 m	MPC · JPL
761292	2009 SV_{376}	—	September 30, 2009	Mount Lemmon	Mount Lemmon Survey	·	820 m	MPC · JPL
761293	2009 SS_{377}	—	September 17, 2009	Kitt Peak	Spacewatch	·	900 m	MPC · JPL
761294	2009 SN_{379}	—	September 17, 2009	Mount Lemmon	Mount Lemmon Survey	BRA	960 m	MPC · JPL
761295	2009 SK_{380}	—	September 26, 2009	Kitt Peak	Spacewatch	MAS	540 m	MPC · JPL
761296	2009 SC_{384}	—	October 29, 2014	Haleakala	Pan-STARRS 1	·	1.7 km	MPC · JPL
761297	2009 SL_{385}	—	September 21, 2009	Mount Lemmon	Mount Lemmon Survey	KOR	1.1 km	MPC · JPL
761298	2009 SL_{386}	—	September 26, 2009	Kitt Peak	Spacewatch	·	760 m	MPC · JPL
761299	2009 SG_{388}	—	December 25, 2013	Mount Lemmon	Mount Lemmon Survey	·	800 m	MPC · JPL
761300	2009 SZ_{389}	—	September 19, 2009	Mount Lemmon	Mount Lemmon Survey	·	1.9 km	MPC · JPL

== 761301–761400 ==
back to top

Designation			Discovery			Properties		Ref
Permanent	Provisional	Named after	Date	Site	Discoverer(s)	Category	Diam.	Ref
761301	2009 ST_{392}	—	February 23, 2012	Kitt Peak	Spacewatch	·	1.7 km	MPC · JPL
761302	2009 SG_{394}	—	February 28, 2012	Haleakala	Pan-STARRS 1	AGN	810 m	MPC · JPL
761303	2009 SM_{394}	—	September 19, 2014	Haleakala	Pan-STARRS 1	KOR	1.0 km	MPC · JPL
761304	2009 SN_{394}	—	March 17, 2012	Mount Lemmon	Mount Lemmon Survey	KOR	990 m	MPC · JPL
761305	2009 SP_{394}	—	October 1, 2014	Mount Lemmon	Mount Lemmon Survey	KOR	1.0 km	MPC · JPL
761306	2009 SQ_{394}	—	September 24, 2009	Mount Lemmon	Mount Lemmon Survey	·	1.8 km	MPC · JPL
761307	2009 SF_{395}	—	September 25, 2009	Mount Lemmon	Mount Lemmon Survey	·	720 m	MPC · JPL
761308	2009 SJ_{395}	—	November 1, 2013	Kitt Peak	Spacewatch	·	730 m	MPC · JPL
761309	2009 SP_{395}	—	September 23, 2014	Mount Lemmon	Mount Lemmon Survey	·	1.4 km	MPC · JPL
761310	2009 SE_{396}	—	September 25, 2009	Mount Lemmon	Mount Lemmon Survey	·	800 m	MPC · JPL
761311	2009 SD_{397}	—	September 28, 2009	Kitt Peak	Spacewatch	·	1.5 km	MPC · JPL
761312	2009 SY_{397}	—	September 16, 2009	Mount Lemmon	Mount Lemmon Survey	MAS	570 m	MPC · JPL
761313	2009 SO_{398}	—	September 26, 2009	Kitt Peak	Spacewatch	KOR	940 m	MPC · JPL
761314	2009 SP_{398}	—	September 21, 2009	Mount Lemmon	Mount Lemmon Survey	·	1.2 km	MPC · JPL
761315	2009 SL_{399}	—	September 21, 2009	Mount Lemmon	Mount Lemmon Survey	·	1.7 km	MPC · JPL
761316	2009 ST_{399}	—	September 17, 2009	Kitt Peak	Spacewatch	MAS	490 m	MPC · JPL
761317	2009 SU_{400}	—	September 20, 2009	Mount Lemmon	Mount Lemmon Survey	·	870 m	MPC · JPL
761318	2009 SX_{400}	—	September 28, 2009	Mount Lemmon	Mount Lemmon Survey	·	1.1 km	MPC · JPL
761319	2009 SM_{401}	—	September 17, 2009	Kitt Peak	Spacewatch	·	820 m	MPC · JPL
761320	2009 SU_{401}	—	September 17, 2009	Anderson Mesa	Wasserman, L. H.	·	830 m	MPC · JPL
761321	2009 SW_{401}	—	September 20, 2009	Kitt Peak	Spacewatch	·	1.4 km	MPC · JPL
761322	2009 SC_{402}	—	September 28, 2009	Kitt Peak	Spacewatch	NYS	800 m	MPC · JPL
761323	2009 SL_{402}	—	September 29, 2009	Mount Lemmon	Mount Lemmon Survey	·	940 m	MPC · JPL
761324	2009 SH_{404}	—	September 25, 2009	Kitt Peak	Spacewatch	KOR	910 m	MPC · JPL
761325	2009 SJ_{408}	—	September 18, 2009	Kitt Peak	Spacewatch	MAS	490 m	MPC · JPL
761326	2009 SU_{408}	—	September 29, 2009	Mount Lemmon	Mount Lemmon Survey	·	2.4 km	MPC · JPL
761327	2009 SC_{410}	—	September 30, 2009	Mount Lemmon	Mount Lemmon Survey	·	1.1 km	MPC · JPL
761328	2009 SV_{410}	—	September 16, 2009	Mount Lemmon	Mount Lemmon Survey	V	480 m	MPC · JPL
761329	2009 SE_{412}	—	September 22, 2009	Mount Lemmon	Mount Lemmon Survey	·	920 m	MPC · JPL
761330	2009 SL_{413}	—	September 22, 2009	Kitt Peak	Spacewatch	·	1.5 km	MPC · JPL
761331	2009 SA_{414}	—	September 25, 2009	Kitt Peak	Spacewatch	·	1.3 km	MPC · JPL
761332	2009 SR_{414}	—	September 18, 2009	Kitt Peak	Spacewatch	L4	6.6 km	MPC · JPL
761333	2009 ST_{419}	—	September 26, 2009	Kitt Peak	Spacewatch	·	1.3 km	MPC · JPL
761334	2009 SQ_{420}	—	September 16, 2009	Kitt Peak	Spacewatch	L4	6.4 km	MPC · JPL
761335	2009 SR_{420}	—	September 18, 2009	Kitt Peak	Spacewatch	L4	6.3 km	MPC · JPL
761336	2009 SA_{428}	—	September 22, 2009	Mount Lemmon	Mount Lemmon Survey	·	1.3 km	MPC · JPL
761337	2009 SW_{431}	—	September 18, 2009	Kitt Peak	Spacewatch	·	1.3 km	MPC · JPL
761338	2009 TL_{2}	—	September 20, 2009	Kitt Peak	Spacewatch	·	1.8 km	MPC · JPL
761339	2009 TX_{9}	—	September 29, 2009	Mount Lemmon	Mount Lemmon Survey	·	2.3 km	MPC · JPL
761340	2009 TK_{23}	—	October 14, 2009	Mount Lemmon	Mount Lemmon Survey	·	1.4 km	MPC · JPL
761341	2009 TV_{23}	—	October 14, 2009	Kitt Peak	Spacewatch	·	1.2 km	MPC · JPL
761342	2009 TK_{50}	—	January 9, 2011	Mount Lemmon	Mount Lemmon Survey	·	1.6 km	MPC · JPL
761343	2009 TA_{51}	—	March 2, 2011	Kitt Peak	Spacewatch	·	720 m	MPC · JPL
761344	2009 TC_{53}	—	October 14, 2009	Kitt Peak	Spacewatch	·	2.5 km	MPC · JPL
761345	2009 TK_{54}	—	October 14, 2009	Mount Lemmon	Mount Lemmon Survey	KOR	1.0 km	MPC · JPL
761346	2009 UZ_{7}	—	September 17, 2009	Kitt Peak	Spacewatch	NYS	830 m	MPC · JPL
761347	2009 UU_{9}	—	May 8, 2005	Kitt Peak	Spacewatch	(1338) (FLO)	430 m	MPC · JPL
761348	2009 UC_{10}	—	September 22, 2009	Kitt Peak	Spacewatch	·	790 m	MPC · JPL
761349	2009 UE_{10}	—	September 29, 2009	Kitt Peak	Spacewatch	·	1.2 km	MPC · JPL
761350	2009 UH_{18}	—	October 17, 2009	Bisei	BATTeRS	·	960 m	MPC · JPL
761351	2009 UD_{28}	—	October 22, 2009	Mount Lemmon	Mount Lemmon Survey	·	920 m	MPC · JPL
761352	2009 UC_{42}	—	October 18, 2009	Mount Lemmon	Mount Lemmon Survey	·	1.4 km	MPC · JPL
761353	2009 UN_{50}	—	September 14, 2009	Kitt Peak	Spacewatch	·	900 m	MPC · JPL
761354	2009 UU_{56}	—	October 23, 2009	Mount Lemmon	Mount Lemmon Survey	·	1.4 km	MPC · JPL
761355	2009 UY_{62}	—	October 17, 2009	Mount Lemmon	Mount Lemmon Survey	HOF	2.0 km	MPC · JPL
761356	2009 UP_{67}	—	September 17, 2009	Kitt Peak	Spacewatch	AGN	930 m	MPC · JPL
761357	2009 UF_{79}	—	September 19, 2009	Mount Lemmon	Mount Lemmon Survey	·	780 m	MPC · JPL
761358	2009 UT_{82}	—	October 23, 2009	Mount Lemmon	Mount Lemmon Survey	·	940 m	MPC · JPL
761359	2009 UQ_{84}	—	October 23, 2009	Mount Lemmon	Mount Lemmon Survey	NYS	690 m	MPC · JPL
761360	2009 UW_{99}	—	October 23, 2009	Mount Lemmon	Mount Lemmon Survey	·	1.4 km	MPC · JPL
761361	2009 UO_{102}	—	October 24, 2009	Mount Lemmon	Mount Lemmon Survey	·	1.9 km	MPC · JPL
761362	2009 UW_{103}	—	September 21, 2009	Mount Lemmon	Mount Lemmon Survey	EOS	1.5 km	MPC · JPL
761363	2009 UX_{103}	—	September 29, 2009	Mount Lemmon	Mount Lemmon Survey	NYS	710 m	MPC · JPL
761364	2009 UR_{104}	—	October 25, 2009	Mount Lemmon	Mount Lemmon Survey	·	1.6 km	MPC · JPL
761365	2009 UY_{106}	—	October 22, 2009	Mount Lemmon	Mount Lemmon Survey	·	750 m	MPC · JPL
761366	2009 UN_{113}	—	October 21, 2009	Mount Lemmon	Mount Lemmon Survey	·	3.0 km	MPC · JPL
761367	2009 UX_{113}	—	September 16, 2009	Kitt Peak	Spacewatch	·	1.9 km	MPC · JPL
761368	2009 UF_{114}	—	September 28, 2009	Kitt Peak	Spacewatch	·	1.4 km	MPC · JPL
761369	2009 US_{118}	—	October 23, 2009	Mount Lemmon	Mount Lemmon Survey	L4	6.4 km	MPC · JPL
761370	2009 UF_{120}	—	September 16, 2009	Kitt Peak	Spacewatch	L4	6.8 km	MPC · JPL
761371	2009 UU_{132}	—	October 18, 2009	La Sagra	OAM	·	940 m	MPC · JPL
761372	2009 UK_{134}	—	October 23, 2009	Mount Lemmon	Mount Lemmon Survey	·	760 m	MPC · JPL
761373	2009 UF_{152}	—	October 23, 2009	Mount Lemmon	Mount Lemmon Survey	·	840 m	MPC · JPL
761374	2009 UU_{160}	—	October 18, 2009	Mount Lemmon	Mount Lemmon Survey	MAS	540 m	MPC · JPL
761375	2009 UX_{161}	—	October 23, 2009	Kitt Peak	Spacewatch	HOF	1.9 km	MPC · JPL
761376	2009 UX_{162}	—	October 22, 2009	Mount Lemmon	Mount Lemmon Survey	H	410 m	MPC · JPL
761377	2009 UU_{163}	—	August 26, 2016	Haleakala	Pan-STARRS 1	·	830 m	MPC · JPL
761378	2009 UB_{164}	—	October 18, 2009	Mount Lemmon	Mount Lemmon Survey	·	1.8 km	MPC · JPL
761379	2009 UJ_{164}	—	January 9, 2011	Mount Lemmon	Mount Lemmon Survey	·	1.6 km	MPC · JPL
761380	2009 UT_{167}	—	November 27, 2013	Haleakala	Pan-STARRS 1	PHO	690 m	MPC · JPL
761381	2009 UW_{168}	—	October 16, 2009	Mount Lemmon	Mount Lemmon Survey	·	1.1 km	MPC · JPL
761382	2009 UN_{170}	—	September 19, 2014	Haleakala	Pan-STARRS 1	·	1.3 km	MPC · JPL
761383	2009 UR_{171}	—	October 18, 2009	Mount Lemmon	Mount Lemmon Survey	EOS	1.6 km	MPC · JPL
761384	2009 UV_{171}	—	October 16, 2009	Mount Lemmon	Mount Lemmon Survey	·	740 m	MPC · JPL
761385	2009 UB_{172}	—	October 24, 2009	Mount Lemmon	Mount Lemmon Survey	L4	5.9 km	MPC · JPL
761386	2009 US_{172}	—	November 20, 2014	Haleakala	Pan-STARRS 1	·	2.0 km	MPC · JPL
761387	2009 UP_{173}	—	September 16, 2009	Mount Lemmon	Mount Lemmon Survey	·	900 m	MPC · JPL
761388	2009 UW_{173}	—	October 24, 2009	Kitt Peak	Spacewatch	·	1.6 km	MPC · JPL
761389	2009 UB_{175}	—	October 18, 2009	Mount Lemmon	Mount Lemmon Survey	·	870 m	MPC · JPL
761390	2009 UC_{175}	—	October 24, 2009	Kitt Peak	Spacewatch	·	1.4 km	MPC · JPL
761391	2009 UF_{175}	—	October 17, 2009	Mount Lemmon	Mount Lemmon Survey	AGN	930 m	MPC · JPL
761392	2009 UX_{175}	—	October 27, 2009	Kitt Peak	Spacewatch	·	700 m	MPC · JPL
761393	2009 UW_{176}	—	October 24, 2009	Kitt Peak	Spacewatch	MAS	510 m	MPC · JPL
761394	2009 UX_{176}	—	October 22, 2009	Mount Lemmon	Mount Lemmon Survey	·	1.9 km	MPC · JPL
761395	2009 UA_{177}	—	October 16, 2009	Mount Lemmon	Mount Lemmon Survey	·	960 m	MPC · JPL
761396	2009 UF_{177}	—	October 24, 2009	Kitt Peak	Spacewatch	EOS	1.4 km	MPC · JPL
761397	2009 UN_{177}	—	October 26, 2009	Kitt Peak	Spacewatch	·	630 m	MPC · JPL
761398	2009 UY_{178}	—	October 25, 2009	Kitt Peak	Spacewatch	·	1.1 km	MPC · JPL
761399	2009 UZ_{178}	—	October 16, 2009	Mount Lemmon	Mount Lemmon Survey	·	770 m	MPC · JPL
761400	2009 UD_{179}	—	October 23, 2009	Mount Lemmon	Mount Lemmon Survey	MAS	510 m	MPC · JPL

== 761401–761500 ==
back to top

Designation			Discovery			Properties		Ref
Permanent	Provisional	Named after	Date	Site	Discoverer(s)	Category	Diam.	Ref
761401	2009 UJ_{179}	—	October 27, 2009	Mount Lemmon	Mount Lemmon Survey	L4	6.0 km	MPC · JPL
761402	2009 UV_{179}	—	October 27, 2009	Kitt Peak	Spacewatch	KOR	910 m	MPC · JPL
761403	2009 US_{180}	—	October 24, 2009	Kitt Peak	Spacewatch	L4	7.5 km	MPC · JPL
761404	2009 UW_{182}	—	October 26, 2009	Mount Lemmon	Mount Lemmon Survey	·	2.0 km	MPC · JPL
761405	2009 US_{189}	—	October 22, 2009	Mount Lemmon	Mount Lemmon Survey	L4	5.6 km	MPC · JPL
761406	2009 UE_{190}	—	October 24, 2009	Kitt Peak	Spacewatch	·	1.4 km	MPC · JPL
761407	2009 UO_{194}	—	October 27, 2009	Mount Lemmon	Mount Lemmon Survey	KOR	1.1 km	MPC · JPL
761408	2009 UX_{195}	—	October 16, 2009	Mount Lemmon	Mount Lemmon Survey	·	1.2 km	MPC · JPL
761409	2009 UY_{196}	—	October 27, 2009	Kitt Peak	Spacewatch	·	1.3 km	MPC · JPL
761410	2009 VY_{8}	—	October 23, 2009	Mount Lemmon	Mount Lemmon Survey	·	1.4 km	MPC · JPL
761411	2009 VE_{12}	—	April 22, 2004	Kitt Peak	Spacewatch	·	920 m	MPC · JPL
761412	2009 VQ_{17}	—	October 23, 2009	Kitt Peak	Spacewatch	·	840 m	MPC · JPL
761413	2009 VW_{32}	—	November 9, 2009	Mount Lemmon	Mount Lemmon Survey	·	2.1 km	MPC · JPL
761414	2009 VO_{33}	—	November 10, 2009	Mount Lemmon	Mount Lemmon Survey	VER	2.0 km	MPC · JPL
761415	2009 VC_{35}	—	September 21, 2009	Mount Lemmon	Mount Lemmon Survey	NYS	790 m	MPC · JPL
761416	2009 VQ_{40}	—	October 1, 2009	Mount Lemmon	Mount Lemmon Survey	·	1.3 km	MPC · JPL
761417	2009 VC_{48}	—	November 9, 2009	Mount Lemmon	Mount Lemmon Survey	·	880 m	MPC · JPL
761418	2009 VO_{48}	—	October 21, 2009	Mount Lemmon	Mount Lemmon Survey	·	850 m	MPC · JPL
761419	2009 VQ_{52}	—	September 21, 2009	Mount Lemmon	Mount Lemmon Survey	L4	7.1 km	MPC · JPL
761420	2009 VC_{53}	—	October 24, 2009	Kitt Peak	Spacewatch	TEL	1.1 km	MPC · JPL
761421	2009 VV_{58}	—	September 16, 2009	Mount Lemmon	Mount Lemmon Survey	TIN	1.1 km	MPC · JPL
761422	2009 VY_{60}	—	September 16, 2009	Mount Lemmon	Mount Lemmon Survey	MAS	520 m	MPC · JPL
761423	2009 VT_{65}	—	November 9, 2009	Kitt Peak	Spacewatch	·	740 m	MPC · JPL
761424	2009 VZ_{74}	—	September 15, 2009	Kitt Peak	Spacewatch	·	790 m	MPC · JPL
761425	2009 VQ_{81}	—	October 24, 2009	Kitt Peak	Spacewatch	·	1.5 km	MPC · JPL
761426	2009 VV_{83}	—	November 9, 2009	Kitt Peak	Spacewatch	·	2.3 km	MPC · JPL
761427	2009 VH_{89}	—	November 11, 2009	Kitt Peak	Spacewatch	·	1.0 km	MPC · JPL
761428	2009 VC_{101}	—	November 10, 2009	Kitt Peak	Spacewatch	·	860 m	MPC · JPL
761429	2009 VK_{119}	—	November 10, 2009	Kitt Peak	Spacewatch	·	1.5 km	MPC · JPL
761430	2009 VA_{120}	—	November 10, 2009	Kitt Peak	Spacewatch	·	1.6 km	MPC · JPL
761431	2009 VD_{121}	—	February 25, 2011	Mount Lemmon	Mount Lemmon Survey	KOR	930 m	MPC · JPL
761432	2009 VC_{123}	—	November 9, 2009	Mount Lemmon	Mount Lemmon Survey	·	1.6 km	MPC · JPL
761433	2009 VU_{123}	—	November 8, 2009	Mount Lemmon	Mount Lemmon Survey	·	910 m	MPC · JPL
761434	2009 VV_{123}	—	November 9, 2009	Mount Lemmon	Mount Lemmon Survey	·	810 m	MPC · JPL
761435	2009 VY_{123}	—	September 19, 2014	Haleakala	Pan-STARRS 1	EOS	1.5 km	MPC · JPL
761436	2009 VR_{124}	—	November 11, 2009	Kitt Peak	Spacewatch	·	1.7 km	MPC · JPL
761437	2009 VF_{126}	—	November 10, 2009	Mount Lemmon	Mount Lemmon Survey	·	1.3 km	MPC · JPL
761438	2009 VN_{126}	—	November 11, 2009	Kitt Peak	Spacewatch	·	1.5 km	MPC · JPL
761439	2009 VX_{126}	—	November 11, 2009	Kitt Peak	Spacewatch	·	850 m	MPC · JPL
761440	2009 VA_{128}	—	November 11, 2009	Mount Lemmon	Mount Lemmon Survey	·	2.0 km	MPC · JPL
761441	2009 VO_{128}	—	November 9, 2009	Mount Lemmon	Mount Lemmon Survey	V	430 m	MPC · JPL
761442	2009 VX_{128}	—	November 8, 2009	Mount Lemmon	Mount Lemmon Survey	L4	6.3 km	MPC · JPL
761443	2009 VV_{129}	—	November 11, 2009	Kitt Peak	Spacewatch	·	1.3 km	MPC · JPL
761444	2009 VP_{132}	—	November 9, 2009	Kitt Peak	Spacewatch	L4	6.0 km	MPC · JPL
761445	2009 WS_{12}	—	November 16, 2009	Mount Lemmon	Mount Lemmon Survey	·	1.4 km	MPC · JPL
761446	2009 WW_{22}	—	November 11, 2009	Kitt Peak	Spacewatch	·	1.7 km	MPC · JPL
761447	2009 WL_{24}	—	November 19, 2009	Mount Lemmon	Mount Lemmon Survey	·	720 m	MPC · JPL
761448	2009 WH_{37}	—	October 16, 2009	Mount Lemmon	Mount Lemmon Survey	·	1.8 km	MPC · JPL
761449	2009 WJ_{48}	—	November 10, 2009	Mount Lemmon	Mount Lemmon Survey	·	1.6 km	MPC · JPL
761450	2009 WF_{51}	—	October 27, 2009	Mount Lemmon	Mount Lemmon Survey	·	1.5 km	MPC · JPL
761451	2009 WQ_{51}	—	November 20, 2009	Kitt Peak	Spacewatch	MAS	580 m	MPC · JPL
761452	2009 WX_{55}	—	October 23, 2009	Mount Lemmon	Mount Lemmon Survey	·	870 m	MPC · JPL
761453	2009 WP_{79}	—	October 1, 2005	Kitt Peak	Spacewatch	·	770 m	MPC · JPL
761454	2009 WV_{79}	—	September 23, 2005	Kitt Peak	Spacewatch	NYS	770 m	MPC · JPL
761455	2009 WN_{86}	—	November 19, 2009	Kitt Peak	Spacewatch	·	1.3 km	MPC · JPL
761456	2009 WU_{86}	—	October 13, 2005	Kitt Peak	Spacewatch	·	760 m	MPC · JPL
761457	2009 WZ_{86}	—	November 19, 2009	Kitt Peak	Spacewatch	PHO	510 m	MPC · JPL
761458	2009 WB_{92}	—	November 19, 2009	Mount Lemmon	Mount Lemmon Survey	·	1.4 km	MPC · JPL
761459	2009 WP_{94}	—	October 27, 2009	Mount Lemmon	Mount Lemmon Survey	NEM	1.7 km	MPC · JPL
761460	2009 WA_{103}	—	November 22, 2009	Kitt Peak	Spacewatch	V	480 m	MPC · JPL
761461	2009 WB_{116}	—	September 16, 2009	Kitt Peak	Spacewatch	·	840 m	MPC · JPL
761462	2009 WZ_{118}	—	October 23, 2009	Kitt Peak	Spacewatch	·	2.2 km	MPC · JPL
761463	2009 WY_{123}	—	November 20, 2009	Kitt Peak	Spacewatch	AGN	850 m	MPC · JPL
761464	2009 WE_{133}	—	November 8, 2009	Mount Lemmon	Mount Lemmon Survey	·	800 m	MPC · JPL
761465	2009 WR_{139}	—	September 27, 2009	Kitt Peak	Spacewatch	·	2.1 km	MPC · JPL
761466	2009 WZ_{140}	—	November 18, 2009	Mount Lemmon	Mount Lemmon Survey	·	1.2 km	MPC · JPL
761467	2009 WL_{141}	—	October 14, 2009	Mount Lemmon	Mount Lemmon Survey	·	2.3 km	MPC · JPL
761468	2009 WT_{142}	—	November 19, 2009	Mount Lemmon	Mount Lemmon Survey	NYS	820 m	MPC · JPL
761469	2009 WE_{144}	—	November 19, 2009	Mount Lemmon	Mount Lemmon Survey	NYS	800 m	MPC · JPL
761470	2009 WJ_{144}	—	October 11, 2009	Mount Lemmon	Mount Lemmon Survey	·	760 m	MPC · JPL
761471	2009 WE_{147}	—	September 28, 2009	Mount Lemmon	Mount Lemmon Survey	·	600 m	MPC · JPL
761472	2009 WA_{148}	—	November 19, 2009	Mount Lemmon	Mount Lemmon Survey	·	1.2 km	MPC · JPL
761473	2009 WY_{160}	—	October 22, 2009	Mount Lemmon	Mount Lemmon Survey	·	1.4 km	MPC · JPL
761474	2009 WQ_{162}	—	November 21, 2009	Kitt Peak	Spacewatch	·	930 m	MPC · JPL
761475	2009 WR_{162}	—	November 21, 2009	Kitt Peak	Spacewatch	·	1.7 km	MPC · JPL
761476	2009 WF_{164}	—	November 21, 2009	Kitt Peak	Spacewatch	EOS	1.3 km	MPC · JPL
761477	2009 WQ_{164}	—	October 26, 2009	Mount Lemmon	Mount Lemmon Survey	·	2.9 km	MPC · JPL
761478	2009 WL_{185}	—	April 30, 2008	Mount Lemmon	Mount Lemmon Survey	·	980 m	MPC · JPL
761479	2009 WC_{187}	—	November 16, 2009	Kitt Peak	Spacewatch	EOS	1.5 km	MPC · JPL
761480	2009 WP_{191}	—	November 24, 2009	Mount Lemmon	Mount Lemmon Survey	·	1.1 km	MPC · JPL
761481	2009 WX_{197}	—	November 22, 2009	Catalina	CSS	·	760 m	MPC · JPL
761482	2009 WF_{202}	—	November 26, 2009	Mount Lemmon	Mount Lemmon Survey	·	1.5 km	MPC · JPL
761483	2009 WA_{203}	—	May 22, 2001	Cerro Tololo	Deep Ecliptic Survey	·	2.3 km	MPC · JPL
761484	2009 WC_{205}	—	November 17, 2009	Kitt Peak	Spacewatch	·	900 m	MPC · JPL
761485	2009 WP_{206}	—	October 25, 2003	Kitt Peak	Spacewatch	·	2.3 km	MPC · JPL
761486	2009 WU_{213}	—	October 1, 2014	Haleakala	Pan-STARRS 1	·	2.1 km	MPC · JPL
761487	2009 WW_{218}	—	October 22, 2009	Mount Lemmon	Mount Lemmon Survey	·	740 m	MPC · JPL
761488	2009 WG_{219}	—	November 16, 2009	Kitt Peak	Spacewatch	·	2.1 km	MPC · JPL
761489	2009 WO_{219}	—	October 23, 2009	Mount Lemmon	Mount Lemmon Survey	CLA	1.3 km	MPC · JPL
761490	2009 WY_{221}	—	October 22, 2009	Mount Lemmon	Mount Lemmon Survey	·	1.5 km	MPC · JPL
761491	2009 WR_{222}	—	October 22, 2009	Mount Lemmon	Mount Lemmon Survey	·	780 m	MPC · JPL
761492	2009 WM_{223}	—	November 16, 2009	Kitt Peak	Spacewatch	·	740 m	MPC · JPL
761493	2009 WO_{223}	—	November 16, 2009	Mount Lemmon	Mount Lemmon Survey	NYS	760 m	MPC · JPL
761494	2009 WE_{226}	—	October 23, 2009	Mount Lemmon	Mount Lemmon Survey	MAS	500 m	MPC · JPL
761495	2009 WE_{227}	—	November 17, 2009	Mount Lemmon	Mount Lemmon Survey	KOR	1.2 km	MPC · JPL
761496	2009 WO_{235}	—	November 21, 2009	Kitt Peak	Spacewatch	·	970 m	MPC · JPL
761497	2009 WT_{242}	—	October 27, 2009	Kitt Peak	Spacewatch	·	2.0 km	MPC · JPL
761498	2009 WX_{270}	—	November 24, 2009	Kitt Peak	Spacewatch	NYS	820 m	MPC · JPL
761499	2009 WA_{274}	—	November 23, 2009	Kitt Peak	Spacewatch	·	1.1 km	MPC · JPL
761500	2009 WZ_{274}	—	December 11, 2014	Mount Lemmon	Mount Lemmon Survey	·	1.6 km	MPC · JPL

== 761501–761600 ==
back to top

Designation			Discovery			Properties		Ref
Permanent	Provisional	Named after	Date	Site	Discoverer(s)	Category	Diam.	Ref
761501	2009 WA_{276}	—	October 1, 2014	Haleakala	Pan-STARRS 1	·	1.8 km	MPC · JPL
761502	2009 WV_{276}	—	October 2, 2014	Haleakala	Pan-STARRS 1	·	1.3 km	MPC · JPL
761503	2009 WE_{279}	—	November 19, 2009	Mount Lemmon	Mount Lemmon Survey	EOS	1.3 km	MPC · JPL
761504	2009 WC_{280}	—	May 16, 2018	Mount Lemmon	Mount Lemmon Survey	·	2.2 km	MPC · JPL
761505	2009 WR_{280}	—	July 16, 2013	Haleakala	Pan-STARRS 1	·	1.5 km	MPC · JPL
761506	2009 WS_{280}	—	November 11, 2009	Kitt Peak	Spacewatch	·	1.0 km	MPC · JPL
761507	2009 WF_{281}	—	November 11, 2009	Kitt Peak	Spacewatch	·	1.5 km	MPC · JPL
761508	2009 WO_{281}	—	April 12, 2018	Haleakala	Pan-STARRS 1	·	600 m	MPC · JPL
761509	2009 WL_{282}	—	August 2, 2016	Haleakala	Pan-STARRS 1	3:2 · SHU	3.3 km	MPC · JPL
761510	2009 WJ_{283}	—	December 30, 2013	Haleakala	Pan-STARRS 1	·	860 m	MPC · JPL
761511	2009 WA_{284}	—	April 20, 2015	Haleakala	Pan-STARRS 1	·	850 m	MPC · JPL
761512	2009 WO_{284}	—	April 15, 2015	Mount Lemmon	Mount Lemmon Survey	·	870 m	MPC · JPL
761513	2009 WQ_{284}	—	March 11, 2011	Kitt Peak	Spacewatch	·	760 m	MPC · JPL
761514	2009 WJ_{285}	—	November 17, 2009	Kitt Peak	Spacewatch	L4	6.3 km	MPC · JPL
761515	2009 WX_{285}	—	February 11, 2016	Haleakala	Pan-STARRS 1	DOR	2.2 km	MPC · JPL
761516	2009 WS_{286}	—	November 16, 2014	Mount Lemmon	Mount Lemmon Survey	·	1.4 km	MPC · JPL
761517	2009 WA_{287}	—	November 22, 2014	Haleakala	Pan-STARRS 1	·	1.6 km	MPC · JPL
761518	2009 WA_{288}	—	November 25, 2009	Kitt Peak	Spacewatch	·	2.4 km	MPC · JPL
761519	2009 WM_{288}	—	November 24, 2009	Kitt Peak	Spacewatch	·	1.5 km	MPC · JPL
761520	2009 WN_{288}	—	November 18, 2009	Mount Lemmon	Mount Lemmon Survey	·	1.9 km	MPC · JPL
761521	2009 WH_{291}	—	November 27, 2009	Mount Lemmon	Mount Lemmon Survey	VER	2.1 km	MPC · JPL
761522	2009 WZ_{292}	—	November 17, 2009	Kitt Peak	Spacewatch	·	810 m	MPC · JPL
761523	2009 WP_{294}	—	November 17, 2009	Mount Lemmon	Mount Lemmon Survey	PAD	1.2 km	MPC · JPL
761524	2009 WN_{298}	—	November 17, 2009	Mount Lemmon	Mount Lemmon Survey	·	1.2 km	MPC · JPL
761525	2009 WK_{299}	—	November 25, 2009	Kitt Peak	Spacewatch	·	1.6 km	MPC · JPL
761526	2009 WR_{300}	—	November 18, 2009	Mount Lemmon	Mount Lemmon Survey	·	1.5 km	MPC · JPL
761527	2009 WQ_{301}	—	November 25, 2009	Kitt Peak	Spacewatch	·	1.5 km	MPC · JPL
761528	2009 WM_{302}	—	November 25, 2009	Kitt Peak	Spacewatch	·	790 m	MPC · JPL
761529	2009 XL_{12}	—	December 11, 2009	Mount Lemmon	Mount Lemmon Survey	·	2.7 km	MPC · JPL
761530	2009 XL_{16}	—	November 17, 2009	Mount Lemmon	Mount Lemmon Survey	·	1.8 km	MPC · JPL
761531	2009 XH_{25}	—	December 18, 2009	Mount Lemmon	Mount Lemmon Survey	PHO	720 m	MPC · JPL
761532	2009 XQ_{26}	—	May 25, 2011	Mount Lemmon	Mount Lemmon Survey	·	1.1 km	MPC · JPL
761533	2009 XQ_{27}	—	December 15, 2009	Mount Lemmon	Mount Lemmon Survey	·	1.1 km	MPC · JPL
761534	2009 XB_{29}	—	December 11, 2009	Mount Lemmon	Mount Lemmon Survey	KOR	1.2 km	MPC · JPL
761535	2009 XC_{29}	—	December 11, 2009	Mount Lemmon	Mount Lemmon Survey	·	1.4 km	MPC · JPL
761536	2009 YN_{2}	—	December 17, 2009	Mount Lemmon	Mount Lemmon Survey	·	1.6 km	MPC · JPL
761537	2009 YC_{3}	—	December 17, 2009	Mount Lemmon	Mount Lemmon Survey	ELF	2.7 km	MPC · JPL
761538	2009 YM_{15}	—	December 18, 2009	Kitt Peak	Spacewatch	·	960 m	MPC · JPL
761539	2009 YD_{17}	—	December 20, 2009	Kitt Peak	Spacewatch	NAE	1.8 km	MPC · JPL
761540	2009 YL_{17}	—	October 23, 2005	Catalina	CSS	·	890 m	MPC · JPL
761541	2009 YZ_{29}	—	September 27, 2003	Kitt Peak	Spacewatch	·	1.2 km	MPC · JPL
761542	2009 YB_{30}	—	January 22, 2015	Haleakala	Pan-STARRS 1	PAD	1.2 km	MPC · JPL
761543	2009 YJ_{30}	—	December 19, 2009	Mount Lemmon	Mount Lemmon Survey	·	1.5 km	MPC · JPL
761544	2009 YR_{30}	—	January 9, 2014	Kitt Peak	Spacewatch	·	1.0 km	MPC · JPL
761545	2009 YL_{31}	—	January 17, 2015	Mount Lemmon	Mount Lemmon Survey	·	2.4 km	MPC · JPL
761546	2009 YM_{31}	—	August 14, 2015	Haleakala	Pan-STARRS 1	3:2	4.4 km	MPC · JPL
761547	2009 YS_{32}	—	December 20, 2009	Mount Lemmon	Mount Lemmon Survey	·	1.4 km	MPC · JPL
761548	2009 YU_{32}	—	December 18, 2009	Mount Lemmon	Mount Lemmon Survey	·	1.8 km	MPC · JPL
761549	2009 YW_{32}	—	December 25, 2009	Kitt Peak	Spacewatch	NYS	810 m	MPC · JPL
761550	2009 YM_{33}	—	December 20, 2009	Mount Lemmon	Mount Lemmon Survey	·	2.1 km	MPC · JPL
761551	2009 YN_{33}	—	December 25, 2009	Kitt Peak	Spacewatch	·	1.7 km	MPC · JPL
761552	2009 YR_{34}	—	December 17, 2009	Mount Lemmon	Mount Lemmon Survey	AGN	970 m	MPC · JPL
761553	2010 AO_{9}	—	January 6, 2010	Kitt Peak	Spacewatch	·	1.2 km	MPC · JPL
761554	2010 AW_{13}	—	January 7, 2010	Kitt Peak	Spacewatch	·	1.9 km	MPC · JPL
761555	2010 AF_{14}	—	January 7, 2010	Kitt Peak	Spacewatch	EOS	1.4 km	MPC · JPL
761556	2010 AB_{19}	—	January 7, 2010	Mount Lemmon	Mount Lemmon Survey	·	1.0 km	MPC · JPL
761557	2010 AO_{34}	—	January 7, 2010	Kitt Peak	Spacewatch	EMA	2.1 km	MPC · JPL
761558	2010 AM_{35}	—	January 7, 2010	Kitt Peak	Spacewatch	·	2.0 km	MPC · JPL
761559	2010 AZ_{42}	—	January 6, 2010	Mount Lemmon	Mount Lemmon Survey	·	930 m	MPC · JPL
761560	2010 AX_{45}	—	January 7, 2010	Mount Lemmon	Mount Lemmon Survey	·	1.4 km	MPC · JPL
761561	2010 AH_{52}	—	December 27, 2009	Kitt Peak	Spacewatch	·	1.0 km	MPC · JPL
761562	2010 AQ_{72}	—	January 13, 2010	Mount Lemmon	Mount Lemmon Survey	·	1.1 km	MPC · JPL
761563	2010 AK_{147}	—	January 12, 2018	Mount Lemmon	Mount Lemmon Survey	·	930 m	MPC · JPL
761564	2010 AA_{150}	—	October 24, 2009	Kitt Peak	Spacewatch	·	2.6 km	MPC · JPL
761565	2010 AX_{155}	—	December 21, 2014	Haleakala	Pan-STARRS 1	·	1.7 km	MPC · JPL
761566	2010 AC_{159}	—	January 7, 2017	Mount Lemmon	Mount Lemmon Survey	·	600 m	MPC · JPL
761567	2010 AL_{160}	—	January 9, 2017	Mount Lemmon	Mount Lemmon Survey	·	580 m	MPC · JPL
761568	2010 AQ_{160}	—	August 30, 2016	Haleakala	Pan-STARRS 1	V	510 m	MPC · JPL
761569	2010 AN_{163}	—	January 7, 2010	Kitt Peak	Spacewatch	·	1.4 km	MPC · JPL
761570	2010 AK_{164}	—	January 12, 2010	Kitt Peak	Spacewatch	MAS	530 m	MPC · JPL
761571	2010 AR_{164}	—	January 7, 2010	Kitt Peak	Spacewatch	EOS	1.5 km	MPC · JPL
761572	2010 AX_{166}	—	April 26, 2017	Haleakala	Pan-STARRS 1	·	1.5 km	MPC · JPL
761573	2010 BU_{136}	—	April 23, 2015	Haleakala	Pan-STARRS 1	L4	7.4 km	MPC · JPL
761574	2010 BO_{148}	—	November 18, 2008	Kitt Peak	Spacewatch	PHO	780 m	MPC · JPL
761575	2010 CT_{25}	—	February 9, 2010	Mount Lemmon	Mount Lemmon Survey	·	720 m	MPC · JPL
761576	2010 CG_{26}	—	February 9, 2010	Mount Lemmon	Mount Lemmon Survey	VER	2.1 km	MPC · JPL
761577	2010 CR_{27}	—	February 9, 2010	Mount Lemmon	Mount Lemmon Survey	·	570 m	MPC · JPL
761578	2010 CW_{29}	—	February 9, 2010	Mount Lemmon	Mount Lemmon Survey	·	870 m	MPC · JPL
761579	2010 CX_{35}	—	February 10, 2010	Kitt Peak	Spacewatch	JUN	880 m	MPC · JPL
761580	2010 CU_{37}	—	January 11, 2010	Kitt Peak	Spacewatch	·	2.4 km	MPC · JPL
761581	2010 CE_{38}	—	February 13, 2010	Mount Lemmon	Mount Lemmon Survey	EOS	1.5 km	MPC · JPL
761582	2010 CD_{40}	—	February 13, 2010	Mount Lemmon	Mount Lemmon Survey	·	2.2 km	MPC · JPL
761583	2010 CT_{63}	—	February 9, 2010	Kitt Peak	Spacewatch	·	1.1 km	MPC · JPL
761584	2010 CK_{73}	—	February 13, 2010	Mount Lemmon	Mount Lemmon Survey	MAR	970 m	MPC · JPL
761585	2010 CS_{73}	—	February 13, 2010	Mount Lemmon	Mount Lemmon Survey	·	1.9 km	MPC · JPL
761586	2010 CS_{77}	—	February 13, 2010	Mount Lemmon	Mount Lemmon Survey	·	2.2 km	MPC · JPL
761587	2010 CP_{83}	—	March 2, 2006	Kitt Peak	Spacewatch	·	1.1 km	MPC · JPL
761588	2010 CC_{85}	—	February 14, 2010	Kitt Peak	Spacewatch	THM	1.8 km	MPC · JPL
761589	2010 CJ_{90}	—	February 14, 2010	Mount Lemmon	Mount Lemmon Survey	VER	1.9 km	MPC · JPL
761590	2010 CR_{93}	—	February 14, 2010	Kitt Peak	Spacewatch	·	2.4 km	MPC · JPL
761591	2010 CC_{96}	—	February 14, 2010	Mount Lemmon	Mount Lemmon Survey	·	2.0 km	MPC · JPL
761592	2010 CY_{96}	—	February 14, 2010	Mount Lemmon	Mount Lemmon Survey	·	2.1 km	MPC · JPL
761593	2010 CK_{100}	—	February 14, 2010	Mount Lemmon	Mount Lemmon Survey	·	2.4 km	MPC · JPL
761594	2010 CT_{100}	—	February 14, 2010	Mount Lemmon	Mount Lemmon Survey	·	2.2 km	MPC · JPL
761595	2010 CD_{103}	—	February 14, 2010	Mount Lemmon	Mount Lemmon Survey	·	1.3 km	MPC · JPL
761596	2010 CC_{105}	—	October 8, 2008	Kitt Peak	Spacewatch	·	1.0 km	MPC · JPL
761597	2010 CP_{105}	—	February 14, 2010	Mount Lemmon	Mount Lemmon Survey	·	1.8 km	MPC · JPL
761598	2010 CC_{106}	—	February 14, 2010	Mount Lemmon	Mount Lemmon Survey	·	1.8 km	MPC · JPL
761599	2010 CO_{106}	—	February 14, 2010	Mount Lemmon	Mount Lemmon Survey	·	990 m	MPC · JPL
761600	2010 CG_{107}	—	February 14, 2010	Mount Lemmon	Mount Lemmon Survey	·	2.6 km	MPC · JPL

== 761601–761700 ==
back to top

Designation			Discovery			Properties		Ref
Permanent	Provisional	Named after	Date	Site	Discoverer(s)	Category	Diam.	Ref
761601	2010 CW_{116}	—	February 14, 2010	Mount Lemmon	Mount Lemmon Survey	H	330 m	MPC · JPL
761602	2010 CL_{118}	—	January 6, 2006	Mount Lemmon	Mount Lemmon Survey	·	1.4 km	MPC · JPL
761603	2010 CE_{121}	—	February 15, 2010	Kitt Peak	Spacewatch	·	1.2 km	MPC · JPL
761604	2010 CY_{126}	—	February 15, 2010	Mount Lemmon	Mount Lemmon Survey	·	1.4 km	MPC · JPL
761605	2010 CZ_{167}	—	February 15, 2010	Mount Lemmon	Mount Lemmon Survey	·	1.7 km	MPC · JPL
761606	2010 CO_{173}	—	March 12, 2005	Kitt Peak	Spacewatch	·	1.6 km	MPC · JPL
761607	2010 CJ_{271}	—	March 16, 2016	Haleakala	Pan-STARRS 1	EOS	1.4 km	MPC · JPL
761608	2010 CM_{271}	—	February 14, 2010	Kitt Peak	Spacewatch	·	2.5 km	MPC · JPL
761609	2010 CN_{272}	—	April 3, 2011	Haleakala	Pan-STARRS 1	EOS	1.6 km	MPC · JPL
761610	2010 CB_{273}	—	January 13, 2015	Haleakala	Pan-STARRS 1	·	1.9 km	MPC · JPL
761611	2010 CM_{274}	—	February 15, 2010	Mount Lemmon	Mount Lemmon Survey	·	2.1 km	MPC · JPL
761612	2010 CO_{274}	—	January 18, 2015	Mount Lemmon	Mount Lemmon Survey	·	2.4 km	MPC · JPL
761613	2010 CH_{275}	—	April 27, 2017	Haleakala	Pan-STARRS 1	·	2.6 km	MPC · JPL
761614	2010 CR_{275}	—	February 14, 2010	Mount Lemmon	Mount Lemmon Survey	·	2.1 km	MPC · JPL
761615	2010 DB_{3}	—	February 16, 2010	Kitt Peak	Spacewatch	MAS	580 m	MPC · JPL
761616	2010 DU_{4}	—	February 16, 2010	Mount Lemmon	Mount Lemmon Survey	·	1.3 km	MPC · JPL
761617	2010 DO_{10}	—	February 16, 2010	Mount Lemmon	Mount Lemmon Survey	·	2.2 km	MPC · JPL
761618	2010 DR_{11}	—	February 16, 2010	Mount Lemmon	Mount Lemmon Survey	·	2.4 km	MPC · JPL
761619	2010 DJ_{39}	—	October 6, 2008	Mount Lemmon	Mount Lemmon Survey	·	1.3 km	MPC · JPL
761620	2010 DA_{48}	—	February 17, 2010	Mount Lemmon	Mount Lemmon Survey	·	1.5 km	MPC · JPL
761621	2010 DR_{96}	—	September 30, 2017	Mount Lemmon	Mount Lemmon Survey	·	2.8 km	MPC · JPL
761622	2010 DH_{107}	—	May 8, 2011	Kitt Peak	Spacewatch	·	2.6 km	MPC · JPL
761623	2010 DQ_{109}	—	August 8, 2013	Kitt Peak	Spacewatch	·	1.8 km	MPC · JPL
761624	2010 DE_{110}	—	April 4, 2014	Haleakala	Pan-STARRS 1	·	900 m	MPC · JPL
761625	2010 DA_{111}	—	March 18, 2016	Mount Lemmon	Mount Lemmon Survey	EOS	1.5 km	MPC · JPL
761626	2010 DL_{111}	—	January 20, 2015	Haleakala	Pan-STARRS 1	·	1.4 km	MPC · JPL
761627	2010 DR_{112}	—	February 17, 2010	Mount Lemmon	Mount Lemmon Survey	·	610 m	MPC · JPL
761628	2010 DK_{113}	—	February 17, 2010	Kitt Peak	Spacewatch	(5)	1.1 km	MPC · JPL
761629	2010 DS_{113}	—	February 18, 2010	Mount Lemmon	Mount Lemmon Survey	·	2.1 km	MPC · JPL
761630	2010 DY_{115}	—	February 16, 2010	Kitt Peak	Spacewatch	·	2.3 km	MPC · JPL
761631	2010 EE_{33}	—	March 4, 2010	Kitt Peak	Spacewatch	·	2.1 km	MPC · JPL
761632	2010 EO_{66}	—	October 28, 2008	Mount Lemmon	Mount Lemmon Survey	·	1.1 km	MPC · JPL
761633	2010 ET_{71}	—	September 22, 2008	Mount Lemmon	Mount Lemmon Survey	·	1.5 km	MPC · JPL
761634	2010 ED_{75}	—	February 14, 2010	Kitt Peak	Spacewatch	·	700 m	MPC · JPL
761635	2010 EM_{83}	—	March 12, 2010	Kitt Peak	Spacewatch	·	420 m	MPC · JPL
761636	2010 ES_{84}	—	March 13, 2010	Mount Lemmon	Mount Lemmon Survey	·	1.5 km	MPC · JPL
761637	2010 EJ_{90}	—	February 18, 2010	Kitt Peak	Spacewatch	·	380 m	MPC · JPL
761638	2010 EN_{93}	—	February 14, 2010	Kitt Peak	Spacewatch	·	2.3 km	MPC · JPL
761639	2010 EA_{94}	—	February 14, 2010	Kitt Peak	Spacewatch	·	2.0 km	MPC · JPL
761640	2010 EM_{102}	—	March 15, 2010	Kitt Peak	Spacewatch	NYS	860 m	MPC · JPL
761641	2010 EY_{123}	—	February 18, 2010	Kitt Peak	Spacewatch	·	2.2 km	MPC · JPL
761642	2010 EQ_{142}	—	March 12, 2010	Kitt Peak	Spacewatch	·	940 m	MPC · JPL
761643	2010 EG_{185}	—	February 5, 2016	Haleakala	Pan-STARRS 1	·	1.8 km	MPC · JPL
761644	2010 EV_{189}	—	August 14, 2013	Haleakala	Pan-STARRS 1	·	1.8 km	MPC · JPL
761645	2010 ES_{190}	—	November 14, 2018	Haleakala	Pan-STARRS 2	·	1.3 km	MPC · JPL
761646	2010 EU_{190}	—	March 13, 2010	Kitt Peak	Spacewatch	·	1.5 km	MPC · JPL
761647	2010 EQ_{191}	—	March 13, 2010	Mount Lemmon	Mount Lemmon Survey	·	2.4 km	MPC · JPL
761648	2010 ES_{191}	—	March 4, 2010	Kitt Peak	Spacewatch	ADE	1.4 km	MPC · JPL
761649	2010 EM_{192}	—	September 13, 2018	Mount Lemmon	Mount Lemmon Survey	·	2.6 km	MPC · JPL
761650	2010 FZ	—	March 4, 2010	Kitt Peak	Spacewatch	·	1.0 km	MPC · JPL
761651	2010 FU_{15}	—	March 12, 2010	Kitt Peak	Spacewatch	·	1.7 km	MPC · JPL
761652	2010 FH_{19}	—	March 18, 2010	Kitt Peak	Spacewatch	·	860 m	MPC · JPL
761653	2010 FT_{25}	—	March 19, 2010	Mount Lemmon	Mount Lemmon Survey	·	860 m	MPC · JPL
761654	2010 FP_{85}	—	March 21, 2010	Catalina	CSS	·	2.6 km	MPC · JPL
761655	2010 FE_{93}	—	March 16, 2010	Mount Lemmon	Mount Lemmon Survey	THM	2.0 km	MPC · JPL
761656	2010 FU_{128}	—	September 24, 2008	Kitt Peak	Spacewatch	3:2	4.1 km	MPC · JPL
761657	2010 FV_{133}	—	March 14, 2016	Mount Lemmon	Mount Lemmon Survey	TEL	1.0 km	MPC · JPL
761658	2010 FW_{137}	—	March 19, 2010	Kitt Peak	Spacewatch	PHO	800 m	MPC · JPL
761659	2010 FL_{138}	—	January 5, 2014	Haleakala	Pan-STARRS 1	·	1.3 km	MPC · JPL
761660	2010 FO_{138}	—	October 8, 2012	Haleakala	Pan-STARRS 1	EOS	1.5 km	MPC · JPL
761661	2010 FA_{139}	—	March 17, 2016	Haleakala	Pan-STARRS 1	·	2.7 km	MPC · JPL
761662	2010 FO_{142}	—	February 23, 2015	Haleakala	Pan-STARRS 1	·	2.4 km	MPC · JPL
761663	2010 FY_{144}	—	March 16, 2010	Mount Lemmon	Mount Lemmon Survey	MAS	550 m	MPC · JPL
761664	2010 FJ_{146}	—	March 19, 2010	Kitt Peak	Spacewatch	·	980 m	MPC · JPL
761665	2010 FK_{146}	—	March 18, 2010	Kitt Peak	Spacewatch	·	780 m	MPC · JPL
761666	2010 GW_{26}	—	April 5, 2010	Kitt Peak	Spacewatch	TIR	2.3 km	MPC · JPL
761667	2010 GT_{31}	—	April 5, 2010	Catalina	CSS	·	1.4 km	MPC · JPL
761668	2010 GT_{62}	—	October 8, 2008	Kitt Peak	Spacewatch	PHO	960 m	MPC · JPL
761669	2010 GQ_{99}	—	March 13, 2010	Kitt Peak	Spacewatch	·	1.0 km	MPC · JPL
761670	2010 GR_{99}	—	March 17, 2010	Kitt Peak	Spacewatch	·	1.0 km	MPC · JPL
761671	2010 GV_{102}	—	November 7, 2007	Mount Lemmon	Mount Lemmon Survey	AEO	960 m	MPC · JPL
761672	2010 GH_{103}	—	April 6, 2010	Mount Lemmon	Mount Lemmon Survey	·	460 m	MPC · JPL
761673	2010 GS_{105}	—	April 7, 2010	Kitt Peak	Spacewatch	·	1.2 km	MPC · JPL
761674	2010 GP_{107}	—	April 8, 2010	Kitt Peak	Spacewatch	·	1.0 km	MPC · JPL
761675	2010 GZ_{115}	—	April 10, 2010	Mount Lemmon	Mount Lemmon Survey	·	1.3 km	MPC · JPL
761676	2010 GK_{124}	—	April 5, 2010	Kitt Peak	Spacewatch	·	1.9 km	MPC · JPL
761677	2010 GQ_{128}	—	April 4, 2010	Kitt Peak	Spacewatch	·	2.3 km	MPC · JPL
761678	2010 GC_{129}	—	April 5, 2010	Kitt Peak	Spacewatch	·	2.6 km	MPC · JPL
761679	2010 GU_{130}	—	April 9, 2010	Kitt Peak	Spacewatch	·	910 m	MPC · JPL
761680	2010 GF_{132}	—	April 10, 2010	Mount Lemmon	Mount Lemmon Survey	·	690 m	MPC · JPL
761681	2010 GG_{134}	—	April 14, 2010	Mount Lemmon	Mount Lemmon Survey	·	2.4 km	MPC · JPL
761682	2010 GW_{137}	—	April 6, 2010	Mount Lemmon	Mount Lemmon Survey	·	490 m	MPC · JPL
761683	2010 GD_{147}	—	April 14, 2010	Mount Lemmon	Mount Lemmon Survey	·	2.7 km	MPC · JPL
761684	2010 GQ_{157}	—	January 11, 2010	Kitt Peak	Spacewatch	·	2.2 km	MPC · JPL
761685	2010 GZ_{177}	—	March 28, 2009	Mount Lemmon	Mount Lemmon Survey	·	3.0 km	MPC · JPL
761686	2010 GM_{183}	—	October 12, 2013	Kitt Peak	Spacewatch	L5	7.0 km	MPC · JPL
761687	2010 GR_{185}	—	December 21, 2014	Haleakala	Pan-STARRS 1	·	1.8 km	MPC · JPL
761688	2010 GT_{200}	—	February 11, 2016	Haleakala	Pan-STARRS 1	TIR	2.2 km	MPC · JPL
761689	2010 GY_{200}	—	October 21, 2012	Haleakala	Pan-STARRS 1	·	1.3 km	MPC · JPL
761690	2010 GE_{201}	—	March 7, 2016	Haleakala	Pan-STARRS 1	·	2.2 km	MPC · JPL
761691	2010 GR_{201}	—	April 9, 2010	Mount Lemmon	Mount Lemmon Survey	·	530 m	MPC · JPL
761692	2010 GS_{201}	—	November 12, 2012	Haleakala	Pan-STARRS 1	·	2.4 km	MPC · JPL
761693	2010 GJ_{203}	—	April 9, 2010	Mount Lemmon	Mount Lemmon Survey	·	1.6 km	MPC · JPL
761694	2010 GD_{204}	—	July 12, 2015	Haleakala	Pan-STARRS 1	·	830 m	MPC · JPL
761695	2010 GU_{204}	—	March 25, 2014	Mount Lemmon	Mount Lemmon Survey	·	1.1 km	MPC · JPL
761696	2010 GM_{205}	—	January 21, 2015	Haleakala	Pan-STARRS 1	·	1.5 km	MPC · JPL
761697	2010 GA_{206}	—	October 18, 2012	Haleakala	Pan-STARRS 1	KOR	1.1 km	MPC · JPL
761698	2010 GG_{207}	—	April 9, 2010	Kitt Peak	Spacewatch	VER	2.5 km	MPC · JPL
761699	2010 GK_{207}	—	April 9, 2010	Kitt Peak	Spacewatch	·	2.9 km	MPC · JPL
761700	2010 GO_{207}	—	June 26, 2015	Haleakala	Pan-STARRS 1	·	900 m	MPC · JPL

== 761701–761800 ==
back to top

Designation			Discovery			Properties		Ref
Permanent	Provisional	Named after	Date	Site	Discoverer(s)	Category	Diam.	Ref
761701	2010 GN_{209}	—	April 14, 2010	Mount Lemmon	Mount Lemmon Survey	TIR	2.6 km	MPC · JPL
761702	2010 GU_{209}	—	April 10, 2010	Mount Lemmon	Mount Lemmon Survey	·	2.1 km	MPC · JPL
761703	2010 GX_{211}	—	April 11, 2010	Kitt Peak	Spacewatch	VER	2.0 km	MPC · JPL
761704	2010 GB_{213}	—	April 14, 2010	Kitt Peak	Spacewatch	·	2.8 km	MPC · JPL
761705	2010 GJ_{213}	—	April 10, 2010	Mount Lemmon	Mount Lemmon Survey	·	2.8 km	MPC · JPL
761706	2010 HB_{77}	—	April 17, 2010	Mount Lemmon	Mount Lemmon Survey	·	2.7 km	MPC · JPL
761707	2010 HC_{122}	—	April 29, 2014	Haleakala	Pan-STARRS 1	·	1.5 km	MPC · JPL
761708	2010 HM_{129}	—	September 27, 2008	Mount Lemmon	Mount Lemmon Survey	T_{j} (2.96) · 3:2	3.6 km	MPC · JPL
761709	2010 HG_{130}	—	May 19, 2010	Mount Lemmon	Mount Lemmon Survey	L5	8.2 km	MPC · JPL
761710	2010 HS_{131}	—	January 8, 2010	Kitt Peak	Spacewatch	·	2.0 km	MPC · JPL
761711	2010 HZ_{138}	—	June 3, 2016	Haleakala	Pan-STARRS 1	·	2.5 km	MPC · JPL
761712	2010 HF_{139}	—	April 20, 2010	Mount Lemmon	Mount Lemmon Survey	·	1.1 km	MPC · JPL
761713	2010 JB_{30}	—	May 3, 2010	Kitt Peak	Spacewatch	·	890 m	MPC · JPL
761714	2010 JF_{33}	—	May 6, 2010	Mount Lemmon	Mount Lemmon Survey	·	2.3 km	MPC · JPL
761715	2010 JL_{39}	—	May 7, 2010	Mount Lemmon	Mount Lemmon Survey	·	1.5 km	MPC · JPL
761716	2010 JF_{45}	—	May 7, 2010	Kitt Peak	Spacewatch	·	1.2 km	MPC · JPL
761717	2010 JX_{46}	—	May 9, 2010	Mount Lemmon	Mount Lemmon Survey	·	2.5 km	MPC · JPL
761718	2010 JX_{76}	—	May 7, 2010	Mount Lemmon	Mount Lemmon Survey	EUN	930 m	MPC · JPL
761719	2010 JR_{78}	—	May 11, 2010	Mount Lemmon	Mount Lemmon Survey	·	1.1 km	MPC · JPL
761720	2010 JC_{85}	—	May 6, 2010	Kitt Peak	Spacewatch	·	1.0 km	MPC · JPL
761721	2010 JE_{115}	—	October 15, 2007	Kitt Peak	Spacewatch	·	2.5 km	MPC · JPL
761722	2010 JG_{117}	—	May 4, 2010	Kitt Peak	Spacewatch	·	2.7 km	MPC · JPL
761723	2010 JK_{156}	—	October 10, 2007	Mount Lemmon	Mount Lemmon Survey	·	1.2 km	MPC · JPL
761724	2010 JD_{158}	—	November 8, 2007	Mount Lemmon	Mount Lemmon Survey	URS	2.2 km	MPC · JPL
761725	2010 JK_{158}	—	May 14, 2010	Mount Lemmon	Mount Lemmon Survey	·	2.1 km	MPC · JPL
761726	2010 JM_{159}	—	November 3, 2007	Kitt Peak	Spacewatch	·	1.4 km	MPC · JPL
761727	2010 JU_{159}	—	May 5, 2010	Mount Lemmon	Mount Lemmon Survey	·	870 m	MPC · JPL
761728	2010 JV_{164}	—	May 9, 2010	Mount Lemmon	Mount Lemmon Survey	·	500 m	MPC · JPL
761729	2010 JB_{184}	—	January 6, 2010	Kitt Peak	Spacewatch	T_{j} (2.87)	2.8 km	MPC · JPL
761730	2010 JO_{185}	—	January 12, 2010	Kitt Peak	Spacewatch	·	1.7 km	MPC · JPL
761731	2010 JR_{191}	—	December 21, 2014	Haleakala	Pan-STARRS 1	·	1.9 km	MPC · JPL
761732	2010 JE_{211}	—	May 7, 2010	Mount Lemmon	Mount Lemmon Survey	·	1.2 km	MPC · JPL
761733	2010 JG_{212}	—	April 24, 2014	Haleakala	Pan-STARRS 1	EUN	870 m	MPC · JPL
761734	2010 JR_{212}	—	May 18, 2018	Mount Lemmon	Mount Lemmon Survey	JUN	1.0 km	MPC · JPL
761735	2010 JD_{213}	—	August 24, 2017	Haleakala	Pan-STARRS 1	EOS	1.4 km	MPC · JPL
761736	2010 JO_{213}	—	February 16, 2015	Haleakala	Pan-STARRS 1	VER	2.0 km	MPC · JPL
761737	2010 JP_{213}	—	April 29, 2014	Haleakala	Pan-STARRS 1	·	1.1 km	MPC · JPL
761738	2010 JN_{214}	—	October 8, 2012	Haleakala	Pan-STARRS 1	JUN	820 m	MPC · JPL
761739	2010 JX_{214}	—	May 11, 2010	Mount Lemmon	Mount Lemmon Survey	·	1.2 km	MPC · JPL
761740	2010 JM_{215}	—	January 21, 2015	Haleakala	Pan-STARRS 1	·	2.4 km	MPC · JPL
761741	2010 KB_{129}	—	May 20, 2010	Mount Lemmon	Mount Lemmon Survey	·	1.3 km	MPC · JPL
761742	2010 KX_{135}	—	July 25, 2015	Haleakala	Pan-STARRS 1	T_{j} (2.95) · 3:2	4.6 km	MPC · JPL
761743	2010 KC_{156}	—	November 28, 2014	Haleakala	Pan-STARRS 1	·	2.9 km	MPC · JPL
761744	2010 KA_{157}	—	February 16, 2015	Haleakala	Pan-STARRS 1	THM	1.9 km	MPC · JPL
761745	2010 KJ_{158}	—	May 21, 2010	Mount Lemmon	Mount Lemmon Survey	·	1.1 km	MPC · JPL
761746	2010 KB_{161}	—	May 20, 2010	Mount Lemmon	Mount Lemmon Survey	·	1.0 km	MPC · JPL
761747	2010 LV_{33}	—	June 6, 2010	Kitt Peak	Spacewatch	·	2.2 km	MPC · JPL
761748	2010 LP_{36}	—	June 10, 2010	Kitt Peak	Spacewatch	·	550 m	MPC · JPL
761749	2010 LX_{65}	—	June 13, 2010	Mount Lemmon	Mount Lemmon Survey	ADE	1.5 km	MPC · JPL
761750	2010 LD_{104}	—	June 4, 2010	Kitt Peak	Spacewatch	T_{j} (2.99)	2.9 km	MPC · JPL
761751	2010 LT_{110}	—	June 13, 2010	Mount Lemmon	Mount Lemmon Survey	·	1.4 km	MPC · JPL
761752	2010 MN_{4}	—	June 21, 2010	Mount Lemmon	Mount Lemmon Survey	·	560 m	MPC · JPL
761753	2010 MB_{112}	—	June 19, 2010	Mount Lemmon	Mount Lemmon Survey	·	760 m	MPC · JPL
761754	2010 MM_{112}	—	June 21, 2010	Mount Lemmon	Mount Lemmon Survey	·	590 m	MPC · JPL
761755	2010 MR_{112}	—	June 21, 2010	Mount Lemmon	Mount Lemmon Survey	·	590 m	MPC · JPL
761756	2010 MC_{118}	—	October 10, 2015	Haleakala	Pan-STARRS 1	·	1.5 km	MPC · JPL
761757	2010 MH_{147}	—	September 29, 2014	Kitt Peak	Spacewatch	·	650 m	MPC · JPL
761758	2010 MR_{147}	—	April 30, 2014	Haleakala	Pan-STARRS 1	·	930 m	MPC · JPL
761759	2010 MC_{149}	—	October 24, 2011	Haleakala	Pan-STARRS 1	·	1.3 km	MPC · JPL
761760	2010 NB_{53}	—	July 10, 2010	WISE	WISE	LIX	2.5 km	MPC · JPL
761761	2010 NT_{76}	—	July 15, 2010	WISE	WISE	·	2.9 km	MPC · JPL
761762	2010 NQ_{118}	—	July 7, 2010	Kitt Peak	Spacewatch	·	540 m	MPC · JPL
761763	2010 NJ_{141}	—	July 13, 2010	WISE	WISE	·	1.2 km	MPC · JPL
761764	2010 NA_{143}	—	November 3, 2012	Mount Lemmon	Mount Lemmon Survey	·	1.7 km	MPC · JPL
761765	2010 NC_{143}	—	July 14, 2010	WISE	WISE	·	2.3 km	MPC · JPL
761766	2010 NV_{146}	—	January 4, 2016	Haleakala	Pan-STARRS 1	·	590 m	MPC · JPL
761767	2010 NO_{147}	—	November 22, 2014	Haleakala	Pan-STARRS 1	·	550 m	MPC · JPL
761768	2010 NS_{147}	—	April 8, 2014	Mount Lemmon	Mount Lemmon Survey	JUN	830 m	MPC · JPL
761769	2010 OV_{20}	—	July 18, 2010	WISE	WISE	·	3.1 km	MPC · JPL
761770	2010 PQ_{22}	—	August 7, 2010	Dauban	C. Rinner, Kugel, F.	EUN	990 m	MPC · JPL
761771	2010 PC_{79}	—	August 9, 2010	XuYi	PMO NEO Survey Program	JUN	1.0 km	MPC · JPL
761772	2010 PT_{81}	—	August 12, 2010	Kitt Peak	Spacewatch	·	2.3 km	MPC · JPL
761773	2010 PG_{88}	—	February 3, 2012	Haleakala	Pan-STARRS 1	·	510 m	MPC · JPL
761774	2010 PY_{88}	—	January 12, 2016	Haleakala	Pan-STARRS 1	JUN	830 m	MPC · JPL
761775	2010 PL_{89}	—	August 13, 2010	Kitt Peak	Spacewatch	·	1.3 km	MPC · JPL
761776	2010 PS_{89}	—	October 26, 2011	Haleakala	Pan-STARRS 1	·	1.3 km	MPC · JPL
761777	2010 QR_{8}	—	August 19, 2010	Kitt Peak	Spacewatch	·	700 m	MPC · JPL
761778	2010 RU_{1}	—	September 16, 2003	Kitt Peak	Spacewatch	·	550 m	MPC · JPL
761779	2010 RD_{10}	—	September 2, 2010	Mount Lemmon	Mount Lemmon Survey	·	1.0 km	MPC · JPL
761780	2010 RQ_{10}	—	September 2, 2010	Mount Lemmon	Mount Lemmon Survey	·	1.2 km	MPC · JPL
761781	2010 RR_{13}	—	September 1, 2010	Mount Lemmon	Mount Lemmon Survey	JUN	840 m	MPC · JPL
761782	2010 RX_{14}	—	September 2, 2010	Mount Lemmon	Mount Lemmon Survey	EUN	880 m	MPC · JPL
761783	2010 RO_{15}	—	September 2, 2010	Mount Lemmon	Mount Lemmon Survey	EOS	1.1 km	MPC · JPL
761784	2010 RV_{35}	—	September 2, 2010	Mount Lemmon	Mount Lemmon Survey	·	1.5 km	MPC · JPL
761785	2010 RB_{40}	—	September 3, 2010	Mount Lemmon	Mount Lemmon Survey	·	1.3 km	MPC · JPL
761786	2010 RN_{40}	—	September 1, 2010	Bergisch Gladbach	W. Bickel	·	2.2 km	MPC · JPL
761787	2010 RH_{45}	—	September 3, 2010	Mount Lemmon	Mount Lemmon Survey	·	1.3 km	MPC · JPL
761788	2010 RO_{53}	—	April 5, 2008	Mount Lemmon	Mount Lemmon Survey	·	2.2 km	MPC · JPL
761789	2010 RZ_{55}	—	September 5, 2010	Mount Lemmon	Mount Lemmon Survey	·	550 m	MPC · JPL
761790	2010 RW_{56}	—	September 5, 2010	Mount Lemmon	Mount Lemmon Survey	LUT	3.3 km	MPC · JPL
761791	2010 RX_{57}	—	September 5, 2010	Mount Lemmon	Mount Lemmon Survey	·	1.4 km	MPC · JPL
761792	2010 RD_{58}	—	September 5, 2010	Mount Lemmon	Mount Lemmon Survey	·	2.4 km	MPC · JPL
761793	2010 RD_{89}	—	September 11, 2010	Mount Lemmon	Mount Lemmon Survey	·	1.1 km	MPC · JPL
761794	2010 RJ_{93}	—	September 11, 2010	Catalina	CSS	·	610 m	MPC · JPL
761795	2010 RV_{104}	—	November 24, 2006	Mount Lemmon	Mount Lemmon Survey	·	1.2 km	MPC · JPL
761796	2010 RO_{109}	—	September 11, 2010	Mount Lemmon	Mount Lemmon Survey	·	2.3 km	MPC · JPL
761797	2010 RZ_{111}	—	August 4, 2003	Kitt Peak	Spacewatch	·	490 m	MPC · JPL
761798	2010 RC_{117}	—	September 11, 2010	Kitt Peak	Spacewatch	·	1.6 km	MPC · JPL
761799	2010 RK_{117}	—	September 11, 2010	Kitt Peak	Spacewatch	·	1.3 km	MPC · JPL
761800	2010 RN_{118}	—	September 11, 2010	Kitt Peak	Spacewatch	·	1.2 km	MPC · JPL

== 761801–761900 ==
back to top

Designation			Discovery			Properties		Ref
Permanent	Provisional	Named after	Date	Site	Discoverer(s)	Category	Diam.	Ref
761801	2010 RG_{127}	—	September 12, 2010	Kitt Peak	Spacewatch	·	540 m	MPC · JPL
761802	2010 RA_{139}	—	November 26, 2005	Mount Lemmon	Mount Lemmon Survey	THM	1.7 km	MPC · JPL
761803	2010 RG_{140}	—	September 12, 2010	Westfield	International Astronomical Search Collaboration	V	390 m	MPC · JPL
761804	2010 RP_{151}	—	September 11, 2010	Kitt Peak	Spacewatch	·	460 m	MPC · JPL
761805	2010 RX_{153}	—	September 15, 2010	Kitt Peak	Spacewatch	·	1.3 km	MPC · JPL
761806	2010 RS_{155}	—	September 15, 2010	Kitt Peak	Spacewatch	·	1.2 km	MPC · JPL
761807	2010 RE_{157}	—	September 15, 2010	Mount Lemmon	Mount Lemmon Survey	V	420 m	MPC · JPL
761808	2010 RF_{157}	—	September 15, 2010	Mount Lemmon	Mount Lemmon Survey	·	530 m	MPC · JPL
761809	2010 RC_{162}	—	August 13, 2010	Kitt Peak	Spacewatch	EUN	870 m	MPC · JPL
761810	2010 RT_{169}	—	September 2, 2010	Mount Lemmon	Mount Lemmon Survey	AEO	710 m	MPC · JPL
761811	2010 RD_{172}	—	September 4, 2010	Kitt Peak	Spacewatch	·	1.4 km	MPC · JPL
761812	2010 RU_{174}	—	September 9, 2010	Kitt Peak	Spacewatch	·	540 m	MPC · JPL
761813	2010 RQ_{175}	—	September 9, 2010	Kitt Peak	Spacewatch	·	3.0 km	MPC · JPL
761814	2010 RC_{178}	—	September 11, 2010	Kitt Peak	Spacewatch	·	1.2 km	MPC · JPL
761815	2010 RW_{178}	—	September 4, 2010	La Sagra	OAM	·	580 m	MPC · JPL
761816	2010 RE_{185}	—	January 30, 2017	Haleakala	Pan-STARRS 1	·	1.0 km	MPC · JPL
761817	2010 RO_{188}	—	October 28, 2005	Mount Lemmon	Mount Lemmon Survey	KOR	1.1 km	MPC · JPL
761818	2010 RJ_{189}	—	September 4, 2010	Kitt Peak	Spacewatch	·	1.5 km	MPC · JPL
761819	2010 RD_{190}	—	December 6, 2007	Mount Lemmon	Mount Lemmon Survey	·	410 m	MPC · JPL
761820	2010 RF_{190}	—	September 19, 1996	Kitt Peak	Spacewatch	·	630 m	MPC · JPL
761821	2010 RU_{193}	—	November 7, 2015	Mount Lemmon	Mount Lemmon Survey	(1547)	1.6 km	MPC · JPL
761822	2010 RG_{194}	—	September 2, 2010	Mount Lemmon	Mount Lemmon Survey	ADE	1.5 km	MPC · JPL
761823	2010 RT_{194}	—	September 15, 2010	Kitt Peak	Spacewatch	(2076)	530 m	MPC · JPL
761824	2010 RD_{198}	—	September 5, 2010	Mount Lemmon	Mount Lemmon Survey	·	1.4 km	MPC · JPL
761825	2010 RN_{199}	—	January 27, 2012	Mount Lemmon	Mount Lemmon Survey	·	1.3 km	MPC · JPL
761826	2010 RQ_{199}	—	February 14, 2013	Haleakala	Pan-STARRS 1	·	1.4 km	MPC · JPL
761827	2010 RL_{200}	—	September 11, 2010	Kitt Peak	Spacewatch	·	1.6 km	MPC · JPL
761828	2010 RP_{200}	—	July 25, 2015	Haleakala	Pan-STARRS 1	·	1.6 km	MPC · JPL
761829	2010 RV_{200}	—	September 5, 2010	Mount Lemmon	Mount Lemmon Survey	(18466)	2.0 km	MPC · JPL
761830	2010 RL_{201}	—	February 27, 2012	Haleakala	Pan-STARRS 1	·	430 m	MPC · JPL
761831	2010 RU_{201}	—	September 23, 2015	Haleakala	Pan-STARRS 1	·	1.4 km	MPC · JPL
761832	2010 RH_{202}	—	October 27, 2017	Mount Lemmon	Mount Lemmon Survey	·	3.3 km	MPC · JPL
761833	2010 RJ_{203}	—	June 19, 2010	Mount Lemmon	Mount Lemmon Survey	·	1.4 km	MPC · JPL
761834	2010 RT_{203}	—	September 9, 2015	Haleakala	Pan-STARRS 1	HOF	1.9 km	MPC · JPL
761835	2010 RP_{204}	—	September 14, 2010	Kitt Peak	Spacewatch	AGN	790 m	MPC · JPL
761836	2010 RR_{204}	—	October 9, 2015	Haleakala	Pan-STARRS 1	·	1.1 km	MPC · JPL
761837	2010 RT_{204}	—	July 1, 2014	Haleakala	Pan-STARRS 1	AGN	760 m	MPC · JPL
761838	2010 RZ_{204}	—	November 21, 2015	Mount Lemmon	Mount Lemmon Survey	·	980 m	MPC · JPL
761839	2010 RA_{205}	—	February 14, 2013	Haleakala	Pan-STARRS 1	AGN	930 m	MPC · JPL
761840	2010 RQ_{205}	—	September 10, 2010	Mount Lemmon	Mount Lemmon Survey	·	1.5 km	MPC · JPL
761841	2010 RF_{207}	—	September 4, 2010	Mount Lemmon	Mount Lemmon Survey	·	1.2 km	MPC · JPL
761842	2010 RW_{210}	—	September 15, 2010	Kitt Peak	Spacewatch	·	550 m	MPC · JPL
761843	2010 RK_{211}	—	September 12, 2010	Kitt Peak	Spacewatch	·	2.3 km	MPC · JPL
761844	2010 RU_{215}	—	September 2, 2010	Mount Lemmon	Mount Lemmon Survey	·	2.3 km	MPC · JPL
761845	2010 RF_{219}	—	September 14, 2010	Mount Lemmon	Mount Lemmon Survey	H	370 m	MPC · JPL
761846	2010 RK_{223}	—	September 2, 2010	Mount Lemmon	Mount Lemmon Survey	·	430 m	MPC · JPL
761847	2010 RO_{225}	—	September 2, 2010	Mount Lemmon	Mount Lemmon Survey	·	1.9 km	MPC · JPL
761848	2010 RQ_{226}	—	September 10, 2010	Kitt Peak	Spacewatch	·	3.3 km	MPC · JPL
761849	2010 SP	—	September 16, 2010	Mount Lemmon	Mount Lemmon Survey	·	2.1 km	MPC · JPL
761850	2010 SY_{7}	—	September 4, 2010	Mount Lemmon	Mount Lemmon Survey	·	2.2 km	MPC · JPL
761851	2010 SJ_{12}	—	September 17, 2010	Mount Lemmon	Mount Lemmon Survey	DOR	1.9 km	MPC · JPL
761852	2010 SB_{16}	—	September 29, 2010	Mount Lemmon	Mount Lemmon Survey	·	1.2 km	MPC · JPL
761853	2010 SB_{20}	—	September 10, 2010	Kitt Peak	Spacewatch	·	1.4 km	MPC · JPL
761854	2010 SE_{26}	—	September 19, 2010	Kitt Peak	Spacewatch	·	490 m	MPC · JPL
761855	2010 SC_{30}	—	July 7, 2005	Mauna Kea	Veillet, C.	·	1.1 km	MPC · JPL
761856	2010 SB_{32}	—	September 30, 2010	Mount Lemmon	Mount Lemmon Survey	·	1.5 km	MPC · JPL
761857	2010 SO_{33}	—	September 30, 2010	Mount Lemmon	Mount Lemmon Survey	·	1.6 km	MPC · JPL
761858	2010 SS_{33}	—	September 30, 2010	Mount Lemmon	Mount Lemmon Survey	·	1.4 km	MPC · JPL
761859	2010 SL_{44}	—	September 16, 2010	Mount Lemmon	Mount Lemmon Survey	·	1.1 km	MPC · JPL
761860	2010 ST_{44}	—	September 30, 2010	Mount Lemmon	Mount Lemmon Survey	EUN	1.0 km	MPC · JPL
761861	2010 SD_{46}	—	September 12, 2010	Kitt Peak	Spacewatch	·	510 m	MPC · JPL
761862	2010 SV_{46}	—	September 18, 2010	Mount Lemmon	Mount Lemmon Survey	·	500 m	MPC · JPL
761863	2010 SG_{48}	—	July 13, 2016	Haleakala	Pan-STARRS 1	·	3.1 km	MPC · JPL
761864	2010 SB_{49}	—	September 17, 2010	Mount Lemmon	Mount Lemmon Survey	·	460 m	MPC · JPL
761865	2010 SH_{50}	—	September 17, 2010	Mount Lemmon	Mount Lemmon Survey	·	1.3 km	MPC · JPL
761866	2010 ST_{50}	—	December 3, 2015	Haleakala	Pan-STARRS 1	HNS	790 m	MPC · JPL
761867	2010 SC_{51}	—	September 30, 2010	Mount Lemmon	Mount Lemmon Survey	HNS	820 m	MPC · JPL
761868	2010 SO_{51}	—	September 16, 2010	Mount Lemmon	Mount Lemmon Survey	·	1.5 km	MPC · JPL
761869	2010 SK_{52}	—	October 10, 2015	Haleakala	Pan-STARRS 1	·	1.5 km	MPC · JPL
761870	2010 SF_{53}	—	December 5, 2015	Haleakala	Pan-STARRS 1	·	1.5 km	MPC · JPL
761871	2010 SA_{54}	—	April 24, 2014	Mount Lemmon	Mount Lemmon Survey	·	2.5 km	MPC · JPL
761872	2010 SL_{54}	—	September 18, 2010	Kitt Peak	Spacewatch	HNS	830 m	MPC · JPL
761873	2010 SO_{54}	—	September 29, 2010	Mount Lemmon	Mount Lemmon Survey	AGN	860 m	MPC · JPL
761874	2010 SQ_{54}	—	September 18, 2010	Mount Lemmon	Mount Lemmon Survey	·	1.6 km	MPC · JPL
761875	2010 SY_{54}	—	September 29, 2010	Mount Lemmon	Mount Lemmon Survey	MAS	570 m	MPC · JPL
761876	2010 SM_{55}	—	September 29, 2010	Mount Lemmon	Mount Lemmon Survey	·	1.0 km	MPC · JPL
761877	2010 SO_{55}	—	September 17, 2010	Mount Lemmon	Mount Lemmon Survey	·	1.3 km	MPC · JPL
761878	2010 SP_{56}	—	September 17, 2010	Mount Lemmon	Mount Lemmon Survey	KOR	1.0 km	MPC · JPL
761879	2010 SF_{57}	—	October 24, 2003	Kitt Peak	Spacewatch	·	500 m	MPC · JPL
761880	2010 SP_{57}	—	September 29, 2010	Mount Lemmon	Mount Lemmon Survey	·	1.1 km	MPC · JPL
761881	2010 SJ_{59}	—	September 17, 2010	Mount Lemmon	Mount Lemmon Survey	·	570 m	MPC · JPL
761882	2010 SG_{65}	—	September 28, 2010	Kitt Peak	Spacewatch	·	2.3 km	MPC · JPL
761883	2010 SK_{66}	—	September 17, 2010	Mount Lemmon	Mount Lemmon Survey	·	1.2 km	MPC · JPL
761884	2010 SG_{69}	—	September 30, 2010	Mount Lemmon	Mount Lemmon Survey	·	1.4 km	MPC · JPL
761885	2010 TO_{1}	—	October 1, 2010	Kitt Peak	Spacewatch	·	1.8 km	MPC · JPL
761886	2010 TD_{2}	—	September 16, 2010	Kitt Peak	Spacewatch	·	520 m	MPC · JPL
761887	2010 TV_{2}	—	October 2, 2010	Kitt Peak	Spacewatch	·	510 m	MPC · JPL
761888	2010 TA_{3}	—	September 10, 2010	Kitt Peak	Spacewatch	·	1.3 km	MPC · JPL
761889	2010 TB_{3}	—	September 10, 2010	Kitt Peak	Spacewatch	·	1.2 km	MPC · JPL
761890	2010 TF_{3}	—	October 2, 2010	Kitt Peak	Spacewatch	·	1.4 km	MPC · JPL
761891	2010 TQ_{4}	—	September 15, 2010	Kitt Peak	Spacewatch	·	450 m	MPC · JPL
761892	2010 TM_{17}	—	September 15, 2010	Kitt Peak	Spacewatch	·	1.6 km	MPC · JPL
761893	2010 TF_{20}	—	September 16, 2010	Kitt Peak	Spacewatch	·	1.4 km	MPC · JPL
761894	2010 TS_{25}	—	September 15, 2010	Kitt Peak	Spacewatch	·	1.4 km	MPC · JPL
761895	2010 TE_{27}	—	September 2, 2010	Mount Lemmon	Mount Lemmon Survey	·	1.5 km	MPC · JPL
761896	2010 TJ_{31}	—	October 2, 2010	Kitt Peak	Spacewatch	·	1.1 km	MPC · JPL
761897	2010 TN_{33}	—	September 25, 2006	Kitt Peak	Spacewatch	·	710 m	MPC · JPL
761898	2010 TE_{36}	—	September 19, 2010	Kitt Peak	Spacewatch	·	1.4 km	MPC · JPL
761899	2010 TB_{44}	—	October 2, 2010	Kitt Peak	Spacewatch	·	450 m	MPC · JPL
761900	2010 TG_{45}	—	October 3, 2010	Kitt Peak	Spacewatch	·	1.5 km	MPC · JPL

== 761901–762000 ==
back to top

Designation			Discovery			Properties		Ref
Permanent	Provisional	Named after	Date	Site	Discoverer(s)	Category	Diam.	Ref
761901	2010 TK_{45}	—	October 3, 2010	Kitt Peak	Spacewatch	·	570 m	MPC · JPL
761902	2010 TC_{51}	—	October 5, 2010	Westfield	International Astronomical Search Collaboration	·	570 m	MPC · JPL
761903	2010 TV_{67}	—	October 8, 2010	Kitt Peak	Spacewatch	·	1.7 km	MPC · JPL
761904	2010 TF_{80}	—	October 8, 2010	Kitt Peak	Spacewatch	(12739)	1.2 km	MPC · JPL
761905	2010 TP_{80}	—	August 10, 2005	Cerro Tololo	Deep Ecliptic Survey	AGN	840 m	MPC · JPL
761906	2010 TZ_{85}	—	October 9, 2010	Kitt Peak	Spacewatch	·	1.1 km	MPC · JPL
761907	2010 TC_{88}	—	November 26, 2005	Mount Lemmon	Mount Lemmon Survey	·	1.8 km	MPC · JPL
761908	2010 TM_{90}	—	September 16, 2010	Kitt Peak	Spacewatch	MRX	780 m	MPC · JPL
761909	2010 TW_{93}	—	October 9, 2010	Mount Lemmon	Mount Lemmon Survey	·	1.1 km	MPC · JPL
761910	2010 TC_{94}	—	October 9, 2010	Mount Lemmon	Mount Lemmon Survey	·	1.1 km	MPC · JPL
761911	2010 TO_{95}	—	September 29, 2010	Mount Lemmon	Mount Lemmon Survey	NYS	800 m	MPC · JPL
761912	2010 TP_{96}	—	October 1, 2010	Mount Lemmon	Mount Lemmon Survey	·	1.6 km	MPC · JPL
761913	2010 TO_{97}	—	October 1, 2010	Mount Lemmon	Mount Lemmon Survey	·	2.3 km	MPC · JPL
761914	2010 TE_{99}	—	November 3, 2005	Mount Lemmon	Mount Lemmon Survey	EOS	1.2 km	MPC · JPL
761915	2010 TQ_{101}	—	September 30, 2010	Mount Lemmon	Mount Lemmon Survey	HOF	1.9 km	MPC · JPL
761916	2010 TK_{109}	—	November 22, 2006	Mount Lemmon	Mount Lemmon Survey	·	1.2 km	MPC · JPL
761917	2010 TD_{115}	—	September 10, 2010	Kitt Peak	Spacewatch	·	1.3 km	MPC · JPL
761918	2010 TY_{116}	—	October 9, 2010	Mount Lemmon	Mount Lemmon Survey	·	1.4 km	MPC · JPL
761919	2010 TV_{125}	—	October 10, 2010	Mount Lemmon	Mount Lemmon Survey	NEM	1.6 km	MPC · JPL
761920	2010 TD_{128}	—	October 11, 2010	Kitt Peak	Spacewatch	·	1.1 km	MPC · JPL
761921	2010 TL_{132}	—	October 11, 2010	Mount Lemmon	Mount Lemmon Survey	·	550 m	MPC · JPL
761922	2010 TQ_{139}	—	September 17, 2010	Mount Lemmon	Mount Lemmon Survey	·	1.1 km	MPC · JPL
761923	2010 TQ_{141}	—	October 11, 2010	Mount Lemmon	Mount Lemmon Survey	·	1.2 km	MPC · JPL
761924	2010 TS_{141}	—	October 11, 2010	Mount Lemmon	Mount Lemmon Survey	·	1.3 km	MPC · JPL
761925	2010 TV_{142}	—	October 11, 2010	Mount Lemmon	Mount Lemmon Survey	·	480 m	MPC · JPL
761926	2010 TV_{153}	—	September 14, 2010	Kitt Peak	Spacewatch	HNS	790 m	MPC · JPL
761927	2010 TN_{155}	—	September 4, 2010	Kitt Peak	Spacewatch	DOR	1.6 km	MPC · JPL
761928	2010 TO_{158}	—	October 10, 2010	Kitt Peak	Spacewatch	·	1.2 km	MPC · JPL
761929	2010 TD_{163}	—	October 12, 2010	Catalina	CSS	·	1.3 km	MPC · JPL
761930	2010 TH_{163}	—	October 2, 2010	Kitt Peak	Spacewatch	·	1.3 km	MPC · JPL
761931	2010 TZ_{168}	—	October 5, 2010	Westfield	International Astronomical Search Collaboration	·	1.4 km	MPC · JPL
761932	2010 TK_{179}	—	October 1, 2010	Mount Lemmon	Mount Lemmon Survey	GEF	980 m	MPC · JPL
761933	2010 TH_{180}	—	September 14, 2010	Kitt Peak	Spacewatch	·	1.4 km	MPC · JPL
761934	2010 TM_{180}	—	September 10, 2010	Kitt Peak	Spacewatch	MRX	910 m	MPC · JPL
761935	2010 TU_{190}	—	October 9, 2010	Kitt Peak	Spacewatch	·	1.3 km	MPC · JPL
761936	2010 TC_{195}	—	October 13, 2010	Mount Lemmon	Mount Lemmon Survey	·	1.4 km	MPC · JPL
761937	2010 TE_{197}	—	October 13, 2010	Mount Lemmon	Mount Lemmon Survey	H	380 m	MPC · JPL
761938	2010 TY_{197}	—	January 23, 2015	Haleakala	Pan-STARRS 1	·	680 m	MPC · JPL
761939	2010 TF_{198}	—	October 12, 2010	Mount Lemmon	Mount Lemmon Survey	L4	8.6 km	MPC · JPL
761940	2010 TQ_{198}	—	October 2, 2010	Kitt Peak	Spacewatch	·	1.6 km	MPC · JPL
761941	2010 TN_{201}	—	October 2, 2010	Mount Lemmon	Mount Lemmon Survey	WIT	650 m	MPC · JPL
761942	2010 TZ_{203}	—	February 3, 2012	Mount Lemmon	Mount Lemmon Survey	·	1.3 km	MPC · JPL
761943	2010 TU_{204}	—	November 26, 2014	Haleakala	Pan-STARRS 1	·	630 m	MPC · JPL
761944	2010 TL_{205}	—	January 27, 2017	Haleakala	Pan-STARRS 1	·	1.7 km	MPC · JPL
761945	2010 TY_{205}	—	October 11, 2010	Kitt Peak	Spacewatch	·	1.2 km	MPC · JPL
761946	2010 TO_{207}	—	October 13, 2010	Mount Lemmon	Mount Lemmon Survey	·	2.9 km	MPC · JPL
761947	2010 TW_{207}	—	October 12, 2010	Mount Lemmon	Mount Lemmon Survey	·	570 m	MPC · JPL
761948	2010 TV_{208}	—	October 12, 2010	Mount Lemmon	Mount Lemmon Survey	·	1.3 km	MPC · JPL
761949	2010 TX_{209}	—	October 12, 2010	Mount Lemmon	Mount Lemmon Survey	KOR	1.2 km	MPC · JPL
761950	2010 TE_{210}	—	January 18, 2012	Kitt Peak	Spacewatch	·	1.3 km	MPC · JPL
761951	2010 TL_{211}	—	October 14, 2010	Mount Lemmon	Mount Lemmon Survey	·	1.3 km	MPC · JPL
761952	2010 TP_{211}	—	October 11, 2010	Kitt Peak	Spacewatch	·	1.2 km	MPC · JPL
761953	2010 TQ_{211}	—	September 30, 2010	Mount Lemmon	Mount Lemmon Survey	·	510 m	MPC · JPL
761954	2010 TO_{212}	—	October 2, 2010	Kitt Peak	Spacewatch	·	2.4 km	MPC · JPL
761955	2010 TA_{213}	—	October 13, 2010	Mount Lemmon	Mount Lemmon Survey	·	1.6 km	MPC · JPL
761956	2010 TC_{213}	—	October 12, 2010	Mount Lemmon	Mount Lemmon Survey	·	500 m	MPC · JPL
761957	2010 TO_{213}	—	October 12, 2010	Mount Lemmon	Mount Lemmon Survey	·	1.3 km	MPC · JPL
761958	2010 TU_{215}	—	October 11, 2010	Mount Lemmon	Mount Lemmon Survey	·	2.2 km	MPC · JPL
761959	2010 TC_{217}	—	October 8, 2010	Kitt Peak	Spacewatch	·	700 m	MPC · JPL
761960	2010 TQ_{219}	—	October 12, 2010	Kitt Peak	Spacewatch	·	920 m	MPC · JPL
761961	2010 TF_{220}	—	October 13, 2010	Mount Lemmon	Mount Lemmon Survey	·	540 m	MPC · JPL
761962	2010 TS_{221}	—	October 9, 2010	Mount Lemmon	Mount Lemmon Survey	·	1.4 km	MPC · JPL
761963	2010 TR_{225}	—	October 13, 2010	Kitt Peak	Spacewatch	AGN	880 m	MPC · JPL
761964	2010 TK_{229}	—	October 13, 2010	Mount Lemmon	Mount Lemmon Survey	L4	5.6 km	MPC · JPL
761965	2010 TO_{230}	—	October 2, 2010	Mount Lemmon	Mount Lemmon Survey	·	870 m	MPC · JPL
761966	2010 TH_{235}	—	November 22, 2014	Mount Lemmon	Mount Lemmon Survey	·	700 m	MPC · JPL
761967	2010 TU_{238}	—	October 12, 2010	Mount Lemmon	Mount Lemmon Survey	AGN	910 m	MPC · JPL
761968	2010 UY_{1}	—	September 18, 2010	Mount Lemmon	Mount Lemmon Survey	·	1.2 km	MPC · JPL
761969	2010 UO_{18}	—	October 28, 2010	Mount Lemmon	Mount Lemmon Survey	·	1.3 km	MPC · JPL
761970	2010 UB_{22}	—	October 28, 2010	Mount Lemmon	Mount Lemmon Survey	AGN	940 m	MPC · JPL
761971	2010 UC_{31}	—	October 29, 2010	Kitt Peak	Spacewatch	L4	7.8 km	MPC · JPL
761972	2010 UD_{32}	—	October 29, 2010	Mount Lemmon	Mount Lemmon Survey	HNS	1 km	MPC · JPL
761973	2010 US_{36}	—	October 29, 2010	Mount Lemmon	Mount Lemmon Survey	·	840 m	MPC · JPL
761974	2010 UP_{40}	—	October 29, 2010	Piszkés-tető	K. Sárneczky, S. Kürti	HOF	1.9 km	MPC · JPL
761975	2010 UJ_{42}	—	October 9, 2010	Mount Lemmon	Mount Lemmon Survey	·	1.1 km	MPC · JPL
761976	2010 UN_{42}	—	October 30, 2010	Mount Lemmon	Mount Lemmon Survey	·	1.7 km	MPC · JPL
761977	2010 UD_{45}	—	October 13, 2010	Mount Lemmon	Mount Lemmon Survey	·	2.1 km	MPC · JPL
761978	2010 UW_{46}	—	October 30, 2010	Piszkés-tető	K. Sárneczky, Z. Kuli	L4	6.0 km	MPC · JPL
761979	2010 UU_{47}	—	October 11, 2010	Mount Lemmon	Mount Lemmon Survey	·	1.3 km	MPC · JPL
761980	2010 UU_{52}	—	October 14, 2001	Socorro	LINEAR	·	1.3 km	MPC · JPL
761981	2010 UE_{55}	—	October 29, 2010	Kitt Peak	Spacewatch	L4	8.3 km	MPC · JPL
761982	2010 US_{60}	—	October 29, 2010	Piszkés-tető	K. Sárneczky, Z. Kuli	·	1.4 km	MPC · JPL
761983	2010 UW_{64}	—	October 12, 2010	Mount Lemmon	Mount Lemmon Survey	·	1.3 km	MPC · JPL
761984	2010 UK_{66}	—	October 31, 2010	Mount Lemmon	Mount Lemmon Survey	L4	8.7 km	MPC · JPL
761985	2010 UN_{66}	—	April 19, 2009	Mount Lemmon	Mount Lemmon Survey	·	630 m	MPC · JPL
761986	2010 UP_{70}	—	October 28, 2010	Mount Lemmon	Mount Lemmon Survey	·	570 m	MPC · JPL
761987	2010 UN_{85}	—	March 19, 2009	Kitt Peak	Spacewatch	JUN	900 m	MPC · JPL
761988	2010 UZ_{88}	—	September 18, 2010	Mount Lemmon	Mount Lemmon Survey	·	1.3 km	MPC · JPL
761989	2010 UY_{90}	—	October 31, 2010	Mount Lemmon	Mount Lemmon Survey	·	1.3 km	MPC · JPL
761990	2010 UN_{97}	—	October 28, 2010	Mount Lemmon	Mount Lemmon Survey	·	1.4 km	MPC · JPL
761991	2010 UD_{101}	—	October 12, 2010	Mount Lemmon	Mount Lemmon Survey	·	1.5 km	MPC · JPL
761992	2010 UX_{107}	—	November 2, 2010	Mount Lemmon	Mount Lemmon Survey	BAP	580 m	MPC · JPL
761993	2010 UP_{108}	—	April 12, 2005	Kitt Peak	Deep Ecliptic Survey	CLA	1.2 km	MPC · JPL
761994	2010 UB_{109}	—	September 18, 2010	Mount Lemmon	Mount Lemmon Survey	·	1.3 km	MPC · JPL
761995	2010 UN_{109}	—	October 28, 2010	Mount Lemmon	Mount Lemmon Survey	·	1.2 km	MPC · JPL
761996	2010 UG_{112}	—	October 17, 2010	Mount Lemmon	Mount Lemmon Survey	·	650 m	MPC · JPL
761997	2010 UE_{113}	—	October 17, 2010	Mount Lemmon	Mount Lemmon Survey	AGN	920 m	MPC · JPL
761998	2010 UR_{113}	—	October 17, 2010	Mount Lemmon	Mount Lemmon Survey	·	1.3 km	MPC · JPL
761999	2010 UH_{114}	—	October 30, 2010	Catalina	CSS	·	1.1 km	MPC · JPL
762000	2010 UK_{115}	—	October 17, 2010	Mount Lemmon	Mount Lemmon Survey	·	1.5 km	MPC · JPL

back to top

== Meaning of names ==
As minor planet discoveries are confirmed, they are given a permanent number by the IAU's Minor Planet Center (MPC), and the discoverers can then submit names for them, following the IAU's naming conventions. The list below concerns those minor planets in the specified number-range that have received names, and explains the meanings of those names.

Official naming citations of newly named small Solar System bodies are approved and published in a bulletin by IAU's Working Group for Small Bodies Nomenclature (WGSBN). Before May 2021, citations were published in MPC's Minor Planet Circulars for many decades. Recent citations can also be found on the JPL Small-Body Database (SBDB). Until his death in 2016, German astronomer Lutz D. Schmadel compiled these citations into the Dictionary of Minor Planet Names (DMP) and regularly updated the collection.

Based on Paul Herget's The Names of the Minor Planets, Schmadel also researched the unclear origin of numerous asteroids, most of which had been named prior to World War II. This article incorporates text from this source, which is in the public domain: SBDB New namings may only be added to this list below after official publication as the preannouncement of names is condemned. The WGSBN publishes a comprehensive guideline for the naming rules of non-cometary small Solar System bodies.

Named minor planet	Provisional	This minor planet was named for...	Ref · Catalog
761081 Sandraeglīte	2009 HD_{115}	Sandra Eglīte, second wife of the second discoverer since 2018.	IAU · 761081
761083 Micloș	2009 HS_{116}	Cosmin-Sorin Micloș, Romanian promoter of astronomy and space.	IAU · 761083
